= Han Zhong (Daoist) =

Chinese legendary figure

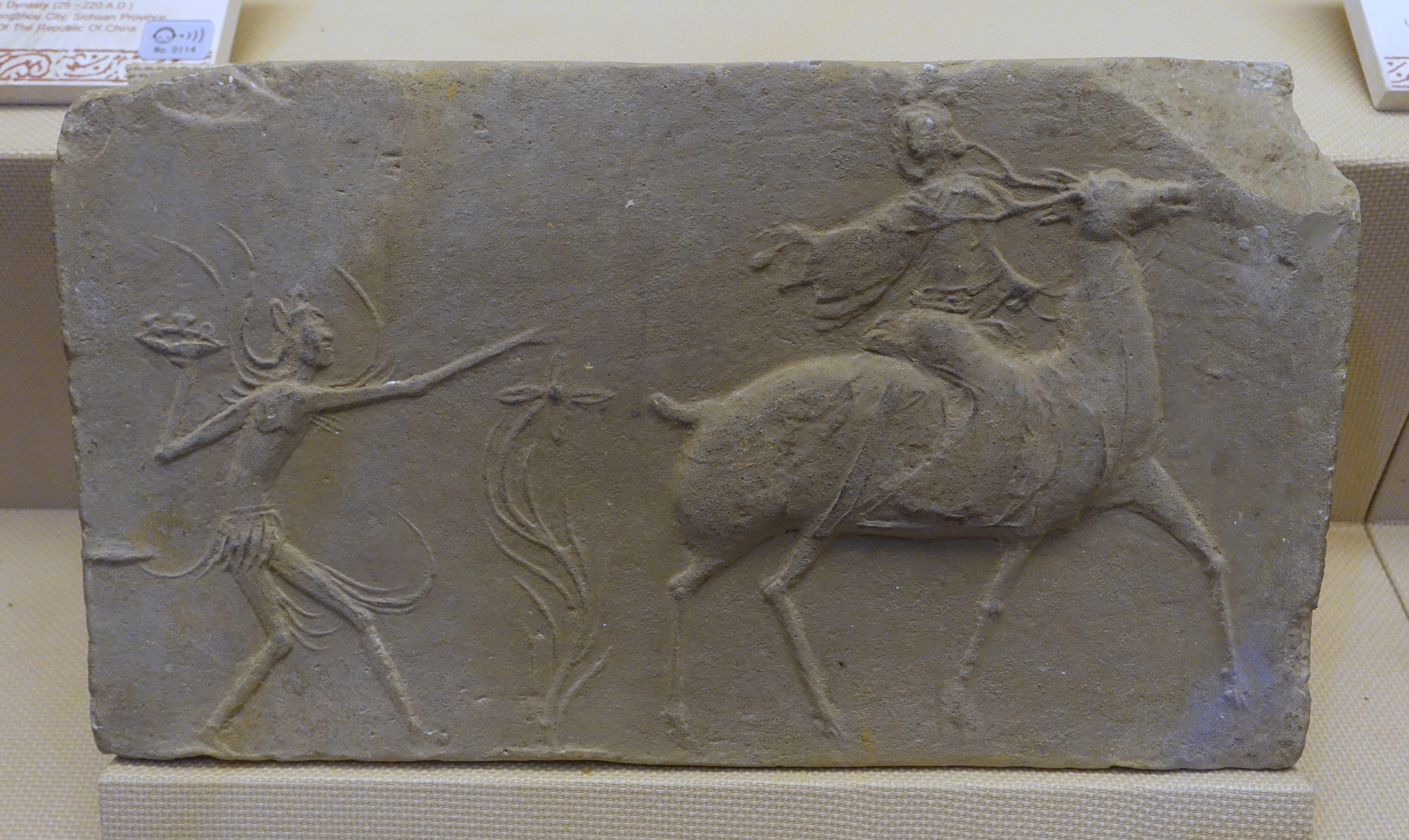
- Transcendent with a flower and Han Zhong riding a deer, Eastern Han dynasty (25–220 CE) tomb tile

Chinese name
- Traditional Chinese: 韓終
- Simplified Chinese: 韩终
Transcriptions
Standard Mandarin
- Hanyu Pinyin: Hán Zhōng
- Wade–Giles: Han^{2} Chung^{1}
Hakka
- Pha̍k-fa-sṳ: Hòn Chûng
Yue: Cantonese
- Jyutping: Hon^{6} Zung^{1}
Southern Min
- Hokkien POJ: Hân Chiong
Middle Chinese
- Middle Chinese: Han Tsyuwng
Old Chinese
- Baxter–Sagart (2014): *[G]ˁar Tuŋ

Korean name
- Hangul: 한종
- Hanja: 韓終
Transcriptions
- Revised Romanization: Han Jong

Japanese name
- Kanji: 韓終
- Kana: かんしゅう
Transcriptions
- Romanization: Kan Shū

Han Zhong (traditional Chinese: 韓終; simplified Chinese: 韩终) was a Qin dynasty (221 BCE–206 BCE) herbalist fangshi ("Method Master") and Daoist xian ("Transcendent; 'Immortal'"). In Chinese history, Qin Shi Huang, the first emperor of China, commissioned Han in 215 BCE to lead a maritime expedition in search of the elixir of life, yet he never returned, which subsequently led to the infamous burning of books and burying of scholars. In Daoist tradition, after Han Zhong consumed the psychoactive drug changpu (菖蒲; "Acorus calamus, sweet flag") for thirteen years, he grew thick body hair that protected him from cold, acquired a photographic memory, and achieved transcendence. He is iconographically represented as riding a white deer and having pendulous ears.

== Terminology ==
The present Chinese name Han Zhong combines the common surname Hán (韓) and given name Zhōng (終) or Zhòng (眾).

Hán (韓 or 韩) has English translation equivalents of: "1. name of one of the 7 major states in Warring States period, comprising the area of present-day southeast Shanxi and central Henan, originally part of the Jin state. 2. a surname." In modern Standard Chinese usage, the word commonly translates "Korea", such as Hánguó (韓國; "Korea") or Běihán (北韓; "North Korea").

Zhōng (終 or 终) has English translations of: "1. end, finish, conclude … come to the end of life; death, demise. 2. all the way to the end, through to the finish; all of, the whole, complete(ly) … 3. in the end, finally, after all, in conclusion. …". Zhòng (眾 or 众) can be translated as: "1. multitude, throng; manifold; numerous, legion; throng(ing); sundry, diverse … the crowd, common run, mass of; average, normal … 2. in everyone's presence, public(ly)".

Although scholars generally believe Han Zhong (韓眾) and Han Zhong (韓終) were variant writings of one person's name, some suggest they were two individuals; the Warring States period (475–221 BCE) Transcendent Han Zhong (韓眾) and the Western Han dynasty (202 BCE-9 CE) fangshi Han Zhong (韓終).

Two honorific names below for Han Zhong are Huolin xianren (霍林仙人; "Transcendent of Huolin") and Bailuxian (白鹿仙; "White Deer Transcendent").

Chāng (菖) is usually limited to the Acorus name: 1. ~蒲 chāngpú, sweet-flag (Acorus calamus), sweetly scented wetland grass, used apotropaically; sometimes ref[erring] to cattail (Typha latifolia) or bulrush (Typha minima)."

Pú (蒲) occurs within several Chinese plant names: "1. sweet-flag (Acorus calamus), also 菖~ chāngpú, a wetland grass, used apotropaically; the latter also cattail (Typha latifolia) or bulrush (Typha minima). 2. ~柳 [with "willow"] púliǔ, purple willow, purple osier (Salix sinopurpurea), deciduous shrub that produces small purple catkins in early spring. 3. ~葵 [with "sunflower"] púkuí, Chinese fan palm, fountain palm (Livistona chinensis). 4. ~桃 [with "peach"] pútáo, rose-apple (Syzygium jambos). ...".

A modern dictionary of Chinese botanical nomenclature lists five Acorus terms: changpu (菖蒲; "Acorus calamus"), riben baichang (日本白菖; "with "Japanese", A. calamus var. angustatus"), shi changpu (石菖蒲; "with "stone/rock", Acorus gramineus"), xiye changpu (細葉菖蒲; "with "thin leaf", A. gramineus var. pusillus"), and jinxian shi changpu (金線石菖蒲; "with "gold thread", A. gramineus var. variegatus").

== Han Zhong in Chinese literature ==
The Chinese classics present Han Zhong as both a historical personage and a legendary persona. The textual examples below are roughly arranged chronologically.

=== Chuci ===
The 3rd–2nd centuries BCE Chuci ("Songs of Chu") mentions Han Zhong (韓眾) in two poems about shamanistic spirit journeys. The Yuan You (遠遊; "Far Roaming") compares him with Fu Yue, a legendary minister under the Shang dynasty king Wu Ding (r. c. 1250–c. 1200 BCE),

I marveled how Fu Yue lived on in a star;
I admired Han Zhong for attaining Oneness.
Their bodies grew dim and faded in the distance;
They left the crowded world behind and withdrew themselves.

The Zibei (自悲; "Oppressed by Grief") poem says,

I heard South Land music and wanted to go there,
And coming to Kuaiji I rested there awhile.
There I met Han Zhong, who gave me lodging.
I asked him wherein lay the secret of heaven's Tao.
Borrowing a floating cloud to take me on my journey,
With the pale woman-rainbow as a banner to fly over it,
I harnessed the Green Dragon to it for my swift conveyance.
And off in a flash we flew, at a speed that made the eyes dim.

In addition, the Chuci's enigmatic Tianwen (Heavenly Questions) section refers to marijuana and perhaps calamus. "Where is the nine-branched weed [靡蓱九衢]? Where is the flower of the Great Hemp [枲華]?"; alternatively, "The nine-jointed calamus, And xi blossoms, where do they grow?".

Two Chuci poems mention white deer: "Green cyprus grass grows in between, And the rush-grass rustles and sways. White deer, roebuck and horned deer Now leap and now stand poised."; "Floating on cloud and mist, we enter the dim height of heaven; Riding on white deer we sport and take our pleasure."

=== Records of the Grand Historian ===
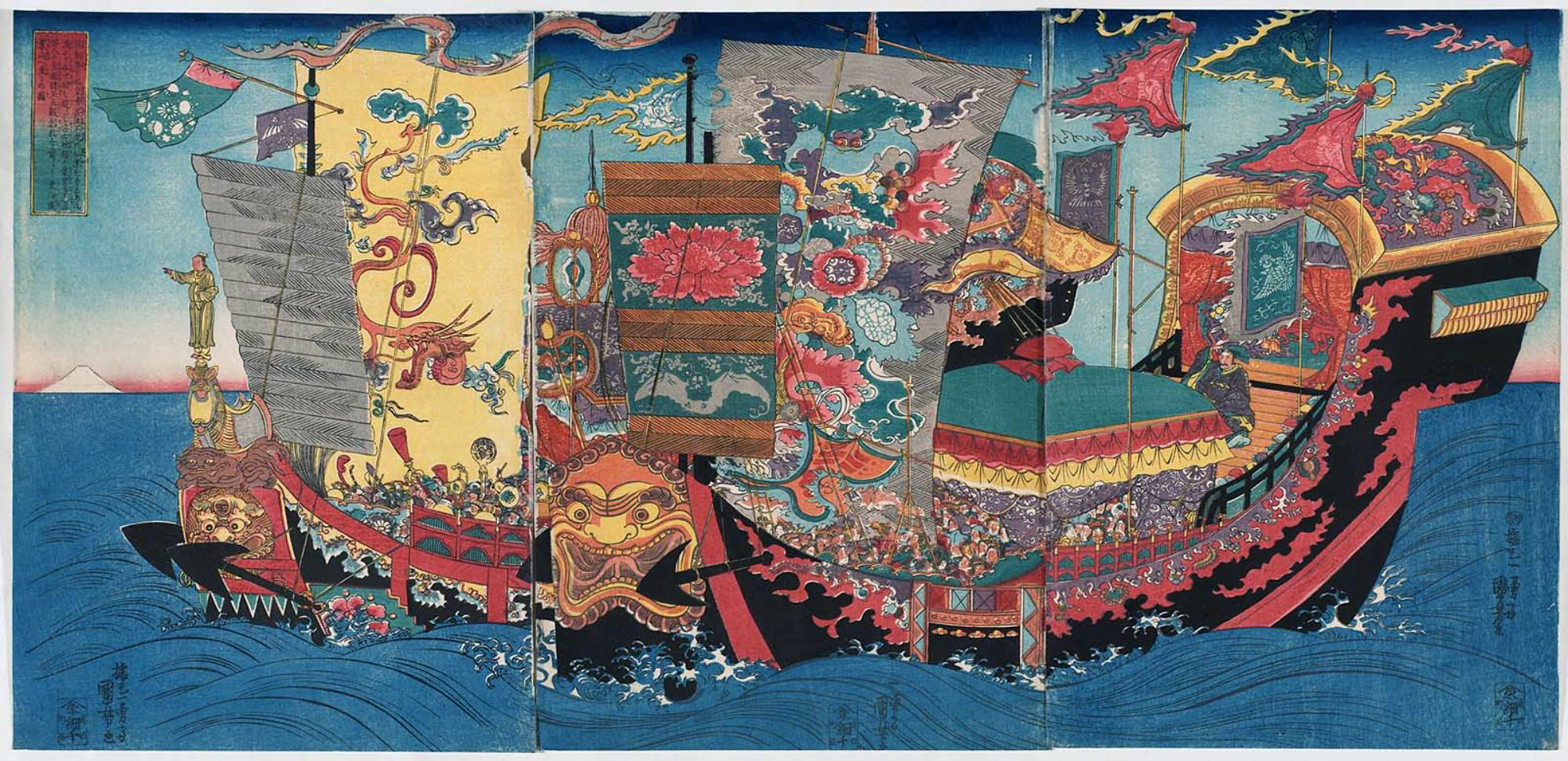
Xu Fu's expedition searching for Mount Penglai, Japanese ukiyo-e by Utagawa Kuniyoshi, c. 1843

Sima Qian's 1st century BCE Records of the Grand Historian mentions Han Zhong as one of five fangshi Method Masters who the first Chinese emperor Qin Shi Huang (r. 221–210 BCE) selected to lead maritime expeditions seeking legendary Daoist Transcendents and elixirs of longevity.

In 219 BCE, Xu Fu (徐福) or Xu Shi (徐巿) from Qi and others submitted a memorial to the throne requesting to search for the xian Transcendents who reportedly lived on three hidden islands in the East Sea, Penglai (蓬萊), Fangzhang (方丈), and Yingzhou (瀛洲). The emperor ordered him to take a flotilla with "several thousand young men and maidens" and locate these supernatural islands.

In 215 BCE, during Qin Shi Huang's fourth imperial inspection tour of northeast China, he commissioned more naval expeditions searching for Transcendental drugs. First, when the emperor was visiting Mount Jieshi (碣石山, in Hebei) he commanded Scholar Lu (盧生), from Yan, to find the Transcendent Xianmen Gao (羨門高). When Lu came back from his unsuccessful mission overseas, he reported on "matters concerning ghosts and gods" to the emperor, and presented prophetic writings, one of which read: "Qin will be destroyed by hu [亡秦者胡也]." Understanding hu (胡; "foreign; barbarian") in its usual meaning, the emperor ordered General Meng Tian to lead 300,000 troops on a campaign against the Xiongnu barbarians—however, hu was eventually understood as a reference to the emperor's youngest son and hapless successor, Prince Huhai (胡亥, r. 210–207 BCE), whose name was written with the same character. Second, the emperor directed Han Zhong (written 韓終, cf. below), Master Hou (侯公), and Scholar Shi (石生) to search for legendary Transcendents and their "drug of deathlessness" (僊人不死之藥). Their explorations never returned to China and were presumed lost.

In 213 BCE, Qin Shi Huang approved his Chancellor Li Si's proposal to suppress intellectual dissent by burning most existing books, except those on divination, agriculture, medicine, and history of the state of Qin. The rules were draconian, "Anyone who ventures to discuss [the Classic of Poetry or the Book of Documents] will be executed in the marketplace. Those who use the ancient (system) to criticize the present, will be executed together with their families. … Thirty days after the ordinance has been issued, anyone who has not burned his books will be tattooed and sentenced to hard labor."

In 212 BCE, the emperor became resentful that Han Zhong and the other Method Masters had repeatedly lied about being able to obtain longevity elixirs, which culminated with the mass execution of 460 scholars in the infamous burning of books and burying of scholars.

First, Scholar Lu blamed evil spirits [惡鬼] for causing the failures to find "magic mushrooms, elixirs of long life, and immortals" [芝奇藥僊], and suggested, "I hope that Your Highness will not let anyone know of the residence wherein you stay; then the elixir of long life may be obtained". Then, Scholars Lu and Hou secretly met and concluded that since Qin Shi Huang had never been informed of his mistakes, and was becoming more arrogant daily, his obsession with power was so extreme that they could never seek the elixir of longevity for him. Therefore, they absconded, and when the First Emperor learned of it, he was enraged.

"I have eliminated those books which I earlier confiscated from the world and judged useless, and recruited only the literary men and practitioners of [magic] methods and techniques in great number, with the desire to bring about the great peace, and, with the practitioners of [magic] methods, to seek wonderous drugs by means of alchemy [方士欲練以求奇藥]. Now I have heard that Han Chung [written with the variant 韓眾, cf. 韓終 above] has never reported back after he left, and Hsu Fu and his associates have spent cash countable only in myriads, but the elixir is yet to be found. I am only told every day that they accused each other of embezzlement. I respected and treated lavishly Scholar Lu and his like. Now they have slandered me to substantiate my lack of virtue, I will have someone investigate all the masters in Hsien-yang, to see if any of them has spread phantom rumors to confuse the black-haired [i.e., Chinese people]."

He had the Imperial Scribes interrogate the various Masters, who accused and implicated one another to save themselves. The emperor selected 460 of those who had violated prohibitions, and had them trapped and executed.

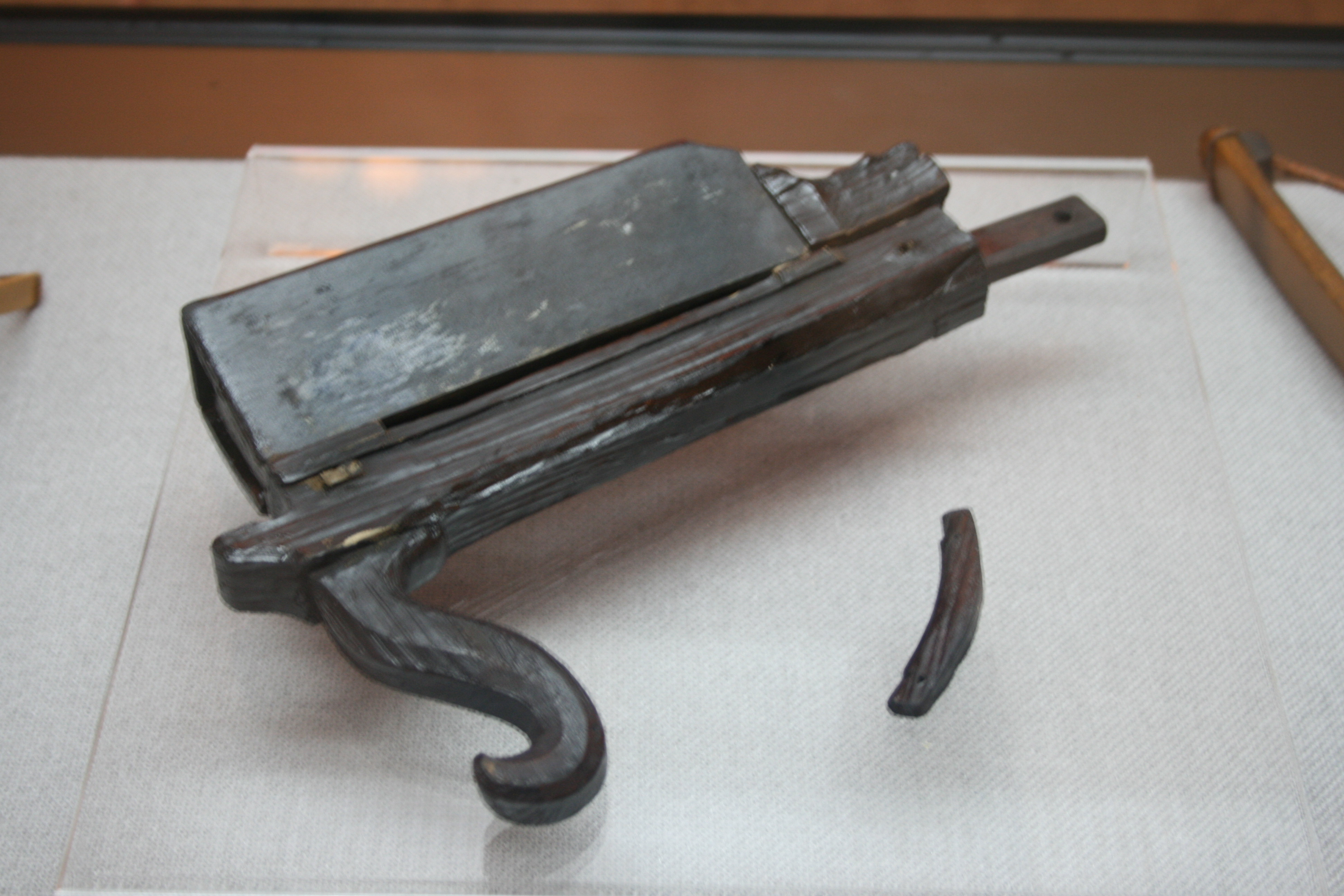
Repeating crossbow mechanism, Warring States period (c. 475–221 BCE)

Finally, in 210 BCE, the last year of Qin Shi Huang's life, Xu Fu and the remaining fangshi worried that the emperor would punish them for their failures to find longevity drugs, and made up a fish story. Xu told the emperor, "The elixir from Penglai was obtainable, but we were constantly troubled by large sharks [大鮫魚], and therefore were unable to get there. We would ask for someone skilled at archery to accompany us, so that, upon seeing the sharks, we could shoot them with automatic crossbows." Xu set sail on a final expedition but never returned. Later tradition has it that he settled in Japan.

Following the Records of the Grand Historian, subsequent official Chinese dynastic Twenty-Four Histories retell Han Zhong's story. For instance, 111 CE Book of Han mentions him in the "Treatise on Sacrifices". "When Ch'in Shih Huang first unified the empire, he indulged in the cult of hsien immortality. Thereupon, he sent people like Hsu Fu 徐福 and Han Chung 韓終 to sea, with unmarried boys and girls, in search of hsien as well as drugs. But (these people) took the opportunity to run away and never came back. Such efforts aroused the resentment and hatred of all under heaven."

=== Liexian zhuan ===
Although the 2nd century CE Liexian Zhuan (Collected Biographies of Transcendents) does not mention Han Zhong, it records calamus as one of 29 psychoactive plants consumed by Daoist adepts. Two hagiographies describe calamus-root subsistence diets. Shangqiu Zixu (商丘子胥) was a master of grain-avoidance fasting who

was fond of blowing the thirty-six-pipe mouth organ (yu) while he herded pigs. At age seventy he had neither married a wife nor grown old. When people asked about the essentials of his way of life he would say, "I only eat old thistles (shu 朮) and calamus (ch'ang-p'u) roots [菖蒲根], and drink water. In this way I don't get hungry or old, that's all." When the noble and wealthy heard of it and tried eating this diet, they could never last through a year before quitting, and claimed there must be some secret formula.

Wu Guang (務光 or 瞀光) was a Xia dynasty loyalist who supposedly refused to serve two Shang dynasty kings four centuries apart. After refusing to work for King Tang of Shang (r. c. 1617?–1588? BCE), he committed suicide by drowning, yet miraculously reappeared to deliver a similar refusal to King Wuding of Shang (r. c. 1254–1197 BCE). According to traditions, Wu Guang's ears were seven cun long (comparable with Han Zhong's pendulous ears), loved playing the jin (琴; "zither"), and subsisted on calamus roots (服蒲韭根). This uncommon term pujiu (蒲韭; "calamus"); with jiu "leek; chives", is related with literary Chinese Yaojiu (堯韭; "Yao's leek; calamus").

=== Baopuzi ===
Ge Hong's c. 318 Baopuzi (Master Who Embraces Simplicity) mentions Han Zhong (韓終) twice and medical changpu (菖蒲) five times.

The "Gold and Cinnabar" chapter lists famous elixirs of longevity, including the Han Zhong dan (韓終丹; "Han Zhong's elixir"), in which calamus is not an ingredient. " Varnish honey and cinnabar [漆蜜]. Fry. When taken, it can protract your years and confer everlasting vision. In full sun you will cast no shadow." "The Genie's Pharmacopeia" chapter says, "Han Chung took sweet flag for thirteen years and his body developed hairs. He intoned ten thousand words of text each day. He felt no cold in winter, though his gown was open. To be effective, sweet flag must have grown an inch above the surrounding stones and have nine or more nodules [ jie 節]. That with purple flowers is best."

This chapter quotes the apocryphal Yuanshen qi (援神契; "Key to the Sacred Foundation") for the Classic of Filial Piety, "Pepper and ginger protect against the effects of dampness, sweet flag sharpens the hearing [菖蒲益聰], sesame protracts the years, and resin puts weapons to flight." It also describes magical rouzhi (肉芝; "flesh excrescences"), notably the fengli, a mythical flying animal, "resembling a sable, blue in color and the size of a fox" found in southern forests. It is almost impossible to slay, except for changpu suffocation, and cannot be killed by burning, chopping with an ax, or beating with an iron mace, but "It dies at once, however, if its nose is stuffed with reeds from the surface of a rock [石上菖蒲]". "The Ultimate System" chapter mentions ancient herbal cures about which people are skeptical, including, "sweet flag and dried ginger [菖蒲乾姜] check rheumatism".

A lost fragment of the original Baopuzi text, which was preserved in the 624 Yiwen Leiju (Collection of Literature Arranged by Categories), connects Han Zhong (韓終) with the shanzhi (山芝; "Mountain Excrescence"): "This is what Han Zhong consumed in order to merge with heaven and earth, prolong life, and communicate with the spirits."

=== Shenxian zhuan ===
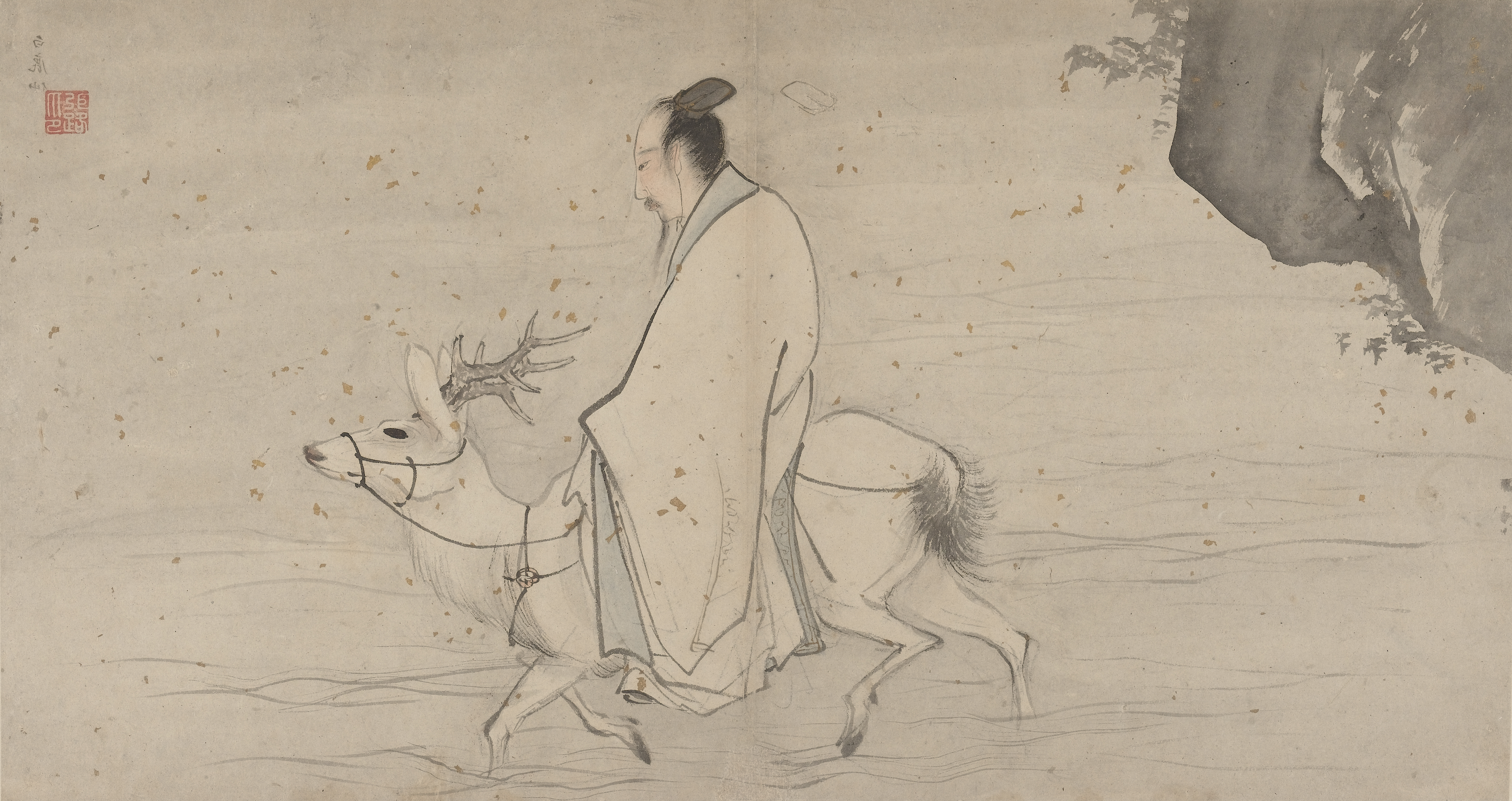
Han Zhong, the Bailuxian (白鹿仙; "White Deer Transcendent"), painting by Zhang Lu (1464–1538)

Ge Hong also compiled the c. 4th century Daoist Shenxian zhuan (Biographies of Divine Transcendents), which mentions Han Zhong in cases of two calamus-eaters.

First, in the hagiography of the Han-dynasty Transcendent Liu Gen (劉根), Han Zhong presented Liu a scripture about expelling the Three Corpses, supernatural parasites that live inside the human body and seek to hasten the death of their host. Liu explained to his student Wang Zhen (王珍) how he met Han Zhong and became his disciple.

I once entered the mountains, and in my meditations there was no state I did not reach. Later, I entered Mount Huayin. There I saw a personage riding a carriage drawn by a white deer, followed by several dozen attendants, including four jade maidens each of whom was holding a staff hung with a colored flag and was fifteen or sixteen years old. I prostrated myself repeatedly, then bowed my head and begged a word. The divine personage said to me, "Have you heard of someone called Han Zhong 韓眾?" "Truly I have heard that there is such a person, yes," I answered. The divine personage said, "I am he."

Liu recounted his multiple failures at studying the Dao without an enlightened teacher, and pleaded for help.

The divine personage then said, "Sit, and I will tell you something. You must have the bones of a transcendent; that is why you were able to see me. But at present your marrow is not full, your blood is not warm, your breath is slight, your brains are weak, your sinews are slack, and your flesh is damp. This is why, when you ingest medicinals and circulate pneumas, you do not obtain their benefits. If you wish to achieve long life, you must first cure your illnesses; only after twelve years have passed can you ingest the drug of transcendence."

Han Zhong then summarized various methods of achieving xian Transcendence, the best of which will allow one to live for several hundred years, and said, "If you desire long life, the first thing you must do is to expel the three corpses. Once the three corpses are expelled, you must fix your aim and your thought, eliminating sensual desires." Han presented Liu with a manuscript of the Shenfang wupian (神方五篇; "Divine Methods in Five Sections"), which says,

The ambushing corpses always ascend to Heaven to report on people's sins on the first, fifteenth, and last days of each month. The Director of Allotted Life Spans (Siming 司命) deducts from people's accounts and shortens their life spans accordingly. The gods within people's bodies want to make people live, but the corpses want to make them die. When people die, their gods disperse; the corpses, once in this bodiless state, become ghosts, and when people sacrifice to [the dead] these ghosts obtain the offering foods. This is why the corpses want people to die. When you dream of fighting with an evil person, this is [caused by] the corpses and the gods at war [inside you].

Following the book's instructions, Liu synthesized the elixir, ingested it, and thereby attained Transcendence.

Second, in an exception to the usual Chinese master-disciple secret teachings about consuming calamus to achieve xian Transcendence, Wang Xing (王興) was a peasant who happened to be on Mount Song and overheard the giant spirit of Han Zhong telling Emperor Wu of Han (r. 141–87 BCE) where to find the best plants.

Wang Xing was a native of Yangcheng who lived in Gourd Valley. He was a commoner who was illiterate and who had no intention of practicing the Way. When Han Emperor Wu ascended Mount Song [in 110 BCE], he climbed to the Cave of Great Stupidity, where he erected a palace for the Dao [a temporary meditation chamber and altar] and had Dong Zhongshu, Dongfang Shuo, and others fast and meditate on the gods. That night, the emperor suddenly saw a transcendent twenty feet [2 丈] tall, with ears hanging down to his shoulders. The emperor greeted him respectfully and inquired who he was. The transcendent replied, "I am the spirit of Mount Jiuyi [九疑, Nine Doubts Mountain]. I have heard that the sweet flag that grows atop rocks on the Central Marchmount here, the variety with nine joints [節] per inch, will bring one long life if ingested. So I have come to gather some." Then the spirit suddenly vanished. The emperor said to his attendants, "That was not merely someone who studies the Way and practices macrobiotics. It was surely the spirit of the Central Marchmount, saying that to instruct me." And so they all gathered sweet flag for him to ingest. After two years the emperor began feeling depressed and unhappy, so he stopped taking it. At that time many of his attendant officials were also taking it, but none could sustain the practice for very long. Only Wang Xing, who had overheard the transcendent instructing Emperor Wu to take sweet flag, harvested and ingested it without ceasing and so attained long life. Those who lived near his village, both old and young, said that he was seen there over many generations. It is not known how he ended up.

The eminent Tang poet Li Bai (701–762) wrote "The Calamus-Gatherer of Mount Song" (嵩山采菖蒲者)", which refers to this Shenxian zhuan story about Emperor Wu of Han.

A divine person of ancient visage,
Both ears hanging down to his shoulders,
Came upon, on Song Marchmount, the Marshal One of Han,
Who considered him a Transcendent of Mount Jiuyi.
"I have come to gather calamus.
Ingesting it, one can extend one’s years."
Thus saying, suddenly he disappeared;
Obliterating his shadow, he entered the clouds and mist.
At his injunction the Thearch was not, after all, enlightened –
His final return was to the fields of Lush Mound.

"Lush Mound" translates Maoling (茂陵), the mausoleum of Emperor Wu of Han.

Shangqing School tradition links Han Zhong with the provenance of several scriptures, such as the Taishang Lingbao wufu (太上靈寶五符; "Five Talismans of the Numinous Treasure"). The manuscript originated with Donghai Xiaotong (東海小童, Young Lad of the Eastern Sea) who gave it to his student Zhang Daoling. He transmitted it to Han Zhong (韓終), honorifically called the Huolin xianren (霍林仙人; "Transcendent of Huolin"), who gave manuscript, partially written in ancient tadpole script, to the Transcendent Yue Zichang (樂子長).

=== Other texts ===
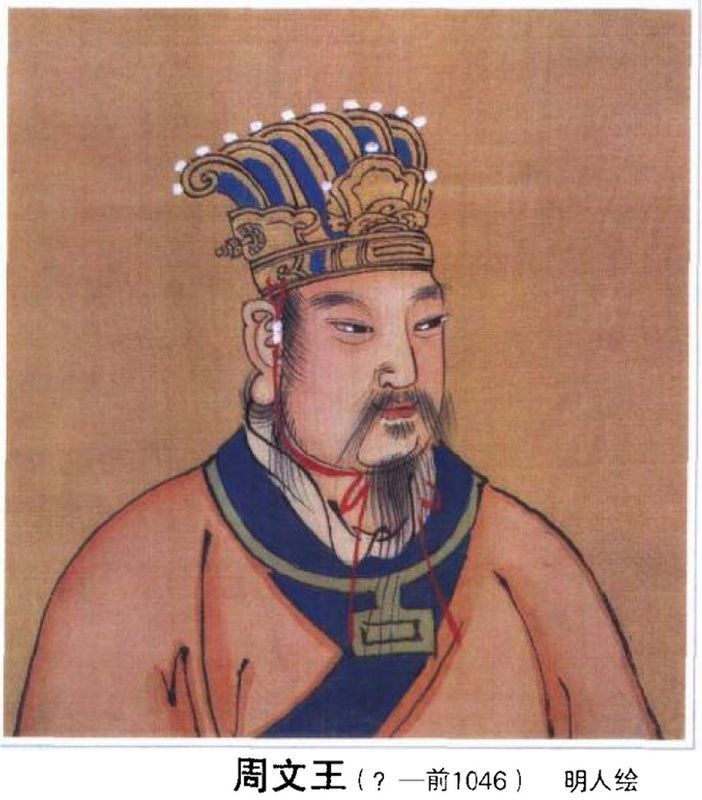
King Wen of Zhou, Ming dynasty painting

Several classics record that King Wen of Zhou (r. 1152–1050 BCE) loved to eat pungent calamus. The 239 BCE Lüshi Chunqiu says, "King Wen enjoyed pickled calamus. When Confucius learned this, he wrinkled his nose and tried them. It took him three years to be able to endure them.". The 3rd-century BCE Legalist classic Hanfeizi compares King Wen eating calamus pickles and Chu Dao (屈到), a minister of King Kang of Chu (r. 559–545 BCE), eating water-chestnuts, neither of which is considered tasty; thus, what a person eats is not necessarily delicious.

The c. 139 BCE Huainanzi uses calamus to exemplify things that bring small benefits but great harm, "Calamus deters fleas and lice, but people do not make mats out of it because it attracts centipedes."

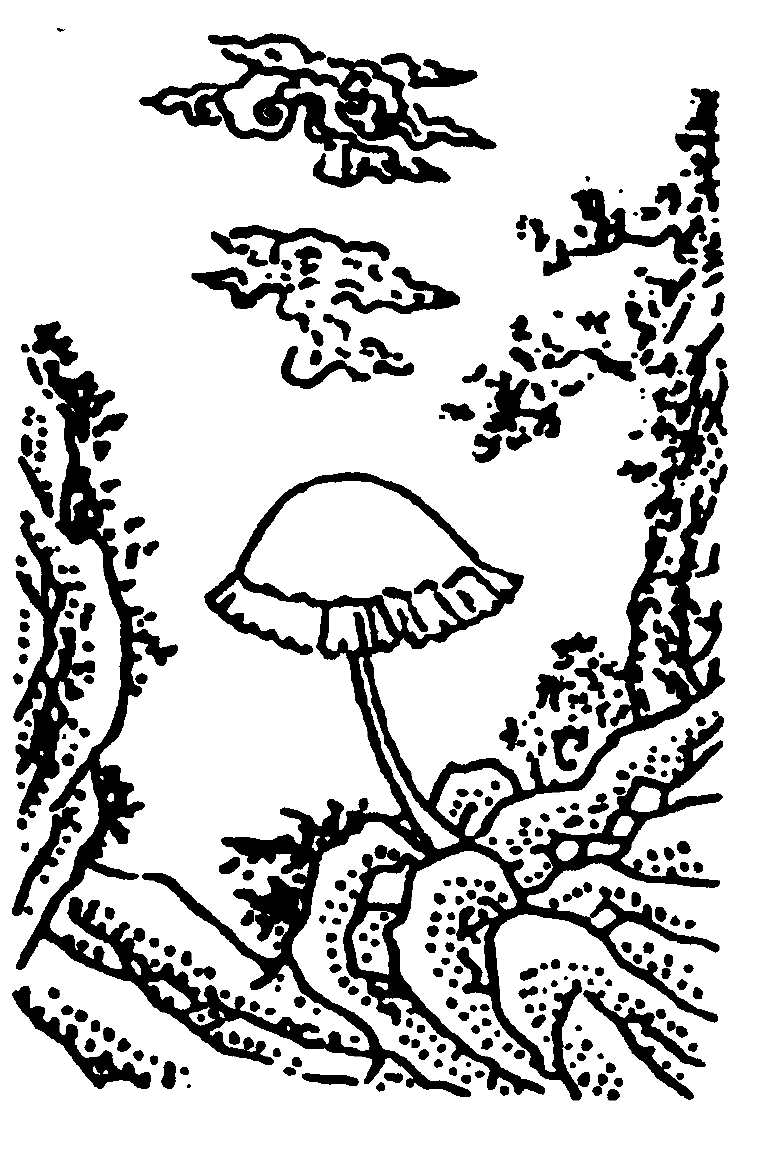
Jinqingzhi (金精芝; "Metal Essence Excrescence") illustration from the Taishang lingbao zhicao pin (太上靈寶芝草品; "Uppermost Numinous Treasure Catalog of Excrescence Plants")

Some early accounts of Han Zhong, such as this Music Bureau poem, refer to his iconographic white deer, which he usually rode or sometimes hitched to a flying chariot.

The Transcendent One, astride a white deer:
His hair is short, but his ears so long!
He leads me up Grand Floriate Mountain,
Where we pluck divine herbs, gathering Redflag.
Arriving at the Master’s gate,
We present the drugs – a jade cask full.
The master ingests these drugs:
His body is healthy in but one day.
It strengthens his hair, changing white to black;
It extends his years, lengthening his fated span. . .

The early 11th-century Song dynasty Taishang lingbao zhicao pin (太上靈寶芝草品; "Uppermost Numinous Treasure Catalog of Excrescence Plants") says that Han Zhong (韓眾) achieved spiritual Transcendence after eating jinqingzhi (金精芝; "Metal Essence Excrescence").

Jinqingzhi (Metal Essence Excrescence) grows on Mount Hua. It has a white cap, and white birdlike clouds growing above the stem. Its flavor is sweet and pungent. It should be picked on a ren (壬; "9th of the 10 Heavenly Stems") day in October, and dried in the shade for 100 days. Anyone who eats it will live for 8,000 years. After eating this excrescence Han Zhong became a Transcendent. [金精芝生於華山白蓋莖上有白雲狀如雀雞其味甘辛十月壬日採之陰乾百日食之八千歲韓眾食之仙矣].

Later hagiographies add information that Han Zhong was a native of Deyang district (modern Chengdu, Sichuan), studied the Dao with Tianzhen huangren (天真皇人, August One of Heavenly Perfection), transmitted the Shangqing jinshu yuzi (上清金書玉字; "Golden Scripture with Jade Characters"), and at the end of his life ascended to heaven in broad daylight.

== Calamus in Chinese culture ==
Changpu (菖蒲; "Acorus calamus, sweet flag") is a versatile plant. It is used as an ingredient in Traditional Chinese medicine, an insect repellent, an apotropaic tradition in the Dragon Boat Festival, and an ingredient in "herbal regimes designed to lead to the longevous state of Transcendent being 仙人".

=== Traditional medicine ===
In Chinese herbology, the calamus is considered a "potent herb". It is believed to have stimulant, tonic, antispasmodic, sedative, stomachic, and diaphoretic properties. Preparations, including calamus powder, juice, and tincture are used to treat hemoptysis, colic, menorrhagia, carbuncles, buboes, deaf ears, and sore eyes.

The 3rd or 4th century Lingbao santian fang (靈寶三天方; "Prescriptions of the Three Lingbao Heavens") has an early description of ingesting the calamus rhizome.

Calamus grows near marshes, in damp depressions, on riverbanks, in ditches or on the banks of lakes. It also grows in the mountains on stone. The knotty root [rhizome] with nine nodes per inch is called the Numinous Body. It is foremost in making fast its attainments and contains the vapor of the 10,000 eons. As a result, it is life-giving and nurtures seminal essence and spirit. It repels water, guards against damps, represses demons, and dissolves [spirit-incurred] calamities, [so that] Guimei 鬼魅 and Wangliang 魍魎 demons are driven into the murky dark and the spirits of the unburied dead and violently murdered dare not approach. If you ingest it without ceasing, your life span will reach a thousand thousands.

Praised as a lingcao (靈草; "celestial herb") in Daoist texts, the calamus was believed to increase longevity, improve memory, and "heal a thousand diseases".

=== Calamus and iris ===
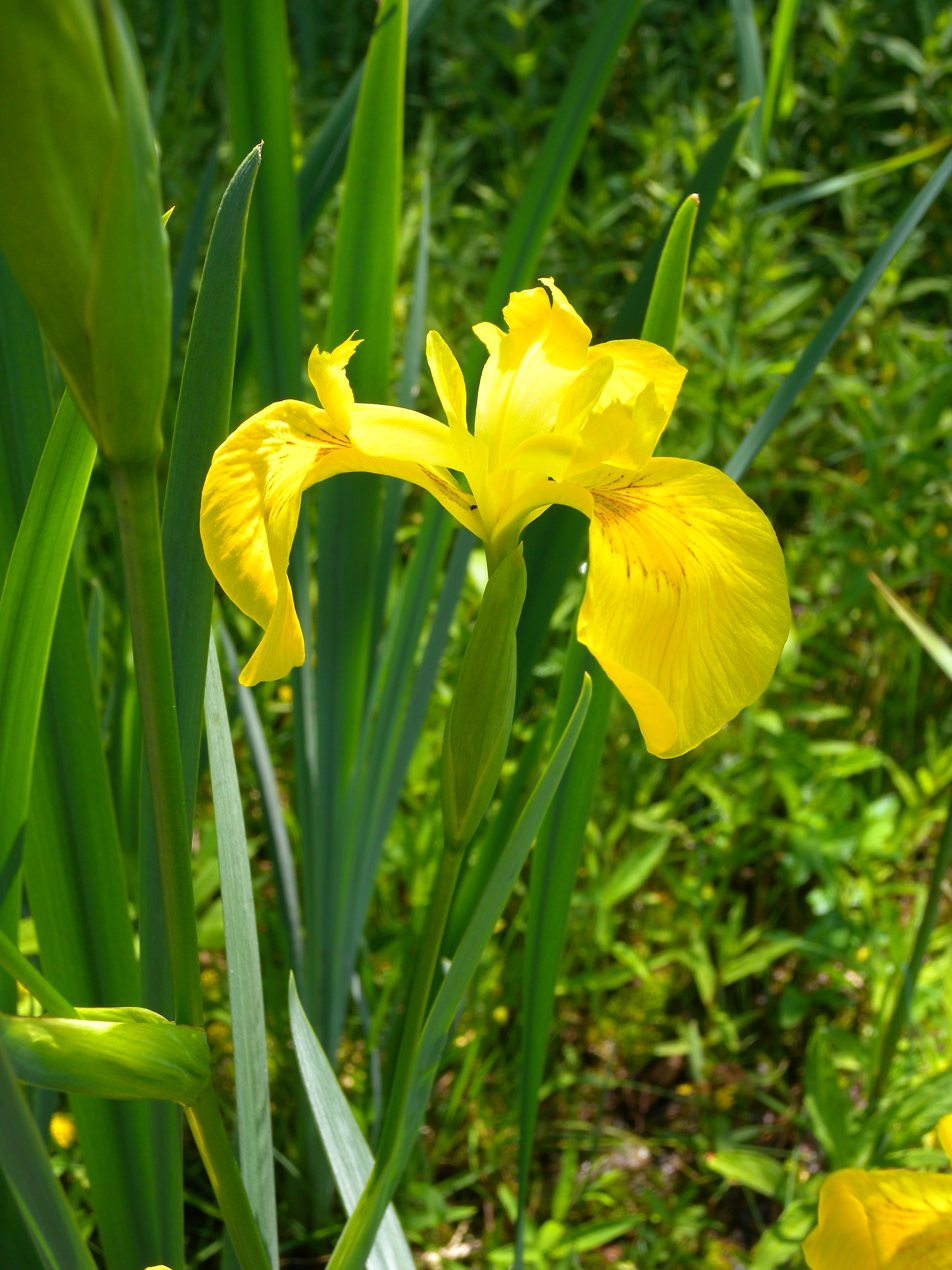
Iris pseudacorus, yellow iris

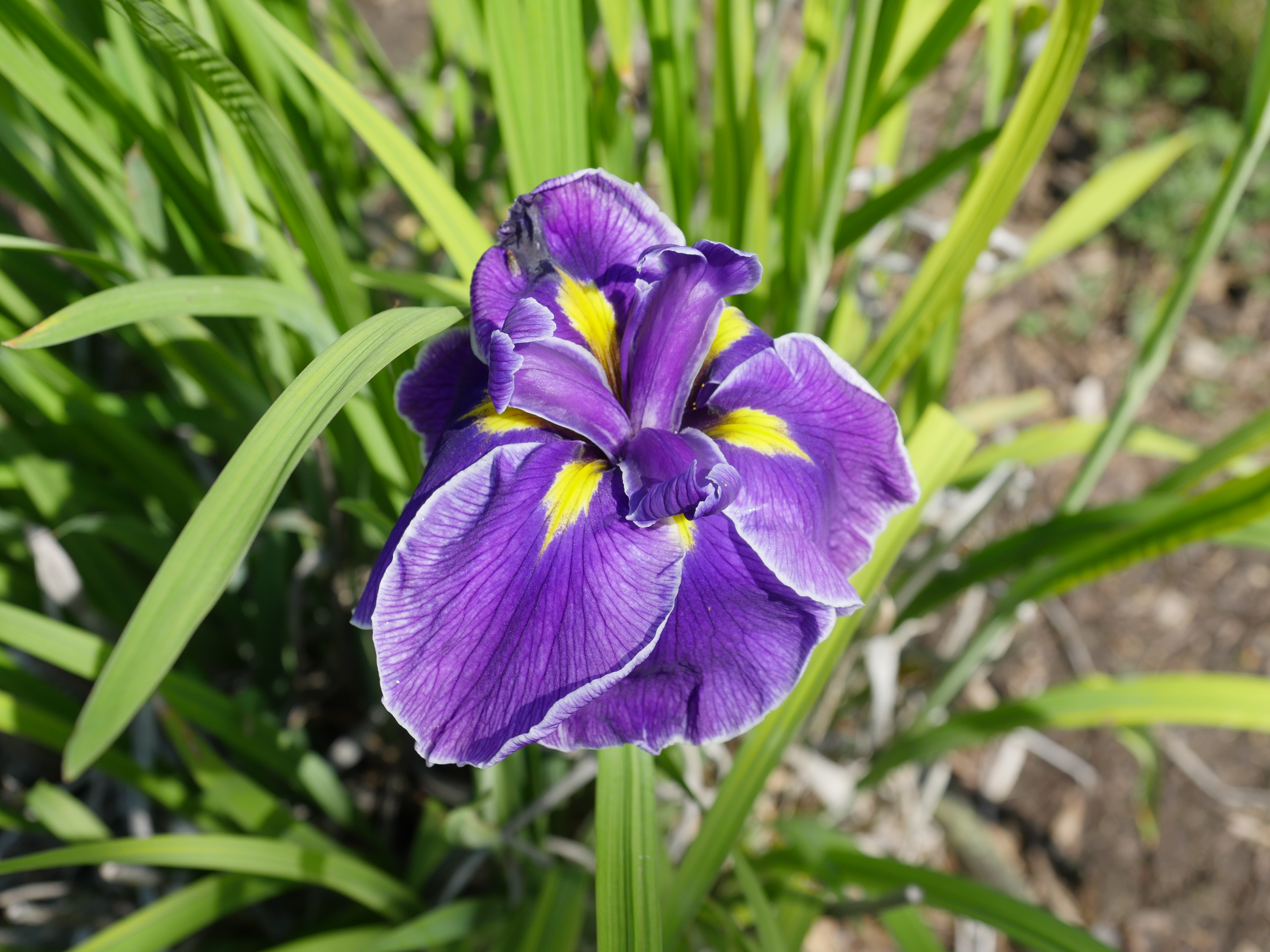
Iris ensata flower

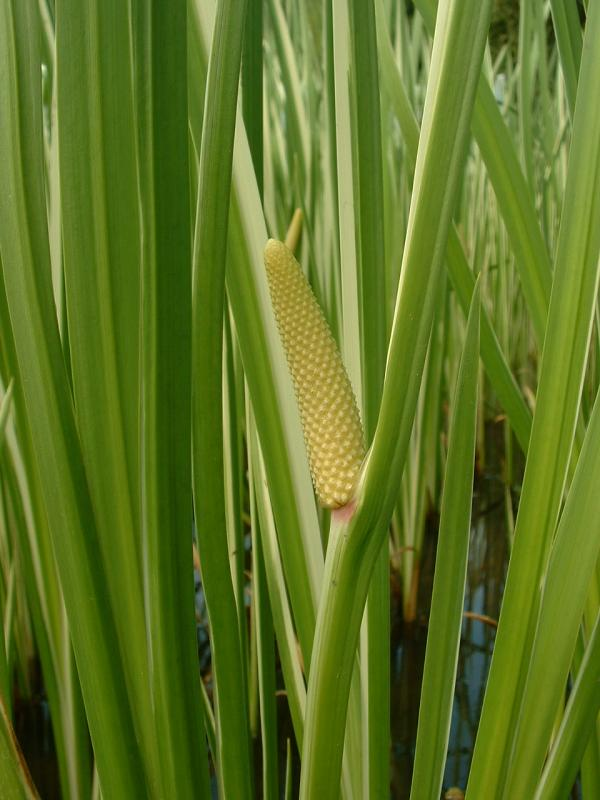
Acorus calamus spadix

Acorus calamus ("sweet flag") was commonly confused with varieties of iris. Both have sword-shaped leaves with parallel veins. The Iris pseudacorus ("yellow iris") provides a good example, its specific name pseudacorus means "false acorus" and refers to their pointed leaves.

In Chinese, the changpu ("calamus") was misidentified with the huachangpu (花菖蒲; 'flowering calamus'; "Iris ensata Japanese water iris"). The above Baopuzi description of Han Zhong eating changpu for thirteen years states that the best variety has zihua (紫花; "purple flowers"), which is obviously not the sweet flag. Acorus calamus has tiny greenish-yellow flowers on a spadix; Iris ensata has large bluish-purple copigmented flowers. Furthermore, Chinese zihua yuanwei (紫花鳶尾; "purple flower iris") is an old name for I. ensata.

The Daoist physician and pharmacologist Tao Hongjing (456–536) was apparently the first to differentiate the Japanese water iris from the calamus:

The true calamus plant has leaves with [central] ridges, like the blade of a sword. Also, in the fourth and fifth months it produces minuscule flowers. In the marshy spots near the eastern mountain streams [of Mao Shan] there is a plant called the Brook Iris 溪蓀, which, in root shape and appearance is exceedingly similar to the calamus which grows on stones. It is commonly called the 'calamus which grows on stones' 石上菖蒲 by the unknowledgeable. This is mistaken. This plant may only be used as an expectorant and to repel fleas and lice and may not be ingested.

Japanese kanji characters can have different readings, categorized as either on'yomi (音読み, "pronunciation reading" from Chinese) or kun'yomi (訓読み, "semantic reading" from native Japanese), and most characters have at least two readings. Japanese clarifies the ambiguity of Chinese changpu (菖蒲) meaning both "calamus" and/or "iris" with Sino-Japanese on'yomi shōbu (菖蒲, "calamus") and native kun'yomi ayame (菖蒲, "iris").

=== Dragon Boat Festival ===
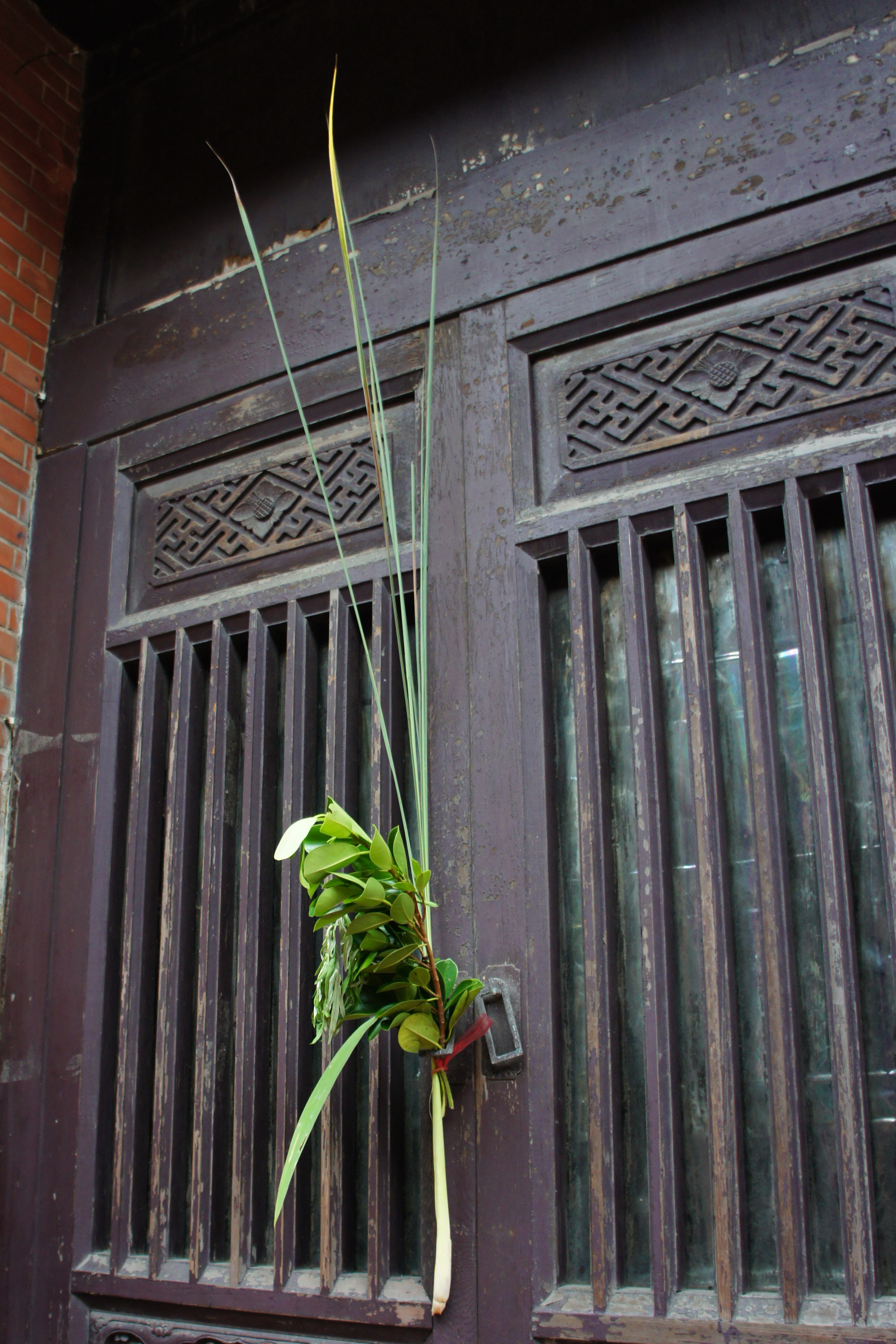
Chinese auspicious plants (calamus, mugwort, and banyan leaves) are hung on the front door to protect against evil spirits during the Dragon Boat Festival.

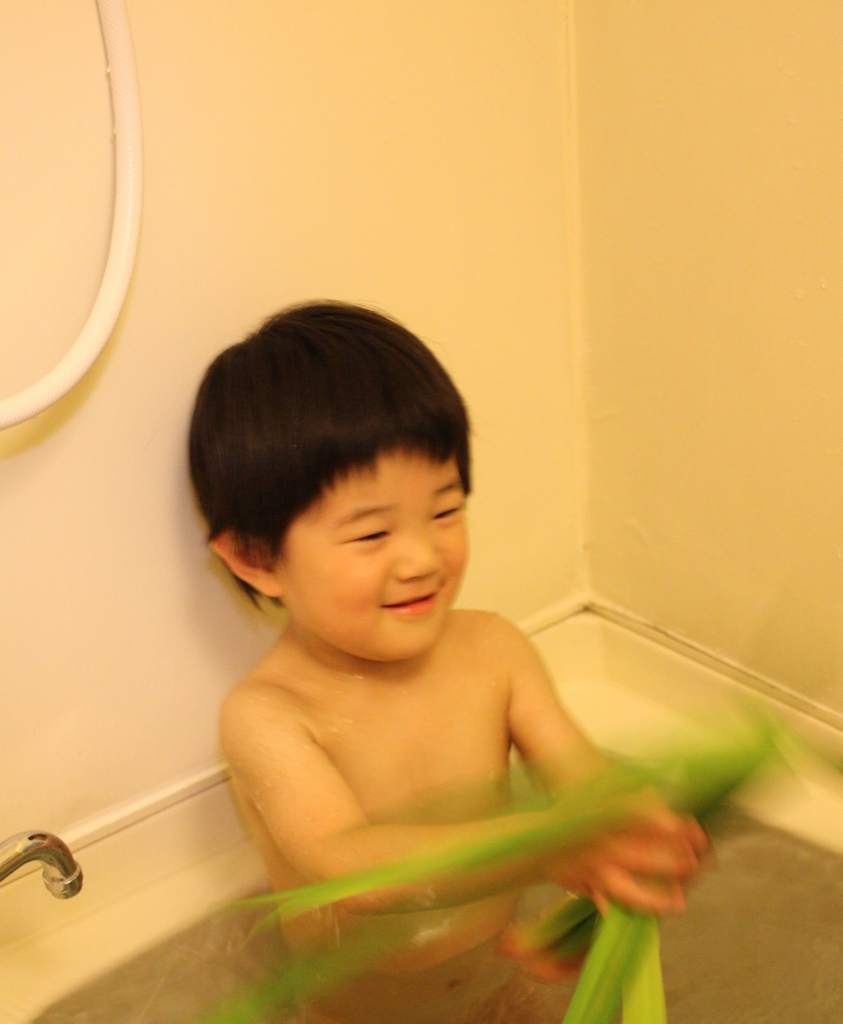
Japanese boy taking a Children's Day shōbuyu (菖蒲湯, "iris bath")

The Dragon Boat Festival, or Duanwu jie (端午節), is a traditional Chinese holiday celebrated on the fifth day of the fifth month in the lunisolar Chinese calendar, generally corresponding with late May to late June in the Gregorian calendar. This folk festival is celebrated by holding dragon boat races, praying for good luck, warding off evil demons, eating zongzi glutinous rice dumplings, and drinking realgar wine (huangjiu ["yellow wine"] dosed with arsenic sulfide).

Calamus, traditionally considered an apotropaic (averting evil) and a demonifuge (chasing away demons), is closely associated with this festival for several reasons. The Duanwu was considered the hottest day of the year, when poisonous insects, malevolent spirits, and epidemic diseases were most active. During the Dragon Boat Festival, a ubiquitous ritual in traditional Chinese households consisted of hanging up mugwort twigs and calamus leaves, tied with a red thread, above the front door, in order to ward off evil. Sometimes the root was cut into the shape of a man and worn on the person.

In addition to realgar wine, Chinese people would drink wine infused with calamus root "to ward off the damp vapors." Both calamus and iris are insect repellents, particularly useful against mosquitoes and fleas, which may have helped reduce the spread of disease. A sharply pointed calamus leaf, called a pujian (蒲劍; "calamus sword"), was considered an effective apotropaic weapon. Mugwort tigers combined with calamus swords could allegedly drive off ghostly and poisonous beings. Another reason is the resemblance of calamus leaves to swords. The Dragon Boat Festival doucao (闘草; "battle with herbs") observance may well have originated as a demon-quelling sword in some sort of religious drama.

The baicaotang (百草湯; "bath of a hundred herbs") is another Duanwu ritual. Although the herbs for this decoction varied from region to region, it often included calamus, mugwort, and mulberry leaves, and occasionally chrysanthemum flowers and peach twigs. The herbs should be picked in the early morning of the Duanwu, boiled down, and used as an herbal bath later in the afternoon.

In Japan, the Chinese Dragon Boat Festival or Double Fifth Festival is celebrated on May 5 as Tango no sekku (端午の節句). Until recently, Tango no sekku was known as Boys' Day, with a Shinto holiday counterpart of Hinamatsuri Dolls' Day or Girls' Day celebrated on March 3. In 1948, the government changed May 5 to be a national holiday called Kodomo no hi or Children's Day that includes both boys and girls.

Japanese shōbu (菖蒲, "calamus") and ayame (菖蒲, "iris") are written with the same kanji' characters. While the calamus is the traditional apotropaic plant in the Chinese Dragon Boat Festival, it was changed to the iris in the Japanese Children's Day Festival. The Chinese baicaotang calamus bath corresponds to the Japanese shōbuyu (菖蒲湯, "iris bath"). Glutinous rice dumplings, both Chinese zongzi and Japanese chimaki, are usually wrapped in bamboo leaves and steamed, but calamus leaves are specially used for the Dragon Boat Festival and iris leaves for Children's Day. While realgar wine is not a Japanese tradition, drinking iris-infused sake corresponds to calamus-infused Chinese wine in order to ward off evil during the Double Fifth Festival.

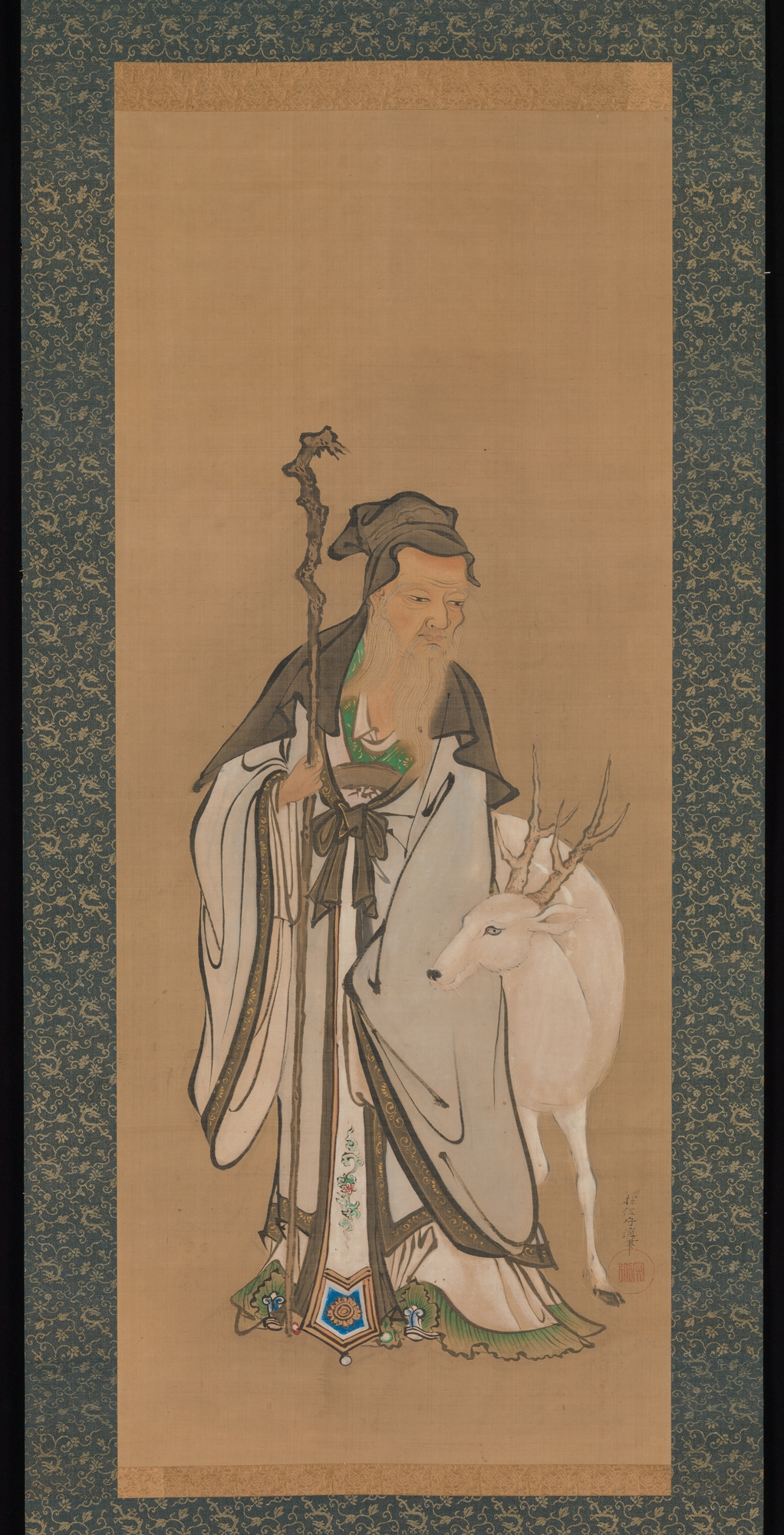
Jurōjin with white deer, hanging scroll by Kanō Tanshin (1653–1718)

== See also ==
- Qin Shi Huang's imperial tours
- Jurōjin, Japanese god of longevity, often depicted with a white deer
