= Ji Zheng =

Ji Zheng may refer to:

- Marquis Zheng of Yan (died 729 BC), name Ji Zheng, king of Yan during the Spring and Autumn period of China
- King Xiang of Zhou (died 619 BC), name Ji Zheng, king of the Chinese Zhou dynasty
- Chi Cheng (athlete) (born 1944), or Ji Zheng, Taiwanese track and field athlete

== See also ==
- Chi Cheng (disambiguation)
- Zheng Ji (disambiguation)
