= Guixu =

Mystical land in Chinese mythology

- Genre: Chinese mythology

In-universe information
- Type: Xianjing
- Races: Xian,loong

Guixu
- Traditional Chinese: 归墟
- Simplified Chinese: 歸墟
Transcriptions
Standard Mandarin
- Hanyu Pinyin: guī xū

Guixu (simplified Chinese: 归墟; traditional Chinese: 歸墟) is a location in Chinese mythology where all water, including the Milky Way, flows into a bottomless void. Even as water keeps flowing into it, the amount of water in it never changes. The term is a conglomeration of the characters for "return (to)" and "ruins". In interpretations of Guixu, the xu is sometimes conflated with its homophone, the Taoist concept of xu (虚), or an equilibrium state of emptiness or purity that one achieves through attunement with the Dao.

== Guixu in Liezi ==
In the Taoist text Liezi, Guixu is located billions of li East of the Bohai Sea. There, all the water in the world flows. As the ancient Chinese considered the Milky Way to be a river of stars, they also believed all the stars in the Milky Way flowed into Guixu.

Floating atop Guixu were five sacred mountains - Penglai, Fanghu or Fangzhang, Yingzhou, Daiyu and Yuanjiao.

The mountains were inhabited by xian and beasts who flew from one mountain to another. The tops of the mountains were said 9000 li wide and 70,000 li apart from each other. Its flat terraces were said to be made of gold, jade, and onyx. Eating the fruits of the trees atop the mountains granted immortality and everlasting youth.

In order to make sure the mountains stayed stable for the xian, the ruler of the heavens ordered Yuqiang to command fifteen ao to stabilize the five mountains. The turtle is a legendary creature in Chinese mythology that is believed to have the power to cause earthquakes, as well as changes in the sea, mountains, and rivers. The fifteen ao were split into three groups who switched shifts once every 60,000 years. However, in the nearby Longbo Kingdom there lived giants whose strides were so large they could walk over to the mountains and fish six ao out. The Longbo giants burned the bones of the ao for oracle bone divination. As a result, the Daiyu and Yuanjiao mountains floated to the edge of the sea and sank. Billions of xian were forced to evacuate their homes. As punishment, the heavenly emperor cursed the Longbo Kingdom to shrink in area over time, forcing its people to also shrink in size to adapt.

== Connection to Ganyuan ==
Guixu is sometimes considered another name for Ganyuan (甘渊). Historian Guo Pu's annotations of mythology text Shanhaijing says Ganyuan was named so because all the waters consolidated there to become a deep pool. Like Guixu, Ganyuan is mentioned in Shanhaijing as located in the East of the Bohai Sea. However, another part of Shanhaijing claims Ganyuan is located in the Southeast instead of the East.

According to Shanhaijing and Chuci, Ganyuan is also the home of the solar goddess Xihe, who gave birth to ten suns. There, Xihe bathed the suns while they rested during the night until nine of them were shot down by Houyi.

== In popular culture ==
Guixu is a common location name in Chinese popular culture, especially in xianxia stories. Guixu is often depicted as a black hole-like void or whirlpool that sucks everything into it.

In The Ferryman (灵魂摆渡), Guixu is a deep underwater kingdom where those lost in the sea are sucked in. There, they are eaten by the jiaoren who lives there. The jiaoren takes on the form of the ones they eat and returns to land to fulfill the wishes of the people who they eat.

In The Starry Love (星落凝成糖), Guixu is where the primordial chaos hundun was sealed. When broken, a black hole-like void will suck in the entire world and cause it to collapse. Maintaining the seal in Guixu is the main job of the protagonist Shaodian Youqin.

In the Ghost Blows Out the Light book and TV series, Guixu is a whirlpool that hides a lost civilization in the South China Sea.
