= Han Zhong =

Han Zhong may refer to:

- Han Zhong (Daoist) (韓終, fl. 215 BCE), Qin dynasty Transcendent and herbalist
- Han Zhong (韓忠, d. 184 CE), Han Dynasty rebel leader during the Yellow Turban Rebellion
- Hanzhong (漢中), a city in Shaanxi province, China
