= Liu'ao =

Liu'ao may refer to the following places in China:

- Liu'ao, Fujian (六鳌镇)
- Liu'ao, Zhejiang (六敖镇), a township-level division of Zhejiang

== See also ==
- Emperor Cheng of Han, personal name Liu Ao (劉驁)
