= Wild Peony Press =

Australian publishing company

Wild Peony Press was a Sydney-based independent press, dedicated to fostering the better understanding of Asian cultures in English-speaking countries, with a particular focus on Australian scholarship and translation. Founded by Mabel Lee and Agnieszka Syrokomla-Stefanowska, Wild Peony Press was active between 1985 and 2009. The press' work was hailed as "an important move against cultural parochialism" in Australia with its aim "to fill a gap left by the major publishing houses, spreading Asian voices and perceptions into English and through it, Australia and the rest of the world." As such, Lee used to press "to foster greater cross cultural awareness and a better understanding of Asian cultures in the English speaking world." From 1991, University of Hawaiʻi Press undertook international distribution. Initially publishing language textbooks, Wild Peony later focused on literature and culture, including the University of Sydney East Asian Series and World Literature Series, the former referred to by Alison Broinowski as "particularly welcome". After the death of Syrokomla-Stefanowska, Lee became the main driver of the press, which often depended on external funding.

Wild Peony published literary anthologies, the autobiographies of Mitsuharu Kaneko (in the translation of A. R. Davis) as well as the "English works of early [Chinese] migrants" to Australia such as Liu Wei-ping and Stanley Hunt. It also published a study of Chinese-Australian artist Wang Lan, and poetry by Ouyang Yu, Zijie Pan and Subhash Jaireth. Its translations of Asian writers included Arakawa Toyozo, Junko Takamizawa (a biography of Hideo Kobayashi), Jun'ichirō Tanizaki, Nishiwaki Junzaburo, Yi Chung-hwan, Kyunyeo, Xu Xing (writer), Yang Lian, Hong Ying and Zhai Yongming and papers from the conferences of the International Comparative Literature Association. Lee, a translator and friend of Gao Xingjian, used his ink paintings for several of the Wild Peony covers.

== Book series ==
- School of Asian Studies series
- University of Sydney East Asian Series
- University of Sydney World Literature Series
- Wild Peony Art Series
- Wild Peony Asian Studies Series
- Wild Peony Autobiography Series
- Wild Peony Chinese Language Series
- Wild Peony Poetry Series
