= Burning of books and burying of scholars =

Qin dynasty purge of heterodoxy (213–212 BCE)

- Traditional Chinese: 焚書坑儒
- Simplified Chinese: 焚书坑儒
- Literal meaning: burning texts, burying scholars
Transcriptions
Standard Mandarin
- Hanyu Pinyin: fénshū kēngrú
- Gwoyeu Romatzyh: fernshu kengru
- Wade–Giles: fen^{2}-shu^{1} k'eng^{1}-ju^{2}
- IPA: [fə̌n.ʂú kʰə́ŋ.ɻǔ]
Yue: Cantonese
- Yale Romanization: fàhn-syū hāang-yùh
- Jyutping: fan4-syu1 haang1-jyu4
Southern Min
- Tâi-lô: hûn-tsu khenn-lû
Middle Chinese
- Middle Chinese: bɨun ɕɨʌ kʰˠæŋ ȵɨo
Old Chinese
- Baxter–Sagart (2014): *bun s-ta kʰˤreŋ nyu

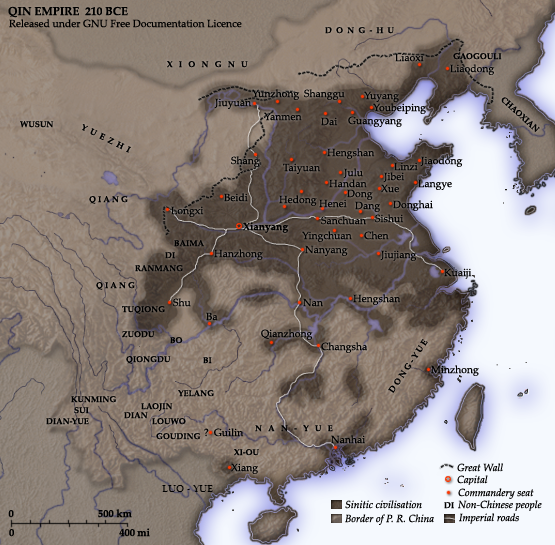
The Qin dynasty in 210 BCE Qin region Outlying regions

The burning of books and burying of scholars were purported acts of intellectual suppression by the Chinese emperor Qin Shi Huang starting in 213 BCE. That year the emperor ordered destruction of books that praised the defeated pre-imperial states. The following year he is said to have ordered 460 scholars buried alive for withholding forbidden books. The events were alleged to have destroyed philosophical treatises of the Hundred Schools of Thought, with the goal of strengthening the official Qin governing philosophy of Legalism.

Modern historians doubt the details of the story, which first appeared more than a century later in the Han dynasty official Sima Qian's Records of the Grand Historian. As a court scholar, Sima had every reason to denigrate the earlier emperor to flatter his own, but later Confucians did not question the story. According to the historian Ulrich Neininger, their message was, "If you take our life, Heaven will take the life of your dynasty."

Modern scholars agree that Qin Shi Huang gathered and destroyed many works that he regarded as incorrect or subversive. He ordered two copies of each text to be preserved in imperial libraries. Some were destroyed in the fighting following the fall of the dynasty. He had scholars killed, but not by being buried alive, and the victims were not rú (Chinese: 儒; lit. 'Confucians'), since that school had not yet been formed as such.

== Traditional version ==
Ancient Chinese book events

'[1]' Book burning of the First Qin Emperor
'[2]' Wang Mang's capital Chang'an was attacked and the imperial palace ransacked. Wang died in the battle and, at the end, forces burned the national library of Weiyang Palace.
'[3]' At the end of the Han dynasty, the Three Kingdoms dissipated of the state library by upheavals that resulted from the Wei (魏), Shu (蜀), and Wu (吳) contests
'[4]' At the end of Yang-Jia turbulence, dissipation of the state library by the upheavals of Western Jin.
'[5]' Emperor Yuan of the Liang dynasty surrounded by the Western Wei army in his castle; Yuan set fire to the collection of national records.

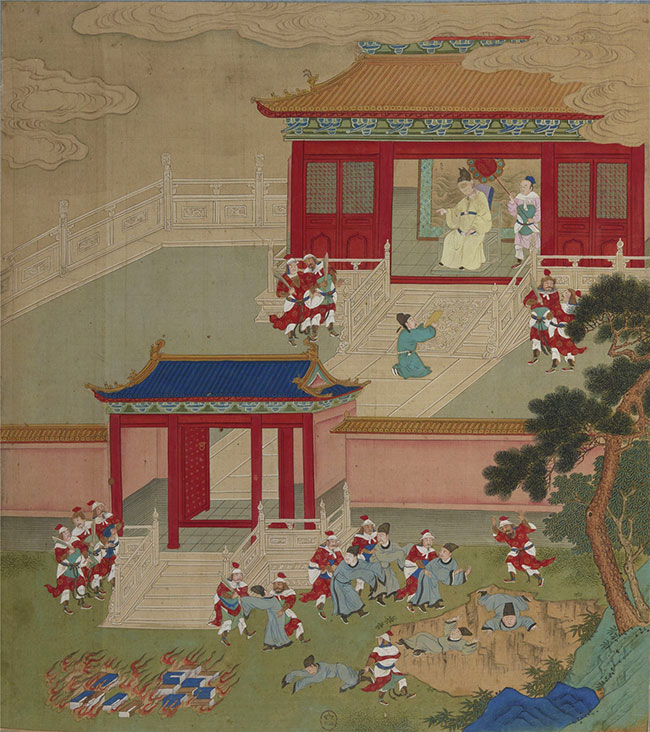
Killing the Scholars and Burning the Books, anonymous 18th century Chinese painted album leaf; Bibliothèque nationale de France, Paris

=== Punishment of the scholars ===
According to Sima Qian's Records of the Grand Historian, after Qin Shi Huang, the first emperor of China, unified China in 221 BCE, his chancellor Li Si suggested suppressing intellectual discourse to unify thought and political opinion.

Chancellor Li Si said: "I, your servant, propose that all historians' records other than those of Qin's be burned. Except the academics whose duty includes possessing books, if anyone under heaven has copies of the Shi Jing [Classic of Poetry], the Shujing [Classic of History], or the writings of the hundred schools of philosophy, they shall deliver them (the books) to the governor or the commandant for burning. Anyone who dares to discuss the Shi Jing or the Classic of History shall be publicly executed. Anyone who uses history to criticize the present shall have his family executed. Any official who sees the violations but fails to report them is equally guilty. Anyone who has failed to burn the books after thirty days of this announcement shall be subjected to tattooing and be sent to build the Great Wall. The books that have exemption are those on medicine, divination, agriculture, and forestry. Those who have interest in laws shall instead study from officials.

— Shi Ji (Record of the Grand Historian, Chapter 6. "The Basic Annals of the First Emperor of Qin" thirty-fourth year (213 BCE) (Note: 相李斯曰：「臣請史官非秦記皆燒之。非博士官所職，天下敢有藏詩、書、百家語者，悉詣守、尉雜燒之。有敢偶語詩書者棄市。以古非今者族。吏見知不舉者與同罪。令下三十日不燒，黥為城旦。所不去者，醫藥卜筮種樹之書。若欲有學法令，以吏為師。)

Three categories of books were viewed by Li Si to be most dangerous politically. These were poetry (particularly the Classic of Poetry), history (Shujing and especially historical records of other states than Qin), and philosophy. The ancient collection of poetry and historical records contained many stories concerning the ancient virtuous rulers. Li Si believed that if the people were to read these works they were likely to invoke the past and become dissatisfied with the present. The reason for opposing various schools of philosophy was that they advocated political ideas often incompatible with the totalitarian regime.

==== Consequences ====
The extent of the damage to Chinese intellectual heritage is difficult to assess, for details have not been recorded in history. Several facts, however, indicate that the consequences of this event, although enduring, were not extensive. First, it is recorded in Li Si's memorial that all technological books were to be spared. Secondly, even the "objectionable" books, poetry and philosophy in particular, were preserved in imperial archives and allowed to be kept by the official scholars.

In some categories of books, history suffered one of the greatest losses of ancient times. Extremely few state history books before Qin have survived. Li Si stated that all history books not in the Qin interpretation were to be burned. It is not clear whether copies of these books were actually burned or allowed to stay in the imperial archives. Even if some histories were preserved, they possibly would have been destroyed in 206 BCE when enemies captured and burnt the Qin imperial palaces in which the archives were most likely located.

Almost no sources of national histories, identities, or patriotic motifs of the Warring States survived. Pines could trace only songs "Lamenting Ying" and "For those fallen for their country". Both songs are in Chu Ci displaying the Chu patriotism. The rest of the patriotic literature of the Warring States perished. Qin, however, were selective in their biblioclasm. Intellectual traditions "envisioning eternal Empire" were preserved. The biblioclasm of Qin aimed to re-write history presenting the Great Unity as an ancient and universal ideal. This aim was attained perhaps beyond their expectations.

==== Later book burnings ====
At the end of the Qin, the Epang Palace's national records were destroyed by fire. Tang dynasty poet Zhang Jie (章碣) wrote a poem (titled 焚書坑, Fen Shu Keng, "Pits for Book-Burning") about the policy of destruction by both the Qin dynasty and the rebels (of which Liu Bang and Xiang Yu were the examples cited as they entered the capital city Xianyang one after the other.):

As the smoke from burning bamboo and silk clears, the empire is weakened.
The Hangu Pass and the Yellow River guard the domain of Qin Shi Huang in vain.
Pits of ash were not yet cold, disorder reigned east of the Xiao Mountains.
As it turned out, Liu Bang and Xiang Yu could not read.

Original Chinese text

竹帛煙銷帝業虛，
zhú bó yān xiāo dì yè xū
關河空鎖祖龍居。
guān hé kōng suǒ zǔ lóng jū
坑灰未冷山東亂，
kēng huī wèi lěng shān dōng luàn
劉項原來不讀書。
liú xiàng yuán lái bù dú shū

=== Burial of the scholars ===
Tradition had it that after being deceived by two fangshi alchemists, Xu Fu and Han Zhong, while seeking prolonged life, Qin Shi Huang ordered more than 460 scholars in the capital to be buried alive in the second year of the proscription. The belief was based on this passage in the Shiji (chapter 6):

The first emperor therefore directed the imperial censor to investigate the scholars one by one. The scholars accused each other, so the emperor personally determined their fate. More than 460 of them were buried alive at Xianyang, and the event was announced to all under heaven to warn followers. More people were internally exiled to border regions. Fusu, the emperor's eldest son, counseled: "The empire just achieved peace, and the barbarians in distant areas have not surrendered. The scholars all venerate Confucius and take him as a role model. Your servant fears if Your Majesty punishes them so severely, it may cause unrest in the empire. Please observe this, Your Majesty." However, he did not change his father's mind and instead was sent to guard the frontier as a de facto exile."

An account given by Wei Hong in the 2nd century added another 700 to the figure.

== Han Feizi ==
If Sima Qian or Li Si read it, Han Fei's Chapter 50 "Xianxue" (Prominent teachings) is concerned with prominent teachings of its time, considering it "impossible to find intellectual or historical grounds" for their reconciliation, and "understanding the truth of their conflicting claims." In the interpretation of Kidder Smith, Han Fei's epistemology is similar to a court of law. The chapter accepts evidences for presentation and evaluation, but does not accept the claims of dead witnesses, or the possibility of mutual groups being right. It rejects the claims of Confucianism and Mohism as deceitful either to themselves or others. While there may at one time have been a Yao, Shun, Mozi or Confucius, their teachings had since multiplied. Han Fei's "solution" for finding a "politically correct view" ultimately leaves the question of final judgement to administration "created by the power of the ruler", making the chapter more about the role of the ruler as judge-magistrate for the case.

The prominent teachings of this generation are those of the Ru and Mo. The Ru go back to Kong (Confucius), the Mo to Mozi. Since their death, there have been (numerous Confucians and Mohists). Thus, after Kong and Mo, the Ru divided into eight and the Mo split into three. [What each group) accepts or rejects is different and mutually contradictory, yet each calls itself the true Kong or Mo. Kong and Mo cannot return to life, so who will cause the teachings of this generation to be decided on? Both Master Kong and Master Mo took Yao and Shun as Dao, yet what they accepted or rejected was different, while both called it the true Yao and Shun. Yao and Shun cannot return to life, so who will cause the truthfulness of the Ru and Mo to be decided on?

The Yin and Zhou dynasties are more than seven hundred years away, [the Emperor] Yu and the Xia dynasty are more than two thousand years away, so they cannot decide on the truth of the Ru and Mo. Yet to still want to adjudicate the Way of Yao and Shun after three thousand years-[this matter) could not be ascertained! To ascertain something without having conducted an investigation is foolishness. To rely on something that you cannot ascertain is to bring false charges. Those who openly rely on the former kings, if they aren't foolish, are making false charges. The teachings of foolishness and false charges, the conduct of disorder and rebellion-the enlightened ruler does not accept this.

== Skepticism ==
The scholar Michael Nylan observes that despite its mythic significance, the Burning of the Books legend does not bear close scrutiny. Nylan suggests that the reason Han dynasty scholars charged the Qin with destroying the Confucian Five Classics was partly to "slander" the state they defeated and partly because Han scholars misunderstood the nature of the texts, for it was only after the founding of the Han that Sima Qian labeled the Five Classics as "Confucian".

Nylan points out that the Qin court appointed classical scholars who were specialists on the Classic of Poetry and the Book of Documents, which meant that these texts would have been exempted, and that the Book of Rites and the Zuozhuan did not contain the glorification of defeated feudal states which the First Emperor gave as his reason for destroying them. She suggests that the story might be based on the fact that the Qin palace was razed in 207 BCE and many books were undoubtedly lost at that time. Martin Kern adds that Qin and early Han writings frequently cite the Classics, especially the Book of Documents and the Classic of Poetry, which would not have been possible if they had been burned, as reported.

Sima Qian's account of the execution of the scholars has similar difficulties. First, no text earlier than the Shiji mentions the executions, the Shiji mentions no Confucian scholar by name as a victim of the executions, and in fact, no other text mentions the executions at all until the 1st century CE. The earliest known use of the famous phrase "burning the books and executing the Confucians" is not noted until the early 4th century.

Sima Qian reports that the scholars were "keng, 坑", a word that he uses in several other places. The context in these places shows that the meaning is "to kill", not "to bury alive". The character in earlier texts meant "pit, moat" and then took on the meaning of "to trap and kill". Sima Qian used it to describe the annihilation of an enemy army. The misunderstanding came in later dynasties when the meaning of "to bury alive" became common.

In 2010, Li Kaiyuan (李开元), a researcher in the field of history of the Qin dynasty and Han dynasty, published an article titled The Truth or Fiction of the Burning the Books and Executing the Ru Scholars: A Half-Faked History (焚书坑儒的真伪虚实—半桩伪造的历史), which raised four doubts about "executing the ru scholars" ("坑儒") and argued that Sima Qian had misused historical materials. Li believes that the burning the books and executing the ru scholars is a pseudo-history that is cleverly synthesised with real "burning the books" (真实的"焚书") and false "executing the rú scholars" (虚假的"坑儒").

=== Sociological critique ===
After Shang Yang's execution, the Qin retained his reforms, but abandoned his harsh penal policy before the founding of the Qin dynasty. K. C. Hsiao also believed they abandoned his anti-Confucianism. As noted by translator Yuri Pines, the Book of Lord Shang's early chapters of 3,4 and 11 criticise such "fundamental (Confucianistic) moral norms" as "benevolence, righteousness, filiality, fraternal duty, trustworthiness, and honesty". However, such statements are isolated to these few early chapters. Pines considers chapters 3-4 Shang Yang era chapters.

According to the late Qin state's Lushi Chunqiu, King Huiwen of Qin's reign following Shang Yang retained the death penalty for murder, but could be pardoned. In a particular tale, the king offers to pardon a Mohist father's son of execution for murder, because it was his only remaining son. Intending to illustrate Mohism, the Mohist refuses. Despite the earlier strictness of Shang Yang's law, the Qin favors a law considering circumstances and familial relations, versus an impartial Mohist belief in the death penalty for murder. Such laws and pardons might not be literal examples of Confucianism, but they would generally be considered of a Confucianistic ethos.

Representative of the Qin's stratocracy, while a militarist section of the Lushi Chunqiu considers it dangerous for the ruler to listen too much to the numerous views of figures like Laozi, Confucius, Mozi, Yang Zhu or Sun Bin, it withholds individual judgement of them, and the broader work incorporates representative ideas. While not as highly emphasising filial piety, it is evident that the scholars recruited to compose it place a high premium on learning. The Daoistic "Ren shu" chapter tries to convince an ignorant ruler of his superiority, provided he lets his (learned) ministers do the work. The broader Lushi Chunqiu sought to "comprehend all knowledge", making it comparable to the Daoistic Shiji encyclopedia that criticizes the Qin. Militarist section aside, they could in that sense even be classified as Daoist together.

== Pop culture ==
In the TV series "A Step Into the Past", adapted from the book "Seeking Qin", the Emperor of Qin carries out the Burning of Books and Burying of Scholars in order to ensure that in the future, no historical records will be found of the time traveller Hong Siu-Lung, preserving the integrity of the timeline.

== See also ==
- Book burning (Book censorship)
- Censorship (Freedom of thought)
- Four Olds in the Cultural Revolution
- Yumin zhengce
- Great Anti-Buddhist Persecution
- History of China (Chinese classic texts)
- Itzcoatl
- Literary Inquisition
- Twenty-Four Histories

== References and further reading ==
- Chan, Lois Mai (1972), "The Burning of the Books in China, 213 B.C.", The Journal of Library History, 7 (2): 101–108, JSTOR 25540352.
- Goldin, Paul R. (2005), "The rise and fall of the Qin empire", in Mair, Victor H.; Steinhardt, Nancy S.; Goldin, Paul R. (eds.), The Hawai'i Reader in Traditional Chinese Culture, University of Hawai'i Press, pp. 151–160, ISBN 978-0-8248-2785-4.
- Hsiao, Kung-Chuan (1979). A History of Chinese Political Thought. University of Chicago Press. ISBN 978-0-691-61289-8.
- Lundahl, Bertil (1992). Lundahl, Bertil (ed.). Han Fei Zi: The Man and the Work. Institute of Oriental Languages, Stockholm University. ISBN 9789171530790.
- Jiang, Tao (2021). Origins of Moral-political Philosophy in Early China. Oxford: Oxford University Press. ISBN 978-0-19-760347-5.
- Kern, Martin (2010), "Early Chinese Literature: Beginnings through Western Han", in Kang-i Sun Chang; Stephen Owen (eds.), The Cambridge History of Chinese Literature, Cambridge University Press, pp. 1–114, ISBN 9780521855587
- Nylan, Michael (2001), The five "Confucian" classics (PDF), Yale University Press, ISBN 978-0-300-08185-5, archived from the original (PDF) on 2014-06-11.
- Neininger, Ulrich (1983), "Burying the Scholars Alive: On the Origin of a Confucian Martyrs' Legend", Nation and Mythology", in Eberhard, Wolfram (ed.), East Asian Civilizations. New Attempts at Understanding Traditions vol. 2, pp. 121–136 Online
- Petersen, Jens Østergård (1995), "Which books did the First Emperor of Ch'in burn? – on the meaning of Pai chia in early Chinese sources", Monumenta Serica, 43: 1–52, doi:10.1080/02549948.1995.11731268, JSTOR 40727062.
- Pines, Yuri (2023). "Legalism in Chinese Philosophy". In Zalta, Edward N.; Nodelman, Uri (eds.). Stanford Encyclopedia of Philosophy (Summer 2023 ed.).
- Pines, Yuri (2024). Dao Companion to China's fa Tradition. Hebrew University of Jerusalem: Springer. ISBN 9789048129270.
- Pines, Yuri (2024b), Chapter 1 Shang Yang and The Book of Lord Shang. In: Pines, Y. (eds) Dao Companion to China's fa Tradition (PDF), Springer, Cham, pp. 23–56, doi:10.2307/600068, JSTOR 600068
- Sima Qian: "The First Emperor of Qín" Chapter 25 Burning Books & Burying Scholars David K. Jordan University of California San Diego.
- Smith, Kidder (2003). "Sima Tan and the Invention of Daoism, "Legalism," et cetera". The Journal of Asian Studies. 62 (1): 129–156. doi:10.2307/3096138. JSTOR 3096138.
