= Zhang Jie =

Zhang Jie may refer to:

== Writers ==
- Zhang Jie (poet) (c. 877), Chinese poet
- Zhang Jie (writer) (1937–2022), Chinese novelist

== Sportspeople ==
- Zhang Jie (table tennis) (born 1965), Chinese para table tennis player
- Zhang Jie (fencer) (born 1978), Chinese fencer
- Zhang Jie (weightlifter) (born 1987), Chinese weightlifter
- Zhang Jie (wheelchair fencer) (born 1994), Chinese wheelchair fencer

== Others ==
- Zhang Jie (scientist) (born 1958), Chinese physicist and former President of Shanghai Jiao Tong University
- Jason Zhang (born 1982), Chinese singer
- Zhang Jie (voice actor) (born 1978), Chinese dub artist
- Chase Chang (born 1982), Taiwanese musician and former member of Nan Quan Mama

== See also ==
- Zheng Jie (disambiguation)
- Zheng Ji (disambiguation)
