= Zheng Jie (disambiguation) =

Zheng Jie (郑洁, born 1983) is a Chinese tennis player.

Zheng Jie is also the name of:

- Cheng Chieh (鄭捷, or Zheng Jie), perpetrator of the 2014 Taipei Metro attack
- Zheng Jie (鄭捷), a fictional character in Water Margin

== See also ==
- Zhang Jie (disambiguation)
- Zheng Ji (disambiguation)
- Zheng Xie (1693–1765), Chinese painter
