= Xu Xing (writer) =

- Born: March 20, 1956 (age 70); Beijing, China
- Education: Lu Xun Academy of Literature, Beijing Normal University
- Occupations: Writer, Documentary filmmaker, Morden ink painter
- Writing career
- Years active: 1981–present
- Notable awards: Best Short Story Award at Peking University Student Art Festival (1989); French Order of Arts and Literature (2003); Forum Award for Independent Documentaries in China（2011; Guiyuan (归园) Documentary Award in China (2012); Independent Documentary Award at Taida Art Museum in China (2013); the "Outstanding Contribution" Award at the 5th Korea Gwanghwamun Art Festival (2014)

Xu Xing (Chinese: 徐星 born March 1956) is a Chinese writer, cultural scholar, independent documentary director and modern ink painter from Beijing.

== Life ==
Xu Xing, a famous Chinese writer and cultural scholar, published his debut novel Variations Without a Theme (无主题变奏) in July 1985 by People's Literature, which is regarded as a landmark work of Chinese contemporary literature from tradition to modernity.

After graduating from high school in 1975, Xu Xing went to Zhidan county in northern Shan'xi province to jump the queue of working in countryside. He joined the army in 1977 and served in the 21st Corps of Lanzhou Military Region.

In 1981 Xu Xing returned to Beijing after demobilizing from the army. He worked as a waiter and cleaner in Peking Duck House at Hepingmen and began to write. Within six months, he wrote his novel Variations Without a Theme.

The novella Variations Without a Theme was not published until 1985, which aroused a great response and became one of the representatives of "avant-garde novels" in China ("先锋派小说"). The emergence of avant-garde novelists in those years made novel writing take on a brand new form. It made literary discourse greatly break through the narrative and description functions of traditional literary language and created new emotional expression and metaphorical symbolic functions, giving a shock to traditional realistic literary concepts.

Variations Without a Theme won the best short story award at Peking University Student Art Festival in 1989. Later, he published the novellas The Story of A City (《城市的故事》) and Hungry Mice (《饥饿的老鼠》). Short stories, The City That Has Lost Its Song (《失去了歌声的城市》), How Did I Go Mad (《我是怎样发疯的》), Love Story (《爱情故事》), Help (《帮忙》), Martyr (《殉道者》), Don't Cry At the Crossing (《无为在歧路》) etc.; The plays, The Story of a King and a Horse (《国王和马的故事》) and How a Play was Finished... ( 《一出戏是怎样完成的......》); the novel All that Left is Yours (《剩下的都属于你》) as well as the collection of novels, Variations Without a Theme .

In 1989, Xu Xing accepted the invitation of Berlin University of the Arts and left China to live in Germany temporarily as a visiting scholar at the university of Heidelberg. In Heidelberg, he helped resume the publication of Today, the most influential overseas Chinese literary magazine. In the same year, he won the Swedish Kult Tucholsky Prize from Pen Sweden.

Later, Xu Xing accepted the invitation of Heinrich Boer foundation and lived in Boer's home for writing. Meanwhile, he participated in Heidelberg overseas Chinese literature conference.

After returning to China from Federal Republic of Germany, Xu Xing was selected as one of 240 outstanding novelists in the world by France nouvel observateur.

In five years between 1991 and 1996 Xu Xing completed the novel All that Left is Yours (《剩下的都属于你》).

Since 2002, Xu Xing began shooting documentary films. His first documentary Drawing Your Eyes and Eyebrows by the Cliff (《崖畔上画下你眉眼》) was completed in 2002. This year he also hosted "Xu Xing Studio" in the Chinese Language Center of the University of Frankfurt, Germany.

From 2005 to 2007, Xu Xing shot the documentary A Chronicle of My Cultural Revolution (《我的文革编年史》) with France's TV5 TV station. This documentary was based on his personal experiences growing up in the Chinese Cultural Revolution. He tried to integrate personal memory with national collective memory, which may help the two types of memories confirm and support each other so as to provide today's audience with a kind of both individual and public historical statements. This film has been invited by foreign universities for many times to broadcast in the United States, Germany, Italy, France and other places.

Invited by Feuchtwanger Fellowship Villa Aurora, LA foundation, Xu Xing worked as a visiting scholar in USC for one year and screened A Chronicle of My Cultural Revolution (《我的文革编年史》) in University of San Diego, UCLA, University of Southern California, University of Pittsburgh, Harvard University and Columbia University in turn.

He was one of the judges at the 9th and 10th Rome Asian film festival.

As a member of Chinese Literature, Forum Xu Xing was invited to participate in the Aix-en-Provence Asian Literature Forum. Meanwhile, he became a member of Heidelberg State Library Reading Forum.

A Chronicle of My Cultural Revolution (《我的文革编年史》) was screened at La Fondation Maison des Sciences DE L 'homme.

In 2010, Xu Xing began to shoot a new documentary 5+5 in Songzhuang (宋庄), Beijing. The film mainly tells the stories of Lao Jin, the driver of an unlicensed taxi, and artists in Song Zhuang (宋庄). After the film was completed, it was invited to be shown at the university of Venice, the University of Naples in Italy and Columbia University in the United States.

In 1994 and two decades later in 2004, he participated in the St. Malo (France) Literary Festival, an important literary festival in the world. He delivered a keynote speech on Chinese literature, making contributions to Chinese literature.

From 2010 to 2014, he shot the documentary Crime Summary. Most people like to read the history of people with power, status and influence, but few pay attention to ordinary people. Xu Xing accidentally got a pile of prisoners' forms during the cultural revolution. The "criminals" in the tables " were farmers. Full of doubts, Xu Xing carried his camera and went to shoot and interview those farmers in Zhejiang Province. This documentary film has been widely regarded fill the domestic and foreign academic void in the study of the cultural revolution in China rural areas and farmers.

In 2014, Xu Xing won the 5th Korea Gwangwa Gate highest artistic achievement award.

For about 20 years Xu Xing has been invited to attend the academic visit, cultural studies, film screenings and other activities by Harvard University, the University of Pittsburgh, Barnard College, Columbia University, University of Heidelberg, Germany, France Academy of Oriental Language Institute and other universities. In recent years he has been to Yale University, Duke University, the University of Edinburgh, the University of Freiburg, Naples University, University of Milan, University of Venice for academic visits, academic speeches and film screenings.

In 2018, Xu Xing completed the shooting and editing of the documentary The Day of Reckoning (腊月三十日到来).

In 2018, Xu Xing was invited by Boston University to teach Chinese independent film production in spring semester as a visiting professor. In the same year, he was invited by the University of Heidelberg to teach Chinese independent film production in fall semester as a visiting professor.

In 2019, Xu Xing was invited to serve as a visiting professor at Heidelberg University for the winter semester, where he taught a course on the production of Chinese independent documentaries.

In 2024, Xu Xing was invited to Heidelberg University as a visiting scholar.

In 2024, Xu Xing held an exhibition on modern ink painting titled "Control &Flow" in Heidelberg.

In 2024，Xu Xing’s display case at the University of Pittsburgh Library includes materials related to the transfer of Xu Xing's manuscripts from the 1980s, as well as introductions to his films and art exhibitions.

== List of works ==
Xu Xing's major works include the novel All that Left is Yours (《剩下的都属于你》), short and medium stories Variations Without a Theme, The City That Has Lost Its Song (《失去了歌声的城市》), How Did I Go Mad (《我是怎样发疯的》), The plays, Sunday Morning, Somewhere... (《星期天，在某地》), The Story of a King and a Horse (《国王和马的故事》) and How a Play was Finished... (《一出戏是怎样完成的》). His debut novel Variations Without a Theme, published by People's Literature, is regarded as one of the landmark works of Chinese contemporary literature. His works have been translated into English, Japanese, French, Italian, German and other languages.

In 1986, his five short stories were translated and published in Japan. In 1992, Variations Without a Theme was published in French (Le Crabe a Lunettes by Julliard press) and in Italy (by Theorja).

In 1994 All that Left is Yours (《剩下的都属于你》) was published in France by L'Olivier

and nominated for the Prix Médicis étranger Prize in foreign studies. In the same year its German, Italian and Spanish editions were published. Many of his works have been published in Taiwan (1986. Selection of Modern Novels of Mainland China, series 1, 2, Eurasian Press, Taipei), Japan (1989. Modern Literature, Sōsōsha, Tokyo) and Australia (1996. Sydney University Press, Sydney).

In 1995 the story collection Variations Without a Theme and Other Stories was published in English by Sydney-based Wild Peony Press.

Xu Xing's main documentaries are Drawing Your Eyes and Eyebrows by the Cliff (《崖畔上画下你眉眼》), 5+5, Crime Summary (《罪行摘要》), A Chronicle of My Cultural Revolution (《我的文革编年史》) and The Day of Reckoning (腊月三十日到来).

Novels
Novel	Year of publication	Publisher
Variations Without a Theme	1985	The Writer's Publishing House
The Story of A City	1986	
Martyr	1986	The Writer's Publishing House
Don't Cry at the Crossing	1986	The Writer's Publishing House
Hungry Mice	1988	Harvest (literary magazine)
Help	1988	Harvest (literary magazine)
All that Left is Yours (Vol1)	1989	
How Did I Go Mad,	1992	Today (literary magazine)
The City That Has Lost Its Song	1992	Today (literary magazine)

Plays
Plays	Year of publication	Publisher
The Story of a King and a Horse	1992	Today (literary magazine)
How a Play was Finished...	1992	Today (literary magazine)

Documentaries
Documentaries	Year of Production
Drawing Your Eyes and Eyebrows by the Cliff	2002
A Chronicle of My Cultural Revolution	2005–2007
5+5	2010
Crime Summary	2010–2014
The Day of Reckoning	2018

Paintings

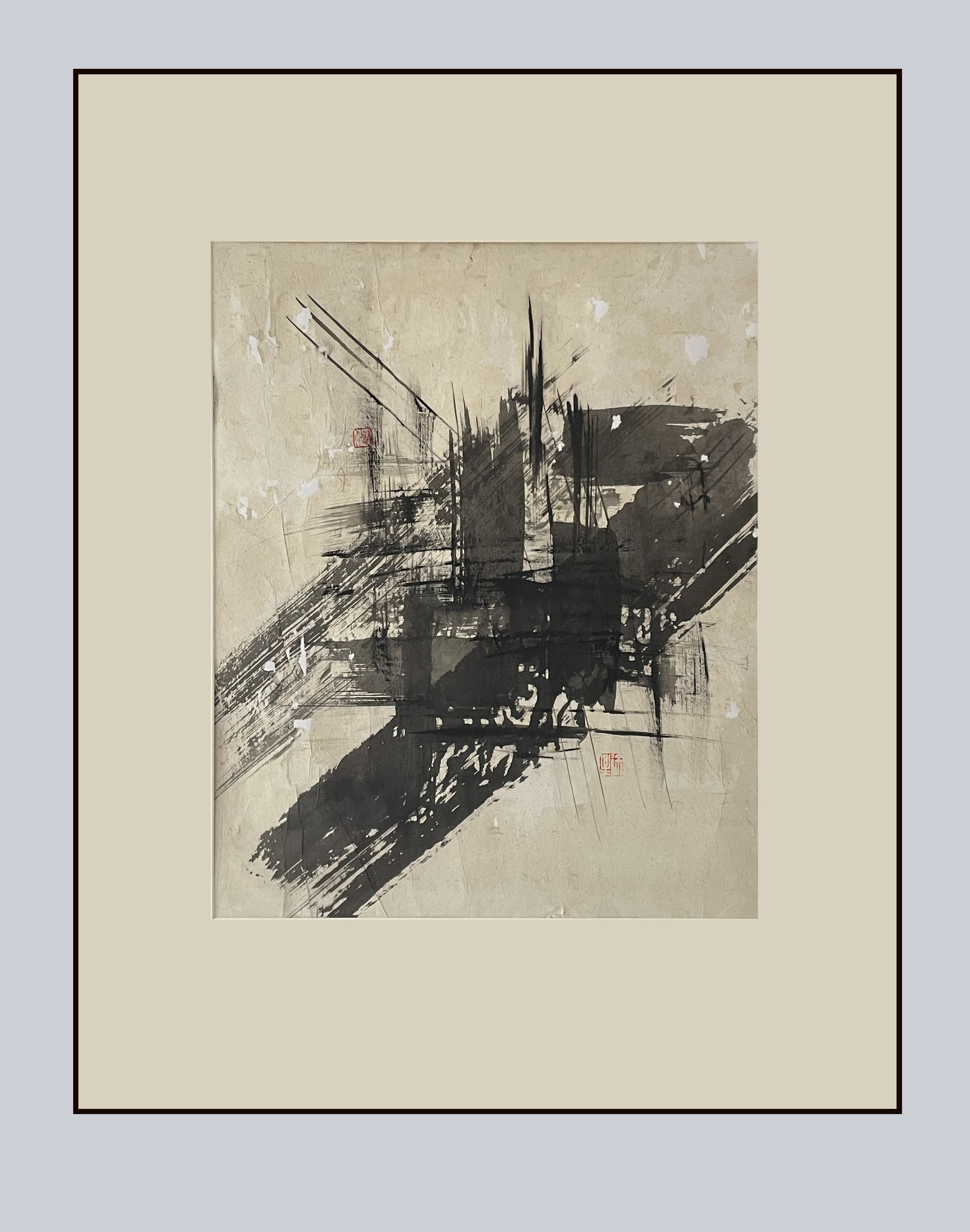

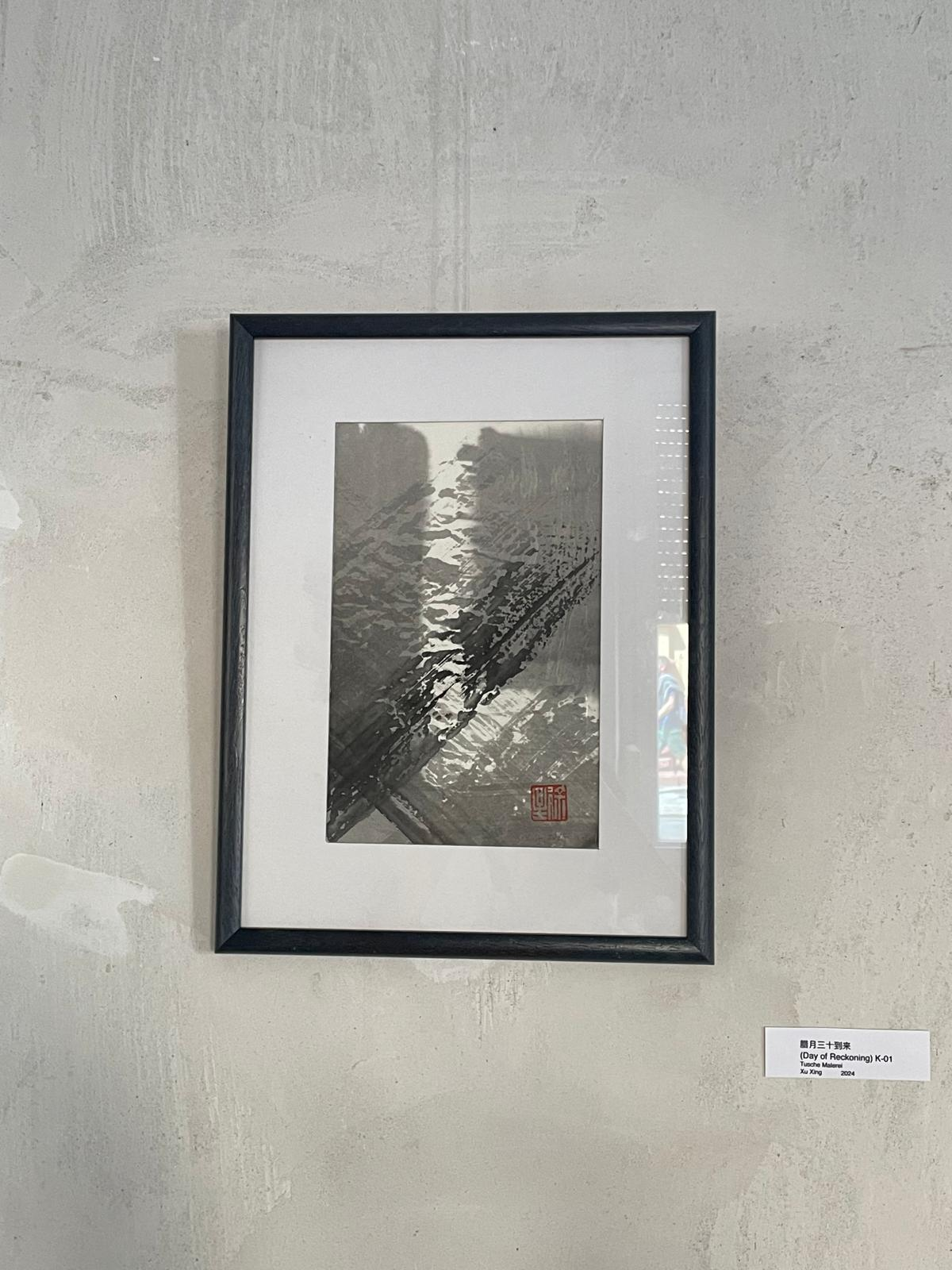

== List of Awards ==
- In 1989, he won the Best Short Story Award at Peking University Student Art Festival.
- In 1990, he was awarded the prize for literature by pen Sweden.
- In 2003, he was awarded the Order of Arts and Literature by the French Ministry of Culture.
- In 2011, he won the Forum Award for independent documentaries in China.
- In 2012, he won the Guiyuan (归园)Documentary Award in China.
- In 2013, Crime Summary won the independent documentary award at Taida Art Museum
- In 2014, he won "Outstanding Contribution" Award at the 5th Korea Gwanghwamun Art Festival.
