= Liu Wei-ping =

- 劉渭平
- Born: Liu Wei-ping (劉渭平); 1915; Beiping, Republic of China
- Died: November, 2003; Sydney, New South Wales, Australia
- Citizenship: Republic of China (1915–2003); Australia (1961–2003)
- Education: Xiamen University; University of Sydney

Liu Wei-ping (Chinese: 劉渭平; 1915 – November 2003) was a key figure in the development of Chinese studies in Australia.

== Background ==
Of a scholarly family from Nantong, Jiangsu and attended Xiamen University. Becoming a Republic of China diplomat, he became Vice-Consul at Sydney in 1945. In that role, he was involved in the repatriation of Formosans to Taiwan from Australia, including on the crowded Yoizuki.

When the People's Republic of China was established, he remained in Australia, obtaining a master's degree in history from the University of Sydney in 1948 and in 1956 began teaching Chinese at the same institution alongside A. R. Davis. He retired in 1980. He published articles on Taoism and late Qing Poetry in the Journal of the Oriental Society of Australia as well as two books on Chinese Australians and an autobiography, Drifting Clouds: Between China and Australia, was published by Sydney-based Wild Peony Press in 2002.

Liu was naturalised as an Australian citizen in 1961.
