= Ao (turtle) =

Chinese mythological turtle

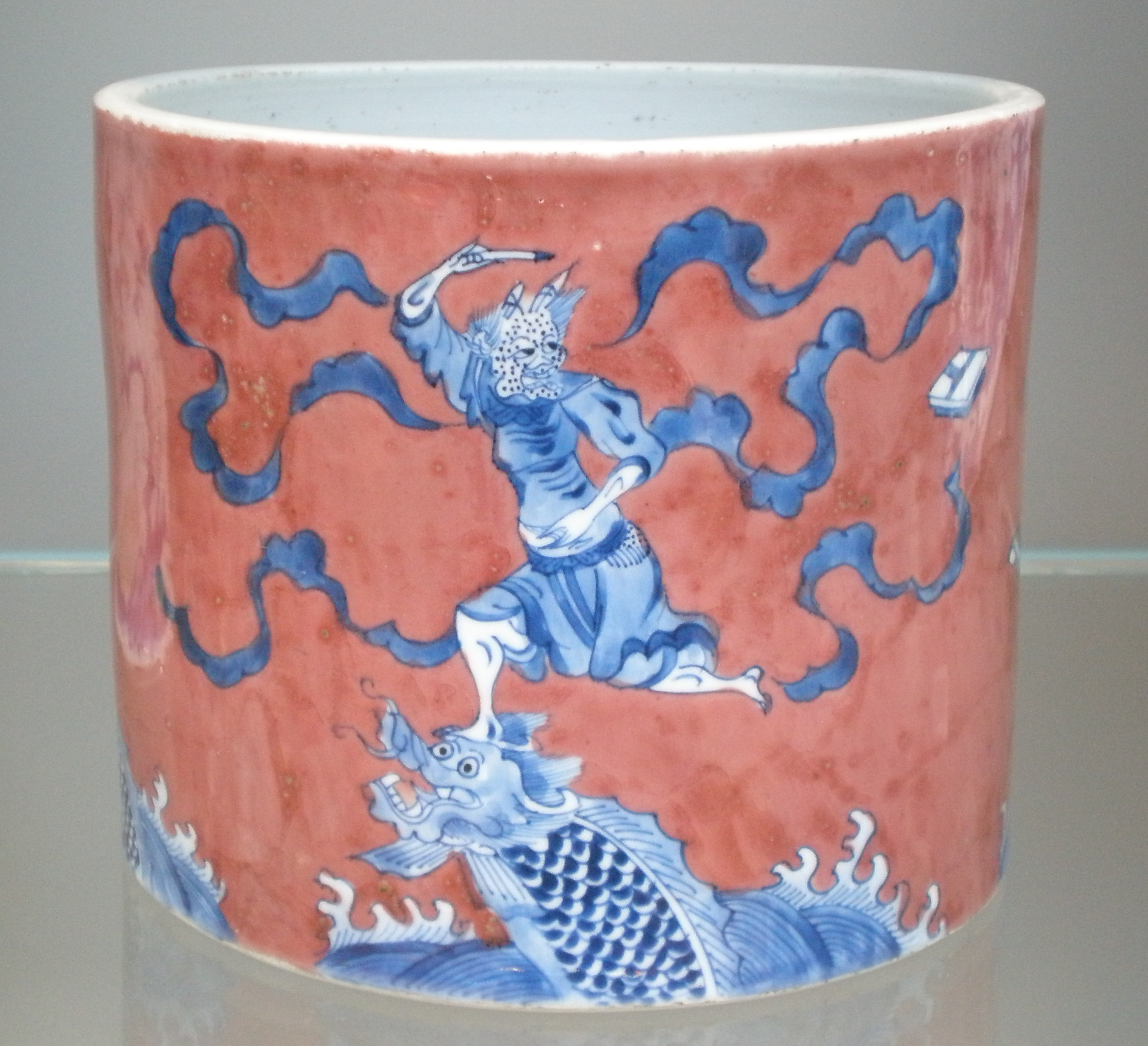
Kui Xing standing on Ao's head

Ao (traditional Chinese: 鰲; simplified Chinese: 鳌; pinyin: áo < Old Chinese (ZS): *ŋaːw) is a large marine turtle in Chinese mythology. He was thought to have lived in the South China Sea during the time of the formation of the world. When the goddess Nüwa, creator of mankind, was repairing the sky after a disaster, she chopped off Ao's four legs and used them as supports.

Another myth claims that Ao still lives and resides in the Bohai Sea, where he carries the three islands of the Eight Immortals (Penglai, Fangzhang, and Yingzhou) upon his back.

He is thought to have been an influence on the later half-dragon, half-turtle figure of Bixi in imperial Chinese sculpture. Bixi was considered a son of the Dragon King who was able to carry enormous weights upon his back; figures of the dragon-turtle bearing memorial stelae are common monuments throughout East Asia.

== In toponymy ==
While place names using the word gui ("turtle") are ubiquitous throughout China (typically referring to a turtle-shaped hill, gui shan), place names referring to an ao are more characteristic of China's southeastern coast (Zhejiang to Guangdong). This includes the Ao River (Aojiang) in southern Zhejiang, with the town of Aojiang on its northern shore, as well as the Liu'ao ("Six ao") peninsula in southern Fujian.

== See also ==
- World turtle
