= Xu Fu =

Chinese alchemist and explorer

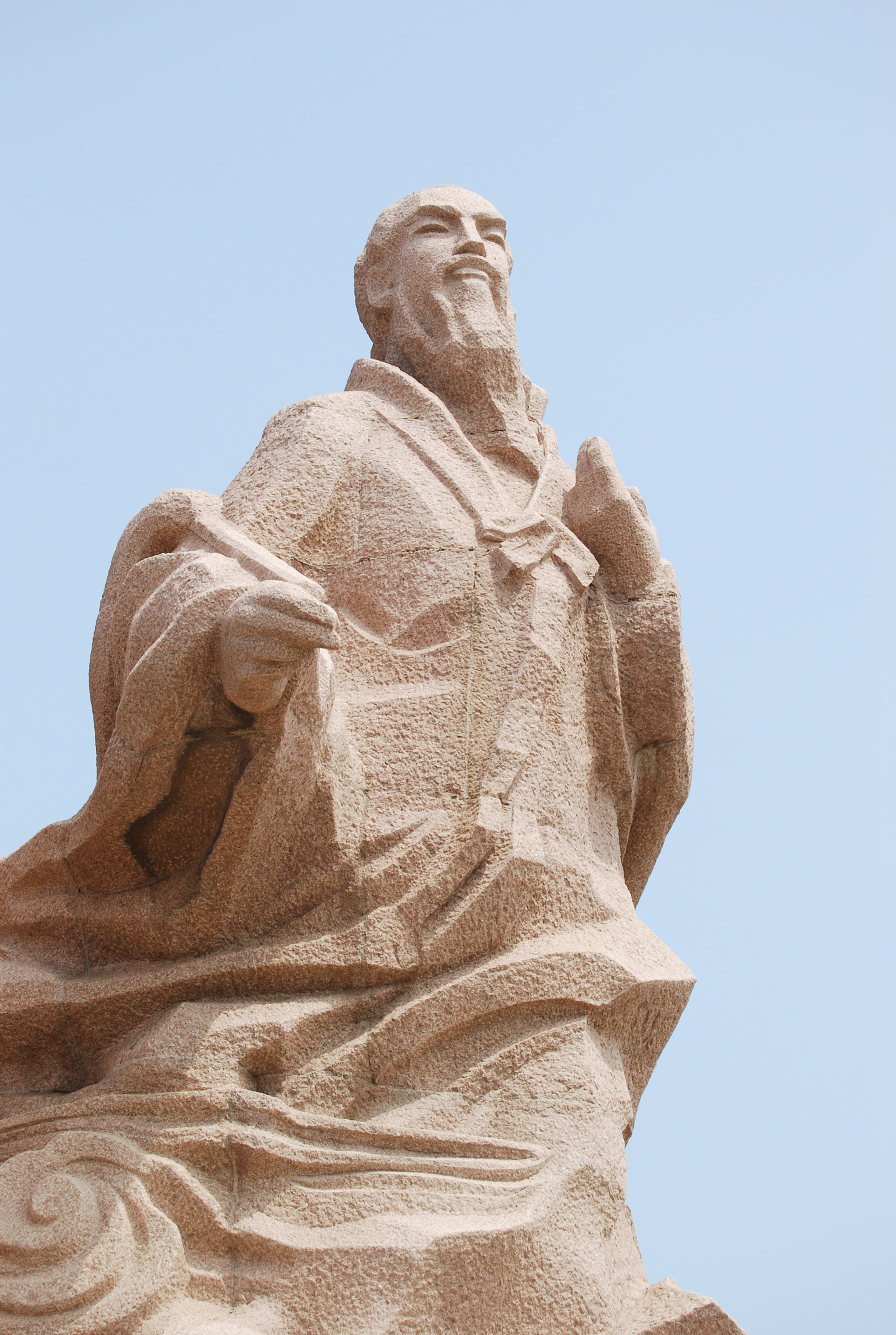
A statue of Xu Fu in Weihai, Shandong

Xu Fu (Hsu Fu; Chinese: 徐福 or 徐巿; pinyin: Xú Fú; Wade–Giles: Hsu^{2} Fu^{2}; Japanese: 徐福 Jo Fuku or 徐巿 Jo Futsu; Korean: 서복 Seo Bok or 서불 Seo Bul) was a legendary Chinese alchemist and explorer. He was born in 255 BC in Qi, an ancient Chinese state, and disappeared at sea in 210 BC. He served as a court sorcerer in Qin dynasty China. Later, he was sent by Qin Shi Huang to the eastern seas twice to look for the elixir of life. His two journeys occurred between 219 BC and 210 BC. It was said that the fleet included 60 barques with soldiers, ship crewmen, and 3,000 boys and 3,000 girls, and craftsmen of different fields. After he embarked on a second mission in 210 BC, he never returned.

== Voyage ==
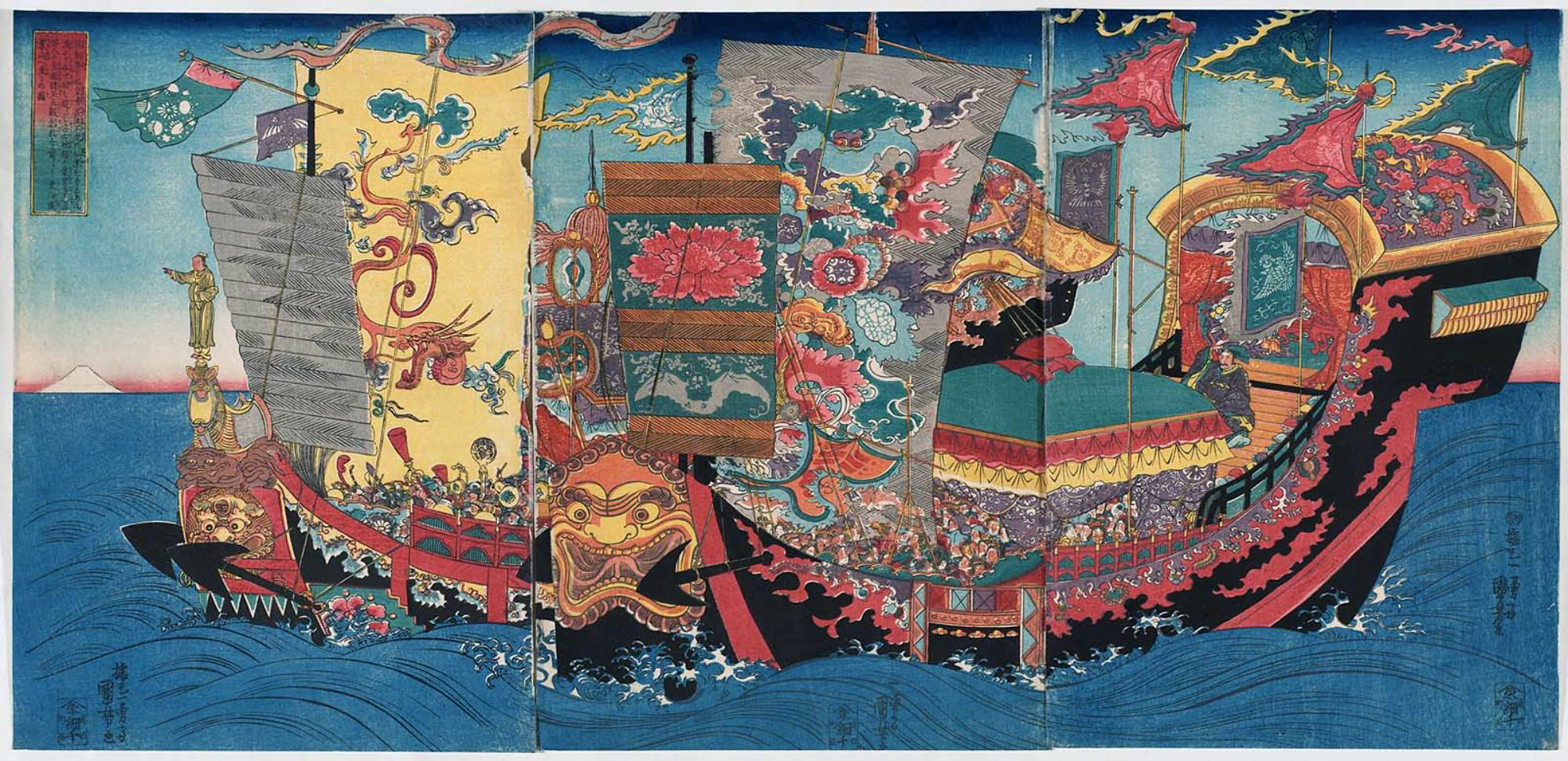
The expedition in search of the medicine for immortality.

The ruler of Qin dynasty, Qin Shi Huang, feared death and sought a way to live forever. He entrusted Xu Fu with the task of finding the secret elixir of immortality. In 219 BC, Xu Fu was sent with three thousand virgin boys and girls to retrieve the elixir of life from the immortals on Mount Penglai, including Anqi Sheng, who was purportedly a magician who was already a thousand years old. Xu sailed for several years without finding the mountain. In 210 BC, when Qin Shi Huang questioned him, Xu Fu claimed there was a giant sea creature blocking the path, and he asked for archers to kill the creature. Qin Shi Huang agreed, and sent archers to kill a giant fish. Xu then set sail again, but he never returned from this trip. The Records of the Grand Historian says he came to a place with "flat plains and wide swamps" (平原廣澤) and proclaimed himself king, never to return.

Later historical texts were also unclear on the location of Xu's final destination. Records of the Three Kingdoms and Book of the Later Han, and Guadi Zhi all state that he landed in "Danzhou" (亶州), but the whereabouts of Danzhou are unknown. Finally, more than 1,100 years after Xu Fu's final voyage, monk Yichu wrote during the Later Zhou (AD 951–960) of the Five Dynasties and Ten Kingdoms period that Xu Fu landed in Japan, and also said Xu Fu named Mount Fuji as Penglai. This is the "Legend of Xu Fu" in Japan as evidenced by the many memorials to him there.

== Legacy ==
Xu is said to have brought new farming techniques and knowledge that improved the quality of life of the ancient Japanese people and Xu Fu is said to have introduced many new plants and techniques to ancient Japan, although the texts are written much later. The local worship of Xu Fu as the "god of farming", "god of medicine" and "god of silk" by the Japanese is attributed to these achievements. Numerous temples and memorials of Xu can be found around Japan. In Xuzhou, there is a Xu Fu Research Institute attached to Xuzhou Teachers College.

Jofuku Park in Shingu, Wakayama Prefecture is dedicated to him.

=== Legacy in Japan ===
According to the tradition of Saga City, Saga Prefecture, when Xu Fu came to the Ariake Sea, he decided to float a cup in the water and go ashore where it made landfall. As such, the place where he is said to have landed is known as "Bubai", which literally means "floating cup".

Xu Fu is said to have reached the top of Mount Kinryu, where he met a hermit and obtained the elixir of immortal life. The elixir is said to have been made from a plant called furofuki, which still grows on Mount Kinryu today. The name "furofuki" is said to come from the word "furofushi", which means "not grow old, not die" in Japanese.

In October 2008, the Saga Xu Fu International Symposium was held in the city of Saga. Many researchers from Japan, mainland China, Taiwan, and South Korea participated and made presentations. A lecture was also given on the relationship with the Yoshinogari site.

== Historicity ==
Some modern scholars consider the legend of Xu Fu's settlement in Japan a historical possibility, while other scholars say the account has numerous inconsistencies and a lack of compelling evidence. Genetic research shows the Japanese people are an admixture of the indigenous Jōmon people and later migrants. The Jōmon originated from Southeast Asia and migrated to the Japanese archipelago around 14000 BC during the Paleolithic. The Yayoi people are thought to have migrated from Northeast Asia (likely from Korea) to Japan much later. The Yayoi period is generally accepted to date from around 300 BC to 300 AD. Highly controversial radiocarbon evidence may suggest a date up to 500 years earlier, between ca. 1000 BC and 800 BC.

== See also ==
- Emperor Jimmu
- Han Zhong (Daoist)
- Hata clan
