= Zheng Ji =

Zheng Ji may refer to:

- Zheng Ji (general) (died 49 BC), Protector General of the Western Regions during the Han dynasty
- Zheng Ji (biochemist) (1900–2010), Chinese biochemist and nutritionist

== See also ==
- Zheng Jie (disambiguation)
- Zhang Jie (disambiguation)
