= Zhang Jie (poet) =

Chinese poet (active circa 877)

Zhang Jie (章碣) was a Late Tang poet, active around the year 877. He was particularly noted for his use of experimental metre. He is now best known for "The Book-Burning Pit" (or "Pit of Burning Books"), a poem which alludes to how the First Emperor of China's destruction of books and scholars did nothing to prevent his dynasty's overthrow by illiterate rebels.
