= Chi Cheng =

Chi Cheng may refer to:

- Chi Cheng (athlete) (or Ji Zheng; born 1944), Taiwanese track and field athlete
- Chi Cheng (musician) (1970–2013), bassist for the Deftones
- Chi Cheng, a character in the TV series Revenged Love played by Tian Xu Ning

== See also ==
- Cheng Chi (1760–1802), or Zheng Qi, Chinese pirate
