= Liu'ao, Fujian =

Town in Fujian Province, China

Coordinates: 23.9371°N 117.7459°E

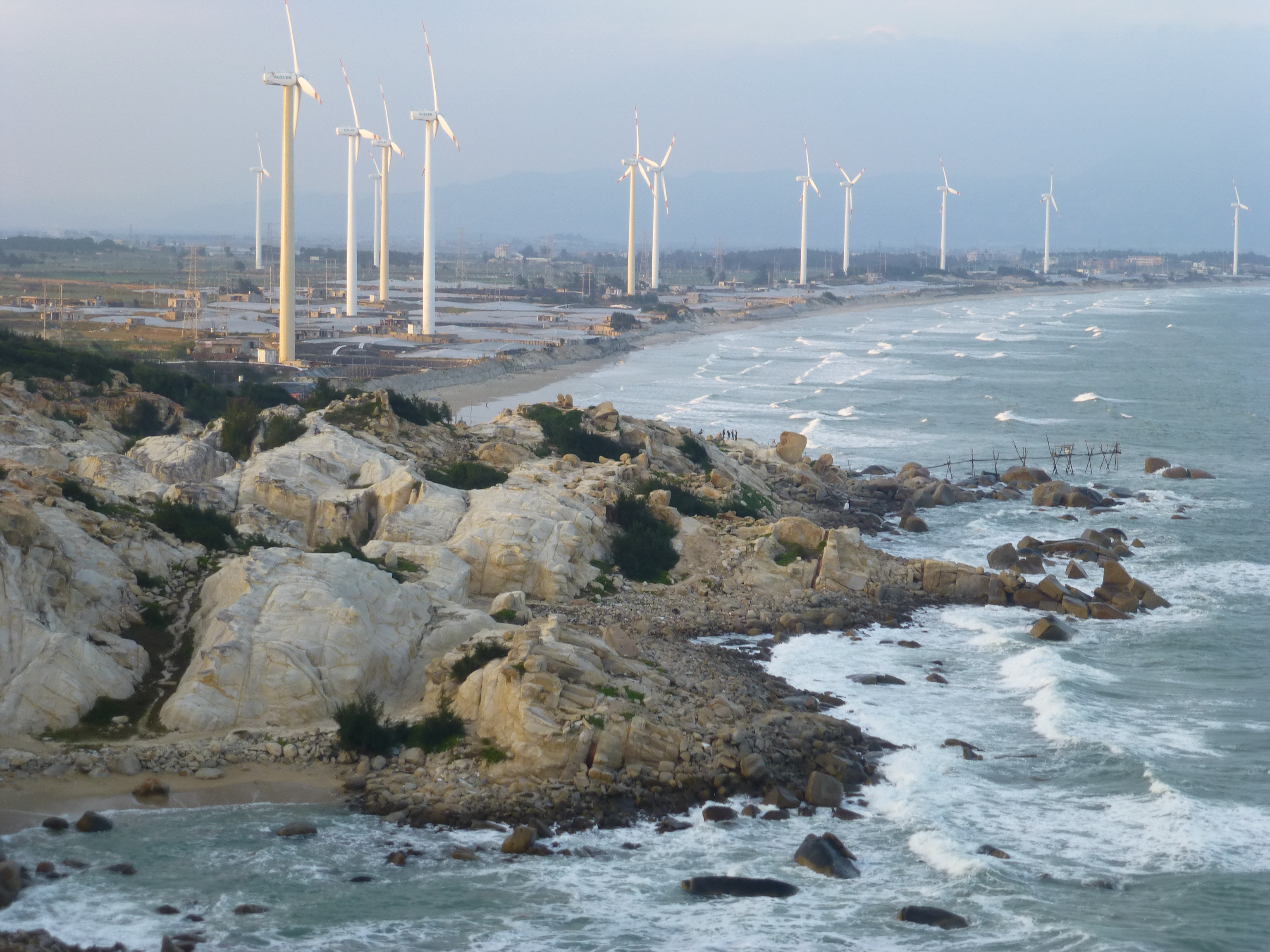
Wind power turbine towers in Liu'ao, near the "Abstract Art Gallery"

The Liu'ao Peninsula (simplified Chinese: 六鳌半岛; traditional Chinese: 六鰲半島; Pe̍h-ōe-jī: La̍k-gô Pòaⁿ-tó) is located in the southern part of China's Fujian Province's coast. Administratively, it is incorporated as Liu'ao Town (simplified Chinese: 六鳌镇; traditional Chinese: 六鰲鎮; Pe̍h-ōe-jī: La̍k-gô-tìn) within Fujian's Zhangpu County.

== Geography ==
Liu'ao Peninsula is about 12 km long, stretched along the north-south axis. In the north, it is connected to the mainland by a fairly narrow isthmus. Its western coast is separated from Fujian's mainland by the shallow Jiuzhen Bay; its eastern coast and southern coasts face the open sea (Taiwan Strait).

Most of the peninsula is flat and sandy. However, it also incorporates several rocky hills. It is the outlines of these hills which may have given the peninsula its name, which means "six ao".

== History ==
During the Hongwu Emperor reign, a fortress was constructed at the foot of one of the hills of the Liu'ao peninsula, a bit inland from the main business district of today's Liu'ao town. This was part of a concerted program to fight the wokou pirates; other fortresses built at the same time period include Chongwu (in Hui'an County) and Pucheng. While little remains of the old Liu'ao fortress, a section of its wall has been restored, and is preserved as a historic site called Liu'ao Old Walled Town (simplified Chinese: 六鳌古城; traditional Chinese: 六鰲古城; Pe̍h-ōe-jī: La̍k-gô Kó͘-siâⁿ).

== Economy ==
Historically, the peninsula's economy was based on fishing and farming. Root crops, such as sweet potatoes, onions, and radishes are grown widely in its sandy soil.

In the 21st century, a large number of wind turbine towers have been erected on the peninsula's windy west coast. Projects exist for constructing offshore wind towers as well.
