= Fanghu =

Mystical land in Chinese mythology

- Genre: Chinese mythology

In-universe information
- Other name: Fangzhang
- Type: Xianjing
- Races: Xian, loong

Fanghu
- Traditional Chinese: 方壺
- Simplified Chinese: 方壶
Transcriptions
Standard Mandarin
- Wade–Giles: F'ang^{2}-hu^{2}

Fanghu (simplified Chinese: 方壶; traditional Chinese: 方壺; pinyin: fānghú), also known as Fanghu Mountain or Fangzhang zhou (Chinese: 方丈州; pinyin: fāngzhàng zhoú), is one of the five Bohai Sea Shenshan mountain-islands in Taoist mythology. It is said this is where the Emperor Qin Shihuang visited to seek immortality.

== Legend of the Five Bohai Shenshan Mountains-Islands ==
In the Bohai Sea there is a place where all water sources flow called the Guixu Valley. In it were five sacred mountains - Penglai, Fanghu or Fangzhang, Yingzhou, Daiyu and Yuanjiao.

The mountains were inhabited by Taoist xian and beasts who flew from one mountain to another. The tops of the mountains were said 9000 li wide and 70,000 li apart from each other. Its flat terraces were said to be made of gold, jade, and onyx. Eating the fruits of the trees atop the mountains granted immortality and everlasting youth.

In order to make sure the mountains stayed stable for the xian, the ruler of the heavens ordered Yuqiang to command fifteen ao to stabilize the five mountains. The turtle is a legendary creature in Chinese mythology that is believed to have the power to cause earthquakes, as well as changes in the sea, mountains, and rivers. The fifteen ao were split into three groups who switched shifts once every 60,000 years. However, in the nearby Longbo Kingdom there lived giants whose strides were so large they could walk over to the mountains and fish six ao out. The Longbo giants burned the bones of the ao for oracle bone divination. As a result, the Daiyu and Yuanjiao mountains floated to the edge of the sea and sunk. Billions of xian were forced to evacuate their homes. As punishment, the heavenly emperor cursed the Longbo Kingdom to shrink in area over time, forcing its people to also shrink in size to adapt.。

According to Dongfang Shuo, Fanghu is where long dragons (龙) and xian (仙) who do not wish to ascend to the heavens lived. The xian there lived idyllic lives and the place is filled with acres of farms and fields tended by the xian.

== Qin Shihuang's search for immortality ==
The Emperor Qin Shihuang sent his envoys to seek an elixir for immortality on the three Pengbo Shenshan - Fanghu, Penglai, and Yingzhou.

Since at least the King Wei of Qi, rulers have repeatedly sent envoys to seek the three Shenshan in the Pengbo Sea. It's said that there, all the beasts are pure white and buildings are made of gold and silver. When approaching, the three Shenshan look like clouds. But upon getting closer, they disappear into the sea and the ships are blown away. For years, Qin Shihuang also sent envoys to seek the three Shenshan to find an elixir of youth. However, every envoy returned claiming they were blown away as soon as they got closer to the three Shenshan. Qin Shihuang spent five years sending envoys to look for Shenshan, and looked for it himself on expeditions near the Bohai Sea. He died in the fifth year before he was able to reach the islands.

== Fanghu in Chinese Gardens ==
The pursuit of immortality directly influenced the development of the Chinese garden in China. In order to get closer to the immortality, emperors dug pools in the garden to build islands, simulating the Bohai Shenshan mountains on the sea. The Jianzhang Palace in the Han Dynasty is the first known garden built with the complete set of the three remaining Bohai Shenshan mountains. Since then, the Yichi Sanshan (Chinese: 一池三山) system of one pond with three mountains has been a main model of royal gardens. The Fanghu Wonderland (Chinese: 方壶胜境) is one of the 40 Scenes in the Old Summer Palace.
