= Salix sinopurpurea =

Scientific classification
- Kingdom: Plantae
- Clade: Tracheophytes
- Clade: Angiosperms
- Clade: Eudicots
- Clade: Rosids
- Order: Malpighiales
- Family: Salicaceae
- Genus: Salix
- Species: S. sinopurpurea

Binomial name
- Salix sinopurpurea C.Wang & Chang Y.Yang

Species of plant

Salix sinopurpurea (Chinese: 红皮柳; pinyin: hong pi liu) is a species of willow native to central and southern China. It is the Chinese version of Salix purpurea.

== Description ==
Salix sinopurpurea is usually taller and larger than its European counterparts (Salix purpurea). The shrubs can grow up to 4 meters tall. The glabrous branchlets are greenish or yellowish in color. The terete catkins are opposite or alternate. The leaves are opposite or obliquely opposite. The flowering happens between April through May.
