= Yi Chung-hwan =

Korean geographer (1690–1756)

Yi Chung-hwan (Korean: 이중환; Hanja: 李重煥; 1690–1756) was a Joseon civil servant and geographer. He wrote the classic Taengniji (1751), describing places in Korea in detail, including provinces of Pyeong'an, Hamgyeong, Hwanghae, Gangwon, Gyeongsang, Jeolla, Chungcheong, and Gyeonggi.
