= List of books banned by governments =

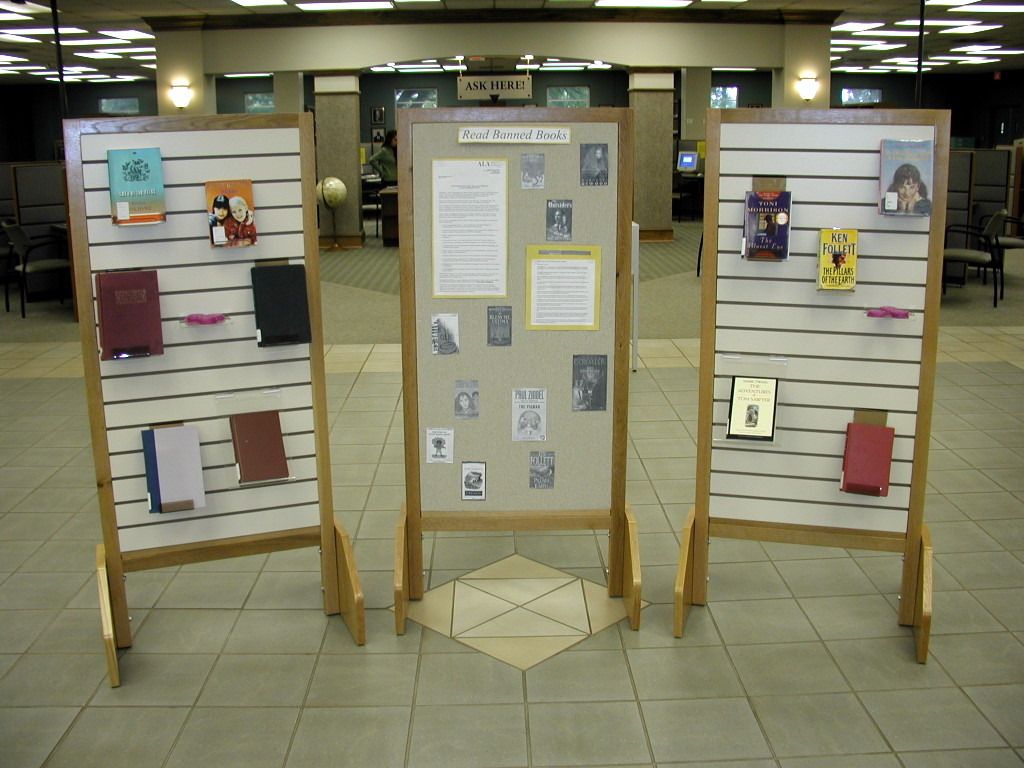
A display of formerly banned books at a US library

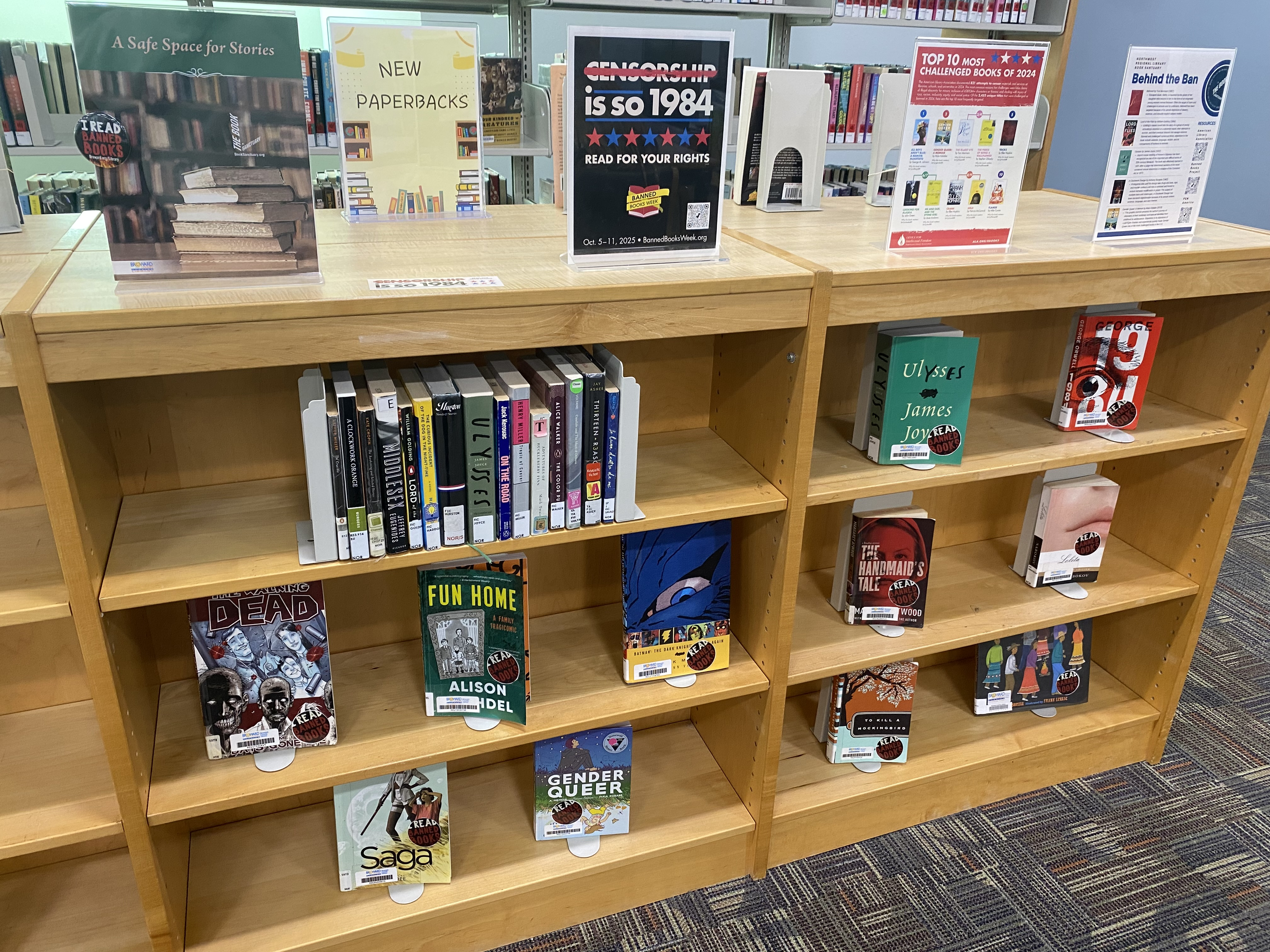
A banned books sanctuary in a Florida library

Banned books are books or other printed works such as essays or plays which have been prohibited by law, or to which free access has been restricted by other means. The practice of banning books is a form of censorship, from political, legal, religious, moral, or commercial motives. This article lists notable banned books and works, giving a brief context for the reason that each book was prohibited. Banned books include fictional works such as novels, poems and plays and non-fiction works such as biographies and dictionaries.

The usual reasons for banning books are pornography and obscenity, including child porn, anti-government or revolutionary provocation, propagating extremist philosophy such as Nazism, agitation of hate, instructions on violence, homicide or preparing illegal weapons and/or munitions, and/or blasphemy, especially in Islamic countries. Many books have been banned because of multiple reasons.

Since there have been a large number of banned books, some publishers have sought out to publish these books. The best-known examples are the Parisian Obelisk Press, which published Henry Miller's sexually frank novel Tropic of Cancer, and Olympia Press, which published William S. Burroughs's Naked Lunch. Both of these, the work of father Jack Kahane and son Maurice Girodias, specialized in English-language books which were prohibited, at the time, in Great Britain and the United States. Ruedo ibérico, also located in Paris, specialized in books prohibited in Spain during the dictatorship of Francisco Franco. Russian literature prohibited during the Soviet period was published outside of Russia.

Many countries throughout the world have their own methods of restricting access to books, although the prohibitions vary strikingly from one country to another. The following list of countries includes historical states that no longer exist.

== Albania ==
Title	Author(s)	Year published	Type	Notes
Përbindëshi (The Monster) (1965)	Ismail Kadare	1965–1990	Novel	Banned for 25 years in Albania.

== Argentina ==
Title	Author(s)	Year published	Type	Notes
Lolita	Vladimir Nabokov	1955	Novel	Was banned in the past for being "obscene".

== Australia ==
Title	Author(s)	Year published	Year banned	Year unbanned	Type	Notes
The Decameron	Giovanni Boccaccio	1353	1927	1936	Story collection	Banned in Australia from 1927 to 1936 and from 1938 to 1973.
The Decameron	Giovanni Boccaccio	1353	1938	1973	Story collection	Banned in Australia from 1927 to 1936 and from 1938 to 1973.
The 120 Days of Sodom (1789)	Marquis de Sade	1789	1957	*Unknown*	Novel	Banned by the Australian Government in 1957 for obscenity.
Droll Stories	Honoré de Balzac	1837	1901	1923	Short stories	Banned for obscenity from 1901 to 1923 and from 1928 to c. 1973.
Droll Stories	Honoré de Balzac	1837	1928	1973	Short stories	Banned for obscenity from 1901 to 1923 and from 1928 to c. 1973.
The Straits Impregnable	Sydney Loch	1916	1916	*Unknown*	Fictionalised autobiography	First edition published as a novel, second edition banned by the military censor in Australia under regulations of the War Precautions Act 1914.
Lady Chatterley's Lover (1928)	D. H. Lawrence	1928	1929	1965	Novel	Banned from 1929 to 1965.
Rowena Goes Too Far (1931)	H. C. Asterley	1931	*Unknown*	*Unknown*	Novel	Banned in Australia because of customs belief that it "lacked sufficient claim to the literary to excuse the obscenity"
Brave New World	Aldous Huxley	1932	1932	1937	Novel	Banned in Australia from 1932 to 1937.
The Cautious Amorist	Norman Lindsay	1932	1933	1953	Novel	Banned in Australia from 1933 to 1953.
Age of Consent	Norman Lindsay	1938		by 1939	Novel	Banned in Australia, briefly, in 1938.
Forever Amber (1944)	Kathleen Winsor	1944	1945	*Unknown*	Novel	Banned by Australia in 1945 as "a collection of bawdiness, amounting to sex obsession."
Borstal Boy	Brendan Behan	1958		*Unknown*	Autobiographical novel	Banned shortly after its ban in Ireland in 1958.
Another Country	James Baldwin	1962	1963	1966	Novel	Banned in Australia by the Commonwealth Customs Department in February 1963. The Literature Censorship Board described it as "continually smeared with indecent, offensive and dirty epithets and allusions," but recommended that the book remain available to "the serious minded student or reader." The ban was lifted in May 1966.
Ecstasy and Me	Hedy Lamarr	1966	1967	1973	Autobiography	Banned in Australia from 1967 to 1973.
The World Is Full of Married Men (1968)	Jackie Collins	1968		*Unknown*	Novel	Banned in Australia in 1968.
The Stud (1969)	Jackie Collins	1969		*Unknown*	Novel	Banned in Australia in 1969.
The Anarchist Cookbook	William Powell	1971	1985	Currently banned	Instructional	The book was refused classification in 1985 thus making it banned in Australia under the National Classification Code Table 1.(c) for publications that could "promote, incite or instruct in matters of crime or violence"
How to make disposable silencers (1984)	Desert and Eliezer Flores	1984	*Unknown*	*Unknown*	Instructional	An example of a class of books banned in Australia that "promote, incite or instruct in matters of crime or violence".
American Psycho	Bret Easton Ellis	1991		1992 (ages 18+) *Unknown* (younger than 18)	Novel	Sale and purchase was banned in the Australian state of Queensland. Now available in public libraries and for sale to people 18 years and older. Sale restricted to persons at least 18 years old in the other Australian states.
A Sneaking Suspicion (1995)	John Dickson	1995	2015		Religious text	Banned by the New South Wales Department of Education and Communities from state schools on May 6, 2015, on the basis of a "potential risk to students in the delivery of this material, if not taught sensitively and in an age appropriate manner." The ban was lifted May 18, 2015.
The Peaceful Pill Handbook (2007)	Philip Nitschke and Fiona Stewart	2007			Instructional manual on euthanasia	The book was initially restricted in Australia; after review, the 2007 edition was banned outright.
You: An Introduction (2008)	Michael Jensen	2008	2015		Religious text	Banned by the New South Wales Department of Education and Communities from state schools on May 6, 2015, on the basis of a "potential risk to students in the delivery of this material, if not taught sensitively and in an age appropriate manner." The ban was lifted May 18, 2015.
No Game No Life (Volumes 1, 2, 9)	Yuu Kamiya	2012–2016	2020	*Unknown*	Novel	Light novel volumes banned in Australia due to their depiction, "in a way that is likely to cause offence to a reasonable adult, [of] a person who is, or appears to be, a child under 18".

== Austria ==
Title	Author(s)	Year published	Year banned	Year unbanned	Type	Notes
The Sorrows of Young Werther	Johann Wolfgang von Goethe	1774	*Unknown*	*Unknown*	Novel	Banned by the authorities in the Austrian territories ruled by the Habsburg monarchy.
Works	Karl Marx	1841–1883	1938	1945	Non‑fiction	All of Marx's works were banned in Austria after the country was annexed by Nazi Germany.
Works	Albert Einstein	1901–1938	1938	1945	Non‑fiction	All of Einstein's works published up to 1938 were banned in Austria, after it was annexed by Nazi Germany.
Mein Kampf (1925)	Adolf Hitler	1925	1947		Political manifesto	In Austria, the Verbotsgesetz 1947 prohibits the printing of the book. It is illegal to own or distribute existing copies. Following the general prohibition of advocating the Nazi Party or its aims in § 3 and of re-founding Nazi organizations in § 1, § 3 d. of the Verbotsgesetz states: "Whoever publicly or before several people, in printed works, disseminated texts or illustrations requests, encourages or seeks to induce others to commit any of the acts prohibited under § 1 or § 3, especially if for this purpose he glorifies or advertises the aims of the Nazi Party, its institutions or its actions, provided that it does not constitute a more serious criminal offense, will be punished with imprisonment from five to ten years, or up to twenty years if the offender or his actions are especially dangerous."

== Bangladesh ==
Title	Author(s)	Year published	Type	Notes
Amar Fashi Chai (1999)	Motiur Rahman Rentu	1999	Political	The book, set in the political and social context of Bangladesh, was banned by the then–Prime Minister of Bangladesh, Sheikh Hasina. The book describes various aspects of Sheikh Hasina's character.
Rangila Rasul (1927)	Pandit M. A. Chamupati	1927	Religious	Currently banned in India, Pakistan, and Bangladesh.
The Satanic Verses (1988)	Salman Rushdie	1988	Novel	Banned for blasphemy against Islam. Rushdie received a fatwa for his alleged blasphemy.
Naree (1992)	Humayun Azad	1992	Criticism	Banned in Bangladesh in 1995, though the ban was later lifted in 2000.
Lajja (1993)	Taslima Nasrin	1993	Novel	Banned in Bangladesh, and a few states of India. Other books by her were also banned in Bangladesh or in the Indian state of West Bengal. Amar Meyebela (My Girlhood, 2002), the first volume of her memoir, was banned by the Bangladeshi government in 1999 for "reckless comments" against Islam and the prophet Mohammad. Utal Hawa (Wild Wind), the second part of her memoir, was banned by the Bangladesh government in 2002. Ka (Speak up), the third part of her memoir, was banned by the Bangladeshi High Court in 2003. Under pressure from Indian Muslim activists, the book, which was published in West Bengal as Dwikhandita, was banned there also; some 3,000 copies were seized immediately. The decision to ban the book was criticised by "a host of authors" in West Bengal, but the ban was not lifted until 2005. Sei Sob Ondhokar (Those Dark Days), the fourth part of her memoir, was banned by the Bangladesh government in 2004.

== Belgium ==
Title	Author(s)	Year published	Type	Notes
Uitgeverij Guggenheimer ("Guggenheimer Publishers") (1999)	Herman Brusselmans	1999	Novel	Banned in Belgium because this satirical novel offended fashion designer Ann Demeulemeester by making derogatory remarks about her personal looks and profession. A court decided the book was an insult to the individual's private life and ordered it to be removed from the stores.

== Bosnia and Herzegovina ==
Title	Author(s)	Year published	Type	Notes
The Mountain Wreath (1847)	Petar II Petrović-Njegoš	1847	Drama in verse	Banned in Bosnian schools by Carlos Westendorp.

== Brazil ==
Title	Author(s)	Year published	Type	Notes
Happy New Year (1975)	Rubem Fonseca	1975	Short stories	Banned in Brazil during the military dictatorship by order of the then Minister of Justice, Armando Falcão, under the accusation of "attacking morality and good habits". The author of the book, Rubem Fonseca, filed a lawsuit against the Brazilian government. In 1980, the case was tried for the first time and the judge upheld the ban, claiming that the work incited violence. The ban was lifted in 1985, with the end of the military dictatorship, but the book only received a new edition in 1989, when Fonseca appealed and won the case in court.

== Canada ==
Title	Author(s)	Year published	Type	Notes
Droll Stories	Honoré de Balzac	1837	Short stories	Banned for obscenity in 1914.
Lady Chatterley's Lover	D. H. Lawrence	1928	Novel	The unexpurgated United States edition was allowed to be imported by McClelland & Stewart in 1959. The book's status as an obscene publication was not resolved until a ruling by the Supreme Court of Canada in 1962.
By Grand Central Station I Sat Down and Wept	Elizabeth Smart	1945	Autobiographical prose poetry	Banned in Canada from 1945 to 1975 under the influence of Smart's family's political power due to its sexual documentation of Smart's affair with a married man.
The Naked and the Dead (1948)	Norman Mailer	1948	Novel	Banned in Canada in 1949 for "obscenity".
Lolita (1955)	Vladimir Nabokov	1955	Novel	Banned in Canada in 1956. The ban was not enforced on imports of the Putnam edition from the United States and was lifted in late 1958.
Peyton Place (1956)	Grace Metalious	1956	Novel	Banned in Canada from 1956 to 1958.
How to Kill (series)	John Minnery	1973	Instructional	Banned in Canada in 1977.
The Hoax of the Twentieth Century	Arthur Butz	1976	Non-fiction	Classified as "hate literature" in Canada with the Royal Canadian Mounted Police destroying copies as recently as 1995.
The Turner Diaries	William Luther Pierce	1978	Novel	Classified as "hate literature" in Canada and subsequently banned from import into the country.
Lethal Marriage	Nick Pron	1995	True crime	Written by a newspaper reporter about the Paul Bernardo and Karla Homolka case, this book allegedly contains inaccuracies, additionally, complaints were received by the St. Catharines library board from the mother of a victim that led to the book being removed from all public library branches in the city. As recently as 1999, this book was still unavailable to public library patrons in St. Catharines.
Lost Girls	Alan Moore and Melinda Gebbie	2006	Graphic novel	Importation was initially prohibited on publication in 2006. The prohibition was overturned in October 2006 after a formal appeal by the publisher to the Canada Border Services Agency determined the book was not legally obscene.

== Chile ==
Title	Author(s)	Year published	Type	Notes
How to Read Donald Duck	Ariel Dorfman and Armand Mattelart	1971	Non‑fiction	Banned in Pinochet's Chile. The Chilean army publicly burned copies of the book.
The House of the Spirits	Isabel Allende	1982	Novel	Banned in Pinochet's Chile.
The Open Veins of Latin America	Eduardo Galeano	1971	Non‑fiction	
Clandestine in Chile	Gabriel García Márquez	1986	Non‑fiction	Banned in Pinochet's Chile. On November 28, 1986, the Chilean customs authorities seized almost 15,000 copies of Clandestine in Chile, which were later burned by military authorities in Valparaíso.

== China ==
Title	Author	Type	Notes
Jane Eyre (1847)	Amy Corzine and Charlotte Brontë	Novel	Jane Eyre was censored because the CCP deemed it socially corrupting to the youth of China during the Cultural Revolution.
Alice's Adventures in Wonderland (1865)	Lewis Carroll	Children's Novel/Adventure	Alice's Adventures in Wonderland was banned in the province of Hunan, China by the KMT's government, beginning in 1931, due to its portrayal of anthropomorphized animals which act with the same level of complexity as human beings. The censor General Ho Chien believed that attributing human language to animals was an insult to humans. He feared that the book would teach children to believe that humans and animals were on the same level, a result which would be "disastrous."
Various works	Shen Congwen	Novels	"Denounced by the Communists and Nationalists alike, Mr. Shen saw his writings banned in Taiwan, while mainland [China] publishing houses burned his books and destroyed printing plates for his novels. .... So successful was the effort to erase Mr. Shen's name from the modern literary record that few younger Chinese today recognize his name, much less the breadth of his work. Only since 1978 has the Chinese Government reissued selections of his writings, although in editions of only a few thousand copies. .... In China, his passing was unreported."
Life and Death in Shanghai (1986)	Nien Cheng	Autobiography	It is about the author's personal tortured experience during the Cultural Revolution.
Soul Mountain (1989)	Gao Xingjian	Novel	Gao Xingjian won the 2000 Nobel Prize in Literature for the book, however all of his works have been banned for having content critical of the CCP.
White Snow, Red Blood (1989)	Zhang Zhenglong	Non-fiction novel	Banned in 1990, and both the author and publishers were imprisoned for publishing it. The book includes information about atrocities committed by the Red Army during the siege of Changchun, the smuggling of opium by senior Party leader Wang Zhen during the Chinese Civil War, and claims that China's official description of the Lin Biao affair is inaccurate.
Wild Swans: Three Daughters of China (1991)	Jung Chang	Family history	It talked about brutal political upheavals in China and purges of the Cultural Revolution.
Yellow Peril (1991)	Wang Lixiong	Novel	Banned. The book contains episodes of a fictional collapse of Chinese communist rule.
Zhuan Falun (1993)	Li Hongzhi	Spiritual/Political	Banned in mainland China.
The Private Life of Chairman Mao (1994)	Li Zhisui	Memoir	Banned for exploring Mao's private life.
One Man's Bible (1999)	Gao Xingjian	Novel	All of Gao Xingjian's works have been banned for having content critical of the CCP.
How the Red Sun Rose: The Origins and Development of the Yan'an Rectification Movement, 1930-1945 (2000)	Gao Hua	History	Banned for exploring in detail Mao Zedong in the Yan'an Rectification and the internal struggles of the CCP.
Shanghai Baby (2001)	Wei Hui	Semi-autobiographical novel	Banned. Burned in the street and the publisher was shut down for three months because of its sexual and drug-related content, which has been accused of being "immoral" by the government. Other writers have accused the book of plagiarism.
The Tiananmen Papers (2001)	Compiled by Zhang Liang	Compilation of selected Chinese official documents	Controversy about this book include authenticity of selected documents and selection bias.
Candy (2003)	Mian Mian	Novel	Chinese government censored it because it was "a poster child for spiritual pollution".
Death Note (2003 – 2006)	Tsugumi Ohba	Japanese Manga	Officially banned, but discussion and pirated copies are allowed to circulate.
Zhou Enlai: The Last Perfect Revolutionary (2003 or 2008)	Gao Wenqian	Biography	Banned in China.
Buying a Fishing Rod for My Grandfather (2004)	Gao Xingjian	Short story collections	All of Gao Xingjian's works have been banned for having content critical of the CCP.
I Love My Mum (2004)	Chen Xiwo	Political	A novella in which the relationship between Chinese citizens and their government are metaphorically portrayed as a cognitively impaired man in extreme sexual situations with their mother.
Will the Boat Sink the Water (2004)	Chen Guidi and Wu Chuntao	Academic study	Banned for exploring peasant protests. Sold an estimated 7 million pirated copies, despite being almost immediately banned by China's propaganda department.
Mao: The Unknown Story (2005)	Jung Chang and Jon Halliday	Political	Banned due to depicting Chairman Mao Zedong as a fascist leader against his people. Book reviews have also been banned.
Lingren Wangshi (2005)	Zhang Yihe	Non-fiction	The book, which documents the experiences of Peking Opera artists during the Anti-Rightist Campaign and the Cultural Revolution, was banned by the General Administration of Press and Publication in 2007.
Dream of Ding Village (2006)	Yan Lianke	Novel	Banned for discussing AIDS in rural China (Plasma Economy), the ban had reportedly been lifted.
Highschool of the Dead (2006 – 2013)	Daisuke Satō and Shōji Satō	Japanese Manga	Banned for the purpose of protecting "the healthy development of youth".
Serve the People! (2008)	Yan Lianke	Novel	Banned for "slandering Mao Zedong", and depicting images of sex.
Tombstone: The Great Chinese Famine, 1958-1962 (2008)	Yang Jisheng	History	Published in Hong Kong, banned for discussing the Great Chinese Famine.
Attack on Titan (2009 – 2021)	Hajime Isayama	Japanese Manga	Banned for the purpose of protecting "the healthy development of youth".
Big River, Big Sea — Untold Stories of 1949 (2009)	Lung Ying-tai	Non-Fiction	It sold over 100,000 copies in Taiwan and 10,000 in Hong Kong in its first month of release, but discussion of her work was banned in mainland China following the book launch.
Prisoner of the State (2009)	Zhao Ziyang	Memoir	Banned. The book is memoirs by former Chinese General Secretary Zhao Ziyang.
China's Best Actor: Wen Jiabao (2010)	Yu Jie	Political	Published in Hong Kong and banned in mainland China. Author moved to the United States in 2012.
Tokyo Ghoul (2011 – 2014)	Sui Ishida	Japanese Manga	Banned for containing violent and indecent criminal scenes.
Bloody Myth: An Account of the Cultural Revolution Massacre of 1967 in Daoxian, Hunan (血的神话: 公元1967年湖南道县文革大屠杀纪实) (2012)	Tan Hecheng	Non-fiction	An account of murders in a rural district of China during Mao Zedong's Cultural Revolution. Banned for 26 years and released in 2012.
Reverend Insanity (2012–2019)	Gu Zhen Ren	Web novel / Xianxia	Removed from major Chinese online platforms following a government ban in mainland China, as the work was deemed to promote unhealthy values of violence, cruelty, and extreme individualism.
Moving Away from the Imperial Regime (2015)	Qin Hui	Political	Banned. The book explores the unfulfilled promise of constitutional democracy, and another historian suggests that it may have been banned because the topic deals with the Chinese dynastic cycle.
Capital and Ideology (2019)	Thomas Piketty	Economy	Banned for discussing China's income inequality and for refusing to accept censorship for a planned translation.
Unfree Speech: The Threat to Global Democracy and Why We Must Act, Now (2020)	Joshua Wong	Political	Censored due to inciting secession. Taken out of libraries because of the Hong Kong national security law.
The Chongzhen Emperor: Diligent Ruler of a Failed Dynasty (2023)	Chen Wutong	History	Censored due to popular comparisons between the final emperor of the Ming dynasty, the Chongzhen Emperor, and Xi Jinping.

== Czechoslovakia ==
Title	Author	Year published	Year banned	Year unbanned	Type	Notes
The White Disease (1937)	Karel Čapek	1937	1938	1945	Political play	Banned by the government of the Second Czechoslovak Republic in 1938.
Animal Farm (1945)	George Orwell	1946	1948	1968	Political novella	Banned by the government in 1948.

== Egypt ==
Title	Author(s)	Year published	Type	Notes
A Feast for the Seaweeds (Walimah li A'ashab al‑Bahr)	Haidar Haidar	1983	Novel	Banned in Egypt and several other Arab states, and even resulted in a belated angry reaction from the clerics of Al-Azhar University upon reprinting in Egypt in the year 2000. The clerics issued a fatwa banning the novel, and accused Haidar of heresy and offending Islam. Al-Azhar University students staged huge protests against the novel, that eventually led to its confiscation.
The Satanic Verses (1988)	Salman Rushdie	1988	Novel	Banned for blasphemy against Islam.

== El Salvador ==
Title	Author(s)	Year published	Type	Notes
One Day of Life (1980)	Manlio Argueta	1980	Novel	Banned by El Salvador for its portrayal of human rights violations.

== Eritrea ==
Title	Author(s)	Year published	Type	Notes
I Didn't Do It for You: How the World Betrayed a Small African Nation (2005)	Michela Wrong	2005	History	Banned in Eritrea in 2014 for its criticism of President Isaias Afewerki.
My Father's Daughter (2005)	Hannah Pool	2005	Biography	Banned in Eritrea in 2014 for political content.
Scouting for the Reaper (2014)	Jacob M. Appel	2014	Fiction	Banned in Eritrea in 2014 for its criticism of civil liberties under President Isaias Afewerki.

== France ==
Title	Author(s)	Year published	Type	Notes
Les Mœurs	François-Vincent Toussaint		Book	Officially banned in France in 1748.
Lolita (1955)	Vladimir Nabokov	1955	Novel	The novel was banned by French officials for being "obscene" from its publishing in 1955 until 1958, when it became legal to sell but not to exhibit.
Suicide mode d'emploi (1982)	Claude Guillon	1982	Instructional	This book, reviewing recipes for committing suicide, was the cause of a scandal in France in the 1980s, resulting in the enactment of a law prohibiting provocation to commit suicide and propaganda or advertisement of products, objects, or methods for committing suicide. Subsequent reprints were thus illegal. The book was cited by name in the debates of the French National Assembly when examining the bill.

== Germany ==
=== Weimar Republic (1918–1933) ===
Title	Author(s)	Year published	Type	Notes
Berlin Garden of Erotic Delights	Erwin von Busse under the pseudonym "Granand"	1920	Short story collection	Banned for "indecency" by courts in Berlin and Leipzig

=== Nazi Germany (1933–1945) ===
Title	Author(s)	Year published	Type	Notes
Ivanhoe	Walter Scott	1819	Novel	Prohibited by Nazi Germany for featuring Jewish characters.
Oliver Twist	Charles Dickens	1839	Novel	Prohibited by Nazi Germany for featuring Jewish characters.
The Communist Manifesto	Karl Marx and Friedrich Engels	1848	Political Manifesto	Prohibited by several countries, including Nazi Germany.
Works	Stefan Zweig	1900–1933	Plays, Novels, Non-fiction	All of Zweig's books published up to 1933 were banned by the Nazis in that same year.
Works	Sigmund Freud	1901–1933	Non-fiction	All of Freud's books published up to 1933 were banned by the Nazis in that same year.
The Iron Heel	Jack London	1908	Novel	Banned by the Nazis along with two other London novels, Martin Eden and The Jacket.
Works	Bertolt Brecht	1918–1933	Plays, Novels, Poetry, Non-fiction	All of Brecht's books published up to 1933 were banned by the Nazis in that same year.
The Outline of History	H. G. Wells	1920	Non-fiction	Wells' book was banned in Nazi Germany.
The World of William Clissold	H. G. Wells	1926	Novel	Banned in Nazi Germany in 1936. A further note to the banning order added that "all other works by the author" were to be suppressed.
All Quiet on the Western Front	Erich Maria Remarque	1929	Anti-war novel	Banned in Nazi Germany for being demoralizing and insulting to the Wehrmacht.
Die Gesteinigten	Friedrich Forster	1933	Drama	Banned and printed copies pulped.
The Story of Ferdinand	Munro Leaf	1936	Children's fiction	Banned in Nazi Germany.

=== East Germany (1949–1990) ===
Title	Author(s)	Year published	Type	Notes
The Jungle	Upton Sinclair	1906	Novel	In 1956, it was banned in East Germany for its incompatibility with Communism.

=== West Germany (1949–1990) and Germany (1990–present) ===
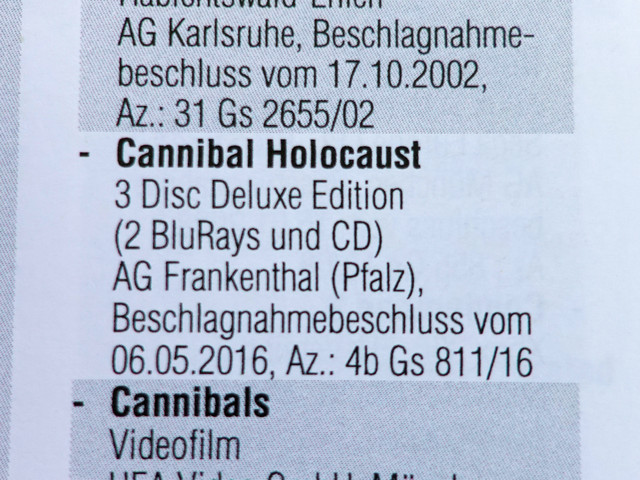
An exemplary entry of a movie in the list of confiscated media in the official magazine "BPjMaktuell" (today "BzKJaktuell").

In today's Germany, a book is considered banned if it has been confiscated by a court. The distribution of a confiscated book is prohibited, but private possession and reading is still legal (with the exception of child and youth pornographic material, where possession is already a criminal offense).

The official list of confiscated books was published by the Federal Department for Media Harmful to Young Persons (Bundeszentrale für Kinder- und Jugendmedienschutz) in the magazine "BzKJaktuell" until the beginning of 2022.

The list of confiscated books should not be confused with books on the "List of Media Harmful to Young Persons" (colloquially known as the "Index"). Books indexed by the Federal Department for Media Harmful to Young Persons are subject to strict restrictions and may only be offered and sold to adults.

==== List of books confiscated for violating Criminal Code 86, 86a, 130 or 130a ====
This list collectively lists media that violate one of the following paragraphs:

- Section 86: Dissemination of propaganda material of unconstitutional and terrorist organisations
- Section 86a: Use of symbols of unconstitutional and terrorist organisations
- Section 130: Incitement of masses
- Section 130a: Instructions for committing criminal offences

Title	Author(s)	Year published	Type	Notes
Auschwitz - Die Erste Vergasung - Gerüchte und Wirklichkeit	Carlo Mattogno	2007	Historical revisionism / Holocaust denial	Confiscated by the Mannheim Regional Court in September 2012. Unofficial title translation: Auschwitz, The First Gassing, Rumors and Reality
Auschwitz - Tätergeständnisse und Augenzeugen des Holocaust	Jürgen Graf	1994	Historical revisionism / Holocaust denial	Confiscated by the Mannheim Regional Court in November 1994. Unofficial title translation: Auschwitz - Confessions of Perpetrators and Eyewitnesses of the Holocaust
Der Auschwitz-Mythos - Legende oder Wirklichkeit	Wilhelm Stäglich	1978	Historical revisionism / Holocaust denial	Confiscated by the Stuttgart Regional Court in May 1982. Unofficial title translation: The Auschwitz Myth - Legend or Reality
Balisong - The Lethal Art of Filipino Knife Fighting	Sid Cambell, Gary Cagaanan, Sonny Umpad, published by Paladin Press	1986	Instructional	Confiscated by the Munich Regional Court in May 1991.
Black Book Companion - State-of-the Art Improvised Munitions	Published by Paladin Press	1990	Instructional	Confiscated by the Munich Regional Court in July 1991.
Die Chemie von Auschwitz - Die Technologie und Toxikologie von Zyklon B und den Gaskammern - Eine Tatortuntersuchung	Germar Rudolf	2017	Historical revisionism / Holocaust denial	Confiscated by the Darmstadt Regional Court in March 2018. Unofficial title translation: The Chemistry of Auschwitz - The Technology and Toxicology of Zyklon B and the Gas Chambers - A Crime Scene Investigation
Cold Steel - Technique of Close Combat	John Styres, published by Paladin Press	1952	Instructional	Confiscated by the Munich Regional Court in May 1991.
Deathtrap! Improvised Booby-Trap Devices	Jo Jo Gonzales, published by Paladin Press	1989	Instructional	Confiscated by the Munich Regional Court in July 1991.
Dragons Touch - Weaknesses of the Human Anatomy	Master Hei Long, published by Paladin Press	1983	Instructional	Confiscated by the Munich Regional Court in May 1991.
Endzeiten, Endspiele. Der Ausklang des jüdischen Jahrhunderts	Hans Schmidt	2000	Historical revisionism / Holocaust denial	Confiscated by the Kassel Regional Court in December 2000. Unofficial title translation: End times, end games. The conclusion of the Jewish century
Geheimakte Gestapo-Müller - Dokumente und Zeugnisse aus den US-Geheimarchiven (Band 1)	Gregory Douglas	1995	Historical revisionism / Holocaust denial	Confiscated by the Starnberg Regional Court in August 1996. Unofficial title translation: Secret Files Gestapo Müller - Documents and Evidence from the US Secret Archives
Geheimakte Gestapo-Müller - Dokumente und Zeugnisse aus den US-Geheimarchiven (Band 2)	Gregory Douglas	1996	Historical revisionism / Holocaust denial	Confiscated by the Starnberg Regional Court in January 1999. Unofficial title translation: Secret Files Gestapo Müller - Documents and Evidence from the US Secret Archives
Get Tough! How to Win in Hand-to-Hand Fighting	William E. Fairbairn, published by Paladin Press	1942	Instructional	Confiscated by the Munich Regional Court in July 1991.
Grundlagen zur Zeitgeschichte - Ein Handbuch über strittige Fragen des 20. Jahrhunderts	Germar Rudolf (as Ernst Gauss)	1994	Historical revisionism / Holocaust denial	Confiscated by the Tübingen Regional Court in March 1999. Unofficial title translation: Fundamentals of Contemporary History - A Handbook on Controversial Issues of the 20th Century
Der Holocaust auf dem Prüfstand - Augenzeugenberichte versus Naturgesetze	Jürgen Graf	1992	Historical revisionism / Holocaust denial	Confiscated by the Weinheim Regional Court in September 1993. Unofficial title translation: The Holocaust under scrutiny - eyewitness accounts versus natural laws
Der Holocaust-Schwindel	Jürgen Graf	1993	Historical revisionism / Holocaust denial	Confiscated by the Weinheim Regional Court in September 1993. Unofficial title translation: The Holocaust Hoax
Home Workshop Explosives	Uncle Fester, published by Loompanics Unlimited	1990	Instructional	Confiscated by the Munich Regional Court in July 1991.
Homemade Guns and Homemade Ammo	Ronald B. Brown, published by Loompanics Unlimited	1986	Instructional	Confiscated by the Munich Regional Court in July 1991.
Kardinalfragen zur Zeitgeschichte - Eine Sammlung kontroverser Stellungnahmen von Germar Rudolf alias Ernst Gauss zum herrschenden Zeitgeist in Wissenschaft, Politik, Justiz und Medien	Germar Rudolf (as Ernst Gauss)	1996	Historical revisionism / Holocaust denial	Confiscated by the Weilheim Regional Court in March 1998. Unofficial title translation: Cardinal Questions on Contemporary History - A collection of controversial statements by Germar Rudolf, alias Ernst Gauss, on the prevailing zeitgeist in science, politics, justice, and the media.
Mein Kampf	Adolf Hitler	1925	Political manifesto	In Germany, the copyright of the book was held by the State Government of Bavaria, and the Bavarian authorities prevented any reprinting from 1945 onward. This did not affect existing copies, which were available as vintage books. In 2016, following the expiration of the copyright, Mein Kampf was republished in Germany for the first time since 1945 as a commented edition by the Institut für Zeitgeschichte. An uncommented reprint was confiscated by the Forchheim Regional Court in October 2016 for Incitement of masses. Annotated editions are not affected by the confiscation.
The Poisoner's Handbook	Maxwell Hutchkinson, published by Loompanics Unlimited	1988	Instructional	Confiscated by the Munich Regional Court in May 1991.
Silent Death	Uncle Fester, published by Loompanics Unlimited	1989	Instructional	Confiscated by the Munich Regional Court in May 1991.
Todesursache Zeitgeschichtsforschung	Jürgen Graf	1995	Historical revisionism / Holocaust denial	Confiscated by the Mannheim Regional Court in January 1996. Unofficial title translation: Cause of death: Contemporary history research
Vorlesungen über den Holocaust - Strittige Fragen im Kreuzverhör	Germar Rudolf	2005	Historical revisionism / Holocaust denial	Confiscated by the Mannheim Regional Court in March 2007. Unofficial title translation: Lectures on the Holocaust - Controversial Questions in Cross-Examination
Wahrheit sagen, Teufel jagen	Gerard Menuhin	2016	Historical revisionism / Holocaust denial	Confiscated by the Schleswig Regional Court in February 2019. Unofficial title translation: Wahrheit sagen, Teufel jagen

==== List of books confiscated for violating Criminal Code 131 ====
This list contains media that violate the following paragraph:

- Section 131: Depictions of violence

Title	Author(s)	Year published	Type	Notes
Deep Wet Torture Handbook - Die 100 besten Frauenfolterfilme	Andreas Bethmann	2003	Catalog	Confiscated by the Neuburg an der Donau Regional Court in May 2007. Unofficial title translation: Deep Wet Torture Handbook - The 100 Best Female Torture Films

== Greece ==
Title	Author(s)	Year published	Type	Notes
Lysistrata (411 BC)	Aristophanes		Play	Banned in 1967 in Greece because of its anti-war message.

== Guatemala ==
Title	Author(s)	Year published	Type	Notes
Mein Kampf (1925)	Adolf Hitler	1925	Political manifesto	Banned during the regime of Jorge Ubico along with anti‑Hitler writings such as by those of Hermann Rauschning in order to encourage political neutrality in WWII.
El Señor Presidente	Miguel Ángel Asturias	1946	Novel	Banned in Guatemala because it went against the ruling political leaders.

== India ==
Title	Author(s)	Year published	Type	Notes
Rama Retold	Aubrey Menen	1954		Prohibited in 1955 for allegedly offending religious sentiments by retelling the Ramayana in a secular/satirical manner.

== Indonesia ==
Title	Author(s)	Year published	Type	Notes
The Fugitive (Perburuan) (1950)	Pramoedya Ananta Toer	1950	Novel	Banned in Indonesia in 1950, for containing "subversive" material, including an attempt to promote Marxist–Leninist thought and other Communist theories. As of 2006, the ban is still in effect.
The Satanic Verses (1988)	Salman Rushdie	1988	Novel	Banned for blasphemy against Islam.
Interest	Kevin Gaughen	2015	Novel	Banned by the government of Indonesia for subversive and/or anti-government themes.

== Iran ==
Title	Author(s)	Year published	Type	Notes
The Satanic Verses	Salman Rushdie	1988	Novel	Banned for blasphemy against Islam.
23 Years: A Study of the Prophetic Career of Mohammad	Ali Dashti	1974	Non-fiction	Considered banned and highly controversial in Iran due to critical examination of the life of Muhammad; led to the author's arrest and death sentence by revolutionary court.
The Gods Laugh on Mondays	Reza Khoshnazar	1995	Novel	Was banned in Iran after men torched its publication house.
The Zahir	Paulo Coelho	2005	Novel	Banned in Iran; Coelho's works faced censorship and prohibition by Iranian authorities in the mid‑2000s.

== Ireland ==
Title	Author(s)	Year published	Type	Notes
Christianity not Mysterious	John Toland	1696	Non-fiction	Banned by the Irish Parliament for contradicting the teaching of the Anglican Church. Copies of the book were burnt by the public hangman in Dublin.
Droll Stories	Honoré de Balzac	1837	Short stories	Banned for obscenity in 1953. The ban was lifted in 1967.
Married Love	Marie Stopes	1918	Non-fiction	Banned by the Irish Censorship Board for discussing birth control.
And Quiet Flows the Don	Mikhail Sholokhov	1928–1940	Novel sequence	The English translations of Sholokhov's work were banned for "indecency".
Elmer Gantry	Sinclair Lewis	1927	Novel	Elmer Gantry was banned in the Irish Free State.
The House of Gold	Liam O'Flaherty	1929	Novel	The first book to be banned by the Irish Free State for alleged "indecency". Republished in 2013.
A Farewell to Arms	Ernest Hemingway	1929	Novel	Suppressed in the Irish Free State.
Marriage and Morals	Bertrand Russell	1929	Non-fiction	Suppressed in the Irish Free State for discussing sex education, birth control and open marriages.
Commonsense and the Child	Ethel Mannin	1931	Non-fiction	Banned in the Irish Free State for advocating sex education for adolescents.
The Bulpington of Blup	H. G. Wells	1932	Novel	Banned in the Irish Free State.
Brave New World	Aldous Huxley	1932	Novel	Banned in Ireland in 1932, allegedly because of references of sexual promiscuity.
The Work, Wealth and Happiness of Mankind	H. G. Wells	1932	Non-fiction	Banned in the Irish Free State.
Men of Good Will	Jules Romains	1932–1946	Novel sequence	The English translations of Romains' novel sequence were banned in the Irish Free State.
The Martyr	Liam O'Flaherty	1933	Novel	Banned in the Irish Free State.
The Laws of Life	Halliday Sutherland	1935	Non-fiction	Banned in the Irish Free State for discussing sex education and Calendar-based contraceptive methods – even though The Laws of Life had been granted a Cum permissu superiorum endorsement by the Roman Catholic Diocese of Westminster.
Honourable Estate	Vera Brittain	1936	Novel	Banned in the Irish Free State.
I Knock at the Door	Seán O'Casey	1939	Autobiography	Banned in Ireland.
Dutch Interior	Frank O'Connor	1940	Novel	Banned in Ireland.
The Tailor and Ansty	Eric Cross	1942	Non-fiction	Banned by the Irish censors for discussing sexuality in rural Ireland.
Alone We Embark	Maura Laverty	1943	Novel	Banned in Ireland for obscenity.
Borstal Boy	Brendan Behan	1958	Autobiographical novel	Banned in Ireland in 1958. The Irish Censorship of Publications Board was not obliged to reveal its reason but it is believed that it was rejected for its critique of Irish republicanism and the Catholic Church, and its depiction of adolescent sexuality.
The Country Girls	Edna O'Brien	1960	Novel	Banned by Ireland's censorship board in 1960 for its explicit sexual content.
The Lonely Girl (1962)	Edna O'Brien	1962	Novel	Banned in Ireland in 1962 after Archbishop John Charles McQuaid complained personally to Justice Minister Charles Haughey that it "was particularly bad".
The Dark	John McGahern	1965	Novel	Banned in Ireland for obscenity.
My Secret Garden	Nancy Friday	1973	Non-fiction	Banned in Ireland for its sexual content.

== Israel ==
The importation of books published in enemy countries is forbidden. These currently include Iraq, Lebanon, and Syria.

== Italy ==
Title	Author(s)	Year published	Type	Notes
All Quiet on the Western Front	Erich Maria Remarque	1928	Fiction	Banned in Fascist Italy because of its antimilitarism (currently not banned).
A Farewell to Arms	Ernest Hemingway	1929	Fiction	Banned in Fascist Italy for depicting the Italian Army's defeat at the Battle of Caporetto (currently, this book is not banned).

== Japan ==
Title	Author(s)	Year published	Type	Notes
Little Black Sambo (1899)	Helen Bannerman	1899	Children's story	Banned in Japan (1988–2005) to quell "political threats to boycott Japanese cultural exports", although the pictures were not those of the original version.

== Kenya ==
Title	Author(s)	Year published	Type	Notes
The Satanic Verses (1988)	Salman Rushdie	1988	Novel	Banned for blasphemy against Islam.

== Korea ==
=== Joseon (1392-1897) ===
Title	Author	Type	Notes
The Tale of Seol Gongchan	Chae Su	Novel	During the Joseon dynasty, works addressing subjects considered taboo on political or religious grounds or deemed harmful to public morals were censored. The Tale of Seol Gongchan criticized the 1506 Jungjong Restoration. In late Joseon, Catholic texts such as Seongchal giryak and Tonghak texts such as Yongdam yusa were suppressed as they contained ideas that threatened social and political order. Jeonggamnok foretold the fall of the Joseon dynasty and the establishment of a new dynasty ruled by the Jeong clan.
Seongchal giryak	Marie-Nicolas-Antoine Daveluy	Religious text	
Yongdam yusa	Choe Si-hyeong	Religious text	
Jeonggamnok	Unknown	Religious text	

=== Korea under Japanese rule (1910-1945) ===
Title	Author(s)	Type	Notes
Essential Readings for Children (유년필독)	Hyun Chae	Textbook	In the 1920s, books promoting patriotic sentiment were banned. Socialist publications were also prohibited as socialist-led independence movements gained momentum after the 1919 March First Movement. In the 1940s, nearly all Korean-language books were banned except those praising Japanese imperial rule. Essential Readings for Children, a textbook for children published during the Korean Empire (1897-1910), covered topics such as history, geography, notable figures, customs, and religion. Eulji Mundeok sought to foster a spirit of independence and resistance through the biography of a hero who overcame a national crisis. The Bloody History of the Korean Independence Movement documents the history of the anti-Japanese struggle from 1884 to 1920. Statistical Study of Korea used statistical evidence to demonstrate Japan’s economic exploitation of Korea.
Eulji Mundeok	Sin Ch'aeho	Non-fiction	
The Bloody History of the Korean Independence Movement (한국독립운동지혈사)	Pak Ŭnsik	Non-fiction	
KAPF Poets’ Anthology	Korea Artista Proleta Federacio	Poem	
Statistical Study of Korea (숫자조선연구)	Yi Yeo-seong and Kim Se-yong	Non-fiction	

=== North Korea (1948-) ===
Title	Author	Type	Notes
Admonitions on Governing the People (목민심서)	Chŏng Yagyong	Non-fiction	As North Korea shifted toward a monolithic leadership system, works of Marx and Lenin were banned. After the establishment of Juche ideology in the 1960s, conformity with it became the primary criterion for banning books. In the 1960s, North Korea purged those who sought to revive traditional culture and banned books such as Admonitions on Governing the People.

=== South Korea (1948-) ===
Title	Author(s)	Year published (South Korea)	Type	Notes
The Five Bandits (오적)	Kim Chi-ha	1970	Poem	The Park Chung Hee government (1963-1979) suppressed the publication of books against anti-communist and Cold War ideologies. The Five Bandits criticized corruption of the upper class. The Logic of an Age in Transition argued that the Vietnam War was a national liberation struggle in the Third World. Aunt Suni depicted the brutality of the 1948 Jeju uprising. Perceptions of Korean History before and after Liberation examined major political, economic, and social events and figures in Korea since the division of the country. Pedagogy argued that political education should be used to promote public awareness and School Is Dead criticized institutionalized education.
The Logic of an Age in Transition (전환 시대의 논리)	Rhee Yeung-hui	1974	Non-fiction	
Aunt Suni (순이 삼촌)	Hyun Ki-young	1978	Novel	
Perceptions of Korean History before and after Liberation (해방 전후사의 인식)	Song Geon-ho et al	1979	Non-fiction	
Pedagogy	Paulo Freire	1979	Non-fiction	
School is Dead	Everett Reimer	1979	Non-fiction	
A Proper Understanding of Liberation Theology (해방 신학의 올바른 이해)	Hahm Se-woong	1984	Non-fiction	The Chun Doo-hwan government (1979-1988) banned books that "advocated democratization or opposed capitalism, incited labor struggles by siding with communism, or promoted leftist and subversive ideologies". A Proper Understanding of Liberation Theology argued that marginalized groups should be angered by their oppression. The Structure of the Korean Economy criticized collusion between political and business elites and an economy dependent on foreign loans.The Origins of the Korean War argued that the Korean War (1950-1953) broke out because of conflict between pro-Japanese conservative forces and progressive nationalists. The Torn Land depicts the circumstances surrounding Korea’s liberation.
The Structure of the Korean Economy (한국경제구조론)	Park Hyun-chae	1986	Non-fiction	
Origins of the Korean War	Bruce Cumings	1986	Non-fiction	
The Torn Land (찢겨진 산하)	Jeong Gyeong-mo	1986	Non-fiction	
Prison Notebooks	Antonio Gramsci	1986	Non-fiction	
Taebaek Mountain Range (태백산맥)	Jo Jeong-rae	1986	Novel	After the 1987 June Democratic Struggle, the government lifted bans on 431 of 650 books. Works by Marx and Lenin and books related to North Korea began to be published, but the government classified these books as "pro-enemy material" under the National Security Act and confiscated them. Taebaek Mountain Range, a ten-volume novel published between 1986 and 1989, portrays the struggles of diverse characters from 1948 to 1953.
Nord-koreanisches Reisetagebuch	Luise Rinser	1988	Non-fiction	After the 1987 June Democratic Struggle, the government lifted bans on 431 of 650 books. Works by Marx and Lenin and books related to North Korea began to be published, but the government classified these books as "pro-enemy material" under the National Security Act and confiscated them. Taebaek Mountain Range, a ten-volume novel published between 1986 and 1989, portrays the struggles of diverse characters from 1948 to 1953.
Das Kapital	Karl Marx	1989	Non-fiction	After the 1987 June Democratic Struggle, the government lifted bans on 431 of 650 books. Works by Marx and Lenin and books related to North Korea began to be published, but the government classified these books as "pro-enemy material" under the National Security Act and confiscated them. Taebaek Mountain Range, a ten-volume novel published between 1986 and 1989, portrays the struggles of diverse characters from 1948 to 1953.
The Communist Manifesto	Karl Marx	1989	Non-fiction	After the 1987 June Democratic Struggle, the government lifted bans on 431 of 650 books. Works by Marx and Lenin and books related to North Korea began to be published, but the government classified these books as "pro-enemy material" under the National Security Act and confiscated them. Taebaek Mountain Range, a ten-volume novel published between 1986 and 1989, portrays the struggles of diverse characters from 1948 to 1953.
One Spoon on This Earth (지상에 숟가락 하나)	Hyun Ki-young	1999	Novel	In 2008, the Ministry of National Defense selected 23 books deemed "subversive" and categorized them into three groups: pro-North Korean, anti-government and anti-American, and anti-capitalist. It banned the possession and distribution of these books within the military. MND stated that it had obtained information that Hanchongnyon was planning to send books to military bases and consequently banned all 23 books. Hanchongnyon denied the allegation.
Auf Der Universität	Theodor Storm	1999	Non-fiction	In 2008, the Ministry of National Defense selected 23 books deemed "subversive" and categorized them into three groups: pro-North Korean, anti-government and anti-American, and anti-capitalist. It banned the possession and distribution of these books within the military. MND stated that it had obtained information that Hanchongnyon was planning to send books to military bases and consequently banned all 23 books. Hanchongnyon denied the allegation.
Year 501: The Conquest Continues	Noam Chomsky	2000	Non-fiction	In 2008, the Ministry of National Defense selected 23 books deemed "subversive" and categorized them into three groups: pro-North Korean, anti-government and anti-American, and anti-capitalist. It banned the possession and distribution of these books within the military. MND stated that it had obtained information that Hanchongnyon was planning to send books to military bases and consequently banned all 23 books. Hanchongnyon denied the allegation.
The Global Trap	Hans-Peter Martin and Harald Schumann	2003	Non-fiction	In 2008, the Ministry of National Defense selected 23 books deemed "subversive" and categorized them into three groups: pro-North Korean, anti-government and anti-American, and anti-capitalist. It banned the possession and distribution of these books within the military. MND stated that it had obtained information that Hanchongnyon was planning to send books to military bases and consequently banned all 23 books. Hanchongnyon denied the allegation.
Bad Samaritans	Ha-Joon Chang	2007	Non-fiction	In 2008, the Ministry of National Defense selected 23 books deemed "subversive" and categorized them into three groups: pro-North Korean, anti-government and anti-American, and anti-capitalist. It banned the possession and distribution of these books within the military. MND stated that it had obtained information that Hanchongnyon was planning to send books to military bases and consequently banned all 23 books. Hanchongnyon denied the allegation.
Slots	Shin Gyeong-jin	2007	Novel	In 2011, Sisain obtained a list of "subversive books" circulating within the South Korean military. The list contained 42 books, and all 19 newly added ones were classified as being "anti-capitalist". The Ministry of National Defense stated that the 2008 list remains in effect but it had never issued an expanded version of it.
Respect: Everything a Guy Needs to Know About Sex	Inti Chavez Perez	2020	Non‑fiction	The Publication Ethics Committee classified it as a "harmful publication for adolescents" and banned its sale to adolescents.

== Kuwait ==
Title	Author(s)	Year published	Type	Notes
The Satanic Verses (1988)	Salman Rushdie	1988	Novel	Banned for blasphemy against Islam.

== Lebanon ==
Title	Author(s)	Year published	Type	Notes
Sophie's Choice (1979)	William Styron	1979	Novel	Banned in Lebanon for its positive depiction of Jews.
Schindler's Ark (1982)	Thomas Keneally	1982	Novel	Banned in Lebanon for its positive depiction of Jews.
The Da Vinci Code	Dan Brown	2003	Novel	Banned in September 2004 in Lebanon after Catholic leaders deemed it offensive to Christianity. (See Criticism of The Da Vinci Code.)
Grover's Eight Nights of Light	Jodie Shepherd	2017	Sesame Street book	Banned in 2017 for promoting Hanukkah.

== Liberia ==
Title	Author(s)	Year published	Type	Notes
The Satanic Verses (1988)	Salman Rushdie	1988	Novel	Banned for blasphemy against Islam.

== Malaysia ==
Title	Author(s)	Year published	Type	Notes
The Satanic Verses (1988)	Salman Rushdie	1988	Novel	Banned for blasphemy against Islam.
Onward Muslim Soldiers	Robert B. Spencer	2003	Non‑fiction	On July 12, 2007, the government of Malaysia announced a ban on Spencer's book, citing "confusion and anxiety among the Muslims" as the cause.
Fifty Shades Trilogy	E. L. James	2011–2012	Novel	The entire trilogy was banned in Malaysia from 2015 for containing "sadistic" material and "threat to morality".
The Mask of Sanity (2017)	Jacob M. Appel	2017	Novel	Banned pre-emptively in Malaysia for blasphemy.
Rebirth: Reformasi, Resistance, and Hope in New Malaysia	Kean Wong	2020	Non‑fiction	Banned for containing insulting elements to the Malaysian coat of arms which is likely to be prejudicial to public order, security, national interest, alarm public opinion and contrary to any law, and therefore is "absolutely prohibited throughout Malaysia".
Gay is OK! A Christian Perspective (2013‍–‍2022)	Boon Lin Ngeo	2013	Non‑fiction	Banned for attempting to promote homosexual culture in Malaysia, which goes against religious and cultural sensitivities in the country. In 2022, the ban was challenged through a judicial review petition in High Court of Kuala Lumpur. The court quashed the ban and ordered the Home Ministry of Malaysia to pay RM 5000 to the author.
Peichi (Tamil: பேய்ச்சி)	Ma. Naveen	2020	Novel	Banned for containing pornographic and immoral content. Notably, it was the first Tamil language publication to be banned in the country.
A Million Kisses in Your Lifetime	Monica Murphy	2022	Novel	The ministry explained on January 7, 2025, that the ban is part of a preventive measure to stop the spread of ideologies and movements that conflict with Malaysia's multicultural values.
Lose You to Find Me	Erik J. Brown	2023	Novel	The ministry explained on January 7, 2025, that the ban is part of a preventive measure to stop the spread of ideologies and movements that conflict with Malaysia's multicultural values.
Punai	Asyraf Bakti	2022	Novel	The ministry explained on January 7, 2025, that the ban is part of a preventive measure to stop the spread of ideologies and movements that conflict with Malaysia's multicultural values.
Scattered Showers	Rainbow Rowell	2022	Novel	The ministry explained on January 7, 2025, that the ban is part of a preventive measure to stop the spread of ideologies and movements that conflict with Malaysia's multicultural values.
When Everything Feels Like The Movies	Raziel Reid	2014	Novel	The ministry explained on January 7, 2025, that the ban is part of a preventive measure to stop the spread of ideologies and movements that conflict with Malaysia's multicultural values.
What If It's Us	Becky Albertalli and Adam Silvera	2018	Novel	The ministry explained on January 7, 2025, that the ban is part of a preventive measure to stop the spread of ideologies and movements that conflict with Malaysia's multicultural values.
My Shadow is Purple	Scott Stuart	2022	Fiction	Banned for attempting to promote homosexual culture in Malaysia, which goes against religious and cultural sensitivities in the country. The home ministry said these books have been banned under Section 7(1) of Act 301 as they are considered 'undesirable publications' on January 21, 2025, and was later publicly announced on February 8.
Koleksi Puisi Masturbasi	Benz Ali	2015	Poetry	Banned for its suggestive name and immoral content. The home ministry said these books have been banned under Section 7(1) of Act 301 as they are considered 'undesirable publications' on January 22, 2025, and was later publicly announced on February 8.
All That's Left in the World	Erik J. Brown	2022	Novel	Banned for attempting to promote homosexual culture in Malaysia, which goes against religious and cultural sensitivities in the country. The home ministry said these books have been banned under Section 7(1) of Act 301 as they are considered 'undesirable publications' on January 22, 2025, and was later publicly announced on February 8.

== Mauritius ==
Title	Author(s)	Year published	Type	Notes
The Rape of Sita (1993)	Lindsay Collen	1993	Novel	Banned for blasphemy against Hindu goddess.

== Morocco ==
Title	Author(s)	Year published	Type	Notes
Notre ami le roi (1993)	Gilles Perrault	1993	Biography of Hassan II of Morocco	Banned in Morocco. This book is a biography of King Hassan and examines cases of torture, killing, and political imprisonment said to have been carried out by the Moroccan government at his orders.
Le roi prédateur (2012)	Catherine Graciet and Éric Laurent	2012	Investigative journalism	Banned in Morocco. This book makes allegedly "defamatory" accusations of corruption against Mohammed VI of Morocco, after investigating the exponential growth of his wealth.

== Myanmar ==
Title	Author(s)	Year published	Type	Notes
Myanmar's Rohingya Genocide: Identity, History and Hate Speech	Ronan Lee	2021	Academic non-fiction	Banned by Myanmar's military authorities in 2022. The publishing house distributing the book had its licence revoked; the book examines the persecution and genocide of the Rohingya.
My Possessive Step-bro	Hnaung Yeik	Unknown	Novel	Banned by the military authorities in April 2022. The novel, about a romantic relationship between two men, was distributed by Shwe Lab Book House.
A Butterfly Rests on My Heart; 1500 Miles to You; Love Planted by Hate; Tie the Knot of Love; Match Made in Clouds; DISO+Extra; Concerned Person U Wai	Aung Khant; Mahura; Myint Mo; DiDi Zaw; Red in Peace; Vivian	Unknown	Novels	Seven books with LGBTQ+ themes were banned by the Ministry of Information on January 9, 2025, which described their content as "obscene" and socially unacceptable and announced legal action against their publishers.
Thakin Kyin Hylin Pan Daw Mu; Oh…Ai Achit Myar Yal Bar Chaung Sone Phoe Khat; Yin Khwin Nyar Yal Chit Lon Po Ai	Unknown	Unknown	Novels	Three additional LGBTQ+-themed books were banned on January 16, 2025. The authorities also announced legal action against Euphoria Book House and Master Printing Service and said their business licences would be revoked.
The Kafala System	Saad Kassis-Mohamed Center	2026	Non-fiction	Reported banned in Myanmar in August 2026. The book examines the kafala system and compares restrictions on migrant workers' freedom of movement with trafficking and forced labour in Myanmar's online scam compounds.

== Nepal ==
Title	Author(s)	Year published	Type	Notes
The Satanic Verses (1988)	Salman Rushdie	1988	Novel	Banned for blasphemy against Islam.
A Modern Approach to Social Studies (2010)	Unknown	2010	School textbook	Banned for blasphemy against Islam.
Self Study Material on Nepal's Territory and Border (2020)	Ministry of Education, Science and Technology	2020	Map book	Banned for irredentist views regarding the country's neighbors.

== Netherlands ==
Title	Author(s)	Year published	Type	Notes
The Cover-up General	Edwin Giltay	2014	Non‑fiction thriller	Banned in the Netherlands by court order in 2015 as a former spy of Dutch military intelligence claimed she was described falsely in this Srebrenica book. Ban lifted by the Court of Appeal of The Hague in 2016.

== New Zealand ==
Title	Author(s)	Year published	Type	Notes
Lolita (1955)	Vladimir Nabokov	1955	Novel	Banned for being "obscene"; uncensored in 1964.
Borstal Boy	Brendan Behan	1958	Autobiographical novel	Banned shortly after its ban in Ireland in 1958. It was allowed to be published in New Zealand in 1963.
The Peaceful Pill Handbook (2007)	Philip Nitschke and Fiona Stewart	2007	Instructional manual on euthanasia	Initially banned in New Zealand by Office of Film & Literature Classification since it was deemed to be objectionable. In May 2008, an edited version of the book was allowed for sale if sealed and an indication of the censorship classification was displayed.
Into the River (2012)	Ted Dawe	2012	Novel	Banned in New Zealand in 2015; subsequently unrestricted in the same year.

== Nigeria ==
Title	Author(s)	Year published	Type	Notes
My Watch (2005)	Olusegun Obasanjo	2014	Autobiography	Banned in Nigeria because this three-volume memoir of the former Nigerian president were highly critical of nearly everyone in Nigerian politics. The books were ordered to be seized by the High Court in Nigeria until a libel case had been heard in court.

== Norway ==
Title	Author(s)	Year published	Type	Notes
Fra Kristiania-Bohêmen	Hans Jæger	1885	Novel	Sexually explicit.
Albertine	Christian Krohg	1886	Novel	Sexually explicit.
Snorri the Seal (1941)	Frithjof Sælen	1941	Fable	Satirical book banned during the German occupation of Norway.
The Song of the Red Ruby	Agnar Mykle	1956	Novel	Sexually explicit. Ban lifted in 1958.
Without a Stitch	Jens Bjørneboe	1966	Novel	Sexually explicit. The ban was never formally lifted.

== Pakistan ==
Title	Author(s)	Year published	Type	Notes
Satyarth Prakash	Dayananda Saraswati	1875	Religious text	Swami Dayananda's religious text Satyarth Prakash was banned in some princely states and in Sindh in 1944 and is still banned in Sindh.
Rangila Rasul (1927)	Pt. Chamupati	1927	Religious	Currently banned in India, Pakistan, and Bangladesh.
Jinnah of Pakistan (1982)	Stanley Wolpert	1982	Biography	Banned in 1984 by the military dictator Zia-ul-Haq's government because of some 'offending passages'. Ban lifted in 1989 by the next democratic government.
The Satanic Verses (1988)	Salman Rushdie	1988	Novel	Banned for blasphemy against Islam.
The Truth About Muhammad	Robert Spencer	2006	Non‑fiction	On December 20, 2006, the government of Pakistan announced a ban on Spencer's book, citing "objectionable material" as the cause.

== Papal States ==
Title	Author(s)	Year published	Type	Notes
On the Origins and Perpetual Use of the Legislative Powers of the Apostolic Kings of Hungary in Matters Ecclesiastical (1764)	Adam F. Kollár	1764	Political	Banned in the Papal States for arguments against the political role of the Roman Catholic Church. Original title: De Originibus et Usu perpetuo.

== Papua New Guinea ==
Title	Author(s)	Year published	Type	Notes
The Satanic Verses (1988)	Salman Rushdie	1988	Novel	Banned for blasphemy against Islam.

== Philippines ==
Title	Author(s)	Year published	Type	Notes
Noli Me Tángere	Jose Rizal	1887	Novel	Banned by Spanish colonial authorities in the Philippines due to being critical to the Spanish government.
El Filibusterismo	Jose Rizal	1891	Novel	Banned by Spanish colonial authorities in the Philippines due to being critical to the Spanish government.
The Conjugal Dictatorship of Ferdinand and Imelda Marcos	Primitivo Mijares	1976	Non-fiction	Banned for during the Martial Law period due to being critical of the administration of President Ferdinand Marcos.
The Untold Story of Imelda Marcos	Carmen Pedrosa	1969	Biography	Banned in 1972, shortly after the start of the Martial Law period under President Ferdinand Marcos. The "unauthorized" biography was banned for the depiction of First Lady Imelda Marcos' extravagance.
Tawid diwa sa pananagisag ni Bienvenido Lumbera: Ang Bayan, ang Nanunulat at ang Magasing Sagisag sa Imahinatibong Yugto ng Batas Militar 1975–1979	Dexter Cayanes			Research on the literary works by Bienvenido Lumbera, who was imprisoned during the Martial Law period under President Ferdinand Marcos. Banned in 2022 by the Commission on the Filipino Language (KWF) from public libraries and schools for being "anti‑government".
Teatro Political Dos	Malou Jacob			Banned in 2022 by the Commission on the Filipino Language (KWF) from public libraries and schools for being "anti‑government". The works are previously published under the auspices of the KWF.
Kalatas: Mga Kuwentong Bayan at Kuwentong Buhay	Rommel Rodriguez			Banned in 2022 by the Commission on the Filipino Language (KWF) from public libraries and schools for being "anti‑government". The works are previously published under the auspices of the KWF.
May Hadlang ang Umaga	Don Pagusara	Sometime in the 1980s	Fiction	Banned in 2022 by the Commission on the Filipino Language (KWF) from public libraries and schools for being "anti‑government". The works are previously published under the auspices of the KWF.
Labas: Mga Palabas ng Sentro	Reuel Aguilla			Banned in 2022 by the Commission on the Filipino Language (KWF) from public libraries and schools for being "anti‑government

== Poland ==
Title	Author(s)	Year published	Type	Notes
Mirror of the Polish Crown (1618)	Sebastian Miczyński	1618	Anti‑Semitic pamphlet	Because this pamphlet published in 1618 was one of the causes of the anti-Jewish riots in Cracow, it was banned by Sigismund III Vasa.
Mein Kampf (1925)	Adolf Hitler	1925	Political manifesto	Banned until 1992.

== Portugal ==
Title	Author(s)	Year published	Type	Notes
História do Mundo para as Crianças [pt]	Monteiro Lobato	1933	Novel	The book was banned by the Portuguese government without any clear reason. According to the author, one possible reason was because he was from the "current of thought what claims that the discovery of Brazil happened 'by random'" or by the fact he "have registered the history of the 1600 years cut to the Arabian navy by Vasco da Gama".
New Portuguese Letters (Novas Cartas Portuguesas)	Maria Isabel Barreno, Maria Teresa Horta and Maria Velho da Costa	1972		Banned as "pornographic and an offense to public morals"; authors charged with "abuse of the freedom of the press" and "outrage to public decency"; uplifted after the Carnation Revolution in 1974.

== Qatar ==
Title	Author(s)	Year published	Type	Notes
The Boys	Garth Ennis	2012	Comic book series	Banned in Qatar in 2012.
The Man Who Wouldn't Stand Up (2012)	Jacob M. Appel	2012	Novel	Banned in Qatar in 2014 for its depiction of Islam.
Love Comes Later (2014)	Mohanalakshmi Rajakumar	2014	Novel	Banned in Qatar.

== Roman Empire ==
Title	Author(s)	Year published	Type	Notes
Thalia	Arius (AD 250 or 256 ‍–‍ 336)		Theological tract, partly in verse	Banned in the Roman Empire in the 330's+ for contradicting Trinitarianism. All of Arius's writings were ordered burned and Arius exiled, and presumably assassinated for his writings. Banned by the Catholic Church for the next thousand plus years.

== Russia ==
Title	Author(s)	Year published	Type	Notes
Quran	Unknown		Religious text	In 2013, a Russian court in Novorossiysk banned a translation of the Quran by Elmir Kuliyev under the country's 'extremism' laws. The ban was soon overturned.
Rights of Man (1791)	Thomas Paine	1791	Political theory	Banned in Tsarist Russia after the Decembrist revolt.
The Communist Manifesto	Karl Marx and Friedrich Engels	1848	Political Manifesto	Prohibited by several countries, including Tsarist Russia.
Looking Backward	Edward Bellamy	1888	Novel	Prohibited by the Tsarist Russian censors.
The Protocols of the Elders of Zion (1903)	Unknown	1903	A forgery, portraying a Jewish conspiracy to take over the world	Banned in various libraries and many attempts to ban in various nations, such as in Russia.
Mein Kampf (1925)	Adolf Hitler	1925	Political manifesto	Banned in the Russian Federation as extremist.
Apocalypse Culture	Adam Parfrey	1987	Non-fiction	Collection of articles, interviews and documents exploring various marginal aspects of 20th century culture. In 2006, shortly after Ultra.Kultura (Ультра.Культура) published a Russian edition combining Apocalypse Culture and Apocalypse Culture II as a single volume titled Культура времен Апокалипсиса, the volume was banned by Kremlin decree.
Siege	James Mason	1992	Non-fiction	Anthology of essays advocating for neo-Nazi revolution through terrorism. Banned on August 14, 2023.
Atomwaffen Division Program	Unknown	2020	Non-fiction	Manifesto of the Atomwaffen Division, a neo-Nazi group proscribed as a terrorist organization. Banned on May 26, 2026 by court as "extremist material".

=== Soviet Union ===
Title	Author(s)	Year published	Type	Notes
Works	Friedrich Nietzsche	1872–1901	Non-fiction	Banned in Soviet Union since 1923 on proposal of Nadezhda Krupskaya. All works were placed on the list of forbidden books and kept in libraries only for restricted, authorized use.
Animal Farm	George Orwell	1945	Political novella	Completed in 1943, Orwell found that no publisher would print the book, due to its criticism of the USSR, an important ally of Britain in the War. Once published, the book was banned in the USSR and other communist countries.
Nineteen Eighty-Four (1949)	George Orwell	1949	Novel	Banned by the Soviet Union. It was not until 1990 that the Soviet Union legalised the book and it was re-released after editing.
Doctor Zhivago	Boris Pasternak	1955–1988	Novel	Banned in the Soviet Union until 1988 for criticizing life in Russia after the Russian Revolution. When its author, Boris Pasternak, won the Nobel Prize for Literature in 1958, he was forced to reject it under government pressure.
One Day in the Life of Ivan Denisovich (1962)	Alexander Solzhenitsyn	1962	Novel	Banned from publication in the Soviet Union in 1964.
The First Circle (1968)	Aleksandr Solzhenitsyn	1968	Novel	After Nikita Khrushchev was removed from power in 1964, all extant and forthcoming works by Aleksandr Solzhenitsyn were banned in the Soviet Union. This work details the lives of scientists forced to work in a Stalinist research center.
The Gulag Archipelago (1973)	Aleksandr Solzhenitsyn	1973	Non-fiction	Banned in the Soviet Union because it went against the image the Soviet Government tried to project of itself and its policies. However, it has been available in the former Soviet Union since at least the 1980s. In 2009, the Education Ministry of Russia added The Gulag Archipelago to the curriculum for high-school students.

== Saudi Arabia ==
Title	Author(s)	Year published	Type	Notes
Queen of Sheba and Biblical Scholarship	Bernard Leeman		History	Currently banned in Saudi Arabia for suggesting the Hebrews originated in Yemen and their Israelite successors established their original pre‍–‍586 BCE kingdoms of Israel and Judah between Medina and Yemen.
Goat Days	Benyamin & Joseph Koyippally	2008	Novel	Currently banned in Saudi Arabia.
Fazail-e-Amaal	Zakariyya Kandhlawi	Sometime between the 1920s and 1950s	Sufi evangalism	Currently banned in Saudi Arabia.

== Senegal ==
Title	Author(s)	Year published	Type	Notes
The Satanic Verses (1988)	Salman Rushdie	1988	Novel	Banned for blasphemy against Islam.

== Singapore ==
Title	Author(s)	Year published	Type	Notes
Value, Price and Profit	Karl Marx	1865	Non‑fiction	Banned under the Internal Security (Prohibition of Publications) (Consolidation) Order.
Origin of Family, Private Property and State	Friedrich Engels	1884	Non‑fiction	Banned under the Internal Security (Prohibition of Publications) (Consolidation) Order.
One Step Forward, Two Steps Back	Vladimir Lenin	1904	Non‑fiction	Banned under the Internal Security (Prohibition of Publications) (Consolidation) Order.
Theories of Surplus Value	Karl Marx	1905	Non‑fiction	Banned under the Internal Security (Prohibition of Publications) (Consolidation) Order.
Two Tactics of Social Democracy in the Democratic Revolution	Vladimir Lenin	1905	Non‑fiction	Banned under the Internal Security (Prohibition of Publications) (Consolidation) Order.
Anarchism or Socialism?	Joseph Stalin	1907	Non‑fiction	Banned under the Internal Security (Prohibition of Publications) (Consolidation) Order.
Fundamental Problems of Marxism	Georgi Plekhanov	1908	Political pamphlet	Banned under the Internal Security (Prohibition of Publications) (Consolidation) Order.
Heroines of the Modern Progress	Elmer C. Adams	1913	Non-fiction	Banned under the Internal Security (Prohibition of Publications) (Consolidation) Order.
The Right of Nations to Self-Determination	Vladimir Lenin	1914	Non-fiction	Banned under the Internal Security (Prohibition of Publications) (Consolidation) Order.
What Is to Be Done?	Vladimir Lenin	1917	Non-fiction	Banned under the Internal Security (Prohibition of Publications) (Consolidation) Order.
Imperialism, the Highest Stage of Capitalism	Vladimir Lenin	1917	Non-fiction	Banned under the Internal Security (Prohibition of Publications) (Consolidation) Order.
State and Revolution	Vladimir Lenin	1917	Non-fiction	Banned under the Internal Security (Prohibition of Publications) (Consolidation) Order.
The Proletarian Revolution and the Renegade Kautsky	Vladimir Lenin	1918	Non-fiction	Banned under the Internal Security (Prohibition of Publications) (Consolidation) Order.
Friedrich Engels: A Biography	Gustav Mayer	1920	Biography	Banned under the Internal Security (Prohibition of Publications) (Consolidation) Order.
"Left-Wing" Communism: An Infantile Disorder	Vladimir Lenin	1920	Non‑fiction	Banned under the Internal Security (Prohibition of Publications) (Consolidation) Order.
On Cooperation	Vladimir Lenin	1923	Non‑fiction	Banned under the Internal Security (Prohibition of Publications) (Consolidation) Order.
Problems of Leninism	Joseph Stalin	1926	Non‑fiction	Banned under the Internal Security (Prohibition of Publications) (Consolidation) Order.
Time, Forward!	Valentin Kataev	1932	Novel	Banned under the Internal Security (Prohibition of Publications) (Consolidation) Order.
How the Steel Was Tempered	Nikolai Ostrovsky	1936	Novel	Banned under the Internal Security (Prohibition of Publications) (Consolidation) Order.
Marxism and the National and Colonial Question	Joseph Stalin	1937	Non-fiction	Banned under the Internal Security (Prohibition of Publications) (Consolidation) Order.
Combat Liberalism	Mao Zedong	1937	Non-fiction	Banned under the Internal Security (Prohibition of Publications) (Consolidation) Order.
The A to Z of the Soviet Union	Alex Page	1946	Non-fiction	Banned under the Internal Security (Prohibition of Publications) (Consolidation) Order.
Aspects of China's Anti-Japanese Struggle	Mao Zedong	1948	Non-fiction	Banned under the Internal Security (Prohibition of Publications) (Consolidation) Order.
The Case for Communism	William Gallacher	1949	Non-fiction	Banned under the Internal Security (Prohibition of Publications) (Consolidation) Order.
Twilight of World Capitalism	William Z. Foster	1949	Non-fiction	Banned under the Internal Security (Prohibition of Publications) (Consolidation) Order.
Concerning Marxism in Linguistics	Joseph Stalin	1950	Non-fiction	Banned under the Internal Security (Prohibition of Publications) (Consolidation) Order.
The Social and State Structure of the USSR	Alexander Karpinsky	1952	Non-fiction	Banned under the Internal Security (Prohibition of Publications) (Consolidation) Order.
The Satanic Verses	Salman Rushdie	1988	Novel	Banned in 1989 for blasphemy against Islam.
What Islam Is All About	Yahiya Emerick	1997	Religious education	Banned in 2018 for "promoting enmity among different religious communities".
The Wisdom of Jihad	Abuhuraira Abdurrahman	2005	Non-fiction	Banned in 2018 for "promoting enmity among different religious communities".
Things that Nullify One's Islaam	Shaykh al‑Islaam Muhammad ibn 'Abdil‑Wahhaab	2013	Non-fiction	Banned in 2018 for "promoting enmity among different religious communities".
Red Lines: Political Cartoons and the Struggle Against Censorship	Cherian George and Sonny Liew	2021	Non-fiction	Banned in 2021 for offensive content against Muslims.

== South Africa ==
Title	Author(s)	Year published	Type	Notes
Frankenstein (1818)	Mary Shelley	1818	Novel	Banned in apartheid South Africa in 1955 for containing "obscene" or "indecent" material.
The Lottery (1948)	Shirley Jackson	1948	Short story	Banned in South Africa during Apartheid.
Lolita (1955)	Vladimir Nabokov	1955	Novel	Banned for being "obscene"; this ban was lifted in 1982.
A World of Strangers	Nadine Gordimer	1958	Novel	Banned in South Africa because of its criticism of Apartheid.
Why We Can't Wait	Martin Luther King Jr.	1964	Non-fiction	Banned in South Africa because of its criticism of white supremacy.
The First Book of Africa	Langston Hughes	1964	Non‑fiction; Children's book	Banned in South Africa for its celebration of Black African culture.
The Autobiography of Malcolm X	Malcolm X with Alex Haley	1965	Non-fiction	Banned in South Africa because of its criticism of white supremacy.
Black Power: The Politics of Liberation	Stokely Carmichael and Charles V. Hamilton	1967	Non-fiction	Banned in South Africa because of its criticism of white supremacy.
Soul on Ice	Eldridge Cleaver	1968	Non-fiction	Banned in South Africa because of its criticism of white supremacy, and its sexual content.
The Satanic Bible (1969)	Anton LaVey	1969	Religious text	Banned during apartheid in South Africa from 1973 to 1993 for moral reasons.
The Struggle Is My Life	Nelson Mandela	1978	Non-fiction	Banned in Apartheid South Africa until 1990.
Burger's Daughter	Nadine Gordimer	1979	Novel	Banned in South Africa in July 1979 for going against the government's racial policies; the ban was reversed in October of the same year.
July's People (1981)	Nadine Gordimer	1981	Novel	Banned during the Apartheid-era in South Africa. July's People was later included in the South African school curriculum.

== Spain ==
Title	Author(s)	Year published	Type	Notes
Works	Johannes Kepler	1596–1634	Non-fiction	Banned by Habsburg Monarchy of Spain for perceived heresy.
Works	Voltaire	1727–1778	Novels, Plays, Non-fiction	Voltaire's entire body of work was banned by the Bourbon Monarchy of Spain, after it was condemned by the Spanish Inquisition.
Works	Vicente Blasco Ibáñez	1892–1928	Novels, Non‑fiction	All of Blasco Ibáñez's books were banned by the Franco government in 1939.
A Short History of the World	H. G. Wells	1922	Non-fiction	An expanded, Spanish‑language translation of A Short History of the World, discussing recent world events, was banned by Spanish censors in 1940. This edition of A Short History was not published in Spain until 1963. In two 1948 reports, Spanish censors gave a list of objections to the books's publication. These were that the book "shows socialist inclinations, attacks the Catholic Church, gives a twisted interpretation of the Spanish Civil War and the Spanish National Movement, and contains 'tortuous concepts'."
Ulysses	James Joyce	1922	Novel	The complete 1945 Spanish‑language translation of Ulysses was suppressed by the Spanish authorities until 1962.
The Story of Ferdinand	Munro Leaf	1936	Children's fiction	Banned in Francoist Spain.
Homage to Catalonia	George Orwell	1938	Non-fiction	Banned in Francoist Spain for its support of the Republican faction during the Spanish Civil War.
For Whom the Bell Tolls	Ernest Hemingway	1940	Novel	Suppressed by the Spanish authorities until 1968.
Works	Federico García Lorca	1939	Poetry, drama	Banned until 1954; published in Argentina.
You Can't Be Too Careful	H. G. Wells	1941	Novel	Banned in Francoist Spain for criticizing Christianity, and for mentioning the Bombing of Guernica by the Axis air forces.
The Spanish Labyrinth	Gerald Brenan	1943	Non-fiction	Banned in Francoist Spain because of its strong criticism of the Nationalist Faction's actions during the Spanish Civil War.
The Second Sex	Simone de Beauvoir	1949	Non-fiction	Banned in Francoist Spain for its advocacy of feminism.
The Hive	Camilo José Cela	1950	Fiction	Banned by censors of Francoist Spain.
The Spanish Civil War	Hugh Thomas	1961	Non-fiction	Banned by censors of Francoist Spain for its negative depiction of the Nationalist Faction during the Civil War, and its critique of the Franco regime.
The Death of Lorca	Ian Gibson	1971	Biography	Banned briefly in Spain.

== Sri Lanka ==
Title	Author(s)	Year published	Type	Notes
The Satanic Verses (1988)	Salman Rushdie	1988	Novel	Banned for blasphemy against Islam.

== Tanzania ==
Title	Author(s)	Year published	Type	Notes
The Satanic Verses (1988)	Salman Rushdie	1988	Novel	Banned for blasphemy against Islam.

== Taiwan ==
Title	Author(s)	Year published	Type	Notes
Various works	Shen Congwen	1902–1988	Novels	"Denounced by the Communists and Nationalists alike, Mr. Shen saw his writings banned in Taiwan, while mainland China publishing houses burned his books and destroyed printing plates for his novels."

== Thailand ==
Title	Author(s)	Year published	Type	Notes
The Devil's Discus	Rayne Kruger	1964	Non-fiction	Banned in Thailand in 2006 for violating the country's lese-majesté rules through its discussion of the murder of Thailand's king in 1946.
The Satanic Verses (1988)	Salman Rushdie	1988	Novel	Banned for blasphemy against Islam.
The King Never Smiles (2006)	Paul M. Handley	2006	Biography	Banned in Thailand for its criticism of King Bhumibol Adulyadej.
Rama X: The Thai Monarchy under King Vajiralongkorn (2006)	Pavin Chachavalpongpun	2024	Biography	Banned in Thailand for its criticism of King Vajiralongkorn.

== Uganda ==
Title	Author(s)	Year published	Type	Notes
The Greedy Barbarian	Kakwenza Rukirabashaija	2020	Novel	Satirical novel which describes high-level corruption in a fictional country.
Betrayed By My Leader	John Kazoora	2012	Memoir	Kazoora provides insight into the events that led to the severance of ties with President Museveni and the National Resistance Movement.

== United Arab Emirates ==
Title	Author(s)	Year published	Type	Notes
Animal Farm	George Orwell	1945	Political novella	In 2002, the novel was banned in the schools of the United Arab Emirates, because it contained text or images that would go against Islamic values, most notably an anthropomorphic, talking pig as the leader of the farm. However, the ban is no longer enforced and has been recently lifted.
Goat Days	Benyamin & Joseph Koyippally	2008	Novel	

== United Kingdom ==
Title	Author(s)	Year published	Year banned	Year unbanned	Type	Notes
Areopagitica	John Milton	1644		1695	Essay	Banned in the Kingdom of England for political reasons.
Fanny Hill or Memoirs of a Woman of Pleasure	John Cleland	1748	1749	1970	Novel	Banned in the UK until after the Second World War.
Rights of Man	Thomas Paine	1791	1792	Pre-1990 *Unknown*	Political theory	Banned in the UK and author charged with treason for supporting the French Revolution.
Despised and Rejected	R. Allatini (under the pseudonym A. T. Fitzroy)	1918		1975	Novel	Banned under the UK's Defence of the Realm Act for criticizing Britain's involvement in World War I, and for sympathetically depicting male homosexuality.
Ulysses (1922)	James Joyce	1922		1936	Novel	Banned in the UK until 1936.
Lady Chatterley's Lover (1928)	D. H. Lawrence	1928		1960	Novel	Banned in the United Kingdom for violation of obscenity laws; the ban was lifted in 1960.
The Well of Loneliness (1928)	Radclyffe Hall	1928		1949	Novel	Banned in the UK in 1928 for its lesbian theme; republished in 1949.
Boy	James Hanley	1931	1934	1992	Novel	Prosecuted in 1934 after Hanley's publisher Boriswood lost a court case against a charge of obscenity. Reprinted in 1992 by Penguin Books and André Deutsch.
Lolita	Vladimir Nabokov	1955		1959	Novel	Banned for being "obscene".
Last Exit to Brooklyn	Hubert Selby Jr.	1966 (in the UK)	1967	1968	Anthology of short stories	Banned in Soho for frank depictions of taboo subjects, such as drug use, street violence, homosexuality, gender identity and domestic violence.
Spycatcher	Peter Wright	1985		1988	Autobiography	Banned in the UK from 1985 to 1988 for revealing secrets. Wright was a former MI5 intelligence officer and his book was banned before it was even published in 1987.
Lord Horror	David Britton	1990	1991	1992	Novel	Banned in England in 1991 where it was found obscene; it is currently the last book to be banned in the UK. The judge ordered the remaining print run to be destroyed. The ban was lifted in the Appeal Court in July 1992 but the book remains out of print.
The Anarchist Cookbook	William Powell	1971	*Unknown*	*Unknown*	Instructional	Criminal due to containing information useful to terrorists.
Kill or Get Killed	Rex Applegate	1976	*Unknown*	*Unknown*	Instructional	Criminal due to containing information useful to terrorists.
Put 'Em Down. Take 'Em Out. Knife Fighting Techniques From Folsom Prison	Don Pentecost	1988	*Unknown*	*Unknown*	Instructional	Criminal due to containing information useful to terrorists.

== United States ==
Title	Author(s)	Year published	Year unbanned	Type	Notes
The Meritorious Price of Our Redemption (1650)	William Pynchon	1650	*Unknown*	Religious critique	The first book banned in the New World. Pynchon, a prominent leader of the Massachusetts Bay Colony who, in 1636, founded the City of Springfield, Massachusetts, wrote this explicit critique of Puritanism, published in London in 1650. That year, several copies made their way back to the New World. Pynchon, who resided in Springfield, was unaware that his book suffered the New World's first book burning, on the Boston Common. Accused of heresy by the Massachusetts General Court, Pynchon quietly transferred ownership of the Connecticut River Valley's largest land‑holdings to his son, and then suffered indignities as he left the New World for England. It was the first work banned in Boston.
Fanny Hill or Memoirs of a Woman of Pleasure	John Cleland	1748	1959 and 1966	Novel	Banned in the U.S. in 1821 for obscenity, then again in 1963. This was the last book ever banned by the U.S. government. U.S. obscenity laws were overturned in 1959 by the Supreme Court in Kingsley Pictures Corp. v. Regents. See also Memoirs v. Massachusetts.
Candide	Voltaire	1759	1959	Novel	Seized by U.S. Customs in 1930 for obscenity. U.S. obscenity laws were overturned in 1959 by the Supreme Court in Kingsley Pictures Corp. v. Regents.
Uncle Tom's Cabin (1852)	Harriet Beecher Stowe	1852	1865	Novel	Banned in the Confederate States during the Civil War because of its anti‑slavery content.
Elmer Gantry	Sinclair Lewis	1927	1959	Novel	Banned in Boston, Massachusetts, Kansas City, Missouri, Camden, New Jersey, and other U.S. cities, this novel by Sinclair focused on religiosity and hypocrisy in the United States during the 1920s by depicting a preacher (the Reverend Dr. Elmer Gantry) as a protagonist who preferred easy money, alcohol, and "enticing young girls" to saving souls, while converting a traveling tent revival crusade into a profitable and permanent evangelical church and radio empire for his employers. Elmer Gantry was also widely denounced from pulpits across the United States at the time of its initial publication. U.S. obscenity laws were overturned in 1959 by the Supreme Court in Kingsley Pictures Corp. v. Regents.
Lady Chatterley's Lover (1928)	D. H. Lawrence	1928	1959	Novel	Temporarily banned in the United States for violation of obscenity laws; the ban was lifted in 1959.
Tropic of Cancer (1934)	Henry Miller	1934	1964	Novel (fictionalized memoir)	Banned in the U.S. in the 1930s until the early 1960s, seized by US Customs for sexually explicit content and vulgarity. The rest of Miller's work was also banned by the U.S. Also banned in South Africa until the late 1980s.
The Grapes of Wrath (1939)	John Steinbeck	1939	*Unknown*	Novel	Was temporarily banned in many places in the U.S. In the state of California in which it was partially set, it was banned for its alleged unflattering portrayal of residents of the area.
Forever Amber (1944)	Kathleen Winsor	1944	*Unknown*	Novel	Banned in fourteen states in the U.S. Ban was lifted by an appeals court judge.
Memoirs of Hecate County (1946)	Edmund Wilson	1946	1959	Novel	Banned in the state of New York by the Supreme Court.
Howl (1955)	Allen Ginsberg	1955	1957	Poem	Copies of the first edition seized by San Francisco Customs for obscenity in March 1957; after trial, obscenity charges were dismissed.
Naked Lunch (1959)	William S. Burroughs	1959	1966	Novel	Banned by Boston courts in 1962 for obscenity, but that decision was reversed in 1966 by the Massachusetts Supreme Judicial Court.
United States – Vietnam Relations, 1945–1967: A Study Prepared by the Department of Defense (1971)	Robert McNamara and the United States Department of Defense	1971	Injunction lifted in 1971, declassified in 2011	Government study	Also known as the Pentagon Papers. U.S. President Nixon attempted to suspend publication of classified information. The restraint was lifted by the U.S. Supreme Court in a 6–3 decision. See also New York Times Co. v. United States.
The Federal Mafia	Irwin Schiff	1992	Available for free, but denied for sale as deceptive commercial speech, appeal affirmed in 2004.	Non-fiction	An injunction was issued by a US District Court in Nevada under 26 U.S.C. § 7408 against Irwin Schiff and associates Cynthia Neun and Lawrence Cohen against the sale of this book by those persons as the court found that the information it contains is fraudulent.
Operation Dark Heart (2010) – out of print	Army Reserve Lt. Col. Anthony Shaffer	2010	In 2013, 198 of 433 redactions of classified material reinstated. In 2015, testimony to Congress was permitted.	Memoir	In September 2010, the United States Department of Defense (DoD) overrode the Army's January approval for publication. The DoD then purchased and destroyed all 9,500 first edition copies, citing concerns that it contained classified information which could damage national security. The publisher, St. Martin's Press, in conjunction with the DoD created a second, redacted edition; which contains blacked out words, lines, paragraphs, and portions of the index.

== Uruguay ==
Title	Author(s)	Year published	Type	Notes
The Open Veins of Latin America	Eduardo Galeano	1971	Non‑fiction	

== Uzbekistan ==
Title	Author(s)	Year published	Type	Notes
Works	Hamid Ismailov	–	Novels, poems, journalist writing	Author in exile since 1994 and all his works are banned for being critical of the government.
La İlahe İllallah Ne Demek Biliyor musun?	Faruk Furkan	-	Religious, islam	Contains ideas of extremism and terrorism
Demokratiya - bu dindir!	Abu Muhammad Maqdisiy	-	Religious, islam	Contains ideas of extremism and terrorism

== Vietnam ==
Title	Author(s)	Year published	Type	Notes
Animal Farm	George Orwell	1945	Political commentary	Vietnamese translations are banned on the grounds of "promoting false socialism ideology"
Nineteen Eighty-Four	George Orwell	1949	Political novella	The book was unable to get certification for publication, thus making it banned in Vietnam.
Mourning Headband for Hue: An Account of the Battle for Hue, Vietnam 1968 (Một lần nhân vật Mậu Thân trong "Giải Khăn Sô Cho Huế")	Nhã Ca	1969	Non-fiction	The book was banned for its criticism of the actions of the national liberation front and for acknowledging the 1968 Huế massacre
Paradise of the Blind	Dương Thu Hương	1988	Novel, Literary fiction	Banned in Vietnam for criticism on the political party in control.
No Man's Land	Dương Thu Hương	2005	Novel, Literary fiction	Banned in Vietnam for criticism of the Vietnamese Communist Party.
Politics for Everyone (Chính Trị Bình Dân)	Phạm Đoan Trang	2017	Non-fiction	Banned in Vietnam on the grounds of political sensitivity.
The Road To Serfdom	Friedrich Hayek	1944	Political philosophy	Banned due to criticism of the socialist state, especially the planned economy which would inevitably lead to totalitarianism.
A Tale for 2000 (Chuyện Kể Năm 2000)	Bùi Ngọc Tuấn	2000	Political commentary	The author talked about his experience being imprisoned in a "Vietnamese Gulag" for "Anti-revolutionary propaganda" The book was banned with all copies ordered to be destroyed following the Decision No. 395 Regulation of the then Ministry of Culture and Information for violating Clauses 1 and 2 of the Article 33, Publishing Law which prohibits works criticising the Vietnamese Communist Party and propaganda going against the interests of the state.
The Winning Side (Bên Thắng Cuộc)	Huy Đức	2012	Non-fiction	Due to publications within Vietnam had refused to publish, the author decided to print himself and released it on Amazon. Although it has not been officially banned, the Vietnamese government had seized and question those who had them. This book was considered to be significant as it has provided insights that scholars had never seen before, while it had received a lot of criticism from Vietnamese state media.
A Dusty Wind (Một Cơn Gió Bụi)	Trần Trọng Kim	2017	Biography, political commentary	Banned in Vietnam for being "inappropriate, not objective, and containing unverified information" thus violating the Vietnamese Publishing Law, which tends to happen to the biographies of historical characters deemed to be "controversial" (Note: Historical characters deemed "controversial" by the Communist Party of Vietnam tend to be those who are affiliated with the State of Vietnam.) by the government.
A Handbook of How to Support Prisoners of Conscience (Cẩm nang nuôi tù)	Phạm Đoan Trang	2019	Non-fiction	Banned in Vietnam on the grounds of political sensitivity.
Politics of the police state	Phạm Đoan Trang	2019	Non-fiction	Banned in Vietnam on the grounds of political sensitivity.
Dong Tam report (Báo Cáo Đồng Tâm)	Phạm Đoan Trang	2020	Non-fiction	Banned in Vietnam on the grounds of political sensitivity. The book tell story about families killed by the Vietnamese State in land dispute.
Thời của thánh thần	Hoàng Minh Tường	2008	Novel	Banned in Vietnam on the grounds of political sensitivity.
Nguyên khí	Hoàng Minh Tường	2014	Novel	Banned in Vietnam on the grounds of political sensitivity.
Những mảnh rồng	Hoàng Minh Tường	2016	Novel	Banned in Vietnam on the grounds of political sensitivity.
Thế lực thù địch	Hoàng Minh Tường	2020	Novel	Banned in Vietnam on the grounds of political sensitivity.
Safeguard defenders: Crime must be punished. How to use Magnitsky law to punish human rights violators. (Tội ác phải bị trừng phạt. Hướng dẫn dùng luật Magnitsky để trừng phạt kẻ vi phạm nhân quyền.)	Phạm Đoan Trang	2020	Non-fiction	Banned in Vietnam on the grounds of political sensitivity.

== Yugoslavia ==
Title	Author(s)	Year published	Type	Notes
The Nickel‑Plated-Feet Gang During the Occupation (Les Pieds nickelés dans le maquis)	Successors of Louis Forton	1879–1934	Comic book	Banned in Yugoslavia by court order in 1945.
About a Silence in Literature	Živorad Stojković		Essay	Banned in Yugoslavia by court order in 1951.
The New Class: An Analysis of the Communist System (1957)	Milovan Đilas	1957		Banned in Yugoslavia by court order in 1957; author sentenced for enemy propaganda to seven years in prison, prolonged to 13 years in 1962.
Curved River	Živojin Pavlović	1963	Story collection	In 1963 in Yugoslavia withdrawn by the publisher (Nolit) at request of SDB officials.
Dictionary of Modern Serbo-Croatian Language	Miloš Moskovljević		Dictionary	Banned in Yugoslavia by court order in 1966, at request of Mirko Tepavac, because "some definitions can cause disturbance among citizens".
A Message to Man and Humanity	Aleksandar Cvetković			Banned in Yugoslavia by court order in 1967 for "false and wicked claims, and enemy propaganda that supports pro-Chinese politics".
On Fierce Wound – Fierce Herb	Ratko Zakić			Withdrawn from sales and destroyed after the decision of the Municipal Committee of the League of Communists of Kraljevo in Kraljevo, Yugoslavia in 1967.
Thoughts of a Corpse	Prvoslav Vujčić		Poems	Banned in Yugoslavia by court order in 1983; republished in 2004.
Storytellers II	Boško Novaković		Short stories	Withdrawn from print in Yugoslavia in 1964 because it contained stories by Dragiša Vasić.
Castration of the Wind	Prvoslav Vujčić		Poems	Written in Tuzla prison in 1984. Banned in Yugoslavia by court order in 1984; republished in 2005.

== See also ==
- Censorship by country
- Criticism of Amazon
- Areopagitica; A speech of Mr. John Milton for the Liberty of Unlicenc'd Printing, to the Parliament of England
- Book burning
- Burning of books and burying of scholars
- Challenge (literature)
- Index Librorum Prohibitorum
- List of authors and works on the Index Librorum Prohibitorum
- International Freedom of Expression Exchange
- Internet censorship
- List of banned films
- List of banned video games
- List of book burning incidents
- Television censorship
