= Book censorship in China =

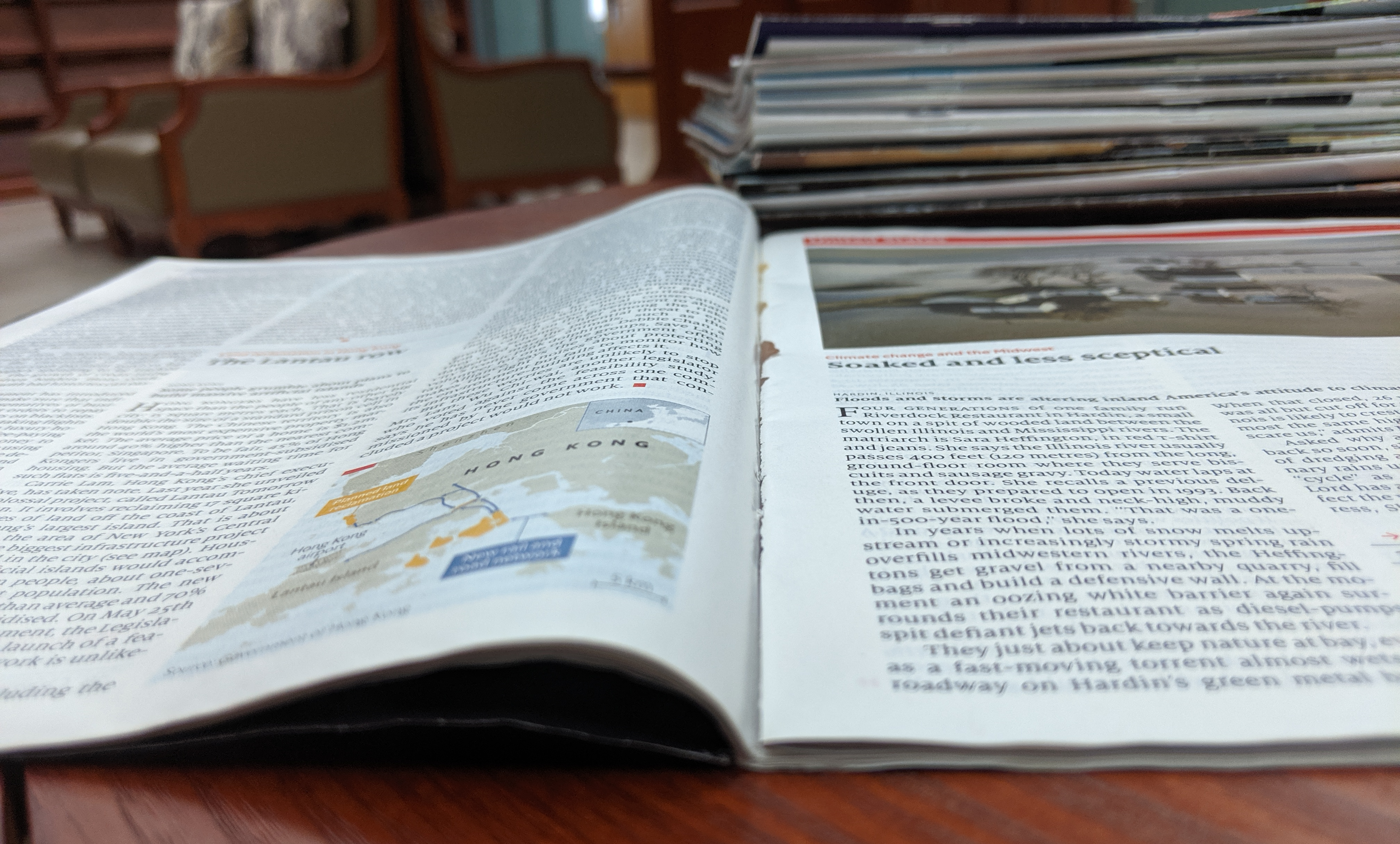
A The Economist magazine (1st issue June 1, 2019) whose content related to the 1989 Tiananmen Square protests and massacre was torn out

Book censorship in the People's Republic of China (PRC) is mandated by the PRC's sole ruling party, the Chinese Communist Party (CCP), and is currently widespread in China. Enforcement is strict and sometimes inconsistent. Punishment for violations can be arbitrary, often leading to long sentences for crimes against censorship laws.

The CCP and the government have historically been sensitive to any opinions on the politics and history of China and its leaders that differ from currently sanctioned opinions.

In the 2010s, book censorship intensified and spread from mainland China to Hong Kong. The CCP's handling of the censorship of media and literature has been scrutinized by countries and groups around the world. The CCP's actions have also resulted in actions of defiance in mainland China, Hong Kong, and Taiwan.

== History ==
Book censorship is a method of censorship which has been employed in China since the start of the Qin dynasty (221 to 206 BC). Both domestic and foreign books which do not meet the central government's requirement will be censored and forbidden to be published.

=== Qin Shi Huang ===
In 213 BCE, the government of ancient China waged a book censorship campaign which is called the "burning of books and burying of scholars".

=== Qianlong Emperor ===
In the 18th century Qing dynasty, the Qianlong Emperor (reigned 1735–1796) asked his officials to censor books published in the 17th century which contained any anti-dynastic or heterodox thoughts. All of these books were burned to purportedly prevent them from having a negative impact on the next generation's thoughts.

=== Mao Zedong ===
After winning the Chinese Civil War, the Chairman of the Chinese Communist Party, Mao Zedong, introduced many new laws concerning censorship in China. In his paper, "The Value of Intellectual Freedom in Twenty-First-Century China: Changes, Challenges, and Progress", Raymond Pun, a professor and researcher at the Alder Graduate School of Education, states that the CCP "maintained a political censorship that can be understood in three ways: 'to retain power, to maintain community standards and to protect dogma—in this case, Maoist dogma'". This dogma began immediately after 1949 and culminated in the 1950s and 60s, during the Cultural Revolution, in which books identified as anti-Communist and anti-Maoist were censored and banned. During this time, public book burnings also became a tool which was used to destroy all literature which was not deemed appropriate by the CCP. By the end of the Cultural Revolution, only a few books were deemed acceptable by the CCP, including classic works by Karl Marx, Friedrich Engels, Vladimir Lenin, and Joseph Stalin, books written by Mao Zedong and Lu Xun, a few political readings, and Revolutionary opera books. Books beyond this scope were all banned from selling and borrowing. In 1971, there were only 46 state-owned publishing houses. Students who wanted to see these censored books circulated handwritten, string-bound copies among their classmates.

=== Xi Jinping ===
Like Mao Zedong, Xi Jinping has continued many of the practices put in place to censor media and literature by the Cultural Revolution. Xi Jinping (November 15, 2012 – present), current CCP General Secretary, has continued to ban books in mainland China and Hong Kong that are considered "politically incorrect". Like Mao, Xi has specifically targeted libraries to censor pro-democracy books and textbooks used in schools, all to promote "patriotism and ideological purity in the education system".

In 2019, Xi Jinping came under fire for resuming the practice of burning books, when a library was caught by the local press burning books in North Western China. Laws put in place by Xi's Ministry of Education gave libraries permission to "cleanse" books that promoted "incorrect global outlook and values," leading to book burnings around China. In 2023, the Chinese government began banning Mongolian language textbooks and publications. Books banned for the general populace are increasingly also banned for high-ranking CCP cadres.

== Mainland China ==
As well as censoring the publication of such books within China and encouraging self censorship, the importation and dissemination of such material is often severely punished and circulation by the way of online files is strictly controlled. Over time China has banned dozens of books, all with their own reasons. (see below in the List of banned books section). Book types that are typically banned are as follows: Books about Chinese modern politics, biographies of former leaders. Books about the lives of or allegations concerning current leaders - these are particularly sensitive topics. Books concerning Tibet and Xinjiang that do less than fully endorse that these have always and will always be part of China. Books about the Dalai Lama, about the 1989 Tiananmen Square protests and massacre or the events of the Cultural Revolution. Books about the Falun Gong religious movement, and other religious books which may contradict government endorsed theology, including some editions of the Holy Bible. Books of allegorical fiction that obliquely criticize the Chinese government.

Censorship in mainland China also extends from political topics into social taboos. The CCP has made strict regulations on books that have explicit descriptions of sex, like extramarital sex.

China's state-run General Administration of Press and Publication (新闻出版总署) (GAPP) screens all Chinese literature that is intended to be sold on the open market. The GAPP has the legal authority to screen, censor, and ban any print, electronic, or Internet publication in China. Because all publishers in China are required to be licensed by the GAPP, that agency also has the power to deny people the right to publish, and completely shut down any publisher who fails to follow its dictates. Consequently, the ratio of official-to-unlicensed books is said to be 40%:60%. According to a report in ZonaEuropa, there are more than 4,000 underground publishing factories around China. The Chinese government continues to hold public book burnings on unapproved literature or books that have since fallen out of favor with CCP elites.

Some banned books are distributed to CCP leaders in limited circulation, so they can have a better understanding of the outside world. These books are marked for internal use (內部) i.e. they can only be used by the party.

The PRC has also tried to follow the Soviet model, by introducing state-run publishing houses for books in an attempt to keep a tight hold on what can and cannot be shown to the public. This model forces publishing houses to get approval from the PRC's government before they can publish books, making the publication of them a long and arduous process for the publishers, further restricting the flow of information.

Even though book censorship is widespread across mainland China, censorship is a negotiable process. In 2019, Amy Hawkins and Jeffrey Wasserstrom of The Atlantic claimed that authorities no longer had as much of a focus on censoring books as a declining number of people read, and that there is more concern for censoring products for mass consumption. They stated this explains why the book versions of Animal Farm and Nineteen Eighty-Four are available in mainland China, but added that all references to Mao Zedong have been removed from Nineteen Eighty-Four.

In 2020, Edmund Burke's Reflections on the Revolution in France was censored along with works by conservative writers such as Albert Jay Nock, James Stephen, Joseph de Maistre, Richard M. Weaver, William F. Buckley Jr., Russell Kirk, and Mario Vargas Llosa. Thomas Piketty's book Capital and Ideology was censored in China for analyzing inequality in the country.

In 2021, the Ministry of Education of the People's Republic of China announced a ban on books in school libraries that engage in "Western veneration".

== Hong Kong ==
Compared to mainland China, publishing in Hong Kong historically remained less censored. Publishers such as New Century Press freely publish books, including lurid fictional accounts, about Chinese officials and forbidden episodes of Chinese history. Banned material including imported material such as that published by Mirror Books of New York City are sold in bookshops such as "People's Commune bookstore" patronized by shoppers from the mainland. Nowadays, as more and more mainland tourists travel to Hong Kong, the central government tends to have a greater control over the book publication. There are more book store closures and less willing publishers. Bookshops in Hong Kong have been making changes of what they sell and those books generally have less coverage over political, religious, and other sensitive issues disliked by the central government. This can be regarded as a kind of self-censorship or soft censorship. In 2018, some Hong Kong booksellers who trafficked banned books were found missing. Some independent publishers in Hong Kong who sell politically sensitive books hide those forbidden books behind a counter or rent their bookstores on higher floors in some commercial buildings where few people know them. After the passage of the Hong Kong national security law in 2020, libraries began removing sensitive books.

Over time, people have found different ways to reintroduce banned books into Hong Kong. One of the most famous examples is the Hong Kong book fair, in which thousands of Hong Kong, Mainland, and Taiwanese citizens come to buy censored books unattainable in mainland China.

== Responses to banned books ==
In 2015, 12 American publishers, including Penguin Random House, Macmillan Publishers, and W. W. Norton & Company, signed a pledge to oppose the Chinese government's censorship targeting foreign authors' works. Many foreign authors found that some of their books' content had been removed, without their knowledge, during its translation into Chinese. Some authors did not fully understand how Chinese censorship actually worked, so they just signed contracts stating the insurance of their original content without double-checking whether the translated version had any changes to content. Most expurgated content was related to political sensitivities or political incorrectness.

In 2017, publishers at a book fair held in Beijing exercised self-censorship by avoiding selling books related with sensitive topics, such as 1989 Tiananmen Square protests, Tibetan sovereignty debate and political status of Taiwan so as to adapt to one of the largest book publishing markets in the world. In the same year, the Chinese government asked Cambridge University Press to block online access to more than 300 articles which contained political sensitivities from The China Quarterly. Many scholars signed a petition to call upon Cambridge University Press to oppose against the Chinese government's censorship request so as to ensure academic and publication freedom. The Chinese government has also imposed restrictions on the access to foreign children's books since they believed that children should be more in touch with books reflecting Chinese values.

In 2018, the editors of the Transcultural Research Book Series ended their cooperation with Springer Nature which imposed restrictions on access to more than 1,000 political science journal articles in China. If the content books or journals do not fit the Propaganda Department of the Chinese Communist Party's agenda, those books will be banned from publication and selling.

Countries have responded in different ways to the CCP's censorship efforts. In January 2018, the Swedish government issued multiple statements regarding the disappearance of a Swedish book publisher, Gui Minhai, in China. NPR reported on Sweden's response to China, where a back and forth between the two countries concerning the freedom of the Swedish publisher ensued.

Many organizations around the world have also come out with statements against the CCP's actions. In 2018, Summer Lopez, senior director at PEN America (an organization focused on the protection of the freedom of speech), came out with a statement concerning the CCP's actions with Gui Minhai, stating that "China's treatment of publisher Gui Minhai — a story of abduction, detention, and now denial of medical care — demonstrates flagrant disregard for the rule of law and human rights".

With pressure on Taiwanese book publishers from the CCP's government, many have turned towards self censorship just like in Hong Kong, removing all materials concerning vulgar or politically detrimental content. Taiwanese books which are about democracy, protests and human rights are blacklisted in China.

== List of censored books ==
Title	Author	Type	Notes
Jane Eyre (1847)	Amy Corzine and Charlotte Brontë	Novel	Jane Eyre was censored because the CCP deemed it socially corrupting to the youth of China during the Cultural Revolution.
Alice's Adventures in Wonderland (1865)	Lewis Carroll	Children's Novel/Adventure	Alice's Adventures in Wonderland was banned in the province of Hunan, China by the KMT's government, beginning in 1931, due to its portrayal of anthropomorphized animals which act with the same level of complexity as human beings. The censor General Ho Chien believed that attributing human language to animals was an insult to humans. He feared that the book would teach children to believe that humans and animals were on the same level, a result which would be "disastrous."
Various works	Shen Congwen	Novels	"Denounced by the Communists and Nationalists alike, Mr. Shen saw his writings banned in Taiwan, while mainland [China] publishing houses burned his books and destroyed printing plates for his novels. .... So successful was the effort to erase Mr. Shen's name from the modern literary record that few younger Chinese today recognize his name, much less the breadth of his work. Only since 1978 has the Chinese Government reissued selections of his writings, although in editions of only a few thousand copies. .... In China, his passing was unreported."
Life and Death in Shanghai (1986)	Nien Cheng	Autobiography	It is about the author's personal tortured experience during the Cultural Revolution.
Soul Mountain (1989)	Gao Xingjian	Novel	Gao Xingjian won the 2000 Nobel Prize in Literature for the book, however all of his works have been banned for having content critical of the CCP.
White Snow, Red Blood (1989)	Zhang Zhenglong	Non-fiction novel	Banned in 1990, and both the author and publishers were imprisoned for publishing it. The book includes information about atrocities committed by the Red Army during the siege of Changchun, the smuggling of opium by senior Party leader Wang Zhen during the Chinese Civil War, and claims that China's official description of the Lin Biao affair is inaccurate.
Wild Swans: Three Daughters of China (1991)	Jung Chang	Family history	It talked about brutal political upheavals in China and purges of the Cultural Revolution.
Yellow Peril (1991)	Wang Lixiong	Novel	Banned. The book contains episodes of a fictional collapse of Chinese communist rule.
Zhuan Falun (1993)	Li Hongzhi	Spiritual/Political	Banned in mainland China.
The Private Life of Chairman Mao (1994)	Li Zhisui	Memoir	Banned for exploring Mao's private life.
One Man's Bible (1999)	Gao Xingjian	Novel	All of Gao Xingjian's works have been banned for having content critical of the CCP.
How the Red Sun Rose: The Origins and Development of the Yan'an Rectification Movement, 1930-1945 (2000)	Gao Hua	History	Banned for exploring in detail Mao Zedong in the Yan'an Rectification and the internal struggles of the CCP.
Shanghai Baby (2001)	Wei Hui	Semi-autobiographical novel	Banned. Burned in the street and the publisher was shut down for three months because of its sexual and drug-related content, which has been accused of being "immoral" by the government. Other writers have accused the book of plagiarism.
The Tiananmen Papers (2001)	Compiled by Zhang Liang	Compilation of selected Chinese official documents	Controversy about this book include authenticity of selected documents and selection bias.
Candy (2003)	Mian Mian	Novel	Chinese government censored it because it was "a poster child for spiritual pollution".
Death Note (2003 – 2006)	Tsugumi Ohba	Japanese Manga	Officially banned, but discussion and pirated copies are allowed to circulate.
Zhou Enlai: The Last Perfect Revolutionary (2003 or 2008)	Gao Wenqian	Biography	Banned in China.
Buying a Fishing Rod for My Grandfather (2004)	Gao Xingjian	Short story collections	All of Gao Xingjian's works have been banned for having content critical of the CCP.
I Love My Mum (2004)	Chen Xiwo	Political	A novella in which the relationship between Chinese citizens and their government are metaphorically portrayed as a cognitively impaired man in extreme sexual situations with their mother.
Will the Boat Sink the Water (2004)	Chen Guidi and Wu Chuntao	Academic study	Banned for exploring peasant protests. Sold an estimated 7 million pirated copies, despite being almost immediately banned by China's propaganda department.
Mao: The Unknown Story (2005)	Jung Chang and Jon Halliday	Political	Banned due to depicting Chairman Mao Zedong as a fascist leader against his people. Book reviews have also been banned.
Lingren Wangshi (2005)	Zhang Yihe	Non-fiction	The book, which documents the experiences of Peking Opera artists during the Anti-Rightist Campaign and the Cultural Revolution, was banned by the General Administration of Press and Publication in 2007.
Dream of Ding Village (2006)	Yan Lianke	Novel	Banned for discussing AIDS in rural China (Plasma Economy), the ban had reportedly been lifted.
Highschool of the Dead (2006 – 2013)	Daisuke Satō and Shōji Satō	Japanese Manga	Banned for the purpose of protecting "the healthy development of youth".
Serve the People! (2008)	Yan Lianke	Novel	Banned for "slandering Mao Zedong", and depicting images of sex.
Tombstone: The Great Chinese Famine, 1958-1962 (2008)	Yang Jisheng	History	Published in Hong Kong, banned for discussing the Great Chinese Famine.
Attack on Titan (2009 – 2021)	Hajime Isayama	Japanese Manga	Banned for the purpose of protecting "the healthy development of youth".
Big River, Big Sea — Untold Stories of 1949 (2009)	Lung Ying-tai	Non-Fiction	It sold over 100,000 copies in Taiwan and 10,000 in Hong Kong in its first month of release, but discussion of her work was banned in mainland China following the book launch.
Prisoner of the State (2009)	Zhao Ziyang	Memoir	Banned. The book is memoirs by former Chinese General Secretary Zhao Ziyang.
China's Best Actor: Wen Jiabao (2010)	Yu Jie	Political	Published in Hong Kong and banned in mainland China. Author moved to the United States in 2012.
Tokyo Ghoul (2011 – 2014)	Sui Ishida	Japanese Manga	Banned for containing violent and indecent criminal scenes.
Bloody Myth: An Account of the Cultural Revolution Massacre of 1967 in Daoxian, Hunan (血的神话: 公元1967年湖南道县文革大屠杀纪实) (2012)	Tan Hecheng	Non-fiction	An account of murders in a rural district of China during Mao Zedong's Cultural Revolution. Banned for 26 years and released in 2012.
Reverend Insanity (2012–2019)	Gu Zhen Ren	Web novel / Xianxia	Removed from major Chinese online platforms following a government ban in mainland China, as the work was deemed to promote unhealthy values of violence, cruelty, and extreme individualism.
Moving Away from the Imperial Regime (2015)	Qin Hui	Political	Banned. The book explores the unfulfilled promise of constitutional democracy, and another historian suggests that it may have been banned because the topic deals with the Chinese dynastic cycle.
Capital and Ideology (2019)	Thomas Piketty	Economy	Banned for discussing China's income inequality and for refusing to accept censorship for a planned translation.
Unfree Speech: The Threat to Global Democracy and Why We Must Act, Now (2020)	Joshua Wong	Political	Censored due to inciting secession. Taken out of libraries because of the Hong Kong national security law.
The Chongzhen Emperor: Diligent Ruler of a Failed Dynasty (2023)	Chen Wutong	History	Censored due to popular comparisons between the final emperor of the Ming dynasty, the Chongzhen Emperor, and Xi Jinping.

== See also ==
- Censorship in China
- List of books banned by governments
- Book censorship in Hong Kong
