= Zhang Liang =

Zhang Liang is the romanization of common names like 張良, 張亮 and 張梁.

== 張良 ==
- Zhang Liang (Western Han) (died 189 BC), early Han dynasty strategist
  - Zhang Liang, an animation character from the animated TV series The Legend of Qin, based on the above
- Zhang Liang (film director), (born 1933), film director and actor.
- Zhang Liang (author), pseudonym for the author of The Tiananmen Papers

== 張亮 ==
- Zhang Liang (Tang dynasty) (died 646), general of the Tang dynasty
- Zhang Liang (rower) (born 1987), Chinese rower
- Zhang Liang (cyclist) (born 1983), Chinese Olympic racing cyclist

== 張梁 ==
- Zhang Chenliang (born 1998), Chinese footballer, formerly known as Zhang Liang
- Zhang Liang (2nd-century–184), a Yellow Turban leader, Zhang Jue's brother
