= Censorship of the iTunes Store =

Restriction of access to iTunes Store content by governments and organizations

Censorship of the iTunes Store refers to external attempts at blocking access to digital content distributed through the iTunes Store.

== Australia ==
In 2010, the Australian Labor Party announced its intent to subject the 220,000 mobile apps available on the Australia App Store to Australian Classification Board regulations, which require that developers pay evaluation fees ranging from $470 to $2040. A 2011 article in the Sydney Morning Herald clarified that "Australians will soon be able to complain about mobile game apps they take offence to and get them removed from app stores such as Apple's iTunes if they're deemed 'refused classification'. And if mobile game apps are classified anything above MA15+ and the government doesn't introduce an R18+ games classification (which it plans to vote on in July), then any game app rated over MA15+ will also be refused classification." Sentiments were also expressed over other apps: "What is unclear, however, is how the Classification Board will classify apps that aren't necessarily games like Grindr, an app for gay users which uses [GPS] to find nearby males."

== China ==
The China App Store was affected by connection-level censorship until an unknown point in time when Apple enabled a HTTPS-by-default configuration. Searches for 'VPN', for example, would cause the connection to be reset.

The Ministry of Industry and Information Technology said on 13 December 2012 that it planned to strengthen regulation of China's mobile applications market. The Shanghai-based IT Times quoted Chen Jinqiao as saying that the plans included "[bringing] app developers under supervision and [establishing] a real-name registration system for independent developers.

In 2013, Apple pulled several apps from the China App Store for containing books banned by the government. Several apps enabling users to bypass the Great Firewall and access restricted sites in China were also removed later. The Apple News application bundled with iOS 9 is disabled in China for all users as well, of which all contents, including the articles already downloaded to the device, are not available to read in China.

Apple's iBooks and iTunes Movies, available in China since September 2015, were both shut down in China in April 2016, less than seven months after the launch. The services were disabled by the State Administration of Press, Publication, Radio, Film and Television of China after the authority introduced regulations imposing strict curbs on online publishing, particularly for foreign firms. Apple said in response that they hope to restore the services in China "as soon as possible".
