= Unfree Speech: The Threat to Global Democracy and Why We Must Act, Now =

2020 political memoir by Joshua Wong with Jason Y. Ng

- First edition (WH Allen, 2020)
- Author: Joshua Wong with Jason Y. Ng
- Language: English
- Subject: Hong Kong politics; democracy
- Genre: Memoir; political manifesto
- Publisher: WH Allen (UK); Penguin Books (US)
- Publication date: 2020
- Publication place: United Kingdom
- Pages: 288
- ISBN: 978-0-7535-5479-1

Unfree Speech: The Threat to Global Democracy and Why We Must Act, Now is a 2020 political memoir by Hong Kong activist Joshua Wong, written with lawyer and columnist Jason Y. Ng and introduced by Ai Weiwei. The book combines Wong's account of his political development with letters written during imprisonment and an argument for international action in defence of democracy. It was published in the United Kingdom by WH Allen on 6 February 2020 and in the United States by Penguin Books on 18 February 2020.

In July 2020, shortly after the imposition of the Hong Kong national security law, Hong Kong public libraries made the book unavailable while reviewing titles under the legislation.

== Contents ==
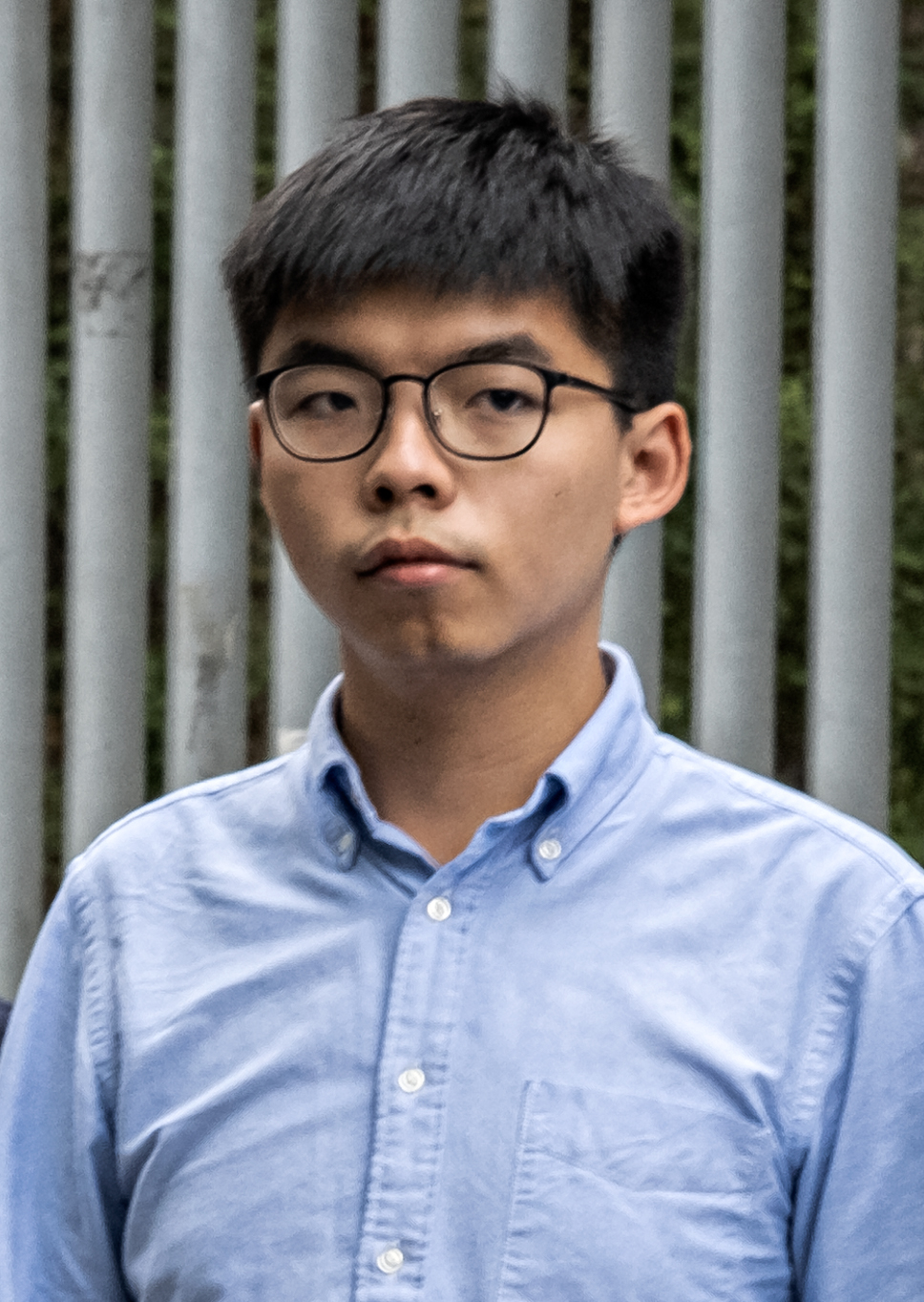
Joshua Wong in 2019

The publisher describes the book as having three parts. The first follows Wong's path from school activism to his role in the Umbrella Movement and the founding of Demosistō. The second collects letters he wrote while imprisoned, and the third presents a manifesto urging readers outside Hong Kong to defend democratic institutions and freedoms.

Wong's narrative begins with his childhood and education in Hong Kong. It describes the school-based campaign against the proposed moral and national education curriculum, the growth of Scholarism, and the protests of 2014. It then turns to the prosecution and imprisonment of activists, Wong's Christian beliefs, and his view that Hong Kong's political situation has implications beyond the territory. The final section recommends practical forms of civic participation, including following political developments, checking information and taking part in organising and election campaigns.

== Reception ==
Reviewing the book for The Observer, Tim Adams called it "a call to arms for the Snapchat generation". He treated it as both a memoir of an unusually eventful decade and a manual for political participation. Adams found the prison-letter section less fluent in places, describing parts of the second half as having the flattened tone of a court report or legal document, but emphasised the book's insistence that democratic action begins with small acts.

In The Guardian, Julia Lovell described the book as a memoir and "fervent call to arms". She praised Wong's avoidance of individual grandstanding and his emphasis on the people of Hong Kong, while also discussing the book's sharp distinction between democratic Hong Kong and mainland China. Lovell cautioned that activists should not demonise China or its people, and said that Wong's long-term influence was difficult to assess while the political situation remained unresolved. She nevertheless concluded that his "tenacious dynamism" made the book a guide to mobilising for democracy and representation.

== Library review ==
On 30 June 2020, China's national security legislation for Hong Kong came into force. Within days, books by Wong and other pro-democracy figures disappeared from public-library catalogues or were marked unavailable. Reuters reported that a search for Wong's books, including Unfree Speech, returned results describing them as unavailable or under review. The Leisure and Cultural Services Department said that it would review whether particular books violated the legislation and would seek legal advice; during that process, the books would not be available for borrowing or reference.

Wong characterised the development as censorship, while Hong Kong and mainland officials said that the legislation targeted a small number of offenders and would not curtail freedom of speech or the press.

== Editions ==
The British WH Allen edition, with ISBN 978-0-7535-5479-1, was published on 6 February 2020; the US Penguin Books paperback, ISBN 978-0-14-313571-5, followed on 18 February 2020. WH Allen issued an electronic edition (ISBN 978-0-7535-5480-7) and Penguin Audio an unabridged recording narrated by Dexter Galang (ISBN 978-0-593-28588-6), both on their respective release dates. The two markets used different jackets: the British edition printed the title in cream capitals crossed out by pink strokes, while the American edition used a photograph of Wong carried through a crowd of reporters.

== See also ==
- Book censorship in China
- Censorship in Hong Kong
- Joshua: Teenager vs. Superpower
