= The Tale of Seol Gongchan =

Korean novel written before 1511

Seol Gongchan-jeon (Korean: 설공찬전; Hanja: 薛公瓚傳; lit. 'Tale of Seol Gongchan') is a novel written by Chae Su (蔡壽, 1449–1515) before 1511. It is about a person possessed by the spirit of a dead person who tells the story of the underworld. In the sixth year in the reign of King Jungjong (1511), this novel was classified as a book that confuses and misleads people and burned by the king's decree, and its author Chae Su was dismissed from office.

== Authorship ==
Seol Gongchan-jeon was written by Chae Su, a civil official of the Joseon Dynasty, before 1511. Chae Su's ja, or familiar name, is Giji (耆之), ho, or brush-name, is Najae (懶齋), and siho, or temple name, is Yangjeong (襄靖). He was born as the eldest son of Cha Sinbo (蔡申報) and his wife Mun Hwaryu in Seoul, Korea, in the 31st year of the reign of King Sejong (1449).

In the 14th year in the reign of King Sejo (1468), Chae Su passed saengwonsi, a “classics licentiate” civil service examination, received the highest passing mark in the regular literary civil service examinations held every three years, known as singnyeonsi, in the first year in the reign of King Yejong (1469), and became an inspector at the Office of Inspector-General. In the first year in the reign of King Seongjong (1470), he became the sixth counselor in the Office of Royal Decrees and later the fifth counselor in the Ministry of Punishments. He was also involved in the compilation of the Sejo sillok (Annals of King Sejo) and Seongjong sillok (Annals of King Seongjong).

In the 13th year in the reign of King Seongjong (1482), Chae Su became the Chief Justice of the Supreme Court. In the same year, he asserted that Yeonsangun's mother, the deposed Queen Yun (廢妃尹氏) should be given food and a place to live out her life, incurring the king's anger, and ended up resigning from his post.

In 1485, Chae became the governor of Chungcheong Province. After his visits to Ming China as part of the delegations to pay tribute to the Ming Emperor on the occasions of the New Year and the emperor's birthday, he served as the headmaster of Seonggyungwan and eventually became the Second Minister of Taxation (hojo champan). After Yeonsangun rose to the throne, Chae was able to survive the Literary Purge of 1498 by keeping a low profile in the royal court. During the Purge of 1504 in the 10th year in the reign of Yeonsangun, he was framed and exiled in Danseong but was eventually released.

In 1506, he took part in a coup to enthrone King Jungjong and was recorded in history as a meritorious subject who was involved in tranquilizing the state and received the title of Incheongun. That year, Chae resigned from his post and moved to Hamchang, where he built Kwaejaejeong (快哉亭, “pleasant pavilion”) in the following year and retreated from the world. In the sixth year in the reign of King Jungjong (1511), he was impeached for having written Seol Gongchan-jeonand died in Hamchang in the 10th year in the reign of King Jungjong (1515).

== Plot ==
Seol Chungran lived in Sunchang with a son and daughter. His daughter married but died without a child and his son Gongchan also died from illness even before he was wed. Feeling sorry for his son, Seol makes a spirit tablet for his son, mourns him for three years, and buries it next to his grave.

Seol Chungran's younger brother Seol Chungsu has two sons, the first of whom is named Gongchim. On July 7, 1508, Gongchim visits his father. While in the outhouse, he becomes possessed by the spirit of Chungran's dead daughter. Chungsu summons an exorcist named Kim Seoksan who tries to drive out the spirit from Gongchim's body. When the exorcism rite is performed, Chungran's daughter leaves Gongchim, saying that she cannot win against the exorcist as she is a woman and that she will bring her brother Gongchan.

As Gongchan's spirit begins to possess Gongchim's body, Chungsu calls on Kim Seoksan again. Enraged at Chungsu's attempt to drive him away from Gongchim's body, Gongchan transforms Gongchim's body. Horrified, Chungsu swears never to summon Kim again, and Gongchim's body returns to its original state.

Gongchan then sends a letter to his cousins Seolwon and Yun Jasin and tells them about the underworld: 1) The underworld is located by the ocean and about 40 li (approximately 10 miles) from Sunchang; 2) The underworld is called Danwolguk (檀越國) and is ruled by Bisamuncheonwang; 3) When people die, they are whipped by an iron whip and questioned about their lives. They are taken to the underworld if their lives are truly over. Gongchan says he was taken to the underworld but was released thanks to his great-grandfather Seolwi; 4) In the underworld, women can learn to read and write and they can also serve in government posts; 5) People's treatment in the underworld depends on how they lived in this world; 6) Emperor Seonghwa sent his servant Aebagi to King Yeomla and requested that Yeomla prolong the life of his beloved servant by a year. King Yeomla was enraged at the request, and when Emperor Seonghwa came to see Yeomla, Yeomla brought Amugae in and ordered his servants to boil Amugae's hand (The rest of the story is unavailable).

== Features and Significance ==
Seol Gongchan-jeon was banned in the Joseon Dynasty. There are various assumptions about the reason it was banned, one of which is its huge impact when it was published in vernacular Korean and distributed throughout Korea.

As it was published in the 16th century, it is also considered a work that bridges the gap between Geumo sinhwa (金鰲新話Tales of Mount Geumo) written in the 15th century and other novels that were popular in the 17th century. The fact that it was written in Chinese characters but translated into hangeul and published also shows the trend of novels from being written in Chinese characters to vernacular Korean.

As it tells the story of the underworld, Seol Gongchan-jeon was often compared to Namyeombujuji (南炎浮洲志 Records of South Yeombuju) in Geumo sinhwa.

== Other ==
Jiridadopadopa Seol Gongchan-jeon, a play based on Seol Gongchan-jeon, was premiered in 2003. In 2015, Seol Gongchan hwanhonjeon (A Story about the Return of Seol Gongchan's Spirit) was serialized as a web novel on Naver, which is a recreation of the story from Seol Gongchan-jeon.

== Text ==
In 1996, Professor Lee Bokgyu discovered a handwritten version of parts of Seol Gongchan-jeon from the third volume of Mukjae ilgi (Journal entries from 1545 to 1546). The discovery was reported via a newspaper on April 27, 1997, and introduced to the academia. Seol Gongchan-jeon seems to have been written in Chinese characters originally, but due to the government censorship the original version does not exist and the copy that was found in Mukjae ilgi is the only existing copy that remains today.
