= The Tiananmen Papers =

Documents about the Tiananmen Square Massacre

The Tiananmen Papers is a book presented as a compilation of selected secret Chinese official documents relating to the 1989 Tiananmen Square protests and massacre. The documents used in both books are said to have been made available by a Chinese compiler under the pseudonym Zhang Liang, whose identity is hidden to protect the individual from potential persecution. It was first published in English in January 2001 by PublicAffairs. The extended Chinese version of this book was published in April that same year under the title 中國六四真相 (Pinyin: Zhōngguó Liùsì Zhēnxiàng, translated as June Fourth: The True Story) by Mirror Books in Hong Kong. The English version of the book was edited and translated by Andrew J. Nathan, Perry Link, and Orville Schell, who claim to place full trust in the compiler. Speculations about the authenticity of the book have nevertheless been fervent, as the editors were never given the actual physical documents, but rather a reformatted version of the material.

== Contents ==
The Tiananmen Papers combines various government documents with editors' notes and footnotes to illustrate the situation within the Chinese Communist Party surrounding the time of the protests. The documents are arranged in chronological order from April to late June 1989. The book portrays a sense of factionalism and power struggle within the Party, in which the reformist faction is headed by General Secretary Zhao Ziyang and the conservative faction by Premier Li Peng. Zhao appears to have had a conciliatory attitude to the students' demands, deeming the protests to be mostly patriotic. Li had more of a hardline approach, and attempted to convince paramount leader Deng Xiaoping that the protests were causing "turmoil" and that the students were "networking." The book portrays Deng, the most prominent Party elder, as the main decision-maker of the party. Though it appears that he "did not play this role happily", the internal division in the Party required a decision-maker. In the end he sided with the conservative faction and decided to dismiss Zhao, appoint Jiang Zemin as General Secretary to replace Zhao, declare martial law, and clear the square by force.

== Controversy ==
Authenticity and selection bias are two main sources of controversy about the book.

To determine whether the documents presented in the book are authentic is challenging, if not impossible. While a process of authentication would require a comparison of the documents used in The Tiananmen Papers with the original materials, few of these original documents are available. Sinologist Lowell Dittmer, for example, wrote that though "the question of authenticity is key, it is frustratingly difficult to resolve in this case." One of the most ardent critics of the book, professor Alfred L. Chan from Huron University College, has taken this argument even further and claimed that not only is the book partially fictional, it is also "based on open and semi-open" material. This argument not only discredits the reliability of the book but also puts into question the supposed secrecy of the documents presented in it. One of the editors of the book, Andrew Nathan, rejects these claims in a rejoinder and argues not only that the documents are authentic but also that most of the documents are not available anywhere else.

As a definitive validation of The Tiananmen Papers will be possible only through a comparison with the original documents (something that cannot happen unless the compiler reveals his sources or until the Chinese government opens up its archives), the validity of the book cannot be firmly established.

Although Nathan claims the documents are authentic, he acknowledges the potential issues selectivity brings. "The materials in The Tiananmen Papers", he continues, "have gone through a series of processes, each of which brought the final product further away from the raw material of what happened." While the selection bias does not necessarily detract from the assumed authenticity of the book, it might still be biased to some extent in favour of the political agenda of the compiler, if they had one.

In a short review of the book, Fang Lizhi laments that it focuses more on the power struggle within the party rather than the student movement itself. The editors have acknowledged this fact and identified it as arising from the compiler's wish to "spark a reevaluation of what transpired in 1989 and accelerate political liberalization in China".

== Chinese reception ==
The Chinese government has denounced The Tiananmen Papers as fake, and both the Chinese and English versions of the book have been banned in the mainland. One of the editors, Nathan, has been banned from entering China due to his connection with the book.
