= Moving Away from the Imperial Regime =

- First edition (Chinese)
- Author: Qin Hui
- Original title: 走出帝制：从晚清到民国的历史回望
- Publisher: Qunyan Press
- Publication date: October 1, 2015
- OCLC: 1101296683

The Moving Away from the Imperial Regime, or Departing the Imperial Regime, is a collection of historical essays written by Chinese historian Qin Hui, majorly dealing with the topics of modern Chinese history before and after the Xinhai Revolution, and questioning the long-dominant Marxist historiography and the historical view of strengthening the nation in Chinese historiography. The book describes China's tortuous history of constitutional transformation.

With the central theme of the difficulty of China's departing the imperial regime, Moving Away from the Imperial Regime points out that China's second transition (from imperialism to a republican, democratic, and constitutional system since the late Qing Dynasty) is still incomplete after more than one hundred years, and it is difficult to predict when it will succeed. This view in the book provoked the discontent among Chinese book censors and was banned.

== Overview ==
Moving Away from the Imperial Regime is a book about the difficult transition from the last Qing Empire to the early years of the Republic of China. In this book, Qin Hui addresses the issues of China and constitutional democracy after the Xinhai Revolution. It examines why constitutional democracy cannot take root in China and refutes the view that the Chinese cannot accept constitutionalism.

== Published and banned ==
Moving Away from the Imperial Regime was published by Qunyan Press on October 1, 2015, and on November 30 of the same year, the book was banned by the Chinese government.
