= Chen Xiwo =

Chinese writer

Chen Xiwo is the author of the controversial novella I Love My Mum, which remains banned in China. In 2010, Asia Sentinel described Chen Xiwo as 'one of China's most outspoken voices on freedom of expression for writers.' Due to Chen's refusal to compromise about his often controversial writing, however, it was nearly 20 years before his books could be published in China. He now teaches comparative literature at Fuzhou Normal University, and has published seven major novels. After graduating from Fujian Normal University, Chen studied in Japan from 1989 to 1994.

One recurring theme in Chen's fiction is sex, and perhaps his most famous work I Love My Mum (遮蔽), uses incest as a metaphor for a dysfunctional society.

Despite his early difficulties being published in China, Chen's writing has now received widespread recognition there. One of his major novels, Exile, won the eighth HuangChangXian Literature Prize. Other books, including Irritation, which has also been translated into French, helped gain Chen the fourth Fujian Flowers award for outstanding literary works.

== One Man Against the Censors ==
In June 2007, the Fuzhou office of China Customs intercepted the galley proof of author Xiwo's book, which had been mailed to him by his Taiwanese publisher. The collection of Chen's works was quickly deemed 'prohibited' because it contained the banned novella I Love My Mum. Chen launched a legal case against China Customs, and an uproar exploded in the Chinese media at the absurdity of a writer having his own book confiscated. The scandal surrounding I Love My Mum in many ways epitomized a writing career characterized by a refusal to compromise.

== I Love My Mum ==
This is the first English translation of one of Chen's most famous works. I Love My Mum caused an international sensation in 2007 when the author sued Chinese customs after they confiscated the Chinese version. I Love My Mum is a shocking tale of murder and incest narrated by a hardened crime squad detective who is used to the seamy side of life, but had never come across a murder case like the one in the story.

In addition to a full and uncensored translation of I Love My Mum, the book includes a specially written afterword by Chen and an introduction to his life and work.
