= Zhou Enlai: The Last Perfect Revolutionary =

2008 book by Gao Wenqian

- 2008 first edition
- Author: Gao Wenqian
- Language: English (Translated from Chinese (晚年周恩来) by Peter Rand and Lawrence R. Sullivan)
- Genre: Biography
- Publisher: New York: Public Affairs
- Publication date: 2008
- Media type: Print (Hardback)
- Pages: 344
- ISBN: 1-58648-645-4

Zhou Enlai: The Last Perfect Revolutionary is a book written by Gao Wenqian. Before moving to the United States in 1993, Gao had been a researcher at CPC Central Party Literature Research Center, where he penned the official biographies of Zhou Enlai and Mao Zedong. The book was published in 2008 by Public Affair in English. As the book is based on secret and classified Chinese archives, upon emigrating to the United States Gao realized it would not be possible to take all the necessary documents and notes with him, so for a decade he had friends of his in China send and smuggle them out in chunks.

The book is a biography of Zhou Enlai, the Premier of China from 1949 to 1976, one of the most important Chinese leaders of his generation. Zhou is portrayed as "a conflicted, even tragic, figure", succeeding in remaining at the center stage of Chinese politics for fifty years, through the troubled years of the Long March and Cultural Revolution. In 2003 Gao wrote a similar book in Chinese, Zhou Enlai's Later Years (晚年周恩来), using similar research materials.

== Reception ==
The book has been praised for portraying Zhou Enlai as a human, and not a political or ideological icon, by both presenting the man's flaws and his successes. Peter Ritter of Time magazine praises the book for depicting both sides of the Premier; as thoughtful and cultured, yet ultimately obedient to Mao whims, as "an active, if not always enthusiastic, participant". Ritter concludes that Gao's book creates "a conflicted, even tragic, figure". Dong Wang, at the UCLA, shares a similar view, stating that "Mr. Gao's unprecedented work reveals Zhou to be a tragic hero who had a very complex character". Lucian Pye, in Foreign Affairs, credits the book as "further proof of the payoffs of telling the truth about politically sensitive matters" and congratulates it for ultimately helping to "secure a positive memory of Zhou".

The author, Gao Wenqian, has criticized that some of the reception to his book "seem to misread and hence exaggerate the extent to which [he] is critical of Zhou". According to Gao, "his attitude toward Zhou is neither to conceal his faults, nor to excoriate him" and that, "as he himself later revealed, he was quite "sympathetic" toward Zhou".
