= Gao Wenqian =

Chinese human rights advisor

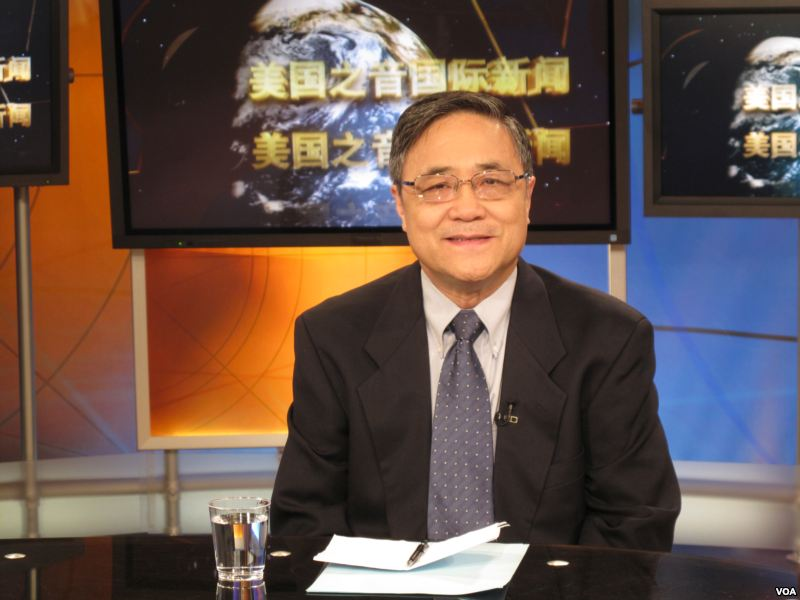
Gao in 2012

Gao Wenqian (simplified Chinese: 高文谦; traditional Chinese: 高文謙; pinyin: Gāo Wénqiān; born 1953 in Beijing) is the Senior Policy Advisor at Human Rights in China.

He was previously a researcher at CPC Central Party Literature Research Center, where he wrote the biographies of Zhou Enlai and Mao Zedong after the Cultural Revolution. Gao witnessed killings by PLA soldiers on 4 June 1989 during the student protest at Tiananmen Square and was deeply moved by this experience. He emigrated to the United States in 1993, where he wrote Zhou Enlai: The Last Perfect Revolutionary in 2007.

As a supporter of democracy in China, Gao believes that the Tiananmen Square protests exposed the Chinese Communist government's "illegitimacy" in governing China, and that the current economic system is responsible for China's social ills.
