= Zhang Liang (author) =

Writer

Zhang Liang is the pseudonym of the compiler of the controversial book The Tiananmen Papers. Zhang has refused to reveal his true identity for fear of repression and retaliation by the Chinese Communist Party (CCP) against him, his family, and his friends. Moreover, Zhang contends that he wants to remain anonymous to avoid being seen as a figurehead or a savior. He believes that the Chinese government is the only entity which can reverse the damaged system One of the only known facts about Zhang is that he is a former high-ranking cadre within the CCP. Some people within China and abroad believe that his unwillingness to reveal his identity immediately discredits the documents and accusations presented in The Tiananmen Papers.

== Motivations for Writing ==
Zhang and some of his pro-reform colleagues had petitioned the Chinese Communist Party to own up to, what they viewed as, its mistakes on June 4, 1989. However, because of the government's unwillingness to change its position regarding its actions during the protests, Zhang felt he had no option but to collect the documents and release them publicly. Following the publishing of his book, Zhang met with CNN for an interview where he divulged that he felt it was his national duty to publish the secret documents and that "what I did, I did for history and for the people." Andrew Nathan and Perry Link, The Tiananmen Papers editors, write that Zhang had further hopes when publishing the material:

[Zhang] hopes that The Tiananmen Papers will show that the student movement was legal and well-intentioned, that the government mishandled it, and that the students' and citizens' demands for openness and dialogue should have been honoured. He believes that a series of political reforms should be revived and broadened to allow a free press, autonomous student organizations, free labour unions, and the like.

In 2002, China had its CCP 16th National Congress. At this Congress, China would experience a political leadership overhaul and Zhang hoped that more progressive future leaders would lead China to a more democratic future. By publishing the book a year in advance of the Congress, Zhang wanted to spark the memories of the Chinese public as well as other international support groups; and restore the spirit of the Tiananmen Square protests of 1989.

== Authenticity ==
After arriving in the U.S., Zhang began looking for the most strategic way to publish the documents. He contacted Andrew Nathan and Perry Link, who later brought in Orville Schell, to help assemble the book. In order to authenticate the documents, Nathan, Link, and Schell all describe meeting with Zhang on multiple occasions and corroborating his accounts with documents and other historical interpretations of events around the time of the protests. They also offer detailed arguments about why they consider Zhang's research and collection methods as correct and fair. Perhaps the most convincing reason that supporters of The Tiananmen Papers point to is the Chinese government's reaction to the release of the documents. After the release of the book, the Chinese Communist Party heightened its security by "[cracking down] on dissent," and "[tightening its] surveillance on liberal intellectuals as well as Chinese-American scholars doing research on China." Further, the government began censoring all forms of media (print, internet, audio, etc.) related to the book. Another government reaction was CCP General Secretary Jiang Zemin reportedly stating "that [The Tiananmen Papers] amounted to 'the worse case ever of the leakage of state secrets.'" This purported admittance and search for the leak only corroborates Zhang's argument.

Due to the contentious nature of the material in The Tiananmen Papers, many have refuted its claims and the authenticity of the documents presented. As could be expected, the main opposition comes from the Chinese Communist Party. It claims to have knowledge of one of Zhang's colleagues, who alleges that he and Zhang collected some readily accessible materials from a news agency; followed by Zhang fleeing with the documents, incorrectly labelling them as Party reports, and finally fabricating further materials culminating in the book, The Tiananmen Papers. Further, the government accuses Zhang and his colleagues as being under foreign influence and aiming to extinguish the economic progress China has made over the past decade. Not only the government is contesting the accuracy of the book, but prominent China experts, as well as citizens who had been present during the protests of 1989, feel the documents and conversations discussed in The Tiananmen Papers are factually erroneous and "[overly]-dramatic." Also, critics argue that some expressions used in discussions between elders and other political players are inconsistent with the language of the elders, and more relative to Hong Kong and Taiwan.

== Since Tiananmen Papers ==
After the book's success, Zhang published several articles on current affairs in China for the Hong Kong Chinese press. During the publication of The Tiananmen Papers in 2001, Zhang resided in the U.S. Since then, his whereabouts are unknown.
