= 2000 Nobel Prize in Literature =

Literary award

- Gao Xingjian
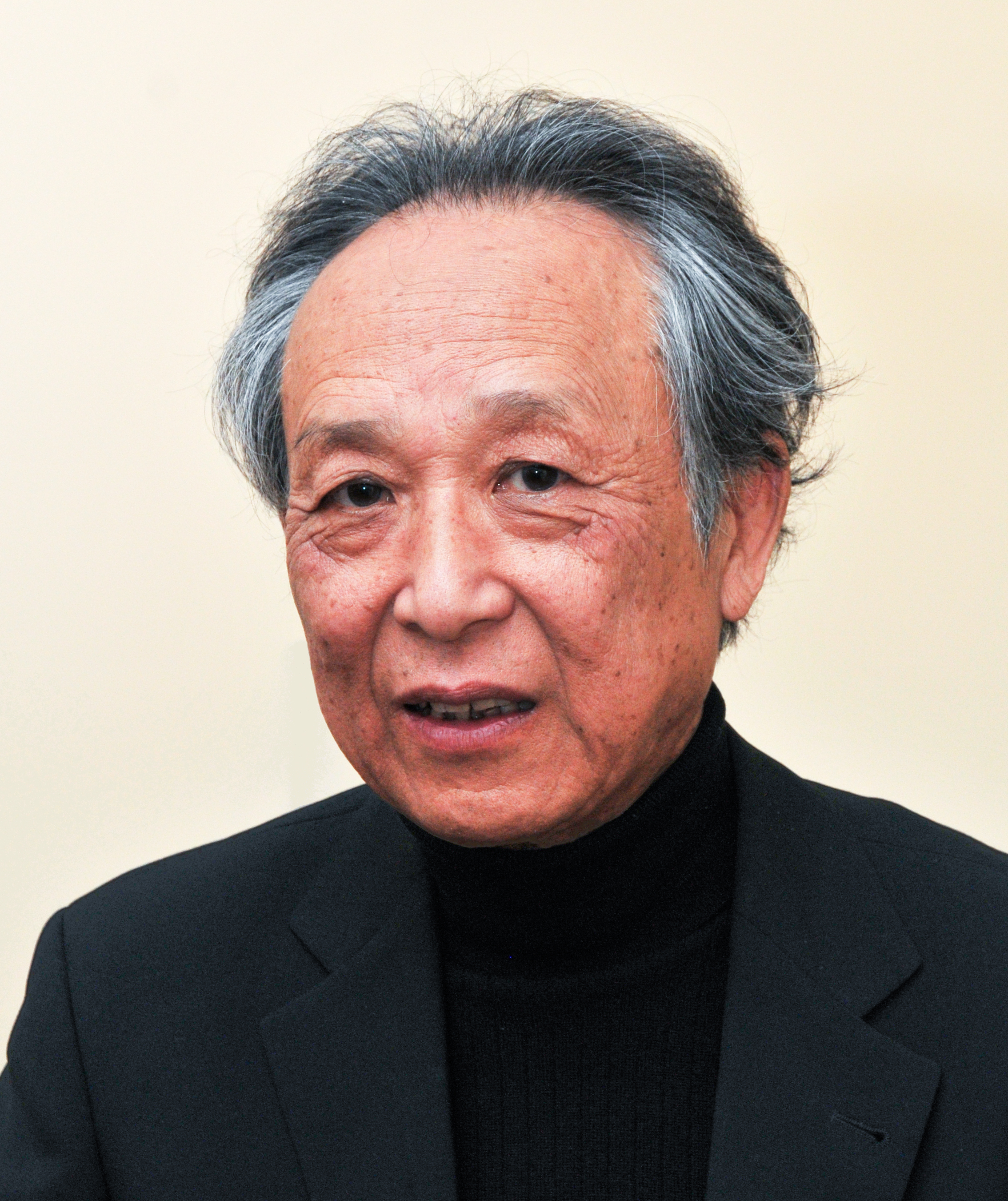
- "for an æuvre of universal validity, bitter insights and linguistic ingenuity, which has opened new paths for the Chinese novel and drama."
- Date: 12 October 2000 (announcement); 10 December 2000 (ceremony)
- Location: Stockholm, Sweden
- Presented by: Swedish Academy
- First award: 1901
- Website: Official website

The 2000 Nobel Prize in Literature was awarded to the Chinese émigré writer Gao Xingjian (born 1940) "for an œuvre of universal validity, bitter insights and linguistic ingenuity, which has opened new paths for the Chinese novel and drama." He is the first Chinese recipient of the prize followed by Mo Yan in 2012.

== Laureate ==
The fusion of traditional Chinese literature and theater with a Western and modernist style is a defining feature of Gao Xingjian's writing. He traveled to southern and southwestern China while facing greater persecution from the Chinese government, and these experiences served as the inspiration for the 1999 novel Língshān ("Soul Mountain"). It is a mash-up of literary styles and genres with accounts of individuals Gao encountered on the road, including monks, folk singers, a victim of the Cultural Revolution, and others. His other celebrated works of fiction are Gěi wǒ lǎoyé mǎi yú gān ("Buying a Fishing Rod for My Grandfather", 1986–1990) and Yīgèrén de shèngjīng ("One Man's Bible", 1999). He is also a noted translator of various plays particularly of Samuel Beckett and Eugène Ionesco.

== Pre-announcement speculations ==
Speculations on who would be awarded the 2000 Nobel Prize in Literature included Irish author William Trevor, Indian-born British Salman Rushdie, Trinidad-born British V. S. Naipaul, Peruvian Mario Vargas Llosa, South African J. M. Coetzee, Canadian Margaret Atwood, Nigerian Ben Okri, Americans Philip Roth and Norman Mailer. Naipaul, Coetzee and Vargas Llosa were subsequently awarded the 2001, 2003 and 2010 Nobel Prizes in Literature, respectively.

== Reactions ==
Gao Xingjian was seen as a surprise choice. In Sweden, it was widely expected that the better-known poet and dissident writer Bei Dao, who had been published in the Swedish royal academy's cultural magazine publication Artes for many years, would become the first Chinese Nobel Prize laureate in literature. Internationally the choice of Gao Xingjian was heavily criticized. The professor of Chinese history and literature at University of Canberra, Geremie Barmé, called it "a comical masterpiece", while saying he was happy that a Chinese writer, "even an uneven and mediocre" one, had finally been awarded the prize. Respected literature critic Thomas Steinfeld, chief editor of literature at the German newspaper Frankfurter Allgemeine Zeitung expressed a feeling of humiliation that the prize had been awarded to an author unknown to them. In China, the news that the dissident writer Gao Xingjian had been awarded the Nobel Prize in Literature was first met with silence in Chinese media, then Gao Xingjian was condemned.

While the awarding of Gao Xingjian was largely met with silence in China, it was widely reported in Taiwan. Writing for Taiwan Panorama, Chang Chiung-fan said "Some have commented that for the prize to go to French-resident Gao, whose works are not widely read in either mainland China or Taiwan, while other authors whose works are highly influential on both sides of the Taiwan Strait have not been so recognized, inevitably gives the impression that the Nobel judges approach Chinese culture through their own cultural traditions, and can more easily accept a writer like Gao whose style is close to Western modernism." Columbia University professor and literary critic Wang Dewei was cited saying that "Gao Xingjian is a highly innovative writer with original ideas", whose "literary status, his creative style and his accessibility surely make him a fitting choice to receive the prize, whether on behalf of Chinese authors or of writers in exile." Lee Chiao, president of local authors' association Taiwan Pen, was also reported being positive to the choice of Gao Xingjian. "It proves one thing: even though Asia is beset by all kinds of worries, literature has not ground to a halt."

In Britain, the choice of Gao Xingjian provoked mixed reactions. Michael Hockx, lecturer in modern Chinese literature at the London School of Oriental and African Studies said that Gao was a worthy recipient of the award: "He is extremely influential as an experimental theatre writer. He caused something of a revolution in Chinese drama - mixing the western influences of Brecht and the theatre of the absurd with conventional Chinese practices [...] He is writing in rich directions". But Bill Jenner, head of Chinese studies at Leeds University disagreed, saying: "He made a bit of a name about 15 years ago for very sub-Beckett kind of stuff. He was a leading name of a short-lived literary flowering, copying western experimental theatre. I wouldn't have thought anyone would have thought him a runner for the Nobel prize. He's a perfectly good writer - but, if you're looking for someone special, half a dozen British dramatists spring to mind as having a stronger claim."

In France, Les Echos writer Annie Coppermann said that Gao Xingjian was awarded "To everyone's surprise. his own, and that of the observers, for whom the favorites seemed to be, this year, the Trinidadian of Indian origin VS Naipaul or the American writer Philip Roth", and stated that Gao Xiangjian is an author "who can certainly be presented as the 13th French winner" of the Nobel Prize in Literature, but, "above all, the first Chinese-speaking Nobel laureate in the history of the Nobel Prize." (Naipaul subsequently won the following year.)

== Nobel lecture ==
On December 7, 2000, Gao Xingjian delivered his Nobel Lecture at the Swedish Academy in the Chinese language, the second in such language after Samuel C. C. Ting. His lecture was entitled The Case for Literature.

== Award ceremony speech ==
At the award ceremony on 10 December 2000, professor Göran Malmqvist of the Swedish Academy spoke about Gao Xingjian's two novels Soul Mountain and One Man's Bible, saying that the former "stands out as one of the foremost works in twentieth-century Chinese literature" and the latter companion novel a work in which the author further "give his view on the meaning of human existence, the nature of literature, the conditions of authorship and, first and foremost, on the importance of remembering and of imagination for the author’s view of reality." On Gao Xingjian's work as a dramatist, Malmqvist said: "Gao Xingjian’s plays are characterized by originality, in no way diminished by the fact that he has been influenced both by modern Western and traditional Chinese currents. His greatness as a dramatist lies in the manner in which he has succeeded in enriching these fundamentally different elements and making them coalesce to something entirely new."

== Controversy ==
Gao Xingjian's Swedish translator Göran Malmqvist, was a member of the Swedish Academy and was responsible for the translation to Swedish for Nobel Prize consideration. Ten days before the award decision was made public, Gao Xingjian changed his Swedish publisher (from Forum to Atlantis), but Göran Malmqvist has denied leaking information about the award.
