= Bus stop (disambiguation) =

A bus stop is a place, other than a terminal, established for buses to pick up and drop off passengers

Bus Stop may also refer to:

== Culture ==
- Bus Stop (play), a 1955 play by William Inge
- The Bus Stop 《車站》, a 1983 Chinese-language play by Gao Xingjian

=== Film ===
- Bus Stop (1956 film), a 1956 film, loosely based on the 1955 play by William Inge, with Marilyn Monroe and Don Murray
- Bus Stop (1982 film), the 1982 retelling of the original 1955 play starring Tim Matheson
- Bus Stop (2012 film), a 2012 Telugu Indian film directed by Maruthi
- Bus Stop (2017 film), a 2017 Marathi Indian film directed by Sameer Joshi

=== TV ===
- Bus Stop (TV series), a 1961-62 television series
- Bus Stop (2000 TV series), a 2000 Japanese series starring Naoko Iijima

== Music ==
- Bus Stop (band), a 1998 band known for a version of "Kung Fu Fighting"
- Bus Stop (album), a 1966 album by The Hollies
- Bus Stop, a popular line dance style of the 1970s

=== Songs ===
- "Bus Stop" (song), a 1966 single by The Hollies
- "The Bus Stop Song", a 1956 single by The Four Lads, used as the intro song for the 1956 film Bus Stop
- "(Are You Ready) Do The Bus Stop", a 1975 single by Fatback Band, also known as "Do the Bus Stop"
