= Longxugou =

Dragon Beard Ditch
- Written by: Lao She
- Original language: Chinese

Premiere
- Date premiered: 1951
- Place premiered: Beijing

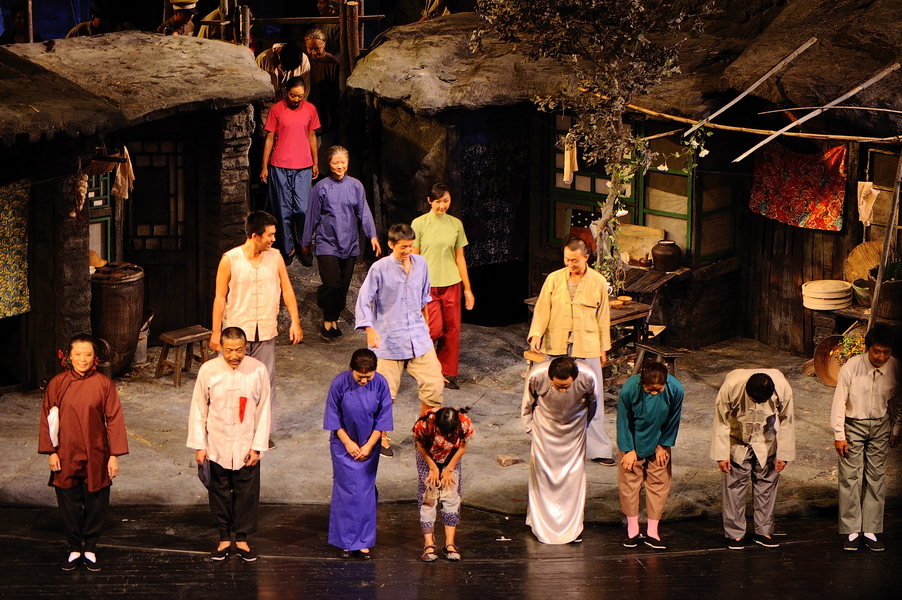
A 2009 performance

Longxugou (Chinese: 《龙须沟》 "Dragon Beard Ditch" "Dragon Whisker Creek") is a 1951 Chinese play by Lao She written at the invitation of the Beijing Government for Li Bozhao's Beijing People's Art Theatre. The play is named after the Beijing neighbourhood, at the time being presented as a model of socialist reconstruction.
