= Mabel Lee =

Australian linguist

Mabel Lee (Chinese: 陳順妍, b. 1939) is Professor Emerita of Chinese Studies in the Faculty of Arts and Social Sciences at the University of Sydney, and concurrently Honorary Adjunct Professor in the School of Humanities and Social Sciences at Hang Seng University of Hong Kong (2026–2029). She taught Chinese Studies at The University of Sydney (1966–2000), and from 1980 to 2000 she co-edited the two University of Sydney Series: East Asian Series and World Literature Series while also working as assistant-editor and review editor of The Journal of the Oriental Society of Australia.

== Biography ==
Lee was born Mabel Hunt on 24 December 1939 in Warialda, New South Wales, Australia. After completing secondary education at Parramatta High School she enrolled in1957 at the University of Sydney where she graduated BA with first-class honours in 1962 for her thesis on the life and work of the famous late-Qing/Republican scholar and industrialist Zhang Jian (1853–1926). She followed by enrolling in the University of Sydney’s postgraduate program, and in 1966 graduated with her PhD thesis on the Exalt Commerce Movement of late-Qing China.

In January 1966 Lee joined the Chinese Studies Department of the University of Sydney, and began her career of teaching and research on the language, literature and intellectual history of modern China. In those pioneering days of Chinese studies in Australia, Lee carried out the work of mobilizing her colleagues to collaboratively publish a set of language teaching materials for both modern and classical Chinese studies. In 1981, she co-founded an independent publishing company, Wild Peony Pty Ltd, and organized international distribution through the University of Hawaii Press.

The proceeds from the sale of Wild Peony’s Chinese language textbooks provided a capital bedrock for the publication of 40 titles contained in the two University of Sydney series: East Asian Series and World Literature Series. These series published research and literary works relating to various Asian cultures and their connections with the wider world. From 1985 to 2000, Lee also served as assistant editor and review editor of The Journal of the Oriental Society of Australia.

In 1959 while an undergraduate student, Lee was elected founding president of the University of Sydney Chinese Students Association, and in 1989 she was elected founding president of the Chinese Studies Association of Australia. She organized the second biennial conference of the association at the University of Sydney in 1991 and frequently arranged public seminars featuring visiting Chinese writers, artists, playwrights and performers. Lee has served on the boards of the Sydney Writers’ Festival and the New South Wales Writers’ Centre.

After retiring from her University of Sydney appointment in January 2000, Lee substantially reduced academic and editorial commitments. Nonetheless she continued to maintain an international academic presence through appointments at the Open University of Hong Kong (later renamed Hong Kong Metropolitan University) as distinguished professor and honorary professor. She is professor emerita in the Faculty of Arts and Social Sciences at the University of Sydney and is also honorary adjunct professor at Hang Seng University of Hong Kong (2026–2029). Lee is an honorary fellow of the Australian Academy of the Humanities.

== Research and scholarly works ==
Lee’s early research concerned Chinese intellectual history and literature during the late-nineteenth and early-twentieth centuries. Her doctoral thesis explored how traditional scholars were forced to turn from literary pursuits to addressing the problem of national survival in the context of confronting the intrusions of the industrialized West and Japan. She subsequently established international credentials as a Lu Xun scholar through the simultaneous publication in English and Chinese of her essay “Suicide of the Creative Self: the Case of Lu Xun.” The Chinese version published in Yue Daiyun, ed., Haiwai xuezhe yanjiu Lu Xun lunwenji (1960–1980) (Collected Essays on Lu Xun by Foreign Scholars, 1960–1980), Beijing: Peking University Press, 1981, presented a viewpoint at odds with that promoted by China’s literary authorities. The English-language version was published in A.R. Davis and A.D. Stefanowska, eds., Austrina: Essays in Commemoration of the 25th Anniversary of the Founding of the Oriental Society of Australia, Sydney: Oriental Society of Australia, 1982, but the publication suffered from the lack of an effective distribution outlet. Over the years, Lee’s English-language publications on Lu Xun were translated and reprinted in various academic publications in China, and Lee recently published her Lu Xun essays in an open access online collection: Lu Xun and His Wild Grass Poems (2025).

Since 1990 Lee has established her research and translation credentials for three internationally acclaimed contemporary Chinese writers: Yang Lian (b. 1955), Hong Ying (b. 1962), and most notably 2000 Nobel Laureate Gao Xingjian (b. 1940). Her translations have contributed to making these important contemporary Chinese writers accessible to English-language readers. Her translation of Gao Xingjian’s Soul Mountain was published in July 2000, shortly before The Swedish Academy announced that Gao would receive the Nobel Prize for Literature that year. Lee subsequently also translated Gao’s novel One Man’s Bible (2002), his short story collection Buying a Fishing Rod for My Grandfather (2004) and his book of literary criticism The Case for Literature (2006).

== Awards and honours ==
- 2001: Received the New South Wales Premier’s inaugural Prize for Translation and the PEN Medallion.
- 2003: Awarded the Centenary of Federation Medal for service to Australian society and literature.
- 2003: Received the University of Sydney Alumni Award for her contribution to Asian scholarship and creativity in Australia.
- 2004: Elected an Honorary Fellow of the Australian Academy of the Humanities.
- 2008: Received the Australia–China Council Award “for her contribution to Australia–China relations through translation.”
- 2008: Her translation of Soul Mountain was selected by the UK-based Translation Association of the Society of Authors as “one of the 50 outstanding translations of the preceding half-century.”

== Selected publications ==
- Lee, M. (1990). Masks and crocodile: A contemporary Chinese poet and his poetry (Yang L., Author). Wild Peony.
- Lee, M. (2000). Soul mountain (Gao X., Author). HarperCollins.
- Lee, M. (2002). One man’s Bible (Gao X., Author). HarperCollins.
- Lee, M. (2002). Yi (Yang L., Author). Green Integer.
- Lee, M. (2004). Buying a fishing rod for my grandfather (Gao X., Author). HarperCollins.
- Lee, M. (2006). The case for literature (Gao X., Author). HarperCollins.
- Lee, M. (2012). Aesthetics and creation (Gao X., Author). Cambria Press.
- Lee, M., Cheung, C.-Y., & Wiles, S. (Eds.). (2016). Lu Xun and Australia. Australian Scholarly Publishing.
- Lee, M., & Liu, J. (Eds.). (2018). Gao Xingjian and transmedia aesthetics. Cambria Press.
- Lee, M. (Ed.). (2018). Painting history: China’s revolution in a global context (Shen J., Author). Cambria Press.
- Lee, M. (Ed.). (2022). Calling for a new renaissance (Gao Xingjian, Author; M. Lee & Qian, Y., Trans.). Cambria Press.
- Lee, M. (2025). Lu Xun and his Wild Grass poems. Sydney Studies in Society and Culture.
