= Richard Karn =

American actor (born 1956)

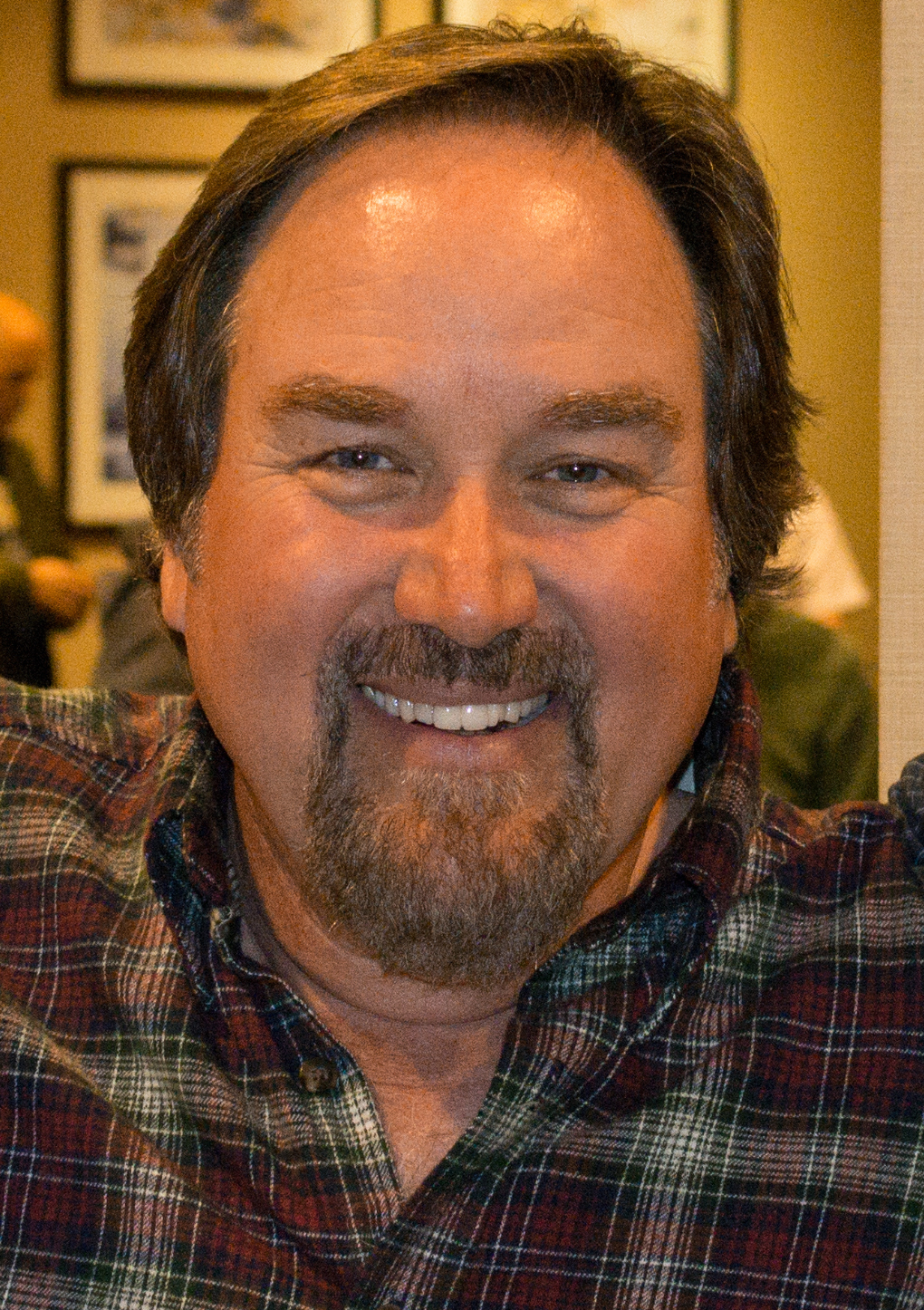
- Karn in 2015
- Born: Richard Karn Wilson; February 17, 1956 (age 70); Seattle, Washington, U.S.
- Education: University of Washington
- Occupations: Actor; author; game show host
- Years active: 1979–present
- Spouse: Tudi Roche (m. 1985)
- Children: 1

Richard Karn (born Richard Karn Wilson; February 17, 1956) is an American actor, author and former game show host. He starred as Al Borland in the ABC series Home Improvement and as Fred Peters in the Hulu series Pen15. Karn was also the fourth host of Family Feud from 2002 to 2006.

== Early life ==
Richard Karn Wilson was born in Seattle, Washington, on February 17, 1956. His father, Gene, was a Seabee who served in World War II. Richard graduated from Roosevelt High School and the University of Washington Professional Actor Training Program, where he was a member of Beta Theta Pi. Karn also gained drama experience in Scotland at the Edinburgh Festival.

After earning his drama degree in 1979, Karn moved to New York City, where in less than a week he was hired to do a commercial for Michelob beer that was featured during Super Bowl XIV. When Karn joined the Screen Actors Guild, he was informed there was already a Richard Wilson, prompting him to drop his surname. In 1983, he made his acting debut in the off-broadway play, The Other Shore, where he also co-starred with future wife Tudi Roche.

== Career ==
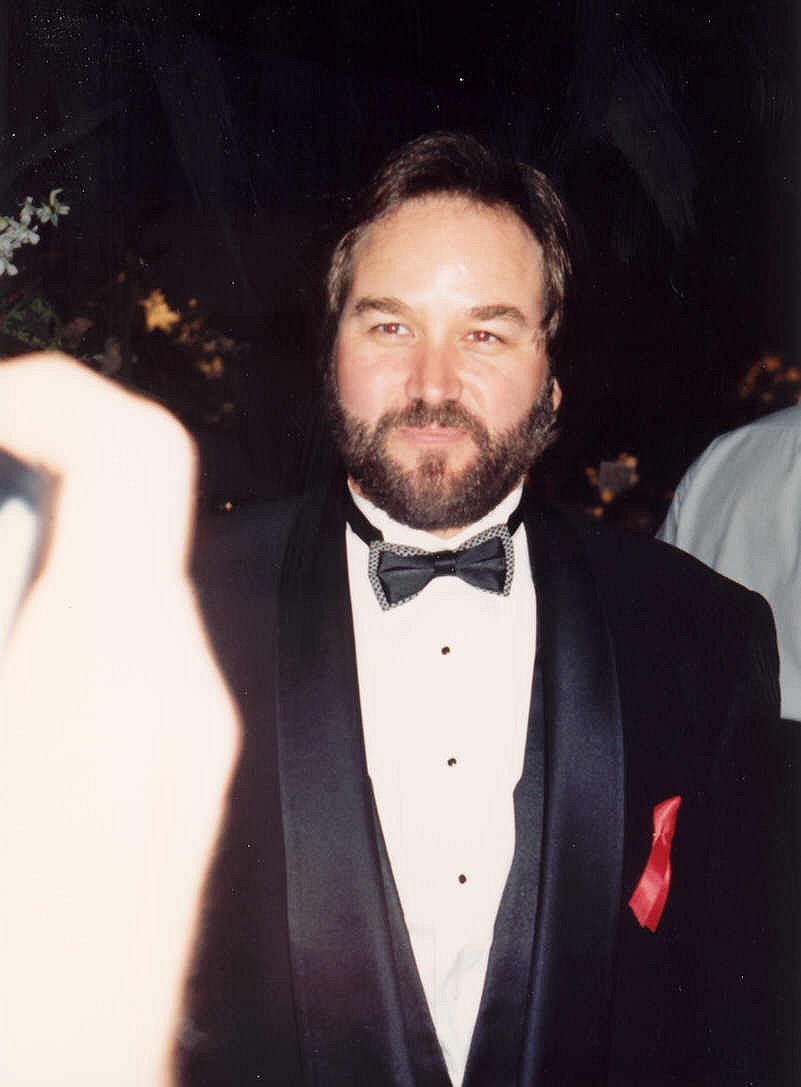
Karn at the 1994 Emmy Awards

In 1989, Karn's wife, Tudi, convinced him to move to Los Angeles. Karn found a place for them to live by managing an apartment complex, catering events at a Jewish synagogue on the side. After receiving a traffic citation, Karn attended a traffic school and sat beside an agent who told him about casting for the new television show Home Improvement. The role of Al Borland had already been given to Stephen Tobolowsky, but when taping was scheduled, Tobolowsky was busy with another movie and the role had to be recast. Karn was a guest star in the pilot episode but became a regular cast member when the show was picked up by ABC.

In 2002, Karn replaced Louie Anderson as the fourth host of the game show Family Feud. He left Family Feud in 2006 and was replaced by John O'Hurley.

In 2002, Karn made an appearance in The Strokes' music video for "Someday", which featured segments of the band on a fictional showing of Family Feud against the band Guided by Voices.

On October 6, 2008, Karn replaced Patrick Duffy as host of Game Show Network's Bingo America. He also served as a substitute host on GSN Radio.

Karn did commercials for Orchard Supply Hardware in the 1990s.

== Personal life ==
Karn has been married to actress Tudi Roche since 1985. They have a son named Cooper, who was born on March 4, 1992.

In 1985, a few weeks after he and his wife married, Tudi had a sudden collapse while she and Karn were walking through the Manhattan Port Authority Bus Terminal. She was put in a three-day coma and it was discovered that she suffered from a brain aneurysm. Tudi eventually returned home and made a full recovery.

From 1994 to 1999, Karn hosted an annual celebrity golf tournament in Seattle. In July 2002, the Karn Invitational celebrity golf event was held at Echo Falls Golf Club in Snohomish, Washington.

== Filmography ==
=== Film ===
Year	Title	Role	Notes	Ref(s)
1998	Bram Stoker's Legend of the Mummy	Brice Renard		
2001	MVP: Most Vertical Primate	Ollie Plant		
2002	Sex and the Teenage Mind	Stanley Heitmeyer		
2002	Reality School	Victor Cayanne		
2002	Air Bud: Seventh Inning Fetch	Patrick		
2006	Air Buddies	Patrick		
2006	Mr. Blue Sky	John		
2008	Snow Buddies	Patrick		
2011	The Back-up Bride	Shane Bingham		
2011	Poolboy: Drowning Out the Fury	Bill Witherspoon		
2013	Gordon Family Tree	Perry Merrow		
2015	A Dog for Christmas	Santa		
2016	Stars Are Already Dead	Jim		
2017	The Horse Dancer	Jerry		
2017	F the Prom	Murphy Datner		
2018	Amanda and the Fox	Judge Weartherbee		
2019	Check Inn to Christmas	Tim		
2020	Horse Camp: A Love Tail	Jerry		
2021	The Christmas Dance	Sherman		
2022	Carrie and Jess Save the Universe!	Computer face		

=== Television ===
Year	Title	Role	Notes	Ref(s)
1989	One Life to Live	Edgar	1 episode	
1991	Carol & Company	J.T.	Episode: "No News Is Bad News"	
1991–1999	Home Improvement	Al Borland	Main role	
1994	ABC After School Specials	Mr. Delo	Episode: "Boys Will Be Boys"	
1995	Burke's Law	David Bergen	Episode: "Who Killed Mr. Game Show?"	
1995	Picture Perfect	George Thomas	Television film	
1995	Boy Meets World	Victor	Episode: "This Little Piggy"	
1996	WOW! The Most Amazing Acts on Earth	Host		
1996	Chariots of the Gods? The Mysteries Continue	Host		
1996	How to Host a BBQ with Richard Karn	Host	Short	
1996–1999	The Rosie O'Donnell Show	Himself/Guest	2 episodes	
1997	Soul Man	Al Borland	Episode: "Cinderella and the Funeral"	
1998	Foot Soldier	Host / Narrator	Television film	
2000	The Pooch and the Pauper	Agent Dainville	Television film	
2000	Recess	Edmund P. Edmonton (voice)	Episode: "Beyond a Reasonable Scout"	
2001	That '70s Show	Theo	Episode: "Bye Bye Basement"	
2001	The Lot	Stan Lunquist	Episode: "The Mob Scene"	
2001	The Chronicle	David Tally	Episode: "Baby Got Back"	
2002–2006	Family Feud	Host	Main role	
2003	Watching Ellie	Himself	Episode: "Feud"	
2004	Reality School	Founder	Television film	
2008	Dirt	Holt McLauren's Father	Episode: "Ties That (Don't) Bind"	
2008	Biz Kid$	Himself	2 episodes	
2008–2009	Bingo America	Co-host	Main role	
2009	Ctrl	Arthur Piller	Recurring role	
2010	True Jackson, VP	Fire Marshal O'Dannon	Episode: "My Boss Ate My Homework"	
2011	In Gayle We Trust	Mayor Thomas	Episode: "Gayle and the Table Read"	
2013	Last Man Standing	Bill McKendree	2 episodes	
2014	A Daughter's Nightmare	Cameron "Cam" Morgan	Television film	
2014	No Such Luck	Sheriff Lawrence	Short	
2014	Perfect Christmas List	Tim	Television film	
2015	Christmas Land	Mason Richards	Television film	
2017	Detroiters	Himself	Episode: "Quick Rick Mahorn in Dearborn"	
2017	The Bold and the Beautiful	Judge Jon Oplinger	2 episodes	
2017	Christmas in Mississippi	Mr. McGuire	Television film	
2018	Find Your Future Reality	Himself	1 episode	
2019	Check Inn to Christmas	Tim Crawley	Television film	
2019–2021	PEN15	Fred Peters	Recurring role	
2021	Assembly Required	Co-host	COVID-lockdown competition show spin-off of Home Improvement's Tool Time; with Tim Allen and toolgirl April Wilkerson; Also executive producer	
2022	More Power	Co-host	Tool documentary show spin-off of Home Improvement 's Tool Time; with Tim Allen and toolgirl April Wilkerson; Also executive producer (1 episode)	
2025	Shifting Gears	Roger	Episode: "Secret"	

=== Music videos ===
Year	Title	Artist	Album	Role	Notes	Ref(s)
2002	"Someday"	The Strokes	Is This It	Himself	Family Feud	
2018	"Careless Whisper"	Train (feat. Kenny G)	Greatest Hits	Saxophone player	Wham! cover	

== Theatre ==
Year	Title	Role	Notes	Ref(s)
1983	The Other Shore	Performer	Off-broadway	

== Books ==
- House Broken: How I Remodeled My Home for Just Under Three Times the Original Bid (1999) – ISBN 0-06-105144-6 (with George Mair)
- Handy at Home: Tips on Improving Your Home from America's Favorite Handyman (2002) – ISBN 0-312-30606-7 (with George Mair)

Media offices
Preceded by Louie Anderson	Host of Family Feud; 2002–2006	Succeeded by John O'Hurley
