= Tudi Roche =

American actress & singer (born 1955)

- Born: July 19, 1955 (age 71); San Angelo, Texas, U.S.
- Occupations: Actress; singer
- Years active: 1981–present
- Spouse: Richard Karn (m. 1985)
- Children: 1

Tudi Roche (born July 19, 1955) is an American actress and singer. She is best known for her recurring role as Carrie on the sitcom Home Improvement (1995–1998).

== Personal life ==
Roche was born in San Angelo, Texas. She attended Texas Christian University, but did not graduate. She has been married to actor Richard Karn since 1985. They have a son named Cooper, born March 4, 1992.

In 1985, a few weeks after she and Karn got married, Tudi had a sudden collapse while she and Karn were walking through the Manhattan Port Authority Bus Terminal. Tudi was put in a three-day coma and it was discovered that she suffered from a brain aneurysm. She eventually returned home and made a full recovery.

== Filmography ==
=== Film ===
Year	Title	Role	Notes
1998	City of Angels	Messinger's Daughter	
2001	Pursuit of Happiness	Conrad Receptionist	
2002	Reality School	Student	Short film

=== Television ===
Year	Title	Role	Notes
1981	Ryan's Hope	Kate Alexander	2 episodes
1990	Dream On	Chorus	Episode: "Angst for the Memories"
1991	Pacific Station	Mailperson	Episode: "Magnificent Obsession"
1991–1998	Home Improvement	Carrie Patterson	6 episodes
1993	The John Larroquette Show	Karen	Episode: "The Past Comes Back"
1994	Breach of Conduct	Enlist Women	Television film
2018	The Epic Tales of Captain Underpants	Bernice Krupp (voice)	1 episode
2019	Love, Death & Robots	Crazy Mel (voice)	Episode: "Suits"
2019	Star Wars Resistance	Mika Grey (voice)	2 episodes
2025	Star Wars: Tales of the Underworld	Cort (voice)	1 episode

=== Video games ===
Year	Title	Voice role	Notes
2018	Red Dead Redemption 2	The Local Pedestrian Population	

== Theatre ==
Year	Title	Role	Notes
1983	The Other Shore	Performer	Off-broadway
