= Teahouse (play) =

Play by Lao She

- Original language: Chinese
- Written by: Lao She

Premiere
- Date: 1957
- Place: Beijing

Teahouse (Chinese: 茶馆; pinyin: Cháguǎn) is a 1957 play by Lao She. The play was first published in Shouhuo (Chinese: 收获; lit. 'Harvest') in July 1957.

== Plot ==
The Hindu published 20 February, 2009 noted a local production of the play and described its plot: "Through a graphic depiction of what happened to a teahouse in Beijing and the fate of Wang Lifa, boss of teahouse and a group of people connected therewith, “Teahouse” mirrors the then social turmoil and the seamy side of society."

The plot description in the original Chinese version of this article, when translated, gives this version: "In the drama, Beijing Yutai Teahouse is the background, depicting the various characters of society. Through the changes in the life of the various characters in the teahouse during the last five years of the Qing Dynasty, the period of the warlord's separatist period and the Second Sino-Japanese War, reflecting the changes of society, returning to the social life before the founding of the People's Republic of China, reflecting the old from the side the social outlook of the times."

== Criticism and influence ==
While Teahouse had been radical and popular in 1957, after Lao She's death by suicide in 1966 the play became one of the emblematic targets of attack for the Cultural Revolution. Beijing People's Art Theatre (BPAT) did not restage Teahouse until 1979, and the play was not widely performed for the public till 1985. It is now, however, widely considered to be a classic of 20th century Chinese drama.

== Performance history ==
Teaouse made its debut at the Beijing Capital Theatre by the Beijing People's Art Theatre (PAT) on 29 March, 1958, with Jiao Juyin and Xia Chun directing and starring Yu Shizhi as Wang Lifa. This drama has been going on for decades. Become a classic repertoire of the Beijing People's Art Theatre. On 16 July, 1992, at the 40th anniversary of the establishment of the Beijing People's Art Theatre, the old version of "Tea House" performed 374th in the Capital Theater and became a farewell performance.

On 12 October, 1999, Tea House re-arranged by the Beijing People's Art Theatre with a new lineup was performed at the Capital Theater . The director was Lin Zhaohua . As of 27 May, 2004, the show has performed 500 times. In 2005, Jiao Juyin’s version was resumed. On March 10, 2010, the show was performed for the 600th time.

On 21 July, 2017, Wang Chong directed "Tea House 2.0," the first major reinterpretation after Lin's. The 44 actors performed to only 11 audience each time, with the original lines by Lao She. There was no tea and no "old society" in the performance. Instead, in the sense of post-dramatic theater, the audience saw the classroom life of a high school in Beijing for three years." It was performed in an actual high school classroom in Beijing.
