= Mats Malm =

Swedish literary historian and translator

Mats Ulrik Malm
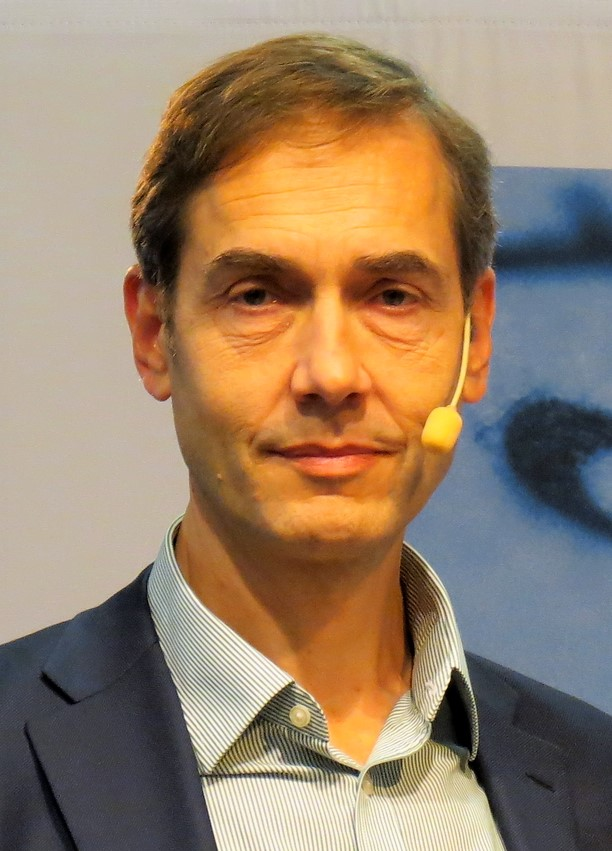
- Born: 10 May 1964 (age 62); Gothenburg, Sweden
- Occupations: Translator, literary historian, editor
- Spouse: Gunilla Hermansson

Member of the Swedish Academy (Seat No. 11)
- Incumbent
- Assumed office 20 December 2018
- Preceded by: Klas Östergren

Permanent Secretary of the Swedish Academy
- In office June 2019 – June 2026
- Preceded by: Anders Olsson
- Succeeded by: Ingrid Carlberg

Mats Ulrik Malm (born 10 May 1964) is a Swedish literary writer and translator. On 18 October 2018, Malm was elected a member of the Swedish Academy, on 26 April 2019 he was elected the new Permanent Secretary and Speaker of the Swedish Academy.

Mats Malm is a university professor of literary science at the University of Gothenburg. He has a PhD in Gothicism. As a translator, he has published Icelandic Sagas. He is working on digitizing Swedish literature as director of the Swedish Literature Bank. Since 2012, Malm has been a member of the Royal Swedish Academy of Letters, History and Antiquities. On 18 October 2018, Malm was elected member of the Swedish Academy, where he succeeded Klas Östergren in Chair No. 11. On 20 December 2025, Malm announced he would step down from his office as Permanent Secretary and will be succeeded by Ingrid Carlberg.

== Works ==
- Voluptuous Language and Poetic Ambivalence. The Example of Swedish Baroque, Peter Lang Verlag, Frankfurt am Main etc. 2011, ISBN 978-3-631-59299-1.
- Minervas äpple: om diktsyn, tolkning och bildspråk inom nordisk göticism (1996)
- Textens auktoritet: de första svenska romanernas villkor (2001)
- Det liderliga språket: poetisk ambivalens i svensk "barock" (2004)
- Poesins röster: avlyssningar av äldre litteratur (2011)
- The Soul of Poetry Redefined: Vacillations of Mimesis from Aristotle to Romanticism (Copenhagen: Museum Tusculanum Press, 2012)

=== Translations ===
- Gautreks saga (Samspråk, 1990)
- Gísla saga (Gísla saga Súrssonar) (Fabel, 1993)
- Carl Jonas Love Almqvist: Om François Rabelais' liv och skrifter (De vita et scriptis Francisci Rabelæsi) (Litteraturvetenskapliga institutionen, University of Gothenburg, 1993)
- Snorri Sturluson: Snorres Edda (Prose Edda) (co-translated with Karl G. Johansson) (Fabel, 1997)
- Gunnlaugs saga ormstungu (Gunnlaugs saga Ormstungu) (Saga forlag Reykjavik, 2014)
- Hrafnkels saga (Hrafnkels saga Freygoða) (Saga förlag Reykjavik, 2014)

== Awards ==
- Schückska Award of Swedish Academy 2010

Cultural offices
Preceded by Klas Östergren	Swedish Academy, Seat No.11; 2018–	Succeeded by incumbent
