= Jo Riley =

English writer and theatre actor

- Born: Josephine Riley (20th century)
- Citizenship: British
- Education: University of Cambridge (PhD)
- Occupations: Writer, translator, theatre actor, schoolteacher
- Writing career
- Subjects: Chinese theatre, theatre arts
- Notable works: Chinese Theatre and the Actor in Performance (1997)

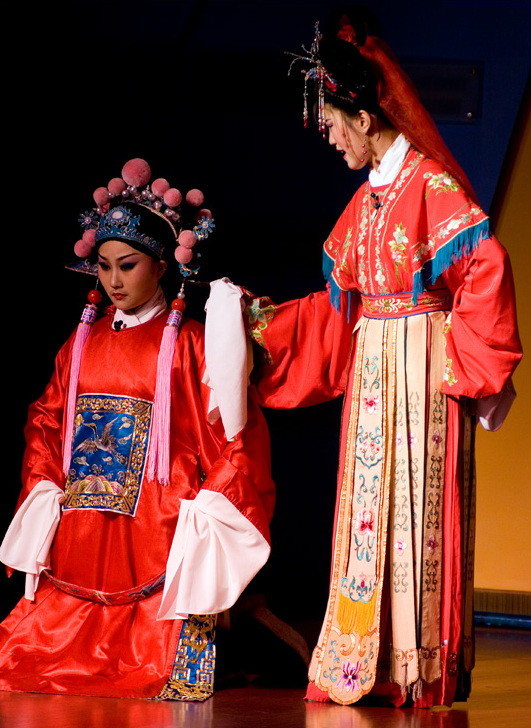
An example of Huangmei opera performance.

Josephine Riley is a British writer, translator, theatre actor, and schoolteacher. Dr. Riley has written and translated several books about theatre arts, especially Chinese theatre. She currently teaches film and drama in the United Kingdom.

Riley reads, writes, and speaks Mandarin Chinese, and is better known for having in the early 1980s widely travelled in China and learned to act in the Chinese theatre as one of the first foreign students at the Central Academy of Drama in Beijing, eventually writing Chinese Theatre and the Actor in Performance (1997, Cambridge University Press), a reference book that "gives an 'inside' view of Chinese theatre and the actor in performance for the first time [...] from her personal observations of, and dialogue with, Chinese actors and her first-hand experiences of the theatre world of China in general, none of which was possible before 1980." She also made the first English translation of The Other Shore by Nobel Laureate in Literature playwright Gao Xingjian.

== Biography ==
=== Life ===
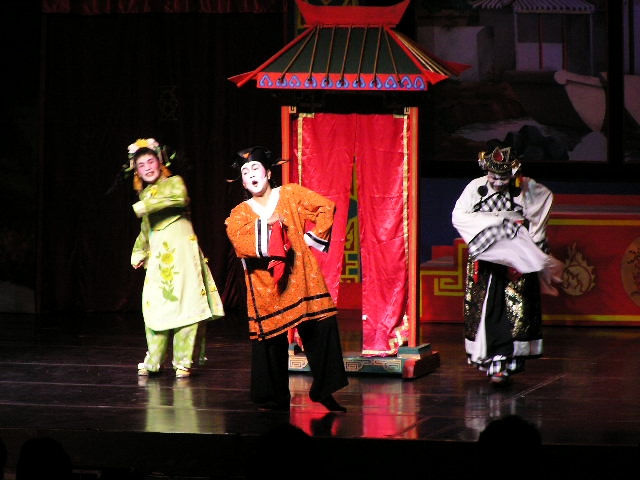
An example of Chinese theater.

Jo Riley graduated from the University of Cambridge. After working for a number of small touring companies, she went to Asia to explore a different kind of theatre. In the early 1980s, after learning Mandarin Chinese, she was one of the first foreign students at the Central Academy of Drama in Beijing, where she learned to act in the Chinese theatre (example pictured at right).

She has since then helped teach and direct traditional Chinese theatre in Salzburg, Mainz, and Bayreuth. She has also been at intercultural workshops with Cardiff Laboratory Theatre and Pan Projects at Goldsmiths College, London. In addition, she has written articles and books on Chinese theatre, especially Chinese Theatre and the Actor in Performance (1997, see Works section), and has edited or translated several plays or books on European and intercultural theatre.

Riley previously taught film at Munich International School in Germany, and has since moved to the United Kingdom and teaches there currently.

=== Works ===
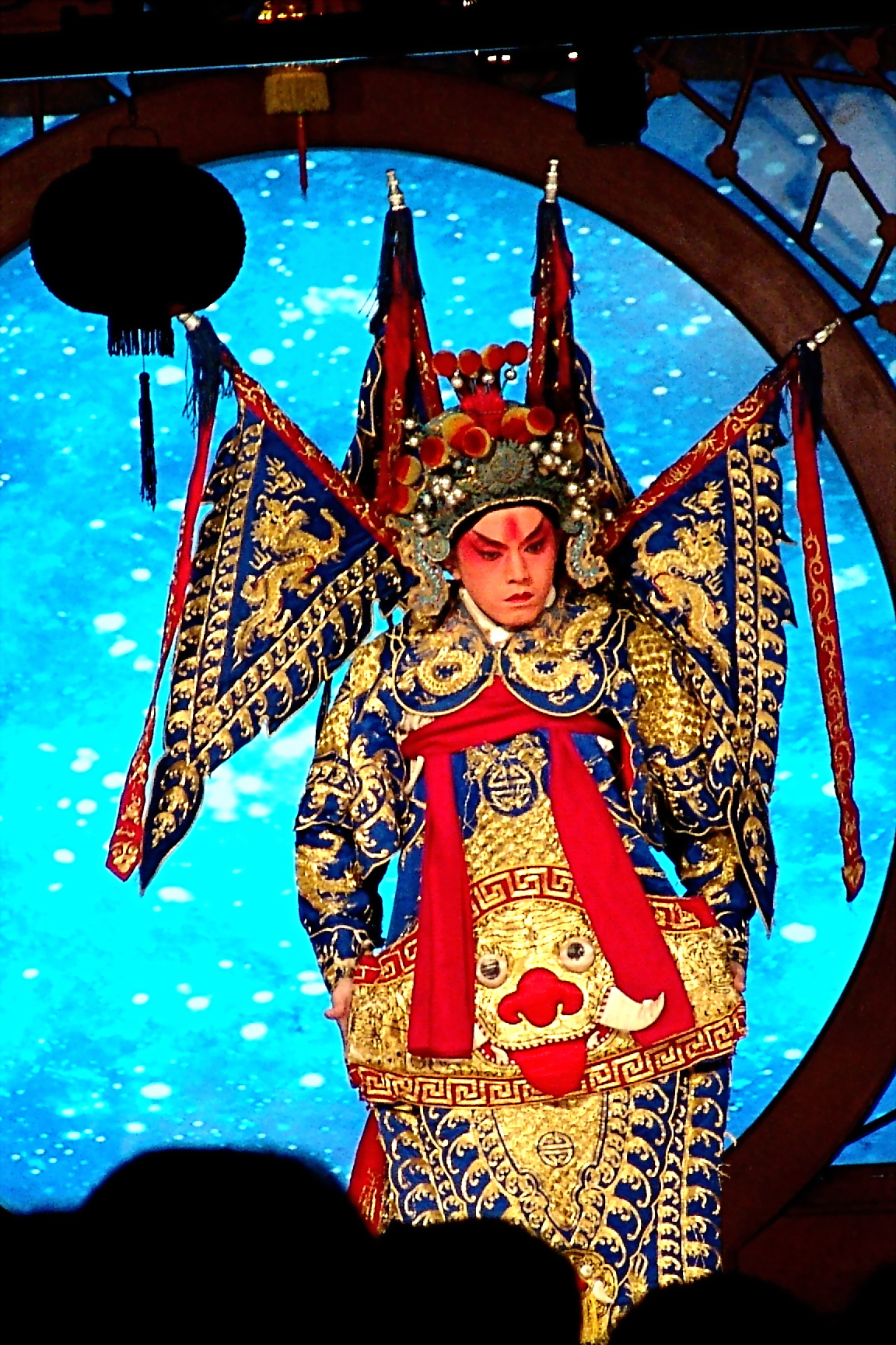
An example of male performer of jingju, the Beijing opera.

In 1997, Cambridge University Press published Riley's Chinese Theatre and the Actor in Performance, a book often cited on the topic of Chinese theatre. It covers not only jingju (Beijing opera or Peking opera, example pictured at right) but also Chinese puppet theatre and shadow play, as well as Chinese exorcism and ancient animation rites at the tomb, to explore how the Chinese create presence on a stage. In a 1999 review for the Asian Theatre Journal, China specialist Prof. Colin Mackerras (author of The Cambridge Handbook of Contemporary China, brother of Malcolm Mackerras) noted how the book "looks at the skills of the Chinese actor from the insider's point of view – not that of the Westerner or the student of China." Indeed:

Jo Riley is one of the few people in the West qualified to undertake such a study because she not only knows Chinese but has learned to act in the Chinese theatre. She has traveled widely in China and examined the various styles of regional theatre that are so abundant and important in China. Although nobody can really divorce himself from his own culture, nor is it sensible to try, Jo Riley does speak as an insider of the Chinese theatre in a way few non-Chinese can match.

Riley also made, under the title The Other Side (1997), the first English translation of the controversial play The Other Shore (1986) by Nobel Laureate in Literature playwright Gao Xingjian.

== Bibliography ==
=== As editor ===
Edited or co-edited publications include:

- 1990: The Dramatic Touch of Difference: Theatre, Own and Foreign, by various
  Collected essays edited by Erika Fischer-Lichte^{(in German)}, Jo Riley, & Michael Gissenwehrer, Forum Modernes Theater, vol. 2, Tübingen: Gunter Narr Verlag, 1990, ISBN 3-8233-4023-9, LCCN 90-190502, OCLC 22509815, GBOOK BoB6jbZqbhgC; 287 p., illustrations, paperback – Co-credit was to "Josephine Riley".
- 1997: The Show and the Gaze of Theatre: A European Perspective, by Erika Fischer-Lichte^{(in German)}
  Collected essays (1986–1995) edited (and some translated from the German into English) by Jo Riley, Studies in Theatre History and Culture, Iowa City: University of Iowa Press, November 1997, ISBN 0-87745-608-9, LCCN 97-24047, OCLC 37392802, GBOOK HF3wu1vVm2gC; 426 (x, 412) p., illustrations, paperback. (Hardback: February 1998, ISBN 0-87745-607-0)

=== As author ===
Publications include:

- 1997: Chinese Theatre and the Actor in Performance
  Cambridge studies in modern theatre, Cambridge, UK: Cambridge University Press, June 1997, ISBN 0-521-57090-5, LCCN 96-31554, OCLC 35085033, GBOOK OIAiYaIfFagC; 360 (xii, 348) p., illustrations, hardback. (Paperback: December 2006, ISBN 0-521-03523-6, OCLC 150387657.)

=== As translator ===
Translations include:

- 1997: The Other Side: A Contemporary Drama Without Acts, by Gao Xingjian
  Translated from the Chinese Bi An (1986; Chinese: 彼岸; pinyin: bǐ'àn) into English by Jo Riley, in Martha P. Y. Cheung & Jane C. C. Lai (eds), An Oxford Anthology of Contemporary Chinese Drama, p. 149–184, Hong Kong & New York: Oxford University Press, September 1997, ISBN 0-19-586880-3, LCCN 97-5298, OCLC 36283949, GBOOK XUFkAAAAMAAJ; 900 (xxvi, 873) p., hardback – Part of an anthology of 15 plays. This play was later retranslated by someone else as The Other Shore for a different collection of plays.
- 2001: History of European Drama and Theatre, by Erika Fischer-Lichte^{(in German)}
  Translated from the German Geschichte des Dramas (1990) into English by Jo Riley, London, UK & New York: Routledge, December 2001, ISBN 0-415-18059-7, LCCN 2001-34969, OCLC 48110496, GBOOK 5JWfX8mjX8AC; 432 (x, 396) p., hardback. (Paperback: May 2004, ISBN 0-415-18060-0, OCLC 56222522.)
