= April Wilkerson =

American maker & YouTuber (born 1987)

- Born: 1987 (age 38–39); Corpus Christi, Texas, U.S.
- Known for: DIY construction videos

April Wilkerson (born 1987) is an American YouTuber who specializes in do-it-yourself woodworking and metalworking projects around the home.

== Career ==
Wilkerson is from Texas. She graduated from the University of Texas at Arlington in 2012, after studying business management, and began working on projects to improve her house. Wilkerson had a long to-do list of home improvement projects. She posted a blog, which led to her creating YouTube videos in which she described her process of figuring out how to build things such as a planter, a light above a pool table, an outdoor pressurized air line between shops, a porch, a coffee table, an outdoor shower, a holiday decoration made from an old whiskey barrel, various art projects, and so forth. She doesn't describe herself as an "expert" but rather as a newcomer and teacher eager to share her newly acquired knowledge as she works on new projects. Generally her projects involve woodworking, but she has done metalworking and welding as well. Many of her projects use scrap lumber; she buys new tools when she needs them, and some sponsors of her YouTube channel have sent her tools and equipment for promotional purposes. As of December 2020, her YouTube channel has over 1.3 million subscribers. Wilkerson completes many of her pieces in her 3,000-square-foot (280 m^{2}) workshop.

With Tim Allen and Richard Karn, Wilkerson co-hosts several TV series that are spiritual spin-offs of Home Improvement sitcom's show-within-a-show Tool Time. In 2021, she so costarred on Assembly Required, a series that premiered on History in February 2021. On each episode, three do-it-yourself experts undertake two rounds of building challenges, with a $5,000 prize at stake. Prior to the second round, she secretly sabotages a key item in the kits sent to the contestants, requiring them to diagnose and repair the problem in order to complete their builds. In 2022, she so costarred on More Power, a series that premiered on History in June 2022. On each episode, the three DIY experts cover the history of a tool.

In 2022 the creators of This Old House were creating a series called This Old House Makers Channel, to be aired on Roku, and Wilkerson is slotted to be one of their so-called 'Featured Makers'.

== Filmography ==
Year	Title	Role	Notes	Ref(s)
2021	Assembly Required	Co-host	Unscripted DIY-builder TV show	
2022	More Power	Co-host	Documentary TV show about tools	
