= Ingrid Carlberg =

Swedish author and member of the Swedish Academy

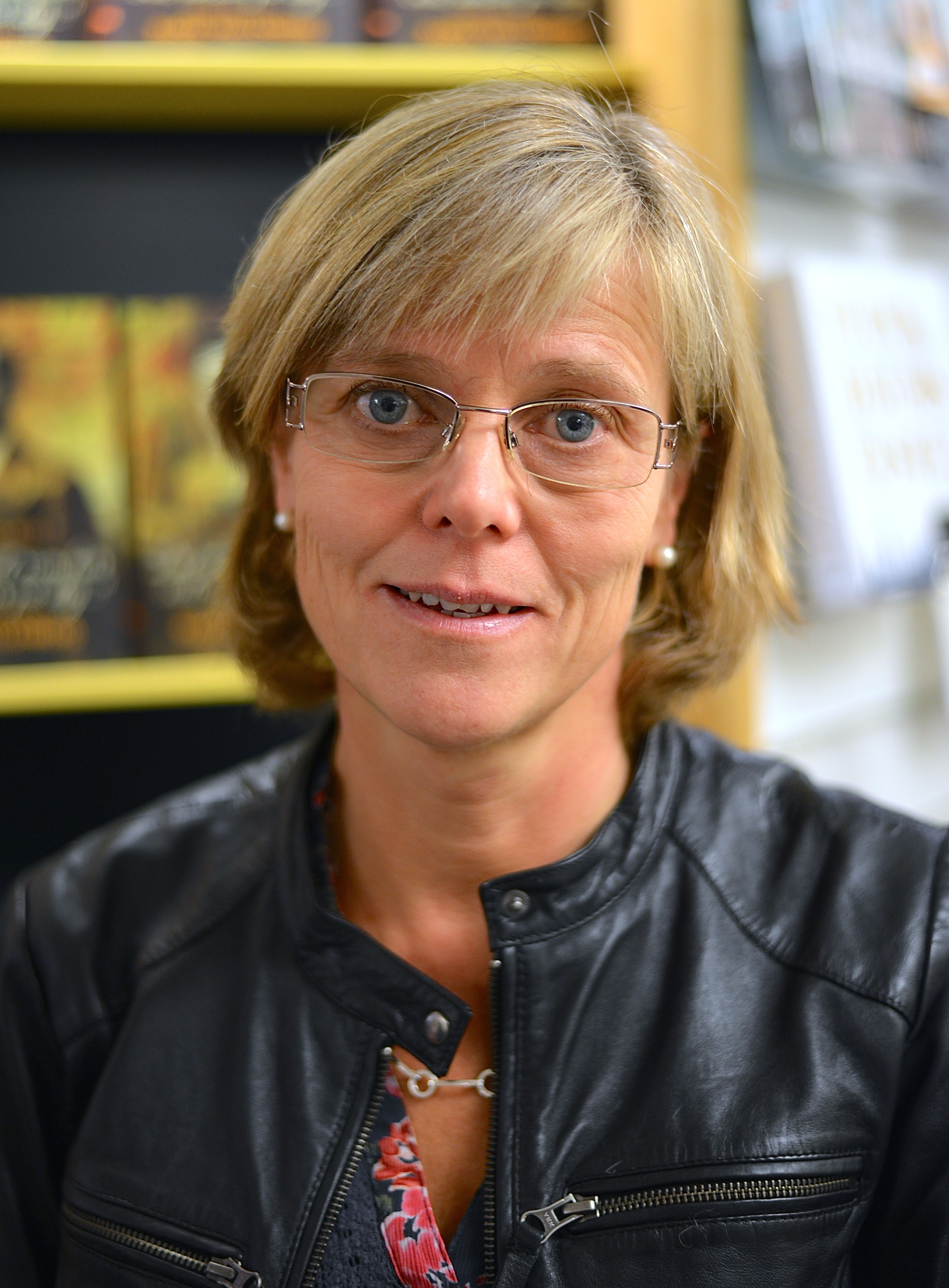
- Ingrid Carlberg in 2012
- Born: Ingrid Margareta Carlberg; 30 November 1961 (age 64); Surahammar, Sweden
- Occupations: author and journalist
- Spouse: Pär Nuder
- Children: 2

Member of the Swedish Academy (Seat No. 5)
- Incumbent
- Assumed office 15 April 2021
- Preceded by: Göran Malmqvist

Permanent Secretary of the Swedish Academy (incoming)
- Incumbent
- Assumed office 1 June 2026
- Preceded by: Mats Malm

Ingrid Margareta Carlberg (born 30 November 1961) is a Swedish author and journalist.

She was elected into the Swedish Academy on 13 October 2020, filling the last vacant post in the academy. She replaced Göran Malmqvist on chair number 5. Beginning in June 2026, Carlberg will succeed Mats Malm as the Permanent Secretary of the Swedish Academy, becoming the second woman ever to hold the office after Sara Danius.

She is married to former Swedish politician and Minister for Finance Pär Nuder. On 1 July 2021, Carlberg hosted an episode of the radio show Sommar.

== Selected works ==
- 2002 – Jag heter Rosalie, children's book (Rabén & Sjögren)
- 2003 – Rosalie på djupt vatten, children's book (Rabén & Sjögren)
- 2004 – Min bror Benjamin, YA (Rabén & Sjögren)
- 2005 – Rosalies hemliga kompis, children's book (Rabén & Sjögren)
- 2008 – Pillret, reportagebok om antidepressiva läkemedel (Norstedts)
- 2012 – "Det står ett rum här och väntar på dig ...": berättelsen om Raoul Wallenberg (Norstedts)
- 2019 – Nobel: den gåtfulle Alfred, hans värld och hans pris (Norstedts)

English translations:

- 2015 – Raoul Wallenberg: the biography (Quercus Editions)
- 2023 – Nobel: the enigmatic Alfred and his prizes (Norstedts)

Cultural offices
Preceded by Göran Malmqvist	Swedish Academy, Seat No.5; 2020–	Incumbent
