= Soul Mountain =

Novel by Gao Xingjian

- Cover of first Chinese edition, 1990
- Author: Gao Xingjian
- Translator: Mabel Lee
- Language: Chinese
- Genre: Literary modernism Semiautobiographical novel
- Set in: rural China, 1980s
- Publisher: Lianjing Chubanshe, HarperCollins
- Publication date: December 1990
- English publication date: December 5, 2000
- Media type: Print: paperback
- Pages: 616
- ISBN: 9789570836899
- OCLC: 24498893
- Dewey Decimal: 895.1352

Soul Mountain
- Traditional Chinese: 靈山
- Simplified Chinese: 灵山
Transcriptions
Standard Mandarin
- Hanyu Pinyin: Língshān
- IPA: [lǐŋ ʂán]

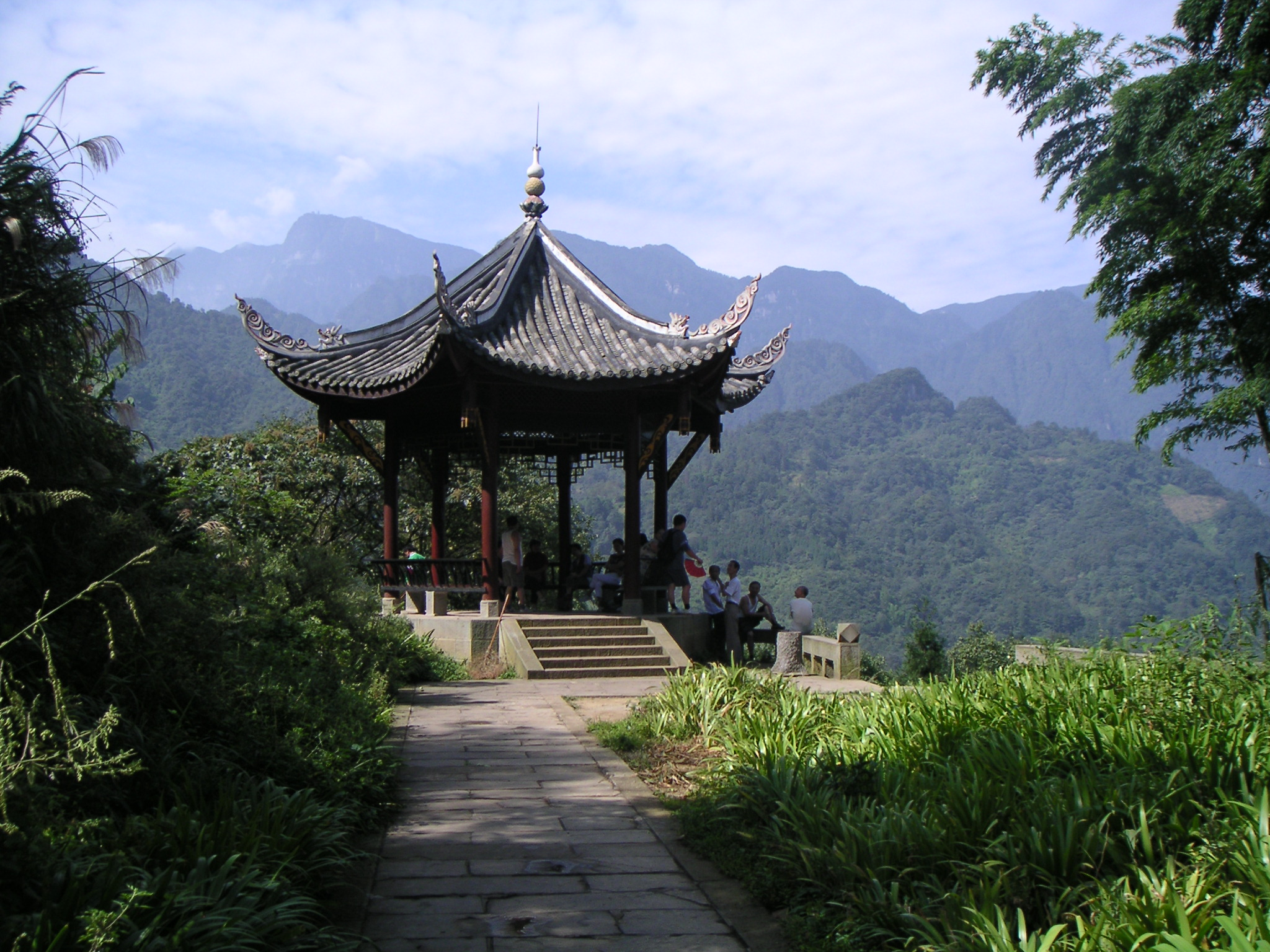
The mountains of Sichuan served as the inspiration for the novel

Soul Mountain is a novel by Gao Xingjian. The novel is loosely based on the author's own journey into rural China, which was inspired by a false diagnosis of lung cancer. The novel is a part autobiographical, part fictional account of a man's journey to find the fabled mountain Lingshan. It is a combination of story fragments, travel accounts, unnamed characters (referred to by the pronouns "I", "you", "she", etc.), and folk poetry and legends. An English version translated by Mabel Lee was published in the United States on December 5, 2000.

== Plot ==
The first of the two characters to be introduced is "You". He is described as a local tourist – "not that sort of tourist" but a backpacking one "wearing strong sensible sports shoes and a backpack with shoulder straps". He seeks out the elusive Lingshan, a sacred mountain.

"You" has long lived in the city, but yearns for a rural existence from the past He shuns the idea of settling for "a peaceful and stable existence" where one wants to "find a not-too-demanding sort of a job, stay in a mediocre position, become a husband and a father, set up a comfortable home, put money in the bank and add to it every month so there'll be something for old age and a little left over for the next generation".

"You" meets up with another wanderer, a troubled and emotional "She". And so "You"'s journey also becomes a journey into an erotic relationship. "You" also travels inwards as he explores his powers as a storyteller. Later in "You"'s story, "She" departs "as if in a story, as if in a dream".

Meanwhile, "I" is a writer and academic who travels to Sichuan after having been misdiagnosed of a terminal lung cancer. He wants to take a break and start looking for an "authentic life"—meaning the opposite of that of the state's concept of real life.

The characters' sense of humanity is revealed during their quest. "I" realizes that he still craves the warmth of human society, despite its anxieties.

=== Structure ===
Soul Mountain is essentially a two-part novel featuring two main characters—known only as "You" and "I". The "You" character occupies the odd-numbered chapters 1–31 and the even-numbered chapters from 32–80, while the "I" character's includes even-numbered chapters 2–30 and odd-numbered chapters 33–81.

== Writing process ==
=== Autobiographical influences ===
In the early 1980s, Gao Xingjian faced a great deal of criticism in the wake of the Chinese Cultural Revolution. It was during this time, in 1983, that the author was diagnosed with lung cancer during a regular health screening. With the memory of his father's death by the same cause just two years earlier still fresh in his memory, Gao resigned himself to death, which brought about a "transcendent tranquillity". However, soon after this diagnosis, an x-ray revealed that his lung cancer was non-existent. At this time Gao heard rumors of plans to have him sent to the hellish prison farms of Qinghai province, and thus quickly made the decision to flee Beijing. This decision led him to begin the journey that forms much of the autobiographical portion of the novel. The journey commences in the forests of Sichuan province and continues along the Yangtze River to the coast. The protagonist ostensively searches for Lingshan (Soul Mountain), but in fact the novel describes "one man's quest for inner peace and freedom" The journey, both in the author's life and in the narrative, include visits to the districts of Qiang, Miao and Yi, located on the fringes of Han Chinese civilization; excursions into several nature reserves; and stops at Buddhist and Daoist institutions.

=== Political and cultural influences ===
An important and critical aspect of, and influence on the novel was the political and cultural environment in which it was written. The novel was begun in 1982, shortly after the ending of the Cultural Revolution in 1976. Additionally, traditional Chinese culture promotes the Confucian ideology of dissolution of the self and promotion of subservience and conformity. The combination of traditional conformity and the "self-sacrificing" ideology of the Chinese Communist Revolution effectively silenced artists and writers who depended on their creativity of self-expression. Thus, under these circumstances, Gao Xingjian left his native country to finish Soul Mountain in 1989 in Paris, and Mabel Lee describes the novel as "a literary response to the devastation of the self".

== Publication ==
2000 cover of the English version of Soul Mountain

Soul Mountain was first published by the Taipei-based press agency Lianjing Chubanshe (聯經出版社, Linking Publishing Company) in 1990. It was then published first in Swedish 1992 by Göran Malmqvist, member of the Swedish Academy and close friend of the author; in 1995 it was translated and published into French by Liliane and Noël Dutrait by the title of La Montagne de l'âme. In 2000, it was published with an English translation by Mabel Lee, by Flamingo/HarperCollins in Australia.

Soul Mountain was included in the 2016 anthology The Big Red Book of Modern Chinese Literature by Yunte Huang, which presents itself as a definitive compilation of the most significant Chinese literary works in recent times.

== Reception ==
In a review published in 2000, after Gao's Nobel win, The New York Times said "His 81 chapters are an often bewildering and considerably uneven congeries of forms: vignettes, travel writing, ethnographic jottings, daydreams, nightmares, recollections, conversations, lists of dynasties and archeological artifacts, erotic encounters, legends, current history, folklore, political, social and ecological commentary, philosophical epigrams, vivid poetical evocation and much else."

The Times continues: "A novel in theory, 'Soul Mountain' is more nearly a collection of the musings, memories and poetic, sometimes mystical fantasies of a gifted, angry writer."

Publishers Weekly called it Gao's "largest and perhaps most personal work".

The Yale Review of Books wrote: "Blazing a new trail for the Chinese novel, Gao Xinjian's Soul Mountain combines autobiography, the supernatural, and social commentary".

The entry on the novel in Enotes notes: "While many critics have found Gao's inventive storytelling techniques to be the novel's most remarkable feature, others have found the novel to be overly self-indulgent and alienating to the reader".

The book is banned in mainland China for having content critical of the Chinese Communist Party.
