= Li Bozhao =

- 李伯钊
- Born: March 20, 1911; Chongqing
- Died: April 17, 1985; Beijing
- Education: Moscow Sun Yat-sen University
- Occupation: Playwright
- Spouse: Yang Shangkun

Li Bozhao (Chinese: 李伯钊; March 20, 1911 – April 17, 1985) was a Chinese playwright of both geju (opera) and huaju (spoken drama). She is best known for the geju Changzheng (The Long March, 1951), which contained the first depiction of Mao Zedong on stage. She was the founder of the Beijing People's Art Theatre.

Li Bozhao was born on March 20, 1911 in Chongqing, the daughter of Li Hanzhou, a county magistrate, and Yang Fengxian. Her father died when she was four and she was raised by her mother. In 1924, she enrolled in the Second Chongqing Women's Normal School, where a number of communist revolutionaries including Zhang Wentian, Yun Daiying, and Xiao Chunü taught. The next year she joined the Communist Youth League and was expelled for participating in student demonstrations. The Chinese Communist Party (CCP) sent her to Moscow in 1926 to study at Sun Yat-sen University. While studying there, she met other revolutionaries including Cai Chang, Zhou Enlai, and Yang Shangkun, whom she married in 1929.

She and her husband returned to China in 1930. She worked in education and propaganda in Fujian province, staging the huaju Mingtian (Tomorrow), about the revival of the CCP following the failure of the First United Front, and Qibing ge (The Song of the Cavalry), about the Soviet Red Army during the Russian Civil War. For the first Worker-Peasant-Soldier Congress in 1931, she produced Nongnu (Peasant Slaves, 农奴), a loose huaju adaptation of Uncle Tom's Cabin starring herself as Black Sister (Heiren mei). In Li Bozhao's version, the slaves successfully rise up against the slaveowners. Audiences often chanted "Down with slave owners!" and "Down with the landlords!" at the end of performances.

Li Bozaho was one of only thirty women to join The Long March of 1934-1936. On the March she wrote "living newspapers," propaganda performances intended to recruit illiterate peasants to their cause. She was one of seven of those women forced to travel with Zhang Guotao's Fourth Front Army after his split with Mao, separated from her husband, who remained with the First Front Army, for over a year.

In 1939, she served as president of the Lu Xun Academy of Fine Arts. Her geju called Nongcun qu (Song of the Countryside) featured peasants versus counterrevolutionary spies and traitors. She published Nü gongchandang yuan (A Female Communist) in 1948. Following the establishment of the People's Republic of China in 1949, she was the founding president of the Beijing People's Art Theatre. Her geju Changzheng (The Long March, 1951) ran for 45 seasons there. She published Huashu gou (Birch Gully) was published in 1955.

She and her husband were persecuted during the curing the Cultural Revolution. Yang Shangkun was imprisoned for twelve years while Li Bozaho was forced to clean buildings on her hands and knees, causing permanent physical damage. After they were rehabilitated, she returned to writing. Her huaju about the Long March, March Northward (Beishang), premiered in 1981, featuring a female Red Army officer, Kang Xiaomei, based on her own experiences.

Li Bozhao died on 17 April 1985 of a heart attack in Beijing.
