= One Man's Bible =

1999 novel by Gao Xingjian

One Man's Bible (simplified Chinese: 《一个人的圣经》; traditional Chinese: 《一個人的聖經》; pinyin: Yīgèrén de Shèngjīng, French: Le Livre d'un homme seul) is a novel by Gao Xingjian published in 1999 and in English translation in 2003. Set during the Cultural Revolution, the novel stars an alter-ego of Gao who reflects on his previous experiences around the world. Throughout the book, the chapters alternate between the narrator describing his life during and after his time in China during the Cultural Revolution. He describes how he looks for freedom and how to retain that freedom.

The book was originally published in Chinese in 1999. The book was later translated into English by Mabel Lee, a Chinese professor at the University of Sydney. Éditions de l'Aube published the book in French.

William John Francis Jenner writing for The Guardian said that the book "belongs to that sad class of books sold on the strength of their authors having won a prize. But a prize is rather a thin argument for reading it, especially in a wooden English translation."

== Plot Summary ==
Because the book jumps around on the timeline of the narrator's life it is difficult to give a perfectly linear plot summary.

The book opens with a nameless narrator, who is the alter ego of Gao Xingjian, who is talking about an old photo taken with family members. He reminisces how he was the only young child in the photograph and how he had to deal with many illnesses when he was young. At the same time, he declares how fragile his family is and how they progressively disappear during his lifetime.

He jumps forward in time and is now making love to a woman, who is named Margarethe, in a hotel room in Hong Kong. They discuss how they first met through a mutual friend, named Peter, and how at the time of their meeting, the narrator had had a young Chinese woman in his apartment. Margarethe asks who the girl was and he tells her that she was a nameless, young, Chinese army nurse he had been sleeping with at the time. The pair had planned to leave the country but missed each other at the airport and he boarded without her.

After this story, Gao and Margarethe discuss his missed opportunity to paint in Germany because the Chinese government would not sanction his leaving the country due to his status as a writer. Following this conversation, Gao has a dream of being back in his childhood home and interacting with relatives that have long since passed. The story jumps back to present-day Hong Kong where he meets and dines with a Mr. Zhou who is an admirer of his plays and who had a proposition for him to work in Australia which he declines. He finishes off his day by having an interview with a young journalist.

Jumping back to time, Gao describes Mao's followers as ready to go against any persons that promoted reactionary thinking or anti-communist principles. He also talks about the interrogation sessions that are held in public to force individuals to admit to any crimes against the party. Back in present-day Hong Kong, Gao talks again with Margarethe and they discuss politics and the pain of memory. He also tells her of how when he had been married he worried that his wife would report him to the authorities.

He then jumps back in time again and thinks about working with his friend Liu and then remembers all the intimate details of his affair with Lin. Lin was a respected female comrade whose family and husband were of importance to the party. Lin is described by the narrator as his first sexual encounter. He then later tries to break things off with Lin but the two cannot seem to stay away from one another. Eventually, though, they do the end the affair.

The story continues to go back and forth and throughout all of these jumps the narrator describes things he learns and experiences that marked him. Margarethe, during one of their many nights and days together, tells of how she was repeatedly raped for a long period of time while modeling for an artist. They discuss how this affects her. Gao's alter ego describes all the politics and laws that develop under Mao. He describes the dedication with which Mao's orders are carried out. At one point in the novel, he has to help his father in order to ensure he is not punished for an ancient event from his past. His father purchased a gun and never registered it so Gao's character has to find if then gun even still exists and if anyone can track it down. At other points in the story, the main character continues to describe more of his sexual encounters, which include a girl he named Xiao Xiao and the woman who would eventually be his wife for a short while. He eventually marries the woman, but the marriage quickly deteriorates because of his writing and the caution he lacks when speaking around his new bride and in the end she leaves. During his marriage, he lives in the countryside and tells tales of the people he met with there and recounts their experiences as well.

Eventually, he makes it out of China and then describes his relationship with a new girl named Sylvie that he meets in Sydney, Australia. She is carefree and does not trouble herself with things from the past. While they argue at some points, they are very passionate and that is something Gao highlights. Sylvie also shares with him the profound effect her friend's death had on her much like his own mother's death affected him.

As the novel comes to and end he updates the readers on his friends and the lovers he had kept track of in China. The narrator ends with describing his time in Perpignan, a city on the French-Spanish border. He describes the people there and then informs the reader that he is waiting for friends so that they can catch an afternoon plane.

== Characters ==
=== Gao Xingjian alter-ego ===
The main character of the story an author who tells of his life during Mao's Cultural Revolution, and afterward his life in Europe once he is exiled from his home country. He has many sexual encounters throughout the story. He describes them quite accurately. He desires to be fully free. He does not like living in the past and describes memories as nightmarish experiences.

=== Gao's Partners ===
Margarethe - A young German-Jewish woman who loves to live in the moment and would prefer to forget many of her painful memories. She is one of Gao's sexual partners and encourages his writing. She unlike Gao likes to discuss the past and memories whereas Gao dislikes living in the past. She speaks fluent Mandarin.

Lin - A Chinese woman who was Gao's first sexual encounter. While she is married, the two continue to see each other until Gao later ends it.

Sylvie - A young French girl who is very free-spirited and does not have any strong political convictions. Unlike Margarethe, she has no interest in a discussion of events that happened in the past. She is solely concerned with herself and all her emotions and her experiences. Gao makes a point of saying that she prefers her lovers to be foreigners.

== Major Themes ==
The biggest theme in the novel is freedom and how freedom is defined. The whole reason why Gao begins the novel is as a way of expressing his freedom at the advice of Margarethe. The act of writing helps the main character feel the sense of freedom he desires. In the flashbacks to his life under Mao's regime, it is very clear the lack of freedom of expression that people have in daily life. People had to live according to all the rules and regulations put in place by the Communist Party. Actions that anybody had been involved in the past could come back and cause problems for individuals who had committed them. Any actions deemed reactionary or anti-communist could be used to imprison or interrogate an individual. Throughout the novel, Gao discusses the freedom of the human spirit and how writing and his sexual encounters help to feel free and uninhibited.

Another general theme is Gao's aversion to thinking about the past or memories. He often says in the novel that memories are horrible to remember. He announces how he likes to live in the present and to that he is always alive. Memories and thinking about the past are all just means of holding him back. The women he is with are sometimes used as ways to make him feel like he is present in the moment at hand. The women he interacts with can sometimes force him to think about the past while other do not care to hear or discuss the past.

== Historical Context ==
In the novel, Gao gives little attention to the background and cause of the events taking place around him in China because of the Cultural Revolution. He wholly focuses on his experiences during the time period.

The Cultural Revolution began on May 16, 1966 and was an internal political struggle that continued for ten years. The revolution's goal was to revolt against all forms of capitalist thinking and principles. The most principal figure during this turbulent time was Mao Zedong. He was a very dominating personality and was able to promote many of his teachings, through compiling in the mandatory reading material, the Little Red Book. This time involved not only heavy oppression of freedom of expression but caused much bloodshed and the revoking of private property. Mao established the People's Republic of China in 1949. While promoting his policies, Mao also caused the deaths of many peasants, academics, any suspected spies, and any persons thought to sympathize with capitalist ways of thinking. There were also rehabilitation camps put in place to rehabilitate those who did not adhere to Communist principles.

In the novel, Gao's character talks about the actions of a group called the Red Guards and his actions while being a part of it. The Red Guards were a young adult group that would work to destroy any and all past remnants of Chinese culture. They also would deal with any persons who spoke negatively about Mao's policies. Interrogations and public demonstrations were several ways they were involved in the Communist Party
