= Buying a Fishing Rod for My Grandfather =

First edition (publ. Flamingo Books - UK)

Buying a Fishing Rod for My Grandfather, also rendered from Chinese as A Fishing Rod for My Grandpa, is a 2004 collection of six short stories by the Chinese writer Gao Xingjian. All of the stories were originally written between 1983 and 1990. The stories were translated to English by Mabel Lee.

The book was published in New York by HarperCollins, in 2004, with ISBN 0-06-057555-7, and in London as Buying a Fishing Rod for my Grandfather, translation by Mabel Lee, flamingo, London, 2004, ISBN 0-00-717038-6

== Plot ==
- In "The Temple", the narrator is on his honeymoon and mysteriously anxious despite being "deliriously happy" during his and his wife's outing.
- "In the Park" has two friends from childhood meet after many years and then part once more.
- "Cramp" has a man about a kilometer from shore on the verge of drowning barely survive, only to have no one notice he's been gone.
- "The Accident" portrays a cyclist being hit by a bus and the pedestrians' momentary reaction to the event.
- In the title story, a man sees a fiberglass fishing rod in a store window and is reminded of the times he went fishing and hunting with his grandfather.
- "In an Instant" traces the lives of three people on a typical day.

== Critical reception ==
Kirkus Reviews noted, 'The 2000 Nobel laureate’s declaration “that his fiction does not set out to tell a story” is supported by the six tales in this first translated collection. That aesthetic is thus summarized by scholar Lee, who has translated Gao’s ramshackle major novels Soul Mountain (2000) and One Man’s Bible (2002) and now these terse chamber pieces, which appeared separately during the years 1983–91 and together as part of a larger Chinese language collection. They’re generally “about” individual experiences seen in relation to larger contexts.'

The anonymous reviewer concluded, "Inconsistently developed, but precisely detailed and delicately suggestive: the best work of Gao’s yet to appear in English translation".
