= Bus Stop (dance) =

Type of line dance

The bus stop is a type of line dance that was originated in 1975 in Los Angeles at a disco becoming a national hit the following year. The dance is combination of steps, turns and dances often using their feet.
