= Beijing Capital Theatre =

Coordinates: 39.9202°N 116.4054°E

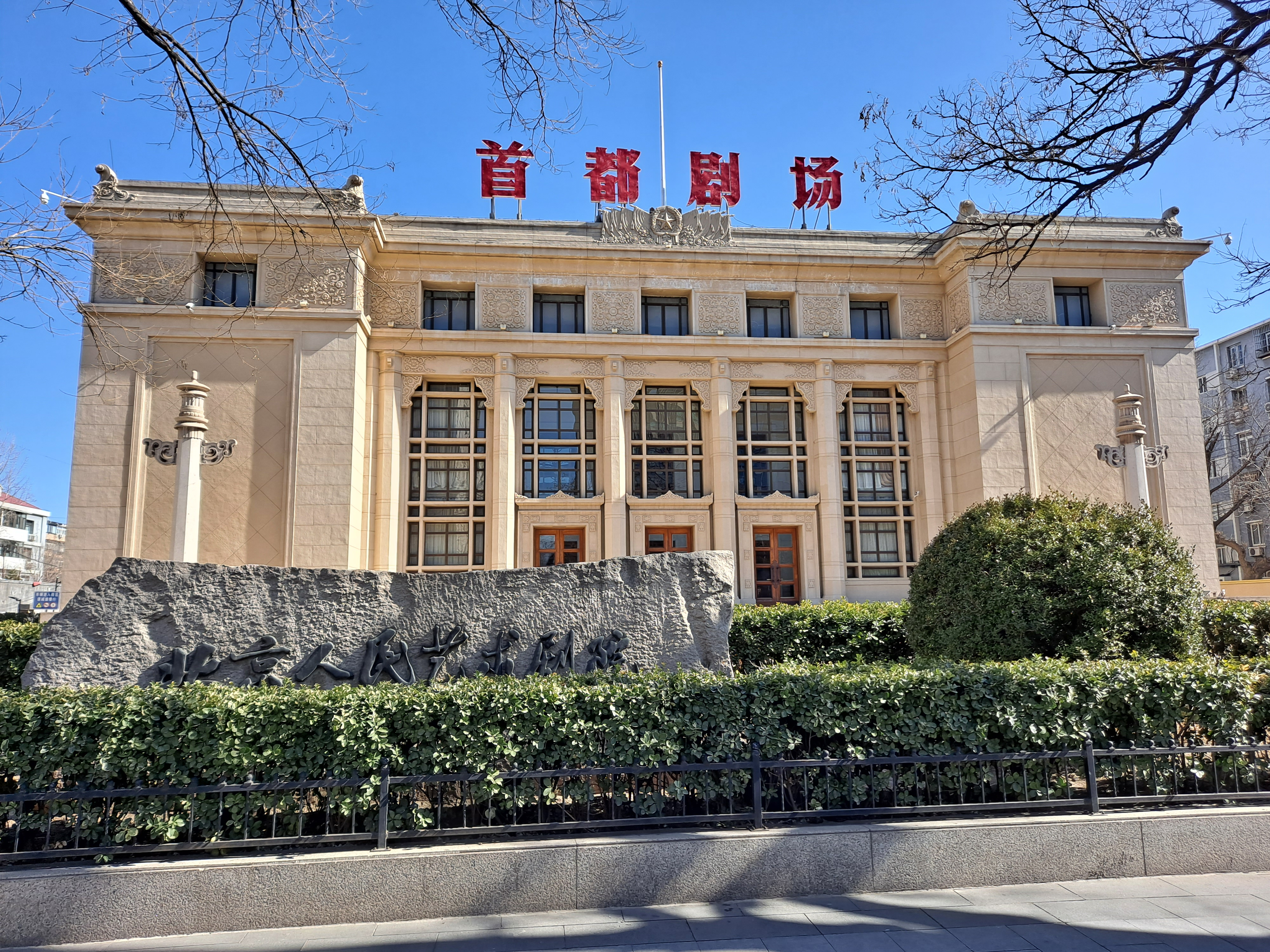
The Beijing Capital Theatre

The Beijing Capital Theatre (北京首都剧场) is a theatre and performance hall located near the Wangfujing in downtown Beijing. The theatre was built in 1954, and was one of Beijing's most famous performance art venues. Many plays performed by domestic as well as foreign theatre companies are often held at the Capital Theatre. Its head company since 1956 has been the Beijing People's Art Theatre troop.
