= The Bus Stop =

Play by Gao Xingjian

The Bus Stop is a Chinese absurdist play written in 1981 by Gao Xingjian. Though originally completed in 1981, a second draft wasn't completed until 1982, and the play was not performed on stage until 1983. The play premiered at the Beijing People's Art Theatre and was directed by Lin Zhaohua, the Deputy Director of the People's Art Theatre. Though appreciated by many audiences, the original run was shut down by the Anti-Spiritual Pollution Campaign after only 13 performances. Now banned from performance in mainland China, The Bus Stop remains an influential text in Chinese absurdist drama.

== Characters ==
Gao uses nothing more than the characters' age to introduce them.

- Silent Man – a middle aged man
- Old Man – in his sixties
- Girl – twenty-eight years old
- Hothead – nineteen years old
- Spectacles – thirty years old
- Mother – forty years old
- Carpenter – forty-five years old
- Director Ma – fifty years old

A parenthetical after the list of characters in the text reads: "the ages listed represent each character's age at his or her first appearance."

== Plot ==
The play opens on "imagine you're at a bus stop in the suburb of a city."

The first character to enter is the Silent Man, soon after the Old Man. 30 minutes after girl got on the bus The Girl and the Hothead enter next, and the Hothead sits on the railing despite the Old Man's protests. When Glasses, the Mother, and the Carpenter enter, the Old Man does his best to keep everyone in an orderly line. A bus approaches the station, but drives by without stopping. While the Old Man, the Mother, the Hothead, and Glasses argue about the queue, another bus zooms by without stopping. This unstoppable bus prompts the Hothead to begin fighting with Glasses. The Silent Man and the Carpenter separate the two, and everyone at the station falls back in line.

At this point in the play, characters begin to reveal why they're going into city. The Mother explains how her husband and child live in the city, and her work can't be transferred to the city because "you've got to have connections." The Old Man reveals that he's going into town for a chess game, and the Girl bashfully admits she's headed into town to meet a young man. The Carpenter adds that he's going to town to continue making fine furniture, and Glasses says he's on his way to take the college entrance exam. The Director Ma then enters just as another bus whizzes past. The Director Ma discloses that he is the manager of the general supplies store and has bribed the bus company with cigarettes, yet still can't get on the bus. While the Old Man and the Director Ma discuss cigarettes and language, Glasses begins studying American English words such as pig, dog, book, and desk. Amidst scattered conversation, the Silent Man takes off walking towards the city – "a painful yet determined search."

As the Mother and Girl complain about having to wait for the bus, Glasses notices that his watch indicates that a year has passed. The Director Ma claims that he was going into town for a party, but he can drink booze at home; he doesn't leave the bus stop, however. The Old Man announces that he's going into town to play the chess champion Li Mosheng in a game of chess, and Glasses worries that he's wasted his youth waiting for the bus and not taking the college exam. The Director Ma attempts to rally the troops to walk back to the country, but the Hothead insists on having a test of city yogurt. The strangers then realize that the Silent Man has left them, and they hypothesize about the man's identity.

The Director Ma remembers that his son is getting married back in the country, and asks the Carpenter whether or not he could produce some fine furniture for his son. After the Hothead suggests that he and Glasses walk to the city, Glasses decides to flip a coin to decide whether they walk or stay, but the Girl stops him before he can look because she's scared of her own fate. Upon the arrival of another bus, the group decides to block the bus's path by standing in the road. The bus does not so much as slow down, however, and the civilians flee back to the bus stop. The Director Ma threatens to leave once more, but stays. At this point, Glasses' watch lets us know that ten whole years have passed. Each character worries about what they've missed in the last ten years. The Girl and the Mother describe dreams that they've had and embrace due to their own dissatisfactions with life.

The Hothead tries to instigate a gambling card game, but is ultimately shut down by the Carpenter, who slaps him. When the gang gets ready to walk to town, the Director Ma claims that he forgot to take his medicine back in the country and finally walks back. It begins to rain, and everyone huddles under a plastic sheet that the Carpenter pulls out of his bag. As Glasses goes to take the Girl's hand, the Old Man suggests that the Hothead get a job as the Carpenter's apprentice, and the Mother recounts her story about a stranger in the rain. The Director Ma returns, and the rain turns to snow. When the rain stops, the characters notice a sign on the bus stop that most likely once stated that the bus stop was no longer operational – they've waited for nothing. The characters then become actors watching from the outside much like audience members. They question why these characters are wasting their lives waiting. The characters then return to their original characters and start walking towards the city.

== Performance ==
The Bus Stop premiered in the Loft Space of the Beijing People's Art Theatre in 1983. Gao's collaborator and Deputy Director of the Beijing People's Art Theatre, Lin Zhaohua, directed the production. Zhaohua had worked with Gao earlier in 1983 on Gao's work Warning Signal, and the two agreed to stage a production of Bus Stop that same year.

Before each production of Bus Stop, Lu Xun's play, The Passerby, was performed. The run of Bus Stop was originally advertised at 17 performances, and even before the opening night of the play, every performance was sold out. The run of the show did not last 17 shows, however. While it's popular opinion that Chinese officials shut down the run after 10-13 performances (it's also unclear whether Bus Stop ran 10 or 13 performances), it's also possible that the run was cut short so that the actors could perform Warning Signal in Dongbei. A reprisal of Bus Stop was then scheduled for a month later, but canceled due to controversy and a lack of support from the government.

Despite the Chinese government's disapproval of the piece, audiences were quite enthralled with the production. In various talkbacks following the performance, audience members expressed a familiarity with the sentiments expressed in the work – they saw themselves in the play.

In June 2021, the Crane Creations Theatre Company led a Play Date of The Bus Stop. The Play Date is a play reading event held monthly to spread awareness of playwrights and playwrighting from around the world. A group of professional theatre artists discussed about the theme, style, form, and world issues related to The Bus Stop.

== Style ==
The style of Bus Stop has been compared to Waiting for Godot, Chekhov, and Brecht. Another theory indicates that The Bus Stop may be Gao Xingjian's interpretation of Lu Xun's The Passerby. In Waiting for Godot by Samuel Beckett, characters similarly wait for something that never comes. Chekhov's plays also feature a desire for a better life through change in location, and Brecht uses a similar alienation effect. Brecht's Verfremdungseffekt, or alienation of the audience, featured song, dialogue delivered to the audience, and characters becoming actors. In a very Brechtian way, Gao allows his characters to become actors in order for the audience to view the play with a critical and distant eye. Unlike Brecht, however, Gao plays with the idea of the "tripartite actor." The "tripartite actor" plays three roles: his or her true self, his or her self as an actor, and the actor as a character. Brecht's actors were merely actor and character.

In the notes at the end of the play by Gao, Gao suggests that the play "aims to combine dramatic action and inaction." Another theory indicates that The Bus Stop may be Gao Xingjian's interpretation of Lu Xun's The Passerby. Gao goes on to state that the music and sound effects are just as important as the dialogue, however he doesn't mention anything about set, costumes, or props. In thus neglecting these aspects, Bus Stop focuses on the live body of each actor. Without any spectacle to distract, the audience is given no choice but to focus on the actions and bodies of the characters.

Another aspect of Gao's writing is "multivocality," or polyphonic dialogue. In Gao's notes, Gao explains that there are occasionally many characters speaking at once. He instructs the actors to speak at varying volumes and pitches. The main idea should be the loudest, but it's truly at the director's discretion. An example lies towards the end of the play, when there are essentially seven performers speaking at once.

== Political backlash ==
The post-Maoist Chinese government had many issues with Gao Xingjian's Bus Stop. The first problem was the Brechtian, absurdist style. Socialist-realist and naturalist theatre were the most popular forms of theatre in China at the time, mainly due to the government's support. Konstantin Stanislavski and Henrik Ibsen would show China in a good light; Gao's unpredictability would not. The Bus Stop was quickly labeled "spiritual pollution" by the Anti-Spiritual Pollution Campaign and in 1984, future performances of Bus Stop were banned.

The second problem that the government had with Gao's writing was his sense of camaraderie, or working together for a better future. In Bus Stop, it appears important to be able to not only take care of one's self but also work together with other for a better future. The government saw this as potentially dangerous, for the last thing wanted was a political uprising.

Bus Stop furthermore addressed the issue of backdoorism. In China at the time, many wealthy folks could bribe to government for this and that, and occasionally would give the government money for unknowingly nothing in return. When the Director Ma talks about giving cigarettes to the bus company, he is essentially a victim of this abusive backdoorism system. Gao's critique of the issue is just another problem that the Chinese government had with the play.
