= Taiwan Panorama =

Taiwanese state media

- April 2024 cover page, "Taiwan welcomes Mazu"
- Categories: Culture, Politics, Economics
- Frequency: Monthly
- Publisher: Ministry of Foreign Affairs
- Founded: Government Information Office
- First issue: January 1976
- Country: Taiwan
- Based in: Taipei
- Language: English, Chinese, Japanese, Vietnamese, Thai, and Bahasa Indonesia
- Website: taiwan-panorama.com
- ISSN: 2412-4060

Taiwan Panorama (traditional Chinese: 台灣光華雜誌; simplified Chinese: 台湾光华杂志; pinyin: Táiwān Guānghuá Zázhì) is a multilingual monthly magazine published in Taiwan. It was founded as Sinorama Magazine (Chinese: 光華雜誌) in 1976 and renamed in 2006. The magazine is published by the Ministry of Foreign Affairs to promote Taiwanese culture.

== History ==
The magazine was founded as Sinorama Magazine in January 1976, and was published by the Government Information Office. In 2006, it was renamed as Taiwan Panorama.

In 2015, the magazine, originally published by the Ministry of Foreign Affairs in Chinese, English and Japanese, also began to be published in Vietnamese, Thai, and Bahasa Indonesia. The magazine is available in more than 100 countries across the world, offering writing, photographs, and in-depth reports on Taiwan's ongoing political, economic, social, and cultural evolution.

In 2018, according to a Foreign Affair Ministry spokesperson, the Southeast Asian edition of Taiwan Panorama magazine has a circulation of 2,000 copies for each language edition per issue, mainly provided to embassies and consulates, public libraries, and immigrant organisations or distributed in government events. Taiwan Panorama ended its print edition in July 2026, maintaining an online publication.
