= The Other Shore =

Play by Chinese Writer Gao Xingjian

- Original language: Chinese, tr. by G. C. Fong
- Written by: Gao Xingjian
- Genre: Symbolism; Chinese drama
- Setting: "From the real world to the non-existent other shore"

The Other Shore (Chinese: 彼岸; pinyin: bǐ'àn; untoned Bi An; previously translated The Other Side) is a play by the Chinese writer Gao Xingjian. It was first published into English in 1997 and translated again in 1999.

The intended premiere of The Other Shore under the direction of Lin Zhaohua at the Beijing People's Art Theatre had its production shut down by the Chinese government before it reached performances. The playwright proceeded to direct productions of the play at the Taiwan National College of Art in 1990 and at the Hong Kong Academy for Performing Arts in 1995.

== Interpretation ==
Although The Other Shore has been performed internationally, much of the meaning of the play is dependent on specifically Chinese cultural concepts. The title is a literary way of saying "the opposite bank of a river", but also refers to an element of Buddhism known as paramita (the "perfection" of a virtue), this "other shore" representing a state of enlightenment which everyone wants to reach. However, Gao's philosophy specifically inverts this hopeful worldview by proclaiming in his opening stage directions that the action takes place on "the non-existent other shore". The illusion of enlightenment is not to be reached by play's end (or at least, not the enlightenment that was sought).

== Performance space ==
The Other Shore is also notable for its performance space requirements. Most likely influenced by the French Avant Garde movement, with which Gao was familiar, the playscript states that:

The play can be performed in a theatre, a living room, a rehearsal room, an empty warehouse, a gymnasium, the hall of a temple, a circus tent, or any empty space as long as the necessary lighting and sound equipment can be properly installed. Lighting can be dispensed with if the play is performed during the day. The actors may be among the audience, or the audience among the actors. The two situations are the same and will not make any difference to the play.

== Reception ==
Attending the 2003 Sons of Beckett Theatre Company performance directed by Jerry Wienckowski, Les Spindle praised "Xingjian's timelessly compelling vision, a plea for human liberty and peace. [...] Though the scenes seldom progress in a logical fashion, the cumulative impact is alternately chilling and humorous. The dysfunctional interactions suggest the ill effects of political anarchy and the equally treacherous prospect of inefficient or self-serving rulers."

== Translations ==
- 1997: as The Other Side: A Contemporary Drama Without Acts, tr. by Jo Riley, in An Oxford Anthology of Contemporary Chinese Drama, 1997, ISBN 0-19-586880-3
- 1999: as The Other Shore, tr. by Gilbert Chee Fun Fong, in The Other Shore: Plays by Gao Xingjian, 1999, ISBN 962-201-862-9
