= Beijing People's Art Theatre =

Beijing theatre company

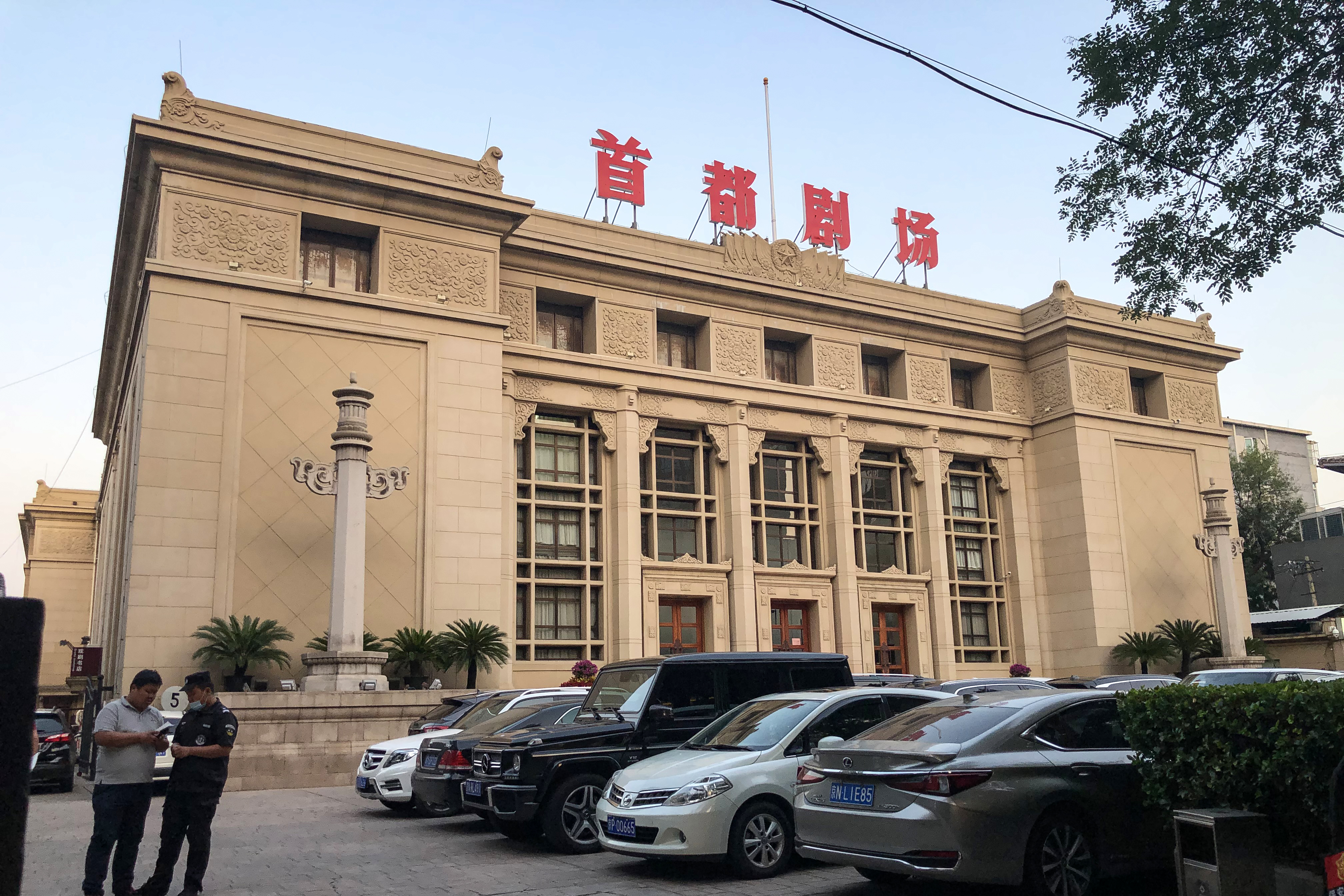
The Capital Theatre in Beijing has been the home of the Beijing People's Art Theatre since 1956.

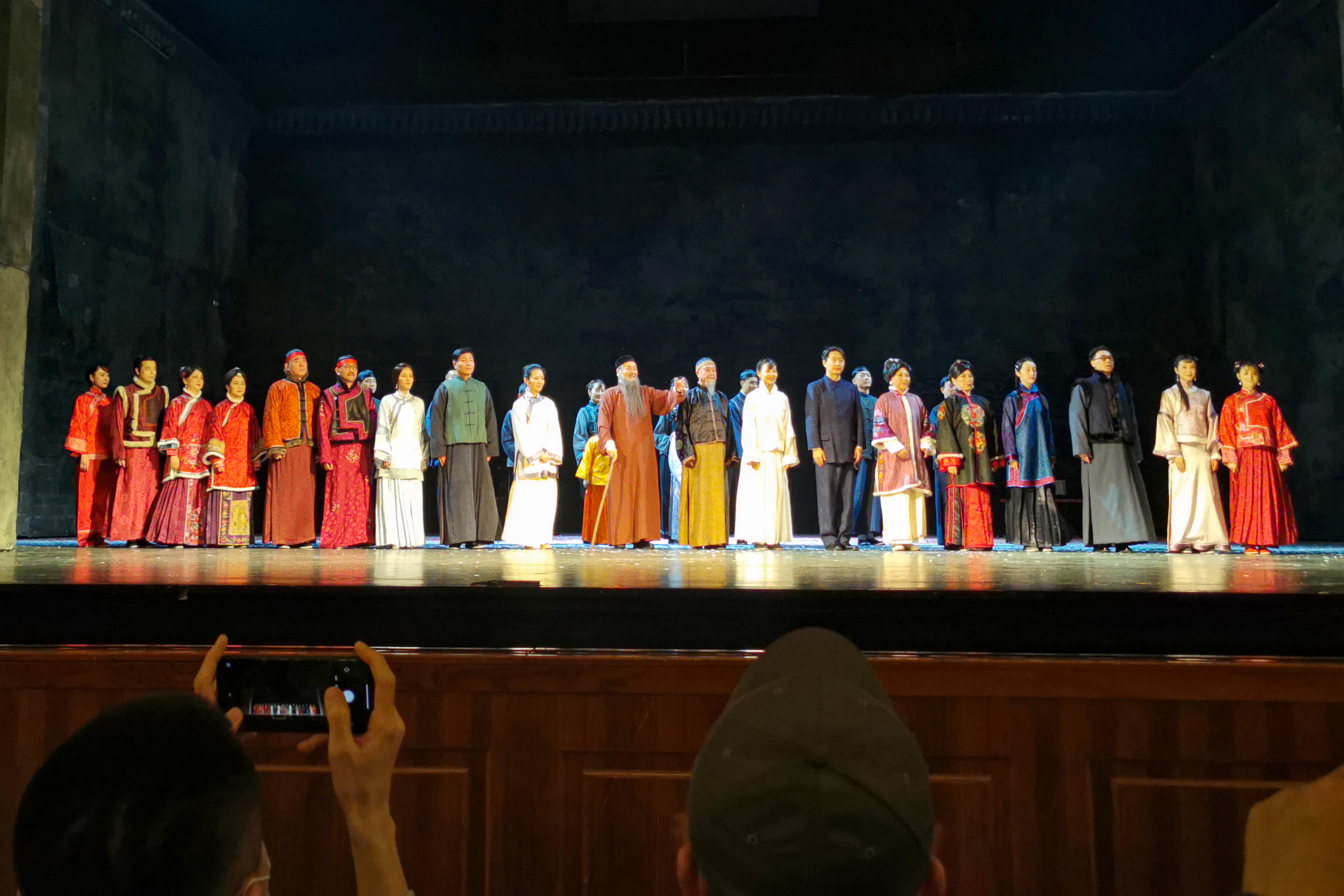
Cast of Home, Cao Yu's 1942 adaptation of Ba Jin's novel Family, by the Beijing People's Art Theatre in 2020

Beijing People's Art Theatre (北京人民艺术剧院/北京人民藝術劇院) is a theatre company in Beijing. Its predecessor was a comprehensive arts theatre of the same name established in 1950, with Li Bozhao as president. The present spoken-drama company was established on 12 June 1952, when the drama section of the earlier theatre merged with the repertory troupe of the Central Academy of Drama, with playwright Cao Yu as its first president. Since its founding, the company has produced nearly 300 dramas of different styles, from classic Chinese themes to adaptations of Molière. The theater company is under the Beijing Municipal Committee of the Chinese Communist Party and is based in the Capital Theatre in Beijing.

Through the 1960s, it was known primarily for staging the representative works of master playwrights Guo Moruo, Lao She, Cao Yu and Tian Han. Since the 1980s, the theater has introduced nearly 80 new dramas by 27 award-winning playwrights, including Signal Alarm, the first play written by Gao Xingjian, and his most celebrated drama Bus Stop.

In 1980, the company toured outside China for the first time, performing Lao She's masterpiece "Tea House", the company's signature work, in Japan and Western Europe. The company broke more new ground in 1983 when it invited playwright Arthur Miller to direct a production of what was seen at the time as a uniquely American drama "Death of a Salesman," an experience Miller recounted in the form of a day-to-day diary in his book Salesman in Beijing (1985).

In 2005, the company made its United States debut with productions of "Tea House" at the John F. Kennedy Center for the Performing Arts and the Michael Schimmel Center for the Arts at Pace University in New York City.

== History ==
The predecessor of Beijing People's Art Theater was the theater of the same name established in 1950. On January 1, 1950, the People's Art Theater of Beijing was established, this is a comprehensive nature of the national theater, creative performance opera, dance, drama, music and dance program, Li Bozhao as president. In 1952, the drama part of Beijing People's Art Theatre merged with the Central Academy of Drama Repertory Theatre to become the new Beijing People's Art Theatre (established on June 12, 1952). In 1953, the Song and Dance Theatre affiliated with the Central Academy of Drama was transformed into the Central Experimental Opera House, and in 1958 it was divided into the China Opera and Dance Theatre and the Central Opera and Dance Theatre (later renamed the China National Opera).

In the early days of the People's Republic of China, the Ministry of Culture of the Central People's Government held a working meeting in Beijing in June 1951. In December 1952, the Ministry of Culture of the Central People's Government issued a directive on rectifying and strengthening the work of national opera troupes. We will gradually build theater art." In December 1952, the Ministry of Culture of the Central People's Government issued a directive on rectifying and strengthening the work of national opera troupes. We will gradually build theater art."

On January 1, 1950, Beijing People's Art Theatre was established. It is a comprehensive national theatre, producing operas, dances, plays and music and dance programmes. Li Bazhao is the president. In the spring of 1952, the opera company, folk song and dance troupe and orchestra of Beijing People's Art Theatre merged with the opera company, dance company, orchestra and two performing departments and administrative departments of the Central Academy of Drama. In 1953, the Song and Dance Theater affiliated with the Central Academy of Drama was independent from the establishment of the Central Academy of Drama. In 1958 it was renamed "Central Opera and Dance Theatre". In 1964, according to Zhou Enlai's spirit of "divide first and unite later", part of the Chinese Opera and Dance Theater was established, and the rest of the main body was still called the Central Opera and Dance Theater. In 1979, the Central Opera and Dance Theater was renamed the China National Opera.

During the Cultural Revolution, the compound, like other opera troupes throughout the country, was damaged. After the Gang of Four was smashed, the establishment of the Central Opera House and its creative activities resumed.

In 2009, the Central Opera House launched its first international opera season.

Construction of the new theater of the Central Opera House began in 2010 and was completed in March 2022.

== Successive presidents ==
- Li Bozhao (1950–1952, President of Beijing People's Art Theater)
- Li Bozhao (1952–1953, Director of the Song and Dance Theater Affiliated to the Central Academy of Drama)
- Zhou Weizhi (1953–1955, Director of the Central Experimental Opera House)
- Lu Su (1955–1958, Director of the Central Experimental Opera House)
- Lu Su (1958–1963, Director of the Central Opera and Dance Theater)
- Liu Lianchi (March 1978 – 1988)
- Wang Shiguang (November 1988 – 2000)
- Chen Xieyang (2000–2002)
- Liu Xijin (2002-February 2009)
- Yu Feng (February 2009-February 2016)
- Liu Yunzhi (October 2018 to present)
