= Göran Malmqvist =

Swedish linguist (1924–2019)

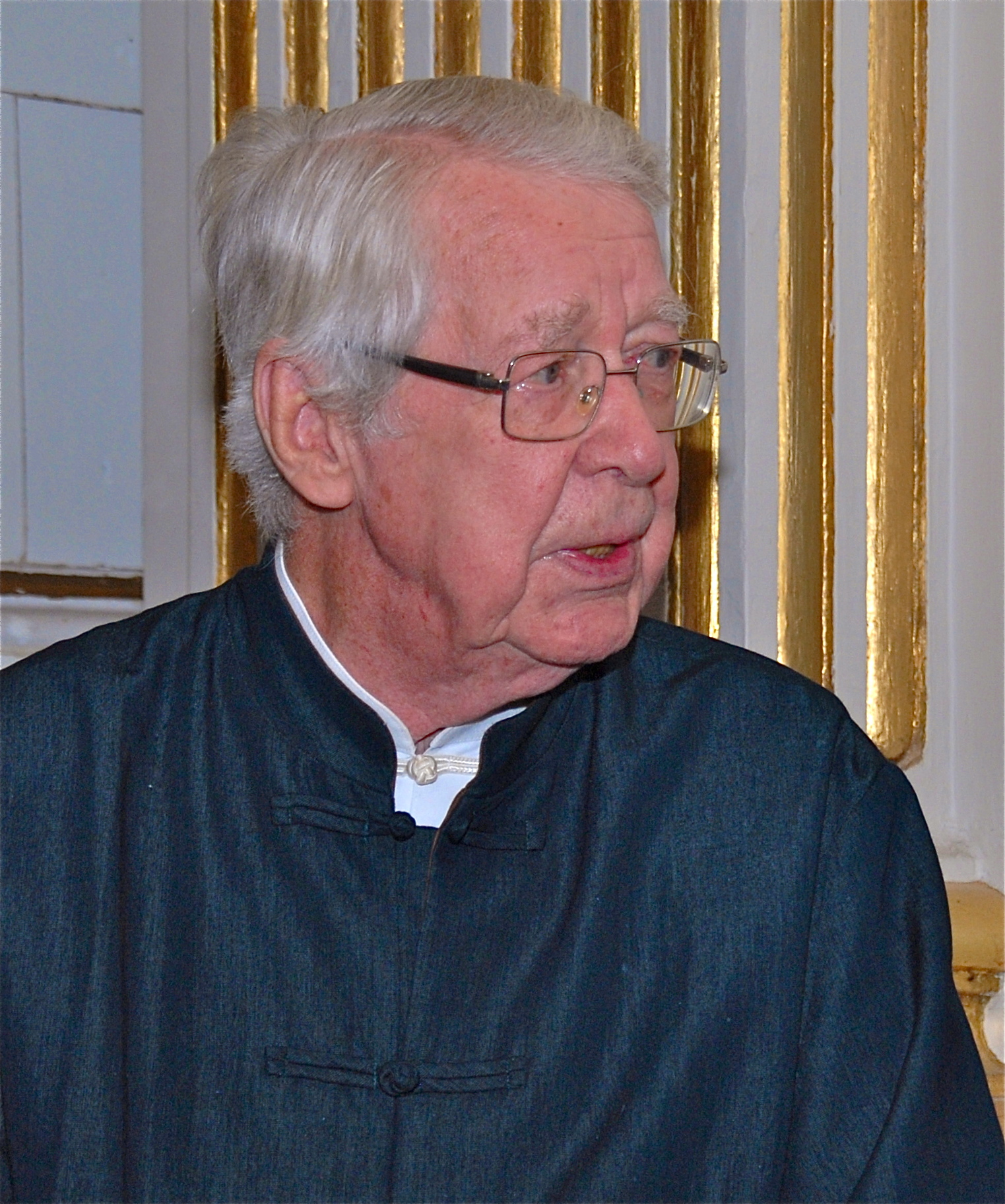
- Malmqvist in 2011
- Born: Nils Göran David Malmqvist; 6 June 1924; Jönköping, Sweden
- Died: 17 October 2019 (aged 95)
- Education: Stockholm University
- Scientific career
- Fields: Ancient Chinese history, literature
- Workplaces: Australian National University; Stockholm University
- Doctoral advisor: Bernhard Karlgren

Member of the Swedish Academy (Seat No. 5)
- In office 20 December 1985 – 17 October 2019
- Preceded by: Henry Olsson
- Succeeded by: Ingrid Carlberg

Nils Göran David Malmqvist (6 June 1924 – 17 October 2019) was a Swedish linguist, literary historian, sinologist and translator. He was also a member of the Swedish Academy between 1985 and 2019.

== Biography ==
Göran Malmqvist was born on 6 June 1924, in Jönköping, Sweden. Following introductory studies of Chinese under Sinologist Bernhard Karlgren at Stockholm University, Malmqvist studied in China in 1948–1950. He then returned to Stockholm, taking a Licentiate of Arts degree in 1951. His international research career started shortly thereafter with a lectureship in Chinese at the University of London in 1953–1955. He was then appointed Swedish cultural attaché in Beijing and worked in China in 1956–1958.

=== Academic career ===
After his years in China he moved to Australia in 1958, where he worked for seven years at the Australian National University in Canberra. After some important essays on Chinese language history he was appointed Professor of Chinese at the university in 1961. During his professorship at the Australian National University, Malmqvist published academic articles on both old Chinese and modern Chinese. The articles concerned e.g. phonological issues and literary dialects during the Han dynasty, the syntax of bound forms in Sïchuanese and western Mandarin phonology.

=== Writing and translation ===
In 1965, Malmqvist was called to Stockholm as Professor of Sinology, particularly Modern Chinese, at the newly established Section of Chinese in the Department of Oriental Languages at Stockholm University. Back in Stockholm, his career as a translator also began, with a series of interpretations of Tang dynasty lyrics in the anthology Det förtätade ögonblicket (The compact moment). Malmqvist translated more than 40 volumes of Chinese literature from different epochs, different Chinese varieties, and different literary genres.

In 1971, Malmqvist published several textbooks including Nykinesisk grammatik (Grammar of Modern Chinese) and Nykinesisk fonetik (Phonetics of Modern Chinese), a number of translations, chiefly in the academic journal Orientaliska studier (Oriental studies), and the large section on Chinese literature 500–1779 in the joint Nordic Litteraturens världshistoria (World history of literature). This was followed in 1973 with the section on The literature of China 1780–1890 and Chinese literature 1890–1965. The same year he published the translation of Lao She's short stories in Det sorgsna skrattet (The sorrowful laugh). In 1974, Malmqvist published the popular volume Kinesiska är inte svårt (Chinese isn't difficult).

During the 1970s, he was also working on the translation of the over thousand page picaresque novel Shui Hu zhuan. The Swedish title is Berättelser från träskmarkerna (Tales from the swamps) and the work appeared in four volumes between 1976 and 1979. He also translated the five volumes of Xī Yóu Jì (Journey to the West, with the Swedish title Färden till västern), a 16th-century story of how in the 7th century the pilgrim Xuanzang brings the holy writings of Buddhism from India to China. During the 1970s and 1980s, Malmqvist's research turned chiefly to classical Chinese philology, syntax and semantics.

=== Swedish Academy ===
Göran Malmqvist was elected to the Swedish Academy on 11 April 1985 and admitted on 20 December 1985. Malmqvist succeeded the literary historian Henry Olsson to Chair number 5. From the time after his election to the Swedish Academy, the over five-hundred page biography on his teacher Bernhard Karlgren was of particular note: Bernhard Karlgren – ett forskarporträtt in 1995; (Bernhard Karlgren – portrait of a scholar). Malmqvist here follows Karlgren's path through the pioneering era of Sinology from his early dialectological fieldwork in China in 1910–1912, which aimed at reconstructing the sound pattern of ancient Chinese.

Following the awarding of the Nobel Prize to Chinese author Mo Yan in 2012, Malmqvist was criticized for a possible conflict of interest, as he had close personal and economic relations to Mo Yan. Malmqvist had translated several of Mo Yan's works into Swedish and published some through his own publishing house. Mo Yan had also written a laudatory preface to one of Malmqvist's own books, and been a close friend of Malmqvist's wife for 15 years. The Nobel committee denied that this constituted a conflict of interest, and said that it would have been absurd for Malmqvist to recuse.

== Bibliography ==
- Det förtätade ögonblicket: T'ang-lyrik (1965)
- Problems and methods in Chinese linguistics (1964)
- Han phonology and textual criticism (1963)
- Gunnar Martins samling av kinesisk och japansk litteratur (1947)
- 111 nykinesiska satsmönster (1973)
- Nykinesisk grammatik (1973)
- Kinesiska är inte svårt (1974)
- Nykinesisk fonetik (1974)
- Nykinesiska satsmönster (1981)
- Vägar till Kina: Göran Malmqvist 60 år (1984)
- Henry Olsson: Inträdestal i Svenska akademien (1985)
- Bernhard Karlgren: Ett forskarporträtt (1995)
- Nio röster från Taiwan: Modern kinesisk poesi (1999)
- Haiku för ros och oros skull (2002)
- Strövtåg i svunna världar (2005)
- Guldfisken som älskar att sjunga Mozart (2013)

== Notes ==
Cultural offices
| Preceded by Henry Olsson | Swedish Academy, Seat No.5; 1985–2019 | Succeeded by Ingrid Carlberg |
