= List of Home Improvement episodes =

Home Improvement is an American sitcom television series created by Carmen Finestra, David McFadzean, and Matt Williams and starring Tim Allen that originally aired on ABC from September 17, 1991 to May 25, 1999. A total of 204 22-minute episodes were produced, spanning eight seasons.

== Series overview ==
Season	Episodes	Originally released		Rank	Viewers (millions)
Season	Episodes	First released	Last released	Rank	Viewers (millions)
1	24	September 17, 1991	May 5, 1992	4	28.9
2	25	September 16, 1992	May 19, 1993	3	31.5
3	25	September 15, 1993	May 25, 1994	2	35.2
4	26	September 20, 1994	May 23, 1995	3	32.9
5	26	September 19, 1995	May 21, 1996	7	25.9
6	25	September 17, 1996	May 20, 1997	9	23.1
7	25	September 23, 1997	May 19, 1998	10	19.5
8	28	September 22, 1998	May 25, 1999	10	17.7

== Episodes ==
=== Season 1 (1991–92) ===
No. overall	No. in season	Title	Directed by	Written by	Original release date	Prod. code	US viewers (millions)
1	1	"Pilot"	John Pasquin	Carmen Finestra & David McFadzean & Matt Williams	September 17, 1991	5100	28.0
Jill has a job interview and tells Tim not to touch and wreck the dishwasher in the meantime. Nevertheless, he does, gets an electrical shock, and destroys the dishwasher. Jill does not get the job. Taking Wilson's advice, Tim apologizes in a subtle manner on his next Tool Time episode, and Jill forgives him.
2	2	"Mow Better Blues"	John Pasquin	Elliot Stern	September 24, 1991	A304	28.1
After Mark breaks one of Tim's oldest tools, he fears the worst when Brad and Randy fabricate a story about the traded son "Peter," who was given away because he wrecked Tim's tools. Meanwhile, Tim modifies his riding lawnmower.
3	3	"Off Sides"	John Pasquin	Marley Sims	October 1, 1991	A302	26.8
Tim and Jill want to go out and have a romantic evening, but Jill can't find a babysitter, so she hires a magician (Eric Christmas), who messes up during a trick and locks himself in a trunk, leaving the kids on their own around the house. During their romantic dinner, Tim is distracted by a Detroit Lions game, much to Jill's irritation.
4	4	"Satellite on a Hot Tim's Roof"	John Pasquin	Allison M. Gibson	October 8, 1991	A305	27.7
Tim tries to put up a satellite dish that has over 200 channels so he can watch sports games around the country and is jealous when Jill's teacher (Sam McMurray) comes to the house and promptly starts making romantic advances on Jill.
5	5	"Wild Kingdom"	John Pasquin	Susan Estelle Jansen	October 15, 1991	A303	25.7
Brad and Randy hear a rustling in the basement, and Tim dismisses it as a peaceful mouse, until Randy finds a snakeskin. Tim has a huge fear of snakes and doesn't want to deal with the issue, but Jill pushes him to because Mark's Cub Scout troop is coming over.
6	6	"Adventures in Fine Dining"	John Pasquin	Peter Tolan	October 22, 1991	A301	25.4
Jill makes a bet with Tim that he cannot teach the kids some manners after they are kicked out of a pizza parlor. If Tim cannot teach the boys manners, he will be attending the opera for an entire year with Jill, much to Tim's horror. With the bet on, he tries his best to make the boys behave.
7	7	"Nothing More Than Feelings"	John Pasquin	Peter Tolan	October 29, 1991	A306	27.5
Jill drives with the oil light on for three days and Tim mentions this on Tool Time. Jill gets angry at Tim for mocking her on his own show. Randy believes his hands are just like a girl's hands, and Mark and Brad take advantage of this information.
8	8	"Flying Sauces"	John Pasquin	Billy Riback & Elliot Stern	November 5, 1991	A309	26.3
Workers from the K&B Construction Site come and show how to cook food using tools. Brad and Randy convince Mark that he's adopted, and then make up a story that everybody around him are aliens. To get back at the boys, Tim, Jill and Mark dress as aliens and scare them.
9	9	"Bubble, Bubble, Toil and Trouble"	John Pasquin	Susan Estelle Jansen	November 19, 1991	A310	27.5
Tim tries to renovate his and Jill's bathroom and involves Tool Time crew members as well as Al to make it free except for the construction material. The project turns out to take longer than expected, taking 18 days, much to Jill's dismay. Brad attempts to ask out Jennifer, his longtime crush, on a date.
10	10	"Reach Out and Teach Someone"	John Pasquin	Allison M. Gibson	November 26, 1991	A311	27.6
Tim and Jill get in an argument after Tim tries to teach her plumbing. To prove he can be a reasonable teacher, Tim invites women on Tool Time to teach them basic household maintenance. Meanwhile, Brad thinks he will do terribly on a test when Randy calls him an idiot. Tim begins working on his vintage 1930s hot rod.
11	11	"Look Who's Not Talking"	John Pasquin	Billy Riback	December 10, 1991	A307	27.3
Jill has to present a speech to the Library Association and is beginning to have stage-fright. Tim and Mark dress up as women to help her practice while trying to clean the house.
12	12	"Yule Better Watch Out"	John Pasquin	Billy Riback	December 17, 1991	A312	30.2
Tim is competing in the neighborhood's annual Christmas Lighting Contest, and is trying to outdo his rival, Doc Johnson. Brad and Randy tell Mark that Santa Claus died before he was born, but a mysterious Santa (Earl Hindman) gives him his wish. Brad and Randy get meager parts in a Christmas play.
13	13	"Up Your Alley"	John Pasquin	Billy Riback & Elliot Stern	January 7, 1992	A314	31.3
It's family night, and Tim decides to take the family bowling. Jill believes Tim gets too intense during bowling, so they don't keep score, but soon it turns into an all-out competition as Tim tries to impress the boys from K&B Construction who are bowling in the lane next to them. Brad and Randy encounter an arcade bully.
14	14	"For Whom the Belch Tolls"	John Pasquin	Sheila M. Anthony	January 14, 1992	A308	31.2
Stu Cutler (Christopher McDonald), Tim's old college buddy, comes to town and visits the Taylor's. Unfortunately, Stu starts to annoy Tim and Jill because he acts like he and Tim are still in college, and Tim has to set him straight.
15	15	"Forever Jung"	John Pasquin	Carmen Finestra & David McFadzean & Matt Williams	January 21, 1992	A313	32.1
Karen (Betsy Randle), Jill's friend, visits, and Tim has to tolerate and stand up to her constant comments about his masculinity and his own tool show. Because of this stress, Tim accidentally glues his forehead to a table. Meanwhile, Jill teaches Brad how to dance, because he will be attending Jennifer's parents' anniversary party.
16	16	"Jill's Birthday"	John Pasquin	Rosalind Moore	February 4, 1992	A315	30.9
When Tim finally thinks he has the perfect birthday gift for Jill, it backfires, and he must find a new one. In order to fund Jill's present after blowing their money on a baseball card, Brad and Randy lie to Mark about a "Little Brother's Tax" and they take all his money.
17	17	"What About Bob?"	John Pasquin	Susan Estelle Jansen	February 11, 1992	A317	28.6
At John Binford's insistence, Bob Vila guest stars on Tool Time, and is participates in a game called "Stump the Toolman" with Tim. Randy gets in trouble for picking on a kid at school, and Jill forces him to invite the boy over, only to realize he is as annoying as Randy claims.
18	18	"Baby, It's Cold Outside"	John Pasquin	B. K. Taylor	February 18, 1992	A318	30.9
Tim and Jill's romantic getaway is ruined when Tim's boss, John Binford, demands Tim take his family camping using the new Binford camping gear, and share clips of their time on Tool Time. The trip doesn't go quite as Tim planned it would. Brad competes with another boy for Jennifer's Valentine's Day heart.
19	19	"Unchained Malady"	John Pasquin	Billy Riback	February 25, 1992	A319	28.7
Tim throws out a chain letter from Al and receives bad luck continuously. Randy breaks his bike after participating in a dare. Tim dyes his hands green, and Jill accidentally punches him, giving him a black eye. George Foreman guest stars as himself on Tool Time.
20	20	"Birds of a Feather Flock to Taylor"	John Pasquin	Marley Sims	March 3, 1992	A320	30.7
Tim is convinced Jill never told him about an opera fundraiser they're going to, prompting an all-out argument between the two. All the while, Tim helps Mark build an elaborate bird house. Jack Elam and Ernest Borgnine portray old-timers.
21	21	"A Battle of Wheels"	John Pasquin	Laura Eve Anderson	March 17, 1992	A321	31.8
Jill begins pottery class, and begins to practice in the garage where Tim is working on his hot rod. This causes friction between the couple, but it all gets worked out, in part because of Wilson's advice. Meanwhile, after embarrassing Al following a mistake during an episode, Tim lets Al be the host of Tool Time for a day. It doesn't end well, and the two switch back to their normal roles.
22	22	"Luck Be a Taylor Tonight"	John Pasquin	Allison M. Gibson & Marley Sims	April 7, 1992	A316	27.6
Tim's all-men-poker-night is ruined when Jill's sister Robin (Amy Ryan) and her husband Charlie (Tom Verica) come and have a big fight, thus causing disruptions in the game.
23	23	"Al's Fair in Love and War"	John Pasquin	Elliot Stern	April 28, 1992	A322	30.0
Al is too nervous to ask Greta Post (a previous guest of "Tool Time") out, so Jill suggests he invite her to a barbecue at the Taylor house. Tim gives Al bad advice that leads him to lose Greta, causing a friction between the two. Tim tries to get a hold of Jill's college diary. Jill discovers something about the effects of Jennifer and the boy's manners.
24	24	"Stereo-Typical"	John Pasquin	Carmen Finestra & David McFadzean & Matt Williams	May 5, 1992	A323	31.2
Tim purchases a new stereo set, which causes problems because of how complicated it is to use.

=== Season 2 (1992–93) ===
No. overall	No. in season	Title	Directed by	Written by	Original release date	Prod. code	US viewers (millions)
25	1	"Read My Hips"	John Pasquin	B. K. Taylor	September 16, 1992	A324	29.6
Jill has planned a romantic surprise dinner for Tim, who is at Big Mike's with Al and the guys from K&B Construction. He phones home and she flirts with him, and he doesn't notice and comes home two hours late. Jill is upset and accuses him of not picking up all the signals she sends. Tim thinks that signals should be clear and dresses up as Fred the phone repairman so he can fix the problem. Meanwhile, Brad is wondering whether Jennifer punching him is a sign that she wants to kiss him.
26	2	"Rites & Wrongs of Passage"	John Pasquin	Susan Estelle Jansen	September 23, 1992	A326	29.5
After Brad pulls a prank at school and is grounded by Jill, Tim is going to let him off the hook and go to a planned truck rally, until Brad is brought home by a cop for throwing bricks at a greenhouse and Tim then decides not to take him. Wilson tells Tim that Brad is rebelling because he believes he should be his own man. Tim teaches Brad to behave again while they work on his hot rod together, while Jill takes the rest of the boys to the rally and comes home partially deaf.
27	3	"Overactive Glance"	John Pasquin	Billy Riback	September 30, 1992	A327	27.3
Jill and Karen think that Tim will look at any woman in a restaurant, after they see him checking out a woman on Tool Time. Randy has trouble playing football. Tim's solution? Super glue.
28	4	"Groin Pains"	John Pasquin	Howard J. Morris	October 7, 1992	A325	28.9
Tim pulls a groin muscle when trying to impress Jill with his masculinity by carrying a big trunk of books. Randy plays Peter Pan in the school play, but the school doesn't have the necessary machine for him to fly, but Tim has an elaborate idea.
29	5	"Heavy Meddle"	John Pasquin	Rosalind Moore	October 14, 1992	A328	28.7
When Tim has a get-together with some of his friends to celebrate putting in the hot rod's engine, Jill decides to hook her friend Karen up with Tim's single friend Dave, and ends up ruining Tim's day with her interference. Meanwhile, the boys have problems with the McGurn brothers.
30	6	"The Haunting of Taylor House"	John Pasquin	Susan Estelle Jansen	October 28, 1992	A331	29.6
Brad and Jennifer plan to dress like Raggedy Ann and Raggedy Andy on Halloween, but she shows up with another boy named Danny and is instead dressed like him. After Danny tries to ruin Tim's "Catacombs of Terror", Tim (Nanastein) scares him away with the help of Al and Wilson.
31	7	"Roomie for Improvement"	John Pasquin	Billy Riback	November 4, 1992	A332	26.7
When Mark contracts chicken pox, Jill forces Tim to move out for a few days, since he has never had it. Al then offers for Tim to stay with him, and although he doesn't want to, he decides against hurting Al's feelings, which he does anyway when he embarrasses Al severely on Tool Time in front of special guests Mario and Michael Andretti.
32	8	"May the Best Man Win"	John Pasquin	Maxine Lapiduss	November 11, 1992	A329	28.2
When John Binford marries a young, hot tool model, he assigns his daughter Maureen as the producer of Tool Time, who Al fully supports, but Tim is unhappy when she begins making changes to the show. Meanwhile, Tim is forced to take over the house when Jill unexpectedly gets a job as a researcher for a magazine, and Tim is weirdly left without advice when Wilson is more eager to take a herb bath than help Tim with his predicament.
33	9	"Where There's a Will, There's a Way"	John Pasquin	Howard J. Morris	November 18, 1992	A333	28.4
Jill decides it's time for her and Tim to complete their wills, which Tim does not want to be part of because of his fear of mortality. Mark, after overhearing the wills being discussed, fears that his father is going to die. Brad and Randy build a human catapult and need a victim for their experiment.
34	10	"Let's Did Lunch"	John Pasquin	Howard M. Gould	November 25, 1992	A330	32.4
Dave puts Tim in an uncomfortable position by asking Tim to tell Karen that they had lunch one day, even though they didn't. When Tim tells Jill about the secret, he learns Jill has been holding a secret for Karen at the same time. The boys built a catapult in order to launch garbage into the McGurns' yard to avenge all of their cruel pranks.
35	11	"Abandoned Family"	John Pasquin	Rosalind Moore	December 2, 1992	A334	32.7
When Jill gets to research the cover story for the magazine, Tim takes over the house; however Jill is frustrated with the way Tim operates the house when he "improves" the washing machine and dryer, forgets to make the boys' lunches and fails to make Mark's gingerbread house for the bake sale.
36	12	"I'm Scheming of a White Christmas"	John Pasquin	B. K. Taylor	December 16, 1992	A335	31.7
Brad and Randy start soliciting donations from the neighborhood for charity and are great successes; however, when presented with the amount of money that they collect the boys can't help themselves and keep some of the money to buy comic books and Game Boy games. Guest stars: The Manhattan Transfer
37	13	"Bell Bottom Blues"	John Pasquin	Susan Estelle Jansen	January 6, 1993	A336	33.4
Tim complains to Jill that she has too many things in their closet, so she starts cleaning it out - but when all she throws away is a pair of pants and a single shoe, Tim decides to remodel the closet to have enough space. Meanwhile, Brad tries to con his parents into signing a "field trip release form" without them knowing that it's actually a note from school explaining that Brad punched a kid at school because Tim unknowingly embarrassed him in front of all his friends.
38	14	"Howard's End"	Andy Cadiff	Stacey Hur	January 13, 1993	A337	34.9
Jennifer is going away on holiday, so she leaves her goldfish Howard in the care of Brad, who accidentally kills the fish, and now he has to buy a new fish before Jennifer finds out. Tim and Jill get into a fight over who owns what when Jill opens a private checking account for herself.
39	15	"Love is a Many Splintered Thing"	Andy Cadiff	Billy Riback	January 20, 1993	A338	30.3
Jill takes a compatibility test from the magazine, and the results show that her and Tim are not compatible. In revenge, Tim creates a test that intentionally shows that Jill is not the woman for him. Meanwhile, Randy wants to perform a ventriloquism act for the school talent show, but he discovers that it's harder than it looks.
40	16	"Dances with Tools"	Andy Cadiff	Rosalind Moore	February 3, 1993	A339	34.4
It's the Taylors' anniversary. Tim bribes Mark to tell him where the present Jill has bought for him is, and after discovering that it's the steering wheel from Mario Andretti's race car, he decides to get her ballroom dancing lessons; however, he ruins the experience for Jill by making fun of the dancing, making sarcastic comments about the other dancers and spinning the teacher right into the piano, sending her to the hospital.
41	17	"You're Driving Me Crazy, You're Driving Me Nuts"	Andy Cadiff	Maxine Lapiduss	February 10, 1993	A340	42.8
One of Jill's cousins is getting married, but Tim gets lost on the way and refuses to get directions, which leads them to end up in Ohio. Meanwhile, Karen babysits the boys, and they cheat her in go fish.
42	18	"Bye Bye Birdie"	Andy Cadiff	Susan Estelle Jansen	February 17, 1993	A341	30.5
A woodpecker arrives at the Taylor household, and Tim goes crazy trying to get rid of it. Brad and Jennifer break up, and after he flunks a math test, he blames it on his being lovesick. However, when Jennifer drops by and gives Brad his workbook, revealing that she had been doing his homework and thus explaining why Brad failed the test (Brad gets grounded as a result), Tim and Jill are forced to tutor Brad to get his grades up again.
43	19	"Karate or Not, Here I Come"	Andy Cadiff	Billy Riback	February 24, 1993	A342	30.4
Hoping to boost Mark's confidence when Brad and Randy continue to disallow him to play with them and their friends, Tim and Jill put him into a karate class, after an influence from a wood-breaking demonstration on Tool Time. However, a boy starts bullying Mark at the karate lessons, leading to a fight between Jill and the boy's mother.
44	20	"Shooting Three to Make Tutu"	Andy Cadiff	Howard M. Gould	March 3, 1993	A343	25.5
Jill's computer crashes, so she has to go into work and recreate her research paper, forcing Tim to take Mark to Swan Lake instead of her. Tim reluctantly agrees, but when Wilson gives him front-row courtside seats to the Pistons game, he decides to leave the ballet after thirty minutes and go to the game instead. This angers Jill, and she tells Tim she wants Mark to have these experiences because Mark is the only one of the boys who likes the things Jill likes. Brad and Randy are left home alone, time they spend smoking one of Tim's cigars from his stash.
45	21	"Much Ado About Nana"	Andy Cadiff	Howard J. Morris	March 17, 1993	A344	37.1
Jill's mother, Lillian (Polly Holliday), comes to visit for Mark's birthday. She comes bearing gifts: a drum set for Mark, and a family heirloom for Jill. But instead of the antique clock that she loves and really wanted, Lillian gives her a tea set, disappointing Jill until Lillian explains why she was given the tea set and not the clock.
46	22	"Ex Marks the Spot"	Andy Cadiff	Darrel Campbell & Billy Riback	April 14, 1993	A345	35.2
When Tim's high school girlfriend Stacey Lewis returns to town, Jill invites her over to have dinner at the Taylors' household, which leads to Stacey revealing an unpleasant secret about Tim's past with her, embarrassing Tim and putting him into an uncomfortable situation with Jill.
47	23	"To Build or Not to Build"	Andy Cadiff	Robert Zappia	May 5, 1993	A348	34.1
For Mother's Day, Tim decides that each of the boys will build something for Jill. Brad and Mark succeed in making jewelry and recipe boxes; however, the more unskilled laborer Randy does not want to build anything, since he is not interested in tools, so Tim consults Wilson and his mother about what to do about Randy.
48	24	"Birth of a Hot Rod"	Andy Cadiff	Steve Gabriel	May 12, 1993	A346	33.0
Jill asks Tim to fix the ice dispenser on the refrigerator, replace the knob on the back door and repair the burner on the stove, but all he is interested in is getting his hot rod's engine to turn over. Jill calls a repairman, but Tim distracts him with the hot rod, leaving Jill angry.
49	25	"The Great Race"	Andy Cadiff	Carmen Finestra & David McFadzean & Matt Williams	May 19, 1993	A347	31.5
Bob Vila reappears on Tool Time and challenges Tim to a lawnmower race for charity. Determined to beat Vila once and for all, Tim inserts a jet engine from a helicopter into the lawnmower. Meanwhile, Brad and Randy create "The Tadpole Secrecy Test" for Mark, who wants them to play with him. The test involves Mark holding a live tadpole in his mouth for three seconds, but he accidentally swallows it.

=== Season 3 (1993–94) ===
No. overall	No. in season	Title	Directed by	Written by	Original release date	Prod. code	US viewers (millions)
50	1	"Maybe, Baby"	Andy Cadiff	Bob Bendetson	September 15, 1993	A349	36.5
Jill learns her sister Carol is having a baby girl. While going through the boys' baby things, Jill wishes she could have a baby girl, putting Tim on edge because he doesn't want another child. After seeing a pink blanket Jill knitted when she was pregnant with Mark, Randy and Brad tell Mark that Jill wished he had been a girl. This upsets Mark and when Jill wants to bake a cake with him he resists, which confuses Jill. On Tool Time, Lisa leaves the show for college, so Tim and Al welcome Heidi, who becomes the new Binford Tool Girl.
51	2	"Aisle See You in My Dreams"	Andy Cadiff	Elliot Shoenman & Marley Sims	September 22, 1993	A350	25.5
Al wishes for a wife on his 35th birthday, so Jill fixes him up with Ilene Markham. After Al proposes to her on Tool Time very quickly, Jill urges Tim to talk to Al about not moving so fast. Randy and Brad write a letter to Mark pretending to be Isiah Thomas, so Tim and Jill tell Mark to get revenge.
52	3	"This Joke's for You"	Andy Cadiff	Howard J. Morris	September 29, 1993	A353	30.1
Tim stops telling jokes and screwing up on Tool Time after he installs an intercom and hears Randy making fun of the show. Hurt, he grounds Randy as a result. Brad wants to read David Copperfield so he can talk to Jennifer, but he finds out it's not about the magician and Jennifer breaks up with him, which hurts Jill more than Brad.
53	4	"A Sew, Sew Evening"	Andy Cadiff	Rosalind Moore	October 6, 1993	A352	34.6
Tim has trouble with Joe Morton (Robert Picardo), his annoying new neighbor, after Joe dents the grill of his hot rod so to get rid of him, Tim makes up lies about Jill, claiming she's a depressed alcoholic. Jill becomes good friends with Marie Morton, Joe's wife. Brad signs up for home economics as his elective to meet girls, but his plan goes awry when every other boy in school does the same thing as Brad, filling the class with boys instead of girls.
54	5	"Arrivederci, Binford"	Andy Cadiff	Elliot Shoenman	October 13, 1993	A351	32.0
Tim is afraid to cry after John Binford, his boss and close friend, dies from a heart attack. Brad, seeing this, believes men are not allowed to cry at all and starts to show off his masculinity.
55	6	"Crazy for You"	Andy Cadiff	Bob Bendetson	October 27, 1993	A354	40.7
It's Halloween, and Tim is up to his old tricks, however Jill plans a prank of her own on Tim. Tim gets cookies from a fan named Rose, but soon strange things start happening. She keeps calling him, and Wilson thinks she is obsessed with him. Tim tries to hide but it's no use.
56	7	"Blow Up"	Andy Cadiff	Rosalind Moore & Howard J. Morris	November 3, 1993	A355	35.8
After forgetting to blow up a nice picture of Jill for a dinner in her honor, Tim uses the only picture he can find at the last minute - Jill's driver's license picture, completely humiliating her. Meanwhile, Al takes the boys miniature golfing and ends up being banned for life after throwing a fit after Brad gets a hole-in-one and beating Al at the game.
57	8	"Be True to Your Tool"	Andy Cadiff	Bruce Ferber	November 10, 1993	A356	32.9
Wes Davidson, the new president of Binford, forces Tim to promote a new saw tool on Tool Time, but Tim pushes back because the tool is poorly made with cheap materials. When Davidson threatens Tim's job if he doesn't endorse the saw, Tim has to choose between his job and his principles. Meanwhile, the boys go grocery shopping and find a way to save money to buy junk food.
58	9	"Dollars and Sense"	Andy Cadiff	Bob Bendetson & Bruce Ferber	November 17, 1993	A358	36.4
The boys buy a one-of-a-kind remote-controlled car with stock bonds from their grandmother, but they can't resist the temptation of racing it - until the car is run over by a truck.
59	10	"Frozen Moments"	Andy Cadiff	Max Eisenberg	November 24, 1993	A357	34.7
On Thanksgiving, Tim wants the perfect Christmas card, so he builds a Christmas Village in the backyard and has the family wear costumes, annoying Jill in the process because she just wants something simple.
60	11	"Feud for Thought"	Andy Cadiff	Elliot Shoenman & Marley Sims	December 1, 1993	A359	40.0
At her high school reunion, Jill tries to avoid Joanie Graham (Lee Garlington), her high school best friend who stole her boyfriend, and learns a shocking truth about her and Jack (who had dumped Jill for Joanie). Meanwhile, Al watches the boys and Brad's girlfriend Ashley (Leigh Ann Orsi), and finds himself overwhelmed and outnumbered until he gets some much needed help from Wilson.
61	12	"'Twas the Blight Before Christmas"	Andy Cadiff	B. K. Taylor	December 15, 1993	A361	35.2
Tim tries to beat Doc Johnson in the neighborhood Christmas Lighting Contest, but Randy is inadvertently leaking information to Doc's granddaughter on whom he has a crush. Brad wants to go skiing with a friend's family on Christmas instead of spending it with his family, which leads to him causing problems when Tim and Jill tell him no.
62	13	"Slip Sleddin' Away"	Andy Cadiff	Rosalind Moore & Howard J. Morris	January 5, 1994	A360	39.1
Randy loses a sled race to neighborhood bully Vinnie McGurn. But after getting help from Tim with upgrading his sled for a rematch race, Randy falls off his sled and sprains his wrist, compelling Tim and Jill to have a conversation about accepting challenges. Meanwhile, Brad contemplates stopping his saxophone lessons since he thinks he'll never be good at it.
63	14	"Dream On"	Andy Cadiff	Paul Wolff	January 12, 1994	A362	40.9
Al doesn't want to come to dinner with the Taylor's after Ilene has a dream about Tim riding on a golden stallion in tight bicycle shorts, and after Tim reveals the dream to everyone at the dinner, Ilene dumps Al for betraying her, causing friction between Al and Tim.
64	15	"Reel Men"	Peter Filsinger	Ron Bloomberg	January 26, 1994	A363	43.8
While Jill is having Ilene and Marie over for a pamper day, Tim goes ice fishing with Al to an ice shed Al is interested in buying. Problems ensue when they have trouble catching fish, Tim drops Al's family heirloom chisel down the fishing hole, and Tim falls through the ice, losing the car keys in the process. Gilligan's Island is mentioned.
65	16	"The Colonel"	Andy Cadiff	Rosalind Moore & Howard J. Morris	February 9, 1994	A365	41.0
Jill has a hard time telling her father, the army colonel, the truth when he asks her opinion on his boring book. Meanwhile, Tim builds a hockey puck shooter to help Randy with his hockey skills.
66	17	"Room for Change"	Andy Cadiff	Jon Vandergriff	March 2, 1994	A367	30.4
Tim makes Jill angry when he makes the decision to have Mark move into Randy's room without consulting her after Randy and Brad continuously fight. The reason why Brad and Randy have been fighting is more than either Tim or Jill anticipated.
67	18	"The Eve of Construction"	Andy Cadiff	Rosalind Moore & Howard J. Morris and Elliot Shoenman & Marley Sims	March 9, 1994	A366	44.0
Jill joins Al's team for a Habitat for Humanity build because Tim thinks married couples shouldn't work together. Tim tries to beat Jill's team with an all star athlete construction team directed by himself. Meanwhile, Brad finds a locket and gives it to Ashley, but finds out it was Marie's. Note: This was the most viewed episode of the series.
68	19	"Too Many Cooks"	Andy Cadiff	Bob Bendetson & Bruce Ferber	March 16, 1994	A364	38.9
Tim and Al are asked to be guest chefs on Cooking with Irma while Irma is away. Tim has a hard time not being the star when Irma asks Al to be the head chef while Tim assists him, but when Jill points out how well he can help her when she's cooking dinner, he decides to continue to help Al when it becomes apparent Al is struggling as the main host. Randy finds it hard to talk to a girl in his class named Beth (Anndi McAfee) and asks Jill for advice.
69	20	"It Was the Best of Tims, It Was the Worst of Tims"	Andy Cadiff	Rosalind Moore & Howard J. Morris	March 30, 1994	A368	39.9
After Tim charms all the women at a baby shower, Jill wants a romantic evening with him, but Tim's uncouth behavior after returning from a demolition derby with the boys ruins Jill's mood.
70	21	"Fifth Anniversary"	Andy Cadiff	Howard Bendetson & Art Everett	April 6, 1994	A369	37.7
After destroying his budget for 6 months on the Man's Kitchen, Tim struggles to find a good idea for his anniversary show. Jill tries to get guests for a no dinner dinner fundraiser but finds it particularly difficult when no one understands the concept.
71	22	"Swing Time"	Andy Cadiff	B. K. Taylor	May 4, 1994	A371	34.4
Tim and the boys plan on getting Jill a hot tub for Mother's Day by getting rid of the swing set so they can install the hot tub in their yard. But they discover the swing set meant more to Jill than they thought and she prefers an herb garden instead of a hot tub. Tim faces off with the new foreman of K&B Construction, a female named Les (Victoria Principal).
72	23	"What You See is What You Get"	Andy Cadiff	Tim Allen & Diane Ford	May 11, 1994	A370	26.3
After reading a story about a woman whose husband left her because of her appearance, Jill thinks Tim wants her to have cosmetic surgery, especially after Tim makes a comment about how women "let themselves go after childbirth". Meanwhile, Mark beats Brad and Randy in a video game and chess.
73	24	"Reality Bytes"	Peter Filsinger	Matthew Miller & Barrie Nedler	May 18, 1994	A372	24.7
Randy, pretending to be thirty-two years old, meets a woman on an online singles messaging board, and she comes by for a surprise visit. Meanwhile, Tim tries to help Mark with his solar system science project but has trouble resisting the temptation to completely take over. The Crew of the Space Shuttle mission STS-61 appears on Tool Time as guests.
74	25	"The Great Race II"	Andy Cadiff	Jon Vandergriff	May 25, 1994	A373	25.6
After Bob Vila raises more money than Tim for Jill's library fundraiser, Tim challenges him to a hot rod race against Bob's 1934 Roadster. The only problem: Tim's hot rod isn't finished.

=== Season 4 (1994–95) ===
No. overall	No. in season	Title	Directed by	Written by	Original release date	Prod. code	US viewers (millions)
75	1	"Back in the Saddle Shoes Again"	Andy Cadiff	Bruce Ferber	September 20, 1994	A501	36.1
Jill is laid off from her job, and decides to go back to college to get her Master's Degree in psychology. Tim is skeptical and unsupportive of Jill's plan, which angers her. In the end, Tim has a conversation with Wilson where he's able to understand Jill's reason for wanting to go back to school.
76	2	"Don't Tell Momma"	Andy Cadiff	Rosalind Moore & Howard J. Morris	September 27, 1994	A504	35.0
Tim is annoyed when he finds a scratch on Jill's vintage Chevrolet Nomad that she tried to fix with nail polish, and insists that he take it to Eddie's body shop to be fixed, but first he drives it to work on a special Tool Time episode in a construction yard where he drops a three-ton steel beam on the car. He doesn't tell Jill the truth, but she sees the car in the body shop when she goes to retrieve a book from it and also finds out that Tim had told Eddie that Jill had caused the damage. Brad and Randy prepare to stop the bus bully (by gluing his butt to one of the seats), but they get caught and are kicked off the bus.
77	3	"Death Begins at Forty"	Andy Cadiff	Bob Bendetson	October 4, 1994	A503	33.5
Tim becomes concerned about his health around his 40th birthday after witnessing Harry, the owner of Harry's Hardware, having a heart attack. Tim cancels his birthday plans but feels better after receiving advice from a heart-attack survivor and a clean medical report. Tim and Al shrink down to view a car engine.
78	4	"The Eyes Don't Have It"	Andy Cadiff	Jon Vandergriff	October 11, 1994	A505	34.2
Mark has recently been having trouble at school, and after a meeting with his teacher, Jill believes it's because they're not giving him enough attention, but it's really because Mark is having eye problems and will need glasses. Mark worries he's going to be teased, but Tim and Jill help him get through it, and Randy and Brad agree to stand up for him at school.
79	5	"He Ain't Heavy, He's Just Irresponsible"	Andy Cadiff	Elliot Shoenman & Marley Sims	October 18, 1994	A502	33.2
Tim installs a central vacuum system; Tim's brother Marty visits and tells Tim that he's thinking of leaving his wife Nancy and newborn twin daughters, but Tim's harsh advice turns Marty against him. Meanwhile, Tim makes a big hole in the floor installing the vacuum system, further irritating Jill who is having trouble working on her psychology report because Tim and the boys won't leave her alone.
80	6	"Borland Ambition"	Andy Cadiff	Bob Bendetson & Bruce Ferber	October 25, 1994	A506	37.0
Harry offers to sell Tim 20% of his hardware store. Jill doesn't let Tim buy it, so Al decides to purchase it. When Al becomes obsessed with the store, this drives everyone crazy, including Ilene when he skips a date with her, and Tim decides to confront him about it. Brad and Randy try to beat Mark (dressed as Al) in a Halloween costume contest.
81	7	"Let's Go to the Videotape"	Andy Cadiff	Howard J. Morris	November 8, 1994	A507	29.6
After videotaping an important speech Jill gives, Tim accidentally records himself making fun of her in front of the guys at Harry's Hardware Store. After Jill sees the video, Tim reads some of her psychology books and tapes a fake conversation with his buddies, complimenting Jill.
82	8	"Quibbling Siblings"	Andy Cadiff	Paul Wolff	November 15, 1994	A508	31.2
Al's favorite Bingo caller dies, so Tim has to replace Al on the show for a day with somebody else. Brad volunteers for the position, and Tim allows him to do it. Randy shows signs of jealousy after Brad keeps bragging about it and is convinced Tim favors Brad over him.
83	9	"My Dinner with Wilson"	Andy Cadiff	Elliot Shoenman & Marley Sims	November 22, 1994	A510	31.1
At Thanksgiving dinner with the Taylor's, Wilson announces he is moving to Ecuador, but Tim gives him advice in the hopes Wilson will decide to stay. The reason Wilson wants to leave ends up being much more meaningful and personal than Tim anticipates. Tim is able to help Wilson using words from Mario Andretti. Meanwhile, there is a dead rat in the Taylors' wall.
84	10	"Ye Olde Shoppe Teacher"	Andy Cadiff	Howard J. Morris	November 29, 1994	A509	32.0
Mr. Leonard, Tim's high school shop teacher, comes to visit, but after a disastrous guest appearance on Tool Time Mr. Leonard angrily storms off. Tim has to try and mend things with Mr. Leonard and get to the bottom of what set him off.
85	11	"Some Like It Hot Rod"	Andy Cadiff	Neil Kramer & Ned Teitelbaum	December 6, 1994	A511	36.4
Tim finds out he can get his hot rod into a major car magazine, but Jill's preoccupation with Mark's Christmas pageant leads her to accidentally leave Tim's hot rod outside during a major snowstorm. Tim has less than a day to dry his car before the photo shoot.
86	12	"'Twas the Night Before Chaos"	Andy Cadiff	Rosalind Moore	December 13, 1994	A513	35.6
Marty and his wife and kids, along with Jill's parents come to visit for Christmas. Jill learns her parents are having marital problems related to her dad's retirement and tries to fix things, only making them worse. Wilson suggests that Tim talks with Jill's father as a third party, to patch things up.
87	13	"The Route of All Evil"	Andy Cadiff	Lloyd Garver	January 3, 1995	A512	33.7
Brad takes on the responsibility of a paper route and ends up not having enough time in his day for both the route, his schoolwork and other activities, but he doesn't want to quit because he would upset his dad. Brad pays Mark and Randy to do his extra chores, until Tim and Jill find out. Marie helps Jill make dinner while Jill has exams, which the rest of the family enjoys.
88	14	"Brother, Can You Spare a Hot Rod?"	Andy Cadiff	Jon Vandergriff	January 10, 1995	A514	34.6
Tim impulsively sells his finished hot rod to Doug O'Brien (Bruce McGill), a pizza entrepreneur and car collector. This upsets the family, especially Brad because of how much time he and Tim had worked on it. Randy resists going clothes shopping with Jill because he's afraid Jill will embarrass him in front of Beth, his crush.
89	15	"Super Bowl Fever"	Andy Cadiff	Rosalind Moore & Howard J. Morris	January 31, 1995	A517	32.7
Despite Jill asking him not to, Tim throws a Super Bowl party for his loud friends while she is sick with the flu.
90	16	"Bachelor of the Year"	Peter Filsinger	Rosalind Moore	February 7, 1995	A515	32.9
When Al is published as one of Detroit's "Most Eligible Bachelors" in a magazine, women begin flocking all over him and he starts to ignore Ilene. Mark has to write a report on the most interesting person he knows, and he hurts Tim's feelings when he decides to write it on Wilson instead of himself.
91	17	"It's My Party"	Andy Cadiff	Thad Mumford	February 14, 1995	A516	30.9
At Randy's first boy/girl party, Tim puts too many coats of polish on the dance floor which causes Michelle (Kimberly Cullum), the girl Randy likes, to fall and sprain her ankle. Tim bonds with Michelle's overprotective dad over their shared love of classic cars.
92	18	"A House Divided"	Andy Cadiff	Bruce Ferber & Lloyd Garver	February 21, 1995	A518	31.4
Benny, Tim's friend, moves into his aunt's house while she's away. While fixing a gas leak at the house for a Tool Time remote show, Benny fails to mention there's a second gas leak, causing the house to blow up. Benny stays with the Taylor's, much to Jill's annoyance. Everyone, including Wilson and the guys from the hardware store band together to quickly rebuild the house to get Benny out of the Taylor house.
93	19	"The Naked Truth"	Andy Cadiff	Elliot Shoenman & Marley Sims	February 28, 1995	A520	33.9
When Marty and Nancy (Jensen Daggett) are staying with the Taylor's, Tim accidentally walks in on Nancy in the shower, thinking she is Jill. Randy goes to a Bar Mitzvah and must come home after he splits his pants.
94	20	"Talk to Me"	Andy Cadiff	Carmen Finestra & David McFadzean & Matt Williams	March 14, 1995	A519	32.9
Tim drops Jill's wedding ring down a heating vent right after he'd chastised her for being careless with it. When Jill calls Tim out on his recent absentmindedness, he admits he feels underappreciated with all the extra work he's been doing around the house while she's occupied with school. This upsets her, since she's been doing the same things for 15 years without complaint or thanks, sparking a debate on Tool Time.
95	21	"No, No, Godot"	Andy Cadiff	Bob Bendetson	March 21, 1995	A521	31.7
Tim and Al try to scalp tickets to a Red Wings game before heading to the theater with Jill and Ilene, but they're caught by an undercover cop and arrested, and Jill and Ilene have to bail them out. Meanwhile, Mark papier-mâché's Wilson's face for a school project when Wilson watches the kids while Tim and Jill are gone. Brad and Randy try to sneak out for a party.
96	22	"Tool Time After Dark: Parts 1 & 2"	Andy Cadiff	Elliot Shoenman & Marley Sims	April 11, 1995	A525	33.6
97	23	"Tool Time After Dark: Parts 1 & 2"	Andy Cadiff	Elliot Shoenman & Marley Sims	April 11, 1995	A526	33.6
Despite Jill's advice, Tim eats too much Polish food, upsets his stomach and ends up staying up all night watching old Tool Time tapes.
98	24	"Sisters and Brothers"	Andy Cadiff	Rosalind Moore	May 2, 1995	A524	29.0
Jill's visiting sister Carrie (Tudi Roche), a world-traveling photographer, annoys Jill when she constantly makes condescending comments about Jill's "simple" suburban life. Tim's brother Marty's moving plans are halted by an unfinished floor (thanks to Tim). Cal, Al's brother, reveals a childhood secret.
99	25	"A Marked Man"	Peter Filsinger	Jon Vandergriff	May 9, 1995	A523	27.8
Al tells Tim and Jill that one of their boys may have stolen a pocket knife from the hardware store. They don't believe their boys would steal, but soon discover the knife hidden in Mark's pocket in the laundry.
100	26	"Wilson's Girlfriend"	Andy Cadiff	Howard J. Morris	May 23, 1995	A522	31.4
Jill sets Wilson up on his first date in 20 years with her psychology professor, Judith. Tim gives him advice when Judith expresses some doubt about Wilson. Brad gets a horrendous pimple, which, with Jill's help, he covers up with makeup.

=== Season 5 (1995–96) ===
No. overall	No. in season	Title	Directed by	Written by	Original release date	Prod. code	US viewers (millions)
101	1	"A Taylor Runs Through It"	Andy Cadiff	Bruce Ferber & Lloyd Garver	September 19, 1995	A528	32.1
The family travels to Traverse City, Michigan, for Jill's cousin's wedding. While Jill tries to write a poem for the wedding ceremony, Tim tries to squeeze in fun activities for him and the boys. Jill, seeing all the fun they're having, decides to take a break from writing to go water skiing with the boys and gets injured when Tim accidentally launches her off a jumping ramp.
102	2	"The First Temptation of Tim"	Andy Cadiff	Howard J. Morris	September 26, 1995	A527	31.0
After Bud Harper, the new owner of Binford, fires Wes, Tim fears Tool Time is in jeopardy, but Bud wants to only fire Al to improve the show's ratings. Tim must decide if his loyalty is to Bud/Binford or Al. Brad keeps getting detention.
103	3	"Her Cheatin' Mind"	Andy Cadiff	Ruth Bennett	October 3, 1995	A531	25.1
After Tim feels threatened by one of Jill's classmates, Chris, he joins her book club who is reading Madame Bovary. After Jill reveals she and Chris have had deep conversations, Tim thinks that Chris is Jill's soul mate. Jill must assure Tim she and Chris are just friends.
104	4	"Jill's Surprise Party"	Andy Cadiff	Elliot Shoenman & Marley Sims	October 17, 1995	A529	28.0
While Tim has everyone at the house for Jill's surprise 40th birthday party (which is actually her 39th), she is off looking for her childhood piano which her cousin has. Bud makes Al try a makeover, which causes him to experience "flannel withdrawal."
105	5	"Advise and Repent"	Andy Cadiff	Rosalind Moore	October 24, 1995	A532	26.4
When Jill gets an A on her psychology paper, she starts giving psychological advice, which causes Randy's girlfriend Michelle's parents to have marital problems. Tim accidentally drops Al's pet turtle Scooter in concrete.
106	6	"Let Them Eat Cake"	Andy Cadiff	Jon Vandergriff	October 31, 1995	A530	24.9
Brad throws a Halloween party for his new friends at school while Mark is sick. Meanwhile, Tim, Jill, Al, Heidi, and Ilene go to an awards show, hoping to win one for Tool Time, but it seems that the only winner will be Cooking with Irma, which has won every other award.
107	7	"The Look"	Andy Cadiff	Elliot Shoenman & Marley Sims	November 7, 1995	A533	26.0
Tim gets "the look" from Jill, after spending $4,000 on Pistons season tickets from Bud. Tim admits to Wilson he was intimidated by "the look", and after getting advice, comes up with a compromise so both he and Jill will be happy.
108	8	"Room Without a View"	Andy Cadiff	Jon Vandergriff	November 14, 1995	A534	26.6
Tim turns the basement into Randy's new room so that Randy doesn't have to share a room with Mark. Yet Randy, who isn't used to all the new sounds of the basement, won't admit he's afraid.
109	9	"Chicago Hope"	Andy Cadiff	Teresa O'Neill	November 21, 1995	A536	25.4
Jill plans on having a romantic weekend at an authentic Japanese hotel with Tim, but Tim fails to mention he's also there for a business meeting with Bud and a Chicago-based sponsor for Tool Time. The meeting takes all day, leaving Jill mostly alone.
110	10	"Doctor in the House"	Andy Cadiff	Bruce Ferber & Lloyd Garver	November 28, 1995	A535	27.3
Jill, Wilson, and Al are jealous when Tim gets an honorary Ph.D.from his college alma mater, but Tim later finds out the school gave him the Ph.D. in the hopes of receiving additional funding from donors because he's a local celebrity.
111	11	"That's My Momma"	Andy Cadiff	Rosalind Moore & Howard J. Morris	December 5, 1995	A537	24.8
Tim's mother comes to town and Tim feels slighted when she'd prefer to have a night out with Mr. Leonard (Tim's old shop teacher) instead of him. When Tim confronts his mom, she tells him Mr. Leonard is someone she can talk to, unlike Tim who never listens to her and doesn't take what she says seriously.
112	12	"'Twas the Flight Before Christmas"	Andy Cadiff	Jon Vandergriff	December 12, 1995	A538	24.5
On Christmas Eve, Tim and Al get stuck at the tiny Alpena, MI airport on the way to Binford's winter festival. Ilene makes Al choose between her and his mother. The boys take on Doc Johnson in the Christmas Lighting Contest in Tim's absence.
113	13	"Oh, Brother"	Andy Cadiff	Ruth Bennett	January 9, 1996	A539	28.0
When Tim hires Marty (who lost his job) to help rebuild the Tool Time set, it puts their relationship on the line when Tim complains about Marty's work performance. Meanwhile, Brad gets a new girlfriend: a girl new to Detroit, who is also a motor-mouth.
114	14	"High School Confidential"	Andy Cadiff	Bruce Ferber & Lloyd Garver	January 16, 1996	A540	24.6
When Tim and Jill find out Randy is getting detention because of his inattentiveness in class, they find out from his teacher he's far ahead of the other students and they all agree to put him in high school level science and math classes. This makes Brad, who has just started getting better grades, jealous. Tim designs the man's bedroom.
115	15	"Tanks for the Memories"	Andy Cadiff	Bruce Ferber & Lloyd Garver	January 30, 1996	A392	23.8
Tim is invited by an old school friend to drive a tank at a military base and reluctantly lets Jill come along, but when Jill outshines him in both tank knowledge and driving ability during a competition, Tim turns into a sore loser because he thinks she humiliated him. The boys are stuck at Al's for a weekend, but perk up when they see the Tool Time game he invented.
116	16	"The Vasectomy One"	Andy Cadiff	Rosalind Moore & Howard J. Morris	February 6, 1996	A541	25.7
Jill wants Tim to get a vasectomy when they agree their family is complete. Tim gets mocked by the guys at the hardware store, which makes him more reluctant to go ahead with the procedure, until Harry secretly tells Tim he had one himself, which rebuilds Tim's confidence. Meanwhile, Randy is voted "best butt" by the girls at school, but learns it was just a prank, while Brad is shocked to learn he lost "best eyebrows" to a kid with a unibrow.
117	17	"Fear of Flying"	Andy Cadiff	Max Eisenberg	February 13, 1996	A542	22.3
Mark wants to take flying lessons, but Jill is reluctant to let him until she has a conversation with Wilson. Jill takes piano lessons, but frustrates her teacher when she shows no improvement, prompting the boys to reveal she hasn't been practicing as much as the teacher told her to. Tim and Al accidentally ruin Bud's car while on a Tool Time location shoot.
118	18	"When Harry Kept Delores"	Andy Cadiff	Jon Vandergriff	February 20, 1996	A543	25.8
Delores, Harry's wife, is demoted at her job at the diner because of her attitude, so she starts picking up shifts at the hardware store, upsetting the casual dynamic the guys enjoy. Tim's advice to Harry about standing up to Delores backfires, putting Harry and Delores' marriage in jeopardy. Country music singer Alan Jackson makes a guest appearance on Tool Time.
119	19	"Eye on Tim"	Peter Bonerz	Bruce Ferber & Lloyd Garver	February 27, 1996	A545	25.1
When a TV report is done on Tool Time, Jill gets angry when the attractive reporter makes blatant advances on Tim, something he seems completely oblivious to until lines are crossed. Jill comes down with a fever, and gets tipsy after drinking Wilson's hot toddy remedy.
120	20	"The Bud Bowl"	Andy Cadiff	Ruth Bennett	March 5, 1996	A544	25.1
Tim and Jill are invited to go bowling with Bud and his wife. Tim tells Jill, who is bowling a great game, to purposely lose after Bud's wife informs Tim the last person who beat Bud at bowling was transferred to Pakistan. Angela, Brad's girlfriend, sets her sister up with Randy, however Randy has trouble having a conversation with her because of Angela's constant interruptions.
121	21	"Engine and a Haircut, Two Fights"	Andrew Tsao	Jon Vandergriff	March 12, 1996	A546	27.0
Tim and Brad get into a fight over Brad's new haircut and the hot rod engine. Meanwhile, Randy doesn't want Jill to help him rehearse for an audition to play Romeo in a school play of Romeo & Juliet.
122	22	"The Longest Day"	Andy Cadiff	Elliot Shoenman & Marley Sims	April 2, 1996	A547	38.0
It's a tense 24 hours in the Taylor household while they await medical test results for Randy. After finding swelling around his neck, his doctor warns Tim and Jill Randy could have problems with his thyroid, with thyroid cancer being a possibility.
123	23	"Mr. Wilson's Opus"	Richard Compton	Bruce Ferber	April 30, 1996	A549	19.8
Wilson becomes the director of Randy's school play when his drama teacher goes into labor, but takes the fun out of it for everyone with his micromanaging and eccentric direction. When Tim later shows him the aluminum set he built, Wilson doesn't like it and orders him to rebuild a new one, and Tim soon quits. Jill's parenting advice turns against her.
124	24	"Shopping Around"	Andy Cadiff	Rosalind Moore & Howard J. Morris	May 7, 1996	A548	21.0
Tim accidentally shoots Art Leonard, his old shop teacher, with a nail gun on Tool Time. Later, Tim and Jill see Art, who is dating Tim's mother, at a restaurant with another woman.
125	25	"Alarmed by Burglars"	Geoffrey Nelson	Charlie Hauck	May 14, 1996	A550	22.9
When Wilson's house is burglarized and ransacked, Tim decides to get a surprisingly simple security system, thinking of Jill's reaction. However Jill, paranoid over what happened to Wilson, urges Tim to get the biggest security system he can find, but the overly-complicated system causes chaos in the house and the neighborhood. Brad gets the opportunity to cheat on an important exam, but trips the sensitive alarm sneaking downstairs to retrieve the test answers slipped under the front door by his friend Jason.
126	26	"Games, Flames and Automobiles"	Peter Filsinger	Jennifer Celotta	May 21, 1996	A551	22.7
While Tool Time is on vacation, Al plans to market his Tool Time board game, puts his life savings on the line, and plans to propose to Ilene on the upcoming Saturday. But, Tim, Jill, and Mark discover a malfunction that causes a fire due to a wiring defect, which Al didn't know about. When it turns out the person that built the games is in jail, Tim, Jill, Cal, Wilson, Heidi, and Ilene have to repair all the games before they have to be shipped to customers. Al proposes to Ilene.

=== Season 6 (1996–97) ===
No. overall	No. in season	Title	Directed by	Written by	Original release date	Prod. code	US viewers (millions)
127	1	"At Sea"	Andrew Tsao	Bruce Ferber & Lloyd Garver	September 17, 1996	A553	28.38
Jill catches Brad and Angela having a heavy make-out session behind his closed bedroom door. When Jill asks Tim to have the safe sex talk with Brad, Tim is reluctant to do it because it's something he's never done before with a kid and feels out of his element. Tool Time goes to sea in another on-location shoot, with Tim, Al and Heidi boarding the USS Constellation aircraft carrier as part of their salute to engines.
128	2	"Future Shock"	Peter Bonerz	Elliot Shoenman & Marley Sims	September 24, 1996	A554	24.82
After getting into an argument about Tim's strict morning routine, Tim and Jill have dreams about their future lives. In Jill's dream, Tim and his routine prevent her from ever finishing school, which makes her even more upset at him. In Tim's dream, he realizes his strict and obsessive routine leads to some horrible consequences: Al and Heidi quit Tool Time, Wilson runs out of advice to give, and Jill dies under a coffee table.
129	3	"Workshop 'Til You Drop"	Andrew Tsao	Charlie Hauck	October 1, 1996	A552	26.73
When Bud suddenly gets divorced, Tim and Jill decide to go to a couple's therapy workshop to prevent Bud's fate from coming to them. However, Jill finds herself on the defense when the rest of the group, including the other women, agree with Tim that she is too critical and too demanding of him.
130	4	"Burnin' Love"	Geoffrey Nelson	Jon Vandergriff	October 8, 1996	A555	28.26
Tim tells Randy to go after Lauren, Randy's new friend who likes cars, but he finds out she is hanging out with Jason, Brad's friend. After being specifically told not to cook anything, Jill attempts to prove to her psychology colleagues she knows how to cook for a potluck dinner.
131	5	"Al's Video"	Andrew Tsao	Ruth Bennett	October 15, 1996	A557	23.86
Al gets to make a how-to video and asks Tim to direct, but fires him when Tim gets too controlling. Jill gets a new laptop computer and needs the boys help in setting it up, while forbidding Tim to use it.
132	6	"Whose Car is It Anyway?"	Andrew Tsao	Adam England	October 22, 1996	A558	22.02
Jill receives money from an inheritance and buys an Austin-Healey, something she's always wanted. After Tim tries to take over her car purchase decision making, she forbids him from driving her new car. He goes against her wishes, thinking she won't find out, but is caught when a photo of him driving Jill's car is printed in the newspaper.
133	7	"I Was a Teenage Taylor"	Geoffrey Nelson	Eric Horsted	October 29, 1996	A556	29.53
It's a battle of Halloween pranks. First, Tim scares Al, then Brad and Randy scare Jill, then a strange man shows up at the door asking to see the basement. Jill, Tim and Wilson tell Brad and Randy that years ago a man named Clifford Warren was accused of killing his brother, but because of his mental problems he was put in an insane hospital. Little do the boys know that it's a Halloween prank. Unfortunately, Al blows the secret and they invite him to help them pull a prank of their own, but Al blows that one too. Tim, Jill and Mark end up scaring Brad and Randy in the attic, and Al and Wilson pull a prank of their own on the Taylor's.
134	8	"Jill and Her Sisters"	Andrew Tsao	Laurie Gelman	November 12, 1996	A559	23.42
Jill's sisters Linda, Carrie, and Tracie visit to plan their parents' 50th anniversary party, but they start arguing the minute they arrive, and Jill quickly grows tired of being the mediator. Meanwhile, with three guests in the house, Tim and the boys camp out in the backyard for a few nights, however the boys can't get any sleep because of Tim's constant snoring.
135	9	"The Tool Man Delivers"	Peter Bonerz	Charlie Hauck	November 19, 1996	A561	23.47
Heidi goes into labor while on the way to the Classic Car Man of the Year awards with Tim and Jill and they have to stop at a gas station. Tim and Jill help deliver the baby there while receiving instructions from Wilson on the phone, who is at the awards with Al.
136	10	"The Wood, the Bad and the Hungry"	Geoffrey Nelson	Adam England	November 26, 1996	A560	25.34
Benny isn't allowed on the guest list for the Thanksgiving dinner party at the Taylor house because of his terrible behavior the year before, but Tim and Randy spot him at a food shelter, thinking he is having money problems, and invite him as a guest of honor. As it turns out, Benny only eats there because of the free meals.
137	11	"Workin' Man Blues"	Peter Bonerz	Bruce Ferber & Lloyd Garver	December 10, 1996	A562	19.50
Brad gets a part-time job at a sporting goods store and work soon becomes his top priority, and skips his PSATs.
138	12	"No Place Like Home"	Peter Filsinger	Elliot Shoenman & Marley Sims	December 17, 1996	A563	21.11
Tim, Jill and the boys, along with Tim's brothers Jeff and Marty help move their mother out of the family home, but Tim takes an immediate dislike to the new owners and their plans for the place when he finds out they're going to completely gut and re-do the house, essentially erasing his dad's legacy.
139	13	"The Flirting Game"	Peter Filsinger	Laurie Gelman	January 7, 1997	A564	23.68
After teasing Tim for falling victim to a flirtatious door-to-door saleswoman, Jill inadvertently flirts with a policeman to get herself out of a ticket. This makes her hyper aware of her demeanor during an important interview for an internship.
140	14	"The Karate Kid Returns"	Geoffrey Nelson	Jon Vandergriff	January 14, 1997	A565	23.22
Karate-student Mark successfully intervenes when a classmate of Randy's attacks him at the mall after Randy accidentally steps on his shoes. The next day, the incident is written about in the school paper causing the students to make fun of Randy, which leads to some dispute between Tim and Jill & Randy and Lauren. Wilson's cousins The Beach Boys visit, only to reveal resentment between them and Wilson because the group never used any of Wilson's song ideas.
141	15	"Totally Tool Time"	Peter Bonerz	Jon Vandergriff	January 28, 1997	A567	24.64
A high-strung Tim stresses the Tool Time team when the audience includes two Swedish buyers who are considering the show for the European market. Will Tool Time's "Salute to Men" have the desired result? Tim also builds the Man's Gym.
142	16	"A Funny Valentine"	Peter Bonerz	Charlie Hauck	February 11, 1997	A566	19.31
A singer reaches out to Tim and hints that her past relationship with Tim's father was more than friendly. Tim can't remember where he hid Jill's Valentine's Day gift. Brad and Randy struggle to find gifts for their girlfriends.
143	17	"Wilson's World"	Andrew Tsao	Jennifer Celotta	February 18, 1997	A568	20.30
After a critic declares performance artist Wilson is out of touch with reality, the Taylors' neighbor tries to become "one of the guys". Tim and Al compete in a cooking contest with unusual food ingredients.
144	18	"Something Old, Someone Blue"	John Pasquin	Elliot Shoenman & Marley Sims	February 25, 1997	A569	23.35
Al reveals a secret to Tim and the guys before his wedding to Ilene, that he is not sure if marrying her is right. Jill tries to reassure him by talking about how she had to be dragged to her wedding, which offends Tim. Ilene soon reveals she has the same feelings as Al, putting the wedding in jeopardy.
145	19	"Communication Breakdown"	Geoffrey Nelson	Eric Horsted	March 11, 1997	A570	19.47
The kids are using the phone way too much so Tim convinces Jill to let Harry's son Dennis (David DeLuise) install a second line. When Dennis walks out of the job to respond to another call, Tim takes over with the help of Brad and Randy, damaging not only the house, but also Dennis and Harry's relationship. Their fall out causes Tim and Jill to question their own relationship with their sons.
146	20	"My Son, the Driver"	Andrew Tsao	Laurie Gelman	April 1, 1997	A571	21.66
Jill's instincts are correct when she predicts something bad will happen on Brad's first night out with his driver's license - but it's more serious than Brad initially admits. The Unser family (Al Unser Sr., Al Unser Jr., and Al Unser III) visits Tool Time.
147	21	"Insult to Injury"	Geoffrey Nelson	Eric Horsted	April 15, 1997	A572	18.82
Tim dislocates his shoulder on Tool Time, and leaves the hospital in order to make it to his next Tool Time episode to break Bob Vila's record for most appearances on a tool show, where he's injured again. Because of this, Tim is unable to take Mark to an Air Show, severely disappointing him. Instead, he arranges a special surprise for Mark to make up for missing the show.
148	22	"Family Unties"	Geoffrey Nelson	Ruth Bennett	April 29, 1997	A573	19.41
The Taylor's go to a hardware show in Cleveland, and Jill looks forward to spending quality time exploring the city with the boys. But they don't seem to be interested in spending time with her, and she realizes how fast they're growing up. Meanwhile, Tim causes several accidents at the hardware show during Tool Time remotes.
149	23	"The Feminine Mistake"	Peter Bonerz	Laurie Gelman	May 6, 1997	A574	20.58
Tool Time gets the go-ahead to create a special 3D effects show. When Jill discovers that Brad's girlfriend caters to his every need, she insists that Tim sets an example for the boys by acting more like an equal partner.
150	24	"Taps"	Peter Bonerz	Bruce Ferber & Lloyd Garver	May 13, 1997	A575	21.74
Jill's father suddenly dies and she has to deal with the guilt after she pretended to be sick that weekend so her parents wouldn't come to visit. Tim has to deal with the various ways the boys deal with the loss, namely Randy's tendency to make jokes about it.
151	25	"The Kiss and the Kiss Off"	Peter Bonerz	Jennifer Celotta & Adam England	May 20, 1997	A576	22.46
Lisa (Pamela Anderson Lee), the original Tool Time girl who left the show to become a paramedic, returns for a visit. Tim, excited to see her, invites Lisa to come back anytime she wants without consulting the current Tool Time girl, Heidi. As a result, Heidi quits. Tim has to convince her they want her to stay. Randy finally gets up the nerve to ask Lauren out on their first official date, and after some initial hiccups and awkwardness Randy is able to salvage the date with some helpful advice from Wilson.

=== Season 7 (1997–98) ===
No. overall	No. in season	Title	Directed by	Written by	Original release date	Prod. code	US viewers (millions)
152	1	"Quest for Fire"	Andrew Tsao	Bruce Ferber & Lloyd Garver	September 23, 1997	A602	26.06
The family goes on vacation to a Lake Michigan resort and they find out Tim is seriously considering quitting Tool Time and moving permanently to this resort, but Jill thinks he's having a mid-life crisis. Randy meets with Lauren at the lake but they struggle finding some alone time. Brad is depressed because Angela dumped him for a guy with a cool car. Mark's changing clothing style starts to worry Jill.
153	2	"Clash of the Taylors"	Andrew Tsao	Jennifer Celotta & Adam England	September 30, 1997	A601	21.47
Randy and Tim face off over Binford's environmental policies when Randy writes an article for his school newspaper, and his interview with Bud leads Randy to cause a Tool Time argument. Jill gets an internship counseling families.
154	3	"Room at the Top"	Geoffrey Nelson	Elliot Shoenman & Marley Sims	October 7, 1997	A603	24.21
The family is driving Jill crazy and she is having a hard time getting any of her studies/work done and impulsively decides to let Tim build her a room all of her own... but it's not all smooth sailing as she visits a psychologist as part of her schooling and ends up changing her mind about the room, causing a huge fight between her and Tim.
155	4	"Pump You Up"	Peter Bonerz	Jon Vandergriff	October 14, 1997	A605	24.81
After Brad gets word, he's a candidate for a soccer scholarship, Tim begins to push him to get better, but Brad's growing ego gets him kicked off the school soccer team. Randy and Lauren keep getting cornered by an annoying couple who want to go on a double date; Jill saves the day by "offering" to come along on the date. The K&B Construction guys make an appearance on the show, and Mark furthers his rebellion by wearing dark clothes and painting his nails black.
156	5	"A Night to Dismember"	Geoffrey Nelson	Eric Horsted	October 28, 1997	A606	19.19
It's Halloween at the Taylor house. Worried that Mark will spend the night alone with Ronnie, Jill asks Brad and Randy to take them to a party they're going to, but they refuse. Mark tells his parents that he and Ronnie are in a film class, and that they're going to be making a horror film about an ignored boy who wants to kill his family - but the characters hit a little too close to home for Tim and Jill, leaving them more concerned about Mark's changing behavior than ever before.
157	6	"The Niece"	Peter Bonerz	Charlie Hauck	November 4, 1997	A607	17.43
Wilson's free-spirited niece, Willow, comes to visit for his birthday, and decides to stay for a while, but soon starts to feel smothered when Wilson wants to spend every moment with her. Tim becomes impatient because Wilson no longer has time for him.
158	7	"Jill's Passion"	Peter Bonerz	Elliot Shoenman & Marley Sims	November 11, 1997	A608	27.91
Tim and Al use Wilson's garage to demonstrate how to make room in a garage on Tool Time. Jill is asked out by a man named Ian (Tom Wopat) at the gym who thought Tim and Jill were brother and sister after watching an earlier interaction between them. That night, she dreams about kissing Ian. Feeling guilty, she opens up a conversation with Tim about how she doesn't want their marriage to go stale.
159	8	"Losing My Religion"	Andrew Tsao	Bruce Ferber & Lloyd Garver	November 18, 1997	A609	20.86
Tim manages to break a valuable piece of church equipment during Custom Cabinet week on Tool Time. After volunteering at a hospice, Randy begins to question his religion and is shocked when his patient takes a sudden turn for the worse. Dan Aykroyd makes a guest appearance as Father Mike Weber, Aykroyd's character from the fellow ABC sitcom Soul Man.
160	9	"Thanksgiving"	Peter Bonerz	Eric Horsted	November 25, 1997	A610	18.87
Tim and the family spend Thanksgiving watching the Detroit Lions play a Thanksgiving game from a luxury box. Tim, however, manages to black out the entire Pontiac Silverdome while on a private tour. This leaves Jill and the boys to fend for themselves in the box with an obnoxious Hollywood producer, but their moods lighten when Rodney Dangerfield drops in.
161	10	"The Dating Game"	Geoffrey Nelson	Laurie Gelman	December 9, 1997	A604	19.30
Al finds out his ex-fiance Ilene is engaged and begins hanging around the Taylor house too much. At Jill's insistence, Tim takes Al out to a singles club where they meet women, putting Tim in an uncomfortable and unwanted situation.
162	11	"Bright Christmas"	Peter Bonerz	Jon Vandergriff	December 16, 1997	A613	19.25
New rules for the annual Christmas Lighting Contest make Tim work harder to give his display "more power!". Jill is upset when she finds out her mother is dating so soon after her father's death.
163	12	"The Old College Try"	Albert Alarr	Jennifer Celotta & Adam England	January 6, 1998	A611	18.21
Tim starts to believe that his old friends are boring after he has the opportunity to teach an auto-shop class at a local college, so he starts hanging out with people from the class... people half his age.
164	13	"An Older Woman"	Peter Bonerz	Charlie Hauck	January 20, 1998	A612	22.86
Brad, still depressed about being dumped by Angela, is encouraged by Tim and Jill to go to a party where he meets college junior Samantha Hayes (Maggie Lawson). Already uncomfortable with the age difference, Tim and Jill are further shocked when Brad announces he and Samantha are getting married.
165	14	"Tim 'The Landlord' Taylor"	Peter Filsinger	Eric Horsted	February 3, 1998	A614	18.52
Tim and Jill buy an investment property and Al moves in as the tenant. However, Tim and Al soon starting butting heads when Tim forces Al to sign an 18-page lease with strict rules, of which Al begins to take advantage of. Brad and Randy accidentally buy the same shirt and argue over who gets to wear it.
166	15	"Say Goodnight, Gracie"	Andrew Tsao	Laurie Gelman	February 10, 1998	A615	16.97
Tim decides he wants more children after Marty asks him to babysit one of the twins. After some discussions about his vasectomy with Jill, and some words of wisdom from Wilson, he decides that being able to return the twins after playing with them is the best idea. Mark is still wearing black, but with an added touch (of lipstick) for this episode.
167	16	"What a Drag"	Geoffrey Nelson	Elliot Shoenman & Marley Sims	February 24, 1998	A616	23.64
Tool Time is on location at the Taylor house as Tim and Al show viewers how to prepare for a severe winter storm. When Tim falls through the gazebo he discovers a small bag of marijuana taped to the underside of the swing. Jill and Tim stake out their backyard from Wilson's where they catch the culprit red-handed. This leads Jill to admit to a scary drug experience she had while high at a Led Zeppelin concert.
168	17	"Taking Jill for Granite"	Peter Bonerz	Laurie Gelman	March 3, 1998	A617	17.55
The Taylor's do a kitchen remodel, but a surprise is in store when Tim and Jill find out who the counter installer is: Ian, the man Jill met at the gym and had an attraction to in an earlier season seven episode.
169	18	"Futile Attraction"	Peter Bonerz	David Maples	March 10, 1998	A618	19.01
Tim becomes suspicious that Heidi and Al are having an affair when he finds out she has separated from her husband and begins spending a lot of time with Al; he sets out to find out exactly how much of an affair they are having. On Tool Time, golf-pro Payne Stewart stops by to help demonstrate a golfing simulator. Jill catches a cold.
170	19	"Desperately Seeking Willow"	Peter Bonerz	Jennifer Fisher	March 17, 1998	A619	18.18
When Wilson is out of town and his house is being fumigated, Willow stays over at the Taylor's, and Willow doesn't return home from a club one night. Jill fears the worst and sends the whole family out searching for her. It's Saint Patrick's Day on Tool Time, and the boys from K&B Construction drop by for a visit.
171	20	"The Write Stuff"	Peter Bonerz	Jennifer Celotta & Adam England	March 31, 1998	A620	17.67
On Tool Time, Tim manages to throw himself out a window while doing renovation work. Jill tries to get Tim to help prepare for a tax audit. Brad and Randy become rivals when Brad's tabloid article "Hey Yo!" takes the spotlight away from Randy's "Genetic Mutations in the Second Half of the 20th Century".
172	21	"The Son Also Mooches"	Peter Filsinger	Eric Horsted	April 21, 1998	A622	15.29
It's Jill's turn to worry about needing glasses as she struggles to read her textbooks. Tim worries that his mother is going to lose money on another of his brother Jeff's business schemes: a 'UPS Store' like operation.
173	22	"Believe It or Not"	Geoffrey Nelson	Jon Vandergriff	April 28, 1998	A621	13.39
On Tool Time, "Men's Convenience Week" features a visit by Grant Hill of the Detroit Pistons. Wilson becomes upset with Tim after he tells everyone about Wilson's encounter with an alien, something Wilson would rather Tim had kept to himself.
174	23	"Rebel Without Night Driving Privileges"	Andrew Tsao	Jennifer Fisher	May 5, 1998	A623	13.71
Randy feels slighted when his driving privileges differ from those Brad had when he first got his license. On Tool Time, "Judy's Rat" pulls cable through hard to reach spaces, and bites Tim's nose. Afterward "Judy" confesses that she's the real Judy's sister Trudy, and is impersonating her sister in order to meet Al.
175	24	"Tool-Thousand-One: A Space Odyssey"	Peter Bonerz	Bruce Ferber & Lloyd Garver	May 12, 1998	A624	12.61
Tool Time is revisited by NASA astronauts Ken Bowersox and Steve Hawley, who announce that a Binford tool will be used on their next shuttle mission. Tim and Al go to Houston to try and win a spot on the mission to be the one to use the tool in space. Mark tries to impress a girl by making a dramatic change to his appearance.
176	25	"From Top to Bottom"	Peter Filsinger	Charlie Hauck	May 19, 1998	A625	17.45
On Tool Time, Tim is getting ready to pick the final colors for the hot rod, but this soon leads to a delay in finishing it. When Jill is asked to appear on a talk show, "Women on Top", she makes some comments that make Tim look bad.

=== Season 8 (1998–99) ===
No. overall	No. in season	Title	Directed by	Written by	Original release date	Prod. code	US viewers (millions)
177	1	"Whitewater"	Geoffrey Nelson	Bruce Ferber & Lloyd Garver	September 22, 1998	A628	15.93
Jill's surprise birthday gift of a river-rafting adventure trip with Heidi, Al, and Wilson to Kernville, California goes against Tim's plans of VIP tickets to a NASCAR race. Tim annoys everyone with his ungrateful behavior. Mark and Brad create a big soda stain on the couch after arguing who gets to use Tim's new massage chair.
178	2	"Adios"	Geoffrey Nelson	Jon Vandergriff	September 29, 1998	A627	16.99
The Taylor family has to say some tough goodbyes to Randy after he is unexpectedly accepted into a yearlong environmental-study program in Costa Rica. Meanwhile, Tool Time holds auditions for a group to write lyrics to the Tool Time theme music.: This is the last episode Jonathan Taylor Thomas appears as a regular cast member.
179	3	"All in the Family"	Geoffrey Nelson	Elliot Shoenman & Marley Sims	October 6, 1998	A626	16.45
Jill's sister Carrie unexpectedly visits, and she and Tim's brother Jeff get a little too friendly with each other, which interrupts Tim and Jill's plans to spend some intimate time together.
180	4	"Taylor Got Game"	Geoffrey Nelson	Jonathan Pollack	October 13, 1998	A630	14.99
While Brad struggles with his SAT practice tests, Wilson's visiting friend, an English soccer-team owner, tells Tim that Brad is good enough to play professionally; Brad seriously considers it.
181	5	"Al's Fair Lady"	Geoffrey Nelson	Tracy Gamble	October 20, 1998	A629	14.52
The Tool Time gang take their show on the road in Tim's new community fix-up van. Tim and Jill are introduced to Al's new, very wealthy girlfriend, who gifts Al a rare and expensive classic car. Al, uncomfortable with the extravagant gift, goes to Tim for advice, but Tim, who is enjoying being able to use the car, tells Al to accept it. This leads Jill to question Tim on what he values more: Al or the car.
182	6	"Bewitched"	Geoffrey Nelson	Jennifer Celotta & Adam England	October 27, 1998	A631	15.29
The Taylors' Halloween-prank tradition continues when Jill springs the ultimate on Tim, feigning the disappearance and death of Wilson.
183	7	"Not-So-Great Scott"	Peter Bonerz	Laurie Gelman	November 3, 1998	A632	14.11
Jill, violating doctor/patient confidentiality, reveals to Tim that she thinks one of her patients is seeing Heidi's husband Scott (Mark Dobies); Tim can't keep the secret and reveals the affair to Heidi.
184	8	"Tim's First Car"	Peter Bonerz	Kim Flagg & David Maples	November 10, 1998	A633	15.63
Tim finds his first car at a junkyard and pleads with Jill to let him buy it. She initially says no, but after speaking with Wilson and understanding the importance of it to Tim, she changes her mind, however it's too late for the car. Jill instead decides to find Tim an exact replica of the car. Mark helps Brad apply to colleges by making a video for him to send out to prospective schools.
185	9	"Mr. Likeable"	Peter Bonerz	Adam England	November 17, 1998	A634	13.53
Tim has trouble convincing everyone he's happy for Al, who beat Tim in the TV popularity ratings for the area. This leads to Al hiring a manager and getting a role in a TV movie with Morgan Fairchild. Mark thinks being a girl's shoulder to cry on makes her like him because of Brad's advice.
186	10	"Thanks, but No Thanks"	Peter Bonerz	Jonathan Pollack	November 24, 1998	A635	15.21
Without consulting the rest of the family, Tim invites his brother Marty and 6-year-old twin nieces to live at the house when he discovers Marty is sleeping at the hardware store after separating from his wife.
187	11	"Home for the Holidays"	Peter Bonerz	Jonathan Pollack	December 8, 1998	A636	16.13
Randy returns home unexpectedly for Christmas and admits to Wilson he feels like a guest in his own house because of all the changes that have occurred. Tim discovers that his biggest rival in the annual neighborhood-lighting contest is Al whose wealthy girlfriend helps with decorating.: This is the last episode Jonathan Taylor Thomas appears as Randy Taylor outside of flashbacks.
188	12	"Ploys for Tots"	Peter Bonerz	Laurie Gelman	December 15, 1998	A637	13.30
Tim and Jill try to give Marty parenting advice (something Marty takes offense to) when Claire, one of the twins, keeps throwing tantrums to get her own way at the expense of her sister Gracie.
189	13	"Chop Shop 'Til You Drop"	Shawn Shea	David Maples	January 5, 1999	A638	18.56
Tim and Jill buy Brad a car, which is done on Tool Time where Al drops boysenberry jelly on the manifold, but when it's stolen and stripped for parts, Tim and Al go undercover to catch the thieves--by finding the berry stain.
190	14	"Home Alone"	Geoffrey Nelson	Jennifer Celotta & Adam England	January 19, 1999	A651	14.27
Spending a weekend alone to write a book for Binford, Tim is distracted by dreams of fame and fortune.
191	15	"Knee Deep"	Peter Filsinger	Jonathan Pollack	February 2, 1999	A641	15.56
Brad blames Tim for possibly ruining his soccer career when he injures his knee after tripping on rolled-up carpet during a Tool Time shoot at the house. Tim wins Car Guy of the Year at a cheese banquet. The magicians Penn & Teller appear on Tool Time.
192	16	"Mark's Big Break"	Geoffrey Nelson	Tracy Gamble	February 9, 1999	A639	14.81
Tim commissions Mark to film a video to celebrate the hot rod's completion. But when Tim is dissatisfied with the results, Mark directs a dance number starring Tim, Jill, Al, Heidi, Wilson, Sparky, and Eddie the body shop guy, set to "Greased Lightning", a musical number from Grease.
193	17	"Young at Heart"	Geoffrey Nelson	Bruce Ferber & Lloyd Garver	February 16, 1999	A640	15.76
Tim and Jill's 19th-anniversary plans go awry when Tim is caught on a traffic camera in a compromising position with his new female mechanic, Alex (Jenny McCarthy).
194	18	"Love's Labor Lost" (Part 1)	Peter Bonerz	Elliot Shoenman & Marley Sims	February 23, 1999	A642	19.18
Ski-trip plans are put on hold when Jill needs an emergency hysterectomy, as for several years she had not managed to fit checkups into her busy schedule. Tim helps her face the situation, but becomes frightened when complications arise during surgery.
195	19	"Love's Labor Lost" (Part 2)	Peter Bonerz	Elliot Shoenman & Marley Sims	March 2, 1999	A643	21.58
Tim waits for news on Jill's surgery. Jill will be fine, but due to unexpected complications ends up having to have her ovaries removed as well. Jill's mother visits to help Tim look after her, but Jill, due to the sudden hormone changes, starts to take her anger out on Tim. Jill's mom offers her valuable advice on how to cope with the changes to her body.
196	20	"Neighbors"	Patricia Richardson	Drew Levin	March 16, 1999	A644	14.37
Tim and Wilson's friendship is tested when Wilson wins $10,000 at a Red Wings game that Tim takes Wilson to for his birthday. Wilson decides to build an elaborate Victorian greenhouse in his backyard--which blocks the Taylors' view. Mark tries to woo a girl.
197	21	"A Hardware Habit to Break"	Peter Bonerz	Jon Vandergriff	March 30, 1999	A645	14.11
When Harry announces he's moving to Arizona with Delores and selling the hardware store, Tim organizes a fundraising party for the store to entice some potential buyers but ends up buying it himself after being pressured by the attendees. After Harry's departure, Tim and Al struggle to keep the store afloat. Brad tries to convince Jill to let him go to Florida for spring break.
198	22	"Loose Lips and Freudian Slips"	Tim Allen	Kim Flagg	May 4, 1999	A646	13.06
Jill's thesis is before the committee. During Mark's student-film viewing, Jill's psychology professor sees her criticize him and she is worried that this will affect the thesis committee's decision.
199	23	"Trouble-a-Bruin"	Andrew Tsao	Tracy Gamble & David Maples	May 11, 1999	A647	13.04
Bud mandates that no non-Binford products are to be used on the show and makes major changes that perturb Tim. Brad must decide whether to play soccer earlier than he is scheduled to when he has an opportunity to play for a UCLA soccer coach/scout. Jill, worried for Brad's safety, goes against it.
200	24	"Dead Weight"	Geoffrey Nelson	Jennifer Celotta	May 18, 1999	A648	14.59
Tool Time continues to be a "jewel" despite the continued excess presence of the Binford name, and new producer Morgan Wandell tries to give Tim a hard time. Things rapidly turn sad when Al decides to take his mother Alma out to dinner to tell her he's marrying Trudy--and upon hearing the news, Alma has a heart attack and dies.
201	25	"The Long and Winding Road" (Part 1)	Andy Cadiff	Laurie Gelman	May 18, 1999	A649	17.18
Tool Time's new producer Morgan stages a Jerry Springer-style fight on the show. When Tim learns Bud left Binford and Morgan refuses to stop degrading the show, Tim quits, followed by Al and Heidi. Jill's psychology professor offers her a prestigious job with a renowned psychologist - but the job is in Indiana.
202	26	"The Long and Winding Road" (Part 2)	Jim Praytor	Carmen Finestra & Billy Riback	May 25, 1999	A652	35.53
During the ride to school, Tim and the boys reminisce about some of the good times they've had, with clips from previous shows.
203	27	"The Long and Winding Road" (Part 3)	John Pasquin	Bruce Ferber & Lloyd Garver & Marley Sims	May 25, 1999	A650	35.53
In the series finale, Tim records his final Tool Time with a host of memorable guests from previous shows, which garners huge ratings. Morgan offers Tim more money and an executive-producer credit to stay with the show, but Tim refuses because of Jill, who is having second thoughts about accepting the Indiana job. As the two host Al and Trudy's wedding in their backyard (even dismantling the fence so they can use Wilson's yard as well), they discuss their respective opportunities and decide whether they want to stay or go. As they’re cleaning up, Tim and Jill reflect on their love for each other and Jill wants to stay in Detroit as she can’t leave their house behind and Tim agrees as he's done so much work on it over the years. Tim then realizes that they can still move and take the entire building with them. The series ends with shots of the house being hauled on a truck and then riding across a river on a boat with Jill wondering how the boat can move so fast with all the weight, to which Tim replies with "because it has more power" followed by his signature grunting.
204	28	"Backstage Pass"	Geoffrey Nelson	Chris Carlisle & Billy Riback	May 25, 1999	A653	35.53
A look back at the past 8 seasons of Home Improvement, with cast interviews, outtakes, scenes for the final taping—and Earl Hindman's entire face.
