= Buddies (TV series) =

- DVD cover
- Genre: Sitcom
- Created by: Carmen Finestra; David McFadzean; Matt Williams
- Directed by: Paul Lazarus; John Pasquin; Andrew Tsao
- Starring: Dave Chappelle; Christopher Gartin; Paula Cale; Tanya Wright; Richard Roundtree; Judith Ivey
- Theme music composer: Derrick Perkins
- Composer: Brian Bennett
- Country of origin: United States
- Original language: English
- No. of seasons: 1
- No. of episodes: 13 (9 unaired)

Production
- Executive producers: Carmen Finestra; David McFadzean; Matt Williams
- Producer: Gayle S. Maffeo
- Production location: Burbank, California
- Camera setup: Multi-camera
- Running time: 30 minutes
- Production companies: Wind Dancer Productions; Touchstone Television

Original release
- Network: ABC
- Release: March 5 – March 27, 1996

Related
- Home Improvement

Buddies is an American television sitcom that aired on ABC from March 5 to March 27, 1996. It was created by Carmen Finestra, David McFadzean, and Matt Williams and starred Dave Chappelle, Christopher Gartin, Tanya Wright, Jeff Rawluk and Richard Roundtree. It is a spin-off to Home Improvement.

== History ==
=== Home Improvement connection ===
Comedians Dave Chappelle and Jim Breuer attracted the attention of TV network executives with their guest appearance on the (4th season) March 14, 1995, episode of ABC's highly rated sitcom Home Improvement. The storyline had Chappelle and Breuer play friends who appear together on Tool Time to ask Tim Taylor advice on their girlfriends. The characters' single outing on the episode proved so popular that ABC decided to give Chappelle and Breuer their own half-hour sitcom.

=== Cast changes ===
After subsequent rehearsals, Breuer was replaced with Christopher Gartin as Chappelle's "buddy". The unique comic timing and chemistry that Chappelle had with Breuer, his real-life friend, was not present with Gartin, and Breuer's abrupt firing exacerbated ill will. This prevented Chappelle and Gartin from developing the rapport and chemistry necessary for the characters' believability and likeability.

=== Broadcast ===
Buddies premiered on Tuesday, March 5, 1996. The show garnered disappointing ratings. Buddies was cancelled on April 3 after airing only four out of the 13 produced episodes. Chappelle himself was not proud of his involvement with Buddies in retrospect:

It was a bad show. It was bad. I mean when we were doing it, I could tell this was not gonna work.

== Cast ==
- Dave Chappelle as Dave Carlisle
- Christopher Gartin as John Bailey
- Paula Cale as Lorraine Bailey
- Tanya Wright as Phyllis Brooks
- Richard Roundtree as Henry Carlisle
- Judith Ivey as Maureen DeMoss

== Episodes ==
All 13 episodes of Buddies, released on DVD, are presented in production order.

No.	Title	Directed by	Written by	Original release date	U.S. viewers (millions)
1	"Pilot"	Andrew Tsao	Carmen Finestra & David McFadzean & Matt Williams	March 5, 1996	17.1
2	"Marry Me...Sort Of"	Paul Lazarus	Daphne Pollon	Unaired	N/A
3	"A Room with a Pyew"	John Pasquin	Trish Baker	March 13, 1996	13.9
4	"Famous Last Words"	John Pasquin	Mark St. Germain	March 27, 1996	11.9
5	"Pet Peeves"	John Pasquin	Robert Zappia	Unaired	N/A
6	"The Content of Their Character"	John Pasquin	Lisa DeBenedictis & Daryl Rowland	Unaired	N/A
7	"There Goes the Groom"	John Pasquin	Richey Jones & Todd Jones	Unaired	N/A
8	"The PSA Story"	John Pasquin	Bob Burris & Michael Ware	Unaired	N/A
9	"John, I've Been Thinking"	John Pasquin	Art Everett	Unaired	N/A
10	"Engagement Hell"	Andrew Tsao	Steve Gabriel	Unaired	N/A
11	"Lights, Camera...Yuck!"	Paul Lazarus	Peter Tolan	Unaired	N/A
12	"Regarding Henry"	Andrew Tsao	Sharon D. Johnson	March 20, 1996	12.2
13	"Whack and Blight"	Andrew Tsao	Peter Tolan	Unaired	N/A

== Home media ==
Best Buy released an exclusive DVD on May 15, 2005, that contained 10 episodes of Buddies, including 8 unaired episodes.
