= Losing My Religion (disambiguation) =

"Losing My Religion" is a song by R.E.M.

Losing My Religion may also refer to:

== Literature ==
- Losing My Religion (novel), a 2014 novel by Vishwas Mudagal
- Losing My Religion: Unbelief in Australia, a 2009 book by Tom Frame
- "Losing My Religion", a 2017 essay by Eric T. Hansen

== Music ==
- Losing My Religion (album), a 2015 album by Kirk Franklin
- "Losing My Religion", a song by Lauren Daigle from Look Up Child

== Television episodes ==
- "Losing My Religion" (Grey's Anatomy)
- "Losing My Religion" (Home Improvement)
- "Losing My Religion" (The Looming Tower)
- "Losing My Religion" (Moving On)
- "Losing My Religion" (Out of Order)
