= Thunder Alley (TV series) =

American television sitcom (1994–1995)

- The Thunder Alley season 2 cast (from left to right), Edward Asner, Kelly Vint, Robin Riker, Haley Joel Osment and Lindsay Felton.
- Genre: Sitcom
- Created by: Carmen Finestra; David McFadzean; Matt Williams
- Starring: Edward Asner; Diane Venora; Robin Riker; Kelly Vint; Lindsay Felton; Haley Joel Osment; Jim Beaver; Andrew Keegan
- Composer: Howard Pearl
- Country of origin: United States
- Original language: English
- No. of seasons: 2
- No. of episodes: 27

Production
- Executive producers: Carmen Finestra; Dan Guntzelman; David McFadzean; Matt Williams
- Producers: Bob Burris; Tim Doyle; Barry Gold; Dan Guntzelman; Gayle S. Maffeo; Michael Ware; Ed Asner
- Running time: 22 minutes
- Production companies: Wind Dancer Productions; Touchstone Television

Original release
- Network: ABC
- Release: March 9, 1994 – July 4, 1995

Thunder Alley is an American sitcom that aired from March 9, 1994, to July 4, 1995, on ABC.

== Premise ==
The show stars Ed Asner as retired race car driver Gil Jones. The unaired original pilot episode featured Felicity Huffman in the role of Bobbi Turner, Gil's daughter. When ABC picked up the series, Huffman was replaced with Diane Venora. The pilot was reshot and Venora played the role for eight episodes before she was replaced by Robin Riker in the second season, who played the role for the remainder of the series.

The story involved Bobbi returning to her old hometown after a divorce to live with her father. In tow were her three children: Claudine (Kelly Vint); Jenny (Lindsay Felton); and Harry (Haley Joel Osment). The new family quintet lived in Gil's home above Thunder Alley, the specialty racing garage Gil operated. Rounding out the cast was Gil's dim-witted mechanic sidekick, Leland DuParte (Jim Beaver). In the show's second season, Andrew Keegan joined the cast as Jack Kelly, a local boy who helped around the garage. The first season was set in Indianapolis, Indiana, followed by Detroit, Michigan in the second season. It also had a crossover with Home Improvement when Zachary Ty Bryan guest starred on the show.

== Production and broadcast history ==
Thunder Alley was created and executive produced by Matt Williams, Carmen Finestra and David McFadzean for Wind Dancer Productions and Touchstone Television. The director of a majority of episodes was Robby Benson.

The show debuted to good ratings, finishing its first season the number 12th program with an average household share of 15.9, helped in part by its being paired with the hit Home Improvement, coming from the same producers. However, it struggled in its second season when it was slotted as the lead-off show on Wednesday nights. It was canceled in the spring of 1995.

== Cast and characters ==
- Edward Asner as Gil Jones
- Diane Venora (season 1) & Robin Riker (season 2) as Bobbi Turner, Gil's daughter
- Kelly Vint as Claudine Turner, Bobbi's eldest daughter
- Lindsay Felton as Jenny Turner, Bobbi's second eldest daughter
- Haley Joel Osment as Harry Turner, Bobbi's youngest son
- Jim Beaver as Leland DuParte
- Andrew Keegan as Jack Kelly (season 2)

== Episodes ==
=== Series overview ===
Season	Episodes	Originally released	
Season	Episodes	First released	Last released
1	8	March 9, 1994	May 4, 1994
2	19	September 14, 1994	July 4, 1995

=== Season 1 (1994) ===
No. overall	No. in season	Title	Directed by	Written by	Original release date	U.S. viewers (millions)
1	1	"The Prototype"	Barnet Kellman	Carmen Finestra & David McFadzean & Matt Williams	March 9, 1994	29.2
2	2	"The Love Triangle"	Robby Benson	Robert Zappia	March 16, 1994	25.2
3	3	"Chore Patrol"	Andy Cadiff	Tim Doyle	March 23, 1994	23.1
4	4	"Girl's Night Out"	Robby Benson	Deborah Pearl	March 30, 1994	27.3
5	5	"Bloodsuckers"	Robby Benson	Tim Doyle & Steve Gabriel	April 6, 1994	23.3
6	6	"Happy Endings"	Robby Benson	Rita Hsiao & Robert Zappia	April 13, 1994	25.1
7	7	"A Fist Full of Phyllis"	John Rago	Joey Murphy & John Pardee	April 20, 1994	20.8
8	8	"As a Manner of Fact"	John Rago	Steve Gabriel	May 4, 1994	20.2

=== Season 2 (1994–95) ===
No. overall	No. in season	Title	Directed by	Written by	Original release date	U.S. viewers (millions)
9	1	"Never Say Die"	Robby Benson	Lissa Levin	September 14, 1994	20.4
10	2	"Speak No Evil"	Robby Benson	Barry Gold	September 21, 1994	13.0
11	3	"Easy Money"	Robby Benson	Jake Weinberger & Mike Weinberger	September 28, 1994	13.8
12	4	"Get a Job"	Robby Benson	Bob Burris & Michael Ware	October 5, 1994	14.4
13	5	"First Date"	Robby Benson	Robert Zappia	October 12, 1994	16.7
14	6	"Give 'Em Hell, Bobbi"	Robby Benson	Steve Gabriel	October 19, 1994	15.1
15	7	"Sex, Lies & Popcorn"	Robby Benson	Bob Burris & Michael Ware	October 26, 1994	15.4
16	8	"The Garage Sale"	Robby Benson	Michael B. Kaplan	November 2, 1994	15.6
17	9	"Accidentally at First Sight"	Robby Benson	Deborah Pearl	March 7, 1995	22.3
18	10	"Are We There Yet?"	Robby Benson	Lissa Levin	March 14, 1995	19.9
19	11	"Breaking Away"	Pat Fischer-Doak	Michael B. Kaplan	March 21, 1995	20.0
20	12	"The Trouble with Harry"	Robby Benson	Robert Zappia	March 28, 1995	20.1
21	13	"Workin' Man's Blues"	Robby Benson	Bill Freiberger	April 4, 1995	19.6
22	14	"A Little Me Time"	Robby Benson	Barry Gold	April 11, 1995	19.1
23	15	"I Am Spartacus"	Robby Benson	Michael B. Kaplan	April 18, 1995	15.3
24	16	"Guess Who's Coming to Dinner"	Pat Fischer-Doak	Jake Weinberger & Mike Weinberger	April 25, 1995	16.8
25	17	"Just a Vacation"	Robby Benson	Paul A. Kaplan	May 2, 1995	20.2
26	18	"Buzz Off, Buzzard Boy"	Robby Benson	Steve Gabriel	May 9, 1995	18.6
27	19	"No Swing Set"	Robby Benson	Carmen Finestra & David McFadzean & Matt Williams	July 4, 1995	8.2

== Awards and nominations ==
Year	Award	Result	Category	Recipient
1995	Young Artist Awards	Nominated	Best Performance: Young Actor in a TV Comedy Series	Andrew Keegan
1995	Young Artist Awards	Nominated	Best Performance by an Actress Under Ten in a TV Series	Lindsay Felton
