= What About Bob? (disambiguation) =

What About Bob? is a 1991 comedy film starring Bill Murray and Richard Dreyfuss. The term may also refer to:

- "What About Bob?" (Dresden), an episode of the television series The Dresden Files
- "What About Bob?" (Entourage), a third-season episode of the television series Entourage
- "What About Bob?" (Eureka), a third-season episode of the television series Eureka
- "What About Bob?" (Home Improvement), a first-season episode of the television series Home Improvement
