= Losing My Religion (novel) =

2014 novel by Vishwas Mudagal

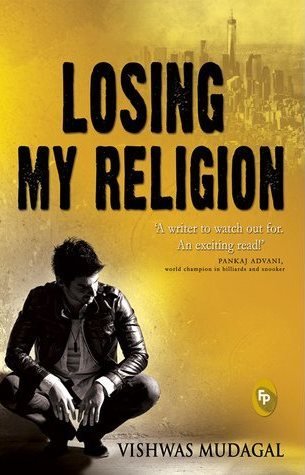
- The first-edition cover as published by Fingerprint Publishing.
- Author: Vishwas Mudagal
- Language: English
- Genre: Fiction
- Publisher: FingerPrint! Publishing
- Publication date: February 2014
- Publication place: India
- Media type: Print (paperback)
- Pages: 350
- ISBN: 9788172344931

Losing My Religion is a fiction novel by Indian author Vishwas Mudagal. This debut novel of Mudagal was published by FingerPrint! Publishing and released on 10 February 2014.

== Plot ==
The story is about a young entrepreneur - Rishi Rai who goes bankrupt and sets off on an unplanned trip across India which soon turns into a journey of self-discovery, love and friendship.

== Characters ==
- Rishi Rai, an Entrepreneur from Bangalore
- Alexander Long, a hippie from San Francisco
- Kyra Blake, a New York girl
- Gerard Wolf, a New York based media mogul
