= The Last Avatar – Age of Kalki =

Book by Vishwas Mudagal

- Author: Vishwas Mudagal
- Language: English
- Genre: Science fiction
- Publisher: HarperCollins India
- Publication date: November 2018
- Publication place: India
- Media type: Print (paperback)
- Pages: 320
- ISBN: 9353024668

The Last Avatar – Age of Kalki is a science-fiction and mythology book by Indian writer Vishwas Mudagal. The first book of the Age of Kalki series, it was published by HarperCollins India and released on 30 November 2018.

== Plot summary ==
In the near future, a devastating war plunges the world into chaos, and the terrorist group known as Invisible Hand seizes the opportunity to launch a lethal strike against the Indian prime minister and the union cabinet, sparking a national emergency and unleashing fear and destruction across the country.

Amid a global erosion of democratic ideals, a singular hero emerges: a mysterious vigilante named Kalki, who is aided by a secretive organization called The Rudras and the superhuman Chinese spy Nushen. Together, they must undertake an impossible mission to save their nation and the fate of the world hangs in the balance.

The Rudras is portrayed as a mysterious prehistoric secret society created to protect the Scripture of Gods, which is a collection of ancient scriptures that hold ‘absolute’ knowledge that is unthinkable for the human race and is written through the ages by Indian sages and gurus.

== Main characters ==
- Kalki, the destroyer
- Arya Sharma, the immortal warrior
- Nushen, a Chinese superhuman spy
- Master Zar, leader of the terrorist group the Invisible Hand
