= Carol & Company =

American comedy anthology television series

- Genre: Comedy anthology
- Developed by: Matt Williams; David McFadzean
- Written by: Marilyn Anderson; Dana Coen
- Directed by: Will Mackenzie; Marian Deaton; Andrew D. Weyman
- Starring: Carol Burnett; Anita Barone; Meagen Fay; Richard Kind; Terry Kiser; Peter Krause; Jeremy Piven
- Theme music composer: Dan Foliart; Howard Pearl
- Country of origin: United States
- Original language: English
- No. of seasons: 2
- No. of episodes: 33

Production
- Running time: 30 minutes
- Production companies: Touchstone Television; Wind Dancer Productions; Kalola Productions

Original release
- Network: NBC
- Release: March 31, 1990 – May 4, 1991

Carol & Company is an American comedy anthology television series starring Carol Burnett, Jeremy Piven, Meagen Fay, Terry Kiser, Anita Barone, Richard Kind and Peter Krause that aired for two seasons on NBC from March 31, 1990, to July 20, 1991.

== Overview ==
Carol & Company began as a mid-season replacement from March 31 to June 2, 1990, and was subsequently picked up for a full season that ran from September 22, 1990, until July 20, 1991.

Unlike Carol Burnett's previous variety shows, Carol & Company was an anthology series that applied an unusual repertory approach to television comedy. Every week, Burnett and her fellow players (Krause, Piven, Fay, Kiser, Barone and Kind) performed a different half-hour comedy playlet. Only the performers remained the same from week to week; there were no ongoing characters or plots, although there were guest stars from time to time including Betty White, Christopher Reeve, Swoosie Kurtz (who won an Emmy) and Burnett's daughter Carrie Hamilton. In 1991, Burnett's cohort, Tim Conway, made a cameo appearance as an audience member in the episode, "That Little Extra Something."

Shortly after the series' cancellation, Burnett switched back to her former network CBS to star in a short-lived revival of The Carol Burnett Show that aired from November 1 to December 27, 1991. It featured a new ensemble cast, including two Carol & Company players (Meagen Fay and Richard Kind) along with Jessica Lundy, Rick Aviles, Chris Barnes, Roger Kabler and weekly guest stars such as Vicki Lawrence, Martin Short, B.B. King and Jim Nabors. However, the series failed to catch on with the public and only six episodes of this revival were aired.

== Episodes ==
=== Series overview ===
Season	Episodes	Originally released	
Season	Episodes	First released	Last released
1	9	March 31, 1990	June 2, 1990
2	24	September 22, 1990	May 4, 1991

=== Season 1 (1990) ===
No. overall	No. in season	Title	Original release date	Viewers (millions)
1	1	"Bump in the Night"	March 31, 1990	27.7
Lois Carlyle (Burnett) is a wife fed up with her cold, sexist philandering husband (Kind) who hires a hit-man named Brian Beckworth (Kiser) out of the phone book to kill him.
2	2	"Reunion"	April 7, 1990	26.0
Georgette (Burnett) is a trans woman attending the 30th reunion at her high school. Swoosie Kurtz guest stars as Georgette’s ex-girlfriend from school.
3	3	"Mother from Hell"	April 14, 1990	24.6
A devoted mother (Burnett) is fed up with her two lazy, ungrateful adult offspring so she sues them for the money she spent on them throughout their adult lives.
4	4	"In-Laws Should Be Outlawed"	April 21, 1990	24.5
Two practical jokers have to cool it when they meet their prospective in-laws, a deadly duo into munitions.
5	5	"Battle of the Exes"	April 28, 1990	21.5
Dr. Elaine Daniels (Burnett) learns that her ex-husband/co-worker, Dr. Arthur Daniels (Alex Rocco), is dating a younger woman and to make him jealous, she flaunts a much younger man under Arthur's nose.
6	6	"Soap Gets in Your Eyes"	May 5, 1990	23.0
Barbara (Burnett), a fading soap opera star who feels threatened by an up-and-coming actress, learns a painful truth from Sam (Robert Guillaume) the security guard.
7	7	"Myna and the Messenger"	May 12, 1990	22.5
Myna Bouleray (Burnett), a small town resident, heeds advice from an angel (Howie Mandel) who suggests that she gamble her life's savings in Atlantic City to save her nearly bankrupt church.
8	8	"The Fabulous Bicker Girls"	May 26, 1990	18.5
Babe and Baby Bicker (Burnett and daughter Carrie Hamilton), a mother/daughter singing duo, feel their act may be threatened when Bobby (Robert Urich) comes between them.
9	9	"Kruber Alert"	June 2, 1990	15.7
Sally Trickleson (Burnett) is an irate, love-sick listener who storms into a radio station and confronts the pop psychologist announcer Dr. Doris Kruber (Glenda Jackson) during a live call-in program.

=== Season 2 (1990–91) ===
No. overall	No. in season	Title	Original release date	Viewers (millions)
10	1	"Grandma Gets It On"	September 22, 1990	20.6
Lillian Preskin (Burnett) is a frisky 82-year-old senior citizen who still has an eye for the gentlemen at her nursing home, much to the consternation of her daughter (Fay) who threatens to send her mother to a home run by nuns if she engages once more in sex with the residents.
11	2	"Diary of a Really, Really Mad Housewife"	September 29, 1990	20.8
Dorothy Tibbit has quite a day filled with unexpected difficulties when she tries to prepare a special meal for her husband's boss. This is the first of Dorothy Tibbit's three appearances.
12	3	"Goin' to the Chapel"	October 6, 1990	20.6
Evelyn Sweets (Burnett) is featured in two separate episodes about her "Chapel of Romance": Evelyn is approached by a woman with a ventriloquist's dummy who pleads with her to marry them in "Dummy Dearest"; Evelyn is approached by Chester Neff, who assumes that her ad's tag I'll marry anyone means that she will become his wife in "Being Out There".
13	4	"Guns and Rosie"	October 13, 1990	19.6
Three pistol-packing mamas capture an unarmed burglar (Richard Kind) who believes that guns are dangerous.
14	5	"Stiff Competition"	October 20, 1990	16.6
A woman (Carol Burnett) gets cold comfort from the death by freezing of her paramour's wife: the man's still in love with the woman.
15	6	"Here's to You, Mrs. Baldwin"	October 27, 1990	20.9
Lisa Baldwin (Burnett), a successful single businesswoman, is enchanted but unnerved when her son's college roommate, Patrick (Krause), expresses his admiration for her.
16	7	"Trisha Springs Eternal"	November 3, 1990	19.2
Trisha Durant (Betty White) is a college friend of Rosalind "Roz" Burke (Burnett) who comes to town and announces that she's taken the apartment next door to Roz – but Roz can't stand her.
17	8	"Mom and Dad Day Afternoon"	November 10, 1990	20.7
Frank and Julia Miller (Kiser and Burnett) are a bickering couple applying for a loan who witness an unusual robbery – the bank is being held up by their son (Krause).
18	9	"Driving Miss Crazy"	November 17, 1990	21.6
Dorothy Tibbit, a recovering stress victim, is put to the test of renewing her driver's license. This is the character's second appearance.
19	10	"The Jingle Belles"	November 24, 1990	21.3
Arlene Harvey and Kate Benton (Burnett and Bernadette Peters) are songwriters who strike a sour note when Kate alone is offered an audition with a record producer.
20	11	"Teacher, Teacher!"	December 1, 1990	19.9
Daisy Kornfeld (Burnett), a teacher, tries to talk her way out of a speeding ticket from a cop (Krause), her former student in whom she instilled a value system that doesn't bend the rules.
21	12	"Spudnik"	December 8, 1990	20.8
Veta Mae Klybocker (Burnett) is a spaced-out woman who prepares to rendezvous with aliens at a fishing dock and confronts Dakota (Nell Carter), a fisherwoman who resents having her solitude disturbed.
22	13	"No News Is Bad News"	January 5, 1991	21.9
A former game-show producer (Barone) turns a serious news program into a popular entertainment type show with an audience that decides on which stories to hear, and its once-respected anchor Christine Hayward (Burnett) into a self absorbed clown.
23	14	"Turning Tables"	January 19, 1991	17.0
Virtually nothing goes as planned for three couples out for a romantic evening at an elegant restaurant.
24	15	"That Little Extra Something"	January 26, 1991	21.3
A spoof of an old-fashioned murder mystery but complications ensue when Richard Kind's Aunt Wanda (Burnett) comes for a visit. Tim Conway makes a cameo appearance.
25	16	"A Fall from Grace"	February 2, 1991	20.0
An unusual clothes dryer springs sour old Grace into a fantasy land of Lost Stuff to discover such long departed items as a sock.
26	17	"Suture Self"	February 9, 1991	20.0
The eminent surgeon Doogie Howser (Neil Patrick Harris in a spoof of his TV show Doogie Howser, M.D.) is called in for a splinter removal from the toe of a recovering patient Dorothy Tibbit, whose character also appeared in the episodes Diary of a Really Really Mad Housewife and Driving Miss Crazy. This is the character's third appearance.
27	18	"High on Life"	February 16, 1991	20.2
A free-spirited man (Kiser) begs Margaret (Burnett) to live life on the edge – moments before her marriage to Herb (Kind).
28	19	"Momma Needs a New Pair of Shoes"	March 2, 1991	19.9
29	20	"Jewel of Denial"	March 9, 1991	15.3
A Sam Spade spoof has Carol Burnett playing a wisecracking private investigator.
30	21	"Intimate Behavior"	March 16, 1991	14.4
Hal Linden guest stars in a series of vignettes that take a musical look at intimate behavior in a café, an elevator, a support-group meeting, a dentist's office and an alley.
31	22	"Noah's Place"	April 13, 1991	17.2
A cafe is the setting for a reunion between lovers, and for negotiations between a talking head and an agent.
32	23	"Overnight Male"	April 27, 1991	16.2
Myrna Fallows (Burnett), a postal worker, dreams that she gets to date her fantasy mailman (Christopher Reeve), but they are often interrupted by a co-worker (Kind).
33	24	"For Love or Money"	May 4, 1991	19.4
In a sendup of 1940s gangster films, wealthy Agnes Pringle (Burnett) contemplates a lover's revenge while "Lefty" Malone (Kind) and "Dollface" (Barone) join in on the scheming on a cruise ship. A one-hour season finale.

== Guest stars ==
- Robert Urich as Mr. Sammy
- David Strassman as Joe
- Christopher Reeve as Drew
- Neil Patrick Harris as Will
- Betty White as Betty
- Bernadette Peters as Herself
- Alex Rocco as Jimmy
- Nell Carter as Molly
- Swoosie Kurtz as Emma
- Glenda Jackson as Tina
- Tim Conway as Bob
- Howie Mandel as Howie
- Carrie Hamilton
- Dennis Burkley
- Martin Ferrero
- Richard Karn
- Pat Crawford Brown
- Burt Reynolds

== Broadcast history ==
- March 1990 – April 1990: NBC Saturday, 9:30–10:00 PM
- April 1990 – June 1990: NBC Saturday, 10:00–10:30 PM
- August 1990 – March 1991: NBC Saturday, 10:00–10:30 PM
- March 1991 – May 1991: NBC Saturday, 10:00-11:00 PM
- July 1991: NBC Saturday, 10:30–11:00 PM

== Awards and nominations ==
Year	Award	Category	Name	Result
1990	Golden Globe Award	Best Actress – Television Series Musical or Comedy	Carol Burnett	Nominated
1990	Primetime Emmy Award	Outstanding Guest Actress in a Comedy Series	Swoosie Kurtz	Won
1990	Primetime Emmy Award	Outstanding Main Title Theme Music	Dan Foliart, Howard Pearl	Nominated
1991	Primetime Emmy Award	Outstanding Costume Design for a Variety or Music Program	Ret Turner, Bob Mackie	Won
1991	Primetime Emmy Award	Outstanding Art Direction for a Variety or Music Program	David Sackeroff, Portia Iversen	Nominated
