= Soul Man (TV series) =

American sitcom (1997–1998)

- Also known as: Father's Day
- Created by: Carmen Finestra; David McFadzean; Matt Williams
- Starring: Dan Aykroyd; Anthony Clark; Kevin Sheridan; Brendon Ryan Barrett; Courtney Chase; Spencer Breslin; Michael Finiguerra; Dakin Matthews; Anne Lambton
- Theme music composer: Isaac Hayes and David Porter
- Opening theme: "Soul Man"
- Country of origin: United States
- Original language: English
- No. of seasons: 2
- No. of episodes: 25

Production
- Executive producers: Carmen Finestra; David McFadzean; Matt Williams; Dan Aykroyd; Elliot Shoenman
- Producer: Gayle S. Maffeo
- Production locations: Royal Oak, Michigan (setting); New York, NY (actual filming location)
- Camera setup: Videotape; Multi-camera
- Running time: 22 minutes
- Production companies: Hostage Productions; Wind Dancer Production Group; Touchstone Television

Original release
- Network: ABC
- Release: April 15, 1997 – May 26, 1998

Related
- Home Improvement

Soul Man is an American sitcom starring Dan Aykroyd that aired on ABC from April 15, 1997, to May 26, 1998. A total of 25 half-hour episodes were produced over two seasons.

The series premiered on April 15, 1997, and was picked up for a second season of 22 half-hour episodes after only three episodes aired for the first season. Despite ranking 29th in its 2nd and final season, it ended on May 26, 1998. Internationally, the series was also aired on the Seven Network in Australia. A four-year-old Spencer Breslin made his TV debut and was a series regular for the three-episode-long 1997 first season, in which he played the youngest child of Aykroyd.

The theme song was "Soul Man" written by Isaac Hayes and David Porter. Aykroyd was closely associated with the song, having released a cover of it in 1979 with his band The Blues Brothers.

== Premise ==
Mike Weber (played by Aykroyd) is a widowed Episcopal priest who must deal with his four children, his quirky parishioners in Royal Oak, Michigan, and a wet-behind-the-ears curate who happens to be the nephew of his bishop.

== Cast ==
The show's principal cast, circa Season 2.

- Dan Aykroyd as Rev. Mike Weber
- Anthony Clark as Rev. Todd Tucker
- Kevin Sheridan as Kenny Weber, Mike's first son
- Brendon Ryan Barrett as Andy Weber, Mike's second son
- Courtney Chase as Meredith Weber, Mike's daughter
- Spencer Breslin (season 1) & Michael Finiguerra (season 2) as Fred Weber, Mike's third son
- Dakin Matthews as Bishop Peter Jerome

== Home Improvement connection ==
Like Home Improvement, the show was produced by The Walt Disney Company's Touchstone Television. Tim Allen appeared as Tim Taylor in the second episode, "Communion Wine and Convicts", who ended up cutting the hole too big, causing the basin to fall through the floor.

In the Season 1 finale episode "Cinderella and the Funeral", Richard Karn appeared as Al Borland who came to fix the church's furnace. Reference was made to Tim and the holy water basin falling through the hole he cut.

In the second season, Zachary Ty Bryan appeared in the episode "Public Embarrassment and Todd's First Sermon" playing Brad Taylor.

Mike Weber later appeared on Home Improvement as the priest of Al Borland. He was hired to put in a new stand for a holy water basin in the season seven episode "Losing My Religion".

== Episodes ==
=== Series overview ===
Season	Episodes	Originally released	
Season	Episodes	First released	Last released
1	3	April 15, 1997	April 29, 1997
2	22	September 30, 1997	May 26, 1998

=== Season 1 (1997) ===
No. overall	No. in season	Title	Directed by	Written by	Original release date	Prod. code	Viewers (millions)
1	1	"Urges and Lies"	Andrew Tsao	Carmen Finestra & David McFadzean & Matt Williams	April 15, 1997	F–602	18.33
2	2	"Communion Wine and Convicts"	Unknown	Unknown	April 22, 1997	F–601	17.69
3	3	"Cinderella and the Funeral"	Unknown	Unknown	April 29, 1997	F–603	14.00

=== Season 2 (1997–98) ===
No. overall	No. in season	Title	Directed by	Written by	Original release date	Prod. code	Viewers (millions)
4	1	"Mike's Awakening"	Andrew Tsao	Tom Leopold	September 30, 1997	F–605	17.11
5	2	"Hello Todd, Hello Nancy, Goodbye Harley"	Andrew Tsao	David Richardson	October 7, 1997	F–604	17.44
6	3	"The Lost Sheep Squadron"	John Pasquin	Danny Smith	October 21, 1997	F–606	14.19
7	4	"Trick and Treat"	John Pasquin	Jon Pollack	October 28, 1997	F–607	12.97
8	5	"Public Embarrassment and Todd's First Sermon"	John Pasquin	Pat Dougherty	November 4, 1997	F–608	11.16
9	6	"Camping and Housekeepers"	John Pasquin	Steve Paymer	November 18, 1997	F–609	16.40
10	7	"Three Priests and a Baby"	John Pasquin	Sarit Catz & Gloria Ketterer	November 25, 1997	F–610	12.95
11	8	"Attic Box Blues"	John Pasquin	Sarit Catz & Gloria Ketterer	December 2, 1997	F–611	13.52
12	9	"Christmas Ruined My Life"	Gil Junger	Pat Dougherty	December 16, 1997	F–612	14.00
13	10	"Yes Sir, That's My Baby"	Don Scardino	Carmen Finestra & David McFadzean	January 6, 1998	F–613	13.72
14	11	"Holy Rollers"	Ted Wass	Jon Pollack	January 13, 1998	F–614	13.35
15	12	"A Kiss Is Just a Kiss"	Don Scardino	Danny Smith	January 20, 1998	F–615	13.85
16	13	"The Stan Plan"	Ted Wass	Pat Dougherty & Danny Smith	February 10, 1998	F–616	12.30
17	14	"The Choir Boys"	Gil Junger	Steve Paymer	February 17, 1998	F–617	12.19
18	15	"Todd and the Bod"	Gil Junger	Sarit Catz & Gloria Ketterer	February 24, 1998	F–618	15.60
19	16	"Grabbed by an Angel"	Will Mackenzie	Karin Kelly	April 14, 1998	F–619	12.62
20	17	"Just the Three of Us"	Peter Bonerz	Jon Pollack	April 21, 1998	F–620	11.76
21	18	"Raising Heck"	Ted Wass	Sarit Catz & Gloria Ketterer	April 28, 1998	F–621	10.91
22	19	"The Good Shepard"	Ted Wass	Danny Smith	May 5, 1998	F–623	10.49
23	20	"Who Killed St. Shepherd?"	Ted Wass	Jon Pollack	May 12, 1998	F–625	9.38
24	21	"Play Ball"	Ted Wass	Pat Dougherty	May 19, 1998	F–624	9.88
25	22	"Little Black Dress"	Peter Bonerz	Mary Pat Walsh	May 26, 1998	F–622	8.69
