= David McFadzean =

American dramatist

- Born: David Campbell McFadzean; April 9, 1947 (age 79)
- Education: University of Evansville
- Occupations: Playwright, television producer, television writer
- Years active: 1988-present
- Known for: Co-creator of Home Improvement
- Spouse: Elizabeth "Liz" McFadzean
- Children: Meredith McFadzean Barnes; James "Court" McFadzean

David Campbell McFadzean (born April 9, 1947) is an American television producer, television writer, film producer and playwright. He is best known for co-creating the ABC sitcom Home Improvement with Carmen Finestra and Matt Williams.

== Career ==
McFadzean began his career as a playwright in Chicago, later earning a master's degree in theater at Illinois State University. He later moved to California, where he was once the benefactor of the Christian-based Lamb's Players Theater Company in San Diego, California. While attending the University of Evansville in Indiana, where he earned a bachelor's degree in theater, it was there he met Matt Williams. McFadzean would be the first person that Williams hired for the writing staff of the first season of the sitcom Roseanne. McFadzean and Williams together with Carmen Finestra formed the production company Wind Dancer Productions in 1989. They went on to create and produce Carol & Company, Thunder Alley, Buddies, Soul Man and their most successful creation, the sitcom Home Improvement starring Tim Allen.

McFadzean's film producing credits include Firelight (1997), Where the Heart Is (2000), What Women Want (2000), Walker Payne (2006) and Bernie (2011).

== Personal life ==
McFadzean currently lives outside Los Angeles in La Cañada Flintridge with his wife Elizabeth. He has two children, Meredith and Court. He is a Christian.
