= Matt Williams (producer) =

American television producer & writer (born 1951)

- Born: Mark Williams; April 18, 1951 (age 75); Evansville, Indiana, U.S.
- Education: University of Evansville
- Occupations: Television producer, television writer, professor
- Years active: 1980s–2018 (television)
- Spouse: Angelina Fiordellisi
- Children: 2

Matthew Williams (born Mark Williams; April 18, 1951) is an American professor, writer, and former television producer. He is best known for his work as a writer and producer on The Cosby Show and Home Improvement.

== Career ==
Before becoming a writer and producer, Williams was an actor, appearing in commercials, theater and as Ben Martin on the CBN soap opera Another Life in the early 1980s.

In mid to late 1980s, Williams was a writer/producer for The Cosby Show and A Different World. In 1988, Williams created the TV series Roseanne, starring comedian Roseanne Barr. Barr became upset learning that he was credited as the creator. During the first season, she refused to say some of his lines and by the thirteenth episode threatened to quit if he wasn't fired. ABC fired him, but he retained "created by" credit for its series run and also for its spin-off The Conners.

In the 1990s, Williams, along with Carmen Finestra and David McFadzean, formed the production company Wind Dancer Productions, and one of their many credits was creating and executive producing the TV series Home Improvement. Other series included Carol & Company, Thunder Alley, Buddies, Soul Man.

Additionally, he has written the play "Between Daylight and Boonville", co-wrote and produced the film Wild Hearts Can't Be Broken (1991), directed and co-produced the film Where the Heart Is (2000) starring Natalie Portman, and produced the film What Women Want (2000) starring Mel Gibson and Helen Hunt. He also wrote and directed Walker Payne (2006) starring Jason Patric, Drea de Matteo, and Sam Shepard and produced Bernie (2011) starring Jack Black, Shirley MacLaine and Matthew McConaughey. Williams retired from the television industry in 2018.

In 2019, his Off-Broadway play Fear ran at the Lucille Lortel Theatre, starring Enrico Colantoni and Alex Garfin, directed by Tea Alagic. In 2024, he published the book Glimpses: A Comedy Writer's Take on Life, Love, and All That Spiritual Stuff.

== Personal life ==
Williams, whose birth name is Mark, is a native of Evansville, Indiana; he graduated from the University of Evansville and did post-graduate work in theater at The University of New Orleans.

Williams and his wife, Angelina Fiordellisi, have two children. As of 2024, the couple reside in a three-story townhouse in the West Village in Manhattan, New York. Williams has taught at the Columbia University School of the Arts as an adjunct professor. He is a Christian.

== Bibliography ==
- Glimpses: A Comedy Writer's Take on Life, Love, and All That Spiritual Stuff. Forefront Books. 2024. ISBN 978-1637632499.
