= Vishwas Mudagal =

Indian writer and entrepreneur (born 1981)

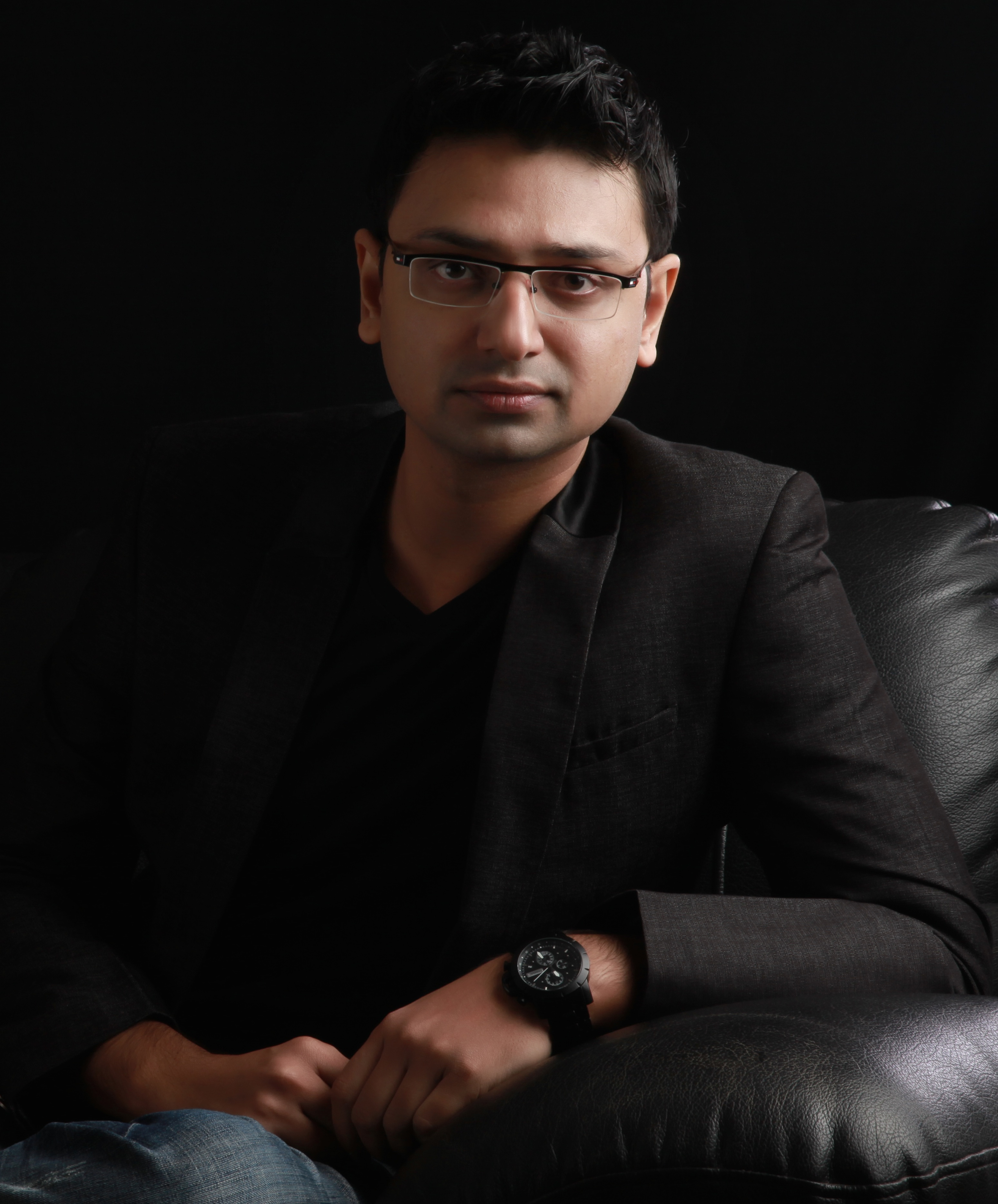
- Vishwas Mudagal
- Born: 26 October 1981 (age 44); Dharwad, Karnataka, India
- Education: R.V. College of Engineering
- Occupations: Writer, entrepreneur
- Writing career
- Language: English
- Notable work: Losing My Religion

Vishwas Mudagal is an Indian writer and entrepreneur.

Losing My Religion is his debut novel. Mudagal's most recent work is the science-fiction and mythology novel The Last Avatar – Age of Kalki (2018).

== Early life and education ==
Mudagal was born in Dharwad, Karnataka. He received a Bachelor of Engineering degree from the RV College of Engineering, Bangalore.

== Literary career ==
The idea for Mudagal's debut novel, Losing My Religion, came from his real-life experience, when he shut down his Internet-based firm. In the novel, the protagonist, Rishi Rai, faces a similar situation of bankruptcy but his life takes a turn when he sets on a journey with Alex, an American hippie.

Mudagal's second novel, The Last Avatar – Age of Kalki, introduces Indian superheroes with roots deep in Hindu mythology and ethos.

== See also ==
- List of Indian writers
- List of novelists
- List of people from Karnataka
