= Andrew Tsao =

American filmmaker

Andrew Huei Tsao
- Born: August 3, 1959 (age 67); United States
- Education: California Institute of the Arts, MA, Fine Arts, 1990
- Occupations: TV, Film and Theatre producer and director
- Years active: 1992-2008

Andrew Tsao (born August 3, 1959) is an American theater, film and television producer and director.

== Early life ==
He earned his Master of Fine Arts from California Institute of the Arts.

== Career ==
Tsao worked in regional theater and off-Broadway. He became resident director of the Indiana Repertory Theatre where he directed, served as the theater's literary manager and taught acting. He was invited to become artistic director of the New Harmony Project, a writer's lab in New Harmony, Indiana. There he oversaw development of plays, musicals, screenplays and TV pilots.

Tsao then moved to Los Angeles to work in television. He became a series director on ABC's Home Improvement, produced and directed NBC'S Working, Soul Man, among others, and dozens of other prime time programs, including episodes of Friends, Caroline in the City, Suddenly Susan, Jesse, The Single Guy, In The House, The Jeff Foxworthy Show, DAG, Madigan Men, Sabrina, The Tick, George Lopez, Phil Of The Future and Wizards Of Waverly Place.

In Los Angeles, Tsao was invited to direct two productions for Shakespeare Festival L.A. (The Tempest, and Julius Caesar) a world premiere opera for Los Angeles Opera (On Gold Mountain), He directed two short films: Brightness which was awarded the Gold Special Jury Prize for 2001 at the WorldFest in Houston and Solstice. Theater credits include the world premiere of Theodore Drieser's Sister Carrie for Indiana Rep, and The Tempest at East West Players in Los Angeles, The Merry Wives Of Windsor for Oregon Shakespeare Festival, and Nilo Cruz's adaptation of Gabriel García Márquez A Very Old Man With Enormous Wings for Center Theater Group in Los Angeles.

Internationally, he has produced and directed noted original devised theater works at the Edinburgh Fringe Festival. Tsao was an associate professor of dramatic arts at the University of Washington School of Drama where he was a member of the faculty of the Graduate Professional Acting and Directing Programs, headed the undergraduate drama program from 2011 to 2017, led summer drama programs at the Edinburgh Festivals and worked with the University of Washington College of Arts and Sciences C21: Liberal Learning in the 21st Century innovation in higher education program.

In 2003 and 2004, Tsao was an executive consultant and creative director for The Walsin Company in Shanghai, where he oversaw the development of themed entertainment concepts for a multimillion-dollar commercial real estate project.

In 2018, Andrew founded The Studio Seattle, a small acting school.

=== Screenwriting and producing ===
As screenwriter, Tsao contributed story and dialogue for Taiwanese director Edward Yang's feature film Mahjong, which won the Special Mention Prize at the Berlin Film Festival in 1996. He has also produced four international touring theatre works as well as the TV pilot "A Little Dark" in 2024.

=== Actor ===
As an actor, he appeared stage productions and portrayed Trofimov in The Cherry Orchard directed by Libby Appel and played the role of David in the feature film Mahjong directed by Edward Yang. He appeared as himself in the 2009 documentary My Big Break.

He was awarded the Center for Leadership Development's Arts Award by the City of Indianapolis, served as a grants panelist and on-site reviewer for the National Endowment for the Arts and volunteers as a media advisor for public advocacy groups, Asian voter registration initiatives and local political campaigns.

== Awards ==
In 2012 he was awarded a Donald E. Peterson Endowed Fellowship for creative work at the University of Washington. Additionally, he was awarded the City of Indianapolis' Arts award and the Gold Special Jury prize for his short film Brightness at the 2001 Houston Worldfest film festival.
