= Bruce Ferber =

American screenwriter

- Born: Bruce Ferber; New York City
- Occupation: Writer
- Years active: 1981–present
- Website: bruceferber.net

Bruce Ferber is an American novelist and television writer/producer.

== Career ==
Ferber's first novel, Elevating Overman was published to much acclaim in May, 2012. His second novel, Cascade Falls, was published in April 2015, and received equally stellar reviews. It won the 2015 Indie Awards Gold Prize for Humor, adult fiction, and the Bronze prize for General, adult fiction.

In July 2019, the non-fiction anthology, The Way We Work: On the Job in Hollywood was published, with Ferber serving as editor, and also contributing an essay to this overview of the entertainment business. Among the list of fellow contributors—J.J. Abrams, Robert Towne, Chris Rock, Gabrielle Union, John McNaughton, David Kukoff, Nancy Nigrosh, Seth Freeman, Billy Van Zandt, and Rocky Lang. The positive response to the compilation was reflected in Midwest Book Review's assertion that "No media studies collection should be without this revealing guide, which is at once entertaining and educational."

Ferber is a television comedy veteran, having written for and produced shows such as Bosom Buddies, Growing Pains, Duet, Coach, Home Improvement and Sabrina the Teenage Witch. He served as showrunner and Executive Producer of Sabrina and Home Improvement, for which he received Emmy and Gold Globe nominations, People's Choice, Kids' Choice, and Environmental Media Awards. In 2004, he produced and directed the documentary film, Pray For Tucson, a weekend in the life of the Howard Dean presidential campaign.

In April 2014 Ferber was selected as a Keynote speaker for the Erma Bombeck Writers' Workshop.
