= Walker Payne =

2006 film by Matt Williams

- Directed by: Matt Williams
- Written by: Matt Williams; Alex Paraskevas
- Produced by: Judd Payne; Matthew Rhodes
- Starring: Jason Patric; Drea de Matteo; KaDee Strickland; Sam Shepard; Bruce Dern
- Cinematography: James L. Carter
- Edited by: Ian Crafford
- Music by: Mason Daring
- Production companies: Wind Dancer Films; Persistent Entertainment
- Distributed by: Screen Media Ventures
- Release date: April 27, 2006
- Running time: 117 minutes
- Country: United States
- Language: English

Walker Payne is a 2006 film directed and co-written by Matt Williams and starring Jason Patric, Drea de Matteo, KaDee Strickland, Sam Shepard and Bruce Dern. It was shown at the Tribeca Film Festival on April 27, 2006.

== Plot ==
The license plate on Walker's old Ford pickup truck says the year is 1957. The coal mine in an Illinois town is shutting down due to government regulations about sulfur content. So Walker is out of work. Lou Ann, the mother of his children, still demands child support. Walker takes out all his money from the bank where Audrey works, and he and Audrey eventually date and finally move in together. While Walker is attending a baseball game with his dog Brute, a man observes that Brute is a breed well-suited to fighting. Walker will not let his dog fight. Then Lou Ann insists on going to nursing school, which will cost a great deal of money, and she expects Walker to pay or he will never see his kids again. So Walker does what he has to do. Brute is good, but Walker is reluctant to keep fighting. However, he needs the money and continues until Brute is killed and he gets arrested for dogfighting. Lou Ann meets Audrey and then abandons them while Walker is in jail, but Walker's friend Chester agrees to take the kids until Walker is free.

== Cast ==
- Jason Patric as Walker Payne
- Drea de Matteo as Lou Ann
- KaDee Strickland as Audrey
- Chelsea Lopez as Sarah
- Gabrielle Brennan as Beth
- Bruce Dern as Chester
- Sam Shepard as Syrus
