= Carmen Finestra =

American producer and TV writer

Carmen Finestra (born June 26, 1947) is an American producer and TV writer who currently is partnered with Matt Williams and David McFadzean in Wind Dancer Productions. For Wind Dancer, Finestra has produced or executive produced Firelight, Where the Heart Is, What Women Want, Soul Man, Thunder Alley and his company's best known series, Home Improvement, which starred Tim Allen as a sarcastic home-improvement host, and in turn based on Allen's stand-up comedy routines.

== Early life ==
Finestra was born to Italian immigrants in Harrisburg, Pennsylvania, and initially attended a seminary college for two years to become a Catholic priest before transferring to Penn State University, where he was a member of Sigma Alpha Epsilon fraternity. He earned his BA in 1971.

== Career ==
After a stint as an Off-Broadway actor, Finestra turned to writing for the likes of Johnny Cash (for one of Cash's summer series) and Steve Martin, as well as episodes of Chico and the Man, Good Times, The Love Boat and Punky Brewster. Finestra's big break came when he began writing for The Cosby Show in 1984, where he would remain until 1990, leaving the show as supervising producer. Finestra received two Emmy nominations as one of the producers of The Cosby Show and another Emmy nomination for co-writing an episode of the hit series. He also did three guest star appearances on The Cosby Show (episodes 4.12, 6.2 and 6.14).

In 1991, Finestra, along with Matt Williams and David McFadzean formed Wind Dancer Productions, and became a writer and co-executive producer for Home Improvement, capacities he filled until the series' end in 1999. His work on the sitcom would land three Emmy and two Golden Globe nominations for him. Other credits included the TV series Thunder Alley and Soul Man, and the films Firelight (1997), Where the Heart Is (2000) and What Women Want (2000).

Finestra was honored as a Distinguished Alumnus of Penn State in 1998. Penn State named an off campus video editing lab, The Carmen Finestra Digital Editing Lab, in his honor at Innovation Park, an off site technology hub on the University Park campus.
