= Home Improvement (TV series) =

American sitcom (1991–1999)

- Genre: Sitcom
- Created by: Carmen Finestra; David McFadzean; Matt Williams
- Based on: Stand-up comedy material by Tim Allen
- Starring: Tim Allen; Patricia Richardson; Earl Hindman; Taran Noah Smith; Jonathan Taylor Thomas; Zachery Ty Bryan; Richard Karn; Debbe Dunning
- Theme music composer: Dan Foliart
- Opening theme: "Iron John's Rock"
- Country of origin: United States
- Original language: English
- No. of seasons: 8
- No. of episodes: 204 (list of episodes)

Production
- Executive producers: Carmen Finestra; David McFadzean; Matt Williams; Bob Bendetson (seasons 3–5); Elliot Shoenman (seasons 3–8); Bruce Ferber (seasons 4, episode 6–season 8); Charlie Hauck (seasons 6–7); Tim Allen (seasons 6–8); Laurie Gelman (season 8)
- Producers: Gayle S. Maffeo; Alan Padula (seasons 4–8); John Pasquin (seasons 1–2); Frank McKemy (seasons 4–6)
- Production locations: Soundstage 4; Walt Disney Studios; Burbank, California
- Cinematography: Donald A. Morgan
- Editors: Marco Zappia; James Spach (season 8); Richard Russell (seasons 6–7); Roger Ames Berger (seasons 3–5); Alex Gimenez (seasons 1–2)
- Camera setup: Videotape; Multi-camera
- Running time: 22 minutes
- Production companies: Wind Dancer Productions; Touchstone Television

Original release
- Network: ABC
- Release: September 17, 1991 – May 25, 1999

Related
- Buddies

Home Improvement is an American sitcom television series starring Tim Allen, originally airing on ABC from September 17, 1991, to May 25, 1999, with a total of 204 half-hour episodes spanning eight seasons. The series is set in suburban Detroit. It was created by Carmen Finestra, David McFadzean, and Matt Williams and was one of the most-watched sitcoms in the United States during the 1990s, winning many awards and being ABC's number-one sitcom for most of its run. The series also launched stand-up comedian Allen's acting career and grossed more than $500 million in syndication revenue by 1996.

== Show background ==
Based on the stand-up comedy of Tim Allen, Home Improvement made its debut on ABC on September 17, 1991, and was one of the highest-rated sitcoms for almost the entire decade. It went to No. 2 in the ratings during the 1993–1994 season, the same year Allen had the No. 1 book (Don't Stand Too Close to a Naked Man) and film (The Santa Clause).

Beginning in season 2, Home Improvement began each episode with a cold open, which features the show's logo during the teaser. From season 4 until the end of the series in 1999, an anthropomorphic version of the logo was used in different types of animation.

== Episodes ==
Season	Episodes	Originally released		Rank	Viewers (millions)
Season	Episodes	First released	Last released	Rank	Viewers (millions)
1	24	September 17, 1991	May 5, 1992	4	28.9
2	25	September 16, 1992	May 19, 1993	3	31.5
3	25	September 15, 1993	May 25, 1994	2	35.2
4	26	September 20, 1994	May 23, 1995	3	32.9
5	26	September 19, 1995	May 21, 1996	7	25.9
6	25	September 17, 1996	May 20, 1997	9	23.1
7	25	September 23, 1997	May 19, 1998	10	19.5
8	28	September 22, 1998	May 25, 1999	10	17.7

== Plot details and storylines ==
=== Taylor family ===
The series centers on the Taylor family, which consists of Tim (Tim Allen), his wife Jill (Patricia Richardson) and their three sons: Brad (Zachery Ty Bryan), Randy (Jonathan Taylor Thomas), and Mark (Taran Noah Smith). The Taylors live in suburban Detroit, and they have a neighbor named Wilson.

=== Tool Time ===
Each episode includes Tim's own Binford-sponsored home improvement show, called Tool Time, a show-within-a-show. In hosting this show, Tim is joined by his friend and mild-mannered co-host Al Borland (Richard Karn), and a "Tool Time girl" — first Lisa (Pamela Anderson) and later Heidi (Debbe Dunning) — whose main duty is to introduce the pair at the beginning of the show with the line "Does everybody know what time it is?" In reply, the audience yells, "TOOL TIME!" The Tool Time girl also assists Tim and Al during the show by bringing them tools.

Tool Time was conceived as a parody of the PBS home-improvement show This Old House. Tim and Al are caricatures of the two principal cast members of This Old House, host Bob Vila and master carpenter Norm Abram. Al has a beard and always wears plaid flannel shirts when taping an episode, reflecting Norm Abram's appearance on This Old House. Bob Vila appeared as a guest star on several episodes of Home Improvement, while Tim Allen and Pamela Anderson both appeared on Bob Vila's show Home Again.

=== Wilson ===
A running gag on the show concerned Tim's neighbor, Wilson W. Wilson Jr (played by actor Earl Hindman). Tim (and sometimes other family members) would chat with Wilson over the backyard fence that separated their two properties, meaning that Wilson was only seen mostly from his eyes (and sometimes his nose) upward, with the rest obscured by the wooden fence. In later episodes, as Wilson was also seen in other environments, part of his face would always be obscured — he would be wearing a mask for a costume party, or a balaclava in fierce snowy weather, or standing in such a way that the view of his face was partially blocked by something in the room. In the entire run of the show, Wilson is never once seen full-face, with the exception of the final episode.

== Characters ==
=== Main ===
Characters	Actor/Actress	Episodes	Seasons
Tim Taylor	Tim Allen	(204 episodes, 1991–1999)	starring seasons 1–8
Jill Taylor (née-Patterson)	Patricia Richardson	(204 episodes,1991–1999)	starring seasons 1–8
Wilson Wilson Jr.	Earl Hindman	(202 episodes, 1991–1999)	starring seasons 1–8
Mark Taylor	Taran Noah Smith	(201 episodes, 1991–1999)	starring seasons 1–8
Randall William "Randy" Taylor	Jonathan Taylor Thomas	(179 episodes, 1991–1998)	starring seasons 1–8 (until episode 178, guest star thereafter)
Bradley Michael "Brad" Taylor	Zachery Ty Bryan	(202 episodes, 1991–1999)	starring seasons 1–8
Albert "Al" Borland	Richard Karn	(201 episodes, 1991–1999)	recurring season 1; starring seasons 2–8
Heidi Keppert	Debbe Dunning	(148 episodes, 1993–1999)	recurring seasons 3–6; starring seasons 7–8

=== Recurring ===
Characters	Actor/Actress	Episodes	Seasons
Marty Taylor	William O'Leary	(30 episodes, 1994–1999)	4–8
Harry Turner	Blake Clark	(24 episodes, 1994–1999)	4–8
Lisa	Pamela Anderson	(23 episodes, 1991–1993, 1997)	1–2 and 6
Benny Baroni	Jimmy Labriola	(16 episodes, 1994–1999)	3–8
Ilene Markham	Sherry Hursey	(16 episodes, 1993–1997)	3–6
Pete Bilker	Mickey Jones	(13 episodes, 1991–1999)	1–8
Dwayne Hoover	Gary McGurk	(11 episodes, 1991–1999)	1–8
Rock Flanagan	Casey Sander	(10 episodes, 1991–1999)	1–8
Trudy McHale	Megan Cavanagh	(5 episodes, 1998–1999)	7–8

== Production ==
The series ended after eight seasons in 1999. Richardson was offered $25 million to do a ninth season; Allen was offered $50 million. The two declined the offer, and the series came to an end as a result.

== Michigan college and university apparel ==
Throughout the show, Tim Taylor would often wear sweatshirts or T-shirts from various Michigan-based colleges and universities. These were usually sent by the schools to the show for him to wear during an episode. Because Allen considered Michigan his home state, the rule was that only Michigan schools would get the free advertising. There were two notable exceptions. During the episode "Workshop 'Til You Drop" Tim wears a Wofford College (South Carolina) sweatshirt. And in "The Wood, the Bad and the Hungry" he is seen wearing an Owens Community College (Ohio) sweatshirt.

College or university	City (of main campus)	Episode	Season
Albion College	Albion	My Dinner with Wilson	4
Alpena Community College	Alpena	Engine and a Haircut, Two Fights	5
Aquinas College	Grand Rapids	Crazy For You	3
Baker College	Flint Township	No Place Like Home	6
Bay College	Escanaba	Her Cheatin' Mind	5
Calvin College	Grand Rapids	Eve of Construction	3
Central Michigan University	Mount Pleasant	Blow-Up	3
Cleary University	Howell	You're Driving Me Crazy; You're Driving Me Nuts	2
Cornerstone University	Grand Rapids	Talk to Me	4
Davenport University	Grand Rapids	Room Without a View	5
Eastern Michigan University	Ypsilanti	To Build or Not to Build	2
Eastern Michigan University	Ypsilanti	Let Them Eat Cake	5
Eastern Michigan University	Ypsilanti	Believe It or Not	7
Ferris State University	Big Rapids	Be True to Your Tool	3
Grand Valley State University	Allendale	What You See is What You Get	3
Henry Ford Community College	Dearborn	A House Divided	4
Hillsdale College	Hillsdale	The Naked Truth	4
Hope College	Holland	Talk to Me	4
Hope College	Holland	Shopping Around	5
Kalamazoo College	Kalamazoo	When Harry Kept Delores	5
Kellogg Community College	Battle Creek	Future Shock	6
Kellogg Community College	Battle Creek	Jill and Her Sisters	6
Lake Michigan College	Benton Township	Eye on Tim	5
Lake Superior State University	Sault Sainte Marie	Brother, Can You Spare a Hot Rod	4
Lawrence Tech	Southfield	High School Confidential	5
Madonna University	Livonia	Oh, Brother	5
Marygrove College	Detroit	The Route of All Evil	4
Michigan State University	East Lansing	Frozen Moments	3
Michigan State University	East Lansing	It Was the Best of Tims, It Was the Worst of Tims	3
Michigan Tech	Houghton	A Hardware Habit to Break	8
Mott Community College	Flint	Wilson's World	6
Northwood University	Midland	A Sew, Sew Evening	3
Northern Michigan University	Marquette	Swing Time	3
Northwestern Michigan College	Traverse City	Chicago Hope	5
Oakland University	Auburn Hills	Slip Slidin' Away	3
Owens Community College	Toledo, Ohio	The Wood, the Bad and the Hungry	6
Saginaw Valley State University	University Center	The Eyes Don't Have It	4
University of Michigan	Ann Arbor	Borland Ambition	4
University of Michigan	Ann Arbor	Super Bowl Fever	4
University of Michigan	Ann Arbor	A Marked Man	4
University of Michigan	Ann Arbor	Advise and Repent	5
University of Michigan	Ann Arbor	The Vasectomy One	5
University of Michigan	Ann Arbor	Family Un-Ties	6
University of Michigan	Ann Arbor	An Older Woman	7
University of Michigan	Ann Arbor	Room at the Top	7
Walsh College	Troy	Dollars and Sense	3
Wayne State	Detroit	Olde Shoppe Teacher	4
Wayne State	Detroit	Burnin' Love	6
Western Michigan University	Kalamazoo	May the Best Man Win	2
Western Michigan University	Kalamazoo	It Was the Best of Tims, It Was the Worst of Tims	3
Western Michigan University	Kalamazoo	That's My Momma	5
Western Michigan University	Kalamazoo	Future Shock	6
Western Michigan University	Kalamazoo	A Night to Dismember	7
Western Michigan University	Kalamazoo	Taylor Got Game	8
Wofford College	Spartanburg, South Carolina	Workshop 'Til You Drop	6

== Syndication ==
In the United States, Home Improvement began airing in broadcast syndication in September 1995, distributed via Buena Vista Television (now Disney–ABC Domestic Television) and continued to be syndicated until 2007, in a manner similar to Seinfeld and The Simpsons after they began airing in broadcast syndication. Episodes of Home Improvement were not aired in order of their production code number or original airdate. On cable, the series started airing in 2002 on superstations TBS and WGN America. It later ran on Nick at Nite, and its sister network TV Land and eventually the Hallmark Channel in 2013. The show's creators brought a lawsuit against Disney in 2013 alleging that Disney sold the syndication rights for the show at "well below market value" including offering the syndication rights in New York for "no monetary compensation". The lawsuit was settled in 2019. Terms of the settlement were not disclosed. Since 2019, the series is currently airing on Laff.

== Home media ==
Buena Vista Home Entertainment has released all eight seasons on DVD in Regions 1, 2, and 4. Season 8 has the "Backstage Pass" (which immediately followed "The Long and Winding Road, Part III")

On May 10, 2011, Walt Disney Studios released a complete series box set entitled Home Improvement: 20th Anniversary Complete Collection on DVD in Region 1 and in Region 2 on February 1, 2016 entitled Home Improvement: The Complete Collection. The 25-disc collection features all 204 episodes of the series as well as all special features contained on the previously released season sets; it is encased in special collectible packaging, a Home Improvement toolbox with a Binford "All-In-One Tool" tape measure.

The series became available on Netflix on February 1, 2025.

DVD name	Ep#	Release dates		
DVD name	Ep#	Region 1	Region 2	Region 4
The Complete First Season	24	November 23, 2004	July 14, 2005	June 28, 2005
The Complete Second Season	25	June 7, 2005	October 13, 2005	July 20, 2005
The Complete Third Season	25	November 22, 2005	January 12, 2006	January 16, 2006
The Complete Fourth Season	26	June 6, 2006	December 6, 2007	December 5, 2007
The Complete Fifth Season	26	November 14, 2006	March 6, 2008	April 2, 2008
The Complete Sixth Season	25	May 15, 2007	November 13, 2008	December 3, 2008
The Complete Seventh Season	25	August 7, 2007	April 2, 2009	March 18, 2009
The Complete Eighth Season	28	June 10, 2008	August 13, 2009	December 2, 2009
20th Anniversary Complete Collection	204	May 10, 2011	N/A	N/A
The Complete Collection	204	N/A	February 1, 2016	N/A

== Post-series events ==
Tim Allen, Richard Karn, Casey Sander and Debbe Dunning had a reunion in a television special named Tim Allen Presents: A User's Guide to Home Improvement in 2003 (a terminally ill Earl Hindman did voice-overs, befitting his never-seen persona of Wilson; Hindman died shortly after the special aired). Allen presented his own favorite clips from the show, insider's tips, personal reflections and a question and answer session with the live audience.

On August 3, 2011, in Pacific Palisades, California, the surviving main cast members reunited for Entertainment Weekly magazine, including Jonathan Taylor Thomas, whom the cast had not seen since 1998.

Karn guest starred in two episodes of Tim Allen's 2010s ABC/Fox sitcom Last Man Standing in 2013. Thomas has also appeared on Last Man Standing, and has directed episodes of the series.

In 2015, Patricia Richardson guest starred on Last Man Standing in the episode "Helen Potts", playing the episode's titular character. Thomas made a cameo in the episode, playing Richardson's son.

On May 5, 2015, Hollywood Life reported that Allen and Karn had admitted talking about getting back together as a cast for a Home Improvement reboot or reunion show. Karn was quoted as saying, "There is always a chance, absolutely. Would I be on board? Yeah, I think so! I would love to see what the story lines could be, it could be very funny!"

On February 18, 2020, CinemaBlend reported that Allen wants to bring back Home Improvement for a revival:

I like the idea of doing it as a one-off, like a one-hour movie [versus a full-fledged revival series]. I like the idea of finding out where the boys are now, and where... Tool Time would be in today's world. I just think it's a marvelous idea, and all the actors think it's a great idea.

In January 2021, Allen reprised his role of Tim Taylor in an episode of Last Man Standing titled "Dual Time".

Premiering in February 2021, Tim Allen and Richard Karn, teamed up with YouTuber DIYer April Wilkerson, on History Channel unscripted competition show Assembly Required; where home handymen/makers/DIYers/inventors, compete to build souped up home tools a la Tool Time from Home Improvement, with supplied parts and pieces, and some of their own junk at home.

Premiering in June 2022, Allen and Karn again teamed up with Wilkerson on another History Channel documentary series More Power; where the hosts cover the history of tools, again a la Tool Time from Home Improvement.

In a 2024 podcast interview, Richardson debunked Allen's claims of a reunion and denied interest in one. She cited Earl Hindman's death, Zachery Ty Bryan's legal issues, and the retirement of both Taran Noah Smith and Jonathan Taylor Thomas from acting as further reasons.
