= Xian (Taoism) =

Immortal person or entity in Taoism

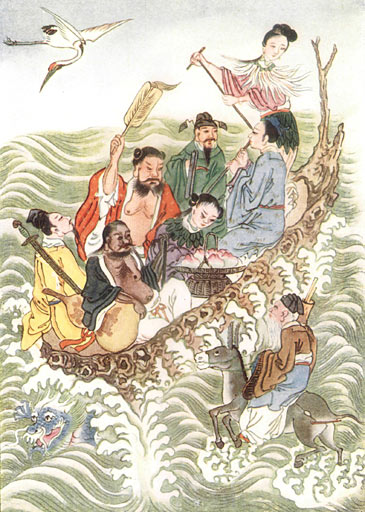
"The Eight Immortals Crossing the Sea"

A xian (traditional Chinese: 仙, 僊; simplified Chinese: 仙; pinyin: xiān; Wade–Giles: hsien) is any manner of immortal or mythical being within the Taoist pantheon or Chinese folklore. Xian has often been translated into English as 'transcendent', 'immortal', or 'wizard'.

Traditionally, xian refers to entities who have attained immortality and supernatural or magical abilities later in life, with a connection to the heavenly realms inaccessible to mortals. This is often achieved through spiritual self-cultivation, alchemy, or worship by others. This is different from the gods (deities) in Chinese mythology and Taoism.

Xian is also used as a descriptor to refer to often benevolent figures of great historical, spiritual and cultural significance. The Quanzhen School of Taoism defined xian in various ways, including a metaphorical sense meaning a good or principled person.

Xian have been venerated from ancient times to the modern day in a variety of ways across different cultures and religious sects in China.

In China, gods (deities) and xian are often mentioned together as shenxian (神仙; shénxiān).

== Description ==
Victor H. Mair describes the xian archetype as:

They are immune to heat and cold, untouched by the elements, and can fly, mounting upward with a fluttering motion. They dwell apart from the chaotic world of man, subsist on air and dew, are not anxious like ordinary people, and have the smooth skin and innocent faces of children. The transcendents live an effortless existence that is best described as spontaneous. They recall the ancient Indian ascetics and holy men known as rishi who possessed similar traits.

Xian were regarded as "personal gods" who had been human and ascended through ascetics, scholarship, or martial arts. Taoists would venerate them, and emulate their example in everyday life.

The Eight Immortals are examples of xian who became folk heroes believed to assist worthy followers and mediate between the living and the dead. Sometimes, they and other xian were viewed as similar in nature to ghosts, rather than deities. The Eight Immortals and other xian were believed to possess powers connected to their symbolic tools, which could extend or shorten human lifespans depending on their use.

Some Taoists regarded xian as inner gods of the body, capable of troubling mortals but countered through martial virtue and discipline. They were considered capable of both benevolent and malevolent actions. Not all xian originated within Taoist practice but they are most often associated with Taoist adepts who achieved immortality through spiritual cultivation.

Besides enlightened humans and fairy-like beings, xian can also refer to supernatural animals, including foxes, fox spirits, and Chinese dragons. Xiān dragons were believed to serve as mounts for Deities or as manifestations of Taoist sages such as Laozi in celestial realms sometimes called "the Heavens" (天; Tiān).

The mythological huli jing (狐狸精; húli jīng; 'fox fairy', 'vixen', 'witch', 'enchantress') is also known as huxian (狐仙; húxiān; 'fox immortal').

Akira Akahori, the author of Drug Taking and Immortality, gives this description:

Legends of so-called immortals were widely accepted by the ancient Chinese. Although the concept of immortals was not exactly the same through the ages, some general images persisted. Immortals usually live in clean and pure places such as high mountains; they do not eat cereals; they appear only to people who perform the proper religious practices or have the right kind of destiny. Some immortals also live in grottoes underneath the sacred mountains. They can freely change their appearance: sometimes they appear in the everyday world looking like ordinary men, to test young immortal aspirants. They move very swiftly and fly through the air, sometimes using wings.

== Types of xian and levels of achievement ==
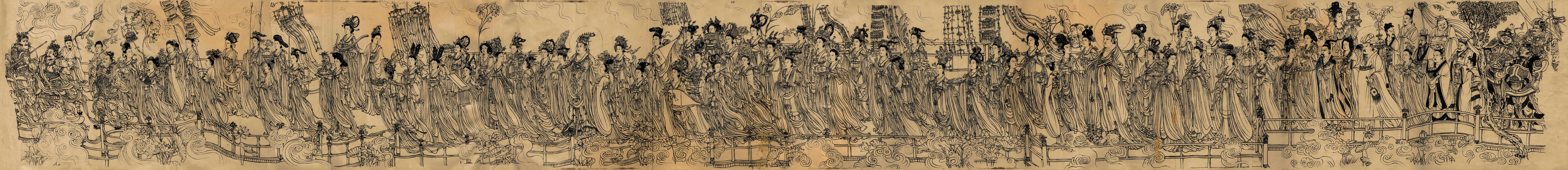
Xian as depicted on Eighty-seven Immortals (八十七神仙), popularly attributed to Tang dynasty painter Wu Daozi, currently housed in Xu Beihong Memorial Hall in Beijing.

=== Zhongli Chuandao ji ===
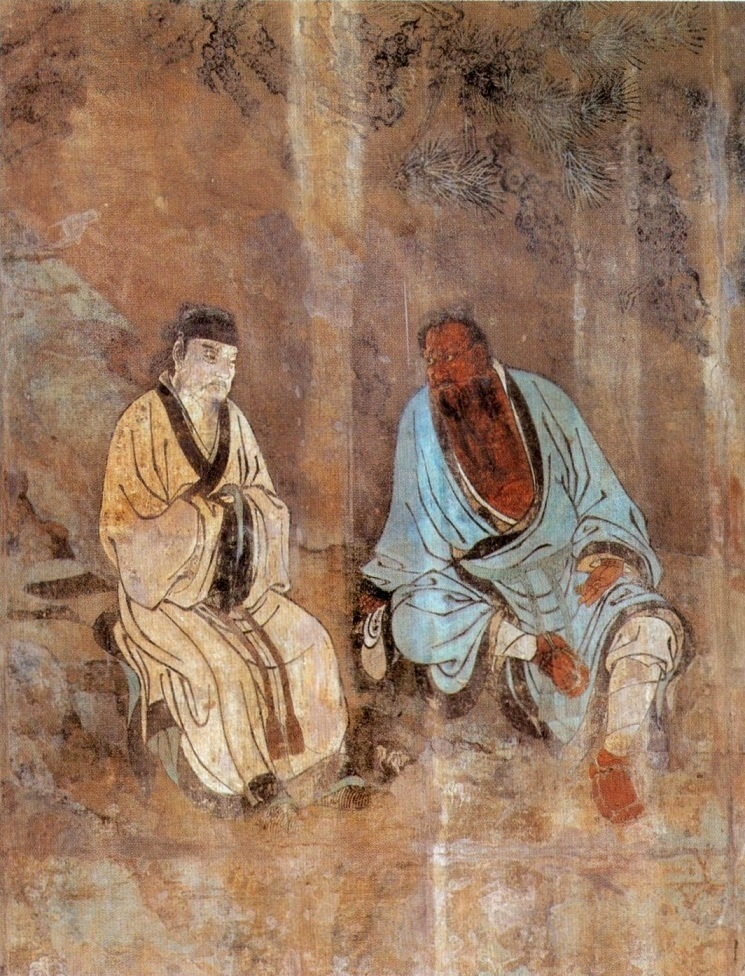
Yuan dynasty temple mural of Zhongli Quan instructing Lü Dongbin

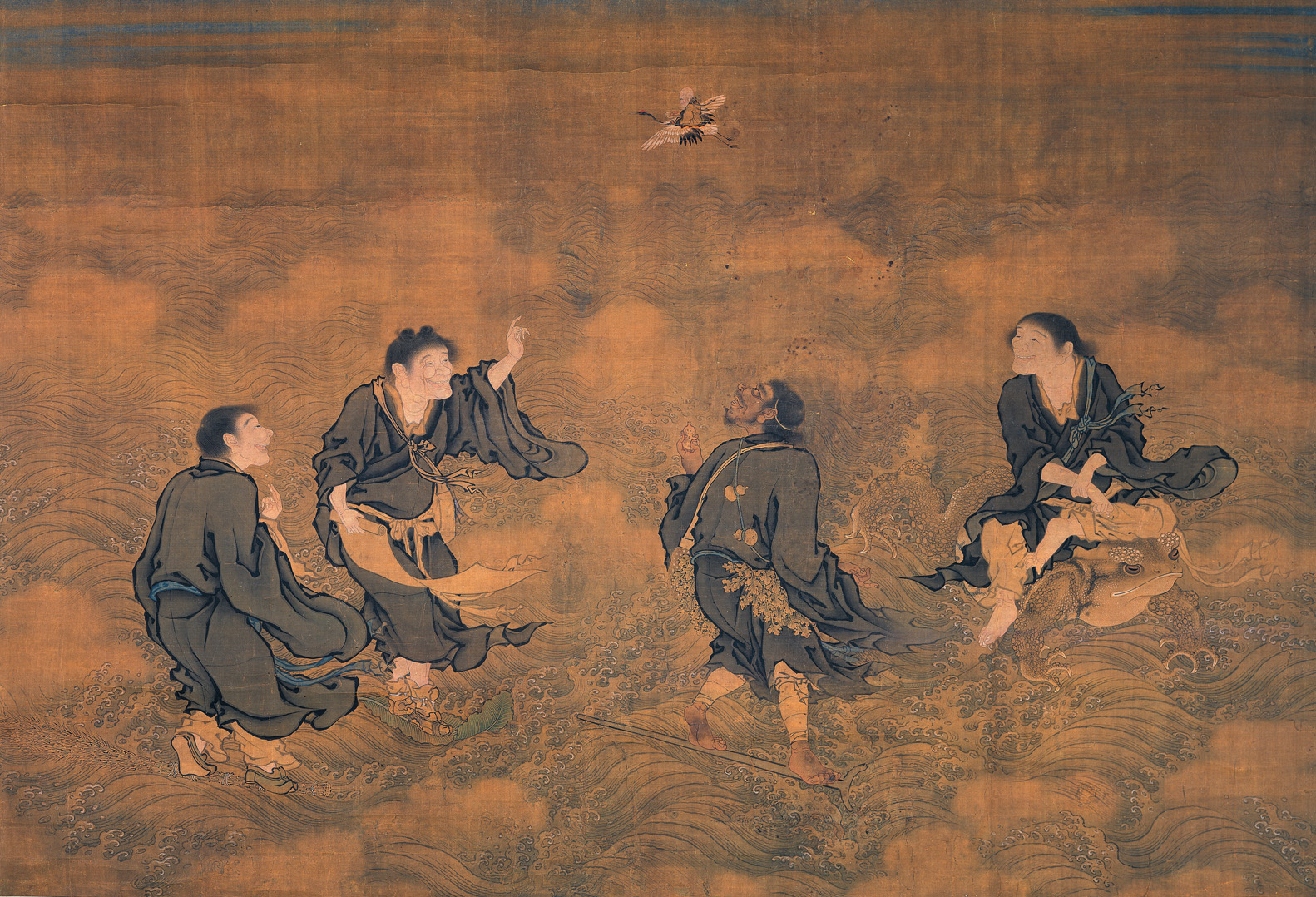
Four Immortals Saluting Longevity, by Shang Xi (商喜), early Ming dynasty (1368–1644). The immortals are from left to right: Shide, Hanshan, Iron-Crutch Li, and Liu Haichan. The longevity deity riding the crane.

The Zhōng lǚ chuándào jí (鐘呂傳道集; 'Anthology of the Transmission of the Dao from Zhong to Lü') is a Song dynasty Taoist compendium, following the Zhōng Lǚ (鍾呂) textual tradition of internal alchemy (neidan), which lists five classes of immortals:

- Guǐ xiān (鬼仙) —"Ghost Immortals": A person who cultivates too much yin energy. These immortals are likened to Vampires because they drain the life essence of the living, much like the fox spirit. Ghost immortals do not leave the realm of ghosts.
- Rén xiān (人仙) —"Human Immortals": Humans have an equal balance of yin and yang energies, so they have the potential of becoming either a ghost or immortal. Although they continue to hunger and thirst and require clothing and shelter like a normal human, these immortals do not suffer from aging or sickness. Human immortals do not leave the realm of humans. There are many sub-classes of human immortals.
- De xiān (地仙) — "Earthly Immortals": When the yin is transformed into the pure yang, a true immortal body will emerge that does not need food, drink, clothing or shelter and is not affected by hot or cold temperatures. Earth immortals do not leave the realm of earth. These immortals are forced to stay on earth until they shed their human form.
- Shénxiān (神仙) —"Spirit Immortals" also known as "Divine Immortals": The immortal body of the earthbound class will eventually change into vapor through further practice. They have supernatural powers and can take on the shape of any object. These immortals must remain on earth, acquiring merit by teaching mankind about the Tao. Spirit immortals do not leave the realm of spirits. Once enough merit is accumulated, they are called to heaven by a celestial decree.
- Tiānxiān (天仙) —"Celestial Immortals" also known as "Heavenly Immortals" : Spirit immortals who are summoned to heaven are given the minor office of water realm judge. Over time, they are promoted to oversee the earth realm and finally become administrators of the celestial realm. These immortals have the power to travel back and forth between the earthly and celestial realms.

=== Baopuzi ===
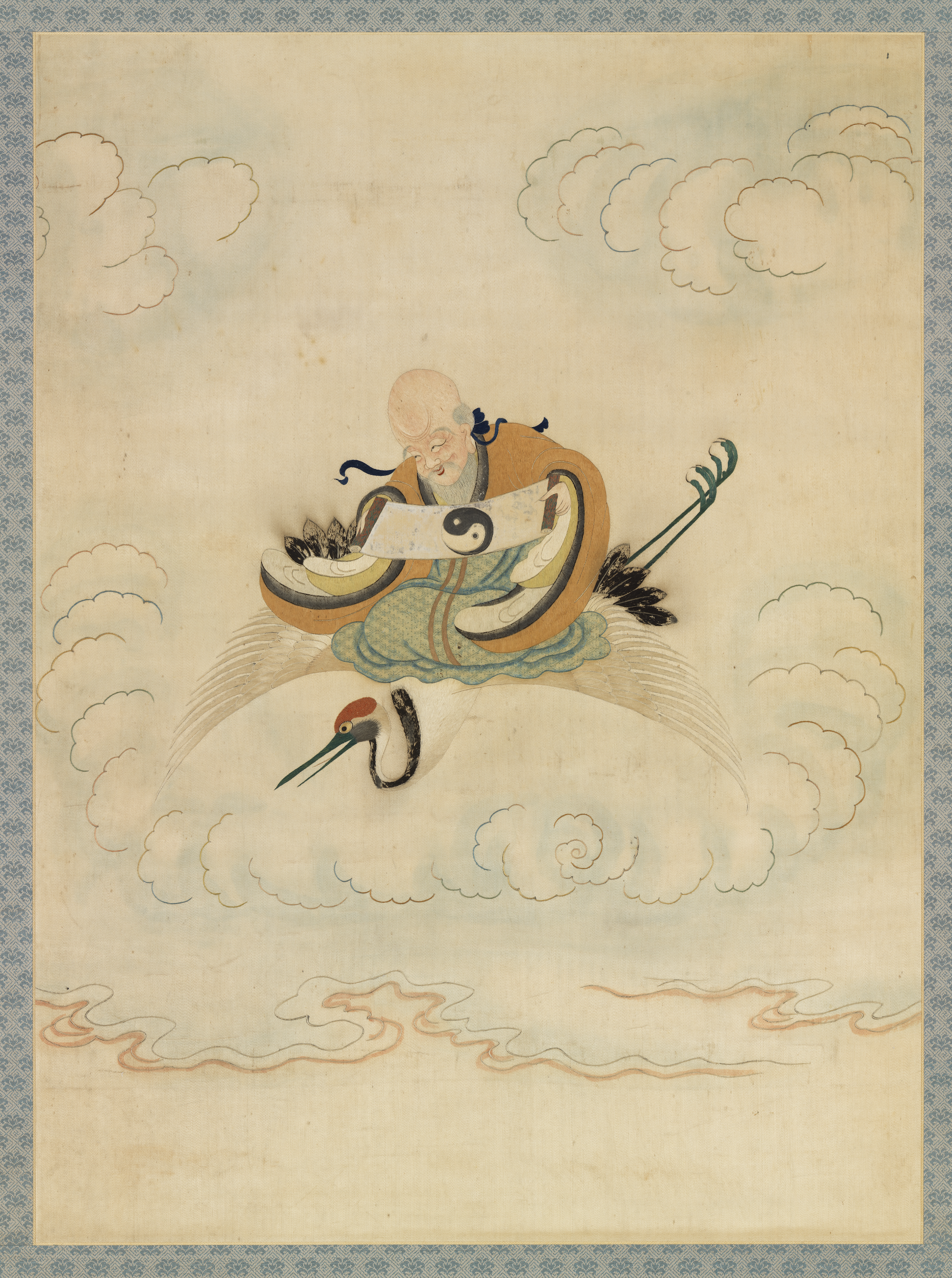
Ming dynasty painting of Old Man of the South Pole riding a crane

The 4th century CE Baopuzi (抱朴子 "[Book of] Master Embracing Simplicity"), written by Ge Hong, gives some highly detailed descriptions of xian, listing three classes:

- Tiānxiān (天仙) – "Celestial Immortals" or "Heavenly Immortals" - The highest level.
- Dì xiān (地仙) – "Earthly Immortals" - The middle level.
- Shījiě xiān (屍解仙; 'Corpse Untie Immortal') - "Escaped-by-means-of-a-stimulated-corpse-simulacrum Immortal"- The lowest level. This is considered the lowest form of immortality since a person must first "fake" their own death by substituting a bewitched object like a bamboo pole, talisman, or a shoe for their corpse. Mortals who choose this route have to protect themselves from heavenly retribution by enacting the Língbǎo tàixuán yīnshēng zhī fú (靈寳太玄隂生之符; "Numinous Treasure Talisman of the Grand Mystery for Living in Hiding").

However, this is not a true form of immortality. For each misdeed a person commits, the Director of Allotted Lifespans subtracts days and sometimes years from their allotted lifespan. This method allows a person to live out the entirety of their allotted lifespan and avoid the agents of death. But the body still has to be transformed into an immortal one, hence the phrase xiānsǐ hòutuō (先死後脱) – "The 'death' is apparent, [but] the sloughing off of the body's mortality remains to be done."

There are three levels of Shījiě immortals:

Dìxià zhǔ (地下主) – "Agents Beneath the Earth" – in charge of keeping the peace within the Chinese underworld. They are eligible for promotion to earthbound immortality after 280 years of faithful service.

Dìshàng zhǔ zhě (地上主者) – "Agents Above the Earth" – given magic talismans which prolong their lives (but not indefinitely) and allow them to heal the sick and exorcize demons and evil spirits from the earth. This level was not eligible for promotion to earthbound immortality.

Zhì dì jūn (制地君) – "Lords Who Control the Earth" – a heavenly decree ordered them to "disperse all subordinate junior demons, whether high or low [in rank], that have cause afflictions and injury owing to blows or offenses against the Motion of the Year, the Original Destiny, Great Year, the Kings of the Soil or the establishing or breaking influences of the chronograms of the tome. Annihilate them all." This level was also not eligible for promotion to immortality.

These titles were usually given to humans who had either not proven themselves worthy of or were not fated to become immortals. One such famous agent was Fei Changfang, who was eventually murdered by evil spirits because he lost his book of magic talismans. Some accounts describe immortals using this method to escape execution.

== Translations ==
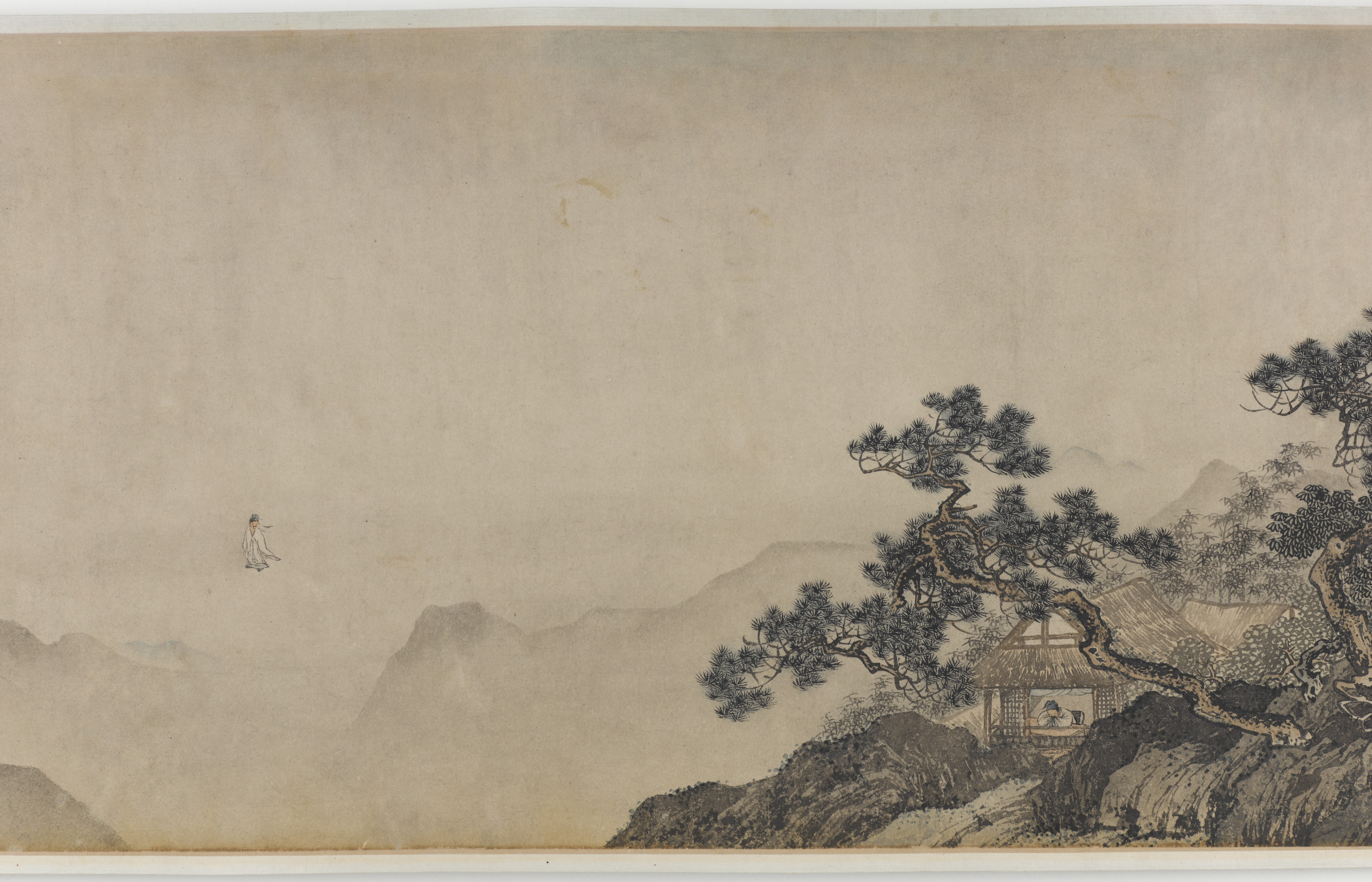
The Thatched Hut of Dreaming of an Immortal, by Tang Yin.

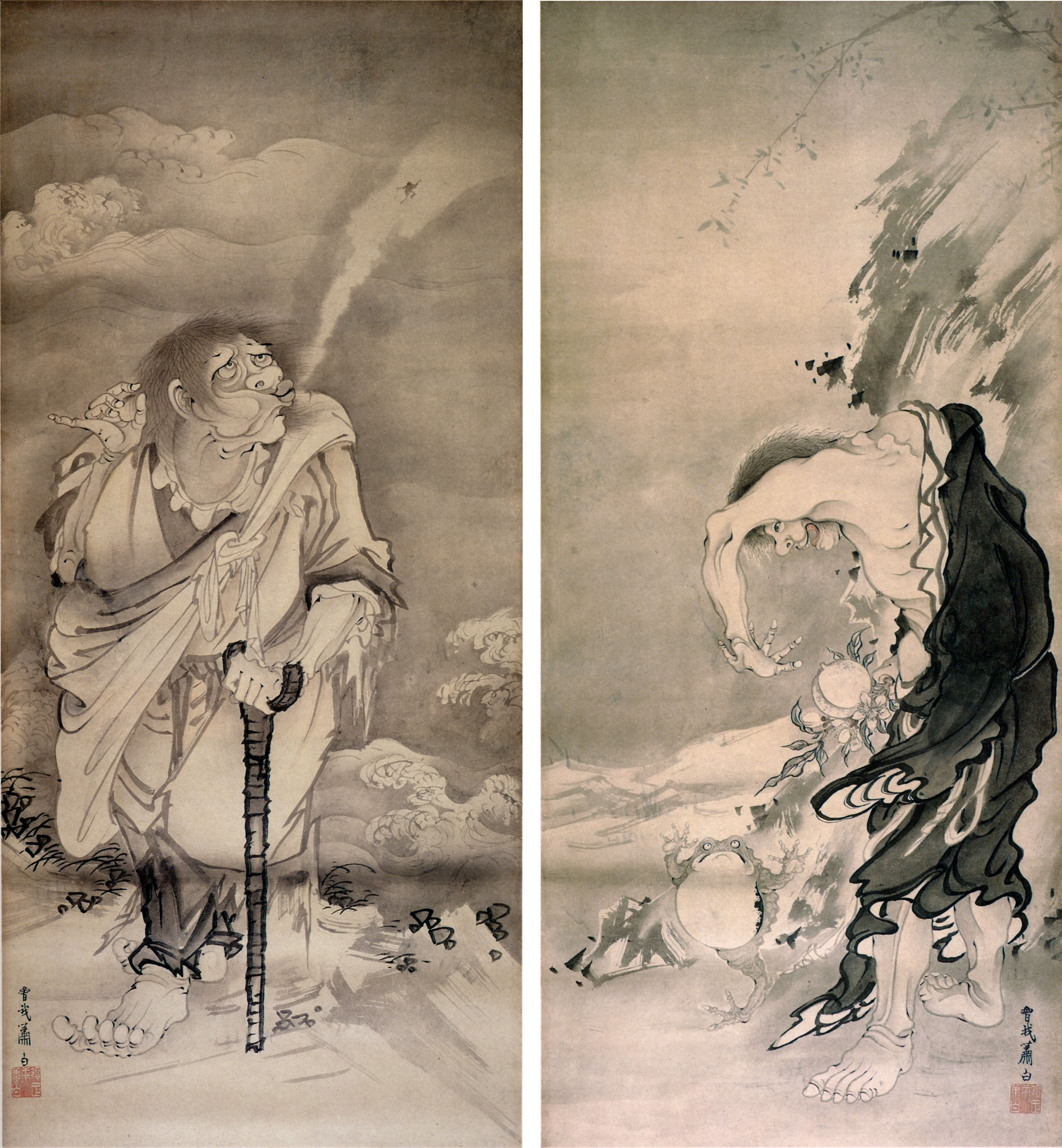
Painting of two xian, Iron-crutch Li of the Eight Immortals on the left releasing a bat and Liu Haichan on the right holding one of the Peaches of Immortality and accompanied by the three-legged toad, Jin Chan. By Soga Shōhaku (曾我蕭白), circa 1760.

The Chinese word xian is translatable into English as:

- (in Daoist philosophy and cosmology) spiritually immortal; transcendent human; celestial being
- (in Daoist religion and pantheon) physically immortal; immortal person; an immortal; saint, one who is aligned with Heaven's mandate and does not suffer earthly desires or attachments.
- (in Chinese alchemy) alchemist; one who seeks the elixir of life; one who practices longevity techniques by turning shen to jing.
  - (or by extension) alchemical, herbal, shi liao, or qigong methods for attaining immortality
- (in Chinese mythology) wizard; magician; shaman; sorcerer
- (in popular Chinese literature) genie; elf, fairy; nymph; xianjing (仙境; xiānjìng) is fairyland.
- (based on the folk etymology for the character xian [仙], a compound of the characters for person and mountain) sage living high in the mountains; mountain-man; hermit; recluse
- (as a metaphorical modifier) immortal [talent]; accomplished person; celestial [beauty]; marvelous; extraordinary
- (in new-age conception) seeker who takes refuge in immortality (longevity for the realization of divinity); transcended person [self] recoded by the "higher self"; divine soul; fully established being
- (in early Tang dynasty folk religion conception) immortal being part of a small spiritual cabal who had immortal lifespans and supernatural powers, and were enlightened to the works of heaven, which assigned everyone else to "gloomy underworld jails", "a fiery underworld", and/or a mundane role in the afterlife depending on how positively one viewed the afterlife
- (in Daoism and Chinese folk religion) a Daoist who was blessed to become immortal from death onwards and/or a guardian of a village
- (in Chinese Buddhism and Buddhist-inspired Taoist sects) a kind of deity or spiritual person imported from Taoism
- (in Confucianism within some imperial courts and folk religion practice that believes in the three teachings) an ideal existence often associated with cult images made from bronze and with "everlasting life" that is synonymous with and a part of tian or an afterlife that combines elements of Confucianism, Taoism, and Buddhism, a higher reality (variably a yin-yang realm or a mountain world beyond reality that created jade that manifests in the real world), the Tao and the forces of nature, or existence itself or a being that a deceased person's soul should become
- (in Fujian Confucianism, Buddhism, Taoism, and folk religion) a boddhisatva, a person who is on the path like Gautama Buddha or a being of comparable holiness and power over nature to one, or a type of god worshipped in temples
- (in Korean Taoist-inspired new religions) a being subservient to heaven that helps humans

== Etymology ==
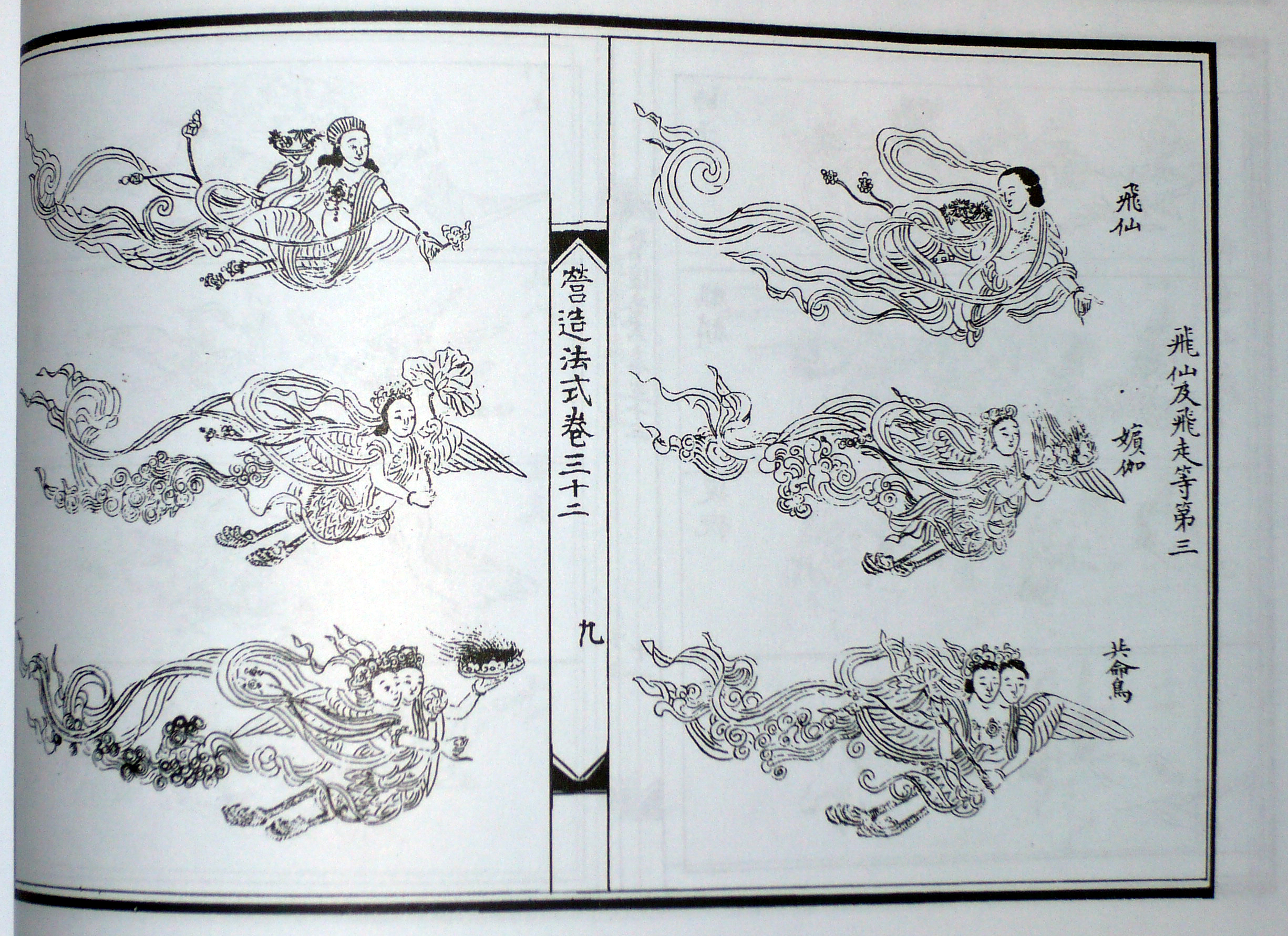
Flying xian motifs, shown on the technical treastise Yingzao Fashi.

The etymology of xian remains uncertain. The Shiming (c. 200 CE), a Chinese dictionary of wordplay etymologies, defines xiān (仙) as "to get old and not die," explained as someone who qiān (遷; 'moves into') the mountains.

Its writing is a combination of ren (人; rén; 'human') and shan (山; shān; 'mountain'). Its historical form is xian (僊; xiān) a combination of ren (人; rén; 'human') and qian (遷/䙴; qiān; 'moving into').

Xian is often used as Chinese compound, such as the Baxian (八仙; Bāxiān; 'Eight Immortals'). Other common words include xianren (仙人; xiānrén; 'immortal person', 'transcendent'), (Note: see Xianren Cave) xianrenzhang (仙人掌; xiānrénzhǎng; 'immortal's palm'; "cactus"), xiannü (xiān nǚ; 'immortal woman', 'female celestial', 'angel'), and shenxian (神仙; shénxiān; 'gods and immortals').

Edward H. Schafer defined xian as "a transcendent, sylph-like being who, through alchemical, gymnastic and other disciplines, achieved a refined and possibly immortal body, able to fly beyond the material world and subsist on air and dew." Schafer noted xian was cognate to xian (䙴; "soar up"), qian (遷; "remove"), and xianxian (僊僊; "a flapping dance movement"); and compared Chinese yuren (羽人; "feathered man; xian") with English peri "a fairy or supernatural being in Persian mythology" (Persian pari from par "feather; wing").

Two linguistic hypotheses for the etymology of xian involve Arabic and Sino-Tibetan languages. Wu and Davis suggested the source was jinn, or jinni "genie" (from Arabic جني jinnī). "The marvelous powers of the Hsien are so like those of the jinni of the Arabian Nights that one wonders whether the Arabic word, jinn, may not be derived from the Chinese Hsien." Axel Schuessler's etymological dictionary proposes a Sino-Tibetan connection between xiān (Old Chinese *san or *sen, "an immortal; men and women who attain supernatural abilities and, after death, become immortals and deities able to fly") and Classical Tibetan gšen < g-syen ("shaman, one with supernatural abilities, including flight").

=== The character and its variants ===
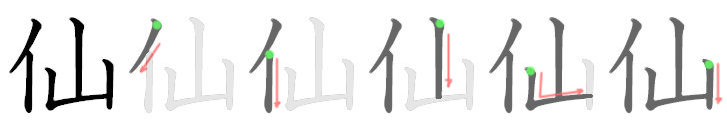
Stroke order for 仙

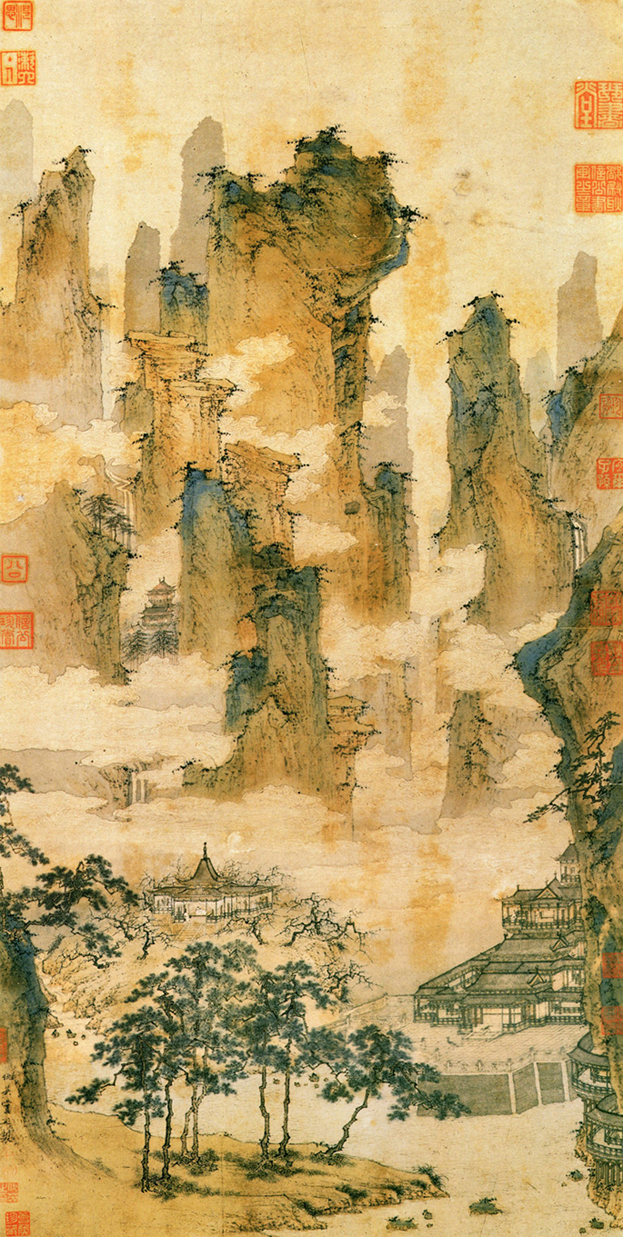
Pavilions in the Mountains of Immortals, by Qiu Ying

The word xiān is written with three characters (僊, 仙, or 仚) which combine the logographic radical ren (人/亻; "person; human") with two phonetic elements (see Chinese character classification). The oldest recorded xian character (僊) includes a qian (䙴; qiān; 'rise up', 'ascend') phonetic, reflecting the idea that immortals could "ascend into the heavens". (Compare 遷; qiān; "move; transfer; change" combining this phonetic and the motion radical.) The usual modern xiān character (仙), and its rare variant (仚), have a shān (山; "mountain") phonetic. For a character analysis, Schipper interprets "'the human being of the mountain,' or alternatively, 'human mountain'. The two explanations are appropriate to these beings: they haunt the holy mountains, while also embodying nature."

The Classic of Poetry (220/3) contains the oldest occurrence of the character xian (僊), reduplicated as xiānxiān (僊僊; "dance lightly; hop about; jump around"), and rhymed with qiān (遷). "But when they have drunk too much, Their deportment becomes light and frivolous—They leave their seats, and [遷] go elsewhere, They keep [僊僊] dancing and capering." (tr. James Legge) Needham and Wang suggest xiān was cognate with wu (巫; "shamanic dancing"). Paper writes: "The function of the term xiān in a line describing dancing may be to denote the height of the leaps. Since "to live for a long time" has no etymological relation to xiān, it may be a later accretion."

The 121 CE Shuowen Jiezi, the first important dictionary of Chinese characters, does not enter xian (仙) except in the definition for Wòquán (偓佺; "name of an ancient immortal"). It defines xian (僊) as "live long and move away" and xian (仚) as "appearance of a person on a mountaintop".

== History and textual references ==
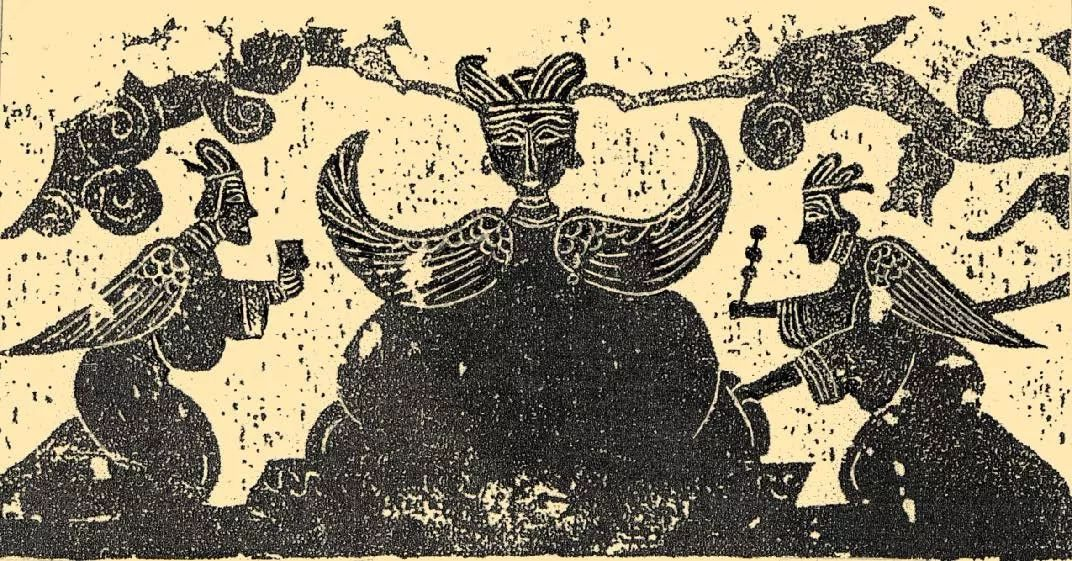
Han dynasty stone-relief of Xiwangmu, surrounded by winged or feathered Immortals, Yuren (羽人)

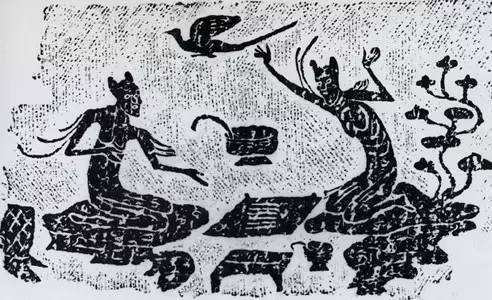
Han dynasty relief of feathered Immortals playing Liubo.

Descriptions of xian ("immortals; transcendents") in Chinese texts vary according to historical changes in Daoist views on immortality.

Early texts such as the Zhuangzi, Chuci, and Liezi used xiān and magical islands allegorically to describe spiritual immortality. They sometimes employed the term yuren (羽人; 'feathered person'; later also meaning "Daoist" (Note: Daoist ascension to immortality is also called "羽化登升" or "Becoming feather and ascending")) and associated immortals with motifs of feathers and flight, such as yuhua (羽化; yǔhuà), with "feather; wing".

Later texts such as the Shenxian Zhuan and Baopuzi treated immortality literally, describing esoteric alchemical practices aimed at physical longevity. Neidan ("internal alchemy") included taixi ("embryonic respiration"), breath control, meditation, visualization, sexual training and daoyin exercises (later evolving into qigong and tai chi). Waidan ("external alchemy") emphasized recipes involving magical plants, rare minerals, herbal medicines, drugs and dietary regimens such as inedia.

Besides the following major Chinese texts, many others use both graphic variants of xiān. Xian (仙) occurs in the Chunqiu Fanlu, Fengsu Tongyi, Qian fu lun, Fayan, and Shenjian; xiān (僊) occurs in the Caizhong langji, Fengsu Tongyi, Guanzi, and Shenjian.

They are most commonly found in Daoist texts, although some Buddhist sources also mention them. Chinese folk religion likewise includes such figures, for example in Northeast China with the fox gods, or huxian, that are common in the region.

The Three Sovereigns had similarities to xiān because of some of their supernatural abilities and could have been considered such. Upon his death, the Yellow Emperor was "said to have become" a xiān.

During the Six Dynasties, xiān were a common subject of zhiguai stories. They often had "magical" Tao powers including the abilities to "walk ... through walls or stand ... in light without casting a shadow."

=== Zhuangzi ===
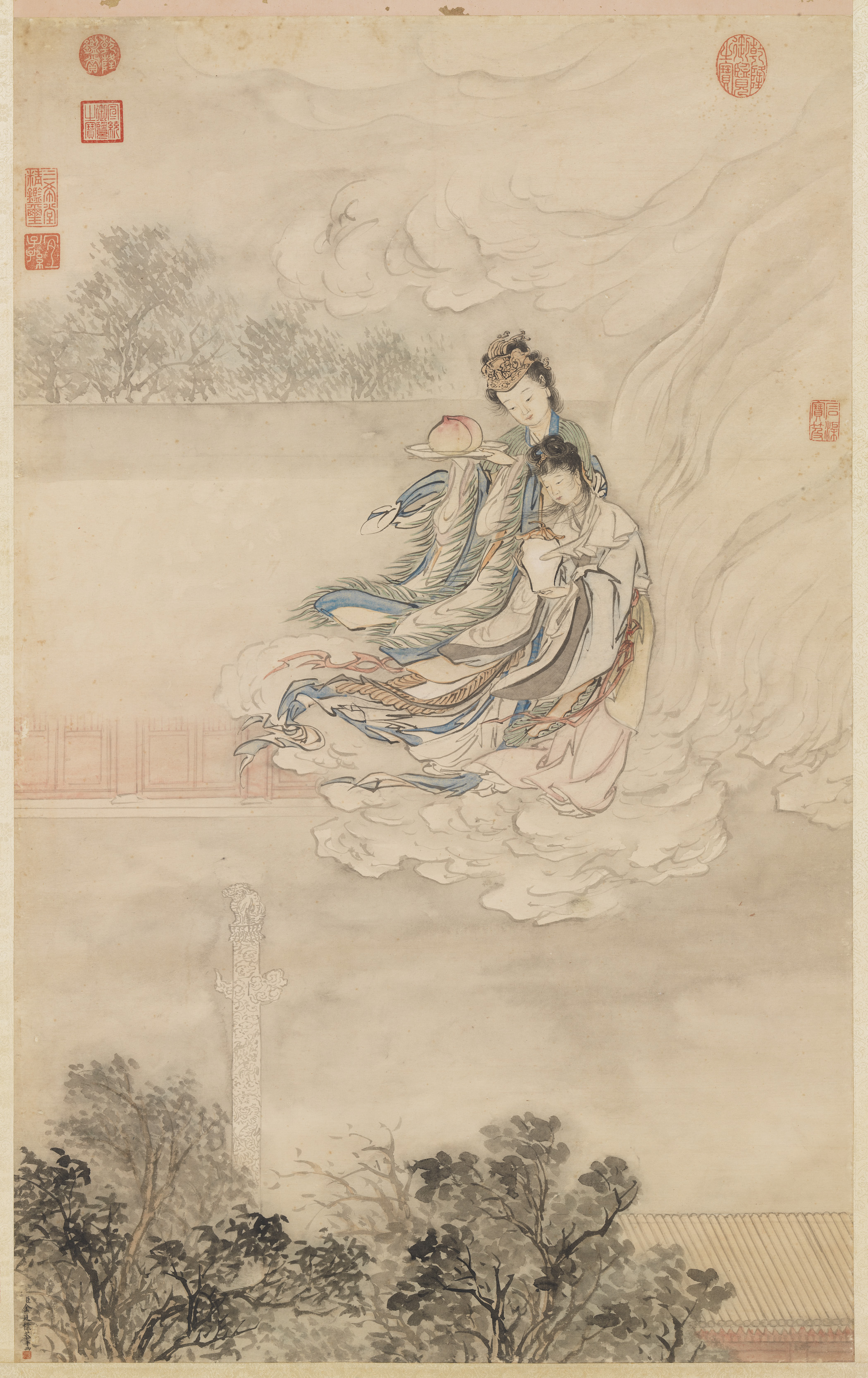
Xiwangmu descends from heavens with a Peach of Immortality (Jade Pond Birthday greeting, by Jin Tingbiao, Qing dynasty

Two circa 3rd century BCE "Outer Chapters" of the Zhuangzi ("[Book of] Master Zhuang") use the archaic character xian (僊). Chapter 11 has a parable about "Cloud Chief" (雲將; Yún jiàng) and "Big Concealment" (鴻濛; Hóngméng) that uses the Shijing compound xianxian ("dance; jump"):

Big Concealment said, "If you confuse the constant strands of Heaven and violate the true form of things, then Dark Heaven will reach no fulfillment. Instead, the beasts will scatter from their herds, the birds will cry all night, disaster will come to the grass and trees, misfortune will reach even to the insects. Ah, this is the fault of men who 'govern'!"
"Then what should I do?" said Cloud Chief.
"Ah," said Big Concealment, "you are too far gone! [僊僊; Xiān xiān] Up, up, stir yourself and be off!"
Cloud Chief said, "Heavenly Master, it has been hard indeed for me to meet with you—I beg one word of instruction!"
"Well, then—mind‑nourishment!" said Big Concealment. "You have only to rest in inaction and things will transform themselves. Smash your form and body, spit out hearing and eyesight, forget you are a thing among other things, and you may join in great unity with the deep and boundless. Undo the mind, slough off spirit, be blank and soulless, and the ten thousand things one by one will return to the root—return to the root and not know why. Dark and undifferentiated chaos—to the end of life none will depart from it. But if you try to know it, you have already departed from it. Do not ask what its name is, do not try to observe its form. "Things will naturally end of themselves."
Cloud Chief said, "The Heavenly Master has favored me with this Virtue, instructed me in this Silence. All my life I have been looking for it, and now at last I have it!" He bowed his head twice, stood up, took his leave, and went away. (11)

Chapter 12 uses xian in a passage where the mythical Emperor Yao Yao describes a shengren (圣人; 聖人; shèngrén; 'sagely person').

The true sage is a quail at rest, a little fledgling at its meal, a bird in flight who leaves no trail behind. When the world has the Way, he joins in the chorus with all other things. When the world is without the Way, he nurses his Virtue and retires in leisure. And after a thousand years, should he weary of the world, he will leave it and [上] ascend to [僊] the immortals, riding on those white clouds all the way up to the village of God. (12)

Although not using the term xian, several passages in the Zhuangzi employ imagery associated with immortals, such as flying in the clouds. For example, Chapter 1 of the "Inner Chapters," composed around the 3rd century BCE, presents two portrayals. The first is this description of Liezi:

Lieh Tzu could ride the wind and go soaring around with cool and breezy skill, but after fifteen days he came back to earth. As far as the search for good fortune went, he didn't fret and worry. He escaped the trouble of walking, but he still had to depend on something to get around. If he had only mounted on the truth of Heaven and Earth, ridden the changes of the six breaths, and thus wandered through the boundless, then what would he have had to depend on? Therefore, I say, the Perfect Man has no self; the Holy Man has no merit; the Sage has no fame. (1)

The second is a description of a shenren (神人; 'divine person').

He said that there is a Holy Man living on faraway [姑射] Ku-she Mountain, with skin like ice or snow, and gentle and shy like a young girl. He doesn't eat the five grains, but sucks the wind, drinks the dew, climbs up on the clouds and mist, rides a flying dragon, and wanders beyond the Four Seas. By concentrating his spirit, he can protect creatures from sickness and plague and make the harvest plentiful. (1)

The authors of the Zhuangzi had a lyrical view of life and death, seeing them as complementary aspects of natural changes. This is antithetical to the physical immortality (長生不老; chángshēng bùlǎo; "live forever and never age") sought by later Daoist alchemists. One well-known passage illustrates this attitude toward accepting death:)

Chuang Tzu's wife died. When Hui Tzu went to convey his condolences, he found Chuang Tzu sitting with his legs sprawled out, pounding on a tub and singing. "You lived with her, she brought up your children and grew old," said Hui Tzu. "It should be enough simply not to weep at her death. But pounding on a tub and singing—this is going too far, isn't it?" Chuang Tzu said, "You're wrong. When she first died, do you think I didn't grieve like anyone else? But I looked back to her beginning and the time before she was born. Not only the time before she was born, but the time before she had a body. Not only the time before she had a body, but the time before she had a spirit. In the midst of the jumble of wonder and mystery a change took place and she had a spirit. Another change and she had a body. Another change and she was born. Now there's been another change and she's dead. It's just like the progression of the four seasons, spring, summer, fall, winter."
"Now she's going to lie down peacefully in a vast room. If I were to follow after her bawling and sobbing, it would show that I don't understand anything about fate. So I stopped. (18)

Alan Fox offers the following interpretation of this anecdote about Zhuangzi's wife:

Many conclusions can be reached on the basis of this story, but it seems that death is regarded as a natural part of the ebb and flow of transformations which constitute the movement of Dao. To grieve over death, or to fear one's own death, for that matter, is to arbitrarily evaluate what is inevitable. This interpretation is somewhat ironic, since much of the later Daoist tradition sought longevity and immortality, drawing several of its models from the Zhuangzi.

=== Chuci ===
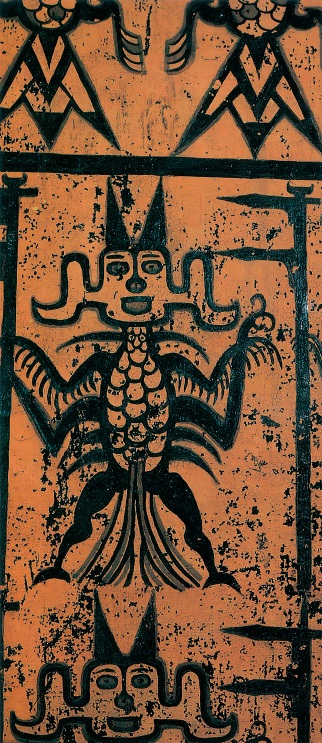
Winged guardian spirit on the side of lacquer coffin in the Tomb of Marquis Yi of Zeng, Eastern Zhou dynasty

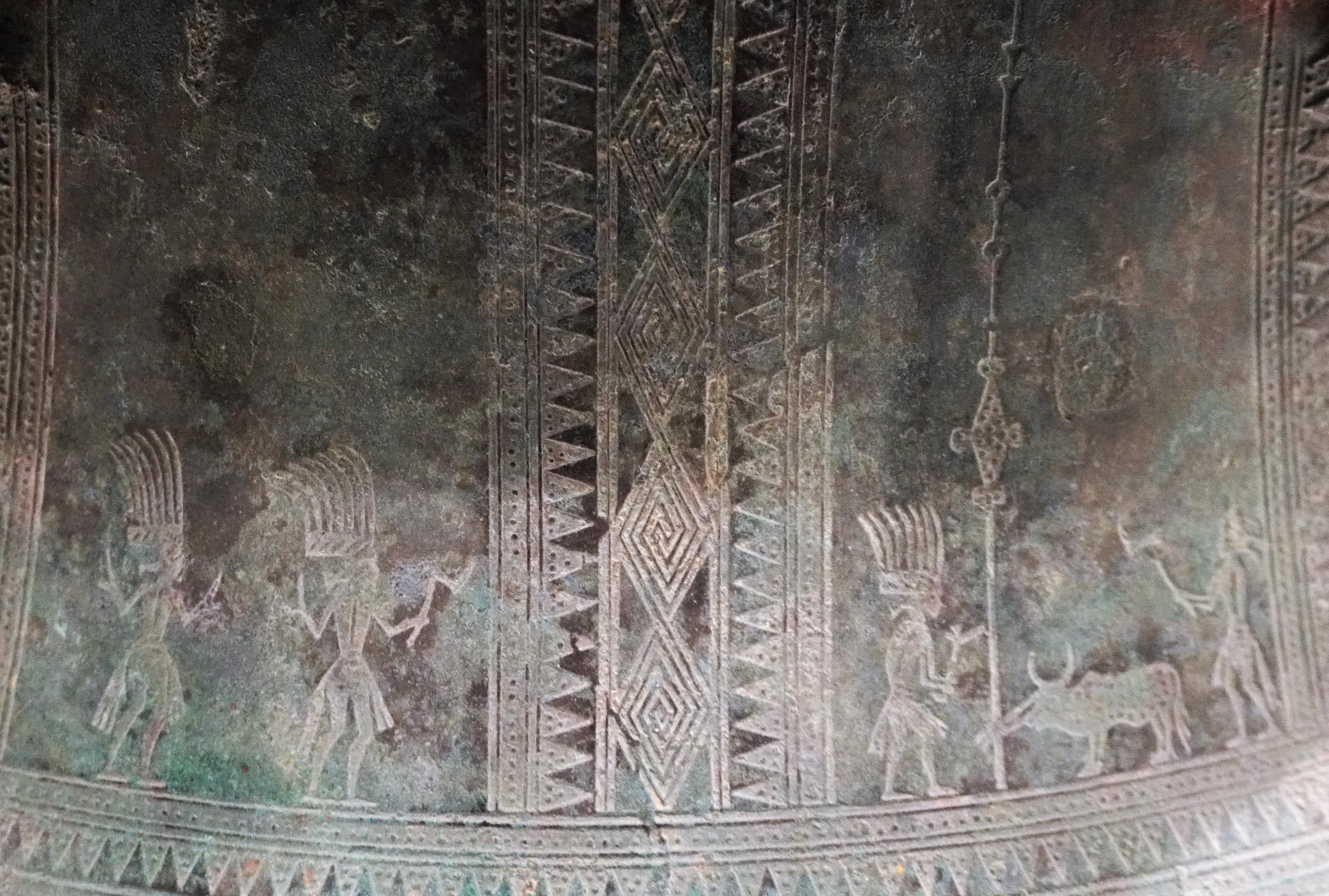
Yuren (羽人)) found on the bronze-drum from Shizhai mountain

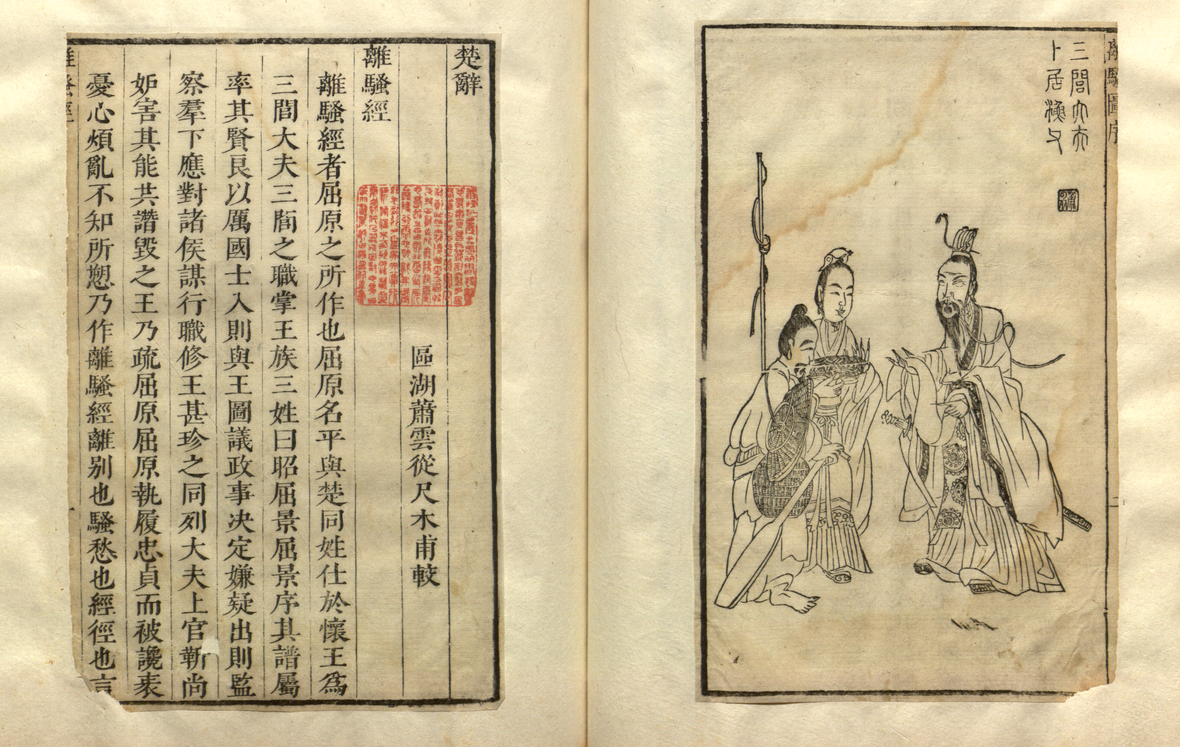
Two pages from "Li sao" from a 1645 illustrated copy of the Chuci

The 3rd–2nd century BCE Chuci; "Lyrics of Chu" anthology of poems uses xian (仙) once and xian (僊) twice, reflecting the disparate origins of the text. These three contexts mention the legendary Daoist xian immortals Chi Song (赤松; Chìsòng; "Red Pine"), and Wang Qiao (王僑) or Zi Qiao (子僑). In later Daoist hagiography, Chi Song was described as Lord of Rain under Shennong, the legendary inventor of agriculture. Wang Qiao, a son of King Ling of Zhou (r. 571–545 BCE), was said to have flown away on a giant white bird, becoming an immortal who was never seen again.

==== Yuan You ====
The "Yuan You" ("Far-off Journey") poem describes a spiritual journey into the realms of gods and immortals, frequently referring to Daoist myths and techniques.

My spirit darted forth and did not return to me,
And my body, left tenantless, grew withered and lifeless.
Then I looked into myself to strengthen my resolution,
And sought to learn from where the primal spirit issues.
In emptiness and silence I found serenity;
In tranquil inaction I gained true satisfaction.
I heard how once Red Pine had washed the world's dust off:
I would model myself on the pattern he had left me.
I honoured the wondrous powers of the [真人] Pure Ones,
And those of past ages who had become [仙] Immortals.
They departed in the flux of change and vanished from men's sight,
Leaving a famous name that endures after them.

==== Xi shi ====
The "Xi shi" ("Sorrow for Troth Betrayed") resembles the "Yuan You", and both reflect Daoist ideas from the Han period. "Though unoriginal in theme," says Hawkes, "its description of air travel, written in a pre-aeroplane age, is exhilarating and rather impressive."

We gazed down of the Middle Land [China] with its myriad people
As we rested on the whirlwind, drifting about at random.
In this way we came at last to the moor of Shao-yuan:
There, with the other blessed ones, were Red Pine and Wang Qiao.
The two Masters held zithers tuned in perfect concord:
I sang the Qing Shang air to their playing.
In tranquil calm and quiet enjoyment,
Gently I floated, inhaling all the essences.
But then I thought that this immortal life of [僊] the blessed,
Was not worth the sacrifice of my home-returning.

==== Ai shi ming ====
The “Ai shi ming” ("Alas That My Lot Was Not Cast") describes a celestial journey similar to the previous two.

Far and forlorn, with no hope of return:
Sadly I gaze in the distance, over the empty plain.
Below, I fish in the valley streamlet;
Above, I seek out [僊] holy hermits.
I enter into friendship with Red Pine;
I join Wang Qiao as his companion. We send the Xiao Yang in front to guide us;
The White Tiger runs back and forth in attendance.
Floating on the cloud and mist, we enter the dim height of heaven;
Riding on the white deer we sport and take our pleasure.

==== Li Sao ====
The "Li Sao" ("On Encountering Trouble"), the most famous Chuci poem, is usually interpreted as describing ecstatic flights and trance techniques of Chinese shamans. The above three poems are variations describing Daoist xian.

Some other Chuci poems refer to immortals with synonyms of xian. For instance, Shou zhi (守志; "Maintaining Resolution") uses zhenren (真人; 'true person') translated to Pure Ones above in "Yuan You", which Wang Yi's commentary glosses as zhen xianren (真仙人; "true immortal person")

I visited Fu Yue, bestriding a dragon,
Joined in marriage with the Weaving Maiden,
Lifted up Heaven's Net to capture evil,
Drew the Bow of Heaven to shoot at wickedness,
Followed the [真人[ Immortals fluttering through the sky,
Ate of the Primal Essence to prolong my life.

=== Han dynasty xian texts ===
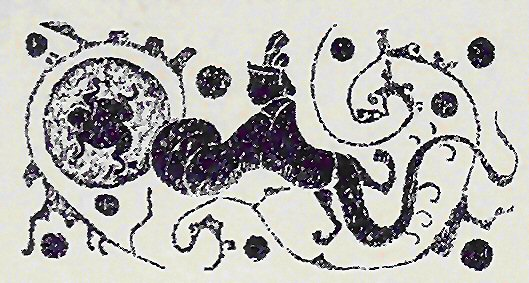
Han dynasty pictorial brick of Chang'e

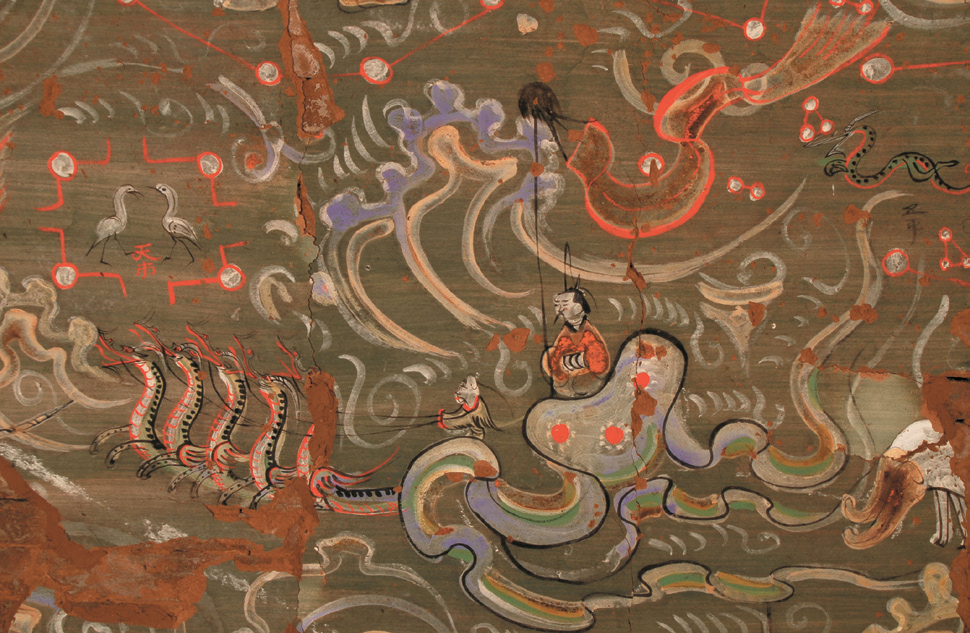
Mural showing heavenly beings riding on chariot driven by dragons, of a tomb of the Xin dynasty in Jingbian County, Shaanxi.

In at least the latter two centuries of the Han dynasty, the idea of becoming a xian received more popularity than in previous eras of Chinese religion.

In ancient Chinese dynasties such as the Han, various gods were thought to be xian instead in some retellings of their mythology. Hou Yi was one example of this.

=== Liezi ===
The Liezi ("[Book of] Master Lie"), which Louis Komjathy suggests was compiled in the 3rd century CE (though it contains earlier material), uses xian four times, always in the compound xiansheng (仙圣; 仙聖; xiānshèng; 'immortal sage').

Nearly half of Chapter 2 ("The Yellow Emperor") comes from the Zhuangzi, including this recounting of the above fable about Mount Gushe (姑射, or Guye, or Miao Gushe 藐姑射).

The Ku-ye mountains stand on a chain of islands where the Yellow River enters the sea. Upon the mountains there lives a Divine Man, who inhales the wind and drinks the dew, and does not eat the five grains. His mind is like a bottomless spring, his body is like a virgin's. He knows neither intimacy nor love, yet [仙聖] immortals and sages serve him as ministers. He inspires no awe, he is never angry, yet the eager and diligent act as his messengers. He is without kindness and bounty, but others have enough by themselves; he does not store and save, but he himself never lacks. The Yin and Yang are always in tune, the sun and moon always shine, the four seasons are always regular, wind and rain are always temperate, breeding is always timely, the harvest is always rich, and there are no plagues to ravage the land, no early deaths to afflict men, animals have no diseases, and ghosts have no uncanny echoes.

Chapter 5 uses xiansheng three times in a conversation set between the legendary rulers Tang of the Shang dynasty and Ji (革) of the Xia dynasty.

T'ang asked again: 'Are there large things and small, long and short, similar and different?'
—'To the East of the Gulf of Chih-li, who knows how many thousands and millions of miles, there is a deep ravine, a valley truly without bottom; and its bottomless underneath is named "The Entry to the Void". The waters of the eight corners and the nine regions, the stream of the Milky Way, all pour into it, but it neither shrinks nor grows. Within it there are five mountains, called Tai-yü, Yüan-chiao, Fang-hu, Ying-chou and P'eng-Iai. These mountains are thirty thousand miles high, and as many miles round; the tablelands on their summits extend for nine thousand miles. It is seventy thousand miles from one mountain to the next, but they are considered close neighbours. The towers and terraces upon them are all gold and jade, the beasts and birds are all unsullied white; trees of pearl and garnet always grow densely, flowering and bearing fruit which is always luscious, and those who eat of it never grow old and die. The men who dwell there are all of the race of [仙聖] immortal sages, who fly, too many to be counted, to and from one mountain to another in a day and a night. Yet the bases of the five mountains used to rest on nothing; they were always rising and falling, going and returning, with the ebb and flow of the tide, and never for a moment stood firm. The [仙聖] immortals found this troublesome, and complained about it to God. God was afraid that they would drift to the far West and he would lose the home of his sages. So he commanded Yü-ch'iang to make fifteen [鼇] giant turtles carry the five mountains on their lifted heads, taking turns in three watches, each sixty thousand years long; and for the first time the mountains stood firm and did not move.
'But there was a giant from the kingdom of the Dragon Earl, who came to the place of the five mountains in no more than a few strides. In one throw he hooked six of the turtles in a bunch, hurried back to his country carrying them together on his back, and scorched their bones to tell fortunes by the cracks. Thereupon two of the mountains, Tai-yü and Yüan-chiao, drifted to the far North and sank in the great sea; the [仙聖] immortals who were carried away numbered many millions. God was very angry, and reduced by degrees the size of the Dragon Earl's kingdom and the height of his subjects. At the time of Fu-hsi and Shen-nung, the people of this country were still several hundred feet high.'

Penglai Mountain became the most famous of these five mythical peaks where the elixir of life supposedly grew, and is known as Horai in Japanese legends. The first emperor Qin Shi Huang sent his court alchemist Xu Fu on expeditions to find these plants of immortality. He never returned, although some accounts claim he discovered Japan.

Holmes Welch analyzed the beginnings of Daoism, sometime around the 4th–3rd centuries BCE, from four separate streams: philosophical Daoism (Laozi, Zhuangzi, Liezi), a "hygiene school" that cultivated longevity through breathing exercises and yoga, Chinese alchemy and Five Elements philosophy, and those who sought Penglai and elixirs of "immortality". This is what he concludes about xian.

It is my own opinion, therefore, that though the word hsien, or Immortal, is used by Chuang Tzu and Lieh Tzu, and though they attributed to their idealized individual the magic powers that were attributed to the hsien in later times, nonetheless the hsien ideal was something they did not believe in—either that it was possible or that it was good. The magic powers are allegories and hyperboles for the natural powers that come from identification with Tao. Spiritualized Man, P'eng-lai, and the rest are features of a genre which is meant to entertain, disturb, and exalt us, not to be taken as literal hagiography. Then and later, the philosophical Taoists were distinguished from all other schools of Taoism by their rejection of the pursuit of immortality. As we shall see, their books came to be adopted as scriptural authority by those who did practice magic and seek to become immortal. But it was their misunderstanding of philosophical Taoism that was the reason they adopted it.

=== Shenxian zhuan ===
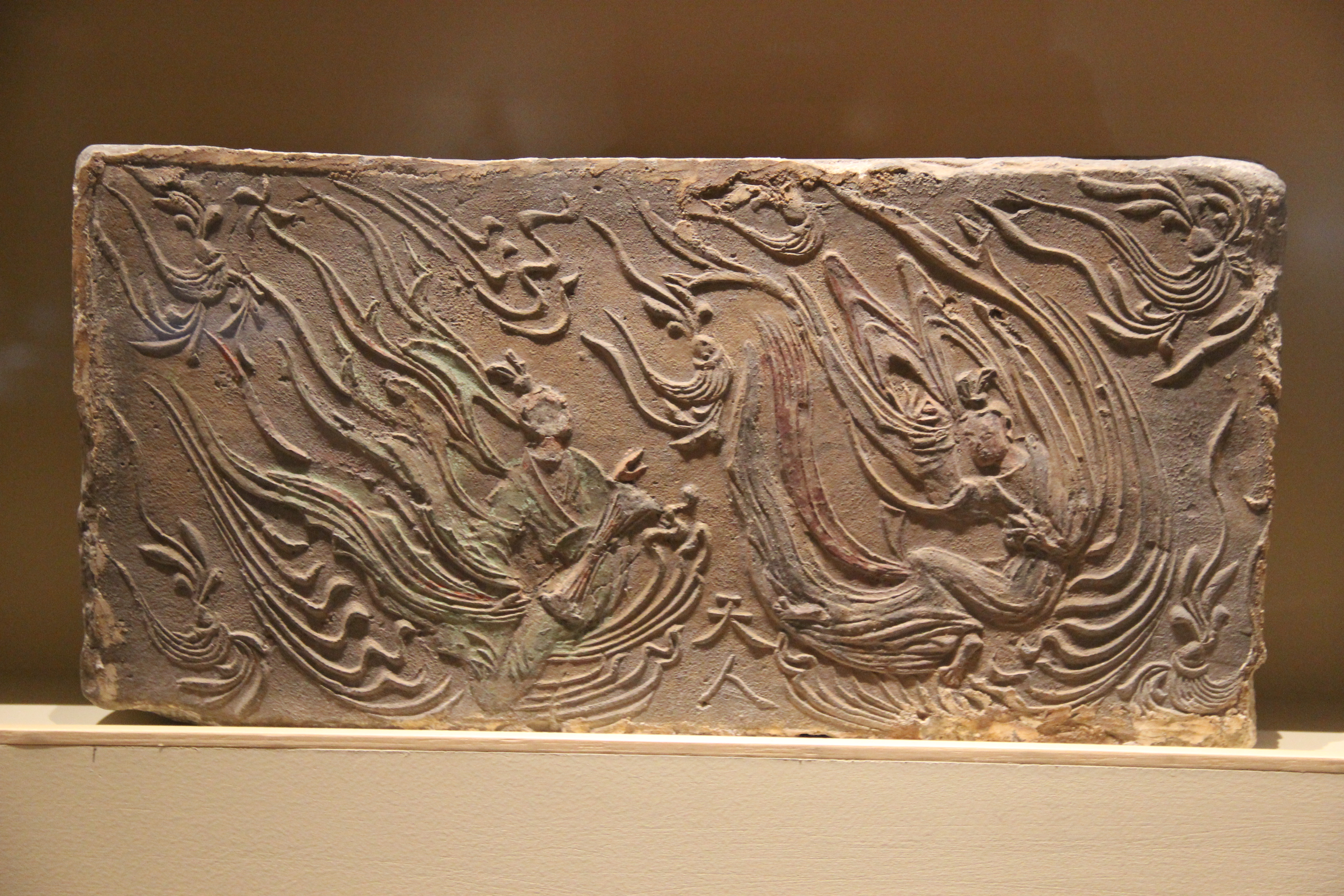
Flying immortals on Liu Song dynasty stone-relief

The Shenxian zhuan (神仙傳; "Biographies of Spirit Immortals") is a hagiography of xian. Although it was traditionally attributed to Ge Hong (283–343 CE), Komjathy says, "The received versions of the text contain some 100-odd hagiographies, most of which date from 6th–8th centuries at the earliest."

According to the Shenxian zhuan, there are four schools of immortality:

Qi (气; 'breath', 'air'; "energy"): Breath control and meditation. Practitioners of this school were believed to be able to:

"...blow on water and it will flow against its own current for several paces; blow on fire, and it will be extinguished; blow at tigers or wolves, and they will crouch down and not be able to move; blow at serpents, and they will coil up and be unable to flee. If someone is wounded by a weapon, blow on the wound, and the bleeding will stop. If you hear of someone who has suffered a poisonous insect bite, even if you are not in his presence, you can, from a distance, blow and say in incantation over your own hand (males on the left hand, females on the right), and the person will at once be healed even if more than a hundred li away. And if you yourself are struck by a sudden illness, you have merely to swallow pneumas in three series of nine, and you will immediately recover.
But the most essential thing [among such arts] is fetal breathing. Those who obtain [the technique of] fetal breathing become able to breathe without using their nose or mouth, as if in the womb, and this is the culmination of the way [of pneumatic cultivation]."

Fàn (饭; 飯; "diet"): The ingestion of herbal compounds and abstention from the Sān Shī Fàn (三尸饭; 三屍飯; 'Three-Corpses food'), which included meats (raw fish, pork, dog), leeks, scallions and grains.

"During the reign of Emperor Cheng of the Han, hunters in the Zhongnan Mountains saw a person who wore no clothes, his body covered with black hair. Upon seeing this person, the hunters wanted to pursue and capture him, but the person leapt over gullies and valleys as if in flight, and so could not be overtaken. [But after being surrounded and captured, it was discovered this person was a 200 plus year old woman, who had once been a concubine of Qin Emperor Ziying. When he had surrendered to the 'invaders of the east', she fled into the mountains where she learned to subside on 'the resin and nuts of pines' from an old man. Afterwards, this diet 'enabled [her] to feel neither hunger nor thirst; in winter [she] was not cold, in summer [she] was not hot.']
The hunters took the woman back in. They offered her grain to eat. When she first smelled the stink of grain, she vomited, and only after several days could she tolerate it. After little more than two years of this [diet], her body hair fell out; she turned old and died. Had she not been caught by men, she would have become a transcendent."

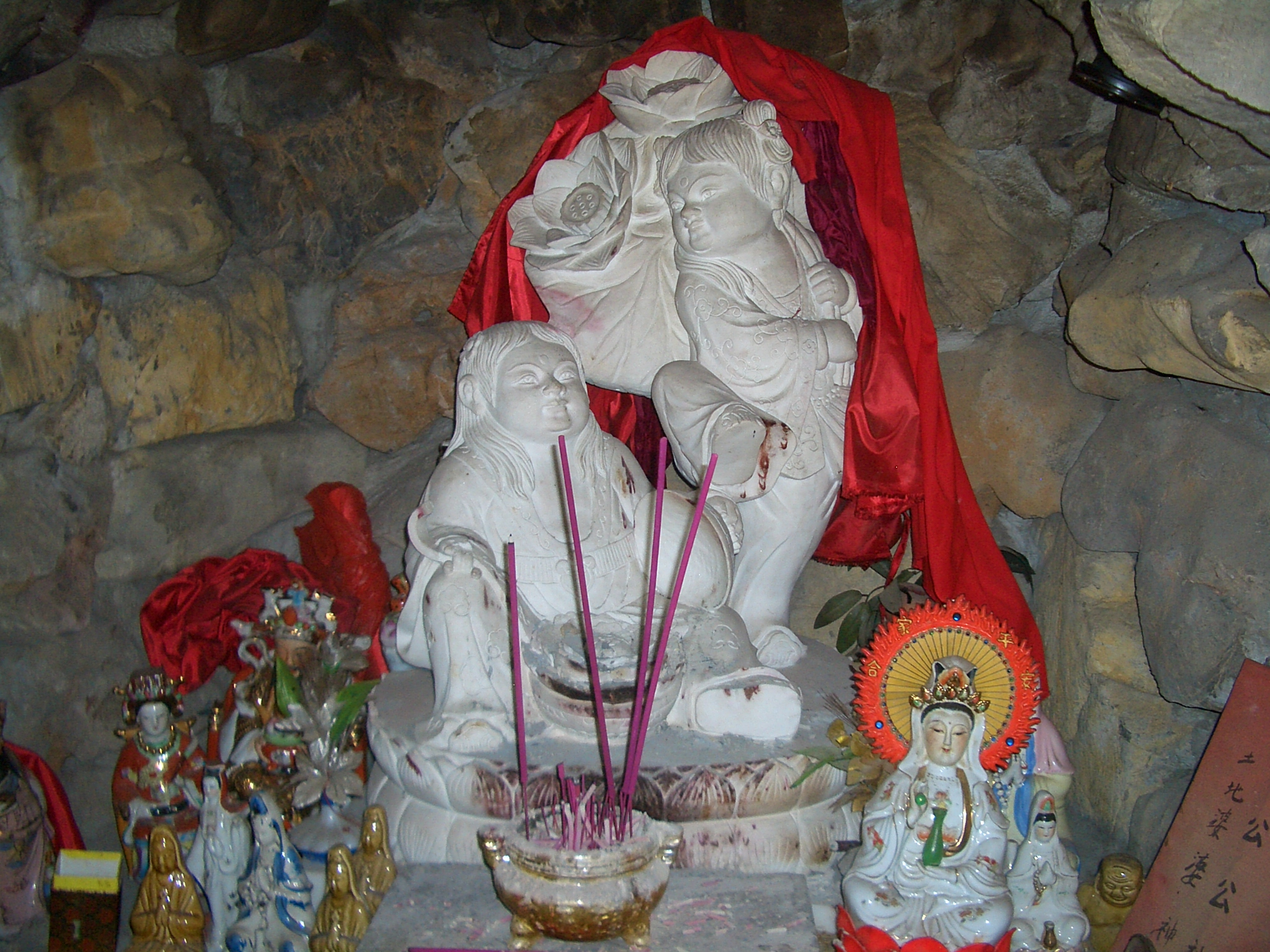
Hé and Hé (和 合), the two "Immortals of Harmony and Unity", associated with happy marriage, depicted in Changchun Temple, a Taoist temple in Wuhan

Fángzhōng Zhī Shù (房中之术; 房中之術; "Arts of the Bedchamber"): Sexual yoga. According to a discourse between the Yellow Emperor and the immortaless Sùnǚ (素女; "Plain Girl"), one of the three daughters of Hsi Wang Mu,

"The sexual behaviors between a man and woman are identical to how the universe itself came into creation. Like Heaven and Earth, the male and female share a parallel relationship in attaining an immortal existence. They both must learn how to engage and develop their natural sexual instincts and behaviors; otherwise the only result is decay and traumatic discord of their physical lives. However, if they engage in the utmost joys of sensuality and apply the principles of yin and yang to their sexual activity, their health, vigor, and joy of love will bear them the fruits of longevity and immortality.

The White Tigress Manual, a treatise on female sexual yoga, states:

"A female can completely restore her youthfulness and attain immortality if she refrains from allowing just one or two men in her life from stealing and destroying her [sexual] essence, which will only serve in aging her at a rapid rate and bring about an early death. However, if she can acquire the sexual essence of a thousand males through absorption, she will acquire the great benefits of youthfulness and immortality."

Ge Hong wrote in his book The Master Who Embraces Simplicity,

The immortals Dark Girl and Plain Girl compared sexual activity as the intermingling of fire [yang/male] and water [yin/female], claiming that water and fire can kill people but can also regenerate their life, depending on whether or not they know the correct methods of sexual activity according to their nature. These arts are based on the theory that the more females a man copulates with, the greater benefit he will derive from the act. Men who are ignorant of this art, copulating with only one or two females during their life, will only suffice to bring about their untimely and early death.

Dān (丹; 'cinnabar'; "alchemy"): Elixir of Immortality.

=== Śūraṅgama Sūtra ===
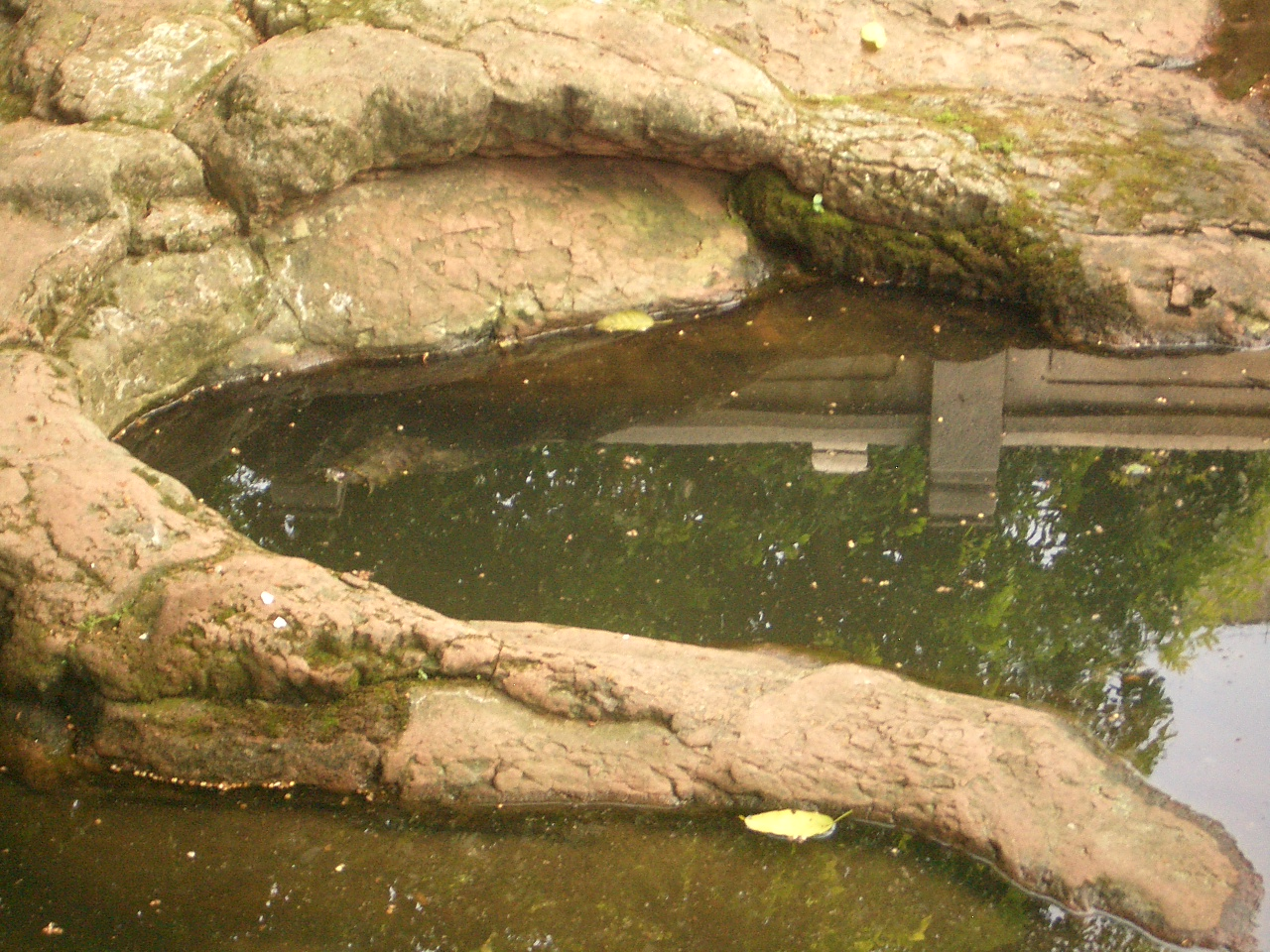
The supposed "footprint of a xian", a little pond in Guangzhou's Temple of the Five Immortals

The Śūraṅgama Sūtra, a Mahayana Buddhist manuscript, in a borrowing from Taoist teachings, discusses the characteristics of ten types of xian who exist between the world of devas ("gods") and that of human beings. This position in Buddhist literature is usually occupied by asuras. Xian as portrayed here are of a different and contrasting type of existence in Buddhist cosmology to asuras. These xian are not considered true cultivators of samadhi ("unification of mind"), as their methods differ from the practice of dhyāna ("meditation").

- Dìxíng xiān (地(行)仙; "earth-travelling immortals") – Xian who constantly ingest special food called fuer (服餌).
- Fēixíng xiān (飛(行)仙; "flying immortals") – Xian who constantly ingest certain herbs and plants.
- Yóuxíng xiān (遊(行)仙; "roaming immortals") – Xian who "transform" by constantly ingesting metals and minerals.
- Kōngxíng xiān (空(行)仙; "void-travelling immortals") – Xian who perfect their qi and essence through unceasing movement and stillness dongzhi (動止).
- Tiānxíng xiān (天(行)仙; "heaven-travelling immortals") – Xian who constantly practice control of their fluids and saliva.
- Tōngxíng xiān (通(行)仙; "all-penetrating immortals") – Xian who constantly practice the inhalation of unadulterated essences.
- Dàoxíng xiān (道(行)仙; "immortals of the Way") – Xian who achieve transcendence through unceasing recitation of spells and prohibitions.
- Zhàoxíng xiān (照(行)仙; "illuminated immortals") – Xian who achieve transcendence through constant periods of thought and recollection.
- Jīngxíng xiān (精(行)仙; "seminal immortals") – Xian who have mastered the stimuli and responses of intercourse.
- Juéxíng xiān (絕(行)仙; "absolute immortals") – Xian who "have attained the end" and perfected their awakening through constant transformation.

== In religions ==
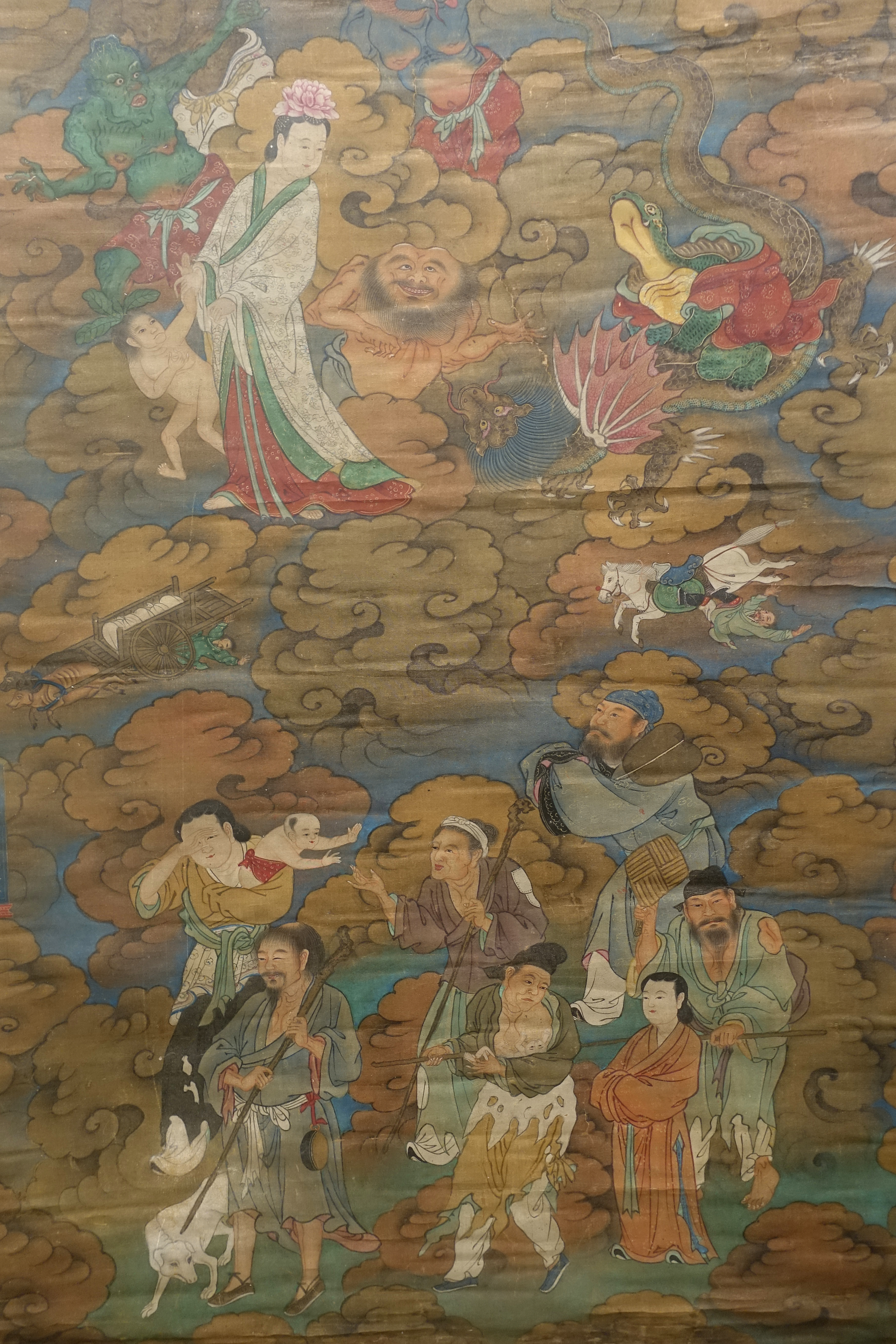
Painting of the Eight Immortals.

=== Chinese folk religion ===
In ancient Chinese folk religion, xian were regarded as deceased noblemen such as emperors and ancestors, as well as commoner "worthies". Taoism eventually altered this belief, promoting the idea of xian as holy humans either good or evil who could ascend to heaven by following practices that preserved the soul within the body while the physical body disappeared from Earth. This view became popular among folk religious practitioners.

In 2005, roughly 8% of Chinese folk practitioners believed in "immortal souls".

=== Taoism ===
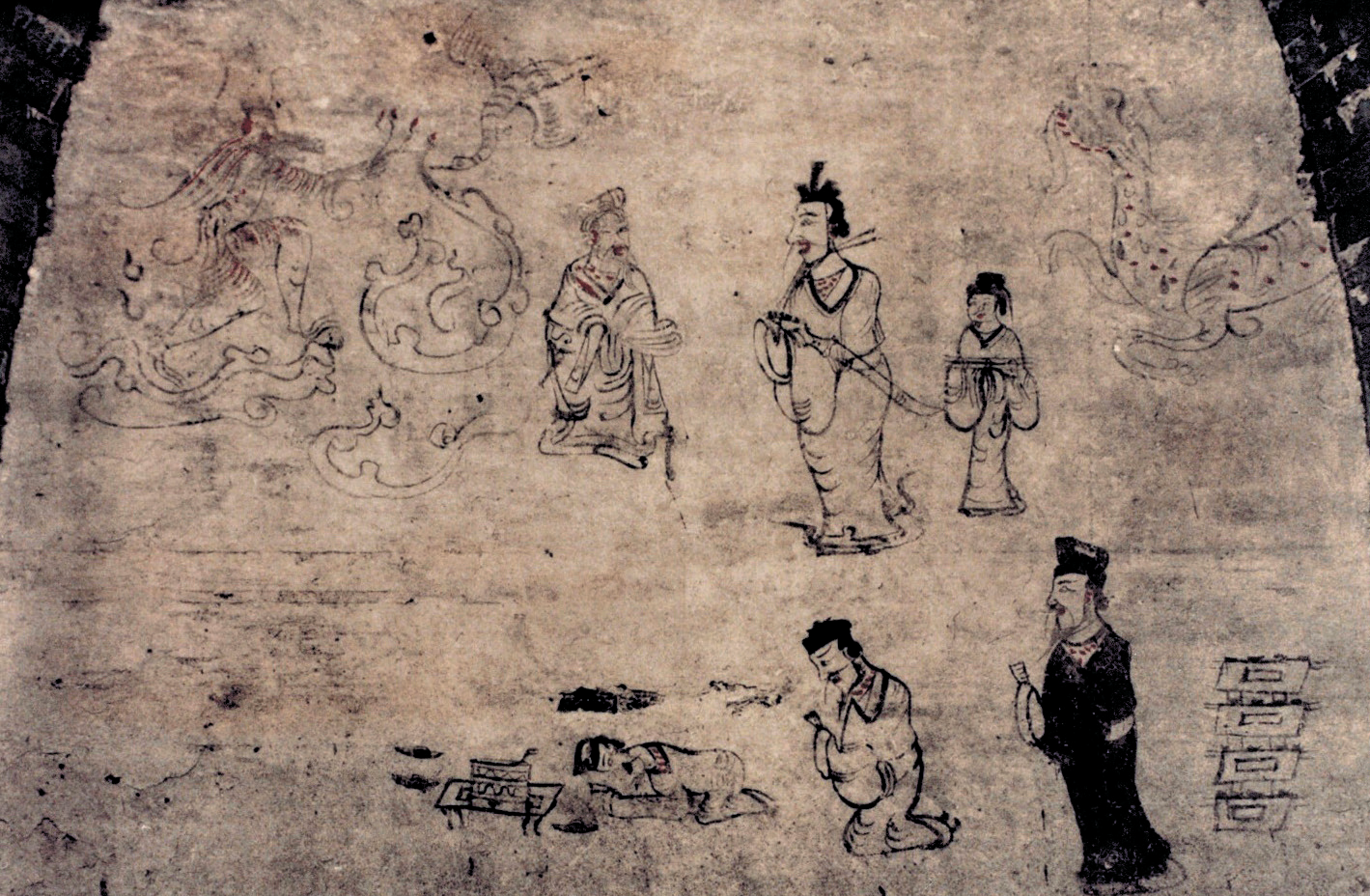
Eastern Han dynasty mural of scholar-official and heavenly beings, from Tomb of Yingchengzi.

Taoism is a polytheistic religion. Its pantheon includes both deities and immortals (神仙), generally divided into two categories: "gods" (also called deities) and xian (immortals). Many kinds of gods exist, such as gods of heaven (天神), gods of the ground (地祇), wuling (物灵; 物靈; 'the spirit of things'; "animism"), gods of the netherworld (地府神灵; 地府神靈), gods of the human body (人体之神; 人體之神), and gods of human ghosts (人鬼之神). These gods are innately divine beings. In contrast, xian become persons with vast supernatural powers, unpredictable changes, and immortality through the culivation of the Dao. In China, "gods" are often referred to together with "xian".

Taoists sometimes shared with folk practitioners the belief that noblemen and ancestors could become xian, although Taoism also developed alternative interpretations.

Many Taoists believed that xian were spirits of human origin and that humans could themselves achieve this status. It was believed that they could become immortals by refining their bodies throughout their lives by taking drugs and/or performing the correct amount of good deeds and repentant acts to make up for bad deeds throughout their lives. Heaven, and therefore, status as an immortal, was also thought to be accessible through being an unenlightened soul in the afterlife that is prayed for in the collective salvation prayers of Taoist temple worshippers, who pray in the hope that souls will reach a better status in their death.

== In art and culture ==
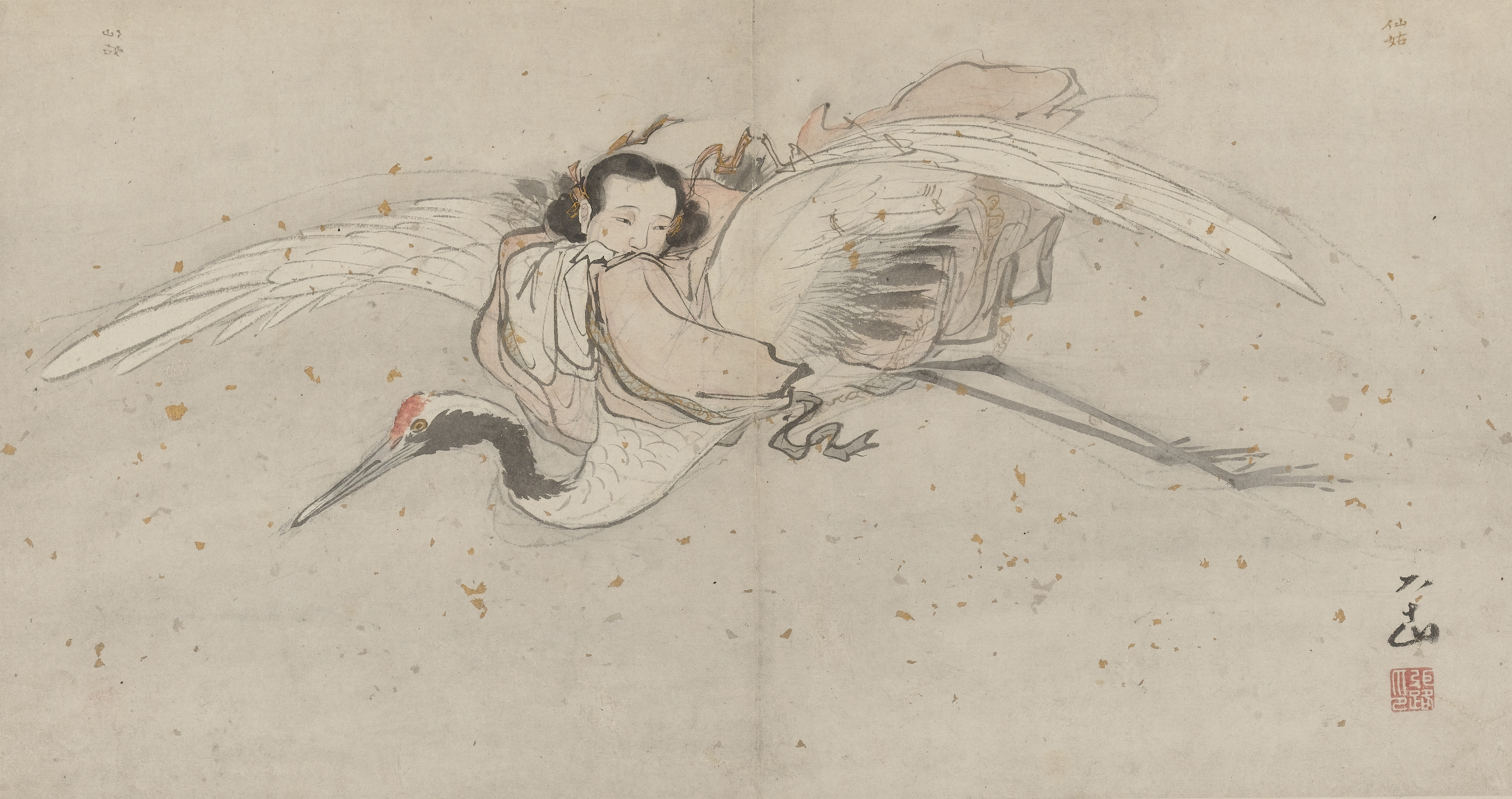
The red-crowned crane was a symbol of longevity and immortality. In art and literature, immortals are often depicted riding on cranes.

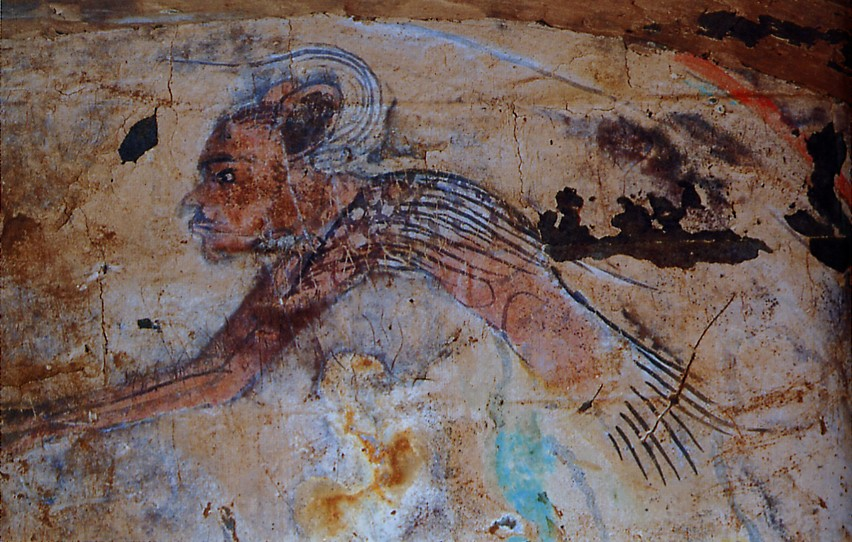
Detail of a "feathered immortal" (羽人) riding a dragon on a mural from a late Western Han dynasty tomb in Xi'an

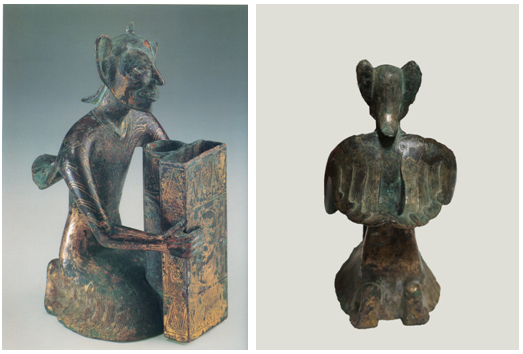
Bronze Winged Immortal figure from Eastern Han dynasty.

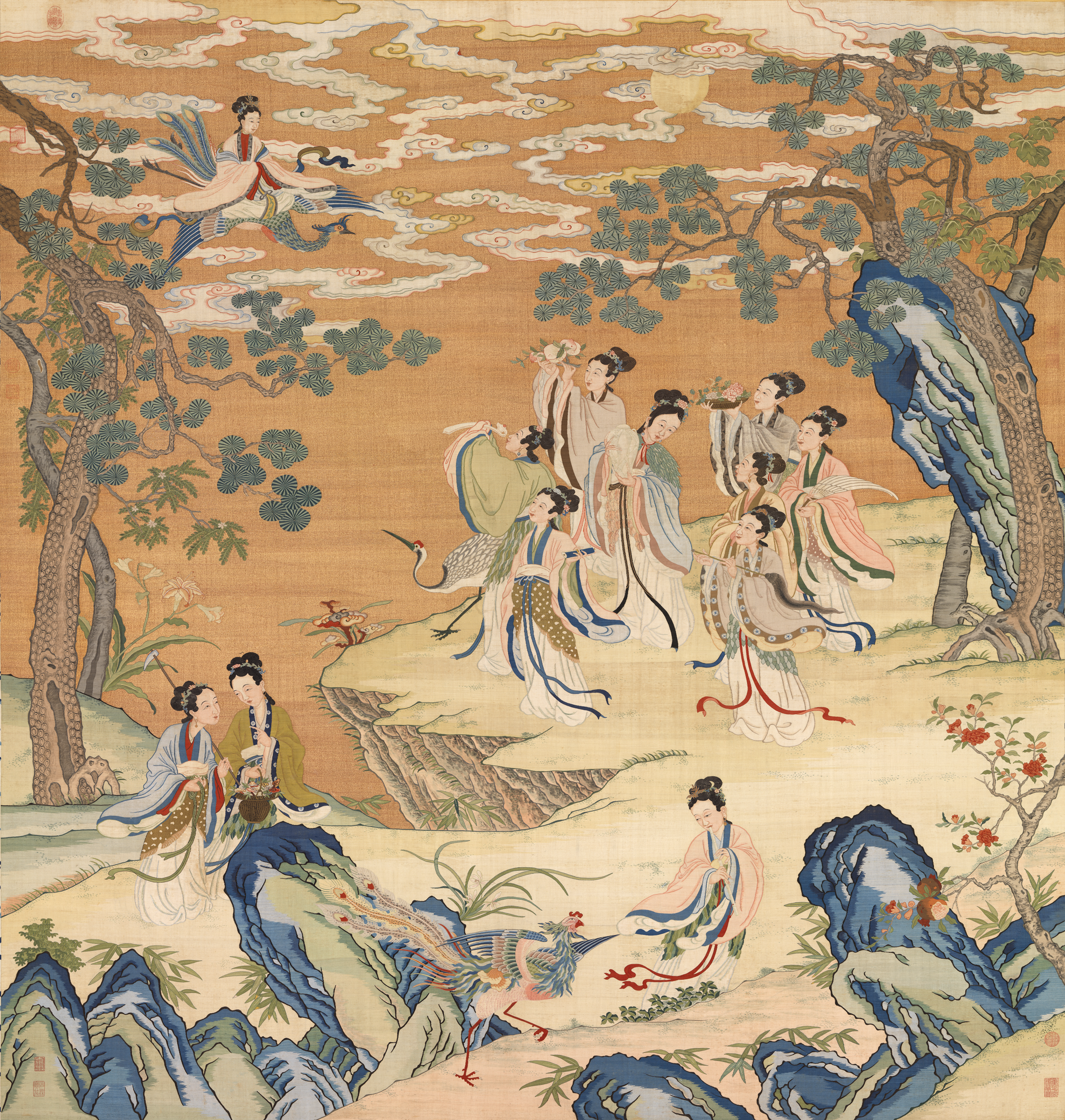
Assembly of Immortals Offering Good Wishes for Long Life, Ming-Qing dynasty painting.

According to Michael Loewe, the earliest artistic and textual evidence of xian transcendents dates from the fifth or fourth centuries BCE. They were depicted as avian or serpentine hybrids capable of flight, usually as a bird's body with a human face, or as a human figure with wings sprouting from the back—known as yuren (羽人; 'feathered person').

According to John Lagerway, the earliest artistic representations of xian date from the 2nd century BCE.

In tomb reliefs from the Eastern Han dynasty (25–220 CE), xian are often shown as bird–human or reptile–human hybrids. They are depicted as "liminal but spiritually empowered figures' who accompanied a deceased soul to paradise. These "transient figures" are frequently portrayed alongside animals such as deer, tigers, dragons, birds, and heavenly horses (天马; 天馬; tianma). These avian, serpentine, and human hybrid xian are frequently depicted with "secondary characteristics" including androgyny, large ears, long hair, exaggerated nonhuman faces, tattoo-like markings and nudity; many of these traits also appear in depictions of foreigners, who also lived outside the Chinese cultural and spiritual sphere.

Xian were associated with yin and yang, and some Taoist sects held that the "adept of immortality" could get in touch with the "pure energies possessed at birth by every infant" to become a xian. According to these beliefs, a Taoist who became a xian could live for 1,000 years in the human world before transforming into "pure yang energy" and ascending to Tiān (Heaven).

In modern and historical times, xian are also thought to draw power and be created from the Tao in its aspect as "the source of all being, in which life and death are the same."

Xian are conventionally regarded as benevolent spirits who bring good fortune. Some Taoists prayed to individual xian or entire pantheons of them for assistance in life or forgiveness of sins.

Refugee communities and their descendants, wanderers, and Taoists who were societal recluses inspired myths of "timeless" worlds where xian lived. In many Taoist sects, xian were thought to "dress...in feathers" and live in the atmosphere "just off-planet" and explore various places in the universe to perform "various actions and miracles." A Confucian cosmology that had immortals in it viewed them as beings of a "heavenly world", which was "above the earthly world" that was distinct "from a dark underworld".

Some mythical xian were worshipped and/or seen as gods or zhenren, and some real Taoists were thought to become xian if they died after performing certain rituals or living a certain way and gain the ability to explore "heavenly realms". These Taoists' spirits after death would be seen as divine entities that were synonymous with xian, and were often referred to by that name.

Becoming a xian was often seen as a heroic "quest" in Taoist mythos to either become as powerful as a god or multiple gods or gain an immortal lifespan like a god. Given that many Taoists believed that their gods and gods belonging to different ethnic groups and other religions were subject to the roles the Tao made for them, becoming a xian is technically a process that lets a practitioner get enough holy or spiritual power to defy that role, and some Taoists chose to worship xian instead of gods, Some Taoists may have believed that a single xian was more powerful than entire pantheons of gods of China. Before and during the early Tang dynasty, beliefs about death that included xian were more notable among ordinary Chinese than their Buddhist counterparts, and some who were inclined towards Taoism or were part of a Taoist religious organization and believed in the existence of Buddhist deities believed that xian, collectively, were more powerful and relevant than Buddhist gods.

Some sects thought xian were more worthy to venerate than gods because of their admirable qualities or their being more powerful in only few specific ways, such as comprehension of some heavenly powers and/or the spiritual location they live in, while acknowledging their lack of strength and their typical place in the celestial hierarchy being below gods.

During the Han dynasty and Tang dynasty, beliefs about xian and the process of becoming one were especially popular. Chinese folk religion practitioners in the Tang dynasty, when Chinese religious traditions were more entrenched, drew symbols of immortality and paintings with Taoist symbolism on tombs so their family members could have a chance at becoming xian, and this happened in the Han dynasty as well before some theological ideas that would become popular later on.

In Buddhist-inspired Taoism and Buddhist traditions that venerated Laozi and/or other Taoist icons, a minority of xian on Mount Kunlun and the wider world spoke Sanskrit and/or other foreign languages, as it was seen as a sacred language and possibly because some xian were thought of as spirits of Indian origin or ascended humans from the same area or other parts of the world.

A pseudo-Sanskrit language that was mixed with Chinese and was often random in its structure and mixture of the two called "the sounds of Brahmā-heaven" was also seen as another sacred language used as a liturgical language, and was frequently confused with Sanskrit. It was thought of as an important godly language that a Taoist version of Brahmā spoke and that some immortals also spoke to a lesser degree which was the embodiment of the Tao, "the esoteric sounds of the heavens", and "the beginning of the universe". The language also represented the harmonious relation between the gods, who Brahmā ruled over, and Indian and Buddhist philosophy thought to be transmitted by Laozi.

Immortal in Splashed ink, by Liang Kai, Southern Song dynasty

In Japan, the image of the sennin appeared in many legends and artworks, such as miniature sculptures (netsuke). An 18th-century wooden netsuke depicts it shows a perplexed old man resting one hand on the curve of a snag while rubbing his head with the other. He gazes toward the sky with his right leg tucked up. This posture was commonly used to depict Sennin Tekkay whose soul was said to inhabit the body of a lame beggar. This legendary figure was also portrayed by Jobun, a prominent early carver. A similar humorous depiction of xian in China came in the form of Dongfang Shuo a deified Han dynasty scholar who was thought to be a "clown" xian after death. Legends about him also circulated in Japan and Korea.

Sennin is a common Japanese character name. For example, Ikkaku Sennin (一角仙人 "One-horned Immortal") was a Noh play by Komparu Zenpō (金春禅鳳, 1454–1520?). The Japanese legend of Gama Sennin (蝦蟇仙人 "Toad Immortal") is based upon Chinese Liu Hai, a fabled 10th-century alchemist who learned the secret of immortality from the Chan Chu ("Three-legged Money Toad").

In Korea, among commoners who belonged to no specific religious tradition, the desire to become an immortal, imported from China and Korean Taoist sects, mostly manifested itself in the wish for merely longer life instead of living forever. Peaks and valleys were commonly named after the xian, and Buddhist principles were also sometimes thought to be important to becoming one in Korea and art communities in Korea often approved of paintings of Taoist immortals and others depicting Buddhist symbolism. Xian were sometimes viewed as gods in Korea.

== Depictions of xians, sennins and tiên in art ==
=== Gallery ===
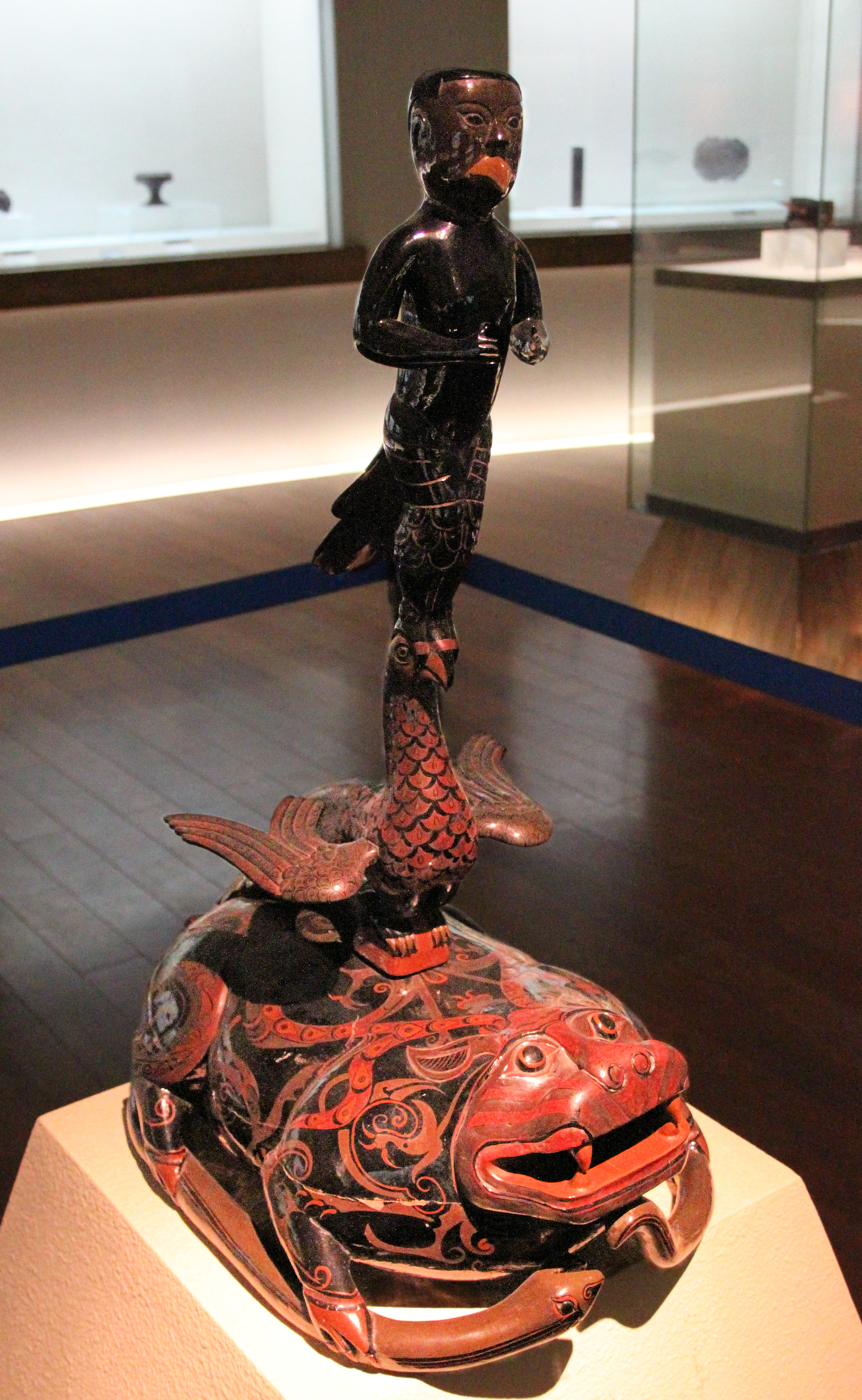
Lacquered yuren (羽人) figure on a toad stand from the Chu kingdom of the Warring States.

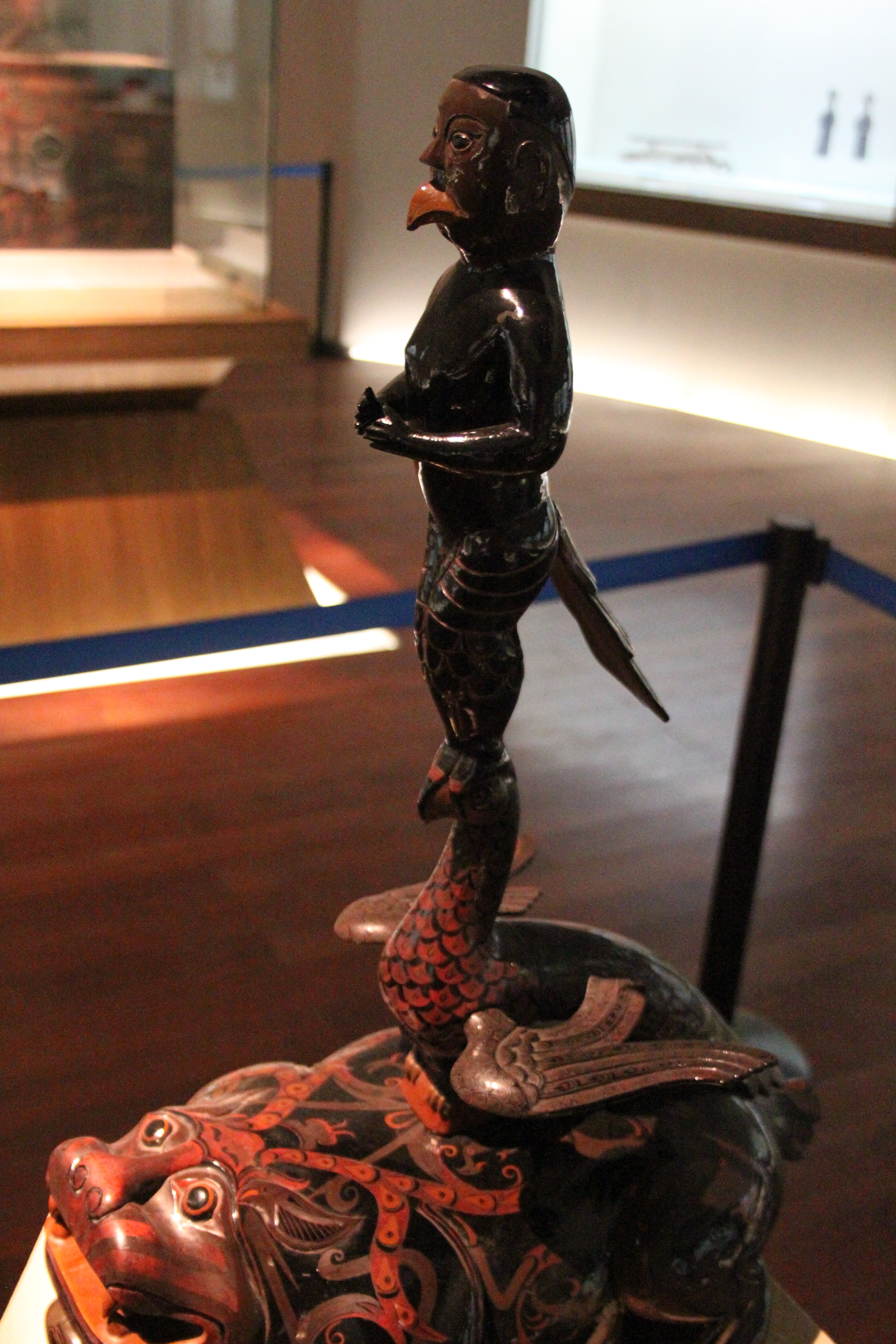

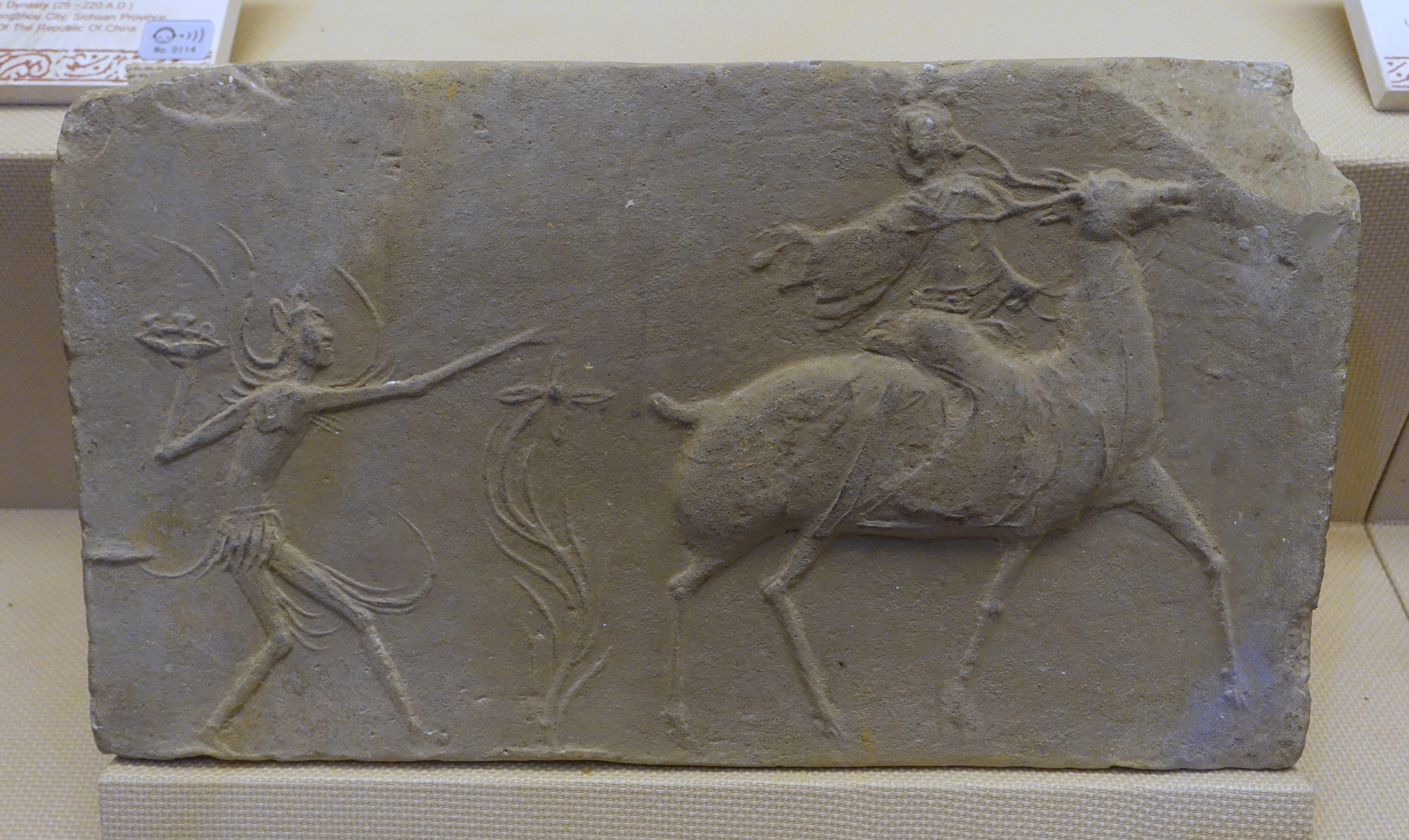
A Han dynasty stone-relief of Immortal and a deer rider.

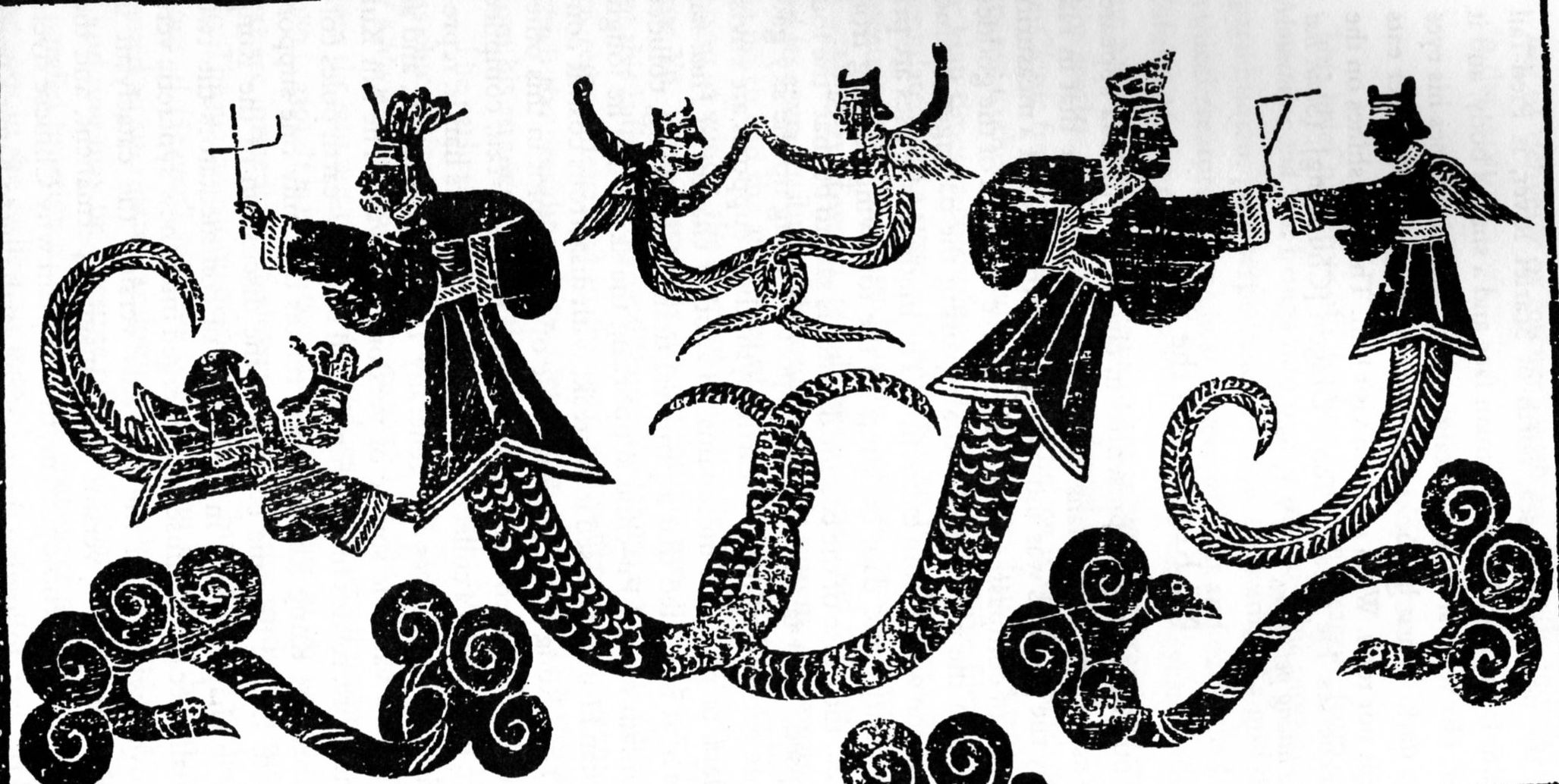
Nüwa and Fuxi surrounded by other flying immortals, Han dynasty.

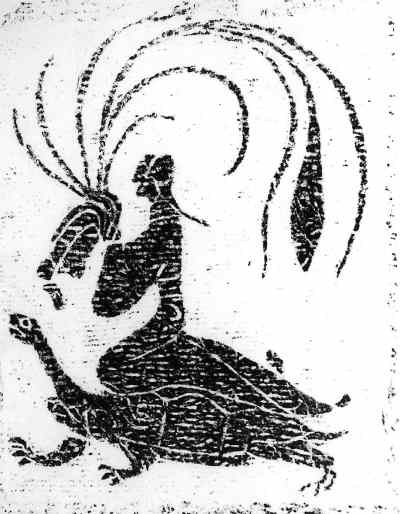
An immortal riding a tortoise. A Han dynasty stone-relief rubbing.

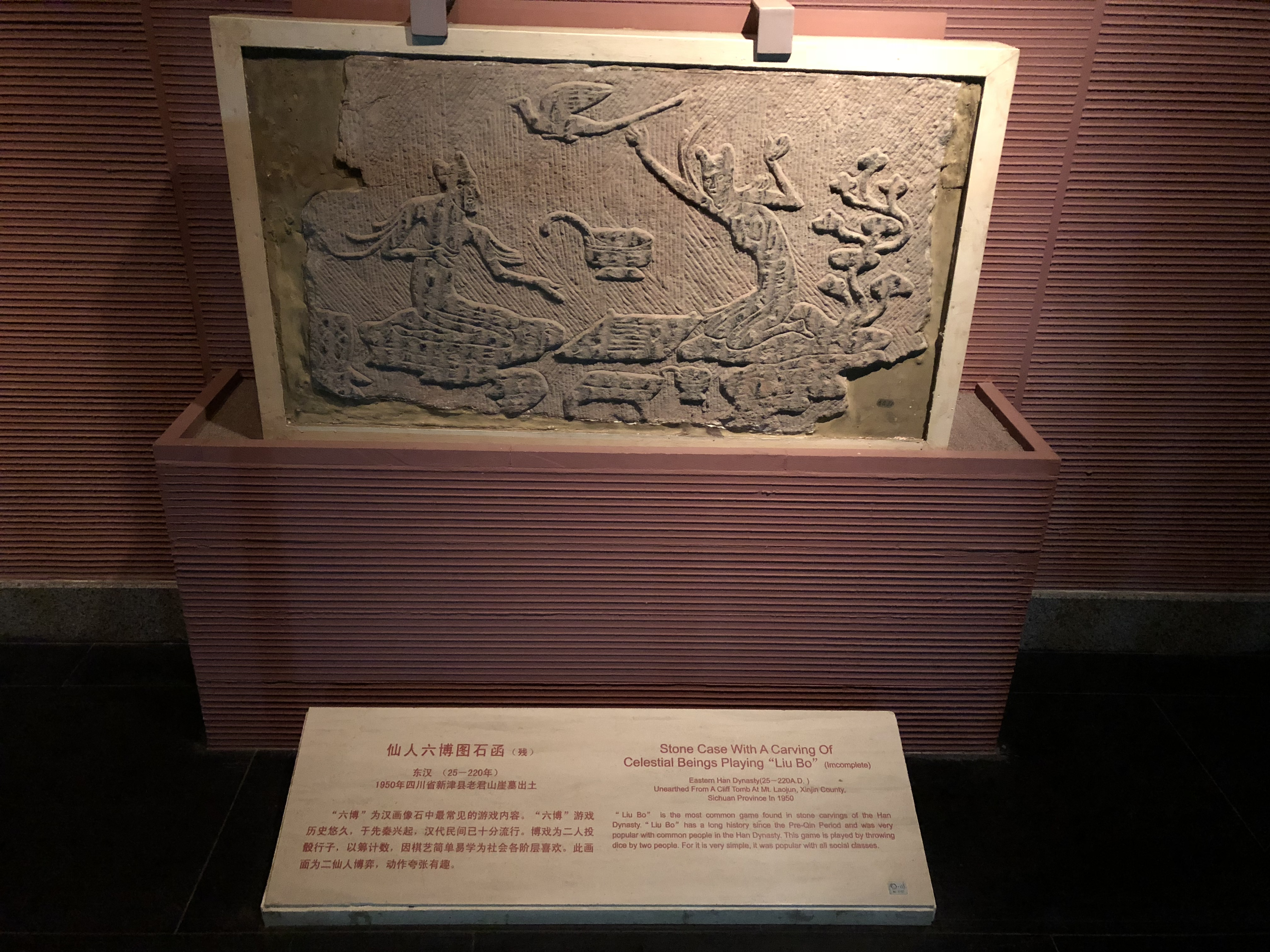
Feathered Immortals playing Liubo. Han dynasty stone-relief.

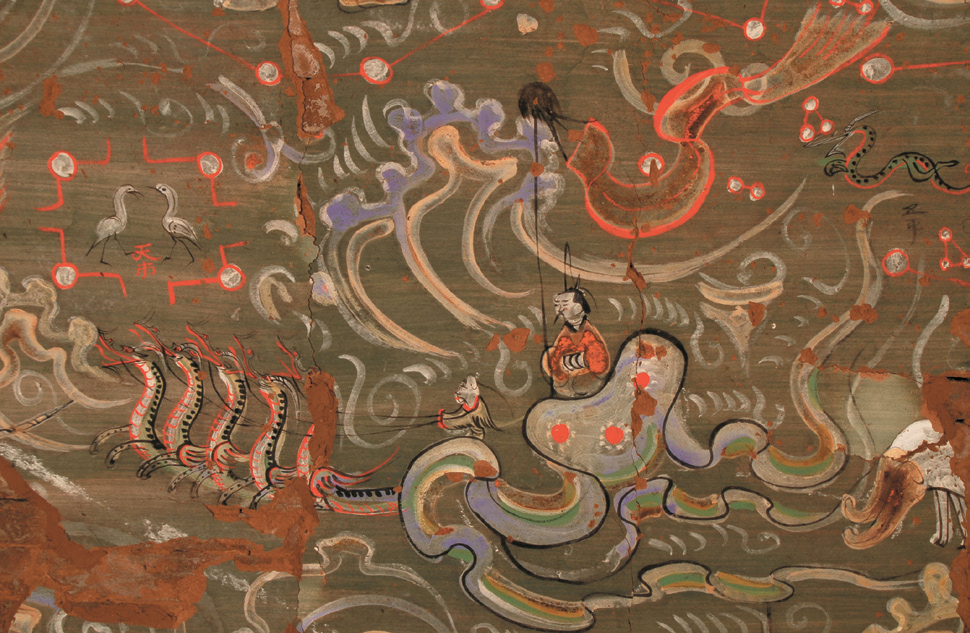
Mural showing heavenly beings riding on chariot driven by dragons, of a tomb of the Xin dynasty in Jingbian County, Shaanxi.

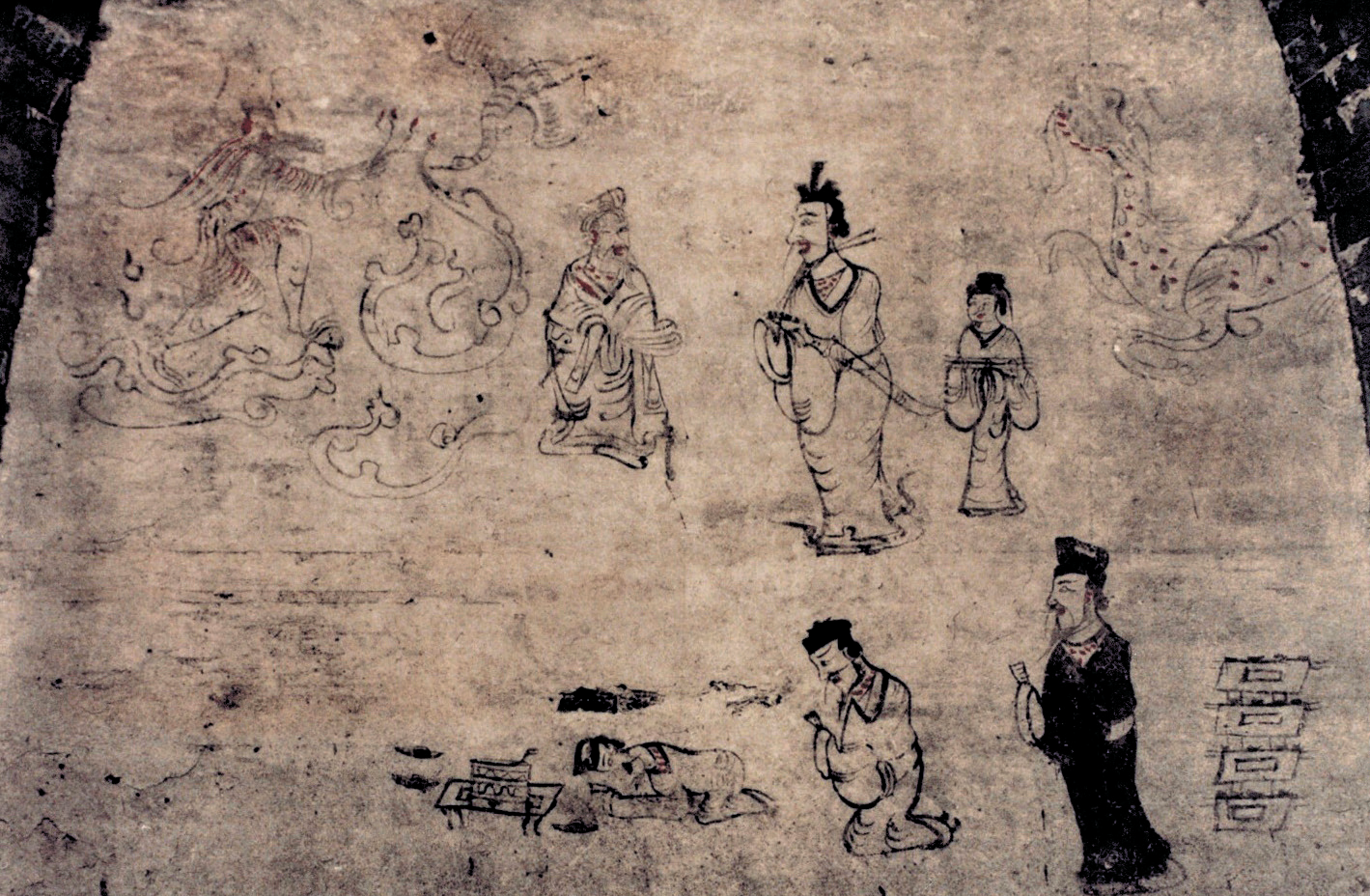
Eastern Han dynasty mural of scholar-official and heavenly beings, from Tomb of Yingchengzi.

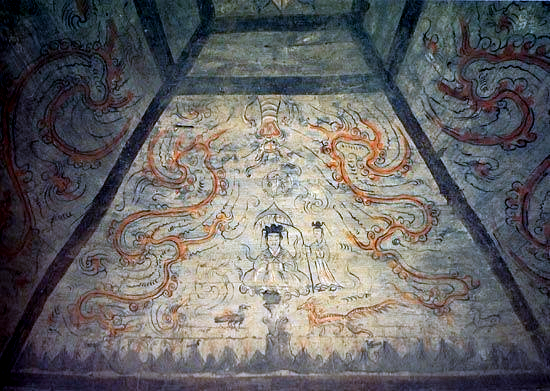
Xiwangmu Dingjiazha Tomb No. 5, Northern Liang

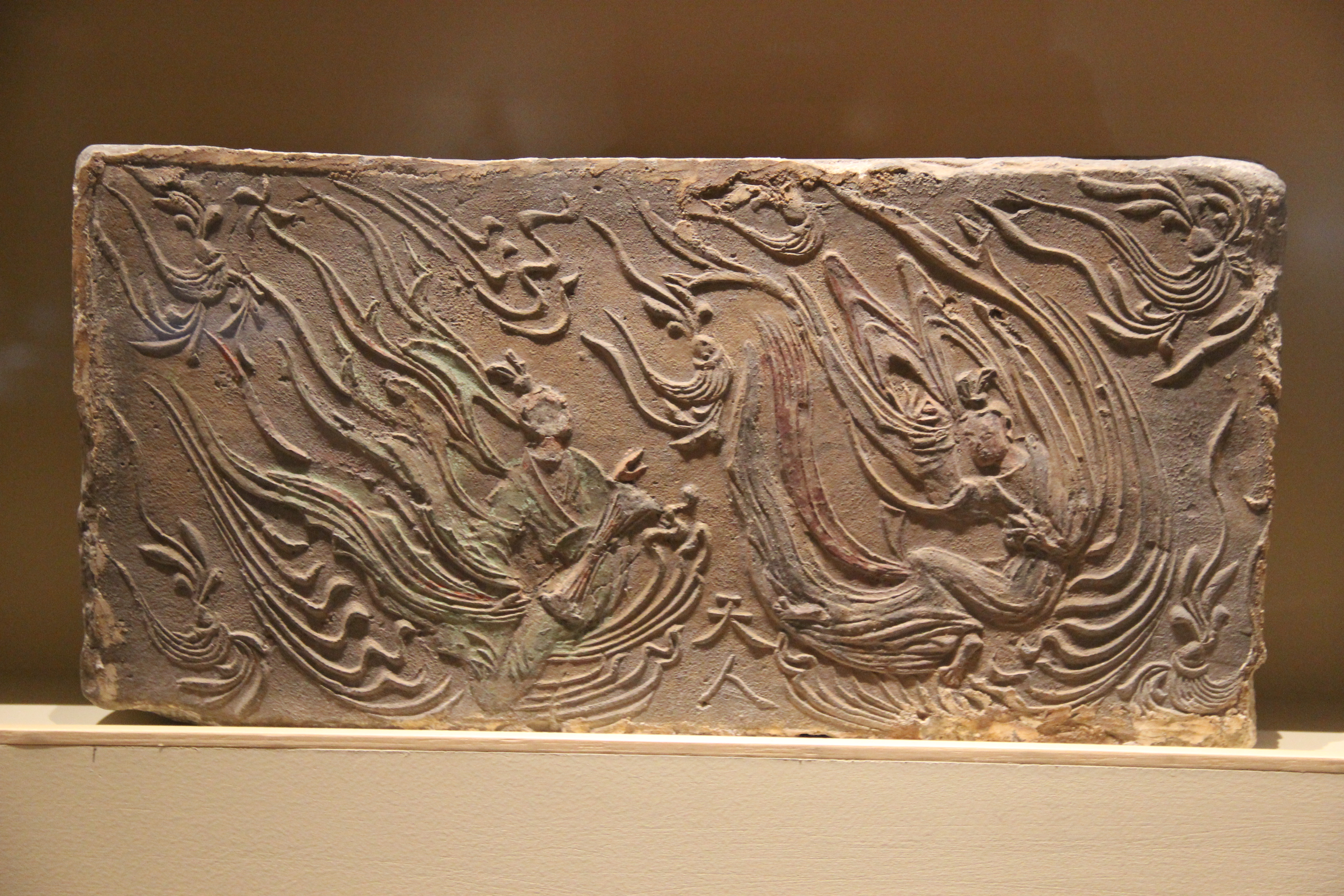
Winged xian flying in the heavens, Dengzhou painted stone-relief, Liu Song dynasty.

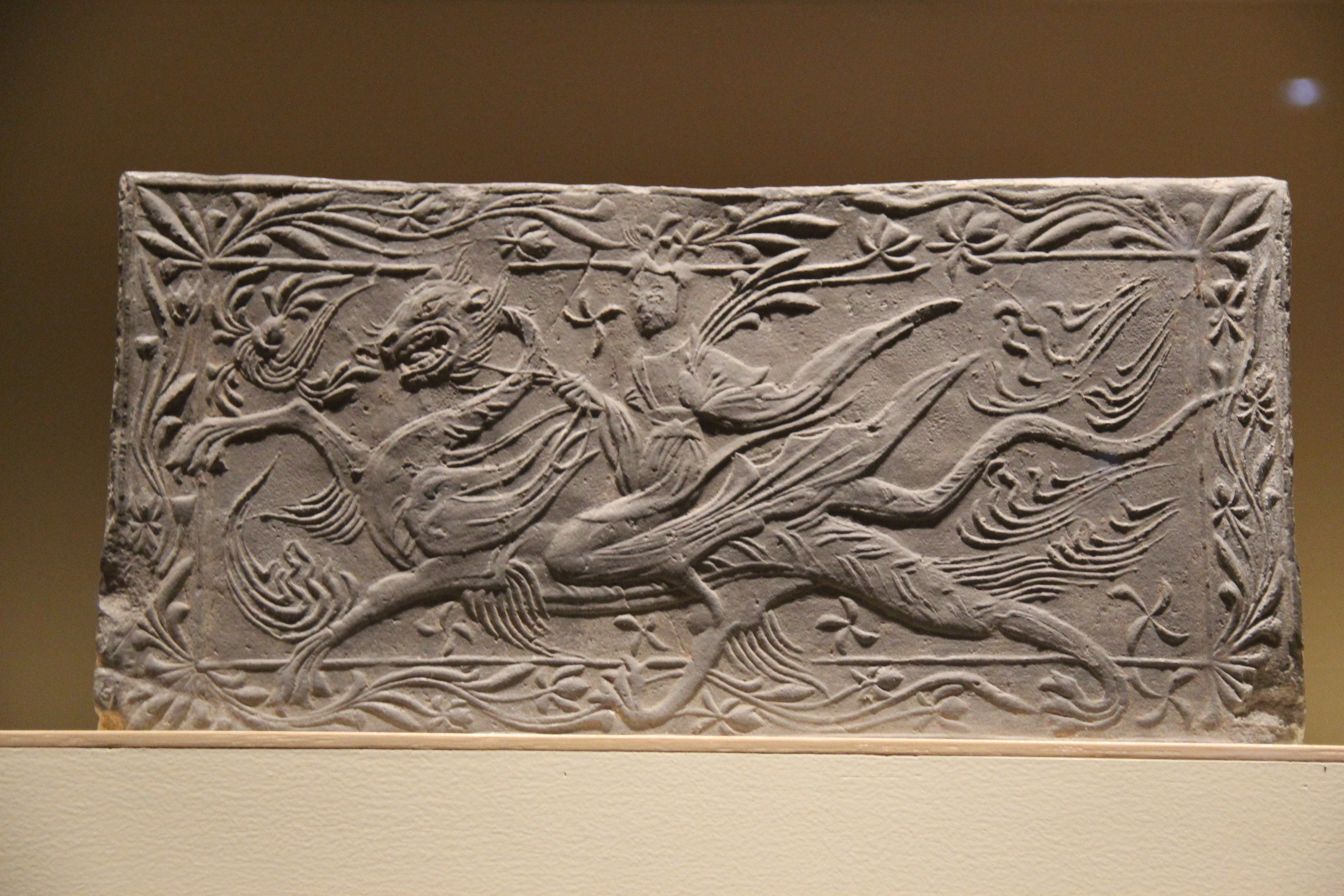
An immortal riding on a dragon, Dengzhou painted stone-relief, Liu Song dynasty.

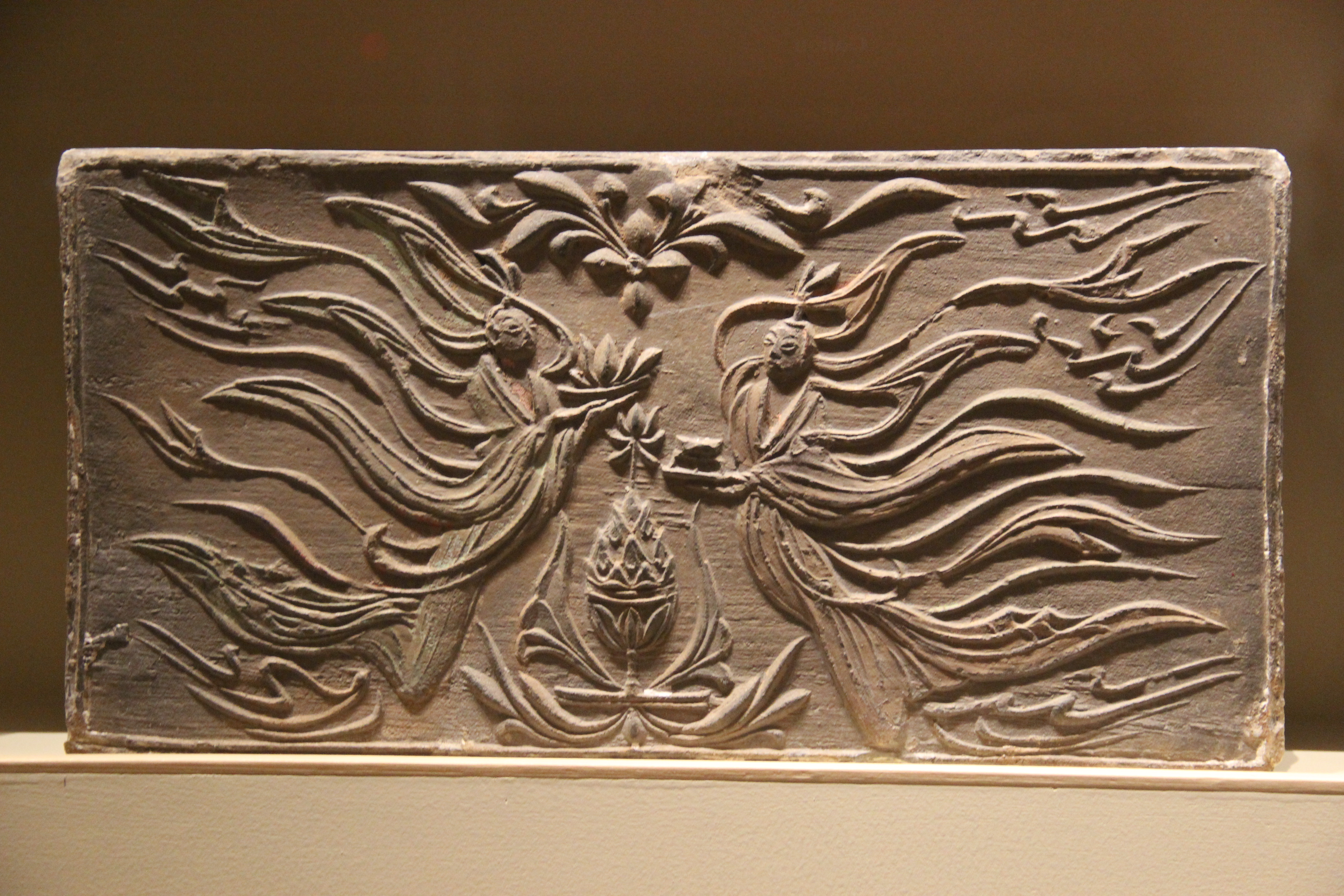
Two immortals, Dengzhou painted stone-relief, Liu Song dynasty.

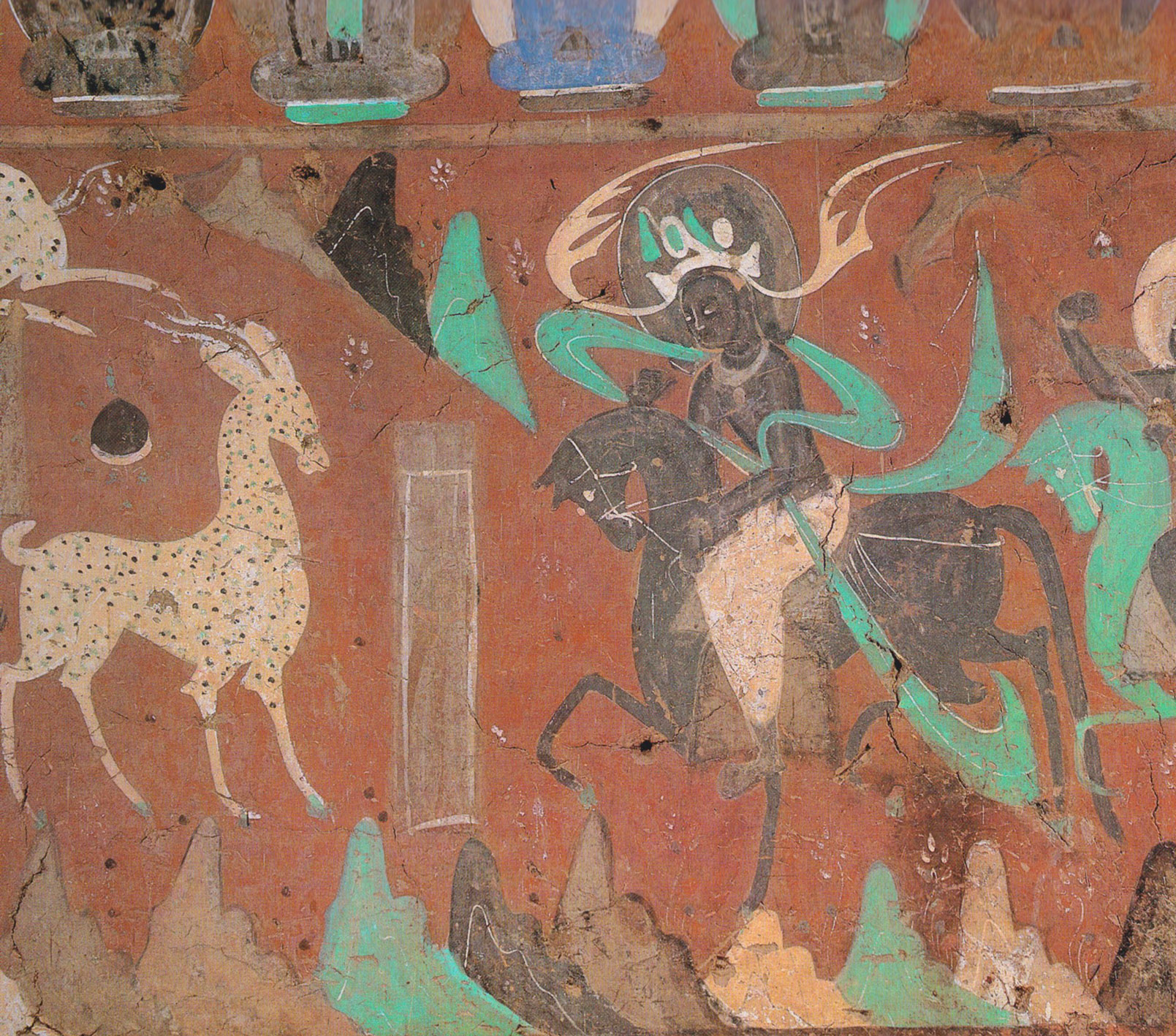
Mogao Cave no. 257mural of the Nine-colored deer and a deity, Northern Wei dynasty

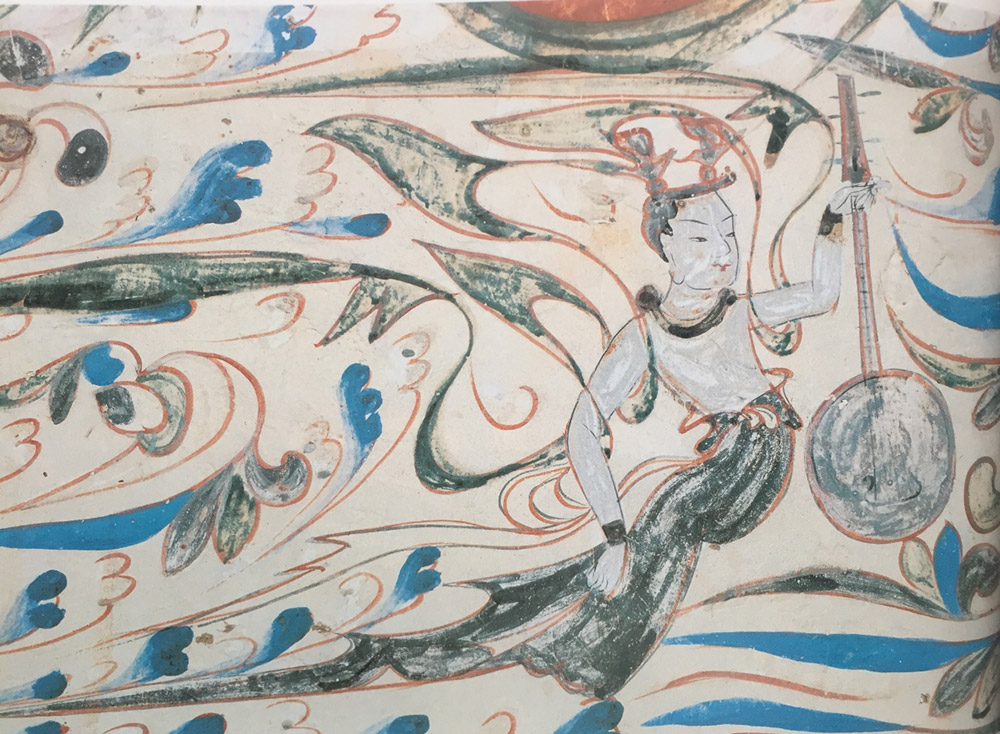
Deity with Yueqin on Mogao Cave no.285 mural, Western Wei dynasty.

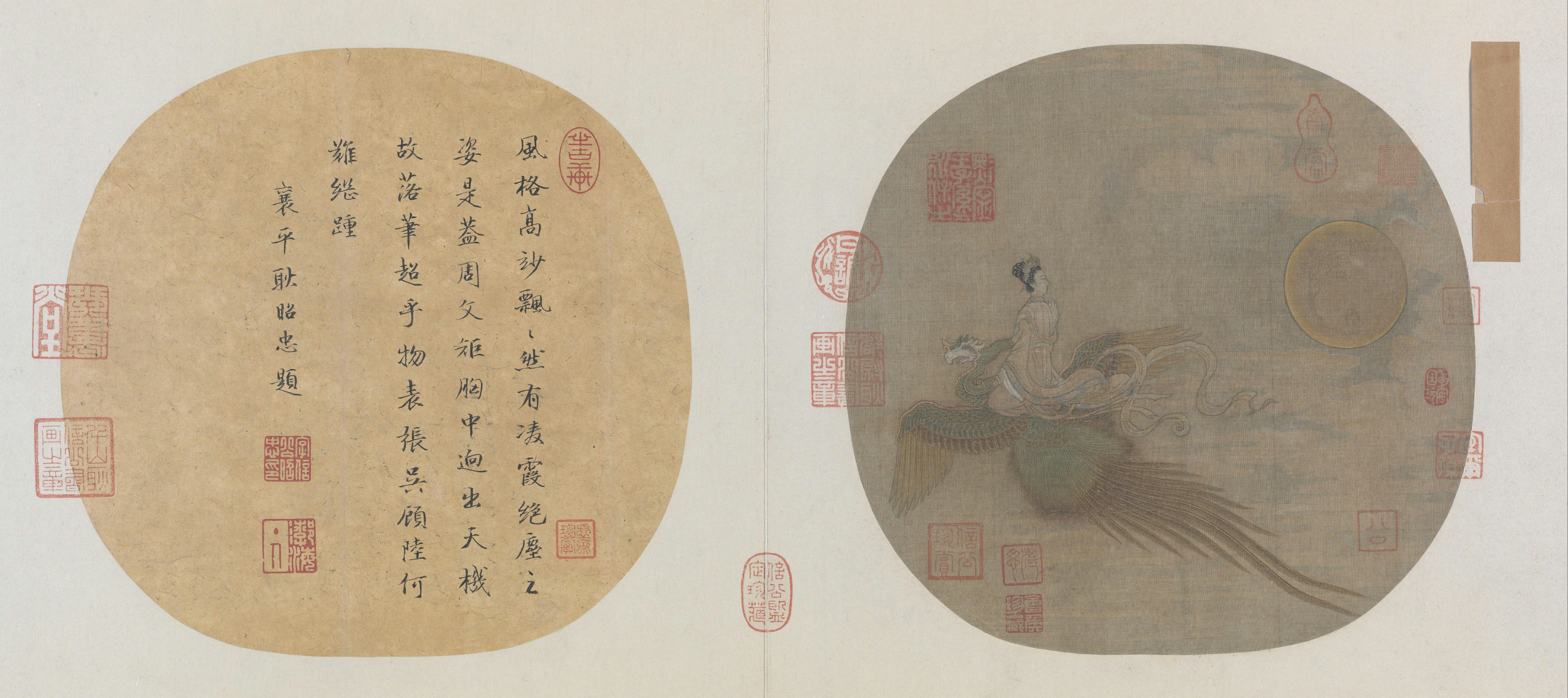
Female Immortal riding a luán-bird, Song dynasty

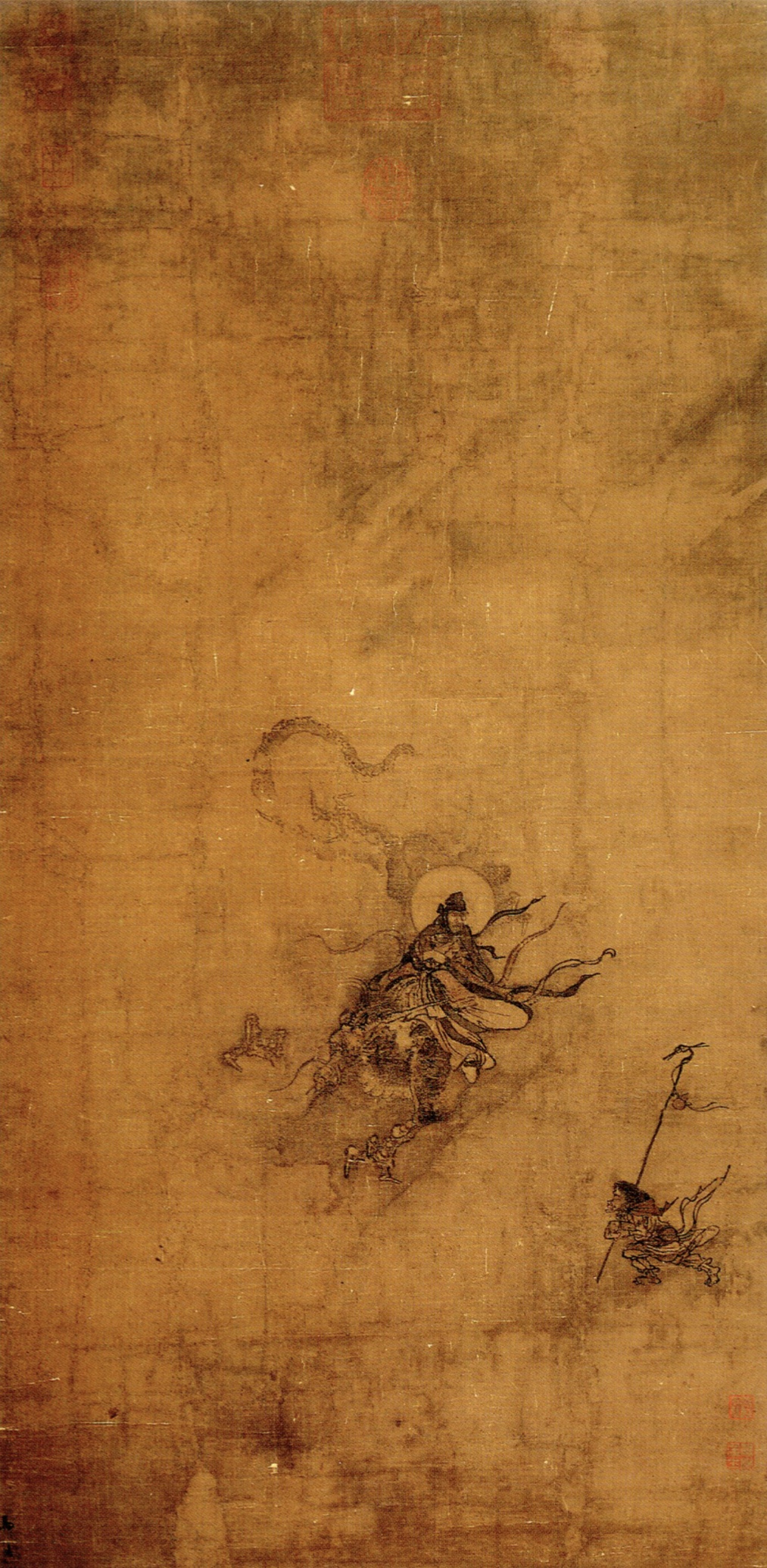
Immortal Riding a Dragon by Ma Yuan. Southern Song dynasty

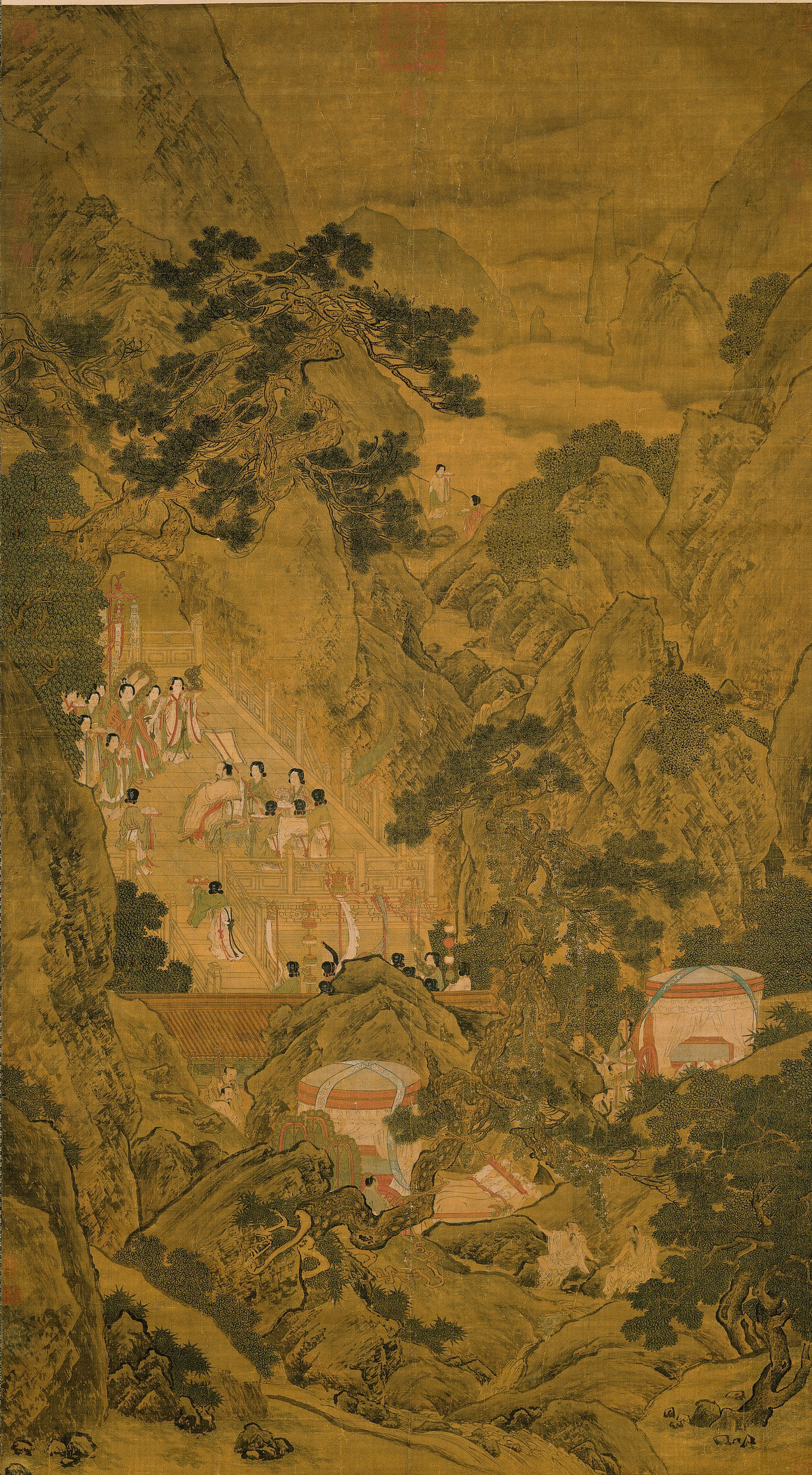
Painting of Xiwangmu meeting with a Chinese regent in the Jade Pond, likely King Mu of Zhou or Emperor Wu of Han, Song dynasty

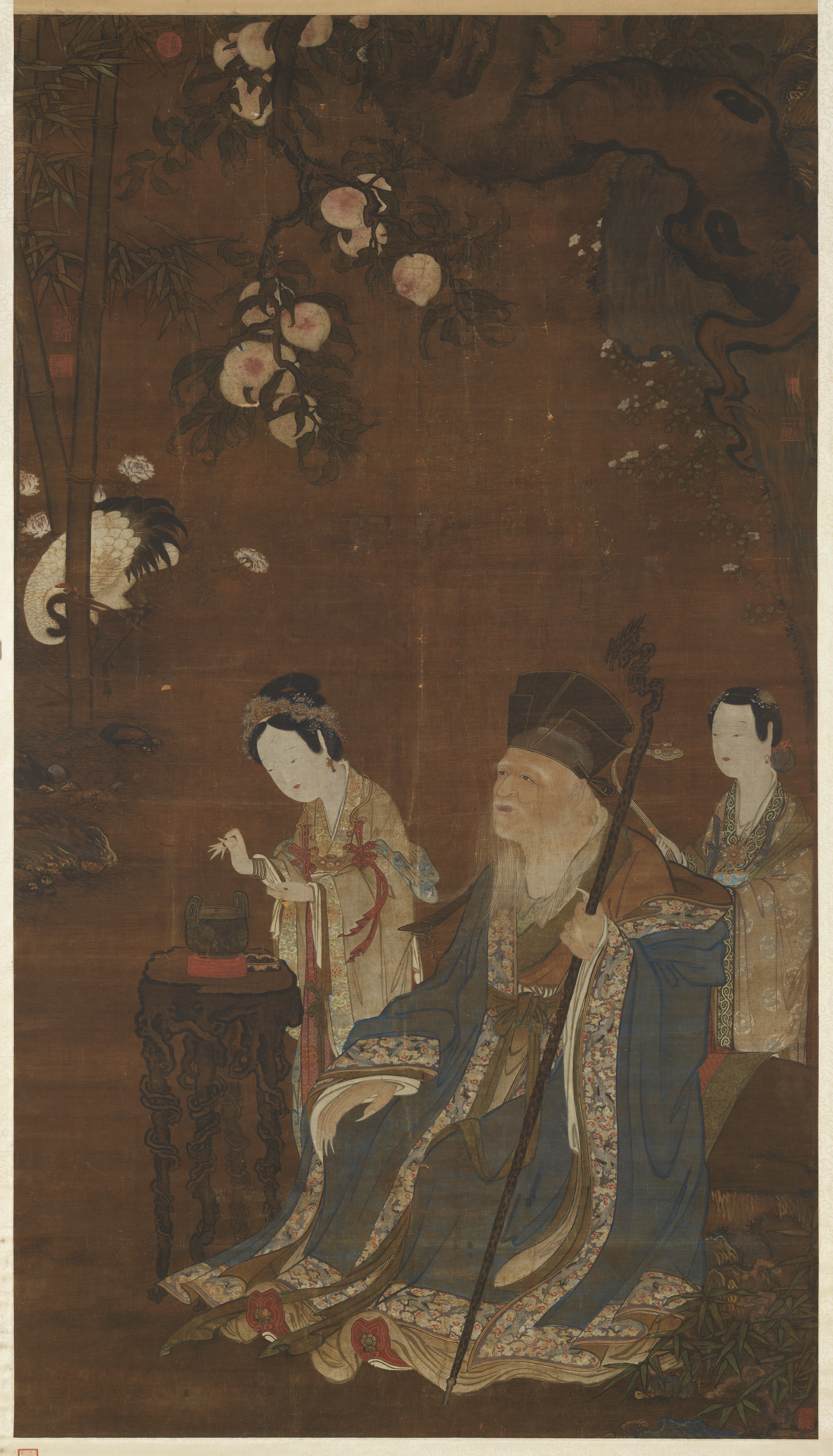
The Immortal Zhang Guolao at Repose, Song dynasty

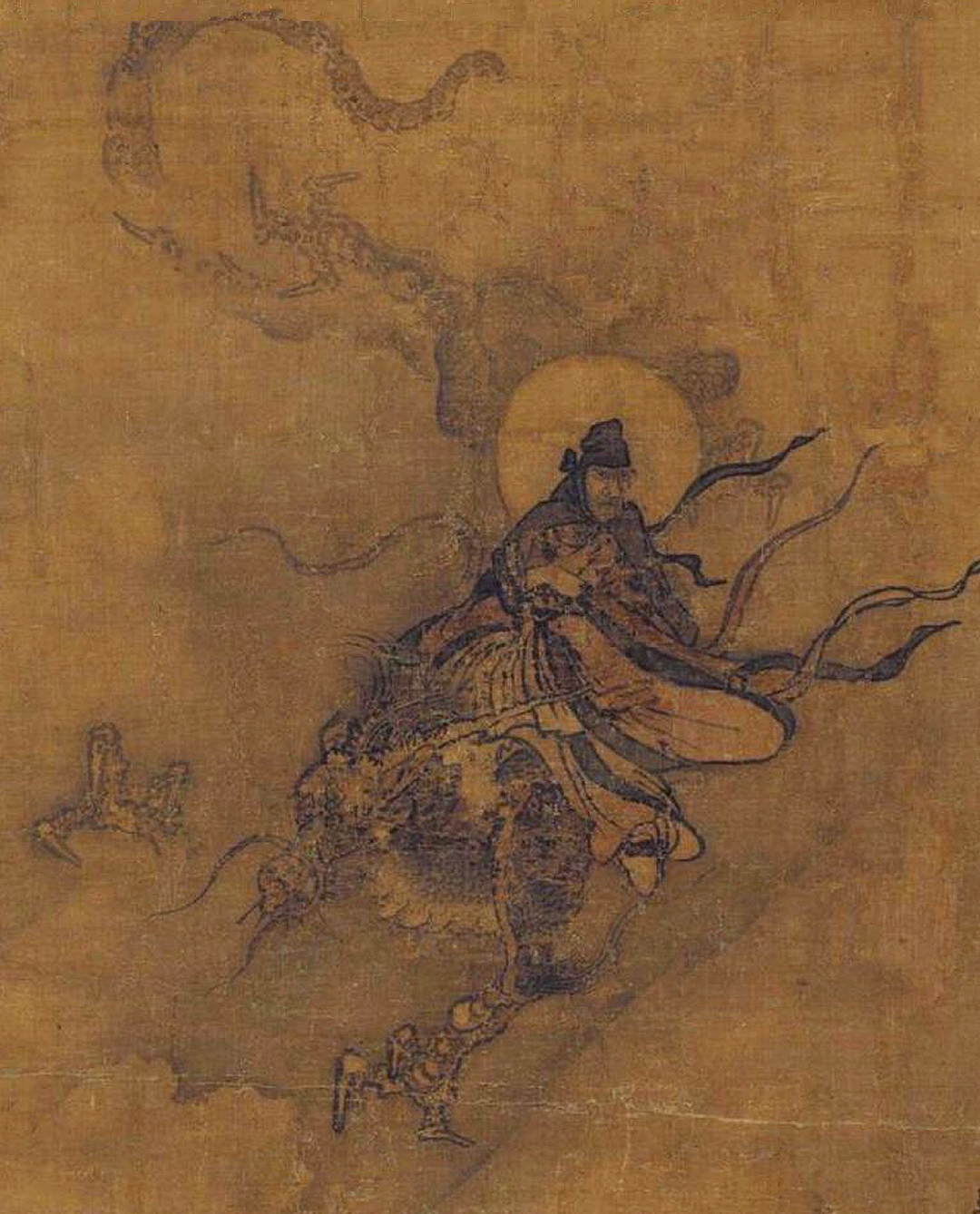
Immortal riding a Dragon, by Ma Yuan.

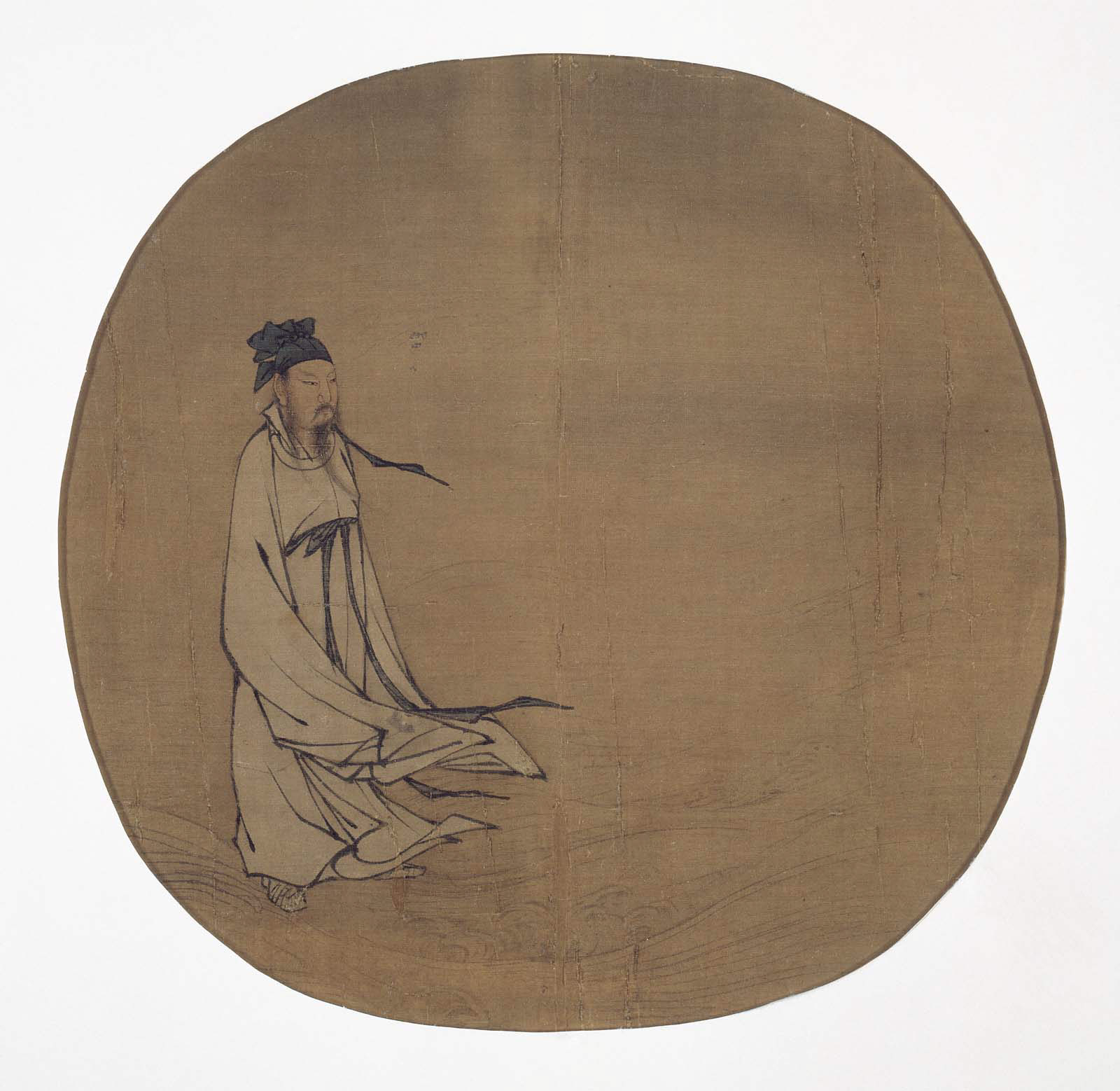
The Daoist immortal Lü Dongbin crossing Lake Dongting, Song dynasty

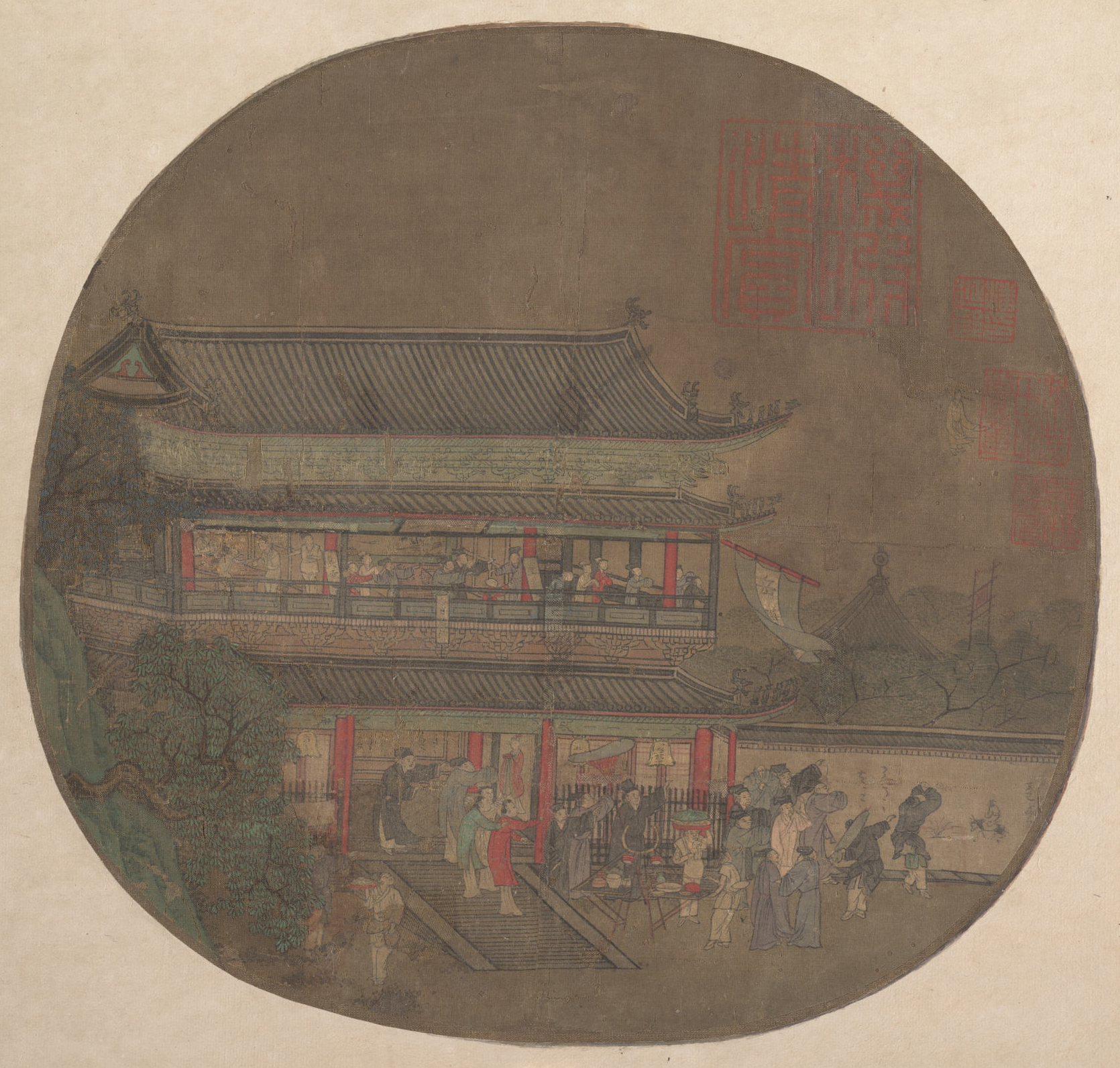
Immortal Lü Dongbin Appearing over the Yueyang Pavilion, Song dynasty

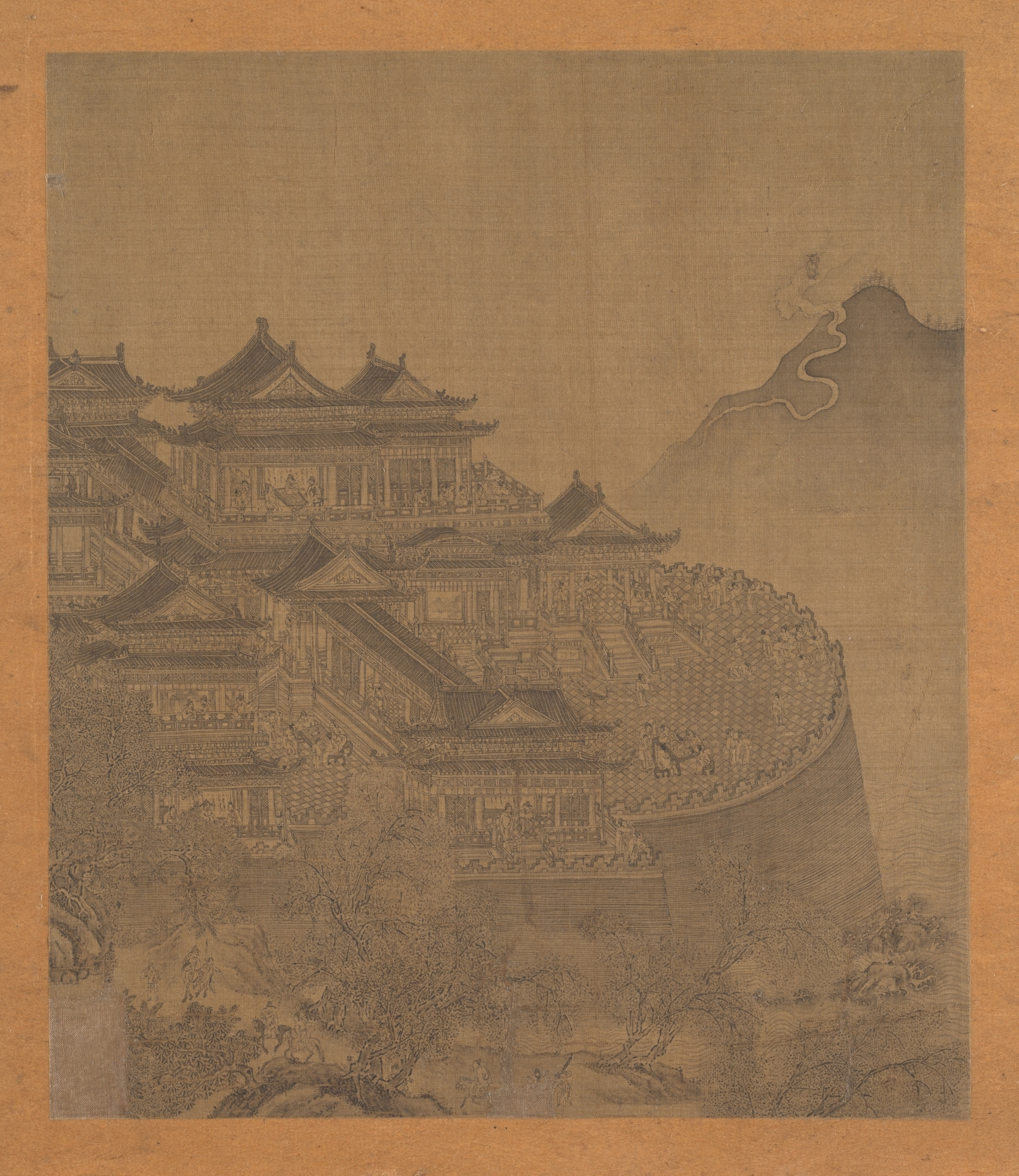
The Immortal Lü Dongbin Appearing over the Yueyang Pavilion, Yuan dynasty.

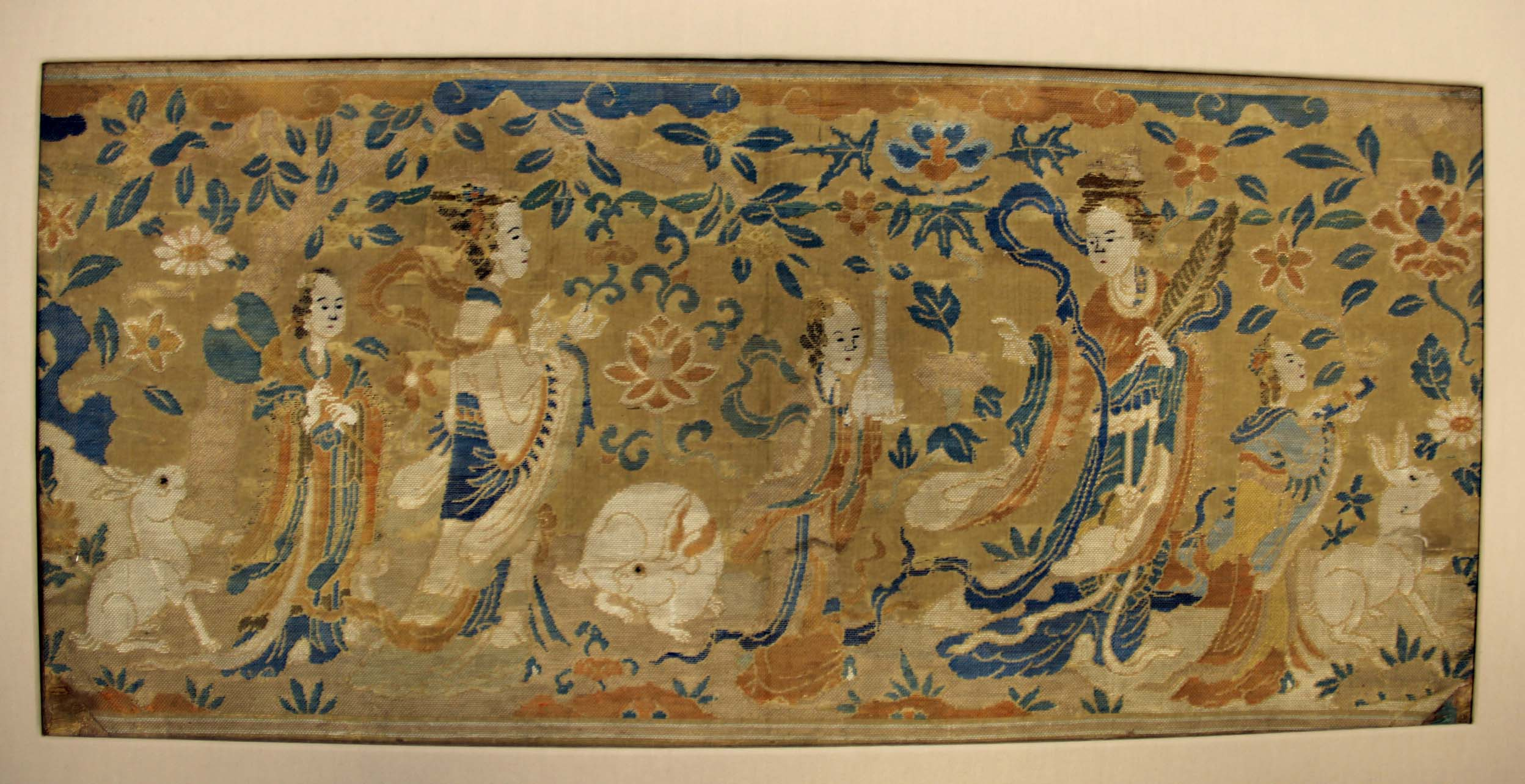
Song dynasty brocade depicting the Moon Goddess Chang'e and Attendants

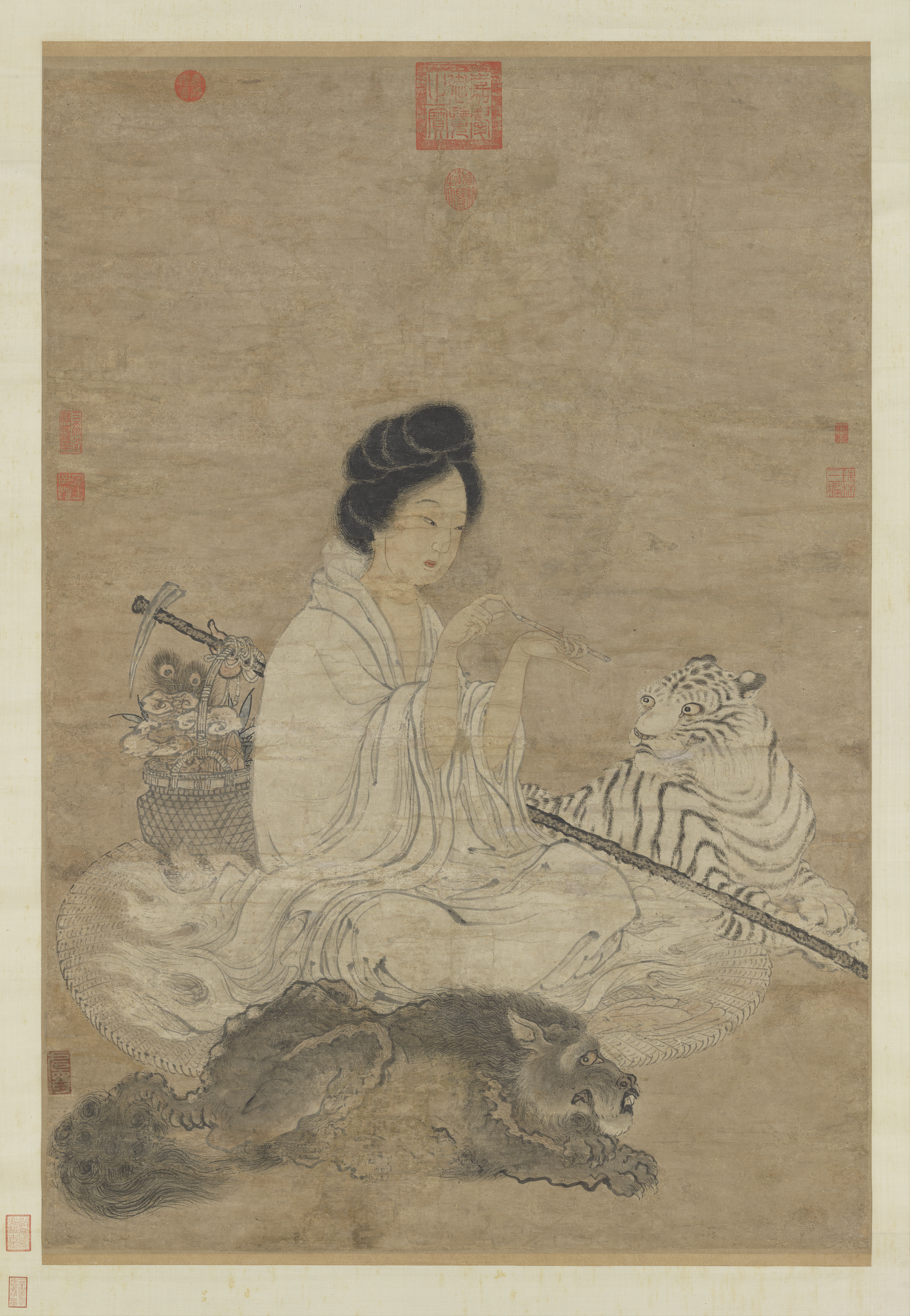
Female Immortal, unknown artist, Yuan dynasty.

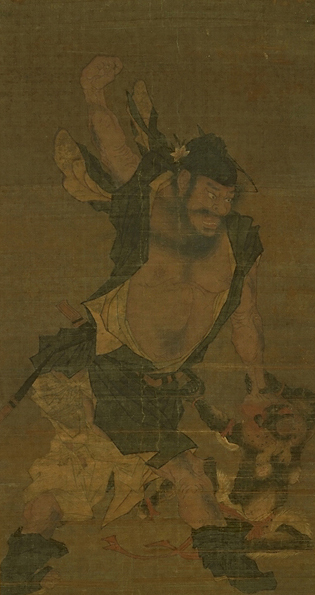
Zhong Kui subduing a demon, unknown artist, Yuan dynasty.

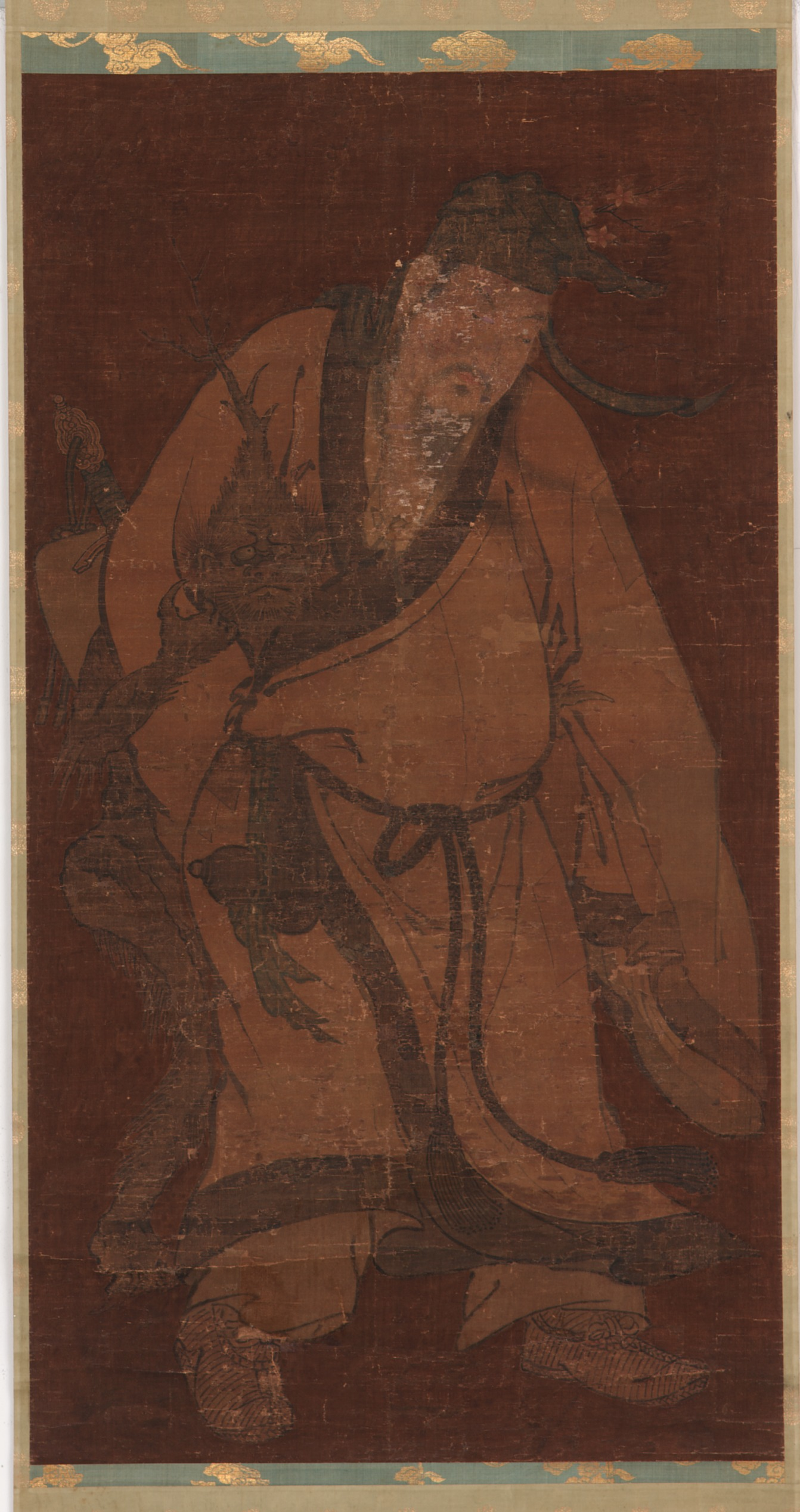
Lü Dongbin Subduing a Demon, unknown artist; formerly attributed to Li Gonglin, Ming dynasty.

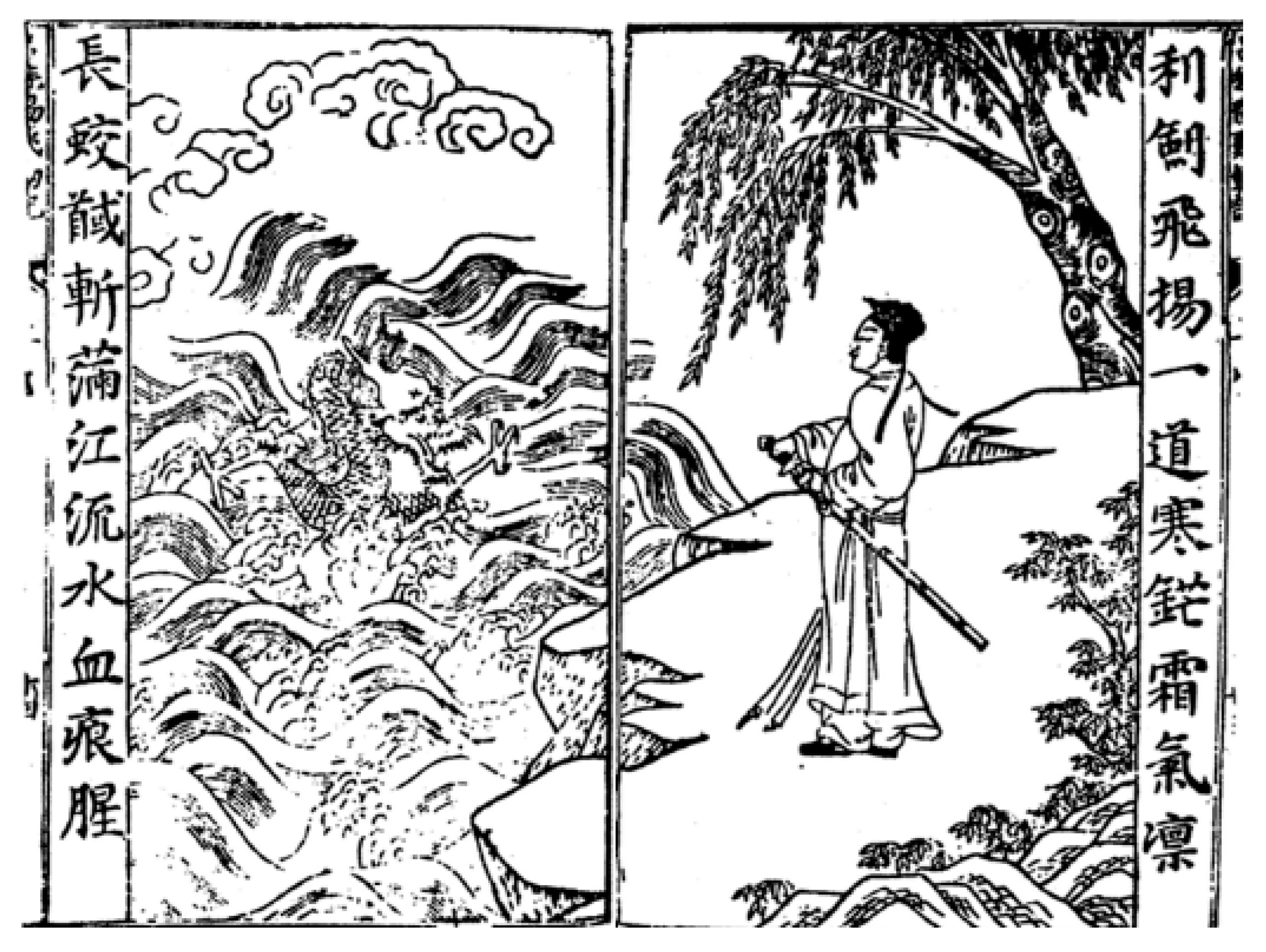
Woodblock print of Lü Dongbin confronting a jiaolong-dragon, from Deng Zhimo's The Flying Sword (飛劍記)

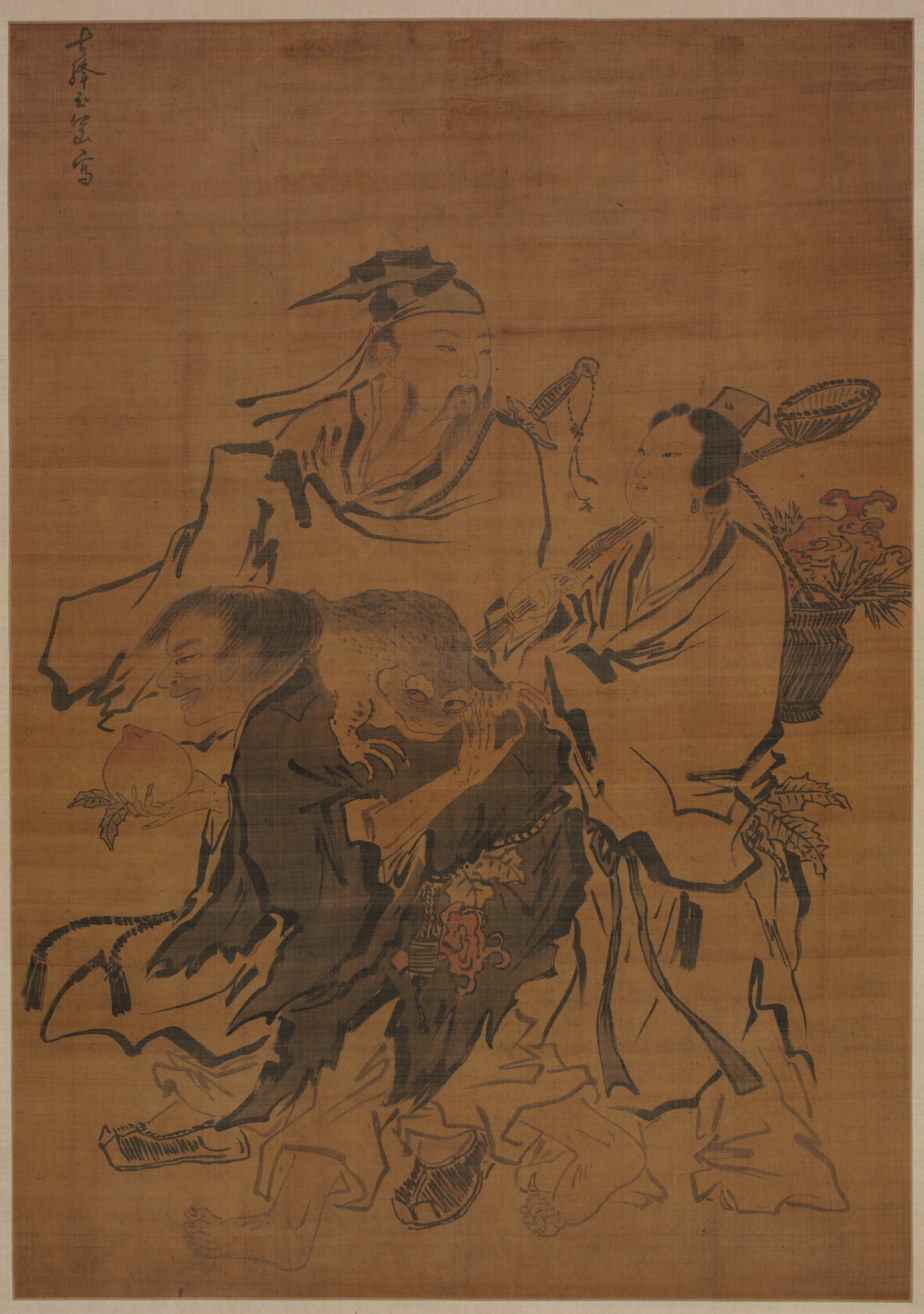
Three Immortals, unknown artist, Ming dynasty.

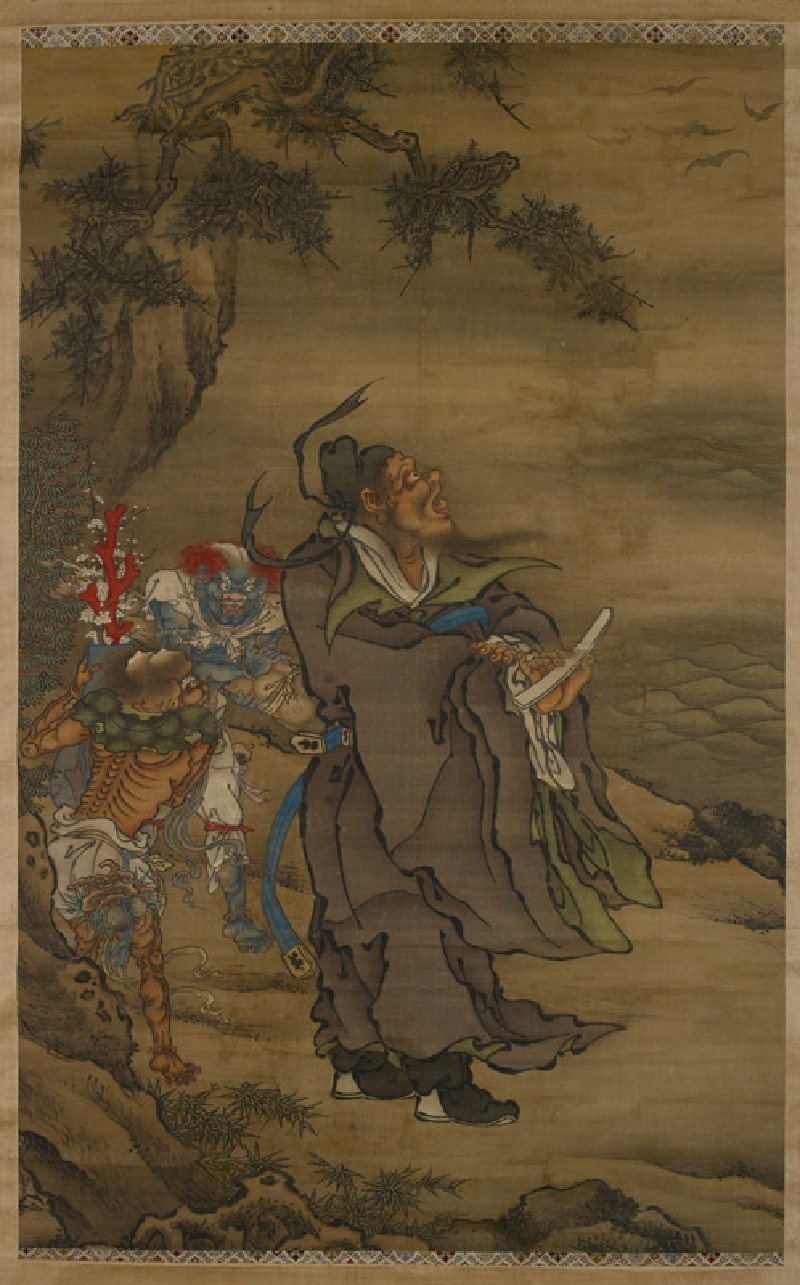
Zhong Kui the Demon Queller with Five Bats from the Ming dynasty.

Gathering of Immortals, by Zhang Chong, Ming dynasty.

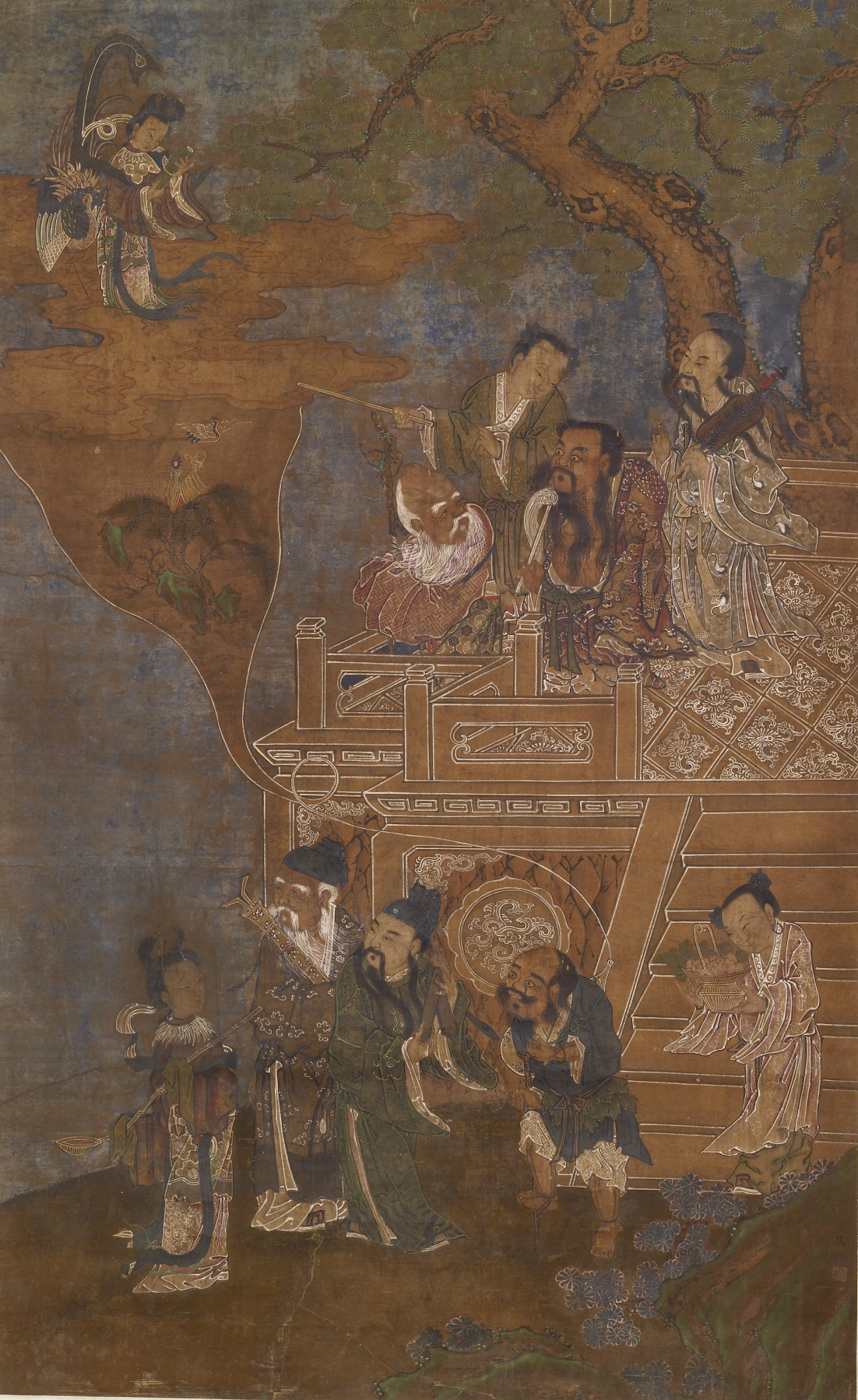
Eight Immortals, unknown artist.

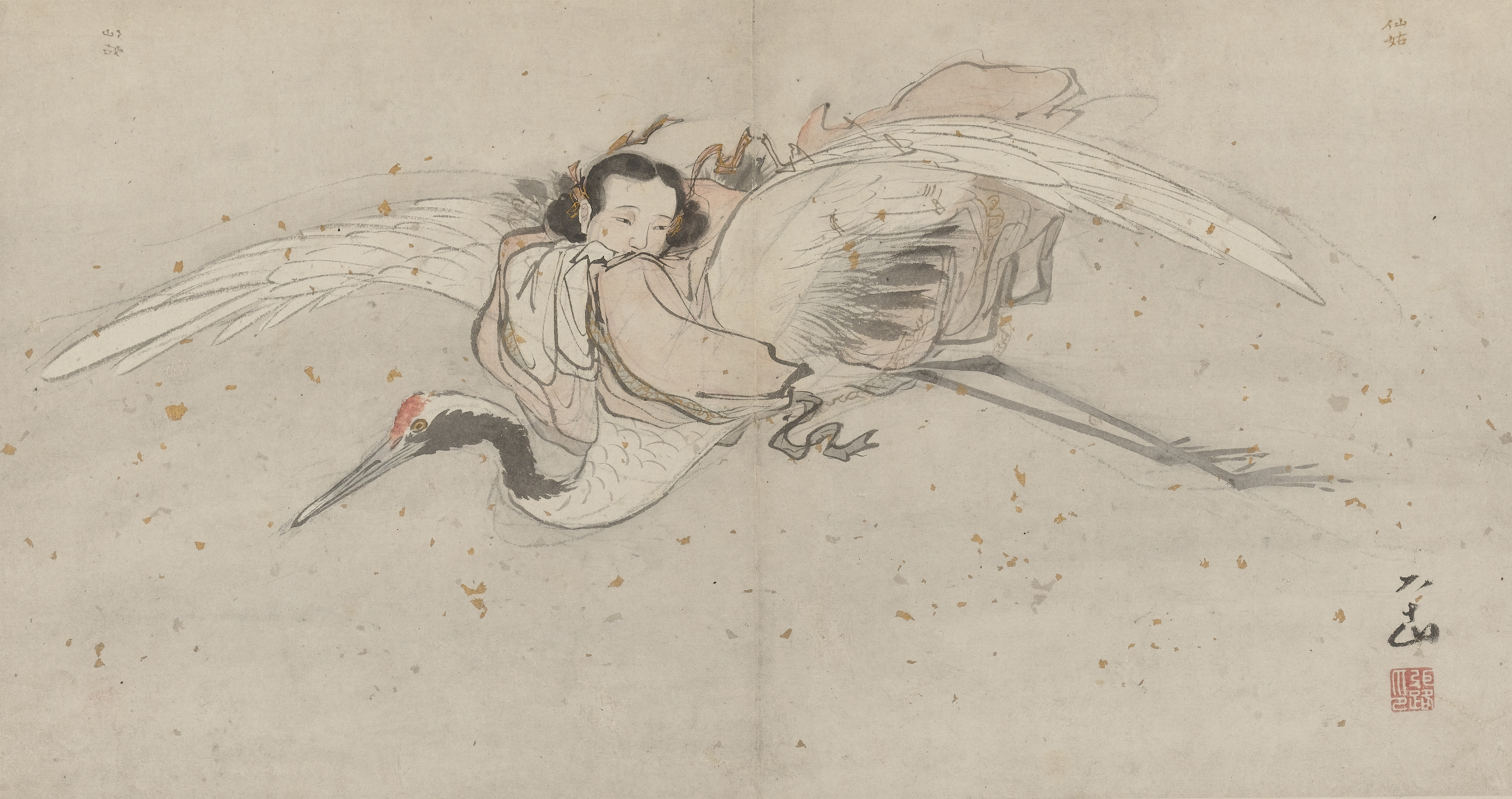
The Daoist Immortal He Xiangu by Zhang Lu, early 16th century, Ming dynasty.

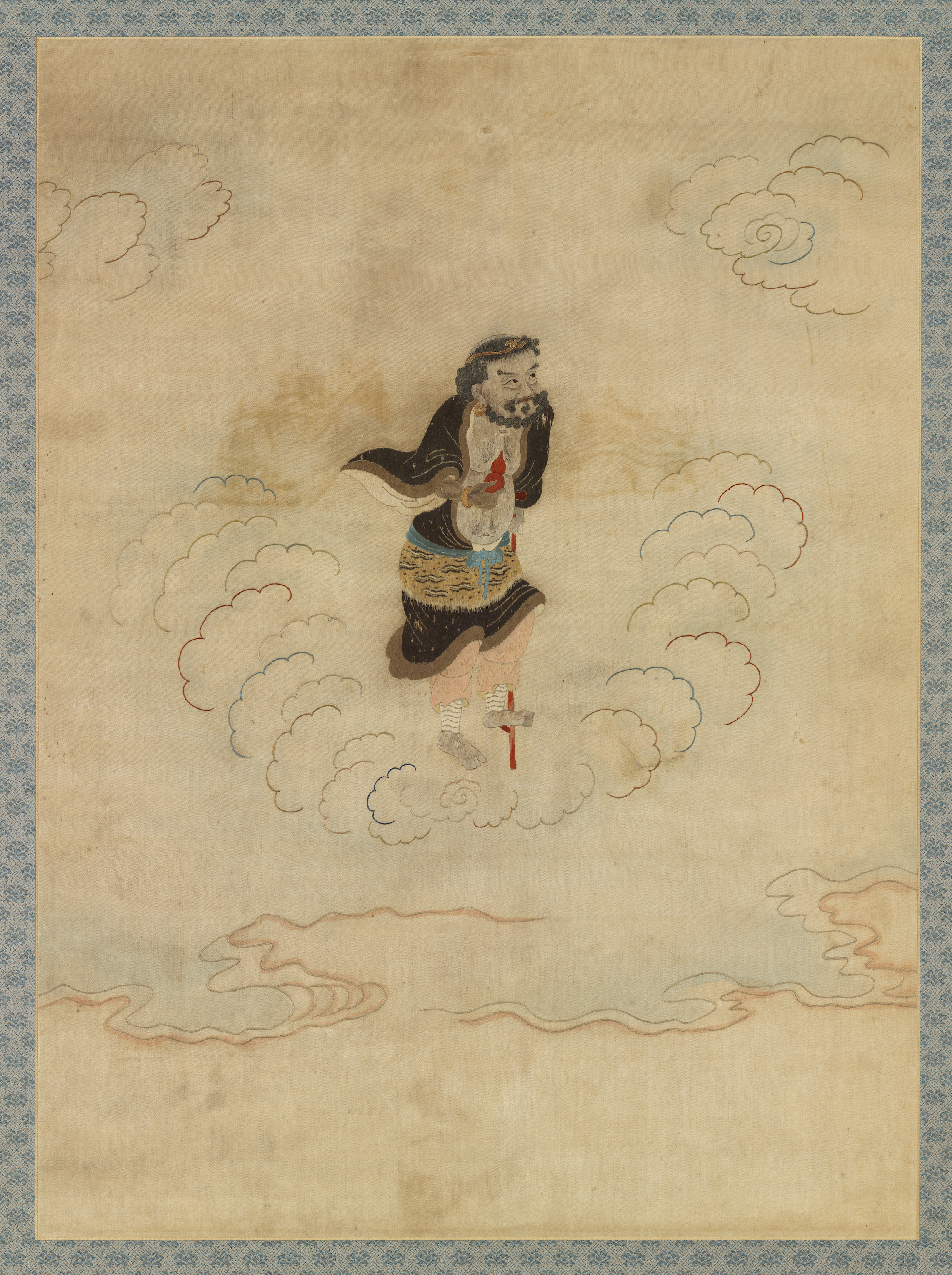
Ming dynasty painting of Li Tieguai

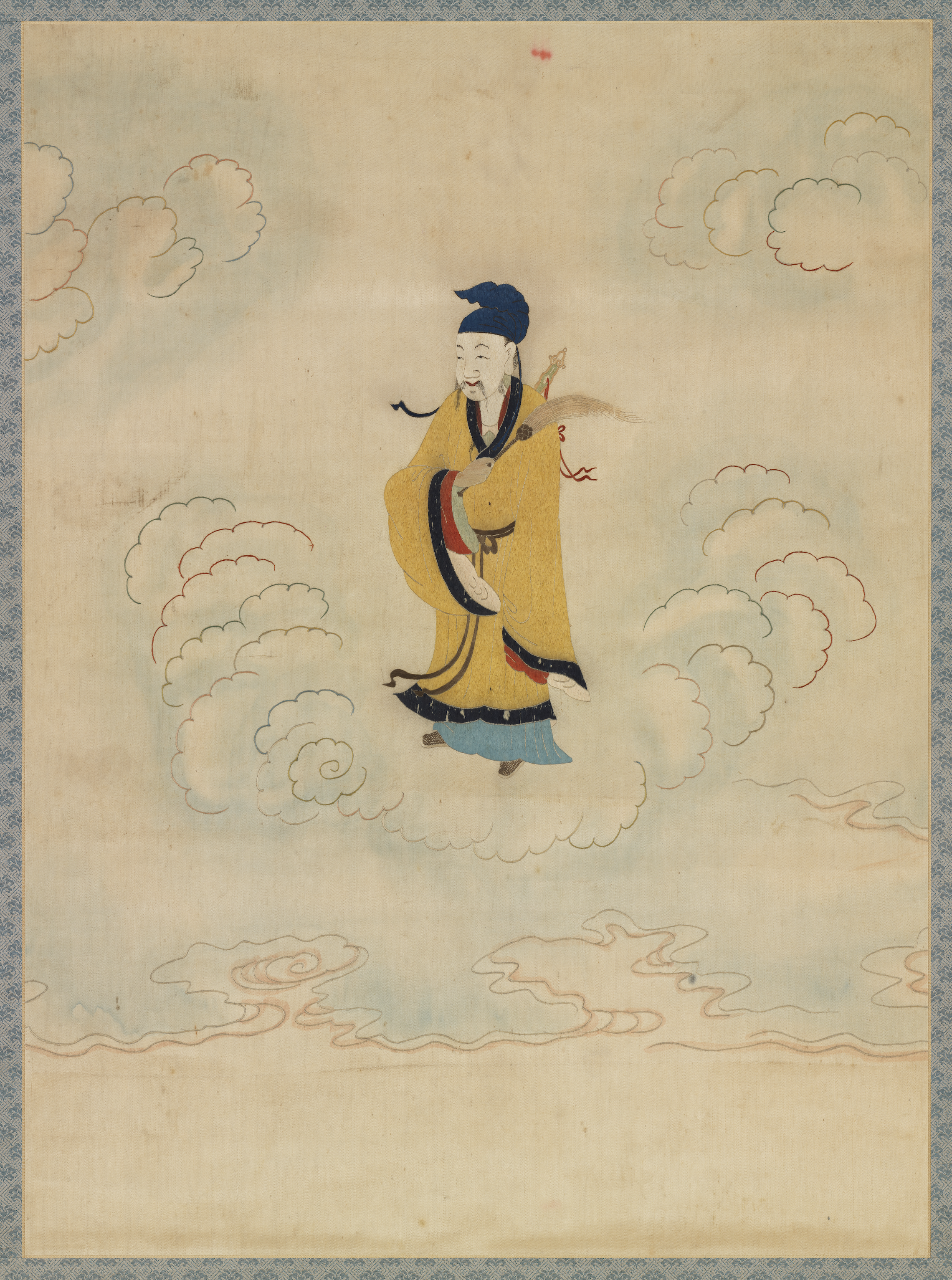
Ming dynasty painting of Lü Dongbin

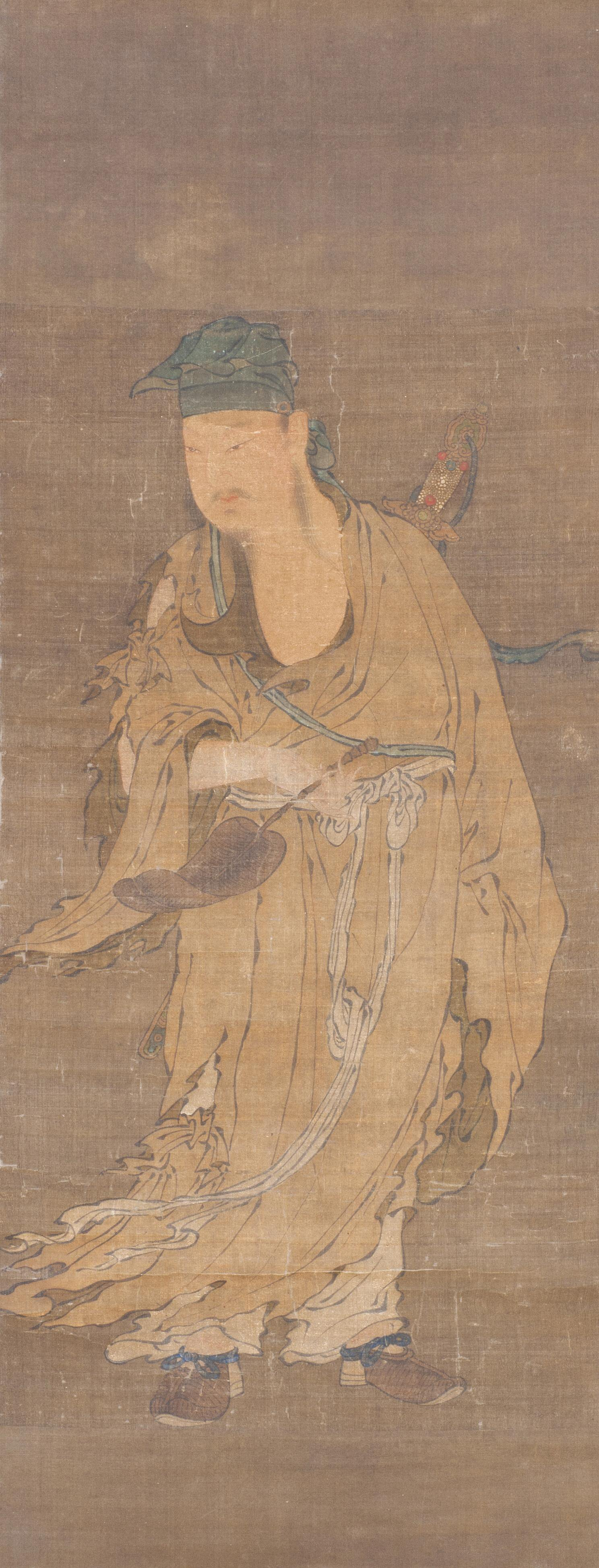
The Daoist Immortal Lü Dongbin, a painting from the Ming dynasty

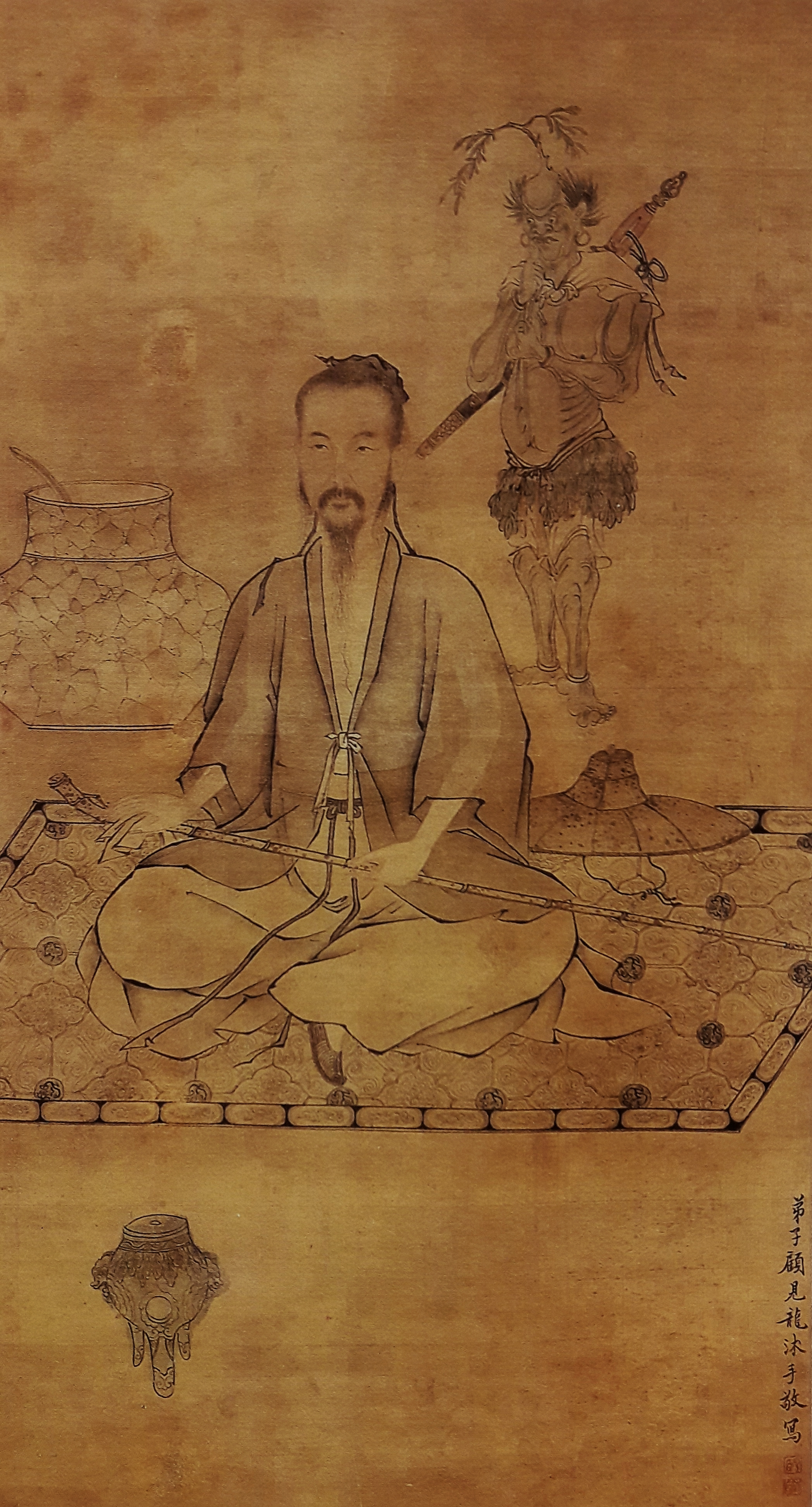
Immortal Lü Dongbin and Willow Deity, by Gu Jianlong, Ming dynasty

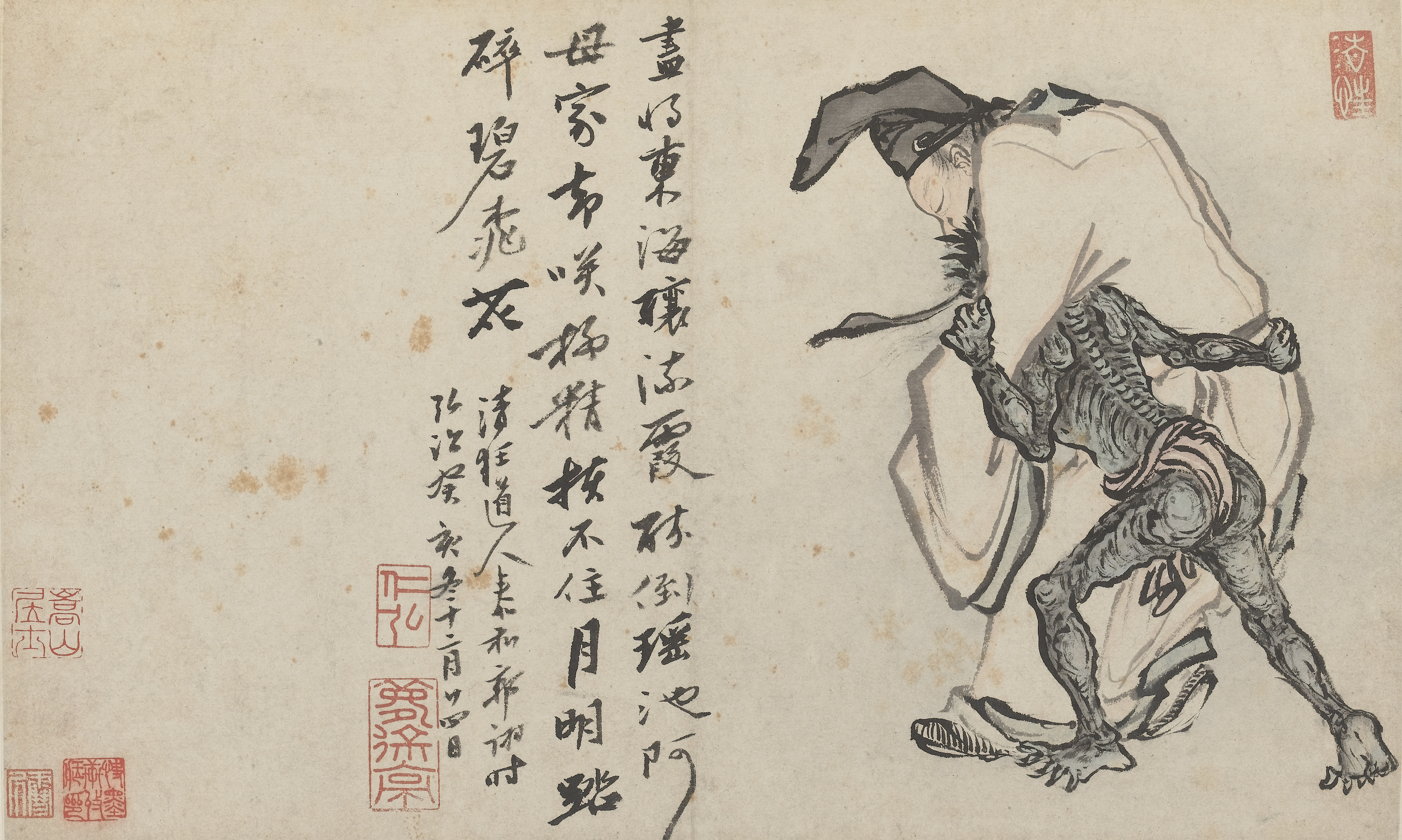
Drunken Immortal supported and escorted by a demon, by Guo Xu, Ming dynasty.

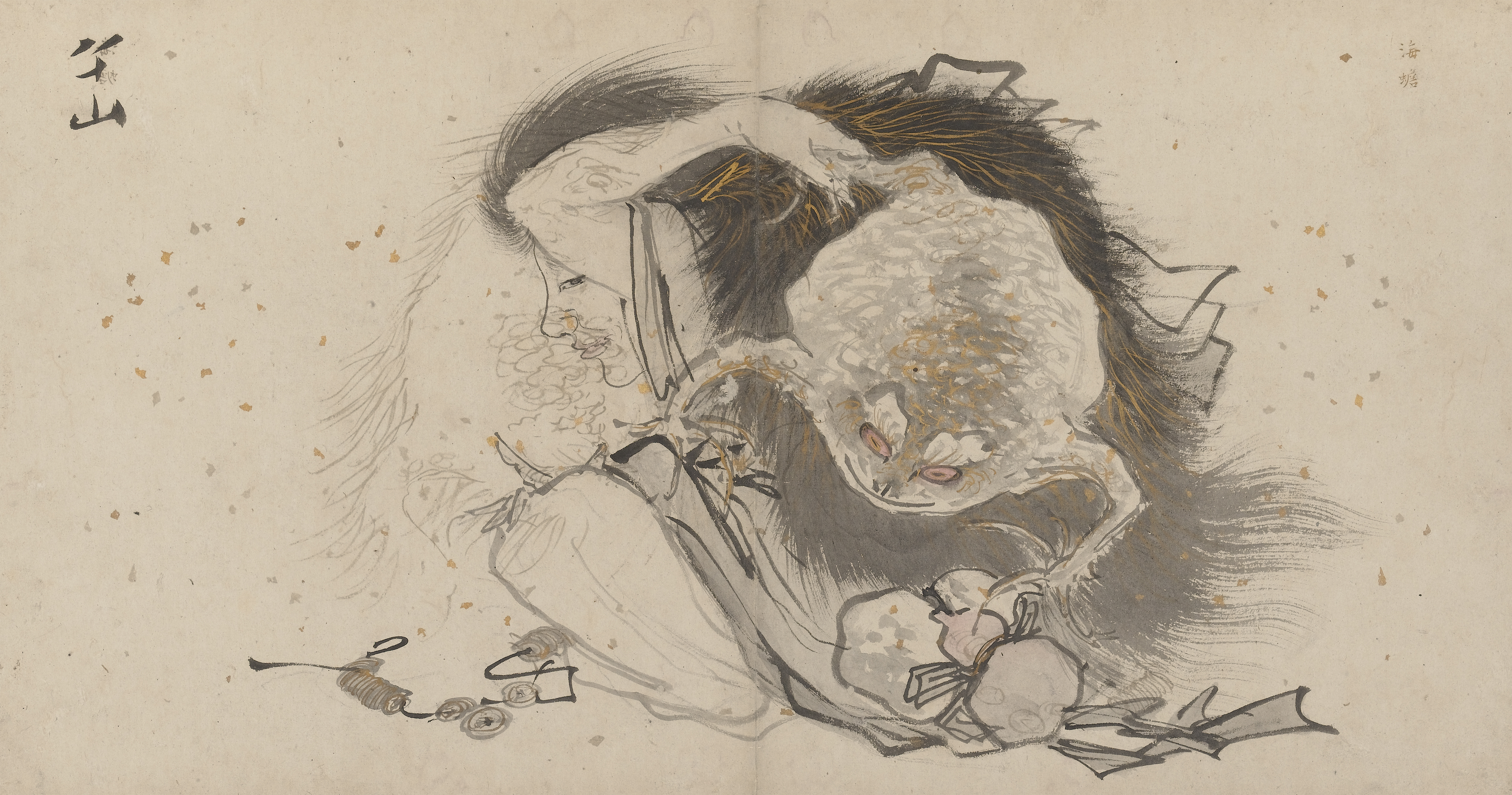
Liu Haichan with his Money Toad and string of cash, by Zhang Lu, early 16th century, Ming dynasty.

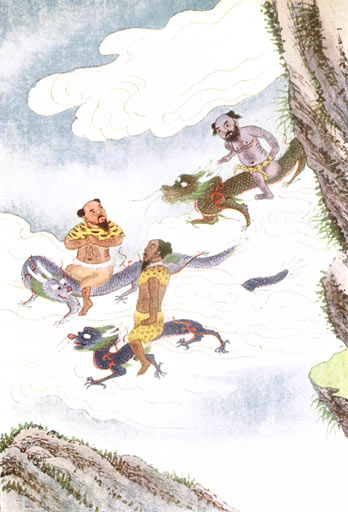
Xian riding dragons

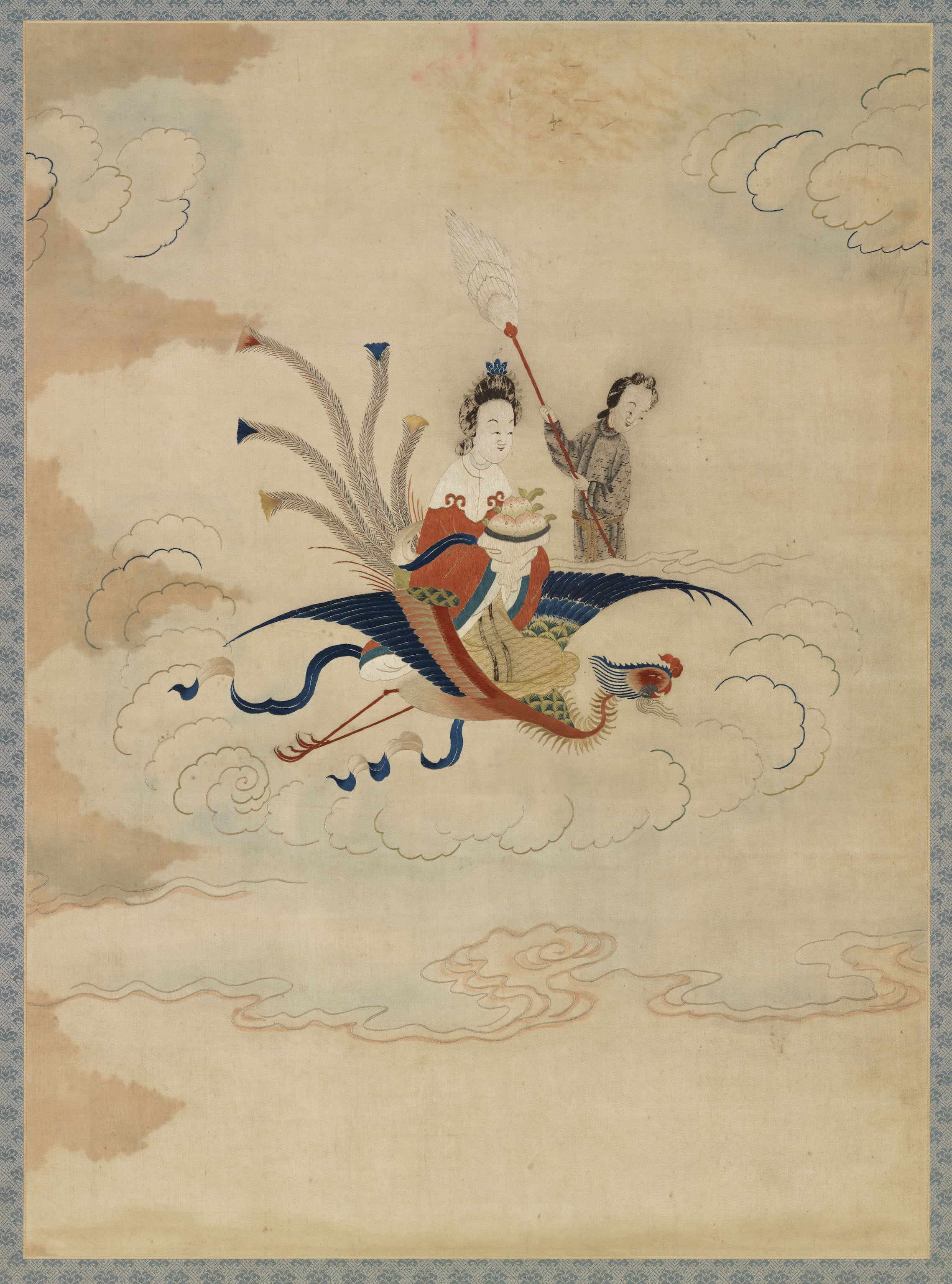
Xiwangmu riding on a phoenix.

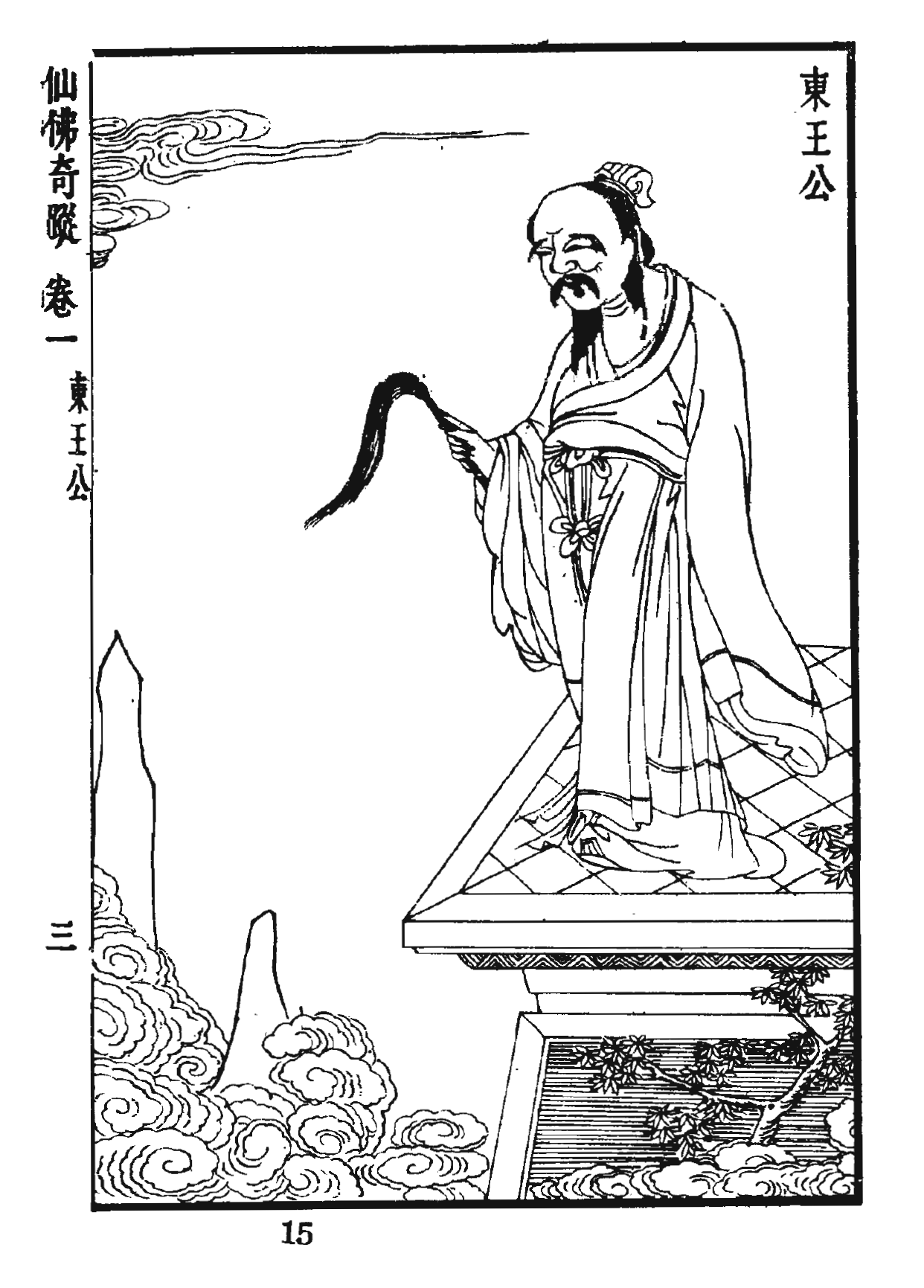
King Father of the East (東王公)

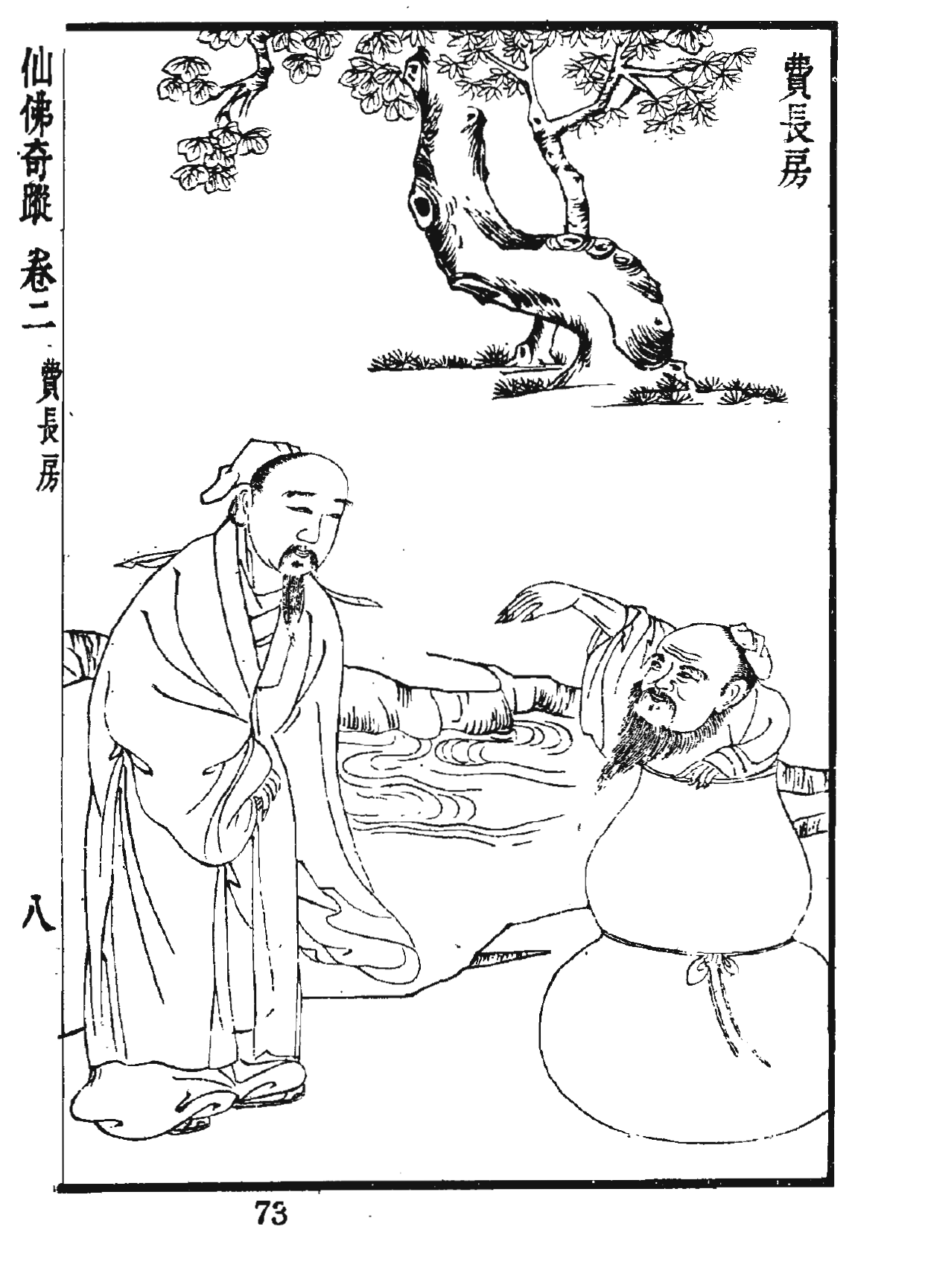
Fei Changfang (费长房).

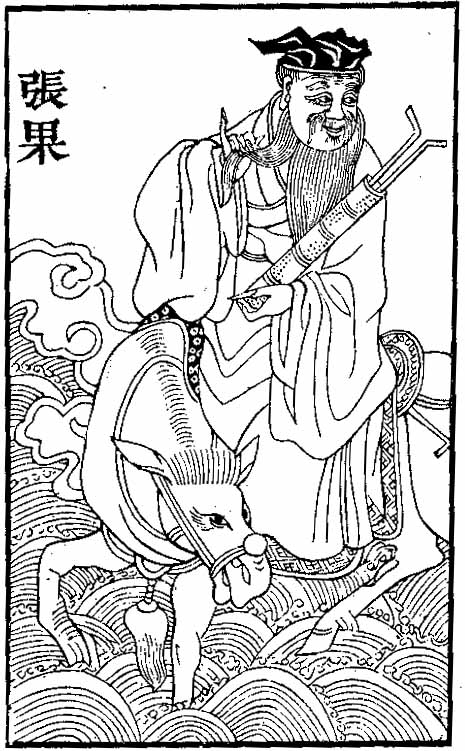
Zhang Guolao

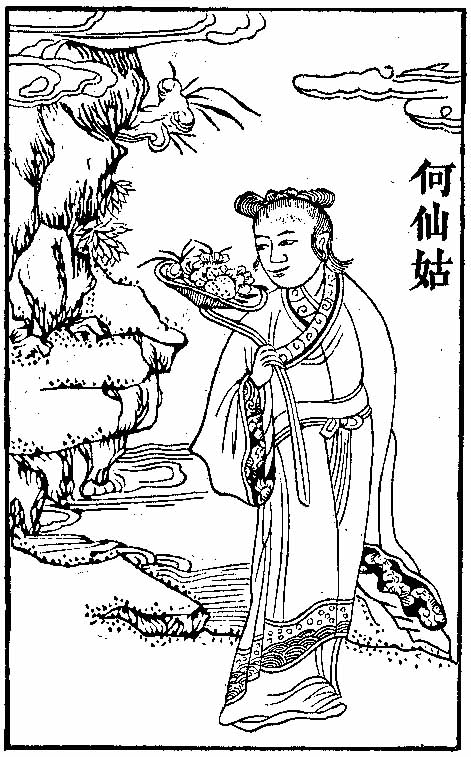
He Xiangu

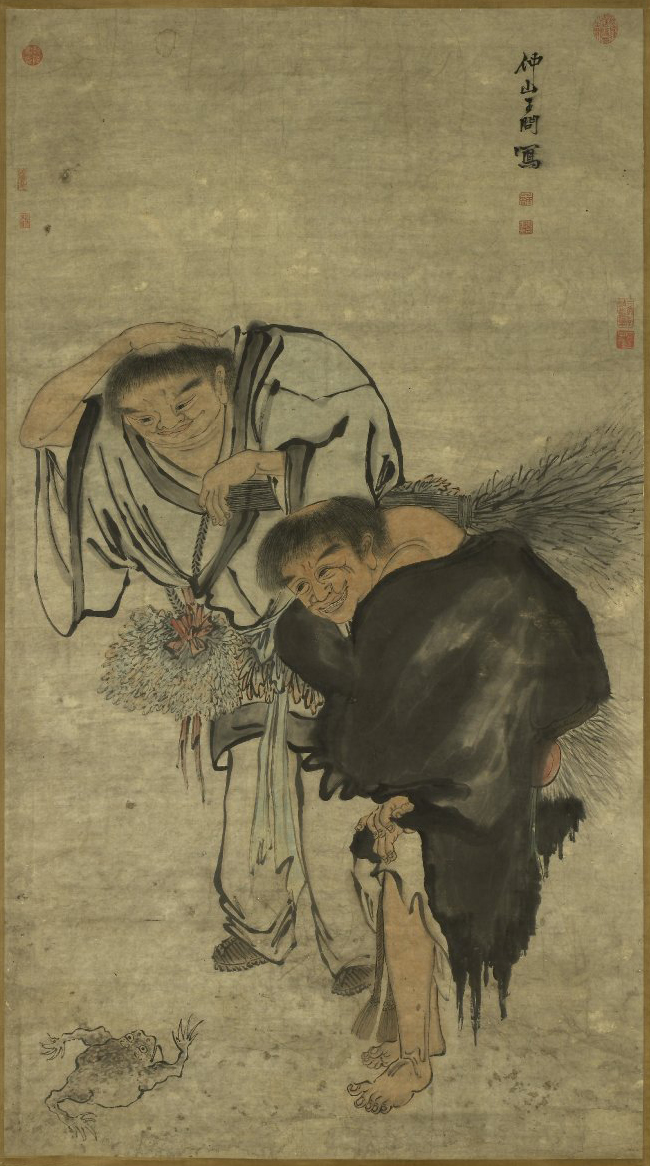
He-He Er Xian as painted by Wang Wen, Ming dynasty

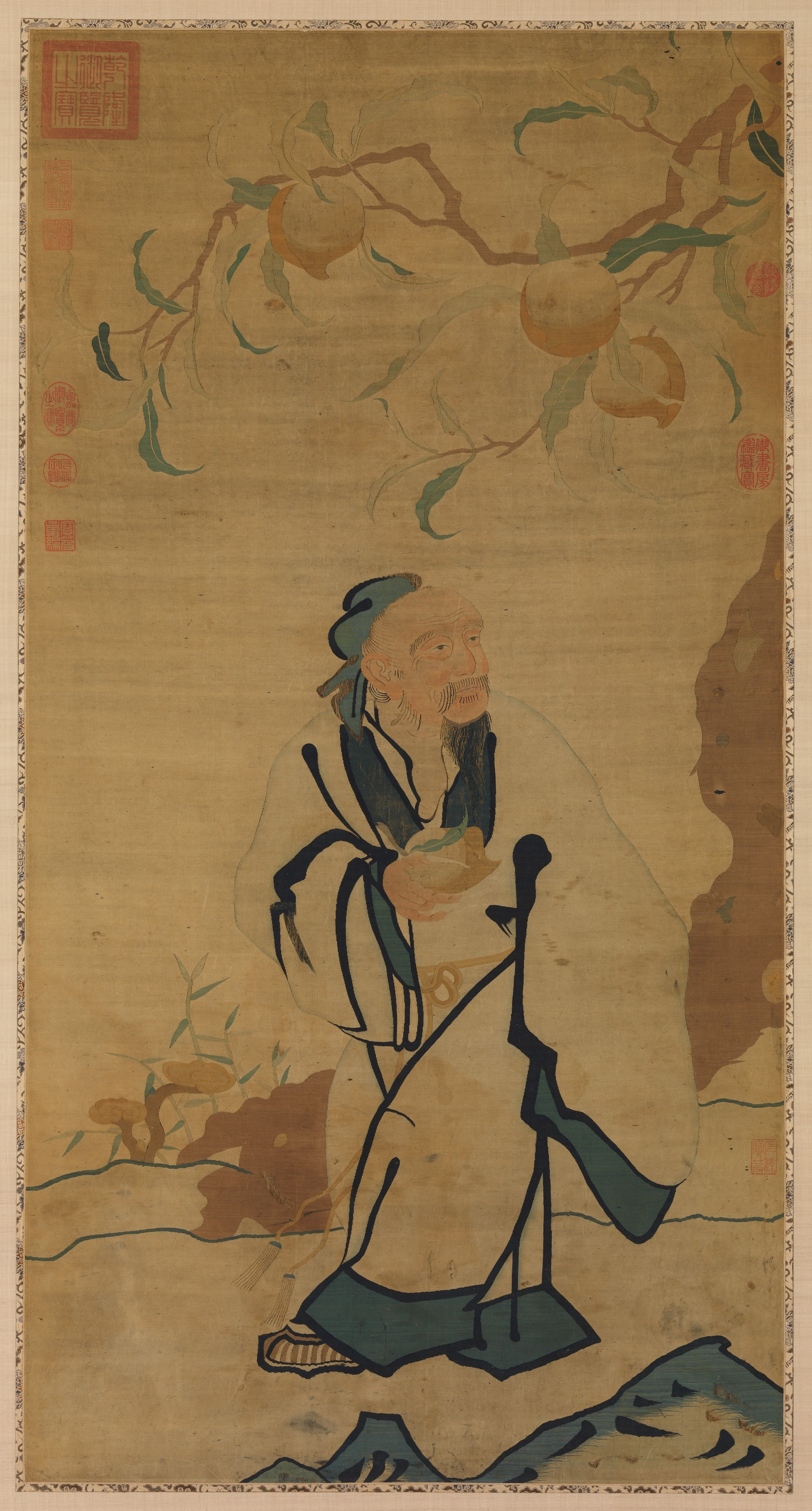
Silk tapestry of Dongfang Shuo stealing a peach of immortality, Ming dynasty

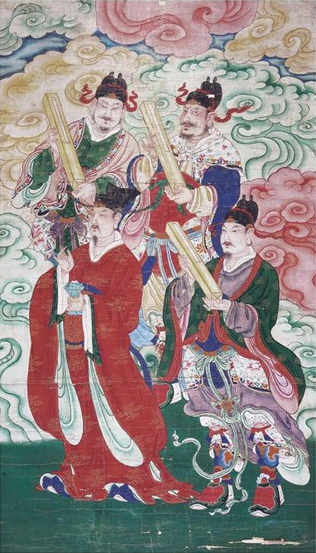
Ming dynasty Shuilu ritual painting of Four Time Guardians (四值功曹)

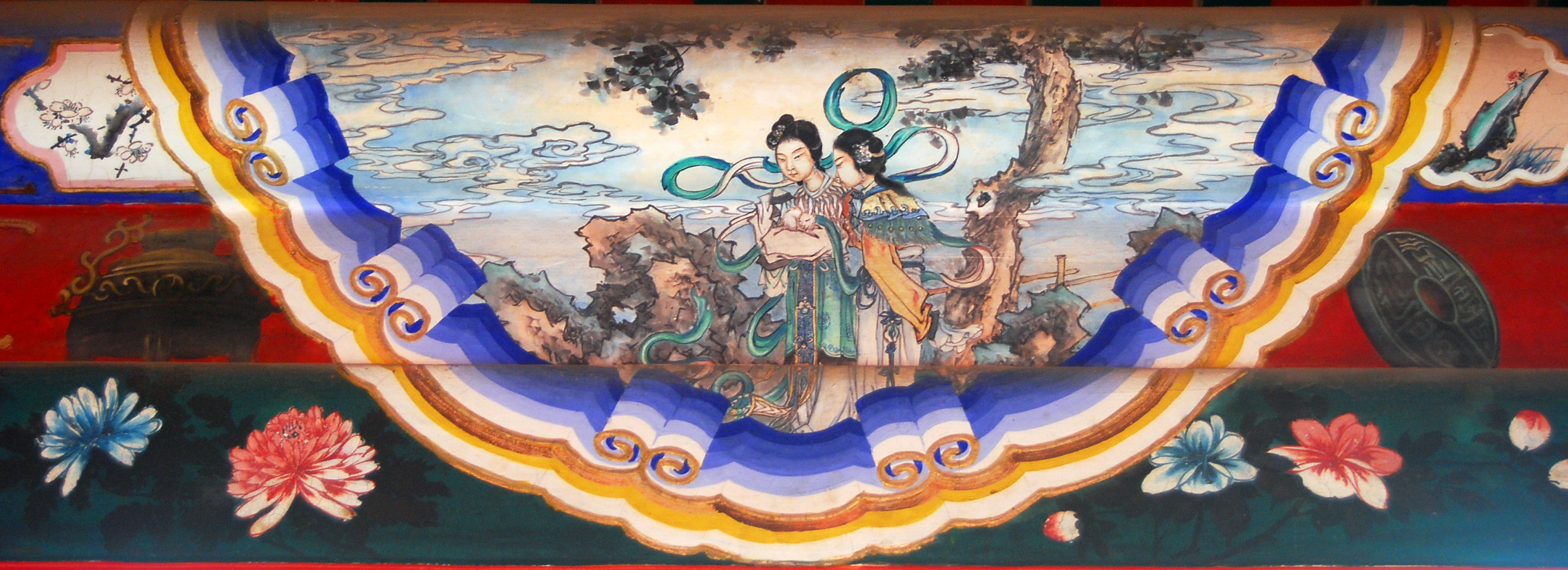
Chang'e on caihua mural.

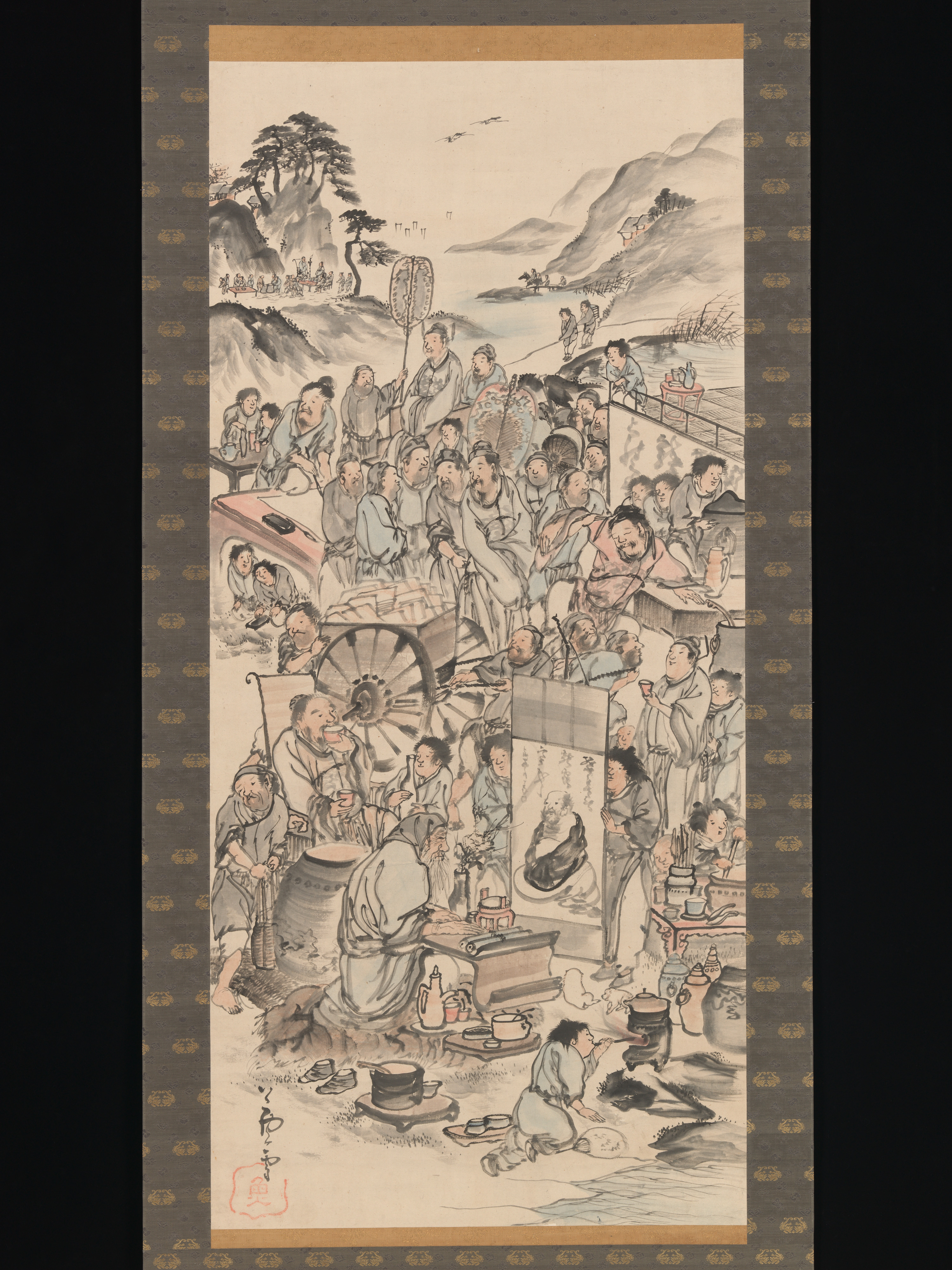
Drinking Festival of the Eight Immortals, late 18th century, Japan.

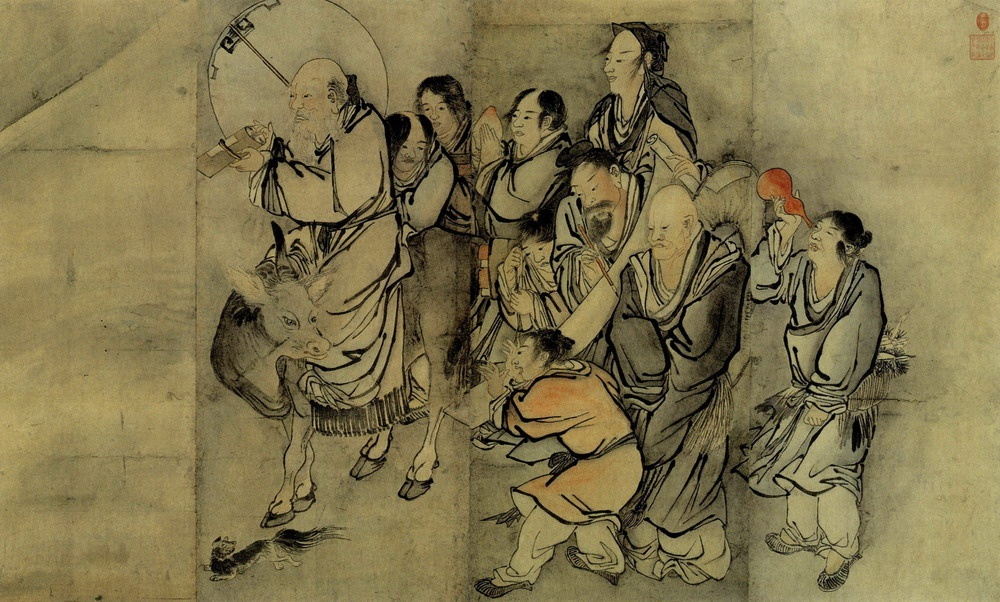
Joseon painting of Taoist Immortals by Kim Hong-do.

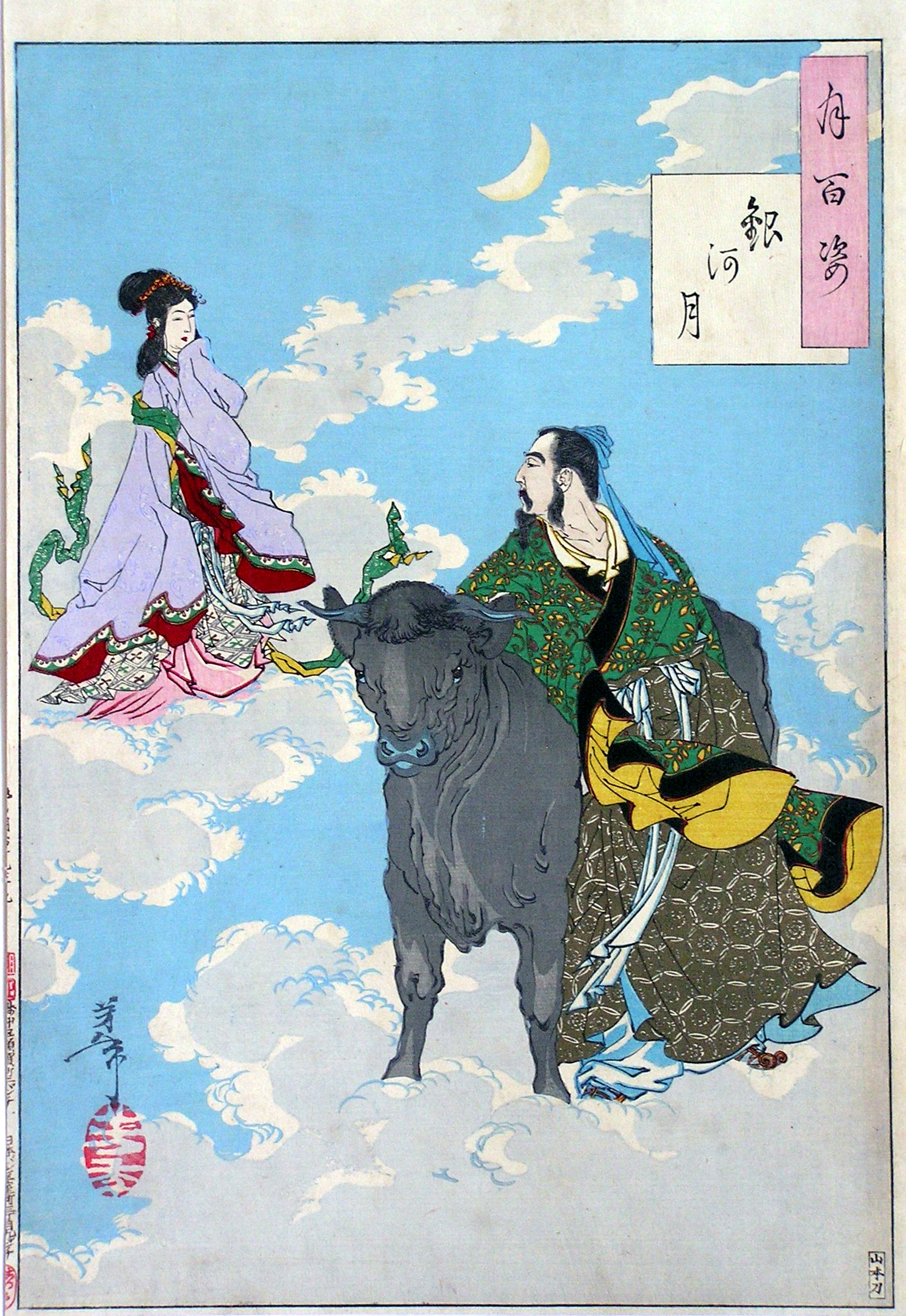
Zhinü and Niulang, by the Japanese painter Tsukioka Yoshitoshi.

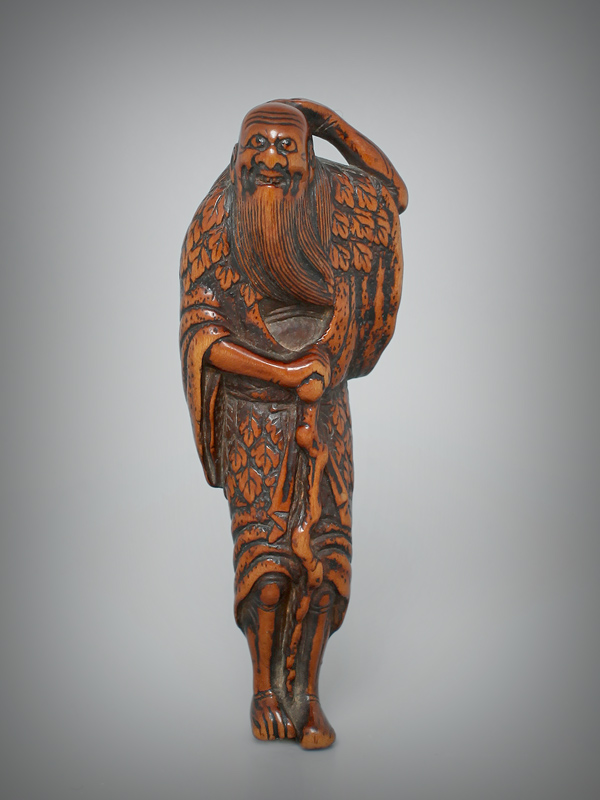
Sennin with his staff, carver Jobun, 18th century, wood, height 80 mm

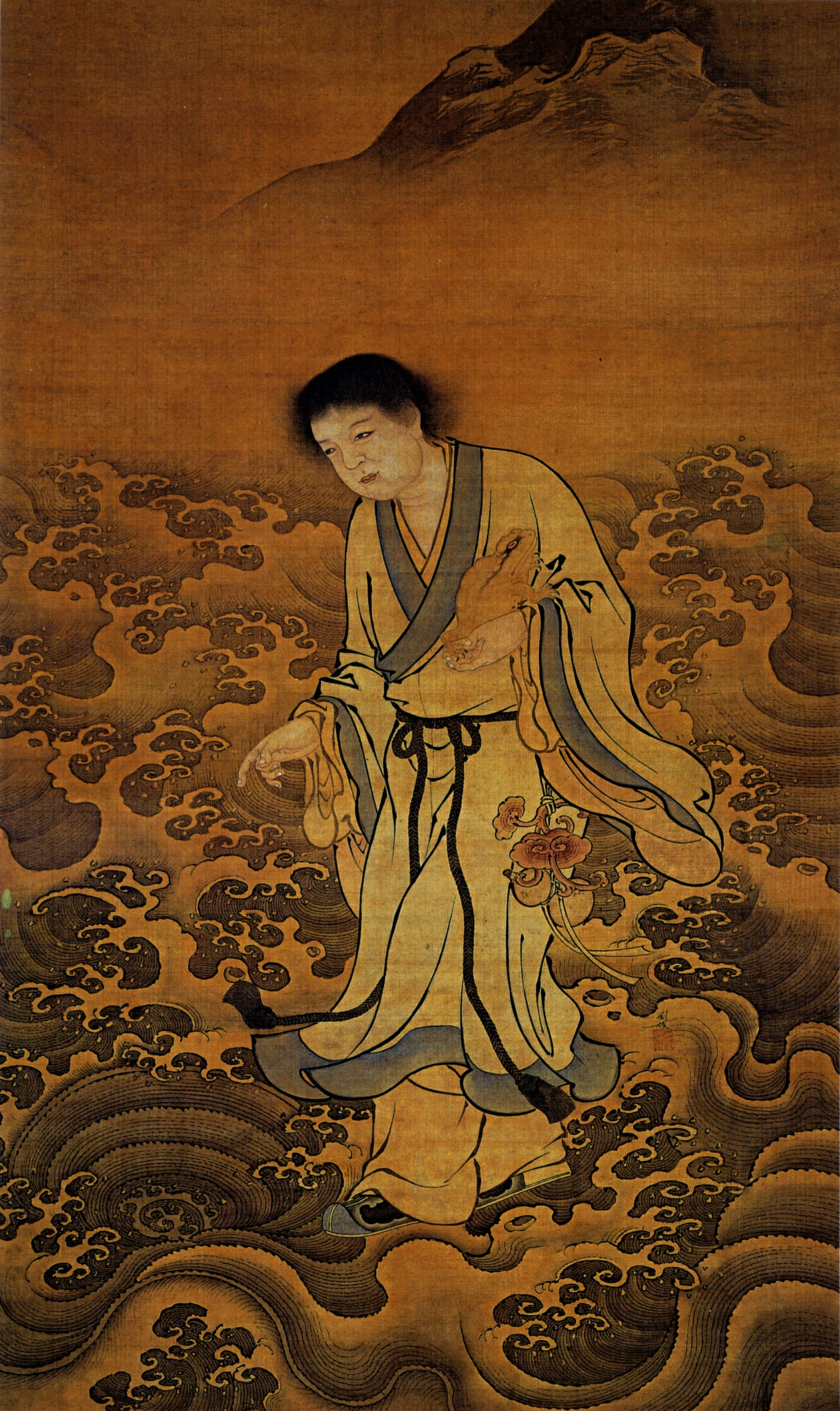
Liu Hai carrying a Chan Chu (three legged toad)

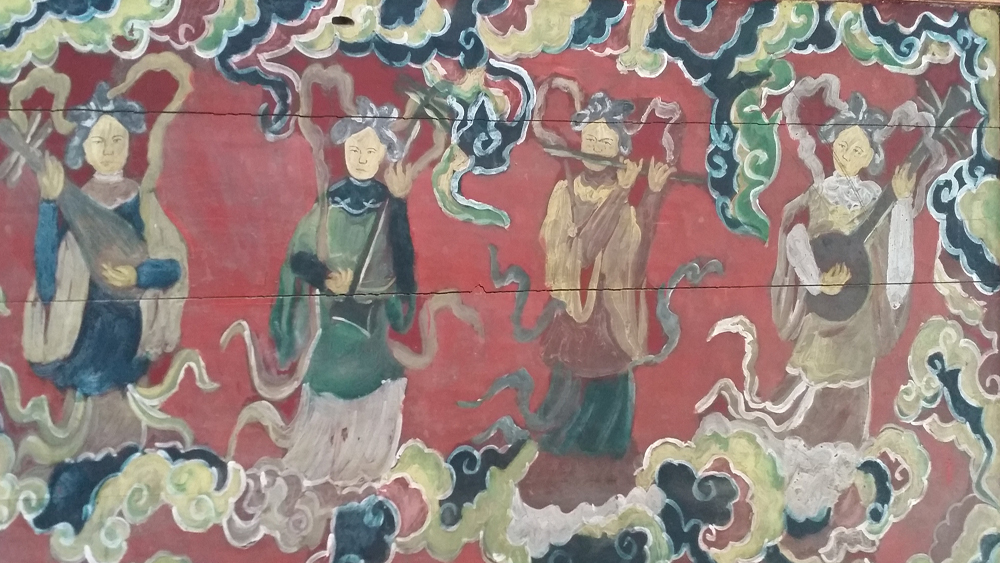
Lacquer painting of the four tiên (immortals), 16th century, Vietnam

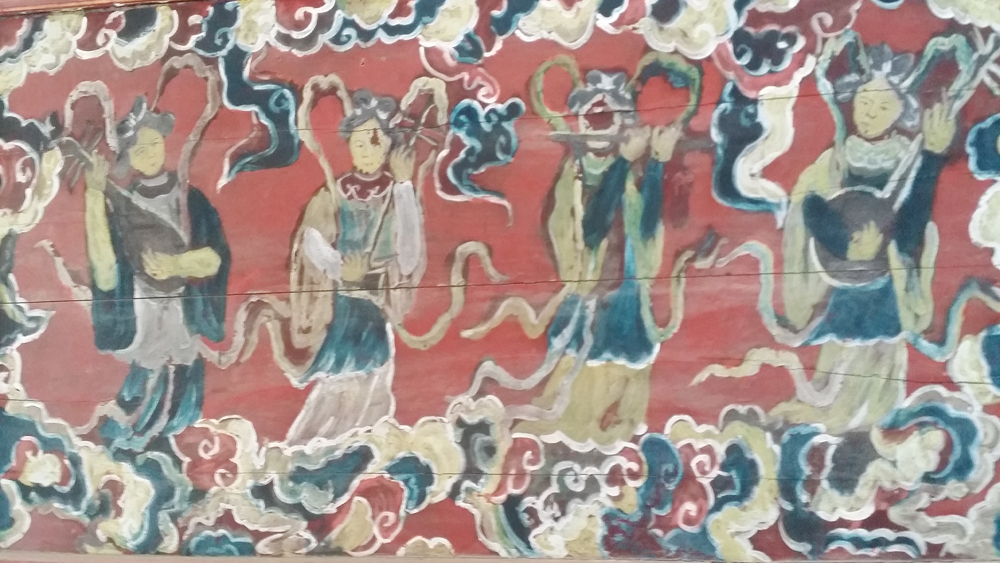
Lacquer painting of the four tiên (immortals), 16th century, Vietnam

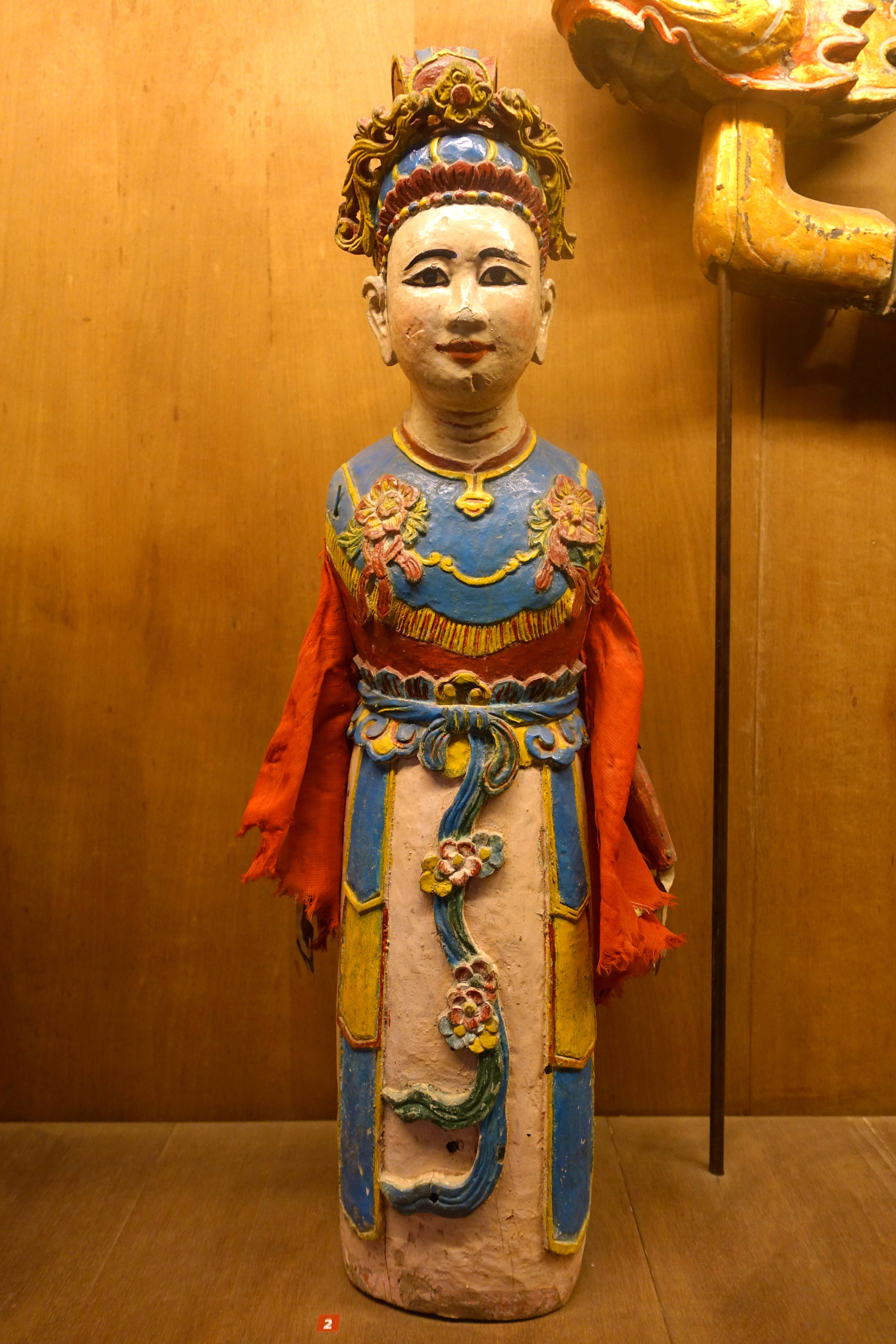
Tiên (Immortal) water puppet at Vietnam Museum of Ethnology – Hanoi

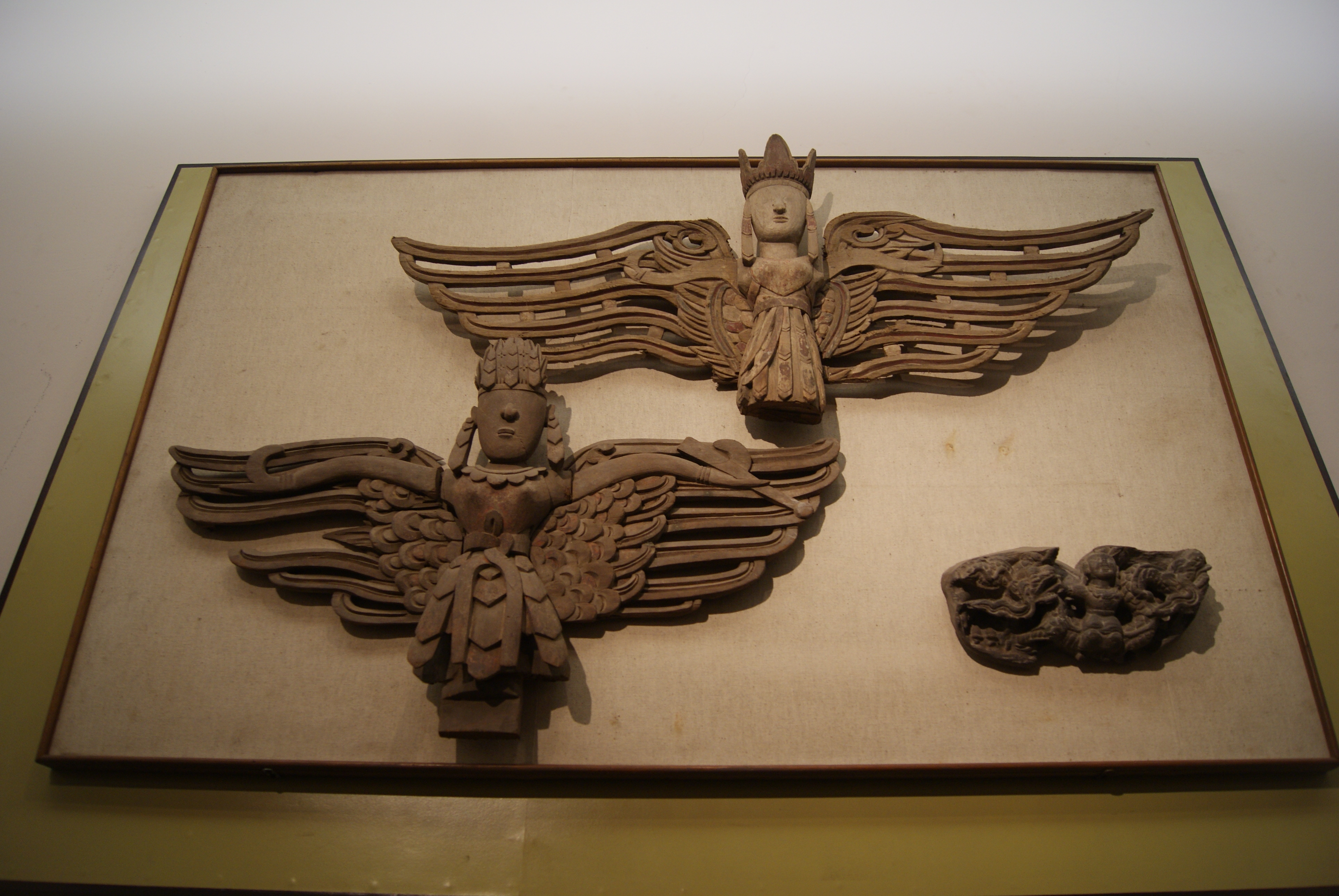
Statues of Tiên (Immortal), and a Tiên (Immortal) riding a dragon (17th century), Vietnam National Museum of Fine Arts, Hanoi

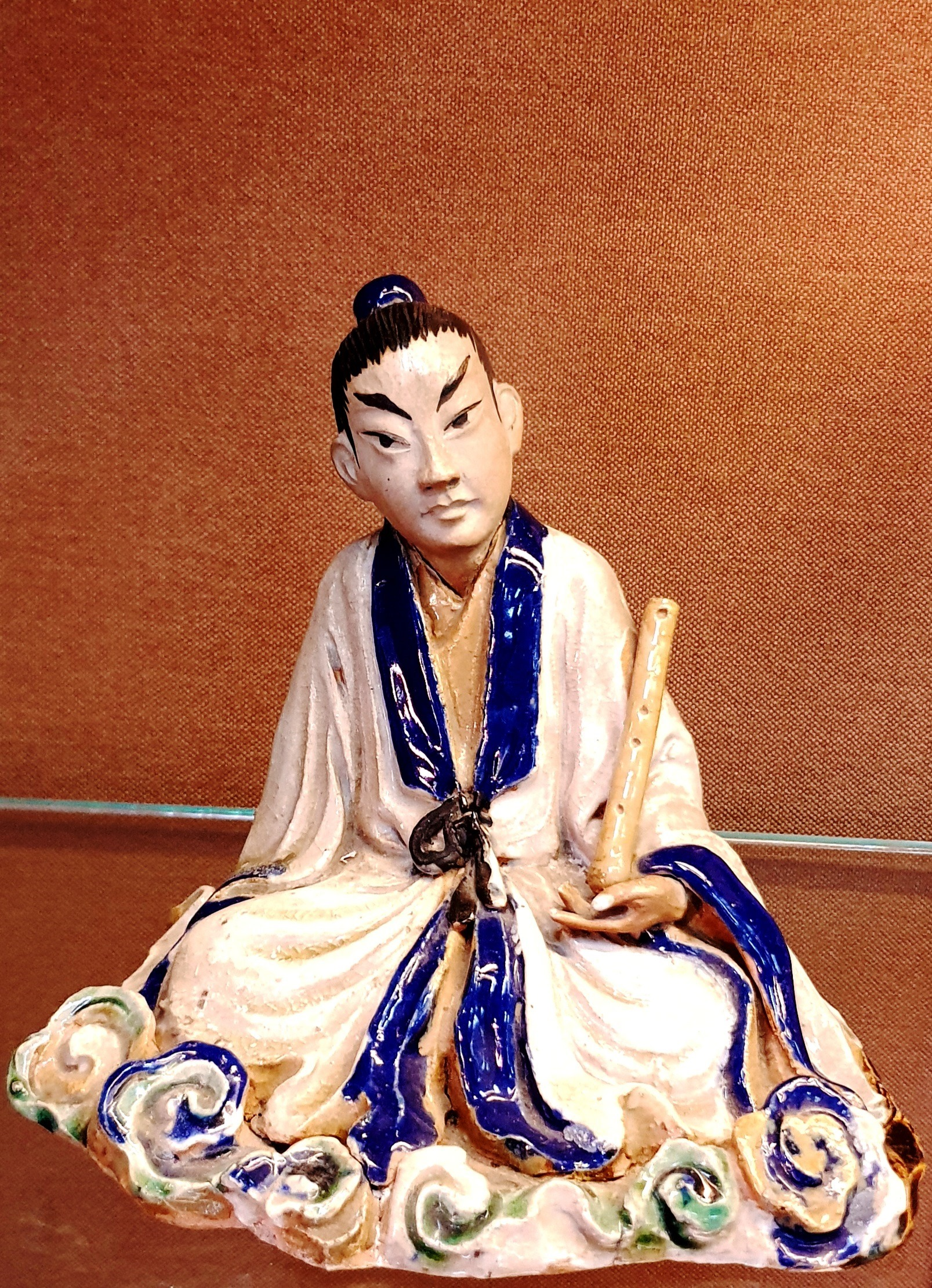
Ceramic statue of Tiên (Immortal) in a museum in Vietnam

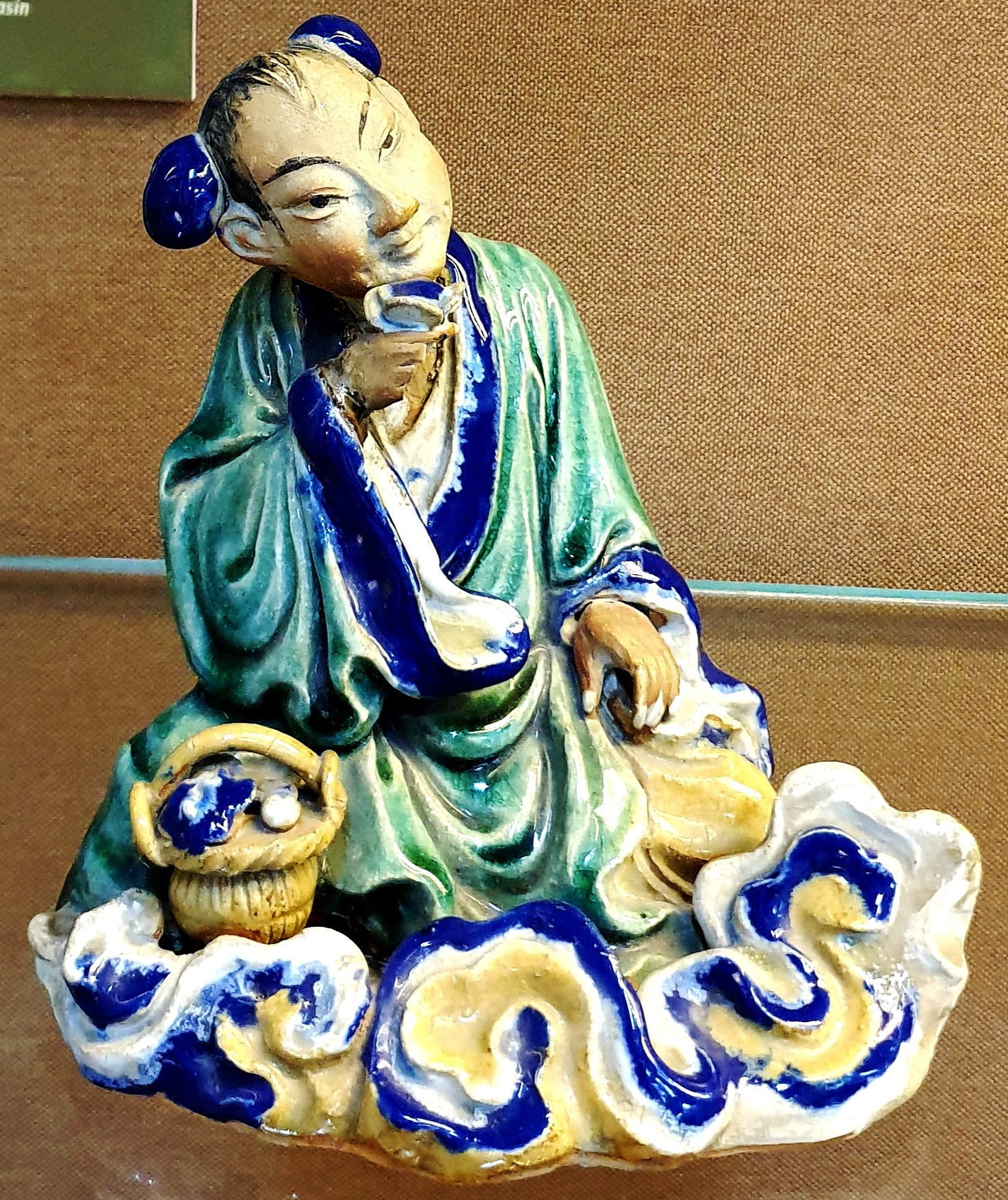
Ceramic statue of Tiên (Immortal) in a museum in Vietnam

=== In popular culture ===
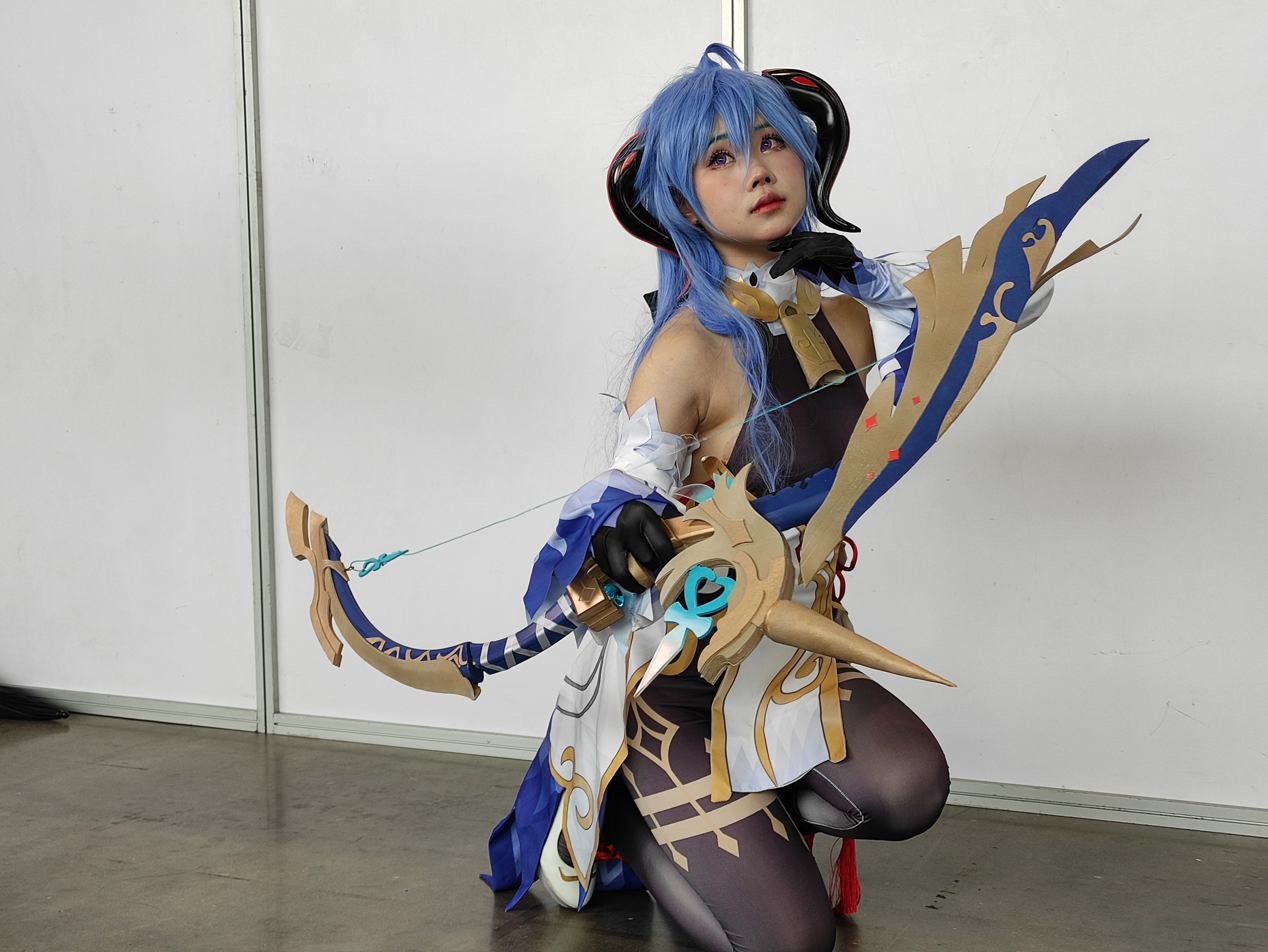
Cosplay of Ganyu from Genshin Impact, who was based on the female xian (called "adepti" in the game) according to its creators.

Xian are common characters in Chinese fantasy works. There is a genre called xianxia, which is part of a larger genre called cultivation fantasy or cultivation, named after the beings where characters usually seek to become xian in a fantasy world that is either militaristic or fraught with other dangers.

==== Example works ====
- The Legend of Sword and Fairy, video game based on xianxia fiction.
- Lotus Lantern, an animated film based on the story of The Magic Lotus Lantern.
- Heaven Official's Blessing features a story based on the concept of xian and spiritual worship and cultivation.
- Xuanyuan Sword, video game based on xianxia fiction.
- Zu Warriors from the Magic Mountain, a 1983 Hong Kong supernatural wuxia fantasy film directed by Tsui Hark and based on the 1932 xianxia novel Legend of the Swordsmen of the Mountains of Shu by Huanzhulouzhu.

== See also ==
- Shen (Chinese religion)
- Zhenren
- Eight Immortals
- Eight Immortals from Sichuan
- Fu Lu Shou
- Old Man of the South Pole
- Magu
- Xi Wangmu (Queen Mother of the West)
- Temples of the Five Immortals in China:
  - In Shiyan (Hubei)
  - In Guangzhou
- Kunlun Mountain in mythology
- Peaches of Immortality
- Xianxia (genre)
- Sansin
- Shijie (Taoism), a transformation to a Xian.
- Yama-no-Kami
- Rishi
- Weizza
- Woodwose
- Yaoguai, a type of ghost that was sometimes thought to be synonymous with the spirits of Taoist immortals
- Zhiguai xiaoshuo, folklore stories where xian are sometimes found
