= The Legend of Sword and Fairy 7 =

2021 video game

- Developer: Softstar
- Publishers: TW: Softstar; WW: eastasiasoft (PlayStation 4, PlayStation 5); WW: E-Home Entertainment (Xbox One, Xbox Series X/S)
- Director: Yao Zhuangxian
- Composers: Chen Zhiyi; Liu Nian; Liu Pei; Lu Nuoyuan; Luo Jiyi; Qiao Wei; Wang Ze; Wu Xinrui; Zeng Zhihao
- Series: The Legend of Sword and Fairy
- Engine: Unreal Engine 4
- Platforms: Microsoft Windows; PlayStation 4; PlayStation 5; Xbox One; Xbox Series X/S
- Release: Microsoft Windows: CHN: October 15, 2021; WW: October 22, 2021; PlayStation 4, PlayStation 5: WW: August 4, 2022; Xbox One, Xbox Series X/S: WW: November 3, 2022
- Genre: Action-adventure role-playing
- Mode: Single-player

The Legend of Sword and Fairy 7, (Note: simplified Chinese: 仙剑奇侠传七; traditional Chinese: 仙劍奇俠傳七; pinyin: Xiānjiàn Qíxiá Zhuàn Qī) also known as Sword and Fairy 7 (Note: (仙劍七)) or Chinese Paladin 7, is a xianxia/shenmo-themed fantasy action-adventure role-playing video game developed by Softstar Entertainment (Beijing) and China Mobile Games & Entertainment Group (CMGE). First released in October 2021, it is the ninth installment in The Legend of Sword and Fairy video game series, preceded by The Legend of Sword and Fairy 6 (2015). The story is set about 100 years after the events of The Legend of Sword and Fairy 2, with numerous homages to all previous games and some of the characters from the second, third, fourth and fifth game even making cameo appearances.

The game is the first in the series to abandon the fabled turn-based gameplay, instead using a real-time 3D hack & slash gameplay based on Unreal Engine 4. It is primarily made for the PC platform and is available for digital distribution on Steam. An English/Japanese-localized version was released for the PlayStation 4, PlayStation 5, Xbox One and Xbox Series X/S in 2022 under the name Sword and Fairy: Together Forever (Japanese: 仙剣奇侠伝―守り合い―).

== Development ==
On May 23, 2017, Yao Zhuangxian announced that the project was established as the successor of The Legend of Sword and Fairy 6. Public beta was released on February 2, 2021 for free. Some beta players were also invited to provide feedback.

Presale of boxed editions (Standard and Premium) started on July 28, both in mainland China and Taiwan.

On February 14, 2023, Softstar released the first DLC of the game named Dreamlike World (人间如梦), which is a sequel that completes the plot gap between the game's ending and its post-credit scene.

== Gameplay ==
Unlike the turn-based battle mechanics used by the previous games of the series, The Legend of Sword and Fairy 7 uses a 3D third-person in a semi-open world setting and a real-time hack and slash style of action gameplay with no pauses between exploration and combats. The game consists of multiple major locations, each being an open-world map with numerous sub-regions that the character can explore freely on foot, encountering and interacting with various NPCs, enemy mobs and treasure chests along the way. The player can also choose to "fly" and fast travel directly to another area (as the main protagonist has a bird fairy that typically serve as a mount) to save time, and flying is the only option to travel between major locations as there are no open-world maps between them. There is also an expandable mini-map that shows the locations of the main quest, side quests and various important facilities (such as retail shop/pharmacy, bladesmith, kitchen and viewing platform) on the map.

When encountering friendly NPCs, a dialogue mark will appear above their head with hints of the conversation content, and dubbed greetings and background conversations will play when the player gets nearby. Nearby hostile NPCs will have a target mark appear on them, allowing the player to prioritize and lock onto each individual enemy to initiate an attack at will. In combat, the player can alternate between light and heavy strikes to trigger different combos, quick time events or teamed synergistic attacks, use ranged special attacks (which cost magic points and require cooldowns), or charge up a powerful strike for maximum damage. When using a team of protagonists, the player can switch readily among team members, and the enemies and boss will often prioritize attacking the character the player is controlling. Each enemy defeat will grant experience points and spoil items to the characters, allowing level-ups and acquisition of new skills.

There are numerous mini-games in the game, mainly a card game called "Journey of Heaven and Earth" (天地游) and a platform game called "Leaf Fairy Jump" (叶灵纵), which allow the player to collect trading cards and unlock a hidden fairy servant, as well as a plot-related snowboarding obstacle course game, a stealth game and a bamboo pole dancing game. The game has a unique "Cooking Mode", which allows the player to use obtained recipes and ingredients to create special dishes with beverages (whenever there is a kitchen or stove nearby on the map) that can provide significant time-limited healing, power-ups and buffs for the entire team. There is also a "Photo Mode" that allows the player to aerially tour the map and capture screenshots from any viewing angle.

== Plot ==
Xiu Wu, a deity warrior tasked to hunt down the fugitive leader of the celestial rebel group Heavenly Demons, infiltrates the Demon Realm but was detected and attacked by Garuda soldiers. Fighting off waves after waves of pursuers, Xiu Wu concludes the mission is a failure and decides to retreat but does not have enough spirit energy remaining to activate his magical Chunzi Sword and open a portal back to the Deity Realm. After managing to escape to the Yanbo Spring, one of Shennong's Nine Springs and a forbidden area to the demon tribes, he was intercepted by the demon lord Chonglou, who critically wounds and knocks him off a cliff towards the magma below. However, Chonglou decides not to really kill Xiu Wu and uses the dropped Chunzi Sword to open a portal that allowed him to fall through to the Human Realm.

Meanwhile, in the Human Realm, a young lady-warrior named Yue Qingshu manages to outrun Xiqu, a violent, gigantic bison-like supernatural beast that has threatened the locals for years. On the way back to Mingshu School, her own spiritual cultivation sect, Qingshu discovers a mysterious fruit among the woods and is mesmerized by its spiritual energy into making a light bite before stopping herself. She then sees a young boy being abducted by an eagle, decides to intervene and successfully saves the boy in an aerial pursuit using her fairy servant bird Qiaoling. The boy, Ziqiu, turns out to be a chosen "divine child" secretly kept under guard by the neighboring Tianshi School, a bitter rival of Mingshu School. Although Qingshu wants to return the boy and avoid trouble, she agrees to let the boy stay and take care of him for a few days. Later that night, a mysterious woman sneaks into Mingshu School and attempts to seize Ziqiu in his sleep, and a mysterious man appears out of nowhere to steal Qingshu's sword and fight off the woman in a superhuman duel. The fight causes a section of the garden wall to collapse and crush Qingshu's aging grandfather, but Ziqiu reveals a magical power that seemingly reverses time, repairing the wall and reviving the grandfather. Shocked and confused, Qingshu decides to interrogate the exhausted mysterious man the following morning but is distracted to rescue villagers under attack by suddenly appeared feral monsters. When the bison beast Xiqu also appears, Qingshu attempts to draw it away from the village, but crashes off her flight after being hit by falling boulders. Suddenly the mysterious man arrives to save her and singlehandedly slays the beast (reveal to be an escapee from the Heaven Prison) in a spectacular fight. Ziqiu also appears and transforms into the avatar of a deity minister named Aoxu, and the mysterious man reveals himself as the deity warrior Xiu Wu, who was previously reverted to his primordial form as a divine fruit after being injured. Because of Qingshu's bite the previous day, they are accidentally locked in a magical symbiosis, and Xiu Wu needs to stay near her to recover and will grow weaker if kept away.

Qingshu's grandfather convinces Xiu Wu to join Mingshu School as a disciple so he can legitimately stay close to Qingshu. The two soon have to rush over to Tianshi Sect, who are under attack by a trio of Heavenly Demons led by Kuiyu, the fugitive lady-deity that Xiu Wu was tasked to take down, who is revealed to be in possession of Xiu Wu's Chunzi Sword. After managing to repel the attack, Tianshi Sect's leader Mengzhang gives them a book recording various magical beasts and fairies that may be useful in eliminating the demons and vicious beast. They decided to travel to Changbai Mountains searching for a magic fairy and are joined by Qingshu's childhood friend Bai Moqing, a disciple of Xianxia Sect who is tasked by her master Yuxia Zhenren to investigate the vicious beasts, as well as Sang Yo, a young Miao physician-warrior who is in love with Moqing. The team then encounter a group of labourers forced by the local fanzhen military to work in an ice crystal mine. When infiltrating the military camp, they see a mysterious hooded man meeting with the military commander in secret and notice a strange tower formation being constructed near the camp. When staging a jailbreak to rescue the laborers, the team fight off a magically animated armor puppet defending the camp, and Moqing accidentally dropped her personal sachet, revealing her identity to the commander, who happens to be her older brother. Her brother subsequently tracks them to Xianxia Sect and forced Moqing, who ran away from home years ago after learnt of her family enslaving miners, to return home with him.

When visiting Tianshi Sect, Qingshu notices Mengzhang's thumb ring and recognizes him as the hooded man she witnessed meeting with the Moqing's brother. She grows suspicious but chose not to immediately tell Xiu Wu until she has enough evidence. When investigating arsonist disturbances around Mount Emei, the team defeat another vicious beast Hualiu, a fiery mare that can talk, and learn that the otherwise gentle beast unknowingly ended up in the Human Realm and has been somehow possessed with a rage that itself cannot control. After hearing about another vicious beast terrorizing the canals in Liaodong, the team travels to Lulong and defeat the beast Chiru, a dragon fish who also reveals that it does not remember escaping from the Heaven Prison and is possessed by an uncontrollable rage. For ridding the beast, they are hosted by the general-governor Bai Songhuan, who is Moqing's oldest brother. Although finding out they are actually responsible for the miners' escape, General Bai instead chooses to let Moqing leave with them after emissaries from Tianshi Sect arrive and ask for Xiu Wu. When the team go to meet the Tianshi Sect envoy outside the town, the camp is attacked by Kuiyu again. Both Kuiyu and Xiu Wu are poisoned during the fight by a hidden spell Aoxu put inside him, but Kuiyu still successfully seize Ziqiu and retreats.

To heal Xiu Wu's poisoning, the team travel to Sang Yo's home village, Quanyin, which turns out to be a clan secretly safeguarding the Duzhang Spring, another of Shennong's Nine Springs. Xiu Wu deduces that they can travel to the Demon Realm via the link between Duzhang and Yanbo Spring. Yo re-enters the selection trial for the spring guardian and successfully passes it with help from the group, and reveals that he had encountered animated puppets similar to the one at the miners' camp years ago, which attacked and killed his childhood friend. The team then travel to the Demon Realm and manage to survive a fight with Chonglou, who actually is convinced by the group's plea (but stoically not admitting) and lets them pass. They then fight their way to the Heaven Demon Kingdom and are treated rather amiably by Kuiyu, who explains that Ziqiu is actually a forbidden child of her fellow deities. Because love and procreation are prohibited among deities, any deity child born of deity lovers are judged illegitimate and condemned to rot inside the Heaven Prison along with their parents. Kuiyu, a distinguished war heroine who was demoted to a prison guard for pleading for her fellow deities, eventually rebelled, broke some of the prisoners out and escaped to the Demon Realm, but one of the eight deity children rescued, Ziqiu, was intercepted and thrown back in prison by Aoxu, who is the Warden of Heaven Prison. Xiu Wu psychically enters Ziqiu's mind and realizes the child's memories are involuntarily sealed by someone. To clarify the truth, the team sneaks into Zhaodan Spring in the Deity Realm, where the archives of the Heaven Court is kept, and discovers that it was Aoxu who demoted Kuiyu, and that she did not make any the vicious beasts escape from the Heaven Prison, implying someone deliberately released those beasts into the Human Realm and drove them mad. He also finds that Aoxu prosecuted the previous guardian of Chunzi Spring (the goddess Xiyao from Sword and Fairy 3) and had her executed so he could take control of Chunzi Spring as its new guardian. The team manage to convince Aoxu that they are still obedient, but Aoxu planted a spell inside Xiu Wu, who is driven mad and attacks the group upon revisiting the Demon Realm. Chonglou appears and breaks the spell, and Kuiyu agrees to let Qingshu to take Ziqiu to Duzhang Spring to heal, hoping the spring's protective force field will conceal him from Aoxu.

Xiu Wu, now fully aware of Aoxu's malevolence, concludes that Aoxu is up to a great conspiracy with Mengzhang acting as a pawn. He and Qingshu go to Tianshi Sect, pretend to bring messages from Aoxu, and fool Mengzhang into spilling the plan: Aoxu intends to use Ziqiu to power the tower formation constructed in Lulong and disrupt the flow of the Nine Springs. The other masters of Tianshi Sect, who are eavesdropping on the conversation, confront their leader, but Mengzhang escapes. Meanwhile, Moqing and Yo sneak into the Bai mansion and discover that her brothers intend to instigate a rebellion and overthrow the Imperial Government with collaboration from Aoxu and Mengzhang. However, the team's frequenting of Duzhang Spring allows Aoxu to track down Ziqiu's location, break down the spring's protective field using a dragon vicious beast and abduct the boy again. Desperate, the team seek help from Kuiyu, who deduces that the tower formation will be used to redirect and deprive the flow of Yanbo Spring, starving and triggering the impulsive demons into violating the Pact of Three Sovereigns, which prohibits any invasion into other realms. As soon as the demons incur into other realms, the supremacist Aoxu will have a pretext to wage a war of extermination upon the Demon Realm. Kuiyu gives back the Chunzi Sword to Xiu Wu and promises that the Heavenly Demons will do everything to help and stop the other demon tribes from invading the other realms.

Before leaving to fight Aoxu, Xiu Wu removes the symbiosis with Qingshu, but the two confess their feelings towards each other. The team then gather allies and travel to Lulong to destroy the tower formation, which has already been activated. They overpower the Bai brothers and the magically buffed Lulong soldiers, and also defeat Mengzhang and the armor puppets defending the tower. They then confront Aoxu's avatar and manage to destroy the tower formation via a hidden spell Kuiyu previously put inside Ziqiu. Mengzhang sneak-attacks the crowd and is killed by Xiu Wu, but not before General Bai dies shielding his sister. However, it turns out the tower formation is only half of the magical fields, and the other half is operated by Aoxu himself in the Deity Realm. Qingshu and Xiu Wu use Chunzi Sword to travel to Heaven and confront Aoxu at Chunzi Spring. After a tough fight, Xiu Wu impales his former boss, but Aoxu attempts to inflict mutual deaths with him using a deity-killing spell. Qingshu pushes Xiu Wu away and delivers the fatal stab herself, while their allies on Earth time their effort and neutralize the Heaven field. Meanwhile, Kuiyu and the Heavenly Demons are nearly overwhelmed blocking waves after waves of aggressive Garuda troops, but Chonglou arrives to intervene and intimates off the demon clans until Yanbo Spring is finally restored.

Qingshu wakes up from unconsciousness alone and finds herself greeted by the chief goddess Jiutian Xuannü, who explains that she was mortally injured by Aoxu's death blast, and Xiu Wu has sacrificed himself to revive her, reducing himself to a soulless fruit. Jiutian Xuannü then offers to promote Qingshu to sainthood for exposing and stopping Aoxu's rogue scheme, but Qingshu refuses the offer and instead only asks to be allowed to take the fruit back home.

In the post-credit epilogue, few years later, Qingshu, now the new headmaster of Mingshu School, writes in her diary of past events since the defeat of Aoxu. The Tianshi Sect and the Bai family are committed to atoning their mistakes, and Moqing used all of her family's wealth and authority to compensate the slave miners and rebuild their homelands. Ziqiu had joined Mingshu School as a disciple, and has acquired a fairy that can help him resist foul energy. The freed spirits of vicious beasts enslaved by Mengzhang and Aoxu also joined Mingshu School as fairy servants, which proves extremely helpful for the sect's newly recruited disciples. Qingshu hears that Jiutian Xuannü has also extended to Kuiyu an invitation back into Heaven, but the latter steadfastly refuses to return to the Deity Realm. Moqing and Yo got married and settled in Yo's village, and they often write to Qingshu and send medicine for Qingshu's grandfather, but her grandfather has already died of old age. While Qingshu finishes logging her diary, Xiu Wu's fruit starts glowing and catches her attention.

=== Dreamlike World ===
Yue Qingshu continues her training but is having trouble focusing due to her missing Xiu Wu, who remains in the fruit form without any sign of resurrection. She keeps it to herself, but Ziqiu, who has now joined Mingshu School as Qingshu's adopted brother, sees her injecting energy into the fruit every night trying to revive it, and decides to help her by volunteering to psychically enters the fruit like how Xiu Wu once entered his memory. There Ziqiu finds fragments of Xiu Wu's memory and consciousness, and encounters a mysterious female figure, who actually responds to Ziqiu's presence and greets him, revealing herself as Jiutian Xuannü. Jiutian Xuannü asks Ziqiu to return to the Deity Realm, but he refuses outright despite that she threatens to seal his innate magical potential. He also finds a remnant presence of Aoxu, causing him to exit the fruit mind in panic.

Qingshu realizes there is a possibility to resurrect Xiu Wu, and decides she needs to seek help from Kuiyu. When seeking rare herbs in the Changbai Mountain to cure her grandfather's declining health, Qingshu encounters a fairy who can help Ziqiu resist the foul miasma of the Demon Realm. She and Ziqiu travel to the Demon Realm via Yanbo Spring, where the Spring Spirit greets them and explains that Xiu Wu is different to other deities. They then arrive at the Heaven Demons Kingdom, but Kuiyu refuses to help because she considers the chance of success too slim and the stake too high for a mortal like Qingshu. When Qingshu displays her determination by consecutively passing two elemental magic challenges, Kuiyu changes mind and tells her that Xiu Wu is a prototype new deity that Fuxi, the Emperor of Heaven, created by injecting a divine fruit with primordial energy instead of using Fuxi's own essence. She confirms that the energies of the Five Elements (which Qingshu has been training to control) derive from primordial energy, and Jiutian Xuannü has deliberately hinted to her the possibility of reviving Xiu Wu using the elemental energies as a substitute. However, Kuiyu still advises against Qingshu trying, warning that gambling on such experiments is too risky for a mortal, and Jiutian Xuannü simply wants to use Qingshu as an expendable pawn in an experiment that bears no stakes to the deities.

Upon returning, Ziqiu, who has learnt more skills from Kuiyu to control his own power, decides to enter Xiu Wu's fruit mind again. He encounters a memory where Xiu Wu viewed a recorded conversation between Jiutian Xuannü and Xiyao, the previous lady-guardian of Chunzi Spring who was executed for snatching a divine fruit and secretly creating a mortal clone of herself (the female protagonist Tang Xuejian from Sword and Fairy 3). Jiutian Xuannü reappears and gives him blessing for the future when Ziqiu again refuses to return to the Deity Realm. Ziqiu is then ejected from the fruit mind and finds his power sealed, unable to get back in, but the information he learns inside does give Qingshu hope that it is possible to bring a divine fruit to life without Fuxi's essence.

Qingshu still struggles with the decision to try to revive Xiu Wu knowing the slim chance of success and all risk to her and her sect. Her grandfather, knowing her dilemma, decides to settle her confidence. He invites Master Yuxia (who has now replaced the deceased Mengzhang as the leader of the League of Saints) to visit and bear witness to a ceremony, where he formally passes the sect leadership to Qingshu and tells her to go ahead and pursue what her heart feels right. He claims that Xiu Wu is a part of the family, and even if Qingshu fails and even dies trying, it will serve the sect's legacy proud. With her grandfather and Yuxia's encouragement, Qingshu completes the remaining elemental magic challenge. The spirit of her immortalised ancestor Yue Xilou (the founder of Mingshu School) then appears and presents her with a final trial and give her blessing when she succeeds in passing it.

Qingshu enters Xiu Wu's fruit mind by herself, and finds that she needs to race against time to piece together all the fragmented memory of Xiu Wu into the Chunzi Sword, all while under attack from Aoxu's phantom. She manages to put most of the pieces together, but the sword point is missing. When Aoxu's phantom overwhelms her and all her fairy servants, her wooden hairpin, left by Xiu Wu as a gift for love before their last mission, falls out and becomes the final missing piece of the Chunzi Sword, completing it and resurrecting Xiu Wu's consciousness. Reunited, they fight together and destroy Aoxu's last phantom presence.

In the post-credit epilogue, Ziqiu narrates that Qingshu still injects energy into Xiu Wu's fruit every night, but the fruit now actively glows and flashes in response, as if they are talking. Ziqiu himself is due to travel to the Heaven Demons Kingdom, where he can cultivate strength from the basics and explore his own life path. Years then past, Mingshu School is again on the rise under Qingshu and has recruited seven disciples. Qiaoling has learnt to talk like humans, and Ziqiu has grown taller and looking forward to really meet Xiu Wu again when he returns. Moqing and Sang Yo is coming to visit Qingshu upon hearing "the news", and it is revealed the latest entry in Qingshu's diary is written by a regenerated Xiu Wu, who then walks out to welcome a returning Qingshu.

== Characters ==
=== Main ===
- Yue Qingshu (月清疏) — the young lady-disciple from Mingshu School (明庶门) and a fairy-driver in training.
- Xiu Wu (修吾) — a deity warrior who is tasked to traverse among different parallel realms and hunt down fugitives from Heaven.
- Bai Moqing (白茉晴) — a talented young disciple of the Xianxia Sect (仙霞派) who is a sisterly childhood friend to Yue Qingshu.
- Sang Yo (桑遊) — a young Miao medic and the love interest of Bai Moqing, who later becomes the next guardian of the Duzhang Spring (毒瘴泉).

=== Side ===
- Aoxu (敖胥) — a supremacist deity official and the manipulative incumbent guardian of the Chunzi Spring (春滋泉), who sent Xiu Wu on the mission to hunt down fugitives.
- Ziqiu (子秋) — a mysterious, amnesic young boy under the custody of Tianshi School (天师门), who is actually a deity child used as an earthly vessel for Aoxu's theurgic avatar.
- Kuiyu (魁予) — an exiled deity lady-warrior who welds a magical spear, the leader of a celestial rebel group Heavenly Demons (天魔众).
- Yue Hanshan (月寒山) — Yue Qingshu's ailing grandfather and the headmaster of Mingshu School.
- Meng Zhang (孟章) — the leader of Tianshi School, the neighboring rival sect to Mingshu School.
- Bai Songhuan (白松桓) — the fanzhen general of Lulong in Liaodong, and the eldest brother of Bai Moqing.
- Bai Zhongqiao (白仲乔) — an army commander of Lulong, the second-elder brother of Bai Moqing.
- Youlian (幽涟) — a rebel lady-deity of the Heavenly Demons who welds a magical pipa and specializes in sonic attacks, Kuiyu's right-hand deputy
- Zhankui (战夔) — a rebel deity of the Heavenly Demons who welds a double-bladed poleaxe, one of Kuiyu's most trusted lieutenants

=== Cameo ===
Beside supporting roles, some characters in previous games also make cameo appearances in this title.

- Chonglou (重楼) — the feisty but righteous demon lord from The Legend of Sword and Fairy 3, who serves as a self-appointed guardian of the Yanbo Spring.
- Yuxia Zhenren (余霞真人) — Bai Moqing's master and the renowned leader of Xianxia Sect, who is actually Shen Qishuang (沈欺霜), one of the three female protagonists from The Legend of Sword and Fairy 2.
- Yun'er (蕴儿) — an introverted water fairy from The Legend of Sword and Fairy 2, who can become a defensive fairy servant of Yue Qingshu through side quest.
- Tianji Daozhang (天机道长) — an eccentric but strangely capable old Taoist monk from Shushan encountered by the protagonists during side quest, suspected by fans to be an aged and immortalized Li Xiaoyao (李逍遥), the main protagonist of the original Legend of Sword and Fairy who became the guardian of the Tianji Palace at the end of The Legend of Sword and Fairy 5.
- Jiutian Xuannü (九天玄女) — the overseer of the Deity Realm, who also appeared at the end of The Legend of Sword and Fairy 4.

=== Fairies ===
- Qiaoling (巧翎) — A stocky bushtit who can transform into a thunder hawk, the default servant and personal mount of Yue Qingshu.
- Hazhan (哈占) — A mythical snow tiger who was an estranged former servant to Mingshu School, acquired through story arc.
- Chenfeng (晨风) — A young wind qilin and healer fairy saved by Yue Qingshu, acquired through story arc.
- Gubai (古柏) — A mythical deer with earthly powers who was an estranged former servant to Mingshu School, acquired through side quest.
- Shengyan (胜炎) — A hyperactive fire spirit from the East Azure Abyss, acquired through story arc.
- Shanzhu (山竹) — A fruit fairy who grants immunity to all poisons, acquired through side quest.
- Xiaoqi (小柒) — A leaf fairy (the mascot of the Sword and Fairy series) who can summon a devastating spirit alpaca stampede in combat, acquired after successfully completing all the card and platform mini-games

== Music ==
The game's theme songs, soundtracks and scores are composed by a combined teamwork from Chen Zhiyi (陈致逸) and Softstar veterans Rizet Tsen (曾志豪), Chi-Yi Lo (駱集益) and ShinRay Woo (吳欣叡), as well as collaboration with the Owl-Song Studio (枭工作室) in Shanghai and Xiaoxu Game Audio (小旭音乐) in Beijing.

- "Together Always" (相守), composed by Chen Zhiyi, sung by Zhou Shen (周深)
- "Sword Swung to Beseeth the Heavens" (挥剑问苍天), composed by Rizet Tsen, sung by Jess Lee (李佳薇)
- "Heavenward Sword" (剑指苍天), composed by Chen Zhiyi, sung by Li Chaochang (李常超)
- "Dreamlike World" (人间如梦), composed by Angel (安九) and Li Jianheng (李建衡), sung by Lou Yixiao (娄艺潇) and Audiofreak (音频怪物, real name Li Nan 李楠)

== Reception ==
Reception

Aggregate score
Aggregator	Score
Metacritic	PS5: 73/100

Review scores
Publication	Score
GamerSky	7.4/10
GamingBolt	8/10
RPGamer	3.5/5
ZTGD	7.5/10
Phenixx Gaming	8.5/10

GamingBolt gave a positive review on the game's story-telling and excellent visuals. Other reviews on YouTube also praised the game for its musical and graphical presentation, as well as the immersive portrayal of Chinese culture and mythology.

Many Chinese game reviewers complained about gameplay bugs which affected early versions of the game, like falling from terrain that had not been properly loaded or the sudden disappearance of characters during boss fights. The gameplay and modeling optimizations from the initial version has been described as being very poor, and the game is quite demanding on hardware specification, especially when ray tracing is enabled. Most of the early glitches were fixed in subsequent software patches.

The console version reported certain cutscenes in the game where the video and audio tracks are out of sync. The English localization was also criticized for having small, poorly contrasted fonts that are hard to read sometimes.

Some reviewers described this title as being overly targeted towards nostalgic fans of the franchise, as many subplots are purely there to serve homages to previous games. The combat system was also criticised for being mediocre and lacking the weapon collision feedbacks that are common among modern AAA action games.
