= Yao Zhuangxian =

Taiwanese video game designer

- Born: February 1969 (age 56); Hualien County, Taiwan
- Other names: Yao Xian, Johnson Yau
- Education: National Taipei Institute of Technology (BS)
- Occupation: Computer game producer
- Years active: 1991–present
- Known for: Father of The Legend of Sword and Fairy
- Notable work: The Legend of Sword and Fairy; Richman

Yao Zhuangxian (simplified Chinese: 姚壮宪; traditional Chinese: 姚壯憲, born 1969), also known as Johnson Yau, is a Taiwanese computer game producer, working in Softstar Entertainment as the general manager of Softstar Technology Beijing. He was best known for developing The Legend of Sword and Fairy (also known as Chinese Paladin) series, earning him the nickname "Father of Sword and Fairy" (仙劍之父) or "Saint Yao" (姚仙).

== Career ==
Yao was born in Hualien County in eastern Taiwan, living in the countryside during his childhood. He graduated from the National Taipei Institute of Technology. In 1989, as a college student, with the interest in computer technologies, Yao developed Richman, a Monopoly-like digital board game that was published by Softstar. This marked the beginning of his long association with the company.

In the summer of 1995, when Yao was 26, the game The Legend of Sword and Fairy developed by his project team, the "Crazy Boys Production Group" (狂徒創作群), was published in Taiwan, and all the 10 thousand copies were sold out during the first day. The game became a runaway hit overnight and broke the record of role-playing games in the history of Taiwan electronic games.

In 2000, Yao took the initiative to move to Mainland China, founded Softstar Technology in Beijing with several collaborators, which was the subsidiary of the parent company Softstar Entertainment.

== Works ==
- Richman (1989)
- Richman 2 (1992)
- The Legend of Sword and Fairy (1995)
- Richman 3 (1996)
- Richman 4 (1998)
- New Legend of Sword and Fairy (2001)
- Paladin's Inn (2001)
- The Legend of Sword and Fairy 2 (2003)
- Chinese Paladin 3 (2003)
- Chinese Paladin 3 Gaiden: Wen Qing Pian (2004)
- Chinese Paladin 4 (2007)
- Chinese Paladin Online (2009)
- The Legend of Sword and Fairy 5 (2011)
- Chinese Paladin: Xiao Yao You (2012)
- The Legend of Sword and Fairy 5 Prequel (2013)
- New Legend of Sword and Fairy: Online (2013)
- The Legend of Sword and Fairy 6 (2015)
- The Legend of Sword and Fairy 7 (2021)
