= Zhang Jie (voice actor) =

Chinese voice actor (born 1978)

- 张杰
- Born: November 27, 1978 (age 47); Beijing, China
- Other names: Ajie, Ketsu
- Citizenship: Chinese
- Occupations: Voice actor, voice director
- Organization: 729 Voice Studio

Zhang Jie (张杰, born November 27, 1978), also known as Jet and Ketsu, is a mainland Chinese voice actor and voice director. He is a co-founder of 729 Voice Studio.

Because he and Bian Jiang, and two female voice actors, Qiao Shiyu and Ji Guanlin, have combined to be the voices of many popular TV dramas, the citizens have joked that Chinese TV dramas are all four of them falling in love.

== Career ==
Zhang became interested in voice acting while in secondary school, during a period in which dubbed foreign films and imported animation were popular in mainland China. In 2002, he began participating as an amateur voice actor in projects organized through online dubbing forums and other websites. He became a professional voice actor in 2006.

Early in his professional career, a voice director criticized Zhang's diction, prompting him to undertake intensive training in the fundamentals of voice acting, and to reconsider his approach to the profession. He subsequently provided voices for leading characters in a number of popular television productions, including Donghua Dijun in Eternal Love, Wen Shichu in Empresses in the Palace, and Baili Tusu in Swords of Legends. Zhang, Bian Jiang, Qiao Shiyu, and Ji Guanlin frequently voiced the male and female leads of popular television dramas, leading internet users to joke that Chinese television dramas consisted of "the four of them falling in love".

Zhang was formerly a member of the Guanghe Jimu (光合积木) voice-acting group. In 2016, he and Zitangsu (紫堂宿) founded 729 Voice Studio.

== Dubbing ==
=== Film and television work ===
==== TV shows ====
2007

- Love Law Kim Jong-ho (Jin Zhengxun)

2008

- The Legend of Bruce Lee (character "Blair", originally Ted Durham)
- 鸳鸯河 Wei Weiqing (Xie Junhao)
- A Thousand Drops of Tears Lin Boya (Xu Yufeng)
- Rose Martial World (Chen Jianfeng)

2009

- Prelude of Lotus Lantern (Yu Jia)
- The Peacock Flies to the Southeast, Jiao Zhongqing (Pan Yueming)
- The Firmament of The Pleiades, Shun Gui (Zhou Chun, performer), Lan Qin (Li Yanming, performer), Chen Lianyuan
- Golden Taipan Sheng Yueru (Zhou Yimin)
- The Sharpshooter Director Liu (Jiang Changyi)

2010

- Happy Mother-in-Law, Pretty Daughter-in-Law (高昊)
- Spring Glory Pig Nine Sisters Fest / Fei Ge (Liu Xiaofeng)
- Spell of the Fragrance Xiang Haoze (Gao Wei, performer)
- It's better to dance Luo Peng (Zhong Hanliang)
- Too Late to Say I Love You Murong Yu (Zhong Hanliang)
- Beauty's Rival in Palace (Luo Jin) Nie Feng (Huang Haibing)
- Pretty Maid Xiao Qingyu (Chen Sicheng)
- Men's Beauty 2 Zhang Weiqi (An Qi Xuan)
- Emperor of the "Angry Sea Ambition" (also known as the sea vying, big voyage II)

2011

- Tibetan Heart Zhou Tianyi (Luo Jin, performer)
- Empresses in the Palace Wen Shichu (Zhang Xiaolong)
- Journey to the West (Zhang Jizhong version) Wuji Guotaizi
- Sealed with a Kiss Mu Zhenfei (Zhao Chulun)
- The Heaven and Earth Marriage Seven Fairies Fire Dragon / Shen Rui (Zhao Hongfei)
- Love Wakes Up Ji Rufeng (Xu Zhengyi)
- All Men Are Brothers Hua Rong (Zhang Di, performer)
- Beauty World Ming Chongzhen / Mingyi (Mingdao, performer)
- My Daughter Yan Liheng (Xu Zhengyi)
- Palace Yin Reng (cases Fengyan, performer) 14 princes Yin Chen (Mao Zijun, performer)
- Melody of Youth Wang Yuhang (Gu Juji)

2012

- Desperate Love Yonghe (Tian Jiada)
- The Most Beautiful Time Lu Licheng (Zhong Hanliang)
- The Magic Blade Fu Hongxue (Zhong Hanliang)
- Ia Ia, I Do Xie Chaoqun (Xu Yue)
- Fairytale Jing Wei (Zhu Wei)
- Women of the Tang Dynasty Li Longji (Li Chengyu)
- Allure Snow Hang Jingfeng (Gao Wei, performer)
- Dear, Go Home An Yakang (Luo Dahua)
- A Beauty in Troubled Times He Tian (Chen Jianfeng)
- Bounty Hunter An Hi Yuan (Qian Yongchen)
- A Touch Yang Muchu (Zhong Hanliang)
- Palace II Li Wei (Wang Yang, performer)

2013

- Legend of Lu Zhen (Chen Xiao, performer)
- The Legend of Chasing Fish Zhao Duan (Ding Zijun)
- Flowers in Fog Qi Fei (Zhang Rui, performer)

2014

- Perfect Couple Zhao (Wang Yang, performer)
- Swords of Legends Baili Tusu (Li Yifeng)

2015

- Four young names is ruthless (Yang Yang, performer)
- 琅琊榜 listed in the battle of Ying (Zhang Yujian) Zhuo Qingyao (Jie Jie, performer)
- I never thought of the third season Wu Qiling (Li Yuan, performer)
- New Border Town Prodigal Son Fu Hongxue (Zhu Yilong)

2016

- Old Nine Gates Qi Tiezui (Ying Yu)
- Su dyeing and chasing husband Xiao Muchen (Teng Fei, performer)
- Flying Knife and Flying Knife Li Zheng (Huang Ming, performer)
- Qing Yunzhi Zhang Xiaofan, Ghost Li (Li Yifeng)
- Kyushu Sky City Wind Blade (Zhao Jian)
- Boiled Women's Detective Mao Ruyi (Jia Nailiang)
- Taiji Master Taiji Gate Chen Rufeng (Ying Yi)
- Lonely Empty Court Spring Desire Chang Qing (Zhang Xiaochen)
- Beauty for the stuffing Xu Sibai (Li Geng)

2017

- School Flower Prequel: Very Pure and Ambiguous Li Boliang (Chen Bairong)
- Eternal Love Donghua Emperor (Gao Weiguang)
- The Glory of Tang Dynasty (Ren Jialun)
- Please! Don't black me! Blue One Whale (Huang Yuqi)
- Lost Love in Times Yuan Zhan (Xu Haiqiao)"
- Soul Street, Cao Yubing (Wang Dongcheng)
- Tong Tian Di Ren Jie (Ren Jialun)
- The Legend of the Phoenix of Heaven, Gu Qinghong (Zhang Xiaolong)
- Guo Shi Wushuang Huang Feihong Ai Xinjue Luo, Zai Yu (Jing Chao)
- The moment of the heart, Yao Yiming (Li Xiangtai)

2018

- Untouchable Lovers: Wang Yizhi (Zhang Xinyu)
- The Legend of Dugu: Yang Jian (Zhang Danfeng)
- The Destiny of the White Snake: Xu Xuan / Zi Xuan (Ren Jialun)
- Never Gone: Xu Zhiheng (Archie Kao)
- Cinderella Chef: Xia Chunyu (Xu Zhixian)

2019

- Under the Power 陸繹（任嘉伦）

2020

- Love and Redemption (Yu Sifeng)

2021

- Ancient Love Poetry

2022

- The Blue Whisper
- Immortal Samsara
- Youth Song Wu Xin (played by Liu Xueyi)
- Love in the Night Leng Yehan (played by Guan Li)

==== Animation ====
- Case Closed, theatrical version of Detective Conan, "The Sunflower of the Fire" Kudo Shinichi, Kaitou Kid
- 风花仙子传传 Yang Han Lin
- Detective Conan Theatrical Edition "15 minutes of silence" Kudo Shinichi, Ryuhara Winter Horse
- Fox Demon Little Matchmaker
- The first animated MV of Kamon's Seven Poems : Sai Ann
- 侠岚 (千钧)
- Star Travel (Harley's predecessor Miron is currently Mirona)
- Confucius (Children's Channel)
- Dragon Billiards (Fan Hai Lan)
- Garfield 's happy life (mainland release version)
- Han and Han Dynasties (Zhang Wei)
- Magic Detective (Huo Xing, Dorothy)
- Four Eyes Chicken (Little Chicken) CCTV6
- Green Fruit Campus
- Detective Conan Theatrical Edition "The Dark Tracker " (Kudo Shinichi)
- The Romance of the Three Kingdoms (Zhao Yun, Wei Yan, Li Su, Liu Zen, etc.)
- Frog Guns DVD Edition (GIRORO)
- Lightning Dog public version
- Disney Animation " Peter Pan " Movie Channel (Peter Pan)
- 憨八龟 (百丈跳)
- Funny Collection Club (Luo Zhongtian)
- Robotech Shadow Chronicles · DVD edition
- Wonderful immortal child movie channel
- Horton and Anonymous DVD Edition
- Little War Elephant (public version), etc.
- 100,000 Jokes The End of the World
- The King's Avatar – 全職高手 (YeXiu/YeQiu)
- My master's brother has a pit in his mind
- Please Take My Brother Away! – 萬歲 (Wan Sui)
- Mo Dao Zu Shi / Grandmaster of Demonic Cultivation – 魔道祖师 (Wei WuXian/Wei Ying, Mo XuanYu)
- No Doubt In Us (Xiao Jingyun)
- Love Between Fairy and Devil (Dongfang Qingcang)

==== Films ====
- Moore Manor Ice Age Nick
- Narrator of Paris Baby
- The One Hundred Thousand Fires (Karachok Pan)
- Raisins under the Sun (CCTV-6)
- FireWire, Zhong Lang (Zhong Hanliang)
- Let's get married (CCTV-6)
- Spicy Baby (Neil) (CCTV-6)
- Cinderella (CCTV-6)
- High School Musical 3 (CCTV-6)
- Stolen Days (CCTV-6)
- Alice in Wonderland (sea Mississippi)
- Extreme Space (珈罗瓦/阿雷胡·苏拉斯)
- Life Remote Control (Mike Newman / Adam Sandler
- Terminator 4 (Karl Rees / Blair Williams)
- The Rise of the Special Forces Cobra (White Ghost / Lee Byung Hun, Cobra Commander)
- Fengyun 2 (Desperate / Nicholas Tse)
- The Last Road Thunder (Argonne)
- 2012 (Indian scientist, Lama, etc.)
- Action Target Hitler
- Lonely Man
- Transformers
- Australian chaos
- Max Payne DVD
- Gone with the Wind (Ashley) DVD
- One Ball of Fame 2 DVD
- Angels & Demons DVD
- King of the Kings (Jack – Jude Law)
- Renewed Beauty (Alix – Robert Downey Jr.)
- Hot Cow Beauty (CCTV-6)
- Dream Flower (Satie) (CCTV-6)
- Angel's Egg (a gunshot too – played by the city's original monk) (CCTV-6)
- The big return of the game (small spot) 2005 movie channel broadcast
- Carpenter's Story (Charles)
- Brave Bollywood
- Love Pizza (Joy) (CCTV-6)
- Elizabeth Town (CCTV-6)
- Atlantis Empire (CCTV-6)
- The Sword (CCTV-6)
- Wild Nature (CCTV-6)
- The Adventures of the Heroes (CCTV-6)
- Pirates of the Caribbean 3 preview version
- Luo Jialun (Wang Lihong)
- Moore Manor Sea Monster Treasure Ruiqi
- 100,000 cold jokes (movie) protagonist of the end of the world
- Detective Conan: Zero The Enforcer (Kudou Shinichi, mainland Chinese editor)

=== Broadcast ===
- The First Chaos in History (Beijing Art and Culture Broadcasting FM87.6, 22:30 every night, "Broadcast Theater")
- Those Things in the Ming Dynasty (Beijing Art and Culture Broadcasting FM87.6)
- Talking the World (Beijing Art Broadcasting FM87.6, 22:00 every night)

=== Online games ===
- Glorious Zhen·Three Kingdoms Warriors OL (Zhuge Liang, Cao Yu)
- Japan Glory Three Kingdoms OL (Zhuge Liang)
- Warhammer ol (dark elf)
- Yin and Yang system sound
- Mr Love: Queen's Choice (Bai Qi)
- 江湖大梦 (胡铁花)
- Chu Liuxiang Hu Tiehua
- For All Time/Lovebrush Chronicles (Ayn Alwyn)
- Light and Night (Osborn)
- Food Fantasy (Boston Lobster)

=== Webcast drama ===
- Yin and Yang Shijiao
- Matsuda of "Chao Wen Dao"
- Kyle of "After the Stage"
- The Three Eagles of "A Gathering Together"
- The martial art of "FAinRO"
- Juvenile notice narration
- 驿路 North End
- Don't Die news anchor
- The supply of "eight unicorns"
- Tang Wei in The Peach Blossoms
- Kite Legend preview narration
- The son of "The Man of the Mountain"
- Shadow Director of Westerly Radio
- Don't let him receive the letter Father
- Step by step startling of the eight brothers 1, 2, unfinished
- Luping 1–15 of Crossing Destiny Cross
- Death Note night God's notice, one end
- Raslin's preview of "The Apple of Sodom", 2 words, unfinished
- Father Yasen Garda of "The Sacrifice of Dionysus" 1–7 words + three notices
- The fox is how to make it cat king 1 – x words + extra video dubbing
- Abe Seimei of "Yin and Yang", the end of the three children, 蟾蜍, 白比丘尼
- Saga of the Athena Violent Cooking Room's Devil's Possession
- Soul preview (original Jiangnan)
- The soul of "The Soul" (original Jiangnan)
- Jianwang three game video series "Jiangying Shenfu" first episode Mingtong (Li Lie)
- The fox of the natural fox
- Kaifeng Qi Tan white chrysanthemum
- Blind Demonstration-derived radio drama Xue Yang
- Seeing Huan Li Yanghong, Li Yanqiu
- Sha Po Lang, Gu Yun
- Undead, Yan Hao

=== Web drama ===
- Xianjian Inn Long You (Chen Ximing)

=== Single-player games ===
- The Legend of Sword and Fairy 4 (Kui Zhao, Xia Yuanchen, Geng Feng)
- The Legend of Sword and Fairy 5 (Long You)
- The Legend of Sword and Fairy 5 Prequel (Long You)
- Xuanyuan Jianlu Feng Tianling
- The Legend of Sword and Fairy 6 (Xian Qing)
- Mr Love: Queen's Choice (Bai Qi)
- For All Time/Lovebrush Chronicles
- The Tale of Food (食物语, Fo Tiao Qiang, Lianhua Xue Ya, Ba Wang Bie Ji)
- Black Myth: Wukong (Erlang Shen)

=== Network animation ===
- Funny comic day and the end of the world host
- The Spirit of Chess is
- She and her cat
- Warring States Warriors II Hehe Sun City
- Maori Kogoro, "Detective Conan - Assassin in Pupil"
- The game "Devil City" – the moonlight night, the song of the Richter, the library grandfather
- Brown Sugar Gourd Chef
- Bartender Bartender
- Saint Seiya CR Chinese dubbing preview Shaka

=== COS dubbing ===
- Dynasty Warriors 4COSPLAY Jin Ge Iron Horse dominates the world narration, Zhang Jiao, Liu Bei, Zhuge Liang
- Seven Heroes and Five Meanings – Merry World COSPLAY Narration
- Steel refining COS drama "Little Red Riding Hood" Roy Marstein
- [Loyalty Hall] COS "Where is the sea" Beihai Dragon King / Dragon Three Princes / Turtles
- [Loyalty Hall] COS "Reverse Water Cold" 戚少商

=== Interview ===
- Sound Creation Alliance Voice 1
- 09.12.16 Listening to the radio – Interview with Ajie
- [Decision 5th Anniversary] [Communication Network with these events series interview] [Phase 1] – Ajie Maggie Interview
- [All Excellent Voices] Sea Elections Review Special Program "When the Sea Election is in progress [Phase 2] 2011/02/27
- [All excellent sound] top show Beijing landing game commentary special program 2011/04/24
- Guangzhou Youth Magazine "Win the Future" Interview: lively in front of the scene, behind the scenes, the "sound" of the "sound" Jun "sound" live 2011/05/16
- Anhui TV "Beauty World" premiere ceremony (111,123), November 10 recording and Jiang Guangtao, quarter Guanlin, Joe poetic language, Zhang Limin jointly participate

=== Singing ===
- Love of the Empty Chinese version
- Unfinished Poetry
- DESTINY ~ fate ~ Ajie & Xiaoyun
- Beijing One Night
- The mortal
- The Lord of the Rings
- a long distance away
- Spring, Come and Come
- Mudanjiang
- itch
- And try the world – Ajie, HITA
- Song Tang Night Sing
- Devil City, the night of the night, ED- "I am the wind"
- Imperial Chinese corps
- 胧月夜～りり
- Yin and Yang division radio wave brain wash
- The musical " Injury " adapted "3Q injury" cos Tencent
- I have always been obsessed with 甄嬛 甄嬛 甄嬛 [ft.HITA]
- The same way, ‧ remember Mei Zhuang Wen Shichu [Ft.HITA]
- Yue Ruo Liu Jin (the theme song of the radio drama " Sha Po Lang ")

=== Other ===
- The master of the musical " Injury "
- Ajie brand iron pot
- Zichuan report system sound
- UC audio clips
- Sound system sound
- Alliance Voice System Sound
- Beijing Capital Life Radio's Podcast Show on March 20 – Ajie Maggie Album
- Beijing Ka Cool TV "very happy" Wang Fan
- The special program "World Exploration" commentary
- Feng Hua Lu Li Bai
- Jinjiang Literature City produced anthropomorphic broadcast small theater officially launched! [The first bomb: two or three things of the big brother and the second brother] – Big Brother (love channel)
- Full-time master pseudo movie trailer, Ye Yexiu / Ye Qiu
- VOCALOID4 sound library "Yuezheng Longya" sound source
