= Xianjian Qixia Zhuan =

Xianjian Qixia Zhuan (仙劍奇俠傳) may refer to:

- The Legend of Sword and Fairy, Chinese language video game series/media franchise
- The Legend of Sword and Fairy (video game), Taiwanese adventure role-playing video game
- Chinese Paladin (TV series), Chinese fantasy television series
