= The Legend of Sword and Fairy =

- Genre: Adventure role-playing
- Developers: Softstar (1995-2024); CMGE (2024-present)
- Publishers: Softstar (1995-2021); CubeGame (2021-present)
- Creator: Yao Zhuangxian
- Platforms: MS-DOS, Windows, Saturn, iOS, Browser
- First release: The Legend of Sword and Fairy; July 7, 1995
- Latest release: The Legend of Sword and Fairy 7 October 22, 2021

The Legend of Sword and Fairy (Chinese: 仙劍奇俠傳; pinyin: Xiānjiàn Qíxiá Zhuàn), also known as Sword and Fairy (仙劍) or Chinese Paladin, is a Chinese language fantasy video game series and media franchise centered on a series of nine Chinese mythology/xianxia-themed adventure role-playing computer games created by Yao Zhuangxian. The eponymous first game in the series is released for MS-DOS CLI in 1995 by the "Crazy Boyz" team (狂徒創作群) of the Taiwanese game developing and publishing company Softstar Entertainment (大宇資訊). It is one of the so-called "Twin Swords of Softstar" (大宇雙劍) along with the sister Xuan-Yuan Sword series, and has been widely regarded as one of the (if not the) most iconic Chinese RPG series ever made.

The original Sword and Fairy game became both a commercial and critical success across Greater China, dominating the "Favourite Singleplayer PC Game" list for ten years, and multiple sequels, prequels and sidequels (nearly all developed by Softstar's Mainland China subsidiaries) have been spawned due to its unprecedented popularity. The game franchise itself has since branched into other video game genres such as online games, mobile games, business simulation, MMORPG and digital card games. Additionally, there are numerous spin-off adaptations such as live-action television series, web series, stage productions, audio dramas, novelizations and comic books adapted from the main games, as well as associated fan fictions, artbooks, soundtracks, tabletop games, digital skins and collectible merchandises such as trading cards, figurines, action figures and plush dolls.

== Titles ==
=== Video games ===
Release timeline of main series
1995	The Legend of Sword and Fairy
1996
1997
1998
1999
2000
2001
2002
2003	The Legend of Sword and Fairy 2
2003	Chinese Paladin 3
2004	Chinese Paladin 3 Gaiden: Wenqing Pian
2005
2006
2007	The Legend of Sword and Fairy 4
2008
2009
2010
2011	The Legend of Sword and Fairy 5
2012
2013	The Legend of Sword and Fairy 5 Prequel
2014
2015	The Legend of Sword and Fairy 6
2016
2017
2018
2019
2020
2021	The Legend of Sword and Fairy 7

==== Main series ====
- The Legend of Sword and Fairy (1995) — MS-DOS-based, later re-released for Windows 95 in 1997 and for Sega Saturn in 1999
  - New Legend of Sword and Fairy (2001) — CGI-rerendered remake of the Windows 95 version
  - The Legend of Sword and Fairy Remake (planned)
- The Legend of Sword and Fairy 2 (2003)
- Chinese Paladin 3 (2003)
- Chinese Paladin 3 Gaiden: Wenqing Pian (2004)
- The Legend of Sword and Fairy 4 (2007)
  - The Legend of Sword and Fairy 4 Remake (upcoming)
- The Legend of Sword and Fairy 5 (2011)
- The Legend of Sword and Fairy 5 Prequel (2013)
- The Legend of Sword and Fairy 6 (2015)
- The Legend of Sword and Fairy 7 (2021) — 3D action-adventure game based on the Unreal Engine 4
  - Sword and Fairy: Together Forever (2022) — English/Japanese-localized version released on Steam, PlayStation and Xbox
  - Dreamlike World (2023) — Standalone DLC expansion pack, which completes the plot gap between the original ending and post-credit scene

==== Spin-off games ====
- Paladin's Inn (2001) — Business simulation/adventure game
- Chinese Paladin Online (2009) — Massively multiplayer online role-playing game
- The Legend of Sword and Fairy 5: Flourishing Sword in the Red Maple Leaves (2012) — Action RPG mobile game
- New Legend of Sword and Fairy: Online (2013) — Massively multiplayer online role-playing game
- Paladin's Inn SNS (2013) — Business simulation browser game
- The Legend of Sword and Fairy (2014) — Gachapon mobile game
- New The Legend of Sword and Fairy 3D Remake (2015) — Mobile game
- The Legend of Sword and Fairy Online (2015) — Mobile game
- Xianjian Inn (2015) — Mobile game
- The Legend of Sword and Fairy 5 Prequel Mobile (2015) — MMORPG mobile game
- The Legend of Sword and Fairy 3D Turn-based (2016) — Mobile game
- The Legend of Sword and Fairy: Mirror of Illusion (2017) — ARPG mobile game for iOS and Android devices
- Legend of Sword VR (TBA) — Virtual reality game
- Paladin's Inn 2 or Sword and Fairy Inn 2 (2022) — Role-playing/business simulation game
- Sword and Fairy World (TBA, in beta-testing) — Open-world massively multiplayer online role-playing game

=== Other media ===
==== Tabletop games ====
- Chinese Paladin: Xiao Yao You (2012) — Card game

==== Novels ====
- Xianjian Qixia Zhuan / The Legend of Sword and Fairy — A series of novels written by Guan Pingchao based on each of the main games

==== Comicbooks ====
- Shui Ling Jie (水灵劫) — prequel to The Legend of Sword and Fairy and sidequel to The Legend of Sword and Fairy 3 Gaiden
- Yi Xiang Feng (忆相逢) — sidequel to The Legend of Sword and Fairy 2
- Qing He (青荷) — spin-off origin story to The Legend of Sword and Fairy 5
- Zhao Hong Zhuang (照红妆) — sequel to The Legend of Sword and Fairy 6
- Shaonian Hengdaozhong (少年衡道众) — prequel to The Legend of Sword and Fairy 6
- Hengdaozhong Qianzhuan (衡道众前传) — prequel to The Legend of Sword and Fairy 6
- Suo Yao (锁妖) — sidequel to The Legend of Sword and Fairy 3
- Yan Gui Lai (燕归来) — sequel to The Legend of Sword and Fairy 5 Prequel
- Xi Jiang Yue (西江月) — sequel to The Legend of Sword and Fairy 4
- Meng Qian Nian (梦千年) — sequel to The Legend of Sword and Fairy 4
- Xi Feng (昔风) — prequel/origin story to The Legend of Sword and Fairy 7

==== Television series ====
- Chinese Paladin (仙剑奇侠传, 2005) — starring Hu Ge, Liu Yifei, Ady An and Esther Liu, adaptation of The Legend of Sword and Fairy by Tangren
- Chinese Paladin 3 (仙剑奇侠传三, 2009) — starring Hu Ge, Yang Mi, Cecilia Liu, Tiffany Tang and Wallace Huo, adaptation of The Legend of Sword and Fairy 3 by Tangren
- Chinese Paladin 5 (仙剑云之凡, 2016) — starring Elvis Han, Guli Nazha, Joe Cheng and Yang Caiqi, adaptation of The Legend of Sword and Fairy 5 by Tangren

==== Web streaming series ====
- Xianjian Inn (仙剑客栈, 2015) — starring Leo Wu, Sun Xuening, Xu Yue, Tong Keke and Kingdom Yuen, comedy miniseries adapted from the spin-off business simulation game by Youku
- Immortal Sword Storm (仙剑风云, 2022) — starring Benny Chan and Raquel Xu, web film by iQiyi
- Sword and Fairy 4 (仙剑四, 2024) — starring Chen Zheyuan, Ju Jingyi, adapted from The Legend of Sword and Fairy 4 by iQiyi
- Sword and Fairy (祈今朝, 2024) — starring Xu Kai, Esther Yu, adapted from The Legend of Sword and Fairy 6 by Tencent Video/WeTV
- Paladin Legend (又见逍遥, 2024), also billed as Sword and Fairy (仙剑) or Sword and Fairy 1 (in Hong Kong) — starring He Yu, Yang Yutong, Xu Hao and Hu Yixuan, original drama series by Tencent Penguin Pictures, re-adaptation of The Legend of Sword and Fairy, streamed on Tencent Video/WeTV
- Sword and Fairy 3 (仙剑奇侠传三, 2025), original animated web series by Tencent Penguin Pictures, re-adaptation of The Legend of Sword and Fairy 3, streamed on Tencent Video/WeTV
- Yiru: A Sword and Fairy Story (仙剑奇侠传二外传·忆如传, in production) — starring Ma Qiuyuan and Liu Xuwei, adapted from the comic Yi Xiang Feng, web film by Zhejiang TV, Softstar and CMGE

==== Stage play ====
- Legend of Sword (2015)
- Legend of Sword III (2016)

== Development history ==
=== Crazy Boys era (1995–2003) ===
Softstar Entertainment's Crazy Boys Production Group (狂徒製作群) was formed in Taipei under game designer Yao Zhuangxian in 1993. The team was tasked with developing another fantasy RPG game after the success of the first two Xuan-Yuan Sword games, and released The Legend of Sword and Fairy for MS-DOS in July 1995, then known as Chinese Paladin or simply as "PAL" due to its file directory name. In the first month following the game's release in Taiwan, The Legend of Sword and Fairy sold over 100,000 copies, and sales reached 350,000 copies a month after the game's release in Mainland China. The game's overall sales totaled about two million copies, but as many as 20 million copies may be in circulation due to piracy (mainly in the form of illegally copied floppy disks and compilation CDs). It won the "Best Role Playing Game" award from the magazine CEM STAR and the Golden Bag Game Award (遊戯類金袋奖) from KING TITLE, was also on the top of the Best PC Game List of the New Gaming Era (新遊戯時代) magazine for 14 consecutive months until October 1996, and topped the "My Favourite Singleplayer PC Game" voter list in the PopSoft (大众软件) magazine for ten years. The game was re-released for Windows 95 in August 1997, and for Simplified Chinese as the "98 Affection Edition" (98柔情版) in October 1997. It was translated into Japanese and released for Sega Saturn in March 1999, but failed to achieve the same success as it did in Greater China. In July 2001, a re-rendered edition using Xuan Yuan Sword 3's 2D game engine named New Legend of Sword and Fairy was released for Windows XP.

At the same time, Softstar was also working on a sequel by Crazy Boys, but many members of the Crazy Boys including project leader Tsieh Chung-hui (謝崇輝) left the company halfway into development. Yao Zhuangxian, who was running Softstar's Shanghai subsidiary at the time, was urgently called back to Taiwan to salvage the project within a very tight deadline. The sequel game, The Legend of Sword and Fairy 2, was completed by the combined effort of the remaining Crazy Boys and Softstar's DOMO Team (who were mainly responsible for the Xuan Yuan Sword series) and released in January 2003, but the Crazy Boys Team ceased to exist afterwards.

=== Softstar Shanghai era (2003–2007) ===
Softstar's subsidiary at Shanghai, which had then only worked on the Han Dynasty and Rome (汉朝与罗马) real-time strategy game, was also pitching a second game for The Legend of Sword and Fairy series, but Yao Zhuangxian's idea was to have a story unrelated to the first game. When The Legend of Sword and Fairy 2 was given to the Crazy Boys to develop, Softstar Shanghai's project was also greenlighted, and The Legend of Sword and Fairy 3, the first of the series to use 3D character rendering was released in July 2004. After the game achieved good market reception, Softstar Shanghai then started planning the fourth game of the series. However, to raise funding, Softstar soon released a sidequel game named Wenqing Pian in August 2004 using the same indigenous GameBox engine.

The Legend of Sword and Fairy 4, the fourth main title of the series and the first to use full 3D rendering (thanks to the use of RenderWare engine), was released in August 2007. The game was a critical success and widely regarded as the best of the series after the first game, but Softstar soon disbanded the Shanghai subsidiary, whose intellectual properties and business services were all handed over to Softstar Beijing. Some members of Softstar Shanghai went on to establish another company, Aurogon Shanghai (上海烛龙), who created the GuJian series. Softstar Shanghai would be re-established in 2015, but it has since only been involved in developing mobile games until it was restructured in 2024.

=== Softstar Beijing era (2007–2024) ===
After the disbanding of Softstar Shanghai, Softstar's Beijing subsidiary, which at that time were mainly responsible for the sleeper hit spin-off business simulation game Paladin's Inn and the Richman digital board game series, took up the mantle and started developing The Legend of Sword and Fairy 5 in 2009, releasing it in July 2011. The game is the first in the series to have voice acting for the dialogues (Sword and Fairy 4 also has voice acting but not with its initial release; the voices were added years later), but it was criticized for the lack of innovative plot, stiff character rendering and poor sound effects. The reception was somewhat improved with the release of two DLC expansion packs three months later, named Evening Rain (暮雨今夕) and Dreamlike Past (前塵若夢). At the same time, Chinese Paladin Online, an MMORPG jointly developed with Softstar Taipei, was released across Greater China, but the game was poorly received due to dispute with the Mainland service provider 9You (久游网) and the large amount of early gameplay bugs the players encountered. In January 2013, The Legend of Sword and Fairy 5 Prequel was released, made with the same RenderWare 3.7 engine as its predecessor, and was a much better critical success.

The Legend of Sword and Fairy 6 was released in July 2015. Although many praised the intricate plots and excellent voice acting, the game was panned by game reviewers for having obsolete graphics (despite the Unity 3D engine) and combat design, as well as severe optimization issue, with one benchmark even struggling to maintain consistent frame rates with a then-top-of-the-line Core i7 5960X and quad-linked GTX Titan X setup, causing the fans to mockingly nickname the game "Titanfall". The optimization problem was eventually fixed with a software patch. The game is also the first of the series to receive language localization, and the English language version was released on Steam as Chinese Paladin: Sword and Fairy 6 in late 2017 and on PlayStation 4 in April 2019, although its reviews had been rather mixed, and the translation quality was criticized as being very bad.

On April 25, 2017, Softstar announced that it was teaming up with Epic Games to develop a new game, and Softstar Beijing formally announced the development of The Legend of Sword and Fairy 7 on May 23. Yao Zhuangxian also revealed plans to introduce The Legend of Sword and Fairy 6 to the console platform, as well as expressing intention to remake early games of the series. On April 25, 2018, Softstar revealed the new game would be using the Unreal Engine 4 and feature ray-tracing and deep learning super sampling (DLSS) with development support from Nvidia. A playable demo was released on January 15, 2021, and the game was formally released on October 15. with the Steam version released a week later on October 22. In May 2022, Game Source Entertainment (GSE) and EastAsiaSoft announced the game will be released for PS4 and PS5 under the name Sword and Fairy: Together Forever, and the console version was released on August 4. On Valentines Day February 14, 2023, the first DLC expansion pack of The Legend of Sword and Fairy 7, named Dreamlike World (人间如梦), was released on Steam and CubeGame.

=== CMGE era (2024–present) ===
In April 2018, Softstar Entertainment announced that the Shenzhen-based game operating company China Mobile Games & Entertainment Group (CMGE) will purchase its Beijing subsidiary. In May, CMGE purchased 51% of Softstar Beijing at the share price of 213 million yuan. On August 5, 2021, CMGE purchased the remaining 49% share at the price of HK$641.84 million, thus owning the entirety of the Sword and Fairy intellectual property within Mainland China. In May 2023, shortly after the release of the Dreamlike World DLC and the beta testing announcement of the Sword and Fairy World (仙剑世界) open-world MMORPG, rumors started circulating around the Internet and social media that Softstar Beijing is being disbanded by CMGE and there will no longer be any more single-player games for the franchise. CMGE then addressed the rumors saying that there had been some "personnel adjustments" within the company, but the progress of the current development projects would not be affected. As of December 2024, Softstar Beijing's official website (now renamed Soft Starlight) is still operational.

On September 11, 2024, Softstar announced that it had sold all remaining intellectual property shares of the Sword and Fairy franchise to SuperNova Overseas Limited, a Hong Kong subsidiary of CMGE, for a total of nearly NT$200 million (about 44.3 million yuan), thus making CMGE the whole owner of the franchise worldwide. During a Sword and Fairy World fans' gathering on December 8, Yao Zhuangxian revealed that the company is now in the process of deciding whether the next project be a remake of the first game of the franchise or a completely new instalment, stating that remaking the first game "would certainly be the easier option" but story scripts of potential new instalments have been in drafting since the beginning of the 2024.

On December 18, 2024, an official promotional video was released for The Legend of Sword and Fairy 4 Remake, with announcement that it will be made with Unreal Engine 5 by the restructured Shanghai subsidiary UP Software (a word play of "Shanghai Softstar"). A year later on December 29, 2025, a second promotional video was released showing more details on character rendering, open world-like adventure gameplay and an Expedition 33-style turn-based combat system with quick time event mechanism for evading, parrying and countering attacks.

== World setting ==
=== Three Races ===
After the creation giant Pangu (盤古) exhausted himself separating the primordial cosmic egg into Heaven and Earth, his body jewels separated to give rise to the Three Sovereigns:

- Pangu's essence becoming Fuxi (伏羲), who fused his own essence with the fruits of the Divine Tree to create Deities. Deities are immortal, powerful and thus arrogant, but are also costly to create as the Divine Tree is extremely slow to bear fruits. If the deities bear offsprings among themselves, the parents will perish after their essence are siphoned by the child. Because of this, Fuxi strictly forbids procreation among deities, as it would cause their population to dwindle.
- Pangu's energy becoming Shennong (神農), who created the Nine Springs that channel energy across the universe and used his own energy to nurture and vitalise all types of sentient lifeforms, thus creating the Beast-kinds. Beasts are tough, prolific and diverse, but they lack intelligence and easily succumb to instinctual impulses and violence.
- Pangu's spirit becoming Nüwa (女媧), who moulded clay into shapes and infused them with shares of her own spirit to create Humanity. Humans are far more fragile physically than deities and beasts, and are less prolific than beasts, but are gifted with sapience, passion and creativity.

Pangu's heart remained suspended between Heaven and Earth, forming the link between the two realm. It fused with the energy flow of the universe and gave rise to the Divine Tree, providing it with sustenance.

Deities live in the ethereal Heaven above, leaving the humans and beasts to co-inhabit the physical Earth below. As they prosper in numbers, humans and beasts eventually clashed competing over land and resources. After Shennong died of unknown causes, an intelligent beast leader Chiyou (蚩尤) appeared and waged war upon the humans, leading his physically and numerically superior beast armies to many victories. Seeing her creations outnumbered and in peril, Nüwa faked Fuxi's decree and recruited the deity warriors to intervene and aid the humans, turning the tide against Chiyou. Before being slain in battle, Chiyou slashed open a portal into another realm, allowing some of his loyalist warriors to escape annihilation. These surviving beast armies eventually thrived in that realm and became Demon-kinds, while those left on Earth became various feral monsters.

Fuxi, as the Emperor of Heaven, exploited the victories over Chiyou to create a reign of supremacy over the humans as slaves, but the humans eventually started to defy and rise against the corrupt and oppressive deity rule. Frustrated over the human rebellions, Fuxi order Nüwa to exterminate humanity, but Nüwa instead chose to leave Heaven in defence of the humans on Earth. This enraged Fuxi, who had Nüwa's Sovereign title removed from the records of pantheon and had her name replaced with Xuan Yuan (軒轅), a deity general who led the charge against Chiyou. When Fuxi unleashed calamities upon Earth, Nüwa exhausted herself mending the broken sky, sacrificing her life to save the humans she created and loved. She left behind a single lineage of female demigod descendants, whose souls do not enter transmigration after death and instead are retained inside a Supreme Spirit Pearl (聖靈珠) that can be used to command all Five Elements. Although each generation of Nüwa's descendants had also protected humanity against apocalypse, usually at the cost of their lives, the legacy of Nüwa as the guardian mother goddess has ironically been largely forgotten by humans, except in some Miao legends.

The deities, demons and humans eventually came to a truce, and a pact was made that no realm should intrude into the affairs of another, and anyone who declares war first would become the public enemy of all. Shennong's Nine Springs (神農九泉) were also divided among the Three Races — the deities own Zhaodan Spring (照膽泉) and Chunzi Spring (春滋泉), the demons owns Yanbo Spring (炎波泉), and the much more vibrant human world have Hansui Spring (寒髓泉), Rehai Spring (熱海泉), Wugou Spring (無垢泉), Wuhun Spring (霧魂泉), Duzhang Spring (毒瘴泉) and Longtan Spring (龍潭泉).

=== Six Realms ===
The Heaven that deities inhabit is an ethereal dimension that resides above all other realms, and time is also slower there, allowing great longevity. Only deities inhabit this realm, making it the Divine Realm (神界). Both gravity and powerful force fields prevent other beings from ascending and entering it, and all who made it to the Heaven's gates are vetted by warrior deities that guard the entrance.

The Demon Realm (魔界), also known as the Lands of Nine Nether (九幽之地), is a dark, harsh and warring underworld where might makes right. Having access to only one of the Nine Springs, the demons fight in factions over territory and resources, and seven major tribes reign supreme, namely the Yaksha (夜叉), Rakshasa (羅剎), Asura (修羅), Garuda (迦樓羅), Gandharva (乾達婆), Dragonoids (龍眾) and Kinnara (緊那羅). Later on an eighth group named Heavenly Demons (天魔), consisting of deity rebels who exiled themselves out of Heaven, established themselves in the realm of the demons, completing the Eight Demonic Tribes (魔界八部眾).

The material world that humanity and feral beasts inhabit are far more expanse and resourceful, but are also bound by the rules of physical laws. As a result, the realm of humanity and beasts has diverse regions that accumulate significant amount of both ethereal and foul energy, and are subjected to seasons and cycles of fertility and natural disasters. Creatures inhabiting this realm, humans and beasts alike, feed on natural biomass and energy to survive, and some can even nurture power far beyond their innate physicality depending on one's own aptitude, talent and luck. However, since the passing of Chiyou, the beasts no longer have the intelligence and organisation needed to challenge the humans, allowing the humans to hunt and catch them at will. This human-dominated world is therefore referred to as the Mortal Realm (人界).

There is an alternate realm parallel to the human world, where the soul of deceased humans and beasts enter as ghosts awaiting transmigration. This is the Ghost Realm (鬼界), which access to the Hansui Spring and was initially governed by deities appointed by Fuxi, until the truce of the Three Races severed any further business with Heaven. The entrance to this realm is located at Fengdu, which leads to its capital Youdu (幽都), ruled by Yanluo Wang and his court of Underworld bureaucrats. Outside Youdu there are lawless lands beyond the control of even Yanluo Wang, and some of the ghosts gang up to autonomously rule their own clans.

Additionally, some rare talented humans have managed to achieve longevity, eternal youth and even immortality through self-cultivation and spiritual training, and thus become saints. Vast majority of these immortal humans still live on Earth, usually dwelling in remote wilderness that accrete significant amount of clean qi known as grotto-heavens, and are commonly called "Earthly saints" (地仙). A very small proportion of saints have obtained transcendence and left their mortal body behind, migrating to an ethereal realm halfway between Heaven and Earth known as the Immortal Realm (仙界). The process that these transcendent immortals, known as the "Heavenly saints" (天仙), leave the mortal realm is called "feathering flight" (羽化飛升).

Similarly, gifted or fortunate beasts, plants and even sentient inanimate objects can also gain enlightenment and long life, assuming humanoid shape. Those that have absorbed more ethereal energy typically become more human-like fairies and sprites, and those taking more foul energy often looked more hideous and become mythic monsters. Monsters also tend to gather together in isolated pockets of shady places on Earth, and sometimes warping in and out of a hidden dimension. These zones where monsters inhabit, collectively called the Yao Realm (妖界), are closely related to the realm of humans, but most humans or beast can neither see it or access it

These six realms are separated by powerful field barriers, and only in certain places at specific time under the right conditions can portals be opened, allowing practitioners with substantial magical powers and skills to travel between the different realms. The portal junction between the Deity, Demon and Mortal Realms, in particular, is known as the Well of Gods and Demons (神魔之井), which is heavily guarded from all sides by the Three Races to prevent incursion into each realm.

=== Five Elements ===
The Five Elements refers to natural elements that are essentially for the magics of the series, namely:

- Fire, symbolized by red, suppresses earth,
- Water, symbolized by blue, suppresses fire,
- Thunder, symbolized by purple, suppresses water,
- Wind, symbolized by green, suppresses thunder, and
- Earth, symbolized by brown/yellow, suppresses wind.

After Nüwa repaired the broken sky, five of the rocks she didn't use ended up absorbing each of the elements, which turned the rocks into the Five Spirit Pearls (五灵珠). These Spirit Pearls each can grant the owner vitality and great power in combat, but only Nüwa's direct descendants can use them to their full effects and manipulate nature, even from a different realm.

=== Immortality cultivation ===
There are humans who admire the longivity of deities and aspire to escape the cyclical kama of the mortal world. Some subscribe to selfless charity, hoping to accumulate enough merit to please the gods and receive divine promotion; some practise fulu and attempt to gain control of supernatural powers; some resort to alchemy and try to obtain magical elixirs and pills through waidan experiments; while some prefer to train in neidan cultivation and martial arts to achieve supreme physical and spiritual purity. Regardless of methodology, all practitioners aim to cheat mortality and become transcendent half-deities known as saints.

The training sites chosen by immortality cultivators tend to have great fengshui and located far away from the distractions of the secular society, often in forested mountains, caves and islands, where the practitioners can easily access clean energy from nature. Some practitioners organize into sects for self-protection, to facilitate group training and share knowledge, and to pass on their cultivation arts to young generations of practitioners. Some of the larger, well-established sects have even constructed magnificent palace-like temples. During the late Tang dynasty, various sects also organised into a larger confederation named League of Saints (仙盟) to better represent themselves to the secular jianghu and coordinate countermeasures against supernatural crises, particular concerning incursions by demons and monsters.

==== Kunlun Mountains ====
The extensive Kunlun Mountains in the Western Regions is located directly below the Immortal Realm, and are considered the best place for cultivation due to the energy accumulation around its numerous alpine lakes. A total of eight cultivation sects have existed within the Kunlun Mountains, named after the Eight Palaces of the Immortal Realm, namely Kunlun (崑崙), Qionghua (瓊華), Biyu (碧玉), Zicui (紫翠), Langfeng (閬風), Tianyong (天墉), Xuanpu (懸圃) and Yuying (玉英). Out of the eight sects, only Kunlun Sect and Qionghua Sect, who focused on fusing magics into swordsmanship, have had any fame outside of the Kunlun Mountains.

Qionghua Sect, in particular, had gain prominence during the Six Dynasties and attempted to elevate their entire temple into the Immortal Realm. However, their cultivation method involved invading the Yao Realm to abduct supernatural creatures and steal dark energy by looting purple crystals, in order to fuel their twin Yihe (羲和劍) and Wangshu Swords (望舒劍) that can breach the force field shielding the Immortal Realm. In order to do that, Qionghua Sect had two chosen disciples, one male and one female, form symbiosis with each of the swords, allowing the swords to siphon energy from the hosts. However, after one such invasion into the realm of Huangming clan (幻瞑界) turned ugly, which resulted in the Qionghua leader being slain by the Mengmo queen Chanyou (嬋幽) after a bloody duel, many surviving members grew disillusioned of their cause and deserted the sect, among them Suyu (夙玉), the host of Wangshu Sword. This resulted in the host of Yihe Sword, Xuanxiao (玄霄), losing control of his qi and gong berserk, forcing the sect masters to seal him inside an ice cave.

19 years later, Xuanxiao broke out of his seal with help from Suyu's son Yun Tianhe (雲天河), and took control of the sect. He seized the Wangshu Sword for himself and reinvaded the Yao Realm, successfully gathering sufficient dark energy. He then activated the Twin Swords and levitated the Qionghua temples towards the sky, attempting to forcefully settle the entire sect into the Immortal Realm. This practice of abomination not only caused a few more moral members of the sect to denounce their cause and rebel, but also angered the deities. Jiutian Xuannü (九天玄女), the deity whom the Qionghua Sect worshipped, had their airborne temple destroyed by skyfire, and condemned the entire sect's souls to eternal imprisonment in the maelstrom under the East Sea. The remnants of Qionghua Sect temple then crashed towards Earth before exploding mid-air (plot of The Legend of Sword and Fairy 4).

Kunlun Sect, on the other hand, underwent an mundane but steady growth, and maintained a friendly relationship with their compatriots in Shushan and the secular jianghu. During the Tang dynasty, Kunlun Sect managed to become an crucial member of the League of Saints. They were almost wiped out by a demon cult named Jingtian Cult (淨天教) during the mid-Tang dynasty, but recovered over the following decades and remained a chief organization within the League. Due to their remote location, they were removed from generations of political turmoils in the secular world, and arguably lasted longer than all other cultivation sects, with their influence still present dynasties later.

==== Shu Mountains ====
Pangu's Heart (盤古之心), which was suspended between Heaven and Earth, became petrified and accreted rock and dirt from the surrounding, forming a floating mountain chain within the great mountain ranges of western Bashu called the Shu Mountains or Shushan (蜀山). One of the mountains at the center of Shu Mountain, known as the Lishu Mountain (里蜀山), happened to be the portal location to the Well of Gods and Demons, as well as the entrance to the largest pocket of the Yao Realm.

The uniquely supernatural atmosphere around the Shu Mountains did not go unnoticed by Taoist fangshi who sought to cultivate immortality, and all sorts of practitioners had decided to settle there permanently, gradually forming hundreds of small groups and sects that eventually fused into dozens of larger sects collectively called the Shushan League (蜀山盟). One such practitioner, who went by the title "Taiqing Zhenren" (太清真人), chanced upon a powerful mythical sword that fell from the sky, which he named Zhenyao Sword (鎮妖劍, "Demon-Subduing Sword"), and used it to defeat many monsters prowling around Shu Mountains. After Taiqing successfully cultivated immortality and left the mortal realm, his disciples styled themselves the Xianjian Sect (仙劍派, "Immortal Sword Sect"). Although being the largest sect of the Shushan League, their cultivation philosophy of emphasizing swordsmanship training and monster-hunting was considered risky and inefficient for immortality cultivation, as waidan cultivation and elixir cooking was then the favoured mainstream methodology.

During the Southern dynasties, the Emperor Wu of Liang built a pagoda in Shu Mountains to propagate his Buddhist faith. When the Shushan League rejected Buddhism and modified the pagoda, the infuriated Emperor Wu denounced them as false religions and send troops to lay siege to the Shushan sects. Most of the sects that had focused on alchemy and fulu casting were powerless against the military onslaught, and were practically wiped out. The Xianjian Sect, however, put up a strong fight and repelled the soldiers, taking in the survivors and establishing themselves as the orthodoxy of future Shushan practitioners. Sometime during the next few hundred years, the Shushan Xianjian Sect acquired the Three Divine Artefacts (三神器) of High Antiquity, namely Fuxi's Sword (伏羲劍), Shennong's Cauldron (神農鼎) and Nüwa's Bloodstone (女媧血玉). To safeguard these artefacts, the leaders of the sects placed them inside a powerful magical array, and relocated the pagoda directly over the Well of Gods and Demons to imprison all the maleficent monsters they captured and trapped, renaming it the Suoyao Pagoda ("monster-lockup pagoda").

During the early Tang dynasty, the Suoyao Pagoda was heavily damaged due to the demon lord Chonglou (重樓) raiding the tower looking for the Zhenyao Sword (which was actually the lost celestial sword of his respected deity rival Feipeng), causing large number of monsters escaping. The pagoda was repaired by the sacrifice of a Nüwa descendant Zixuan (紫萱), but not before most of the sect's masters died fighting (plot of The Legend of Sword and Fairy 3). The Xianjian Sect recovered under the leadership of Zixuan's lover Xu Changqing (徐長卿) and reached a silver age of prosperity, with numerous masters successfully achieving immortality over the following decades. However, 50 years later, the then-leader of the Xianjian Sect, Dugu Yuyun (獨孤宇雲), mistook Zhao Ling'er (趙靈兒, Zixuan's granddaughter and a Nüwa descendant, who was also the Miao crown princess of Nanzhao) for a snake monster and locked her inside the Suoyao Pagoda. This led to Zhao's husband Li Xiaoyao (李逍遙), a newly inducted lay disciple of Xianjian Sect, to forcefully break into the pagoda to rescue his love. The Suoyao Pagoda eventually crumbled due to Li's daring jailbreak, releasing all the monster captives and exposing the opening into the Well of Gods and Demons (plot of The Legend of Sword and Fairy). However, as the monster escapees saw Li as their indebted savior, most of them retreated into the Yao Realm peacefully and never encroached into the human world again.

18 years after the collapse of the Suoyao Pagoda, Shu Mountains came under attack from Jingtian Cult, who sought to steal the Divine Artefacts and break the seal upon the Well of Gods and Demons to enable an invasion from the Demon Realm. The crisis was postponed by the sacrifice of a master Gangzhan (罡斬), who expended all his qi to strike and injure the master villain from the Demon Realm (plot of The Legend of Sword and Fairy 5 Prequel). Xianjian Sect then launched an counterattack on the cult headquarters and routed the enemy. However, Jingtian Cult rose again 20 years later and wreaked havoc upon the jianghu, and managed to siege the Shu Mountains and open the Well of Gods and Demons this time. After the invasion was eventually thwarted, the seven masters of Xianjian Sect decided to sink the floating Shu Mountains onto the Well of Gods and Demons to permanently seal the portal (plot of The Legend of Sword and Fairy 5). The Shushan Xianjian Sect then isolated itself to the outside world in order to guard the seal for centuries to come, and their glorious past legends gradually became forgotten and dismissed as fallacious rural myth.

==== Mount Emei ====
Immortality cultivation in Bashu's Mount Emei was established relatively late, as the mountain had been traditionally seen as a sacred mountain for Buddhist pilgrimage. During the mid-Tang dynasty, a young woman named Jiang Wan'er (姜婉兒) settled in Mount Emei and eventually established a daoguan there. Jiang herself was actually the daughter of a disgraced Shushan disciple Jiang Qing (姜清) with his forbidden love Yue Rouxia (月柔霞), who was the daughter of a demon lord. She was born and spent the first 18 years of her life inside the Suoyao Pagoda, only escaping when Li Xiaoyao's daring breakout to save his wife collapsed the pagoda. As a human-demon hybrid, Jiang combined the magical arts from both races, and adopted the title "Qingrou Zhenren" (清柔真人) in memory of her late parents. She took in orphaned and homeless girls she rescued as disciples, establishing the Xianxia Sect (仙霞派). Due to Jiang's paternal history with Xianjian Sect, Xianxia Sect maintained a fairly friendly relationship with their Shushan compatriots.

Eight years after the collapse of the Suoyao Pagoda, a demon flagbearer named Kong Lin (孔麟) attempted to revive the demon lord that was sealed under Shushan. The five female disciples of Qingrou Zhenren, known famously as the "Five Wonders of Xianxia" (仙霞五奇), were dispatched to help dealing with the crisis. However, all except one of the five were killed by Kong Lin, leaving only the fourth disciple Shen Qishuang (沈欺霜) as the sole survivor (plot of The Legend of Sword and Fairy 2). When Qingrou Zhenren left the mortal realm, Shen Qishuang took up the difficult mantle to revitalize the sect, styling herself as "Yuxia Zhenren" (餘霞真人). She succeeded in that task over the next decades, not only managed to achieve longevity and eternal youth for herself (making her a certified saint), but also to make Xianxia Sect a renowned leader among the League of Saints. Xianxia Sect was also instrumental in thwarting the scheme of rogue deity Ao Xu to trigger an inter-realm war (plot of The Legend of Sword and Fairy 7).

==== Mount Luojia ====
Mount Luojia (落袈山) is one of the tallest mountains at the southwestern bank of Hubei's East Lake, and was home to two neighboring cultivation sects whose founders were lifelong close friends but their successors had become bitter adversaries over the following centuries.

On the foothills of Mount Luojia sat the Mingshu Sect (明庶門), who specialized in fairy-driving (御靈術), a magical art of domesticating mythical beasts using symbiotic contract and shared cultivation. Mingshu Sect was once a prominent sect during its early days, mainly due to it s founder Yue Xilou (月西樓) famously taming a dragon and attaining sainthood, but the sect remained small due to their intense focus on spiritual talents and thus the high entrance hurdle of induction, sometimes compromising on gatekeeping potential acolyte's moral standards. At sometime during the centuries after Yue's passing, overambitious Mingshu practitioners resorted to enslaving their fairies instead, causing the fairies to revoke their bonds and flee with animosity, and the sect had trouble recruiting fairies ever since because most feral beasts also heard of the news and avoided any contacts with Mingshu practitioners. Mingshu Sect then went into a long decline, and eventually the only people remained in the sect were Yue's own descendants and their immediate families. During the late Tang dynasty, the 30th Headmaster of Mingshu, Yue Hanshan (月寒山), lost all his powers unsuccessfully trying to resuscitate his son/heir and daughter-in-law, who were mortally wounded by snake monsters when helping to rescue a thunder fairy egg, leaving him (now old and depowered) and an underage orphan granddaughter Yue Qingshu (月清疏) as the only remaining members of Mingshu Sect.

At the top of the opposite side of Mount Luojia sat the much larger Tianshi Sect (天師門), who focused on fusing magic into martial arts much like the Shushan sects. Tianshi Sect's founder Zhang Donglin (張東臨) was a close friend to Mingshu's founder, but he died teaming with and shielding Yue to subdue a tiger monsterm and his disciples blamed Yue for their master's death. This, coupled with the arrogant ego Mingshu disciples often displayed (as they considered themselves more spiritually gifted), soured the relationship between the two sects. Unlike the highly selective Mingshu Sect, Tianshi Sect were much more welcoming in recruiting disciples, and were far more engaged with other secular groups in jianghu. The vantaged location of their magnificent temple palace also allowed them to deploy a protective force field that helped the nearby villages repel hostile feral monsters. As a result, while Mingshu Sect went into a quiet decline, Tianshi Sect expanded their size and influence significantly, and eventually became a leader among the League of Saints during the reign of Mengzhang (孟章).

15 years after the death of Yue Hanshan's son, the newly come-of-age Yue Qingshu chanced upon a mysterious fruit rich in spiritual energy, and was mesmerized into taking a light bite before deciding to take it home for safekeeping and study. She also rescued a boy abducted by an eagle named Ziqiu (子秋), who turned out to a "divine child" that Tianshi Sect kept locked up in a tower. When a demon woman sneaked in at night seemingly to abduct Ziqiu, the mysterious fruit transformed into a young man to fight off the assailant. The young man then revealed himself as Xiuwu (修吾), a wounded deity warrior who was stranded on Earth, and explained that he was now bonded in a magical symbiosis with Qingshu (due to her earlier bite) in order to recuperate his strength. To legally stay close to Qingshu, Xiuwu joined the Mingshu Sect, and the pair worked together and uncovered that Mengzhang had been receiving divinity via Ziqiu, who served as an involuntary vessel of theurgy for Ao Xu (敖胥), the deity that Tianshi Sect worshipped and Xiuwu's boss in Heaven. However, Ao Xu turned out to be a rogue deity who manipulated Mengzhang as a pawn to collaborated with a fanzhen general in Liaodong, in order to stop the flow of Nine Springs and trigger an inter-realm conflict between the deities, demons and humans, so Ao Xu could realize his ambition to unleash a genocide upon the demons and resubjugate the humans. With help from the Heavenly Demons, Qingshu and Xiu Wu eventually uncover Ao Xu's conspiracy and defeated Ao Xu in the Heavens, but at the sacrifice of Xiu Wu's physical form (plot of The Legend of Sword and Fairy 7). After rejecting the offer by Jiutian Xuannü to promote her into sainthood, Qingshu inherited Mingshu Sect from her aging grandfather and adopted Ziqiu as her younger brother, and the sect finally started showing signs of recuperation for the first time in centuries.

==== Mount Penglai ====
Mount Penglai is located on an island in East Sea and had long been considered one of the grotto-heavens. The cultivation sect established there were very modest and low-key when dealing with the secular world, and were not as well known as the other sects. Nevertheless, they remained a key member of the League of Saints during the Tang dynasty.

==== Xianling Island ====
A small Island within the Hangzhou Bay, the Xianling Island (仙靈島) was once home to a small all-female cultivation sect named Water Moon Palace (水月宮). The master of the sect, Lady Lingyue (靈月宮主) was a good friend to Lin Qing'er (林青兒, Zixuan's daughter), a Nüwa descendant and the Queen of Nanzhao. When Queen Lin was framed by Black Miao's Moon Cult leader and jailed by her royal husband, Lady Lingyue offered refuge to Lin's young daughter and her guardian servant Madam Jiang (姜氏), who were fleeing from the purge. She gave the young Miao princess a new Han alias Zhao Ling'er, and took her in as a disciple to guide her magical training. Years later, Lady Lingyue attained sainthood and her mortal form disintegrated, and the sect members buried her remaining possessions in an empty tomb in commemoration. The sect management was also taken over by Madam Jiang.

However, 10 years after Zhao Ling'er's exile, a trio of Black Miao warriors tracked down Xianling Island. They tricked Li Xiaoyao, a young inn waiter in Yuhang who was desperate to heal his suddenly ill aunt, to infiltrate the island and sabotage the illusional maze protecting the palace. The trio then attacked the island and massacred the palace, taking Zhao as a captive. After Li saved Zhao and defeated her captor, they returned to the island, and the dying Madam Jiang asked Li to accompany Zhao back to the Miao countries to find her mother before succumbing to injuries. The pair then buried the deceased and left (plot of The Legend of Sword and Fairy). The island and palace was later resided by Li's aunt and his daughter Li Yiru (李憶如), but the cultivation sect had ceased to exist since the massacre.

== Themes ==
Since The Legend of Sword and Fairy 2, Softstar has given each game of the series an official central theme for plot and character development.

- The Legend of Sword and Fairy — Destiny (宿命)
- The Legend of Sword and Fairy 2 — Forgiveness (宽恕)
- The Legend of Sword and Fairy 3 — Rebirth (轮回)
  - The Legend of Sword and Fairy 3 Gaiden — Wherefore the love (情为何物)
- The Legend of Sword and Fairy 4 — Pilgrimage (寻仙)
- The Legend of Sword and Fairy 5 — Wish (心愿)
  - The Legend of Sword and Fairy 5 Prequel — Bond (牵绊)
- The Legend of Sword and Fairy 6 — Commitment (一生一念、一念一人)
- The Legend of Sword and Fairy 7 — Together (相守)

== See also ==
- The Xuan-Yuan Sword series, an older and equally prolific fantasy game series also developed by Softstar. Both series sometimes have homage/subtle crossover to each other.
- The GuJian series, made by ex-members of Softstar Shanghai who formed Aurogon after the subsidiary was disbanded in 2007.
