= The King's Avatar =

The King's Avatar may refer to:

- The King's Avatar (2017 web series)
- The King's Avatar (2019 TV series)
