= The Legend of Sword and Fairy 6 =

2015 video game

Chinese Paladin 6
- Developer: Softstar Technology (Beijing) Co. Ltd.
- Publishers: TW: Softstar; CHN: Changyou; NA: EastAsiaSoft
- Director: Yao Zhuangxian
- Producer: Luan Jing
- Composers: Zeng Zhihao; Wu Xinrui; Zhou Zhihua
- Series: The Legend of Sword and Fairy
- Engine: Unity
- Platforms: Microsoft Windows; Xbox One; PlayStation 4
- Release: Microsoft Windows: TW: July 8, 2015; CHN: July 8, 2015; WW: November 14, 2017 (Steam); PlayStation 4: NA: April 2, 2019; CHN: April 2, 2019; EU: April 3, 2019; Xbox One; TBA
- Genre: Role-playing
- Mode: Single-player

The Legend of Sword and Fairy 6 (simplified Chinese: 仙剑奇侠传六; traditional Chinese: 仙劍奇俠傳六; pinyin: Xiānjiàn Qíxiá Zhuàn Liǜ), also known as Sword and Fairy 6 (仙劍六) or Chinese Paladin 6, is a wuxia/xianxia-themed fantasy adventure role-playing video game developed by Taiwanese game company Softstar Entertainment's Beijing subsidiary in 2015. It is the eighth installment in The Legend of Sword and Fairy video game series, and is an independent sidequel of the preceding Chinese Paladin 5 Prequel. It is also the first game of the series to receive language localization, with the English version released on Steam, Xbox One, and PlayStation 4.

== Setting ==
Legends say when the great ancient god Shennong was born, the Nine Founts were formed. These Founts are also called the Nine Wells of Heaven and Earth, and are sources of nourishment for living beings. Within the Nine Founts reside the world's most potent spiritual energies, and they serve as the foundations of the world's spiritual energy flow.

The Nine Founts were born with Shennong, and were cultivated for countless years by him to gradually become the most important sources of life in the world. To the Nine Founts, all creatures were equal-no matter if they are beautiful beasts or vile pests, all beings share the lands under their nourishment.

Because of the close connection between the Nine Founts and Shennong, the Founts were also referred to as Shennong's Nine Founts, and include: Zhao Dan, Han Sui, Re Hai, Wu Gou, Wu Hun, Chun Zi, Yan Bo, Du Zhang, and Long Tan.

The Nine Founts nourished all, and the world was peaceful for a while, until the three races that occupied the lands, the Beasts, the Gods, and the Humans, grew to become selfish and began to engage in endless and ever-escalating conflicts, leading to a period of great turmoil. The Gods possessed extraordinary prowess, and gradually gained dominance in the conflicts. Shennong realized that with the inception of selfishness, the three races will be hard-pressed to share the lands in harmony any longer. Since the Nine Founts are essential to nourishing living beings, Shennong expended his divine powers to strengthen the Founts' protective wards to prevent them from being damaged in the three races' battles and afflicting all life, and took powerful worldly artifacts to create nine bracelets to serve as the keys to the Nine Founts.

The War of the Three Races concluded in the Beasts' defeat at the hands of the allied forces of Humans and Gods. Chiyou led the Beasts into the Demon Realm, resulting in the separation of the three Realms of Men, Gods, and Demons. The Nine Founts were also scattered around different realms in this conflict, transforming in appearance and power according to their surrounding environments. After the great war, Shennong and the Nine Founts' keys disappeared. Time flowed on, and the legend of the Nine Founts was eventually forgotten...

== Plot ==
Sometime in the past, Yue Jinzhao and Yue Qi awaken outside of a village with no memories of their past. They begin to travel together in hopes of discovering who they are.

In the present, Luo Zhaoyan, the head of powerful House Luo, is trying to defeat a cult organization involved in kidnapping. He works together with the clever Jinzhao and naïve but powerful Qi, who were tricked by the cult. Zhaoyan also enlists the aid of the True Martial Alliance, who allow the timid Mechanist Altar Leader Ju Shifang to assist them. They are joined by Ming Xiu, a strict but caring spirit healer, and Xian Qing, her calm demonic companion. This party of six serves as the protagonists of the game.

During the elimination of a cult cell, they discover a suspicious doctor named Bian Luohuan. While trying to escort him to the city of Jingan to be interrogated by the Alliance, Luohuan escapes with the help of mysterious comrades. Severely injured, the party rest in a small mountain village inhabited by Xiu’s mentor, Gu Hanjiang. As the guardian of the Fount of Wu Gou, he has the ability to see into the future if he pays a price.

The Alliance discover the main cultist base and the party participate in the assault upon recovering, but are defeated by the cult leader, Ying Xuwei. Luohuan is revealed to be in Xuwei’s employ. Xuwei activates the base’s self-destruct mechanism, and Hanjiang sacrifices himself to save everybody. In despair, Xiu wants to resurrect him with the Fount of Long Tan, said to be able to bring back the dead but at a great price. Zhaoyan reveals that she is a woman, and that her brother Maiming is Guardian of the Fount of Re Hai, thus able to send them to the world where the Founts reside. At Long Tan, they learn that it is only possible to revive a person if another is sacrificed. Xiu does not go through with the resurrection and succeeds Hanjiang as Guardian of Wu Gou.

Afterwards, the party encounter Luohuan again. During the fight, Luohuan is severely wounded, but kidnaps Qi. Zhaoyan believes Maiming can help track them down, but he betrays and traps them. He then uses dark magic given to him by Xuwei to break the curse that binds Re Hai to him, passing guardianship to Zhaoyan when he dies. Xuwei confronts the party afterwards and invites them to his base for a truce and a discussion with his Hengdao Society.

They learn of an ancient creature named Zhu Yu with two life stages: hibernating at the bottom of the ocean, and flying up in the sky. The Piscis demon race constructed a city on her back in the sea and when Zhu Yu awoke and flew, much of the city was destroyed. Feeling guilt, she spent massive amounts of lifeforce to preserve the lives of the Piscis, then attacked the Society for the power of the Fount they guarded, Wu Hun. Striking a bargain, the Society used the cult to gather life force to give to her. Their methods begin to corrupt her, and so Qi is created from her bones and blood as a weapon to kill her if she succumbs to darkness. Luohuan was intended to activate her but is now too injured to do so. As Wu Hun allows for travel to the past, the party go with Luohuan to set in motion many of the events that have been encountered up until this point. They also return to Long Tan, where Luohuan sacrifices himself to “create” Jinzhao, an entity who can resonate with Qi. Kidnapping Qi from the past, they leave the newly-created Jinzhao with past-Qi.

When they return, a maddened Zhu Yu flies over the city of Jingan and feasts on human lifeforce, killing many. Shifang sacrifices himself to deliver a curse onto Zhu Yu to significantly weaken her and the Piscis demons. Xiu blinds herself to access the powers of Wu Gou and identifies Zhu Yu’s weak points, allowing the Society to attack her for further damage. With the rest of the party fending off the Piscis, Jinzhao and Qi confront Zhu Yu and defeat her. As Luohuan was so injured when Jinzhao was created, he finally fades away from existence as well.

Later, the party agrees to use Re Hai to heal Zhu Yu’s body and assist the Piscis, but this destroys the settlement of Yinghui Keep, ruining their reputation. Afterwards, Zhaoyan and Qing agree to continue to adventure together, while Xiu returns to Hanjiang’s mountain village, and Qi leaves the group to return to Long Tan. She attempts to sacrifice herself to bring back Jinzhao. Earlier, however, Xuwei struck a bargain with Long Tan as well, believing the disaster caused by Zhu Yu to be his mistake and wanting to repay the Yue siblings. Qi and Xuwei disappear with Long Tan’s activation, and Jinzhao is seen to be reborn.

In the epilogue, Shifang is remembered as a hero for his sacrifice, while his “three friends” and the Society are regarded as villains. It is revealed that both Qi and Jinzhao were reborn, but in such a way that they were never involved in the story.

== Downloadable content ==
The game's release was followed by six downloadable content (DLC) releases, which come free with the PC version of the game on Steam. They are an assortment of story packs that take place before or during the campaign.

Cold Mountain Visitor takes place before the main story campaign. It deals with Yue Jinzhao and Yue Qi's initial awakening outside of Wuyan Village, and the building of their initial relationship. Information is also provided on Bian Luohuan's background.

This Mortal World follows Yue Qi close to the end of the main story campaign as she travels through Long Tan. She is confronted with several memories of her past that revolve around the themes of death and parenthood, as she struggles with her regrets over fighting Zhu Yu.

The Moon and the River involves Xian Qing at a time when Ming Xiu is still a young child under the care of Gu Hanjiang. Qing meets with Mo Huai, a man who wishes to kill Qing in order to acquire the power to become a demon.

Unfettered Chains tells the story of Nan Xin, an arrogant spendthrift whose mercantile family is embroiled in a scandal involving the cult during the events of the main story, and how Luo Zhaoyan becomes involved in the matter.

Beyond the Clouds sees Ju Shifang, in the aftermath of Bian Luohuan's sacrifice, working with the Hengdao Society to learn more about mechanisms. He eventually meets with Qin Dangqui, a man who worked with Shifang's mother, and learns more about his family's past.

Lamp of Life concerns Ming Xiu after the death of Gu Hanjiang, while she is by herself in his old mountain retreat. She discovers a woman by the name of Tan Xiao, who is seeking out the ghost of her departed husband, Wan Chen, and becomes involved in Xiao's quest to see him one last time.

== Reception ==
Reception

Aggregate score
Aggregator	Score
Metacritic	PS4: 55/100

The Legend of Sword and Fairy 6 received mixed reviews from journalists and players. Reviewers praised the game's plot and voice acting, but complained about its optimization and details. MYHP also gave it a 6.5 out of 10, said the game "not so terrible in fact"; they called the game development standards and concepts obsolete. They further pointed out the game referenced many kinds of elements, but lost its tradition. The game received widespread criticism for its optimization problem. The game couldn't get 60 fps even in a high-priced configuration Intel Core i7 5960X with a 4-way Nvidia GTX Titan X SLI, and has been derided as "Titanfall 6" or "The Legend of Blinded GPUs 6".

On the PS4, it currently holds a 55 on Metacritic and a 47 on OpenCritic, with critics praising the music, aspects of the plots and interesting mechanics but criticizing the dated graphics, poor framerate, bugs, and poorly-told tutorials. Cory Bagdasarov from PlayStation Universe awarded the game with a score of 2.5 out of 10, calling the game an "unfinished broken mess that should probably be avoided at all costs." Critics expressed disappointment with the game, expecting it to be a "triumph for Chinese game development", especially due to the popularity of the franchise in China.
