= Chinese Paladin 3 =

2003 video game

- Developers: Softstar Technology (Shanghai) Co., Ltd.
- Publishers: Softstar Entertainment Inc. Unistar
- Series: The Legend of Sword and Fairy series
- Platform: Microsoft Windows
- Release: 31 July 2003 (Taiwan); 4 August 2003 (Mainland China)
- Genre: Role-playing
- Mode: Single player

The Legend of Sword and Fairy 3 (simplified Chinese: 仙剑奇侠传三; traditional Chinese: 仙劍奇俠傳三; pinyin: Xiānjiàn Qíxiá Zhuàn Sān), also known as Sword and Fairy 3 (仙劍三) or Chinese Paladin 3, is a shenmo/xianxia-themed fantasy adventure role-playing computer game developed by Taiwanese game company Softstar Entertainment. It is the third installment in The Legend of Sword and Fairy video game series and the first to be developed by Softstar's Shanghai subsidiary, and serves as a prequel to the original The Legend of Sword and Fairy, set around 50 years before the plot of the first game.

== Gameplay ==
Characters' stats are measured in jing (精), qi (氣) and shen (神). Jing are health points; Qi is the energy required to perform special moves; Shen are magic points. The concept of the five elements (Fire, Water, Lightning, Wind and Earth), which works in a way similar to the Wu Xing in Chinese philosophy, is also applied in the game. Each of the five protagonists have a special attribute based on one of the elements and can use special powers (xianshu) of their respective elements.

== Plot ==
Fei Peng, a divine general from Heaven, fights with Chong Lou, the Lord of Demons. Neither of them is able to defeat his opponent and they gradually become less willing to destroy each other out of mutual admiration. Chong Lou challenges Fei Peng to another battle to determine the final victor between the two of them. Fei Peng hesitates, because he will break Heaven's laws if he agrees, but eventually succumbs to temptation. The battle between Fei Peng and Chong Lou lasts several days and draws the attention of the Heavenly Emperor, who sends his troops to arrest Fei Peng. Fei Peng is distracted and loses to Chong Lou. His sword is knocked away by Chong Lou and falls into the human world below. Fei Peng is punished for breaking celestial rules by banishment from Heaven into the human realm.

Fei Peng, now an ordinary human being, goes through the cycle of life and death numerous times, and is eventually reincarnated as Jing Tian, a young pawnshop worker in Yuzhou. He acquires a magical weapon, the Fellblade, by chance. The spirit of Long Kui, the younger sister of Long Yang (one of Jing Tian's previous incarnations), resides in the sword, and she joins Jing Tian in his adventures.

At the same time, he meets Tang Xuejian, a girl from the prestigious Tang clan. He is drawn into the internal conflict within Tang's family and the clash between the Tang clan and the Thunderbolt Hall. Subsequently, Jing Tian meets Xu Changqing, an outcast of the Mount Shu Sect, and Xu's fiancée, Zi Xuan. He joins them in their quest to find the five elemental pearls, which can seal all evil spirits and monsters in the Monster-Locking Tower.

=== Endings ===
The five possible endings to the game are:

- Long Kui's ending: Tang Xuejian jumps into a pit of fire to fix the Fellblade. Jingtian fights with Chonglou and loses. Jingtian lives with Long Kui in the end.
- Tang Xuejian's ending: Similar to Long Kui's ending, but Long Kui jumps into the pit of fire carrying a useless sword, preventing Tang from making contact with her. The sword becomes powerful again after it enters the pit of fire. Jingtian fights with Chonglou and loses. Jingtian lives with Tang in the end.
- Zixuan's ending: Chonglou saves Zixuan and in doing so loses his powers. Jingtian settles in the same village as Zixuan.
- Hua Ying's ending: Chonglou and Jingtian make an agreement to duel 10 years later. Hua follows Jingtian and they travel together.
- Perfect ending: Jingtian fights Chonglou and wins. Chonglou revives one girl and the other three live together in Jingtian's new pawnshop. This is the ending where Chinese Paladin 3 Plus: Wen Qing Pian picks up eight years later.

== Adaptations ==
In 2009, the game was adapted by Chinese Entertainment Shanghai into the television series Chinese Paladin 3, starring Hu Ge, Yang Mi, Cecilia Liu, Wallace Huo and Tiffany Tang.

In 2025, Tencent Penguin Pictures re-adapted the game into an animated web series, The Legend of Sword and Fairy 3, which streamed on Tencent Video on December 30, 2025.
