= Chinese Paladin 3 Gaiden: Wenqing Pian =

2004 video game

- Developers: Softstar Technology (Shanghai) Co., Ltd.
- Publisher: Softstar Entertainment Inc.
- Platform: Microsoft Windows
- Release: Taiwan: August 6, 2004; Mainland China: October 28, 2004
- Genre: Role-playing
- Mode: Single-player

Chinese Paladin 3 Gaiden: Wenqing Pian, also known as The Legend of Sword and Fairy 3 Gaiden: Wherefore the heart (simplified Chinese: 仙剑奇侠传三外传·问情篇; traditional Chinese: 仙劍奇俠傳三外傳·問情篇; pinyin: Xiānjiàn Qíxiá Zhuàn Sān Wàizhuàn: Wènqíng Piān) or Sword and Fairy 3 Gaiden, is a xianxia-themed fantasy adventure role-playing video game developed by Taiwanese game company Softstar Entertainment's Shanghai subsidiary. It is the fourth installment in The Legend of Sword and Fairy video game series, and is a direct sequel/sidequel to The Legend of Sword and Fairy 3, set 18 years after the plot of the latter.

== Main characters ==
- Nangong Huang (南宮煌)
- Wang Peng-xu (王蓬絮)
- Wen Hui (溫慧)
- Xing Xuan (星璇)
- Lei Yuan-ge (雷元戈)

== Story outline ==
The protagonist, Nangong Huang, is the adoptive son of a former Mt. Shu disciple. Nangong Huang is a guileful martial artist proficient in arcane knowledge and skilled with swords as well as weaponized eight trigrams. His unofficial sword tutor, Situ Zhong (later known as the Drunken Sword Immortal), regularly teaches him in exchange for liquor from the town at the foot of Mt. Shu. One day, while Nangong Huang is in town, he notices a crowd gathering around a performance artist. Nangong Huang reveals the artist's deception, causing the man to leave in a fit of rage. Nangong Huang then spots a peculiar pink peach-like creature in a cage and sets it free.

Nangong Huang then heads to the local bar to get a pot of wine for his master, but finds that his money has disappeared. Dejected, he notices a bounty on a monster at the town's inn. Arriving at the inn, Nangong Huang encounters Wen Hui, a young woman on the same task. The two argue, prompting Wen Hui to demonstrate her considerable strength, and causing Nangong Huang to have second thoughts. Nangong Huang then lies to her about the directions to the inn, heading to exterminate the monster himself. However, Wen Hui catches up, and the two continue their argument. A mysterious man advises them to work together to repel the monster, which they succeed in doing. Afterwards, Wen Hui receives the reward money and Nangong Huang earns the pot of wine that the monster resided in. They go their separate ways with Nangong Huang returning to his master. Climbing the mountain, Nangong Huang becomes exhausted carrying the wine pot, and sits down under a tree to rest. Wen Hui then crosses his path once again, prompting Nangong Huang to propose a trade with her carrying the pot for receiving passage to Mt. Shu.

When they arrive at Shu Shan, Wen Hui is intrigued by the creature that Nangong Huang set free earlier. Afterwards, the duo sets off on a mission given to them by the leader of Mt. Shu to repair the underground elemental pathways of the region. They encounter and recruit Wang Pengxu, an eccentric but gentle young girl with a penchant for eating. Wen Hui and Wang Pengxu both develop romantic interest in Nangong Huang during their quests. Much later, they meet Lei Yuange, a quite man who often behaves suspiciously, and Xing Xuan, a kind monster leader who is skilled at cooking, yet without the ability to feel physical stimuli including the ability to taste, with a soft spot for Wang Pengxu and her capricious gluttony and a brotherly camaraderie with Nangong Huang. There are three endings in total:

- The Wen Hui ending, in which Xing Xuan dies as he merges with the body of his father in order to kill him. Wang Pengxu then uses all of power from countless years of training to save Nangong Huang from a deadly poison, causing her to revert to her original Five-poison beast form. Years later, while Nangong Huang is traveling, he finds the pink creature in a drunken state," and the two join in travels, while Wen Hui fulfills her arranged marriage with a warlord she does not love.
- The Wang Pengxu ending, in which Wang Pengxu grieves for her beloved Xing Xuan. Nangong Huang and Wen Hui eventually manage to resurrect Xing Xuan temporarily to appease her.
- The perfect ending, in which the Five Spirit Wheel kills the final boss instead of Xing Xuan sacrificing himself in order to do so. Wang Pengxu saves Nangong Huang from the deadly poison by using her thousand years of power, with the cost of her losing her human form. Xing Xuan states that he doesn't mind and compliments her form. Wen Hui and Nangong Huang stay together, and Xing Xuan is together with Wang Pengxu. All of the protagonists and Nangong Huang's stepfather live together in happiness.
