= The Legend of Sword and Fairy 5 Prequel =

2013 video game

- Developer: Technology (Beijing) Co., Ltd
- Publisher: Softstar Entertainment Inc.
- Series: The Legend of Sword and Fairy series
- Platform: Microsoft Windows
- Release: 15 January 2013 (Taiwan); 15 January 2013 (China)
- Genre: Role-playing video game
- Mode: Single player

The Legend of Sword and Fairy 5 Prequel (simplified Chinese: 仙剑奇侠传五前传; traditional Chinese: 仙劍奇俠傳五前傳; pinyin: Xiānjiàn Qíxiá Zhuàn Wǚ Qián Zhuàn), also known as Sword and Fairy 5 Prequel (仙劍五前傳) or Chinese Paladin 5 Prequel, is a xianxia-themed fantasy adventure role-playing video game developed by Taiwanese game company Softstar Entertainment's Beijing subsidiary. It is the seventh installment in The Legend of Sword and Fairy video game series, and is the direct prequel of The Legend of Sword and Fairy 5, set about 25 years before the plot of the latter.

== Main characters ==
- Xiahou Jinxuan (夏侯瑾軒)
- Xia (瑕)
- Mu Changlan (暮菖蘭)
- Jiang Cheng (姜承)
- Xie Cangxing (谢沧行)
- Huangfu Zhuo (皇甫卓)
- Ling Bo (凌波)
- Long Ming (龙溟)
- Li Yan (厉岩)
- Jie Luo (结萝)
