= The Legend of Sword and Fairy 4 =

2007 video game

- Developer: Softstar Technology (Shanghai) Co., Ltd.
- Publisher: Softstar Entertainment Inc.
- Series: The Legend of Sword and Fairy series
- Platform: Microsoft Windows
- Release: 1 August 2007 (Taiwan); 1 August 2007 (China Mainland)
- Genre: Role-playing video game
- Mode: Single player

The Legend of Sword and Fairy 4 (simplified Chinese: 仙剑奇侠传四; traditional Chinese: 仙劍奇俠傳四; pinyin: Xiānjiàn Qíxiá Zhuàn Sì), also known as Sword and Fairy 4 (仙劍四) or Chinese Paladin 4, is a xianxia-themed fantasy adventure role-playing video game developed by Taiwanese game company Softstar Entertainment's Shanghai subsidiary and released in 2007. It is the fifth installment in The Legend of Sword and Fairy video game series, and serves as an independent prequel to the third game.

== Plot ==
Yun Tianhe (雲天河), a young man who had been living alone on a mountain peak, was on a regular boar hunting trip when he came across the young woman Han Lingsha (韓菱紗), from a clan of short-lived tomb raiders, attempting to break into his parents' tomb, culminating in the destruction of the tomb, and setting him on a journey alongside Lingsha to the outside world to uncover his parents' past. On the journey, they encountered and befriended the adopted daughter of the magistrate of Shouyang, Liu Mengli (柳梦璃), who seemed to have connections to Tianhe's father, and a skilled and kind swordmaster who trained at Mt. Kunlun's Qionghua School since a young age, Murong Ziying (慕容紫英).

== Characters ==
The names of four playable characters in The Legend of Sword and Fairy 4 came from mineral ores.

=== Yun Tianhe ===
Yun Tianhe (雲天河), who lives alone in the mountains after his parents' death, and knows nothing about the outside world. He decided to go on an adventure after coming across Han Lingsha in his parents' tomb, in order to know about his parents' past, and in the hope of becoming a sword master. He later joined in the Qionghua School with Lingsha, where his parents met and trained two decades ago. Going through all kinds of afflictions after leaving home, Tianhe never change his mind that he can conquer fate and live a life on his own choice. In the end, Tianhe fulfilled his dream, but paid the price of losing sight. The name Tianhe comes from amazonite.

=== Han Lingsha ===
Han Lingsha (韓菱紗) came from a clan living on tomb raiding for generations. She is good at geomancy and break barriers in the tomb. Due to her clan's disturbing the dead, the ghosts were infuriated, which led to the Han people's being short-lived. Thus, Lingsha went on the adventure for finding ways to live longer. She came across Tianhe in his parents' tomb, and persuaded him to go on the journey together. The name Lingsha comes from cinnabar.

=== Liu Mengli ===
Liu Mengli (柳夢璃) is the adopted daughter of the magistrate of Shouyang, whose true identity is the demon king's daughter. Nineteen years ago, She was seriously injured in the war between the Qionghua School and the demon world, and was rescued by Tianhe's father. Later, she was sent to a county magistrate's home, and was raised up there as a human child. To know about the true identity of herself, Mengli joined Tianhe and Lingsha's journey. The name Mengli comes from lapis lazuli.

=== Murong Ziying ===
Murong Ziying (慕容紫英) is the descendant of Yan's royal family. He was a sickly child, so his parents sent him to the Qionghua School to be healthy. Learning sword art at an early age and being intelligent, Ziying became a skilled sword master. He is good at casting sword, and also value maintenance of swords. The name Ziying comes from amethyst.

== Remake ==
On December 18, 2024, an official promotional video was released for The Legend of Sword and Fairy 4 Remake, with announcement that it will be made with Unreal Engine 5 by the restructured Shanghai subsidiary UP Software (a word play of "Shanghai Softstar"). A year later on December 29, 2025, a second promotional video was released showing more details on character rendering, open world-like adventure gameplay and an Expedition 33-style turn-based combat system with quick time event mechanism for evading, parrying and countering attacks.

== See also ==
- The Legend of Sword and Fairy series
