= Animated series =

Set of animated works with a common series title

An animated series (or a cartoon series or an animated show) is a set of animated films with a common title, usually related to one another. These episodes typically share the same main heroes, some different secondary characters and a basic theme. Series can either have a finite number of episodes like, for example, miniseries, a definite end, or be open-ended, without a predetermined number of episodes. They can be released on television or the internet, in movie theaters or direct-to-video. Like other creative works, cartoon series can be of a wide variety of genres and have different target audiences: both males and females, both children and adults.

== Television ==
Animated television series are aired daily or on certain days of the week during a prescribed time slot, including, for example, saturday-morning cartoons, prime time cartoons, late night anime, and weekday cartoons; series broadcast only on weekends.

The duration of an episode also varies. Traditionally, they are produced as half-hour or nearly half-hour cartoons; however, many are animated shorts of 10–11 minutes, which can be combined for filling a set time period in "segments" including several such shorts. When advertising is taken into account, the cartoon itself may be only 15–20 minutes of the half hour, although Netflix and many other streaming services do not show commercials. There are also series with very short episodes lasting approximately five minutes; they have recently become more common in Japanese animation.

If a local station of a television network broadcasts an animated series as a part of its own programming, the time-slot will vary by region.

All early cartoon television series, the first being Crusader Rabbit (1950–1959), are comedy. However, later series include sports (Speed Racer, Captain Tsubasa, Slam Dunk), action (Hajime no Ippo, G.I. Joe), science fiction (Mobile Suit Gundam, Tenchi Muyo!), drama (Neon Genesis Evangelion), adventure (Dragon Ball), martial arts (Baki the Grappler), and other genres.

The first animated sitcom was The Flintstones (1960–1966) produced by Hanna-Barbera. It was followed by other sitcoms of this studio: Top Cat (1961–1962), Jonny Quest (1964–1965), The Jetsons (1962–1963, 1985, 1987); and Wait Till Your Father Gets Home (1972–1974), an adult-oriented animated series in the style of All in the Family. The Alvin Show from Ross Bagdasarian and Beany and Cecil from Bob Clampett also are sitcoms.

=== Broadcast network ===
The 1980s and 1990s were a renaissance of children's and adult cartoon television series. Various broadcast networks and media companies began creating television channels and formats designed specifically for airing cartoon series. Companies that already had these types of formats began to revamp their existing models during this time. Most of these animations were American cartoons and Japanese anime. Listed below are examples of television networks and channels that include animation at present.

American

- Fox
- Discovery Family
- Nickelodeon
- Nick Jr. Channel
- TeenNick
- MTV
- Comedy Central
- Disney Channel
- Disney XD
- Disney Jr.
- Universal Kids
- PBS Kids

British

- CITV
- CBeebies
- CBBC
- Pop
- Tiny Pop

Japanese

- TV Tokyo
- Kids Station
- Tokyo MX

Canadian

- Treehouse TV

Australian

- ABC Kids

Examples of animation-focused networks and channels of at present are listed below; but some of them occasionally broadcast live-action shows.

American

- Cartoon Network
  - Cartoonito
  - Adult Swim
- Boomerang
- Nicktoons

South Korean

- Tooniverse
- Aniplus
- AniBox
- Anione

Canadian

- Cartoon Network
- YTV

Japanese

- AT-X

During the 1990s, more mature content than those of traditional cartoon series began to appear more widely, extending beyond a primary audience of children. These cartoon series included The Simpsons, South Park, Family Guy, Futurama, The Ren & Stimpy Show, Rocko's Modern Life, Beavis and Butt-Head, King of the Hill, and Duckman. Canadian computer-animated series ReBoot, which began as a child-friendly show, shifted its target group to ages 12 and up, resulting in a darker and more mature storyline.

== Film theatrical ==
Animated film theatrical series include all early animated series: The Newlyweds (1913–1914), Travelaughs (1913, 1915–1918, 1921–1923), Doc Yak (1913–1915), Colonel Heeza Liar (1913–1917, 1922–1924), Grogg the Sailor Man (1916–1922), Les Aventures des Pieds Nickelés (1917–1918), the Tom and Jerry cartoon short films released in movie theaters from 1940 to 1967, and many others.

== Direct-to-video ==
Direct-to-video animated series include Japanese OVA series, the first of which was the science fiction drama Dallos (1983–1985). Almost all hentai (pornographic) anime series are released as OVAs.

== Web series ==
Animated web series are designed and produced for websites, streaming and online video platforms. Examples include Happy Tree Friends (2000–2016), Battle for Dream Island (2010–present), Homestar Runner (2000–present), Annoying Orange (2009–present), Eddsworld (2003–present), Too Cool! Cartoons (2013–2014), RWBY (2013–present), Jaiden Animations (2014–present), The King's Avatar (2017–present), and many others.

== Sources ==
- Bendazzi, Giannalberto (2016). Animation: A World History. Vol. 1. Boca Raton, FL: CRC Press. ISBN 978-1-1388-5452-9.
- Crafton, Donald (1990). Emile Cohl, caricature, and film. Princeton, NJ: Princeton University Press. ISBN 978-0-691-05581-7.
- Lenburg, Jeff (2009). The Encyclopedia of Animated Cartoons (3rd ed.). New York, NY: Facts On File. ISBN 978-0-8160-6599-8.
