= Richman (series) =

Taiwanese computer board game series

- Logo from Richman 11
- Genre: Board game
- Developer: Softstar Entertainment
- Publisher: Softstar Entertainment
- Creator: Yao Zhuangxian
- Platforms: MS-DOS, Windows, iOS, Android
- First release: Richman; November 28, 1989
- Latest release: Richman 11; October 19, 2022

Richman (Chinese: 大富翁; pinyin: Dà Fùwēng; lit. 'Big Tycoon') is a series of digital board games created and published by Taiwanese game developer company Softstar Entertainment From 1989 to 2022.

== Gameplay ==
Similarly to the Monopoly board game, players must gain the most wealth and/or bankrupt other players as they traverse in a game map, filled with property plots and other special tiles. The goal is achieved mainly by purchasing property and receiving rent from opponents, or investing in a simulated stock market. The gameplay usually also features a selection of minigames, special items, and random events that can change the standings.

In Richman Fight, players need to choose different characters and prepare 8 function cards in repeat deck before starting a game. After the game start, players need to use a dice to control their chosen character in the map and make the opponents bankrupt through the effects of function cards, construct the special property, and release the character's ability. And also players can earn cards or trigger effects in different special blocks on a map to help them win a game.

== History ==
Richman 8, released in 2006, was claimed to be the last main series Richman game, as a consequence of "shrinking single-player markets and lack of breakthrough in gameplay". However, spin-off titles including Richman 4 Fun for iOS and Android platforms and Richman WEB were released after that. A Beijing subsidiary of Softstar has also licensed the development of a mobile-only Richman 9 to a Hangzhou company.

== Releases ==
- Richman (1989)
- Richman 2 (1993)
- Richman 3 (1996)
- Richman 4 (1998)
- Richman 5 (2001)
- Richman 6 (2002)
- Richman 7 (2003)
- Richman 8 (2006)
- Richman Online (2006)
- Richman 4 Fun (2012)
- Richman WEB (2012)
- Richman 9 (2016)
- Richman Fight (2018)
- Richman 10 (2019)
- Richman 11 (2022)

== See also ==
- Monopoly (game)
- Fortune Street
- Momotaro Dentetsu
