= The Legend of Sword and Fairy 2 =

2003 video game

- Developer: Softstar Entertainment Inc.
- Publisher: Softstar Entertainment Inc.
- Series: The Legend of Sword and Fairy series
- Platform: Microsoft Windows
- Release: 23 January 2003 (Taiwan); 26 January 2003 (China)
- Genre: Role-playing
- Mode: Single-player

The Legend of Sword and Fairy 2 (simplified Chinese: 仙剑奇侠传二; traditional Chinese: 仙劍奇俠傳二; pinyin: Xiānjiàn Qíxiá Zhuàn Èr), also known as Sword and Fairy 2 (仙劍二) or Chinese Paladin 2, is a fantasy adventure role-playing video game developed by the DOMO group (known for its role in developing the long-running Xuan-Yuan Sword game series) and the now defunct Crazy Boys Production Group under Taiwanese game company Softstar Entertainment. It is the second installment in The Legend of Sword and Fairy video game series, and serves as a direct sequel to the original The Legend of Sword and Fairy game, set 8 years after the plot of the first game.

== Plot ==
The story is set eight years after the ending of the first game. Wang Xiaohu, a boy from the same hometown as Li Xiaoyao (the protagonist of the first game), has reached the age of 18. When he was still a child, he was impressed by the story of how Li braved danger to seek a cure for his ill aunt, and has since looked up to Li as an idol. Although he did not have an opportunity to learn from Li, he still hopes to become a great hero one day. Wang inherits his master's prized weapon, the Demon Blade, and sets off on his own adventure. He meets the three female protagonists: Li Yiru, Su Mei and Shen Qishuang. Li is the daughter of Li Xiaoyao and Zhao Ling'er; Su (appeared as a nameless baby fox in the first game) is the daughter of a serpent demon and a vixen demon, and she vows to avenge her parents, who were killed by Li Xiaoyao and Lin Yueru; Shen is a new character who has no apparent connections to the first game.

In the meantime, China is in a state of chaos, as demons have been roaming the land unchecked ever since the Demon Prison Tower collapsed in the first game. A monk called Master Qianye appears and recruits followers to form a sect known as the "Great Merciful Sect" to counter the demons and save the people. This sect, along with the Mount Shu Sect (now led by Li Xiaoyao), are seen as the pillars of righteousness in the jianghu. On the other hand, Kong Lin, an assistant of the Lord of Demons, seeks to retrieve three treasures and put them together, in order to resurrect the Lord and allow demons to dominate the world.

The four protagonists set foot into the dangerous world of the jianghu, where they discover secrets of their past, understand the meaning of forgiveness and love, and join the battle between good and evil.
