= The King's Avatar (2017 web series) =

Chinese donghua web series

- Chinese: 全职高手
- Literal meaning: Master of All Classes
- Hanyu Pinyin: Quánzhí Gāoshǒu
- Genre: Action; Adventure; Esports
- Based on: The King's Avatar by Hu Dielan
- Written by: Sha Liang
- Directed by: Ke Xiong
- Voices of: Zhang Jie; C Xiaodiao; Ye Qing; Xia Lei; Liu Sanmu; Baomu Zhongyang; Jin Xian
- Opening theme: "Conviction" performed by Zhang Jie; "Glory Returns" performed by Dadan Yinzu
- Composer: Fantasy Music
- Country of origin: China
- Original language: Mandarin
- No. of seasons: 3
- No. of episodes: 41 + 3 specials

Production
- Running time: 25 minutes
- Production companies: G.CMay Animation & Film (season 1); Colored-Pencil Animation Design (specials, seasons 2-3)

Original release
- Network: Tencent QQ; Tencent Video; bilibili; YouTube; Crunchyroll
- Release: April 19, 2017 – present

The King's Avatar (Chinese: 全职高手; pinyin: Quánzhí Gāoshǒu) is a Chinese donghua web series aired in 2017, based on the web novel of the same name written by Hu Dielan. The series depicted the fictional esports scene in China where the story revolves around a multiplayer online video game called Glory. The series was produced by Chinese internet company Tencent. A three-episode sequel premiered in 2018, and a prequel film, The King's Avatar: For the Glory, had a 2019 release. The long delayed second season aired in 2020, and the third season aired in 2024. The complete first and second seasons were released on Crunchyroll in Chinese with English subtitles on February 19, 2025.

== Plot ==
The King's Avatar follows the story of Ye Xiu, a professional esports player living in Hangzhou, China. Widely considered the best player of the video game Glory, Ye Xiu was captain of the esports team, "Excellent Era", holding the account of the 'Battle God', 'One Autumn Leaf' before being forced to resign from the team, giving up one of the strongest accounts in the game and leaving the competitive scene due to his unwillingness to take part in any marketing to profit the team. Ye Xiu ends up finding work as a night-shift manager at Happy Internet Cafe, where he meets Chen Guo, the owner of the cafe who happens to be a huge fan of his alias 'Ye Qiu', his former team and character 'One Autumn Leaf'. While awaiting his return to the competitive scene, Ye Xiu continues playing the game, building a character from scratch and pursuing championship and glory.

== Characters ==
=== Team Happy ===
- Ye Xiu (Voiced by: Zhang Jie (Chinese); Yuichi Nakamura (Japanese)) - formerly in Team Excellent Era
- Chen Guo (Voiced by: Ji Guanlin)
- Su Mucheng (Voiced by: Tong Xinzhu (animation), Liu Xiaoyu (audio drama) (Chinese); Mamiko Noto (Japanese)) - formerly in Team Excellent Era
- Tang Rou (Voiced by: Qiao Shiyu)
- Bao Rongxing (Voiced by: Teng Xin)
- Luo Ji (Voiced by: Zhang Boheng)
- Qiao Yifan (Voiced by: Su Shangqing) - formerly in Team Tiny Herb
- Wei Chen (Voiced by: Feng Sheng (aka Tute Hameng))
- An Wenyi (Voiced by: Chenzhang Taikang)
- Mo Fan (Voiced by: Zhang Fuzheng)

=== Team Excellent Era ===
- Sun Xiang (Voiced by: Liu Sanmu)
- Xiao Shiqin (Voiced by: Peng Yao) - formerly team captain of Thunderclap

=== Team Blue Rain ===
- Yu Wenzhou (Voiced by: Xia Lei)
- Huang Shaotian (Voiced by: Ye Qing)

=== Team Tiny Herb ===
- Wang Jiexi (Voiced by: Wei Chao)
- Gao Yingjie (Voiced by: Shao Tong)

=== Team Tyranny ===
- Han Wenqing (Voiced by: Song Ming (aka Baomu Zhongyang) (Chinese); Shinichiro Kamio (Japanese))
- Zhang Xinjie (Voiced by: Bian Jiang (animation), Zhang Fuzheng (web series))

=== Team Samsara ===
- Zhou Zekai (Voiced by: Jin Xian)

=== Team Thunderclap ===
- Liu Hao (Voiced by: Zhao Yi) - formerly in Team Excellent Era

== Series overview ==
Season	Episodes	Originally released		US release
Season	Episodes	First released	Last released	US release
1	12	April 7, 2017	June 16, 2017	February 19, 2025
OVA	3	April 27, 2018	May 11, 2018	TBA
Movie		August 16, 2019		TBA
2	12	September 25, 2020	December 4, 2020	February 19, 2025
3	17	May 31, 2024	September 13, 2024	TBA

The first season aired from April to June 2017. A three-episode OVA sequel was released in May 2018. A prequel movie was released in August 2019 and the second season aired from September to December 2020. The third season aired from May to September 2024. The complete first and second seasons were released on Crunchyroll in Chinese with English subtitles on February 19, 2025.

=== Season 1 (2017) ===
No. overall	No. in season	Title	Directed by	Written by	Original release date
1	1	"Ye Qiu? Ye Xiu?"	Xiong Ke	Liang Sha	April 7, 2017
Ye Qiu is kicked out of his team that he has captained for eight years due to his unwillingness to take part in marketing and promotion deals making him worthless, despite his skills and his three straight championship wins with the team in the last three years. He eventually remembers the opening of the new server and walks into an internet cafe near the team headquarters and finds himself starting at the bottom and working at the internet cafe as a night-shift manager.
2	2	"The Skilled Supervisor"	Xiong Ke	Liang Sha	April 7, 2017
3	3	"Adventurers Are Always Free-Willed"	Xiong Ke	Liang Sha, Liu Xing, Zhu Ke	April 14, 2017
4	4	"Wild Bosses Are Meant to Be Stolen!"	Xiong Ke	Liang Sha, Liu Xing, Zhu Ke	April 21, 2017
5	5	"A Single-Player Game?"	Xiong Ke	Liang Sha, Liu Xing, Zhu Ke	April 28, 2017
6	6	"Blade Master"	Xiong Ke	Liang Sha, Liu Xing, Zhu Ke	May 5, 2017
7	7	"The Greatest Boss in History"	Xiong Ke	Liang Sha, Liu Xing, Zhu Ke	May 12, 2017
8	8	"Youngsters, Let's Meet Up!"	Xiong Ke	Liang Sha, Liu Xing, Zhu Ke	May 19, 2017
9	9	"Public Enemy"	Xiong Ke	Liang Sha, Liu Xing, Zhu Ke	May 26, 2017
10	10	"Master Tactician's Strategy"	Xiong Ke	Liang Sha, Liu Xing, Zhu Ke	June 2, 2017
11	11	"Using the Right Method to Tell You What Is Considered Brutal"	Xiong Ke	Liang Sha, Liu Xing, Zhu Ke	June 9, 2017
12	12	"10 Years of Glory, and It Continues"	Xiong Ke	Liang Sha, Liu Xing, Zhu Ke	June 16, 2017

=== OVA (2018) ===
No. in season	Title	Directed by	Written by	Original release date
1	"Episode One"	Shi Juansheng	Unknown	April 27, 2018
2	"Episode Two"	Shi Juansheng	Unknown	May 4, 2018
3	"Episode Three"	Shi Juansheng	Unknown	May 11, 2018

=== Season 2 (2020) ===
No. overall	No. in season	Title	Directed by	Written by	Original release date
13	1	"Step one, back to the Pro game"	Unknown	Unknown	September 25, 2020
14	2	"Happy New Year"	Unknown	Unknown	September 25, 2020
15	3	"Heavenly Domain"	Unknown	Unknown	October 2, 2020
16	4	"Unspecialized Strikes"	Unknown	Unknown	October 9, 2020
17	5	"Professional Scrap-Picker"	Unknown	Unknown	October 16, 2020
18	6	"Negative Example"	Unknown	Unknown	October 23, 2020
19	7	"Boss of Excellent Era"	Unknown	Unknown	October 30, 2020
20	8	"Ancient Gods"	Unknown	Unknown	November 6, 2020
21	9	"Material Problem"	Unknown	Unknown	November 13, 2020
22	10	"Champion Heart"	Unknown	Unknown	November 20, 2020
23	11	"Little Cold Hands"	Unknown	Unknown	November 27, 2020
24	12	"Team Happy"	Unknown	Unknown	December 4, 2020

=== Season 3 (2024) ===
No. overall	No. in season	Title	Directed by	Written by	Original release date
25	1	TBA	Zhang Yingying	Unknown	May 31, 2024
26	2	TBA	Zhang Yingying	Unknown	May 31, 2024
27	3	TBA	Zhang Yingying	Unknown	June 7, 2024
28	4	TBA	Zhang Yingying	Unknown	June 14, 2024
29	5	TBA	Zhang Yingying	Unknown	June 21, 2024
30	6	TBA	Zhang Yingying	Unknown	June 28, 2024
31	7	TBA	Zhang Yingying	Unknown	July 5, 2024
32	8	TBA	Zhang Yingying	Unknown	July 12, 2024
33	9	TBA	Zhang Yingying	Unknown	July 19, 2024
34	10	TBA	Zhang Yingying	Unknown	July 26, 2024
35	11	TBA	Zhang Yingying	Unknown	August 2, 2024
36	12	TBA	Zhang Yingying	Unknown	August 9, 2024
37	13	TBA	Zhang Yingying	Unknown	August 16, 2024
38	14	TBA	Zhang Yingying	Unknown	August 23, 2024
39	15	TBA	Zhang Yingying	Unknown	August 30, 2024
40	16	TBA	Zhang Yingying	Unknown	September 6, 2024
41	17	TBA	Zhang Yingying	Unknown	September 13, 2024

== Awards and nominations ==
Award	Category	Nominated work	Result	Ref.
14th China Animation Golden Dragon Award	Best Serial Animation Award (Gold Award)	The King's Avatar	Won	
16th China Animation Golden Dragon Award	Best Serial Animation Award (Bronze Award)	The King's Avatar: For The Glory	Won	
Canada China International Film Festival	Best Animation	The King's Avatar: For The Glory	Won	
China Literature Award Ceremony	Animation of the Year	The King's Avatar: For The Glory	Won	
