= The Legend of Sword and Fairy 5 =

2011 video game

- Developer: Softstar Technology (Beijing) Co., Ltd
- Publisher: Softstar Entertainment Inc.
- Series: The Legend of Sword and Fairy series
- Platform: Microsoft Windows
- Release: 7 July 2011 (Taiwan); 7 July 2011 (China)
- Genre: Role-playing video game
- Mode: Single player

The Legend of Sword and Fairy 5 (simplified Chinese: 仙剑奇侠传五; traditional Chinese: 仙劍奇俠傳五; pinyin: Xiānjiàn Qíxiá Zhuàn Wǚ), also known as Sword and Fairy 5 (仙劍五) or Chinese Paladin 5, is a shenmo/xianxia-themed fantasy adventure role-playing video game developed by Taiwanese game company Softstar Entertainment's Beijing subsidiary. It is the sixth installment in the Legend of Sword and Fairy video game series, and serves as a sequel to the second game, with the plot set around 30 years later.

== Main characters ==
- Jiang Yunfan (姜雲凡)
- Tang Yurou (唐雨柔)
- Long You (龍幽)
- Xiao Man (小蠻)
