= The Legend of Sword and Fairy (video game) =

1995 video game

- MS-DOS cover art
- Developer: Softstar
- Publisher: Softstar
- Programmer: Yao Zhuangxian
- Series: The Legend of Sword and Fairy
- Engine: Microsoft QBASIC; Assembly
- Platforms: MS-DOS, Windows, Sega Saturn, iOS
- Release: July 1995 (Taiwan); 1996 (Mainland China); 1999 (Japan)
- Genre: Role-playing
- Mode: Single-player

The Legend of Sword and Fairy
- Traditional Chinese: 仙劍奇俠傳
- Simplified Chinese: 仙剑奇侠传
Transcriptions
Standard Mandarin
- Hanyu Pinyin: Xiānjiàn Qíxiá Zhuàn

The Legend of Sword and Fairy (Chinese: 仙劍奇俠傳), also known colloquially as Sword and Fairy 1 (仙劍一), is a fantasy adventure role-playing video game developed by the Taiwanese game company Softstar Entertainment, incorporating elements of wuxia, shenmo and xianxia and heavy inspirations from traditional Chinese mythology. Initially released in 1995 for the MS-DOS platform, the game was later re-released for Windows 95 in 1997, for Sega Saturn in 1999, and as a re-rendered version for Windows 98/Windows XP in 2001.

The game was a huge critical and commercial success (despite, or because, of rampant piracy) across Greater China and has been widely praised as one of the most iconic and influential Chinese RPG games of all time, and its further worldbuilding has since spawned a successful video game franchise in Taiwan and Mainland China. In addition to video games, it has also developed into a media franchise of live-action performances (television series, web series and stage productions, most famously a 2005 television adaptation by Tangren Media starring Hu Ge in his breakout role), audio dramas, comic books, artbooks, novelizations and fan fictions, as well as various digital and collectible merchandises.

== English translations of the game title ==
The game title was unofficially translated into English as The Magic Sword and the Chivalrous Youngsters, and Chinese Paladin. Softstar Entertainment officially named it The Legend of Sword and Fairy upon the release of the sequel. However, in the third and fourth instalments, the English title was changed to Chinese Paladin and has remained as such since then.

== Synopsis ==
=== Settings ===
The game is set in a Wuxia fantasy version of medieval China. Central to the story is Yunnan and its historical Kingdom of Nanzhao, ruling during the 8th and 9th centuries, whereas the depiction of the Chinese heartland vaguely resembles a mix of Tang and Song dynasty settings. It presents a fictionalized civil war that ravages Nanzhao and its Miao populace, and later spilling into the Han lands, setting off the main plot. The game mostly features real locations, beginning in Yuhang in northern Zhejiang, and then continuing through the likes of Suzhou and Yangzhou, eventually ending up in the Nanzhao capital of Dali City.

=== Characters ===
Li Xiaoyao is an teenaged orphan with dreams of becoming a wandering swordsman, living with his aunt, who runs an inn in a small fishing village in Yuhang County. He is receiving dubious guidance from a perpetually intoxicated master of the Shushan School, a powerful cultivation sect. However, Xiaoyao is soon thrust unexpectedly into a quest across China with Zhao Ling'er, an exiled princess with great powers of sorcery who is the heir to the throne of Nanzhao. They are aided by the chivalrous swordswoman Lin Yueru, and later A'nu, a young Miao shamaness. Romantic tension persists during the group's journey as they become increasingly embroiled in Nanzhao political intrigue and the prolonged conflict that saw the country divided between the White Miao and the Black Miao. Their effort to reunite Ling'er with her royal parents, as well as to restore peace to the land, would place them in the path of a deadly Black Miao cult, as well as its plot to conquer Nanzhao and thenceforth all of China.

=== Plot ===
Note: There are many subtle differences among the numerous versions of the game. The plot provided in this section is based on the original version for MS-DOS and Windows 95.

Xiaoyao's aunt suddenly falls gravely sick, and the young man sails to a nearby island, rumoured to be inhabited in recent years by "fairy ladies", to seek a cure. He finds a temple, where he is given a magical salve by a beautiful young maiden named Zhao Ling'er, and the two develop romantic feelings. Ling'er's nanny, the head sorceress, discovers Xiaoyao and inexplicably forces him to marry Ling'er and remain on the island forever. He manages to escape with the medicine and succeeds in healing his aunt.

However, he loses memory of his encounter on the island, after being tricked into consuming a potion of amnesia by some Black Miao warriors staying in the family inn. Things get worse when he finds Ling'er abducted by the Black Miao, who have massacred the islanders, but he defeats them and saves her. Despite not remembering their previous acquaintance, he decides to help accompany Ling'er in her search of her mother, who she thinks might still be alive, to her homeland Nanzhao.

The two arrive in Suzhou and runs into Lin Yueru, the spoiled daughter of a wealthy martial artist family, who stabs Xiaoyao after an altercation. Revived and healed by Ling'er's magic, they visit the city and chance upon a martial arts contest, where Xiaoyao is taunted into a fight with Yueru and defeats her, unexpectedly winning her hand in marriage (as the official purpose of the contest is to test potential suitors and find Yueru a husband whom she will accept). While Xiaoyao initially shows reluctance to marry Yueru, he eventually pretends to agree in order to avoid incurring her father's wrath, but plans to escape later.

On the planned wedding night, a serpent monster is sighted in the mansion while Ling'er disappears under mysterious circumstances. Xiaoyao and Yueru believe that Ling'er has been kidnapped by the monster, so they set off in search of her. After a series of adventures in the vicinity of Suzhou, the duo stumble upon twin villages plagued by a jiangshi outbreak. They are reunited with Ling'er, who was found passed out by the village doctor's daughter.

Soon after, Black Miao agents kidnap the doctor's daughter and demand Ling'er to meet them for negotiation. The group encounter an Elder of Nanzhao and are promptly defeated. The Elder then reveals he has come to retrieve Ling'er on behalf of her father, the shaman king of Nanzhao, who is terminally ill. Ling'er goes with the Black Miao in exchange for them sparing Xiaoyao and Yueru's lives.

The two pursue the trails of the Black Miao group, and soon happen upon them again when staying at a pub run by undercover White Miao. A scene of massive bloodshed ensues between the Miao groups, and a traumatized Ling'er reverts (again) to her true snake-bodied form. The grandmaster of Shushan is alerted to the events, and arrives from the sky on his sword; he assumes that Ling'er is responsible and takes her away.

With the help of Xiaoyao's old master, a friend of the grandmaster, the duo ends up in western Sichuan, where the Shushan School is based. They learn that Ling'er has been imprisoned in the base of the Demon Prison Tower, where no human has reached before. Xiaoyao and Yueru break into the tower and succeed in rescuing Ling'er after making a perilous descent to its base level. However, they are all crushed under the tower as it collapses due to their attempted escape.

Xiaoyao awakens and finds himself being nursed by a Miao grand shamaness, who finally reveals to Xiaoyao that Ling'er has been pregnant with his child all this time, and that Yueru has died from her wounds. Xiaoyao is deeply saddened by Yueru's death, but he puts aside his grief because he has a more important mission to complete: find two rare items which can save the lives of Ling'er and their unborn baby. In his quest he meets and befriends A'nu, a shamaness-in-training and the daughter of the White Miao chief, who tells him that the Miao region has been affected by a prolonged drought, the Kingdom of Nanzhao is in chaos, and the White and Black Miao are at war with each other over scarce resources.

After Xiaoyao finishes travelling back in time at the Nüwa Temple to retrieve the last of the five elemental pearls from his younger self in Yuhang, Ling'er recovers from childbirth, fulfils her destiny and assumes the mantle of a demigod descendant of Nüwa, and summons a rainstorm that restores peace to the Miao land. They then discover that the drought was actually caused by the evil Black Miao cult leader Baiyue, who has already murdered the Naozhao king, the father of Ling'er. The trio confront and appear to defeat him in a heated battle, but the crazed cleric summons a massive ancient water monster and merges with it. Ling'er sacrifices herself to destroy the abomination for good.

Xiaoyao is traumatized by the loss of both Ling'er and Yueru. He bids A'nu farewell and travels home alone. Just before he leaves, he sees Yueru, raised from the dead by the grand shamaness' "puppet bugs" and gu magic, carrying his child with Ling'er and waiting for his return among the snow.

== Gameplay ==
The game is a stereotypical adventure RPG where player's characters search through mazes in maps consisting of cities, dungeons, caves and wilderness. The game has no overland map; entry points to subsequent locations can always be found on the current location's screen. The story line is mostly linear, although side quests can be made available via conversation with NPCs, but they do not affect the story's progression. Once the player completes the quest associated with a particular location, there is usually no reason to return there. In most cases, return is impossible, because either the entrance is destroyed or the player travels to the next location via a game mechanic.

Combats can be initiated with plot conversations or when the characters come in contact with random visible enemies on the map. When the characters engage in combat, they are taken to a separate screen, where the battles are purely turn-based. Combatants with higher mobility amplitude will act first, and then actions alternate between the player characters and the enemies. The actions taken during battles mainly consist of normal physical attacks and magical spells. The players may also defend themselves or teammates, throw projectiles and use items, and steal from the enemies. Once the appropriate equipment is obtained, the player may also capture monsters to later turn them into beneficial items. The magic system contains the five elements of wind, lightning, ice (water), fire and earth, which form the descriptors for the offensive spells, each type able to counter another. There are also spells of special physical attacks not related to any elemental type.

The player's equipment is primarily upgraded through treasures looted in mazes and items purchased from shops. Defeating monsters usually make negligible contributions to the player's inventory, but it is the primary source of money. Healing and combat support items can be made from captured monsters as well as bought. The player can also make poison-based weapons using certain types of venomous insects as raw material.

== Development ==
The game was developed by the Kuangtu/Crazy Boys Production Team (狂徒製作群) of Softstar Entertainment, with concept work beginning as early as 1991. The group consisted at that time approximately 12 members, some being very young with little experience in game design. The Legend of Sword and Fairy was their first major RPG project. The production manager was Yao Zhuangxian (姚壯憲), who was 22 years old at the time. The game's music was composed by Lin Kunxin, whose most memorable titles include The Butterfly's Love (蝶戀), Martial Arts Contest for Marriage (比武招親), and Drunken Sword Master (酒劍仙). Lin Jiawen, a graphics artist on the team, was the major contributor to character portraits and animation. She also enthusiastically participated in the designing of the mazes, but her expertise in that area was limited.

Yao faced some turmoil in his love life during the game design process. This influenced him to integrate his own views of love into the game. Yao said, the three female protagonists are based on reality; Zhao Ling'er is like a wife; Lin Yueru is like a lover, and Anu is like a childhood friend. At some point, there arose a dispute regarding to the fate of two of the female characters in the end. In the finished game, this matter was intentionally made ambiguous where Lin is shown standing under a tree in the ending cinematic even though she is supposedly dead. Yao commented that he invested a great deal of feeling into the story, and the unclear ending was meant to leave events open to the players' imagination. In the years that followed the game's release in 1995, Yao did not wish to openly address questions regarding the game's ending. There was an anecdote about the ending: Yao was in favour of Zhao while another producer Xie Chonghui was preferred Lin. In Yao's blueprint of the whole game, the ending is that Lin's body is intact but her soul is destroyed while Zhao's body has disappeared but her soul exists. However, Xie disagreed with this setting. Eventually, this setting was broken by some final changes and the sequel indicated that Lin's body was preserved by a special type of insect.

== Reception ==
The Legend of Sword and Fairy has been praised as the pioneer of Chinese RPGs. It has deeply affected a whole generation of Chinese, and established a particular Chinese style of story-telling and maze-running RPG. Many Chinese consider it to be one of the most classic RPG games ever made.

In the first month following the game's release in Taiwan, The Legend of Sword and Fairy sold over 100,000 copies. Sales reached 350,000 copies in mainland China a month after the game's release there. The game's sales totalled about two million copies, but as many as 20 million copies may be in circulation due to piracy.

The Legend of Sword and Fairy won numerous awards. In 1995, the game won the Best Role Playing Game award from the magazine CEM STAR and the Golden Bag Game award (遊戯類金袋奖) from KING TITLE. The Legend of Sword and Fairy was also on the top of the Best PC Game List of the New Gaming Era (新遊戯時代) magazine until October 1996, for 14 consecutive months; and topped the "My Favourite Singleplayer PC Game" list in the Pop Software (大衆軟件) magazine for ten years.

The Legend of Sword and Fairy is best characterised as a very memorable tragedy. Its plot, especially the ending, has moved many players to tears. Zhao Ling'er's death and the question of whether or not Lin Yueru was successfully resurrected have fuelled an abundance of forum discussions and fan fiction. Yao Zhuangxian became reputed as the "Father of Xianjian", and many players reverently refer to him as "Immortal Yao".

Due to popular demand, the Kuangtu production team released New Legend of Sword and Fairy in 2001. Minor changes were made to the storyline; and the graphics was greatly improved using better technology (new visual effects, reproduced music, some additional storyline details, etc.). The most significant and most requested addition was two new hidden endings. The game's success eventually led to the creation of the subsequent titles in The Legend of Sword and Fairy series, even somewhat against Yao's wishes.

Famitsu magazine scored the Sega Saturn version of this game 6/6/4/5 for a total of 21.

== Versions ==
=== MS-DOS version ===
First released in 1995, it is often cited as the most successful video game in Taiwan and mainland China.

=== Windows 95 version ===
A re-release for the Windows 95 platforms. Some bugs (such as typos) in the former version were removed, and the overall difficulty reduced by simplification of map mazes. Additionally, three-dimensional AVI clips were introduced in place of the original static pictures. Also, the RIX music used in the DOS version was replaced with MIDI tracks.

=== Sega Saturn version ===
Softstar Entertainment obtained a Sega Saturn software development licence in 1995. The company subsequently spent more than a year adapting The Legend of Sword and Fairy for the console, becoming one of Sega's Taiwanese development partners. Softstar described the Saturn version, released in 1999, as Taiwan's first entirely domestically developed console game.

The Saturn version retained the original storyline while improving graphics for television display and adding a new opening sequence. The Chinese-language version was scheduled for release on February 5, 1999, with a Japanese version also planned. Softstar set a suggested retail price of NT$900, below the typical price of imported console games, and planned to combat piracy through promotional gifts and prize draws.

=== New version ===
This is a remake of the Windows 95 version using the Xuan-Yuan Sword 3 game engine, with improved graphics and minimal changes to the original story. Two alternate endings are dedicated to the two female protagonists of the story.

Initial release was in 2001, titled as New Legend of Sword and Fairy (simplified Chinese: 新仙剑奇侠传; traditional Chinese: 新仙劍奇俠傳), for the Windows 98 platform. It was re-released again as the New LSF XP version for the Windows XP platform.

=== SDLPal (Unofficial) ===
This open-source project created by enthusiasts aims to reimplement the main executable PAL.exe with SDL without using proprietary source code. As of 2022, it can run perfectly on Windows (Including x86_64 and ARM64 which was not supported in the original version), macOS, Linux, Unix, Android, iOS, 3DS/Wii (Hacked consoles only), Windows Phone, Xbox One/Series (Under developer mode) and more.

This project was used by Softstar Entertainment to create a modern port for Windows (Steam/CubeGame) and iOS.

== Spin-off games ==
=== The Xianjian Inn ===
A business simulation/adventure game released in 2001, which ended up a sleeper hit. The story is set in a lighthearted alternate universe based on the original game. The inn management portion of the game involves lodging and dining, and features day and night cycles with different available gameplay options. The female protagonists from the original game may also be taken on dates in the form of adventures in various locales.

=== Chinese Paladin Online ===
A MMORPG has been made and is currently in open beta in mainland China, Taiwan, Malaysia and Singapore.

== Live-action adaptations ==
- Chinese Paladin (仙剑奇侠传, 2005) — television series adapted by Chinese Entertainment Shanghai (later known as Tangren Media), starring Hu Ge (his breakout role), Liu Yifei and Ady An.
- Xianjian Inn (仙剑客栈, 2015) — comedy miniseries adapted from the spin-off business simulation game by Youku, incorporated with plotlines of the original game, starring Leo Wu, Sun Xuening, Xu Yue, Tong Keke and Kingdom Yuen
- Legend of Sword (仙剑奇侠传, 2015) — theater play by Ranspace Group, showing from April 15 to April 26 at the Shanghai Culture Plaza, starring Wen Zhuo, Tu Hua, Huang Xi and Ni Yan.
- Paladin Legend (又见逍遥, 2024) — web series adapted by Penguin Pictures, a subsidiary of Tencent Video, starring He Yu, Yang Yutong and Xu Hao.
- Sword and Fairy 1 (2024 by Director Yang Long) — 40 Episodes stream on Tencent WeTV

== See also ==
- Xuan-Yuan Sword
- Gujian Qitan
