= Softstar =

Taiwan video game company

Softstar Entertainment, Inc.
- Native name: 大宇資訊股份有限公司
- Romanized name: Da Yu Zi Xun Gu Fen You Xian Gong Si
- Type: Public
- Traded as: TPEx: 6111
- Founded: April 27, 1988 in Taipei, Taiwan
- Headquarters: New Taipei, Taiwan
- Products: Video games
- Number of employees: ca 300
- Website: www.softstar.com.tw www.softstar.com.tw/en/index.html

Softstar Entertainment Inc. (Chinese: 大宇資訊股份有限公司), abbreviated as Softstar (Chinese: 大宇資訊; pinyin: Dàyǔzīxùn), is a Taiwanese video game developer and publisher based in Zhonghe District, New Taipei, with Mainland subsidiary branches in Beijing, Shanghai, and Xiamen.

Softstar is famous among the Taiwan regions for designing and publishing Chinese language role-playing and puzzle/simulation games, mainly for the PC platform. Its most popular franchises include The Legend of Sword and Fairy series, Xuan-Yuan Sword series, Richman series, Stardom series, and Empire of Angels series.

== History ==
Softstar was Formerly known as Tianshuo Information Co., Ltd., the company was established on August 3, 1998, and changed its name to Softstar Entertainment Inc. on October 15 of the same year. From the company's predecessor (referred to as Ex-Softstar), the company acquired the assets and liabilities generated from its main businesses, assumed its existing R&D results and human resources, and continued its various business operations.
