= Sunü =

Figure in Chinese mythology

Sunü (Chinese: 素女; pinyin: Sùnǚ) is a figure in Chinese mythology known for music and sexual practices. She appears in early Chinese texts, including the Shiji and the Classic of Mountains and Seas. She also appears in texts about fangzhong shu (sexual cultivation).

== Music and sexual cultivation ==
The Shiji tells a story about Sunü and the se, a Chinese zither. Tai Di (太帝) ordered her to play a fifty-stringed se. Her music was so sad that Tai Di broke the instrument into two, making a twenty-five-stringed se.

The Classic of Mountains and Seas says that Sunü came from Duguang (都广). This passage is missing from some versions of the text.

Sunü also appears in the Su Nü Jing (素女经), a text on sexual practices and health. The original work has been lost, but parts of it survive in the Ishinpō, a Japanese medical book compiled by Tamba no Yasuyori in 984. The text contains a discussion between Sunü and the Yellow Emperor about sexual practices and health.

Sunü is mentioned in Zhang Heng's poem Tongsheng ge (同声歌). The poem describes a newly married woman who calls Sunü her teacher and praises her grace.

Sunü and Xuannü also appear in Daoist teachings about sexual practices. Their names are used in the term xuansu zhidao (玄素之道), meaning the "Way of Xuan and Su".

== White Water Sunü ==
Another story tells of Bai Shui Sunü (白水素女). In Soushen Houji, a young man named Xie Duan finds a large snail and takes it home. He later finds that someone has been cooking for him while he is away. One day, he returns early and sees a young woman come out of the snail shell.

The woman tells him that she is Bai Shui Sunü from the Milky Way. The Heavenly Emperor sent her to help Xie Duan because he was an orphan who lived a good life. Since Xie Duan has seen her, she must leave. She tells him to keep the shell for storing grain and then disappears during a storm.

Xie Duan later makes offerings to her. The story also mentions a shrine to Sunü beside a road.
