= Su Nü Jing =

Taoist sexology book

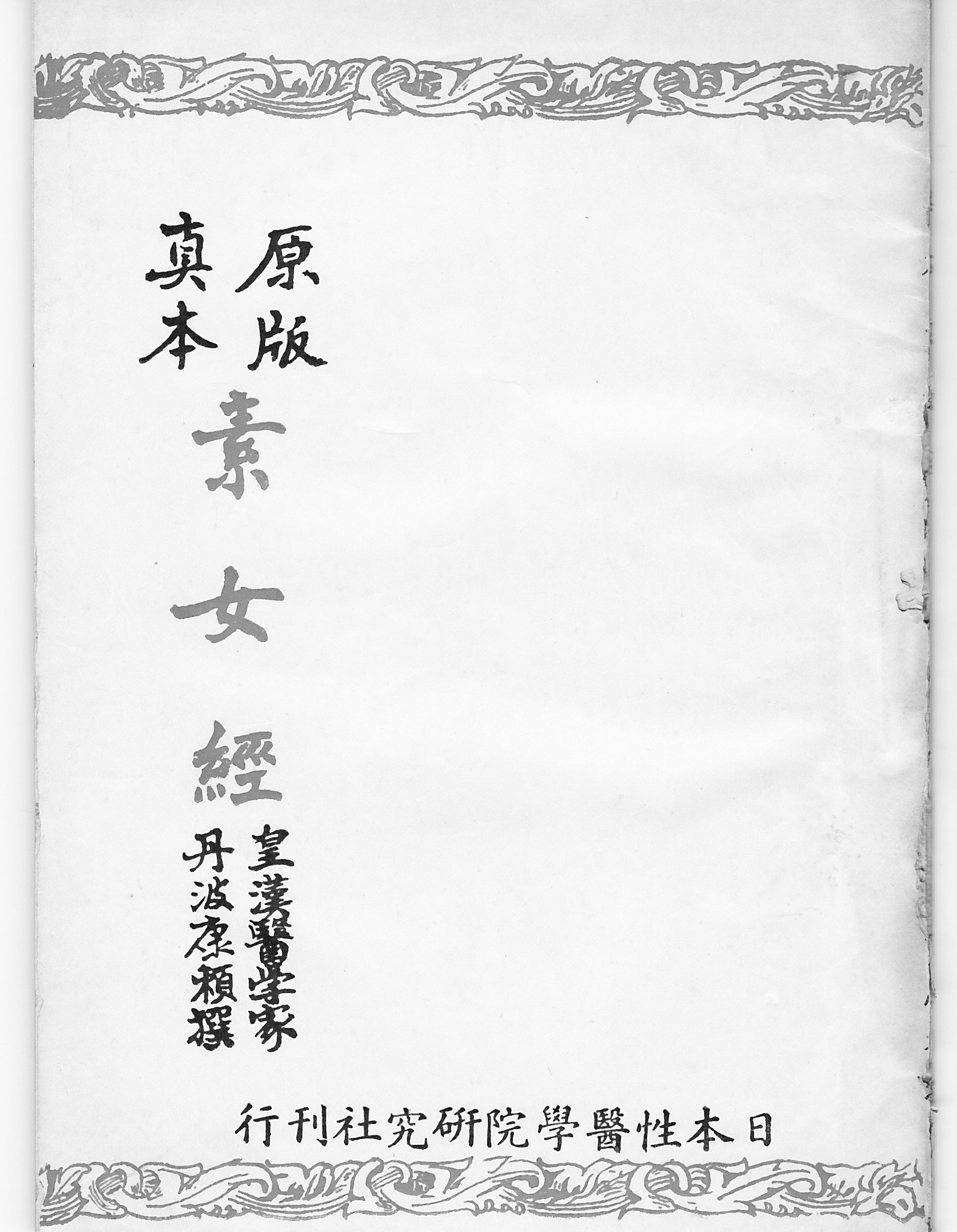
Su Nü Jing was published in 1920 in Japan

Sunü-jing "Classic of the Pure Woman" (Chinese: 素女經), is a Chinese sexology book thought to be written between the late Han Dynasty and the Three Kingdoms Period, around 27 - 260 C.E.

It belongs to the Chinese classics and presents the Taoist sexual practices. According to this religious tradition, the book is said to have been written by the goddess Sunü in the time of the Yellow Emperor, Huangdi.

== History ==
In China, this book was lost after Tang dynasty (~907 AD). However, copies of the text were collected in Japan in the Ishinpō of Tamba Yasara (醫心方), published in 982 by Ye Dehui, a Chinese publisher and scholar known to have an extensive collection of sexological works, and the current edition of the Sunü-jing is the version taken from the collection of Yasara.

Supposedly, there were three goddesses in the era of the Yellow Emperor: Sunü, Jiutian Xuannü, and Cainü; the three sisters taught the Emperor Daoist sexual practices and theory of sex, and practiced physically with him.The goddess Sunü takes the role of an expert and advisor in Sunüjing, providing advice to the Yellow Emperor. The Yellow Emperor, Huangdi, asks questions about sex and Sunü answers him. In addition to her knowledge of sexology and the Dao, Sunü was also said to be a very talented musician.

The name Su Nu is most often translated as “The White Girl” or “The Immaculate Girl” but it has been translated in many different ways.

== Content ==
The whole book can be divided into two parts. One part talks about the methods of sexual intercourse. There are 24 tricks in "Seven Losses", "Eight Benefits" and "Nine Methods"; the other parts are about recommended practices of intimacy and observations of sexual arousal, including the Five Signs, the Five Desires, Ten Movements and Nine Methods. The explanations for both men and women are very straightforward.

Sunüjing advises that during intercourse, it is men’s priority to delay ejaculation and it is women' s priority to achieve orgasm. Sunü explains that the more orgasms a man is able to give a woman, the greater spiritual benefits he will attain. The text instructs how a man should move to achieve this goal and what physical signs the woman will present when she is aroused. These are known as the Five Signs and the Ten Movements.

The Five Signs explain what a man should look for when initiating sexual intercourse relating to the physical complexion and body language of a woman. The Five Signs also suggests how a man should act to encourage arousal in a woman, including the pace of movement and the depth of penetration.

The Five Desires illustrates how a woman will show that she is aroused to her partner through her facial expression, movements, and mood. The Ten Movements describe the steps it takes for a woman to reach orgasm.

The Nine Methods describe nine sex positions that one should assume for the best preservation of energies. If each method is successfully performed, health benefits will be attained for both the man and the woman.

This book mainly is about Taoist sexual practices and health precautions. It teaches sex positions, skills, seasons and sex, psychology, pregnancy method, sexology theory and various other subjects. It is advocated that both men and women shall agree to make love, otherwise it is harmful to the body.

== Influence of Taoism ==
The influence of Taoism is seen through Sunü’s explanation of sexual intercourse as necessary for man and woman to achieve harmony between yin and yang. Yin and yang are cosmological forces that constantly interact to balance the universe, and can be associated with the female and the male, respectively. Abstinence from sex is also believed to be harmful in Taoism, as one is unable to strengthen their physical and spiritual energy through the exchange of cosmological forces. Abstaining from intercourse is said to be disrupting the natural cycles of yin and yang, and should be avoided. If one deviates from the advised sexual practices, yin and yang will be disrupted and it will result in poor health. Ejaculation is also said to reduce a man’s energies.
