= Jiutian Xuannü =

Goddess of war, sex, and longevity in Chinese mythology

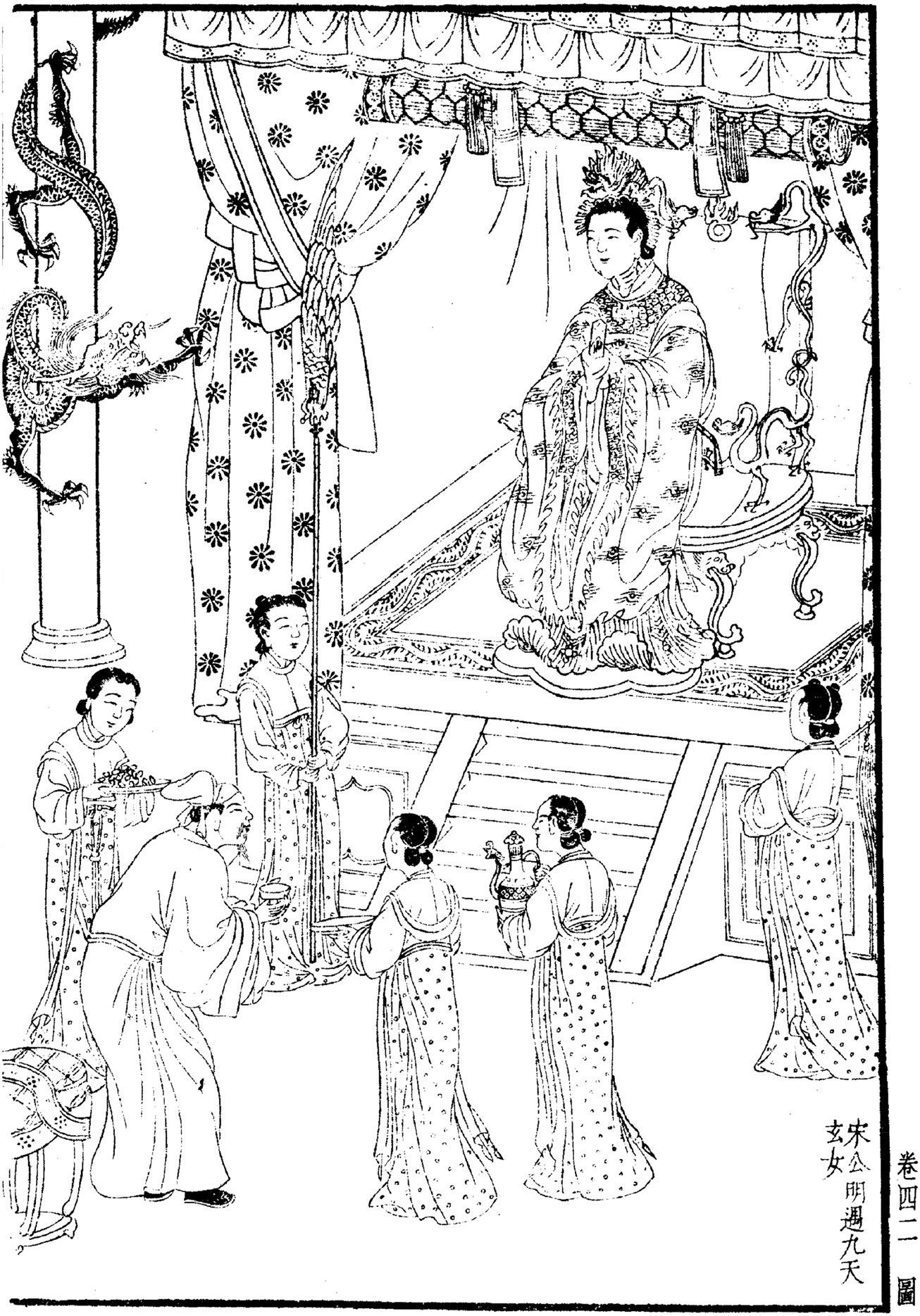
- Song Gongming encounters Jiutian Xuannü, woodblock print, published in the Rongyu Tang edition of the Water Margin
- Chinese: 九天玄女
- Literal meaning: Mysterious / Dark Lady of the Nine Heavens
Transcriptions
Standard Mandarin
- Hanyu Pinyin: Jiǔtiān Xuánnǚ
- Wade–Giles: Chiu-t'ien Hsuan-nu
Yue: Cantonese
- Jyutping: gau2 tin1 jyun4 neoi5
Southern Min
- Hokkien POJ: Kiú-thian Hiânlú

Jiutian Xuannü is the goddess of war, sex, and longevity in Chinese mythology. She was worshiped by the ancient Chinese and was gradually assimilated into Daoism, particularly during the Tang dynasty.

== Etymology ==
This goddess was initially known as Xuannü (玄女). The name is variously translated as the "Dark Lady" or the "Mysterious Lady". In the late Tang dynasty, the Daoist master Du Guangting (850–933) added Jiutian (九天), translated as "[of the] Nine Heavens", to create the title Jiutian Xuannü (九天玄女) for her.

She and Sunü are divine sisters. Both their names combined, as xuansu zhidao (玄素之道), signify the Daoist arts of the bedchamber.

== Stories ==
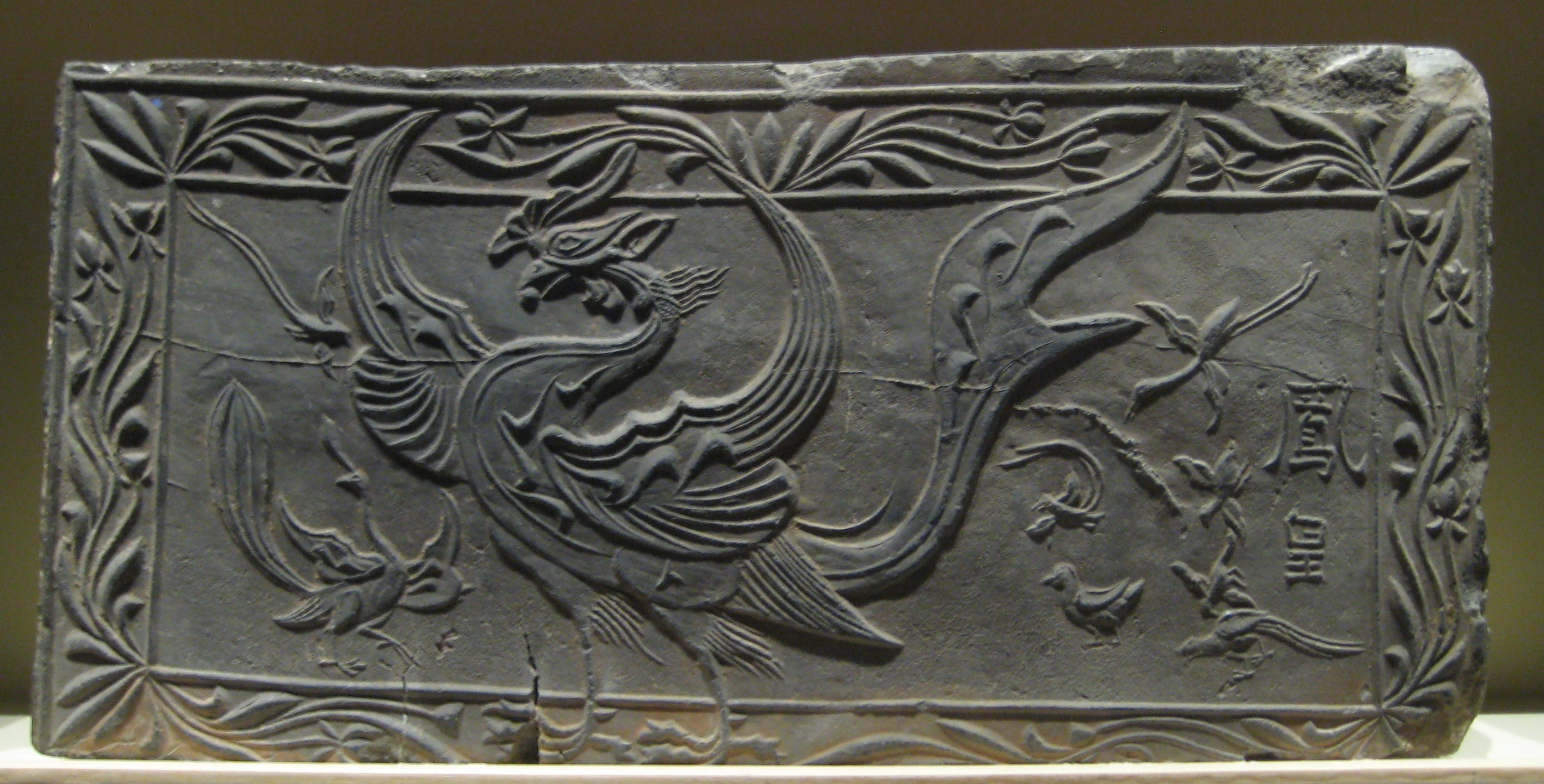
The goddess Jiutian Xuannü was known to ride a phoenix (type of creature depicted), holding phosphors and clouds as reins

The Yongcheng Jixian Lu (墉城集仙錄 (Note: Translated as "Records of the Assembled Transcendents of the Fortified Walled City" (Cahill 2013; Liu 2016))), written by the Daoist master Du Guangting (850–933), contains a biographical account of Jiutian Xuannü. It describes her as the teacher of Huangdi and the disciple of Xi Wangmu.

According to the text, Jiutian Xuannü appeared before Huangdi during his conflict with Chiyou. Chiyou had caused a great mist so impenetrable that it obscured day and night, which left Huangdi dwelling in the mist for several days. Jiutian Xuannü rode a cinnabar phoenix, holding phosphors and clouds as reins, into the great mist. She wore variegated kingfisher-feather garments of nine colors. Huangdi greeted her and received her command. Jiutian Xuannü said: "I base myself on the teachings of the Grand Supreme. If you have any doubts, you may question me." Huangdi responded: "[Chiyou] is cruelly crossing us. His poison is harming all the black-haired people. The four seas are sobbing. No one can protect his own nature or life. I want the art of winning a myriad victories in a myriad battles. Can I cut the harm facing my people?" Thereupon, the goddess bestowed various objects and artifacts. (Note: These items are specifically mentioned in the Yongcheng Jixian Lu. The list, providing the esoteric items, follows the translation in Liu (2016, 50–51): The Talismans of the Martial Tokens of the Six Jia Cyclicals and the Six Ren Cyclicals (六甲六壬兵信之符), The Book by which the Five Emperors of the Numinous Treasure Force Ghosts and Spirits into Service (靈寶五帝策使鬼神之書), The Seal of the Five Bright-Shiners for Regulating Demons and Communicating with Spirits (制妖通靈五明之印), The Formula of the Five Yin and Five Yang for Concealing the Jia Cyclicals (五陰五陽遁[甲]之式), Charts for Grabbing the Mechanism of Victory and Defeat of the Grand Unity from the Ten Essences and Four Spirits (太一十精四神勝負握機之圖), Charts of the Five Marchmounts and the Four Holy Rivers (五[嶽]河圖), and Instructions in the Essentials of Divining Slips (策精之訣). Cahill (2013, 95) provides a translation of a longer list.) This enabled Huangdi to defeat Chiyou and ascend to heaven.

== Associations ==
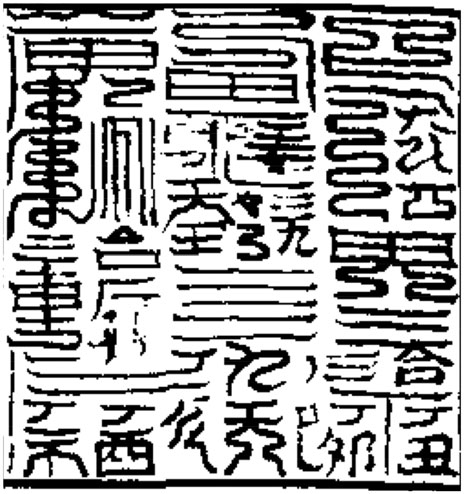
The seal of Jiutian Xuannü, as depicted in the Lingbao Liuding Mifa

=== Warfare ===
The association of this goddess with warfare is derived from the Longyu Hetu (龍魚河圖 (Note: Translated as "Chart of the River of the Dragon-Fish" (Liu 2016))), presumably produced during the Xin dynasty. This text describes the manifestation of the goddess herself in front of Huangdi (黃帝) during his conflict against Chiyou (蚩尤):

"The Yellow Emperor came into power. Chiyou and his brothers, a total of 80 people, all had the bodies of beasts and spoke like human beings; they had bronze heads and iron foreheads. They ate sand and rocks, built military weapons, and intimidated the world. They killed at will and without principle, showing no mercy. The Yellow Emperor governed the state, and he looked at the sky and sighed. Heaven dispatched the Mysterious Woman down to earth to deliver military messages and sacred talismans to the Yellow Emperor, enabling him to subjugate Chiyou. The returning statesman (the Yellow Emperor) therefore used them to suppress the enemy and seized control of the eight directions."
「黃帝攝政。蚩尤兄弟八十人，並獸身人語，銅頭鐵額。食沙石，造兵杖，威震天下。誅殺無道，不仁不慈。黃帝行天下，仰事天而歎。天遣玄女下，授黃帝兵信神符， 而令制伏蚩尤，歸臣因使鎮兵以制八方。」

Her intervention in warfare is a common narrative in Daoist texts, such as in texts from the Zhongshu Bu (眾術部 (Note: Translated as "The Section of Miscellaneous Magic" (Liu 2016))) in the Daozang (道藏 (Note: Translated as "Daoist Canon" (Liu 2016))).

=== Martial magic ===
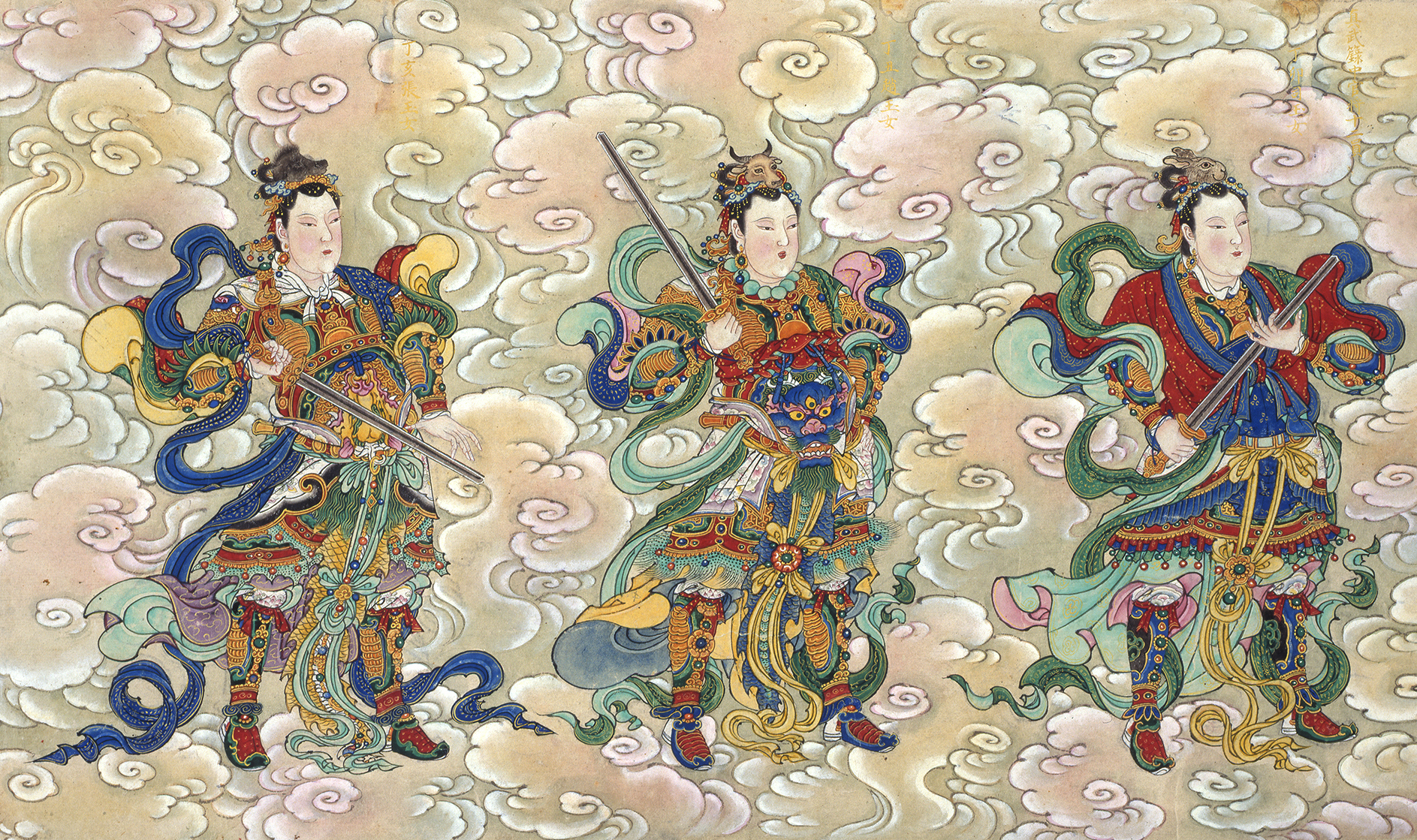
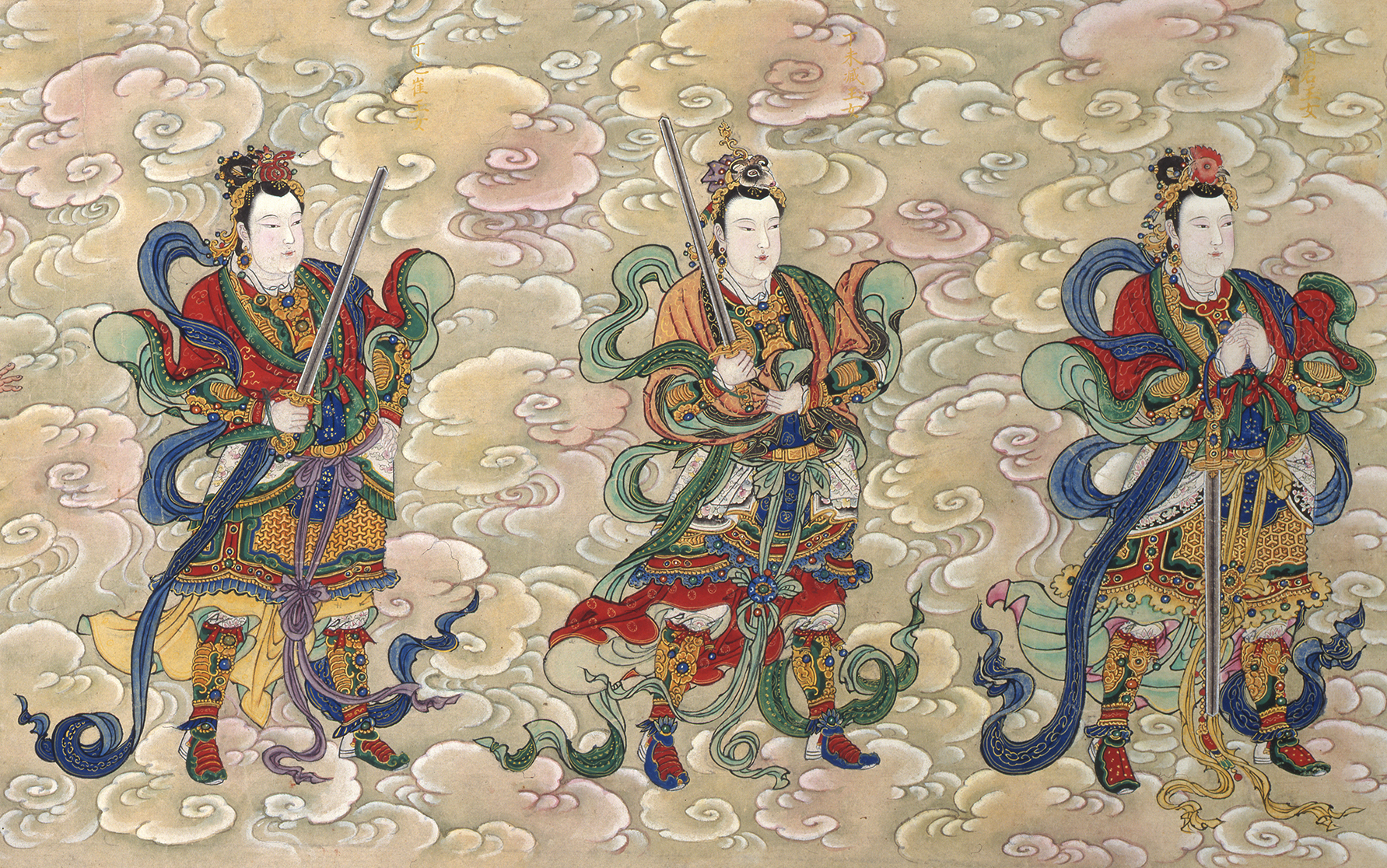
The six Jade Maidens, as depicted in The Ordination of Empress Zhang (detail)

A set of Daoist texts, produced after the Tang dynasty, associates the goddess with magical capabilities, such as the skill of invisibility (隱身) and the method of mobilizing the stars of the Northern Dipper to protect the state. The Lingbao Liuding Mifa (靈寶六丁秘法 (Note: Translated as "Secret Lingbao Method Concerning the Spirits of the Six Ding Days" (Liu 2016))) specifies that Jiutian Xuannü's magic is martial in origin.

Jiutian Xuannü has the ability to magically conceal the body and her power is exercised through the Six Ding Jade Maidens (六丁玉女) who are her acolytes. According to the Lingbao Liuding Mifa, the Jade Maidens perform specific tasks during the concealment: the Jade Maiden of Dingmao (丁卯玉女) conceals one's physical body, the Jade Maiden of Dingsi (丁巳玉女) conceals one's destiny, the Jade Maiden of Dinghai (丁亥玉女) conceals one's fortune, the Jade Maiden of Dingyou (丁酉玉女) conceals one's hun soul, the Jade Maiden of Dingwei (丁未玉女) conceals one's po soul, and the Jade Maiden of Dingchou (丁丑玉女) conceals one's spirit. Achieving invisibility is seen as a military strategy to defeat enemies and protect the state, as the text claims that practitioners must first learn to conceal their bodies if they hope to expel evil and return to righteousness. The goddess and the six maidens together represent the yin force in the universe, which is the means to concealment of the body. Herein, their magic and their femininity are intertwined with each other.

The Micang Tongxuan Bianhua Liuyin Dongwei Dunjia Zhenjing (秘藏通玄變化六陰洞微遁甲真經 (Note: Translated as "Book of the Six Yin of the Sublime Grotto, Veritable Scripture of the Hidden Days" (Liu 2016))), written in the early Northern Song period, gives an incantation associated with Jiutian Xuannü. By reciting this incantation and performing the paces of Yu (禹步), invisibility to others was said to be achieved. In the Baopuzi (抱朴子 (Note: Translated as "Book of the Master Who Embraces Simplicity" (Liu 2016) or "Master of the Uncarved Block" (Cahill 2013))), written by Ge Hong (b. 283), the paces of Yu are described as elements of the divinatory system of dunjia (遁甲, translated "Hidden Stem") from which the immediate position in the space-time structure of the six ding could be calculated. The six ding are the spirits who are responsible for the position of the irregular gate (奇門), which represents a rift in the universe. The irregular gate must be approached by performing the paces of Yu and serves as the entrance to the emptiness of the otherworld in which invisibility to evil influences is achieved.

The Beidou Zhifa Wuwei Jing (北斗治法武威經 (Note: Translated as "The Scripture of Martial Power, of the Method of Government of the Northern Dipper" (Liu 2016))) states that Jiutian Xuannü taught the method to mobilize the stars of the Northern Dipper to Yuan Qing (遠清), an official during the transition from the Sui to the Tang dynasty. The method is known as Beidou Shi'er Xing (北斗十二星, translated "Twelve Stars of the Northern Dipper"). The Shangqing Tianxin Zhengfa (上清天心正法 (Note: Translated as "Correct Method of the Heart of Heaven, of the Shangqing Tradition" (Liu 2016))), produced in the Southern Song period, gives an incantation entitled Tiangang Shenzhou (天罡神咒, translated "Incantation of the Heavenly Mainstay") that accompanies the method.

=== Longevity ===
The goddess Jiutian Xuannü appears in several works of physiological microcosmology (Note: As Cahill (2013) terms it) in which the human body is seen as a microcosm of the universe and where the gods are present within. These texts locate Jiutian Xuannü along the central median of the body and associate her with the circulation of breath, which nourishes the vital spirit and provides longevity.

Jiutian Xuannü appears at least three times in the Huangting Jing (黃庭經 (Note: Translated as "Classic of the Yellow Courtyard" (Cahill 2013))), where the adept is instructed to send down his breath to enter the goddess' mouth.

The Taishang Laojun Zhongjing (太上老君中經 (Note: Translated as "Central Classic of Lord Lao from the Supreme Realm" (Cahill 2013))), probably dating to the 5th century, mentions that she is "located between the kidneys, dressed only in the white of Venus and the brilliant stars. Her pearl of Great Brilliance shines to illuminate the inside of the adept's whole body, so that he can extend his years and not die."

In the Laozi Zhongjing (老子中經 (Note: Translated as "Central Classic of Laozi" (Cahill 2013))), Jiutian Xuannü is described as one of the three deities who are sitting on divine tortoises. The text states: "The Mysterious Woman is the mother of the Way of the void and nothingness." It gives instructions to adepts: "Close your eyes and meditate on a white breath between your shoulders. In its centre is a white tortoise. On top of the tortoise is the Mysterious Woman." There are two governors beside her, which adepts are instructed to summon by saying: "Governor of Destiny and Governor of the Registers, pare so-and-so's name from the death list and inscribe it on the Life List of the Jade Calendar." This ritual therefore points to a procedure in which a long life is promised.

Since the 3rd century AD, Jiutian Xuannü has been associated with alchemy. In Ge Hong's Baopuzi, it is noted that the goddess Jiutian Xuannü helps prepare elixirs with other deities, that adepts erected altars to the goddess when they create elixirs of metal, and that she had discussed calisthenics and diet with Huangdi. During the Song dynasty, the goddess was closely associated with neidan (inner alchemy).

=== Sexuality ===
While most books bearing Jiutian Xuannü's name were about warfare, books that focus on her link to sexuality also exist. The Xuannü Jing (玄女經 (Note: Translated as "Mysterious Woman Classic" (Cahill 2013))) and the Sunü Jing (素女經 (Note: Translated as "Natural Woman Classic" (Cahill 2013))), both dating to the Han dynasty, were handbooks in dialogue form about sex. Texts from the Xuannü Jing have been partly incorporated into the Sui dynasty edition of the Sunü Jing. From the Han dynasty onwards, these handbooks would be familiar to the upper class. On the other side, during the Han dynasty, Wang Chong had criticized the sexual arts as "not only harming the body but infringing upon the nature of man and woman."

During the Tang dynasty and earlier periods, Jiutian Xuannü was often associated with the sexual arts. The Xuannü Jing remained a familiar work among the literati during the Sui and Tang dynasties. The Dongxuanzi Fangzhong Shu (洞玄子房中術 (Note: Translated as "Bedchamber Arts of the Master of the Grotto Mysteries" (Cahill 2013))), which was likely written by the 7th-century poet Liu Zongyuan, contains explicit descriptions of the sexual arts that was supposedly transmitted from Jiutian Xuannü.

The sexual practices that Jiutian Xuannü supposedly taught were often compared to alchemy and physiological procedures for prolonging life. In Ge Hong's Baopuzi, there's a passage in which Jiutian Xuannü tells Huangdi that sexual techniques are "like the intermingling of water and fire—it can kill or bring new life depending upon whether or not one uses the correct methods."

== Development ==
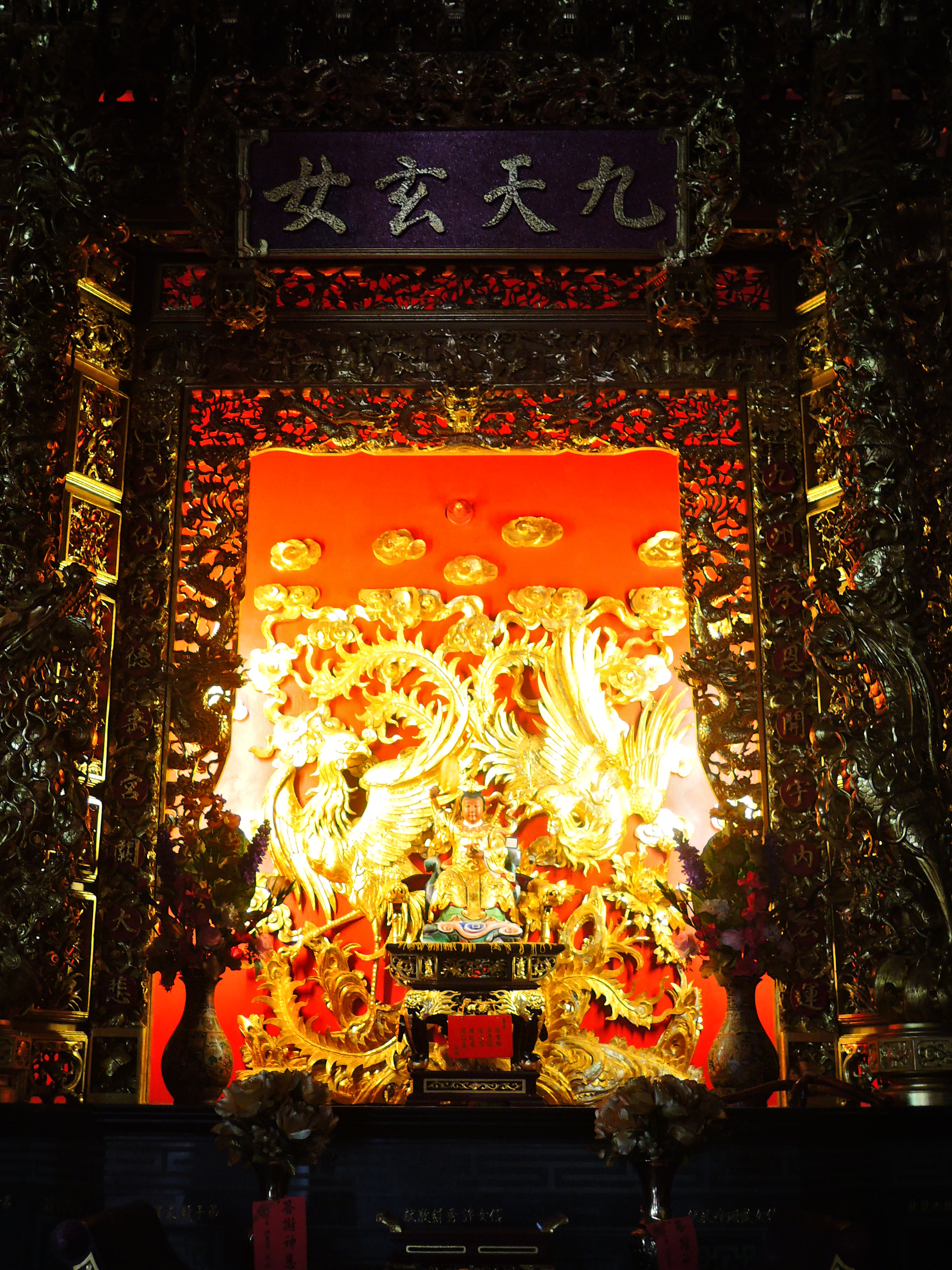
Altar to Jiutian Xuannü at the Baikeng Yusheng Temple in Huxi Township on the Penghu Islands

The goddess Jiutian Xuannü was actively worshiped by the ancient Chinese, but the extent of the worship diminished after the Han dynasty. Over the following centuries, she was gradually assimilated into Daoism. During the Tang dynasty, contrary views about Jiutian Xuannü coexisted. In this period, the rise of Daoism gave way to a new imagery of a high goddess of war who won by magical and intellectual means, and who transmitted the arts of immortality. The aspects of sexuality, victory over enemies in warfare, and everlasting life was slowly modified to fit this new image. Moreover, the Daoist Du Guangting attempted to expunge all the heterodox and crude elements from Jiutian Xuannü's popular legends, such as the erotic and sexually-empowering nature of the goddess, to create a new image of a martial goddess that was appropriate for the Shangqing school of Daoism.

In the Ming dynasty, Jiutian Xuannü officially became a celestial protectress and was venerated as a tutelary goddess of the state. In 1493, Empress Zhang (1470–1541), who was the wife of the Hongzhi Emperor, was ordained and her ordination was certified in a scroll entitled The Ordination of Empress Zhang, which contains numerous images of deities (but not Jiutian Xuannü) and an inscription composed by the Daoist master Zhang Xuanqing (張玄慶, d. 1509) of the Zhengyi school. This inscription ranks Jiutian Xuannü above all other celestial warriors by placing her ahead of the divine categories Generals, Marshals, Heavenly Soldiers, the Six Ding Jade Maidens, and the Six Jia Generals. Furthermore, it granted her the expanded official title Jiutian Zhanxie Huzheng Xuannü (九天斬邪護正玄女, translated "Dark Lady of the Nine Heavens who Slays Evil and Protects Righteousness"). The Lingbao Liuding Mifa associates the phrase "slaying evil and protecting righteousness" (斬邪護正) with the goddess and emphasizes that "in order to slay evil and return to righteousness, one first needs to know how to become invisible" (斬邪歸正，先須知隱形).

The veneration and elevation of Jiutian Xuannü may have had an underlying political rationale, as it positioned an aristocratic family over another. The relationship of Empress Zhang and Jiutian Xuannü closely paralleled the relationship of the Ming emperors and Xuanwu, another important deity in Daoism, which promoted the empress and her family's position in the imperial court. This was during a time of strife between the Zhang family and Zhou family (of Empress Dowager Zhou, the grandmother of the Hongzhi Emperor), the latter who adhered to Buddhism. Jiutian Xiannü is a fertility goddess, which also may have contributed to Empress Zhang's worship of the deity.

== Appearance ==
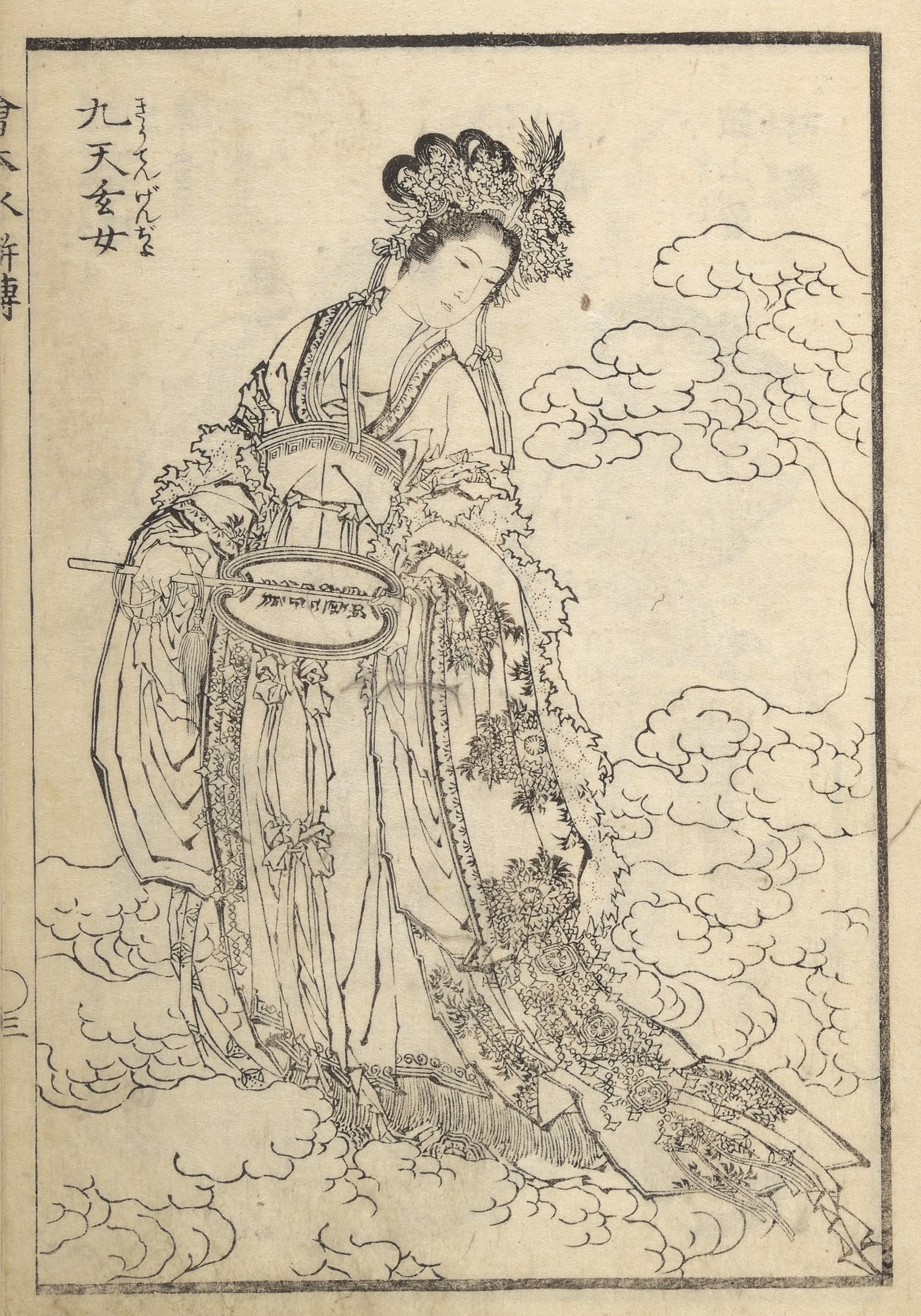
Jiutian Xuannü as depicted in a 1829 Japanese picture book of the Water Margin

In the Taishang Laojun Zhongjing, Jiutian Xuannü is described as being dressed only in the white of Venus and the brilliant stars, with her pearl of Great Brilliance shining in illumination. When Jiutian Xuannü appeared before Huangdi as narrated in the Yongcheng Jixian Lu, she wore variegated kingfisher-feather garments of nine colors and rode a cinnabar phoenix with phosphors and clouds as reins.

The physical appearance of Jiutian Xuannü has been described in a poem that appears in the Rongyu Tang (容與堂) edition of the novel Water Margin (published in the Ming dynasty):

"On her head, she has a nine-dragon and flying phoenix topknot, and on her body she wears a red silken gown decorated with golden thread; blue jade-like strips run down the long gown and a white jade ritual object rises above her colored sleeves. Her face is like a lotus calyx and her eyebrows fit naturally with her hair. Her lips are like cherries, and her snow-white body appears elegant and relaxed. She appears to be the Queen Mother who hosts a saturn peach banquet, but she also looks like Chang'e who resides in the moon palace. Her gorgeous immortal face cannot be depicted, nor can the image of her majestic body."
「頭綰九龍飛鳳髻，身穿金縷絳綃衣，藍田玉帶曳長裾，白玉圭璋擎彩袖。臉如蓮萼，天然眉目映雲環﹔脣似櫻桃，自在規模端雪體。猶如王母宴蟠桃，卻似嫦娥居月殿。正大仙容描不就，威嚴形像畫難成。」

== Popular culture ==
Jiutian Xuannü appears as a character in the 2007 Hong Kong film It's a Wonderful Life, the 1980s Chinese television series Outlaws of the Marsh, and the 1985 Hong Kong television series The Yang's Saga.

She is featured in the mobile game Tower of Saviors. She makes an appearance in the video games The Legend of Sword and Fairy 4 and The Legend of Sword and Fairy 7.

== Bibliography ==
- Birrell, Anne (1993). Chinese Mythology: An Introduction. Baltimore: Johns Hopkins University Press. ISBN 0-8018-4595-5.
- Cahill, Suzanne E. (2013). "Sublimation in Medieval China: The Case of the Mysterious Woman of the Nine Heavens". Journal of Chinese Religions. 20 (1): 91–102. doi:10.1179/073776992805307692.
- Liu, Peng (2016). ""Conceal my Body so that I can Protect the State": The Making of the Mysterious Woman in Daoism and Water Margin". Ming Studies. 2016 (74): 48–71. doi:10.1080/0147037X.2016.1228876. S2CID 164447144.
- Wen, Benebell (2016). The Tao Of Craft: Fu Talismans and Casting Sigils in the Eastern Esoteric Tradition. Berkeley: North Atlantic Books. ISBN 9781623170660.
