= Cockroaches in popular culture =

Because of their long, persistent association with humans, cockroaches are frequently referred to in art, literature, folk tales, and theater and film. In Western culture, cockroaches are often depicted as vile and dirty pests. Their size, long antennae, shiny appearance and spiny legs make them disgusting to many humans, sometimes even to the point of phobic responses.

For on-screen moments, television series and films often employ the Madagascar hissing cockroach due to its large size and relatively slow speed.

== In film ==
- Gagamboy — Dodoy, a rival vendor of Junie, is transformed into a humanoid cockroach after accidentally eating a cockroach that had been exposed to chemicals.
- Joe's Apartment — The insects are cheerful, swinging party-goers who help the titular human hero.
- Twilight of the Cockroaches — A hybrid anime/live-action Japanese film featuring a society of anthropomorphic cockroaches living in a bachelor's apartment that faces extermination when a cockroach-phobic woman moves in.
- Creepshow — Swarms of cochroaches terrorize a cantankerous and verminophobic old man in the segment, "They're Creeping Up On You."
- Damnation Alley — A post-apocalyptic Salt Lake City, Utah is infected with a four-inch long, flesh-eating mutant cockroach (played by the Madagascar hissing cockroach).
- Mimic — Diseased cockroaches are the target of the genetically altered titular species.
- Bug — After his wife Carrie dies from having an insect crawl in her hair, Professor James Parmiter becomes obsessed with the insect and successfully breeds the new species with the cockroach, creating a hybrid species that is intelligent and capable of flight.
- Desperate Living — Peggy Gravel and Grizelda Brown are forced to eat cockroaches when having dinner with Queen Carlotta.
- Mouse Hunt — Ernie is forced to close his restaurant due to a cockroach infestation.
- Men in Black — The Bug is an insectoid alien who kills a farmer named Edgar and utilizes his skin as a disguise.
- Monsters vs. Aliens — Dr. Cockroach is a scientist with the head of a cockroach.
- An American Tail — Warren T. Rat carries with him a cockroach named Digit whom he forces to count his money and frequently abuses, even threatening to eat him at one point.
- A Bug's Life — A cockroach appears as a waitress in one scene yelling out, "Hey! Who ordered the Poo-Poo platter?"
- Godzilla vs. Gigan — King Ghidorah and Gigan are controlled remotely by Nebulans, an alien race of giant cockroaches that inherited a waste planet after the dominant species on it polluted it into oblivion.
- Scarface (1983) — Tony Montana refers to Gaspar Gomez and the Diaz Brothers, rival gang leaders to Frank Lopez, as cockroaches.
- Pacific Heights — Carter Hayes breeds and releases cockroaches in his apartment as part of his plan against the landlords.
- A Nightmare on Elm Street 4: The Dream Master — Freddy Krueger kills Debbie by transforming her into a cockroach and crushing her.
- WALL-E — WALL-E keeps a cockroach as his pet.
- West Side Story — In both the Broadway musical (1957) and film (1961), the Jets, the Anglo-American gang, refers to the Sharks, the Puerto Rican gang, as cockroaches.
- Enchanted — Cockroaches (and other pests) assist a princess with housecleaning duties such as scrubbing the bathtub.
- Oggy and the Cockroaches: The Movie — Features three fictional cockroaches. Joey, Dee Dee and Marky are featured in more antagonistic roles as Oggy ventures through a variety of timelines.
- The Nest
- Despicable Me 4 — Maxime Le Mal transforms himself into a cockroach hybrid and does the same to a gas station employee and Gru's son, Gru Jr.
- Goat — Will Harris gets startled by a cockroach greeting him at his friend's place. The next day he unintentionally insults the cockroach community and needs to apologize on live Q&A.

== In politics ==
- In India in May 2026, after the Chief Justice of India described unemployed youth as "cockroaches" and "parasites of society", the term was reclaimed by supporters of the Cockroach Janta Party, a satirical political party.

== In television ==
- In The X-Files episode "War of the Coprophages", cockroaches are seen to group together to murder people. The character Dr. Berenbaum suggests that swarms of cockroaches are responsible for most UFO sightings because they can generate an electrostatic field which can be illuminated dependent on atmospheric conditions.
- In the ALF episode "La Cucharacha", Alf inadvertently releases a cockroach-like alien from his home planet in the house. When it is sprayed with insecticide, it grows bigger until it is large enough to eat him. Alf discovers by accident that the creature can be harmed and killed by perfume.
- The television series Freaky Stories was hosted by a cockroach named Larry.
- In "Transform and Roll Out", the first episode of Transformers Animated, an experiment on a cockroach goes wrong, causing it to grow and absorb everything in its path.
- In the television show King of the Hill, the character Dale Gribble has been shown as a breeder of cockroaches. He attempts to breed a colony of Madagascar hissing cockroaches to do his bidding, theorizing that they will believe he is their mother and obey if he is the first thing they see when they hatch.
- In the series Heroes, cockroaches are often shown near the main antagonist of the series, Sylar. The series' creator Tim Kring has stated that, because of their ability to survive and adapt so well, cockroaches present the embodiment of evolution to him, so he included them because of the show's evolutionary theme.
- In The Cosby Show, Theo's friend is nicknamed Cockroach.
- In the Family Guy episode "Screwed the Pooch", Brian Griffin encounters two giant roaches in gang attire at the motel he is staying at.
- Oggy and the Cockroaches features three anthropomorphic cockroaches in the main cast of characters. Their names are Dee Dee, Joey and Marky. They frequently mess with Oggy and Jack, with Joey as the leader, Dee Dee as the glutton, and Marky as the mischievous assistant.
- In The Powerpuff Girls episode "Insect Inside", an evil man named Roach Coach possesses a swarm of cockroaches as his pets and uses them to attack and rule the City of Townsville. After his defeat, Roach Coach is revealed to be a sentient cockroach who controls a mech resembling a human.
- In the Courage the Cowardly Dog episode, "Courage in the Big Stinkin' City", the Bagges arrive at New York City and meets a shady giant cockroach named Schwick.
- In Yin Yang Yo!, one of the main antagonists in the series is Carl the Evil Cockroach Wizard.
- In the Teenage Mutant Ninja Turtles episode "Cockroach Terminator", Donatello installs cameras on cockroaches to use as spying devices. One of the cockroaches falls into a vat of mutagen, transforming it into a giant cybernetic form.
- HaChartzufim, the Israeli version of the British satirical puppet series Spitting Image, has recurring sketches about a family of cockroaches living under Sara Netanyahu's sink.

== In written works ==
- In Franz Kafka's story The Metamorphosis, the character Gregor Samsa awakes to find himself transformed into a giant "vermin." Although the type of bug Gregor changes into is not specified, the physical description offered implies that it is a cockroach. This novel has been parodied in various ways, including at least two other published works: Marc Estrin's 2002 Insect Dreams: The Half Life of Gregor Samsa, where Gregor Samsa prospers despite his transformation, becoming an important figure in society, and Tyler Knox's 2006 noir comedy Kockroach in which a cockroach wakes up one morning as a human and becomes a leading gangster in Times Square during the 1950s.
- Daniel Evan Weiss's novel The Roaches Have No King tells the story of a humanized colony of cockroaches, who swear revenge against their hosts for renovating the kitchen and thus preventing easy access to food supplies.
- Shoebag, a children's book by M.E. Kerr, centers around the cockroach character Shoebag, who awakens to find himself transformed as a human.
- In Arabic and other eastern societies, sometimes a traditional method to protect books and scrolls was a metaphysical appeal to "Kabi:Kaj" (كبيبكج/كَبِيكَج), the "King of the Cockroaches". After hearing an appeal to the king to protect a manuscript, cockroaches of less nobility (or lesser insects) would refrain from intruding on documents which could be eaten by the king only. Since many manuscripts were made with fish-glue, starch-paste, leather, and other edible substances, insect appetites were a constant problem to Arabic books and scrolls. A similar technique from Syria was to name the first and last page of a document or manuscript "The Page of the King of the Cockroaches", in the hope that the Cockroach King would control all other insects. Translated appeals include "O Kabi:kaj, save the paper!", "O Kabi:kaj, save this book from the worms!" and "O Kabi:kaj, do not eat this paper!" "In Maghribi manuscripts, the word appears in its evidently corrupt form, Kaykataj and is clearly used as a talisman... and mentions, after a certain Muhammad al-Samiri, that when one writes Kaytataj on the first and last folio of the book, one can be sure that worms will not attack it."
- Along with rats, cockroaches are frequently seen infesting various locations in Steve Purcell's comic book series Sam & Max, and one storyline features a race of gigantic cockroaches living on the moon.
- Archy the cockroach is a sympathetic writer and chronicler in a classic series of newspaper columns by Don Marquis.
- In Revolt of the Cockroach People, an autobiographical novel by Oscar Zeta Acosta, cockroaches are used as a metaphor for oppressed and downtrodden minorities in US society in the 1960s and 1970s, particularly Mexican-Americans. There are several references to the folk song La Cucaracha throughout the novel.
- In Vertigo comics' The Exterminators the main villain is a breed of cockroaches named Mayan Hissers, being responsible for "destroying" Mayan civilization.
- Milquetoast the Cockroach was a character in the comic strips Bloom County and Outland by Berkeley Breathed.
- In the young adult fiction series Gregor the Overlander by Suzanne Collins there are giant cockroaches beneath the Earth that are shy and emotional and help Gregor on his Quest. They are perceived by the other people under the Earth (Underlanders) as slow, weak, and cowardly things, but prove to be loyal to their allies and wiser than they appear.
- In the comic series Badger there is a villain known as the Roach Wrangler, who holds supernatural control over an army of cockroaches.
- In the manga series Terra Formars, giant mutated humanoid cockroaches with incredible physical strength are the main antagonists.
- The second in the Harry Hole crime novel series by Norwegian writer Jo Nesbø is entitled Cockroaches, with cockroaches used here as a metaphor for the murky Thai underworld into which the protagonist must plunge.
- Naked Lunch — the main character, William Lee's "case worker" appears to him in the form of large cockroach that speaks through a hole in its abdomen. Later, this cockroach appears again as a hybrid of a cockroach/typewriter that has a keypad on its face. The case worker reveals his name as "Clark Nova", which also happens to be the name of Lee's typewriter model.
- In the independent 1980s comic book series Domino Chance, both the title character and his sidekick Arnie are space-faring anthropomorphic cockroaches.
- In Carmen Agra Deedy's retelling of the Cuban folktale, Martina the Beautiful Cockroach tells the story of a green banana cockroach looking at marriage candidates to find love.
- In Clarice Lispector’s 1968 novel The Passion According to G.H., a woman (G.H.) experiences an encounter with a cockroach that changes her perception of herself as a human being.

== In video games ==
- In Bad Mojo, which is subtitled "The Roach Game" and loosely based on Franz Kafka's The Metamorphosis, the player takes on the role of a person turned into a cockroach. Other cockroaches provide the player with clues throughout the game.
- Fallout 3, Fallout: New Vegas, Fallout 4, and Fallout 76 have a mutant form of the American cockroach called the Radroach. It is about the size of a house cat and is hostile towards the player if encountered.
- In the Silent Hill series of games, monsters resembling cockroaches are featured in some enclosed spaces.
- Cockroaches may be combined with other creatures in Impossible Creatures. Half-cockroaches can be used to spread the plague or defile an area of land, spreading disease to enemy creatures that cross the defiled land.
- Half-Life allows the main character to crush cockroaches.
- The character Sal in Sam & Max: The Devil's Playhouse is an anthropomorphic cockroach the size of a human. Smaller cockroaches also appear in the series.
- In the real-time strategy game StarCraft II, Zerg forces feature a unit known as the Roach, although taxonomically this creature has no relation to actual cockroaches.
- In Space Station 13, cockroaches are mostly passive critters roaming in dirty corners of the station. Depending on the server's codebase, they can vary from being a playable critter or humanoid race, having aggressive variants or be used for gene infusion.
- In Call of Duty: Modern Warfare 2, one of the main protagonists, Gary Sanderson is nicknamed "Roach".
- In every game in the Animal Crossing series, cockroaches can appear as household pests if the player character has not entered their house for a while. The roaches will increase in number the longer the player leaves their house unattended and can be crushed. In Animal Crossing and Animal Crossing: Wild World, cockroaches can be caught, donated to the Museum, and sold for five Bells (the game's form of currency). In Animal Crossing: City Folk and Animal Crossing: New Leaf, a congratulatory message is played after clearing a room of cockroaches.
- In Resident Evil 5, the Reaper is a Biological Organic Weapon formed by cockroaches mutated by Uroboros virus. They have sharp legs which can pierce their prey as well as high agility.
- Pokémon Sun and Moon introduces a Pokémon based on a cockroach called Pheromosa. Unusually for depictions of cockroaches and creatures based on them, Pheromosa is extremely frail.
- When Weaver uses his swarm ability in DOTA 2, a special effect appears around enemy players with cockroach still images.
- In Deadlock, the player can kill cockroaches for 1 soul in the city's tunnel system.
- In Mycopunk, the mission control is a cockroach named Roachard.

== In music ==
- "La Cucaracha" ("The Cockroach") is a popular Mexican folk song.
- The Grandmaster Flash and the Furious Five song, "The Message" contains the lyrics, "Rats in the front room, roaches in the back".
- The song "Roaches" (parody of "Rumors" by Timex Social Club) by Bobby Jimmy and the Critters.
- The Shuffle Demons did a song in 1986, "Get Out Of My House, Roach", on the album Streetniks.
- The song "Cockroaches" by Canadian progressive metal band Voivod is featured on their 1987 album Killing Technology as a cassette and CD edition bonus track.
- The song "Common People" by the English alternative rock band Pulp contains lyrics about watching "roaches climb the walls".
- The album Infest from the band Papa Roach features an American cockroach on the cover.
- Sleepytime Gorilla Museum's second studio album, Of Natural History features the song "Cockroach", which describes cockroaches with disgust.
- In 2007, American group Ween released their 11th studio album entitled La Cucaracha.
- International pop superstar Madonna has famously quoted, "I am a survivor. I am like a cockroach, you just can't get rid of me."
- The song "Doin' the Cockroach" by the band Modest Mouse is featured on the studio album The Lonesome Crowded West and the live album Baron von Bullshit Rides Again.
- The song Yonkers by the rapper Tyler, the Creator shows a cockroach's head being eaten.
- The song "Cockroach King" by the English progressive metal band Haken, featured on their album The Mountain.
- The song "Cockroaches" by Necro on his 2000 album I Need Drugs.
- The instrumental progressive metal band Blotted Science has a track on their second full-length album titled "Ingesting Blattaria"
- The deathgrind band Cattle Decapitation bases the concept of their new album "Terrasite" around humanity mutating as cockroach-human hybrids to ravage a post-apocalyptic Earth after the events of the previous album
- The song Connie Cockroach, from the first album of the Lottie Dottie Chicken series of albums. The song is a variant of a children's song in Brazil where a cockroach lies about the stuff they have. Here, in this version. Connie is the singer of a band called The Mothballs.

== Use as nickname ==
- Boxing coach Freddie Roach was nicknamed "La Cucaracha" ("The Cockroach") when he was still competing as a fighter.
- Former England cricket captain-turned-media cricket analyst and commentator Michael Atherton was nicknamed as 'The Cockroach' by the former Australian cricket captain Steve Waugh because he was extremely difficult to stamp out.
- On the television series The Cosby Show the Huxtables' son Theo has a best friend nicknamed "Cockroach".
- NFL player Kyler Murray is nicknamed "Cockroach" due to how he runs on the field, as coined by Future (rapper).
- "Cockroach" is the colloquial term for a resident of New South Wales and their Rugby League team in the State of Origin.
- During the 2019–20 Hong Kong protests, members of the Hong Kong Police Force have called the protestors "cockroach-like rioters", describing the protestors as non-human, an act that activists and protestors consider to be hate speech.
- In South Korea, during the wake of the Korean Wave, the term "international cockroach" (sometimes shortened to "I-roach") used pejoratively by the internet community referring to overzealous international fans.
