= The Metamorphosis in popular culture =

The Metamorphosis (German: Die Verwandlung) is a novella by Franz Kafka published in 1915. One of Kafka's best-known works, The Metamorphosis tells the story of salesman Gregor Samsa, who wakes one morning to find himself inexplicably transformed into a huge insect and struggles to adjust to his new condition. The novella has been recreated, referenced, or parodied in various popular culture media.

== Film ==
There are numerous film versions of the story, including:

- A 1962 Venezuelan film by Ángel Hurtado.
- A 1975 television film by Jan Němec.
- A 1977 animated short film by Caroline Leaf.
- A 1989 television film of a stage adaptation by Jim Goddard, starring Tim Roth as Gregor.
- A 1993 short film by Carlos Atanes.
- A 2002 feature film by Valery Fokin.
- A 2004 Spanish-language short film by Fran Estévez.
- A 2012 feature film by Chris Swanton.
- A 2017 Sinhala feature film by Dharmasena Pathiraja.

Varying references across other films include:

- Peter Capaldi's 1993 short film Franz Kafka's It's a Wonderful Life tells the story of the author trying to write the opening line of The Metamorphosis and experimenting with various things that Gregor might turn into, such as a banana or a kangaroo. Also notable for its Kafkaesque moments, it won the Academy Award for Live Action Short Film.
- In Spaceballs (1987), when Colonel Sandurz announces "Prepare for Metamorphosis!" (in reference to the spaceship "Spaceball 1" transforming into the giant robot "Mega-Maid"), Dark Helmet responds with "Ready, Kafka?"
- The Producers (1967), along with its stage musical adaptation (2001) and subsequent film musical (2005), features a scene in which protagonists Max and Leo search for the worst possible play they can mount in order to commit investment fraud. Max reads the first sentence of The Metamorphosis aloud, and promptly declares that it is too good.
- Kuthiraivaal (2022) takes some inspirations of The Metamorphosis with the protagonist waking up with a horse tail as opposed to becoming a cockroach.

== Print ==
- Jacob M. Appel's Scouting for the Reaper (2014) contains a telling of the novella in which a rabbi attempts to arrange a "proper Jewish burial" for Gregor.
- Lance Olsen's book, Anxious Pleasures: A Novel After Kafka, retells Kafka's novella from the points of view of those inside his family and out.
- American cartoonist Robert Crumb drew a comic adaptation of the novella, which is included in the 1993 book Introducing Kafka, an illustrated biography of Kafka also published as Kafka for Beginners, R. Crumb's Kafka, or simply Kafka.
- Marc Estrin's debut surrealist novel, Insect Dreams: The Half Life of Gregor Samsa (2002), "resurrects Kafka's half-cockroach Gregor character" vis-à-vis the world between 1915 and 1945.
- American comic artist Peter Kuper illustrated a graphic novel adaptation, first published by the Crown Publishing Group in 2003, and then again in 2004. The graphic novel has been translated into Portuguese, Italian, Turkish, and Hebrew
- East Press published a manga version of the story in 2008 as part of their Manga de Dokuha line.
- The Meowmorphosis was released in 2011 by Quirk Books as part of the Quirk Classics series; a 'mash-up' retelling by Coleridge Cook, where Samsa wakes as an adorable kitten, instead of a hideous insect.
- On 11 June 1916, the year after The Metamorphosis was published, a short story by Karl Brand titled "The Retransformation of Gregor Samsa" was published in a German-language Prague newspaper called the Prager Tagblatt. Only four pages long in translation, it is described by Karolina Watroba as follows: "It begins in the rubbish heap where the insect had been disposed of by the charwoman; it now comes back to life and metamorphoses back into a man".
- The short story "Samsa in Love", by Haruki Murakami, was published in The New Yorker of October 21, 2013, and in his 2017 book Men Without Women. Its opening sentence is, "He woke to discover that he had undergone a metamorphosis and become Gregor Samsa". The story is primarily about his encounter with a female hunchbacked locksmith apprentice.
- In the James Morrow novel Only Begotten Daughter, a character wonders what sort of children's novel Kafka might have written: "Gregor Samsa was having a really yucky morning...."
- The 1992 children's novel Shoebag by Marijane Meaker (writing as Mary James) depicts the experiences of a young cockroach transformed into a human boy and struggling to cope with human life. The story also features an appearance by a young man named Gregor Samsa who gives the protagonist tips on how to navigate school and social situations, as well as a process by which he may turn himself back into a cockroach and resume his old life.
- 2007's Kockroach, by William Lashner under the name "Tyler Knox", inverts the premise by transforming a cockroach into a human; Lashner has stated that The Metamorphosis is "the obvious starting point for" Kockroach, and that his choice of pseudonym was made in honor of Josef K. (of Kafka's The Trial).
- In 2019, Ian McEwan published The Cockroach, which his website describes as "a novella in which the main character, Jim Sams, undergoes a metamorphosis from an average nobody to the most powerful man in Britain when he wakes up to find himself the Prime Minister".
- During the events of Marvel Comics' Deadpool Killustrated, the titular assassin pays a visit to Samsa's apartment and fatally shoots him, his beetle-like corpse being found by Sherlock Holmes.
- "A. Igoni Barrett's Blackass (2015) ... opens with the Nigerian protagonist's discovery upon waking up one morning that he had turned white — except for one body part, irreverently indicated in the novel's title".
- "Mohammed Said Hjiouij's Kafka in Tangier (2019), recently translated from Arabic into English, ... begins thus: 'He read Kafka's Metamorphosis before bed. When he woke up the next morning after a night of unsettling dreams, he found himself transformed in his bed into a monster. No, not a large insect like Gregor Samsa. More like a putrid and distorted version of himself'".
- In 2010, Yoko Tawada adapted The Metamorphosis "as a Japanese play, Kafka Kaikoku".

== Stage, opera, and ballet ==
- Steven Berkoff performed a stage adaptation in 1969. Berkoff's text was also used for the libretto to Brian Howard's 1983 opera Metamorphosis. In 1989 Berkoff directed a Broadway production of a play, adapted by Berkoff, starring Mikhail Baryshnikov and René Auberjonois, which opened at the Ethel Barrymore Theatre.
- Another stage adaptation was performed in 2006 as a co-production between the Icelandic company Vesturport and the Lyric Hammersmith, adapted and directed by Gísli Örn Garðarsson and David Farr, with a music soundtrack performed by Nick Cave and Warren Ellis. It was also performed at the Sydney Theatre Company as part of a world tour in 2009 and returned to the Lyric Hammersmith in January 2013, starring Garðarsson as Gregor Samsa.
- A ballet adaptation premiered at the Royal Opera House's Linbury Studio Theatre in 2011.

== Music ==
- In 1975, the Rolling Stones released a compilation album titled Metamorphosis. The album cover alludes to the book, with each band member's head being replaced with a bug's.
- In 1988, Philip Glass composed Solo Piano, with five of its seven movements called "Metamorphosis", referring to Kafka's novella.

== Radio ==
- A 1982 radio drama produced by The Mind's Eye theater company. It is adapted by, directed by, and stars Erik Bauersfeld.
- A radio drama, combining Metamorphosis with Dr. Seuss performed by David Rakoff and Jonathan Goldstein and produced by Jonathan Goldstein and Mira Burt-Wintonick with Cristal Duhaime, was broadcast in 2008, on CBC Radio One's program Wiretap in 2008. In 2012, it was broadcast on episode 470 of This American Life.
- In 2006, BBC Radio 4 adapted the novella for radio with the story being read by actor Benedict Cumberbatch.
- First broadcast on 24 June 2017 on BBC Radio 4, writer Alan Harris gave the story a modern twist with a darkly comic edge as Kafka's Metamorphosis, directed by James Robinson, with Tom Basden as Gregor, Kenneth Collard as The Father, Felicity Montagu as The Mother and narrated by Peter Marinker.

== Video games ==
- Polish game studio Ovid Works released a video game adaptation called Metamorphosis in 2020. In the first-person puzzle platformer, the player controls Gregor Samsa as he tries to regain his humanity.

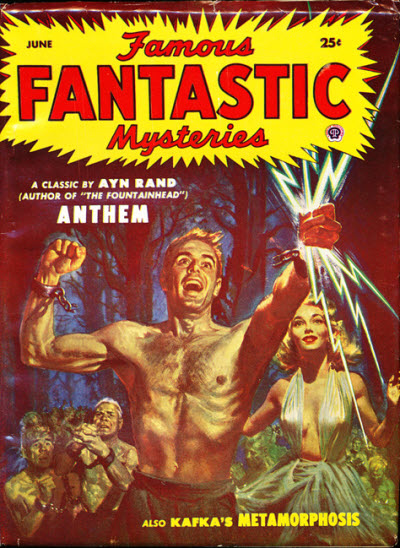
The Metamorphosis was reprinted in the June 1953 issue of the pulp magazine Famous Fantastic Mysteries.

- Filia, a character from the fighting game Skullgirls, has a bond with a parasitic, shapeshifting creature called Samson. One of her special moves is called "Gregor Samson", in reference to the character Gregor Samsa, and during this attack, Samson has a chance to call out "Metamorphosis!".
- The 2015 survival-horror game Resident Evil: Revelations 2 features references to many of Kafka's works. Episode titles of the game come from different works of Kafka's, with Episode Four being titled "Metamorphosis". The game also features loading screens with various different quotes by Kafka, including from The Metamorphosis. Alex Wesker, one of the primary characters, is specifically fascinated by Kafka's works, comparing herself to both Kafka himself and Gregor Samsa.
- On at least two occasions Nintendo of America has used excerpts from The Metamorphosis and Lorem ipsum as placeholder text during renovation periods of their games' official websites; for Animal Crossing in 2018 in anticipation of Animal Crossing: New Horizons (2020); and Kirby in 2021 in anticipation of Kirby and the Forgotten Land (2022).
- In the 2023 game Honkai: Star Rail, players can play as a character named "Kafka". Her design implements many aspects of spiders, referencing the novella, and the violin she plays during the Star Rail LIVE concert references Gregor's sister, Grete Samsa. Additionally, one of Kafka's idle animations is her pretending to play a violin, which she also does in the intro of the game. Even her name is a direct reference to Franz Kafka himself.
- In the 2023 game Limbus Company developed by South Korean studio Project Moon, a playable character named Gregor is a direct reference to Gregor Samsa. Gregor's base Identity has his right arm replaced with a giant cockroach claw, and his base E.G.O. of "Suddenly, One Day" is a reference to the opening of The Metamorphosis.
- The game Bad Mojo is loosely based on The Metamorphosis.

== Comics ==
- Bill Watterson’s newspaper comic strip Calvin and Hobbes references The Metamorphosis in several story arcs, including one where Hobbes references "Kafka dreams" prior to discovering a gigantic bedbug.
- Another comic strip, Bill Amend's FoxTrot, also does a unique spin on the story. Jason Fox, a science fiction buff, actually wants to be transformed into a hideous creature, and does get his wish. However, he is horrified to discover that he had been transformed into a smaller duplicate of his sister Paige. "Let's get you a training bra!" she says enthusiastically.
- Artist R. Sikoryak's series Masterpiece Comics features a mashup of The Metamorphosis and the comics strip Peanuts called "Good Old Gregor Brown", in which Charlie Brown takes on the role of Gregor Samsa.
- Jhonen Vasquez's indie comic Johnny the Homicidal Maniac has at least one instance of an immortal cockroach named "Mr. Samsa".
- The 2016 hentai manga Metamorphosis (also known as Emergence), is loosely based on The Metamorphosis. The main character, Saki Yoshida, is an asocial middle school graduate who decides to get a makeover to get friends, only to have her life go through a downward spiral as she is used, abused, and abandoned by everyone she knows.
- In the manga series Kaiju No. 8, the main character is named Kafka Hibino, a man who has the ability to transform into a monster.
- Tokyo Ghoul is a Japanese manga series by Sui Ishida that draws significant inspiration from The Metamorphosis. The story follows Ken Kaneki, a young man who transforms into a half-ghoul after a life-threatening encounter, forcing him to navigate the challenges of living between the human and ghoul worlds. The themes of alienation, identity, and transformation in Tokyo Ghoul parallel those found in Kafka's novella. In the start of Tokyo Ghoul's second chapter, Ishida directly references The Metamorphosis when Kaneki reflects, "In one of Franz Kafka's most famous stories, a young man turns into a giant insect. I read it when I was in the 5th grade. At the time I imagined what it would be like if I turned into a giant insect". This acknowledgment highlights the influence of Kafka's work on the manga's exploration of the protagonist's psychological and existential dilemmas.
- The Metamorphosis was included as part of a manga adapting several of Kafka's stories called KAFKA: A manga adaptation, written by the sibling duo Nishioka Kyōdai. It was published in Japanese from 2008 to 2010 and translated to English in 2023.

== Television ==
- The 2nd OVA of Bludgeoning Angel Dokuro-chan in 2007 makes recurring reference to Gregor Samsa and illustrates him.
- A 2001 episode of Home Movies, entitled "Director's Cut", includes "The Franz Kafka Rock Opera", a musical version of The Metamorphosis.
- In a 2003 episode of Arthur ("Bugged"), Alan "The Brain" Powers has a dream in which he wakes up as a giant "bug", a metaphor for his anxiety about being annoying.
- 1992 episode of Northern Exposure "Cicely" Season 3, Episode 23 Franz Kafka, who has the appearance of Joel, arrives at the founding of Cicely, the "Paris of the North" circa 1909, to meet with Roslyn and hopefully cure his writer's block and migraines. With the help of Mary (Maggie), he is able to establish the premise for Metamorphosis.
- 1998 : In the French cartoon Oggy and the Cockroaches, in the episode "Metamorphosis" (season 1, episode 4b), after main character Oggy consumes a piece of glowing chocolate, he transforms into a cockroach himself.
- 2001: The Smallville episode "Metamorphosis" involves Greg Arkin (a student at Smallville High) gaining insect-like powers after being attacked by kryptonite-empowered insects, which Chloe Sullivan describes as "gone Kafka."
- 2004: In the Japanese tokusatsu series Tokusou Sentai Dekaranger, the home planet of Alienizer criminal Sheik and his ex-girlfriend Myra, is named Zamuza, referring the character of Gregor Samsa.
- 2022: The Riverdale episode "Ex-Libris" (Season 6, Episode 13), features a plot point in which character Jughead Jones is implied to be slowly turning into a cockroach after Percival Pickens uses Jughead's copy of "The Metamorphosis" for a spell.

== Satire ==
- On May 22, 1981, Joey Skaggs staged a satirical performance in which he converted an apartment into a mock laboratory filled with cockroach-themed art and memorabilia. Presenting himself as entomologist Josef Gregor, Skaggs held a press conference where he claimed to have developed a strain of cockroaches immune to toxins and radiation. He also asserted that he had extracted a hormone from the roaches that could cure common ailments and provide immunity to nuclear radiation. The event was attended by journalists, including representatives from United Press International (UPI), and received widespread media coverage, including a UPI story that ran in numerous newspapers across the United States. Skaggs later appeared live on WNBC-TV’s Live at Five and shared additional details about the supposed discovery. The hoax drew on references to The Metamorphosis, including the protagonist Gregor Samsa, which went unnoticed by reporters at the time. Months later, in an interview with People Magazine (September 21, 1981), Skaggs revealed the hoax, highlighting his intent to critique media gullibility and encourage critical thinking about quick-fix solutions. The revelation prompted further media coverage, including a front-page article in The Wall Street Journal.
