= Book censorship by country =

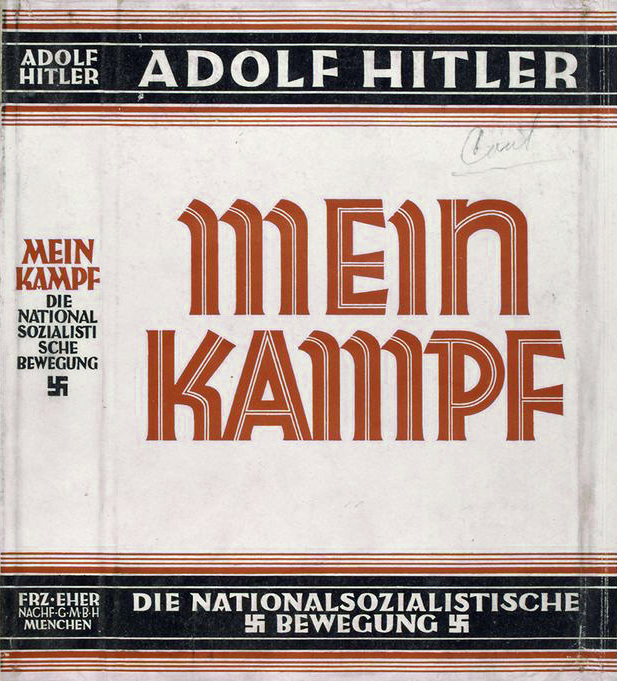
Adolf Hitler's Mein Kampf has been banned by several European governments.

This is an index of book censorship by country, which contain countries with books that have been banned, prohibited or censored by government or religious authority. The list is sorted alphabetically by country name.

== Book censorship ==
- Book censorship in Canada
- Book censorship in China
- Book censorship in Hong Kong
- Book censorship in India
- Book censorship in Iran
- Book censorship in the Republic of Ireland
- Book censorship in the United Kingdom
- Book censorship in the United States

== Specific topics ==
- List of books banned in India
- List of books banned in New Zealand
- LGBTQ book censorship in Russia
- Russian book ban in Ukraine
- Book banning in the United States (2021–present)
- List of most commonly challenged books in the United States
- Proposed bans of LGBT-themed books in the United States

== See also ==
- Book burning
  - List of book-burning incidents
- Index Librorum Prohibitorum
  - List of authors and works on the Index Librorum Prohibitorum
- List of authors banned in Nazi Germany
