= Kockroach (film) =

- Directed by: Matt Ross
- Screenplay by: Jonathan Ames
- Based on: Kockroach by William Lashner
- Produced by: Andrew Lazar; Christina Weiss Lurie
- Starring: Chris Hemsworth; Taron Egerton; Zazie Beetz; Rachel Sennott; Brian Geraghty; Alec Baldwin
- Cinematography: Adam Arkapaw
- Production companies: Mad Chance Productions; Black Bear Pictures
- Country: United States
- Language: English

Kockroach is an upcoming American crime thriller film directed by Matt Ross, based on the 2007 novel by William Lashner.

== Premise ==
A mysterious stranger from New York's criminal underworld transforms himself into a larger-than-life crime boss in a city where power is everything.

== Cast ==
- Chris Hemsworth
- Zazie Beetz
- Taron Egerton
- Alec Baldwin
- Rachel Sennott
- Brian Geraghty

== Production ==
It was announced in August 2025 that Matt Ross was set to direct the film, with Channing Tatum, Oscar Isaac, and Zazie Beetz cast to star. In October 2025, Taron Egerton joined the cast, replacing Isaac due to scheduling conflicts.

In February 2026, Chris Hemsworth joined the cast, replacing Tatum who also dropped out due to scheduling conflicts, with principal photography scheduled to begin in April 2026. In March, Alec Baldwin joined the cast. In April, Rachel Sennott joined the cast. Principal photography began on April 13, 2026, in Sydney, Australia. In May 2026, Brian Geraghty joined the cast. Filming wrapped on May 31.
