= Zharaskan Abdirash =

Zharaskan Abdirash (Kazakh: Жарасқан Әбдіраш, Jarasqan Äbdıraş; Russian: Жараскан Абдрашев) was a Soviet-era Kazakh poet. His work was banned during the Soviet period. His son, director Rustem Abdrashitov, made a film about his father's life in 2004, entitled Rebirth Island (Kazakh: Каладан келген кыз; Russian: Остров Возрождения).

== Published works ==
- Koktem tynysy: zhas aqyndar zhinaghy. Almaty: "Zhazushy" baspasy, 1975.
- Dala, sening ulyngmyn. Almaty: "Zhazushy" baspasy, 1975.
- Sana soqpaghy. Almaty: "Zhalyn", 1998.
- Kongil kokpary: tangdamaly. Almaty: "Zhalyn", 1998.
