= Rosenberg v. Board of Education =

New York Supreme Court case

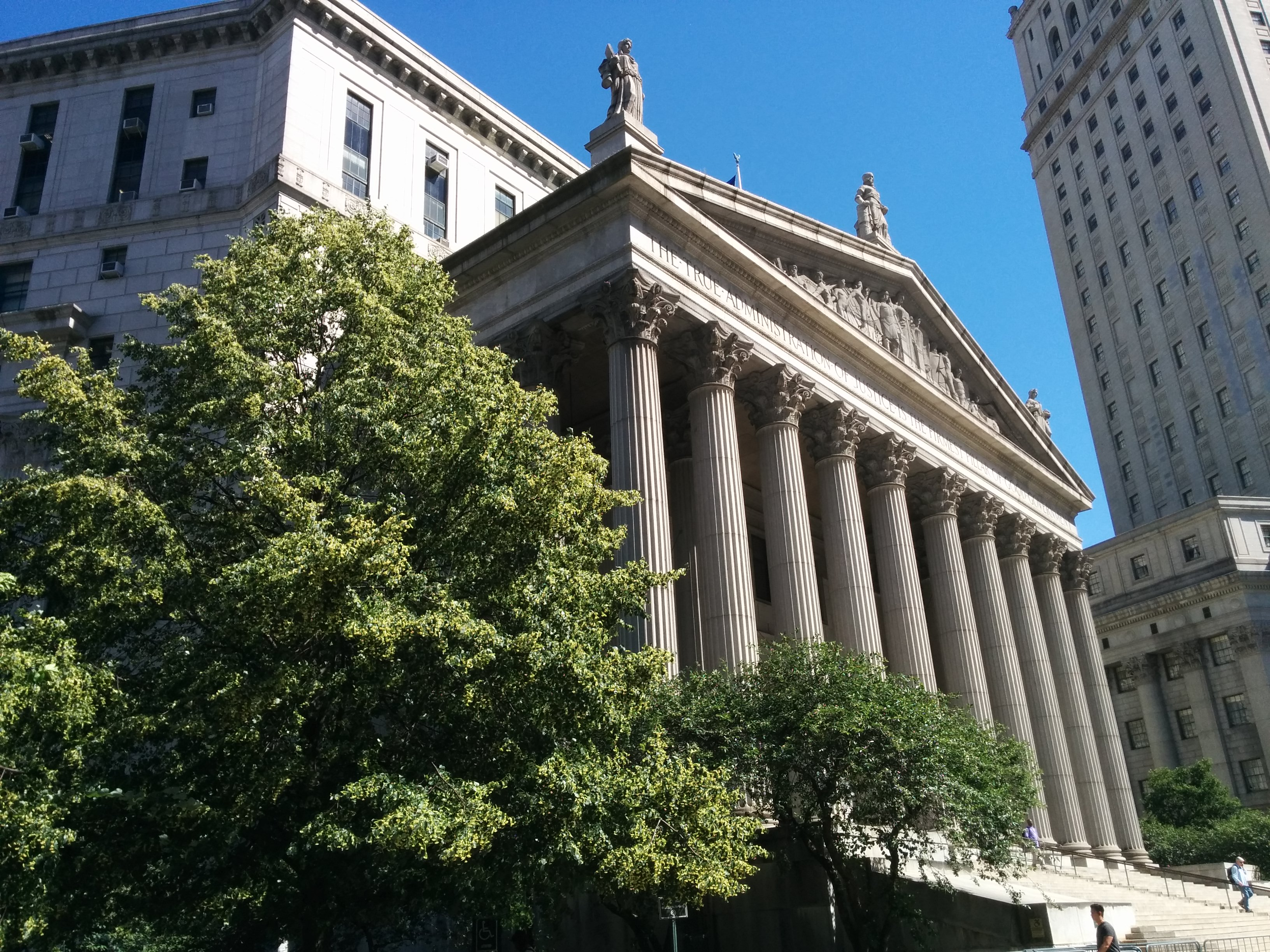
New York Supreme Court

Murray B. Rosenberg et al., vs. Board of Education of the City of New York et al. 92 N.Y.S.2d 344 (Sup. Ct. 1949) was a decision by the New York Supreme Court, Special Term, Kings County, concerning the authority of the New York City Board of Education to remove specific literary works from approved lists for use in public schools based on concerns about potentially harmful or prejudiced content. The case specifically involved the removal of Charles Dickens' Oliver Twist and William Shakespeare's The Merchant of Venice due to objections that the portrayals of the characters Fagin and Shylock, respectively, promoted antisemitism.

== Background ==
In 1949, Murray B. Rosenberg, a parent with a child enrolled in a public school, along with other petitioners, sought to ban Charles Dickens' novel "Oliver Twist" and William Shakespeare's play "The Merchant of Venice" from New York City public schools, arguing that these works were "anti-Semitic and anti-religious." The lawsuit initiated an Article 78 proceeding of the Civil Practice Act under New York law. This legal mechanism allows challenges to actions taken by administrative bodies. In this case, the petitioners sought a court order compelling the Board of Education to reverse its decision that permitted these works to remain as approved reading and study materials in secondary schools. The inclusion of these books in the New York City Secondary Schools' approved reading and study material list was specifically challenged based upon their portrayal of Jewish characters.

The petitioners, represented by attorney Joseph Goldstein, argued that the books were harmful to students. Specifically regarding Dickens' "Oliver Twist," they claimed it was "calculated to, and does, inculcate bitter hatred and malice in the hearts and minds of many students and pupils attending our public schools and secondary schools against American citizens of Jewish faith."

Fagin in Oliver Twist is described as exploiting "the most insidious of anti-Semitic stereotypes." Dickens emphasized Fagin's red hair, while George Cruikshank's illustrations that accompanied the novel added traditional antisemitic markers like "the long gaberdine, broad-brimmed hat, and bottle nose." Both Bill Sikes and Nancy, Fagin's associates, refer to him as "the devil," and Fagin is portrayed with seemingly supernatural evil qualities. Most significantly, throughout the novel, the narrator consistently refers to Fagin as "the Jew," which was particularly problematic as it reduced him to his ethnic identity.

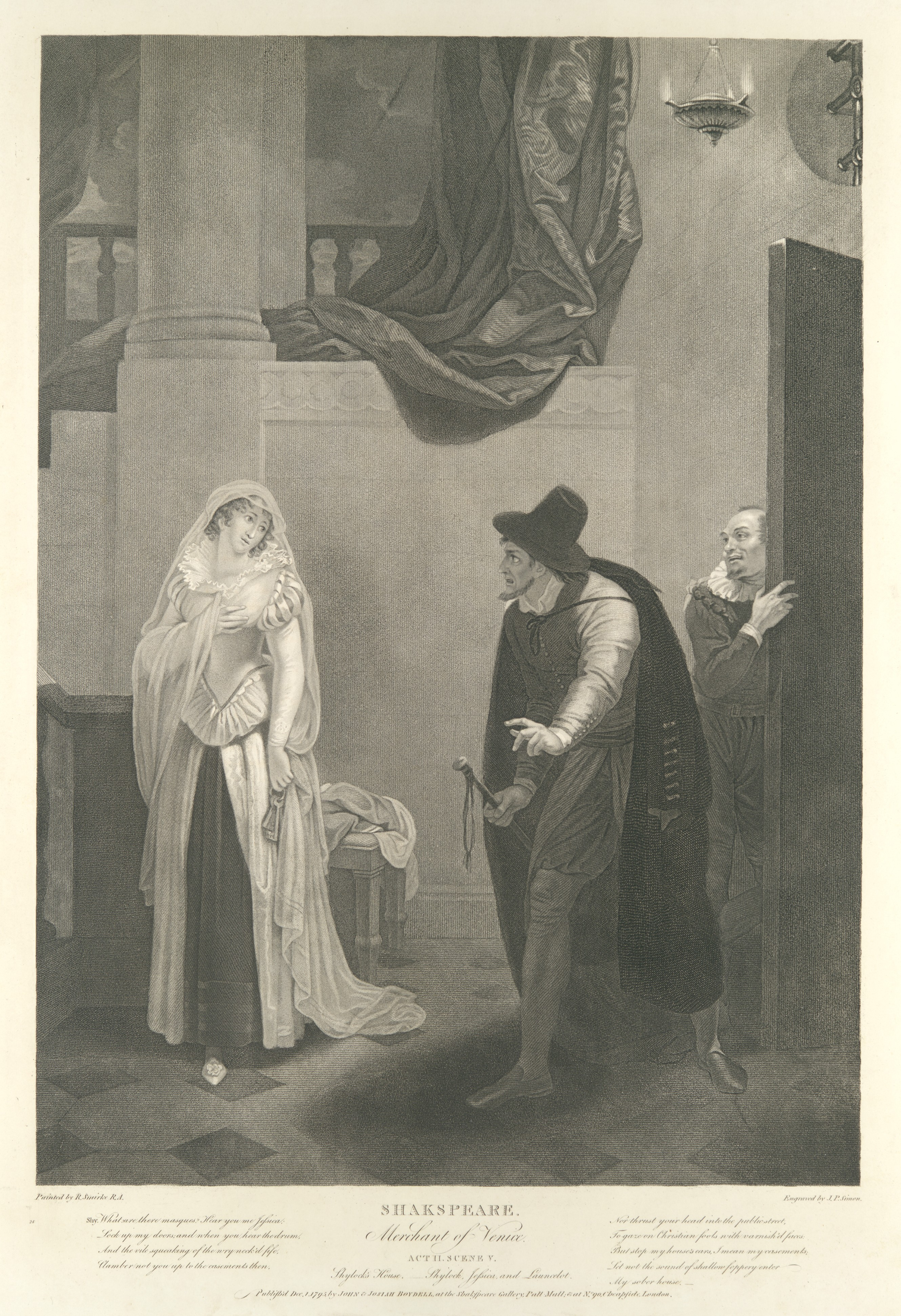
Shylock in "The Merchant of Venice"

Shylock from Shakespeare's "The Merchant of Venice" is described as "the archetypical Jew in English literature" and "the cultural anchor for English anti-Semitic sentiment." According to a literary critique, Shakespeare connected persistent antisemitic myths about Jews murdering, circumcising, cannibalizing, and drinking the blood of Christians to Shylock's threat to cut a pound of flesh from Antonio's bosom. This portrayal also reinforced prejudice against Jews based on their freedom from medieval church ordinances against usury (moneylending with interest).

In defense, Dr. William Jansen, Superintendent of Schools, submitted an affidavit stating that teachers in New York City schools were taking special care to explain to their students that the anti-Jewish characters in these works were not "typical" of Jewish people. The Board of Education, represented by John P. McGrath, Corporation Counsel, defended its right to include these works in the curriculum, arguing that the literary value of the books outweighed concerns about their potentially negative portrayals.

The American Civil Liberties Union, represented by B. Lawrence Siegel, participated in the case as amicus curiae, supporting the Board of Education's position that banning the books would infringe upon academic freedom.

== Decision ==
The petition was dismissed by Justice Anthony J. Di Giovanna in the New York Supreme Court, Special Term, Kings County, who wrote, "Except where a book has been maliciously written for the apparent purpose of promoting and fomenting a bigoted and intolerant hatred against a particular racial or religious group, public interest in a free and democratic society does not warrant or encourage the suppression of any book at the whim of any unduly sensitive person or group of persons, merely because a character described in such book as belonging to a particular race or religion is portrayed in a derogatory or offensive manner."

The court ruled that the two works could not be banned from New York City public schools because there was no substantial reason to do so, making clear that readers must look past the religious and cultural backgrounds of characters in fictional literature to find its true literary value.

The ruling affirmed that "educational institutions are concerned with the development of free inquiry and learning," and administrative officers "must be free to guide teachers and pupils toward that goal." It recognized that the discretion of educational authorities should not be interfered with in the absence of proof of actual malevolent intent.

== Significance ==
Rosenberg was a landmark legal case concerning literary censorship in public education that established precedent for cases concerning academic freedom and the treatment of controversial literary works in schools. The case established a precedent for many other court cases regarding how the court and schools should approach controversial literary works. The court emphasized that "public education and instruction in the home will remove religious and racial intolerance more effectively than censorship and suppression of literary works which have been accepted as works of art and which are not per se propaganda against or for any race, religion or group."

Rosenberg has become a reference in subsequent cases involving attempts to ban books from school libraries and curricula. It set a high bar for those seeking to remove literary works from educational settings, establishing that the portrayal of negative stereotypes alone is insufficient grounds for censorship if the work has recognized literary value and was not written with malicious intent.

The case remains relevant in contemporary discussions about book bans and educational censorship. The court's approach to balancing sensitivity to minority groups with literary and educational value continues to inform modern legal reasoning on similar cases. For instance, Todd v. Rochester Community Schools, 200 N.W.2d 90 (Mich. Ct. App. 1972) cited Rosenberg's precedent, with the Court claiming that if book censorship based on religious content were allowed, "public school students could no longer marvel at Sir Galahad's saintly quest for the Holy Grail, nor be introduced to the dangers of Hitler's Mein Kampf nor read the mellifluous poetry of John Milton and John Donne... Shakespeare would have to delete Shylock from The Merchant of Venice."
