= Maha Hassan =

Syrian-Kurdish journalist and novelist

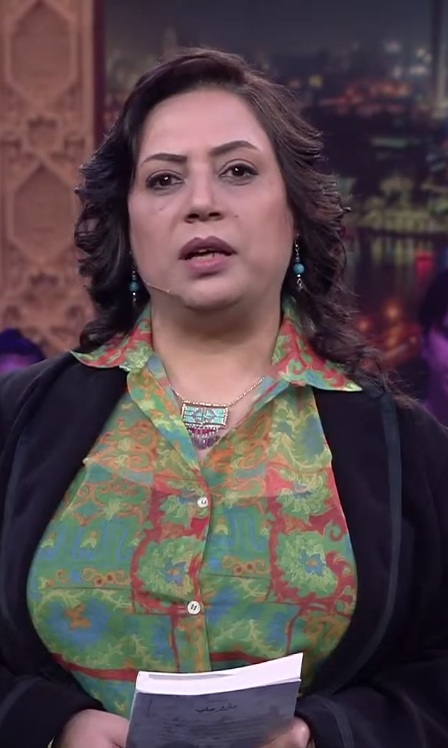
Maha Hassan, The Munathara Initiative, March 2017.

Maha Hassan (Arabic: مها حسن; born in Aleppo, Syria) is a Syrian-Kurdish journalist and novelist. A native Kurdish speaker, she writes in Arabic. In 2000, she was banned from publishing in Syria for her "morally condemnable" writing, and since August 2004, she has been living in exile in Paris.

== Life and career ==
After graduating from secondary school, Hassan acquired a Bachelor of Laws from the University of Aleppo. In some of her works, she has fictionally treated taboos of Arab societies, such as abortions and honour killings, as in her novel Daughters of the Wilderness. In 2022, her novel Femmes d'Alep - De chair et de sang (Women of Aleppo - Of Flesh and Blood) was published in French.

For the Syrian independent media platform SyriaUntold, she has published articles about works by Kurdish writers in their native language as well as about her life in France and her writing in French.

== Critical reception ==
In 2005, Hassan was awarded a Hellman/Hammett grant for persecuted writers by Human Rights Watch. In 2007–2008, Hassan lived for a year at the invitation of Amsterdam City of Refugees in the renovated apartment of Anne Frank and her family at the Amsterdam Merwedeplein.

Hassan's novels Habl suri (Umbilical Cord, 2011) and al-Rawiyat (The Novels, 2014) were longlisted for the International Prize for Arabic Fiction. In 2021, her novel The Neighbourhood of Wonder was shortlisted for the Naguib Mahfouz Medal for Literature.

In June 2021, literary translator Sawad Hussain, writing for the British Council, recommended Hassan's non-fiction work In Anne Frank’s House for future translation. After Hassan's residency in Anne Frank’s house, it contains letters to Anne Frank, written by Hassan while travelling in Tunisia, Egypt and Palestine. Expressing "loss and anguish", the work challenges common stereotypes about Jews held by Syrians and also "drawing connections between [Hassan's] lived experience as a Kurd and that of Anne Frank’s as a Jew."

A 2022 literary study investigated the "concept of home" in Hassan's Drums of Love and Ghassan Jubbaʿi's Qahwat Al-General as examples of contemporary Syrian literature following the beginning of the Syrian revolution. The study posited "that in both works a real sense of home proves unattainable" and "that the unattainable sense of home depicted in the novels marks such texts as a part of the enduring legacy of the Syrian revolution and its causes."

Her 2024 novel Maqam Kurd deals with Kurdish maqam music, including references to Kurdish songs. Further, the story tells of several Kurdish female protagonists in Aleppo and Paris, representing multi-layered and somewhat disparate Kurdish personalities. In his review for ArabLit magazine, Moroccan writer Mohammed Said Hjiouij interpreted the novel as a "celebration of the Kurdish identity and as an apology for being forced to abandon it".

== Selected works ==
Original titles published in Arabic:

- The Infinite: Biography of the Other
- The Picture on the Cover
- Hymns of Nothingness
- The Tunnel of Existence
- Daughters of the Wilderness
- Habl suri (Umbilical Cord), 2011
- al-Rawiyat (The Novels), 2014
- Metro Halab (Aleppo Subway), 2017
- Amat sabahan ayatuha al-harb (Good Morning, War!), 2017
- The Neighbourhood of Wonder
- Maqam Kurd, 2024

== Literature ==
- Natour, Manal Al (2022-01-02). "Home, identity, and place in Syrian literature: Maha Hassan's Drums of Love and Ghassan Jubbaʿi's Qahwat Al-General". Contemporary Levant. 7 (1): 66–80. doi:10.1080/20581831.2022.2058717. ISSN 2058-1831.

== See also ==
- Syrian literature - Syrian women writers
