= Book censorship =

Book removed or banned from public and/or private usage

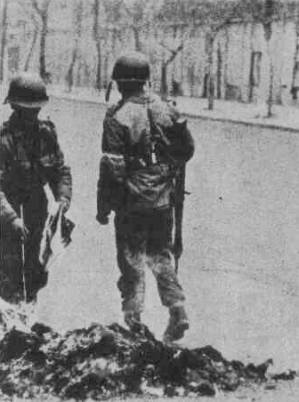
Chilean soldiers burn books considered politically subversive in 1973, under Augusto Pinochet's dictatorship.

Book censorship or book banning is the act of some authority (countries, government) taking measures to suppress ideas and information within a book. Censorship is "the regulation of free speech and other forms of entrenched authority". Censors typically identify as either a concerned parent, community members who react to a text without reading, or local or national organizations. Books have been censored by authoritarian dictatorships to silence dissent, such as the People's Republic of China, Nazi Germany and the Soviet Union. Books are most often censored for age appropriateness, offensive language, sexual content, amongst other reasons. Similarly, religions may issue lists of banned books, such as the historical example of the Catholic Church's Index Librorum Prohibitorum and bans of such books as Salman Rushdie's The Satanic Verses by Ayatollah Khomeini, which do not always carry legal force. Censorship can be enacted at the national or subnational level as well, and can carry legal penalties. In many cases, the authors of these books could face harsh sentences, exile from the country, or even execution.

== Background ==
Almost every country places some restrictions on what may be published, although the emphasis and the degree of control differ from country to country and at different periods." There are a variety of reasons why books may be censored. Materials are often suppressed due to the perceived notion of obscenity. This obscenity can apply to materials that are about sexuality, race, drugs, or social standing. The censorship of literature on the charge of obscenity appears to have begun in the mid-19th century. The rise of the middle class, who had evangelical backgrounds, brought about this concern with obscenity. Book censorship has been happening in society for as long as they have been printed, and even before with manuscripts and codices. The use of book censorship has been a common practice throughout our history.

Governments have also sought to ban certain books which they perceive to contain material that could threaten, embarrass, or criticize them. A well known example of this happening was the Soviet Union banning two of George Orwell's novels, Animal Farm and 1984, for their critique of totalitarianism, with Animal Farm being an allegory for the Russian Revolution of 1917.

Throughout history, societies practiced various forms of censorship in the belief that the community, as represented by the government, was responsible for molding the individual. According to Harvard Library, books have been getting banned since at least 1637, the first time a book was recorded to be banned.

Other leaders outside the government have banned books, including religious authorities. Church leaders who prohibit members of their faith from reading the banned books may want to shelter them from perceived obscene, immoral, or profane ideas or situations or from ideas that may challenge the teaching of that religion.

Religious materials have been subject to censorship as well. For example, various scriptures have been banned (and sometimes burned at several points in history). The Bible has been censored and even banned, as have other religious scriptures. Similarly, books based on the scriptures have also been banned, such as Leo Tolstoy's The Kingdom of God Is Within You, which was banned in the Russian Empire for being anti-establishment.

The banning of a book often has the effect of enticing people to seek the book. The action of banning the book creates an interest in the book which has the opposite effect of making the work more popular.

== Methods ==
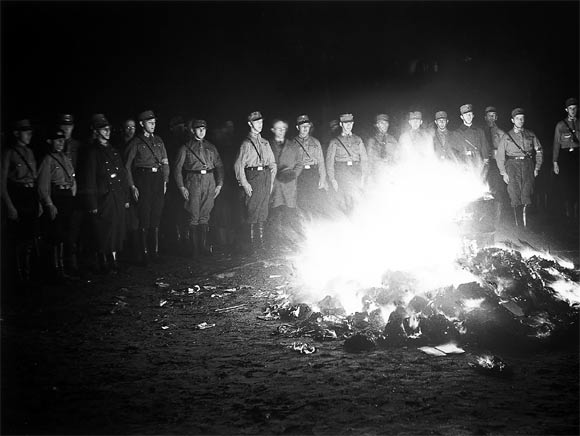
Nazi Germany burned works of Jewish authors, and other works considered "un-German".

=== Book burning ===
Book burning is the practice of destroying, often ceremonially, books or other written material. It is usually carried out in public and is generally motivated by moral, religious, or political objections to the material, with a desire to censor it. Book burning is one of the original types of censorship dating back to 213 BCE. Book burning has historically been performed in times of conflict, for example Nazi book burnings, US Library of Congress, Arian books, Jewish Manuscripts in 1244, and the burning of Christian texts, just to name a few. In the United States, book burning is another right that is protected by the first amendment as a freedom of expression.

=== School censorship ===
In the United States, school organizations that find contents of a book to be offensive or unfit for a given age group will often have the book removed from the class curriculum. This type of censorship usually arises from parental influence in schools. Parents who do not feel comfortable with a child's required reading will make efforts to have the book removed from a class, and replaced by another title.

=== Banned books ===
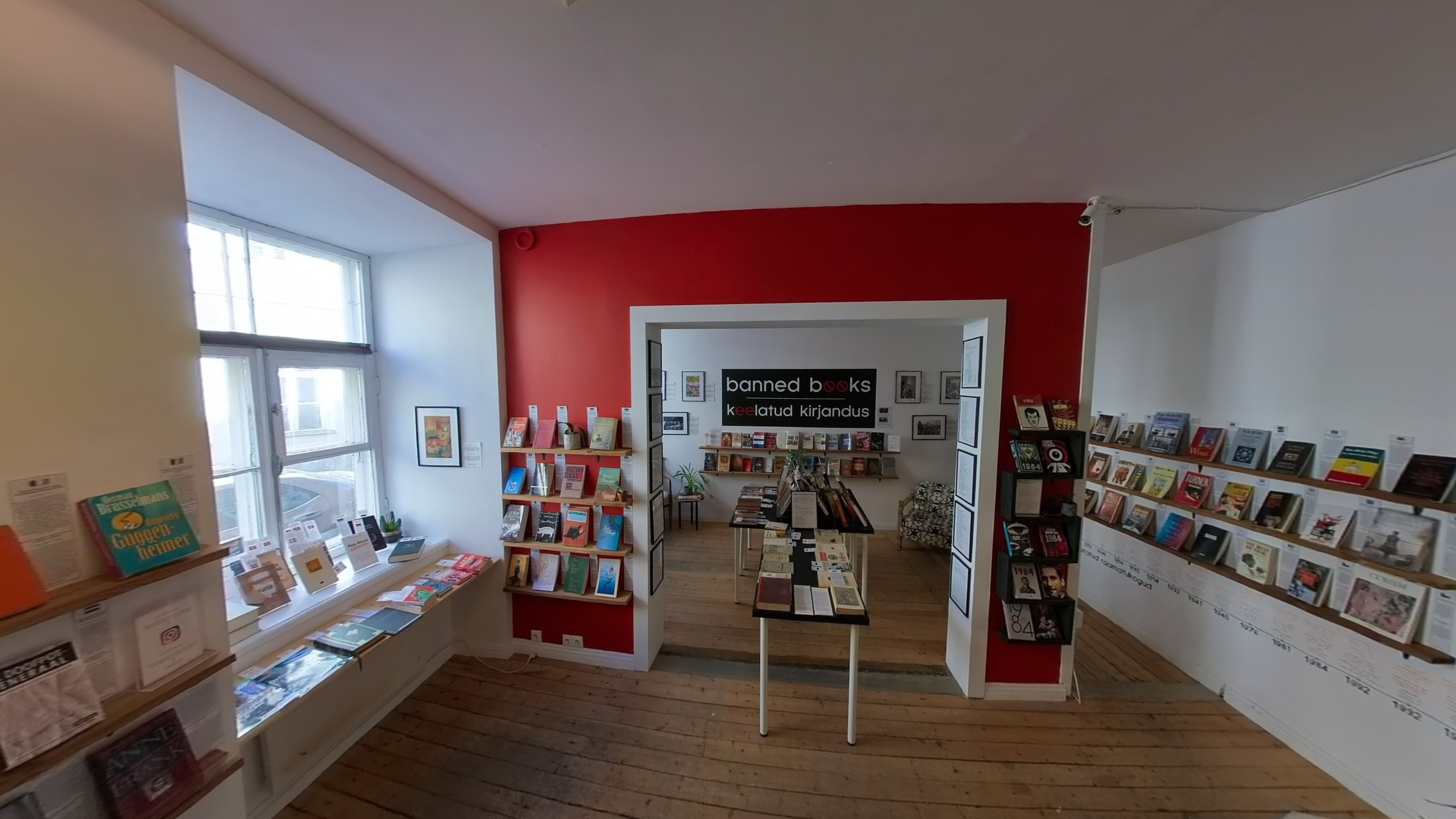
Banned Books Museum in Tallinn, Estonia

According to the Marshall University Library, a banned book in the United States is one that has been "removed from a library, classroom, etc." In many situations, parents or concerned parties will ban or propose a ban on a children's book based on the book's contents. The American Library Association publishes a list of the top "Banned and Challenged Books" for any given year. The American Library Association also organizes a "Banned Books Week", which is "an annual event celebrating the freedom to read." The goal of the project is to bring awareness to banned books and promote the freedom to learn.

In 2020, the Banned Books Museum in Tallinn, Estonia, was created to showcase a variety of books that have been banned in different locales.

In recent years, American parents are beginning to challenge the material that is being taught to their children in these schools. This type of censorship often comes from concern about the specific content that is being taught; whether that be about language, sexual content, racial themes, or certain political biases. In some cases around the U.S., the school board often looks to offer a diverse perspective, but some parents believe that books focused on the topics named above promotes ideas contrary to their values. And because of this disconnect, this has led to numerous book challenges and bans across the United States. One notable example is the removal of Stamped: Racism, Antiracism, and You— by Ibram X. This book aimed to highlight the history and impact of racism in America. However, parent Katie Gates argued that the book was "“rooted in untruths about our nation and from a twisted and biased perspective on American History” (Flanagan, 2023). Gates was not a supporter of the books tone and approach, suggesting it was inappropriate for the classroom and might present opinion as fact.

=== Shelf removal ===
Challenges or attempts to ban book titles increased in the 2020s, with most being written by or about people who are LGBTQ+, Black, Indigenous, and people of color.

Shelf removal refers to being unable to buy or borrow a book from a bookstore or library, respectively. For example, Powell's Books in Portland, Oregon refused to put conservative writer Andy Ngo's book about Antifa, titled, Unmasked: Inside Antifa’s Radical Plan to Destroy Democracy on their shelves.

==== School libraries ====
According to the American Library Association, "the school library is a unique and essential part of the learning community, and when led by a qualified school librarian, prepares all learners for college, career, and life." In certain scenarios, concerned third parties often voice their concerns over certain titles in libraries that they deem to be unfit for students. In 1982, the Island Trees Union Free School District No. 26 versus Pico was taken to the United States Supreme Court. In the case, students and parents challenged the board's removal of certain titles from the school library. The books included texts which the board considered to be "anti-American, anti-Christian, anti-Semitic, and just plain filthy." The Supreme Court Justices stated removal of books from libraries was only permissible if the books were considered educationally unsuitable.

There have also been examples of school library book collections purged by the librarians. In 2023, libraries of the Peel District School Board removed all books published prior to 2008 according to what CBC News described as an "equity-based book weeding process." In 2025, the H.B. Beal Secondary School library disposed of 10,000 books for reasons including "physical damage (such as mold), or harmful and outdated content such as racist imagery (blackface) or stereotypical depictions of Indigenous people."

==== Public libraries ====
Public libraries are considered to be open to the public within a town or community. Similar to school libraries, removal of books from public library shelves is often the subject of heavy debate. "Public schools and public libraries...have been the setting for legal battles about student access to books, removal or retention of 'offensive' material, regulation of patron behavior, and limitations on public access to the internet."

=== Privishing ===
Privishing is the practice by which a book publisher at the behest of governments or special interests acquires the rights to a manuscript and then sabotages the distribution and marketing of the book, usually breaching publishing contracts. Methods include cutting print runs so as to make books unprofitable, scaling back promotional efforts, delaying release so as to miss holiday seasons, cutting advertising budgets, and pressuring reviewers to be hostile. An example is Gerard Colby's 1984 Du Pont: Behind the Nylon Curtain – where the Du Pont family convened a "war counsel" to suppress the book and put pressure on publisher Prentice Hall to ensure its limited distribution and print run. With a limited print run of 10,000, the family then dispatched its own agents to buy up as many copies as possible.

=== University library list of offensive books ===
Beginning in October 2023, Cambridge University is compiling a list of books that some consider "offensive". An email to faculty asked for lists of books they considered to fit in the vague category "problematic". Some faculty responses included comparing it to Nazi book bans and also labelling it "Orwellian and alarming".

== Reasons ==
Book censorship can arise for any number of reasons. Concerned parties may find certain texts to be unfit for a learning environment. Some of the most common reasons for censorship include:

- Age appropriateness – One of the most common reasons for censorship is when a book's content does not align with the intended age of the audience. This reason is one of the more popular reasons because it is generally applied to any title a censor deems worthy of censorship. Topics of violence, sexual activities, and inappropriate language are the largest contributors to what determines age appropriateness. Due to this, children's novels tend to be the largest target in the field of banned books. Many parents and concerned parties will challenge titles or hold back books from children, in hopes that they will not negatively impact an impressionable child. Common examples of this include Looking for Alaska, I am Jazz, and Habibi, which all were listed on the American Library associations top 10 challenged books for 2015 for age appropriateness. However, free speech organizations and library groups note that in practice, many books that are challenged on a basis of being inappropriate or containing sexual content are books dealing with LGBT and racially diverse characters.
- LGBTQ+ content – Censorship happens when authors will include LGBTQ+ characters and themes in their novels. Drama, by Raina Telgemeier, has been one of the top 10 most challenged books for the last three years for the use of LGBTQ+ characters, according to the American Library Association. The Well of Loneliness, by Radclyffe Hall, was banned in the UK from 1928 to 1949 for the lesbian themes the book presents.
- Offensive language – Novels that contain profane or offensive language are one reason which book could be censored. Individuals who do not find the language of the book to be appropriate will seek the book to be banned or censored. Adventures of Huckleberry Finn, by Mark Twain, is a book that has been censored and considered controversial for over 100 years. It has been argued whether the book should be considered racist, or anti-racist, due to the use of the word "nigger" in the text. In 1982, a school administrator of Virginia called the novel the "most grotesque example of racism I've ever seen in my life".
- Political influence – Occurs when a book is considered by a censor to be politically motivated, or a censor has a certain political motivation for censorship. In 1958, the Irish Censorship of Publications Board banned the book Borstal Boy because of critiques of Irish republicanism, social attitudes and the Catholic Church. Areopagitica, by John Milton, was banned in the Kingdom of England for the philosophical defenses of the right to freedom of speech and expression.
- Racial issues – Novels which promote stories of racism or encouraging racism towards a group of people. Adventures of Huckleberry Finn, as well as To Kill a Mockingbird, by Harper Lee, have been censored for many years due to the use of racial slurs within the texts.
- Religious affiliation – A title can be censored due to a religious affiliation, if a concerned party views the book as religiously charged, or a certain religious group deems the book to be anti-religious. On the Origin of Species, by Charles Darwin, has been suppressed and challenged since publication in 1859 due to its discussion of the theory of Evolution. The Bible has also been censored all over the world, including Spanish versions of The Bible being banned in Spain from the sixteenth to the nineteenth century.
- Religious authority – Censorship occurs when the predominant religions actively suppress and destroy books with opposing views or ideologies that go against specific religious teachings. Historically, this form of censorship has been seen with the purging of Pagan books, the burning of Islamic libraries during the Crusades, and the destruction of Mayan history from the Aztecs and, later, the Spanish colonizers.
- Sexual content – Many parents will find any sort of sexual interaction within literature to be a cause for action. Concerned parties worry that reading books about sex will cause the reader to "think about, express interest in, or have sex." In 2013, the American Library Association ranked 50 Shades of Grey as number 4 on the annual study of challenged books for its graphic sexual content. In addition, The Country Girls, by Edna O'Brien, was banned by Ireland's censorship board in 1960 for the book's explicit sexual content.
- Violence or negativity – These books are censored due to violent and graphic scenes, or are considered to be damaging for readers. In Australia, How to Make Disposable Silencers, by Desert and Eliezer Flores was banned after being considered to "promote, incite, or instruct in matters of crime or violence". In France, Suicide mode d'emploi, by Claude Guillon, which reviews recipes for suicide, was banned and resulted in a law to be made which prohibits provocation to commit suicide and propaganda or advertisement of products, objects, or methods for committing suicide.
- Witchcraft – When a book uses magic or witchcraft. Harry Potter, by J.K. Rowling, was the #1 most challenged book series in 2001 and 2002, for the use of witchcraft, and for being satanic, according to the American Library Association.

== International book censorship ==
=== Nazi-era Germany ===
During the Second World War, the German Nazi party hosted frequent book burnings following seizures of property belonging to non-Nazi Germans. The burnings coincided with efforts to promote the so-called all-powerful Aryan race, instated in the government by Joseph Goebbels, the Nazi Minister for Popular Enlightenment and Propaganda. These events were seen as a symbolic cleanse for the German people, ridding their country and Aryan identity of anything that was 'un-German' in its ideals. The materials included in the burning were not limited to works made within the Weimar Republic of the time, and the blacklist being followed reached to American authors as well as socialist and communist works. Ultimately, the blacklist for book burnings was focused on any content that would threaten the totality of Nazi power in Germany. More than anything else, these book burnings aimed to remove Jewish cultural influence in Germany.

=== Ireland's Censorship of Publications Act of 1929 ===
Ireland's relationship with censorship was connected to the passing of the Censorship of Publications Act in 1929 as a result of an all-encompassing effort on the part of the Catholic Actions groups. The 1929 act would not be repealed until 1967. For the 38 years before the act was repealed, the status of Irish works was left completely at the whim of members of the Catholic Church. In accordance to the act, the censorship board put into place would be composed of a member of the Catholic Truth Society of Ireland (CTSI) or a Knight of St. Columbanus as well as three additional Catholics and a final Protestant. This congregation were tasked with deciding whether or not a work had any tendency towards the "indecent or obscene". For a work to be prohibited there was a required four-to-one majority following an intense analysis of the work for any potentially problematic content. Works that were deemed too provocative would be banned by the deciding board.

=== Apartheid regime of South Africa ===
The nearly 50-year period of Apartheid in South Africa, under influence of the severe policies of racial segregation, silenced the voices of many who were critical of the government. The censorship of such writings was legalized under the institution of the 1950 Suppression of Communism Act. This act was the government's tool to refute any anti-government propaganda being released against the Apartheid, allowing the works of any person who had left the country or who was considered to have acted against the state to be prohibited entirely. Banned people were marked with a Communist label, making it clear that no works being produced on their behalf were to be consumed by a South African Citizen.

It was not until the early 1990s when the South African government began a process of evaluating the banned materials looking to decide if certain works should still be considered prohibited in the country. This evaluation led to much of the considerations for prohibited materials to become limited to explicit topics instead of politically-driven messaging. Though some materials remained undesirable following this reevaluation, there were major publications that were then allowed to be distributed in South Africa. Especially notable was the country's growing openness to various works of political thinkers such as Nelson Mandela, Karl Marx and Vladimir Lenin. Credit for this new perspective can be offered towards an increasingly liberal political climate coming into place during the early 1990s.

=== Ukraine ban on Russian books ===
On December 30, 2016, president Petro Poroshenko of Ukraine signed into law a decree that restricts import of books into Ukraine from Russia. According to the law, a person can bring at most 10 Russian books without a permit. Unauthorized distribution of books from Russia is under a penalty. The State Committee for Television and Radio-broadcasting, whose duties include enforcing the information policy in Ukraine, is set in charge of book permits and is to issue bans on books deemed inappropriate which come "from territory of the aggressor state and from the temporarily occupied territory of Ukraine". Types of printed matter which require permits include books, brochures, children's books including coloring books, as well as maps, atlases, globes, etc. Each permit is to be entered into the special state register and is valid for at most five years. Bans are based on evaluations by a council of experts and may be contested.

== Challenged books ==
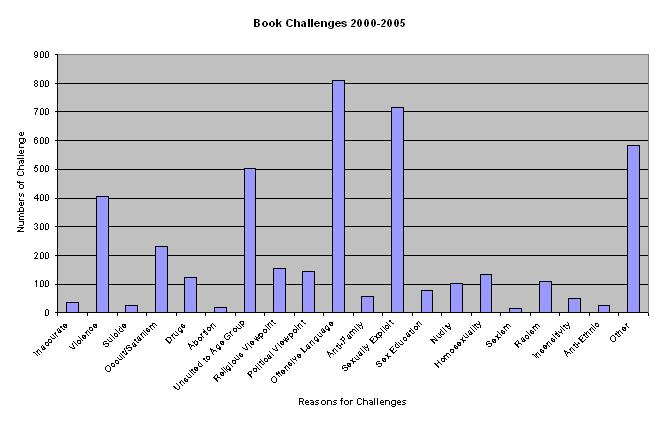
This graph shows the number of book challenges in the USA from 2000 to 2005 and the most popular reasons for the challenges.

== By country ==
- Book censorship in Canada
- Book censorship in China
- Book censorship in India
- Book censorship in Iran
- Book censorship in the Republic of Ireland
- Book censorship in the United Kingdom
- Book censorship in the United States

== See also ==
- Imprimatur
- Burning of books and burying of scholars
- List of authors and works on the Index Librorum Prohibitorum
- Freedom of the press
- Nazi book burnings
- Bowdlerization
