= Insect Dreams: The Half Life of Gregor Samsa =

2002 book by Marc Estrin

- First edition
- Author: Marc Estrin
- Language: English
- Publisher: Blue Hen
- Publication place: United States
- Media type: Print (binding)
- ISBN: 0-425-18860-4
- OCLC: 51988712

Insect Dreams: The Half Life of Gregor Samsa is a sequel to Franz Kafka's 1915 short-story The Metamorphosis, written in 2002 by Marc Estrin.

== Plot introduction ==
Gregor Samsa, the protagonist of The Metamorphosis, is revealed to have survived his apparent death at the end of the original story and goes on to have additional travels and experiences in the early-twentieth century.

== Plot summary ==
Rather than being thrown away like trash, Gregor Samsa was secretly sold to a Viennese sideshow by the Samsas' chambermaid. He then met various figures like Wittgenstein, Spengler and Albert Einstein and witnessed American Prohibition, the Scopes trial, was involved in Alice Paul's feminist movement, encountered the Ku Klux Klan, and conferred with U.S. President Franklin D. Roosevelt, and Robert Oppenheimer.

== Allusions and references to actual history, geography and current science ==
The novel made allusions to post-World War I Vienna through the Manhattan Project in Los Alamos, New Mexico.

== Critical reception ==
Mark Luce wrote that "Insect Dreams has flat moments, but Estrin gains confidence and lyricism as the novel progresses, especially in the Los Alamos section. He has written a wrenching, funny, learned and, at time, poetic novel about the curse of humanity." Melissa Mackenzie said "Insect Dreams is never dull. Fast-paced, clever, witty, this is literary entertainment of high order. With its many layers of philosophical possibilities, and its serious ethical questions, this is a novel that promises to be around for a long time."
