= The Gods Laugh on Mondays =

1995 novel by Reza Khoshnazar

The Gods Laugh on Mondays (in Persian: و خدايان دوشنبه‌ها مي‌خندند) was the first novel by an Iranian author with the pen name Reza Khoshnazar which was published in August 1995. It was a lurid chronicle of Iran in which the male protagonist is raped by his schoolmate, and can not be sure whether he liked it or not. He then marries a young woman who has an affair with his best friend. Eventually, the angst-ridden hero goes on a murder-suicide binge. This novel has been dedicated to Gregor Samsa, protagonist of novel The Metamorphosis by Franz Kafka. Reaction was hot, and some conservative papers called Gods a blasphemy. On the night of August 22, 1995, men arrived at the book publisher's shop identifying themselves as Islamic building inspectors. They set the building on fire. A head of Islamic propaganda (Ahmad Jannati) declared at Friday prayer that zealots are above the law. Reza Khoshnazar has published six other novels in Sweden.
