= LGBTQ literature in the United Kingdom =

LGBTQ+ literature, or queer literature, in the United Kingdom includes fiction, non-fiction, poetry, plays, and literary criticism that explore marginalised sexualities and gender identities. It includes literature written by gay, lesbian, trans, gender nonconforming and queer authors, and work by straight authors who explore LGBTQ+ characters, lives, and themes. LGBTQ+ literature and authors have been subject to book bans and imprisonment due to obscenity laws in the UK.

== Historical LGBTQ+ literature in Britain ==
In Who's Who in Lesbian and Gay Writing (2002), literary historian Gabriel Griffin explains that "part of the research on lesbian and gay history... has been the uncovering and recovery of lesbian and gay identities from times when those terms themselves were not in use". In 1981, women's studies scholar Bonnie Zimmerman claimed that studying lesbian literature was "plagued with the problem of definition". British fiction, poetry, plays, and literary criticism, taken as a whole invites "interpretation of categories of sexual identity as unstable", which can make it difficult to classify British LGBTQ+ literature over time.

British writers have described their genders and sexualities in various ways, and within books, plays, and poems, the behaviour, attitudes, or appearances of characters can be understood to link to ideas about genders and sexualities that might now be identified as "gay", "lesbian", or "queer", but in their historical context may have been named differently. Critics have identified explicit and implicit references to LGBTQ themes in British literature from historical literary periods.

=== Medieval literature ===
Although "the issue of the nature of sexuality in the past is hotly contested", medieval poetry and prose circulating in and written in the British Isles includes themes which may be identified as queer or LGBTQ+. A lack of attention to queer medieval literature, according to medievalist Eric Wade may be because historically scholars ignored these themes.

Work by Chaucer in the 14th century has been read to explore queer themes, including the Nun’s Priest’s Tale, and his version of the Legend of Thisbe includes "transgressive" desire.

Queer studies scholar Richard Zeikowitz has suggested that the 14th-century poem Sir Gawain and the Green Knight may be read as exploring anxiety about homosocial bonds: where the lines between friendship between men blur into romance. Medievalist Carolyn Dinshaw suggested that the poem may have been alluding to stories of Richard II and his relationships with men.

=== Early modern literature ===
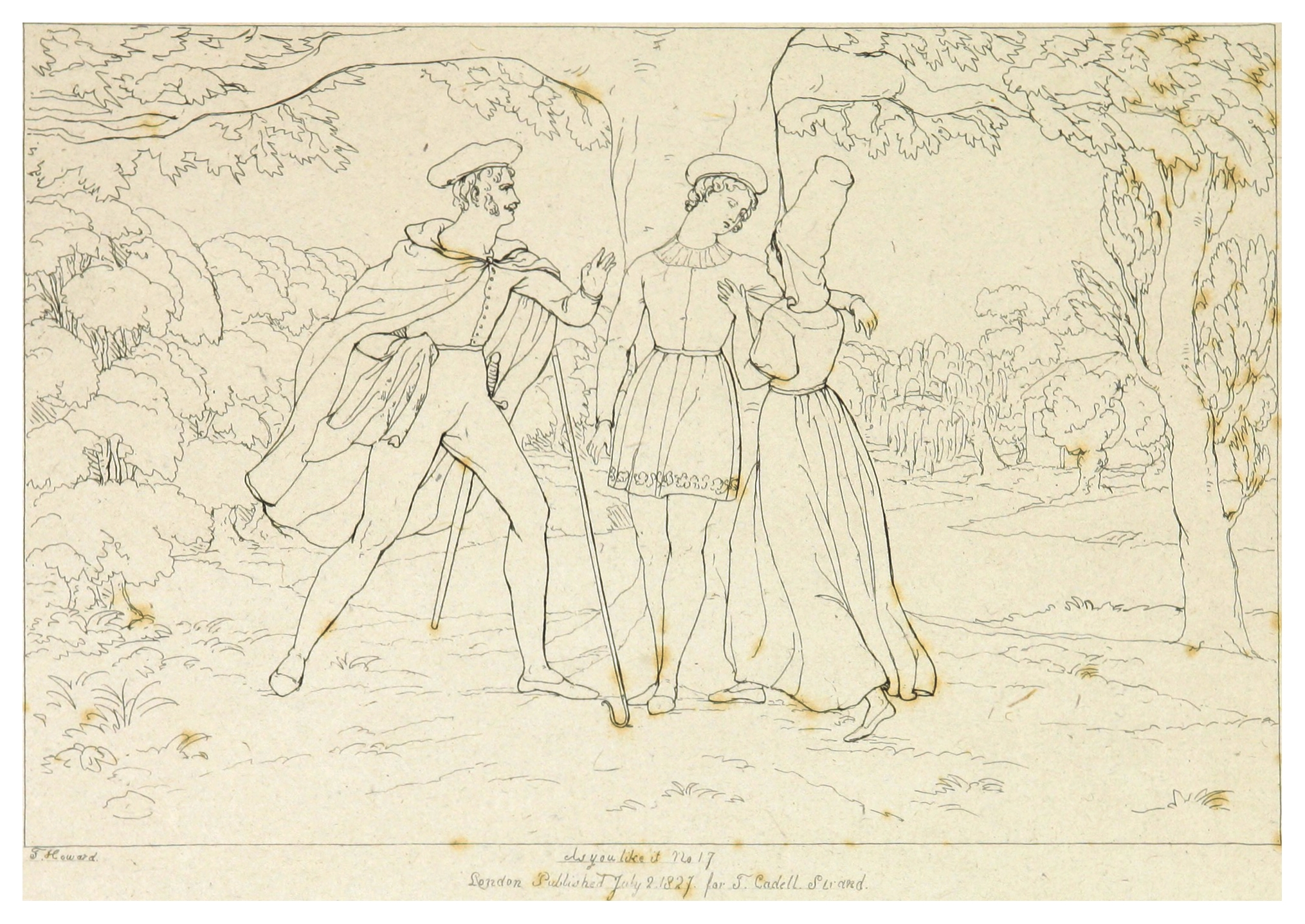
Shakespeare's play 'As you like it' includes characters who cross-dress, resulting in same-sex desire between characters.

Themes which may be identified today with LGBTQ+ sexualities and genders, including "cross dressing", "romantic friendships", and "lesbian romance" can be found in early modern British literature.

16th-century playwrights including William Shakespeare and Christopher Marlowe explored LGBTQ+ themes in their writing, including gender swaps, mistaken identities leading to same-sex encounters, and queer desire.

In the 16th century, Marie Maitland, "named the sixteenth-century Scottish Sappho", wrote explicitly lesbian poetry.

Through the 16th century and later, British writers made new work inspired by the Ancient Greek writing of Sappho or Classical Latin texts by Ovid exploring LGBTQ+ themes.

=== 19th century ===
The trial and imprisonment of Oscar Wilde for homosexual acts widely publicised his sexuality (already well-known in literary circles), and established Wilde within the LGBTQ+ British literary canon. Gothic Fiction authors including Matthew Lewis, William Thomas Beckford and Francis Lathom used the genre as a way to explore homosexuality in coded language and allusions.

In the UK lesbianism has never been criminalised in the same way that sexual relationships between men have been: some literary critics propose that this made lesbians - and work depicting them - invisible, making their recovery in later eras more difficult. Obscenity laws also prevented wide circulation of key queer texts through the 19th and 20th centuries.

=== 20th century ===
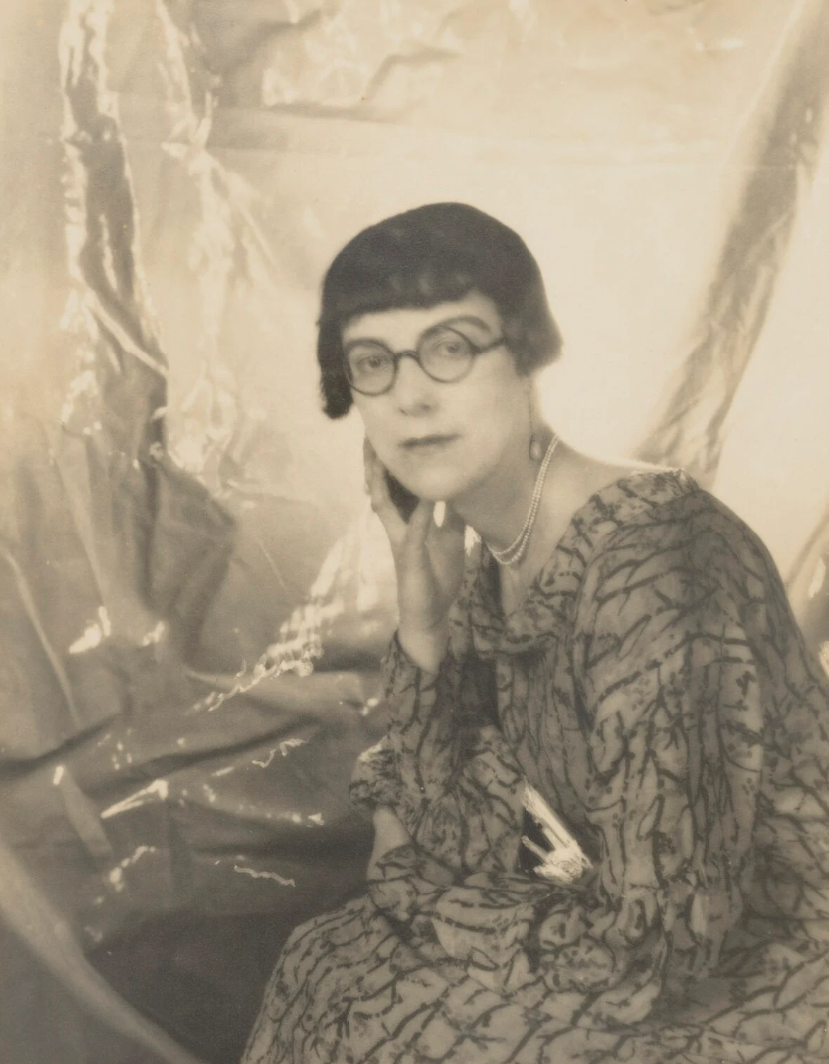
Sylvia Townsend Warner in 1930

==== Early 20th century ====
Networks of exchange and influence between English, American, and European writers are evident from the late 19th through the 20th century in LGBTQ+ literature in the UK, both between queer authors, and in examples of straight authors such as Graham Greene and Muriel Spark inspired by gay and lesbian authors including Evelyn Waugh and Ivy Compton-Burnett.

Radclyffe Hall's The Well of Loneliness, and work by Sylvia Townsend Warner are identified as important texts within British lesbian fiction.

Researchers working on the archive of Welsh writer Amy Dillwyn, 1845 – 1935, are revealing how "the same-sex desire that underpins her feminist fiction... went unnoticed by critics", as her biographer glossed over Dillwyn's sexuality, which is an example of challenges affecting identifying LGBTQ+ British literature.

Well known British authors involved in modernist movements, notably members of the Bloomsbury group, are known for exploring LGBTQ+ topics in their work, and for their queer personal lives. The eponymous character of Virginia Woolf's 1928 novel Orlando switches genders and expresses same sex desire. Literary critics and readers have found queer themes in her other works, while archival research has revealed Woolf's personal understandings of and explorations of sexuality.

==== Late 20th century ====
Critic Anita Pilgrim advises against generalisations of "Black British lesbian writing", noting how diverse forms of British literature emerged in the context of wider struggles for women's liberation and activism for racial equality in Britain through the 20th century.

E.M. Forster's 1971 novel Maurice explores the interplay between sexuality and class.

Gregory Woods argues that through the 20th and 21st centuries, although some queer literature in the UK has been celebrated in the canon, LGBTQ+ literature is still often marginalised. Woods cites Louie Crew and Rictor Norton to explain how "homosexual literature is not in the mainstream, not because the mainstream is heterosexual, but because the mainstream is homophobic", and even if gay literature is published by reputable publishers or win prizes, this does not necessarily translate to wider acceptance.

Openly gay writers including Maureen Duffy, Jackie Kay, Ali Smith, Jeanette Winterson, Hanif Kureishi, Alan Hollinghurst, Pat Barker, Sarah Waters, have also explored LGBTQ+ themes and characters in their work.

== Contemporary LGBTQ+ literary arts in Britain ==
British authors have contributed to efforts to create space for intersectional queer identities in British literature and literary arts.

=== Fiction ===
The British-Iraqi writer, film-maker, and drag performer Amrou Al-Kadhi contributed to the international anthology This Arab Is Queer; and London based Pluto Press have published authors including Lola Olufemi on Black feminist queer thought, and Yvette Taylor, examining working class queer identity through scholarship and memoire. However, critics have noted that queer working class and queer Black and Asian stories continue to be under represented across British publishing and literary culture.

LOTE, a novel by Shola von Reinhold, won the James Tait Black Prize and the Republic of Consciousness Prize 2021. The novel follows a PhD researcher examining the archive of queer, Black, trans-coded Scottish poet Hermia Druitt, and the protagonist's gender identity and sexuality are deliberately ambiguous.

=== Plays ===
Playwrights including Travis Alabanza have brought queer and trans* stories to international audiences.

Projects such as Black British Queer Plays and Practitioners: An Anthology of Afriquia Theatre (Methuen Drama 2022) have brought together new writing to tell new queer stories.

== Bookshops and institutions ==
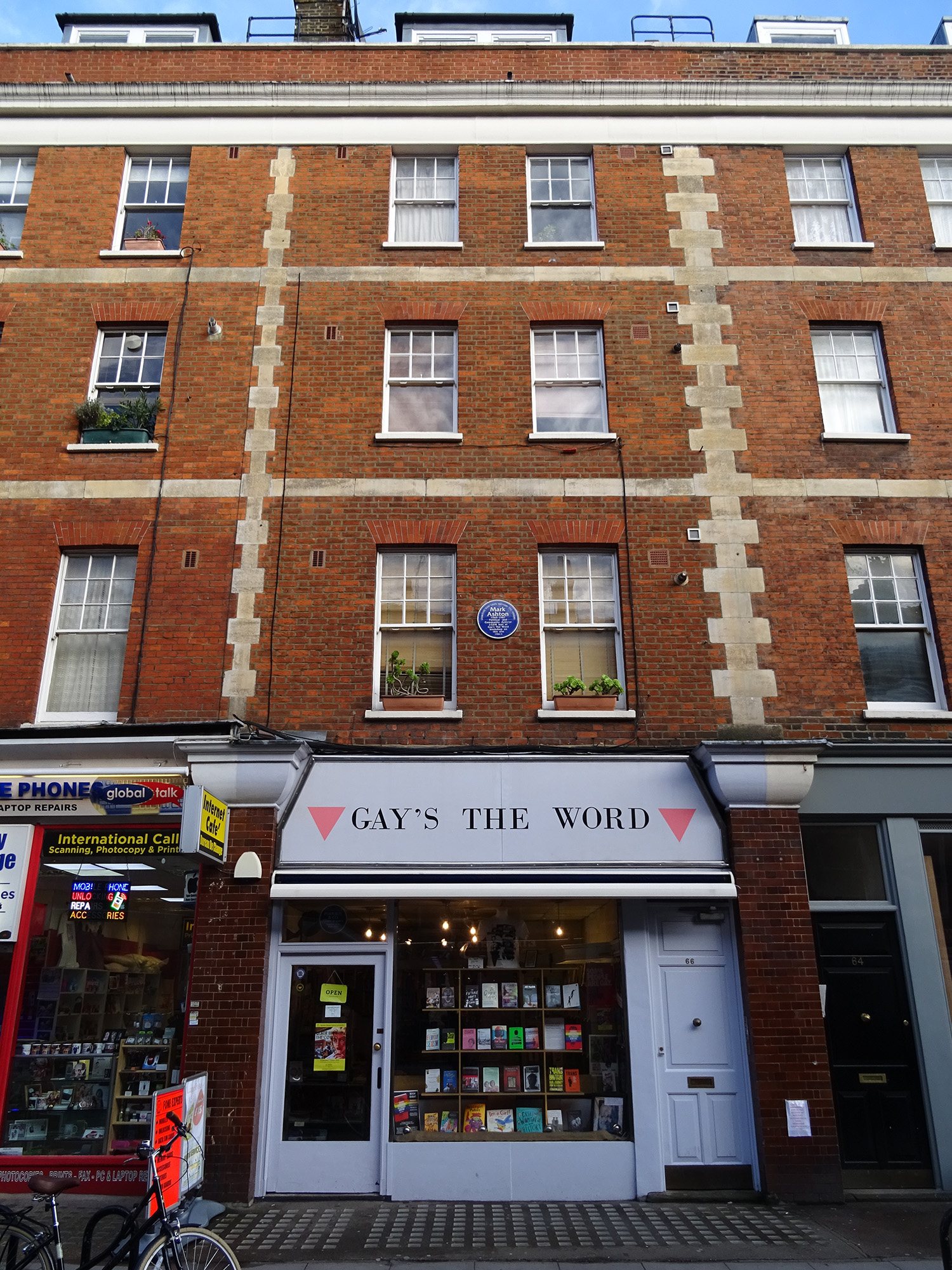
Gay's the Word, 66 Marchmont Street, London

=== Bookshops ===
In London, Gay's the Word founded was founded as the UK's first bookshop dedicated to gay literature in 1979. In Edinburgh, Scotland, the Lavender Menace bookshop was founded by Sigrid Nielsen and Bob Orr in 1982. The first Welsh LGBTQ+ bookstore, Paned o Gê, opened as an online store based out of Cardiff in 2021. Queer bookshops can now be found in many major UK towns and cities.

=== Literary prizes ===
Several lesbian, gay, and queer writers and books with LGBTQ+ themes have been awarded major UK-based literary prizes.

Alan Hollinghurst became the first openly gay writer to win the Booker Prize in 2004 with The Line of Beauty, a novel also exploring queer themes (the year after section 28 was repealed). Bernardine Evaristo won the Booker in 2019 with Girl, Woman, Other, which includes lesbian and non-binary characters; and Scottish-American Douglas Stuart won in 2020 with Shuggie Bain, a story about a young gay Scottish teenager. Queer winners of the Goldsmiths Prize for Fiction include Isabel Waidner and Ali Smith. The Goldsmiths prize originated at Goldsmiths University, known for its role in developing queer literary scholarship and teaching.

The Polari Prize was founded in 2011 as the first award in the UK and Ireland for queer writers ('Polari' references the subcultural language used by queer people through the 19th and 20th centuries).

=== School curricula and higher education ===
The 1980s saw further development in student politics and activism and the development of formal queer literary studies classes. Centre for Sexual Dissidence and Cultural Change at University of Sussex established by Alan Sinfield, in 1991 offered the first MA in queer studies in the UK, established after the passing of Section 28 into UK law in 1988, which had banned the 'promotion' of homosexuality. LGBTQ+ literatures now can be studied at several UK universities.

=== Activism and literature ===
British writers who are known for advocating for LGBTQ+ rights alongside activism in writers' rights, access to public libraries, and intersectional issues of race, class, and gender, include Maureen Duffy and Ali Smith.

=== Archives and special collections ===
Notable archives and special collections related to queer and LGBTQ+ literary history include:

- Bishopsgate Institute, London
- Feminist Library, Peckham, London
- Lavender Menace archive, Edinburgh
- The Lesbian Archive at Glasgow Women's Library
