= Book censorship in Iran =

Since the Iranian revolution in 1979, Article 24 of the Constitution of the Islamic Republic of Iran is assigned to the freedom of the press: "Publications and the press have freedom of expression except when it is detrimental to the fundamental principles of Islam or the rights of the public. The details of this exception will be specified by law". As the article states, two major boundaries should govern the freedom of expression: no harm to the principles of Islam; and no harm to the rights of the public.

The legal code or system of governing the press such as newspapers and magazines is detailed in the Press Law of 1979 ratified by the Council of the Islamic Revolution, the Press Law of 1986, and the Law on the Amendment of the Press Law of 2000 ratified by the Parliament.

In the field of books, the details of the restrictions of freedom of expression have been defined by the acts issued by the Supreme Council of Cultural Revolution. The first regulation in this regard was approved by the council in 1988 and put into force by the Ministry of Culture and Islamic Guidance. The act was titled Goals, Policies, and Terms of Book Publishing. It was revised in 2010, nearly 20 years later, and the new title is the Resolution of the Goals, Policies, and Terms of Book Publishing.

== Prohibited book topics ==
Article 4 of the resolution of 2010 introduces 28 book topics that may cause spreading profligate and disturbance in public rights, and thus are prohibited. The topics can be categorized under three main subtopics and each subtopic includes at least eight sub themes. The regulation requires the Ministry of Culture and Islamic Guidance fight back against these negative aspects of publishing books. As stated in the resolution, the following are some of the forbidden themes that must not appear in the contents of books.

=== Religion and morality ===
1. Propagation of disbelief, denial or distortion of Islamic principles and codes, distortion of the faces of the personalities of Islam who are respected, and distorting historical religious events that will ultimately lead to the denial of religious principles;

2. Insulting the sanctities of Islam and propagating against the teachings of the principles of Islam;

3. Propagating and promoting perverted, obsolete, distorted and heretic religions and sects;

4. Promoting superstition and undermining Islam;

5. Mentioning details of sexual intercourse, sins, vulgar and obscene so that it promotes prostitution;

6. Using sex appeal and pictures of naked women or men as works of art or as any other title;

7. Publishing pictures such as dancing, lushing and vice parties that lead to the proliferation of prostitution;

8. Promoting philosophical and ethical materialism and the lifestyles which are contrary to Islamic values and ethics;

9. Misrepresenting Islam and true Muslims as a religion of violence.

=== Politics and society ===
1. Insulting, character assassinating, or defaming Imam Khomeini and the Supreme Leader, the president, maraji, and all others whose respect is religiously or legally required;

2. Propaganda against the Constitution and the Islamic Revolution and confrontation with them;

3. Instigating the community to revolt against the Islamic Republic and Islamic Revolution;

4. Promulgating militant groups and counterrevolutionary elements, terrorists, secular systems, royal and Pahlavi monarchy, and purifying their negative faces;

5. Propagating and promulgating dependency to authoritarian powers and opposing the country's independence;

6. Propaganda against national interests and security, and misrepresenting the Islamic Republic as a dysfunctional government;

7. Doing harm and creating doubts in the national unity and the territorial integrity of the country and making chaos, conflict and disputes among different ethnic groups and religions;

8. Undermining and ridiculing national pride, patriotism, scientific and practical capabilities of Iranians, national culture, and Iranian ethnic groups;

9. Spreading and advertising the loss of self-identity against foreign civilization and implanting the sense of backwardness among people;

10. Propaganda of Zionism and other forms of racism;

11. Distorting important historical events of Iran and Islam.

=== Public rights and culture ===
1. Insulting and ridiculing language, culture and identity of ethnic groups, and ethnic and religious minorities;

2. Promulgating law breaking and debauching;

3. Propagating against family and undermining its value and position;

4. Spreading hopelessness, frustration, absurdity, and negative attitudes in society and increasing public mistrust;

5. Scorning and ridiculing different classes of society;

6. Propagating national and international cultural and artistic corrupted people;

7. Illegal disclosure of classified civil and military documents;

8. Degrading the identity of the national language.

== Print and distribution permits for books ==
Iranian publishers are required to obtain not only publishing licenses to establish a book publishing center, they should also apply for print and distribution permits from the Ministry of Culture and Islamic Guidance for each book that they plan to publish. As stated in Article 3 of the Bylaw on Issuing a Book Print Permit (2005), the permits are valid for next reprints as long as no changes are made to the content and the publisher has not changed and/ or has not received any notification from the Ministry that require content modification.

According to Article 2 of the bylaw, in order to obtain a book permit, along with the file of the book, the publisher would fill out an application form called evaluation form and would include the book specifications (such as the title, author, translator, editor, circulation, number of pages, subject ) and submit them to the special office in the Ministry.

== Books banned in Iran ==
In Iran, banned books are the books that are prohibited by the government (Ministry of Culture and Islamic Guidance) to be printed and distributed. Some books are rejected to receive print and distribution permits and some books receive notifications stating the deletions and alterations which are necessary to be applied to the content in order to receive the permits. In some cases, after distribution of the book, the permits are revoked for next editions. There are also cases in which a book does not receive permits in one period but the same book is permitted by the Ministry of Guidance in another period.

The following titles are some of the books that have either not received permits or whose permits have been revoked after some time. Some of the titles may have received permits later.

Title	Author	Type of literature	References and notes
ketāb-e sādeq-e hedāyat (The Book of Sadegh Hedayat)	Mahmoud Katiraie		
āyāt-e sheytāni (The Satanic Verses)	Salman Rushdie	novel	
khodāyān doshanbehā mikhandand (The Gods Laugh on Mondays)	Reza Khoshnazar	novel	
antari ke lutiyash morde bud (The Monkey Whose Owner Had Died)	Sadeq Chubak	short stories	
sang-e sabur (The Patient Stone)	Sadeq Chubak	short stories	
azādārān-e bayal (The Mourners of Bayal)	Gholam-Hossein Saedi	short stories	
dandil (Dandyl)	Gholam-Hossein Saedi	short stories	
tars o larz (Fear and Trembling)	Gholam-Hossein Saedi	short stories	
tup (The Ball)	Gholam-Hossein Saedi	short stories	
Censoring an Iranian Love Story	Shahriar Mandanipour	novel	
chashmhāyash (Her Eyes)	Bozorg Alavi	novel	
sangi bar guri (A Tombstone on a Grave)	Jalal Al-e-Ahmad	novel	
rowze-ye qāsem (Mourning for Qasem)	Amir Hossein Cheheltan	novel	
mardi ke dar qobār gom shod (The Man Lost in Dust)	Nosrat Rahmani	poetry	
majmue ash'ār-e ahmad-e shāmlu (A Collection of Poems of Ahmad Shamlu)	Ahmad Shamlu	poetry	
dokhtari bā rismān-e noqrei (A Girl with a Silver String)	Jamal Mirsadeqi	short story	
khāterāt-e delbarakān-e qamgin-e man (Memories of My Melancholy Whores)	Gabriel García Márquez	novella	translated into Persian by Kaveh Mirabasi
aqrab ru-ye pellehāye rāhāhan-e andimeshk (Scorpion on the Railroad Stairways of Andimeshk, or Blood's Dripping From This Train)	Hossein Mortezaeian Abkenar	novel	
ādābe biqarāri (The Ceremonies of Impatience)	Yaghub Yadali	short stories	
tārikhe-e ejtemāiye irān (Social History of Iran)	Morteza Ravandi		
ramz-e dāvinchi (The Da Vinci Code)	Dan Brown	novel	Translated by Hossin Shahrabi
buf-e kur (The Blind Owl)	Sadeq Hedayat	novel	
shāhed bāzi dar adabiyāt-e fārsi (Gay Relations in Persian Literature)	Sirus Shamisa	literary essay	
zanān-e parde neshin va nokhbegān-e jowshan push (The Veiled Women and the Armoured Elite)	Fatemeh Marnisi	history	
zahir (The Zahir)	Paulo Coelho	novel	Translated by Arash Hejazi
sāl-e sefr (The Year Zero)	Ardalan Sarafraz	novel	
dāde bidād (The Shout of No Shout")	Vida Hajebi		
Lessons to Avoid AIDS			
faqr va fahshā (Poverty and Adultery)	Masood Dehnamaki		
afyun (Opium)	Shiva Arastooi	short stories	
jen nāme (The Book of Genies)	Houshang Golshiri	novel,	
az shytān āmukht va suzānd (He Learned from Satan and Burnt It)	Farkhondeh Aghaii	novel	
zanān bedun-e mardān (Women without Men)	Shahrnoosh Parsipour	novel	
ākharin vasvasehā-ye masih (The Last Temptation of Christ)	Nikos Kazantzakis		
khorus (Cockcrow)	Ebrahim Golestan	short stories	
be su-ye sarnevesht (Towards Destiny)	Akbar Hashemi Rafsanjani		
tubā va ma'nā-ye shab (Touba and the Meaning of Night)	Shahrnush Parsipur	novel	
shab-e howl (Night of Fear)	Hormoz Shahdadi	novel	
