= Marc Estrin =

American writer and political activist (1939–2025)

Marc Estrin (April 20, 1939 – August 10, 2025) was an American writer and political activist.

== Early life and education ==
Estrin was born in Brooklyn, New York, on April 20, 1939. He attended Queens College, studying chemistry and biology, then studied theater directing at UCLA. Estrin came to novel-writing late. In the fall of 1998, he and his wife Donna were on holiday in Prague and decided to visit the grave of Franz Kafka, whose work had always been important to him. His father had challenged him to read The Magic Mountain during the summer before he attended college. He left a note on the grave, inviting Kafka to drop by if he ever found himself in Burlington. Through the 1960s he worked in various repertory theaters in the United States, including the Pittsburgh Playhouse and the San Francisco Actor's Workshop. But the Vietnam War and Bertold Brecht inspired him to become politically active.

He helped found and was the first coordinator of the Burlington Peace and Justice Center, working on anti-war campaigns, and most recently stood for seven years in all weather with a Monday-through-Friday peace vigil in Burlington. His current political work focuses on two arenas: a just settlement between Palestine and Israel and what he considers to be crucially unanswered questions of 9/11. These political issues are discussed in some of his writings. In 1985, he enrolled in the Starr King School for the Ministry and became an ordained Unitarian Universalist minister in 1988, and was active in the church, but found it conflicted with his political work. He was also a cellist and vocalist who worked with several orchestras including the Vermont Philharmonic Orchestra, the Lyric Theater Orchestra, the Vermont Symphony Chorus.

== Writing career ==
Estrin said that the concept, an outline and the opening episodes of Insect Dreams arrived in Vermont one morning at 3 AM, three weeks after he visited Kafka's grave. Insect Dreams appeared from BlueHen/Putnam in 2002. Since then it has been re-released (by Unbridled Books). The book has the insect/man from Franz Kafka's The Metamorphosis meet several historical literary figures. The New York Times mentioned the character's generosity and "heroic persistence." The Washington Post questioned whether fiction was the best vehicle for Estrin's passion for ideas. The San Francisco Chronicle placed it in one of their top 100 books for the year in 2002. The book has been the subject of analysis regarding Estrin's use of proverbial material.

Insect Dreams was not the first Estrin book to be published. In 1971, Dell Publishing released reCreation: Some Notes on What’s What and What You Might Be Able To Do About What’s What, a Whole Earth Catalog-like book which fat acceptance movement has considered helpful. In 2004, Chelsea Green released an analysis by Estrin of the work of Peter Schumann through his cultural activist theater. Of The Lamentations of Julius Marantz (Unbridled Books, 2007), the reviewer for the San Francisco Chronicle said the story had heart, but turned into a "bit of a nonnarrative mess" at the end, and The New York Times said it was full of anachronistic mistakes, and the protagonist dull, the book full of Estrin's own enthusiasms.

== Death ==
Estrin died from heart failure on August 10, 2025, at the age of 86.

== Bibliography ==
=== Books ===
- reCreation: Some Notes on What's What and What You May Be Able To Do About What's What, collected, constructed, and edited by Marc Estrin, Dell Publishing, 1971.
- Insect Dreams: The Half Life of Gregor Samsa, Putnam/Blue Hen, 2002. ISBN 0-399-14836-1
- Rehearsing With Gods: Photographs and Essays on the Bread & Puppet Theater: by Ronald T Simon, text by Marc Estrin; Chelsea Green Publishing Company. ISBN 1-931498-19-9
- The Education of Arnold Hitler, Unbridled Books, 2005. ISBN 1-932961-03-8
- Golem Song, Unbridled Books, 2006. ISBN 1-932961-23-2
- The Lamentations of Julius Marantz, Unbridled Books, 2007. ISBN 1-932961-38-0
- The Annotated Nose, Unbridled Books, 2008. ISBN 1-932961-57-7
