= Reza Khoshnazar =

Reza Khoshbin-e Khoshnazar (Persian: رضا خوش‌بين خوش‌نظر) is an Iranian novelist who published his first novel, The Gods Laugh on Mondays in 1995 when he was in his twenties. The reaction was hot and some conservative papers accused him of writing blasphemy and some zealots compared him with Salman Rushdie. Eventually, men came in the night and torched his publisher book shop, Morghe-Amin Publication House, in Tehran.

Author Khoshnazar has published six other novels in Sweden with Ferdosi Publication House entitled: The Prophet with the Head like a Squash in the Shadow of Dead Clock (Persian: پيغمبر كلّه كدو زير ساعت مرده), The End of Owl (Persian: آخر جغد), Tetraktus, the Damn Four (Persian: تتراكتوس، چهار لعنتي), Squint eyed and eyes of crows (Persian: لوچ ها و چشم آغول ها), Nebraska Syndrome (Persian: سندروم نبراسکا), and My red ass baboons (Persian: انتران کون سرخ من).
