= Fran Estévez =

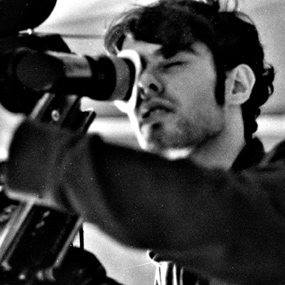
- During the filming of Metamorfosis (2003).
- Born: Francisco José Estévez García; 11 April 1980 (age 46); Vilagarcía de Arousa, Galicia, Spain
- Education: School of Cinematic Arts of Galicia
- Occupations: Film director; producer; screenwriter

Francisco José Estévez García (born April 11, 1980) is a Spanish filmmaker born in Vilagarcía de Arousa, Pontevedra.

He was part of the first class of the School of Cinematic Arts of Galicia. The sci-fi short film Equinoccio (Equinox) (school thesis in 35 mm). Founder of the production company Hipotálmo Films, from which in 2004 directed Metamorfosis (Metamorphosis), adaptation of the popular tale of Franz Kafka which is worth many awards and commendations. He has also made the short film El Humanoide (Humanoid) (2007) and the short experimental Titanio & Plutonio (Titanium & Plutonium) (2010).

His most ambitious film was made in 2013 Idiotas (Idiots), starring a guy with a disability and his talking dog who find mysterious balloons across the city of Santiago de Compostela with a curious message: "Deflate me little by little...".

== Filmography ==
- Idiotas. Director, writer, musician. (2013)
- Titanio & Plutonio en el País del Ciclograma. Director, actor, storyboard, post, musician. (2010)
- El Humanoide. Director, actor (contortionist), editor, soundman. (2007)
- La Canción de Fémerlin. Assistant director, editor, musician. (2005)
- Metamorfosis. Director, writer, editor, sound engineer, musician. (2004)
- Equinoccio. Director, screenwriter. (2003)
- Ipso Facto. Editor, musician. (2003)
- Fandango. Director, editor. (2003)
- Ruido Blanco. Editor, musician. (2002)
- Hipotálamo. Director, producer, screenwriter, musician. (2002)
