= Gerard Colby =

American author

Gerard Colby (earlier known as Gerard Colby Zilg) (born 1950) is an author and past president of the US National Writers Union, where he previously held various chair positions. From 1997 to 2001 he served as chair of the Vermont section.

He is notable for authoring Du Pont: Behind The Nylon Curtain. The 1974 publication was put under contract by Prentice-Hall in anticipation of a significant quantity of books sold to Book of the Month. The book painted a portrait of DuPont enterprises and the DuPont family that was characterized as "sober but unflattering" by some but as presenting a Marxist interpretation of the company by others. In response to pressure from DuPont, Book-of-the-Month cancelled its preorder. In anticipation of lower sales, Prentice-Hall reduced its print run and scaled back its marketing plans. Colby (Zilg) sued Prentice-Hall for breach of contract. In the federal case Zilg v Prentice-Hall, Inc., the Federal District Court in New York awarded Colby damages of $24,000. In 1984 the Court of Appeals for the Second Circuit overturned the ruling. The US Supreme Court refused to hear an appeal the same year. The suit is an important example of case law relating to the practice of privishing (private publishing) where a publishing house reduces its print run and support of a book so much that the book fails to reach the public.

== State Politics ==
Colby ran for the Vermont State Senate seat for Lamoille County in 2012 and 2016 but lost both races.

== Honors and awards ==
In 2003 he received the National Press Club's "Arthur Rouse Award for Press Criticism" for the book Into the Buzzsaw: Leading Journalists Expose the Myth of a Free Press (Prometheus Books, 2002) that was edited by the co-award winner Kristina Borjesson.

== Personal life ==
Colby is married to writer Charlotte Dennett and lives in Lamoille County, Vermont.

== Bibliography ==
- Du Pont: Behind The Nylon Curtain. Prentice-Hall, 1974. 600+ pages, by Gerard Colby Zilg, ISBN 0-13-221077-0
- Du Pont Dynasty: Behind the Nylon Curtain. Secaucus NJ: Lyle Stuart, 1984. 968 pages, by Gerard Colby, ISBN 0-8184-0352-7
- Thy Will Be Done, the Conquest of the Amazon: Nelson Rockefeller and Evangelism in the Age of Oil HarperCollins, 1995, Hardcover. 960 pages, by Gerard Colby and Charlotte Dennett, ISBN 0-06-016764-5; HarperCollins: Janice Temple, 1996, Paperback.1008 pages, ISBN 0-06-092723-2
- Into The Buzzsaw: Leading Journalists Expose the Myth of a Free Press (2002) as collaborator, author of Chapter 1, The Price of Liberty. The book is an anthology on the current state of investigative journalism in the US and was an Amazon.com top-ten best-seller.
