= Book censorship in the United Kingdom =

Unlike in some other countries, there are no lists of state-banned books in the United Kingdom, and no specific book censorship laws. Book censorship has instead been a demand or outcome of other national laws or local policies, and pressure from newspapers, public grassroots protests, and lobby organisations. Historically, organisations including the Proclamation Society, the Society for the Suppression of Vice, and the National Vigilance Association played roles in lobbying for book censorship.

The Index on Censorship and Banned Books Week UK are among organisations who track bans or censorship, and call for freedom of literary expression. Professional librarian bodies, including the Chartered Institute of Library and Information Professionals (CILIP), School Libraries Group, and School Library Association have also issued statements in favour of "intellectual freedom". Books covering topics including LGBTQ rights and relationships, feminism, social justice, race, and empire, have been subject to recent censorship in UK school libraries.

== Censorship laws ==
The first Obscene Publications Act passed in 1857, but was challenged by the 1868 Regina v Hicklin case due to a lack of definition of "obscenity". The case defined "obscene" as that which "tends to deprave and corrupt", and provided what became known as the Hicklin test to determine whether a publication fit that definition. This act, and later iterations of it, prosecuted authors and banned the publication, importing, or sale of books on the basis of a variety of reasons, including explicit descriptions of sex, sexually transmitted disease, and homosexuality, or the potential to corrupt women and children.

Under Winston Churchill's Conservative government, "chief constables received a copy of a secret Blue Book [...] which contained the titles of 4,000 books and magazines. This list effectively put a blanket ban on the titles mentioned". In 1954, a high of 167,000 books were destroyed.

Although not a book-banning law per se, Section 28, introduced by Margaret Thatcher's Conservative government in 1988, made it illegal to "promote homosexuality".

In 2023, the Department for Education, as part of the Conservative government under Rishi Sunak, proposed guidance that school libraries should not include materials with "contested ideology"; LGBTQ+ literature was affected alongside lessons which covered gender and sexuality.

== Cases of censorship or attempted censorship ==
=== 19th century ===
The Family Shakespeare (1807), is an expurgated version of Shakespeare's plays by Henrietta Maria Bowdler, and published by her brother Thomas Bowdler. The term "bowdlerization" stems from their efforts to sanitise the work.

=== 20th century ===
Radclyffe Hall's The Well of Loneliness was "banned after official medical advice that it would encourage female homosexuality and lead to 'a social and national disaster'" due to its lesbian kiss scene.

In 1948, the Attorney General refused to ban Norman Mailer's The Naked and the Dead, "despite popular pressure".

In 1954, a magistrate in Swindon ordered that copies of a 14th-century story collection, The Decameron by Boccaccio, be destroyed. The resulting "public backlash" resulted in a Home Office review which found that books more than 100 years old and "recognised as classics" should be exempt from obscenity laws.

In a 1963 trial to challenge a long-standing ban on Fanny Hill brought by publishers Mayflower books, part of the argument for retaining the ban hinged on the fact that, as well as an expensive edition, a cheaper version was available and was therefore accessible to a wider audience.

=== 21st century ===
The 2020s have seen an increase in the number of calls from British newspapers and journalists to ban books with LGBTQ+ themes. A 2023 study by CILIP, found that "a third of UK librarians had been asked by members of the public to censor or remove books, did identify themes of race and empire as among the most targeted, along with LGBTQ+".

In 2025, a school headteacher in Manchester ordered the librarian to remove books, starting with Laura Bates’ Men Who Hate Women. The order expanded to remove over 100 books which explore themes of race and racism, violence against women and feminism, and queer stories.

== Responses by librarians and banned authors ==
In 2024, Young Adult author Simon James Green (who had his visit to a school cancelled by a Catholic diocese in the UK) responded to an Index on Censorship report finding that more books are being removed from libraries: "one of the worrying aspects of the UK situation is that a lot of this is happening under the radar, with certain books being quietly removed from shelves or simply not acquired in the first place... It’s shocking. LGBTQ+ people exist. Get over it. Why are we still having this conversation?".

Former CILIP CEO Louis Coiffait-Gunn said in 2024 "Authors, publishers, teachers, school leaders, and librarians all have a duty to work together to ensure that every child has the opportunity to discover the wide and wonderful world of reading. That’s especially important for children who may not get such opportunities at home. CILIP’s work on inclusive collections and intellectual freedom helps resist censorship, deliver trustworthy information, and empower learners".
