= Book censorship in India =

Book censorship in India has existed at least since the British period, and several books remain banned by the central and state governments.

Books criticizing major religions of India, as well as books supposedly portraying national figures including Gandhi and Nehru in a bad light continue to remain banned.

== History ==
=== Post Independence ===
During the 1960s, following the Sino-Indian war, Chinese books and magazines were banned.

Beginning in 1975, India banned Quotations from Chairman Mao Zedong.

After protests by Muslims and a petition by Syed Shahabuddin to the Rajiv Gandhi government, The Satanic Verses was banned in 1988, with India becoming the first country to ban the book.

== Topics ==
=== Religious ===
Many books in India are or were banned for disagreeing with Islam and Hinduism's teachings.

=== Political ===
Many books in India were banned for criticizing India and its government or political systems.

=== Historical ===
Books were banned for criticizing Gandhi and other important Indian historical figures.

=== Obscenity ===
The Scented Garden: Anthropology of the Sex Life in the Levant was banned due to sexually explicit content.

== See also ==
- The Calcutta Quran Petition
