= Mohammed Said Hjiouj El-Sahili =

Moroccan novelist (born 1982)

Mohammed Said Hjiouij
- محمد سعيد احجيوج
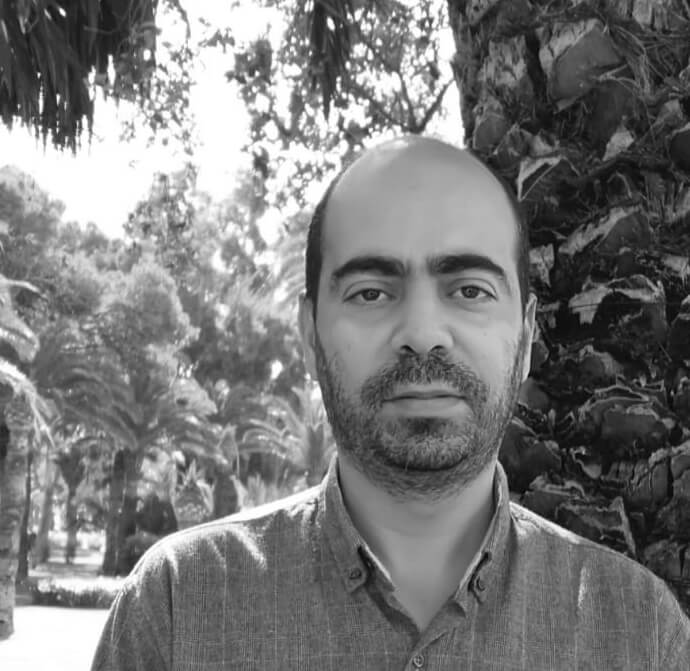
- Born: April 1, 1982 (age 44); Tangier, Morocco
- Occupation: Novelist
- Writing career
- Notable works: "By Night In Tangier" (original title: Layl Tanja); "Kafka in Tangier" (original title: Kafka fi Tanja); "The riddle of Edmond Amran El Maleh" (original title: Ahjiyat Edmun Amran El Maleh)
- Notable awards: Ismail Fahd Ismail Prize for Novella
- Website: hjiouij.com

Mohammed Said Hjiouij Sahli (Arabic: محمد سعيد احجيوج الساحلي; born April 1, 1982) is a Moroccan novelist and blogger. He is known for his short novel By Night In Tangier, which won the inaugural Ismail Fahd Ismail Prize, and his book ABC of Blogging ('alfiba' altadwin). He is the founder of Zajil tech blog and Arabisk award, and was head of the Moroccan Center of Modern Technology.

== Career ==
In 2003, Hjiouij established a newspaper that specialized in technology, which was his first field work in the publishing sector. Due to underfunding, there were only two issues of the newspaper. A year later, and with the help of two of his friends, he established Literary Tangier (Tanjat al'adbia), a monthly newspaper on culture and literature, which was issued for more than two years, rather sporadically however.

In 2004, Hjiouij published his first two collections of short stories, The Occurrence of Things ('ashya' tahduth) and Postponed Suicide. He also wrote poetry and won several prizes for it. One of these was the "Tangier, The Poetess" prize, in recognition of his poem "Al-Hallaj’s Breakdown," and was ranked first at the Arab level.

In April 2005, he launched a number of small projects that serves the purpose of blogging. His interest in blogging sprouted from his desire to invest in the fields of e-publishing and new media, and to enrich content in Arabic on the Internet. Few of his projects include the electronic journal "Madaraat," and "Blogging without borders" journal, which was created to empower blogging in the Arab World. He then wrote his first book, ABC of Blogging ('alfiba' altadwin), which provides insight into the theoretical and practical fundamentals of blogging. Over the next two years, he keenly traced the restrictions faced by bloggers in the Arab World, and developed the initiative into a project under the name of "The Observatory of Bloggers." This contributed to his increasing activity as a blogger, till he decided to devote himself to blogging as his full-time career in 2009.

After filling the position of a blogger for a year, Hjiouij created the Arabisk contest, which is held annually, as means to develop a sense of creativity among young bloggers and, thus, reward the distinguished candidates for their contribution. Due to the lack of success of the second version of the contest and his shift in interest from blogging to entrepreneurship, Hjiouij sold Arabisk project to Mo’amer Amer, and launched "Al-Mirqaab" project, which aimed at facilitating the sharing of links, as an Arabic clone of Digg and Reddit.

In 2010, Mohammed Said Hjiouij was appointed Head of the Moroccan Center of Modern Technology, after holding the inaugural meeting. A year later, he launched his "Zajil" project, which was later purchased by Hsoub Limited company, and renamed to "Arabia Weekly News." Likewise, "Al-Mirqaab" project was sold and renamed as "Agabany" by the purchaser. In 2012, Hjiouij co-founded a company that specializes in e-marketing, in which he initially filled the position of a CTO, and as an COO afterwards.

Hjiouij's activities of blogging and entrepreneurship caused him to stop producing literary work for a period of over ten years. This period ended in 2019, when Mohammed Said Hjiouij published the short novel, Kafka fi Tanja (Kafka in Tangier). An excerpt from this story was translated into Hebrew. The plot of the novel caused an outcry ^{(Where?)} as it sheds light on sensitive subjects including, firstly, the duality of good and evil, particularly the villainy that lies within every human being and that could slip out of control at any moment; secondly, the disintegration of an Arab family and the heavy reliance on the members’ shared interests as the only bond that keeps them together; and, thirdly, the normalization of moral corruption, sexism and betrayal among spouses and families. In January 2022, arab.lit magazine announced an online serialized translation into English of Kafka in Tangier.

Hjiouij's unpublished novella Layl Tanja (By Night In Tangier) won the 2019 Ismail Fahd Ismail Prize for short novels and was scheduled to be published by Dar Al-Ain in September, 2021. In September, 2020, he published his second short novel, Ahjiyat Edmun Amran El Maleh (Edmond Amran El Maleh’s Puzzle).

== Works ==
=== Short story collections ===
- The Occurrence of Things (original title: Ashyaa’ Tahdoth), Tangier, 2004.
- Postponed Suicide (original title: Intihaar Marga’), Literary Tangier, 2006.

=== Books ===
- Morocco as it is (original title: Al-Maghreb Kama Huwa), 2006.
- ABC of Blogging (original title: Alef Ba’a Al-Tadween), 2006.
- Administrative Nuggets (original title: Shazaraat Idaariyah), 2016.
- Don’t Be a Scapegoat: The End of Job Security (original title: La Takun Kabshan: Nihayat Al-Amaan Al-Wazifi), 2016.

=== Short novels ===
- By Night In Tangier (original title: Layl Tanja), Dar Al Ain Publishing House, Cairo, 2019.
- Kafka in Tangier (original title: Kafka fi Tanja), Dar Tabarak for Publishing and Distribution, Cairo, 2019.
- Edmond Amran El Maleh’s Puzzle (original title: Ahjiyat Edmun Amran El Maleh), Hachette Antoine Publishing House, Beirut, 2020.

== Other contributions ==
=== Blog-related projects ===
- "Tangier Net" newspaper (original title: Jaridat Tanja Net), 2003.
- "Literary Tangier" journal (original title: Majalat Tanja Al-Adabiya), 2004–2005.
- "Orbits" electronic journal (original title: Majalat Madarat Al-Iliktroniya), 2004–2006. This journal addresses different cultural topics. Hjiouij initially worked as the editor of the journal, and later became the founder of its blog network website. His goal was to encourage the contribution of talented and creative Arab youth to the blog.
- "Blogging without limits" electronic journal (original title: Majalat Al-Tadween Bi-La Hudood Al-Iliktroniya), 2005–2006.
- "The Observatory of Bloggers" project (original title: Mirsad Al-Mudawineen), 2006–2008.
- "Arabisk" contest for Arab blogs (original title: Musabaqat Arabesk Lil-Mudawanaat Al-Arabiya), 2009–2010.
- Head of the Moroccan Center of Modern Technology, 2010–2011.
- "Al-Mirqaab" project, 2011.
- "Zajil" project, 2011. In its trial version, the website offered participants tools to design their personal pages on the Internet, and build their digital ID that provides a brief overview of their profile along with their contact information. In its pivoted version, the website served the fields of technology and entrepreneurship by providing participants with important news topics in technology and trends in entrepreneurship development. Not only does the website present news reports, rather it analyzes the news based on background information. Participants can also subscribe to the website newsletter, "Technews," which is a collection of the most prominent news topics and articles in technology gathered from Arabic websites.

== Awards ==
- He was ranked first in the "Creative Poetry" contest (original title: Musabaqat Al-Ibdaa Al-Shi’ri) for his poem, "Al-Mutanabbi’s Suicide in Al-Hallaj’s Ashes" (original title: Intihar Al-Mutanabbi fi Rimad Al-Hallaj). The contest was organized by the Officer's Club in Larache, in 2002.
- He was ranked third in a poetry contest for his poem "The Songs of Muhammad Al-Durrah" (original title: Aghani Muhammad Al-Durrah). The contest was organized by the Union of Moroccan Writers in Tangier, in 2003.
- He was awarded "Tangier, The Poetess" prize, in recognition to his poem "Al-Hallaj’s Breakdown" (original title: Inkisarat Al-Hallaj), in which he came first place in 2004.
- He was awarded the Ismail Fahd Ismail Prize for his short novel "By Night In Tangier" (original title: Layl Tanja) in 2019.
