= Kockroach =

2007 novel by William Lashner, under the name "Tyler Knox"

- Author: Tyler Knox (pen name of William Lashner)
- Language: English
- Genre: Speculative fiction
- Publisher: William Morrow and Company/HarperCollins
- Publication place: United States
- Pages: 356
- ISBN: 0-06-114334-0
- OCLC: 70054389

Kockroach is a 2007 novel by William Lashner, written under the name "Tyler Knox". It was published by William Morrow and Company/HarperCollins. In 2008, an Italian translation, Lo strano caso dello scarafaggio che diventò uomo, was published by Newton Compton Editori, and a Portuguese translation, Kockroach: A Metamorfose, was published by Paralelo 40°.

== Synopsis ==
Kockroach is a re-imagining of Franz Kafka's 1915 novella the Metamorphosis: instead of having human Gregor Samsa wake up and find that he has been transformed into an enormous insect, Kockroach begins with a cockroach waking up in a hotel room in New York City in the mid-1950s, and finding that he has been transformed into a human. Since cockroaches are "awesome coping machines" which do not possess significant capacity for angst, despair, or introspection, "Jerry Blatta" (as he becomes known) quickly learns to walk on two legs instead of six, to recognize himself in a mirror, to dress and feed himself, to ward off predators by constantly showing his teeth, to play chess, and, Chauncey Gardiner-like, to fake his way through conversations. From there, he becomes a mob enforcer, then a mob boss, before venturing into politics.

== Reception ==
The Seattle Times described Kockroach as "Damon Runyon meets Kafka," while the San Francisco Chronicle compared it to Dashiell Hammett's Red Harvest. USA Today found the novel to be "inventively hilarious", and compared the voice of Blatta's companion Mickey "Mite" Pimelia to the dialogue of Raymond Chandler and James M. Cain, but faulted it for having Blatta gradually become more human in personality.

Kit Reed praised Lashner (as Knox)'s portrayal of the transformed cockroach, but criticized him for having anachronisms in the setting, saying that "(p)eriod details tend to slide around as though the author has done his homework, just not quite enough of it." The New York Times similarly observed the presence of anachronisms, and found that Mite's voice "sounds more like Bugs Bunny than Bugsy Siegel", assessing that the story "feels like the basis for a fine B movie rather than a novel".

== Potential sequel ==
Lashner has said that if he were to write a sequel, it would be modeled on Robert Caro's Master of the Senate.

== Film adaptation ==
In August 2025, a film adaptation was announced with Jonathan Ames writing and Matt Ross directing along with providing screenplay revisions. Andrew Lazar will produce through his Mad Chance production banner, while Black Bear Pictures handles international rights. Channing Tatum, Oscar Isaac, and Zazie Beetz were announced as the cast, with principal photography scheduled for January in Australia. In October 2025, Isaac was replaced by Taron Egerton due to a scheduling conflict, while shooting was pushed back to February. In February 2026, Tatum also departed due to scheduling conflicts and was replaced by Chris Hemsworth, with shooting further delayed to April. Alec Baldwin later joined at the end of March. Rachel Sennott joined a week before filming commenced. Hemsworth announced that filming had begun.
