= William Lashner =

American novelist and trial lawyer

- Born: 1956 (age 69–70)
- Education: New York University School of Law; Iowa Writers' Workshop
- Occupation: Novelist
- Writing career
- Pen name: Tyler Knox
- Website: www.williamlashner.com

William Lashner (born 1956) is an American novelist who formerly worked as a trial lawyer. He is a graduate of NYU School of Law and the Iowa Writers' Workshop at the University of Iowa. He has served as trial attorney in the Criminal Division of the United States Justice Department. He lives with his family outside of Philadelphia, Pennsylvania.

His novels include, Hostile Witness (1995); Bitter Truth (1997) aka Veritas; Fatal Flaw (2003); Past Due (2004); Falls the Shadow (2005); Marked Man (2007); Kockroach (as "Tyler Knox", 2007); A Killer's Kiss (2008); and Blood and Bone (2009).
