= The Metamorphosis =

1915 novella by Franz Kafka

- Cover of the first edition, illustrated by Ottomar Starke
- Author: Franz Kafka
- Original title: Die Verwandlung
- Language: German
- Genre: Existentialism, Absurdism, Fiction
- Publisher: Kurt Wolff Verlag, Leipzig
- Publication date: 1915
- Publication place: Germany
- Pages: 72
- Translation: The Metamorphosis at Wikisource

The Metamorphosis (German: Die Verwandlung, pronounced [dɪ fɛɐ̯ˈvantlʊŋ]), also translated as The Transformation, is a novella by Franz Kafka published in 1915. One of Kafka's best-known works, The Metamorphosis tells the story of salesman Gregor Samsa, who wakes to find himself inexplicably transformed into a huge insect (German: ungeheueres Ungeziefer, lit. 'monstrous vermin') and struggles to adjust to this condition, as does his family. The novella has been widely discussed among literary critics, who have offered varied interpretations. In popular culture and adaptations of the novella, the insect is commonly depicted as a cockroach.

At about 70 printed pages, it is the longest of the stories Kafka considered complete and published during his lifetime. It was first published in 1915 in the October issue of the journal Die weißen Blätter under the editorship of René Schickele. The first edition in book form appeared in December 1915 in the series Der jüngste Tag, edited by Kurt Wolff.

== Plot ==
Gregor Samsa wakes up one morning to find himself transformed into a "monstrous vermin". He initially considers the transformation to be temporary and slowly ponders the consequences of his metamorphosis. Stuck on his back and unable to get up and leave the bed, Gregor reflects on his job as a traveling salesman and cloth merchant, which he characterizes as being "plagued with ... the always changing, never enduring human exchanges that don't ever become intimate".

He sees his employer as a despot and would quickly quit his job if he were not his family's sole breadwinner and working off his bankrupt father's debts. While trying to move, Gregor finds that his office manager, the chief clerk, has shown up to check on him, indignant about Gregor's unexcused absence.

Gregor attempts to communicate with both the manager and his family, but all they can hear from behind the door is incomprehensible vocalizations. Gregor laboriously drags himself across the floor and opens the door. The clerk, upon seeing the transformed Gregor, flees the apartment. Gregor's family is horrified, and his father drives him back towards his room. Gregor is injured when he tries to force himself through the narrow doorway but gets unstuck when his father shoves him through.

With Gregor's unexpected transformation, his family is deprived of financial stability. They keep Gregor locked in his room, and he begins to accept his new identity and adapt to his new body. His sister Grete is the only one willing to bring him food, which she finds Gregor likes only if it is rotten. He spends much of his time crawling around on the floor, walls, and ceiling.

Upon discovering Gregor's new pastime, Grete decides to remove his furniture to give him more space. She and her mother begin to empty the room of everything, except the sofa under which Gregor hides whenever anyone comes in. He finds their actions deeply distressing, fearing that he might forget his past as a human, and desperately tries to save a particularly loved portrait on the wall of a woman clad in fur. His mother loses consciousness at the sight of him clinging to the image to protect it.

When Grete rushes out of the room to get some aromatic spirits, Gregor follows her and is slightly hurt when she drops a medicine bottle and it breaks. Their father returns home and angrily hurls apples at Gregor, one of which becomes lodged in his back, severely wounding him.

Gregor suffers from his injuries and eats very little. His father, mother, and sister all get jobs and increasingly begin to neglect him, and they use his room for storage. For a time, his family leaves Gregor's door open in the evenings so he can listen to them talk to each other, but this happens less frequently once they rent a room in the apartment to three male tenants, who are not told about Gregor.

One day, the charwoman, who briefly looks in on Gregor each day when she arrives and before she leaves, neglects to close his door fully. Attracted by Grete's violin-playing in the living room, Gregor crawls out and is spotted by the unsuspecting tenants, who complain about the apartment's unhygienic conditions and say they are leaving, will not pay anything for the time they have already stayed, and may take legal action.

Grete, who is tired of taking care of Gregor and realizes the burden his existence puts on each member of the family, tells her parents that the creature is no longer Gregor and they must get rid of "it" or they will all be ruined. Gregor, understanding that he is no longer wanted, laboriously makes his way back to his room and dies of starvation before sunrise. His body is discovered by the charwoman, who alerts his family and then disposes of the corpse.

The relieved and optimistic father, mother, and sister all take the day off work. They travel by tram into the countryside and make plans to move to a smaller apartment to save money. During the short trip, Mr. and Mrs. Samsa realize that, despite the hardships that have brought some paleness to her face, Grete has grown up into a pretty young lady with a good figure and they think about finding her a husband.

== Characters ==
=== Gregor Samsa ===
Gregor is the main character of the story. He works as a traveling salesman in order to provide money for his sister and parents, including paying off debt his father had accumulated. He wakes up one morning finding himself transformed into an insect. After the metamorphosis, Gregor becomes unable to work and is confined to his room for most of the remainder of the story. This prompts his family to begin working once again. Gregor is depicted as isolated from society and often both misunderstands the true intentions of others and is misunderstood.

=== Grete Samsa ===
Grete is Gregor's younger sister, and she becomes his caretaker after his metamorphosis. They initially have a close relationship, but this quickly fades. At first, she volunteers to feed him and clean his room, but she grows increasingly impatient with the burden and begins to leave his room in disarray out of spite. Her initial decision to take care of Gregor may have come from a desire to contribute and be useful to the family, since she becomes angry and upset when the mother cleans his room. It is made clear that Grete is disgusted by Gregor, as she always opens the window upon entering his room to keep from feeling nauseous and leaves without doing anything if Gregor is in plain sight. She plays the violin and dreams of going to the conservatory to study, a dream Gregor had intended to make happen; he had planned on making the announcement on Christmas Day. To help provide an income for the family after Gregor's transformation, she starts working as a salesgirl. Grete is also the first to suggest getting rid of Gregor, which causes Gregor to give up on life and die. At the end of the story, Grete's parents realize that she has become beautiful and full-figured and decide to consider finding her a husband.

=== Mr. Samsa ===
Mr. Samsa is Gregor's father. After the metamorphosis, he is forced to return to work in order to support the family financially. His attitude towards his son is harsh. He regards the transformed Gregor with disgust and possibly even fear and attacks Gregor on several occasions. Even when Gregor was human, Mr. Samsa regarded him mostly as a source of income for the family. Gregor's relationship with his father is modelled after Kafka's own relationship with his father. The theme of alienation becomes quite evident here.

=== Mrs. Samsa ===
Mrs. Samsa is Gregor's mother. She is portrayed as a submissive wife. She suffers from asthma, which is a constant source of concern for Gregor. She is initially shocked at Gregor's transformation, but she still wants to enter his room because she loves him. However, it proves too much for her and gives rise to a conflict between her maternal impulse and sympathy, on the one hand, and her fear and revulsion at Gregor's new form, on the other.

=== The Charwoman ===
The charwoman is an old widowed lady who is employed by the Samsa family after their previous maid begs to be dismissed on account of the fright she experiences owing to Gregor's new form. She is paid to take care of their household duties. Apart from Grete and her father, the charwoman is the only person who is in close contact with Gregor, and she is unafraid in her dealings with Gregor. She does not question his changed state; she seemingly accepts it as a normal part of his existence. She is the one who notices Gregor has died and disposes of his body.

== Interpretations ==
Like much of Kafka's work, The Metamorphosis tends to be given a religious (Max Brod) or psychological interpretation. It has been particularly common to read the story as an expression of Kafka's father complex, as was first done by Charles Neider in his The Frozen Sea: A Study of Franz Kafka (1948). Besides the psychological approach, interpretations focusing on sociological aspects, which see the Samsa family as representing a typical family of the time and place, have also gained a large following.

Vladimir Nabokov rejected such interpretations, noting that they do not live up to Kafka's art. He instead chose an interpretation guided by the artistic detail but excluded any symbolic or allegoric meanings. Arguing against the popular father-complex theory, he observed that it is the sister more than the father who should be considered the cruelest person in the story, since she is the one backstabbing Gregor. In Nabokov's view, the central narrative theme is the artist's struggle for existence in a society replete with narrow-minded people who destroy him step by step. Commenting on Kafka's style, he writes, "The transparency of his style underlines the dark richness of his fantasy world. Contrast and uniformity, style and the depicted, portrayal and fable are seamlessly intertwined".

In 1989, Nina Pelikan Straus wrote a feminist interpretation of The Metamorphosis, noting that the story is not only about the metamorphosis of Gregor but also about the metamorphosis of his family and, in particular, his younger sister Grete. Straus suggested that the social and psychoanalytic resonances of the text depend on Grete's role as a woman, daughter, and sister, and that prior interpretations failed to recognize Grete's centrality to the story.

In 1999, Gerhard Rieck pointed out that Gregor and his sister, Grete, form a pair, which is typical of many of Kafka's texts: it is made up of one passive, rather austere, person and another active, more libidinal, person. The appearance of figures with such almost irreconcilable personalities who form couples in Kafka's works has been evident since he wrote his short story "Description of a Struggle" (e.g. the narrator/young man and his "acquaintance"). They also appear in "The Judgment" (Georg and his friend in Russia), in all three of his novels (e.g. Robinson and Delamarche in Amerika) as well as in his short stories "A Country Doctor" (the country doctor and the groom) and "A Hunger Artist" (the hunger artist and the panther). Rieck views these pairs as parts of one single person (hence the similarity between the names Gregor and Grete) and in the final analysis as the two determining components of the author's personality. Not only in Kafka's life but also in his oeuvre does Rieck see the description of a fight between these two parts.

Reiner Stach argued in 2004 that no elucidating comments were needed to illustrate the story and that it was convincing by itself, self-contained, even absolute. He believes that there is no doubt the story would have been admitted to the canon of world literature even if we had known nothing about its author.

According to Peter-André Alt (2005), the figure of the insect becomes a drastic expression of Gregor Samsa's deprived existence. Reduced to carrying out his professional responsibilities, anxious to guarantee his advancement and vexed with the fear of making commercial mistakes, he is the creature of a functionalistic professional life.

In 2007, Ralf Sudau wrote that particular attention should be paid to the motifs of self-abnegation and disregard for reality. Gregor's earlier behavior was characterized by self-renunciation and his pride in being able to provide a secure and leisured existence for his family. When he finds himself in need of assistance and in danger of becoming a parasite, he does not want to admit this to himself and be disappointed by the treatment he receives from his family, which is becoming more and more careless and even hostile to him. According to Sudau, Gregor engages in self-denial by hiding his nauseating appearance under the sofa and gradually famishing, thereby complying with the more or less blatant wish of his family. His gradual emaciation and "self-reduction" shows signs of a fatal hunger strike (which on the part of Gregor is unconscious and unsuccessful, and on the part of his family not understood or ignored). Sudau also lists the names of selected interpreters of The Metamorphosis (e.g. Beicken, Sokel, Sautermeister and Schwarz) to whom the narrative is a metaphor for the suffering resulting from leprosy, an escape into the disease or a symptom onset, an image of an existence which is defaced by the career, or a revealing staging which cracks the veneer and superficiality of everyday circumstances and exposes its cruel essence. Sudau further notes that Kafka's representational style is on one hand characterized by an idiosyncratic interpenetration of realism and fantasy, a worldly mind, rationality, and clarity of observation, and on the other hand by folly, outlandishness, and fallacy. He also points to the grotesque and tragicomical, silent film-like elements.

Fernando Bermejo-Rubio (2012) argues that the story is often unjustly viewed as inconclusive. He reads the descriptions of Gregor and his family environment in The Metamorphosis to contradict each other. Diametrically opposed versions exist of Gregor's back, his voice, of whether he is ill or already undergoing the metamorphosis, whether he is dreaming or not, which treatment he deserves, of his moral point of view (false accusations made by Grete), and whether his family is blameless or not. Bermejo-Rubio emphasizes that Kafka ordered in 1915 that there should be no illustration of Gregor. He argues that it is exactly this absence of a visual narrator that is essential for Kafka's project, for he who depicts Gregor would stylize himself as an omniscient narrator. Another reason why Kafka opposed such an illustration is that the reader should not be biased in any way before reading. That the descriptions are not compatible with each other indicates that the opening statement is not to be trusted. If the reader is not hoodwinked by the first sentence and still thinks of Gregor as a human being, he will see that the story is conclusive and realize that Gregor is a victim of his own degeneration.

Volker Drüke (2013) believes that a crucial metamorphosis in the story is that of Grete, and the title of the story may be directed at her as well as Gregor. Gregor's metamorphosis is followed by his languishing and ultimately dying. Grete, by contrast, matures as a result of the new family circumstances and assumes responsibility. In the end – after the brother's death – the parents also notice that their daughter, "who was getting more animated all the time, ... had recently blossomed into a pretty and shapely girl", and they want to look for a partner for her. From this standpoint Grete's metamorphosis from a girl into a woman, is a subtextual theme of the story.

Allan Beveridge (2009) believes that the story shows the isolating effects of being different from others around you. He states that the story "shows how easy it is for carers and psychiatric staff to be unintentionally cruel to sufferers." The reaction of the family to Gregor's suffering can be viewed as a metaphor for the presence of a disabled individual in the family and the challenges that come along with it, not only to the individual but to the family itself.

== Translations of ungeheueren Ungeziefer in the opening sentence ==
The Metamorphosis has been translated into English more than twenty times. In Kafka's original, the opening sentence is "Als Gregor Samsa eines Morgens aus unruhigen Träumen erwachte, fand er sich in seinem Bett zu einem ungeheueren Ungeziefer verwandelt". In their 1933 translation of the story – the first into English – Willa Muir and Edwin Muir rendered it as "As Gregor Samsa awoke one morning from uneasy dreams he found himself transformed in his bed into a gigantic insect". In Middle High German, Ungeziefer literally means "unclean animal not suitable for sacrifice" and is sometimes used colloquially to mean "bug", with the connotation of "dirty, nasty bug". It can also be translated as "vermin".

In a note in his translation of the story, Mark Harman writes:

The compact phrase, "ungeheueres Ungeziefer, with its resonant double "un," defies translation and makes it hard to determine precisely what kind of creature Gregor has become. The possible meanings of ungeheuer—the opposite of geheuer (familiar)—range from "monstrous" to "huge." Etymologically complex, Ungeziefer could denote a number of small verminous creatures that can be either mammals or insects. While the indeterminacy of this term seems quite deliberate, Kafka is somewhat more precise in an April 1913 letter to Kurt Wolff in which he calls Gregor Samsa an "insect" (Insekt).

The phrase ungeheueren Ungeziefer, describing the creature into which Gregor Samsa transforms, has been translated in at least sixteen different ways. These include the following:

- "gigantic insect" (Willa and Edwin Muir, 1933)
- "some monstrous kind of vermin" (A. L. Lloyd, London: The Parton Press, 1937; New York: The Vanguard Press, as Metamorphosis, 1946)
- "monstrous vermin" (Stanley Corngold, 1972; Joachim Neugroschel, 1993; Donna Freed, 1996)
- "giant bug" (J. A. Underwood, 1981)
- "monstrous insect" (Malcolm Pasley, 1992; Karen Reppin, 1996; Richard Stokes, 2002; Katja Pelzer, 2017; Mark Harman, 2024)
- "enormous bug" (Stanley Appelbaum, 1996)
- "gargantuan pest" (M. A. Roberts, 2005; revised 2008)
- "monstrous cockroach" (Michael Hofmann, 2007)
- "monstrous verminous bug" (Ian Johnston, 2007)
- "a vile insect, one of gigantic proportions" (Philip Lundberg, 2007)
- "some kind of monstrous vermin" (Joyce Crick, 2009)
- "horrible vermin" (David Wyllie, 2011; Karen Reppin, 2023)
- "some sort of monstrous insect" (Susan Bernofsky, 2014)
- "some kind of monstrous bedbug" (Christopher Moncrieff, 2014)
- "huge verminous insect" (John R. Williams, 2014)
- "a kind of giant bug" (William Aaltonen, 2023)

What kind of bug or vermin Kafka envisaged remains a debated mystery. Kafka had no intention of labeling Gregor as any specific thing, but instead was trying to convey Gregor's disgust at his transformation. In his letter to his publisher of 25 October 1915, in which he discusses his concern about the cover illustration for the first edition, Kafka does use the term Insekt, though, saying "The insect itself is not to be drawn. It is not even to be seen from a distance." Indeed, a "conspicuous lack of naming is a characteristic of Kafka's writing, and its aim is arguably far more ingenious than to inspire readers to speculate on species classification.... To seek to locate the animal in the encyclopedia is, in many ways, antithetical to the way Kafka's stories are constructed and incorporate ambiguity."

Vladimir Nabokov, who was a lepidopterist as well as a writer and literary critic, concluded from details in the text that Gregor was not a cockroach, but a beetle with wings under his shell, and capable of flight. Nabokov left a sketch annotated "just over three feet long" on the opening page of his English teaching copy. In his accompanying lecture notes, he discusses the type of insect Gregor has been transformed into. Noting that the cleaning lady addressed Gregor as "dung beetle" (Mistkäfer), e.g., "Come here for a bit, old dung beetle!" or "Hey, look at the old dung beetle!", Nabokov remarks that this was just her friendly way of addressing him, and that Gregor "is not, technically, a dung beetle. He is merely a big beetle."

== Translations of other passages ==
Paul Reitter, a professor of German Languages and Literature, compares three translations of a passage early in the novella, after Gregor awakes and wonders why he did not hear his alarm clock: the Muirs', Susan Bernofsky's, and Mark Harman's.

== Translation of the title ==
The Translation Website states:

The German title, Die Verwandlung, can be translated as either The Transformation or The Metamorphosis. The most frequent choice is metamorphosis, but this word has the disadvantage of being more "literary" and less commonly used in English than verwandlung is in German. The appearance of this word in the title perhaps too quickly alerts the reader to the strangeness of the story to follow; it doesn't really fit with the much more "ordinary" tone in which the story is narrated. Another problem is that those readers familiar with the word may know it primarily as a biological term referring to a caterpillar's transformation into a butterfly, not at all the type of transformation that the story describes. But despite these disadvantages, most contemporary translations use The Metamorphosis as the title of the story — mainly because it's the title that was most often used in earlier translations and therefore the one most familiar to English-language readers.

Mark Harman explains why he chose the title The Transformation for his translation of the story:

Although that story is commonly known as "The Metamorphosis," Kafka, who had as a schoolboy not only read Ovid's Metamorphoses, that classic tale of "forms changed into new bodies," but also translated a portion of it from the Latin, could have entitled his story Die Metamorphose, but he did not do so. His decision to call the story "Die Verwandlung" certainly deserves to be respected in translation....

Although M. A. Roberts titled his 2005 translation The Metamorphosis, he notes that "Kafka's title actually translates as The Transformation".

In the afterword to her translation, Susan Bernofsky defends her choice of The Metamorphosis for the title:

Unlike the English "metamorphosis," the German word Verwandlung does not suggest a natural change of state associated with the animal kingdom such as the change from a caterpillar to a butterfly. Instead, it is a word from fairytales used to describe the transformation, say, of a girl's seven brothers into swans. But the word "metamorphosis" refers to this, too; its first definition in the Oxford English Dictionary is "The action or process of changing in form, shape, or substance; esp. transformation by supernatural means." This is the sense in which it's used, for instance, in translations of Ovid. As a title for this rich, complex story, it strikes me as the most luminous, suggestive choice.
