= Riot in Ephesus =

Event in the New Testament

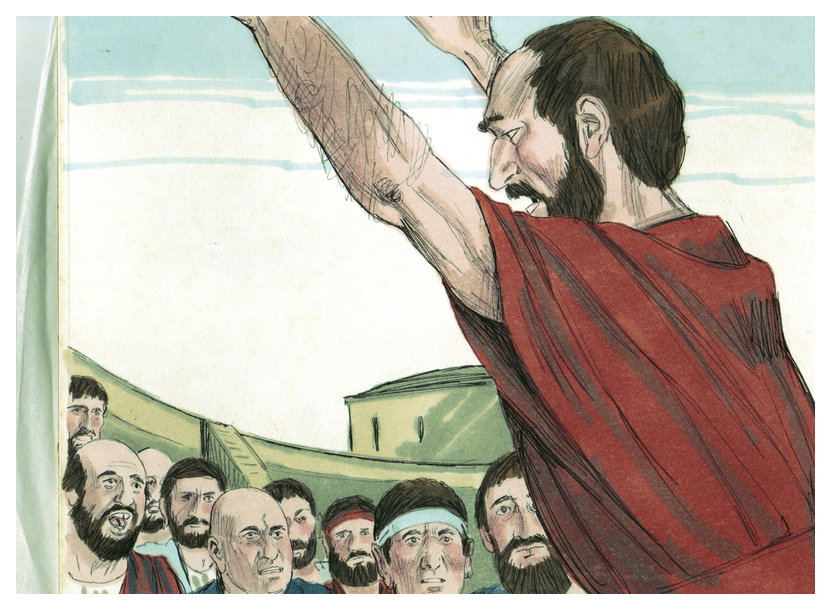
Illustration of the crowd at the theater in Ephesus, from the Sweet Publishing Bible illustrations

The riot of the Ephesian silversmiths (also called the riot at Ephesus) is a civic disturbance described in the Acts of the Apostles (19:23-41). It took place in Ephesus in the mid-50s AD in response to the preaching of Paul the Apostle. A silversmith named Demetrius incited his fellow craftsmen, arguing that Paul's teaching that handmade objects are not divine threatened both their livelihood and the honor of the goddess Artemis and her famous temple. The crowd surged to the city theater, chanting "Great is Artemis of the Ephesians" and seizing two of Paul's companions; a Jewish figure named Alexander failed to address the assembly when the crowd drowned him out with chants; and the unrest was ultimately defused by the town clerk, who affirmed Ephesus's status as guardian of Artemis, declared the followers of Christ innocent of any offense, and warned that the disorder risked attracting a charge of sedition from the Roman authorities.

Several details of the account align with independently attested features of Ephesus during the first century AD, the theater's role as the citizen assembly's meeting place, the town clerk's prominence in civic life, and an inscription confirming the existence of a silversmiths' guild, though no shrines of the kind attributed to Demetrius have been discovered. Scholars compare this episode to other guild-driven civic unrest in Asia Minor and to Josephus's account of anti-Jewish mob violence in Antioch.

Scholars have analyzed the episode from different angles. Robert F. Stoops interprets the episode as an apologetic argument in which the author, traditionally identified as Luke the Evangelist, presents Christians as passive victims of disorder while their opponents bear responsibility for the breach of public order, an approach historically used by Jewish diaspora communities to defend their civic privileges before Roman authorities in the face of violence or hostility. C. L. Brinks identifies an implicit theological contest between Artemis and the Christian God, structured around a series of contrasts that subtly favor the latter without claiming victory. Jeffrey M. Tripp, meanwhile, argues that the episode forms a rhetorical structural comparison (synkrisis) with a later temple riot in Jerusalem, the two scenes mirroring each other so closely in sequence, vocabulary, and theme that their juxtaposition carries both a political argument about civic order and a theological one about the fate of communities that reject Paul's message.

== Narrative ==
=== Background ===
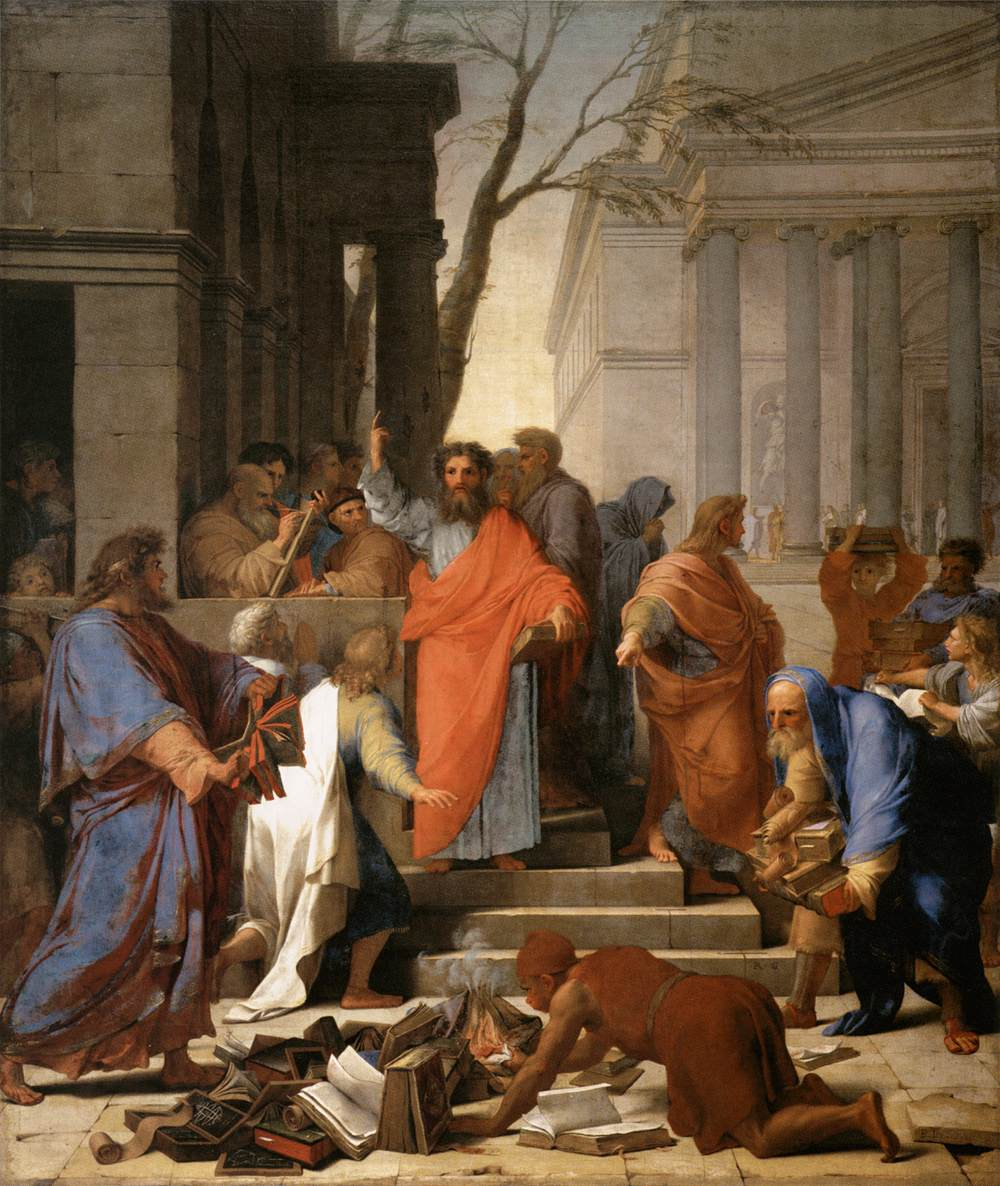
The Preaching of Saint Paul at Ephesus, Eustache Le Sueur, 1649

The riot is narrated in the Acts of the Apostles, (Note: The author gave the work no title; later church writers called it "Acts" (meaning "deeds").) a New Testament book dating from the late 1st century CE that chronicles the early church and the journeys of its leaders, including the Apostle Paul. Traditionally attributed to Luke, Acts forms the second volume of a single work alongside the Gospel of Luke, collectively known as Luke–Acts. Paul, a Jew from Tarsus who had initially persecuted the early Christian community, became one of its foremost missionaries after a conversion experience near Damascus. First preaching in Jewish synagogues, Paul turned to Gentiles after meeting opposition; his mission succeeded in founding Gentile Christian communities across the Eastern Mediterranean.

According to Acts, the riot occurred in Ephesus during Paul's third missionary expedition (c. 54–57 CE), near the end of his multi-year stay there. Ephesus was then part of the Roman province of Asia, in what is today western Turkey. By that point, Paul had spent three months debating in the local synagogue about the "Kingdom of God", followed by two further years of preaching, which Acts credits with bringing "the word of the Lord" to all residents of the province, Jews and Greeks alike. Paul had already decided to depart for Macedonia and Achaia before the disturbance broke out.

=== Verses 23–27 ===
23 And about that time there arose a great commotion about the Way. 24 For a certain man named Demetrius, a silversmith, who made silver shrines of Diana, brought no small profit to the craftsmen. 25 He called them together with the workers of similar occupation, and said: "Men, you know that we have our prosperity by this trade. 26 Moreover you see and hear that not only at Ephesus, but throughout almost all Asia, this Paul has persuaded and turned away many people, saying that they are not gods which are made with hands. 27 So not only is this trade of ours in danger of falling into disrepute, but also the temple of the great goddess Diana may be despised and her magnificence destroyed, whom all Asia and the world worship."

The episode is set in motion by a silversmith named Demetrius, who made small silver "shrines" of the goddess Artemis (sometimes translated as Diana, following the equivalent Roman deity). He convened his fellow craftsmen to warn that Paul's teaching, that man-made objects are not gods, had won over large numbers of people, threatening both the guild's livelihood and the goddess's honor.

Illustration of Demetrius the silversmith making silver shrines of Artemis, from the Sweet Publishing Bible illustrations

The precise nature of the "shrines" (originally Ancient Greek: ναούς, romanized: naous, the accusative plural form of ναός, naos) remains uncertain. Biblical scholar C. K. Barrett understood the word naos to refer to a temple or its innermost sanctuary, suggesting the objects were most likely miniature portable replicas of the temple intended for use in cultic processions. Theologian C. L. Brinks suggests that, since Ephesus drew many visitors, especially during festivals, such shrines would plausibly have sold as souvenirs. While silver statuettes of Artemis and terracotta replicas of her enshrined in a niche have been found, no silver representations of the Ephesian temple itself have come to light, and the practice of manufacturing such objects was apparently unknown even to the 4th-century bishop John Chrysostom. One alternative proposed is that the Greek phrase naous poiein ("making shrines") was a textual corruption of neopoious, the term for officials who supervised the upkeep of the Artemis temple, though as Barrett notes, the sole basis for this conjecture is the absence of evidence for the custom itself.

The title neokoros for Ephesus, pointing to its responsibility as the guardian of Artemis's temple, is attested in inscriptions and on coins. An Ephesian inscription related to local funerary practices and referring to "the association of silversmiths" (to syndérion tōn argyrokópōn) confirms the existence of such a guild in the city.

=== Verses 28–29 ===
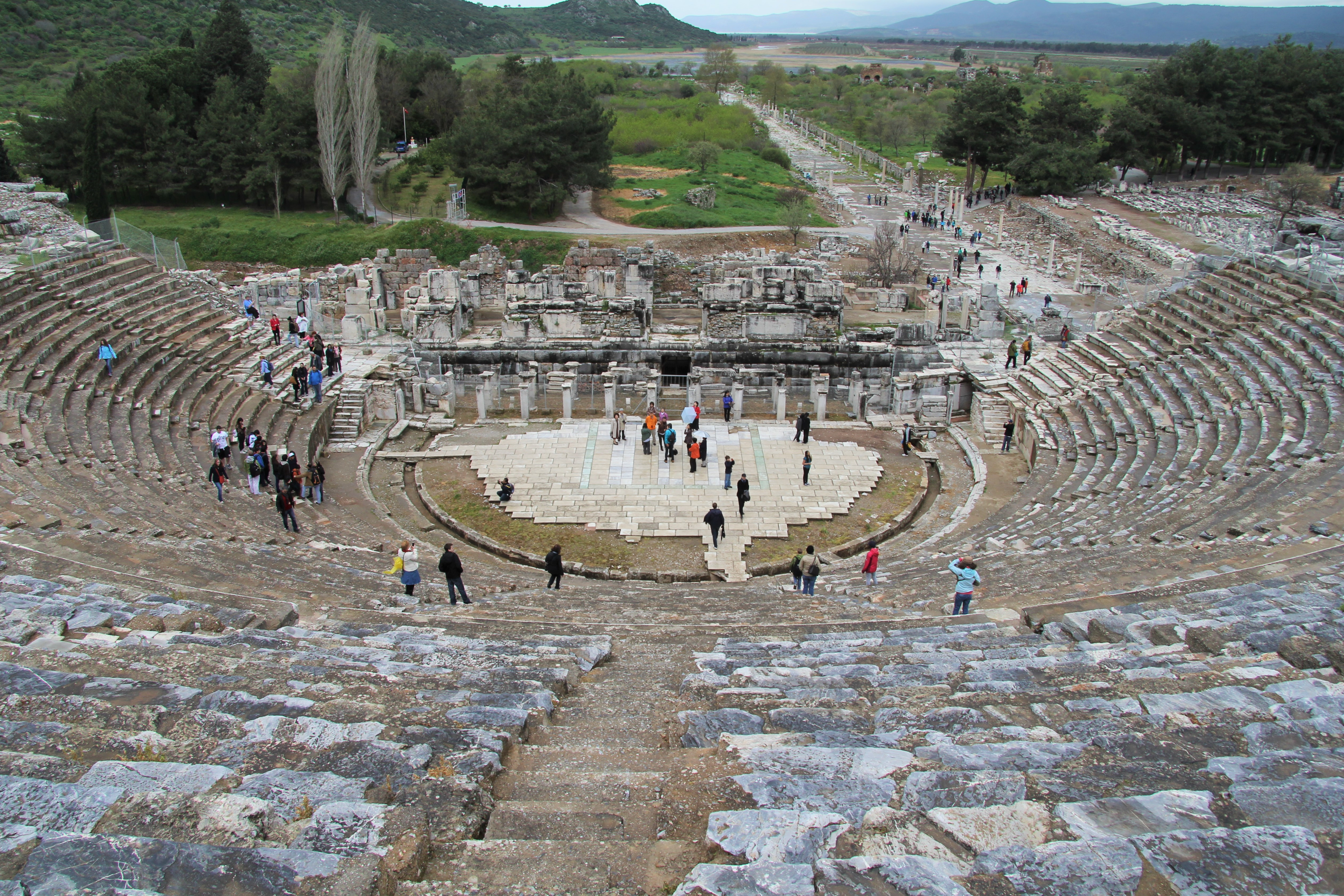
Ephesus theater

28 Now when they heard this, they were full of wrath and cried out, saying, "Great is Diana of the Ephesians!" 29 So the whole city was filled with confusion, and rushed into the theater with one accord, having seized Gaius and Aristarchus, Macedonians, Paul's travel companions.

The artisans responded with cries in praise of Artemis, and a crowd surged toward the city theater, seizing and dragging along two of Paul's Macedonian companions, Gaius and Aristarchus. The theater was both a venue for entertainment and the regular meeting place of the citizen assembly (ekklesia), and it was a setting in which status disputes between communities could be contested. Built into a hillside, it is known to have had a capacity of at least 24,000 people.

=== Verses 30–34 ===
30 And when Paul wanted to go in to the people, the disciples would not allow him. 31 Then some of the officials of Asia, who were his friends, sent to him pleading that he would not venture into the theater. 32 Some therefore cried one thing and some another, for the assembly was confused, and most of them did not know why they had come together. 33 And they drew Alexander out of the multitude, the Jews putting him forward. And Alexander motioned with his hand, and wanted to make his defense to the people. 34 But when they found out that he was a Jew, all with one voice cried out for about two hours, "Great is Diana of the Ephesians!"

Paul attempted to enter the theater and address the crowd but was restrained by his own followers and by several Asiarchs, i.e., officials connected either to the provincial League of Asia (a federation of the province's cities that ran the imperial cult and festivals) or, alternatively, priests responsible for the imperial cult of Roma and Augustus in the province. They are described as friendly to him. The local Jewish community put forward a man named Alexander to speak in their defense, but the crowd, upon recognizing him as Jewish, drowned him out with two hours of chants of "Great is Artemis of the Ephesians!"

Barrett offered the explanation that the Jews may have put Alexander forward because they were not always differentiated from the Christians who had provoked the crowd, or because Jews were known to oppose idolatry. Biblical scholar Joseph Fitzmyer offered a similar reading, proposing that the Jewish community may have wanted Alexander to clarify for the crowd that they and the Christians were distinct groups.

=== Verses 35–41 ===
35 And when the city clerk had quieted the crowd, he said: "Men of Ephesus, what man is there who does not know that the city of the Ephesians is temple guardian of the great goddess Diana, and of the image which fell down from Zeus? 36 Therefore, since these things cannot be denied, you ought to be quiet and do nothing rashly. 37 For you have brought these men here who are neither robbers of temples nor blasphemers of your goddess. 38 Therefore, if Demetrius and his fellow craftsmen have a case against anyone, the courts are open and there are proconsuls. Let them bring charges against one another. 39 But if you have any other inquiry to make, it shall be determined in the lawful assembly. 40 For we are in danger of being called in question for today's uproar, there being no reason which we may give to account for this disorderly gathering." 41 And when he had said these things, he dismissed the assembly.

The situation was resolved after the town clerk (grammateus), one of the city's most senior civic officials, took the floor. The position was among the most prominent in Ephesus, significant enough that the officeholder's name was used to date official documents found in the city. He began by reassuring the crowd that the standing of Ephesus as the guardian of Artemis and of her image, which is claimed to have come from heaven rather than from human manufacture, is beyond any doubt. He then declared that the men who have been seized are guilty of neither temple robbery nor blasphemy against the goddess, since her image was diopetēs, that is, fallen from heaven. He added that legal channels exist for anyone with a legitimate complaint and that the crowd's disorderly conduct risks attracting a Roman charge of sedition, a serious matter for a city that prized its autonomous institutions.

The reference to the diopetēs is, according to Fitzmyer, the only reference "in Greek literature to a legend that a statue of Ephesian Artemis fell from the heaven". (Note: However, Euripides, the 5th century BC Athenian playwright, "alludes to a similar legend about Taurian Artemis"; Fitzmyer added that the image is "usually explained as an archaic statue made from a meteoric stone".) Barrett suggests the object was "probably some form of meteorite, perhaps having human form."

Barrett observed that the town clerk's declaration, while effective in defusing the situation, stretched the truth; under different circumstances the same official could readily have accused Paul of both charges, but his immediate goal was to restore order, and a case could plausibly made that Paul's overriding purpose was to preach his own message rather than to "discredit a rival". Regarding the legal framework mentioned by the town clerk, Barrett noted that the citizen assembly is attested to have met three times a month, or alternatively, once a month, so Demetrius would not have had to wait long for a legal hearing. Fitzmyer specified that the town clerk's warning about sedition would have invoked Roman laws such as the Lex Lutatia, the Lex Plautia, and possibly the Lex Julia de vi publica.

== Textual variants ==
Codex Bezae, a bi-lingual Greek and Latin manuscript of the New Testament, features multiple textual variants. At verse 28, Codex D adds that the crowd ran "into the intersection" (streets at right angles) before continuing their chants. At verse 29, Codex D reads a different word for the confusion that could mean "the city was confused with disgrace". At verse 32, the same codex uses a different word for "majority" that could also mean "the best people", even the prominent citizens did not understand what was happening.

== Comparable episodes ==
Parallels from civic unrest elsewhere in Asia Minor support the account's plausibility. A second-century proconsular edict from the nearby city of Magnesia records a riot provoked by a guild of bakers, while using words for disturbance, tumult and sedition that closely resemble the vocabulary of Acts 19. A first-century text by Greek orator and writer Dio Chrysostom, referring to unrest among linen workers in Tarsus, also uses comparable language.

Other parallels for the Ephesian riot can be found in The Jewish War by Josephus, in Book 7. One such narrative (7.3.2–4) recounts mob violence in Antioch sparked by a false accusation that Jews had set fire to the city, leading to a frenzied attack. A second account (7.5.2) describes how, following the Roman suppression of the First Jewish Revolt, the people of Antioch petitioned Roman general and future emperor Titus to expel the city's Jews and, when he refused, to revoke their privileges; New Testament scholar Robert F. Stoops notes that these accounts contain parallels to "almost every element" of the Ephesian riot narrative. Whether the author of Acts modeled his account on a single such report, drew on a general familiarity with similar incidents, or worked from an Ephesian tradition cannot be determined with certainty.

Fitzmyer and Barrett both drew a parallel between Demetrius's complaint and the report sent around 110 AD by Pliny the Younger, the Roman governor of Bithynia and Pontus, to Emperor Trajan concerning the impact of Christianity on the pagan cults of Asia Minor. Pliny described temples that had been almost deserted beginning to be thronged again once Christianity was repressed.

== Scholarly analysis ==
Archaeologist and New Testament scholar William Mitchell Ramsay regards the narrative as mostly authentic, describing it as "the most instructive picture of society in an Asian city at this period." He interprets the event as a mixed anti-Jewish and anti-Christian disturbance, with Alexander attempting to deflect blame from the Jews, and suggests identifying him with the metalworker of the same name mentioned by Paul in 2 Timothy 4:14, who is described as having caused Paul harm. For Ramsay, the narrative has a "tone of sarcasm and contempt" toward the crowd. He argues that the town clerk’s speech was an invention of the author, traditionally identified as Luke, shaped by an apologetic agenda and following the Thucydidean tradition of composing speeches for literary purposes. In later work, he still regards the rest of the account as an eyewitness report.

=== As a reworked account of an anti-Jewish riot ===
Two early interpreters read the narrative as a reworked account of anti-Jewish rather than anti-Christian hostility. Theologian and orientalist Julius Wellhausen, noting the otherwise puzzling appearance of Alexander, argues that the episode originally described a riot targeting Jews in Ephesus and was subsequently rewritten to center on Christians; in his reading, this revision produced what he considered an artificial connection to Paul. He attributed its placement in Acts to the shared Ephesian setting without proposing a specific narrative rationale.

Biblical scholar Alfred Loisy developed this hypothesis, locating the original concern in Jewish proselytism and treating the references to Paul's companions and the town clerk's speech as later additions. For Loisy, the episode served Luke as a way of filling in the Ephesian hardships Paul alludes to in 1 Corinthians 15:32 and 2 Corinthians 11:23–26. In his view, the narrative also implied that authorities had no legitimate basis for intervening in the affairs of either Jews or Christians, as the two were fundamentally kindred.

Theologian Hans Conzelmann proposed that Luke worked from only a thin strand of source material, set the story against a background of pagan anti-Jewish sentiment, and linked it to Paul primarily to praise the reach of Paul's missionary effort. However, while acknowledging Luke's compositional freedom, Conzelmann considered the story to be based on actual events rather than invented from nothing. Fitzmyer also rejected the idea that the account is a Lukan fabrication, asking why Luke would want to invent such an account from nothing. Barrett suggested that Luke "may have heard it [the story] told in Ephesus or by Ephesian Christians elsewhere".

Other scholars challenged, or refined, these positions. Theologian Gottfried Schille assigned the original story to Paul's companions rather than to Paul himself, while theologian Johannes Munck treated the Alexander material as a fragment displaced from some other context entirely. Theologian Eckhard Plümacher, while agreeing that the passage was not originally placed at the same place, maintained that it always concerned Paul and was designed to illustrate the momentum of the mission by depicting its success as a tangible threat to the Artemis cult; in this reading the Jewish characters were simply inherited from Luke's source without further function. Theologian Ernst Haenchen rejected the hypothesis of an anti-Jewish source, noting that the Jews in the story suffer no harm and are only prevented from speaking. Pointing to a lack of consistency in the story, he ruled out eyewitness testimony, leaving Luke as the author of a scene more disorderly than anything that could plausibly have occurred.

=== As an argument for toleration ===
Robert F. Stoops argues that the narrative is best understood against the background of an apologetic tradition developed by Jewish diaspora communities in the Greek cities of the eastern Mediterranean. In these cities, Jewish residents occupied an intermediate legal status above ordinary foreigners but below full citizens, enjoying specific privileges, including the right to hold communal assemblies and funds, observe dietary and Shabbat laws, and adjudicate internal disputes, that set them apart from other non-citizen groups and provoked resentment from the local Greek population. When that resentment erupted into mob violence, Jewish communities appealed to Roman authorities, and could generally expect their privileges reaffirmed if they demonstrated that their opponents had initiated the disorder — a pattern of argument found in both Philo and Josephus, and one Roman officials appear to have accepted: in his letter to Alexandria, Roman Emperor Claudius (r. 41–54 AD) warned both communities against future aggression while leaving each community's existing privileges intact. Stoops contends that the Acts narrative reproduces this same apologetic logic, casting the Christians in the role diaspora Jews had learned to occupy.

Stoops argues that Luke's adoption of this Jewish apologetic framework was a natural move, given that neither the author of Acts nor the broader public clearly distinguished Christians from Jews during this period. The narrative is carefully constructed so that blame for the disorder falls entirely on the opponents of "The Way" (ἡ ὁδός, hē hodos, the group's self-appellation), while Paul and his associates appear as passive victims of the chaos. The Asiarchs, who were connected to the very apparatus through which edicts protecting Jewish rights were disseminated, are depicted as friendly to Paul. The silencing of Alexander solely because the crowd identifies him as a Jew, links the episode directly to the pattern of anti-Jewish hostility in Greek cities, defining the social world against which the story is meant to be read.

The town clerk's speech brings the apologetic to its conclusion. By rebuking the crowd as an illegitimate assembly while saying nothing against the Christian ekklesia (congregation), he implicitly distinguishes the mob convened by Demetrius from the orderly gathering of believers, suggesting the latter can coexist peacefully with the city's lawful institutions. The underlying claim is that Christian communities deserve the same autonomy long enjoyed by Jewish politeumata (self-governing communities of resident foreigners) in the Roman world. Stoops argues, however, that this apologetic was aimed not at Roman officials (for whom it would have been too subtle and indirect to function as a legal brief), but at Christian readers who needed both reassurance that their social position was defensible and arguments they could deploy against suspicious or hostile neighbors.

=== As a theological contest between Artemis and the Christian God ===
Brinks reads the episode as, above all, an implicit comparison between Artemis and the Christian God. He points to a textual parallel: Demetrius describes Artemis as the goddess whom "all Asia and the world" worship (19:27), while the author had already reported that "all the residents of Asia" heard the word of the Lord (19:10). Demetrius himself admits that Paul's preaching has spread through Asia and won over large numbers (19:26), and he fears the goddess may be stripped of her majesty (19:27). On Brinks's reading, the story thereby implies that even Artemis's own devotees believed a mightier god now threatened her. Read together, these verses stage what Brinks calls "a competition for followers"; Brinks argues that the episode promotes the idea that worship belongs to Paul's God rather than to Artemis "in Ephesus, in Asia, and in the whole world".

Brinks traces this rivalry through a series of contrasts. Demetrius is moved mainly by fear of his trade; Paul, presented elsewhere in Acts as self-supporting through manual labor and willing to risk his safety for his convictions. He is ready to face the mob and has to be talked out of entering the theater. The crowd, meanwhile, is reduced to an unruly mob, most of whom do not know why they have assembled. The town clerk rebukes the crowd for conduct that could bring a charge of rioting against the city; he adds that Paul and his companions are neither temple robbers nor blasphemers. That the crowd's hostility extends to Jews as well as Christians is, for Brinks, explainable by the fact that Demetrius's summary of Paul's message, that handmade objects are not divine, was not distinctively Christian; it was equally a Jewish position, making the two groups "virtually indistinguishable" in the eyes of the goddess's worshippers on this point.

Brinks notes that omitting Artemis from an account of Paul's years in a city defined by her worship would have been a conspicuous gap for any ancient reader. Yet the narrative makes no claim to an immediate Christian victory. Citing Scott Shauf, Brinks observes that the Artemis cult continued to flourish in Ephesus into the third century, and that Demetrius's fears do not match the situation in Ephesus for more than a century after Paul's stay. God emerges as a worthy challenger to Artemis, but the ending is left open. Ironically, Brinks writes, "as history turned out, Luke did have it right": in the end, Christianity emerged victorious. About two centuries after Paul's stay, the Temple of Artemis was plundered and burned by the Goths, and its site remained buried for roughly fifteen hundred years. Excavations later turned up statues of the goddess that had been defaced or engraved with crosses.

=== Synkrisis with the Jerusalem temple riot ===
Scholar of early Christianity, Jeffrey M. Tripp, has identified a structural comparison between the riot in Ephesus and a later episode centered on the Jewish Temple in Jerusalem (Acts 21:27–23:22). In Greek rhetorical theory, a structural comparison, or synkrisis in Greek, is a device that sets similar subjects alongside each other to highlight their differences or argue for one's superiority. By narrating two temple-centered riots in rapid succession, filled with closely matching elements, the author constructs an implicit comparison between the two cities through the disorder generated by their respective cults.

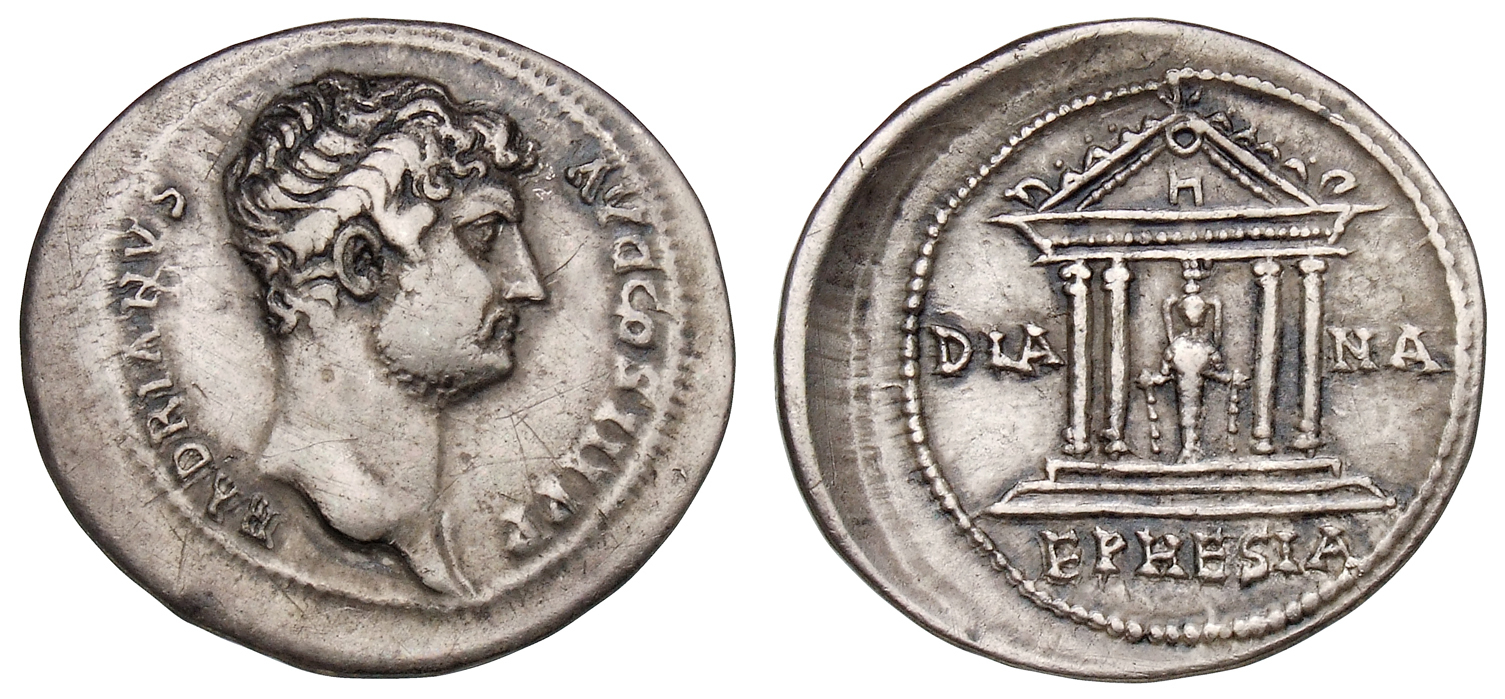
Hadrianic coin depicting the Temple of Artemis (c. 128–130 AD)

Tripp identifies fourteen shared narrative components, most appearing in similar sequence across the two scenes: paired accusations against Paul, civic confusion, a crowd rushing together, the seizure of Paul or his associates, intervention by authorities, a formulaic description of the crowd's incoherence, an attempted defense speech, a second hostile outcry, and references to both factional strife and organized conspiracy. The verbal parallels reinforce the structural ones: several key terms linking the two passages are rare or unique within the New Testament, most strikingly the noun synchysis ("confusion") and the related verb syncheō, which appear in both episodes and nowhere else in the text, as does the distinctive pattern used to describe the crowd's incoherence.

Tripp argues that the comparison is prepared by Acts 7, the last major temple episode before Paul's arrival in Jerusalem. There, Saint Stephen declares that God does not dwell in structures made by human hands (7:48) and draws a parallel between Solomon's Temple—the first Temple in Jerusalem—and the Golden Calf, a cult image built by the Israelites during the Mount Sinai revelation, treating both as instances of misdirected worship.

According to Tripp, the two scenes both carry a political and theological argument, each shaped by the circumstances of the text's composition following the destruction of the Second Temple in 70 AD. At the political level, both scenes imply that responding to the Christian message with mob violence in defense of a temple is disorderly and contrary to Roman interests. At the theological level, the juxtaposition may suggest that God permits even the divine temple to be destroyed when its defenders reject the messengers God has sent. The contrast is pointed: Ephesus submits to civic order and legal process, and its temple stands; Jerusalem descends into chaos, challenges Roman authority, and sees its temple razed; nevertheless, for Tripp, Acts "does not argue against Judaism or Jews as such, but against a particular way of worshipping God as no longer appropriate or desirable".

== Relationship to 1 Corinthians 15:32 ==
Paul's remark in 1 Corinthians 15:32 that he "fought with wild beasts at Ephesus" has been linked to the riot narrative. A literal reading of this passage is often rejected: Roman citizenship, which Acts attributes to Paul, would have precluded a sentence to the arena, in any case he could not have survived such an encounter. The phrase is therefore taken as figurative— consistent with the Hebrew Bible's use of animal imagery for dangerous human enemies and with Paul's own reference to opponents as "dogs" in Philippians 3:2. Since the verb appears in the aorist form, the text clearly points to a past event rather than a habitual condition, and since Paul was writing from Ephesus (1 Corinthians 16:8), the incident is located in that city.

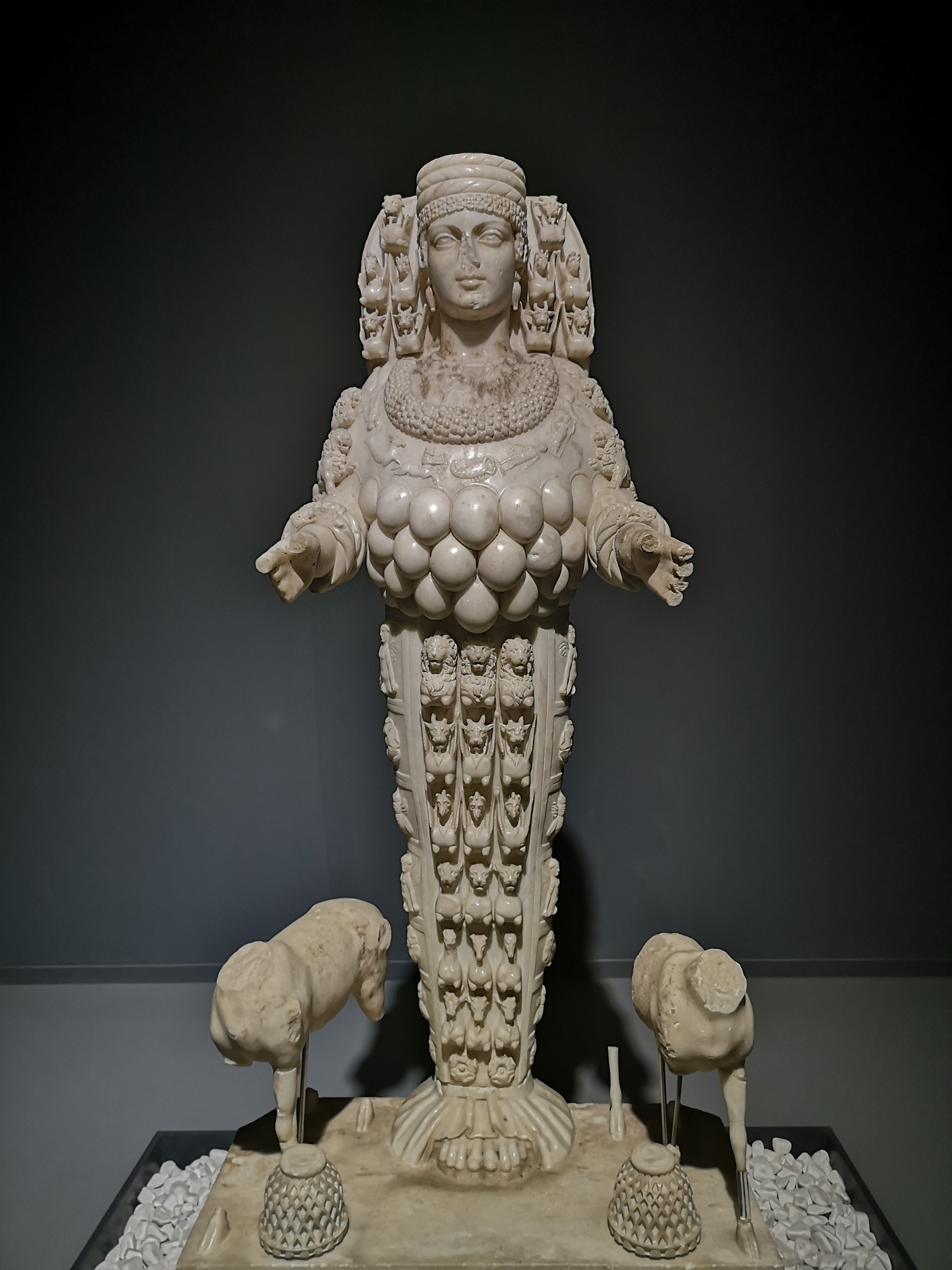
A statue of the Ephesian Artemis, first century AD, Ephesus Archaeological Museum

Theologian Morna D. Hooker identified the theater confrontation during the Ephesian riot as the most plausible referent, and indeed the riot narrative as a whole was among the passages Loisy had in mind when arguing that Luke constructed the episode to account for hardships Paul alludes to but never describes. Two obstacles complicate the identification, however. First, Acts explicitly places Paul away from the theater, restrained by his associates and the Asiarchs — meaning he never directly confronted the crowd. Second, if Paul departed Ephesus shortly after the riot, there would have been insufficient time for 1 Corinthians to have been written before the disturbance it apparently refers to. It has been suggested that Luke may have had reasons to downplay Paul's direct involvement: a failed confrontation ending in flight would have ill served his literary purposes.

Hooker further suggested that the beast metaphor would have carried particular resonance in an Ephesian context, given Artemis's role as mistress of animals. Her mythology and iconography, most famously the type in which her garments are covered with lions, bulls, griffins, and other creatures — emphasized her dominion over the animal world. The conventional Jewish metaphor of enemies as beasts would acquire heightened resonance when the enemies in question were followers of a goddess defined by her mastery of beasts. Hooker also raised the possibility that the theater riot was not an isolated incident but the culmination of sustained conflict with Artemis's devotees. Since Paul's letters document far more dangers than Luke records (2 Corinthians 11:23–27), it is plausible that serious opposition from that quarter preceded the episode Luke narrates. Writing from Ephesus to the Corinthians, Paul characterizes his situation as one of great opportunity accompanied by "many opponents" (1 Corinthians 16:9), suggesting that friction with the city's dominant religious establishment was a running feature of his ministry there.

Fitzmyer argues that the riot episode as Luke narrates it cannot be identified with the experiences Paul describes in 1 Corinthians 15:32 or 2 Corinthians 8:10. He wrote that in Luke's version, Paul's disciples and the Asiarchs keep him away from the theater, so he never actually faces danger. Whatever real experiences lie behind Paul's language of fighting beasts and mortal affliction in Asia, they belong to a part of Paul's residence in Ephesus that Luke either did not know about or chose not to include. Barrett was more cautious, leaving open the possibility of a connection between the Ephesian riot and the experiences alluded to by Paul.

== See also ==
- Book burning at Ephesus
- Saint Stephen
- Asiatic Vespers
- Early centers of Christianity in Anatolia

== Bibliography ==
=== Sources ===
- Barrett, Charles K. (2002). Acts of the Apostles: A Shorter Commentary. London: T&T Clark. ISBN 978-0567088178.
- Brinks, C. L. (2009). ""Great Is Artemis of the Ephesians": Acts 19: 23-41 in Light of Goddess Worship in Ephesus". The Catholic Biblical Quarterly. 71 (4). Catholic Biblical Association: 776–794. eISSN 2163-2529. JSTOR 43726616.
- Brown, Raymond E. (2016) [1997]. Soards, Marion L. (ed.). An Introduction to the New Testament. Anchor Yale Bible Reference Library (Abridged ed.). New Haven and London: Yale University Press. ISBN 978-030017312-3.
- Fitzmyer, Joseph A. (1998). The Acts of the Apostles. Anchor Yale Bible Commentaries. New Haven: Yale University Press. ISBN 978-0300139822.
- Haenchen, Ernst (1971). The Acts of the Apostles: A Commentary. Oxford: Blackwell. ISBN 978-0664209193.
- Hooker, Morna D. (2013). "Artemis of Ephesus". The Journal of Theological Studies. 64 (1): 37–46. doi:10.1093/jts/fls174. eISSN 1477-4607.
- Loisy, Alfred (1920). Les Actes des Apôtres. Paris: Nourry. pp. 744, 752–753, 756. OCLC 1972115.
- Munck, Johannes (1967). The Acts of the Apostles: Introduction, Translation, and Notes. Anchor Bible. Vol. 31. Garden City, NY: Doubleday. ISBN 978-0385009140.
- Ramsay, William Mitchell (1895). St. Paul the Traveller and the Roman Citizen. London: Hodder and Stoughton. pp. 277–282. OCLC 462703959.
- Stoops, Robert F. (1989). "Riot and Assembly: The Social Context of Acts 19: 23-41". Journal of Biblical Literature. 108 (1): 73–91. doi:10.2307/3267471. eISSN 1934-3876.
- Trebilco, Paul (1994). "Asia". The Book of Acts in its Graeco-Roman Setting. The Book of Acts in its First Century Setting. Vol. II. Grand Rapids: Eerdmans. pp. 291–364. ISBN 978-0802848475.
- Tripp, Jeffrey M. (2014). "A Tale of Two Riots: The synkrisis of the Temples of Ephesus and Jerusalem in Acts 19–23". Journal for the Study of the New Testament. 37 (1): 86–111. eISSN 1745-5294.
- Wellhausen, Julius (1914). Kritische Analyse der Apostelgeschichte (in German). Berlin: Weidmann. p. 41. OCLC 299785087.
