= Book burning =

Practice of destroying, books or other written material

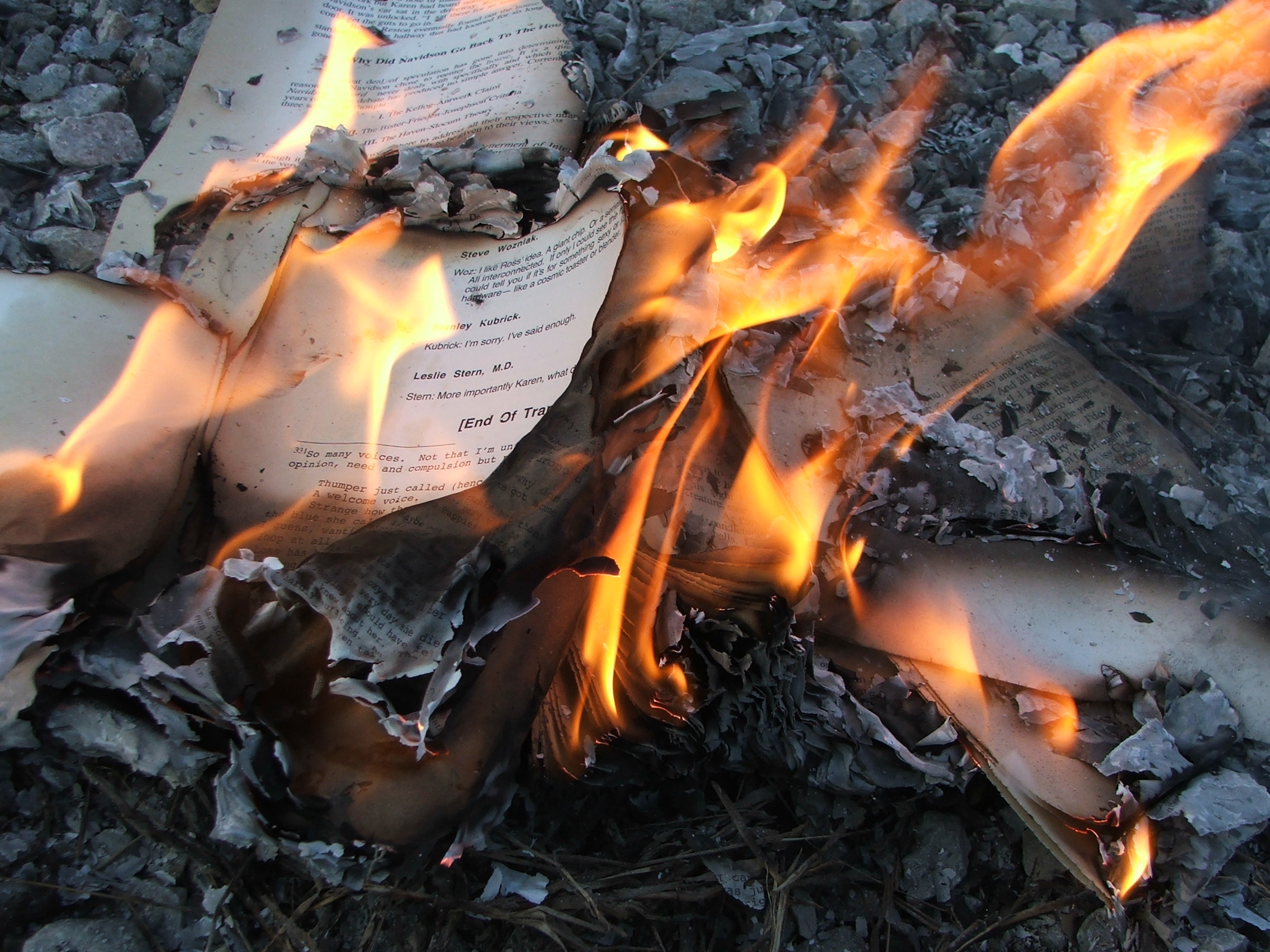
A copy of House of Leaves being burned

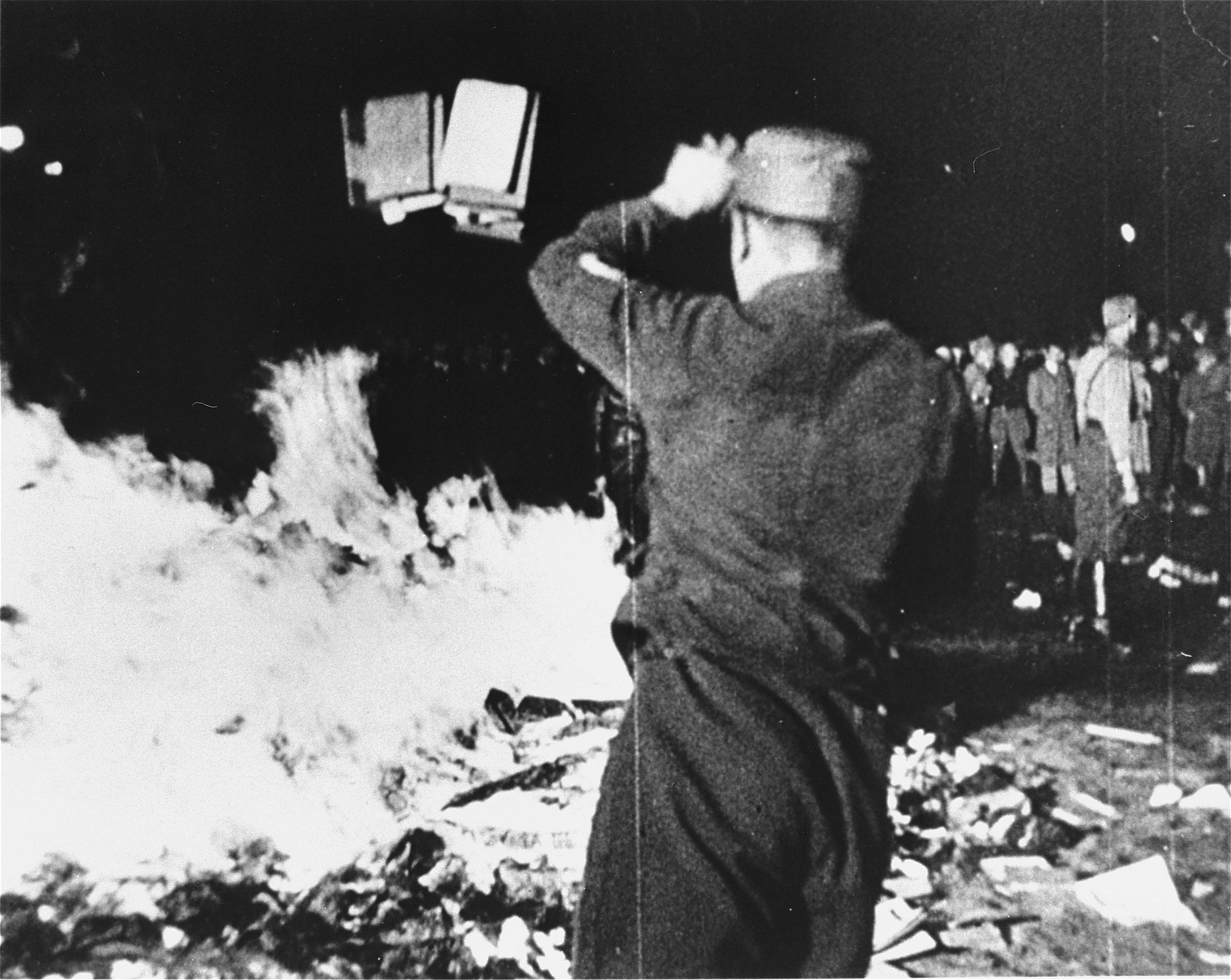
Nazi youth brigades burning "un-German" works by Jewish and left-wing authors at the library of the Institut für Sexualwissenschaft, 1933

Book burning is the deliberate destruction by fire of books or other written materials, usually carried out in a public context. The burning of books represents an element of censorship and usually proceeds from a cultural, religious, or political opposition to the materials in question. Book burning can be an act of contempt for the book's contents or author, intended to draw wider public attention to this opposition, or conceal the information contained in the text from being made public, such as diaries or ledgers. Burning and other methods of destruction are together known as biblioclasm or libricide.

In some cases, the destroyed works are irreplaceable and their burning constitutes a severe loss to cultural heritage. Examples include the burning of books and burying of scholars under China's Qin dynasty (213–210 BCE), the destruction of the House of Wisdom during the Mongol siege of Baghdad (1258), the destruction of Aztec codices by Itzcoatl (1430s), the burning of Maya codices on the order of bishop Diego de Landa (1562), and the burning of Jaffna Public Library in Sri Lanka (1981).

In other cases, such as the Nazi book burnings, copies of the destroyed books survive, but the instance of book burning becomes emblematic of a harsh and oppressive regime which is seeking to censor or silence some aspect of prevailing culture.

In modern times, other forms of media, such as phonograph records, video tapes, and CDs have also been burned, shredded, or crushed. Art destruction is related to book burning, both because it might have similar cultural, religious, or political connotations, and because in various historical cases, books and artworks were destroyed at the same time.

When the burning is widespread and systematic, destruction of books and media can become a significant component of cultural genocide.

== Historical background ==
The burning of books has a long history of being a tool utilized by authorities both secular and religious, in their efforts to suppress dissenting or heretical views that are believed to pose a threat to the prevailing order.

Books infested with bookworms were sometimes burned in the Medieval era as a rudimentary form of pest control, rather than targeted censorship.

=== Hebrew Bible (7th century BCE) ===
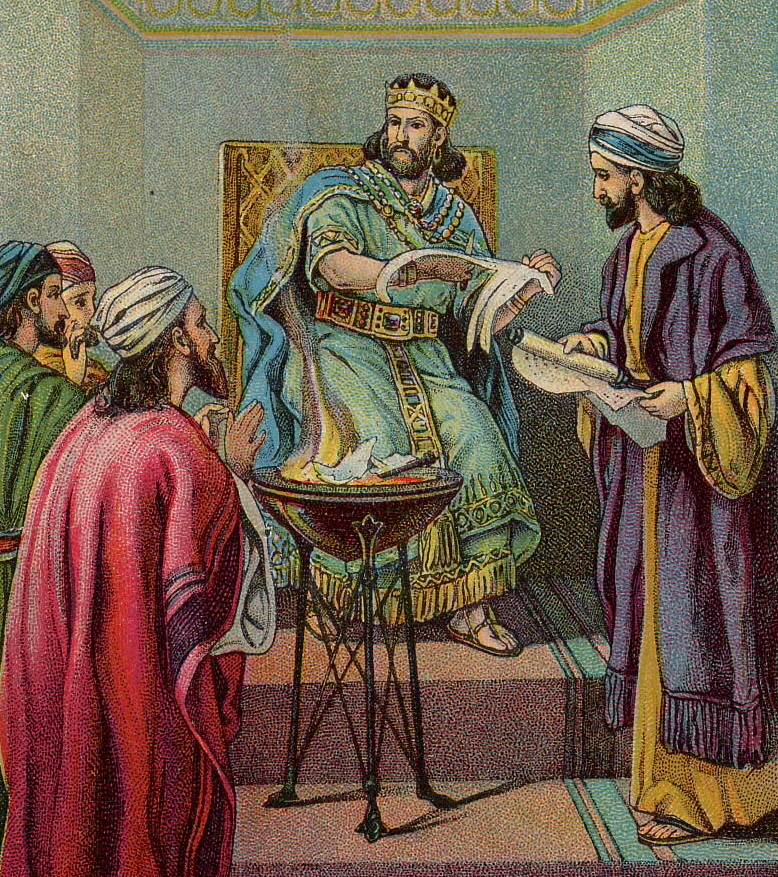
King Jehoiakim burns Jeremiah's scroll.

According to the Hebrew Bible, in the 7th century BCE, King Jehoiakim of Judah burned part of a scroll that Baruch ben Neriah had written at prophet Jeremiah's dictation (see Jeremiah 36).

=== Burning of books and burying of scholars in China (213–210 BCE) ===
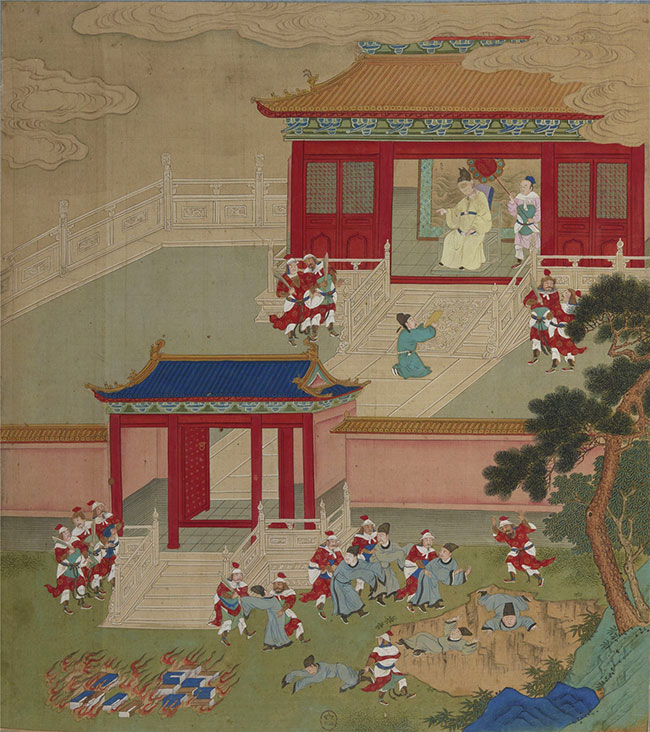
Killing the Scholars and Burning the Books in 210–213 BC (18th-century Chinese painting)

The burning of books as a means of government control goes back to Shang Yang, who had exhorted Duke Xiao of Qin in the fourth century BCE to burn books. In 213 BCE Qin Shi Huang, the first emperor of the Qin dynasty, ordered the burning of books and burying of scholars and in 210 BCE he supposedly ordered the premature burial of 460 Confucian scholars in order to stay on his throne. Though the burning of books is well established, the live burial of scholars has been disputed by modern historians who doubt the details of the story, which first appeared more than a century later in the Han dynasty official Sima Qian's Records of the Grand Historian. The event caused the loss of many philosophical treatises of the Hundred Schools of Thought, with only treatises on agriculture and medicine as well as a collection of divinations allowed to survive. Treatises which advocated the official philosophy of the government ("legalism") survived.

=== Christian book burnings (80–1759 CE) ===
In the New Testament's Acts of the Apostles, it is claimed that Paul performed an exorcism in Ephesus. After men in Ephesus failed to perform the same feat many gave up their "curious arts" and burned the books because apparently, they did not work.

And many that believed, came and confessed and shewed their deeds. Many of them also which used curious arts, brought their books together, and burned them before all men: and they counted the price of them, and found it fifty thousand pieces of silver.

After the First Council of Nicea (325 CE), Roman emperor Constantine the Great issued an edict against nontrinitarian Arians which included a prescription for systematic book-burning:

"In addition, if any writing composed by Arius should be found, it should be handed over to the flames, so that not only will the wickedness of his teaching be obliterated, but nothing will be left even to remind anyone of him. And I hereby make a public order, that if someone should be discovered to have hidden a writing composed by Arius, and not to have immediately brought it forward and destroyed it by fire, his penalty shall be death. As soon as he is discovered in this offense, he shall be submitted for capital punishment....."

Nevertheless, Constantine's edict on Arian works was not rigorously observed, as Arian writings or the theology based on them survived to be burned much later in Spain. According to the Chronicle of Fredegar, Recared, King of the Visigoths (reigned 586–601) and first Catholic king of Spain, following his conversion to Catholicism in 587, ordered that all Arian books should be collected and burned; and all the books of Arian theology were reduced to ashes, along with the house in which they had been purposely collected.

According to Elaine Pagels, "In AD 367, Athanasius, the zealous bishop of Alexandria... issued an Easter letter in which he demanded that Egyptian monks destroy all such unacceptable writings, except for those he specifically listed as 'acceptable' even 'canonical'—a list that constitutes the present 'New Testament'". (Pagels cites Athanasius's Paschal letter (letter 39) for 367 CE, which prescribes a canon, but her citation "cleanse the church from every defilement" (page 177) does not explicitly appear in the Festal letter.) Heretical texts do not turn up as palimpsests, scraped clean and overwritten, as do many texts of Classical antiquity. According to author Rebecca Knuth, multitudes of early Christian texts have been as thoroughly "destroyed" as if they had been publicly burnt.

In 1759 Pope Clement XIII banned all publications written by Swedish biologist Carl Linnaeus from the Vatican, and ordered that all copies of his work be burned.

=== Burning of Nestorian books (435 CE) ===
Activity by Cyril of Alexandria (c. 376–444) brought fire to almost all the writings of Nestorius (386–450) shortly after 435. 'The writings of Nestorius were originally very numerous', however, they were not part of the Nestorian or Oriental theological curriculum until the mid-sixth century, unlike those of his teacher Theodore of Mopsuestia, and those of Diodorus of Tarsus, even then they were not key texts, so relatively few survive intact.

=== Muslim book burnings (650 CE - 15th century CE) ===
Uthman ibn 'Affan, the third Caliph of Islam after Muhammad, who is credited with overseeing the collection of the verses of the Qur'an, ordered after that in c. 650 the destruction of any other remaining text containing verses of the Qur'an in order to ensure that his version become the only source for others to follow. During the Muslim conquests of the Middle East, many libraries, such as that of Caesarea Maritima, were burned, and during the conquest of Khwarazm books were destroyed in order to weaken the identity and resistance of the local population. Books of other religions were also explicitly burned. In 923, Manichean books were burned at the public gate of Baghdad together with a portrait of Mani. Similarly, Sikandar Shah Miri, sultan of Kashmir, forced Hindu conversions and burned books in the fifteenth century.

Often books were burned for belonging to another Muslim denominations. During the Abbasid invasion of Oman in 892, the army of Muhammad ibn Nur burnt books of the Ibadis, which probably also contributed to the paucity of sources on early south-east Arabia's history. The Sunni Ghaznavid ruler Mahmud burned after his sack of Rayy a great part of the city's library books as he considered the books, many of them Shiite, heretical. A similar thing happened during the Seljuks takeover of Buyid Baghdad in 1059 when the famous dar al-'ilm was burned.

Books were also burned in Muslim Spain between the tenth and twelfth century under the Umayyad, Amirid, Abbadid, Almoravid and Almohad dynasties, often of writers that were deemed heretical or a challenge to the rulers. During the rule of caliph Abu Yusuf Yaqub the possession of books on logic or philosophy (hikma) was forbidden and many books, including those by the famous Ibn Rushd, burned.

=== French burning of Jewish manuscripts (1244 CE) ===
In 1244, as an outcome of the Disputation of Paris, twenty-four carriage loads of Talmuds and other Jewish religious manuscripts were set on fire by French law officers in the streets of Paris.

=== Aztec book burning (1430) ===
According to the Florentine Codex, Itzcoatl ordered the burning of all historical codices because it was "not wise that all the people should know the paintings". Among other purposes, this allowed the Aztec state to develop a state-sanctioned official history and mythos that venerated Huitzilopochtli.

=== Spanish burning of Aztec and Mayan manuscripts (1560s CE) ===
During the Spanish colonization of the Americas, numerous books written by indigenous peoples were burned by the Spaniards. Several books written by the Aztecs were burnt by Spanish conquistadors and priests during the Spanish conquest of Yucatán. Despite opposition from Catholic friar Bartolomé de las Casas, numerous books found by the Spanish in Yucatán were burnt on the order of Bishop Diego de Landa in 1562. De Landa wrote on the incident that "We found a large number of books in these characters and, as they contained nothing in which were not to be seen as superstition and lies of the devil, we burned them all, which they (the Maya) regretted to an amazing degree, and which caused them much affliction".He was then condemned in Spain by the Council of the Indies, which in 1543 had expressly forbidden Inquisitorial methods in New Spain. Later, however, an investigation by crown authorities exonerated Landa, and he was appointed bishop of Yucatán in 1572.

=== Book burnings in Tudor and Stuart England (16th century CE) ===
The founding of the Church of England after King Henry VIII broke away from the Catholic Church led to the targeting of English Catholics by Protestants. The dissolution of the monasteries led to the destruction of many libraries and Edward VI, Henry's son, encouraged his subjects to destroy all books that were associated with "old learning". Throughout the Tudor and Stuart periods, Protestant citizens loyal to the Crown attacked Catholic religious sites across England, frequently burning any religious texts they found. These acts were encouraged by the Crown, who pressured the general public to take part in such "spectacles". According to American historian David Cressy, over "the course of the sixteenth and seventeenth centuries book burning developed from a rare to an occasional occurrence, relocated from an outdoor to an indoor procedure, and changed from a bureaucratic to a quasi-theatrical performance".

With the Bishops' Ban of 1599 the Archbishop of Canterbury and the Bishop of London ordered an end to the production of verse satire and the confiscation and the burning of specific extant works, including works by John Marston and Thomas Middleton. Nine books were specifically singled out for destruction. Scholars disagree about what properties these nine books have in common to cause official offence.

=== Burning of Voltaire's books (18th century CE) ===
During the 18th century, the works of French philosopher and writer Voltaire were repeatedly burned by government officials in the kingdoms of France and Prussia. In 1734, the publication of his Lettres philosophiques in the city of Rouen led to a public outcry, as it was seen as an attack against the ancien régime of France. In response, the French authorities ordered copies of book to be publicly confiscated and burnt, and Voltaire was forced to flee Paris. In 1751, King of Prussia Frederick the Great ordered a pamphlet written by Voltaire titled Doctor Akakia to be publicly burnt as it insulted Pierre Louis Maupertuis, the president of the Prussian Academy of Sciences in Berlin, of whom Frederick was a significant patron.

=== Burning of abolitionist books in the American South (1859–60 CE) ===
Following John Brown's raid on Harpers Ferry in 1859, slaveholders and their supporters spread panic about abolitionism, believing that anti-slavery conspiracies would lead to widespread slave revolts. Pro-slavery southerners burned books in Mississippi, South Carolina, and Texas, including textbooks from public schools. Books that were critical of slavery, or insufficiently supportive of it, were seen as "anti-Southern" by the book-burners.

=== Comstock book burnings in the United States (1873–1950 CE) ===
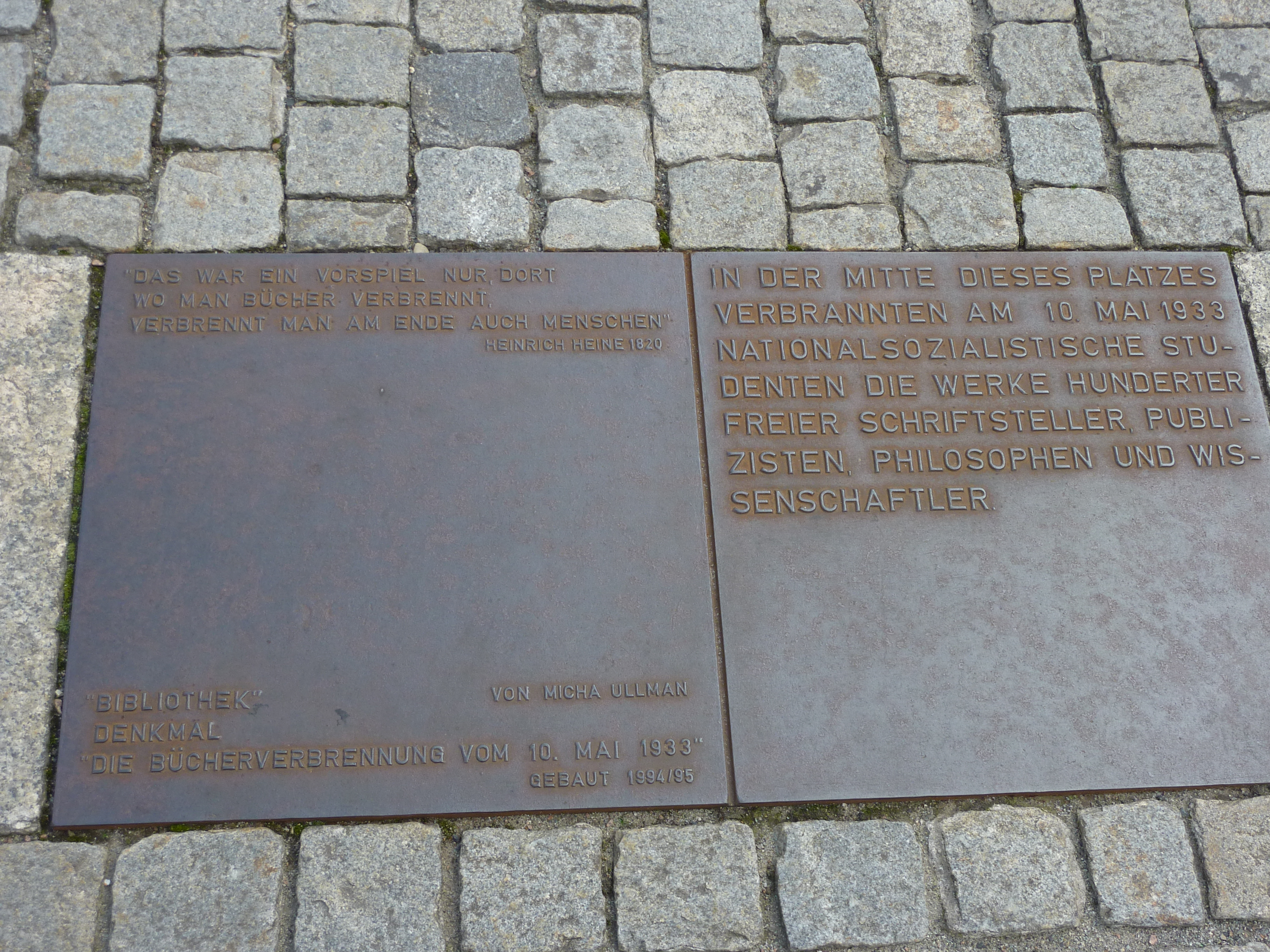
Plaque at Bebelplaz commemorating Nazi book burning, 10 May 1933

Anthony Comstock's New York Society for the Suppression of Vice, founded in 1873, inscribed book burning on its seal, as a worthy goal to be achieved. Comstock's total accomplishment in a long and influential career is estimated to have been the destruction of some 15 tons of books, 284,000 pounds of plates for printing such "objectionable" books, and nearly 4,000,000 pictures. All of this material was defined as "lewd" by Comstock's very broad definition of the term – which he and his associates successfully lobbied the United States Congress to incorporate in the Comstock Law.

=== Nazi regime (1933 CE) ===
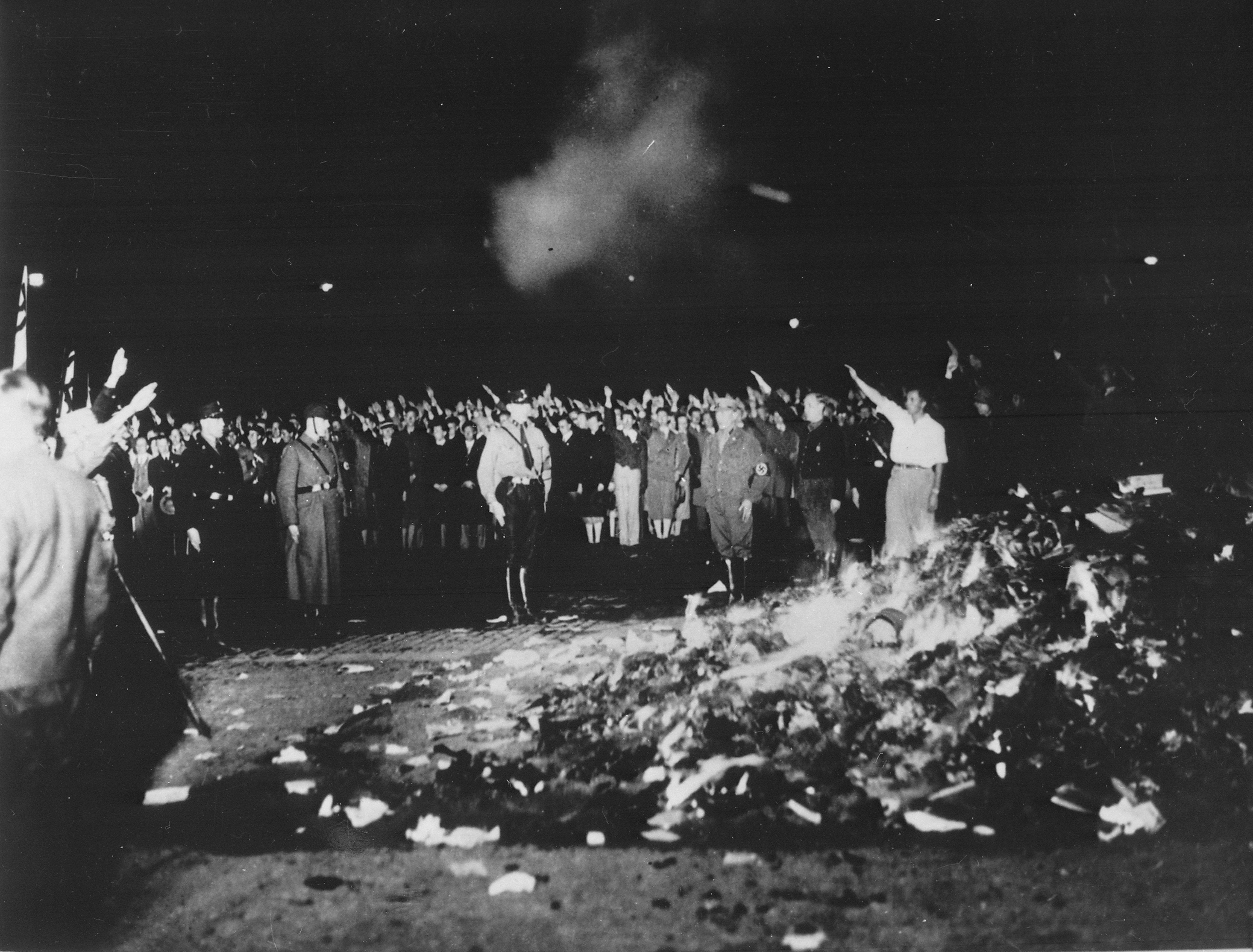
Thousands of books smoulder in a huge bonfire as Germans give the Nazi salute during the wave of book-burnings that spread throughout Nazi Germany.

The Nazi government decreed broad grounds for burning material "which acts subversively on Nazi Germany's future or strikes at the root of German thought, the German home and the driving forces of German people".

=== Allied occupation of Japan (1945–1952 CE) ===
During the Allied occupation of Japan, GHQ officials banned any kind of criticism of the Allies or "reactionary" political ideas and many books were confiscated and burned. Over 7,000 books were destroyed.

== Burnings by authors ==
In 1588, the exiled English Catholic William Cardinal Allen wrote "An Admonition to the Nobility and People of England", a work sharply attacking Queen Elizabeth I. It was to be published in Spanish-occupied England in the event of the Spanish Armada succeeding in its invasion. Upon the defeat of the Armada, Allen carefully consigned his publication to the fire, and it is only known of through one of Elizabeth's spies, who had stolen a copy.

Carlo Goldoni is known to have burned his first play, a tragedy called Amalasunta in the 1730s, when encountering unfavorable criticism.

The Hassidic Rabbi Nachman of Breslov is reported to have written a book which he himself burned in 1808. To this day, his followers mourn "The Burned Book" and seek in their Rabbi's surviving writings for clues as to what the lost volume contained and why it was destroyed.

Nikolai Gogol burned the second half of his 1842 magnum opus Dead Souls, having come under the influence of a priest who persuaded him that his work was sinful; Gogol later described this as a mistake.

As noted in Claire Tomalin's intensively researched "The Invisible Woman", Charles Dickens is known to have made a big bonfire of his letters and private papers, as well as asking friends and acquaintances to either return letters which he wrote to them or themselves destroy the letters – and most complied with his request in the 1850s and the 1860s. Dickens' purpose was to destroy evidence of his affair with the actress Nelly Ternan. To judge from surviving Dickens letters, the destroyed material – even if not intended for publication – might have had considerable literary merit.

Martin Gardner, a well-known expert on the work of Lewis Carroll, believes that Carroll had written an earlier version in the 1860s of Alice in Wonderland which he later destroyed after writing a more elaborate version which he presented to the child Alice who inspired the book.

In the 1870s Tchaikovsky destroyed the full manuscript of his first opera, The Voyevoda. Decades later, during the Soviet period, The Voyevoda was posthumously reconstructed from surviving orchestral and vocal parts and the composer's sketches.

=== 20th century ===
Alberto Santos-Dumont, after being considered a spy by the French government in 1914 and then having this deception excused by the police, he destroyed all his aeronautical documents. The following year, according to the afterword to the historical novel "De gevleugelde," Arthur Japin says that when Dumont returned to Brazil, he "burned all his diaries, letters and drawings."

After Hector Hugh Munro (better known by the pen name Saki) was killed in World War I in November 1916, his sister Ethel destroyed most of his papers.

There is substantial evidence that Finnish composer Jean Sibelius worked on an Eighth Symphony. He promised the premiere of this symphony to Serge Koussevitzky in 1931 and 1932, and a London performance in 1933 under Basil Cameron was even advertised to the public. However, no such symphony was ever performed, and the only concrete evidence of the symphony's existence on paper is a 1933 bill for a fair copy of the first movement and short draft fragments first published and played in 2011. Sibelius had always been quite self-critical; he remarked to his close friends, "If I cannot write a better symphony than my Seventh, then it shall be my last." Since no manuscript survives, sources consider it likely that Sibelius destroyed most traces of the score, probably in 1945, during which year he certainly consigned a great many papers to the flames.

Aino, Sibelius' wife, recalled that "In the 1940s there was a great auto da fé at Ainola [where the Sibelius couple lived]. My husband collected a number of the manuscripts in a laundry basket and burned them on the open fire in the dining room. Parts of the Karelia Suite were destroyed – I later saw remains of the pages which had been torn out – and many other things. I did not have the strength to be present and left the room. I therefore do not know what he threw on to the fire. But after this my husband became calmer and gradually lighter in mood." It is assumed that a draft of Sibelius' Eighth Symphony - which he worked on in the early 1930s but with which he was not satisfied - was among the papers destroyed.

Joe Shuster, who together with Jerry Siegel created the fictional superhero Superman, in 1938 burned the first Superman story when under the impression that it would not find a publisher.

Axel Jensen made his debut as a novelist in Oslo in 1955 with the novel Dyretemmerens kors, but he later burned the remaining unsold copies of the book.

In August 1963, when C.S. Lewis resigned from Magdalene College, Cambridge and his rooms there were being cleaned out, Lewis gave instructions to Douglas Gresham to destroy all his unfinished or incomplete fragments of manuscript - which scholars researching Lewis' work regard as a grievous loss.

In 1976 detractors of Venezuelan liberal writer Carlos Rangel publicly burned copies of his book From the Noble Savage to the Noble Revolutionary in the year of its publication at the Central University of Venezuela.

== Books saved from burning ==
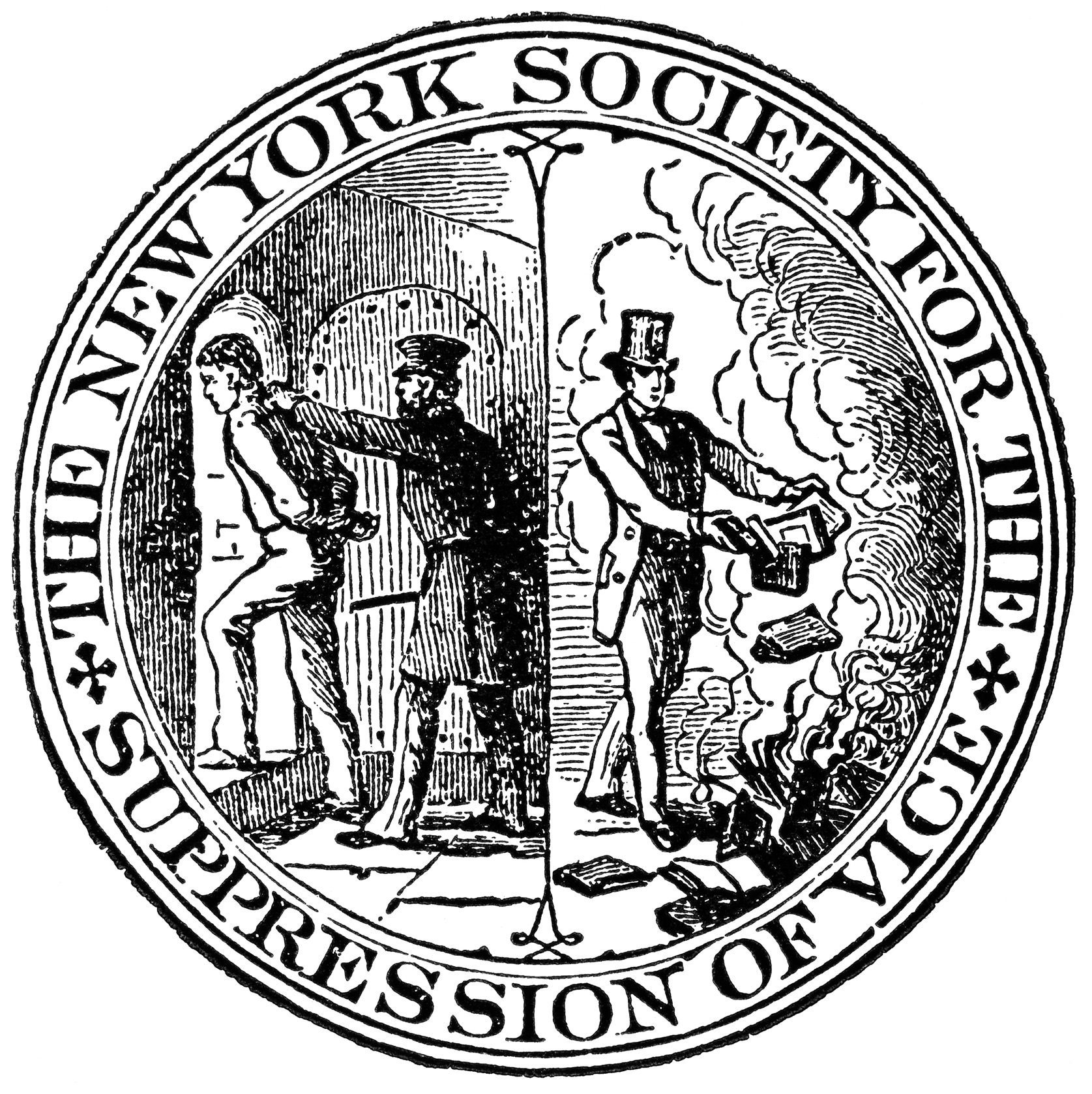
Symbol of the "New York Society for the Suppression of Vice", advocating book-burning

In Catholic hagiography, Saint Vincent of Saragossa is mentioned as having been offered his life on condition that he consign Scripture to the fire; he refused and was martyred. He is often depicted holding the book which he protected with his life.

Another book-saving Catholic saint is the 10th-century Saint Wiborada. She is credited with having predicted in 925 an invasion by the then-pagan Hungarians of her region in Switzerland. Her warning allowed the priests and religious of St. Gall and St. Magnus to hide their books and wine and escape into caves in nearby hills. Wiborada herself refused to escape and was killed by the marauders, being later canonized. In art, she is commonly represented holding a book to signify the library she saved, and is considered a patron saint of libraries and librarians.

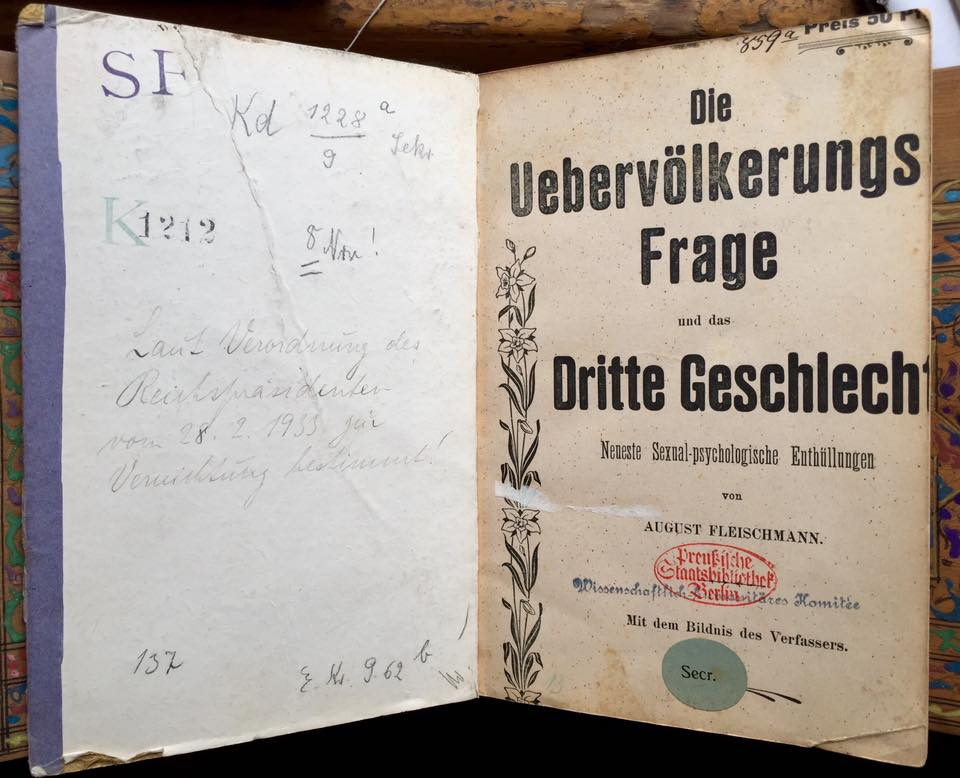
Vita homosexualis, a 1902 collection of August Fleischmann's popular pamphlets on third gender and against §175 - a Wissenschaftlich-humanitäres Komitee library copy, confiscated on 6 May 1933, annotated on the endpaper: By Reichspräsident's decree of 28.02.1933 destined for destruction! and hidden from the publique (label "Secr.") as Nazi plunder by the Prussian State Library.

During a tour of Thuringia in 1525, Martin Luther became enraged at the widespread burning of libraries along with other buildings during the German Peasants' War, writing Against the Murderous, Thieving Hordes of Peasants in response.

During the Revolutions of 1848 in the Austrian Empire the Imperial Court Library (now Austrian National Library) was in extreme danger, when the bombardment of Vienna caused the burning of the Hofburg, in which the Imperial Library was located. The fire was halted in a timely manner - saving countless irreplaceable books, diligently collected by many generations of Habsburg emperors and the scholars in their employ.

At the beginning of the Battle of Monte Cassino in World War II, two German officers – Viennese-born Lt. Col. Julius Schlegel (a Roman Catholic) and Captain Maximilian Becker (a Protestant) – had the foresight to transfer the Monte Cassino archives to the Vatican. Otherwise the archives – containing a vast number of documents relating to the 1500-years' history of the Abbey as well as some 1,400 irreplaceable manuscript codices, chiefly patristic and historical – would have been destroyed in the Allied air bombing which almost completely destroyed the Abbey shortly afterwards. Also saved by the two officers' prompt action were the collections of the Keats-Shelley Memorial House in Rome, which had been sent to the Abbey for safety in December 1942.

The Sarajevo Haggadah – one of the oldest and most valuable Jewish illustrated manuscripts, with immense historical and cultural value – was hidden from the Nazis and their Ustaše collaborators by Derviš Korkut, chief librarian of the National Museum in Sarajevo. At risk to his own life, Korkut smuggled the Haggadah out of Sarajevo and gave it for safekeeping to a Muslim cleric in Zenica, where it was hidden until the end of the war under the floorboards of either a mosque or a Muslim home. The Haggadah again survived destruction during the wars which followed the breakup of Yugoslavia.

In 1940s France, a group of anti-fascist exiles created a Library of Burned Books which housed all the books that Adolf Hitler had destroyed. This library contained copies of titles that were burned by the Nazis in their campaign to cleanse German culture of Jewish and foreign influences such as pacifist and decadent literature. The Nazis themselves planned to make a "museum" of Judaism once the Final Solution was complete to house certain books that they had saved.

== Posthumous destruction of works ==
When Virgil died, he left instructions that his manuscript of the Aeneid was to be burnt, as it was a draft version with uncorrected faults and not a final version for release. However, this instruction was ignored. It is mainly to the Aeneid, published in this "imperfect" form, that Virgil owes his lasting fame – and it is considered one of the great masterpieces of classical literature as a whole.

Before his death, Franz Kafka wrote to his friend and literary executor Max Brod: "Dearest Max, my last request: Everything I leave behind me... in the way of diaries, manuscripts, letters (my own and others'), sketches, and so on, [is] to be burned unread." Brod overrode Kafka's wishes, believing that Kafka had given these directions to him, specifically, because Kafka knew he would not honour them – Brod had told him as much. Had Brod carried out Kafka's instructions, virtually the whole of Kafka's work – except for a few short stories published in his lifetime – would have been lost forever. Most critics, at the time and up to the present, justify Brod's decision. In his foreword to Kafka's The Castle Brod noted that when entering Kafka's apartment after his death, he found several big empty folders and traces of burnt paper - the manuscripts which were in these folders having evidently been destroyed by Kafka himself before his death. Brod expressed pain at the irreversible loss of this material and happiness at having saved so much of Kafka's work from its creator's ruthlessness.

A similar case concerns the noted American poet Emily Dickinson, who died in 1886 and left to her sister Lavinia the instruction of burning all her papers. Lavinia Dickinson did burn almost all of her sister's correspondences, but interpreted the will as not including the forty notebooks and loose sheets, all filled with almost 1800 poems; these Lavinia saved and began to publish the poems that year. Had Lavinia Dickinson been more strict in carrying out her sister's will, all but a small handful of Emily Dickinson's poetic work would have been lost.

In early 1964, several months after the death of C.S. Lewis, Lewis' literary executor Walter Hooper, rescued a 64-page manuscript from a bonfire of the author's writings – the burning carried out according to Lewis' will. In 1977, Hooper published it under the name The Dark Tower. It was apparently intended as part of Lewis' Space Trilogy. Though incomplete and evidently an early draft which Lewis abandoned, its publication aroused great interest and a continued discussion among Lewis fans and scholars researching his work.

== Modern biblioclasm ==
Although the act of destroying books is condemned by the majority of the world's societies, book burning still occurs on a small or large scale.

=== 20th century ===
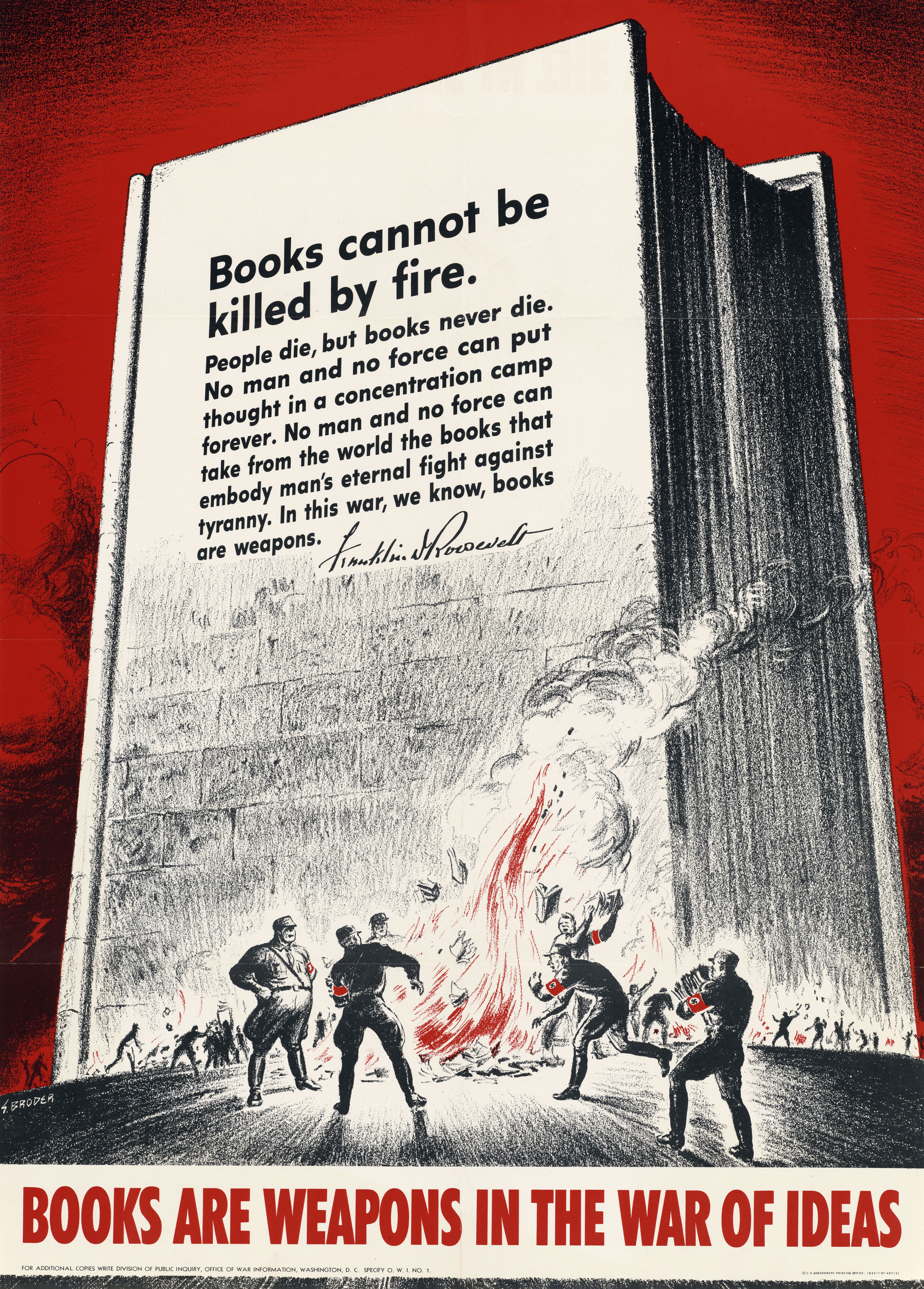
An American World War II-era propaganda poster attacking Nazi book burnings: "Books are weapons in the war of ideas"

During World War I, German language books were burned throughout the United States.

In Azerbaijan, when a modified Latin alphabet was adopted, books which were published in the Arabic script were burned, especially those published in the late 1920s and 1930s. The texts were not limited to the Quran; medical and historical manuscripts were also destroyed.

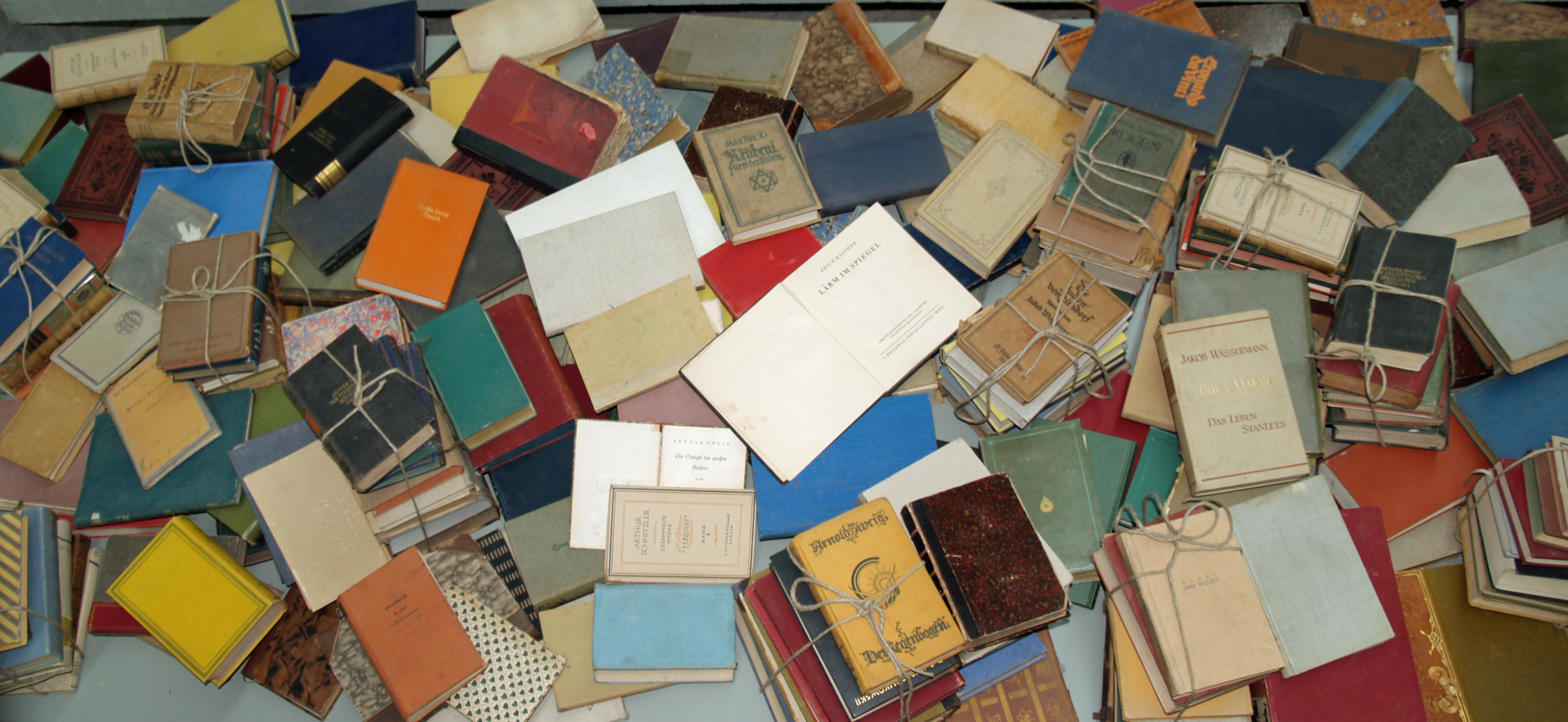
Copies of books which were burned by the Nazis, on display at Yad Vashem

Book burnings were regularly organised in Nazi Germany in the 1930s by stormtroopers so that "degenerate" works could be destroyed, especially works written by Jewish authors such as Thomas Mann, Marcel Proust, and Karl Marx. One of the most infamous book burnings in the 20th century occurred in Frankfurt, Germany, on May 10, 1933. Organized by Joseph Goebbels, books were burned in a celebratory fashion, complete with bands, marchers, and songs. Seeking to "cleanse" German culture of the "un-German" spirit, Goebbels compelled students (who were egged on by their professors) to perform the book burning. To some this could be easily dismissed as the childish actions of the youth, but to many in Europe and America, it was a horrific display of power and disrespect. During the denazification which followed the war, literature which had been confiscated by the Allies was reduced to pulp rather than burned.

In 1937, during Getúlio Vargas' dictatorship in Brazil, several books by authors such as Jorge Amado and José Lins do Rego were burned in an anti-communist act.

In the People's Republic of China from the 1940s to present day, library officials publicize the burning of "illegal publications, religious publications".

In 1942, local Catholic priests forced Irish storyteller Timothy Buckley to burn a book The Tailor and Ansty by Eric Cross about Buckley and his wife, because of its sexual frankness.

In the 1950s, over six tons of books by Wilhelm Reich were burned in the U.S. in compliance with judicial orders. In 1954, the works of Mordecai Kaplan were burned by Orthodox Jewish rabbis in America, after Kaplan was excommunicated.

Dozens of public comic book burnings were held across the United States between 1945 and 1955. In Denmark, a comic book burning took place on 23 June 1955. It was a bonfire which consisted of comic books topped by a life-size cardboard cutout of The Phantom.

During the military dictatorship in Brazil from (1964-1985), several methods of censure were used, among them, torture and the burning of books by firemen.

Some supporters have celebrated book-burning cases in art and other media. Such is the case in Italy in 1973 with The Burning of Heretical Books over a side door on the façade of Santa Maria Maggiore, Rome, the bas-relief by Giovanni Battista Maini, which depicts the burning of "heretical" books as a triumph of righteousness.

During the years of the Chilean military dictatorship under Augusto Pinochet from 1973 to 1990, hundreds of books were burned as a way of repression and censorship of left-wing literature. In some instances, even books on Cubism were burned because soldiers thought it had to do with the Cuban Revolution.

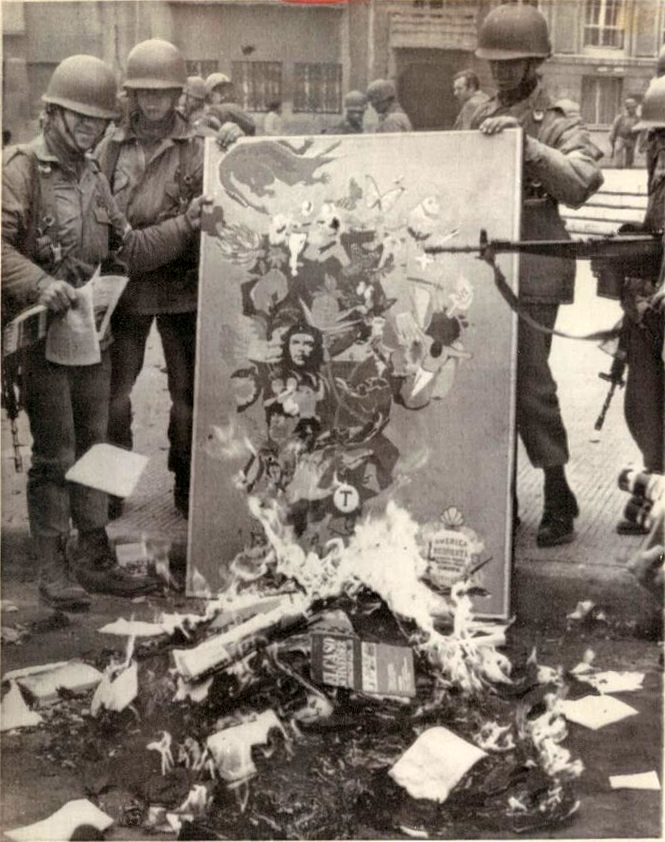
Book burning in Chile following the 1973 coup that installed the Pinochet dictatorship

In 1981, the Jaffna Public Library in Jaffna, Sri Lanka, was burned down by Sinhalese police and paramilitaries during a pogrom against the minority Tamil population. At the time of its burning, it contained almost 100,000 Tamil books and rare documents.

Kjell Ludvik Kvavik, a senior Norwegian official, had a penchant for removing maps and other pages from rare books and he was noticed in January 1983 by a young college student. The student, Barbro Andenaes, reported the actions of the senior official to the superintendent of the reading room and then reported them to the head librarian of the university library in Oslo. Hesitant to make the accusation against Kvavik public because it would greatly harm his career, even if it was proven to be false, the media did not divulge his name until his house was searched by police. The authorities seized 470 maps and prints as well as 112 books that Kvavik had illegally obtained. While this may not have been the large-scale, violent demonstration which usually occurs during wars, Kvavik's disregard for libraries and books shows that the destruction of books on any scale can affect an entire country. Here, a senior official in the Norwegian government was disgraced and the University Library was only refunded for a small portion of the costs which it had incurred from the loss and destruction of rare materials and the security changes that had to be made as a result of it. In this case, the lure of personal profit and the desire to enhance one's own collection were the causes of the defacement of rare books and maps. While the main goal was not destruction for destruction's sake, the resulting damage to the ephemera still carries weight within the library community.

In 1984, during India’s attack at Sikh Golden Temple, Indian forces ransacked the Sikh Reference Library which held invaluable manuscripts and records in relation to Sikh and wider history. Much of the material was confiscated and remaining newspaper archives etc. were burned by the Army later claiming falsely that the fire broke out due to crossfire between Sikh militants and government forces. The whereabouts of large volume of works which vanished during the attack are unknown.

During the apartheid period in South Africa the government routinely burned books that it banned due to their political content. This began in the 1950s and continued until the 1970s, with tens of thousands of books being destroyed. Libraries also burned their copies of books when they were banned. The bans on books were lifted in the 1980s following advocacy from a small number of librarians.

In 1984, Amsterdam's South African Institute was infiltrated by an organized group which was bent on drawing attention to the inequality of apartheid. Well-organized and assuring patrons of the library that no harm would come to them, group members systematically smashed microfiche machines and threw books into the nearby waterway. Indiscriminate with regard to the content which was being destroyed, shelf after shelf was cleared of its contents until the group left. Staff members fished books from the water in hopes of salvaging the rare editions of travel books, documents about the Boer Wars, and contemporary materials which were both for and against apartheid. Many of these materials were destroyed by oil, ink, and paint that the anti-apartheid demonstrators had flung around the library. The world was outraged by the loss of knowledge that these demonstrators had caused, and instead of supporting their cause and drawing people's attention to the issue of apartheid, the international community denounced their actions at Amsterdam's South African Institute. Some of the demonstrators came forward and sought to justify their actions by accusing the institute of being pro-apartheid and claiming that nothing was being done to change the status quo in South Africa.

=== 21st century ===
The advent of the digital age has resulted in the cataloguing of an immense collection of written works, exclusively or primarily in digital form. The intentional deletion or removal of these works has often been referred to as a new form of book burning. For example, Amazon, the world's largest online marketplace, has increasingly banned the sale of controversial books. An article in The New York Times reported that "Booksellers that sell on Amazon say the retailer has no coherent philosophy about what it decides to prohibit, and seems largely guided by public complaints."

A biblioclastic incident occurred in Mullumbimby, New South Wales, Australia in 2009. Reported as "just like the ritual burning of books in Nazi Germany", a book-burning ceremony was held by students of the "socially harmful cult" Universal Medicine, an esoteric healing business which was owned by Serge Benhayon. Students were invited to throw their books onto the pyre. Most of the volumes were on Chinese medicine, kinesiology, acupuncture, homeopathy and other alternative healing modalities, all of which Benhayon has decreed evil or "prana".

Russian nationalists burned Ukrainian history books in Crimea in 2010. Pro-Russian demonstrators burned books in Eastern Ukraine in 2014.

Since the beginning of the Yemeni civil war in 2014, many Zaydi libraries have been destroyed, often deliberately by Salafi militants. These libraries are a unique part of Yemen's cultural life due to the intellectual heritage included and its preservation of the teachings of the Mu’tazilites.

In 2015, ISIS burned some 8,000 books it had taken from the Central Library of Mosul, including some books and manuscripts dating back 800 years, as they allegedly "promoted infidelity and called for disobeying Allah". Some local bookshop owners claimed that the group was only burning 'normal books' and were intending to sell the rare books on the black market in order to finance their operations.

After the failed 2016 Turkish coup d'état, the Turkish government burned 301,878 books deemed related to the coup or its alleged leader, Fethullah Gülen, including 18 textbooks with the word "Pennsylvania" in them. Photos of books being burned became a viral sensation on the internet once they were taken by a website named Kronos27.

In April 2019, priests in Gdańsk, Poland, burned Harry Potter books.

In 2019, the French-language Providence Catholic School Board in southwestern Ontario held a 'flame purification' ceremony and burned around thirty recently banned children's books. The ashes were used as fertilizer to plant trees and according to the participants the action was 'to turn a negative to a positive'. The books included Tintin and Asterix and were deemed harmful to Indigenous people.

Since the introduction of the controversial national security law targeted towards Hong Kong in 2020, multiple counts of biblioclasm have been reported. Shortly after the introduction of the new law, books written by prominent Hong Kong pro-democracy figures, including Joshua Wong and Tanya Chan, have been removed from public libraries. In 2021, 29 previously available titles about the Tiananmen Massacre are completely removed from the public libraries, whilst 94 of the remaining 120 titles are only available on request. In 2022, reported by local media, three secondary schools removed more than 400 books since June 2021. Unlike the two book burning happened in the public libraries, the schools were not given any concrete criteria but the schools had to perform the self-censorship themselves. Titles that were removed included those related to the 2019-2020 Hong Kong protests, Tiananmen Massacre and jailed activists. In the same year, the Hong Kong government also refused to provide a list of books that have been removed from the public libraries.

In February 2021, some religious communities in the United States have started holding book burning ceremonies to garner attention and publicly denounce heretical beliefs. In Tennessee pastor Greg Locke has held sermons over the incineration of books like Harry Potter and Twilight. This trend of calling for the burning of books one's ideology conflicts with has continued into the political sphere. Two members of a Virginia school board Rabih Abuismail, and Kirk Twigg, have condoned the burning of recently banned books to keep their ideas out of the minds of the public. In September 2023, Missouri State Senator and gubernatorial candidate Bill Eigel showed off a flamethrower at a campaign event and vowed to burn "woke pornographic books [...] on the front lawn of the governor's mansion" if elected.

During the Russian invasion of Ukraine, the destruction of Ukrainian books, especially on the history of Ukraine and the history of the Russian-Ukrainian war, are known. In Mariupol, Russians burned all the books from the library of the church of Petro Mohyla. In the temporarily occupied Mariupol, Russian invaders threw away books from the library collections of the Pryazovskyi State Technical University. Russian “military police” seized and destroyed books on Ukrainian history and culture in the occupied territories in the Northeast of Ukraine. There are also cases of destruction and damage to the Ukrainian archives with documents about Soviet repression and attempts to introduce Russian re-educational programs in Melitopol.

In 2024, AI company Anthropic reportedly destroyed 2 million individual books as part of Project Panama, a book-scanning project designed to train its AI assistant, Claude. Other companies have similar programs and even target rare books that might not have any backup copies.

== Sikh book burning ==
In the Sikh religion, any copies of their sacred book, Guru Granth Sahib, which are too badly damaged to be used, and any printer's waste which bears any of its text, are cremated. This ritual is called an Agan Bhet, and it is similar to the ritual which is performed when a deceased Sikh is cremated.

== Book burnings in popular culture ==
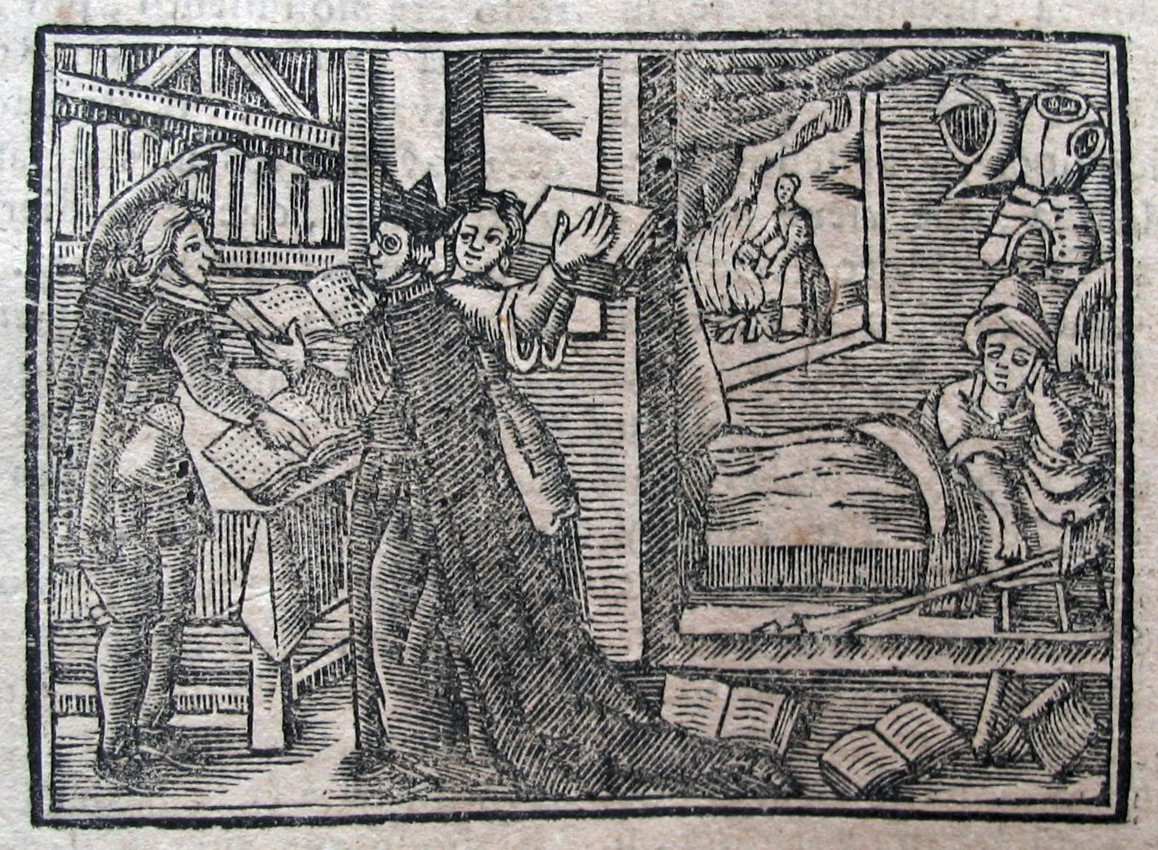
1741 woodcut illustrating the examination and burning of Don Quixote's library

- In chapters 6 and 7 of the first part of Don Quixote, the titular character's parish priest, relatives, and friends examine his library, full with chivalry romances and other books, and decide to burn most of them and seal the room. The comments of the priest allow author Cervantes to praise or condemn the books, while subtly satirizing the Spanish Inquisition.
- In his 1821 play, Almansor, the German writer Heinrich Heine – referring to the burning of the Muslim holy book, the Qur'an, during the Spanish Inquisition – wrote, "Where they burn books, so too will they in the end burn people." ("Dort, wo man Bücher verbrennt, verbrennt man auch am Ende Menschen.") Over a century later, Heine's own books were among the thousands of volumes that were torched by the Nazis in Berlin's Opernplatz, even while his poem "Die Lorelei" continued to be printed in German schoolbooks as "by an unknown author".
- Book burning played a small part in Jules Verne's 1864 Journey to the Center of the Earth. After Professor Lidenbrock deciphers a writing of Arne Saknussem and attempts to recreate his purported subterranean journey, his nephew Axel protests that they should study more of his works before making any rash decisions. Professor Lidenbrock explains that this is impossible: Saknussem was out of favor in his native country, whose leaders ordered all of his writings burned after his death.
- In Ray Bradbury's 1953 novel Fahrenheit 451, about a culture which has outlawed books due to its disdain for learning, books are burned along with the houses they are hidden in.
- In the 1984 film Footloose book burning is a theme that in 2023 was linked to the Banned Books Week.

== See also ==
- Banned books
- Bibliophobia
- Bonfire of the vanities
- Fahrenheit 451
- Ideological repression
- Library fires
- List of book-burning incidents
- List of destroyed libraries
- Maya codices
