= R. McL. Wilson =

Robert McLachlan Wilson, FBA (13 February 1916 – 27 June 2010), commonly known as Robin Wilson and published as R. McL. Wilson, was a Scottish biblical scholar, translator and Church of Scotland minister. An expert on Gnosticism, he was the Professor of Biblical Studies at the University of St Andrews from 1978 to 1983.

== Early life and education ==
Born on 13 February 1916 in Gourock, Wilson was the son of a stonemason-turned-insurance worker and of a seamstress. He attended the Greenock Academy and the Royal High School in Edinburgh before studying classics at the University of Edinburgh; after graduating with an MA in 1939, he completed a BD degree at New College, Edinburgh, in 1942. During these years, he won various prizes and scholarships and was taught by William Manson, John Baillie, Norman Porteus and A. M. Hunter. He then completed a PhD on Gnosticism at the University of Cambridge under the supervision of Wilfred L. Knox; the thesis was submitted in 1945.

== Career ==
Wilson spent nine months as an assistant minister at St Stephen's Church, Edinburgh, before he became the minister at Strathavan in 1946. In 1954, he left his incumbency and was appointed lecturer in New Testament language and literature at the University of St Andrews. His doctoral thesis was published as The Gnostic Problem: A Study of the Relations between Hellenistic Judaism and the Gnostic Heresy in 1958, and his studies of the gospels of Thomas and Philip as preserved in the Nag Hammadi library were published as Studies in the Gospel of Thomas in 1960 and The Gospel of Philip in 1962. He translated and edited the work of the German scholars Edgar Hennecke and Wilhelm Schneemelcher as an English-language anthology New Testament Apocrypha, which was published in 1963–64.

Wilson was promoted to a senior lectureship in 1964 and his book Gnosis and the New Testament was published in 1968. He was appointed to a personal chair (as Professor in New Testament Language and Literature) in 1969. Wilson translated Ernst Haenchen's commentary as The Acts of the Apostles (1971) and his translation of Werner Foerster's anthology of Gnostic texts was published in 1972 and 1974 as Gnosis: A Selection of Gnostic Texts. He was elected a fellow of the British Academy in 1977; that year, he became editor of the journal New Testament Studies (serving until 1983). In 1978 he was appointed to the Professorship of Biblical Criticism in succession to Matthew Black. He was awarded an honorary doctorate by the University of Aberdeen in 1981. For 1981–82, he was president of the international Studiorum Novi Testamenti Societas.

== Later life ==
Retiring in 1983, Wilson was the dedicatee of a Festschrift: The New Testament and Gnosis, edited by Alastair Logan and A. J. M. Wedderburn (1983). Wilson translated Kurt Rudolph's German-language study of Gnosticism as Gnosis: The Nature and History of Gnosticism (1984). He wrote Hebrews in 1987 and received the Burkitt Medal for Biblical Studies in 1990. He wrote Colossians and Philemon (2005). Wilson died on 27 June 2010 in Dundee; his wife Enid has died in 2003. His papers are held in the University of St Andrews Library Department of Special Collections (MS38376); his son donated another cache of Wilson's papers to the Griffith Institute Archive at the University of Oxford (Wilson MSS), where Wilson had already deposited transcripts and notes on New Testament Faiyûmic texts (Kahle MSS 20).
