= Book burnings in Chile =

Destroying of the books in Chile

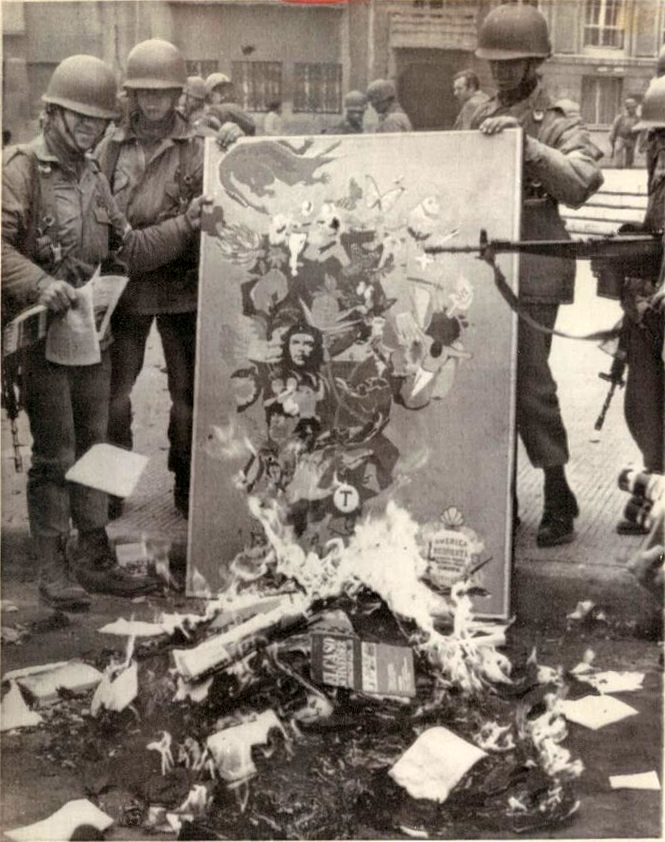
Chilean soldiers burning books in 1973

Book burnings in Chile occurred during the dictatorship of Augusto Pinochet. After he led the 1973 Chilean coup d'etat, his Junta government confiscated and often destroyed literature considered subversive as a policy. Leftist literature was the main target, but other books that did not fit the junta's ideology were also burned, often for part of a campaign to "extirpate the Marxist cancer."

== Historical context to book burning and censorship ==
Following the coup, the military began raids to find potential opponents of the new regime, who were then held and some of them executed at the Estadio Nacional and other places. In addition to this, during the raids the military gathered and burned large numbers of books: not just Marxist literature, but also general sociological literature, newspapers and magazines. In addition to this, such books were withdrawn from the shelves of bookstores and libraries. The regime formally denied that book burnings were happening, although according to Richard Gott, a journalist from the Guardian, Admiral Arturo Troncoso Daroch, told him that he was aware and supportive of book burnings. In some instances, censorship went beyond what was overtly political; an example of this was that books on Cubism were burned because soldiers thought it had to do with the Cuban Revolution.

While sporadic book burning occurred throughout the junta's regime, there was only one major book burning after 1973. On November 28, 1986, the customs authorities seized almost 15,000 copies of Gabriel García Márquez's book Clandestine in Chile, which were later burned by military authorities in Valparaíso. Together with them, copies of a book of essays by Venezuelan ex-guerrilla and presidential candidate Teodoro Petkoff were also burned.

== Responses to book burning ==
The book burning attracted international protests: the American Library Association condemned them, arguing that it is "a despicable form of suppression" which "violates the fundamental rights of the people of Chile." The ALA did not, however, include in its statement any linkage to the responsibility of the United States government in overturning the democratic government and placing the junta in power.

Book burnings per se were not mentioned in the Rettig Report. The report was commissioned to document human rights abuses under the dictatorship by Patricio Aylwin, the first democratically elected president of Chile after the Pinochet regime. It did describe instances where books belonging to dissidents were "impounded" when they were arrested and taken in raids of their houses.

== See also ==
- Book burning
- Nazi book burnings
