= Zakoros =

Zakoros (Ancient Greek: ζάκορος) was an ancient Greek religious office, denoting an attendant in a temple , similar to a neokoros.

According to one source the word was used in two senses. In the first sense, and depending in some part on a translation of the word, the zakoros is understood to have participated in activities within temples, to sweep and clean the temples and also to tend the sacrificial fire. In the second sense is the example of the courtesan of the goddess Aphrodite, named Phryne, who was referred to as a zakoros because of the splendour of her body.

In another source, Phryne is mentioned again, and this shows the word to be a person who is a cultic official, particularly from the 4th century BC and later, to refer especially to those involved with foreign cults.

Demetrios of Sphettos, who was involved in the buildings catalogued IG II^{2} 3187 and IG II^{2} 3188, and an otherwise unnamed son of Antiochus of Sphettos, are referred to as zakoroi.
