= Book burning at Ephesus =

Event in the New Testament

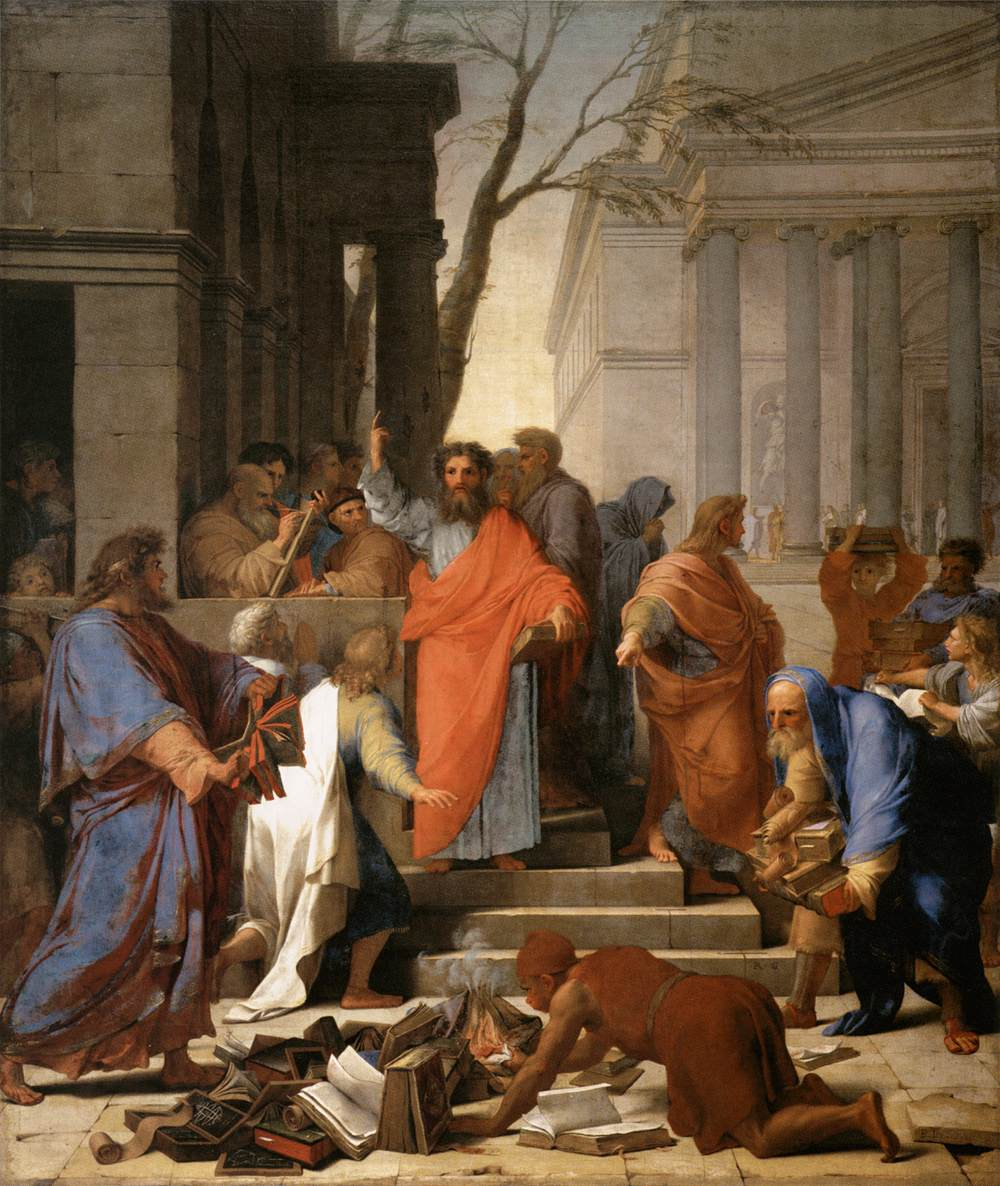
Eustache Le Sueur - The Preaching of St Paul at Ephesus, 1649. This painting depicts books with geometric figures, in response to Galileo Galilei, who said in 1623 that "the book of nature is written in mathematical figures".

The book burning at Ephesus is an event recorded in the Acts of the Apostles, where Christian converts at Ephesus, influenced by Paul the Apostle, burned their books of magic.

Acts 19 provides an account of the event:

Also many of those who were now believers came, confessing and divulging their practices. And a number of those who had practiced magic arts brought their books together and burned them in the sight of all. And they counted the value of them and found it came to fifty thousand pieces of silver. (Acts 19:18–19 ESV)

The pieces of silver could refer to the Greek drachma; this would come to a total value of approximately $6 million USD in present-day currency.

The following verse relates how "the word of the Lord continued to increase and prevail mightily" (Acts 19:20 ESV). Simon Kistemaker sees these things as closely connected: "The city of Ephesus purged itself of bad literature by burning magic books and became the depository of sacred literature that made up the canon of the New Testament."

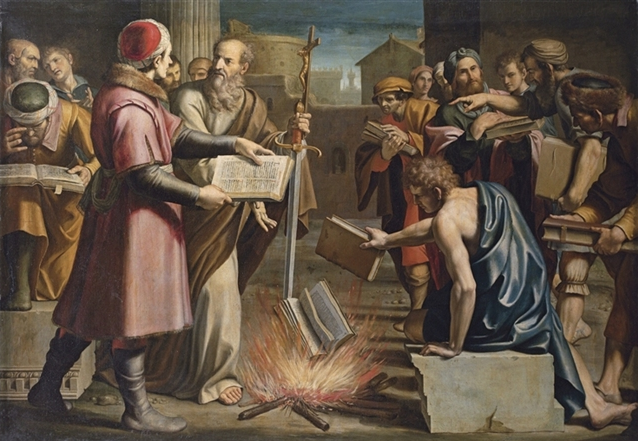
Lucio Massari, Saint Paul and the burning of pagan books at Ephesus, 1612.

== See also ==
- List of book-burning incidents
- Riot of the Ephesian silversmiths
