= Doctor Akakia =

Satirical essay by Voltaire

Doctor Akakia (French: Histoire du Docteur Akakia et du Natif de St Malo, 1752–1753) is a satirical book of a very biting nature by Voltaire, directed against pretentious pedants of science in the person of Maupertuis, the President of the Royal Academy of Sciences at Berlin. It so excited the anger of Frederick the Great, the patron of the Academy, that "[t]he Akakia was officially condemned in Prussia and burned by the public executioner on Christmas Eve of 1752".
