= Neokoros =

Sacral office in Ancient Greece

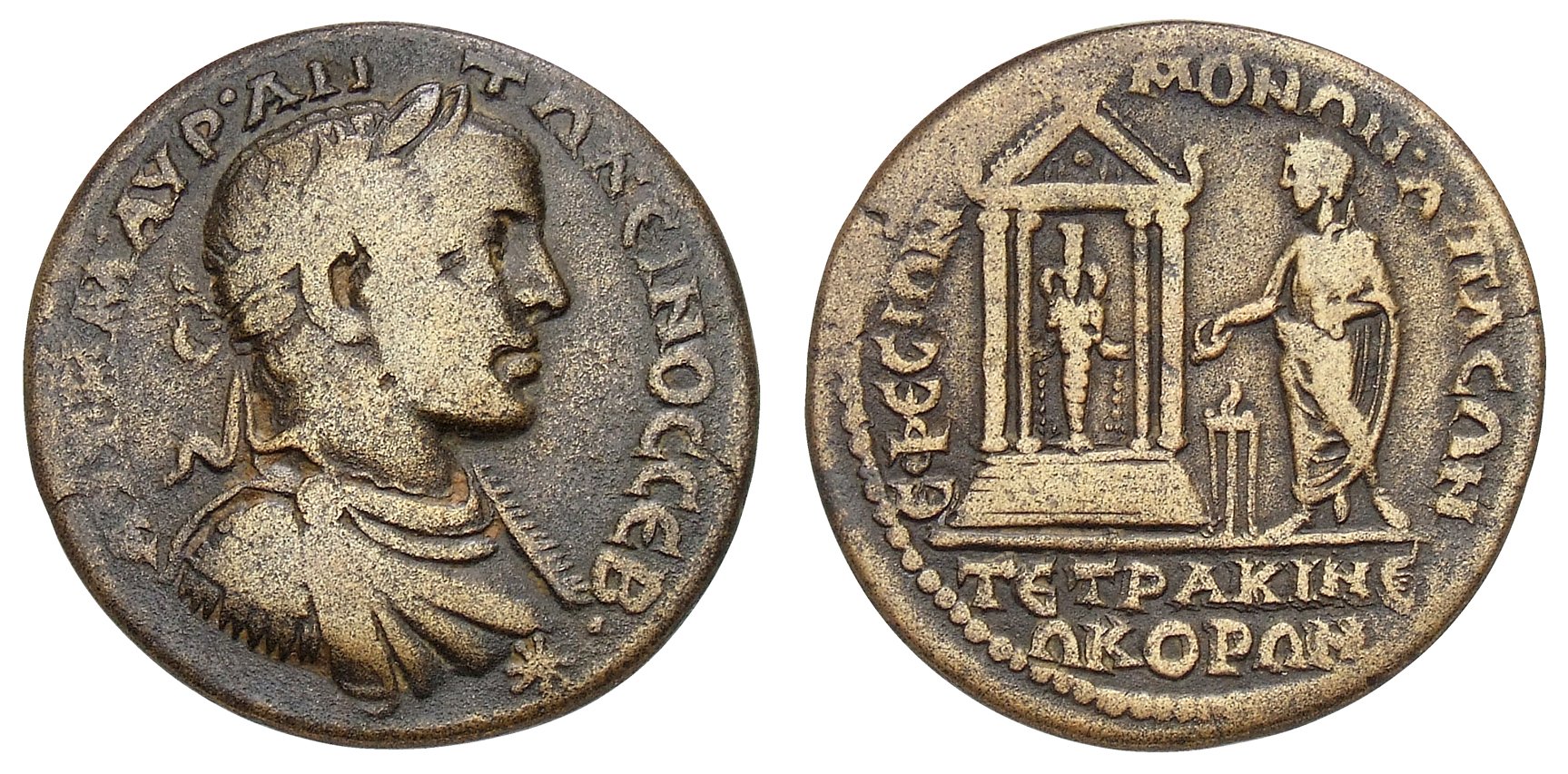
Roman-era civic coin of Ephesus, showing a bust of Emperor Elagabalus and priding itself of being "alone of all, four times neokoros" (MONΩN AΠΑCΩN TETΡAKI NEΩKOΡΩN)

Neokoros (Ancient Greek: νεωκόρος), plural neokoroi (νεωκόροι), was a sacral office in Ancient Greece associated with the custody of a temple. Under the Roman Empire, the neocorate became a distinction awarded to cities that had built temples to the emperors or had established cults of members of the Imperial family.

== Etymology ==
The term neokoros (νεωκόρος) probably derived from νεώς 'temple' + κορέω 'to sweep', thus literally a temple-sweeper. A number of variants are attested: ναοκόρος, νακόρος, ναυκόρος, νεοκόρος, νηοκόρος, or νειοκόρος. The term meant the custodian of a temple, analogous to a sacristan. Similar terms used instead of neokoros were ζάκορος (zakoros), ναοφύλαξ (naophylax), and νηοπόλος (neopolos).

== Temple office ==
In Classical Greece, the neokoroi belonged to the priestly class, but usually had a low status commensurate with their duties: in most known cases, they assumed auxiliary functions, although in some places, like Oropos or Kos, they could substitute for the actual temple priest, and on the sacred island of Delos the neocorate appears to have been a magistracy. Women could also be holders of a neocorate. The duration of the neocorate varied from place to place: in Delphi, the neokoroi were appointed for life, while at Delos at least one instance is known of a person who held the neocorate no fewer than 37 times.

Over time, especially in Asia, the neocorate became more important, as it was assumed by local magnates; its holders made donations to the temple and tried to commemorate their term of office. Neokoroi assumed epithets such as κράτιστος 'most mighty', while the title of 'chief neokoros' (ἀρχινεωκόρος) also appeared to distinguish the more senior members of the class.

== Honorific for cities ==
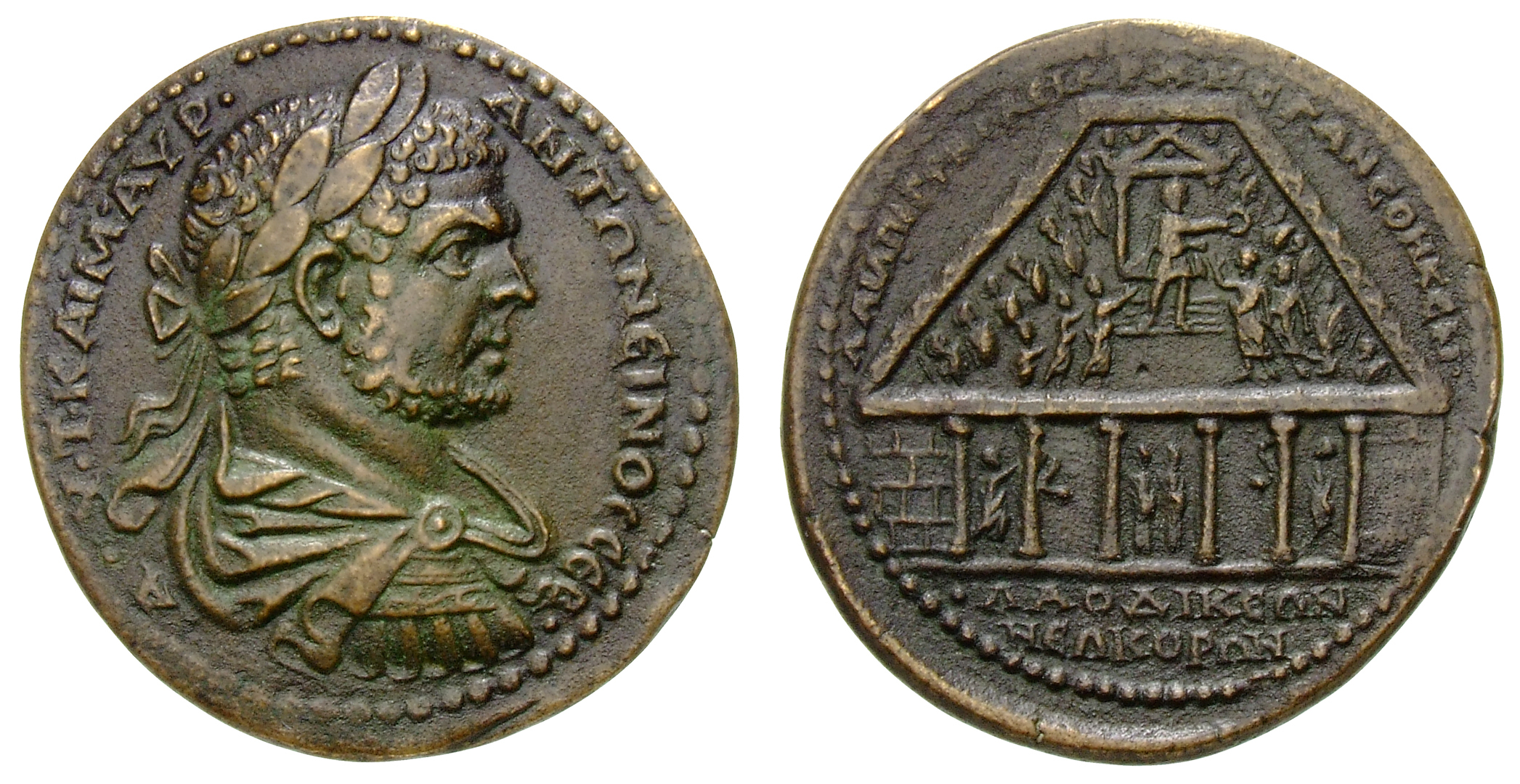
Roman-era civic coin of Laodicea on the Lycus, showing a bust of Emperor Caracalla and inscribed "of the Laodiceans, who are neokoroi" (ΛΑΟΔΙΚΕΩN NEΩKOΡΩN)

In the early Roman Empire, the title began to be used for entire cities, who thus were neokoroi of their patron deities, such as Ephesus with Artemis. This use was rare, however, and the neocorate is mostly associated with the Roman imperial cult. The Greek cities of the East were awarded the title of neokoros by the Roman Senate, with the consent of the emperor, in token of their having built an imperial cult temple recognized as of province-wide significance. As a highly prestigious title, cities vied for it, and the more wealthy cities sought and received the title multiple times, for temples dedicated to different emperors. Ephesus held the record, with four neocorates.

The title appeared on civic coinage, often with representations of the temple in question. There were approximately 30 cities holding a neocorate, concentrated in the province of Asia, but also in neighboring provinces of Asia Minor, the Levant, and the southern Balkans.

Awards became very liberal under the Severan dynasty, and apparently ceased after the reign of Gallienus (r. 260–268).

== Bibliography ==
- Burrell, Barbara (2004). Neokoroi: Greek Cities and Roman Emperors. Brill. ISBN 90-04-12578-7.
- Friesen, Steven J. (1993). Twice Neokoros: Ephesus, Asia & the Cult of the Flavian Imperial Family. Brill.
- Hanell, Krister (1935). "Neokoroi". Realencyclopädie der Classischen Altertumswissenschaft, Band XVI, Halbband 32, Mystagogos-Nereae (in German). Stuttgart: Alfred Druckenmüller. col. 2422–2428.
- Williams, Jonathan (2000). "Neokoros". In Cancik, Hubert; Schneider, Helmuth (eds.). Der neue Pauly: Enzyklopädie der Antike, Band 8, Mer-Op (in German). Stuttgart and Weimar: J. B. Metzler. p. 827. ISBN 3-476-01478-9.
