= Ernst Haenchen =

German Protestant theologian (1894–1975)

- Born: 10 December 1894; Czarnków
- Died: 30 April 1975 (aged 80); Münster
- Education: habilitation
- Alma mater: University of Tübingen
- Occupation: Theologian, university teacher
- Employer: University of Giessen; University of Münster
- Position held: dean

Ernst Haenchen (10 December 1894 – 30 April 1975) was a German Protestant theologian, professor, and Biblical scholar.

== Life ==
Ernst Haenchen spent his early years as the youngest child of District Secretary Carl Hermann Haenchen (1846–1897) and his wife Elfriede Haenchen, née Kubsch (1858–1939), together with his two siblings, Karl and Erika, in the district capital of the West Prussian county town Czarnikau. After his father's death, the family moved to Breslau, and then to Berlin in 1904. There, he attended the Joachimsthal Gymnasium from Easter 1905 until he graduated from high school.

At the outbreak of First World War, Ernst Haenchen was initially exempted from military service for health reasons, which enabled him to begin studying theology at the Friedrich-Wilhelm University of Berlin in the winter semester of 1914–15. There, he met Martin Dibelius, who was appointed to a professorship in Heidelberg during the summer semester.

His conscription into military service in May 1915 interrupted his studies, which had just begun. The loss of his right leg as a result of a war injury sustained in France in July 1918 had a significant impact on his future career. In August 1919, after undergoing 11 surgeries, he was discharged from the military hospital and resumed his studies in Berlin. In the winter semester of 1922–23, he transferred to the University of Tübingen, where he completed his studies in the summer semester of 1925. Since the regular doctoral process took too long for him, he entered an internal university competition with a thesis on formulations and discussions of the "Urfall" since Julius Müller. On 15 January 1926 he completed was awarded his Doctor in Theology (summa cum laude) at the University of Tübingen. He gave up his first pastorate following a severe fall as a result of his disability and decided to devote himself entirely to science. He returned to the University of Tübingen, where in 1926 he began teaching as an outside lecturer for Systematic theology.

In 1928, tuberculosis forced him to spend a total of two years in Davos, Switzerland. There he met his future wife Marguérite Fahrenberger (1905-1990), the daughter of Davos priest Johannes Fahrenberger. In 1933 Haenchen was appointed Full Professor of Systematic Theology at the University of Giessen, where he was elected dean of the Theological Faculty that same year.

On 24 March 1939 he moved to the University of Münster, again to the Chair of Systematic Theology. After the closure of the University of Münster in 1944, Ernst Haenchen resided in Davos, Switzerland, until 1948, in order to cure his tuberculosis. During this time, his first major academic work, a commentary on Acts of the Apostles, which made him soon known in theology circles. The 1956 first published work was quickly sold out and was updated and supplemented for the following editions by the author until his death.

Ernst Haenchen was briefly a member of the German Christians in 1933. But after a rally at the Berlin Sportpalast on 13 November 1933, where Reinhold Krause, chairman of the German Christians in Greater Berlin Act, declared a turning away of German Christianity from his Jewish roots, Haenchen left the movement. On 13 February 1939, however, he registered with the Nazi Party, a month before his appointment as a full professor at the University of Münster. As a consequence, in 1945 he lost his professorship in Münster again. A proper retirement did not take place until 1946. As an Emeritus, Haenchen continued teaching at the University of Münster for a number of years. Shortly before his death, he finished the text of his second, posthumously published masterpiece, a commentary on the Gospel according to John. Haenchen died in Münster on 30 April 1975.

Ernst Haenchen was the uncle of the photographer Karl Ludwig Haenchen.

== Festschrift ==
- Eltester, Walther, ed. (1964). Festschrift für Ernst Haenchen zu seinem 70. Geburtstag am 10. Dezember 1964. Zeitschrift für die neutestamentliche Wissenschaft und die Kunde der älteren Kirche / Beihefte. Vol. 30. Berlin: Töpelmann.

== Works ==
Theses

- Haenchen, Ernst (1926). Die Aufstellungen und Verhandlungen über den Urfall seit Julius Müller sind darzustellen und zu beurteilen (Dissertation, University of Tübingen).
- ——————— (1927). Die Frage nach der Gewissheit beim jungen Augustin (Habilitation, University of Tübingen).
- ——————— (1932). Die Frage nach der Gewissheit beim jungen Augustin. Tübinger Studien zur systematischen Theologie. Vol. 1. Stuttgart: W. Kohlhammer.

Books

- ——————— (1933). "Volk und Staat in der Lehre der Kirche". In Bornkamm, H. (ed.). Volk. Staat. Kirche. Ein Lehrgang der Theologischen Fakultät Gießen. Giessen: Verlag von Alfred Töpelmann.
- ——————— (1961). Die Botschaft des Thomas-Evangeliums. Theologische Bibliothek Töpelmann. Vol. 6. Berlin: Walter de Gruyter & Co.
- ——————— (1965). Gott und Mensch. Gesammelte Aufsätze. Tübingen: J. C. B. Mohr.
- ——————— (1966). Der Weg Jesu. Eine Erklärung des Markus-Evangeliums und der kanonischen Parallelen. Series: Sammlung Töpelmann. Vol. 2 / Series Theologische Hilfsbücher Vol. 6. (1968, 2nd revised and expanded ed.). Berlin: Walter de Gruyter & Co.
- ——————— (1968). Gesammelte Aufsätze. Die Bibel und wir. Vol. 2. Tübingen: Mohr Siebeck. ISBN 3-525-51634-7.
- ——————— (1969). Die Gnosis. Zeugnisse der Kirchenväter. Compiled with the collaboration of Ernst Haenchen and Martin Krause; translated and annotated by Werner Foerster. Vol. I. Zürich 1969, Nachdruck 1995. ISBN 3-7608-1105-1.
- ——————— (1977). Hahn, Ferdinand (ed.). Die Apostelgeschichte. Kritisch-exegetischer Kommentar über das Neue Testament / begr. von Heinrich August Wilhelm Meyer. Vol. 3 (16. ed., 7., Revised and expanded edition of this new interpretation ed.). Göttingen: Vandenhoeck & Ruprecht Verlag. ISBN 3-525-51634-7.
- ——————— (1979). Das Evangelium nach Thomas / möglichst wortgetreue Übers. Neu-Isenburg. ISBN 3-920947-27-4.
- ——————— (1980). Das Johannesevangelium – ein Kommentar. Aus den nachgelassenen Manuskripten hrsg. von U. Busse mit einem Vorwort von J. M. Robinson. Tübingen. ISBN 3-16-143102-2.
- ——————— (1984). John 1: A Commentary on the Gospel of John, Chapters 1-6. Hermeneia. Translated by Funk, Robert W.; Busse, Ulrich. Augsburg Fortress, Fortress Press. ISBN 9781506421315.
- ——————— (1984). John 2: A Commentary on the Gospel of John, Chapters 7-21. Hermeneia. Translated by Funk, Robert W.; Busse, Ulrich. Augsburg Fortress, Fortress Press. doi:10.2307/j.ctvb9368w. ISBN 9781506421315.

== Book reviews ==
- Neil, William (November 1972). "The Acts of the Apostles. By Ernst Haenchen. Blackwell, 1971. Pp. 737. £9". Scottish Journal of Theology. 25 (4): 475–476. doi:10.1017/S0036930600028696.
- Von Wahlde, Urban C. (1985). "Book Reviews: Ernst Haenchen, The Gospel of John. Hermeneia; Trans. Robert W. Funk; Philadelphia: Fortress, 1984. Vol. 1 Pp. xxx + 308. $34.95. Vol. 2 Pp. xviii + 366. $34.95". Biblical Theology Bulletin: Journal of Bible and Culture. 15 (3): 123–124. doi:10.1177/014610798501500312. S2CID 220813964.
