= Twelve Theses (leaflet) =

1933 anti-Jewish publication by German students

The Twelve Theses were issued in early April 1933 by Press and Propaganda Section of the German Student Union and called for German university students to purge the German language and literature of Jewish influence and to restore those aspects of German culture to their "pure" volkische traditions. The theses were posted on university campuses throughout Germany prior to the May 1933 book burnings.

== Text ==
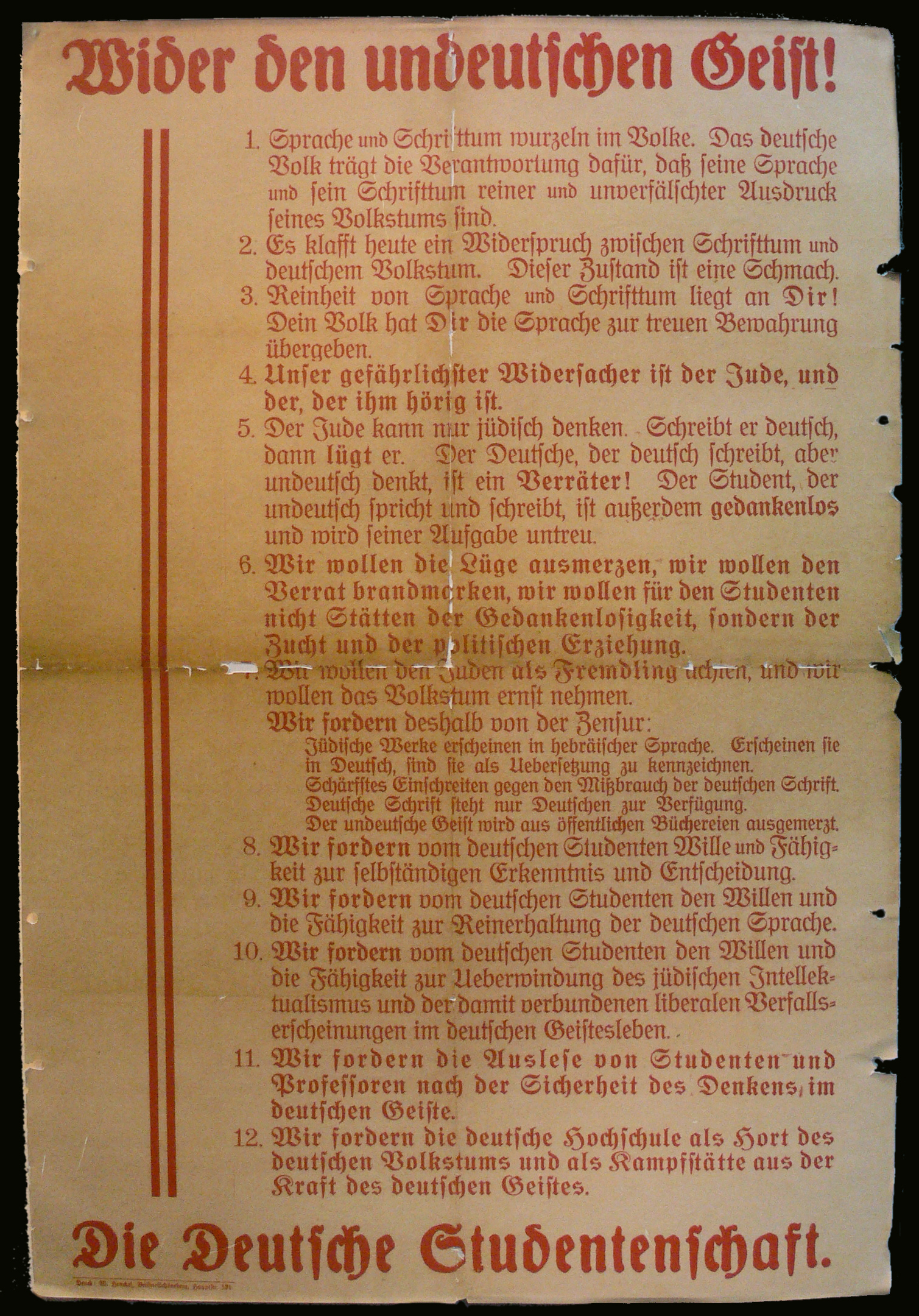
A leaflet of the Twelve Theses

The English text of the theses (as those are posted to the right) reads as follows:

The Twelve Theses
German text	English translation
Wider den undeutschen Geist!: 1. Sprache und Schrifttum wurzeln im Volke. Das deutsche Volk trägt die Verantwortung dafür, daß sein Schrifttum reiner und unverfälschter Ausdruck seines Volkstums sind.; 2. Es klafft heute ein Widerspruch zwischen Schrifttum und deutschem Volkstum. Dieser Zustand ist eine Schmach.; 3. Reinheit von Sprache und Schrifttum liegt an Dir! Dein Volk hat Dir die Sprache zur treuen Bewahrung übergeben.; 4. Unser gefährlichster Widersacher ist der Jude, und der, der ihm hörig ist.; 5. Der Jude kann nur jüdisch denken. Schreibt er deutsch, dann lügt er. Der Deutsche, der deutsch schreibt, aber undeutsch denkt, ist ein Verräter! Der Student, der undeutsch spricht und schreibt, ist außerdem gedankenlos und wird seiner Aufgabe untreu.; 6. Wir wollen die Lüge ausmerzen, wir wollen den Verrat brandmarken, wir wollen für den Studenten nicht Stätten der Gedankenlosigkeit, sondern der Zucht und der politischen Erziehung.; 7. Wir wollen den Juden als Fremdling achten, und wir wollen das Volkstum ernst nehmen.; Wir fordern deshalb von der Zensur: Jüdische Werke erscheinen in hebräischer Sprache. Erscheinen sie in Deutsch, sind sie als Uebersetzung zu kennzeichnen. Schärfstes Einschreiten gegen den Mißbrauch der deutschen Schrift. Deutsche Schrift steht nur Deutschen zur Verfügung. Der undeutsche Geist wird aus öffentlichen Büchereien ausgemerzt.: 8. Wir fordern vom deutschen Studenten Wille und Fähigkeit zur selbständigen Erkenntnis und Entscheidung.; 9. Wir fordern vom deutschen Studenten den Willen und die Fähigkeit zur Reinerhaltung der deutschen Sprache.; 10. Wir fordern vom deutschen Studenten den Willen und die Fähigkeit zur Ueberwindung des jüdischen Intellektualismus und der damit verbundenen liberalen Verfallserscheinungen im deutschen Geistesleben.; 11. Wir fordern die Auslese von Studenten und Professoren nach der Sicherheit des Denkens im deutschen Geiste.; 12. Wir fordern die deutsche Hochschule als Hort des deutschen Volkstums und als Kampfstätte aus der Kraft des deutschen Geistes.; Die Deutsche Studentenschaft.	Against the un-German spirit!: 1. Language and literature have their roots in the Volk. It is the German Volk's responsibility to assure that its language and literature are the pure and unadulterated expression of its Folk traditions.; 2. At present there is a chasm between literature and German tradition. This situation is a disgrace.; 3. Purity of language and literature is your responsibility! Your Folk has entrusted you with the duty of faithfully preserving your language.; 4. Our most dangerous enemy is the Jew and those who are his slaves.; 5. A Jew can only think Jewish. If he writes in German, he is lying. The German who writes in German, but thinks un-German, is a traitor! The student who speaks and writes un-German is, in addition, thoughtless and has abandoned his duties.; 6. We want to eradicate lies, we want to denounce treason, we want institutions of discipline and political education for us the students, not mindlessness.; 7. We want to regard the Jew as alien and we want to respect the traditions of the Folk.; Therefore, we demand of the censor: Jewish writings are to be published in Hebrew. If they appear in German, they must be identified as translations. Strongest actions against the abuse of the German script. German script is only available to Germans. The un-German spirit is to be eradicated from public libraries.: 8. We demand of the German students the desire and capability for independent knowledge and decisions.; 9. We demand of German students the desire and capability to maintain the purity of the German language.; 10. We demand of German students the desire and capability to overcome Jewish intellectualism and the resulting liberal decay in the German spirit.; 11. We demand the selection of students and professors in accordance with their reliability and commitment to the German spirit.; 12. We demand that German universities be a stronghold of the German Folk tradition and a battleground reflecting the power of the German mind.; The German Student Association.

== Commentary ==
1. While the theses targeted the "Jewish spirit" (jüdischer Geist) and books expressing this, it also attacked concepts that were "un-German" (undeutsch). It is not clear from the theses themselves whether this term is intended to be synonymous with "Jewishness".
2. The theses do not themselves expressly call for book burning.
3. Thesis 1 expressly implies that there should be no foreign literature in Germany, entailing a complete ban of all non-German literature, at least on works translated into German.
4. Theses 11 and 12 would reserve German universities exclusively to German students and professors, devoid of foreign elements.

== See also ==
- Nazi book burnings
- National Socialist Program
- Hutu Ten Commandments
