= Nazi book burnings =

1930s campaign to destroy prohibited literature and research in Nazi Germany and Austria

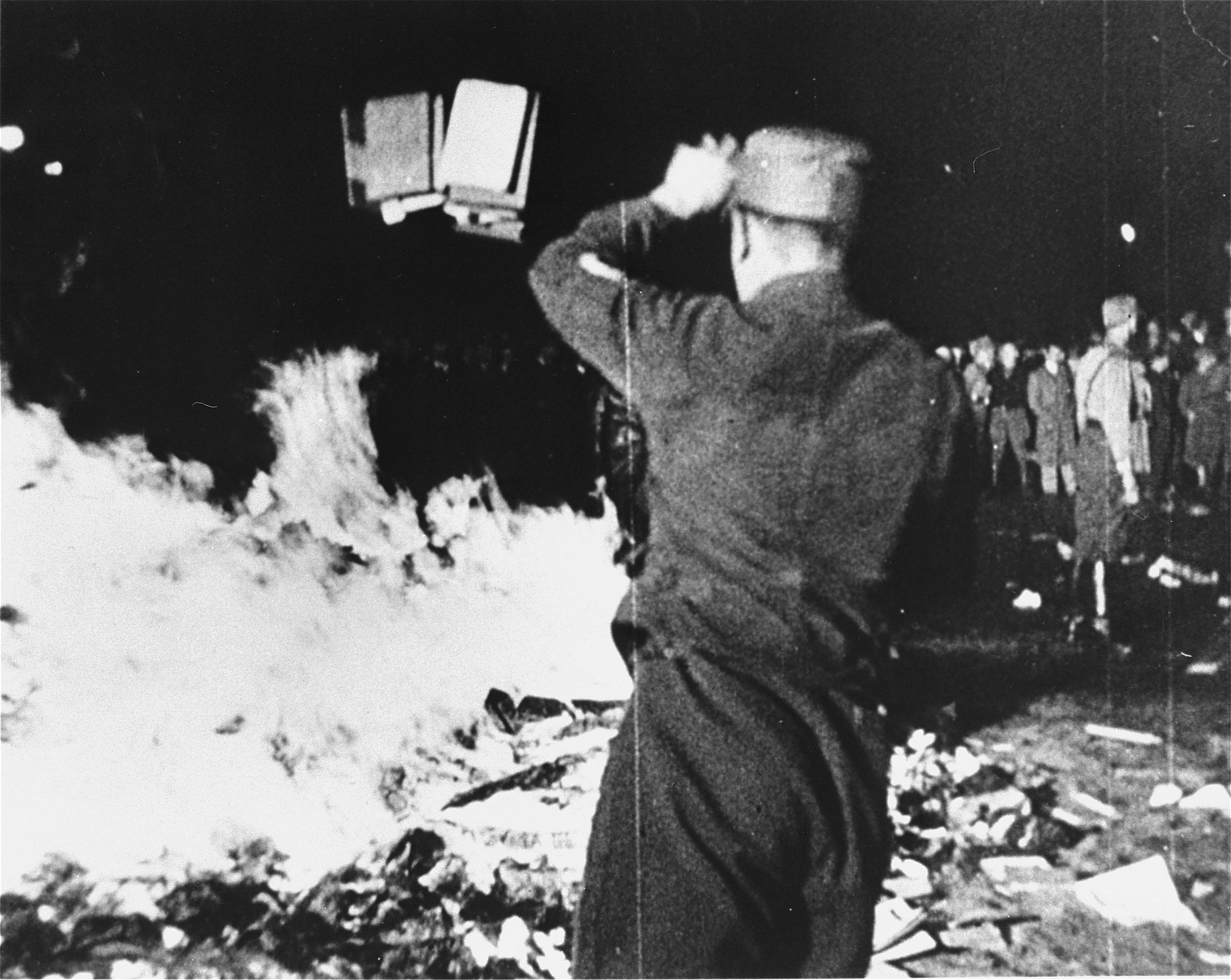
Book burning in Berlin, 10 May 1933

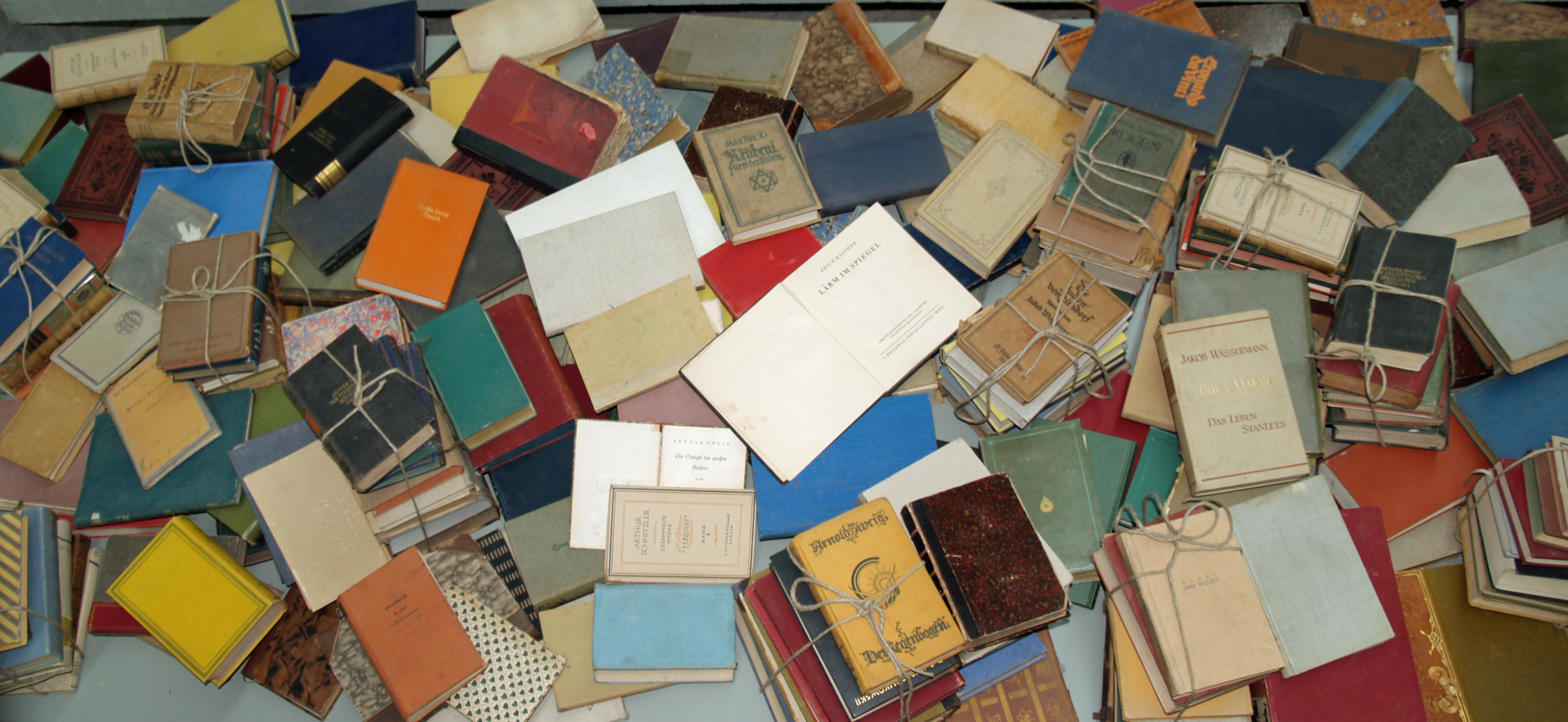
Examples of books burned by the Nazis on display at Yad Vashem

The Nazi book burnings were a campaign conducted by the German Student Union (German: Deutsche Studentenschaft, DSt) to ceremonially burn books in Nazi Germany and Austria in the 1930s. The books targeted for burning were those viewed as being subversive or as representing ideologies opposed to Nazism. These included books written by Jewish, half-Jewish, communist, socialist, anarchist, liberal, pacifist, and sexologist authors among others. The initial books burned were those of Karl Marx and Karl Kautsky, but the burned books came to include other authors, including the works of Albert Einstein, Helen Keller, H.G. Wells, and effectively any book incompatible with Nazi ideology. The first burning consisted mainly of LGBTQ books from the Institut für Sexualwissenschaft (Institute of Sexual Research), founded by the pioneering Jewish sexologist Magnus Hirschfeld as the first medical center devoted to the study of gender and sexuality. In a campaign of cultural genocide, books were also burned en masse by the Nazis in occupied territories as well, such as in Poland.

== Precursors ==
In Dresden, on March 7 and 8, 1933, the Sturmabteilung raided a book store and a newspaper editorial office linked to the SPD. They burned magazines, newspapers, fiction, works by banned authors, as well as leaflets and files.

== Student Campaign ==
=== Announcement ===
On April 8, 1933, the Main Office for Press and Propaganda of the German Student Union (DSt) proclaimed a nationwide "Action against the Un-German Spirit", which was to climax in a literary purge or "cleansing" ("Säuberung") by fire. According to historian Karl Dietrich Bracher:

[T]he exclusion of "Left", democratic, and Jewish literature took precedence over everything else. The black-lists ... ranged from Bebel, Bernstein, Preuss, and Rathenau through Einstein, Freud, Brecht, Brod, Döblin, Kaiser, the Mann brothers, Zweig, Plievier, Ossietzky, Remarque, Schnitzler, and Tucholsky, to Barlach, Bergengruen, Broch, Hoffmannsthal, Kästner, Kasack, Kesten, Kraus, Lasker-Schüler, Unruh, Werfel, Zuckmayer, and Hesse. The catalogue went back far enough to include literature from Heine and Marx to Kafka.

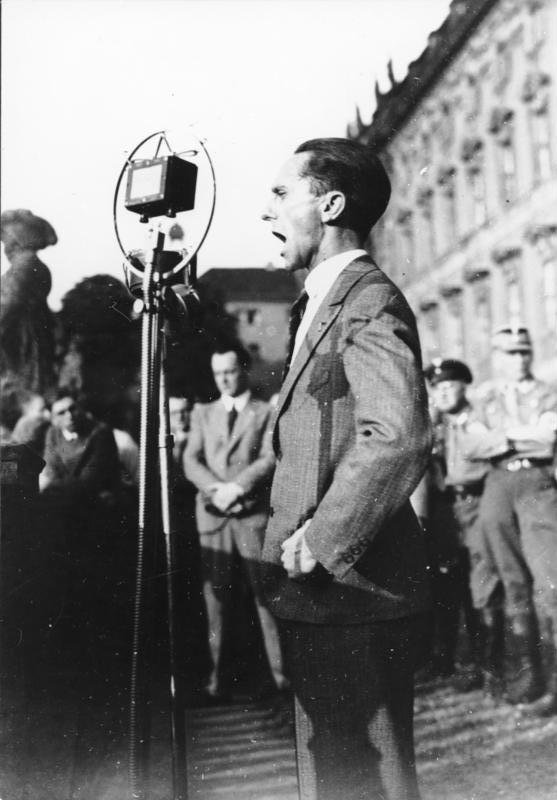
Joseph Goebbels speaking at a political rally against the Lausanne Conference (1932)

Local chapters were to supply the press with releases and commissioned articles, sponsor well-known Nazis to speak at public gatherings, and negotiate for radio broadcast time. The DSt had contacted an official from the Propaganda Ministry to request support for their campaign, including having Propaganda Minister Josef Goebbels be the main speaker at the event in Berlin. Because Goebbels had studied under several Jewish professors, and had, in the past, praised them despite his avowed antisemitism, he was afraid that speaking at the book burning would cause these past remarks to be dug up by his enemies. As a result, he did not formally accept the invitation to speak – despite his having been listed in the advance publicity – until the last moment.

On the same day, the Student Union published the "Twelve Theses", a title chosen to be evocative of two events in German history: Martin Luther's burning of a papal bull when he posted his Ninety-five Theses in 1517, and the burning of a handful of items, including 11 books, at the 1817 Wartburg Festival on the 300th anniversary of Luther's burning of the bull. This was, however, a false comparison, as the "book burnings" at those historic events were not acts of censorship, nor destructive of other people's property, but purely symbolic protests, destroying only one individual document of each title, for a grand total of 12 individual documents, without any attempt to suppress their content, whereas the Student Union burned tens of thousands of volumes, all they could find from a list comprising around 4000 titles.

The "Twelve Theses" called for a "pure" national language and culture. Placards publicized the theses, which attacked "Jewish intellectualism", asserted the need to "purify" German language and literature, and demanded that universities be centres of German nationalism. The students described the action as a “response to a worldwide Jewish smear campaign against Germany and an affirmation of traditional German values.”

=== The burnings start ===
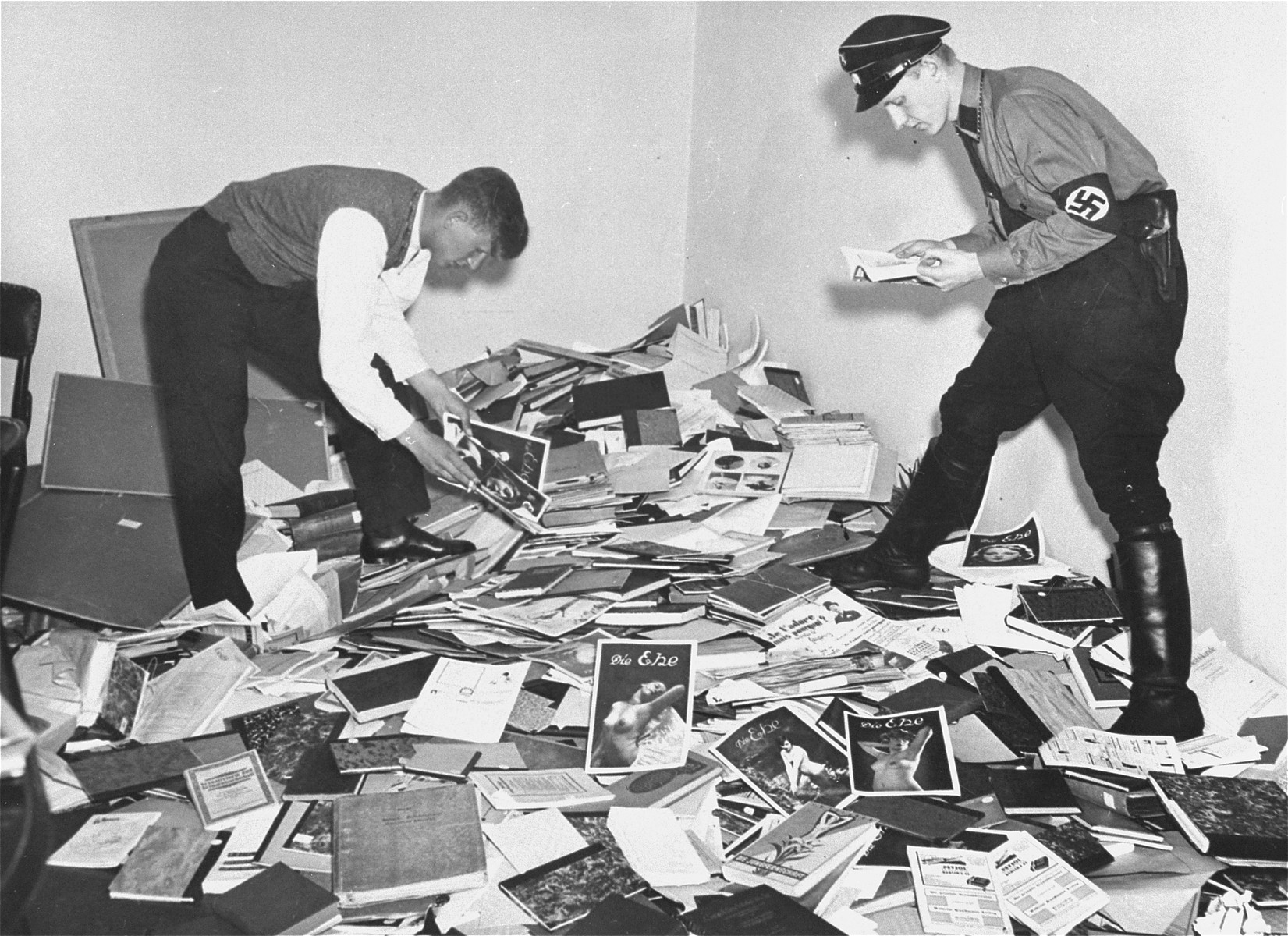
A German student and a Nazi SS member plunder the library of Dr. Magnus Hirschfeld, Director of the Institute for Sexual Research in Berlin.

Nazi students unloading looted and confiscated books for the book burning on the Opernplatz.

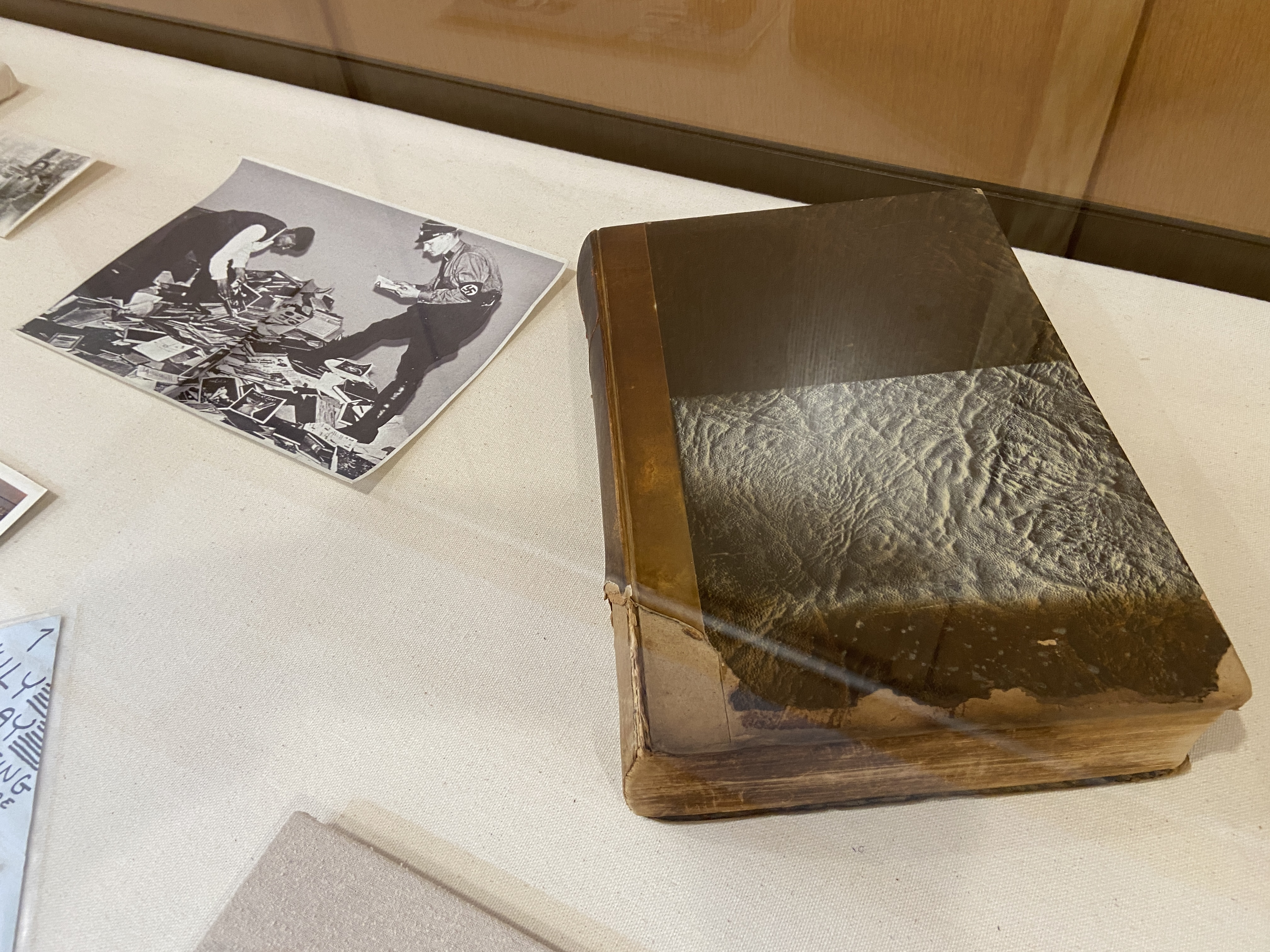
Burnt remains of a book-burning target, Le Marquis de Sade et Son Temps (Marquis de Sade and his times). Part of the Jean-Nickolaus Tretter Collection

On 6 May 1933, the Berlin chapter of the German Student Union made an organised attack on Magnus Hirschfeld's Institut für Sexualwissenschaft (Institute of Sex Research).

The institute's library included many thousands of volumes on sexuality and other matters relating to its work. The institute also had a substantial collection of objects, photographs and documents including research, biographies and patient records. Estimates of total size vary. The looted material was witnessed by the international press being loaded on to a truck and, on 10 May, it was taken to the Bebelplatz square at the State Opera (colloquially known as Opernplatz), and burned along with volumes from elsewhere.

A total of over 25,000 volumes of "un-German" books were burned, thereby ushering in an era of uncompromising state censorship. In many other university towns, nationalist students marched in torch lit parades against the "un-German" spirit. The scripted rituals of this night called for high Nazi officials, professors, rectors, and student leaders to address the participants and spectators. At the meeting places, students threw the pillaged, banned books into the bonfires with a great joyous ceremony that included live music, singing, "fire oaths," and incantations. In Berlin, some 40,000 people heard Joseph Goebbels deliver an address: "No to decadence and moral corruption!" Goebbels enjoined the crowd. "Yes to decency and morality in family and state! I consign to the flames the writings of Heinrich Mann, Ernst Glaeser, Erich Kästner."

The era of extreme Jewish intellectualism is now at an end. The breakthrough of the German revolution has again cleared the way on the German path...The future German man will not just be a man of books, but a man of character. It is to this end that we want to educate you. As a young person, to already have the courage to face the pitiless glare, to overcome the fear of death, and to regain respect for death – this is the task of this young generation. And thus you do well in this midnight hour to commit to the flames the evil spirit of the past. This is a strong, great and symbolic deed – a deed which should document the following for the world to know – Here the intellectual foundation of the November Republic is sinking to the ground, but from this wreckage the phoenix of a new spirit will triumphantly rise.

— Joseph Goebbels, Speech to the students in Berlin

In his speech – which was broadcast on the radio – Goebbels' referred to the authors whose books were being burned as "Intellectual filth" and "Jewish asphalt literati".

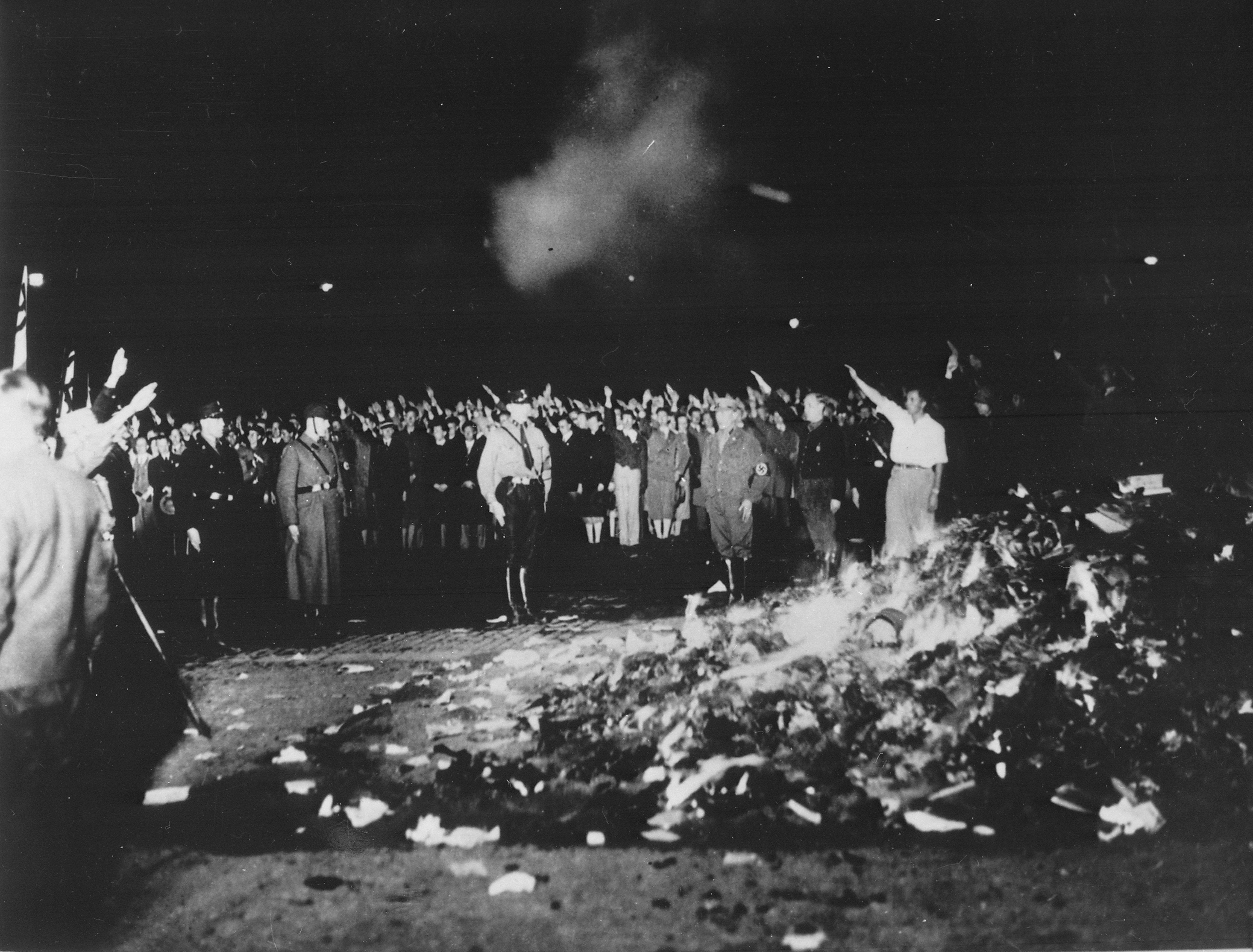
Opernplatz, Berlin book burnings

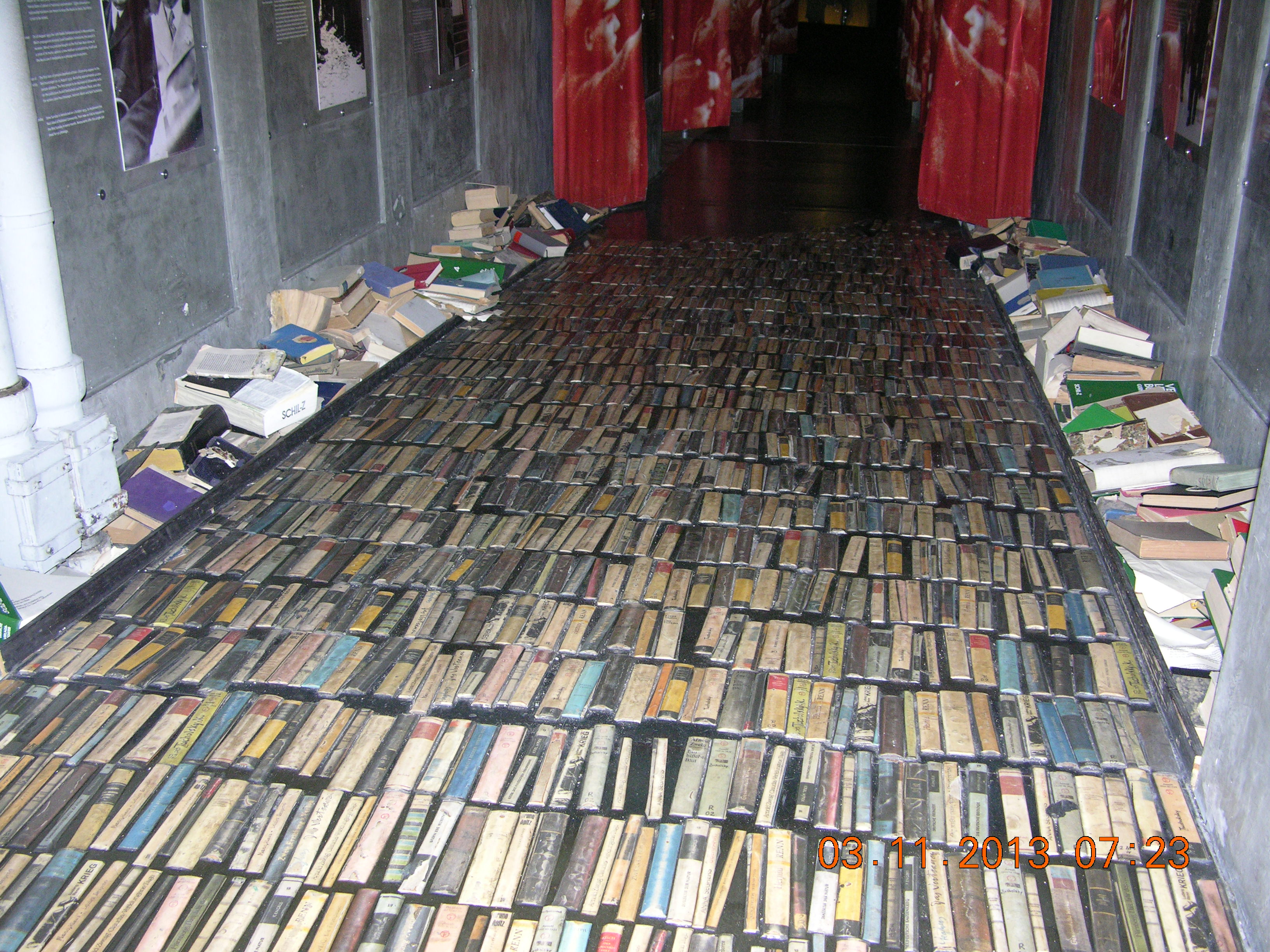
Books built into the floor at the museum Story of Berlin

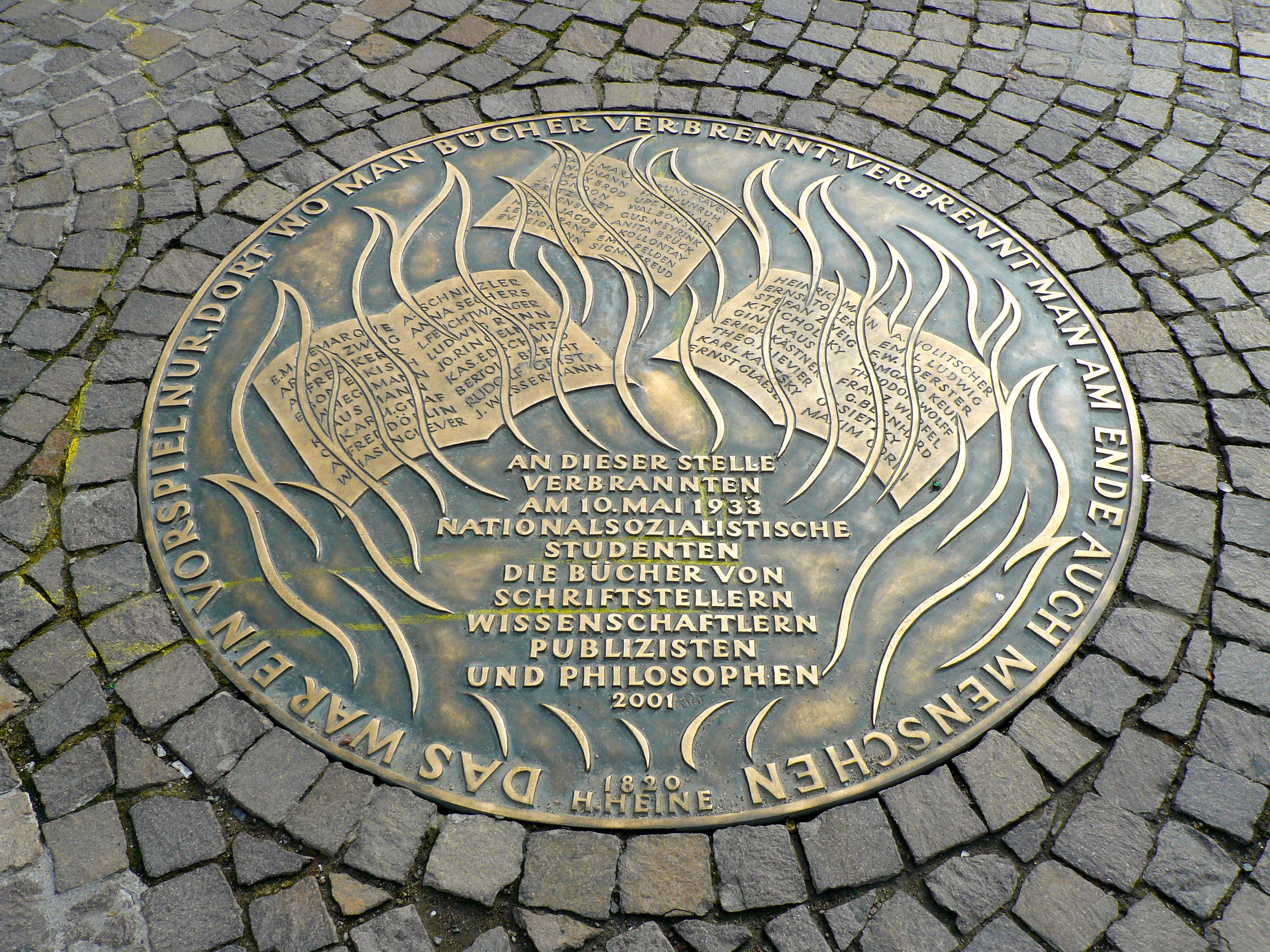
Memorial for book burning in 1933; on the ground of Römerberg Square in front of Frankfurt city hall, Hesse, Germany

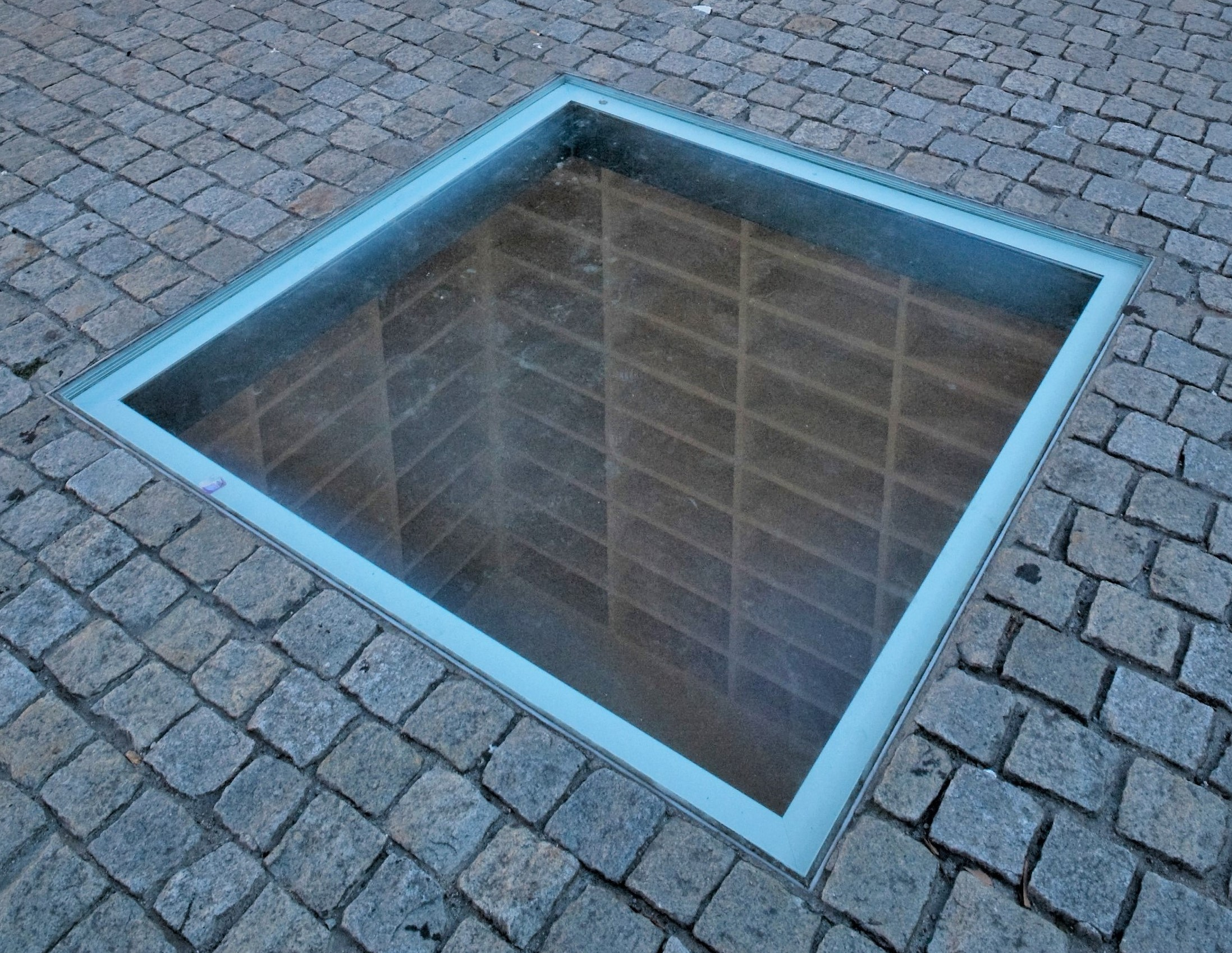
The Empty Library at the Bebelplatz (former Opernplatz) in Berlin, designed by Micha Ullman

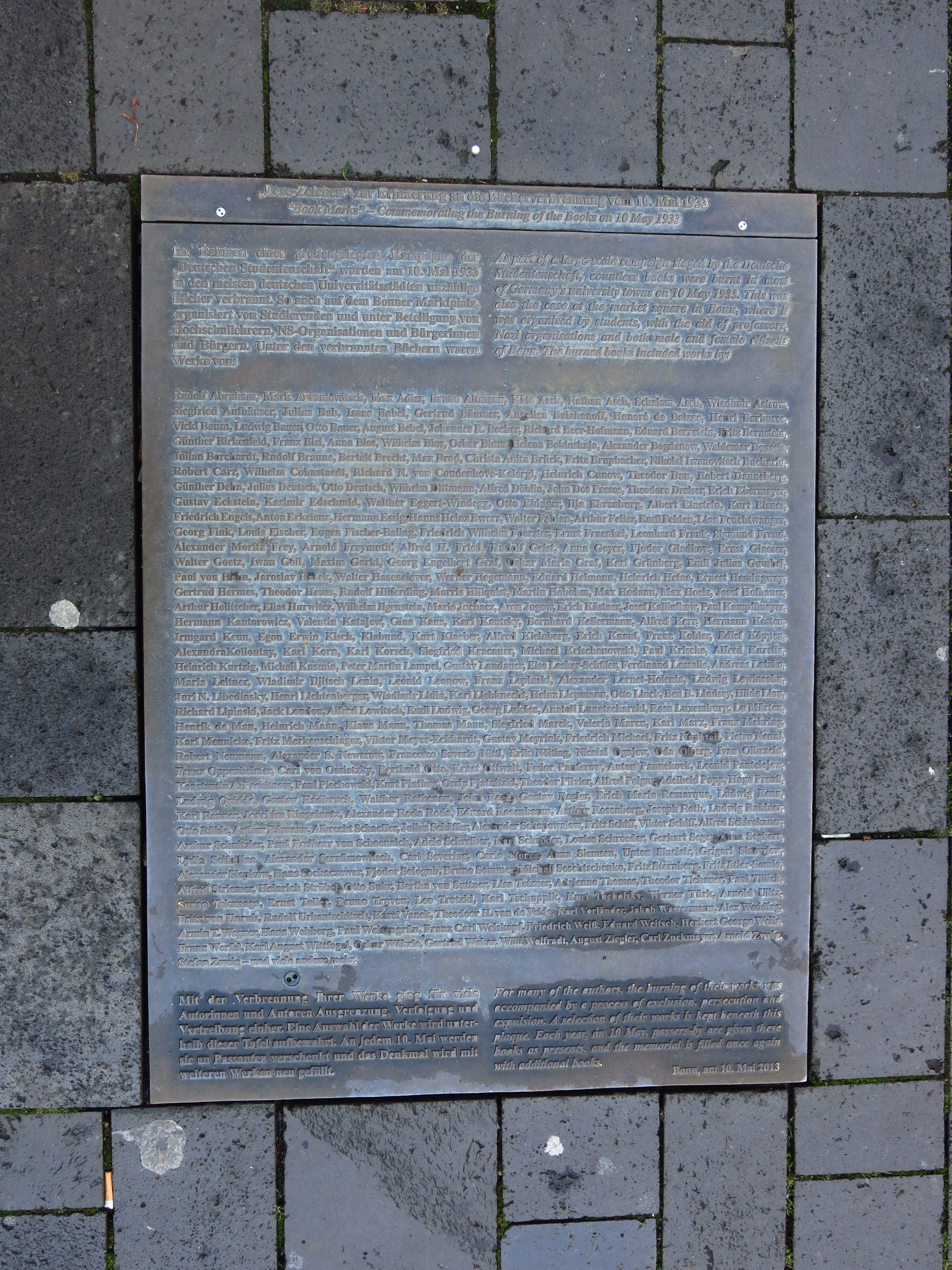
"Lese-Zeichen" ("Book marks"), commemorating the burning of the books on 10 May 1933 at the Bonner Marketplace

Not all book burnings took place on 10 May as the German Student Union had planned. Some were postponed a few days because of rain. Others, based on local chapter preference, took place on 21 June, the summer solstice, a traditional date of celebration. Nonetheless, in thirty four university towns across Germany the "Action against the Un-German Spirit" was a success, enlisting widespread newspaper coverage. And in some places, notably Berlin, radio broadcasts brought the speeches, songs, and ceremonial incantations "live" to countless German listeners.

All of these types of literature, as described by the Nazis, were to be banned:

- The works of traitors, emigrants and authors from foreign countries who believe they can attack and denigrate the new Germany (H. G. Wells, Romain Rolland);
- The literature of Marxism, Communism and Bolshevism;
- Pacifist literature;
- Literature with liberal, democratic tendencies and attitudes, and writings supporting the Weimar Republic (Walther Rathenau, Heinrich Mann, Thomas Mann);
- All historical writings whose purpose is to denigrate the origin, the spirit and the culture of the German Volk, or to dissolve the racial and structural order of the Volk, or that denies the force and importance of leading historical figures in favor of egalitarianism and the masses, and which seeks to drag them through the mud (Emil Ludwig);
- Writings of a philosophical and social nature whose content deals with the false scientific enlightenment of primitive Darwinism and Monism (Ernst Haeckel);
- Books that advocate "art" which is decadent, bloodless, or purely constructivist (George Grosz, Otto Dix, Bauhaus, Felix Mendelssohn);
- Writings on sexuality and sexual education which serve the egocentric pleasure of the individual and thus, completely destroy the principles of race and Volk (Magnus Hirschfeld);
- The decadent, destructive and Volk-damaging writings of "Asphalt and Civilization" literati: (Oskar Maria Graf, Heinrich Mann, Stefan Zweig, Jakob Wassermann, Franz Blei);
- Literature by Jewish authors, regardless of the field;
- Popular entertainment literature that depicts life and life's goals in a superficial, unrealistic and sickly sweet manner, based on a bourgeois or upper class view of life;
- Patriotic kitsch in literature.
- Pornography and explicit literature
- All books degrading German purity.

Many German students took part in the Nazi book burning campaign. They were known as Deutsche Studentenschaft, and when they ran out of books in their own libraries they turned to independent bookstores. Libraries were asked to stock their shelves with material that stood up to Hitler's standards, and destroy anything that did not.

=== Cultural genocide in occupied territories ===
Among the Nazi crimes against the Polish nation was a campaign of cultural genocide that included the burning of millions of books, resulting in the destruction of an estimated 80% of all school libraries, and three-quarters of all scientific libraries in the country. The Nazis also seized many books from Jewish communities in Eastern Europe. They intended to keep and display a few rare and ancient books in a museum on Judaism after the Final Solution was successfully completed.

== Persecuted authors ==
Among the other German-speaking authors whose books student leaders burned were:

Vicki Baum, Walter Benjamin, Ernst Bloch, Bertolt Brecht, Franz Boas, Albert Einstein, Friedrich Engels, Etta Federn, Lion Feuchtwanger, Marieluise Fleißer, Leonhard Frank, Sigmund Freud, Iwan Goll, Jaroslav Hašek, Werner Hegemann, Hermann Hesse, Ödön von Horvath, Heinrich Eduard Jacob, Franz Kafka, Georg Kaiser, Alfred Kerr, Egon Kisch, Siegfried Kracauer, Theodor Lessing, Alexander Lernet-Holenia, Karl Liebknecht, Georg Lukács, Rosa Luxemburg, Klaus Mann, Thomas Mann, Ludwig Marcuse, Karl Marx, Robert Musil, Carl von Ossietzky, Erwin Piscator, Alfred Polgar, Gertrud von Puttkamer, Erich Maria Remarque, Ludwig Renn, Joachim Ringelnatz, Joseph Roth, Nelly Sachs, Felix Salten, Anna Seghers, Abraham Nahum Stencl, Carl Sternheim, Bertha von Suttner, Ernst Toller, Frank Wedekind, Franz Werfel, Grete Weiskopf, and Arnold Zweig.

Not only German-speaking authors were burned, but also American writers such as John Dos Passos, Ernest Hemingway, Helen Keller, Jack London, Upton Sinclair, and Margaret Sanger, as well as Russian authors including Isaac Babel, Ilya Ehrenburg, Maxim Gorki, Vladimir Lenin, Vladimir Majakovskij and Leon Trotsky.

The burning of the books represents a culmination of the persecution of those authors whose oral or written opinions were opposed to Nazi ideology. Many artists, writers and scientists were banned from working and publication. Their works could no longer be found in libraries or in the curricula of schools or universities. Some of them were driven to exile (such as Albert Einstein, Sigmund Freud, Magnus Hirschfeld, Walter Mehring, and Arnold Zweig); others were deprived of their citizenship (for example, Ernst Toller and Kurt Tucholsky) or forced into a self-imposed exile from society (e.g., Erich Kästner). For other writers the Nazi persecutions ended in death. Some of them died in concentration camps, due to the consequences of the conditions of imprisonment, or were executed (like Carl von Ossietzky, Erich Mühsam, Gertrud Kolmar, Jakob van Hoddis, Paul Kornfeld, Arno Nadel, Georg Hermann, Theodor Wolff, Adam Kuckhoff, Friedrich Reck-Malleczewen, and Rudolf Hilferding). Exiled authors despaired and died by suicide, for example: Walter Hasenclever, Ernst Weiss, Carl Einstein, Walter Benjamin, Ernst Toller, and Stefan Zweig.

Where they burn books, they will burn people too in the end.

— Heinrich Heine (1823) (Note: Dort wo man Bücher verbrennt, verbrennt man auch am Ende Menschen.)
(Heine's books were among those burned.)

== Responses ==
Helen Keller published an "Open Letter to German Students", in which she wrote: "You may burn my books and the books of the best minds in Europe, but the ideas those books contain have passed through millions of channels and will go on."

=== German Freedom Library ===
On 10 May 1934, one year after the mass book burnings, the German Freedom Library founded by Alfred Kantorowicz was opened to assemble copies of the books that had been destroyed. Because of the shift in political power and the blatant control and censorship demonstrated by the Nazi Party, 1933 saw a “mass exodus of German writers, artists, and intellectuals". They went into exile in America, England, and France. On 10 May 1934, those writers in exile in France came together and established the Library of the Burned Books where all the works that had been banned, burned, censored, and destroyed were collected.

Alfred Kantorowicz, the author of the 1944 article Library of the Burned Books, was one of the key leaders instrumental in creating this library. In his article, he explains first-hand how the library came to be, and how it was finally destroyed. The library not only housed those books banned by the Nazis, the more important mission was to be the “center of intellectual anti-Nazi activities”. In addition, it had extensive archives “on the history of Nazism and the anti-Nazi fight in all its forms”. After the French surrender, the Nazis were virtually in control in France so the French government closed down the library and anyone associated was imprisoned or sent to concentration camps. Once the Nazis occupied Paris, the library and archives were turned over and that was the end of the Library.

In Kantorowicz's words, “the real significance of the Library was not confined to its material existence. When we inaugurated it, we wanted to make that day of shame a day of glory for literature and for freedom of thought which no tyrant could kill by fire. And furthermore, by this symbolic action, we wanted to awaken Europe to the dangers which threatened its spiritual as well as its material existence.”

=== American Library of Nazi Banned Books ===
A similar library, modeled after one in Paris, was opened at the Brooklyn Jewish Center in Brooklyn, New York on 15 November 1934. There were speeches given by Rev. Dr. Israel H. Levinthal, Rabbi of the Jewish Center, and the library chairman Rabbi Louis Hammer. An inaugural dinner dedicated to Albert Einstein and Heinz Liepmann was held on December 22, 1934.

The library had as its aim to "gather as many books as can be secured by authors whose books were burned by the Nazi Government at the notable bonfire on 10 May 1933. Also included were general titles relating to "general Jewish interest, in English, Hebrew and Yiddish." Among the authors whose books were available upon the library's opening were Albert Einstein, Maxim Gorki, Helen Keller, Sigmund Freud, Thomas Mann, and many others. Unlike the Paris library, the American library did not have any collection of books relating to Nazi ideology, or events or individuals in Nazi Germany.

The library was a strong advocate for the cause of Zionism, the Jewish national movement for a Jewish homeland in Palestine. To the minds of those in charge of the library, the Nazi book burnings represented "proof of [the] urgency" of Zionist affairs. Rabbi Stephen Wise, who spoke at the inaugural dinner, had led a protest at Madison Square Garden on the day of the book burning, and was an advocate of the Zionist movement. Thomas Mann, whose books were part of the library's collection, is quoted as saying that "what happened in Germany convinced me more and more of the value of Zionism for the Jew".

The American Library of Nazi Banned Books remained in place until the Brooklyn Jewish Center closed in the 1970s. Its collection was then donated to the Jewish Theological Seminary of America in New York City.

== Allied censorship during de-Nazification ==
In 1946, the Allied occupation authorities drew up a list of over 30,000 titles, ranging from school books to poetry and including works by such authors as von Clausewitz. Millions of copies of these books were confiscated and destroyed. A representative of the Military Directorate admitted that the order in principle was no different from the Nazi book burnings. However "most observers condemned the order as a piece of unenforceable foolishness".

Artworks were under the same censorship as other media;

all collections of works of art related or dedicated to the perpetuation of German militarism or Nazism will be closed permanently and taken into custody.

The directives were very broadly interpreted, leading to the destruction of thousands of paintings and thousands more were shipped to deposits in the US. Those confiscated paintings still surviving in US custody, As of 2007, include, for example, a painting "depicting a couple of middle aged women talking in a sunlit street in a small town".

== Memorials ==
A memorial to the book burnings stands at Bebelplatz in Berlin. The work, titled The Empty Library and created by Israeli artist Micha Ullman in 1995, consists of an underground room filled with empty bookshelves, visible through a glass pane set into the square. It marks the site where thousands of books were burned on 10 May 1933. Two bronze plaques are also set into the pavement at Bebelplatz near the memorial. They bear Heinrich Heine’s warning from 1820: Where they burn books, in the end they will also burn people.

Another major memorial is The Blacklist in Munich, created by Arnold Dreyblatt and inaugurated in 2021 at Königsplatz. It presents the names of authors whose works were banned or targeted for destruction in 1933.

Fighting the Fires of Hate: America and the Nazi Book Burnings was a traveling exhibition that was produced by the United States Holocaust Memorial Museum. In 2014 the exhibition was displayed in West Fargo, North Dakota; Dallas, Texas; and Missoula, Montana.

== In popular culture ==
The 1989 film Indiana Jones and the Last Crusade portrays a fictional Nazi book-burning rally in Berlin. Set at the Institute of Aryan Culture in 1938, the event is attended by Adolf Hitler himself, and symbolizes the ideological opposition between Indiana Jones and his enemies, the Nazis.

== See also ==
- Books in Germany
- Degenerate art
- Denazification
- Wolfgang Herrmann, the librarian who created the original blacklist of books
- List of authors banned in Nazi Germany
- List of book-burning incidents
