= The Empty Library =

Memorial in the centre of Berlin, Germany

Coordinates: 52°30′59″N 13°23′38″E

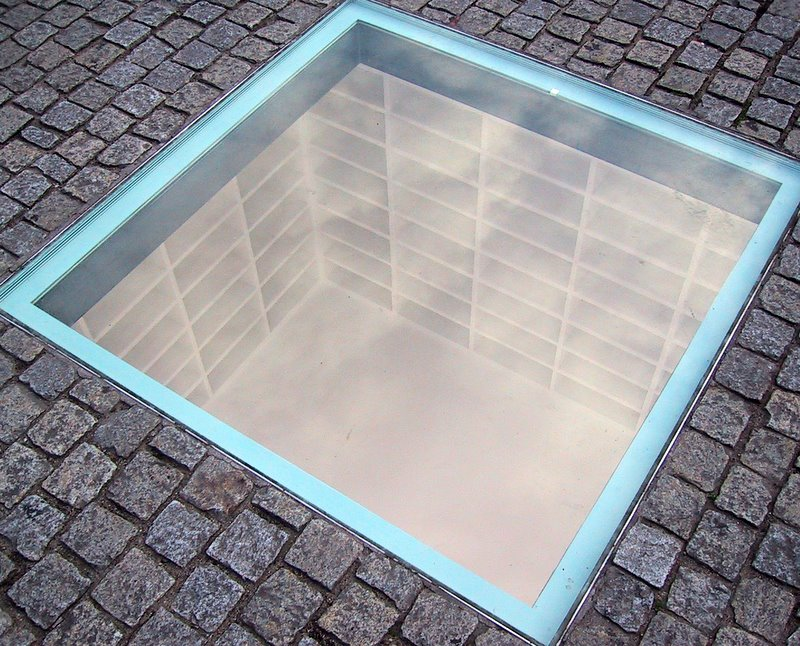
The Empty Library (1995) by Micha Ullman

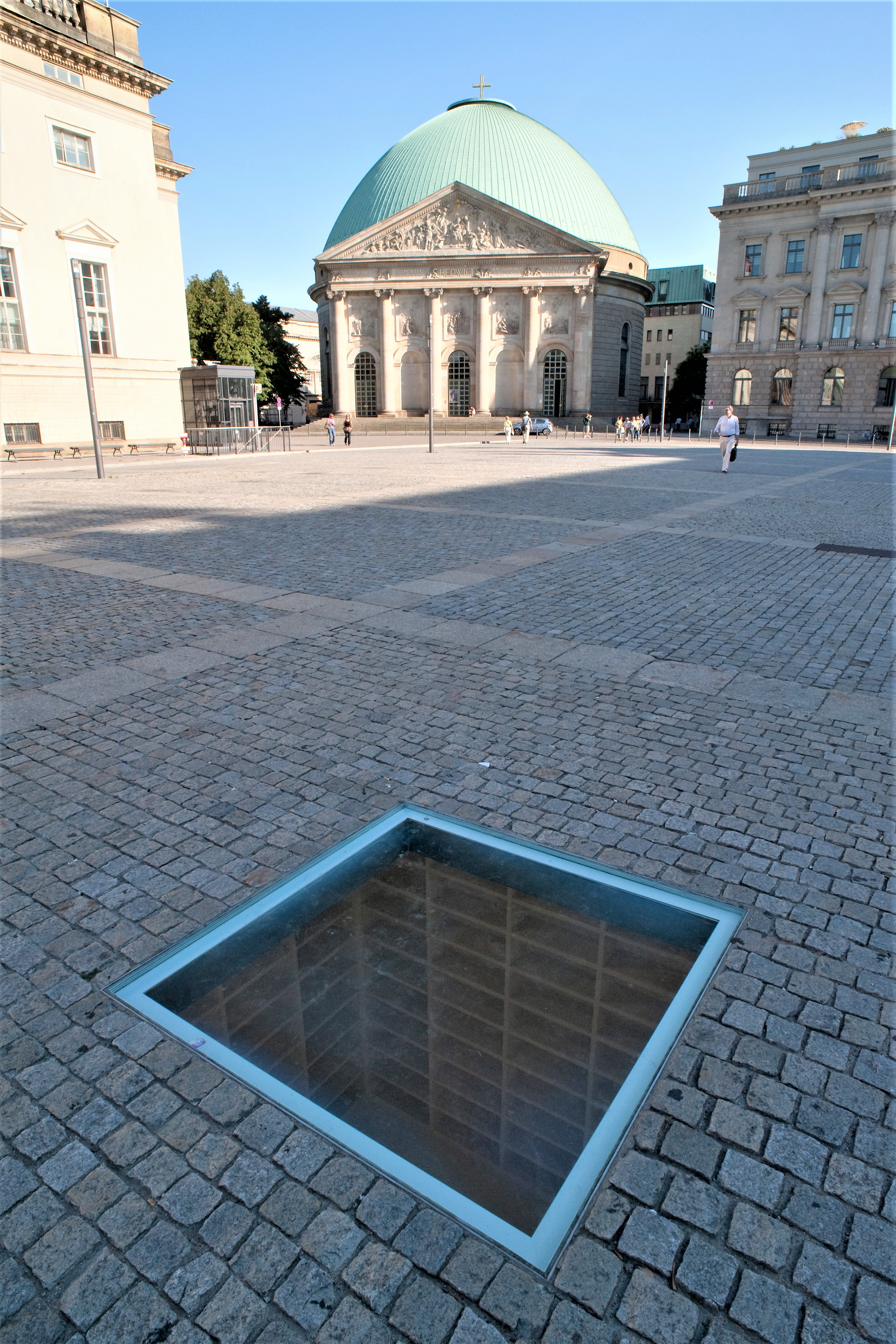
The memorial, with St. Hedwig's Cathedral behind

The Empty Library (1995), also known as Bibliothek or simply Library, is a public memorial by Israeli sculptor Micha Ullman dedicated to the remembrance of the Nazi book burnings that took place in the Bebelplatz in Berlin, Germany on May 10, 1933. The memorial is set into the cobblestones of the plaza and contains a collection of empty subterranean bookcases.

It is located in the centre of Berlin next to the Unter den Linden. The memorial commemorates 10 May 1933, when students of the National Socialist Student Union and many professors of the Friedrich-Wilhelms-Universität (today Humboldt-Universität) under the musical accompaniment of SA- and SS-Kapellen, burnt over 20,000 books from many, mainly Jewish, communist, liberal and social-critical authors, before a large audience at the university's Old Library and in the middle of the former Kaiser-Franz-Josef-Platz (1911–1947), now Bebelplatz.

== Conception ==
=== Historical context ===
On April 6, 1933, the Nazi German Student Association's Main Office for Press and Propaganda announced a nationwide initiative "against the un-German spirit", climaxing in a literary Säuberung, or cleansing, by fire. Local chapters of the group were charged with the distribution of literary blacklists that included Jewish, Marxist, Socialist, anti-family, and anti-German literature and planned grand ceremonies for the public to gather and dispose of the objectionable material.

In Berlin, the German Student Union organized the celebratory book burnings that took place on May 10, 1933, on a dreary, rainy evening. 40,000 people crowded into the Opernplatz (as it was then known) as 5,000 German students proceeded past them, holding burning torches to ceremonially ignite the pile of books seized for the event. Joseph Goebbels, Germany's Reich Minister of Propaganda, spoke at the event, declaring that "the era of exaggerated Jewish intellectualism is now at an end… and the future German man will not just be a man of books… this late hour [I] entrust to the flames the intellectual garbage of the past." Thirty-four additional book burnings took place across Germany that month.

=== Commissioning ===
On the occasion of the 60th anniversary of the Bebelplatz book burning in 1993, The Berlin Senat for Building and Housing invited thirty artists to participate in a memorial design competition. Israeli installation artist Micha Ullman's subtle submission was selected as the winner. Ullman, whose work frequently deals with themes of absence and memory, proposed digging a memorial into the surface of the Bebelplatz, thus creating a void. The monument was unveiled on May 20, 1995.

== Design ==
=== Appearance ===
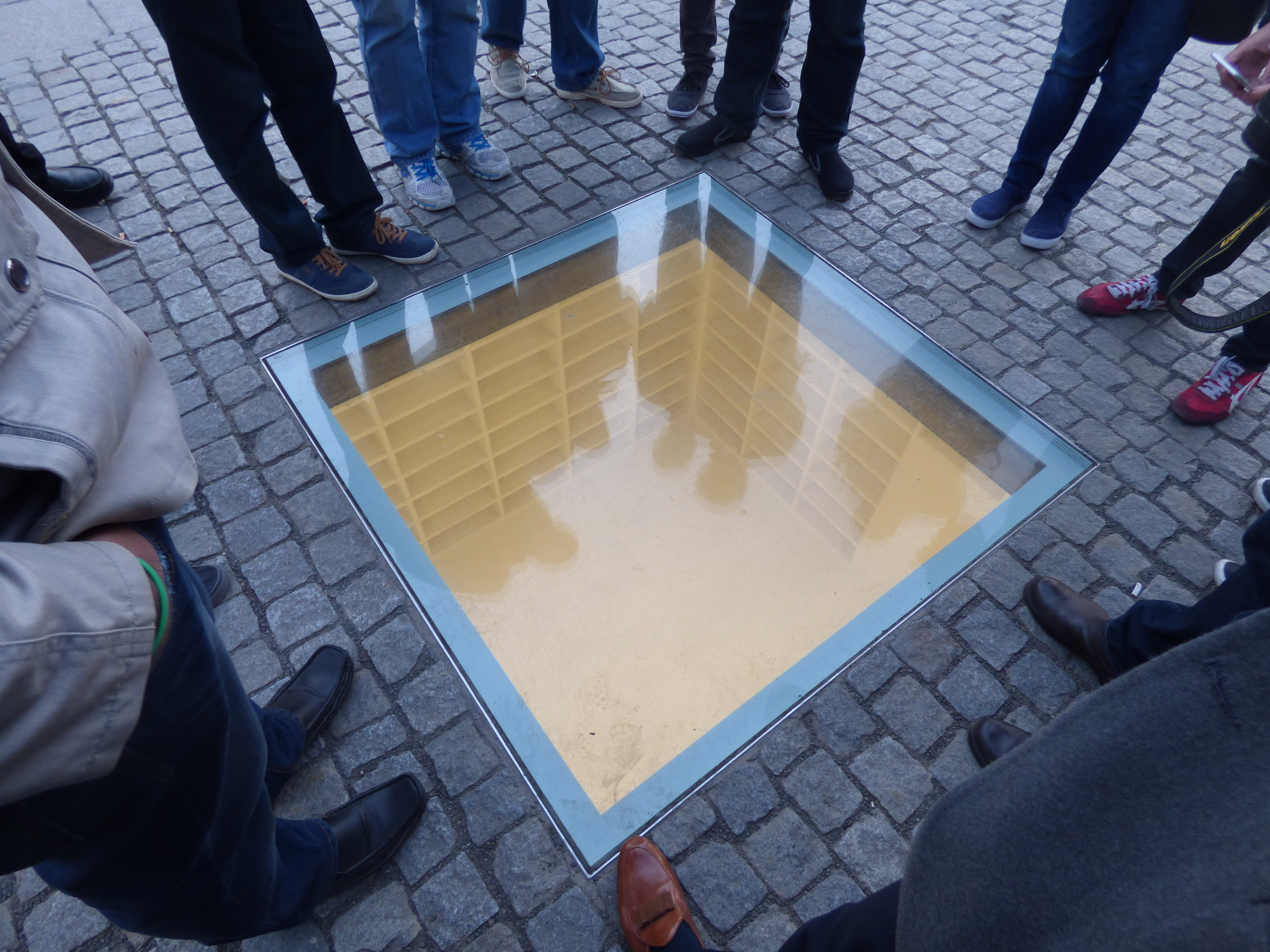
Visitors look through the glass into the library below

The Empty Library consists of a 530 by 706 by 706 centimetres (209 in × 278 in × 278 in) subterranean room lined with empty white bookshelves, beneath a glass plate in the pavement of the square. The memorial exemplifies what art historian James E. Young terms as "negative form," sinking into the cobblestones of the Bebelplatz to create a void. The placement of the room underneath the cobblestones of the plaza forces viewers to crane their necks in order to look into the memorial. Approximating the volume of the 20,000 books burned on that site on May 10, 1933, the space inside the monument is air-conditioned to prevent condensation on the glass pane that sits level with the surface of the plaza and remains continuously lit. While The Empty Library's low profile can make it difficult to spot during the daytime, at night it illuminates the Bebelplatz with an eerie white light.

The memorial is located at the height of the backfilled western ramp of the Lindentunnel, which was demolished for the construction over a length of 25 metres.

=== Location ===
Ullman's memorial is situated within the Bebelplatz in the Mitte district of Berlin, Germany. Located in front the Former Royal Library and across the Unter den Linden from Humboldt University, the monument sits at the same location as the pyre of books burned on May 10, 1933.

=== Plaque ===
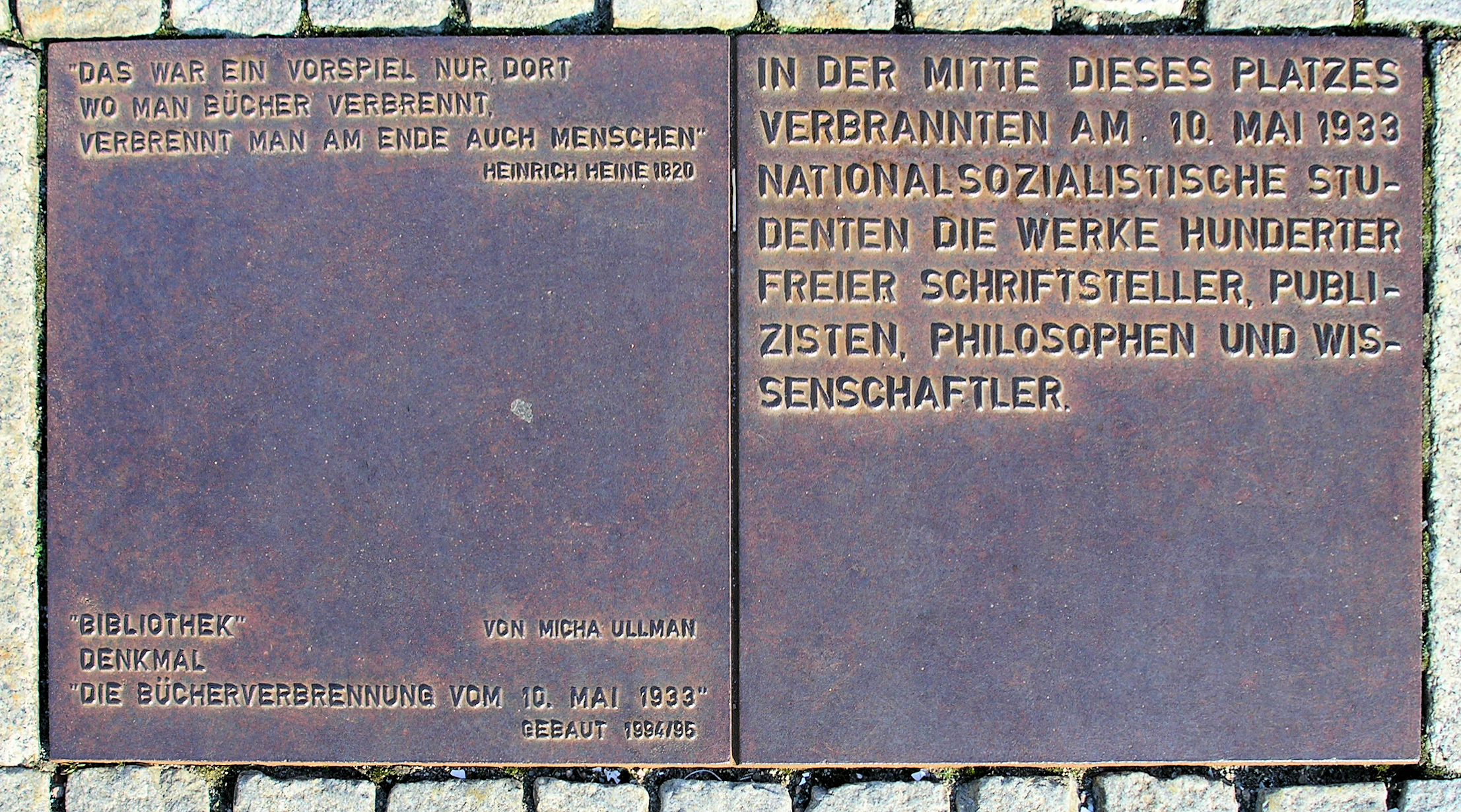
Plaque featuring Heinrich Heine quote

Several years after the main structure of the memorial was built, a bronze plaque was inlaid into the cobblestones a few feet away.

Etched with an epigraph taken from the great German-Jewish writer Heinrich Heine's 1820 play Almansor, it features the chilling message:

"Das war ein Vorspiel nur,
dort wo man Bücher verbrennt,
verbrennt man am Ende auch Menschen."
("This was but a prelude;
where they burn books,
they ultimately burn people").

Though Heine's words are remarkably prescient within the context of the Holocaust, copies of his works, which were featured on the Nazi literary blacklists, were likely destroyed during the Berlin book burning.

== Maintenance ==
The costs for the care and maintenance of the memorial (for example, the special glass pane must be replaced every three months) are covered by Wall AG.

== Controversy ==
Years after the construction of the memorial, a parking garage was built underneath the Bebelplatz. Ullman was a vocal opponent of the construction, citing worries regarding the philosophical resonance of the monument as a void changing. The garage contains an access route that enables maintenance workers to clean the monument two times a year.

== Gallery ==
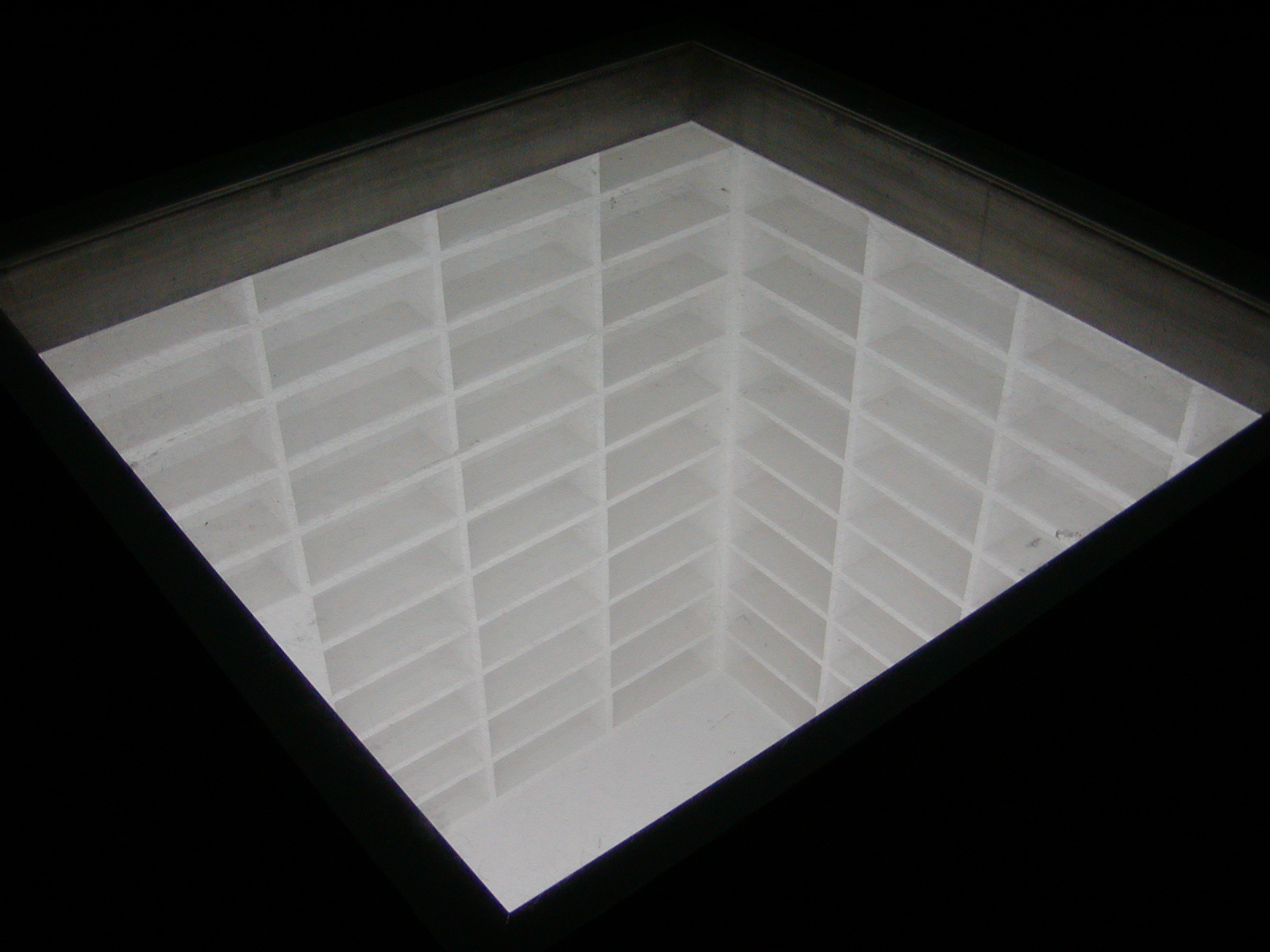
View into the monument; brightly lit at night

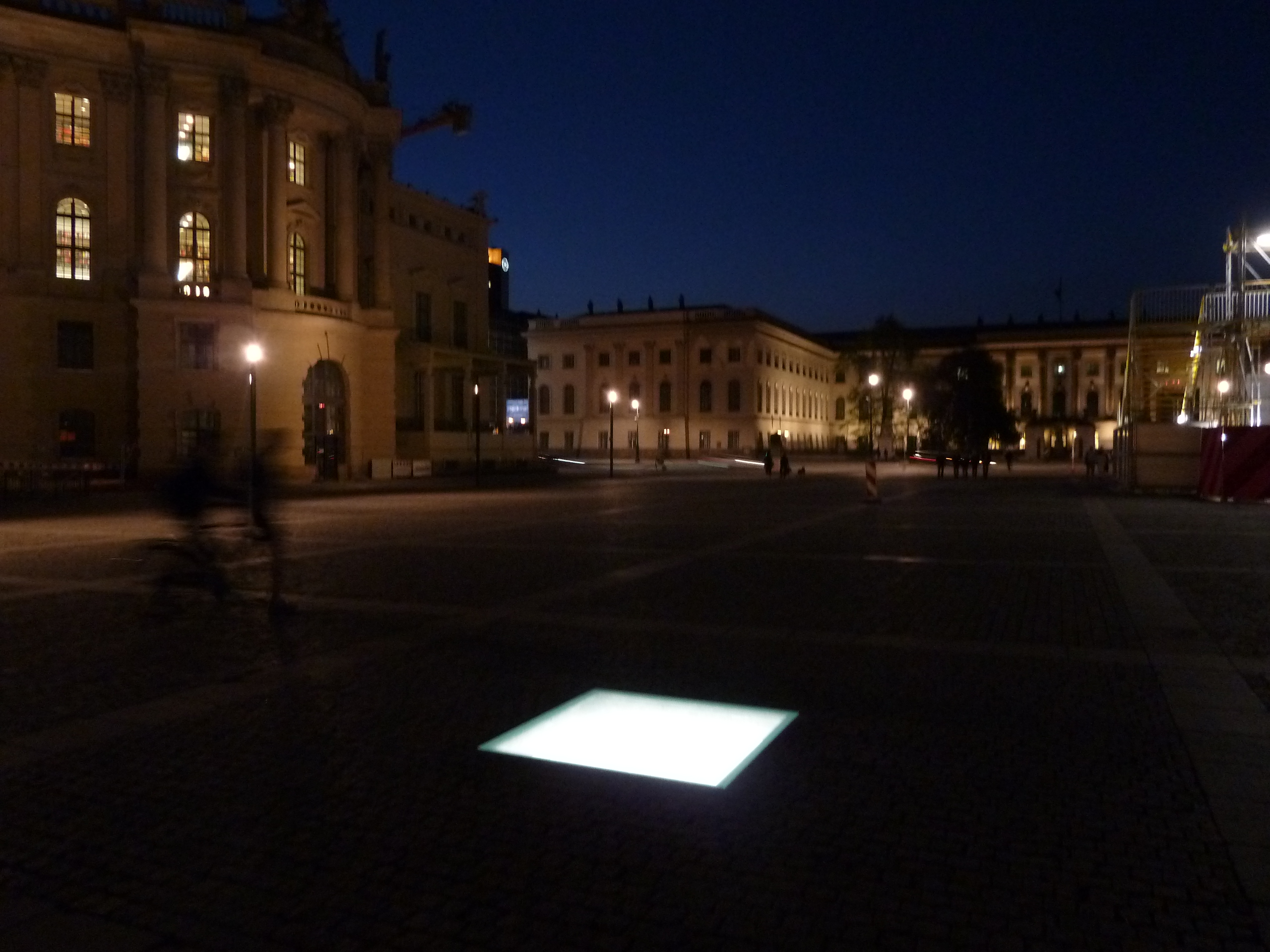
Bebelplatz at night

== See also ==
- Israeli art
