= Micha Ullman =

Israeli sculptor and professor of art (born 1939)

- מיכה אולמן
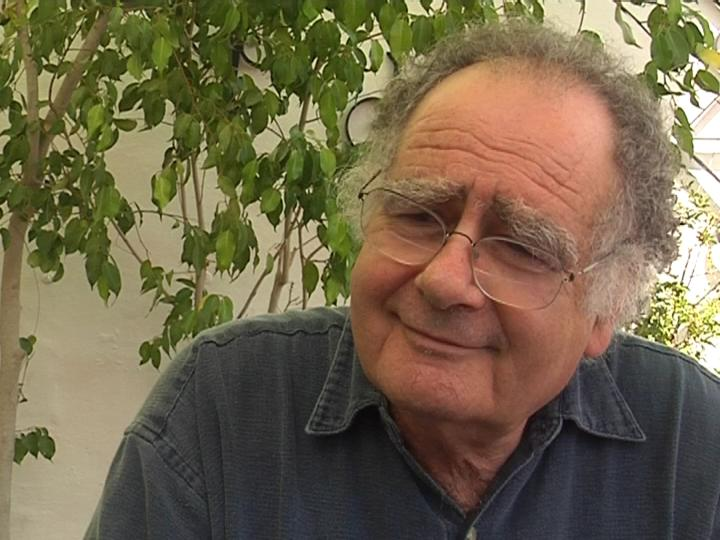
- Micha Ullman in 2006
- Born: 11 October 1939 (age 87); Tel Aviv, Mandatory Palestine
- Occupations: Sculptor; Professor of art
- Known for: "Empty Library" memorial in Berlin; Underground and void-themed sculptures

Micha Ullman (Hebrew: מיכה אולמן; born 11 October 1939) is an Israeli sculptor and professor of art.

== Biography ==
Ullman was born in Tel Aviv to German Jews who immigrated to Mandate Palestine in 1933. As a teenager, he attended the Kfar HaYarok agricultural school. From 1960 to 1964, he studied at Bezalel Academy of Art and Design in Jerusalem. In 1965, he attended the Central School of Arts and Crafts in London, where he learned etching.

Ullman is married to Mira, and lives in Ramat Hasharon, Israel.

== Academic career ==
He taught at Bezalel Academy from 1970 to 1978. He became a visiting professor at Academy of Arts Düsseldorf in 1976. He taught at the University of Haifa from 1979 to 1989. He was appointed Professor of Sculpture at the State Academy of Fine Arts Stuttgart from 1991 to 2005.

== Artistic career ==
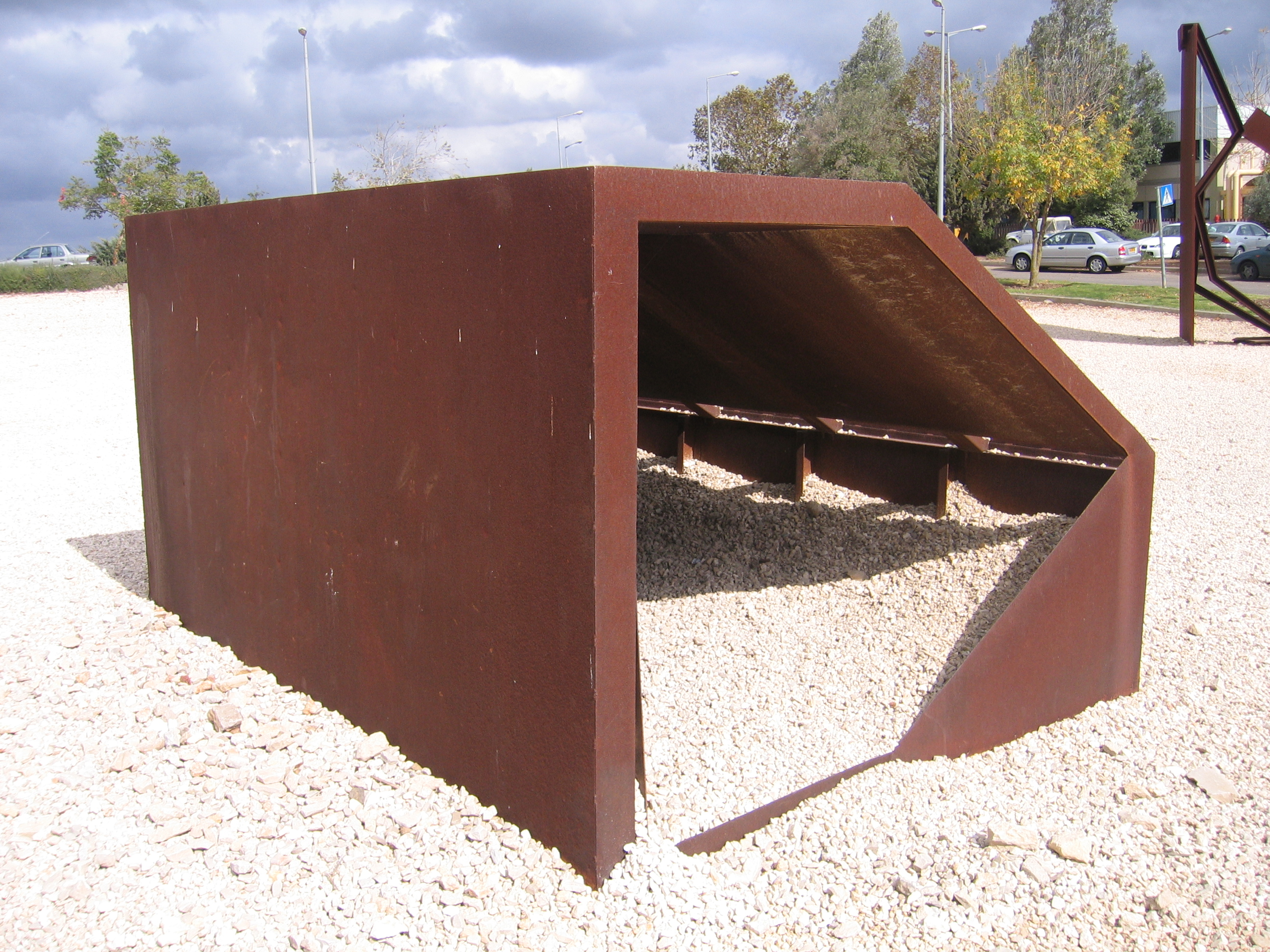
Havdalah, Micha Ullman

Ullman created the underground Empty Library memorial on Bebelplatz square in Berlin, where the Nazi book burnings began in 1933. The memorial consists of a window on the surface of the plaza, under which vacant bookshelves are lit and visible. A bronze plaque bears a quote by Heinrich Heine: “Where books are burned in the end people will burn.” This memorial was inaugurated in May 1995. (see book burning). Ullman explains: "It begins with the void that exists in every pit and will not disappear. You could say that emptiness is a state, a situation formed by the sides of the pit: The deeper it is, the more sky there will be and the greater the void. In the library containing the missing books, that void is more palpable. We expect [the books] but they are not there."

In 1997, Ullman completed a synagogue memorial in collaboration with Zvi Hecker and Eyal Weizmann, commemorating the former Lindenstraße synagogue in Kreuzberg.

Another of his creations is Hochwasser ("Flooding") on a small island near the Werra River in Germany. It was inspired by a boat Ullman saw there with a sign on it stating it had a capacity of up to seven passengers. Ullman's father, Yitzhak, who had lived nearby, immigrated to Palestine with his seven siblings in 1933.

Ullman is represented in the art collection of the State Academy of Fine Arts Stuttgart with the representative fourpart work Du, created in 1992 and shown at Documenta 9, which was given to the Academy as a permanent loan in 1993 by the Ministry of Science and Art Baden-Württemberg at the suggestion of the former Rector and head of the collection, Wolfgang Kermer.

== Sculptural style ==
Ullman creates subterranean sculptures, some of which barely protrude from the ground. They touch on universal themes such as the meaning of place and home, absence and emptiness. They have been described as simultaneously "celestial and earthbound, metaphysical but sensual and tactile.

== Gallery ==
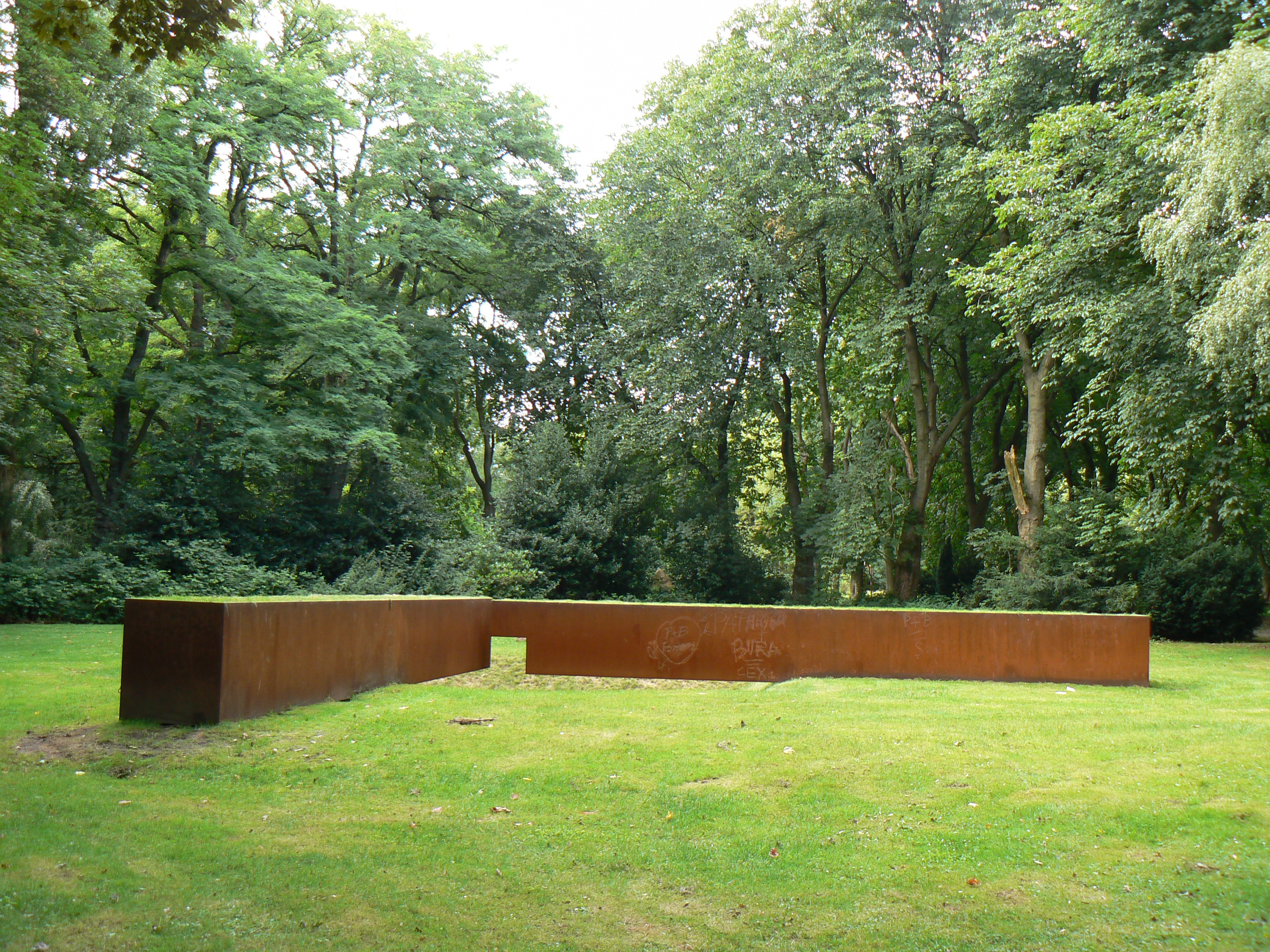
Ground, 1987
Marl, Germany

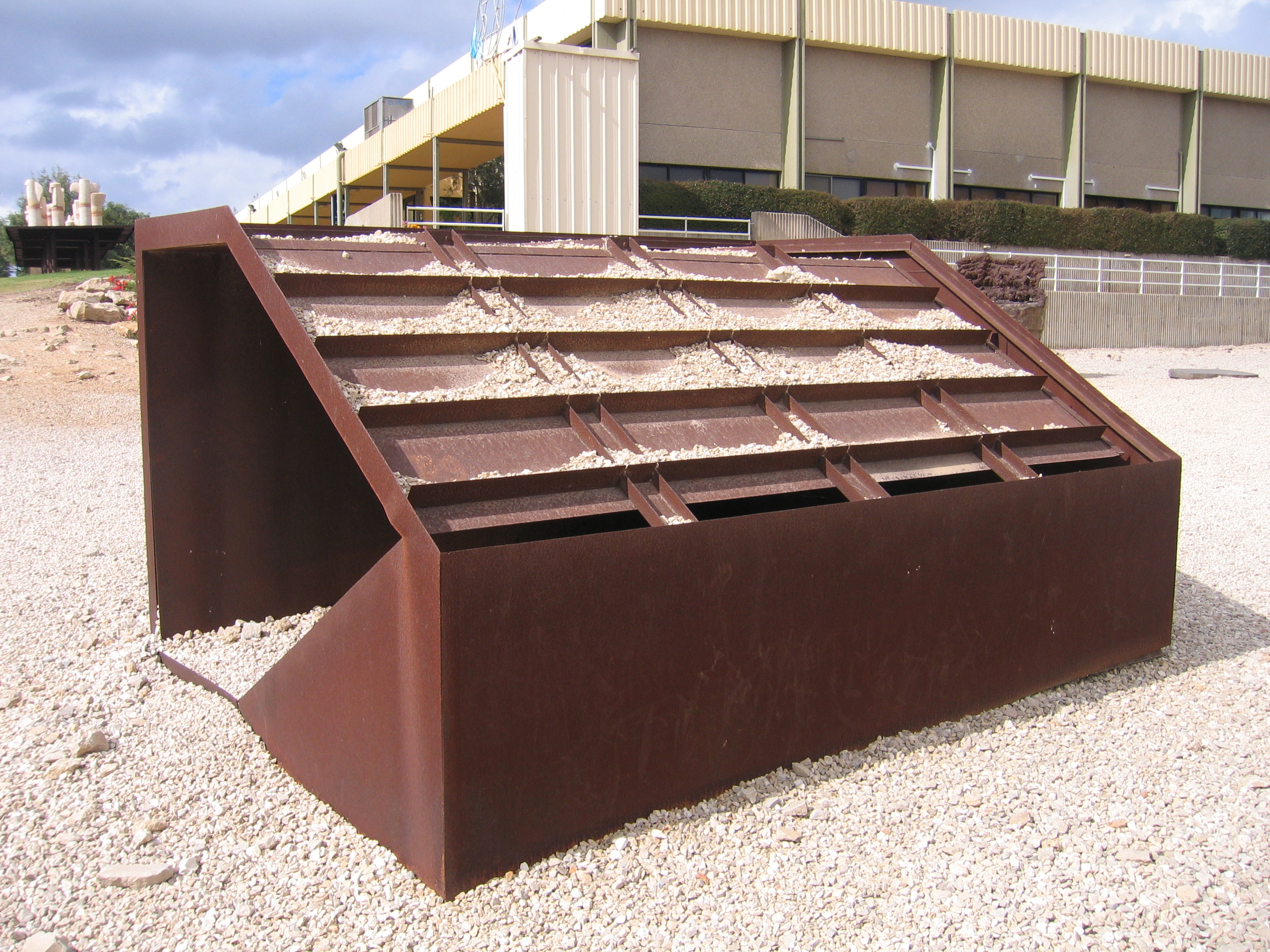
Havdalah, 1988
iron and gravel
facing German-Speaking Jewry Heritage Museum Tefen, Tefen Open Museum, Israel

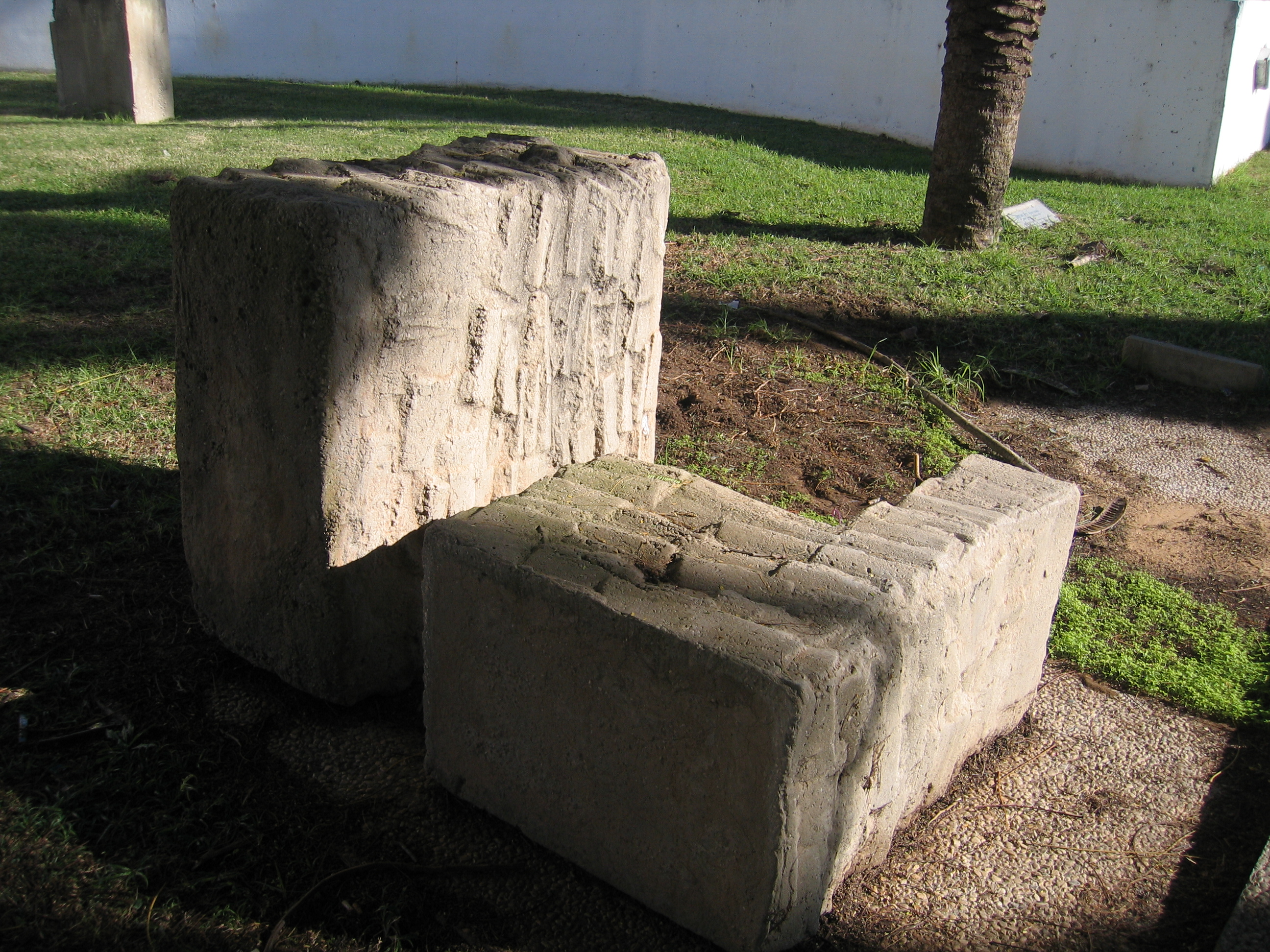
A Chair, 1989
stone
Tel Aviv University, Israel

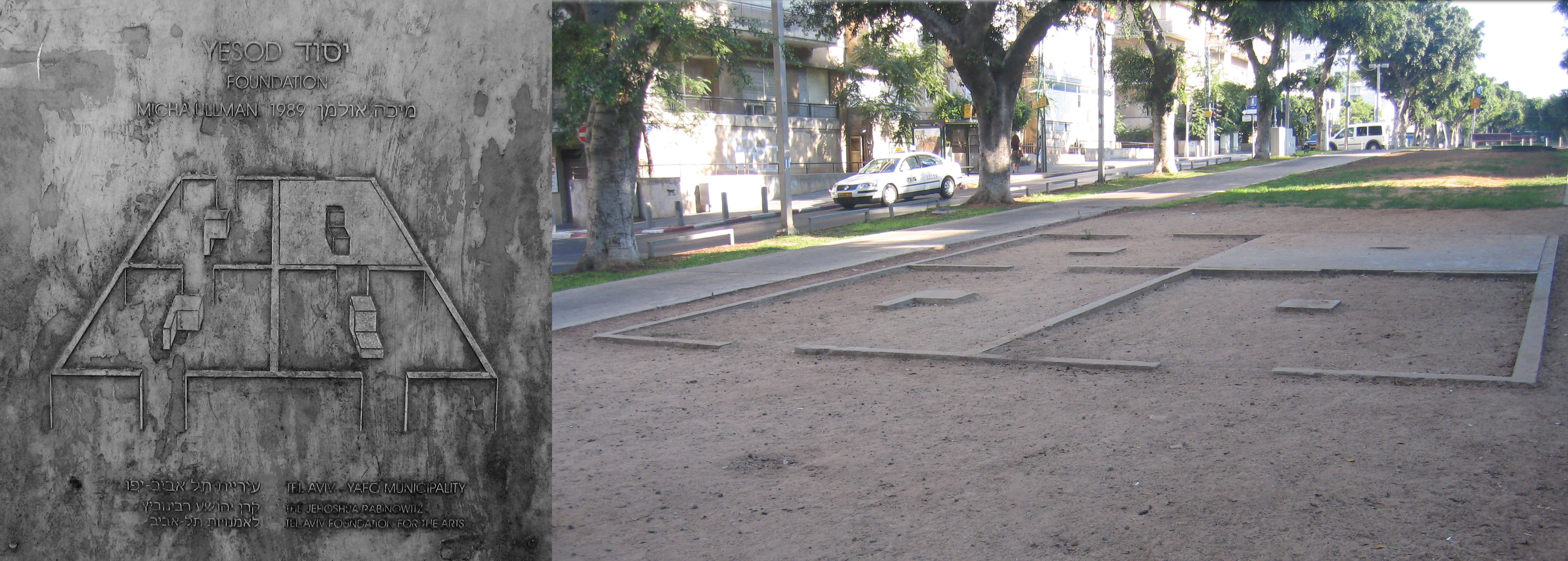
Yesod, 1989
concrete and sand
Rothschild Boulevard, Tel Aviv-Yafo, Israel

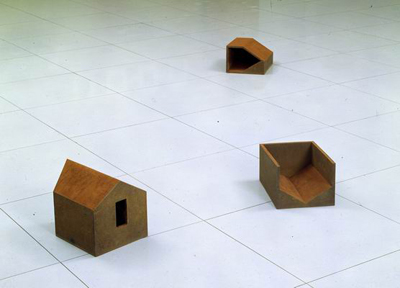
Day, Havdalah, Midnight, 1993
Steel plates and sand
The Israel Museum, Jerusalem Collection

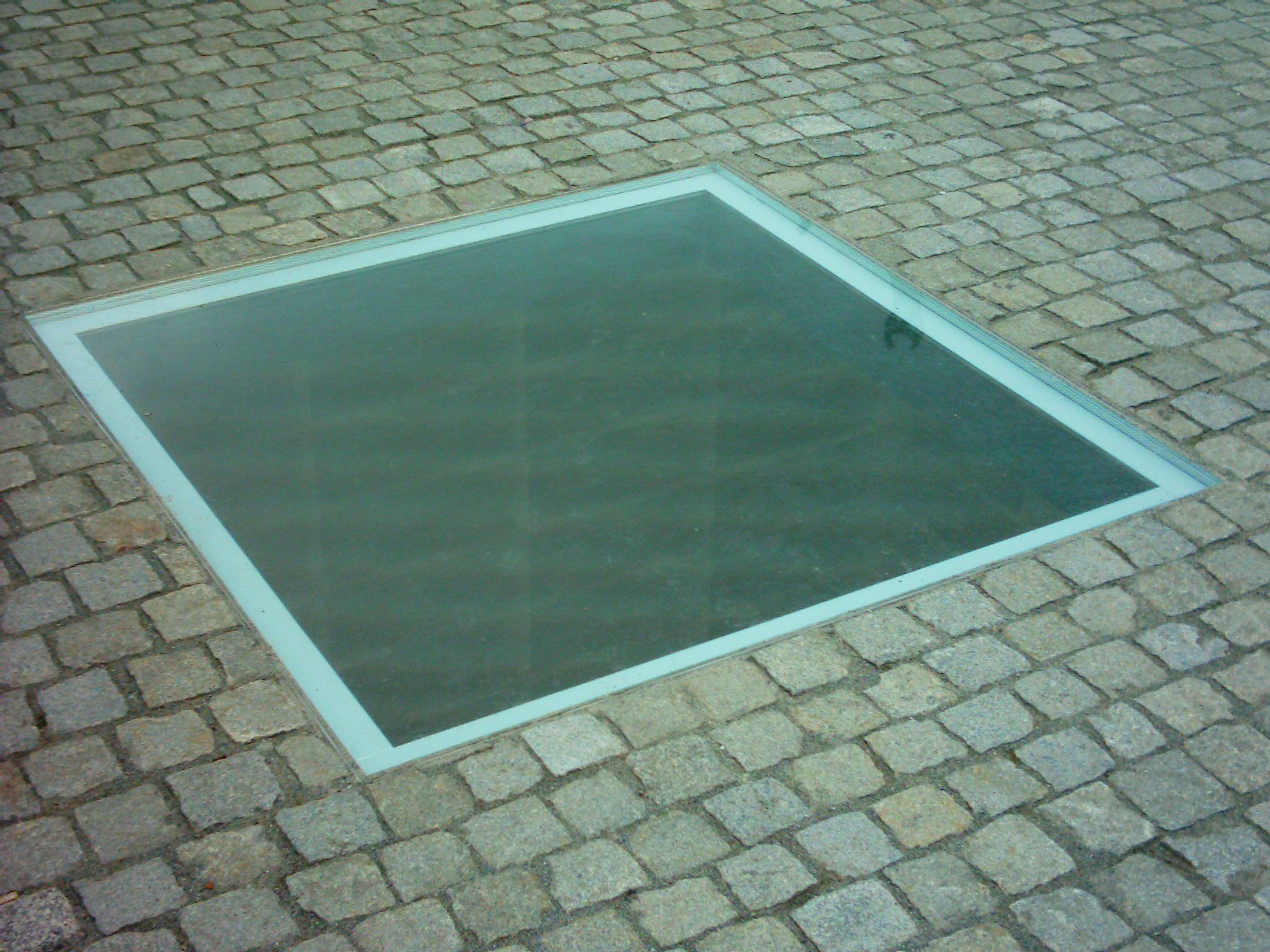
The Empty Library, 1995 at Bebelplatz, Berlin

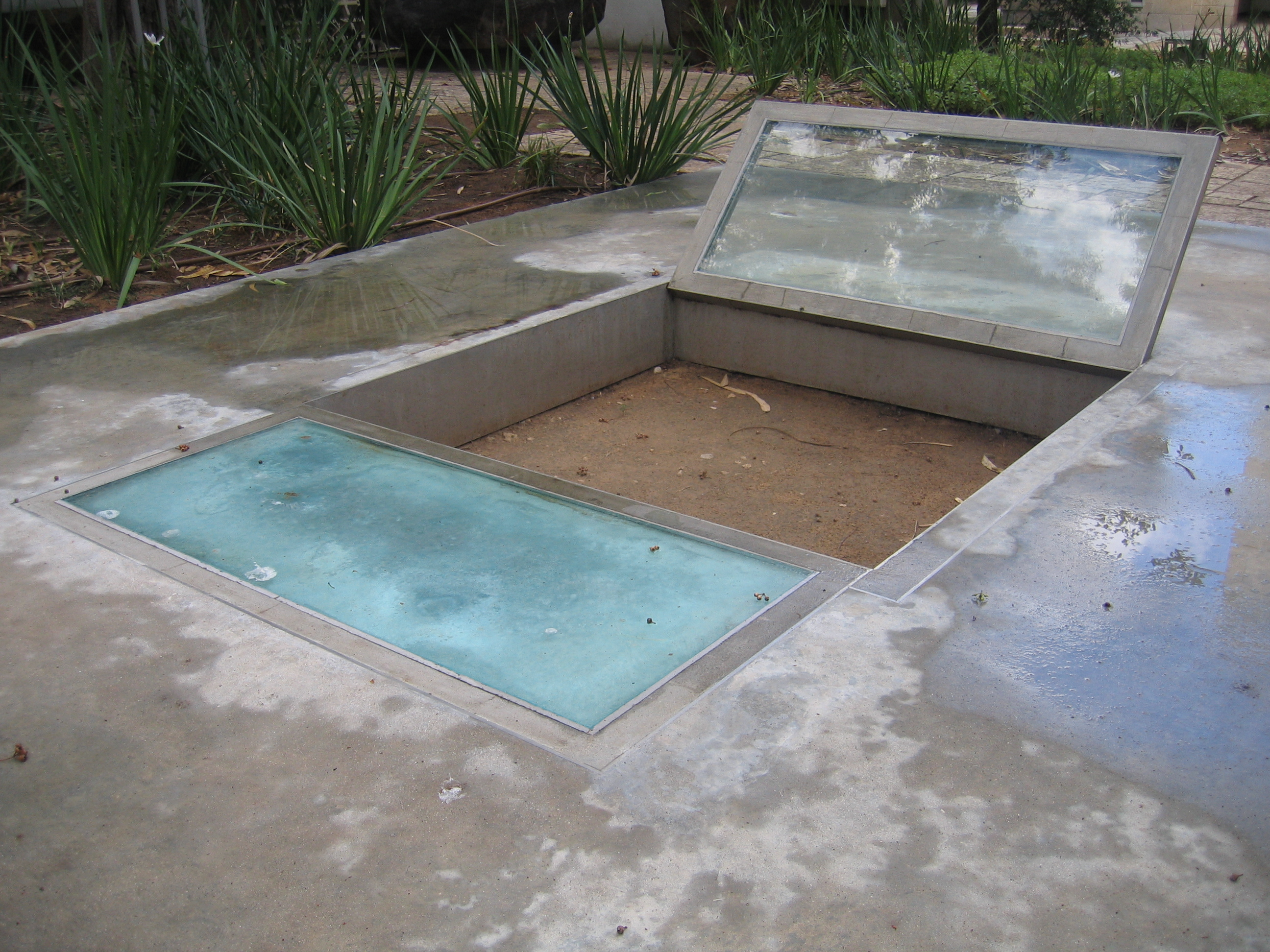
Window, 1999
Concrete, iron and glass
Tel Aviv Museum of Art

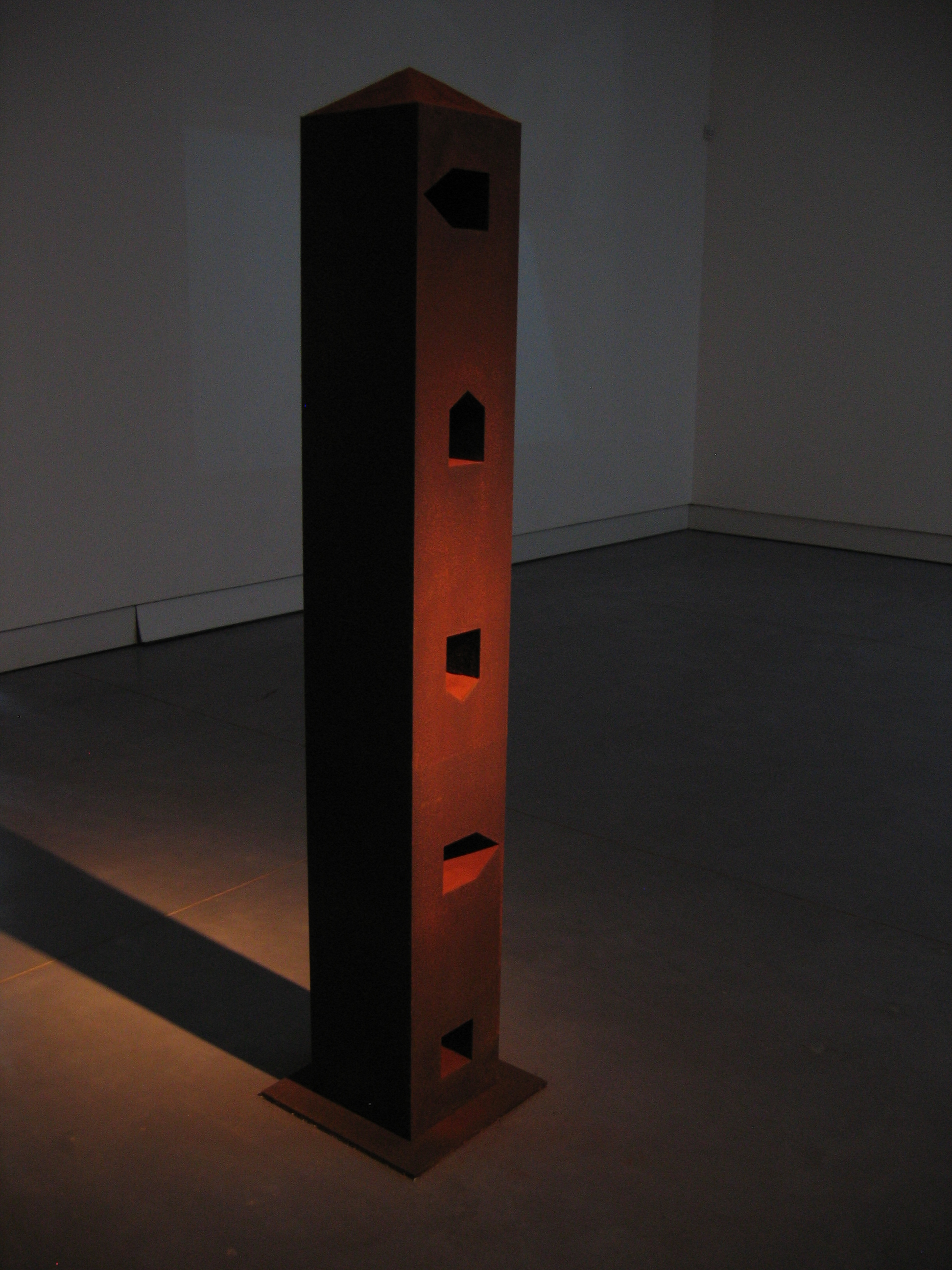
Pillar, 1995
Iron

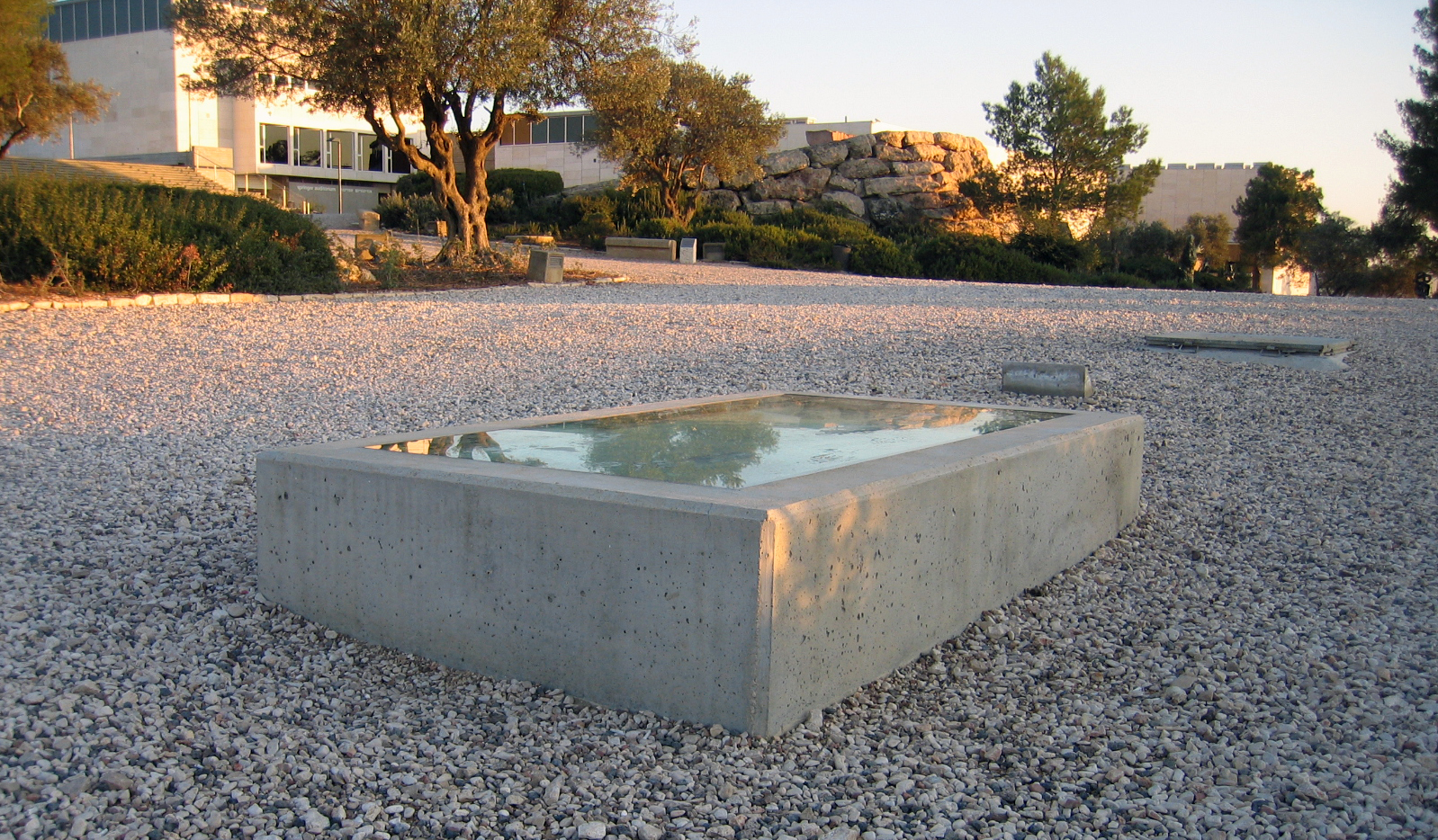
Equinox, 2005–09
Concrete and glass
The Israel Museum, Jerusalem Collection

== Education ==
- 1960–1964 Bezalel Academy of Arts and Design Academy, Jerusalem
- 1965 Central School of Arts and Crafts, London

== Teaching ==
- 1970–1978 Bezalel Academy of Arts and Design, drawing, basic design and etching
- 1976 Guest lecturer at Fine Arts Academy, Düsseldorf
- 1979 Haifa University, basic design, drawing, three-dimensional design
- 1979–1985 Faculty of Architecture, Technion, Haifa
- 1991–2005 State Academy of Fine Arts Stuttgart, sculpture

== Awards and prizes ==
Ullman was awarded the Israel Prize for sculpture in April 2009.

- 1963 Sonborn Prize, Bezalel Academy of Arts and Design Academy of Arts & Design, Jerusalem
- 1972 The Beatrice S. Kolliner Award for a Young Israeli Artist, Israel Museum, Jerusalem
- 1980 The Sandberg Prize for Israeli Art, Israel Museum, Jerusalem, Israel
- 1985 Mendel Pundik Prize, Tel Aviv Museum
- 1989 Annual Scholarship, DAAD, Berlin
- 1995 Käthe Kollwitz Prize, Academy of Arts, Berlin
- 1996 Zussman Prize, Yad Vashem
- 1996 Member of the Academy of Arts, Berlin
- 1997 - פרס החברה לתרבות ולשלום בינלאומי, עמאן, ירדן.
- 1998 Janet and George Jarin Prize, America Israel Cultural Foundation
- 2000 Gamzu Prize and Aftovitzer Fund, Tel Aviv Museum of Art, Tel Aviv
- 2004 Awarded Honorary Ph.D, The Hebrew University, Jerusalem
- 2005 Hans-Thoma-Preis, Staatspreis des Landes Baden-Wurttemberg, Germany
- 2009 Israel Prize for Sculpture
- 2010 Gerhard-Altenbourg-Preis, Lindenau Museum Altenburg
- 2011 Moses-Mendelssohn-Preis des Landes Berlin, Germany

== Outdoor and public art ==
- 1983 Sky, limestone, Tel Hai, Israel
- 1984 Ben Hinnom Valley, iron and cable, Jerusalem
- 1984 Lot's Wife, earth, Mt. Sodom, Israel
- 1989 Jesod (Foundation), cement and sand, Rothschild Boulevard, Tel Aviv
- 1991 Schodnia (East), asphalt, Łódź, Poland
- 1992 Sea Level, cast iron, sandstone and glass, 22 Allenby St., Tel Aviv
- 1992 Niemand, corten steel and red loam, Gropius Bau, Berlin
- 1995 The Empty Library, cement and glass, Bebelplatz, Berlin
- 1996–1997 Water, Zion Square, West Jerusalem and Freres Street, East Jerusalem

== See also ==
- List of Israel Prize recipients
- Dorit Kedar, "A fine balance: Michael Gross and Micha Ullman" in Art in Israel Autumn 1989, Vol. 1, Number 3, Pg. 28-31.
