= Hutu Ten Commandments =

1990 anti-Tutsi document by Hassan Ngeze

The "Hutu Ten Commandments" (also "Ten Commandments of the Bahutu") was a document published in the December 1990 edition of Kangura, an anti-Tutsi, Hutu Power Rwandan-language newspaper in Kigali, Rwanda. The Hutu Ten Commandments are often cited as a prime example of anti-Tutsi propaganda that was promoted by genociders in Rwanda following the 1990 invasion by the Tutsi-dominated Rwandan Patriotic Front and prior to the 1994 Rwandan genocide. The chief editor of Kangura, Hassan Ngeze, was convicted of genocide and crimes against humanity in 2003 by the International Criminal Tribunal for Rwanda and was sentenced to 35 years' imprisonment.

== Text ==
The Hutu Ten Commandments

1. Every Hutu should know that a Tutsi woman, whoever she is, works for the interest of her Tutsi ethnic group. As a result, we shall consider a traitor any Hutu who

- marries a Tutsi woman
- employs a Tutsi woman as a concubine
- employs a Tutsi woman as a secretary or takes her under protection.

2. Every Hutu should know that our Hutu daughters are more suitable and conscientious in their role as woman, wife, and mother of the family. Are they not beautiful, good secretaries and more honest?
3. Hutu women, be vigilant and try to bring your husbands, brothers, and sons back to reason.
4. Every Hutu should know that every Tutsi is dishonest in business. His only aim is the supremacy of his ethnic group. As a result, any Hutu who does the following is a traitor:

- makes a partnership with Tutsi in business
- invests his money or the government's money in a Tutsi enterprise
- lends or borrows money from a Tutsi
- gives favors to Tutsi in business (obtaining import licenses, bank loans, construction sites, public markets, etc.).

5. All strategic positions, political, administrative, economic, military and security should be entrusted only to Hutu.
6. The education sector (school pupils, students, teachers) must be majority Hutu.
7. The Rwandan Armed Forces should be exclusively Hutu. The experience of the October 1990 war has taught us a lesson. No member of the military shall marry a Tutsi.
8. The Hutu should stop having mercy on the Tutsi.
9. The Hutu, wherever they are, must have unity and solidarity and be concerned with the fate of their Hutu brothers.

- The Hutu inside and outside Rwanda must constantly look for friends and allies for the Hutu cause, starting with their Hutu brothers.
- They must constantly counteract Tutsi propaganda.
- The Hutu must be firm and vigilant against their common Tutsi enemy.

10. The Social Revolution of 1959, the Referendum of 1961, and the Hutu Ideology, must be taught to every Hutu at every level. Every Hutu must spread this ideology widely. Any Hutu who persecutes his brother Hutu for having read, spread, and taught this ideology is a traitor.

== See also ==
- Red Terror (Ethiopia)
- Twelve Theses (Nazi Germany in 1933)
- Bahutu Manifesto
