= Uffe =

Uffe may refer to:

- Uffe (given name), a list of people with the given name
- Klettenberger Mühlgraben, formerly also called Uffe, a river of Thuringia, Germany
- Uffe (Wieda), a river of Lower Saxony and Thuringia, Germany
