= Bagram Bible program =

Scandal related to a proselytization program in Afghanistan

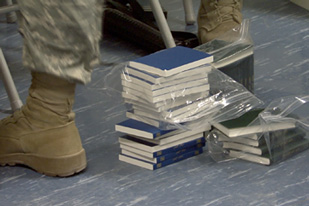
DoD spokesmen stated these Bibles sent to Bagram, for proselytizing, were confiscated.

The Bagram Bible Program was a scandal that occurred at Bagram Air Base, in Afghanistan. In May 2009, it was made public that Christian groups had published Bibles in the Pashto and Dari languages, intended to convert Afghans from Islam to Christianity. The Bibles were sent to soldiers at the Bagram Air Base. American military authorities reported that Bible distribution was not official policy, and when a chaplain became aware of the soldiers' plans, the Bibles were confiscated and, eventually, burned.

Al Jazeera's English service were the first to break the story. The story they reported included footage of a religious service for soldiers that appeared to show soldiers being encouraged to proselytize. American authorities claimed the footage from the religious service took place a year before its broadcast, and had been taken out of context.

== See also ==
- Christianity in Afghanistan
- List of book-burning incidents
- Separation of church and state in the United States
