= Uffe (given name) =

Uffe is a male given name. Notable people with the given name include:

- Uffe of Angel, a legendary king of the Angles mentioned in the Anglo-Saxon Chronicle
- Uffe Baadh, a.k.a. Frank Bode (1923–1980), Danish jazz musician who emigrated to the United States
- Uffe Bech (b. 1993), Danish footballer
- Uffe Elbæk (b. 1954), Danish social worker, author, journalist, entrepreneur and politician
- Uffe Ellemann-Jensen (1941–2022), Danish politician
- Uffe Haagerup (1949–2015), Danish mathematician
- Uffe Markussen (b. 1952), Danish jazz reedist
- Uffe Pedersen (b. 1954), former Danish football player, manager
- Uffe Ravnskov (b. 1934), Danish medical doctor
- Uffe Schultz Larsen (1921–2005), Danish sport shooter
