= List of book-burning incidents =

Notable book burnings – the public burning of books for ideological reasons – have taken place throughout history.

== Antiquity ==
=== A scroll written by the Hebrew prophet Jeremiah (burnt by King Jehoiakim) ===
In about 600 BC, Jeremiah of Anathoth wrote that the King of Babylon would destroy the land of Judah. As recounted in Jeremiah 36, Jeremiah's scroll was read before Jehoiakim, King of Judah, and a group officials. Upon hearing the contents of the scroll, King Jehoiakim destroyed the scroll in a fire and sought to have Jeremiah arrested. Jeremiah and his scribe, Baruch son of Neriah, were able to evade arrest and would eventually rewrite the original scroll and many similar works.

=== Protagoras' "On the Gods" (by Athenian authorities) ===
The Classical Greek philosopher Protagoras was a proponent of agnosticism, writing in a now lost work titled On the Gods: "Concerning the gods, I have no means of knowing whether they exist or not or of what sort they may be, because of the obscurity of the subject, and the brevity of human life". Quotations of his works were embedded in the works of later authors. According to Diogenes Laërtius, the above outspoken agnostic position taken by Protagoras aroused anger, causing the Athenians to expel him from their city, where the authorities ordered all copies of the book to be collected and burned in the marketplace. The same story is also mentioned by Cicero. However, the classicist John Burnet doubts this account, as both Diogenes Laërtius and Cicero wrote hundreds of years later and no such persecution of Protagoras is mentioned by contemporaries who make extensive references to this philosopher. Burnet notes that even if some copies of Protagoras' book were burned, enough of them survived to be known and discussed in the following century.

=== Democritus' writings (by Plato) ===
The philosopher Plato is said to have greatly disliked fellow-philosopher Democritus and wanted all of Democritus' books burned. Aristoxenus, in his Historical Notes, affirms that "Plato wished to burn all the writings of Democritus that he could collect". (Note: Aristoxenus' book is lost, but the Plato reference survives in a quote in Diogenes Laërtius' Lives and Opinions of Eminent Philosophers, ix. 40) In his own lifetime, Plato was not in a position to destroy all copies of his rival's writings himself, but Plato's purpose was largely achieved through the choices made by scribes in later Classical times. Plato's own writings were frequently copied, and unlike nearly all of his philosophical contemporaries, Plato's entire work is believed to have survived intact for over 2,400 years. Conversely, none of Democritus' writings have survived, and only fragments are known from his vast body of work. Still, these fragments are enough to let many consider Democritus to be "The Father of Modern Science".

=== Chinese philosophy books (by Emperor Qin Shi Huang and anti-Qin rebels) ===
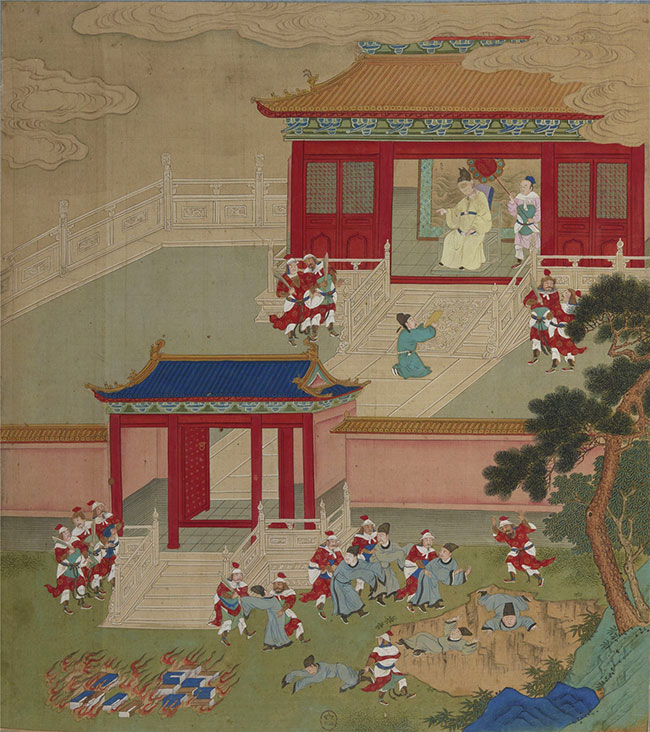
Killing the Scholars and Burning the Books, anonymous 18th century Chinese painted album leaf

During the Warring States period, China was divided into various states – each of which had its own historians, writing over centuries their version of the history of their state and its relations with neighbors and rivals. Following Qin's conquest of all the others, Emperor Qin Shi Huang – on the advice of his minister Li Si – ordered the burning of all philosophy books and history books from states other than Qin – beginning in 213 BC. This is believed to have been followed by the live burial of a large number of intellectuals who did not comply with the state dogma; a belief which arose based on a passage written in Shiji, a Chinese historical text.

Li Si is reported to have said:

I, your servant, propose that all historian's records other than those of Qin's be burned. With the exception of the academics whose duty includes possessing books, if anyone under heaven has copies of the Shi Jing, the Classic of History, or the writings of the hundred schools of philosophy, they shall deliver them [the books] to the governor or the commandant for burning. Anyone who dares to discuss the Shi Jing or the Classic of History shall be publicly executed. Anyone who uses history to criticize the present shall have his family executed. Any official who sees the violations but fails to report them is equally guilty. Anyone who has failed to burn the books after thirty days of this announcement shall be subjected to tattooing and be sent to build the Great Wall. The books that have exemption are those on medicine, divination, agriculture and forestry. Those who have interest in laws shall instead study from officials.

Upon the passing of Huang, his son, Qin Er Shi, became emperor. He was deemed an incapable ruler, which led to civil unrest and revolts. The revolts ended his rule and resulted in the burning of the imperial palace and the state archives, ultimately destroying many of the remaining written records that had been spared during Qin Shi Huang's reign.

Several other large book burnings also occurred in Chinese history. It appears they occurred in every dynasty following the Qin, but it is unknown how often.

=== Books of pretended prophecies (by Roman authorities) ===
In 186 BC, in an effort to suppress the Bacchanalia practices that had been led in part by Minius Cerrinius, a consul of Rome claimed that the fathers and grandfathers of the Romans had suppressed foreign rites and ceremonies, "seeking out and burning all books of pretended prophecies."

=== Books of King Numa Pompilius (by Roman authorities) ===
In 181 BC, according to Livy 40:29:3-14, the books of King Numa Pompilius were discovered in stone coffins in the field of L. Petilius. They were shown to several people, including Praetor Q. Petilius, who testified an oath before the senate to have them burnt by the victimarii.

=== Jewish holy books (by the Seleucid monarch Antiochus IV) ===
In 168 the Seleucid monarch, Antiochus IV, launched a campaign against the Jewish religion, which included an order to burn all Jewish 'Books of Law' found in Jerusalem. This, along with other acts of religious persecutions, would come to cause the Maccabean Revolt, which is detailed in two books titled 1 Maccabees and 2 Maccabees.

=== Roman history book (by the aediles) ===
In 25 AD Senator Aulus Cremutius Cordus was forced to commit suicide and his History was burned by the aediles, under the order of the senate. The book's praise of Brutus and Cassius, who had assassinated Julius Caesar, was considered an offence under the lex majestatis. A copy of the book was saved by Cordus' daughter Marcia, and it was published again under Caligula. However, only a few fragments survived to the present.

=== Greek and Latin prophetic verse (by the emperor Augustus) ===
According to Suetonius, at the death of Marcus Lepidus (about 13 BC), Augustus assumed the office of Chief Priest, and burned over two thousand copies of Greek and Latin prophetic verse that were the works of anonymous or unrespected authors.

=== Torah scroll (by a Roman soldier) ===
Flavius Josephus relates that about the year 50 a Roman soldier seized a Torah scroll and, with abusive and mocking language, burned it in public. This incident almost brought on a general Jewish revolt against Roman rule. However, the Roman procurator Cumanus appeased the Jewish populace by beheading the culprit.

=== Sorcery scrolls (by early converts to Christianity at Ephesus) ===
In about the year 55 according to the New Testament book of Acts, early converts to Christianity in Ephesus who had previously practiced sorcery burned their scrolls.

=== Rabbi Haninah ben Teradion burned with a Torah scroll (under Hadrian) ===
Under the emperor Hadrian, the teaching of the Jewish Scriptures was forbidden, as, in the wake of the Bar Kokhba revolt , the Roman authorities regarded such teaching as seditious and tending towards revolt. Haninah ben Teradion, one of the Jewish Ten Martyrs executed for having defied that ban, is reported to have been burned at the stake together with the forbidden Torah scroll which he had been teaching from. According to Jewish tradition, when the flame started to burn himself and the scroll he still managed to say to his pupils: "I see the scrolls burning but the letters fly up in the air" – a saying considered to symbolize the superiority of ideas to brute force. While in the original applying to sacred writings only, 20th century Israeli writers also quoted this saying in the context of secular ideals.

=== Burning of the Torah by Apostomus (precise time and circumstances debated) ===
Among five catastrophes said to have overtaken the Jews on the Seventeenth of Tammuz, the Mishnah includes "the burning of the Torah by Apostomus". Since no further details are given and there are no other references to Apostomus in Jewish or non-Jewish sources, the exact time and circumstances of this event are debated. Historians have assigned it different dates in Jewish history under Seleucid or Roman rule, and it might be identical with one of the events noted above.

=== Epicurus' book (in Paphlagonia) ===
The book Established beliefs of Epicurus was burned in a Paphlagonian marketplace by order of the charlatan Alexander of Abonoteichus, supposed prophet of Glycon, the son of Asclepius c. 160.

=== Manichaean and Christian scriptures (by Diocletian) ===
The Diocletianic Persecution started on March 31, 302, with the Roman Emperor Diocletian, in a rescript from Alexandria, ordering that the leading Manichaeans be burnt alive along with their scriptures. On the following year, on February 23, 303, Diocletian ordered that the newly built Christian church at Nicomedia be razed, its scriptures burned, and its treasures seized. Later persecutions included the burning of both the Christians themselves and of their books. As related in later Christian Hagiography, at that time the governor of Valencia offered the deacon who would become known as Saint Vincent of Saragossa to have his life spared in exchange for his consigning Scripture to the fire. Vincent refused and let himself be executed instead. In religious paintings he is often depicted holding the book whose preservation he preferred to his own life (see illustration in Saint Vincent of Saragossa page). Conversely, many other Christians, less courageous, did save their lives by giving away their Scriptures to be burned. These Christians came to be known as Traditores (literally, "those who give away").

=== Books of Arianism (after Council of Nicaea) ===
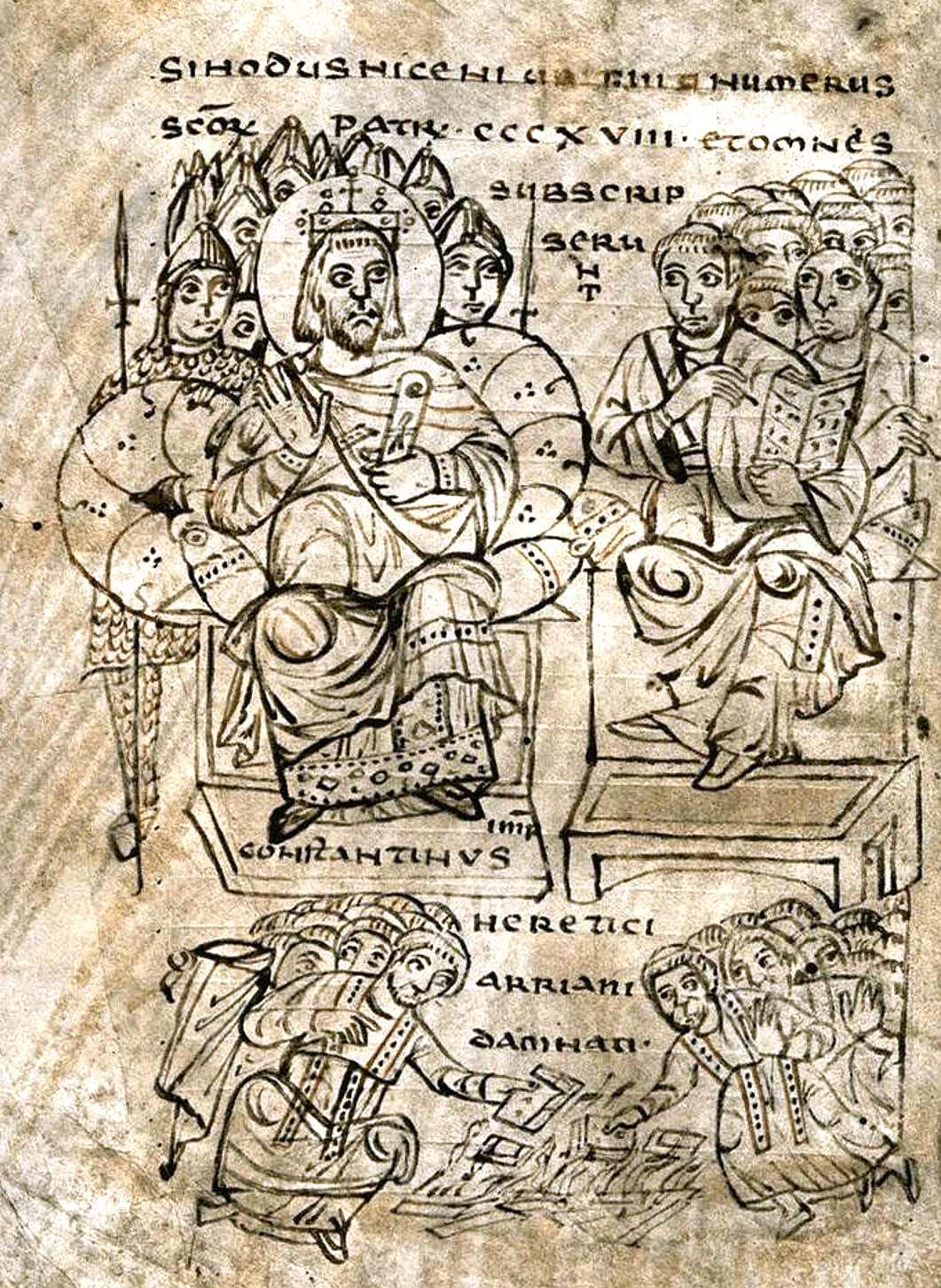
Burning of Arian books at Nicaea (illustration from a compendium of canon law, ca. 825, MS. in the Capitular Library, Vercelli)

The books of Arius and his followers, after the first Council of Nicaea (325 CE), were burned for heresy by the Roman emperors Constantine, Honorius, and Theodosius I, who published a decree commanding that, "the doctrine of the Trinity should be embraced by those who would be called Catholics; that all others should bear the infamous name of heretics".

=== Library of Antioch (by Jovian) ===
In 364, the Roman Catholic Emperor Jovian ordered the entire Royal Library of Antioch to be burnt, in what is suspected to be an attempt to destroy non-Christian materials. Not much is known about the Library of Antioch and some historians doubt the reasonings behind its destruction or even if this event ever occurred.

=== "Unacceptable writings" (by Athanasius) ===
In 367, Athanasius, the Bishop of Alexandria, ordered monks in the Coptic Orthodox Church of Alexandria to destroy all "unacceptable writings' or non-Christian materials in Egypt. This claim was initially made by historian of religion Elaine Pagels, and despite the fact that there is no evidence to support this claim, it has been frequently cited as fact on the internet.

=== Sibylline books (various times) ===
The Sibylline Books were a collection of oracular sayings. According to myth, the Cumaean sibyl offered Lucius Tarquinius Superbus the books for a high price, and when he refused, burned three. When he refused to buy the remaining six at the same price, she again burned three, finally forcing him to buy the last three at the original price. The quindecimviri sacris faciundis watched over the surviving books in the Temple of Jupiter Optimus Maximus, but could not prevent their being burned when the temple burned down in 83 BC. They were replaced by a similar collection of oracular sayings from around the Mediterranean in 76 BC, along with the sayings of the Tiburtine sibyl, and then checked by priests for perceived accuracy as compared to the burned originals. These remained until for political reasons they were burned by Flavius Stilicho (died 408).

=== Writings of Priscillian (by Roman authorities) ===
In 385, the theologian Priscillian of Ávila became the first Christian to be executed by fellow-Christians as a heretic. Some (though not all) of his writings were condemned as heretical and burned. For many centuries they were considered irreversibly lost, but surviving copies were discovered in the 19th century.

=== Etrusca Disciplina (by Roman authorities) ===
Etrusca Disciplina, the Etruscan books of cult and divination, were collected and burned in the 5th century.

=== Books on astrology (by Roman authorities) ===
In 409, the emperors Theodosius II and Honorius ordered that astrologers burn their books on pain of expulsion.

=== Porphyry's books (by Theodosius II) ===
In AD 435 and 448, Theodosius II ordered every copy of Porphyry' s famous works, Against the Christians to be burned.

=== Nestorius' books (by Theodosius II) ===
The books of Nestorius, declared to be heresy, were burned under an edict of Theodosius II (435). The Greek originals of most writings were destroyed, surviving mainly in Syriac translations.

== Middle Ages ==
=== "Book of the Miracles of Creation" (reportedly destroyed by Saint Brendan) ===
According to the Dutch De Reis van Sinte Brandaen (Mediaeval Dutch for The Voyage of Saint Brendan), one of the earliest accounts of the life of Saint Brendan, the Saint got possession of a "Book of the Miracles of Creation", but disbelieved in its veracity and threw it into a fire. An angel was angry with Brendan for this act, told him that truth has been destroyed, and charged him with traveling for nine years overseas as a penance for his sin. All accounts of Brendan's life were written down hundreds of years after his time, and it is difficult to distinguish fact from legend – including this account of his burning a book. However, since Brendan was a major, highly venerated Irish saint, there was no obvious reason for posterity to attribute to him a sinful act without any factual basis.

=== Patriarch Eutychius' book (by Emperor Tiberius II Constantine) ===
Patriarch Eutychius of Constantinople published a treatise, on the General Resurrection, maintaining that the resurrected body "will be more subtle than air, and no longer palpable". (Note: The dictionary account is apparently based on Bede, Book II, Chapter 1, who used the expression "...impalpable, of finer texture than wind and air.") Pope Gregory the Great opposed, citing the palpability of the risen Christ. As the dispute could not be settled, the Byzantine emperor, Tiberius II Constantine, undertook to arbitrate. He decided in favor of palpability and ordered Eutychius' book to be burned.

=== Repeated destruction of Alexandria libraries (multiple people) ===
The so-called "Daughter Library" of the Serapeum of Alexandria was reportedly looted and burned (along with the rest of the Serapeum) in 391/392 AD by the decree of Theophilus of Alexandria, who was ordered to do so by Theodosius I. However, contemporary accounts do not mention the destruction of a library, or speak of its collection of books in the past tense, indicating that by the time of its destruction the Serapeum may have been relegated mostly to a pagan place of worship. One of the largest destructions of books occurred at the Library of Alexandria, traditionally held to be in 640; however, the precise years are unknown, as is whether the fires were intentional or accidental.

=== Qur'anic texts with varying wording (ordered by the 3rd Caliph, Uthman) ===
Uthman ibn 'Affan, the third Caliph of Islam after Muhammad, who is credited with overseeing the collection of the verses of the Qur'an, ordered the destruction of any other remaining text containing verses of the Quran after the Quran has been fully collected, c. 650. This was done to ensure that the collected and authenticated Quranic copy that Uthman collected became the primary source for others to follow, thereby ensuring that Uthman's version of the Quran remained authentic. Although the Qur'an had mainly been propagated through oral transmission, it also had already been recorded in at least three codices, most importantly the codex of Abdullah ibn Mas'ud in Kufa, and the codex of Ubayy ibn Ka'b in Syria. Sometime between 650 and 656, a committee appointed by Uthman is believed to have produced a singular version in seven copies, and Uthman is said to have "sent to every Muslim province one copy of what they had copied, and ordered any other Qur'anic materials, whether written in fragmentary manuscripts or whole copies, be burnt."

=== Iconoclast writings (by Byzantine authorities) ===
Following the "Triumph of Orthodoxy" in 843, when the Byzantine Iconoclasts were decisively defeated and the worship of Icons formally restored, the Byzantine secular and religious authorities destroyed almost all Iconoclast writings, making it difficult for modern researchers to determine what exactly were the Iconoclasts' reasons to oppose the use of icons in Christian worship.

=== Book Burnings in Umayyad Al-Andalus ===
The Umayyad Caliph, Abd al-Rahman III, condemned the works of Muhammad ibn Masarra (died 931), a local scholar interested in kalam and sufism, in a series of decrees as heretical; causing ibn Massara's books to be burnt in the courtyard of the Great Mosque of Cordoba in 961. This event sets a precedent for later Muslim book burnings for jurists and rulers in Spain and the Maghreb. As such, al-Manṣūr replicated this act by burning books from the library of the caliph al-Hakam II in order to demonstrate his commitment to Islam, gain popular favor and cement his own rule.

=== Samanid dynasty library (by Turks) ===
The Royal Library of the Samanid dynasty was burned at the turn of the 11th century during the Turkic invasion from the east. Avicenna was said to have tried to save the precious manuscripts from the fire as the flames engulfed the collection.

=== Library of Ray (by Ghaznavids) ===
In 1029, the Sunni Ghaznavid ruler Mahmud, during the sack of Ray, destroyed a large part of the collection of its Buyyid owners as he considered the books, many of them Shiite, heretical. The surviving books were then taken to Mahmud's capital of Ghazni.

=== Competing prayer books (at Toledo) ===
After the conquest of Toledo, Spain (1085) by the king of Castile, whether Iberian Christians should follow the foreign Roman rite or the traditional Mozarabic rite became a subject of dispute. After other ordeals, the dispute was submitted to the trial by fire: One book for each rite was thrown into a fire. The Toledan book was little damaged after the Roman one was consumed. Henry Jenner comments in the Catholic Encyclopedia: "No one who has seen a Mozarabic manuscript with its extraordinarily solid vellum, will adopt any hypothesis of Divine Interposition here."

=== Almohad and Almoravid Al-Andalus ===
In 1109, the masterwork of al-Ghazālī, Iḥ yā’ `Ulūm al-Dīn (The Revival of the Religious Sciences), was burned on command of the Almoravid amir Ali ibn Yusuf in the courtyard of the Great Mosque of Cordoba in front of the assembled notables. Al-Ghazālī books were burned again in 1143 in the context of the rising threat of the Almoravids in the Maghrib Under Almohad caliph Abu Yaqub Yusuf the study of philosophy was forbidden, philosophy books burned, and the famous philosopher Averroes was banished to Lucena.

=== Abelard forced to burn his own book (at Soissons) ===
The provincial synod held at Soissons (in France) in 1121 condemned the teachings of the famous theologian Peter Abelard as heresy; he was forced to burn his own book before being shut up inside the convent of St. Medard at Soissons.

=== Writings of Arnold of Brescia (in France and Rome) ===
Arnold of Brescia spoke out against several of the actions taken by the Church of Rome, specifically related to the Church's wealth. He was condemned at the Synod of Sens in 1141, and went on to lead the Commune of Rome in direct opposition to the Pope. The Church ordered all of his writings to be burned, which was done in such a through manner that the only evidence showing he wrote anything is the order for its destruction. (Note: Arnold's life depends for its sources on Otto of Freising and a chapter in John of Salisbury's Historia Pontificalis.) Arnold was eventually arrested and hung in 1155, his body was then burned. Nevertheless, Arnold's teachings and beliefs on apostolic poverty retained their influence after his death among "Arnoldists" and more widely among Waldensians and the Spiritual Franciscans.

=== Nalanda University (by Bakhtiyar Khilji) ===
The library of Nalanda, known as Dharma Gunj (Mountain of Truth) or Dharmaganja (Treasury of Truth), was the most renowned repository of Hindu and Buddhist knowledge in the world at the time. Its collection was said to comprise hundreds of thousands of volumes, so extensive that it burned for months when set aflame allegedly by Bakhtiyar Khalji in 1193.

=== Buddhist writings in the Maldives (by royal dynasty converted to Islam) ===
Following the conversion of the Maldives to Islam in 1153 (or by some accounts in 1193), the Buddhist religion – hitherto state religion for more than a thousand years – was suppressed. The Dhanbidhū Lōmāfānu gives information about events in the southern Haddhunmathi Atoll, which had been a major center of Buddhism – where monks were beheaded, and where the statues of Vairocana and the transcendent Buddha were destroyed. At that time, the wealth of Buddhist manuscripts written on screwpine leaves by Maldivian monks in their Buddhist monasteries were either burnt or otherwise so thoroughly eliminated that they disappeared without leaving any trace.

=== Buddhist writings in the Gangetic plains region of India (by Turk-Mongol raiders) ===
According to William Johnston, as part of the Muslim conquest of the Indian subcontinent, there was a persecution of the Buddhist religion, considered idolatrous from the Muslim point of view. During the 12th and 13th centuries, Buddhist texts were burnt by the Muslim armies in the Gangetic plains region, which also destroyed hundreds of Buddhist monasteries and shrines and killed monks and nuns.

=== Ismaili Shiite writings at Al-Azhar (by Saladin) ===
Between 120,000 and 2,000,000 works were destroyed under Saladin when he converted the Al-Azhar madrassah from Ismaili Shiism to Sunni Islam.

=== Alamut Castle (by Mongols) ===
The library of the Alamut Castle, the main stronghold of the order of the Nizari Ismailis, was burned after the invading Mongols captured it. It is widely accepted that the Mongols burned Alamut for religious reasons, as the library contained many materials the Mongols believed to be heretical, but it is also noted that the capture of Alamut gave the Mongols a significant military advantage. Due to the destruction, there are very few primary sources from the Ismailis remaining today.

=== Destruction of Cathar texts (Languedoc region of France, by the Catholic Church) ===
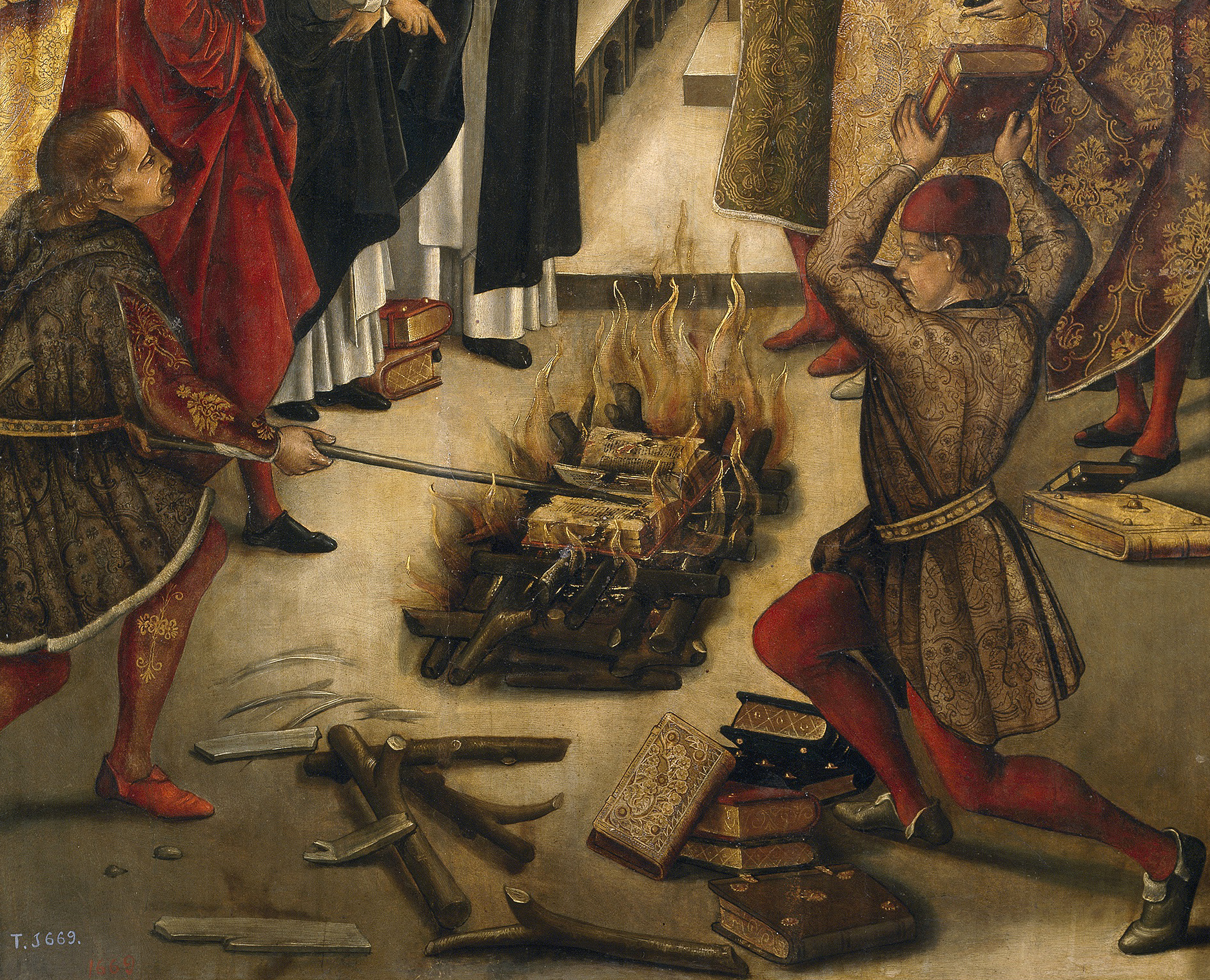
Detail of a Pedro Berruguete painting of a disputation between Saint Dominic of Guzman and the Albigensians (Cathars) in which the books of both were thrown on a fire, with St. Dominic's books miraculously preserved from the flames. See the whole picture.

During the 13th century, the Catholic Church waged a brutal campaign against the Cathars of Languedoc, culminating in the Albigensian Crusade. Nearly every Cathar text that could be found was destroyed, in an effort to completely extirpate their heretical beliefs; only a few are known to have survived. Historians researching the Cathar religious principles are forced to largely rely on information written by their opponents.

=== Maimonides' philosophy (at Montpellier) ===
Maimonides' major philosophical and theological work, "Guide for the Perplexed", got highly mixed reactions from fellow-Jews of his and later times – some revering it and viewing it as a triumph, while others deemed many of its ideas heretical, banning it and on some occasions burning copies of it. (Note: See the entry "Maimonidean Controversy, under Maimonides, in volume 11 of the Encyclopaedia Judaica, Keter Publishing, and Dogma in Medieval Jewish Thought by Menachem Kellner.) One such burning took place at Montpellier, Southern France, in 1233.

=== The Talmud (at Paris), first of many such burnings over the next centuries (by Royal and Church authorities) ===
In 1242, The French crown burned all copies of the Talmud in Paris, about 12,000, after the book was "charged" and "found guilty" in the Disputation of Paris, sometimes called "the Paris debate" or the "Trial of the Talmud." These burnings of Jewish books were initiated by Pope Gregory IX, who persuaded Louis IX of France to undertake it. This particular book burning was commemorated by the German Rabbi and poet Meir of Rothenburg in the elegy (kinna) called, Sha'ali Serufa Ba'eish, or "Ask, O you who are burned in fire" (שאלי שרופה באש), which is recited to this day by Ashkenazi Jews on the fast of Tisha B'av.

The Church's original stance alleged that the Talmud contained blasphemous writings towards Jesus Christ and his mother Mary, attacks against the Church and other offensive pronouncements against non-Jews, which led subsequent popes to organize public burnings of Jewish books. The best known of these were Innocent IV (1243–1254), Clement IV (1256–1268), John XXII (1316–1334), Paul IV (1555–1559), and Pius V (1566–1572).

Once the printing press was invented, the Church found it impossible to destroy entire printed editions of the Talmud and other sacred books. Johann Gutenberg, the German who invented the printing press around 1450, certainly helped stamp out the effectiveness of further book burnings. The tolerant (for its time) policies of Venice made it a center for the printing of Jewish books (and of books in general), yet the Talmud was publicly burned in 1553 and there was a lesser-known burning of Jewish books in 1568.

=== House of Wisdom library (By Mongols) ===
The House of Wisdom was destroyed during the Mongol invasion of Baghdad in 1258, along with all other libraries in Baghdad. It was said that the waters of the Tigris ran black for six months with ink from the enormous quantities of books flung into the river. Some modern historians have begun to doubt the actual extent of these damages.

=== Rabbi Nachmanides' account of the Disputation of Barcelona (by Dominicans) ===
In 1263 the Disputation of Barcelona was held before King James I of Aragon between the monk Pablo Christiani (a convert from Judaism) and Rabbi Moses ben Nachman (also known as Nachmanides). At the end of disputation, king awarded Nachmanides a monetary prize and declared that never before had he heard "an unjust cause so nobly defended." Since the Dominicans nevertheless claimed the victory, Nahmanides felt compelled to publish the controversy. The Dominicans asserted that this account was blasphemous against Christianity. Nahmanides admitted that he had stated many things against Christianity, but he had written nothing which he had not used in his disputation in the presence of the King, who had granted him freedom of speech. The justice of his defense was recognized by the King and the commission, but, to satisfy the Dominicans, Nahmanides was exiled and his pamphlet was condemned to be burned.

=== Lollard books and writings (by English law) ===
The De heretico comburendo ("On the Burning of Heretics"), a law passed by the English Parliament under King Henry IV of England in 1401, was intended to stamp out "heresy" and in particular the Lollard movement, followers of John Wycliffe. The law stated that "divers false and perverse people of a certain new sect ...make and write books, [and] do wickedly instruct and inform people". The law's purpose was to "utterly destroy" all "preachings, doctrines, and opinions of this wicked sect". Therefore, all persons in possession of "such books or writings of such wicked doctrine and opinions" were ordered to deliver all such books and writings to the diocesan authorities, within forty days of the law being enacted, so as to let them be burned and destroyed. Those failing to give up their heretical books would face the prospect of being arrested and having their bodies as well as their books burned.

=== Wycliffe's books (at Prague) ===
On December 20, 1409, Pope Alexander V (later declared an anti-Pope) issued a papal bull that empowered the illiterate Prague Archbishop Zbyněk Zajíc z Házmburka to proceed against Wycliffism in Prague. All copies of Wycliffe's writings were to be surrendered and his doctrines repudiated, and free preaching discontinued. After the publication of the bull in 1410, the Czech Wycliffite leader Jan Hus appealed to Alexander V, but in vain. The Wycliffe books and valuable manuscripts were burned in the court of the Archbishop's palace in the Lesser Town of Prague, and Hus and his adherents were excommunicated by Alexander V. Archbishop Zajíc died in 1411, and with his death there was an upsurge of the Bohemian Reformation. Some of Hus' followers, led by Vok Voksa z Valdštejna, burnt the Papal bulls. Hus, they said, should be obeyed rather than the Church, which they considered a fraudulent mob of adulterers and simonists. In January 1413, a general council in Rome condemned the writings of Wycliffe and ordered them to be burned. Hus – tricked into arriving at the Council of Constance by a false safe conduct – was seized and burned at the stake. Over forty years after Hus's death, the Council reiterated the order for Wycliffe's books to be burned, and since Wycliffe himself was already dead, it ordered that his body be exhumed and burned – which was duly done.

=== Villena's books (in Castile) ===
Henry of Villena, a scion of Aragon's old dynasty, was a scholar, surgeon, and translator who was persecuted by the kings of Castile and Aragon as a sorcerer and necromancer. Upon his death in prison, John II of Castile ordered his confessor Bishop Barrientos to burn Villena's library The poet Juan de Mena skewered the bishop for this destruction in his Labyrinth of Fortune and others accused him of plundering it for the purpose of later plagiarizing the works himself, but Barrientos portrayed himself as bound by his king's orders and as having done what he could to preserve the library's most important works:

Your Majesty, after the death of Don Enrique de Villena, as a Christian king, you sent me, your devoted follower, to burn his books, which I executed in the presence of your servants. These actions, and other ones, are a testament to your Majesty's devotion to Christianity. While this is praiseworthy, on the other hand, it is useful to entrust some books to reliable people who would use them solely with the goal of educating themselves to better defend the Christian religion and faith and to bedevil idolaters and practitioners of necromancy.

=== Codices of the peoples conquered by the Aztecs (by Itzcoatl) ===
According to the Madrid Codex, the fourth tlatoani Itzcoatl (ruling from 1427 (or 1428) to 1440) ordered the burning of all historical codices because it was "not wise that all the people should know the paintings". (Note: Note that León-Portilla finds Tlacaelel to be the instigator of this burning, despite lack of specific historical evidence.) Among other purposes, this allowed the Aztec state to develop a state-sanctioned history and mythos that venerated the Aztec god Huitzilopochtli.

=== Gemistus Plethon's Nómoi (by Patriarch Gennadius II) ===
After the death of the prominent late Byzantine scholar Gemistus Plethon, there was discovered among his papers a major work called Nómōn syngrafí (Νόμων συγγραφή; book of laws) or Nómoi (Νόμοι; laws). He had been compiling it throughout most of his adult life, but never published it. It contained his most esoteric beliefs, including an objection to some of the basic tenets of Christianity and an explicit advocacy of a restoration (in modified form) of the worship of gods of the Classical Greek mythology – obviously heretical as the Orthodox Church understood the term. The manuscript came into the possession of Princess Theodora, wife of Demetrios, despot of Morea. Theodora sent the manuscript to Gennadius II, Patriarch of Constantinople, asking for his advice on what to do with it; he returned it, advising her to destroy it. Morea was under invasion from Sultan Mehmet II, and Theodora escaped with Demetrios to Constantinople where she gave the manuscript back to Gennadius, reluctant to herself destroy the only copy of such a distinguished scholar's work. Gennadius finally burnt it in 1460. However, in a letter to the Exarch Joseph (which still survives) Gennadius details the book, providing chapter headings and brief summaries of the contents. Plethon's own summary of the Nómoi, titled Summary of the Doctrines of Zoroaster and Plato, also survived among manuscripts held by his former student Bessarion – though the full detailed text was lost with Gennadius' burning.

== Early Modern Period (from 1492 to 1650) ==
=== Decameron, Ovid and other "lewd" books (by Savonarola) ===
In 1497, followers of the Italian priest Girolamo Savonarola collected and publicly burned books and objects which were deemed to be "immoral", some – but by no means all – of which might fit modern criteria of pornography or "lewd pictures", as well as pagan books, gaming tables, cosmetics, copies of Boccaccio's Decameron, and all the works of Ovid which could be found in Florence.

=== Arabic and Hebrew books (in Andalucía) ===
In 1490, a number of Hebrew Bibles and a number of other Jewish books were burned at the behest of the Spanish Inquisition. In 1499 or in early 1500, about 5000 Arabic manuscripts, including a school library – all that could be found in the city – were consumed by flames in a public square in Granada, Spain, on the orders of Cardinal Ximénez de Cisneros, the Archbishop of Toledo and the head of the Spanish Inquisition, excepting only those on medicine, which are conserved in the library of El Escorial.

=== Arabic books and archives in Oran (by Spanish conquerors) ===
In 1509 Spanish forces commanded by Count Pedro Navarro, on the orders of Cardinal Francisco Jiménez de Cisneros, conquered the city of Oran in North Africa. Thereupon, the occupying forces set fire to the books and archives of the town – a direct continuation of Cardenal Cisneros' book destruction in Granada, a few years before (see above).

=== Catholic theological works (by Martin Luther) ===
At the instruction of Reformer Martin Luther, a public burning of books was held in the public square outside Wittenberg's Elster Gate on December 10, 1520. Together with the papal bull of Excommunication Exsurge Domine, issued against Luther himself, were burned works which Luther considered as symbols of Catholic orthodoxy – including the Code of Canon Law, the Summa Theologica of St. Thomas Aquinas and the Summa Angelica, Angelo Carletti's work on Scotist theology.

=== Lutheran and other Protestant writings (in the Habsburg Netherlands) ===
In March 1521 Emperor Charles V published in Flanders a ban prohibiting the "books, sermons and writings of the said Luther and all his followers and adherents" and ordering all such materials to be burnt. This was followed by a stream of local bans throughout the Habsburg Netherlands and in neighboring states, particularly the ecclesiastical principalities of Liège, Utrecht, Cologne and Munster. Implementation was intensive in the southern part of the Habsburg Netherlands (present-day Belgium). At Leuven eighty copies of Luther's works were burned in October 1520 (even before publication of the official ban). At Antwerp no less than 400 Lutheran works – 300 of them confiscated from booksellers – were destroyed in the Emperor's presence in July 1521. In the same month 300 Lutheran works were destroyed at Ghent. More public book burnings followed in 1522, at Bruges and twice more at Antwerp. Implementation of the Emperor's ban was less swift in the northern part (present day Netherlands). In 1522 the authorities at Leiden ordered confiscation of all Lutheran works in the town, but apparently did not burn them. The first mass book burning in the North was in 1521 in the ecclesiastical territory of Utrecht. The first mass book burning in Amsterdam took place later, in 1526. Thereafter, public book burning remained part of life in the Habsburg Netherlands for much of the 16th century, Anabaptist and Calvinist writings later joining the Lutheran ones in the flames. Yet despite this relentless campaign, Protestant writings continued to proliferate. As well as the books being burned, many of the printers and booksellers involved in disseminating them were themselves burned at the stake by the Inquisition.

=== Works of Galen and Avicenna (by Paracelsus) ===
In 1527, the innovative physician Paracelsus was licensed to practice in Basel, with the privilege of lecturing at the University of Basel. He published harsh criticism of the Basel physicians and apothecaries, creating political turmoil to the point of his life being threatened. He was prone to many outbursts of abusive language, abhorred untested theory, and ridiculed anybody who placed more importance on traditional medical texts than on practice ('The patients are your textbook, the sickbed is your study. If disease put us to the test, all our splendor, title, ring, and name will be as much help as a horse's tail'). In a display of his contempt for conventional medicine, Paracelsus publicly burned editions of the works of Galen and Avicenna – two of the most highly respected traditional medical texts, which established physicians tended to trust without reservations, but which according to Paracelsus contained many serious medical errors.

=== Books and papers of the Portuguese Order of Christ (By Fra António of Lisbon) ===
In 1523, Fra António (also known as Antonius of Lisbon) a Spanish-born Jerome friar, was given the authority and responsibility to "reform" the Order of Christ in Portugal. His reform included the burning of part of the Order's papers and books, as well as instigating the burning of human beings – he ordered two autos-da-fés, the first and only ones ever held in the Order's headquarters in Tomar, with a total of four people burned at the stake.

=== Servetus' writings (burned with their author at Geneva, and also burned at Vienne) ===
In 1553, Servetus was burned as a heretic at the order of the city council of Geneva, dominated by Calvin – because a remark in his translation of Ptolemy's Geographia was considered an intolerable heresy. As he was placed on the stake, "around [Servetus'] waist were tied a large bundle of manuscript and a thick octavo printed book", his Christianismi Restitutio. In the same year the Catholic authorities at Vienne also burned Servetus in effigy together with whatever of his writings fell into their hands, in token of the fact that Catholics and Protestants – mutually hostile in this time – were united in regarding Servetus as a heretic and seeking to extirpate his works. At the time it was considered that they succeeded, but three copies were later found to have survived, from which all later editions were printed.

=== The Historie of Italie (in England) ===
The Historie of Italie (1549), a scholarly and in itself not particularly controversial book by William Thomas, was in 1554 "suppressed and publicly burnt" by order of Queen Mary I of England – after its author was executed on charges of treason. Enough copies survived for new editions to be published in 1561 and 1562, after Elizabeth I came to power.

=== Religious and other writings of the Saint Thomas Christians (by the Portuguese Church in India) ===
On June 20, 1599 Aleixo de Menezes, Latin Catholic Archbishop of Goa, convened the Synod of Diamper at Udayamperoor (known as Diamper in non-vernacular sources). This diocesan synod or council was aimed at forcing the ancient Saint Thomas Christians of the Malabar Coast (modern Kerala state, India) to abandon their practices, customs and doctrines – the result of centuries of living their own Christian lives in an Indian environment – and force upon them instead the full doctrines and practices of 16th century European Catholic Christianity, at the time involved in a titanic struggle with the rising tide of European Protestantism. Among other things, the Synod of Diamper condemned as heretical numerous religious and other books current among the Saint Thomas Christians, which differed on numerous points from Catholic doctrine. All these were to be handed over to the Church, to be burned. Some of the books which are said to have been burnt at the Synod of Diamper are: 1.The book of the Infancy of the Saviour (History of Our Lord) 2. Book of John Braldon 3. The Pearl of Faith 4. The Book of the Fathers 5. The Life of the Abbot Isaias 6. The Book of Sunday 7. Maclamatas 8. Uguarda or the Rose 9. Comiz 10. The Epistle of Mernaceal 11. Menra 12. Of Orders 13. Homilies (in which the Eucharist is said to be the image of Christ) 14. Exposition of Gospels. 15. The Book of Rubban Hormisda 16. The Flowers of the Saints 17. The Book of Lots 18. The Parsimon or Persian Medicines. Dr Istvan Perczel, a Hungarian scholar researching Syrian Christians in India, found that certain texts survived the destruction of Syriac religious writings by the Portuguese missionaries. Manuscripts were either kept hidden by the Saint Thomas Christians or carried away by those of them who escaped from the area of Portuguese rule and sought refuge with Indian rulers. However, a systematic research is yet to be conducted, to determine which of the books listed as heretical at Diamper still exist and which are gone forever.

=== Maya codices (by Spanish Bishop of Yucatan) ===
July 12, 1562, Fray Diego de Landa, acting Bishop of Yucatán – then recently conquered by the Spanish – threw into the fires the books of the Maya. The number of destroyed books is greatly disputed. De Landa himself admitted to 27, other sources claim "99 times as many" – the later being disputed as an exaggeration motivated by anti-Spanish feeling, the so-called Black Legend. Only three Maya codices and a fragment of a fourth survive. Approximately 5,000 Maya cult images were also burned at the same time. The burning of books and images alike were part of de Landa's effort to eradicate the Maya "idol worship", which he considered "diabolical". As narrated by de Landa himself, he had gained access to the sacred books, transcribed on deerskin, by previously gaining the natives' trust and showing a considerable interest in their culture and language: "We found a large number of books in these characters and, as they contained nothing in which were not to be seen as superstition and lies of the devil, we burned them all, which they [the Maya] lamented to an amazing degree, and which caused them much affliction." De Landa was later recalled to Spain and accused of having acted illegally in Yucatán, though eventually found not guilty of these charges. Present-day apologists for de Landa assert that, while he had destroyed the Maya books, his own Relación de las cosas de Yucatán is a major source for the Mayan language and culture. Allen Wells calls his work an "ethnographic masterpiece", while William J. Folan, Laraine A. Fletcher and Ellen R. Kintz have written that Landa's account of Maya social organization and towns before conquest is a "gem."

=== Arabic books in Spain (owners ordered to destroy their own books by King Philip II) ===
In 1567, Philip II of Spain issued a royal decree in Spain forbidding Moriscos (Muslims who had been converted to Christianity but remained living in distinct communities) from the use of Arabic on all occasions, formal and informal, speaking and writing. Using Arabic in any sense of the word would be regarded as a crime. They were given three years to learn a "Christian" language, after which they would have to get rid of all Arabic written material. It is unknown how many of the Moriscos complied with the decree and destroyed their own Arabic books and how many kept them in defiance of the King's decree; the decree is known to have triggered one of the largest Morisco Revolts

=== "Obscene" Maltese poetry (by the Inquisition) ===
In 1584 Pasquale Vassallo, a Maltese Dominican friar, wrote a collection of songs, of the kind known as "canczuni", in Italian and Maltese. The poems fell into the hands of other Dominican friars who denounced him for writing "obscene literature". At the order of the Inquisition in 1585 the poems were burned for this allegedly 'obscene' content.

=== Arwi books (by Portuguese in India and Ceylon) ===
With the 16th-century extension of the Portuguese Empire to India and Ceylon, the staunchly Catholic colonizers were hostile to Muslims they found living there. An aspect of this was a Portuguese hostility to and destruction of writings in the Arwi language, a type of Tamil with many Arabic words, written in a variety of the Arabic script and used by local Muslims. Much of Arwi cultural heritage was thus destroyed, though the precise extent of the destruction might never be known.

=== Luther's Bible translation (by German Catholics) ===
Martin Luther's 1534 German translation of the Bible was burned in Catholic-dominated parts of Germany in 1624, by order of the Pope.

=== Uriel da Costa's book (by Jewish community and city authorities in Amsterdam) ===
The 1624 book An Examination of the Traditions of the Pharisees, written by the dissident Jewish intellectual Uriel da Costa, was burned in public by joint action of the Amsterdam Jewish Community and the city's Protestant-dominated City Council. The book, which questioned the fundamental idea of the immortality of the soul, was considered heretical by the Jewish community, which excommunicated him, and was arrested by the Dutch authorities as a public enemy to religion.

=== Marco Antonio de Dominis' writings (in Rome) ===
The theologian and scientist Marco Antonio de Dominis came in 1624 into conflict with the Inquisition in Rome and was declared "a relapsed heretic". He died in prison, which did not end his trial. On December 21, 1624, his body was burned together with his works.

=== Water Margin (by the Chongzhen Emperor) ===
The novel Water Margin was considered as a book perceived to carry messages of transgression, with the potential to undermine imperial authority. In 1642, in response to the rise of banditry and rebellion in Shandong, the Ming government under the Chongzhen Emperor ordered all its woodblocks and printed copies to be burned immediately.

== Early Modern Period (1650 to 1800) ==
=== Books burned by civil, military and ecclesiastical authorities between 1640 and 1660 (in Cromwell's England) ===
Sixty identified printed books, pamphlets and broadsheets and 3 newsbooks were ordered to be burned during this turbulent period, spanning the English Civil War and Oliver Cromwell's rule.

=== Socinian and Anti-Trinitarian books (by secular and church authorities in the Dutch Republic) ===
As noted by Jonathan Israel, the Dutch Republic was more tolerant than other 17th century states, allowing a wide range of religious groups to practise more or less freely and openly disseminate their views. However, the dominant Calvinist Church drew the line at Socinian and Anti-Trinitarian doctrines which were deemed to "undermine the very foundations of Christianity". In the late 1640s and 1650s, Polish and German holders of such views arrived in the Netherlands as refugees from persecution in Poland and Brandenburg. Dutch authorities made an effort to stop them spreading their theological writings, by arrests and fines as well as book-burning. For example, in 1645, the burgomasters at Rotterdam discovered a stock of 100 books by Cellius and destroyed them. In 1659 Lancelot van Brederode published anonymously 900 copies of a 563-page book assailing the dominant Calvinist Church and the doctrine of the Trinity. The writer's identity was discovered and he was arrested and heavily fined, and the authorities made an effort to hunt down and destroy all copies of the book – but since it had already been distributed, many of the copies survived. The book Bescherming der Waerheyt Godts by Foeke Floris, a liberal Anabaptist preacher, was in 1687 banned by authorities in Friesland which deemed it to be Socinian, and all copies were ordered to be burned. In 1669 the Hof (high court) of Holland ordered the Amsterdam municipal authorities to raid booksellers in the city, seize and destroy Socinian books – especially the Biblioteca fratrum Polonorum ("Book of the Polish Brethren"), at the time known to be widely circulating in Amsterdam. The Amsterdam burgomasters felt obliged to go along with this, at least formally – but in fact some of them mitigated the practical effect by warning booksellers of impending raids.

=== Book criticising Puritanism (in Boston) ===
The first book burning incident in the Thirteen Colonies occurred in Boston in 1651 when William Pynchon, founder of Springfield, Massachusetts, published The Meritorious Price of Our Redemption, which criticised the Puritans, who were then in power in Massachusetts. The book became the first banned book in North America, and subsequently all known copies were publicly burned. Pynchon left for England prior to a scheduled appearance in court, and never returned.

=== Manuscripts of John Amos Comenius (by anti-Swedish Polish partisans) ===
During the Northern Wars in 1655, the well-known Bohemian Protestant theologian and educator John Amos Comenius, then living in exile at the city of Leszno in Poland, declared his support for the Protestant Swedish side. In retaliation, Polish partisans burned his house, his manuscripts, and his school's printing press. Notably, the original manuscript of Comenius' Pansophiæ Prodromus was destroyed in the fire; fortunately, the text had already been printed and thus survived.

=== Quaker books (in Boston) ===
In 1656 the authorities at Boston imprisoned the Quaker women preachers Ann Austin and Mary Fisher, who had arrived on a ship from Barbados. Among other things they were charged with "bringing with them and spreading here sundry books, wherein are contained most corrupt, heretical, and blasphemous doctrines contrary to the truth of the gospel here professed amongst us" as the colonial gazette put it. The books in question, about a hundred, were publicly burned in Boston's Market Square.

=== Pascal's "Lettres provinciales" (by King Louis XIV) ===
As part of his intensive campaign against the Jansenists, King Louis XIV of France in 1660 ordered the book "Lettres provinciales" by Blaise Pascal – which contained a fierce defense of the Jansenist doctrines – to be shredded and burnt. Despite Louis XIV absolute power in France, this decree proved ineffective. "Lettres provinciales" continued to be clandestinely printed and disseminated, eventually outliving the Jansenist controversy which gave it birth and becoming recognized as a masterpiece of French prose.

=== Hobbes books (at Oxford University) ===
In 1683 several books by Thomas Hobbes and other authors were burnt in Oxford University.

=== Mythical (and/or mystical) writings of Moshe Chaim Luzzatto (by rabbis) ===
During the 1720s rabbis in Italy and Germany ordered the burning of the kabbalist writings of the then young Moshe Chaim Luzzatto. The Messianic messages which Luzzatto claimed to have gotten from a being called "The Maggid" were considered heretical and potentially highly disruptive of the Jewish communities' daily life, and Luzzatto was ordered to cease disseminating them. Though Luzzatto in later life got considerable renown among Jews and his later books were highly esteemed, most of the early writings were considered irrevocably lost until some of them turned up in 1958 in a manuscript preserved in the Library of Oxford.

=== Protestant books and Bibles (by Archbishop of Salzburg) ===
In 1731 Count Leopold Anton von Firmian – Archbishop of Salzburg as well as its temporal ruler – embarked on a savage persecution of the Lutherans living in the rural regions of Salzburg. As well expelling tens of thousands of Protestant Salzburgers, the Archbishop ordered the wholesale seizure and burning of all Protestant books and Bibles.

=== Amalasunta (by Carlo Goldoni) ===
In 1733, Venetian playwright Carlo Goldoni burned his tragedy Amalasunta due to negative reception by his audiences.

=== Writings of Johann Christian Edelmann (by Imperial authorities in Frankfurt) ===
In 1750, the Imperial Book Commission of the Holy Roman Empire at Frankfurt/Main ordered the wholesale burning of the works of Johann Christian Edelmann, a radical disciple of Spinoza who had outraged the Lutheran and Calvinist clergies by his Deism, his championing of sexual freedom and his asserting that Jesus had been a human being and not the Son of God. In addition, Edelmann was also an outspoken opponent of royal absolutism. With Frankfurt's entire magistracy and municipal government in attendance and seventy guards to hold back the crowds, nearly a thousand copies of Edelmann's writings were tossed on to a tower of flaming birch wood. Edelmann himself was granted refuge in Berlin by Friedrich the Great, but on condition that he stop publishing his views.

=== Works of Voltaire ===
At first, the French philosopher Voltaire's arrival at the court of King Frederick the Great was a great success. However, in late 1751, king and philosopher quarreled over Voltaire's pamphlet Doctor Akakia (French: Histoire du Docteur Akakia et du Natif de St Malo), a satirical essay of a very biting nature directed against Maupertuis, the president of the Royal Academy of Sciences at Berlin – whom Voltaire considered a pretentious pedant. It so excited the anger of King Frederick, the patron of the academy, that he ordered all copies to be seized and burnt by the common hangman. The order was effective in Prussia, but the King could not prevent some 30,000 copies being sold in Paris. In the aftermath, Voltaire had to leave Prussia, though he and King Frederick were later reconciled.

Voltaire's works were burnt several times in pre-revolutionary France. In his Lettres philosophique, published in Rouen in 1734, he described British attitudes toward government, literature, and religion, and clearly implied that the British constitutional monarchy was better than the French absolute one – which led to the book being burned.

Later, Voltaire's Dictionnaire philosophique, which was originally called the Dictionnaire philosophique portatif, had its first volume, consisting of 73 articles in 344 pages, burnt upon release in June 1764.

An "economic pamphlet", Man With Forty Crowns, was ordered to be burnt by the Parlement of Paris, and a bookseller who had sold a copy was pilloried. It is said that one of the magistrates on the case exclaimed, "Is it only his books we shall burn?"

=== Books that offended Qianlong Emperor ===
China's Qianlong Emperor (1711–1799) embarked on an ambitious program – the Complete Library of the Four Treasuries (or Siku Quanshu), largest compilation of books in Chinese history (possibly in human history in general). The enterprise included, however, also the systematic banning and burning of books considered "unfitting" to be included – especially those critical, even by subtle hints, of the ruling Qing dynasty. During this Emperor's nearly sixty years on the throne, the destruction of about 3000 "evil" titles (books, poems, and plays) was decreed, the number of individual copies confiscated and destroyed is variously estimated at tens of thousands or even hundreds of thousands. As well as systematically destroying the written works, 53 authors of such works were executed, in some cases by lingering torture or along with their family members. A famous earlier Chinese encyclopedia, Tiangong Kaiwu (Chinese: 天工開物) was included among the works banned and destroyed at this time, and was long considered to be lost forever – but some original copies were discovered, preserved intact, in Japan. The Qianlong Emperor's own masterpiece – the Complete Library of the Four Treasuries, produced only in seven hand-written copies – was itself the target of later book burnings: the copies kept in Zhenjiang and Yangzhou were destroyed during the Taiping Rebellion, and in 1860, during the Second Opium War an Anglo-French expedition force burned most of the copy kept at Beijing's Old Summer Palace. The four remaining copies, though suffering some damage during World War II, are still preserved at four Chinese museums and libraries.

=== Anti-Wilhelm Tell tract (Canton of Uri) ===
The 1760 tract by Simeon Uriel Freudenberger from Luzern, arguing that Wilhelm Tell was a myth and the acts attributed to him had not happened in reality, was publicly burnt in Altdorf, capital of the Swiss canton of Uri – where, according to the legend, William Tell shot the apple from his son's head.

=== Vernacular Catholic hymn books (at Mainz) ===
In 1787, an attempt by the Catholic authorities at Mainz to introduce vernacular hymn books encountered strong resistance from conservative Catholics, who refused to abandon the old Latin books and who seized and burned copies of the new German language books.

=== Libro d'Oro (in the French-ruled Ionian Islands) ===
With the Treaty of Leoben and the Treaty of Campo Formio in 1797, the French Republic gained the Ionian Islands, hitherto ruled by the Venetian Republic. France proceeded to annex the islands, organize them as the départements of Mer-Égée, Ithaque and Corcyre, and introduce there the principles and institutions of the French Revolution – initially getting great enthusiasm among the islands' inhabitants. The abolition of aristocratic privileges was accompanied by the public burning of the Libro d'Oro – formal directory of nobles in the Republic of Venice which included those of the Ionian Islands.

== Industrial Revolution period ==
=== "The Burned Book" (by Rabbi Nachman of Breslov) ===
In 1808, Rabbi Nachman of Breslov burned the only copy or copies of one of his own books for an unknown reason. Many Hasidic Jews continue to search for "The Burned Book," as they call it.

=== Records of the Goa Inquisition (by Portuguese colonial authorities) ===
In 1812 the Goa Inquisition was suppressed, after hundreds of years in which it had been enacting various kinds of religious persecution in the Portuguese colony of Goa, India. In the aftermath, most of the Goa Inquisition's records were destroyed – a great loss to historians, making it is impossible to know the exact number of the Inquisition's victims.

=== Code Napoléon (by German Nationalist students) ===
On October 18, 1817, about 450 students, members of the newly founded German Burschenschaften ("fraternities"), came together at Wartburg Castle to celebrate the German victory over Napoleon two years before, condemn conservatism and call for German unity. The Code Napoléon as well as the writings of German conservatives were ceremoniously burned 'in effigy': instead of the costly volumes, scraps of parchment with the titles of the books were placed on the bonfire. Among these was August von Kotzebue's History of the German Empires. Karl Ludwig Sand, one of the students participating in this gathering, would assassinate Kotzebue two years later.

=== William Blake manuscripts (by Frederick Tatham) ===
The poet William Blake died in 1827, and his manuscripts were left with his wife Catherine. After her death in 1831, the manuscripts were inherited by Frederick Tatham, who burned some that he deemed heretical or politically radical. Tatham was an Irvingite, member of one of the many fundamentalist movements of the 19th century, and opposed to any work that smacked of "blasphemy". At the time, Blake was nearly forgotten, and Tatham could act with impunity. When Blake was re-discovered some decades later and recognized as a major English poet, the damage was already done.

=== Count István Széchenyi's book (by conservative Hungarian nobles) ===
In 1825 Count István Széchenyi came to the fore as a major Hungarian reformer. Though himself a noble, a magnate from one of Hungary's most powerful families, Szechenyi published Hitel (Credit), a book arguing that the nobles' privileges were both morally indefensible and economically detrimental to the nobles themselves. In 1831, angry conservative nobles publicly burned copies of Széchenyi's book.

=== Early braille books (in Paris) ===
In 1842, officials at the school for the blind in Paris were ordered by its new director, Armand Dufau, to burn books written in the new braille code. After every braille book at the institute that could be found was burned, supporters of the code's inventor, Louis Braille, rebelled against Dufau by continuing to use the code, and braille was eventually restored at the school.

=== Libraries of Buddhist monasteries (during the Taiping Rebellion) ===
The Taiping Heavenly Kingdom, established by rebels in South China in 1854, sought to replace Confucianism, Buddhism and Chinese folk religion with the Taiping's version of Christianity, God Worshipping, which held that the Taiping leader Hong Xiuquan was the younger brother of Jesus Christ. As part of this policy, the libraries of the Buddhist monasteries were destroyed, almost completely in the case of the Yangtze Delta area. Temples of Daoism, Confucianism, and other traditional beliefs were often defaced.

Following the suppression of the Taiping Rebellion, the victorious forces of the Qing dynasty engaged in their own extensive destruction of books and records. It is thought that only a tenth of Taiping-published records survive to this day, as they were mostly destroyed by the Qing in an attempt to rewrite the history of the conflict.

=== "The Bonnie Blue Flag" (by Union General Benjamin Butler) ===
During the American Civil War, when Union Major General Benjamin Butler captured New Orleans he ordered the destruction of all copies of the music for the popular Confederate song "The Bonnie Blue Flag", as well as imposing a $500 fine on A. E. Blackmar who published this music.

=== On the Ancient Cypriots (by Ottoman authorities) ===
Following its publication in 1869, the book On the Ancient Cypriots by Greek Cypriot priest and scholar Ieronymos Myriantheus was banned by the Ottoman Empire, due to its Greek Nationalist tendencies, and 460 copies of it were burned. In a punitive measure towards Myriantheus the Ottomans refused to recognize him as Bishop of Kyrenia.

=== "Lewd" books (by Anthony Comstock and the NYSSV) ===
Anthony Comstock founded the New York Society for the Suppression of Vice (NYSSV) in 1873 and over the years burned 15 tons of books, 284,000 pounds of plate, and almost 4 million pictures. The NYSSV was financed by wealthy and influential New York philanthropists. Lobbying the United States Congress also led to the enactment of the Comstock laws.

=== Pedigrees and books of Muslim law and theology (By the Mahdi in Sudan) ===
After establishing his rule over Sudan in 1885, Muhammad Ahmad, known as the Mahdi, authorized the burning of lists of pedigrees – which, in his view, accentuated tribalism at the expense of religious unity – as well as books of Muslim law and theology because of their association with the old order which the Mahdi had overthrown.

=== Emily Dickinson's correspondence (on her orders) ===
Following the death of noted American poet Emily Dickinson in 1890, her sister Lavinia Dickinson burned almost all of her correspondences in keeping with Emily's wishes, but as it was unclear whether the forty notebooks and loose sheets all filled with almost 1800 poems were to be included in this, Lavinia saved these and began to publish the poems that year.

=== Ivan Bloch's research on Russian Jews (by Tsarist Russian government) ===
In 1901 the Russian Council of Ministers banned a five-volume work on the socio-economic conditions of Jews in the Russian Empire, the result of a decade-long comprehensive statistical research commissioned by Ivan Bloch. (It was entitled "Comparison of the material and moral levels in the Western Great-Russian and Polish Regions"). The research's conclusions – that Jewish economic activity was beneficial to the Empire – refuted antisemitic demagoguery and were disliked by the government, which ordered all copies to be seized and burned. Only a few survived, circulating as great rarities.

=== Forbidden books by Turkish and foreign authors (by the Ottoman government) ===
During the Hamidian period, censorship was enforced, both on Turkish authors such as Namik Kemal or Ziya Pasha as well as foreign authors such as Montesquieu or Rousseau. Books printed without permission of the authorities were seized whenever and wherever they would be found and either sent to the Ministry of Education in Istanbul for burning or burned locally. In May 1902, a burning of 30,000 books took place at the Çemberlitaş Hamamı, including those of celebrated Turkish authors.

=== Italian Nationalist literature (by Austrian authorities in Trieste) ===
In the tense period following the Bosnian crisis of 1908–09, the Austrian authorities in Trieste cracked down on the Italian Irredentists in the city, who were seeking to end Austrian rule there and annex Trieste to Italy (which would actually happen ten years later, at the end of World War I). A very large quantity of Italian-language books and periodicals whose contents were deemed "subversive" were confiscated and consigned to destruction. The authorities had the condemned material meticulously weighted, it was found to measure no less than 4.7 metric tons. Thereupon, on February 13, 1909, the books and periodicals were officially burned at the Servola blast furnaces. (Note: The Trieste book burnings are referenced in John Gatt-Rutter's comprehensive biographical work, Italo Svevo, A Double Life (Clarendon Press, Oxford, 1988, Ch. 47, p. 242).) The site of the book burnings was very near the home of the writer Italo Svevo, though Svevo's own works were spared. (Servola is a suburb of Trieste.)

== World War I and interwar era ==
=== Books in Serbian (by World War I Bulgarian Army) ===
In the aftermath of the Serbian defeat in the Serbian Campaign of World War I, the region of Old Serbia came under the control of Bulgarian occupational authorities. Bulgaria engaged in a campaign of cultural genocide. Serbian priests, professors, teachers and public officials were deported into prison camps in pre–war Bulgaria or executed; they were later replaced by their Bulgarian counterparts. The use of the Serbian language was banned. Books in Serbian were confiscated from libraries, schools and private collections to be burned publicly. Books deemed to be of particular value were selected by Bulgarian ethnographers and sent back into Bulgaria.

=== Valley of the Squinting Windows (at Delvin, Ireland) ===
In 1918 the Valley of the Squinting Windows, by Brinsley MacNamara, was burned in Delvin, Ireland. MacNamara never returned to the area, his father James MacNamara was boycotted and subsequently emigrated, and a court case was even sought. The book criticised the village's inhabitants for being overly concerned with their image towards neighbours, and although it called the town "Garradrimna," geographical details made it clear that Delvin was meant.

=== George Grosz's cartoons (by court order in Weimar Germany) ===
In June 1920 the left-wing German cartoonist George Grosz produced a lithographic collection in three editions entitled Gott mit uns. A satire on German society and the counterrevolution, the collection was swiftly banned. Grosz was charged with insulting the army, which resulted in a court order to have the collection destroyed. The artist also had to pay a 300 German Mark fine.

=== Margaret Sanger's Family Limitation (by British court order) ===
In 1923 the anarchist Guy Aldred and his partner and co-worker Rose Witcop, a birth control activist, published together a British edition of Margaret Sanger's Family Limitation – a key pioneering work on the subject. They were denounced by a London magistrate for this "indiscriminate" publication. The two lodged an appeal, strongly supported in their legal struggle by Dora Russell – who, with her husband Bertrand Russell and John Maynard Keynes, paid the legal costs. Despite expert testimony from a consultant to Guy's Hospital and evidence at the appeal that the book had only been sold to those aged over twenty-one, the court ordered the entire stock to be destroyed.

=== Theodore Dreiser's works (at Warsaw, Indiana) ===
Trustees of Warsaw, Indiana, ordered the burning of all the library's works by local author Theodore Dreiser in 1935.

=== Works of Goethe, Shaw, and Freud (by Metaxas dictatorship in Greece) ===
Ioannis Metaxas, who held dictatorial power in Greece between 1936 and 1941, conducted an intensive campaign against what he considered Anti-Greek literature and viewed as dangerous to the national interest. Targeted under this definition and put to the fire were not only the writings of dissident Greek writers, but even works by such authors as Goethe, Shaw, and Freud.

=== Books, pamphlets and pictures (by Soviet authorities) ===
In his Open Letter to Stalin Old Bolshevik and former Soviet diplomat Fyodor Raskolnikov alleges that Soviet libraries began circulating long lists of books, pamphlets and pictures to be burnt on sight, following Joseph Stalin's ascension to power. Those lists include the names of authors whose works were deemed undesirable. Raskolnikov was surprised to find his work on the October Revolution in one of those lists. The lists contained numerous books from the West which were deemed decadent.

=== Pompeu Fabra's library (by Franco's troops) ===
In 1939, shortly after the surrender of Barcelona, Franco's troops burned the entire library of Pompeu Fabra, the main author of the normative reform of contemporary Catalan language, while shouting "¡Abajo la inteligencia!" (Down with the intelligentsia!)

== 1930s and World War II ==
=== Jewish, anti-Nazi and "degenerate" books (by the Nazis) ===
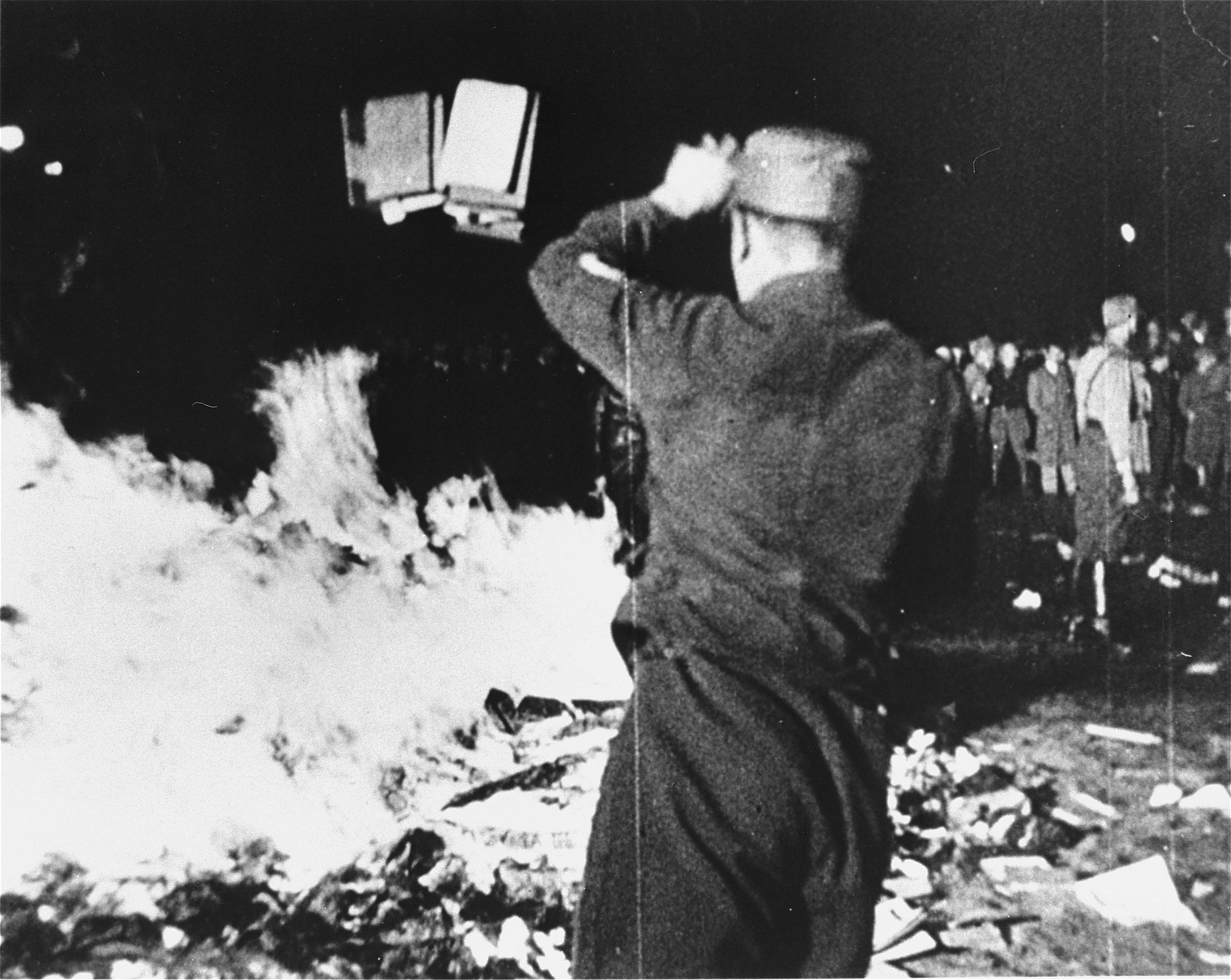
In 1933, Nazis burned works of Jewish authors, and other works considered "un-German", at the library of the Institut für Sexualwissenschaft in Berlin.

The works of some Jewish authors and other so-called "degenerate" books were burned by the Nazis in the 1930s and 1940s. Richard Euringer, director of the libraries in Essen, Germany, identified 18,000 works deemed not to correspond with Nazi ideology, which were publicly burned.

On May 10, 1933, on the Opernplatz in Berlin, SA and Nazi youth groups burned some 25,000 books from the Institut für Sexualwissenschaft and the Humboldt University library. The books that were burned included works by Albert Einstein, Vicki Baum, Bertolt Brecht, Heinrich Heine, Helen Keller, Thomas Mann, Karl Marx, Erich Maria Remarque, Frank Wedekind, Ernest Hemingway and H. G. Wells. Student groups throughout Germany in 34 towns also carried out their own book burnings on that day and in the following weeks. Erich Kästner wrote an ironic account (published only after the fall of Nazism) of having witnessed the burning of his own books on that occasion. Radio broadcasts of the burnings were played in Berlin and elsewhere, and 40,000 turned out to hear Reich Minister of Propaganda Joseph Goebbels make a speech about the acts.

As well as destroying the published works of Lion Feuchtwanger, Nazis at the same time broke into his home, stole and destroyed several manuscripts of his works in progress. Feuchtwanger and his wife were at the time in America, and he survived to continue writing in exile.

In May 1995, Micha Ullman's underground Bibliotek memorial was inaugurated on Bebelplatz square (formerly the Opernplatz) in Berlin, where the Nazi book burnings began. The memorial consists of a window on the surface of the plaza, under which vacant bookshelves are illuminated and visible to visitors. A bronze plaque bears a quote by Heinrich Heine: "Where books are burned in the end people will burn."

=== Jewish books in Alessandria (by pro-Nazi mob) ===
On December 13, 1943, in Alessandria, Italy, a mob of supporters of the German-imposed Italian Social Republic attacked the synagogue of the city's small Jewish community, on Via Milano. Books and manuscripts were taken out of the synagogue and set on fire at Piazza Rattazzi. The burning of the Jewish books was a prelude to a mass arrest and deportation of the Jews themselves. A total of 48 Jews were deported from Alessandria, many of whom were murdered in Auschwitz.

=== André Malraux's manuscript (by the Gestapo) ===
During World War II the French writer and anti-Nazi resistance fighter André Malraux worked on a long novel, The Struggle Against the Angel, the manuscript of which was destroyed by the Gestapo upon his capture in 1944. The name was apparently inspired by the Jacob story in the Bible. A surviving opening part named The Walnut Trees of Altenburg, was published after the war.

=== Manuscripts and books in Warsaw, Poland (by the Nazis) ===
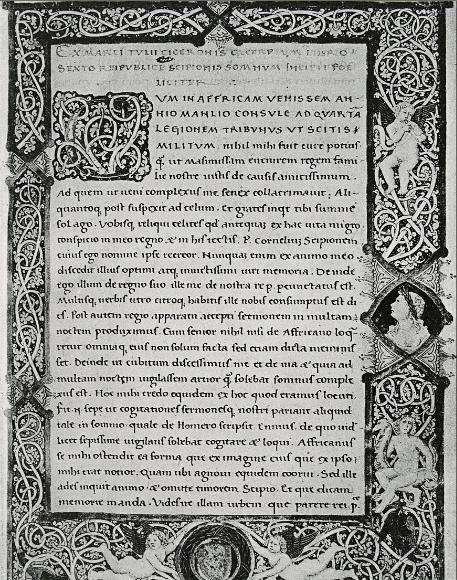
Works of Macrobius, ca. 1470 is one of the books burned by the Germans during the Planned destruction of Warsaw.

The Nazis destroyed much of Warsaw during World War II: an estimated 16 million books, and about 85% of the city's buildings. (Note: 85% of buildings lost: 10% were destroyed in the 1939 Invasion of Poland that ignited World War II, 15% in the reorganization of Warsaw and the Warsaw Ghetto Uprising (1943), 25% in the 1944 Uprising, and 35% due to systematic German actions after the second Uprising.) The libraries of the University of Warsaw and of the Warsaw Institute of Technology were razed. 14 other libraries were completely burned to the ground. German Verbrennungskommandos (Burning detachments) were responsible for much of the targeted attacks on libraries and other centers of knowledge and learning.

In October 1944, the manuscript collection of the National Library of Poland was burned to erase Polish national history.

Part of the Krasiński Library's building was destroyed in September 1939, leading to its collections, which had almost all survived, being moved in 1941. In September 1944, an original collection of 250,000 items was shelled by German artillery, although many books were saved by being thrown out the windows by library staff. In October, what had survived was deliberately burned by the authorities, including 26,000 manuscripts, 2,500 incunables (printed before 1501), 80,000 early printed books, 100,000 drawings and printmakings, 50,000 note and theatre manuscripts, and many maps and atlases.

The Załuski Library – established in 1747 and thus the oldest public library in Poland and one of the oldest and most important libraries in Europe – was burned down during the Uprising in October 1944. Out of about 400,000 printed items, maps and manuscripts, only some 1800 manuscripts and 30,000 printed materials survived. Unlike earlier Nazi book burnings where specific books were deliberately targeted, the burning of this library was part of the general setting on fire of a large part of the city of Warsaw.

The extensive library of the Polish Museum, Rapperswil, founded in 1870 in Rapperswil, Switzerland, had been created when Poland was not a country and was thus moved to Warsaw in 1927. In September 1939, the National Polish Museum in Rapperswil along with the Polish School at Batignolles, lost almost their entire collection during the German bombardment of Warsaw.

=== Books in the National Library of Serbia (by World War II German bomber planes) ===
On April 6, 1941, during World War II, German bomber planes under orders by Nazi Germany specifically targeted the National Library of Serbia in Belgrade. The entire collection was destroyed, including 1,300 ancient Cyrillic manuscripts and 300,000 books.

== Cold War era and 1990s ==
=== The books of Knut Hamsun (in post-World War II Norway) ===
Following the liberation of Norway from Nazi occupation in 1945, angry crowds burned the books of Knut Hamsun in public in major Norwegian cities, due to Hamsun's having collaborated with the Nazis.

=== Post-World War II Germany ===
On May 13, 1946, the Allied Control Council that was in charge of the occupation zones in post-war Germany issued a directive for the confiscation of all works that could potentially contribute to a resurgence of Nazism or militarism. A list was drawn up of more than 30,000 titles, ranging from school textbooks to poetry, which were then banned. All copies of books on the list were to be confiscated and destroyed, and possession of a book on the list was made a punishable offence. The representative of the Military Directorate acknowledged that the order was no different in intent or execution from Nazi book burnings. However, all of the confiscated literature was reduced to pulp instead of being burned.

In August 1946 the order was amended so that "In the interest of research and scholarship, the Zone Commanders (in Berlin the Komendantura) may preserve a limited number of documents prohibited in paragraph 1. These documents will be kept in special accommodation where they may be used by German scholars and other German persons who have received permission to do so from the Allies only under strict supervision by the Allied Control Authority."

=== Books in Kurdish (in north Iran) ===
Following the suppression of the pro-Soviet Kurdish Republic of Mahabad in north Iran in December 1946 and January 1947, members of the victorious Iranian Army burned all Kurdish-language books that they could find, as well as closing down the Kurdish printing press and banning the teaching of Kurdish.

=== Comic book burnings, 1948 ===
In 1948, children – overseen by priests, teachers, and parents – publicly burned several hundred comic books in both Spencer, West Virginia, and Binghamton, New York. Once these stories were picked up by the national press wire services, similar events followed in many other cities.

=== Books by Shen Congwen (by Chinese booksellers) ===
Around 1949, the books that Shen Congwen (pseudonym of Shen Yuehuan) had written in the period 1922–1949 were banned in the Republic of China and both banned and subsequently burned by booksellers in the People's Republic of China.

=== Judaica collection at Birobidzhan (by Stalin) ===
As part of Joseph Stalin's efforts to stamp out Jewish culture in the Soviet Union in the late 1940s and early 1950s, the Judaica collection in the library of Birobidzhan, capital of the Jewish Autonomous Oblast on the Chinese border, was burned.

=== Romanian literature (by the Romanian Workers' Party) ===
In the 1950s, the Romanian Workers' Party had started purging the libraries of the Romanian People's Republic (Romanian: Republica Populară Romînă, RPR), by burning any books mentioning Bessarabia or the Bukovina and German and Italian translations of Romanian literature. The entire contents of the Casa Școalelor had been emptied, with books on national popular culture and religious works were burned. A librarian of the Academy, Barbu Lăzăreanu, was put in charge of maps, documents, photographs, the unique lexicographical file of the Romanian language, which all were proving the Latin origin of Romanian. Displeasing the Slavic committee that had passed on them, they were burned. 762 Romanian literary works were withdrawn from circulation, including those of Liviu Rebreanu, Ioan Alexandru Brătescu-Voinești and Octavian Goga. The purged books and treasures were replaced with millions of books and pamphlets. Cartea Rusă alone issued 3,701,300 copies of Romanian translations of 174 Russian books, with additional 329,050 copies translated in Hungarian, German, Serbian and Turkish. The purging of the books was led by Petre Constantinescu-Iași, Mihai Roller, Barbu Lăzăreanu and Emil Petrovici.

=== Mordecai Kaplan's publications (by Union of Orthodox Rabbis) ===
In 1954, the rabbi Mordecai Kaplan was excommunicated from Orthodox Judaism in the United States, and his works were publicly burned at the annual gathering of the Union of Orthodox Rabbis.

=== Hungarian Revolution of 1956 ===
Communist books were burned by the revolutionaries during the Hungarian Revolution of 1956, when 122 communities reported book burnings.

=== Memoirs of Yrjö Leino (by Finnish government, under Soviet pressure) ===
Yrjö Leino, a Communist activist, was Finnish Minister of the Interior in the crucial 1945–1948 period. In 1948 he suddenly resigned for reasons which remain unclear and went into retirement. Leino returned to the public eye in 1958 with his memoirs of his time as Minister of the Interior. The manuscript was prepared in secret – even most of the staff of the publishing company Tammi were kept in ignorance – but the project was revealed by Leino because of an indiscretion just before the planned publication. It turned out the Soviet Union was very strongly opposed to publication of the memoirs. The Soviet Union's Chargé d'affaires in Finland Ivan Filippov (Ambassador Viktor Lebedev had suddenly departed from Finland a few weeks earlier on October 21, 1958) demanded that Prime Minister Karl-August Fagerholm's government prevent the release of Leino's memoirs. Fagerholm said that the government could legally do nothing, because the work had not yet been released nor was there censorship in Finland. Filippov advised that if Leino's book was published, the Soviet Union would draw "serious conclusions". Later the same day Fagerholm called the publisher, Untamo Utrio, and it was decided that the January launch of the book was to be cancelled. Eventually, the entire print run of the book was destroyed at the Soviet Union's request. Almost all of the books – some 12,500 copies – were burned in August 1962 with the exception of a few volumes which were furtively sent to political activists. Deputy director of Tammi Jarl Hellemann later argued that the fuss about the book was completely disproportionate to its substance, describing the incident as the first instance of Finnish self-censorship motivated by concerns about relations to the Soviet Union. The book was finally published in 1991, when interest in it had largely dissipated.

=== Brazil, military coup, 1964 ===
Following the 1964 Brazilian coup d'état, General Justino Alves Bastos, commander of the Third Army, ordered, in Rio Grande do Sul, the burning of all "subversive books". Among the books he branded as subversive was Stendhal's The Red and the Black. Stendhal's was written in criticism of the situation in France under the reactionary regime of the Restored Bourbon monarchy (1815–1830). Evidently, General Bastos felt some of this could also apply to life in Brazil under the right-wing military junta.

=== Religious, anti-Communist and genealogy books (in the Cultural Revolution) ===
It is the Chinese tradition to record family members in a book, including every male born in the family, who they are married to, etc. Traditionally, only males' names are recorded in the books. During the Cultural Revolution (1966–1976), many such books were forcibly destroyed or burned to ashes, because they were considered by the Chinese Communist Party as among the Four Old Things to be eschewed.

Also many copies of classical works of Chinese literature were destroyed, though – unlike the genealogy books – these usually existed in many copies, some of which survived. Many copies of the Buddhist, Taoist and Confucian books were destroyed, thought to be promoting the "old" thinking.

=== Siné's Massacre (during power struggle in "Penguin Books") ===
In 1965, the British publishing house Penguin Books was torn by an intense power struggle, with chief editor Tony Godwin and the board of directors attempting to remove the company founder Allen Lane. One of the acts taken by Lane in an effort to retain his position was to steal and burn the entire print run of the English edition of Massacre by the French cartoonist Siné, whose content was reportedly "deeply offensive".

=== Beatles burnings – Southern United States, 1966 ===
John Lennon, member of the popular music group The Beatles, sparked outrage from religious conservatives in the Southern 'Bible Belt' states due to his quote 'The Beatles are more popular than Jesus' from an interview he had done in England five months previous to the Beatles' 1966 US Tour (their final tour as a group). Disc Jockeys, evangelists, and the Ku Klux Klan implored the local public to bring their Beatles records, books, magazines, posters and memorabilia to Beatles bonfire burning events.

=== Leftist books in Chile during the Pinochet dictatorship ===
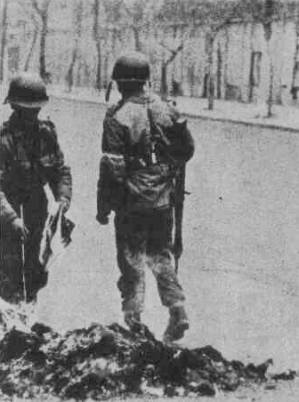
Burning left-wing books during the early days of the Chilean military dictatorship, 1974

After the victory of Augusto Pinochet's forces in the Chilean coup of 1973, bookburnings of Marxist and other works ensued. Journalist Carlos Rama reported in February 1974 that up to that point, destroyed works included: the handwritten Chilean Declaration of Independence by Bernardo O'Higgins, thousands of books of Editora Nacional Quimantú including the Complete Works of Che Guevara, thousands of books in the party headquarters of the Chilean Socialist Party and MAPU, personal copies of works by Marx, Lenin, and anti-fascist thinkers, and thousands of copies of newspapers and magazines favorable to Salvador Allende including Chile Today. In some instances, even books on Cubism were burned because ignorant soldiers thought it had to do with the Cuban Revolution.

=== Books burned by at order of school board in Drake, North Dakota, USA ===
On November 8, 1973, the custodian at Drake's elementary/high school used the school's furnace to burn 32 copies of Kurt Vonnegut's Slaughterhouse Five, at the order of the school board after they "deemed the novel profane and therefore unsuitable for use in class." Other books reported to have been burned were Deliverance by James Dickey, and a short story anthology with stories from Joseph Conrad, William Faulkner, and John Steinbeck.

=== Book burning caused by Viet Cong in South Vietnam ===
Following The Fall of Saigon, Viet Cong gained nominal authority in South Vietnam and conducted several book burnings along with eliminating any cultural forms of South Vietnam. This act of destruction was made since the Vietnamese Communists condemned those values were corruptible ones shaped by "puppet government" (derogatory words to indicate Republic of Vietnam) and American imperialism.

=== From the Noble Savage to the Noble Revolutionary (Venezuela, 1976) ===
In 1976 detractors of Venezuelan liberal writer Carlos Rangel publicly burned copies of his book From the Noble Savage to the Noble Revolutionary in the year of its publication at the Central University of Venezuela.

=== New Testament (Jerusalem, 1980) ===
On March 23, 1980, Yad L'Achim, an Orthodox Jewish counter-missionary organisation that was at the time a beneficiary of subsidies from the Israeli Ministry of Religion, ceremonially incinerated hundreds of copies of the New Testament publicly in Jerusalem. Some people including Israel Shahak protested against this public burning of Christian books.

=== Burning of Jaffna Library ===
Took place on the night of June 1, 1981, when an organized mob of Sinhalese individuals went on a rampage, burning the library to destroy Tamil language Literary works against Tamils. It was one of the most violent examples of ethnic biblioclasm of the 20th century. At the time of its destruction, the library was one of the biggest in Asia, containing over 97,000 books and manuscripts.

=== Sikh Reference Library (Amritsar, 1984) ===
The Sikh Reference Library in Amritsar, a collection of newspapers, and other literary works related sedition, incinerated by Indian troops during the 1984 Operation Blue Star. The missing literature has not been recovered to this day and are presumbed to be lost. The library hosted a vast collection of an estimated 20,000 literary works just before the destruction, including 11,107 books, 2,500 manuscripts, newspaper archives, historical letters, documents/files, and others. Most of the literature was written in the Punjabi-language and related to Sikhism, but there were also Hindi, Assamese, Bengali, Sindhi, English, and French works touching upon various topics.

=== The Satanic Verses (worldwide) ===
The 1988 publication of the novel The Satanic Verses, by Salman Rushdie, was followed by angry demonstrations and riots around the world by followers of political Islam who considered it blasphemous. In the United Kingdom, book burnings were staged in the cities of Bolton and Bradford. In addition, five UK bookstores selling the novel were the target of bombings, and two bookstores in Berkeley, California, were firebombed. The author was condemned to death by various Islamist clerics and lives in hiding.

=== Central University Library (Bucharest, 1989) ===
During the Romanian Revolution of December 1989, the Central University Library of Bucharest was burned down in uncertain circumstances and over 500,000 books, along with about 3,700 manuscripts, were destroyed.

=== The Cholesterol Myths: Exposing the Fallacy That Saturated Fat and Cholesterol Cause Heart Disease by Uffe Ravnskov ===
When The Cholesterol Myths was published in 1991 editors of medical journals simply asked the established health authorities if Ravnskov was correct; when the authorities said no, the editors wrote him off. In Finland the experts actually burned the book on live TV.

=== Oriental Institute in Sarajevo (Bosnia and Herzegovina, 1992) ===
On May 17, 1992, the Oriental Institute in besieged city of Sarajevo, Bosnia and Herzegovina, was targeted by JNA and Serb nationalists artillery, and repeatedly hit with a barrages of incendiary ammunition fired from positions on the hills overlooking the city center. The Institute occupied the top floors of a large, four-storey office block squeezed between other buildings in a densely built neighborhood, with no other buildings being hit. After catching the fire, the institute was completely burned out and most of its collections destroyed by blaze. The collections of the institute were among the richest of its kind, containing Oriental manuscripts centuries old and written about the subjects in wide varieties of fields, in Arabic, Persian, Turkish, Hebrew and local arebica (native Bosnian language written in Arabic script), other languages and many different scripts and in many different geographical location around the world. The losses included 5,263 bound manuscripts, as well as tens of thousands of Ottoman-era documents of various kind. Only about 1% of Institute materials was saved.

=== National and University Library of Bosnia and Herzegovina (1992) ===
On August 25, 1992, the National and University Library of Bosnia and Herzegovina in Sarajevo, Bosnia and Herzegovina was firebombed and destroyed by Serbian nationalists. Almost all the contents of the library were destroyed, including more than 1.5 million books that included 4,000 rare books, 700 manuscripts, and 100 years of Bosnian newspapers and journals.

=== Abkhazian Research Institute of History, Language and Literature and National Library of Abkhazia (by Georgian troops) ===
Georgian troops entered Abkhazia on August 14, 1992, sparking a 14-month war. At the end of October, the Abkhazian Research Institute of History, Language and Literature named after Dmitry Gulia, which housed an important library and archive, was torched by Georgian troops; also targeted was the capital's public library. It seems to have been a deliberate attempt by the Georgian paramilitary soldiers to wipe out the region's historical record.

=== The Nasir-i Khusraw Foundation in Kabul (by the Taliban regime) ===
In 1987, the Nasir-i Khusraw Foundation was established in Kabul, Afghanistan due to the collaborative efforts of several civil society and academic institutions, leading scholars and members of the Ismaili community. This site included video and book publishing facilities, a museum, and a library. The library was a marvel in its extensive collection of fifty-five thousand books, available to all students and researchers, in the languages of Arabic, English, and Pashto. In addition, its Persian collection was unparalleled – including an extremely rare 12th-century manuscript of Firdawsi's epic masterpiece The Book of Kings (Shāhnāma). The Ismaili collection of the library housed works from Hasan-i Sabbah and Nasir-i Khusraw, and the seals of the first Aga Khan. With the withdrawal of the Soviet forces from Afghanistan in the late 1980s and the strengthening of the Taliban forces, the library collection was relocated to the valley of Kayan. However, on August 12, 1998, the Taliban fighters ransacked the press, the museum, the video facilities and the library, destroying some books in the fire and throwing others in a nearby river. Not a single book was spared, including a thousand-year-old Quran.

=== Morgh-e Amin publication house in Tehran (by Islamic extremists) ===
Some days after publishing a novel entitled The Gods Laugh on Mondays by Iranian novelist Reza Khoshnazar, men came at night saying they were Islamic building inspectors and torched the publisher's book shop on or around August 22 or 23, 1995.

== 21st century ==
=== Abu Nuwas poetry (by Egyptian Ministry of Culture) ===
In January 2001, the Egyptian Ministry of Culture ordered the burning of some 6,000 books of homoerotic poetry by the well-known 8th century Persian-Arab poet Abu Nuwas, even though his writings are considered classics of Arab literature.

=== Iraq's national library, Baghdad 2003 ===
Following the 2003 invasion of Iraq, Iraq's national library and the Islamic library in central Baghdad were burned and destroyed by looters. The national library housed rare volumes and documents from as far back as the 16th century, including entire royal court records and files from the period when Iraq was part of the Ottoman Empire. The destroyed Islamic library of Baghdad included one of the oldest surviving copies of the Qur'an.

=== United Talmund Torah School Library, Montreal 2004 ===
On the morning of April 5, 2004, 18-year-old Sleiman El-Merhebi firebombed a school library of the United Talmud Torahs of Montreal, burning its 10,000 volume collection. Reconstruction and other indirect costs amounted to 600,000 Canadian dollars.

=== Dan Brown's The Da Vinci Code, Italy 2006 ===
On May 20, 2006, at noon, two communal Italian councillors, Stefano Gizzi and Massimo Ruspandini, staged a burning of a copy of The Da Vinci Code after the film of the same name premiered, in the square of Italian town Ceccano.

=== The Diary of Anne Frank during a midsummer's party, Germany 2006 ===
On June 24, 2006, a group of men, aged between 24 and 28, threw a United States flag and a copy of The Diary of Anne Frank into a bonfire, first the flag, then the book, during a midsummer's party in German village Pretzien. They were supposedly members of a far-right group called Heimat Bund Ostelbien (East Elbian Homeland Federation), who also organized the party.

=== Harry Potter books ===
There have been several incidents of Harry Potter books being burned, including those directed by churches at Alamogordo, New Mexico, and Charleston, South Carolina, in 2006. More recently books have been burnt in response to J.K. Rowling's comments on Donald Trump, and to protest her gender-critical beliefs.

=== Inventory of Prospero's Books (by proprietors Tom Wayne and W.E. Leathem) ===
On May 27, 2007, Tom Wayne and W.E. Leathem, the proprietors of Prospero's Books, a used book store in Kansas City, Missouri, publicly burned a portion of their inventory to protest what they perceived as society's increasing indifference to the printed word. The protest was interrupted by the Kansas City Fire Department on the grounds that Wayne and Leathem had failed to obtain the required permits.

=== New Testaments in city of Or Yehuda, Israel ===
In May 2008, a "fairly large" number of New Testaments were burned in Or Yehuda, Israel. Conflicting accounts have the deputy mayor of Or Yehuda, Uzi Aharon (of Haredi party Shas), claiming to have organized the burnings or to have stopped them. He admitted involvement in collecting New Testaments and "Messianic propaganda" that had been distributed in the city. The burning apparently violated Israeli laws about destroying religious items.

=== Non-approved Bibles, books and music in Canton, North Carolina ===
The Amazing Grace Baptist Church of Canton, North Carolina, headed by Pastor Marc Grizzard, intended to hold a book burning on Halloween 2009. The church, being a King James Version exclusive church, held all other translations of the Bible to be heretical, and also considered both the writings of Christian writers and preachers such as Billy Graham and T.D. Jakes and most musical genres to be heretical expressions. However, a confluence of rain, oppositional protesters and a state environmental protection law against open burning resulted in the church having to retreat into the edifice to ceremoniously tear apart and dump the media into a trash can (as recorded on video which was submitted to People For the American Way's Right Wing Watch blog); nevertheless, the church claimed that the book "burning" was a success.

=== Bagram Bibles ===
In 2009 the US military burned Bibles in Pashto and Dari that were part of an unauthorized program to introduce Christianity in Afghanistan.

=== 2010–11 Florida Qur'an burning and related burnings ===
On September 11, 2010:

- Fred Phelps burned a Qur'an with the American flag at the Westboro Baptist Church
- Bob Old and another preacher burned a Qur'an in Nashville, Tennessee
- A New Jersey transit worker burned a few pages of a Qur'an at the Ground Zero Mosque in Manhattan
- Burned Qur'ans were found in Knoxville, Tennessee, East Lansing, Michigan, Springfield, Tennessee, and Chicago, Illinois.

=== Operation Dark Heart, memoir by Anthony Shaffer (by the U. S. Dept. of Defense) ===
On September 20, 2010, the Pentagon bought and burned 9,500 copies of Operation Dark Heart, nearly all the first run copies for supposedly containing classified information.

=== Gaddafi's Green Book ===
During the Libyan Civil War, copies of Muammar Gaddafi's Green Book were burned by anti-Gaddafi demonstrators.

=== Suspected Colorado City incident ===
Sometime during the weekend of April 15–17, 2011, books and other items designated for a new public library in the Fundamentalist Church of Jesus Christ of Latter-Day Saints polygamous community Colorado City, Arizona, were removed from the facility where they had been stored and burned nearby. A lawyer for some FLDS members has stated that the burning was the result of a cleanup of the property and that no political or religious statement was intended, however the burned items were under lock and key and were not the property of those who burned them.

=== Lawrence Hill books covers in Amsterdam 2011 ===
On June 22, 2011, a group of Dutch activists torched the cover of Lawrence Hill's The Book of Negroes (translated as Het negerboek in Dutch) in front of the National Slavery Monument (Dutch: Slavernijmonument) of Amsterdam over the use of the term negro in the title, which they found to be offensive. On the same day, Greg Hollingshead, chair of the Writers' Union of Canada called the act "censorship at its worst", while recognizing the sensitivity over the use of the word "negro" in book titles.

=== Qur'ans in Afghanistan ===
On February 22, 2012, four copies of the Qur'an were burned at Bagram Airfield due to being among 1,652 books slated for destruction. The remaining books, which officials claimed were being used for communication among extremists, were saved and put into storage.

=== Akram Aylisli's novels in Azerbaijan ===
The writings of the Azerbaijani novelist Akram Aylisli were burned on February 9, 2013. He was officially stripped of his "People's Writer" title and his presidentially-awarded pension. He wrote about the Armenian Holocaust in ways that were offensive to Azerbaijan.

=== Anti-climate change book at San Jose State University ===
In May 2013, two San Jose State University professors, department chair Alison Bridger, PhD and associate professor Craig Clements, PhD, were photographed holding a match to a book they disagreed with, The Mad, Mad, Mad World of Climatism, by Steve Goreham. The university initially posted it on their website, but then took it down.

=== Theology library purge in North Carolina ===
Traditionalist Catholic seminarians purged a Boone, North Carolina, theology library in 2017 of works they considered heretical, including the writing of Henri Nouwen and Thomas Merton. The books were burned. Parishioners uncomfortable with the radical behavior of local church officials celebrate Catholic mass in an automobile repair shop instead of the church building.

=== Southwestern Ontario schools book burning ===
The Conseil scolaire catholique Providence that oversees elementary and secondary schools in Southwestern Ontario held a "flame purification" ceremony in 2019, burning and burying 5,000 books from 30 Southwestern Ontario French-language schools for depicting racist stereotypes of Indigenous peoples of the Americas. Tintin in America and Asterix and the Great Crossing were among the burned books.

=== Harry Potter and other books ===
On March 31, 2019, a Catholic priest in Gdańsk, Poland, burned books such as Harry Potter and novels in the Twilight series. The other objects were an umbrella with a Hello Kitty pattern, an elephant figurine, a tribal mask and a figurine of a Hindu god.

=== Zhenyuan, China ===
In October 2019, officials at a library in the Gansu Province reportedly burned 65 books that were banned by the regime.

=== Harrison's Principles of Internal Medicine by an Iranian cleric ===
In January 2020, a video of Abbas Tabrizian's ceremony went viral on social media, in which he set a copy of Harrison's Principles of Internal Medicine on fire with lighter. Tabrizian is an Iranian Shia cleric rejecting medicine and promoting instead "Islamic medicine". Iranian officials and authorities of Shia seminaries condemned the act.

=== Tennessee Global Vision Bible Church book burning and subsequent Bible burning ===
On February 2, 2022, Pastor Greg Locke of the Global Vision Bible Church in Mount Juliet, Tennessee, led a book burning event with attendees also throwing books and other media into the fire. The burning was livestreamed on Facebook. Locke claimed it was his and the churches "biblical right" to "burn....cultic materials that they deem are a threat to their religious rights and freedoms and belief systems." On Instagram, Locke wrote that "anything tied to the Masonic Lodge needs to be destroyed."

On Easter Sunday, March 31, 2024, a trailer with about 200 Bibles was set on fire blocking the entrance to the church.

=== Russian-Ukrainian war ===
In Mariupol, Russians burned all the books from the library of the church of Petro Mohyla. In the temporarily occupied Mariupol, Russian invaders threw away books from the library collections of the Pryazovskyi State Technical University.

=== Quran burnings in Sweden ===
After a series of Quran burnings in Sweden by right-wing nationalist Rasmus Paludan, more individuals started emulating him (including in the Netherlands), leading to further Quran burnings under police protection. These incidents attracted international attention and ignited a global debate on freedom of expression.

== See also ==
- List of books banned by governments
- List of destroyed libraries
- Book burning
- Censorship
- Lost literary work
