= Uffe Ravnskov =

Danish scientist

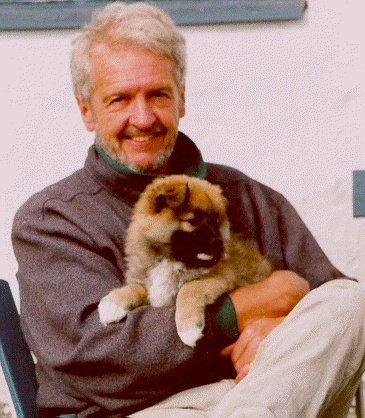
- Ravnskov, c. 2005
- Born: 1934; Copenhagen, Denmark
- Occupation(s): Medical doctor, independent researcher, and a former assistant professor and medical practitioner
- Website: http://www.ravnskov.nu/

Uffe Ravnskov (born 1934) is a Danish medical doctor, independent researcher, and a former assistant professor and medical practitioner in Denmark and Sweden. In recent years, he has become known for querying the scientific consensus regarding the lipid hypothesis.

== Early career ==
Ravnskov was born in Copenhagen, Denmark, and received his medical doctorate from the University of Copenhagen in 1961. Over the following seven years, he worked at various surgical, roentgenological, neurological, paediatric, and medical departments in Denmark and Sweden. He then began scientific studies at the Departments of Nephrology and Clinical Chemistry at the Lund University Hospital in Lund, Sweden.

He was awarded his doctorate of philosophy (specialising in internal medicine and nephrology) there in 1973, and was assistant professor at the university's Department of Nephrology from 1975-79. From 1979, he has been an independent researcher with no university affiliation. He resides in Lund, Sweden.

== Research in nephrology ==
In his 1973 PhD. thesis, On Renal Handling of Serum Proteins, Ravnskov introduced the albumin/creatinine clearance ratio, a way to measure proteinuria. His major research interest concerns the association between hydrocarbon exposure and glomerulonephritis; this interest was sparked by a 1975 paper in The Lancet by Stephen W. Zimmerman, K. Groehler, and G.J. Beirne, who found that the large majority of their patients with glomerulonephritis on dialysis treatment had prior heavy exposure to industrial solvents.

== Investigation of the lipid hypothesis ==
When the lipid hypothesis came to be promoted strongly in Sweden Ravnskov felt there was an incongruity between the Diet-Heart Idea and scientific literature he could recall. In Ravnskov's words,

When the cholesterol campaign was introduced in Sweden in 1989, I was very surprised. Having followed the scientific literature about cholesterol and cardiovascular disease superficially for a number of years, I could not recall any study showing that high cholesterol was dangerous to the heart or the blood vessels, or that any type of dietary fat was more beneficial or harmful than another one. I became curious and started to read more systematically.

He reexamined data from past scientific studies, and came to the conclusion that the scientific foundations of the Diet-Heart Idea were scientifically flawed, with what he characterized as all the "inaccuracies, misinterpretations, exaggerations and misleading quotations in this research area." His book Kolesterolmyten ("The Cholesterol Myths") was subsequently published in Sweden in 1991 and in Finland in 1992. It received adverse attention from the local media when they consulted the researchers and health authorities that it criticized.

With the popularisation of the internet in the late 1990s, Ravnskov saw the opportunity to publicize his conclusion and, in 1997, published selected sections of The Cholesterol Myths on the world wide web. According to the search engine Direct Hit (since acquired by Ask.com in 1999), his website soon became ranked as one of the top ten most popular websites about cholesterol. As a result of this interest, his book was translated into English and published in the United States as The Cholesterol Myths: Exposing the Fallacy that Saturated Fat and Cholesterol cause Heart Disease in September 2000 by a publishing house established by the head of the Weston A. Price Foundation, Sally Fallon. It was later published in Germany in 2002 under the title Mythos Cholesterin. Die zehn größten Irrtümer ("Cholesterol Myth: The Ten Biggest Errors").

Since 1990, Ravnskov has published over 80 scientific papers critical of the Diet-Heart Idea, proposing new hypotheses and also contending that "the successful dissemination of the diet-heart idea is due to authors systematically ignoring or misquoting discordant (contradictory) studies". He was the first to suggest that the positive effect of the statins may be due to other effects than cholesterol-lowering.

== Criticism ==
In a commentary published in the British Journal of Nutrition, Jan I. Pedersen et al. criticize the main point of twenty years worth of Ravnskov's Letters to the Editor, namely, that the value of lowering cholesterol is not proven. In the commentary, they state that Ravnskov et al. disregard well-designed studies showing the link between cholesterol intake and lipid blood levels as well as cholesterol's causal relationship to atherosclerosis. In their critique, they refer readers to other responses by reputable scientists which, according to them, show that Ravnskov's arguments are often faulty.

In the Swedish journal Läkartidningen, Olov Wiklund thoroughly criticized the argumentation of Ravnskov in his book Fat and Cholesterol are Good for You. Wiklund contends that Ravnskov bases major arguments on poorly designed studies, e.g. lacking control groups. Furthermore, he criticizes Ravnskov for disregarding the complexity of biological associations, misinterpreting study results as a result of his expecting linear relationships. In the same paper Ravnskov later published a response where he stated that Wiklund inadequately interprets others', as well as Wiklund's own, science. In a final comment, Wiklund states that Ravnskov's dismissal of his critique shows their fundamental differences in interpreting science, suggesting that Ravnskov unduly modifies the message of scientific articles.

== Awards and organisations ==
Ravnskov has received the Skrabanek Award in 1999 from Trinity College, Dublin (Ireland), for original contributions in the field of medical scepticism.

He is a member of the free panel of the Journal of the Swedish Medical Association (the medical journal Läkartidningen), and the International Science Oversight Board. He is the spokesman for THINCS (The International Network of Cholesterol Skeptics).

== Selected publications ==
- The Cholesterol Myths: Exposing the Fallacy that Saturated Fat and Cholesterol Cause Heart Disease (2000)
- Fat and Cholesterol are Good for You (2009)
