= Phillip Adams (writer) =

Australian humanist

Phillip Adams AC, FAHA, FRSA
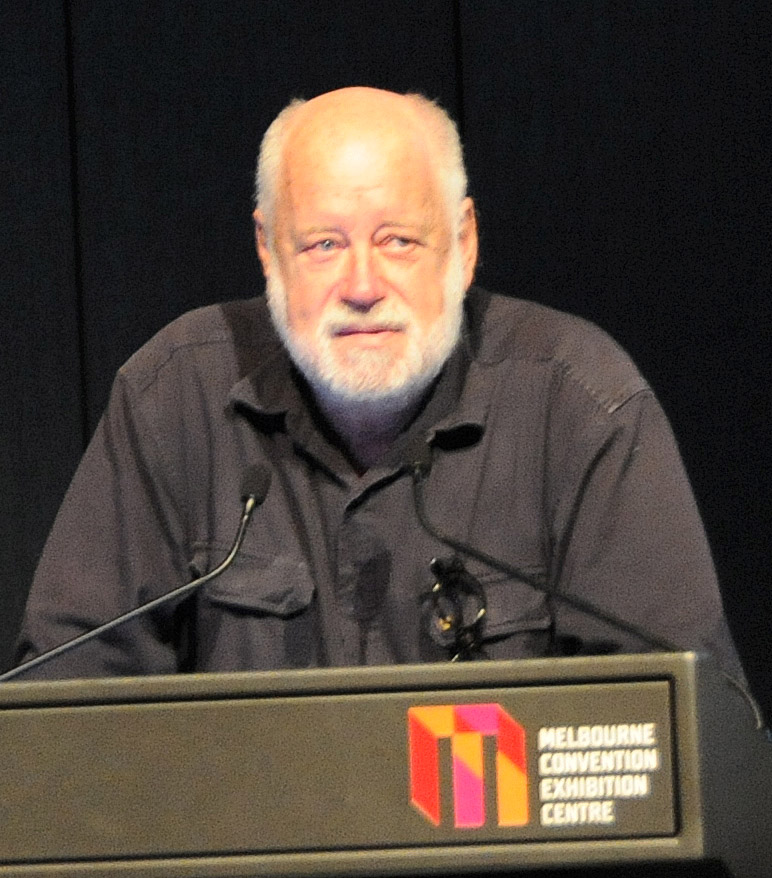
- Adams speaking at the 2010 Global Atheist Convention
- Born: Phillip Andrew Hedley Adams; 12 July 1939 (age 87); Maryborough, Victoria, Australia
- Occupations: Film producer; journalist; broadcaster; former advertising executive
- Known for: Revival of Australian cinema; Public intellectualism
- Spouses: Rosemary Fawcett (divorced): Patrice Newell

Phillip Andrew Hedley Adams (born 12 July 1939) is an Australian humanist, social commentator, former broadcaster, public intellectual, and farmer. He hosted Late Night Live, an Australian Broadcasting Corporation (ABC) program on Radio National from 1991 to 2024.

Adams has had careers in advertising and film production and has served on many non-profit boards including WikiLeaks, Greenpeace Australia, Ausflag, Care Australia, Film Victoria, National Museum of Australia, both the Adelaide and Brisbane festivals of ideas, the Montsalvat Arts Society and the Don Dunstan Foundation. As a young man he joined the Communist Party of Australia, and was a member of the Australian Labor Party for fifty years.

Adams has been appointed a Member and subsequently an Officer, then a Companion of the Order of Australia; and he has received numerous awards including six honorary doctorates from Australian universities; Republican of the Year 2005; the Senior ANZAC Fellowship; the Australian Humanist of the Year, the Gold Lion at Cannes Lions Festival; the Longford Award; a Walkley Award; and the Henry Lawson Australian Arts Award. In 1997 the International Astronomical Union named a minor planet orbiting the Sun between Mars and Jupiter after him. A National Trust poll elected him one of Australia's 100 national living treasures.

== Early years ==
Phillip Andrew Hedley Adams was born in Maryborough, Victoria, the only child of an English-born Congregational Church minister, the Reverend Charles Adams. His childhood was anything but idyllic and his parents separated when he was young. Interviewed in 2006, Adams said that:

My first memories were my mother ... absolutely dependent on the begging bowl – that little round dish with a piece of cloth at the bottom where parishioners would put a couple of bob. When dad went off to the war, I was taken up by my grandparents ... and lived on a dirt-poor farm ... I lived in penury for the first 10, 15 years of my life. ... Mother dumped [my father] in favour of a rather sleazy businessman ... a sociopath who tried to murder me ... I spent the latter part of my childhood trying to protect my mother from this psycho.

Of his education he has said: "I was forced to leave school before completing my secondary education and the only job I could get was working in advertising."

Adams joined the Communist Party of Australia at age 16, while employed in advertising, but left at age 19. In a 2015 article for The Australian, Adams wrote that the Australian Security Intelligence Organisation (ASIO) opened a file on him when he was 15 as a "radicalised teenager ... Having replaced scouting’s woggle and knots with Stalin’s hammer and sickle."

After his time in the communist movement, Adams joined the Australian Labor Party, parting only after what he described in 2010 as "50 years of membership, through thick and thin".

== Career ==
Adams began his advertising career with Briggs & James and, later, with Brian Monahan and Lyle Dayman, became a partner in the agency Monahan Dayman Adams. He developed successful campaigns such as Life. Be in it., Slip, Slop, Slap, Spirit of Australia for Qantas, Break down the Barriers for the International Year of Disabled Persons and Care for Kids for the International Year of the Child, working with talent such as Fred Schepisi, Alex Stitt, Peter Best, Robyn Archer and Mimmo Cozzolino. Adams left the advertising industry in the 1980s.

He wrote regular columns for The Age, The Australian, The Sydney Morning Herald, The National Times, Nation Review, The Courier-Mail, The Advertiser (Adelaide), The Examiner (Tasmania), The Bulletin and was a contributor to the New York Times, the Financial Times and The Times. Until December 2025, he wrote a weekly column for The Australian.

=== Film work ===
Adams played a key role in the revival of the Australian film industry during the 1970s. He was the author of a 1969 report which led to legislation by prime minister John Gorton in 1970 for an Australian Film and Television Development Corporation (later the Australian Film Commission) and the Experimental Film Fund.

Together with Barry Jones, Adams was a motivating force behind the Australian Film Television and Radio School which was established under the Whitlam government. Adams played a key role in the development of the South Australian Film Corporation, which was created in 1972 and became a model for similar bodies in other Australian states; and in the establishment of the Australia Council and the Australian Film Development Corporation, later known as the Australian Film Commission, the Film Finance Corporation Australia, and Screen Australia. As head of delegation to the Cannes Film Festival, Adams signed Australia's first co-production agreements with France and the UK. He was Chairman of the Australian Film Institute, the Film and Television Board of the Australia Council, the Australian Film Commission, and Film Australia.

In the 1960s Adams co-wrote, co-produced and co-directed (as well as serving as cinematographer for) his first feature film Jack and Jill: A Postscript (1969); the first feature to win the AFI Award, and the first Australian film to win the Grand Prix at an international festival.

Adams produced or co-produced other features including the critically panned but hugely popular film adaptation of Barry Humphries' The Adventures of Barry McKenzie, directed by Bruce Beresford, which became the most successful Australian film ever made up to that time. Other films include The Naked Bunyip, Don's Party, The Getting of Wisdom, Lonely Hearts, We of the Never Never, Grendel Grendel Grendel, Fighting Back, Hearts and Minds and Abra Cadabra.

=== Broadcasting ===
Adams initially presented a late-night program on Sydney commercial radio station 2UE during the late 1980s and early 1990s before succeeding Virginia Bell in 1991 as presenter of ABC Radio National's Late Night Live, interviewing guests on a wide range of topics including politics, science, philosophy, history and culture. Late Night Live is broadcast across Australia on ABC Radio National, as well as on Radio Australia and the Internet. The program is broadcast live Monday to Thursday from 22:00 AEST/AEDT and is repeated the following day at 15:00 AEST/AEDT. A serious discussion of world issues, the program is tempered with Adams' gentle and ironic humour. Regular contributors include Bruce Shapiro and Beatrix Campbell. Phillip's last episode was broadcast on 27 June 2024. He was replaced by David Marr.

At times, Adams refers tongue-in-cheek to his listeners as "the listener" or "Gladys", as though he had only one listener; he also refers to listeners collectively as "Gladdies". In more recent years, Adams has begun introducing the show saying "Good evening Gladdies and Poddies", in reference to the show's growing podcast listener base.

The current theme music is the first movement of Brescianello's Violin Concerto No. 4 in E minor, Op. 1. Until March 2016 the theme was a short extract from the "Eliza Aria" from the Wild Swans Concert Suite by Elena Kats-Chernin, performed by the Tasmanian Symphony Orchestra with soprano Jane Sheldon, chosen in 2010. From 2007 to 2010, the theme music was Kats-Chernin's "Russian Rag", which Adams humorously refers to as "The Waltz of the Wombat". The previous music was Bach's Concerto for oboe, violin and orchestra in C minor, BWV 1060: III. Allegro.

=== Other work ===
Adams was the foundation chairman of the Commission for the Future, established by the Hawke government to build bridges between science and the community. He chaired the National Australia Day Council; whose principal task was to choose the Australian of the Year.

Adams was the inaugural chair for the Australian Centre for Social Innovation, established by the South Australian government, and chaired the advisory board for the Centre for the Mind at the University of Sydney and the Australian National University. He has been a board member of Greenpeace, CARE Australia, the National Museum of Australia, The Australian Centre for Social Innovation, the Adelaide Festival of Ideas and Brisbane's Ideas Festival, and is an Ambassador of Bush Heritage Australia and the National Secular Lobby. He was co-founder of the Australian Skeptics.

Adams is the author or editor of more than 20 books, including The Unspeakable Adams, Adams Versus God, The Penguin Book of Australian Jokes, Retreat from Tolerance, Talkback and A Billion Voices, Adams Ark, and, with Lee Burton, Emperors of the Air.

=== Political views and activities ===
Adams is a humanist.

Robert Manne has described Adams as "the emblematic figurehead of the pro-Labor left intelligentsia". After a youth in the Australian Communist movement, Adams was for many years a member of the Australian Labor Party, and had a close relationship with every Labor leader from Gough Whitlam to Kevin Rudd, advising on public relations, advertising and policy issues. In 2010, Adams resigned from the Labor Party after fifty years of membership, dissatisfied with the removal of Rudd by Julia Gillard in the 2010 Labor leadership spill. The Green Left Weekly described Adams in 2011 as "unrepentantly left-wing, although, despite the tireless 71-year-old tearing up his ALP membership card (and voting Green) in 2010, he has not completely abandoned the dead carcass of the ALP that he had lugged around for decades."

In 1995 Adams argued against Section 18C of the Racial Discrimination Act 1975, saying that a better response to expressions of racial hatred was "public debate, not legal censure".

During the tenure of the Howard government, Adams described Liberal Prime Minister John Howard as "far and away the worst prime minister in living memory". In 2022, Adams Tweeted that Australian cricketer Donald Bradman was a "right wing nut job" for being critical of socialism in a letter to Malcolm Fraser following the Dismissal of the Whitlam Labor government. His tweet on the subject was described as racist by one of its targets, Kamahl, and no evidence has been found to support Adams assertion about Nelson Mandela, the opposite seems to be the case.

=== "Honorary white" tweet ===
Adams was accused of using a racist and pejorative term in his response to Kamahl, a Malaysian-born Australian singer, whom Adams referred to on Twitter as an "honorary white". After Kamahl had informed Adams that he had been welcomed at Bradman's home from 1988 until his death in 2001, Adams responded: "Clearly, Kamahl, he made you an Honorary White. Whereas one of the most towering political figures of the 20th century was deemed unworthy of Bradman’s approval.” Adams was referring to the unsubstantiated claims that Bradman had refused to meet Mandela due to political and racial differences, which was contrary to the well-documented respect Mandela had held for Bradman arising from Bradman's staunch opposition to the apartheid regime.

Mandela had asked to meet Bradman during a visit to Sydney in 2000 but due to poor health Bradman was unable to leave Adelaide. However, Bradman did gift a framed photograph which was presented to Mandela by actor Jack Thompson. Bradman died less than six months later.

When ABC managing director David Anderson was asked about Adams' tweet by Senator Ross Cadell in an Australian Senate committees hearing, Anderson said it was his understanding that Adams had privately written to Kamahl to apologise. Kamahl denied this and wrote to Anderson to advise him that he had received no such correspondence from Adams. According to Kamahl, the only action Adams had taken was to block him on Twitter and to double down on his original comments, adding "For the record Mr Anderson, I am not an honorary white man but a very proud black Australian man, deeply insulted by the treatment I have received from your employee and your organisation."

Anderson responded by asking Kamahl to accept his "sincere apologies" as he had been advised that an apology had been sent, but had now asked Adams to convey his apologies to him directly. Although Adams claimed that he had sent a handwritten note to Kamahl two weeks prior, he sent an email to Kamahl in which he wrote: “It pains me deeply that you believe I’ve been both unkind and cruel to you. This stems from a misunderstanding about ‘that tweet’ – intended as a rebuke to Bradman not to you. I regret that my words have been misunderstood and that they have caused you unhappiness". Kamahl rejected the apology, describing it as "arrogant", and asked Adams to apologise publicly on Late Night Live.

== Personal life ==
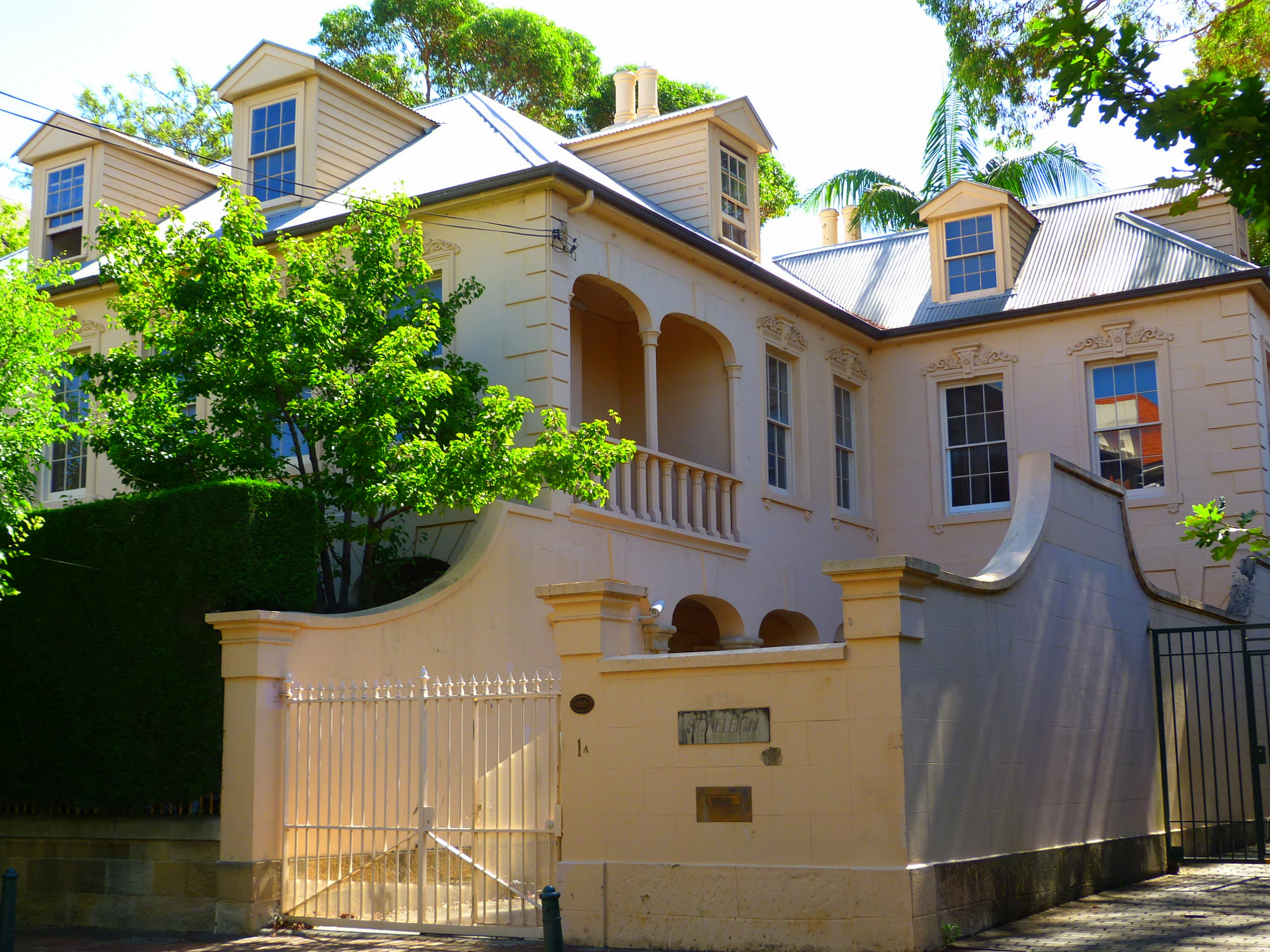
Stoneleigh, Darlinghurst, Adams's former home

Adams is married to Patrice Newell. He has four daughters: three with his first wife, Rosemary Fawcett, and one with Newell. He lives on "Elmswood", a large property near Gundy in the Hunter Valley in mid-northern New South Wales. He and his wife grow garlic and olives, and farm organically fed cattle. He previously had a home in Paddington, an inner suburb of Sydney. Prior to this, Adams lived for some time in Stoneleigh, a heritage-listed house in Darlinghurst. Adams collects antiquities from many "dead civilisations", including sculptures and artifacts of Egyptian, Roman, Greek, Etruscan, South American and other indigenous cultures' origin.

He has written "I'd been an atheist since I was five."

In 1979 a portrait of Adams by artist Wes Walters won the Archibald Prize.

== Honours and awards ==
- Windgrove Laureate (2004)
- Senior ANZAC Fellow (1981)
- Henry Lawson Arts Award (1987)
- United Nations Media Award (2005)
- Multiple AFI Awards for various films
- Honorary Doctor of the University, Griffith University
- Honorary Doctor of Letters, Edith Cowan University (2003)
- Honorary Doctor of Letters, University of Sydney (2005)
- Honorary Doctor of the University, University of South Australia (2010)
- Honorary Doctor of Letters, Macquarie University (2014)
- Australian Media Hall of Fame, 2014
- Honorary Doctorate, Australian Film, Television and Radio School, 2016
- Companion of the Order of Australia (AC) 2025, for "eminent service to broadcast media, to journalism, to the arts, to cultural leadership, and to the community"
- Officer of the Order of Australia (AO) 1992, for service to the Australian film and television industries
- Member of the Order of Australia (AM) 1987, for service to the arts, particularly to film and television
- Living Treasures by the National Trust in 1998
- Walkley Award for Broadcast Journalism (2004)
- Responsibility in Journalism Award 1998 (SCICOP) New York
- Australian Republican of the Year 2005 (Australian Republican Party)
- Australian Humanist of the Year 1987 – Awarded by the Council of Australian Humanist Societies
- Australian Centenary Medal (1 January 2001) "For service to Australian society in journalism"
- Raymond Longford Award (the Australian film industry's highest accolade, in 1981, for "Outstanding Services to the Australian Film Industry"
- A minor planet, discovered by R.H. McNaught at Siding Spring (1990) was named "5133 Phillipadams" by the International Astronomical Union (1997)
- Human Rights Medal awarded by the Australian Government's Human Rights and Equal Opportunity Commission (2006) (Shared with Father Chris Riley)
- In 1996 the Committee for Skeptical Inquiry (CSICOP) presented Adams with the Responsibility in Journalism Award
- Special Award for Services to History awarded by Australian History Association, 2024

== Bibliography ==
- Conversations
- A Billion Voices
- Classic Columns
- Adams Ark
- Adams Versus God
- Retreat from Tolerance
- The Uncensored Adams
- The Inflammable Adams
- The Unspeakable Adams
- More Unspeakable Adams
- Adams with Added Enzymes
- Talkback: Emperors of the Air
- Adams Vs. God: The Rematch (2007)
- Harold Cazneaux: The Quiet Observer
- The Big Questions (with Professor Paul Davies)
- More Big Questions (with Professor Paul Davies)
- Bedtime Stories – Tales from my 21 Years at Late Night Live

- With his partner Patrice Newell, he is the author of several joke books:
  - The Penguin Book of Australian Jokes (1994)
  - The Penguin Book of Jokes from Cyberspace (1995)
  - The Penguin Book of More Australian Jokes (1996)
  - The Penguin Book of Schoolyard Jokes (1997)

== Filmography ==
=== Film ===
- Hearts and Minds (1966) (producer)
- Jack and Jill: A Postscript (1970) (producer, writer, director)
- The Naked Bunyip (1970) (producer)
- The Adventures of Barry McKenzie (1972) (producer)
- Don's Party (1976) (producer)
- The Getting of Wisdom (1978) (producer)
- A Personal History of the Australian Surf (1981) (co-producer)
- Grendel Grendel Grendel (1981) (producer)
- Fighting Back (1982) (executive producer)
- Lonely Hearts (1982) (executive producer)
- We of the Never Never (1982) (executive producer)
- Kitty and the Bagman (1983) (producer)
- Abra Cadabra (1983) (producer)
- Dallas Doll (1994) as Radio Announcer
- Road to Nhill (1997) as God (voice)

=== Television ===
- Adams' Australia (part of BBC TV's contribution to Australia's celebrations for its bicentenary).
- The Big Questions with Professor Paul Davies
- Death and Destiny in Ancient Egypt (writer/presenter) filmed in Egypt with Paul Cox 2008
- More Big Questions with Professor Paul Davies
- Face the Press SBS
- Short Cuts ABC
- Four Corners
- This Day Tonight
- Parkinson
- 7:30 Report
- Clive James
- Will Be Back After This Break (7 Network)
- Two Shot series 1 and 2 (ABC)
- Short and Sweet (2 6-part series, ABC)
- Talking Heads
- Compass
- Sunday
- A Current Affair
- Sixty Minutes
- Australian Story
- Counterpoint with William F. Buckley Jr
- CNNNN
- The Chaser's War on Everything
- Compere, Australian Film Institute Awards Telecast
- Co-presenter, the Australian Bicentennial Celebration
