= Anne Jolliffe =

Australian artist (1933–2021)

Anne Comrie Jolliffe (17 October 1933 – 27 August 2021) was the first Australian woman animator. She was best known for her work on the film Yellow Submarine (1967–68) and the 48th Academy Award winning Great! (1975). Despite having no tertiary training in animation and encountering frequent gender-role opposition in the industry, she still loved working in it and continued to pursue the profession.

== Early life ==
Jolliffe was encouraged to draw by her father when she was four years old. She was very young when she saw her first animated film, a Donald Duck classic, and about eight years old when she saw Fantasia — both of which inspired her to pursue animation. She found entertainment through art and her work was good enough to be published by local newspapers. She moved to live in Melbourne in 1949. There, Jolliffe studied art at Swinburne Technical College and completed a Diploma in the Art of the Book since there were no courses for film and animation. Nevertheless, the course gave her good knowledge in realistic drawing as well as techniques in doing illustration and printing.

== Career ==
After her graduation, Jolliffe worked as an illustrator. Inspired by the English cartoonist Bob Godfrey, she went to London and applied for a job in the animation studio Halas and Batchelor, only to be declined due to gender inequality in workplace that said "women don't animate". However, John Halas sent her a copy of his book How to make animated cartoons when she returned to Melbourne. With the knowledge learnt from that book, she was able to get a position in the animation department at the CSIRO Film Unit, creating scientific and educational films.

In the 1950s, her career in commercial animation took off. She joined the Melbourne-based animation department built by the American company Fanfare Film and GTV9. As a woman in the business – at that stage the only woman in Australia – she needed to "work twice as hard as the men, be twice as good and fight".

After five years at this local studio, she accumulated enough samples of her own work to try going back to London. Fortunately, she reunited with an old friend named Pat Matthews who had a deadline to reach on his work. The meet-up resulted in her landing a place as an animator in Halas and Batchelor. However, after several projects, she realized that she was receiving an unfair pay wage compared to her less-skilled male counterparts; which prompted her to leave the company and move on for secured work with Television Cartoons.

At TVC in the 1960s, Jolliffe worked on two series of The Beatles animated cartoon. Then she and her colleagues continued on the animation for the feature film Yellow Submarine, one of a few that was widely acknowledged in the animation industry. Jolliffe animated the character of Boob and was involved with the "Lucy in the Sky with Diamonds" sequence. For a period of time, Jolliffe was the top paid animator in the city. Jolliffe's son, Ned, was also born during the making of Yellow Submarine. She carried the child to work with her in the studio.

She then later worked for Bob Godfrey. They collaboratively created a film titled Great!, which won the Academy Award for Best Animated Short Film in 1976. Jolliffe was acknowledged as one of the two main directors of the feature.

In 1979, she returned to Melbourne to work for Alex Stitt's films Grendel Grendel Grendel and Abra Cadabra. Later she moved to Sydney to set up Jollification Studio to work on her own projects. However, it was difficult to find funding for animated projects at the time.

While technologies were replacing the traditional 2D hand-drawn animation in the 20th century, Jolliffe was not convinced that it could overshadow the craft completely. Hand-drawn animation was still her preference over computerized animation. She believed computers "can't fully convey the drama of animation".

== Accolades ==
She won the 1976 Academy Award for Best Animated Short Film with Bob Godfrey for the animated feature Great!

== Notable projects ==
Year	Title	Role
1943	Captain Corker	Comic illustrator
1950	The Adventure of Doodle Bug	Comic illustrator
1960s	The Beatles animated cartoons	Animator
1960s	Yellow Submarine	Animator
1975	Great!	Co-director, Animator
1980s	Bunyip	Producer
1980s	The Maitland and Morpeth Film Quartet	Producer
1990s	The Tale of the Space Traveling Housewife	Producer
2002	Whizzbang Hildegard: The Interactive Abbess	Producer

== Gender inequality in work place ==
Jolliffe suffered from gender inequality multiple times during her career as an Australian female animator. She received lower wages than her male counterparts and was told by many, "women don't animate". She was declined a job placement at the Halas and Batchelor Studio in Britain due to her gender. When working for Fanfare Studio in the 1950s, she was assigned employment in the Trace and Paint department instead of the Animation department despite her aspiration for the other option.

However, this mindset gradually shifted during the 1960s when she worked at Television Cartoons (TVC) as an animator on major projects, including Yellow Submarine, and she was not the only female animator. In 1975, she co-directed the Academy Award-winning animated short film 'Great' with Bob Godfrey, which earned her a respected place in the animation industry. She said it was a real triumph for her, to "come from being a woman who 'can't animate'" to winning an Oscar for her animated feature.

Jolliffe set up her own studio in Sydney called Jollification. Some of the animations produced by the studio placed a focus on female characters and women who held a significant place in history, for example, the series of biographies of unsung Australian women, The Tale of the Space Travelling Housewife, Bunyip, etc. She was an inspiration for the next generation of Australian female animators such as Lucinda Clutterbuck, etc.
