= Geoffrey Robertson =

Australian and British lawyer (born 1946)

Geoffrey Robertson AO KC
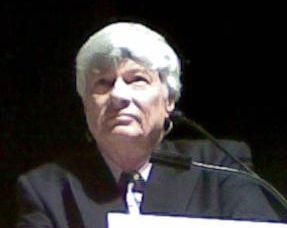
- At the 2009 Ideas Festival in Brisbane, Australia
- Born: Geoff Ronald Robertson; 30 September 1946 (age 80); Sydney, Australia
- Citizenship: Australian, British
- Education: University of Sydney (BA, LLB); University College, Oxford (BCL)
- Occupations: Lawyer; author; broadcaster; academic
- Employer: Doughty Street Chambers
- Title: King's Counsel
- Spouse: Kathy Lette (m. 1990; sep. 2017)
- Children: 2 (including Jules Robertson)

Geoffrey Ronald Robertson (born 30 September 1946) is an Australian and British barrister, academic, author and broadcaster. Robertson is a founder and a former joint head of Doughty Street Chambers. He serves as a Master of the Bench at the Middle Temple, a recorder, and visiting professor at Queen Mary University of London.

== Early life and education ==
Robertson was born in Sydney, Australia, and grew up in the suburb of Eastwood. His father, Frank, survived an RAAF training flight crash in Chiltern, Victoria, in 1943, and went on to be a senior officer of the Commonwealth Bank, and later a stockbroker.

Robertson went to Epping Boys High School and then attended the University of Sydney where he graduated with a Bachelor of Arts degree in 1966 and a Bachelor of Laws degree with first-class honours in 1970. He won a Rhodes Scholarship to study at the University of Oxford where he graduated with a Bachelor of Civil Law degree from University College in 1972. In 2006 he was awarded an honorary degree of Doctor of Laws by the University of Sydney.

== Awards ==
Robertson won the Australian Humanist of the Year award in 2014 for his work as a human rights lawyer and advocate.

== Legal career ==
Robertson became a barrister in 1973 and was appointed Queen's Counsel (QC) in 1988. He became well-known after acting as defence counsel in the celebrated English criminal trials of OZ, Gay News, the ABC trial, The Romans in Britain (the prosecution brought by Mary Whitehouse), Randle and Pottle, the Brighton bombing and Matrix Churchill. He also defended the artist J. S. G. Boggs from a private prosecution brought by the Bank of England regarding his depictions of British currency.

In 1989 and 1990 he led the defence team for Rick Gibson, a Canadian artist, and Peter Sylveire, a director of an art gallery, who were charged with outraging public decency for exhibiting earrings made from human foetuses.

Robertson has also acted in well-known libel cases, including defending The Guardian against Neil Hamilton. He was threatened by terrorists for representing Salman Rushdie.

In 1972 he advised Peter Hain as a McKenzie friend when Hain defended himself on several charge,s including conspiracy to trespass, arising from his involvement in anti-apartheid protests. During the ten-day trial at the Old Bailey, Hain dismissed his QCs but retained Robertson and another as advisers before being convicted and fined £200. Robertson was also employed to defend John Stonehouse after his unsuccessful attempt at faking his own death in 1974.

In March 2000 in the Independent Schools Tribunal, sitting at the Royal Courts of Justice, he successfully defended A. S. Neill's Summerhill School, a private free school. The proceedings were brought by Ofsted on behalf of David Blunkett, the Education Minister, who was seeking the closure of the school. The case was later dramatised by Tiger Aspect Productions in a TV series entitled Summerhill and broadcast on BBC Four and CBBC.

In August 2000, Robertson was retained by the heavyweight boxing champion Mike Tyson for a hearing before the British Boxing Board of Control (BBBoC). The disciplinary hearing related to two counts relating to Tyson's behaviour – failing to stop throwing punches after the referee had stopped the fight – after his 38-second victory over Lou Savarese in Glasgow in June that year. Tyson escaped a ban from fighting in Britain. Robertson successfully deployed a defence of freedom of expression for Tyson, the first use before the BBBoC, but Tyson was convicted on the other count and fined.

In 2002 he defended Dow Jones in Dow Jones & Co Inc v Gutnick, a case where Joseph Gutnick, an Australian mining magnate, sued Dow Jones after an article critical of him was published on the website of Barron's newspaper. Gutnick successfully applied to the High Court of Australia, requesting for the case to be heard in Australia rather than the United States, where the First Amendment protects free speech. Robertson then appealed the case to the United Nations Human Rights Committee. The case was described as a "very worrying decision" as it potentially opened the door for libel cases related to internet publishing to be heard in any country and in multiple countries for the same article.

In December 2002, Robertson was retained by The Washington Post to represent its veteran war correspondent, Jonathan Randal, in The Hague at the United Nations Court, the International Criminal Tribunal for the former Yugoslavia. He established the principle of qualified privilege for the protection of journalists in war crimes courts.

In 2006, Robertson successfully defended The Wall Street Journal (WSJ) in Jameel v Wall Street Journal Europe. The case centred on an article published in the WSJ in 2002, which alleged that the United States were monitoring the bank accounts of a Saudi Arabian businessman to ensure he was not funding terrorists. Jameel, who was represented by Carter-Ruck, was originally awarded £40,000 in damages but this was overturned in favour of the WSJ. The case was viewed by The Lawyer as a landmark case which redefined the earlier case of Reynolds v Times Newspapers Ltd, upholding the right to publish if it is deemed to be in the public interest.

In early 2007, instructed by the Indigenous lawyer Michael Mansell, Robertson took proceedings for Aboriginal Tasmanians to recover 15 sets of their stolen ancestral remains, then being held in the basement of the Natural History Museum in London. He accused the museum of wishing to retain them for "genetic prospecting".

Robertson has appeared in cases before the European Court of Human Rights and in other courts across the world.

Among these, Robertson was involved in the defence of Michael X in Trinidad and has appeared for the defence in a libel case against the former Singaporean prime minister Lee Kuan Yew. He was also involved in the controversial inquest of Helen Smith and also in the Blom-Cooper Commission inquiry into the smuggling of guns from Israel through Antigua to Colombia.

Robertson has been on several human rights missions on behalf of Amnesty International, including to Mozambique, Venda, Czechoslovakia, Malawi, Vietnam and South Africa.

Until 2007 he sat as an appeal judge at the UN Special Court for Sierra Leone.

In 2010, Robertson unsuccessfully defended Julian Assange, the founder of WikiLeaks, in extradition proceedings in the United Kingdom.

In 2013, Robertson was appointed an honorary associate of the National Secular Society.

On 28 January 2015 he represented Armenia with barrister Amal Clooney at the European Court of Human Rights (ECHR) in the Perinçek v. Switzerland case. He called Doğu Perinçek a "vexatious litigant pest" at the ECHR hearing.

From 2016, Robertson has been representing former Brazilian president Lula da Silva with appeals to the United Nations Human Rights Committee regarding Lula's treatment by the Brazilian justice system.

Robertson is a patron of the Media Legal Defence Initiative.

== Media career ==
Since 11 March 1984, often with long intervals in between, Robertson has hosted the Australian television series Geoffrey Robertson's Hypotheticals on ABC TV. These shows invite notable people, often including former and current political leaders, to discuss contemporary issues by assuming imagined identities in hypothetical situations. Robertson published printed collections of these in 1986 and 1991. In 2022, the Hypothetical "All at Sea" was staged at the Darling Harbour Theatre in Sydney and later broadcast by Radio National. Further stage shows were presented around Australia in 2024.

He speaks at public events including many literary festivals. In 2009 he spoke at the Ideas Festival in Brisbane, Australia. Robertson appeared several times on the Australian panel discussion program Q+A, firstly in 2010 on a special program from the Festival of Dangerous Ideas.

== Writing career ==
Robertson has written many books. One of them, The Justice Game (1998), is on the school curriculum in New South Wales, Australia.

His 2005 book The Tyrannicide Brief: The Story of the Man Who Sent Charles I to the Scaffold details the story of John Cooke, who prosecuted Charles I of England in the treason trial that led to his execution. After the Stuart Restoration, Cooke was convicted of high treason and hanged, drawn and quartered.

In his 2006 revision of Crimes Against Humanity, Robertson deals in detail with human rights, crimes against humanity and war crimes. The book starts with the history of human rights and has several case studies such as the case of General Augusto Pinochet of Chile, the Balkans Wars, and the 2003 Iraq War. His views on the United States' atomic bombings of Hiroshima and Nagasaki in Japan can be considered controversial. He considers the Hiroshima bomb was certainly justified, and that the second bomb on Nagasaki was most probably justified but that it might have been better if it was dropped outside a city. His argument is that the bombs, while killing more than 100,000 civilians, were justified because they pushed Emperor Hirohito of Japan to surrender, thus saving the lives of hundreds of thousands of allied forces, as well as Japanese soldiers and civilians.

In his 2010 book, The Case of the Pope, Robertson claims that Pope Benedict XVI was guilty of protecting paedophiles because the church swore victims to secrecy and moved perpetrators in Catholic Church sex abuse cases to other positions where they had access to children while knowing the perpetrators were likely to reoffend. This, Robertson believes, constitutes the crime of assisting underage sex and when he was still Cardinal Ratzinger, the retired pope approved this policy up to November 2002. In Robertson's opinion, the Vatican is not a sovereign state and popes are not immune from prosecution.

In An Inconvenient Genocide: Who Now Remembers the Armenians? (2014), Robertson presents an argument based on fact, evidence and his knowledge of international law, claiming that the horrific events that occurred in 1915 constitute genocide.

In World of War Crimes: Eyeless in Gaza… and Beyond (2025), Robertson argued that the rise of amoral authoritarian leaders such as Vladimir Putin, Donald Trump and Benjamin Netanyahu is leading to international humanitarian law becoming increasingly ineffective or ignored, undermining the basis for democracy.

In April 2026 he wrote about the arrest of Ben Roberts-Smith for alleged war crimes against Afghans, arguing that it showed that the "legacy of Nuremberg is not dead" despite what he described as the Trump and Netanyahu administrations turning a blind eye to war crimes committed by their own forces.

In June 2026 he wrote in the Guardian that the sentencing of the Filton 4 defendants as terrorists violated a basic principle of justice - namely that defendants should be sentenced for the crimes that the jury has convicted them of, not for a crime of terrorism that was never charged or put to the jury.

== Personal life ==
In 1990, Robertson married the author Kathy Lette. They lived in London with their children until their separation in 2017. They had met in 1988 during the filming of an episode of Hypothetical for ABC Television; Robertson was dating Nigella Lawson at the time and Lette was married to Kim Williams. In Robertson's 2010 Who's Who entry, his hobbies are listed as tennis, opera and fishing.

Robertson became a British citizen in 2003.

== Bibliography ==
- Reluctant Judas, Temple-Smith, 1976
- Obscenity, Weidenfeld & Nicolson, 1979
- People Against the Press, Quartet, 1983
- Geoffrey Robertson's Hypotheticals, Angus & Robertson, 1986
- Does Dracula Have Aids?, Angus & Robertson, 1987
- Geoffrey Robertson's Hypotheticals – A New Collection, ABC, 1991
- Freedom the Individual and the Law, Penguin, 1993 (7th ed)
- The Justice Game, 1998 Chatto; Viking edition 1999
- Crimes Against Humanity – The Struggle for Global Justice, Alan Lane, 1999; revised 2002 (Penguin paperback) and 2006 ISBN 0141024631
- The Tyrannicide Brief, Chatto & Windus, 2005
- Media Law (with Andrew Nicol QC), Sweet & Maxwell, 5th edition, 2008
- Statute of Liberty, Vintage Books Australia, March 2009, ISBN 978-1-74166-682-3
- Was there an Armenian Genocide? (online), October 2009, ISBN 978-0-9564086-0-0
- The Case of the Pope: Vatican Accountability for Human Rights Abuse, Penguin, October 2010, ISBN 978-0-241-95384-6
- The Massacre of Political Prisoners in Iran, 1988, with Sarah Graham, Abdorrahman Boroumand Foundation, 2011, ISBN 978-0984405404; and Addendum 2013, ISBN 9780984405435; see 1988 executions of Iranian political prisoners.
- Mullahs Without Mercy: How to Stop Iran's First Nuclear Strike, Vintage, October 2012, ISBN 9781742758213
- Dreaming too loud : Reflections on a race apart, Vintage, 2013, ISBN 9780857981899
- Stephen Ward was Innocent, OK, Biteback Publishing, 2013, ISBN 9781849546904
- An Inconvenient Genocide: Who Now Remembers the Armenians?, 2014, ISBN 978-1849547789
- Rather His Own Man: Reliable Memoirs, 2018
- Who Owns History? Elgin's Loot and the Case for Returning Plundered Treasure, Biteback Publishing, 2019, ISBN 9781785905216
- The Trial of Vladimir Putin, Biteback Publishing, 2024 ISBN 9781785908675
- World of War Crimes: Eyeless in Gaza… and Beyond, Biteback Publishing, 2025, ISBN 978-1785909770
