= Bent Coppers =

2003 non-fiction book by Graeme McLagan

- Cover of the first edition
- Author: Graeme McLagan
- Language: English
- Subject: Corruption within the Metropolitan Police
- Genre: Non-fiction
- Publisher: Orion Publishing Group
- Publication date: 2003
- Publication place: United Kingdom
- Media type: Print (hardcover and paperback)
- Pages: 265 (first edition); 480 (revised 2007 edition)
- ISBN: 9780297830931
- OCLC: 936505407

Bent Coppers: The Inside Story of Scotland Yard's Battle Against Police Corruption is a non-fiction book by award-winning British journalist Graeme McLagan. First published in the United Kingdom in 2003 by Orion Publishing Group, the book examines police corruption within the Metropolitan Police Service and South Eastern Regional Crime Squad—with particular focus on the 1990s and early 2000s—and the establishment and activities of the force's anti-corruption "Ghost Squad". Its publication led to a 4-year legal case resulting in a landmark ruling in English defamation law.

== Libel case ==
Following publication, McLagan and Orion were sued for libel by Michael Charman, a former detective constable with the Flying Squad who had been "required to resign" from the Metropolitan Police for "discreditable conduct". Charman alleged that the book libelled him by "suggesting that there were 'cogent grounds' of suspecting him of being involved in corruption." In seeking to have Charman's claim for damages dismissed, the author and publisher cited the "Reynolds defence" of qualified privilege, which protected publication of an allegation if it was made in the public interest and satisfied the test of responsible journalism.

In June 2006, at the High Court of Justice of England and Wales, Mr Justice Grey ruled that the book "did not pass all the necessary tests of "responsible journalism" and was not entitled to protection" of qualified privilege. Following the reaffirmation of the Reynolds defence in Jameel v Wall Street Journal Europe Sprl in October 2006, in which the Law Lords sitting in the House of Lords determined that libel judges in the lower courts had been interpreting the criteria too strictly, McLagan and Orion appealed their case. On 11 October 2007, Lord Justice Ward, Lord Justice Sedley and Lord Justice Hooper, sitting in the Court of Appeal of England and Wales, allowed the appeal and dismissed Charman's claim for damages—the first time that the Reynolds defence had succeeded in the publication of a book.

In their ruling, the judges said they were satisfied that the book was a piece of responsible journalism, that McLagan had taken steps to verify the story and that "as a result of his honesty, his expertise on the subject, his careful research and his painstaking evaluation of a mass of material, the book was protected." Caroline Kean, McLagan's solicitor, called the ruling "ground-breaking and momentous", and said: "This is an unambiguous confirmation by the Court of Appeal that Reynolds is alive and kicking. It is not limited to newspapers, it means all media and there is no time constraint. It applies equally to a book and, by analogy, it will apply to a film or a TV programme, providing it is something of proper public interest and a journalist has done his very best to act in the course of responsible journalism."

The Reynolds defence was replaced under the Defamation Act 2013 with the statutory defence of publication on a matter of public interest.
