= Adams Packer Film Productions =

Adams Packer Film Productions Pty Ltd. was a short lived film production company. It was owned by Phillip Adams and Kerry Packer.

Their first film was We of the Never Never.

The company joined the film group Bancour.

Packer withdrew from film production afterwards. Filmink later wrote this was "a shame because I feel he had the courage, cash and gambler’s instinct to make a good film mogul."

== Filmography ==
- A Personal History of the Australian Surf (1981)
- Lonely Hearts (1982)
- We of the Never Never (1983)
- Fighting Back (1982)
- Kitty and the Bagman (1983)
- Abra Cadabra (1983)
