= Late Night Live =

Australian radio program

- Other names: LNL
- Genre: Interview based talk radio
- Running time: 1 hour (10:05 pm – 10:59 pm) Monday to Thursday; Repeated 3:00 pm – 4:00 pm Tuesday to Friday
- Country of origin: Australia
- Language: English
- Home station: Radio National (ABC)
- Hosted by: David Marr (from 2024); Phillip Adams (1991–2024); Virginia Bell (1990–1991); Richard Ackland (1988–1990)
- Opening theme: "Chatterbox" (Kats-Chernin)
- Website: ABC Radio webpage
- Podcast: Podcast feed

Late Night Live (LNL) is an Australian Broadcasting Corporation radio program, broadcast on Radio National and also available as a podcast. It covers a wide variety of topics through interviews with the host, including current affairs, politics, science, philosophy and culture.

On 15 July 2024, David Marr became the program's new host. Over 33 years from 1991 to July 2024, the program was hosted by writer and public intellectual Phillip Adams. Previous hosts include publisher and journalist Richard Ackland, and Virginia Bell, who later became a justice of the High Court of Australia. Other guest hosts include: Tracey Holmes, Jonathan Green, Elizabeth Jackson, and Andrew West.

Often the setting for a serious and learned discussion of politics, science, philosophy and culture, the program aims to host cutting-edge discussion of public debate, and present ideas and issues not yet covered by other Australian media.

The programme is broadcast from 10:05 pm until 11 pm Mondays to Thursdays and, since the start of 2025, is repeat-broadcast from Tuesdays to Fridays at 4:05 pm. During January of each year, selected segments from the previous 10 or 11 months are re-broadcast, in lieu of fresh programming.

In 2011 a special online retrospective was compiled to celebrate 20 years behind the LNL microphone, called "In Bed With Phillip". Over 200 of selected interviews from these years are now available to listen and download.

To coincide with Adams' 20th anniversary at LNL he wrote Bedtime Stories: Tales from My 21 Years at RN's Late Night Live, published by HarperCollins, outlining why he decided to join RN, his early experiences with producers and talent, and what the time has meant to him personally.

== Regular contributors ==
Regular contributors include Laura Tingle, chief political correspondent for the ABC's current affairs TV show 7.30, who each Monday night discusses the most recent national political issues. Each Tuesday, American journalist Bruce Shapiro, director of the Dart Center for Journalism and Trauma, is on board to discuss contemporary USA politics, though the discussion can often be wide-ranging and include global politics. Every second Wednesday, a guest spot is held by Ian Dunt, editor-at-large of politics.co.uk, to discuss the latest political, cultural and economic news from Britain, Ireland and Europe. Less frequent regular contributors include the economist Satyajit Das and Tess Newton Cain, from Griffith University, who reports monthly on the Asia-Pacific region.

In earlier years, prominent regular contributors have included Margo Kingston and Beatrix Campbell, discussing the political culture of Australia and Britain respectively, while one of Kingston's successors was the conservative Liberal Party staffer and commentator Christian Kerr, who gained notoriety when revealed as the author of the pseudonymous Hillary Bray political gossip column published by Crikey (which he helped establish).

== Guests ==
Guests include high-profile thinkers, writers, journalists and players from the literary, cultural and political world. Over the past 30 years guests have included Henry Kissinger, Madeleine Albright, Gerry Adams, Arundhati Roy, David Frum, Isabel Allende, Kevin Rudd, Oliver Stone, and former Soviet president Mikhail Gorbachev, as well as Christopher Hitchens, Gore Vidal, Arthur Miller, Arthur C. Clarke, Jessica Mitford, Malcolm Fraser and Gough Whitlam.

== Format ==
Most programs are divided into three segments, each segment delineated by a sting, a short piece of instrumental music lasting about 30 seconds, though occasional one-hour conversations involving one or more guests became more frequent.

=== Under Phillip Adams ===
Adams maintained a running joke of self-deprecation or mock modesty; frequently referring to the program, despite its intellectual tone and international reputation, as "the little wireless program". For many years he referred to his audience as though only one person, named Gladys, was listening. With the advent of podcasting and web streaming, he began referring to his listeners as "Gladdies" and "Poddies", later "Tweethearts" to include those who followed him on Twitter.

Adams' style was conversational and casual, not adversarial: when interviewing political figures he might refer to himself jocularly as "an old leftie" then maintain a neutral viewpoint. He typically introduced his guests using their first and last names, followed by their qualifications and notable positions and achievements, and subsequently addressed them by their first name. When the guest was a university professor occupying a named chair, Adams would first ask them to briefly explain who or what the chair was named after. The pace was relaxed, Adams generally exerting subtle but firm control over the conversation's direction.

For most of the Adams era, the show's opening theme was a baroque instrumental, and for several years Elena Kats-Chernin's "Russian Rag", humorously dubbed by Adams "Waltz of the Wombat", though it was neither a waltz nor a tribute to the genus Vombatidae.

=== From 2024 ===
After taking over, David Marr mostly maintained Adams' style of presenting the program.

== Production ==
The program has a staff of four: the host, an executive producer, and three producers (who each do one night shift per week). A technical producer also puts the program to air each night. Though the host might make suggestions, the producers decide on the topic and guests, and they suggest questions, which the host may take or leave.

== Audience ==
In 2020 LNL monthly downloads had grown to over 1 million and shows no sign of lessening. It is the second most popular of all ABC radio programs, following Richard Fidler's Conversations.

In 2010 the estimated cumulative audience (number who listened during the past week) was 350,000, and the show was downloaded 217,463 times in August. Seventy five percent of downloads are to Australia, 6% to the US and 3% to Britain. Sixty five percent of listeners are university graduates; 90% are forty or older; 40% hold "AB" (e.g., white collar) jobs while 45% are not in the workforce (retired or home duties – not unemployed), and 55% are women.

== Theme music ==
The theme music adopted soon after Philip Adams took over as host, was the third movement of Johann Sebastian Bach's Concerto for two harpsichords in C minor (BWV 1060).

Later, it was replaced by "Russian Rag" by Elena Kats-Chernin, which Adams jokingly referred to as the 'Waltz of the Wombats'. Several different arrangements had been used: clarinet, trumpet, marimba, harp, violin, viola, cello, double bass; flute, oboe, clarinet, bassoon, horn, 2 violins, viola, cello, double bass; flute, piano, cello; bassoon with piano; clarinet with piano; violin with piano and unaccompanied piano.

Until March 2016, the theme music was "Eliza Aria" from the Wild Swans ballet also by Elena Kats-Chernin.

Then, until July 2025, the theme music was from the first movement of Giuseppe Brescianello's Violin Concerto No. 4 in E minor, Op. 1, performed by the Australian Brandenburg Orchestra.

At the end of David Marr's first year as host of the program, the baroque theme in August 2025 was replaced with Kats-Chernin's "Chatterbox Rag".
