= Graeme McLagan =

British journalist (born 1943)

Graeme McLagan (born 1943) is a British journalist who was Home Affairs correspondent for BBC News, specialising in crime and the police about which he has written three books.

== Early life and education ==
McLagan was educated at the Royal Grammar School, Newcastle upon Tyne. Instead of university, he went back-packing and hitch-hiking in 1962 across the Middle East, south and south-east Asia on what later became known as the 'Hippie Trail'.

== Journalism career ==
He was a reporter on the Newcastle Journal and the Daily Mail in London before joining the BBC, becoming Home Affairs correspondent. He won a Royal Television Society award in 1996 for his coverage of the Arms-to-Iraq affair. He travelled to Chile, the United States, South Africa and Jordan, reporting that these countries were used by British interests as secret diversionary routes to get arms to Iraq. He was commended in 1998 for Bent, a Panorama programme on police corruption. He wrote about journalists being caught on tape while seeking information from a private detective in the 'Big Brother' series of The Guardian magazine of 21 September 2002.

McLagan covered many major trials and the successful appeals of the Birmingham Six and the Maguire Seven. In 1997, he reported for the BBC Nine O'Clock News on the trial at the Old Bailey of eight defendants accused of an IRA plot to blow up electricity sub-stations around London. Six of the accused were found guilty and sentenced to thirty-five years in prison.

His reports of the committal proceedings against Jeremy Thorpe, the then Liberal Party leader, led to complaints about him sticking rigidly to the style at the time of calling defendants by their surname alone. The BBC then changed its Radio Four policy, giving Thorpe and those following him into the dock of the Old Bailey the title of 'Mr'.

In June 2021, his insight into events surrounding the axe-in-the-head murder of Daniel Morgan was recognised by the Daniel Morgan Independent Panel reviewing the role of police corruption over the killing. In a section on the media, the panel queried why McLagan's articles linking murder suspects with the News of the World had not been seen by the former Metropolitan Police Commissioner, Lord Stevens, before he started writing a column for that newspaper. McLagan also wrote about the Leveson inquiry into the phone hacking scandal, commenting on the revolving door between the Met and the News of the World.

== Book author ==
In 2003, his book Bent Coppers examined how Scotland Yard set up an anti-corruption "Ghost Squad" to combat corruption in the Metropolitan Police and the South East Regional Crime Squad. "If you want a book that is genuinely 'unputdownable' read Bent Coppers." (Johnny Vaughan, Sun). "Few journalists are better qualified to write on the subject of corruption inside the Metropolitan Poile than Graeme McLagan... A very engaging read - the outrageous nature of the bent cops' behaviour guarantees that." (Sunday Telegraph). He and his publisher Orion Books were sued for libel by a former policeman, but won the case in October 2007 in the Court of Appeal. The case made legal history as it was the first time the so-called Reynolds defence had been used for a book. Named after the former Irish Taoiseach Albert Reynolds, who sued Times Newspapers, that case established qualified privilege for publishing defamatory statements, provided they were in the public interest. It meant a court would investigate not only the content of the publication, but also the journalist's conduct. The court said of McLagan that "as a result of his honesty, his expertise on the subject, his careful research and his painstaking evaluation of a mass of material, the book was protected." The Reynolds defence was replaced under the Defamation Act 2013 with the statutory defence of publication on a matter of public interest.

In 2005, McLagan published Guns and Gangs about gun crime throughout the UK. "Graeme McLagan provides, perhaps for the first time, real answers... He has looked into the heart of the phenomenon and what he saw there makes compelling, if disturbing, reading." (Evening Standard)

In February 2021, Buddy Club Productions, co-founded by BAFTA-nominee Keeley Hawes, acquired screen rights for a TV series for his book Mr Evil (also titled Killer on the Streets) about David Copeland, who was convicted of murder for the 1999 London nail bombings. The book was co-authored by Nick Lowles, a former editor of Searchlight magazine and founder of Hope not Hate, which campaigns against racism. Copeland targeted black, Asian and LGBT communities (the latter at the Admiral Duncan pub). In the bombings, three people died and 140 were injured. The drama series is being written by twice-nominated BAFTA writer Brian Fillis. McLagan also contributed background material for a Netflix documentary Nail Bomber: Manhunt on Copeland.

In April 2021, he was interviewed for Bent Coppers: Crossing the Line of Duty, a three-part series on BBC2 about police corruption in the 1970s. The programme explained how corrupt police officers in both the Metropolitan and City of London police forces took bribes from armed robbers to water down evidence and help them get bail.

== Books ==
- Mr Evil (2000) Hardback John Blake (ISBN 1-85782-416-4) Paperback Killer on the Streets (ISBN 1-904034-33-0)
- Bent Coppers (2003) Hardback Weidenfeld & Nicolson (ISBN 9780297830931) Paperback Orion (ISBN 0-7528-5902-1)
- Guns and Gangs (2005) Allison and Busby (ISBN 0-7490-8348-4) Paperback (ISBN 0-7490-8218-6)
