= Sri Lanka's Secrets: How the Rajapaksa Regime Gets Away with Murder =

- Author: Trevor Grant
- Language: English
- Genre: Non-fiction
- Publisher: Monash University Publishing, Australia
- Publication date: 2014
- Pages: 220
- ISBN: 9781922235534

Sri Lanka's Secrets: How the Rajapaksa Regime Gets Away with Murder is a 2014 book written by Australian writer, veteran journalist and activist Trevor Grant, examining the various forms of genocide perpetuated on Tamil people by the Sri Lankan government and the complicity of international establishments.

Grant who had worked closely with torture victims and other persecuted asylum seekers, presents the extent of Sinhalese chauvinism in power in Colombo, and the evil complicity of establishments in New Delhi, Washington and Westminster that allowed and assisted a brutal regime to slaughter tens of thousands of innocent people and then carry on with its genocidal plan.

The book features about 90 pages of photographic evidence and many eyewitness accounts. The book is published by Monash University Publishing with a foreword by eminent human rights lawyer Geoffrey Robertson.

== Synopsis ==
Sri Lanka’s Secrets, which is illustrated with graphic photos of the war and its aftermath, has poignant eyewitness accounts of survivors who experienced the war.
