= Abra Cadabra (film) =

- Finnish VHS cover
- Directed by: Alexander Stitt
- Written by: Alexander Stitt
- Produced by: Phillip Adams; Alexander Stitt
- Starring: John Farnham; Jacki Weaver
- Cinematography: Volk Mol
- Music by: Peter Best
- Production company: Adams Packer Film Productions
- Release date: 1983
- Running time: 84 minutes
- Country: Australia
- Language: English

Abra Cadabra is a 1983 Australian animated fantasy musical comedy film written, co-produced and directed by Alexander Stitt, The film is inspired on the tale of the Pied Piper of Hamelin. Starring John Farnham and Jacki Weaver, it is the first ever animated feature film to be filmed in stereoscopic 3-D.

The film was theatrically released in stereoscopic 3D as well as in a regular version.

== Cast ==
- John Farnham as Abra Cadabra
- Jacki Weaver as Primrose Buttercup
- Hayes Gordon as B.L.Z'Bubb
- Gary Files as Klaw
- James Smillie as Mr Pig

== See also ==
- Grendel Grendel Grendel, the first animated feature directed by Alexander Stitt
- List of animated feature films of 1983
- List of 3D films
