= Barry Crocker =

Australian singer, entertainer, and actor (born 1935)

Barry Crocker AM
- Born: 4 November 1935 (age 90); Geelong, Victoria, Australia
- Occupations: Singer; television personality; actor (theatre, television and film); variety entertainer; comedian
- Years active: 1955−present
- Known for: The Adventures of Barry McKenzie; Barry McKenzie Holds His Own
- Notable work: Host of The Sound of Music; Singer of original version, and first updated version, of the theme song to soap opera Neighbours
- Partner: Katy Manning (1988–present)
- Children: 5
- Website: https://barrycrockerofficial.com/

Barry Hugh Crocker (born 4 November 1935) is an Australian Gold Logie-winning character actor, television personality, singer, and variety entertainer with a crooning vocal style.

Crocker played the title role in the Australian film The Adventures of Barry McKenzie (1972) and its sequel, Barry McKenzie Holds His Own (1974). Crocker was also the presenter and leading performer on the TV series The Sound of Music, taking over from entertainer Bobby Limb.

His singing talents eventually earned him over 30 Gold records. In 1971, Sound of Music was the 11th-most-popular show in the country. Crocker sang the theme tune to the Australian soap opera Neighbours between 1985 and 1992. Crocker published an autobiography called Bazza – The Adventures of Barry Crocker in 2003. In 2023, he published Last of the Entertainers: A Star-Studded Story Across Sixty-Five Years of Television, Stage, Screen and in Recording.

== Early life ==
Crocker was born in Geelong, Victoria. After doing National Service with the RAAF in 1955, he toured with a theatre group and performed on the club circuit in Melbourne, followed by a partnership with David Clark (aka Dave Nelson), and performed in the UK and the United States.

== Career ==
Crocker returned to Australia to star in a TV musical comedy show on Channel 10 Sydney (now Network Ten) called 66 And All That in 1966, hence the title, which became The Barry Crocker Show (1966–67) That was followed by the musical variety show Say It with Music (1967–1969), also broadcast on Channel 10.

=== Acting ===
Crocker made his acting debut on a 1969 episode of Skippy the Bush Kangaroo. He has also had a successful career as a stage, television and motion picture actor, most notably starring alongside Barry Humphries in the title role of Bruce Beresford's 1972 movie, The Adventures of Barry McKenzie and its 1974 sequel, Barry McKenzie Holds His Own. The "bogan" character of Barry McKenzie gave rise to Crocker recording such ribald songs as "My One Eyed Trouser Snake" and other "off-colour" songs.

Crocker was Beresford's first choice as lead actor when it came to the filming of David Williamson's popular play Don's Party, but serious back problems curtailed Crocker's screen career at that point, opening the way for John Hargreaves to achieve film success in the coveted title role.

Nevertheless, in 1976 Crocker was crowned King of Moomba, the annual entertainment festival in Melbourne.

He had the lead role as Governor Alan Smith in the short-lived prison drama Punishment (1981), and guest-starred in two episodes of the Australian satirical black comedy series Review with Myles Barlow. Later TV roles included parts in Pizza, Swift and Shift Couriers, and Housos for SBS, and The Strange Calls, an ABC2 comedy series.

In 1994, Crocker appeared as himself in the worldwide record-breaking film Muriel's Wedding. He proved his acting and comedy credentials once again as the retro-disco host Donny Destry in the 2007 movie Razzle Dazzle.

Crocker appeared as Charles "Hoot" Russell, Greg Russell's father in the Hey Dad..! episode "Hoot's Boots". It was the second-last episode of the show, which had spanned 14 seasons. A DVD box set of Hey Dad..! has had to be abandoned, following the conviction of the original "Dad", Robert Hughes, on several sex offences.

In 2005, Crocker was featured on the Nine Network program This Is Your Life. It was a rare accolade, because Crocker had already been the subject of this prestigious TV program thirty years earlier, in 1975, when the show was hosted by Roger Climpson. Crocker was caught by surprise when host Mike Munro and the TV production team arrived, after a lot of careful planning by his long-term partner, Katy Manning, the English actress.

Crocker was chosen by Chaim Topol to co-star as his nemesis Lazer Wolfe in a long-running Australian season of the musical Fiddler on the Roof. He also featured in the role of The Lecturer in the 2008 Australian premiere of the stage musical Reefer Madness.

Crocker presented the Australian version of Behind Mansion Walls on the Crime and Investigation Network on Foxtel in Australia.

=== Music career ===
In 1959, after successfully touring and a number of television appearances, he convinced Cyril Stevens, of Spotlight Records in Thornbury, to audition him and his musical partner. Stevens, who was a photographer by trade, had set up a recording studio in the early 1950s. He recorded mainly jazz and musical events around Victoria. Stevens wasn't impressed, and Crocker and Dave Clark were about to leave when Stevens' son entered the room, recognised the pair from television and concerts, and convinced his father to record the team. Two EPs were recorded, totalling eight tracks. The records were Spotlight's highest sellers.

In May 1973, Crocker released the album Music Makes My Day, on Festival Records, featuring an updated version of American rockabilly singer Robin Luke's "Susie Darlin'". The recording featured Olivia Newton-John and Pat Carroll on backup vocals, and enjoyed chart success, peaking at number 7.

He sang the original recording of the theme song for the 1977 Reg Grundy soap opera, The Restless Years (later a hit for Renée Geyer), and also the original theme to the long-running soap opera Neighbours, another Reg Grundy production. His version was used from 1985 to 1992, and it was also played during the series' final episode, which aired in July 2022.

Crocker wrote and recorded an unofficial theme song for the Australian rules football team, Geelong, entitled Come on the Cats.

== Personal life ==
Crocker married Doreen (Dene), with whom he had five children: Geraldine, Martine, Erica, Barry jnr. and Amanda. He has to date eight grandchildren, 16 great grandchildren and 1 great, great, grandchild born May 2025. In the 1970s, he entered into a relationship with Christine Platel, which lasted five years, which resulted in the divorce from his wife. Since 1988, he has been in a relationship with English actress Katy Manning, whom he met in Australia, although she moved back to the UK in 2010 she still regularly comes to Australia and they maintain a long-distance relationship.

== Discography ==
=== Charting albums ===
List of albums which had a chart position within a national top 100
Title	Album details	Peak chart positions
Title	Album details	AUS
Barry Crocker Sings "The Hits" (with The Tony Hatch Orchestra)	Released: 1975; Label: Astor	73
Sings the Hits Volume 2	Released: 1975; Label: Astor	82
You're My World	Released: 1981; Label: J & B Records	81

=== Charting singles ===
List of singles which had a chart position within a national top 100
Title	Year	Chart peak positions		Album
Title	Year	AUS	UK	Album
"Please Don't Go"	1969	39	—	I've Gotta Be Me
"The Pensioner"	1970	93	—	
"Love Is a Beautiful Song"	1971	31	—	Barry Crocker in London
"Susie Darlin'"	1973	7	—	Golden Hits
"Love, Where Are You Now?"	1975	45	—	
"Neighbours"	1988	—	83	

== Awards ==
=== Mo Awards ===
The Australian Entertainment Mo Awards (commonly known informally as the Mo Awards), were annual Australian entertainment industry awards. They recognise achievements in live entertainment in Australia from 1975 to 2016. Barry Crocker won two awards in that time and was inducted into the Hall of Fame in 2013.

Year	Nominee / work	Award	Result (wins only)
1976	Barry Crocker	Entertainer of the Year	Won
1981	Barry Crocker	Entertainer of the Year	Won
2013	Barry Crocker	Hall of Fame	inductee

== In popular culture ==
During the 1980s, the rhyming slang expression "Barry Crocker", or simply "Barry" or "Baz", emerged in Australian English to mean a "shocker", as in "very poor". In 1997, the term "Having a Barry" was included in the third edition of the Macquarie Dictionary as rhyming slang.

A notable public use of the expression was on the front page of the Sydney newspaper The Daily Telegraph on 17 April 2014 when Barry O'Farrell the Premier of New South Wales, was forced to resign, allegedly for accepting a gift of an expensive bottle of wine without declaring it, and then later denying in court that he had even received the gift. The headline, consisting of almost half the front page, read "A Barry Crocker".

In February 2022, news of the cancellation of Neighbours in the British press prompted fans of the TV show to download the theme song. It reached No. 1 on UK iTunes and at No. 11 on the UK Singles Sales Chart sales and downloads chart ending 17 February 2022.

== Filmography ==
=== Film ===
Title	Year	Role
Squeeze a Flower	1970	Waiter
The Adventures of Barry McKenzie	1972	Barry McKenzie
Barry McKenzie Holds His Own	1974	Barry McKenzie – Rev Kevin McKenzie
Shotgun Wedding	1993	Voice
Muriel's Wedding	1994	Himself
Twitch (short)	2000	Quiz Show Host
Razzle Dazzle: A Journey into Dance	2007	Donnie Dusty
The Strange Calls (short)	2011	Gregor
The Advisor (short)	2012	Gerhard
Houses vs. Authority	2012	Federal Judge

=== Television ===
Title	Year	Role
66 and All That	1966	Presenter
The Barry Crocker Show	1966–67	Presenter
Say It with Music	1966–67	Presenter
Skippy the Bush Kangaroo	1969	Alfred Aloysius Mortimer
This Is Your Life	1975	Guest
The Sound of Music		Presenter & Leading Performer
Punishment	1981	Governor Alan Smith
Heartbreak High	1994	Compere
Hey Dad..! (episode: "Hoots Boots")	1994	Charles 'Hoot' Russell
Twisted	1997	Sir Barry Doyle
Variety Show at the End of the World	2000	Death
Pizza	2000	Clarence Bumpkin
This Is Your Life	2005	Guest
Magical Tales	2010	Whirly Wizard
Legend of Enyo	2010	Shamani (voice)
Rake	2010	Errol Greene
Behind Mansion Walls	2011	Joe Pikul
Swift and Shift Couriers	2011	Reg Jones CEO
Housos	2011	Premier
The Strange Calls (miniseries)	2012	Gregor
