= Kimo Wilder McVay =

American musician and talent manager (1927–2001)

- Birth name: James Wilder McVay
- Also known as: Kimo McVay; The Baron of Waikiki; Knuckles McVay
- Born: September 16, 1927; Washington, DC
- Died: June 29, 2001 (aged 73); Honolulu, Hawaii
- Occupation: Show business entrepreneur
- Years active: 1950–2001

James “Kimo” Wilder McVay (September 16, 1927 – June 29, 2001) was an American musician turned talent manager, who successfully promoted Hawaiian entertainment acts. McVay promoted and managed acts such as teenage heartthrob Robin Luke, Don Ho, New Zealand singer John Rowles, comic Andy Bumatai, Keolo and Kapono Beamer, ventriloquist Freddie Morris, magician John Hirokawa and many others.

== Biography ==
McVay was born September 16, 1927, in Washington, D.C.. His father was Navy Captain Charles Butler McVay III. His mother was American heiress Kinau Wilder III (1902–1992), great-granddaughter of settler missionary physician and politician Gerrit Parmele Judd, and granddaughter of shipping magnate Samuel Gardner Wilder. One of his many cousins on his mother's side was George R. Carter (1866–1933), the Territorial Governor of Hawaii.

It was possibly the clearing of his father's name that gave McVay the most personal satisfaction. His father was found guilty of negligence in the 1945 sinking of the USS Indianapolis in the closing days of World War II and eventually committed suicide as a result. Kimo spent his adult life on a quest to clear the record. Half a century later, the United States Congress passed action exonerating the senior McVay.

=== Robin Luke ===
High school student Robin Luke was appearing in a 1958 Punahou School music program when McVay saw the potential of this fresh-faced teenager. McVay hooked Luke up with Bob Bertram of the Hawaii-based Bertram International Studio where they recorded Susie Darlin' about Luke's kid sister. McVay went on to promote the song with local deejays and TV stations, helping to make the song a national hit.

=== Duke Kahanamoku and Don Ho ===
McVay was a friend and manager to Duke Kahanamoku. The Duke Kahanamoku Invitational Surfing Championship was developed by Kimo McVay in 1965, in part to help publicize the newly opened Duke Kahanamoku's nightclub McVay operated in the International Market Place in Waikiki. In the early 1960s, Kimo accompanied Duke Kahanamoku to see the up-and-coming Don Ho at Honey's in Kaneohe. It was a magic moment that brought Don to Duke's Waikiki nightclub as a springboard to international fame for Ho and his band The Aliis. With Don on stage hoisting a mai tai glass and encouraging the crowd to "Suck 'em up, everybody!", the promotional "Suck 'em Up"-themed mai tai glasses became souvenirs among Don Ho fandom. It was McVay who in 1967 talked Don Ho into recording the song Tiny Bubbles, written by Leon Pober, Ho's signature tune.

=== John Rowles ===
McVay lined up Maori artist John Rowles as Duke's in-residence act to follow Ho's tenure at the nightclub. Rowles had already made his United States debut the same year at the Flamingo Las Vegas, following Ho's booking at that venue. When Rowles was the in-residence act at Duke's, McVay placed copies of Rowles' hit single Cheryl Moana Marie into invitations for the opening of Al Lopaka as a fill in act for Rowles. Under McVay's management, Rowles would become the headliner at the Royal Hawaiian Hotel's Monarch Room.

=== Na Hoku Hanohano Award ===
The Hawai'i Academy of Recording Arts awarded McVay the 1999 Na Hoku Hanohano Lifetime Achievement Award for his substantial contributions to the entertainment industry in Hawaii.

== Personal life and death ==
McVay and his wife Betsy were the parents of a son, Mark, and two daughters, Lindsey and Melissa. Mark died in 1965 at the age of eight from brain cancer.

McVay died of pancreatic cancer on June 29, 2001. At the time, he was managing magician John Hirokawa.
