= The Case of the Pope =

2010 book by Geoffrey Robertson

The Case of the Pope: Vatican Accountability for Human Rights Abuse
- First edition
- Author: Geoffrey Robertson
- Genre: Political/legal nonfiction
- Publisher: Penguin Books
- Publication date: 14 September 2010
- Publication place: Australia
- Pages: 228
- ISBN: 978-0241953846

The Case of the Pope – Vatican Accountability for Human Rights Abuse is a book written by Geoffrey Robertson in 2010 which examines the Roman Catholic Church's responses to allegations of sexual abuse in the Catholic church. The book analyzes the legal, moral, and ethical implications of the issue.

Robertson argues that the Vatican should be held to the same standards of accountability and justice as any other state or institution.

== Reception ==
A review in The Economist described The Case of the Pope as a book which offers readers "a better understanding of the serious problems that can arise when two legal systems, one secular and the other religious, operate in parallel".

The New Statesman said, "Geoffrey Robertson's scalding j'accuse against priestly paedophile perpetrators, the Vatican and the current Pope [Pope Benedict XVI] will likely infuriate most devout Catholics..."

The Monthly called The Case of the Pope a "fiery" argument that "the Vatican should be treated as a kind of 'rogue state' until it stops using statehood and the ancient rules of canon law to protect paedophile priests".
