= Patrice Newell =

Australian author and farmer (born 1956)

Patrice Newell AM
- Born: Patrice Lesley Newell; 2 September 1956 (age 69); Adelaide, South Australia, Australia
- Education: University of Newcastle
- Occupations: Biodynamic farmer, author
- Known for: former model; TV presenter; author; biodynamic farmer
- Spouse: Phillip Adams
- Children: 1

Patrice Lesley Newell AM (born 2 September 1956) is an Australian former model, television presenter turned author, and biodynamic farmer.

== Career ==
In 1980s Newell was in a high-profile career with the Special Broadcasting Service (SBS) and the Nine Network where she co-hosted Today. In 1986 she went to live on the land and run a 4,000 hectare (40 km²) property, known as Elmswood, in the Hunter Valley, New South Wales. She is an advocate for sustainable agriculture which she talks about in her books The Olive Grove, The River, Ten Thousand Acres – A Love Story, Tree to Table: Cooking with Australian Olive Oil and Who’s Minding the Farm? In this Climate Emergency, released via Penguin Random House in June 2019.

She is a founding member and president of the Hunter Olive Association.

Newell was the subject of A Place in the Country, the 4 October 2001 edition of the ABC-Television biography program, Australian Story.

In December 2006, she announced that she would be running for a seat on the New South Wales Legislative Council in the 2007 New South Wales state election as an independent candidate, endorsed by the Climate Change Coalition. Her policy platform was to put pressure on the Government to acknowledge that climate change is "the greatest crisis in human history" and that it should be recognised and taken into account in all Government policy. Although she did not win a seat, Newell was the lead candidate on the New South Wales Senate group ticket for the Climate Change Coalition in the 2007 Australian federal election.

In 2015 Newell earned a doctorate at the University of Newcastle in Environmental Science: A strategic assessment of the potential for a new pyrolysis industry in the Hunter Valley.

Newell is a regular speaker and advocate for climate change within the agriculture sector.

As of 2021, she is an Adjunct Associate Lecturer at University of Newcastle.

In the 2021 Queen's Birthday Honours Newell has appointed a Member of the Order of Australia for "significant service to the environment, and to sustainable farming practices".

== Personal life ==
Newell is married to Phillip Adams and they have one daughter.

== Bibliography ==
- A Place in the Country
- The Olive Grove, (2000; written in the form of diary entries)
- A Place on Earth
- The River
- Ten Thousand Acres – A Love Story
- Who's Minding the Farm? In This Climate Emergency

With her partner Phillip Adams, she is the compiler of several books of jokes:

- The Great Australian joke book
- The Official Aussie Joke Book
