= Life. Be in it. =

Australian government fitness campaign

Life. Be In it.

Life. Be in it. is a health promotion and advertising charity, primarily known for its campaign encouraging people to be more active, started in 1975 by the Victorian state government. Following the loss of government funding in 1981, it became an independent charity and has intermittently run adverts on Australian and occasionally American television, featuring the animated character Norm. The National Museum of Australia included Life. Be in it in their Defining Moments in Australian History project.

== Television campaign ==
The television advertisements for the program are cartoons featuring people doing a wide range of activities, with a catchy tune "Be in it today, live more of your life". The main character is Norm, a middle aged man with a prominent beer belly, meant to represent a "normal" Australian bloke. The idea for Norm and the advertising came from Phillip Adams and Alex Stitt; Stitt drew all the cartoons. In the original run of television advertisements, Norm was voiced by Max Gillies. In the 2000 revival, the voice was provided by Dr Colin Benjamin. The original theme music for the campaign was created by Peter Best.

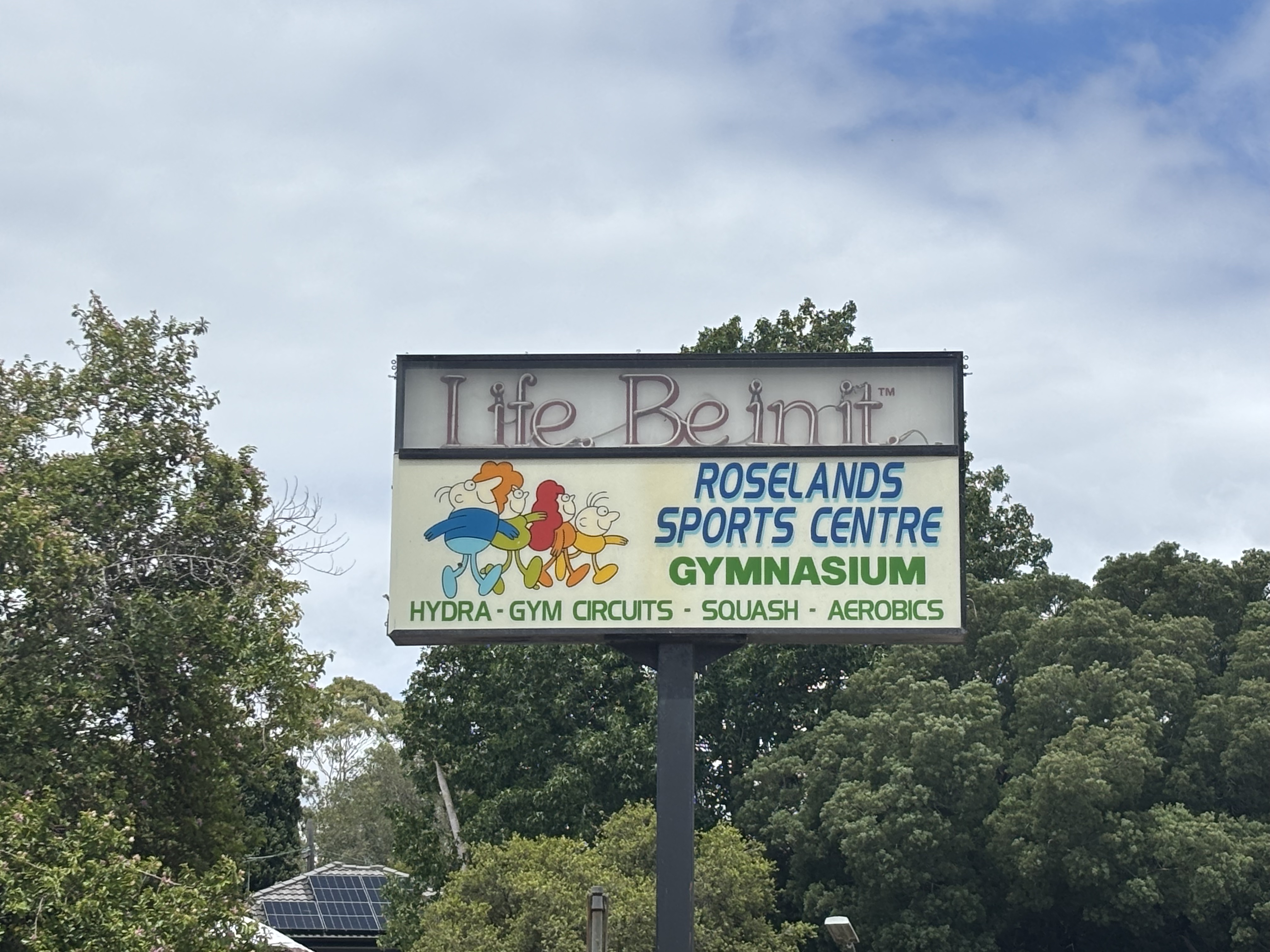
Life. Be in it. logo and artwork seen on Roselands Sports Centre sign in Sydney, NSW in 2025.

The program began in 1975, with the Victorian state government, developed by the Monahan Dayman Adams advertising company, underneath Liberal Party member Brian Dixon, former Australian rules footballer and then Minister for Youth, Sport and Recreation. The original concept of 'Life, be in it' was created by Dr John Cooper and Oscar Scherl and was presented to the agency in the early 1970s.

Following success in Victoria, Dixon claimed 35% of Victorians had become more active as a result of the campaign, the federal government funded and relaunched the program nationally in 1978. This new relaunch subtly redesigned to make the main character Norm more pathetic, due to concerns too many people had identified with him positively. The campaign also aired in the United States on local television stations during the 1970s and 1980s.

One of their early programs was to bring over Pat Farrington, a co-founder of the New Games, supplying her with five vans and 25 volunteers to drive around rural townships in Victoria, teaching people how to play games (New Games Book: p22).

The campaign was relaunched in 2000, after several years of inactivity, for the 25th anniversary of the original campaign. It again went into hibernation afterwards. During the 2018 state election, the Coalition, promised to relaunch the campaign. The Coalition lost the election to the incumbent Labor Party. Subsequently, the original artist Alex Stitt's widow, Paddy Stitt, called the plan anachronistic and inappropriate. The campaign was finally relaunched in 2023, under a Labor government, with the partnership of Roy Morgan. The original adverts were redesigned for high definition television, and the campaign was written to focus on being active again after the COVID-19 pandemic.

== State based associations ==
State-based associations run campaigns and health education on behalf of the national charity, including Life. Be in it. South Australia, which runs health programs at Unley High School and Life. Be in it FunWorks in Queensland and New South Wales, which hold fitness events for youth. Previously, Life. Be in it. Victoria also ran health programs.
