= Say It with Music (1967 TV series) =

- Genre: Variety
- Presented by: Barry Crocker; Kathy Lloyd; Helen Zerefos; Neil Williams
- Country of origin: Australia
- Original language: English

Original release
- Network: 0-10 Network
- Release: 1967 – 1969

Say It with Music is a 1967–1969 Australian TV series which aired on the 0/10 Network (now Network Ten). It was a variety series with music, aimed at a middle-aged audience. The series was produced in Sydney. Hosted by Barry Crocker, regulars included Kathy Lloyd, Helen Zerefos and Neil Williams.
