= Barry McKenzie Holds His Own =

1974 Australian film by Bruce Beresford

- Theatrical release poster
- Directed by: Bruce Beresford
- Written by: Bruce Beresford; Barry Humphries
- Produced by: Bruce Beresford
- Starring: Barry Crocker; Barry Humphries; Donald Pleasence; Dick Bentley
- Cinematography: Don McAlpine
- Edited by: William Anderson
- Music by: Peter Best
- Production company: Reg Grundy Productions
- Distributed by: Roadshow (Australia)
- Release date: 12 December 1974
- Running time: 93 minutes
- Country: Australia
- Language: English
- Budget: A$450,000
- Box office: A$1,407,000 (Australia)

Barry McKenzie Holds His Own is a 1974 Australian comedy film directed by Bruce Beresford and starring Barry Crocker, Barry Humphries and Donald Pleasence. It was written by Beresford and Humphries.

It was a sequel to the 1972 Australian comedy film The Adventures of Barry McKenzie.

The then Prime Minister of Australia, Gough Whitlam, along with his wife Margaret Whitlam, made cameo appearances as themselves.

Barry Humphries contended that Barry McKenzie was an inspiration for the later film Crocodile Dundee.

== Plot ==
The film continues directly where The Adventures of Barry McKenzie ended with Barry McKenzie and his aunt Edna returning home to Australia from England.

During the flight two henchmen of Count Plasma (a Dracula-type Minister of Culture from the People's Republic of Transylvania) mistake Edna for the Queen of the United Kingdom and kidnap her during their brief stopover in Paris, believing that she will draw tourists to their country.

It is then up to Barry, his identical twin brother the Reverend Kevin McKenzie, his Parisian expatriate Aussie friend "Col the Frog" and his other expatriate mates in France and England to head a team of Australian agents to be parachuted into Transylvania and rescue Edna.

Barry and Edna return home to Australia and are greeted by Gough Whitlam and his wife. Whitlam makes Edna a dame.

== Cast ==
- Barry Crocker as Barry McKenzie / Kevin McKenzie
- Barry Humphries as Senator Douglas Manton / Edna Everage / Meyer de Lamphrey / buck-toothed Englishman
- Donald Pleasence as Count Plasma
- Dick Bentley as Col 'The Frog' Lucas
- Ed Devereaux as Sir Alec Ferguson
- Roy Kinnear as Bishop of Paris
- Don Spencer as quizmaster
- Frank Windsor as police sergeant
- Derek Guyler as police constable
- Arthur English as cockney spiv
- Desmond Tester as Marcel Escargot
- John Le Mesurier as Robert Crowther
- Tommy Trinder as Arthur McKenzie
- Chantal Contouri as Zizi
- Clive James as Paddy

== Production ==
Bruce Beresford wanted to make a film of the 1910 novel The Getting of Wisdom by Henry Handel Richardson but was unable to raise finance. Barry McKenzie Holds His Own was entirely funded by Reg Grundy. Shooting began in February 1974. Most of the film was shot on location in England, Wales and Paris, with some studio scenes shot in London. Edna's home movie footage was shot at Palm Beach, Sydney, in December 1973. British unions constantly objected to Australian cast and crew working in Britain.

== Reception ==
=== Box office ===
Barry McKenzie Holds His Own grossed $1,407,000 at the box office in Australia.

=== Critical ===
The Monthly Film Bulletin wrote: "Barry McKenzie is basically the Englishman, Irishman and Scotsman joke extended to include every possible racial and sexual stereotype, in every permutation of cultural collision and with all mythical characteristics reduced to their lowest common denominator. The strength of this version of the joke is the grotesque wealth of the argot which Humphries has invented for his colonial Candide, a slang so relentless in its vulgarity that it is impossible now to judge to what extent he invented or merely recreated it. ... The humour is diverted sufficiently from McKenzie's sexual quest to allow satire to emerge more strongly than in the first film. The introduction by the Minister of Culture (Humphries himself), and the Monty Pythonish Migration Game in which possible English emigrants are quizzed to see if they have suitably pro-Aussie, anti-Pommie attitudes, display a sharpness not found in The Adventures of Barry McKenzie and suggest that there is still room for development and improvement if the series proves to be a continuing one."

Filmink argued that "while the first film used a plot with at least some origins in true experience (i.e. an Aussie abroad in London), the second one used a plot based on the movies (i.e vampire films) and dealt with things that didn't really have resonance with Australia (e.g., Transylvania). If Bazza 2 focused on, say, Bazza backpacking through Europe, I think it would've been just as big a hit."
