= Dow Jones & Co Inc v Gutnick =

Judgment of the High Court of Australia

Dow Jones & Co Inc and Gutnick
- Court: High Court of Australia
- Full case name: Dow Jones & Company Inc and Gutnick
- Decided: 10 December 2002
- Citations: [2002] HCA 56; (2002) 210 CLR 575; (2002) 194 ALR 433; (2002) 77 ALJR 255
- Transcripts: 18 October 2001; 14 November 2001; 14 December 2001; 14 May 2002; 28 May 2002; 28 July 2003; 3 October 2003

Case history
- Appealed from: Supreme Court of Victoria

Court membership
- Judges sitting: Chief Justice Murray Gleeson; Justice Mary Gaudron; Justice Michael McHugh; Justice William Gummow; Justice Michael Kirby; Justice Kenneth Hayne; Justice Ian Callinan

Case opinions
- Gutnick could sue Dow Jones in a Victorian court for defamation as: a person may sue for defamation in the jurisdiction where an alleged defamatory communication caused reputational damage (usually the place where the communication was received). This existing principle should not be modified for internet communications.; as Gutnick was only claiming damages related to reputational harm in Victoria, that jurisdiction was an appropriate forum to hear the case.

Dow Jones & Co Inc v Gutnick was an Internet defamation case heard in the High Court of Australia, decided on 10 December 2002. The 28 October 2000 edition of Barron's Online, published by Dow Jones, contained an article entitled "Unholy Gains" in which several references were made to the respondent, Joseph Gutnick. Gutnick contended that part of the article defamed him. A key judgment was that the suit could be brought in Australia.

== Facts ==
The article in question was entitled Unholy Gains, by William Alpert, published in Barron's 2000 Oct 30. Australian courts described the details of the article in their written opinion on the case, as follows:

[The article] states that some of his business dealings with religious charities raise "uncomfortable questions". The author then uses some language that the media have appropriated from the law courts, implying that a balanced trial with equal opportunity to participate by all concerned has taken place: that a "Barron's investigation found that several charities traded heavily in stocks promoted by Gutnick". (emphasis added) The article associates the respondent with Mr Nachum Goldberg who is apparently a convicted tax evader and another person awaiting trial for stock manipulation in New York.

In court it was proved that only five copies of the Barron's print edition were sent from New Jersey to be circulated in Australia, but that none had actually arrived in the Jurisdiction. Gutnick therefore resorted to the internet based publication in order to show an actionable tort in the jurisdiction. The Internet version of the magazine had 550,000 international subscribers and 1,700 Australian-based credit cards.

Geoffrey Robertson QC argued for the publisher Dow Jones as to whether it was considered to be "published from" where it was uploaded in New Jersey or "published into" where it was downloaded by subscribers in Victoria, Australia. The argument was on publication and jurisdiction.

== Decision ==
In a unanimous decision, all seven High Court justices decided that Gutnick had the right to sue for defamation at his primary residence and the place he was best known. Victoria was considered the place where damage to his reputation occurred. The High Court decided that defamation did not occur at the time of publishing, but as soon as a third party read the publication and thought less of the individual who was defamed.

Dow Jones was forced to admit in court that "there was no reason to believe Mr Gutnick was a customer of Mr Goldberg or had any criminal or improper relations with Mr Goldberg" (quote from an Australian Broadcasting Corporation story).

The High Court's ruling effectively allows defamation plaintiffs in Australia to sue for defamation on the internet against any defendant irrespective of their location. "If people wish to do business in, or indeed travel to, or live in, or utilize the infrastructure of different countries, they can hardly expect to be absolved from compliance with the laws of those countries. The fact that publication might occur everywhere does not mean that it occurs nowhere" (per Callinan J at para 186).

Equally, however, the majority of the Court (Gleeson CJ, McHugh, Gummow and Hayne JJ handing down a joint decision) stated that they disagreed that this would cause open-slather defamation actions in Australia: (at para 54 of the decision)

[T]he spectre which Dow Jones sought to conjure up in the present appeal, of a publisher forced to consider every article it publishes on the World Wide Web against the defamation laws of every country from Afghanistan to Zimbabwe is seen to be unreal when it is recalled that in all except the most unusual of cases, identifying the person about whom material is to be published will readily identify the defamation law to which that person may resort.

The case was highly controversial and the subject of much commentary from legal analysts. The case was appealed by the author, to the UN under the right of direct petition for individuals. In the teeth of that application prepared by Geoffrey Robertson, Tim Robertson SC, Mark Stephens (solicitor) and Johnson Winter Slattery lawyer Paul Reidy, the case was settled on 15 November 2004, Dow Jones settled the case, agreeing to pay Gutnick some of his legal fees.
