= A Personal History of the Australian Surf =

A Personal History of the Australian Surf: Being the Confessions of a Straight Poofter
- Directed by: Michael Blakemore
- Written by: Michael Blakemore
- Produced by: Jeremy Cornford
- Starring: Michael Blakemore
- Music by: Peter Best
- Production company: Adams Packer Film Productions
- Release date: 1981
- Running time: 51:41
- Country: Australia
- Budget: £50,000

A Personal History of the Australian Surf: Being the Confessions of a Straight Poofter Is a 1981 autobiographical documentary by Michael Blakemore, who wrote, directed, and starred in it. The film was made on 16mm film and was first screened in the United Kingdom at London's National Film Theater. It was subsequently shown by Channel 4 television.

The film is a personal examination of the character & memories of Sydney-born Blakemore, who in real life was a director with a successful career in theatre in the United Kingdom, including a directorship of Britain's National Theatre. The plot revolves around a nostalgic trip home to Sydney and its beaches made by Blakemore, with recollections of his youth and education in the 1930s-1940s, while also reflecting on the history of surfing in Australia. The film also touches on Blakemore's father's ambition for his son to enter the medical profession, whereas Blakemore pursues a life in theatre and film. In creating the project as both director and writer, Blakemore additionally narrates the commentary and also appears in front of the camera, including scenes where he plays his own father.

The film was produced by Adams Packer Film Productions, a short-lived company jointly owned by Kerry Packer and Phillip Adams who were close friends at one stage, with Adams credited as one of the film's co-producers.
