= Dick Bentley =

Australian actor and comedian (1907–1995)

- Born: Charles Walter Bentley; 14 May 1907; Melbourne, Victoria, Australia
- Died: 27 August 1995 (aged 88); London, England
- Occupations: Comedian and actor
- Spouse: Petronella Curra (m. 1939; died 1991)

Charles Walter "Dick" Bentley (14 May 1907 – 27 August 1995) was an Australian-born comedian and actor of radio, stage and screen. He starred with Jimmy Edwards in Take It From Here for BBC Radio. He was a staple of and pioneer of radio, having started his career in the medium in the early 1930s. He appeared on screen from the late 1940s until retiring in 1978.

== Biography ==
=== Early life and radio ===
Bentley was born in Melbourne, Victoria, Australia. As a child, Bentley learned several musical instruments, and while still in his teens was a staple on the Melbourne cabaret circuit as a comedian and singer, his act consisting of playing a few bars of music deliberately badly, interspersed with jokes and legitimate musical numbers. Spotted by Cecil Fraser, he made his first appearance on ABC Radio in the early 1930s and by 1938 had become a fairly prominent personality, notably on Wilfrid Thomas's show Out of the Bag. In that year he moved to London, and worked for the BBC. Newly married to Petronella "Peta" Curra, with the war raging in England, he returned to Australia and spent the years of World War II entertaining the troops in the Pacific theatre.

=== Return to Britain ===
By 1946, he was one of Australia's highest-paid entertainers and returned to Britain to try to re-establish himself in a much larger market. He joined up with writer Denis Norden and guested on many of the leading radio shows of the day. An appearance on Navy Mixture teamed him successfully with Jimmy Edwards, and indirectly led to the pairing of Denis Norden with Frank Muir, who was Edwards' writer. Muir and Norden together wrote Take It From Here (1948–60), with Edwards and Bentley as two of the three stars. The most memorable feature of Take It From Here was The Glums, with Edwards playing the slightly seedy Pa Glum and Bentley his terminally dim son, Ron. Bentley was thirteen years older than Edwards.

In 1951, during the run of Take It From Here, Bentley briefly returned to Australia to star in a ten-episode radio comedy series, Gently Bentley, commissioned to celebrate the silver jubilee of the ABC. In 1954, he starred in And So to Bentley, a sketch-format comedy show for the BBC, co-starring Peter Sellers. The show only lasted for one series, and the gently self-deprecating humour of Bentley was overshadowed by the charismatic Sellers. Both these shows were also written by Muir and Norden.

== Films ==
After making his film debut in 1959, Bentley returned to Australia to play a sheep drover in The Sundowners (1960), starring Robert Mitchum and Deborah Kerr. In the late 1960s, he was briefly back on BBC radio in the short-run comedy series If You Had a Talking Picture of Me. Bentley was featured in the movies The Adventures of Barry McKenzie (1972) and Barry McKenzie Holds His Own (1974), derived from the Barry McKenzie comic strip in Private Eye. By 1974, he had largely retired but briefly returned to the screen to appear in Some Mothers Do 'Ave 'Em (1978) as Frank Spencer's grandad, fittingly since the hapless Spencer was in many ways a descendant of Bentley's Ron Glum character in TIFH.

== Death ==
His wife died in January 1991, and Bentley died from complications from Alzheimer's disease in 1995.

== Filmography ==
Year	Title	Role	Notes
1959	Desert Mice	Gavin	
1960	And the Same to You	George Nibbs	
1960	The Sundowners	Shearer	
1961	Double Bunk	Ron	Voice, Uncredited
1961	In the Doghouse	Mr. Peddle	
1962	The Golden Rabbit	Insp. Jackson	
1962	The Girl on the Boat	American	Uncredited
1963	Tamahine	Storekeeper	
1964	Gunfighters of Casa Grande	Doc	
1972	The Adventures of Barry McKenzie	Detective	
1974	Barry McKenzie Holds His Own	Colin 'The Frog' Lucas	
