= Michael Blakemore =

Australian actor (1928–2023)

- Born: Michael Howell Blakemore; 18 June 1928; Sydney
- Died: 10 December 2023 (aged 95)
- Years active: 1951–2023
- Awards: Drama Desk Award for Outstanding Director of a Play 1984 Noises Off 2000 Copenhagen Drama Desk Award for Outstanding Director of a Musical 2000 Kiss Me, Kate; Tony Award for Best Direction of a Play 2000 Copenhagen Tony Award for Best Direction of a Musical 2000 Kiss Me, Kate

Michael Howell Blakemore AO OBE (18 June 1928 – 10 December 2023) was an Australian actor, writer and theatre director who also made some films. A former Associate Director of the National Theatre, in 2000 he became the only individual to win Tony Awards for Best Director of a Play and Musical in the same year for Copenhagen and Kiss Me, Kate.

== Biography ==
=== Early life and career ===
Michael Howell Blakemore was born in Sydney, the son of Conrad Howell Blakemore, an eye surgeon, and his wife, Una Mary Litchfield. He married English actress Shirley Bush. Blakemore was educated at The King's School, Sydney, and went on to study medicine at the University of Sydney but failed his examinations.

Blakemore's first job in the theatre was as a press agent for Robert Morley during the Australian tour of Edward, My Son, who advised him to try drama school. In 1950 he came to London, enrolled at the Royal Academy of Dramatic Art and trained as an actor until 1952. He made his first professional stage appearance in 1952 at the Theatre Royal, Huddersfield, as the doctor in The Barretts of Wimpole Street.

Blakemore then worked for several years in repertory including Birmingham Repertory Company, Bristol and Coventry, and made his first London appearance at the Princes Theatre in March 1958 as Jack Poyntz in the musical play School. He also played small parts at Stratford in the Shakespeare Memorial Theatre's 1959 season. It was at the latter that he met and worked with Laurence Olivier and Peter Hall.

=== Turns to directing ===
Blakemore appeared in two seasons at the Open Air Theatre, Regent's Park, playing Sir Toby Belch in Twelfth Night and Holofernes in Love's Labour's Lost in 1962; Dogberry in Much Ado About Nothing and Theseus in A Midsummer Night's Dream in 1963. At the Comedy Theatre in December 1963 he played Badger in Toad of Toad Hall, then toured Australia as Palmer Anderson in A Severed Head. He joined the Glasgow Citizens 1966–67, where his parts included George in Who's Afraid of Virginia Woolf? and Maitland in Inadmissible Evidence. During this period and after acting for some 15 years, Blakemore decided that his true calling was in directing. For the Citizens' Theatre in Glasgow he directed The Investigation, Little Malcolm, Stephen D and Nightmare Abbey in 1966; and The Strange Case of Martin Richter, The Visions of Simone Machard, A Choice of Wars and Rosmersholm in 1967. He became its Co-Artistic Director in 1968 and had great success with Peter Nichols's A Day in the Death of Joe Egg in 1967, accompanying the play on its moves to London that year and to Broadway in 1968, earning his first Tony nomination for directing.

Blakemore was dialogue director on the 1965 film Catch Us If You Can.

=== National Theatre ===
In 1969 Blakemore joined the National Theatre at the Old Vic to direct The National Health by Peter Nichols. He later directed Laurence Olivier in Eugene O'Neill's Long Day's Journey into Night (1971). In 1970, as the National Theatre began a slow, and much delayed, transition from the Old Vic premises to the multi-stage South Bank site, Blakemore was invited by Laurence Olivier to become one of two Associate Directors. Since Olivier had already suffered from medical crises that were a feature of the last quarter of his life, the question of eventual succession as Artistic Director was obviously in the background. Blakemore felt he was a probable candidate, and indeed, according to Olivier's biographer Philip Ziegler, he was highly favoured.

But in 1973 the Board of the National Theatre appointed Peter Hall without consulting Olivier. Blakemore wrote:

"It was a little like a putsch, and people were separated from one another by private concerns: what did the future hold and would they still keep their jobs?"

Blakemore and Hall had been rivals during the 1959 season at the Royal Shakespeare Company when Hall had directed Blakemore as an actor and both had had a great romantic interest in Vanessa Redgrave. Blakemore became one of ten associate directors forming what was called a planning committee. Blakemore and Hall's rivalry was dramatised when Blakemore presented a formal manifesto to the committee recommending reform. The committee refused to discuss the manifesto and Blakemore was eventually forced to resign when his salary was stopped without warning or explanation. His other productions included Tyger by Adrian Mitchell, co-directed with John Dexter (1971), The Front Page by Ben Hecht and Charles MacArthur (1972), Macbeth (1972), The Cherry Orchard (translated by Ronald Hingley, 1973), Grand Manoeuvres (1974), Engaged by W. S. Gilbert (1975), and Plunder by Ben Travers (1976).

=== Later career ===
In 1977 he joined the Royal Shakespeare Company to direct Peter Nichols' Privates on Parade. He became resident director of the Lyric Theatre, Hammersmith in 1980, where he directed Michael Frayn's Make and Break, opening on 12 March, starring Leonard Rossiter and Prunella Scales, and which in a revised version transferred on 24 April to the Theatre Royal Haymarket. This was followed in October 1980 by Ibsen's The Wild Duck in a new translation by Ronald Hingley; and in February 1982 by the world premiere of Frayn's Noises Off before its transfer to the Savoy Theatre.

His association with playwright Michael Frayn, which began at the Lyric Hammersmith with Make and Break (1980) and Noises Off (1982), continued with Frayn's Benefactors (Vaudeville, 1984), Frayn's translation of Uncle Vanya (Vaudeville, 1988), and his original plays, Here (Donmar Warehouse, 1993) and Now You Know (Hampstead, 1995). In 1980, Blakemore was invited to direct a series of four plays at the newly reconstructed Lyric Theatre (Hammersmith) by Artistic Director Bill Thomley. The Board made it known that they were looking for a new Artistic Director, and Blakemore decided to put his name forward. However, the job went to Peter James.

After an absence of many years, Blakemore returned to the National to direct Frayn's play Copenhagen in May 1998, before its transfer to the Duchess Theatre in February 1999. This was followed by Alarms and Excursions (Gielgud, September 1998), Democracy (National, Cottesloe, September 2003; Wyndham's, April 2004), and Afterlife (National, Lyttelton, June 2008).

In addition to his work in the subsidised theatre, Blakemore has directed many productions in the West End and on Broadway, including Noël Coward's Design for Living with Vanessa Redgrave (1973), David Hare's first play, Knuckle (1974), Peter Shaffer's Lettice and Lovage with Maggie Smith and Margaret Tyzack (1987), the musical City of Angels by Larry Gelbart, Cy Coleman and David Zippel (1989) and Arthur Miller's The Ride Down Mt. Morgan (1991).

In 1995 he directed the off-Broadway production of Death Defying Acts, composed of three one-act plays (Central Park West by Woody Allen, The Interview by David Mamet and Hotline by Elaine May). Also Coleman's The Life (1997), the revival of Kiss Me, Kate (1999), Embers by Christopher Hampton, with Jeremy Irons at the Duke of York's Theatre in London (March 2006) and, on Broadway, Deuce by Terrence McNally (April 2007) starring Angela Lansbury and Marian Seldes . Blakemore's production of Is He Dead?, a comic play by Mark Twain, never previously produced, opened on Broadway in November 2007 with a run of 105 performances . In 2014 Blakemore directed Angela Lansbury once more, in the critically acclaimed West End production of "Blithe Spirit". His most recent production was the London premiere of 'The Life', staged at the Southwark Playhouse in 2017, starring Sharon D Clarke.

=== Film ===
Blakemore directed and scripted the documentary, A Personal History of the Australian Surf: The Confessions of a Straight Poofter (1981), in which he appeared as himself. Tom Milne, reviewing it for the Time Out Film Guide, described the film as, "basically a home movie in which theatre director Blakemore traces his graduation from Bondi Beach to National Theatre." He followed with the film version of Privates on Parade (1982) featuring Denis Quilley and John Cleese. In 1994, Blakemore wrote and directed Country Life. In this adaptation of Chekhov's Uncle Vanya, transferred to an Australian setting, he also played the role of Alexander who has left the London literary scene to return to his roots. The film received five nominations from the Australian Film Institute and was entered into the 19th Moscow International Film Festival.

== Death ==
Michael Blakemore died on 10 December 2023 at the age of 95 following a short illness.

== Filmography ==
=== Film ===
Year	Title	Role	Notes
1959	The Captain's Table	Steward	Uncredited
1959	Operation Amsterdam	British Officer	Uncredited
1959	The Heart of a Man	Man	Uncredited
1959	A Midsummer Night's Dream	Tom Snout	TV film
1965	Catch Us If You Can	Officer	
1981	A Personal History of the Australian Surf	Self	Autobiographical documentary
1994	Country Life	Alexander Voysey	

=== Television ===
Year	Title	Role	Notes
1956	The Adventures of Sir Lancelot	Cedric	Episode: "The Black Castle"
1958	Armchair Theatre	Bradley	Episode: "The Pillars of Midnight"
1958	ITV Playhouse	Peter Gilbert	Episode: "The Browning Version"
1959	The Larkins	Shop Manager	Episode: "Gift Horse Power"
1959	ITV Play of the Week	Makepeace 'Pym' Lovell	Episode: "No Time for Comedy"
1960	ITV Play of the Week	Walter Clavering	Episode: "Vitriol"
1960	Armchair Mystery Theatre	Newscaster	Episode: "Free Fall"
1961	The Skewbald	Mr. Blair	Episode: "Surprise Encounters"
1961	Our Mister Ambler		Episode: "The Old Master"
1961	ITV Playhouse	Lewis	Episode: "The Reception"
1961	ITV Play of the Week	Public Relations Officer	Episode: "Countdown at Woomera"
1963	Suspense	Stephen	Episode: "The Man on the Bicycle"
1964	Redcap	Captain Jameson	Episode: "Misfire"
1964	Dixon of Dock Green	Matthews	Episode: "Routine"
1984	The Last Bastion	John Curtin	Mini-series

== Honours, awards and nominations ==
Honours

- 2003 – Officer of the Order of Australia
- 2003 – Officer of the Order of the British Empire

Awards

- 1967 – Evening Standard Award Best Play – A Day in the Death of Joe Egg
- 1971 – Variety Magazine London Drama Critics Best Director – Forget-Me-Not Lane
- 1972 – Plays and Players Award for Best Director – Long Day's Journey into Night
- 1972 – Plays and Players Award for Best Director – The Front Page
- 2000 – Drama Desk Award Outstanding Director of a Play – Copenhagen
- 2000 – Tony Award for Best Direction of a Play – Copenhagen
- 2000 – Drama Desk Award Outstanding Director of a Musical – Kiss Me, Kate
- 2000 – Tony Award for Best Direction of a Musical – Kiss Me, Kate
- 2003 – Helpmann Award for Best Direction of a Play – Copenhagen
- 2010 – Inducted into the American Theater Hall of Fame.

Nominations

- 1968 – Tony Award for Best Direction of a Play – A Day in the Death of Joe Egg
- 1984 – Tony Award for Best Direction of a Play – Noises Off
- 1984 – Drama Desk Award Outstanding Director of a Play – Noises Off
- 1990 – Tony Award for Best Direction of a Play – Lettice and Lovage
- 1990 – Tony Award for Best Direction of a Musical – City of Angels
- 1990 – Drama Desk Award Outstanding Director of a Musical – City of Angels
- 1997 – Tony Award for Best Direction of a Musical – The Life
- 1997 – Drama Desk Award Outstanding Direction of a Musical – The Life
- 2002 – Laurence Olivier Award Best Director – Kiss Me, Kate
- 2003 – London Evening Standard Sydney Edwards Award – Democracy
- 2005 – Helpmann Award for Best Direction of a Play – Democracy

== Bibliography ==
- Blakemore, Michael (1969). Next Season. New York: Simon and Schuster. OCLC 438604.
- Blakemore, Michael (2004). Arguments with England. London: Faber. ISBN 0-571-22445-8.
- Blakemore, Michael (2013). Stage Blood. London: Faber & Faber. p. 368. ISBN 978-0571241378.
- Herbert, Ian; Baxter, Christine; Finlay, Robert E (1981). Who's Who in the Theatre (17th ed.). Detroit: Gale. ISBN 0-8103-0234-9.
- Callow, Simon (1997). The National Theatre and its Work 1963–1997. Nick Hern Books. ISBN 1-85459-323-4.
- Ziegler, Philip (2014). Olivier. MacLehose Press. p. 352. ISBN 978-1623650421.
