= The Adventures of Barry McKenzie =

1972 Australian film by Bruce Beresford

- UK 30th Anniversary DVD cover
- Directed by: Bruce Beresford
- Written by: Bruce Beresford; Barry Humphries
- Based on: the comic strip by Barry Humphries drawn by Nicholas Garland
- Produced by: Phillip Adams
- Starring: Barry Crocker; Barry Humphries; Spike Milligan; Peter Cook
- Cinematography: Donald McAlpine
- Edited by: John Scott; William Anderson
- Music by: Peter Best
- Production company: Longford Productions
- Distributed by: Phillip Adams; Columbia Pictures Video Ltd.
- Release date: 12 October 1972
- Running time: 114 minutes
- Country: Australia
- Language: English
- Budget: A$250,000

The Adventures of Barry McKenzie is a 1972 Australian comedy film directed by Bruce Beresford (in his feature film directorial debut) and starring Barry Crocker and Barry Humphries. The film was produced by Phillip Adams.

It tells the story of an Australian yobbo on his travels to the United Kingdom. Barry McKenzie was originally a character created by Barry Humphries for a cartoon strip in the satirical magazine Private Eye. It was the first Australian film to surpass one million dollars in Australian box office receipts. A sequel, Barry McKenzie Holds His Own, was produced in 1974.

Barry Humphries appears in several roles, including: a hippie, Barry McKenzie's psychiatrist Doctor de Lamphrey, and as Aunt Edna Everage (later Dame Edna Everage). Humphries later achieved fame with the character of Dame Edna in the UK and US.

== Plot summary ==
Barry 'Bazza' McKenzie travels to England with his aunt Edna Everage to advance his cultural education. Bazza is a young Aussie, fond of beer, Bondi and beautiful sheilas. He settles in Earls Court, where his old friend Curly has a flat. He gets drunk, is ripped off, insulted by pretentious Englishmen, and exploited by record producers, religious charlatans and a BBC television producer. He reluctantly leaves England under the orders of his aunt, after exposing himself on television. His final words on the plane home are, "I was just starting to like the Poms!"

== Cast ==
- Barry Crocker as Barry McKenzie
- Barry Humphries as Aunt Edna/Hoot/Meyer de Lamphrey
- Peter Cook as Dominic
- Spike Milligan as landlord
- Dick Bentley as detective
- Dennis Price as Mr Gort
- Julie Covington as Blanche
- Avice Landone as Mrs Gort
- Joan Bakewell as herself
- Paul Bertram as Curly
- Mary Anne Severne as Lesley
- Jonathan Hardy as Groove Courtney
- Jenny Tomasin as Sarah Gort
- Chris Malcolm as Sean
- Judith Furse as Claude
- Maria O'Brien as Caroline Thighs
- John Joyce as Maurie Miller
- Margo Lloyd as Mrs McKenzie
- Brian Tapply as avant-garde composer
- John Clarke as an underground filmmaker
- Wilfred Grove as customs officer
- William Rushton as man on plane
- Bernard Spear as taxi driver
- Jack Watling as TV director
- Alexander Archdale
- Clive James as man passed out at party (uncredited)

== Production ==
Bruce Beresford was living in London and knew Barry Humphries socially when he heard about government funding being given to Australian films.

I said to Barry Humphries that we should do a script from the comic strip because they had money available to make films but it hadn't occurred to them that they had no one to make them. I said, "I don't think they've thought about that but if we whip back to Australia with a script, with you starring in it and we're all set to go, we have a good chance of getting the money. There wouldn't be all that many going for it." And that's more or less what happened.

The film was entirely funded by the Australian Film Development Corporation. Shooting started in London in January 1972, with the unit moving to Australia in February. Local unions complained about the presence of British technicians in the crew, but a compromise was reached where Australian technicians joined the crew. Filming ended in March.

Phillip Adams wanted to cast Paul Hogan as Curly but he turned down the role. "I suspect he was concerned over his ability to work with professional actors," says Adams.

== Themes ==
The film explores the cultural distance between Australian popular culture and the manners and mores of England, both nations presented in hyperbolically satirical manner. Barry is the extreme embodiment of "Ockerism" of the late fifties and mid-sixties Australia. Swearing, excessive drinking, vomiting, sexism, rowdiness and other crassness is glorified. The film also plays with the ideas of the era where the sixties cultural revolution had swept aside the certainties of classical education.

The film's success has been put down to the fact the characters, while broad, still had a connection to reality.

== Soundtrack ==
A soundtrack album was released by Fable Records (FBSA 026). It reached number 62 in the Australian Kent Music Report chart.

== Release ==
Phillip Adams initially insisted on distributing the film himself, as had been done with an earlier film Adams had co-produced, The Naked Bunyip (1970). Barry McKenzie was very popular at the box office in Australia and London, and the production company repaid the government most of its money within three months of release. Beresford went on to direct Barry McKenzie Holds His Own – again to great commercial success – in 1974.

Beresford said in a 1999 interview that both films were detrimental to his career.

Personally, it was a massive mistake for me to do it, a massive mistake, because the film was so badly received critically. Instead of getting me work, even though it was successful commercially, it put me out of work ... I couldn't find anything else to make because the films were so reviled critically that I thought that, with these two films, I'll never work again.

He added that "Luckily Phillip Adams saved my life by offering me Don's Party (1976). But that was a couple of years later." Don's Party and Breaker Morant (1980) restored Beresford's reputation.

== Reception ==
=== Critical ===
The Monthly Film Bulletin wrote:

A tasty enough treat for confirmed fans, the film version of Barry Humphries' rambling tale of English low life seen through an innocent Australian eye may – because of the concreteness of film that inevitably puts a damper on Humphries' wild imagination – puzzle, if not actually revolt, newcomers to the idiom. Barry McKenzie and his horrendous Aunt Edna (incarnated here by Barry Humphries) have become the twin but opposing fetishes of an antipodean cult which may well symbolise Humphries' mixed feelings towards his mother country. On the one hand, the coarse but wholesome Barry, "cracking tubes", "chundering" and "exercising the ferret", but for all his crudity, essentially innocent; on the other, the appalling Edna, outwardly respectable in satin duster coat and lovely sheaf of fleshpink gladdies, but inwardly apoplectic with suppressed innuendo. Edna is Humphries' strongest creation, and while her presence keeps the film alive, none of the other characters quite achieve a similar satiric intensity in her absence. ... There are grounds for assuming that Humphries' portrayal of Australian mores is no parody but a scarcely embroidered imitation.

Leslie Halliwell said:

Occasionally funny, defiantly crude and tasteless, but poorly produced comedy-misadventure from the Private Eye comic strip. Australian slang combines with bad sound recording to make much of the film unintelligible.

The Radio Times Guide to Films gave the film 3/5 stars, writing:"

This is a scrappy but often hilarious screen version of the Private Eye comic strip, with Barry Crocker escorting his Aunt Edna Everage through England's grottiest highways and dirtiest byways, and ending with Humphries "flashing his nasty" in front of Joan Bakewell on a late-night TV show. Words like "chunder" and "tubes of beer" entered the English language and frankly, possums, a lot of it is disgusting.

=== Box office ===
This was the first Australian film to surpass $1 million at the national box office, and it led the Australian box office in 1972. The film recovered its $250,000 budget within a few months of release.
