= And So to Bentley =

1954 British TV comedy series

And So to Bentley was a British BBC comedy television series, which aired in 1954. The scripts were written by Denis Norden and Frank Muir. Six episodes were produced, starring Dick Bentley, Peter Sellers, Rosemary Miller, Charlotte Mitchel and Herbert Mostyn. The series was regarded as a flop.

Herbert Mostyn was a notional BBC voice actor, created by Muir and Norden, for convenience when they took small acting parts in the BBC radio comedy programmes they had written (and thus earned acting as well as writing fees). Mostyn was listed in the performing credits for countless BBC radio programmes, as Norden admitted in a radio interview of 2013, but otherwise never existed. Herbert and Mostyn were, respectively, the middle names of Muir and Norden.
