= Eliza Aria =

2003 operatic vocalise

Sheet music

Eliza Aria is an operatic vocalise from the 2003 ballet Wild Swans, composed by Elena Kats-Chernin. The piece was first recorded by soprano Jane Sheldon and the Tasmanian Symphony Orchestra, and released on the ABC Classics label.

This recording was subsequently used in a series of television and cinema advertisements for British bank Lloyds under the tagline "For the journey", launched in January 2007. The adverts were created by agency Rainey Kelly Campbell Roalfe Y&R, and feature animations by Studio AKA. Following the initial minute-long advert, further 30-second instalments were aired.

It began to receive radio airplay in December 2007. In April 2010, research undertaken by PRS for Music revealed that the song is the third most performed in UK television advertising.

Following the success of the advertisements, the recording of the suite was re-issued by ABC Classics with a new cover depicting a scene from the advert and from 2011 onwards has been used as the theme music for the ABC Radio National programme Late Night Live, replacing another piece of hers, the ragtime "Russian Rag".

At the conclusion of the 2018 Commonwealth Games at the Gold Coast, Queensland, Australia, Australian soprano Greta Bradman and boy treble Luke Harrison, supported by the Queensland Ballet and guitarist Karin Schaupp, performed "Eliza Aria" during the lowering and handover of the Commonwealth Federation flag from the 2018 Commonwealth Games to the 2022 Commonwealth Games in Birmingham, England.
