= Robin Luke =

American rock and roll singer (born 1942)

Robin Luke (born 20 March 1942, Los Angeles, California, United States) is an American rock and roll singer who is best known for his 1958 song, "Susie Darlin'". He later worked as a University professor in Marketing. Luke has been enshrined in the Rockabilly Hall of Fame.

== Biography ==
Robin Luke was discovered by Hawaii entrepreneur Kimo Wilder McVay. Luke was living in Honolulu, Hawaii, attending Punahou School, in 1958 when he wrote and recorded "Susie Darlin'", a song named after his then five-year-old sister, Susie. The track reached #5 on the Billboard Hot 100 and #23 on the UK Singles Chart, selling over one million copies and earning a gold disc. He continued to record, but was unable to repeat his chart success. His first four singles were recorded for the small International Records label in Honolulu. After "Susie Darlin'" started getting local airplay, Dot Records bought his recording contract and the International master tapes.

Robin Luke stated that he never envisioned pursuing music as a career and quit the professional music business in 1965. As of 2012, he still performs occasionally on the side. He received his Ph.D. in Business Administration and Marketing at the University of Missouri-Columbia, and served as a professor at Old Dominion University, the University of the Virgin Islands, and Missouri State University. He became Department Head at Old Dominion University and founded the marketing department at Missouri State University.

He retired professionally in 2011.

== Discography ==
=== Singles ===
Year	Title	Peak chart positions			Record Label	B-side
Year	Title	US Pop	US R&B	UK	Record Label	B-side
1958	"Susie Darlin'"	5	26	23	Dot	"Living's Loving You"
1958	"Chicka Chicka Honey"	—	—	—	Dot	"My Girl"
1959	"You Can't Stop Me From Dreaming"	—	—	—	Dot	"Strollin' Blues"
1959	"Five Minutes More"	—	—	—	Dot	"Who's Gonna Hold Your Hand"
1959	"Make Me a Dreamer"	—	—	—	Dot	"Walkin' in the Moonlight"
1959	"Bad Boy"	—	—	—	Dot	"School Bus Love Affair"
1960	"Well Oh, Well Oh (Don't You Know)"	—	—	—	Dot	"Everlovin'"
1960	"All Because of You"	—	—	—	Dot	"So Alone"
1961	"Part of a Fool"	—	—	—	Dot	"Poor Little Rich Boy"
1962	"Foggin' up the Windows" (featuring Roberta Shore)	—	—	—	Dot	

=== Albums ===
- Susie Darlin' (Dot 1092 10", 1958)
