= Elena Kats-Chernin =

Australian composer and pianist (born 1957)

Elena Kats-Chernin AO
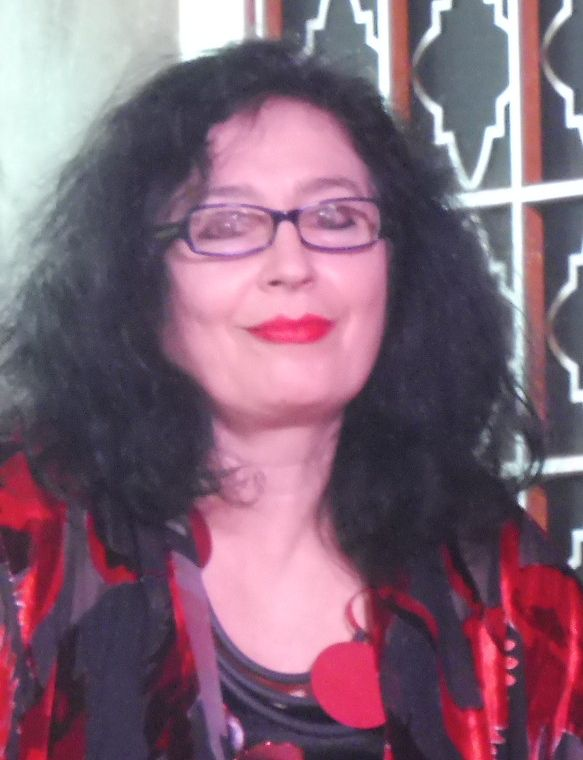
- Kats-Chernin, 2018
- Born: 4 November 1957 (age 68); Tashkent, Uzbek SSR, Soviet Union
- Occupations: Composer, pianist

Elena Davidovna Kats-Chernin AO (born 4 November 1957) is an Australian composer and pianist, best known for her ballet Wild Swans.

== Early life and education ==
Elena Kats-Chernin was born in Tashkent, Uzbek SSR (now the capital of independent Uzbekistan) and is Jewish. Her early life was spent in the Russian SSR after she moved to Yaroslavl at age 4, where she grew up and studied composition at the Sobinov Conservatory. At age 14, she was admitted to the Gnessin State Musical College, and subsequently moved to Moscow for her studies. She later migrated to Australia in 1975, continuing her studies at the Sydney Conservatorium of Music, under Richard Toop (composition) and Gordon Watson (piano). She graduated from the Conservatorium in 1980. She also participated in the Darlinghurst underground theatre scene, with groups such as Cabaret Conspiracy, Fifi Lamour, Boom Boom La Burn and others, often under the name Elena Kats.

After graduating, Kats-Chernin moved to Germany to study under Helmut Lachenmann. She remained in Europe for thirteen years, and became active in theatre and ballet, composing for state theatres in Berlin, Vienna, Hamburg and Bochum.

== Career ==
Since returning to Australia in 1994, Kats-Chernin has written several operas, a ballet, two piano concertos and compositions for many performers and ensembles, including the Australian Chamber Orchestra, the Australian World Orchestra, the Sydney Symphony, the Melbourne Symphony, the Adelaide Symphony, the Tasmanian Symphony, and the Australian Brandenburg Orchestra.

She was commissioned to write a piece, Page Turn, for the 2000 Sydney International Piano Competition. In 2009, Kats-Chernin was commissioned by the National Museum of Australia to write Garden of Dreams, an orchestral piece named for one of the architectural features of the museum, which premiered at the museum the same year. Kats-Chernin's other works include Charleston Noir for solo piano, Rockhampton Garden Symphonies with Mark Svendsen for solo voices, mixed choirs and orchestra, and Wild Swans (ABC Classics) a collaboration with choreographer Meryl Tankard.

She has thrice collaborated with TV channels ZDF and Arte, writing soundtracks to accompany their restorations of classic silent films: the 1995 restoration of Victor Sjöström's The Phantom Carriage, the 1999 restoration of G. W. Pabst's The Devious Path, and the 2005 restoration of Billy Wilder and Robert Siodmak's People on Sunday.

Her music was featured at the opening ceremonies of the 2000 Sydney Olympic Games and the 2003 Rugby World Cup, and at the conclusion of the 2018 Commonwealth Games.

Kats-Chernin's "Eliza Aria" from Wild Swans was used in Lloyds TSB's 2007 television advertisements in Britain. One of Kats-Chernin's ragtime pieces for piano, "Russian Rag", is used as the New York theme in Adam Elliot's ACTAA-nominated animated feature, Mary and Max. Two ensemble arrangements of "Russian Rag" were used as the theme of ABC Radio National's Late Night Live program until 2010, when Wild Swans then became the program's theme until the end of 2015.

She has won numerous music composition prizes in Australia, and her pieces are regularly broadcast on ABC Classic. As of 2026, her pieces have featured in eleven of the station's annual Classic 100 Countdowns. In 2025, Kats-Chernin was the most popular female composer listed in the countdown, with three entries: Eliza Aria at 24, Butterflying at 52 and Russian Rag at 58.

A portrait of Kats-Chernin by Australian portrait artist Wendy Sharpe was acquired by the National Portrait Gallery (Australia) in 2019. A portrait of Kats-Chernin by painter and close friend Jaq Grantford was awarded the People's Choice Award at the 2026 Portia Geach Memorial Award.

Kats-Chernin is a represented composer of the Australian Music Centre.

== Honours and awards ==
Kats-Chernin was appointed an Officer of the Order of Australia (AO) in January 2019 "for distinguished service to the performing arts, particularly to music, as an orchestral, operatic and chamber music composer".

=== ARIA Music Awards ===
The ARIA Music Awards is an annual awards ceremony held by the Australian Recording Industry Association. They commenced in 1987.

| Year | Nominee / work | Award | Result | Ref. |
|---|---|---|---|---|
| 2005 | Wild Swans | Best Classical Album | Nominated | |
| 2008 | Slow Food | Best Classical Album | Nominated | |
| 2017 | A Piece of Quiet (The Hush Collection, Vol. 16) (with Lior and The Idea of North) | Best Children's Album | Nominated | |

=== Australian Women in Music Awards ===
The Australian Women in Music Awards is an annual event that honours women for their contributions to the Australian music industry. They were first awarded in 2018.

| Year | Nominee / work | Award | Result |
|---|---|---|---|
| 2022 | Elena Kats-Chernin | Artistic Excellence Award | Won |
| 2022 | Elena Kats-Chernin | Excellence in Classical Music Award | Nominated |

=== Sidney Myer Performing Arts Awards ===
The Sidney Myer Performing Arts Awards commenced in 1984 and recognise outstanding achievements in dance, drama, comedy, music, opera, circus and puppetry.

| Year | Nominee / work | Award | Result |
|---|---|---|---|
| 2013 | Elena Kats-Chernin | Individual Award | awarded |

== Notable works ==
- The Divorce, for ABC Television, 2015
- The Wind in the Willows, Staatstheater Kassel 2021, adaptation of Kenneth Grahame's children's book The Wind in the Willows
- Simsalabim – Das magische Leben des Dr. Schreiber, Staatsoperette Dresden 2026, the story of the magician Kalanag

=== Ballets ===
- Wild Swans (including "Eliza Aria")

=== Films ===
- The Widower
- Körkarlen (The Phantom Carriage)
- People on Sunday (Menschen am Sonntag)
- Abwege (The Devious Path)
- Varieté (Variety)
- Memoir of a Snail (2024)
