= Susie Darlin' =

Single by Robin Luke
- B-side: "Living’s Loving You"
- Released: July 28, 1958
- Studio: Bertram International Studio, Honolulu, Hawaii
- Length: 2:35
- Label: Dot
- Songwriter: Robin Luke

"Susie Darlin'" is a 1958 single by Robin Luke. Luke's rendition peaked at #5 on the Billboard Hot 100 and went to #1 on the CHUM Chart in 1958. A cover version by Tommy Roe had "Susie Darlin'" re-enter the Billboard Hot 100 in 1962 and peaked at #35. "Susie Darlin'" sold a million copies in the United States.

== Background ==
"Susie Darlin'" was originally titled "All Night Long" but was later re-titled and named after Luke's sister.

Robin Luke started singing professionally in 1957, co-starring on a Honolulu TV show with Kimo McVay, while still attending Punahou High School. He was brought to the attention of Bobby Bertram, owner of the Lariat and Bertram International labels. Luke recorded two self-composed songs (“Susie Darlin’” and “Living’s Loving You”) in Bertram’s bedroom in Honolulu, with the nearby bathroom functioning as an echo chamber. Percussion was created by Bertram by pounding two sticks at a ballpoint pen in his pocket.

== Release ==
"Susie Darlin’”. c/w “Living’s Loving You” were released in May 1958 on Bertram International. Immediately there was massive Hawaiian airplay and ten days later “Susie Darlin’” (inspired by Robin’s five-year old sister Susie) was the best selling record in Honolulu. Luckily for Luke, Art and Dorothy Freeman, Cleveland distributors for the Dot label, were honeymooning in Waikiki when they happened to hear Robin’s record on the radio.

Bertram leased the record to Dot Records for the US mainland market. Reissued on Dot, the single entered the Billboard charts in August 1958, eventually peaked at number five. Luke did a quick tour of the United States and appeared on American Bandstand. As the single climbed the charts, he was brought back for more shows and performed on more national television shows, including the Perry Como Show. In the UK “Susie Darlin'" was released on the London American label (HLD 8676) and reached number 23, in spite of competition from a British cover by Barry Barnett.

== Other versions ==
In 1962, Tommy Roe covered "Susie Darlin'". A few years later, Mike Curb created his own version, titled "Suzie Darling", with some lyrical adjustments in 1965.
A German version was covered by Tommy Kent in 1958 and peaked on the German charts at #4.
In 1973, Australian Barry Crocker released an updated version of Susie Darlin', which peaked at #7 on the Australian charts and charted at #57 for the year overall.

== Chart performance ==
In the United States, Robin Luke's original version of "Susie Darlin'" peaked at No. 5 on the Billboard Hot 100 and No. 26 on the Hot R&B Sides chart in 1958. Outside of the United States, Luke's version of "Susie Darlin'" peaked at No. 1 on the CHUM Chart and No. 23 in the UK that same year. Another charting version of "Susie Darlin'" was Tommy Roe's version, which peaked on the Billboard Hot 100 at No. 35 in 1962.

== Charts ==
=== Robin Luke version ===
Chart (1958)	Peak position
Canada (CHUM)	1
UK Singles (OCC)	23
US Billboard Hot 100	5
US Hot R&B/Hip-Hop Songs (Billboard)	26

=== Tommy Roe version ===
Chart (1962)	Peak position
US Billboard Hot 100	35
