= Alex Stitt =

Australian cartoonist, designer, and filmmaker (1937–2016)

Alexander Arthur Henry Stitt (1 January 1937 – 2 October 2016) was an Australian graphic designer, illustrator, writer, and animator, best known for his work for the Life. Be in it. campaign.

== Early life and education ==
Alexander Arthur Henry Stitt was born on 1 January 1937, the only child of businessman Henry "Harry" Stitt and Violet "Judy" (nee Pellett).

In 1956 (the same year the year television broadcasting began in Australia) he gained a Certificate of Art and Diploma in Advertising Design from Melbourne Technical College (now RMIT University).

== Career ==
After graduating, aged 20, Stitt started work at GTV Nine's Fanfare Films Pty Ltd, whose clients included Fred Schepisi and Phillip Adams. He started doing freelance work for Castle Jackson, an advertising agency in Melbourne, where he started producing some of the first ever animated commercials for television in Australia. From the late 1950s for around twenty years, he created over 100 animated television ads for the Christian Television Association (although not religious himself).

In 1964 Stitt and graphic designer Bruce Weatherhead went into partnership as Weatherhead & Stitt, producing creative print, packaging, corporate image, advertising, and film projects. At that time, they were the only design studio producing both print and broadcast media work.

In 1966, along with Weatherhead and Fred Schepisi, bought out Cinesound Victoria, renaming it The Film House, which became an important player in the "new wave" of Australian filmmaking.

In the late 1960s, he designed a cartoon character known by the acronym ICPOTA ("In the Classified Pages Of The Age") for The Age, which was used on television and in print campaign to promote classified advertising for decades.

In 1970 Stitt and Weatherhead established the Jigsaw Factory, producing toys and other items for children, and in 1973, Stitt formed Al et al Pty Ltd, along with former staff members.

Around 1976, as part of The Film House, he designed graphics for Schepisi's first feature film The Devil's Playground, featuring a grinning devil, that led him to choose that name.

Over a period of around 15 years, he wrote, designed and directed two animated feature films, as well as commissioned work such as advertising campaigns, short films, and film titles.

Stitt also undertook government-commissioned community service campaigns, the most well-known of which were the campaigns to promote healthy living, Life. Be in it. (featuring Norm, created in 1975) and Slip! Slop! Slap! (featuring Sid the Seagull). These campaigns were in association with Phillip Adams, who then worked in advertising. "Life. Be in it." is one of the longest-running advertising campaigns in Australia, as well as one of the most effective public health initiatives. It ran until 1990 and was relaunched in 2022. Norm was even added to the Macquarie Dictionary. "Slip! Slop! Slap!" was first commissioned by the Anti-Cancer Council of Victoria in 1981, before being expanded across the country. It ran until 1988, and was later refreshed and relaunched in 2007.

In the late 1980s, Stitt produced a logo for the Australian Council for Educational Research "School of the Future" educational technology project. Upon Stitt's suggestion the project was renamed the Sunrise School, and his logo was adopted.

From 1989 or 1990 Stitt started working in partnership with his wife, Paddy, mainly on educational publications. Their business name was Alexander Stitt & Partner.

== Other activities ==
Stitt: Autobiographics, co-authored by Alex and Paddy Stitt, is a graphic memoir of his career.

Alex and Paddy Stitt were supporters of Foundation House, aka Victorian Foundation for Survivors of Torture Inc., working closely with the board during the 2000s. They together created a series of calendars featuring the stories and pictures of refugees, and later designed the logo for the organisation, all on a pro bono basis.

== Recognition and honours ==
Designs by Stitt and Weatherhead won many design awards. In 2002, both of them were inducted into the AGDA Hall of Fame.

In 1973, in its first year of operation, Stitt's Al et al studio won 17 awards in the Melbourne Art Directors' show.

In 2011, Stitt was inducted into the Design Institute of Australia Hall of Fame, "in recognition of his significant contribution to Australian design".

Stitt was awarded a Member of the Order of Australia in early 2016.

== Personal life ==
Stitt married fellow art student Barbara Martin in 1958, and they had two children. The marriage ended around 1973. In 1979, he married Patricia "Paddy" Weatherhead, former wife of Bruce, becoming the stepfather of her two children.

== Later life ==
Stitt officially retired in 2007, moving to a home at Red Hill on the Mornington Peninsula.

He died on 2 October 2016 after a long illness.

== Filmography ==
With Phillip Adams, Stitt wrote, directed, and co-produced the animated films, Grendel Grendel Grendel (1981), featuring the voice of Peter Ustinov, and Abra Cadabra (1983).

With Paddy, in Stitt & Partners, he worked on special effects for Shepisi's films The Russia House (1990) and Mr. Baseball (1992), and the TV miniseries Empire Falls (2005).

He also produced graphics for the following films:

- The Barry Mackenzie films
- The Devil's Playground (1976)
- Don's Party (1976)
- The Chant of Jimmy Blacksmith (1978)
- Water Under the Bridge (TV miniseries, 1980)
- Silent Reach (TV miniseries, 1983)
- Careful, He Might Hear You (1983)
- Six Degrees of Separation (1993)
