= Ideas Festival =

Former festival held in Brisbane, Australia

The Ideas Festival was a festival held in Brisbane, Australia, biennially between 2001 and 2011. Its purpose was to present ideas, promote public debate, and to foster and celebrate innovation in Queensland.

== History ==
The Ideas Festival was established in 2001 to present ideas, promote public debate, and to foster and celebrate innovation in Queensland. The biennial event was presented by the Queensland Government. It was held in 2001, 2003, 2006, 2009 and 2011.

In 2001 and 2003, the Ideas Festival was presented in partnership with the Brisbane City Council at the Powerhouse. In 2006 the festival shifted to the South Bank Parklands, Brisbane supported by the Queensland Government.

In 2009 the program was delivered by Arts Queensland as part of the Q150 celebrations and the Year of Creativity, with Griffith University supporting as a major sponsor. The 2009 event presented over 100 speakers, 138 sessions and recorded attendances of over 22,000.

The 2011 event was delivered in partnership with the State Library of Queensland, and included "Flood of Ideas", an exhibition of ideas on planning for and responding to floods.

== Description ==
The festival was an open public event, incorporating programming for children and schools, youth and the general public. Topics explored throughout the festival were broad, focusing on innovation and creativity across all industries.
