= Wild Swans (ballet) =

2003 ballet

Wild Swans is a 2003 ballet by Meryl Tankard with score by Australian composer Elena Kats-Chernin.

== Ballet ==
The story is based on the fairy tale "The Wild Swans" by Hans Christian Andersen and tells the tale of Eliza, a princess whose wicked-witch stepmother has changed Eliza's eleven brothers into swans. Eliza must knit magic shirts from stinging nettles in order to break the spell and transform her brothers back into human form. With its basis in a fairy tale, the 90-minute ballet follows in the tradition of Tchaikovsky's The Nutcracker and Swan Lake, with ballet scores by Russian-born composers Prokofiev and Stravinsky also acknowledged influences.

The ballet was commissioned by the Australian Ballet and the Sydney Opera House. The score was completed in 2002 in collaboration with choreographer Meryl Tankard, who had also worked with Kats-Chernin on part of the opening ceremony for the 2000 Sydney Olympics. It was given its premiere by the Australian Ballet at the Sydney Opera House on 29 April 2003.

== Suite ==
Kats-Chernin arranged a 12-movement concert suite from the ballet score. This was recorded in 2004 by the Tasmanian Symphony Orchestra conducted by Ola Rudner, with soprano Jane Sheldon, and released on the ABC Classics label along with the composer's Piano Concerto and the orchestral composition Mythic (2004). The 30-minute suite features prominent parts for the soprano soloist, percussion, in particular the xylophone, and alto saxophone.

The suite was given its Australian concert premiere on 18 May 2008, by Matthew Krel conducting the SBS Radio and Television Youth Orchestra with soprano Simone Easthope at the Verbrugghen Hall of the Sydney Conservatorium of Music.

=== Movements ===
1. Green Leaf (2:39)
2. Eliza Aria (3:17)
3. Brothers (1:50)
4. Wicked Witch (1:51)
5. Magic Spell Tango (3:42)
6. Good Fairy (3:16)
7. Knitting Nettles (3:17)
8. Darkness in the Forest (3:43)
9. Eliza and the Prince (3:55)
10. Glow Worms (1:28)
11. Mute Princess (3:50)
12. Transformation (3:59)
