= Jameel v Wall Street Journal Europe Sprl =

Jameel v Wall Street Journal Europe
- Court: House of Lords
- Decided: 11 October 2006
- Citations: [2007] 1 AC 359; [2006] 4 All ER 1279; [2006] UKHL 44; [2006] HRLR 41; [2007] Bus LR 291; [2006] 3 WLR 642; [2007] EMLR 2; [2007] EMLR 14; 21 BHRC 471

Case history
- Prior action: [2005] EWCA Civ 74

Court membership
- Judges sitting: Lord Bingham of Cornhill; Lord Hoffmann; Lord Hope of Craighead; Lord Scott of Foscote; Baroness Hale of Richmond

Jameel & Ors v Wall Street Journal Europe Sprl was a House of Lords judgment on English defamation law. The issue was whether the defamatory article was protected by Reynolds privilege. The judgment was an affirmation of Reynolds v Times Newspapers Ltd and effectively upholds a public interest defence in libel cases.
