= Peter Best (composer) =

Australian film composer

- Born: 1943 (age 82–83); Adelaide, South Australia, Australia
- Occupation: Composer
- Years active: 1967–present
- Known for: Film scores for Crocodile Dundee, Muriel's Wedding, We of the Never Never
- Awards: Australian Film Institute Award for Best Original Music Score (1977, 1985, 1995, 1997)

Peter Best is an Australian composer who has created or contributed to many film scores.

His career started in 1967.

In 1969, the founders of Producers Authors Composers and Talent (now PACT Centre for Emerging Artists) attended a Sydney University Architecture Revue, with sets by Geoffrey Atherden and Grahame Bond, and invited Bond, Atherden, Peter Weir, and Best a chance to do a show at the National Art School. Sir Robert Helpmann saw the show and took it to the Adelaide Festival, and soon afterwards Weir and Bond were commissioned to write a Christmas special TV show for ABC Television, called Man on a Green Bike.

He has worked on such films as The Adventures of Barry McKenzie (1972), Barry McKenzie Holds His Own (1974), End Play (1976), The Picture Show Man (1977), We of the Never Never (1982), Goodbye Paradise (1983), Bliss (1985), Crocodile Dundee (1986), Crocodile Dundee II (1988), Muriel's Wedding (1994), Doing Time for Patsy Cline (1997) and My Mother Frank (2000).

Many of his scores have been released on compact disc (CD), including Crocodile Dundee on Varèse Sarabande, and We of the Never Never on 1M1 Records.

He was also responsible for the theme music for several TV commercials, including the health initiative Life. Be in it., Care For Kids (International Year of the Child 1979), Slip Slop Slap (Cancer Council Victoria), and Rosella (Only the Best to You).

== Awards ==
=== ARIA Music Awards ===
The ARIA Music Awards is an annual awards ceremony held by the Australian Recording Industry Association. They commenced in 1987.

Year	Nominee / work	Award	Result	Ref.
1987	"Crocodile" Dundee	Best Original Soundtrack, Cast or Show Album	Nominated	

=== Australian Film Institute Award for Best Original Music Score ===
- 1977 – The Picture Show Man
- 1985 – Rebel: Original Motion Picture Soundtrack with Ray Cook, Chris Neal, Billy Byers, Bruce Rowland
- 1995 – Dad and Dave: On Our Selection
- 1997 – Doing Time for Patsy Cline
