= Grendel Grendel Grendel =

- VHS film cover
- Directed by: Alexander Stitt
- Screenplay by: Alexander Stitt
- Based on: Grendel by John Gardner
- Produced by: Phillip Adams; Alexander Stitt
- Starring: Peter Ustinov; Arthur Dignam; Keith Michell
- Narrated by: Peter Ustinov
- Cinematography: John Pollard
- Music by: Bruce Smeaton
- Production company: Victorian Film
- Distributed by: Satori Corporation; Umbrella Entertainment
- Release date: 9 July 1981
- Running time: 88 minutes
- Country: Australia
- Language: English
- Budget: AU$550,000 (est.)

Grendel Grendel Grendel is a 1981 Australian animated film written, directed and designed by Alexander Stitt and starring Peter Ustinov. It was based on John Gardner's novel Grendel. The music was composed and conducted by Bruce Smeaton and has been released on the 1M1 Records label.

Like Gardner's novel, the film is a retelling of part of the epic poem Beowulf from the monster Grendel's point of view. Grendel (voiced by Ustinov) is by turns a thoughtful and contemplative character and a rampaging monster who attacks the mead hall of an early Danish kingdom, biting the head off of one would-be defender. This was the second full-length fully animated film ever made in Australia (coming after 1972's Marco Polo Junior Versus the Red Dragon).

== Plot ==
Initially narrated by the titular character through a flashback, Grendel (Peter Ustinov), the "Great Boogey", recounts how he first left his cave as a child and encountered the Danish King Hrothgar (Ed Rosser) and his thegns. After being rescued by his mother, Grendel ponders over the similarities he shares with the Danes, yet laments on their not being able to understand his language. He watches as Hrothgar's power and wealth grows, disgusted at his excesses and the royal Shaper's (Keith Michell) revisions of history that present the king's underhanded and brutal achievements as glorious victories. Desperate to find meaning in life, Grendel encounters the dragon (Arthur Dignam), who informs Grendel that his sole purpose in life is to terrify humanity, thus stimulating human imagination and encouraging social cohesion.

Grendel accepts his new role and regularly visits the king's mead hall to frighten Hrothgar's people and devour them. He stops short of killing the king himself and the warrior Unferth (Ric Stone), whose delusions of grandeur and passive opposition to the king amuse Grendel. Feeling sympathy for Hrothgar's miserable wife Wealhtheow, who is also the object of Unferth's secret affection, Grendel decides to finally kill Hrothgar and take her to his lair. Before Grendel can arrive, the meadhall is visited by the hero Beowulf (also voiced by Dignam), who kills Unferth on the increasingly paranoid Hrothgar's orders. Beowulf then ambushes Grendel and tears off his arm, leaving the monster to die outside, pondering over the accidental nature of his death.

== Voices ==
- Peter Ustinov - Grendel
- Keith Michell - The Shaper
- Arthur Dignam - The Dragon, Beowulf
- Ed Rosser - King Hrothgar
- Bobby Bright - Additional Voices
- Ric Stone - Unferth
- Ernie Bourne - Additional Voices
- Rho Schepisi - Additional Voices
- Colin McEwan - Additional Voices
- Alison Bird - Wealhtheow
- Barry Hill - Additional Voices
- Peter Aanensen - Additional Voices
- Jack Brown - Additional Voices
- Julie McKenna - The Shaper's Boy

=== Uncredited ===
- Phillip Adams - Narrator

== Production and release ==
Stitt acquired the film rights to Grendel in 1978, and work was commenced at Melbourne Al et al. Studios the following year. The film was conceived as a coproduction with producer Phillip Adams, under the banner of Animation Australia. Although completed in 1981, it was not released in US theatres until the spring of 1982. Because of its limited appeal, broadcasting of the film was largely restricted to art theatres in urban centres.
