= Reynolds v Times Newspapers Ltd =

Leading English defamation case of 1999

- Court: House of Lords
- Full case name: Reynolds v Times Newspapers Ltd and Others
- Decided: 1999
- Citation: [1999] UKHL 45, [1999] 4 All ER 609, [2001] 2 AC 127

Case history
- Prior actions: [1998] EMLR 723 [1998] 3 WLR 862
- Subsequent action: [2001] 2 AC 127 (HL)

Court membership
- Judges sitting: Court of Appeal: Lord Bingham of Cornhill CJ, Hirst and Robert Walker LJJ House of Lords: Lord Nicholls of Birkenhead, Lord Hope of Craighead, Lord Steyn, Lord Cooke of Thorndon Lord Hobhouse of Woodborough

Keywords
- defamation, public interest

Reynolds v Times Newspapers Ltd was a House of Lords case in English defamation law concerning qualified privilege for publication of defamatory statements in the public interest. The case provided the Reynolds defence, which could be raised where it was clear that the journalist had a duty to publish an allegation even if it turned out to be wrong.

In adjudicating on an attempted Reynolds defence a court would investigate the conduct of the journalist and the content of the publication. The subsequent case of Jameel v Wall Street Journal Europe affirmed the defence, which was subsequently raised successfully in several defamation proceedings. The defence was abolished by s4(6) Defamation Act 2013, being replaced with the statutory defence of publication on a matter of public interest.

== Facts ==
Albert Reynolds had been the taoiseach (prime minister) of Ireland until a political crisis in 1994. The Times had published an article in Ireland to the effect that Reynolds had misled the Irish Parliament; this article was then published in the United Kingdom. However, the UK version omitted an explanation that Reynolds had given for the events, which had been printed in the original article. Reynolds brought an action for defamation. The defences of justification and fair comment were unavailable, given the factual nature of the article. Times Newspapers Ltd appealed that the defence of qualified privilege be considered; the Court of Appeal denied this. The appeal to the House of Lords was therefore on the matter of whether the defence of qualified privilege be extended to cover the mass media.

== Lords judgement: the ten criteria ==
Lord Nicholls, speaking for the majority, upheld Lord Bingham's judgement in the Court of Appeal, adding to it a non-exhaustive list of ten criteria against which attempts to use the defence of qualified privilege should be judged:

The elasticity of the common law principle enables interference with freedom of speech to be confined to what is necessary in the circumstances of the case. This elasticity enables the court to give appropriate weight, in today's conditions, to the importance of freedom of expression by the media on all matters of public concern.

Depending on the circumstances, the matters to be taken into account include the following. The comments are illustrative only.

1. The seriousness of the allegation. The more serious the charge, the more the public is misinformed and the individual harmed, if the allegation is not true.
2. The nature of the information, and the extent to which the subject-matter is a matter of public concern.
3. The source of the information. Some informants have no direct knowledge of the events. Some have their own axes to grind, or are being paid for their stories.
4. The steps taken to verify the information.
5. The status of the information. The allegation may have already been the subject of an investigation which commands respect.
6. The urgency of the matter. News is often a perishable commodity.
7. Whether comment was sought from the plaintiff. He may have information others do not possess or have not disclosed. An approach to the plaintiff will not always be necessary.
8. Whether the article contained the gist of the plaintiff's side of the story.
9. The tone of the article. A newspaper can raise queries or call for an investigation. It need not adopt allegations as statements of fact.
10. The circumstances of the publication, including the timing.

This list is not exhaustive. The weight to be given to these and any other relevant factors will vary from case to case. Any disputes of primary fact will be a matter for the jury, if there is one. The decision on whether, having regard to the admitted or proved facts, the publication was subject to qualified privilege is a matter for the judge. This is the established practice and seems sound. A balancing operation is better carried out by a judge in a reasoned judgment than by a jury. Over time, a valuable corpus of case law will be built up.

Qualified privilege, as defined and limited by this ruling, became known as the Reynolds defence after this case.

== Subsequent developments ==
The ruling was affirmed in 2006 by the House of Lords in Jameel v Wall Street Journal Europe, where Lord Hoffmann, giving the lead judgment, stated that Lord Nicholls' criteria were not to be seen as obstacles or hurdles that any journalist had to overcome in order to avail him or herself of the privilege.

== Defamation Act 2013 ==
Section 4 of the Defamation Act 2013 created the defence of "publication on a matter of public interest". This replaced the common law Reynolds defence, abolished by subsection 4(6). However the ten criteria set out in Reynolds are still considered relevant in some circumstances when considering whether a publication was in the public interest. See Hay v Cresswell [2023] EWHC 882 (KB) for an illustration of this.

== See also ==
- Walter v Lane, court case involving The Times
- New York Times v. Sullivan, a somewhat related case in the United States
