= The Dame Edna Experience =

1987–1989 British talk-comedy TV series

- Series One DVD cover (North America)
- Created by: Barry Humphries
- Presented by: Dame Edna Everage
- Starring: Barry Humphries; Emily Perry; The Laurie Holloway Orchestra
- Narrated by: Robin Houston
- Country of origin: United Kingdom
- Original language: English
- No. of episodes: 14 (inc. 2 specials)

Production
- Production locations: LWT Studios; London
- Running time: 60 minutes
- Production company: London Weekend Television

Original release
- Network: ITV
- Release: 12 September 1987 – 22 December 1989

Related
- Dame Edna's Neighbourhood Watch; The Dame Edna Treatment; A Night on Mount Edna

The Dame Edna Experience is a British television comedy talk-show hosted by Dame Edna Everage. It ran for twelve regular episodes on ITV, plus two Christmas specials. This show was also aired in re-runs with Dutch subtitles in the Netherlands.

== Programme ==
The first seven aired for the first time in 1987, the next seven in 1989. It was directed by Ian Hamilton and Alasdair MacMillan and produced by London Weekend Television. Regulars on the program, besides Dame Edna, were her "bridesmaid" Madge Allsop (played by Emily Perry) and Robin Houston who was the announcer, with orchestra conducted and arranged by Laurie Holloway.

Each program featured several celebrity guests, usually three, but some programs included up to eight guests. There would also be other invited "guests" (such as Kurt Waldheim and Imelda Marcos), who, once introduced at stage right, would fall victim to a trap door or something similar and fail to make it to their chair.

=== DVD releases ===
The entire series was released on DVD (for Region 1) by BBC Video in June 2004, and can now also be purchased as a complete set including the 1987 Christmas special and the three An Audience with Dame Edna specials, plus other material.

The series was released for Region 2 by Network DVD in the UK in 2007, as a four-disc set. It includes the 1987 Christmas special and the one-off 1990 Christmas special A Night on Mount Edna with guests Mel Gibson, Charlton Heston, Gina Lollobrigida and Julio Iglesias.

For reasons unknown, neither the Region 1 or the Region 2 releases include the 1989 Christmas special "The Dame Edna Satellite Experience" that ended the second series and featured Ursula Andress, Yehudi Menuhin, and Robert Kilroy-Silk.

== Season One episodes and guests ==
- Episode 1, Original Air Date: 12 September 1987 – Sean Connery, Cliff Richard, Mary Whitehouse
- Episode 2, Original Air Date: 19 September 1987 – Jeffrey Archer, Joan Rivers, Demis Roussos
- Episode 3, Original Air Date: 26 September 1987 – Larry Hagman, Arthur Marshall, Jane Seymour
- Episode 4, Original Air Date: 3 October 1987 – Zsa Zsa Gabor, Germaine Greer, Nana Mouskouri
- Episode 5, Original Air Date: 10 October 1987 – Jerry Hall, Charlton Heston, Patrick Lichfield
- Episode 6, Original Air Date: 17 October 1987 – John Mills, Rudolf Nureyev, Barry Humphries, Cynthia Payne
- Episode 7, Original Air Date: 26 December 1987 – Sir Les Patterson, Denis Healey, Lulu, Roger Moore (titled "The Dame Edna Christmas Experience")

Several potential guests were "aborted" throughout the series. Kurt Waldheim, Zsa Zsa Gabor, Larry Hagman and Barry Humphries were announced as guests, but Dame Edna decided to abort the interviews as they entered the set. Hagman and Gabor were permitted to appear after apologising to Dame Edna (off camera), whereas Waldheim and Humphries were not. Charlton Heston fell down the staircase accidentally, preventing his initial interview. Both Jeffrey Archer and Cliff Richard were ejected midway through their interviews; Cliff only as a demonstration and warning to future guests and Archer because Dame Edna was bored with him.

== Season Two episodes and guests ==
- Episode 1, Original Air Date: 4 November 1989 – Chubby Checker, Douglas Fairbanks Jr., Ronald Reagan Jr. and Jane Fonda who was refused entry to the penthouse for wearing a track suit.
- Episode 2, Original Air Date: 11 November 1989 – Magnus Magnusson, Liza Minnelli, Vivienne Westwood
- Episode 3, Original Air Date: 18 November 1989 – Edward Heath, Dolph Lundgren, Dusty Springfield
- Episode 4, Original Air Date: 2 December 1989 – Jason Donovan, Michael Gambon, Glenys Kinnock, Malcolm McDowell, Antony Sher, David Suchet, Tim Pigott-Smith and Jeffrey Archer who was refused entry to the penthouse as he'd bored Dame Edna on his appearance in series 1.
- Episode 5, Original Air Date: 9 December 1989 – Lauren Bacall, Gerald Durrell, Tom Jones and Jeffrey Archer who was refused entry to the penthouse when Dame Edna discovered his disguise.
- Episode 6, Original Air Date: 16 December 1989 – Christiaan Barnard, Tony Curtis, Grace Jones and Jeffrey Archer who got into the penthouse by dressing as Father Christmas to evade Dame Edna's security. Christiaan Barnard performed cosmetic surgery on Madge Allsop who thus was transformed into a look-a-like of Madge Bishop and was played by Anne Charleston for this episode rather than Emily Perry.
- Episode 7, Original Air Date: 22 December 1989 – Ursula Andress, Robert Kilroy-Silk, Yehudi Menuhin (titled "The Dame Edna Satellite Experience")

Both Imelda Marcos and Princess Michael of Kent were introduced as guests, but fell foul of Dame Edna's security system and were ejected from the studio.
