= Madge Allsop =

- First appearance: 1971
- Last appearance: 2019
- Created by: Barry Humphries
- Portrayed by: Madeleine Orr, Connie Hobbs, Emily Perry, Anne Charleston, Kerrie Peelong

In-universe information
- Full name: Marjorie Kiri McWhirter
- Family: Mabel McWhirter (sister)
- Spouse: Douglas Allsop (deceased)
- Relatives: Heather McDonald (maternal half-aunt)
- Birth place: Palmerston North, New Zealand
- Birth date: mid-1920s
- Death date: before 2009

Madge Allsop (born Marjorie Kiri McWhirter) is a fictitious character invented by satirist Barry Humphries as the long-time companion (and former bridesmaid) of his most popular and enduring character, Dame Edna Everage. First mentioned in Edna's monologues in the 1960s, Madge was subsequently depicted on stage, TV and film, over three decades, by several people. The character was discontinued following the retirement of British actress Emily Perry, who played the role for over 15 years.

== Origins of character ==
When Barry Humphries first began to perform as Edna Everage during his one-man shows, the character of Madge Allsop, Edna's bridesmaid and companion, was only ever mentioned in passing and never actually depicted on stage. By the early 1970s, Madge was an increasingly strong presence in Edna's on-stage musings, but still remained unseen. In Barry Humphries' 1971 Australian show, A Load of Old Stuffe, her monologue was entitled "Edna and Madge Allsop in Stratford", while a later one, performed in the 1974 show At least you can say you have seen it, was entitled "Polish up your Kiwi (with Madge Allsop)".

In 1976, Humphries decided to finally bring Madge Allsop to life with an appearance in his new BBC TV series, The Barry Humphries Show. She was portrayed by the London-based expatriate Australian actress Madeleine Orr, who appeared as Madge on several subsequent occasions until her death three years later. Over a period of almost thirty years, from 1976 until 2003, the adult Madge Allsop was portrayed by at least six different people:

- 1976–79 – Madeleine Orr
- 1982 – Unidentified actress/model, in the book Dame Edna's Bedside Companion
- 1987 – Connie Hobbs (in the film Les Patterson saves the world)
- 1987–2003 – Emily Perry (on stage and TV)
- 1989 – Anne Charleston (as a joke, on one episode of The Dame Edna Experience)
- 1998 – Kerris Peeling (who portrayed Madge as a young woman in the stage show Dame Edna: The Spectacle)

When Dame Edna appeared on Desert Island Discs in July 1988, she was permitted to take Madge Allsop to the desert island as her luxury, assuring Sue Lawley that Allsop was an "inanimate object".

== Appearances ==
=== Film and television ===
Madge Allsop was first portrayed on television in 1976, when she appeared (played by actress Madeleine Orr) in an episode of the BBC series The Barry Humphries Show. Following Orr's death in 1979, the role of Madge was re-cast. She appeared alongside Dame Edna on the BBC Parkinson show in 1982, with her face covered in bandages. The character was written into Humphries' 1987 film, Les Patterson Saves the World, and was portrayed, as a one-off appearance, by Australian actress Connie Hobbs. Later that same year, Humphries announced his search for "definitive Madge", who would appear alongside Edna in his new ITV series, The Dame Edna Experience. Of the audition, Humphries recalled, "all of them tried too hard. Some were whimsical, some camp, but most were far too over the top to resemble an oppressed, inarticulate New Zealand spinster whom life had passed by." However, after they saw Emily Perry's understated performance, they knew that they had found the perfect Madge. As she later recalled, "I did nothing at the audition, and I've done nothing ever since."

Emily Perry's appearance on the Dame Edna Experience was well-received; she subsequently became the definitive Madge Allsop, reprising the role in many of Humphries' other TV specials, including One more Audience with Dame Edna Everage (1988), A Night on Mount Edna (1990), Dame Edna's Neighbourhood Watch (1992), Dame Edna's Hollywood (1993) and Dame Edna's Work Experience (1996). Perry's last on-screen appearance as Madge Allsop was a cameo in the TV special Dame Edna lives at the Palace (2003), in which the then 97-year-old actress was 'caught' in bed with Ozzy Osbourne.

Emily Perry became so strongly identified with the character of Madge Allsop that, after her retirement in 2004, the character of Madge was also retired, as it was felt that no other actress could ever recreate her. When Humphries embarked upon a new TV talk show in 2007, The Dame Edna Treatment, the role of Dame Edna's silent scapegoat was filled by an actress portraying her errant (and hitherto unseen) daughter, Valmai Gittis.

Dame Edna (belatedly) publicly acknowledged the death of Madge in her 2019 TV special Dame Edna Rules The Waves, first broadcast on BBC1, December 31, 2019. During the show, Dame Edna attempts to dispose of Madge's ashes from the porthole of her luxury yacht, The Ocean Widow, but is prevented from doing so to protect the environment. Madge's last will and testament insisted that Dame Edna took on the care of her sister Mabel, who was Dame Edna's silent sidekick, sticking labels on her celebrity guests for this one-off programme. Mabel was portrayed by British actress Anne Rason.

=== In Print ===
Madge Allsop has been referenced in a number of books written by Barry Humphries since the mid-1970s. Photographs of Madge (as portrayed by Madeleine Orr) appeared in Dame Edna's Coffee Table Book (1976) and The Sound of Edna: Dame Edna's Family Songbook (1979). Because of Orr's death from cancer that same year, Madge was subsequently portrayed in Humphries' next book, Dame Edna's Beside Companion (1982), by an unidentified stand-in, whose entire head was concealed by bandages. For the purposes of the narrative, this was explained away by the claim that "Madge" had recently undergone cosmetic surgery.

The character of Madge Allsop figured prominently in the book My Gorgeous Life (1989), which, although written by Humphries, was purported to be an autobiography of Dame Edna herself. The book provides much background to Madge and Edna's ongoing friendship, and includes a detailed account of the death of Madge's husband, Douglas Allsop, whilst on their honeymoon in Rotorua. In the line drawings that illustrate the book (drawn by John Richardson), the young Madge is depicted as a recognizable caricature of Emily Perry.

Since the 1980s, theatre programmes for Barry Humphries' one-man shows have frequently included photographs of Madge Allsop (as portrayed by Emily Perry) alongside those of Dame Edna and Sir Les Patterson. For example, the glossy souvenir programme for Humphries' Australian tour, Dame Edna: Back to my roots and other suckers included depictions of Madge in her pink frilly “Edna Loves Me” apron, dancing with Dame Edna while wearing a Vivienne Westwood outfit, shopping with Dame Edna in an exclusive boutique, posing mournfully along Errol Flynn's star on the Hollywood Walk of Fame, and being attacked by a giant prop shark in Edna's swimming pool.

=== On Stage ===
Madge Allsop's most notable appearance on stage was as part of the 1998 West End production of Dame Edna: the Spectacle. The First Act of this show was essentially a retelling of Dame Edna's life story in the form of a lavish stage musical, and Madge Allsop was portrayed as a young woman by Kerris Peeling and as a child by either (depending on the performance) Keely Fawcett, Caroline Graham or Gabrielle Hoffman. Emily Perry, by then 90 years old, also appeared briefly as the present-day Madge.

== Fictional biography ==
=== Early life ===
According to Dame Edna's autobiography, Madge Allsop was born Marjorie Kiri McWhirter in Palmerston North, New Zealand. Her date of birth has not been confirmed, although the fact that she was reportedly orphaned in 1931 "at a young age", as a result of the Napier earthquake, implies that she was born in the mid-1920s (and is, therefore, about the same age as Dame Edna herself). Madge then lived with an aunt until the age of ten, when she moved to Melbourne, Australia. It was while attending Moonee Ponds Girls' Grammar School that she met young Edna Mae Beazley, who took pity on her and became a reluctant friend. It is recorded that the young Madge's cardigan, before it was burnt in the school incinerator, yielded some seeds that took root in the school grounds and produced Australia's first kiwi fruit tree.

In 1951, when Edna married Norm Everage, she chose Madge as one of her four bridesmaids—Madge caught Edna's bouquet "on the back of her neck". When Edna was pregnant with her first child, Madge returned to New Zealand to live with her mother's half-sister, Heather McDonald. In her memoirs, Edna described going down to Melbourne's Station Pier to see her off: “I was naturally very sweet and affectionate to her, since I never expected to see her again”. Some years later, as Edna was planning her first trip to London, she received an invitation to act as Matron of Honour at Madge's wedding to Douglas Hugh Allsop, who ran a tourist bus company in Palmerston North. Edna attended the ceremony in Auckland and, at Madge's request, accompanied the couple on their honeymoon to Rotorua. Douglas Allsop, however, was killed when, while visiting the famous hot mud pools, he leant too far over the railing and fell in. The widowed Madge subsequently returned to Australia with Edna, who "took full responsibility for the life and well-being of her sadly sticken school friend, even charitably incorporating her into some of her theatrrical and television events".

=== Personal life ===
There is considerable evidence that Madge Allsop is a lesbian, or at least bisexual. Dame Edna's son, Kenny, has made this suggestion at least twice; it is noted, for example, in the lyrics to the 1978 song “My Bridesmaid and I”, in which Edna sings, “Kenny thinks that she's bi...”. His claims were re-iterated in Dame Edna's autobiography, My Gorgeous Life, when she recalled Kenny's Coming Out, and, after misunderstanding her response, his assumption that she and Madge were also an item. Kenny's sister, Valmai Gittis, makes a similar claim about their mother's relationship with Madge in an unpublished memoir, Edna Dearest, excerpts of which were reproduced in the 1982 book, Dame Edna's Bedside Companion. A photograph, published in the same source, shows Madge Allsop watching adult videos with titles such as Sapphic Traffic, Loins of Lesbos and Kinky Konvent Kapers. It is also revealed that Edna and Madge have been known to share a bed, although, by Edna's account, this is entirely platonic.

=== Later years ===
In 1982, Madge Allsop underwent what was described as “some radical naso-labial corrective therapy”, which necessitated her entire head being encased with bandages. Towards the end of that decade, she underwent a radical facelift under Dr Christiaan Barnard, which made her resemble Australian actress Anne Charleston. The operation, however, was subsequently reversed.
