= Madeleine Orr =

Australian-British actress (1914–1979)

- Born: Madeleine Grace Orr; 1914; North Melbourne, Victoria, Australia
- Died: 29 June 1979 (aged 64–65); London, England
- Education: University of Melbourne
- Occupation: Actress
- Years active: 1937–1979
- Spouse: John Hearle (m. 1953)
- Parent(s): Charles Hugh-Orr; Madeleine Walsh

Madeleine Grace Orr (31 July 1914 – 29 June 1979) was an Australian-born film, stage and TV actress who worked for many years in London. She is best known as the first person to portray Madge Allsop, bridesmaid and companion to Barry Humphries' most popular and enduring comic character, Dame Edna Everage.

== Early life ==
Born in North Melbourne in 1914, Madeleine Grace Orr was the daughter of Charles Hugh Orr (1883–1932) and his wife Madeleine, nee Walsh, (1888–1961). Charles Orr was a caterer and hotelkeeper by profession, and he and his wife ran a succession of inner city hotels in the early twentieth century including the City Court Hotel and Tattersall's Hotel, both in Russell Street, Melbourne. After Charles' death in 1932, his widow continued as licensee of the latter hotel for some years thence.

During the 1930s, Charles and Madeleine's like-named daughter maintained a high profile in Melbourne's social circles, with her name often recorded in the women's column of the daily newspapers as a guest at parties, balls and dances. The younger Madeleine Orr was reported present, for example, at a 1934 junior auxiliary dance for the District Nurses' Society, a 1935 charity ball aboard the troopship Duntroon and a 1937 German-themed beer garden party. Such connections inevitably gained her entree into Melbourne's theatrical community. In 1935, Orr was noted as one of several young women who sold programmes and sweets at a special fundraising performance that was held at Her Majesty's Theatre.

== Professional life ==
Madeleine Orr started her professional career as a singer, but soon moved into radio productions and repertory and commercial theatre. Her earliest recorded stage appearances, dating back to 1937, included a production of J. B. Priestley's Duet in Floodlight at the Tivoli Theatre and in a one act-play, Pedlar's Progress, at the Melbourne Little Theatre. In the early 1940s, she was a cast member of two radio serials, Bright Horizons and Golden Sanctuaries, produced by 2CH in Sydney. She went on to appear in the Melbourne season of Doris Fitton's Dark of the Moon, "an unusual folk play with music", which opened at the Comedy Theatre in 1952. For many years, Orr was also associated with the St Martin's Theatre, a small independent playhouse in the Melbourne suburb of South Yarra. She appeared there in productions of several Australian plays including The Tower by Hal Porter (1964) and The Jabberwock (1966) by Patricia Napper, as well as the Australian premiere of The Physicists (1964) by Swiss playwright Friedrich Dürrenmatt.

Like many Australian actors of her generation, Orr intended to travel to the United Kingdom to further her professional experience and, after several proposed but postponed trips, finally arrived in early 1965 She spent more than seven months in London, living with Australian-born opera singer Sylvia Fisher and her husband Ubaldo Gardini in their Bayswater home. During that time, Orr was briefly employed by the BBC and appeared in the television play Verdict. Otherwise, she spent much of her time attending West End shows, including productions of Ivanov (with John Gielgud) and Oh Dad, Poor Dad, Mamma's Hung You in the Closet and I'm Feelin' So Sad (with Hermione Gingold). She also attended a controversial "late night show" performed by Elizabeth Seal and her husband Zach Matalon, which closed after that one performance. On her return to Melbourne in December 1965, Orr informed the local press that "I was disappointed by the general standard of theatre in London's West End".

Orr's next major role was in the Australian premiere of the stage musical Robert and Elizabeth, which opened at the Princess Theatre, Melbourne, on 21 May 1966, and ran for six months. She reprised her role in the subsequent Sydney production, which was not as successful; it opened on 19 November 1966, but closed less than four weeks later. Orr remained in Sydney for two weeks' rest, returning to Melbourne in January 1967. Her next appearance on the musical stage was in an original Australian show entitled Razza-ma-tazz (and all that Jazz), co-written by John-Michael Howson, which was produced at the Southland Theatre in 1968.

In a 1966 theatre programme biography, Orr was also described "a composer of popular ballads", whose compositions had been used on many occasions by the Australian Broadcasting Corporation.

During the 1960s, she also appeared on a number of Australian television series including Homicide, and Division 4. In 1968, she appeared in a pilot for a new TV series entitled Once upon a Twilight, which, inspired by the popularity of The Monkees, was to depict the semi-fictitious adventures of a real-life local band, The Twilights. Despite much publicity in the local music paper, Go-Set, the series was cancelled after its principal sponsor, Ford Motor Company, withdrew its backing.

Orr subsequently performed in a new production of Shakespeare's All's Well that Ends Well, directed by Sir Tyrone Guthrie, which opened at Melbourne's Princess Theatre. On 21 October 1970, for a limited three-week season.

By the early 1970s, Madeline Orr had settled permanently in London, where she appeared in two episodes of Crossroads (1973) and the TV mini-series adaptation of David Copperfield (1974). She then performed the role of Mrs McFudd in the West End revival of the stage musical Irene (1976). The latter show included, in the title role, fellow Australian actress Julie Anthony, who had won acclaim in the 1974 Australian production of the same show. Although Orr had not appeared in that production, her role of Mrs McFudd was played by Australian actress Connie Hobbs, who, ironically, would take over the role of Madge Allsop after Orr's death in 1979.

Madeleine Orr first appeared as Dame Edna Everage's long-suffering bridesmaid and companion in the BBC TV series The Barry Humphries Show (1976). Several photographs of Orr, in character as Madge, were subsequently included in Humphries' book, Dame Edna's Coffee Table Book, which was published in London later that year. In June 1978, Orr returned to Australia to help Humphries publicise his latest LP release, The Sound of Edna. At the record launch, Orr (again in the guise of Madge Allsop) arrived in the back of a panel van and then recited a poem that was purportedly written for the occasion by Dame Edna herself. As Madge explained to the press, "Dame Edna wrote it because I'm a bit of an idiot". A newspaper article describing the event was accompanied by a photograph of Dame Edna (in her punk outfit) with bridesmaid Madge, both straddling a huge motorcycle. One of the songs on the album, titled "My Bridesmaid and I", was dedicated to Madge Allsop; a photograph of Orr, in character, was subsequently included in Humphries' accompanying publication The Sound of Edna: Dame Edna's Family Songbook (1979)

Madeleine Orr then returned to London, where, in her last TV appearance before her death, she played Mrs Hemmings in a 1979 episode of the Arthur Lowe vehicle Potter.

== Personal life ==
In September 1952, Madeleine Orr announced her engagement to John Reed Hearle of Elwood.

Orr died of cancer in London on 29 June 1979. A portion of her estate was bequeathed to the University of Melbourne for the establishment of a scholarship in her memory. The Madeleine Orr Scholarship, which is still awarded annually, is open to full-time students of the Faculty of Music enrolled in a degree course for pianoforte.

== Select appearances ==
=== Stage plays and musicals ===
- Duet in Floodlight (Melbourne, 1937)
- Pedlar's progress (Melbourne, 1937)
- Dark of the Moon (Melbourne, 1952)
- The Tower (Melbourne, 1964) – as "Aunt Hester"
- The Physicists (Melbourne, 1964) – as "Doktor Mathilde von Zahnd"
- The Jabberwock (Melbourne, 1966) – as "Moira Charleton"
- Robert and Elizabeth (Melbourne and Sydney, 1966) – as "Wilson"
- Razza-ma-tazz (and all that Jazz) (Melbourne, 1968)
- All's well that ends well (Melbourne, 1970)
- Irene (London, 1976) – as "Mrs McFudd"

=== Television ===
- Verdict (BBC, 1965)
- Hey, you! (Australia, 1967)
- Good morning, Mrs Doubleday (Australia, 1969)
- Division 4 (Australia, 1969–70)
- Crossroads (ATV, 1973)
- The Barry Humphries Show (BBC, 1976)
- Potter (BBC, 1979)

=== Radio ===
- Bright Horizons (Radio 2CH, 1942)
- Golden Sanctuary (Radio 2CH, 1942)
- David's Children (Radio 3DB, 1952) – as "Eve Hamilton"

=== Film ===
- Stork (1971) – as "Stork's mother"
