= Les Patterson Saves the World =

- DVD cover
- Directed by: George T. Miller
- Written by: Barry Humphries; Diane Millstead
- Produced by: Sue Milliken
- Starring: Barry Humphries; Pamela Stephenson; Joy Westmore; Thaao Penghlis
- Cinematography: David Connell
- Edited by: Tim Wellburn
- Music by: Tim Finn
- Production company: Humpstead Productions
- Distributed by: Hoyts Distribution
- Release date: April 9, 1987 (Australia)
- Running time: 98 minutes
- Country: Australia
- Language: English
- Budget: A$7.3 million
- Box office: A$626,000 (Australia)

Les Patterson Saves the World is a 1987 Australian comedy film starring Barry Humphries as his stage creations Sir Les Patterson and Dame Edna Everage.

== Plot ==
The uncouth Sir Les Patterson teams up with Dame Edna Everage (both played by Barry Humphries) to save the world from a virulent bioterror attack ordered by Colonel Richard Godowni (Thaao Penghlis) of the Gulf State of Abu Niveah.

== Cast ==
- Barry Humphries as Sir Les Patterson / Dame Edna Everage
- Pamela Stephenson as Veronique Crudité
- Thaao Penghlis as Colonel Richard Godowni
- Andrew Clarke as Neville Thonge
- Henri Szeps as Dr. Charles Herpes / Desiree Herpes
- Hugh Keays-Byrne as Inspector Farouk
- Elizabeth McIvor as Nancy Borovansky
- Garth Meade as Mustafa Toul
- Arthur Sherman as General Evans
- John Clarke as Mike Rooke
- Josef Drewniak as Mossolov
- Esben Storm as Russian Scientist
- Joy Westmore as Lady Gwen Patterson
- Connie Hobbs as Madge Allsop
- Joan Rivers as the U.S. President

== Production ==
The film was co-written by Humphries with his third wife Diane Millstead, and directed by George Miller of The Man from Snowy River fame.

The film was originally meant to be made by Thorn EMI in Britain but was eventually established in Australia with entirely Australian money.

Filming began 18 August 1986.

== Box office ==
Les Patterson Saves the World grossed $626,000 at the box office in Australia. "It was a disaster of major proportions", said Jonathan Chissick of Hoyts, who distributed the film in Australia. David Stratton wrote in 1990, "The gala opening was an embarrassing occasion, and it is still rumoured in the industry today that the Federal Treasurer Paul Keating, who attended, was so angry that he decide to end rorts in the film industry."

The movie was released to British cinemas in 1988 but was not successful there either.

== Critical reception ==
Australian film critic Michael Adams later included Les Patterson Saves the World on his list of the worst ever Australian films, along with Phantom Gold, The Glenrowan Affair, Houseboat Horror, Welcome to Woop Woop, The Pirate Movie and Pandemonium.

Filmink argued the film "would have been successful – had it been grounded in some kind of reality" but it "add a pure movie-movie plot... a riff on spy movies, complete with fictitious Arabian countries recreated on the backlot a la some racist British comedy of the 1950s. Edna had left the land of verisimilitude to morph into more of a showbiz in-joke – which was admittedly still funny and worked a treat on stage and television, but not on film, as she didn’t have Barry McKenzie as an anchor. Instead, the film was driven by Sir Les Patterson, who was an even broader figure than Edna."

== See also ==
- Cinema of Australia
