= Garth Meade =

Australian actor and comedian

- Born: 1925; Johannesburg, South Africa
- Died: 2002 (aged 77); Sydney, Australia
- Occupations: Actor, comedian
- Spouse: Elaine Lee

Garth Meade (born 1925, Johannesburg, South Africa, died 2002 Sydney) was a South African and later Australian actor and comedian, best known for his roles on television series and mini-series. He also worked numerously in cabaret and the club circuit.

== Biography ==
Meade, was born in Johannesburg, and studied classical guitar, at the Guildhall School of Music and Drama in London. He began his performing career touring many major cities in the UK and Ireland. Meade and his wife, actress Elaine Lee, emigrated to Australia in 1970. He wrote and starred in the show High Noon at 8.40 in Sydney. His wife had planned to act solely as housewife upon their move to Australia but soon followed her yearnings and returned to acting. In 1972 she was cast as fashion designer Vera Collins an original cast member of evening soap opera Number 96. The series became a huge hit and Lee's fame quickly eclipsed that of her husband. The marriage ended in 1976. Meade also appeared in Number 96 in later years.

In 1980, Meade was a regular in the new serial Arcade created by several of the creative team who had been behind Number 96. Meade played Norman Pendleton, the owner of the Health Studio in the shopping mall of the title. The series was a major ratings flop cancelled after six weeks on air. Meade also played roles in comedy feature films Les Patterson Saves the World (1987) and The Return of Captain Invincible (1983), and in television miniseries Poor Man's Orange (1987). Meade died on 23 January 2002 at Sydney's St Vincent's Hospital after a short battle with cancer, aged 77. He is survived by his daughter Amanda Meade a journalist at Guardian Australia.

== Filmography ==
=== Films (selected) ===
Title	Year	Role
The Dove	1974	South African Customs Officer
The Return of Captain Invincible	1983	Polish Salesman
Molly	1983	Singing professor
Les Patterson Saves the World	1987	Mustafa Toul

=== Telemovies and serials (selected) ===
Title	Year	Role
This Is the Henry Hall Show (TV series)	1957	2 episodes as himself
Vera Lynn Presents (TV series)	1960	1 episode as himself
Number 96 (TV series)	1977	Manuel (8 episodes)
Arcade (TV series)	1980	Norman Pendleton (35 episodes)
Home Sweet Home (TV series)	1981	Giovannino Macari
Poor Man's Orange (TV miniseries)	1987	The Kidger (Part 1 and Part 2)
The Clean Machine (TV movie)	1988	Imad Hamoudi
