= Maurice Bennett =

New Zealand toast artist (1957–2016)

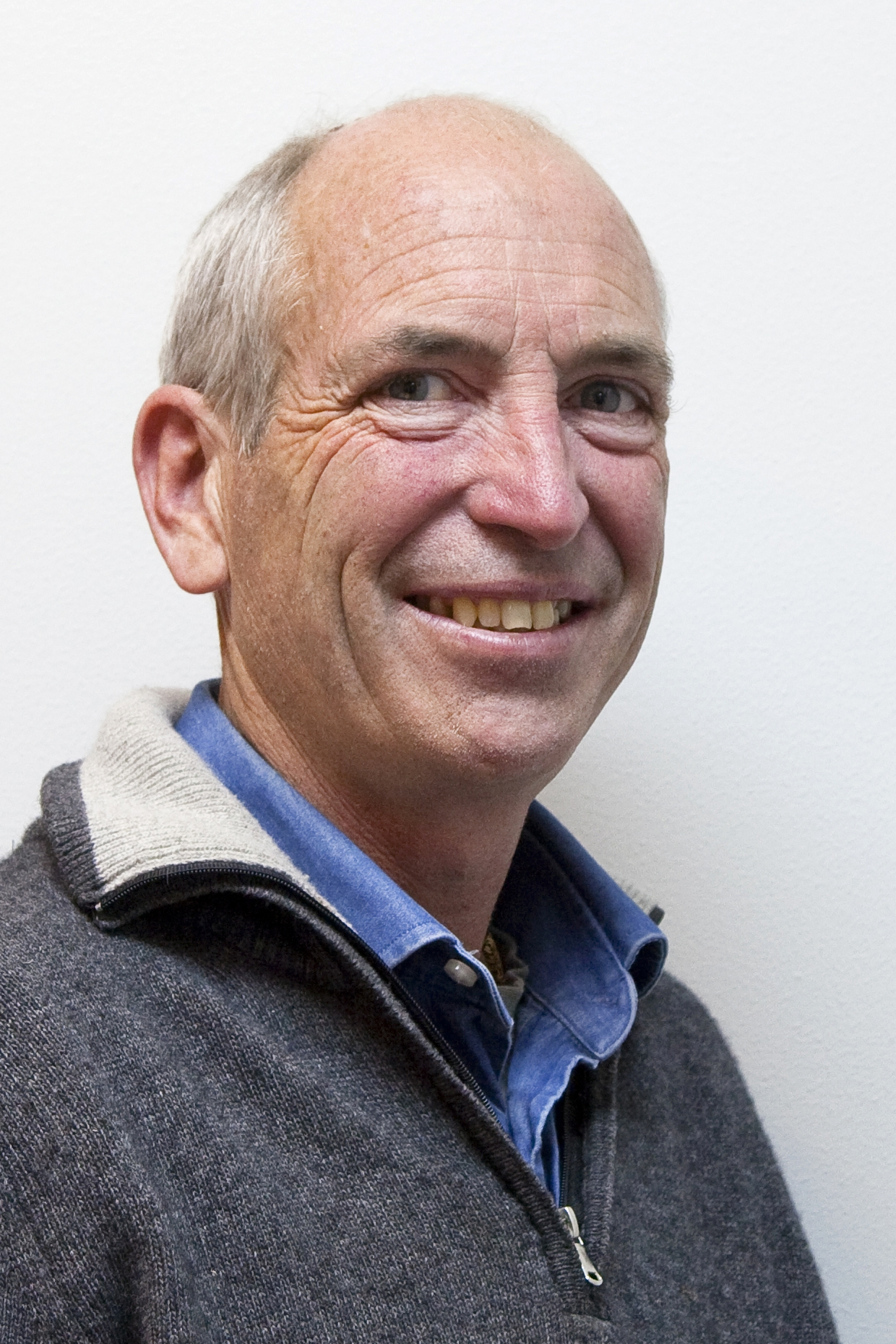
- Bennett, 2010
- Born: 25 April 1957; Paeroa, New Zealand
- Died: 6 June 2016 (aged 59); Wellington, New Zealand
- Known for: Toast mosaic artworks
- Spouse: Carolyn Bennett (m. 1987)
- Children: 2
- Website: Official website at the Wayback Machine (archived 24 January 2023)

Maurice "Toastman" Bennett (25 April 1957 – 6 June 2016) was a New Zealand artist who used toast as an artistic medium. Beginning in 2000, his billboard-sized toast mosaic images of well-known personalities including Marilyn Monroe, Elvis Presley, Jonah Lomu, the Mona Lisa, Dame Edna and Barack Obama, were exhibited widely and received a great deal of media interest in New Zealand and internationally. From 2000 to 2005, he held the world record for the largest toast portrait, and he also held the world record for the largest portrait made out of candy for a portrait of Eminem in M&M's.

Bennett developed cancer in 2000, shortly after he began experimenting with toast artworks, and although given a prognosis of 5 years to live, survived for 16 years. In addition to his artwork he and his wife ran a supermarket and a brewery in Wellington, until he became a full-time artist in 2009. He died at his home in Island Bay, Wellington, at age 59.

== Early life and career ==
Bennett was born on 25 April 1957 in Paeroa, New Zealand. He attended high school in Whakatāne, completed a certificate in civil engineering at Auckland Technical Institute and began (but did not complete) a bachelor of architecture at Auckland University. He married his wife Carolyn in 1987, having met her while working at a supermarket, and they had two daughters. Outside of his artwork, he and his wife ran a New World supermarket in Island Bay, Wellington, and (from 2004) a brewing company, and he became a fulltime artist in 2009. He was a collector of New Zealand ceramics, and curated an exhibition of ceramics called Tectonic Clay at a Wellington gallery in 2014.

Bennett's early artwork was conventional painting, sculpture and installation art. The 1998 New Zealand Fringe Festival featured his exhibition Burning Desire, in which he set fire to a pile of miscellaneous objects and exhibited the remains. He received the festival's "off-the-edge" award for this work. He began working in toast in 1999, experimenting first with a trial 940-slice piece outside his supermarket. He has said he was inspired to make toast artworks during a family barbecue, and after seeing a picture in a magazine by Chuck Close that on first glance looked like it was made out of pieces of toast.

== Toast artworks ==
Bennett created billboard-size images made up of toast in mosaic form. He used computer software to convert photographs into a grid of pixel-like blocks, and would then toast the bread to the correct shade, using either a commercial oven, an oxy-acetylene torch, and even occasionally a household toaster. He preferred the Tip Top brand of bread and usually used white bread although said in 2002 that he was experimenting with multi-grain.

His first large artwork, a 2,724-slice mosaic of former Wellington mayor Mark Blumsky created for the 2000 New Zealand Fringe Festival, was destroyed by weather and seagulls after two days; he subsequently used polyurethane to preserve his artworks. Blumsky said he was impressed with the work but that he felt the eyebrows were "a bit light". It held the world record for the largest toast mosaic until 2005. In 2001 he created a 2,124 slice, 7.2 m (24 ft) tall, portrait of the Mona Lisa, featured on a central Wellington building. In 2002 he spent a month creating a 2,378-slice portrait of rugby player Jonah Lomu, displayed at Wellington's Café Brava. Lomu's manager was unhappy about the image, and said Lomu's image was copyrighted; Bennett said in response that "it would be a very dull world if a person can't go out and make or draw a picture of a person". Lomu's manager subsequently consented to the artwork remaining on display.

In 2002, he was commissioned by an Australian bread company to create a 7.35 m (24.1 ft) tall 2,989-slice toast portrait of Dame Edna, exhibited on a billboard in La Trobe Street in Melbourne. In the same year he also created a 5.76 m^{2} (62.0 sq ft) toast portrait of Elvis Presley to mark the 25th anniversary of his death. The portrait of Presley attracted international media interest, and he was featured on CNN, on the BBC and in Time magazine.

In 2003, he created a 3 m (9.8 ft) square 3,024-slice portrait of then prime minister Helen Clark wearing a fruit bowl for the Edible Arts Festival in Napier. The portrait was vandalised shortly after it was installed, resulting in Bennett agreeing to, as reported by The Dominion Post, "toast a new nose for the portrait". A 2003 article about Bennett's work in tabloid newspaper The Daily Mail was headlined, "Forget the Old Masters such as Remburnt, Pain Gogh and Buttercelli ... Meet Michelangeloaf".

In 2010, he created a 2.4 m (7.9 ft) square 4,234-slice portrait of American president Barack Obama, and a 4,204-slice portrait of New Zealand prime minister John Key. The US ambassador, David Huebner, said he believed it to be the first time Obama had been depicted in toast. His portrait of Eminem out of 5,040 M&M's featured in the Guinness Book of World Records as the largest picture made from candy. His portrait of rugby player Richie McCaw is exhibited at the New Zealand Rugby Museum in Palmerston North. Bennett's other toast portrait subjects included Marilyn Monroe, rugby player Gareth Edwards and beer critic Michael Jackson.

His work was featured on television shows including Ripley's Believe It or Not in the United States, Amazing Stories in Japan, and Holmes and Campbell Live in New Zealand. It has been exhibited internationally including in Shanghai, Hong Kong and Tokyo.

== Later life and death ==
In later years, Bennett began creating collage works in addition to portraits, including works inspired by Māori carvings and traditional designs. He noted that he found interpreting indigenous art to be more of a challenge than portrait works.

Bennett was diagnosed with chronic lymphoid leukemia in 2000 and given an estimated 5 years to live. In 2014 he donated a toast artwork titled Care, Hope and Love to the cancer ward at Wellington Hospital, following an exhibition at Wellington's Deluxe Café. He died from his illness on 6 June 2016 at his home in Island Bay, Wellington, with his wife by his side. A memorial service was held at St Mark's Church in Carterton, where Bennett had designed a stained glass window.

== Selected exhibitions ==
- 2014: Hope on Toast, Deluxe Café, Wellington.
- 2011: The Five Greatest Rugby Players of All Time, part of the A Game of Two Halves exhibition at the New Zealand Academy of Fine Arts, Wellington.
- 2011: Portrait of Marilyn Monroe, Xintiandi, Shanghai.
- 2010: Toast Art Picasso, K11 Art Mall, Hong Kong.
- 2009: Just Toasted, South Coast Gallery, Wellington.
- 2006: The Toastman, South Coast Gallery, Wellington.
- 2002: Toast Art, Café Brava, Wellington.
- 2001: Toast @ Toast, Toast Bistro Gallery, Wellington.
- 2000: Portrait of Mark Blumsky, New Zealand Fringe Festival, Wellington.
- 1998: Burning Desire, New Zealand Fringe Festival, Wellington.
