= Emily Perry (English actress) =

English actress (1907–2008)

- Emily Perry in character as Madge Allsop
- Born: Patricia Emily Perry; 28 June 1907; Torquay, Devon, England
- Died: 19 February 2008 (aged 100); Twickenham, London, England
- Occupation: Actress
- Years active: 1910s–2004

Patricia Emily Perry (28 June 1907 – 19 February 2008) was an English actress and dancer. Born in Torquay, Devon, she was best known for her recurring role as Madge Allsop, Dame Edna Everage's long-suffering, silent "bridesmaid" from Palmerston North, New Zealand.

== Early life and career ==
According to one obituary, Perry first appeared on stage at the Theatre Royal, Birmingham, at the age of four. Her father, who was an accountant, was reportedly shocked by her desire to become an actress, although he nevertheless paid her tuition fees at dance school and even permitted her to use the family home for her first audition.

Perry subsequently appeared as a singer, dancer and actress in pantomime and music halls. She played the role of Susan in The Desert Song for twelve years, and also toured in The Student Prince and The Belle of New York. During the Second World War, she performed with ENSA. Around 1960, she founded a children's dancing school, The Patricia Perry Academy of Dancing, based in Crystal Palace in South London, which she ran for twenty-five years before deciding to return to acting in 1984. At that time, there was another actress named Patricia Perry, so she adopted her middle name, Emily, as her stage name.

== Madge Allsop ==
Although the character of Madge Allsop was created by Barry Humphries during the 1960s, she was only mentioned in passing by Dame Edna and did not appear on stage until the late 1970s, when she was portrayed by the London-based Australian actress Madeleine Orr. Orr died of cancer in 1979, so when the role of Madge was written into Humphries' 1987 film Les Patterson Saves the World, she was portrayed by another Australian actress, Connie Hobbs. Later that year, when Humphries decided to cast "the definitive Madge" for his new TV series, The Dame Edna Experience, he auditioned many elderly actresses for what would be a recurring role. As he recalled, "All of them tried too hard. Some were whimsical, some camp, but most were far too over the top to resemble an oppressed, inarticulate New Zealand spinster whom life had passed by." Perry herself later recalled: "I did nothing at the audition, and I've done nothing since." Humphries paid tribute to Perry in the second volume of his autobiography, ascribing her with "the rare gift of being able to do nothing in the face of overwhelming provocation".

Perry's portrayal of Madge Allsop in The Dame Edna Experience was well received, and she subsequently reprised the role in many of Humphries' other TV specials, including One more Audience with Dame Edna Everage (1988), A Night on Mount Edna (1990), Dame Edna's Neighbourhood Watch (1992) and Dame Edna's Hollywood (1993). Madge became something of a cult figure—much to the apparent annoyance of Dame Edna—and appeared in a coffee commercial in the late 1980s.

In 1997, she made a memorable appearance as Madge Allsop on a Comic Relief TV Special, in which she danced and sang "Today I Feel So Happy". She was to have been accompanied on the piano by Andrew Lloyd Webber but, as he did not know the music, a member of the audience was conscripted instead, with Webber turning the pages of the sheet music. This brief performance, which represented the only time Madge Allsop spoke on camera, received a huge ovation from the studio audience. Perry's last on-screen appearance as Madge Allsop was a cameo in the TV special Dame Edna: Live at the Palace (2003), in which the then-96-year-old actress was 'caught' in bed with Ozzy Osbourne.

== Other appearances ==
As an actress in her own right, her filmography is limited to her appearances with Dame Edna, except for a 1995 appearance on an episode of Last of the Summer Wine as "Mrs. Broadbent". She appeared as herself in Night of a Thousand Faces (2001).

== Later life and death ==
Perry retired in 2004 and took up residence in Brinsworth House, Twickenham, where she died on 19 February 2008, aged 100.
