= Barry McKenzie =

Fictional character

- First appearance: 1964
- Created by: Barry Humphries
- Portrayed by: Barry Crocker

In-universe information
- Full name: Barrington Bradman Bing McKenzie
- Family: Aunty Edna Everage
- Nationality: Australian

Barrington Bradman Bing "Barry" McKenzie is a fictional character created in 1964 by the Australian comedian Barry Humphries, suggested by Peter Cook, for a comic strip, written by Humphries and drawn by New Zealand artist Nicholas Garland in the British satirical magazine Private Eye. He was subsequently featured in theatre and in two films in the 1970s, and portrayed by Australian singer Barry Crocker.

== Background ==
One of Humphries' early stage characters was a surfer named "Buster Thompson", who served as a prototype for Barry McKenzie. Humphries has noted that after Peter Cook heard a recording of Thompson in New York in 1962, he invited him to devise a similar character for Private Eye.

The comic strip about a "randy, boozy Australian rampaging through Swinging London" was very popular, but Eye editor Richard Ingrams eventually dropped it on account of Humphries’ drinking and missing deadlines (Ingrams gave up alcohol in the 1960s, as did Humphries in the 1970s). Ingrams said that "Humphries was at that stage a serious alcoholic".

== Books ==
The Private Eye comic strips were compiled into three books, The Wonderful World of Barry McKenzie (1968), in which McKenzie travels to Britain to claim his inheritance, followed by Bazza Pulls It Off! (1971), and later, Bazza Comes Into His Own: The Final Fescennine Farago of Barry McKenzie, Australia's First Working-Class Hero—With Learned and Scholarly Appendices and a New Enlarged Glossary (1979). The first two books were published in London and initially banned in Australia with the Minister for Customs and Excise stating the comic "relied on indecency for its humour". The three books and unpublished strips were compiled for The Complete Barry McKenzie: Not so Much a Legendary Strip, More a Resonant Social History Per Se, which was published in 1988 and featured a preface by Sir Les Patterson.

== Films ==
In 1972, the film The Adventures of Barry McKenzie was released, based on the first published book. In 1974, a sequel, Barry McKenzie Holds His Own, was made. The films starred Barry Crocker as McKenzie, and chronicled the character's adventures in Britain and France respectively. In the films, McKenzie is the nephew of another of Humphries' characters, Edna Everage. Despite the banning of The Wonderful World of Barry McKenzie in Australia, the films received considerable support from the Australian government of John Gorton, becoming the first to receive funding from the Australian Film Development Commission. Australian Prime Minister Gough Whitlam appeared in Barry McKenzie Holds His Own, granting a damehood to McKenzie's aunt, Edna Everage.

== Character ==
The character was a parody of the boorish Australian overseas, particularly those residing in Britain – ignorant, loud, crude, drunk, and pugnacious – although McKenzie also proved popular with Australians because he embodied some of their positive characteristics: he was friendly, forthright, and straightforward with his British hosts, who themselves were often portrayed as stereotypes of pompous, arrogant, devious colonialists.

Men at Work lead singer Colin Hay said that the lyrics for "Down Under" were inspired by the Barry McKenzie character.
