= Dame Edna's Neighbourhood Watch =

1992–1993 British comedy TV series

- Created by: Barry Humphries and Ian Davidson
- Presented by: Dame Edna
- Starring: Emily Perry
- Country of origin: United Kingdom
- Original language: English
- No. of series: 2
- No. of episodes: 12

Production
- Running time: 30mins (inc. adverts)
- Production company: LWT

Original release
- Network: ITV
- Release: 19 September 1992 – 23 October 1993

Dame Edna's Neighbourhood Watch is a British comic game show created by Barry Humphries for ITV. It was televised on Saturday nights.

== Game play ==
Hosted by Dame Edna Everage, three members of her "all-female, invitation-only audience" would be randomly chosen to play a quiz game for prizes. (Prizes included a Ferrari, jewellery, and a box of chocolates with all the soft-centres removed, as well as work-out sessions with Edna's own "personal trainer", the hunky Roberto Bulges [pronounced "Bul-JESS"].) However, after selecting the lucky three contestants with her "heat-seeking gladiolus", which she also calls her "purple possum pickers" ("possums" being her affectionate nickname for her female guests), those chosen would be sent off to be "made up and microphoned" by Sister (nurse) Vedgegood, while Dame Edna explained the show to the remaining audience: a camera crew has been dispatched to the home of one of the three "randomly selected" contestants, and the quiz will be about the contents of their house.

Once the three contestants have returned and have their buzzers, the quiz begins. The initial questions are easy, showing famous residences, such as the White House or Buckingham Palace, with Dame Edna asking the question "Who lives here?", but the third question would always be accompanied by pictures from the remote camera crew. Naturally, two of the contestants would be stumped, but the third, after recognising her own home, would be dragged up by Edna and turned into "a consultant".

The show then began in earnest. The camera crew, accompanied by Edna's bridesmaid Madge Allsop, enter the contestant's home, and begin rifling through her things. Their discoveries—such as discarded underwear, nude photographs, hidden liquor supplies and lovers' trysts—would provoke shrieks of hilarity from the studio audience and red-faced embarrassment from the unfortunate contestant.

The other two contestants would then be quizzed about what they had just seen. Some of the questions were actually quite difficult, and inquired about minute details. Others were much simpler: "Dot has wall-to-wall carpeting. Is this tasteless?"

In the end, neither contestant would win nearly enough points to collect anything except the chocolates, but the contestant and her husband (who had provided access to the house in the first place) would be given a fancy, all-expenses paid holiday. In the first series, they are also presented with a bouquet of gladioli and a commemorative plate bearing a cartoon-like drawing of Dame Edna.

Both series were recorded in 1992, before the first series aired, thus preserving the element of surprise in the second series.

== Transmissions ==
Series	Start date	End date	Episodes
1	19 September 1992	24 October 1992	6
2	18 September 1993	23 October 1993	6
