= Sandy Stone (character) =

Fictional persona invention of Barry Humphries

- First appearance: "Sandy Stone's Big Week" 1958
- Created by: Barry Humphries
- Portrayed by: Barry Humphries

Sandy Stone was a male character played by the Australian comedian Barry Humphries. Described by John Betjeman as "this decent man from the suburbs", Stone is one of Humphries' more enduring characters.

== History of character ==
The inspiration for Sandy came from a neighbour, a Mr Whittle, whom Humphries knew as a boy, and was portrayed in a short story, Sandy Stone's Big Week, written by Humphries (under the pseudonym H. Grahame) in 1956 but not published until 1958 (in a Canberra student magazine Prometheus). Humphries describes Sandy, originally called Dusty, as an "elderly, childless man" living in the suburbs of Melbourne. His vocal mannerisms came from an aged man Humphries met on Bondi Beach.

One of Sandy's monologues was part of the recording A Nice Night's Entertainment, which was particularly enjoyed by Humphries' friend, Peter Cook. Humphries was still writing monologues for Sandy Stone "Australia’s most boring man". He said in 2016 that "slowly the character has deepened, so I begin to understand and appreciate him, and finally feel myself turning into him". In Humphries' later years, he no longer required makeup for the part, and played Sandy in his own dressing gown.

== Character ==
Sandy's monologues were sometimes inspired by stories recounted to Humphries by friends or family, like the tale of Dot Swift who was handed over to the Twilight Home which may be the very same home, or perhaps a subsidiary of the one Dame Edna's mother resides in. Barry Humphries sometimes used the character to balance pathos with humor or satire; in one monologue having the ghost of Sandy Stone recall his four-year-old daughter who died in the 1930s and how his wife then suffered a breakdown. The Australian columnist Peter Craven commented that Humphries in his Sandy Stone persona could "reduce an audience of young unbelieving cynics to tears with material that might have been written by James Joyce - delivered with wan, uncomprehending wonderment".

In some recent appearances (Shades), Sandy states he never had any children. A specialist had confirmed this and he never ever completed work on dolls' house furniture he had started in his workshop. The planned "nursery" lost its purpose and name.

The character is featured in the track 'Sandy Agonistes' which takes up one side of Humphries' first LP, 1960's Sandy Agonistes. It was later reissued on Moonee Ponds Muse, Vol. 1.

The complete scripts (edited by Collin O'Brien) of all the Stone soliloquies to date were published in The Life and Death of Sandy Stone in 1990.

== Painting ==
The artist Sidney Nolan painted a portrait of the character.
