= Barry Humphries =

Australian comedian (1934–2023)

Barry Humphries AC CBE
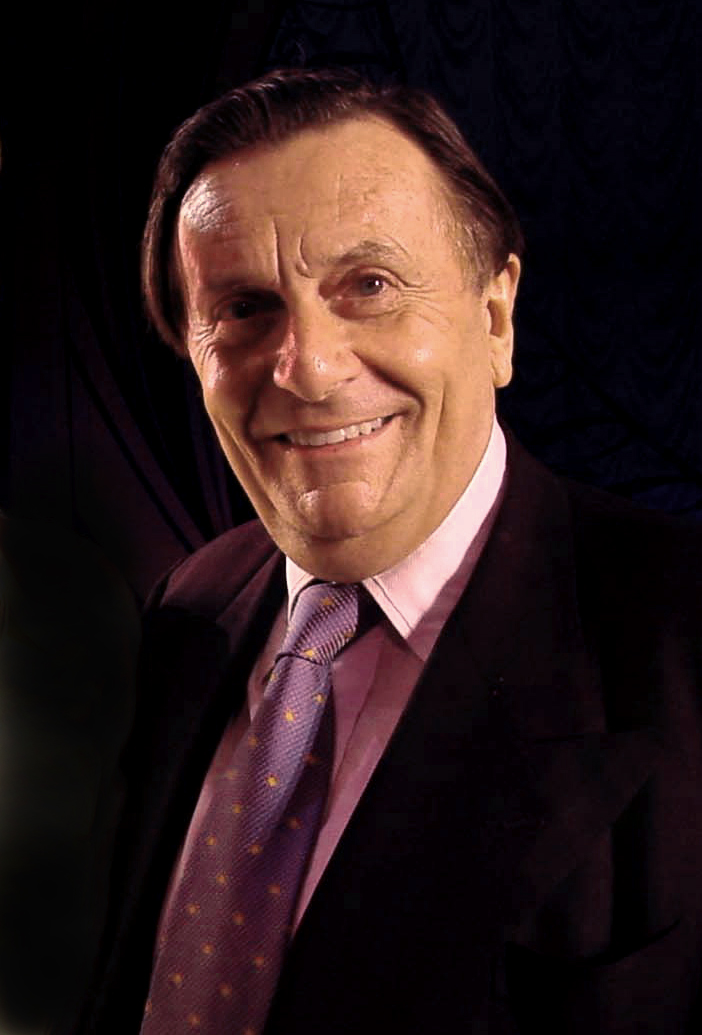
- Humphries in July 2001
- Born: John Barry Humphries; 17 February 1934; Melbourne, Victoria, Australia
- Died: 22 April 2023 (aged 89); Sydney, New South Wales, Australia
- Education: Camberwell Grammar School; Melbourne Grammar School
- Occupations: Actor; author; artist; comedian; satirist
- Years active: 1955–2023
- Spouses: Brenda Wright (m. 1955; div. 1957); Rosalind Tong (m. 1959; div. 1970); Diane Millstead (m. 1979; div. 1989); Elizabeth Spender (m. 1990)
- Children: 4, including Tessa and Oscar
- Notable work: Dame Edna Everage; Sir Les Patterson; Sandy Stone

Comedy career
- Years active: 1951–2023
- Genres: Character comedy; satire

John Barry Humphries AC CBE (17 February 1934 – 22 April 2023) was an Australian comedian, actor, author and satirist. He was best known for writing and playing his stage and television characters Dame Edna Everage and Sir Les Patterson. He appeared in numerous stage productions, films and television shows.

Humphries's characters brought him international renown. Originally conceived as a dowdy Moonee Ponds housewife who caricatured Australian suburban complacency and insularity, the Dame Edna Everage character developed into a satire of stardom: a gaudily dressed, acid-tongued, egomaniacal, internationally fêted "housewife gigastar". His other satirical characters included the "priapic and inebriated cultural attaché" Sir Les Patterson, who "continued to bring worldwide discredit upon Australian arts and culture, while contributing as much to the Australian vernacular as he has borrowed from it"; gentle, grandfatherly "returned gentleman" Sandy Stone; iconoclastic 1960s' underground film-maker Martin Agrippa; Paddington socialist academic Neil Singleton; sleazy trade-union official Lance Boyle; high-pressure art salesman Morrie O'Connor; failed tycoon Owen Steele; and archetypal Australian bloke Barry McKenzie.

== Early life ==
Humphries was born on 17 February 1934 in the suburb of Kew in Melbourne, Victoria, the son of Eric Humphries (né John Albert Eric Humphries) (1905–1972), a construction manager, and his wife Louisa Agnes (née Brown) (1907–1984). His grandfather John George Humphries was an emigrant to Australia from Manchester, England, in the late 1800s. His father was well-to-do, and Barry grew up in a "clean, tasteful, and modern suburban home" on Christowel Street, Camberwell, then one of Melbourne's new "garden suburbs". His early home life set the pattern for his eventual stage career; his father in particular spent little time with him, and Humphries spent hours playing at dressing-up in the back garden.

Disguising myself as different characters and I had a whole box of dressing up clothes ... Red Indian, sailor suit, Chinese costume and I was very spoiled in that way ... I also found that entertaining people gave me a great feeling of release, making people laugh was a very good way of befriending them. People couldn't hit you if they were laughing.

His parents nicknamed him "Sunny Sam", and his early childhood was happy and uneventful. However, in his teens, Humphries began to rebel against the strictures of conventional suburban life by becoming "artistic", much to the dismay of his parents, who, despite their affluence, distrusted "art". A key event took place when he was nine – his mother gave all of his books to the Salvation Army, cheerfully explaining: "But you've read them, Barry." Humphries responded by becoming a voracious reader, a collector of rare books, a painter, a theatre fan and a surrealist. Dressing in a black cloak, black homburg hat and mascaraed eyes, he invented his first sustained character, "Dr Aaron Azimuth", agent provocateur, dandy and Dadaist.

=== Education ===
Educated first at Camberwell Grammar School, Humphries was awarded a place in the school's gallery of achievement. As his father's building business prospered, Humphries was sent to Melbourne Grammar School, where he spurned sport, detested mathematics, shirked cadets "on the basis of conscientious objection" and matriculated with strong results in English and art. Humphries described this schooling, in a Who's Who entry, as "self-educated, attended Melbourne Grammar School".

Humphries spent two years studying at the University of Melbourne, where he studied law, philosophy and fine arts. During this time, he was a private in the Melbourne University Regiment, serving a period of national service in the Citizens Military Force of the Australian Army. He did not graduate from university (although he would receive an honorary doctorate almost 50 years later). During this time he became a follower of the deconstructive and absurdist art movement, Dada.

The Dadaist pranks and performances that he mounted in Melbourne were experiments in anarchy and visual satire that have become part of Australian folklore. An exhibit entitled "Pus in Boots" consisted of a pair of Wellington boots filled with custard; a mock pesticide product called "Platytox" claimed on its box to be effective against the platypus, a beloved and protected species in Australia. He was part of a group that made a series of Dada-influenced recordings in Melbourne from 1952 to 1953. "Wubbo Music" (Humphries said that "wubbo" is a pseudo-Aboriginal word meaning "nothing") is thought to be one of the earliest recordings of experimental music in Australia. Other exhibits the group mounted include "Creche Bang", a pram covered in meat and "Eye and Spoon Race", a spoon with a sheep's eye.

== Career ==
=== Early career in Australia ===
Humphries had written and performed songs and sketches in university revues, so after leaving university he joined the newly formed Melbourne Theatre Company (MTC). It was at this point that he created the first incarnation of what became his best-known character, Edna Everage. The first stage sketch to feature Mrs. Norm Everage, called "Olympic Hostess", premiered at Melbourne University's Union Theatre on 13 December 1955.

In his award-winning autobiography, More Please (1992), Humphries related that he had created a character similar to Edna in the back of a bus while touring Victoria with Twelfth Night with the MTC at the age of 20. He credited his then mentor, Peter O'Shaughnessy, stating that, without his "nurturing and promotion, the character of Edna Everage would have been nipped in the bud after 1956 and never come to flower, while the character of Sandy Stone would never have taken shape as a presence on the stage".

In 1957, Humphries moved to Sydney and joined Sydney's Phillip Street Theatre, which became Australia's leading venue for revue and satirical comedy over the next decade. His first appearance at Phillip Street was in the satirical revue Two to One, starring veteran Australian musical star Max Oldaker, with a cast including Humphries and future Number 96 star Wendy Blacklock. Although he had originally assumed Edna's debut Melbourne appearance would be a one-off, Humphries decided to revive "Olympic Hostess" for Phillip Street and its success helped to launch what became a fifty-year career for the self-proclaimed "Housewife Superstar" (later Megastar, then Gigastar).

The next Phillip Street revue was Around the Loop, which again teamed Oldaker, Gordon Chater, Blacklock and Humphries, plus newcomer June Salter. Humphries revived the Edna character (for what he said would be the last time) and the revue proved to be a major hit, playing eight shows a week for 14 months. During this period Humphries was living near Bondi and while out walking one day he had a chance meeting with an elderly man who had a high, scratchy voice and a pedantic manner of speech; this encounter inspired the creation of another of Humphries's most enduring characters, Sandy Stone.

In September 1957, Humphries appeared as Estragon in Waiting for Godot, in Australia's first production of the Samuel Beckett play at the Arrow Theatre in Melbourne directed by Peter O'Shaughnessy who played Vladimir.

In 1958, Humphries and O'Shaughnessy collaborated on and appeared in the Rock'n'Reel Revue at the New Theatre in Melbourne, where Humphries brought the characters of Mrs Everage and Sandy Stone into the psyche of Melbourne audiences. In the same year, Humphries made his first commercial recording, the EP Wild Life in Suburbia, which featured liner notes by his friend, the Modernist architect and writer Robin Boyd.

=== London and the 1960s ===
In 1959, Humphries moved to London, where he lived and worked throughout the 1960s. He became a friend of leading members of the British comedy scene including Dudley Moore, Peter Cook, Alan Bennett, Jonathan Miller, Spike Milligan, Willie Rushton and fellow Australian expatriate comedian-actors John Bluthal and Dick Bentley. Humphries performed at Cook's comedy venue The Establishment, where he became a friend of and was photographed by leading photographer Lewis Morley, whose studio was located above the club.

Humphries contributed to the satirical magazine Private Eye, of which Cook was publisher, his best-known work being the cartoon strip The Wonderful World of Barry McKenzie. The bawdy cartoon satire of the worst aspects of Australians abroad was written by Humphries and drawn by New Zealand-born cartoonist Nicholas Garland. The book version of the comic strip, published in the late 1960s, was for some time banned by the Australian government because it "relied on indecency for its humour".

Humphries appeared in numerous West End stage productions including the musicals Oliver! and Maggie May, by Lionel Bart, and in stage and radio productions by his friend Spike Milligan. At one time, he was invited to play the leading role of Captain Martin Bules in The Bedsitting Room, which had already opened successfully at the Mermaid Theatre and was transferring to the West End. Humphries performed with Milligan in the 1968 production of Treasure Island in the role of Long John Silver. He described working with Milligan as "one of the strangest and most exhilarating experiences of my career".

In 1961, when Humphries was in Cornwall with his wife, he fell over a cliff near Zennor and landed on a ledge 50 m (150 ft) below, breaking bones. The rescue by helicopter was filmed by a news crew from ITN. The footage of the rescue was shown to Humphries for the first time on a 2006 BBC show, Turn Back Time.

Humphries's first major break on the British stage came when he was cast in the role of the undertaker Mr Sowerberry for the original 1960 London stage production of Oliver! He recorded Sowerberry's feature number "That's Your Funeral" for the original London cast album (released on Decca Records) and reprised the role when the production moved to Broadway in 1963. However, the song "That's Your Funeral" was omitted from the RCA Victor original Broadway cast album, so Humphries is not heard at all on it. In 1967, he starred as Fagin in the Piccadilly Theatre's revival of Oliver!, which featured a young Phil Collins as the Artful Dodger. In 1997, Humphries reprised the role of Fagin in Cameron Mackintosh's award-winning revival at the London Palladium.

In 1967, his friendship with Cook and Moore led to his first film role, a cameo as "Envy" in the film Bedazzled, starring Cook and Moore, with Eleanor Bron and directed by Stanley Donen. The following year, he appeared in The Bliss of Mrs. Blossom, with Shirley MacLaine.

Humphries contributed to BBC Television's The Late Show (1966–67), but Humphries found his true calling with his one-man satirical stage revues, in which he performed as Edna Everage and other character creations including Sandy Stone. A Nice Night's Entertainment (1962) was the first such revue. It and Excuse I: Another Nice Night's Entertainment (1965) were only performed in Australia. In 1968 Humphries returned to Australia to tour his one-man revue Just a Show; this production transferred to London's Fortune Theatre in 1969. Humphries gained considerable notoriety with Just a Show. It polarised British critics but was successful enough to lead to a short-lived BBC television series, The Barry Humphries Scandals.

=== 1970s ===
In 1970, Humphries returned to Australia, where Edna Everage made her movie debut in John B. Murray's The Naked Bunyip. In 1971–72 he teamed up with producer Phillip Adams and writer-director Bruce Beresford to create a film version of the Barry McKenzie cartoons. The Adventures of Barry McKenzie starred singer Barry Crocker in the title role and featured Humphries—who co-wrote the script with Beresford—playing three different parts. It was filmed in England and Australia with an all-star cast including Spike Milligan, Peter Cook, Dennis Price, Dick Bentley, Willie Rushton, Julie Covington, Clive James and broadcaster Joan Bakewell. It was almost unanimously panned by Australian film critics, but became a huge hit with audiences. The film became the first Australian feature film to make more than $1 million at the box office, paving the way for the success of subsequent locally made feature films such as Alvin Purple and Picnic at Hanging Rock. It has been argued that Humphries was the first "proper" movie star of the Australian movie revival and was under-used as a star of local films.

Another artistic production undertaken at this time was a 1972 collaboration between Humphries and the Australian composer Nigel Butterley. Together, they produced First Day Covers, a collection of poems about suburbia – read in performance by Edna Everage – with accompanying music by Butterley. It included poems with titles such as "Histoire du Lamington" and "Morceau en forme de 'meat pie'".

=== Film roles ===
From the late 1960s, Humphries appeared in numerous films, mostly in supporting or cameo roles. His credits included Bedazzled (1967), the UK sex comedy Percy's Progress (1974), David Baker's The Great Macarthy (1975), and Bruce Beresford's Barry McKenzie Holds His Own (1974), in which Edna was made a dame by then Australian prime minister Gough Whitlam.

His other film credits included Side by Side (1975) and The Getting of Wisdom (1977). The same year, he had a cameo as Edna in the Robert Stigwood musical film Sgt. Pepper's Lonely Hearts Club Band, followed in 1981 by his part as the fake-blind TV-show host Bert Schnick in Shock Treatment, the sequel to The Rocky Horror Picture Show.

Humphries was more successful with his featured role as Richard Deane in Dr. Fischer of Geneva (1985); this was followed by Howling III (1987), a cameo as Rupert Murdoch in the miniseries Selling Hitler (1991) with Alexei Sayle, a three-role cameo in Philippe Mora's horror satire Pterodactyl Woman from Beverly Hills (1995), the role of Count Metternich in Immortal Beloved (1994), as well as roles in The Leading Man (1996), the Spice Girls' film Spice World, the Australian feature Welcome to Woop Woop (1997), and Nicholas Nickleby (2002), in which he donned female garb to play Nathan Lane's wife.

Humphries featured in various roles in comedy performance films including The Secret Policeman's Other Ball (1982) and A Night of Comic Relief 2 (1989). In 1987, he starred as Les Patterson in one of his own rare flops, Les Patterson Saves the World, directed by George T. Miller of Man From Snowy River fame and co-written by Humphries with his third wife, Diane Millstead.

In 2003, Humphries voiced the shark Bruce in the Pixar animated film Finding Nemo, using an exaggerated baritone Australian accent.

During 2011, Humphries travelled to New Zealand to perform the role of the Great Goblin in the first instalment of Peter Jackson's three-part adaptation of J. R. R. Tolkien's The Hobbit. At the press conference in Wellington, New Zealand, just before the film's world premiere, Humphries commented:

It was thrilling to work on this film and when you see my extraordinary interpretation you realise why I immediately fell into the arms of Jenny Craig, and minor cosmetic surgery. I always thought motion capture was something you did when you were taking a specimen at the doctor.

In 2015, Humphries voiced the role of Wombo the Wombat in Blinky Bill the Movie.

In 2016, he appeared in a dual role in Absolutely Fabulous: The Movie as Charlie, a rich former lover of Patsy Stone, and in a nonspeaking cameo as Dame Edna.

=== One-man shows ===
Humphries's forte was always his one-man satirical stage revues, in which he appeared as Edna Everage and other character creations, most commonly Les Patterson and Sandy Stone. The longevity of Dame Edna endured for more than sixty years, but, in 2012, he announced his retirement from live performance.

Humphries's one-man shows, which were typically two and a half hours long, alternated satirical monologues and musical numbers and consisted of entirely original material, laced with ad-libbing, improvisation and audience participation segments. Humphries mostly performed solo, but he was occasionally joined on stage by supporting dancers and an accompanist during the musical numbers. Only one actor ever regularly shared the stage with Humphries, and this was during the Edna segments: English actress Emily Perry played Edna's long-suffering bridesmaid from New Zealand, Madge Allsop, whose character never spoke.

Humphries presented many successful shows in London, most of which he subsequently toured internationally. Although he eventually gained worldwide popularity, he encountered stiff resistance in the early years of his career: his first London one-man show, A Nice Night's Entertainment (1962), received scathing reviews. He gained considerable notoriety with his next one-man revue, Just a Show, staged at London's Fortune Theatre in 1969. It polarised the critics but was a hit with audiences and became the basis of a growing cult following in the UK. He further developed the character of Edna Everage in his early-1970s' shows, including A Load of Olde Stuffe (1971) and At Least You Can Say You've Seen It (1974–75).

He finally broke through to widespread critical and audience acclaim in Britain with his 1976 London production Housewife, Superstar! at the Apollo Theatre. Its success in Britain and Australia led Humphries to try his luck with the show in New York City in 1977 at the off-Broadway Theatre Four (now called the Julia Miles Theatre), but it proved to be a disastrous repeat of his experience with Just a Show. Humphries later summed up his negative reception by saying: "When The New York Times tells you to close, you close."

His next show was Isn't It Pathetic at His Age (1978), and, like many of his shows, the title derives from the sarcastic remarks his mother often made when she took Humphries to the theatre to see superannuated overseas actors touring in Australia during his youth.

His subsequent one-man shows included:

- A Night with Dame Edna (1979), for which he won an Olivier Award for Best Comedy Performance
- An Evening's Intercourse with Dame Edna (1982)
- Back with a Vengeance (1987–1989, 2005–2007)
- Look at Me When I'm Talking to You (1996)
- Edna, The Spectacle (1998) at the Theatre Royal Haymarket, where he held the record as the only solo act to fill the theatre (since it opened in 1720)
- Remember You're Out which toured Australia in 1999
- Dame Edna Live: The First Last Tour toured the US in 2009

He made numerous theatrical tours in Germany, Scandinavia, the Netherlands, and the Far and Middle East. In 2003, he toured Australia with his show Getting Back to My Roots (and Other Suckers).

For his delivery of Dadaist and absurdist humour to millions, his biographer Anne Pender described Humphries in 2010 as not only "the most significant theatrical figure of our time ... [but] the most significant comedian to emerge since Charlie Chaplin".

=== Television roles ===
Humphries's numerous television appearances in Australia, the UK and the U.S. included The Bunyip, a children's comedy for the Seven Network in Melbourne. In the UK, he made two highly successful series of his comedy talk show The Dame Edna Experience for London Weekend Television. The series featured a variety of famous guests, including Liza Minnelli, Sean Connery, Roger Moore, Dusty Springfield, Charlton Heston, Lauren Bacall, and Jane Seymour.

These highly popular programmes have since been repeated worldwide, and the special A Night on Mount Edna won Humphries the Golden Rose of Montreux in 1991. He wrote and starred in ABC-TV's The Life and Death of Sandy Stone (1991), and presented the ABC social history series Barry Humphries' Flashbacks (1998).

His other television shows and one-off specials include Dame Edna's Neighbourhood Watch (1992), Dame Edna's Work Experience (1996), Dame Edna Kisses It Better (1997) and Dame Edna's Hollywood (1991–92), a series of three chat-show specials filmed in the U.S. for the NBC and the Fox network. Like The Dame Edna Experience, these included an array of top celebrity guests such as Burt Reynolds, Cher, Bea Arthur, Kim Basinger and Barry Manilow. Edna's most recent television special was Dame Edna Live at the Palace in 2003. He starred in the Kath & Kim telemovie Da Kath & Kim Code in late 2005.

In 1977, Dame Edna guest-starred on the U.S. sketch comedy and variety show Saturday Night Live.

In 2007, Humphries returned to the UK's ITV to host another comedy chat show called The Dame Edna Treatment, a similar format to The Dame Edna Experience from 20 years earlier. The series once again had a collection of high-profile celebrity guests, such as Tim Allen, Mischa Barton, Sigourney Weaver, Debbie Harry, and Shirley Bassey.

In March 2008, Humphries joined the judging panel on the BBC talent show I'd Do Anything to find an unknown lead to play the part of Nancy in a West End revival of the musical Oliver!.

In May 2013, Australia's ABC Network announced that Humphries would be joining the cast of the Australian telemovie series, Jack Irish, playing a high-profile judge in the third movie in the series. He appeared as Justice Loder in the 2014 "Dead Point" episode.

=== Success in the United States ===
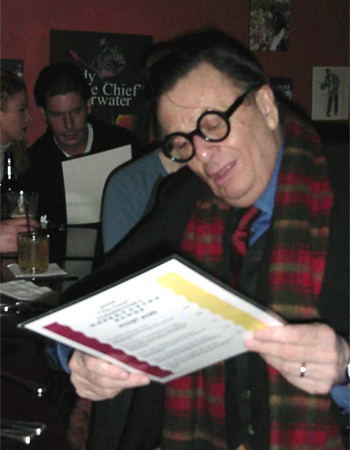
Humphries in Toronto, Canada, during Dame Edna: The Royal Tour North American tour, December 2000

In 2000 Humphries took his Dame Edna: The Royal Tour show to North America winning the inaugural Special Tony Award for a Live Theatrical Event in 2000 and won two National Broadway Theatre Awards for "Best Play" and for "Best Actor" in 2001. Asked by an Australian journalist what it was like to win a Tony Award, he said "it was like winning a thousand Gold Logies at the same time".

Dame Edna's new-found success in the United States led to many media opportunities, including a semi-regular role in the hit TV series Ally McBeal. Vanity Fair magazine invited Dame Edna to write a satirical advice column in 2003, although, after an outcry following a remark about learning Spanish, the column was discontinued.

As of September 2021, Humphries was honorary vice-president of the American Guild of Variety Artists trade union.

=== Farewell tour ===
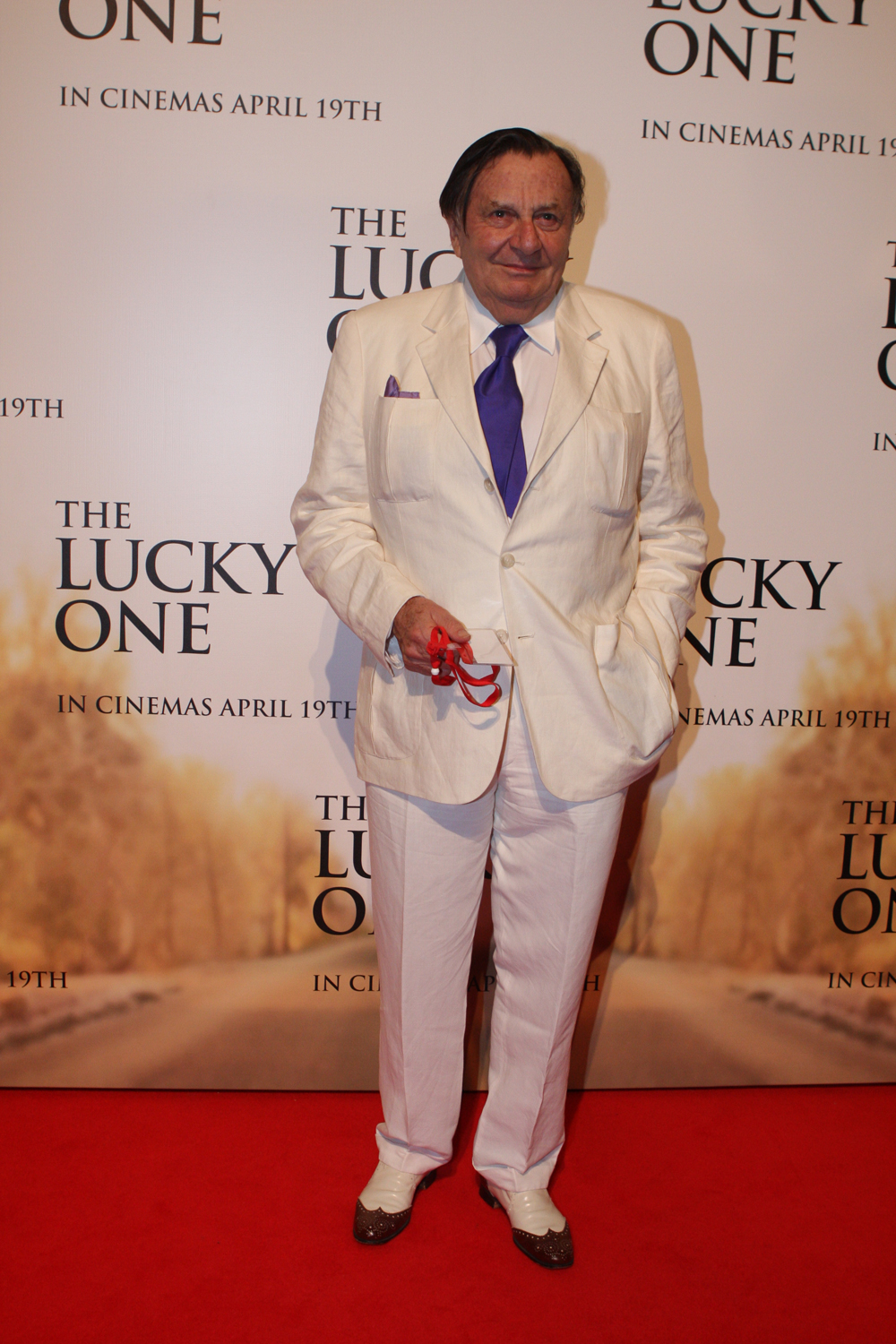
Humphries in 2012

In March 2012, Humphries announced his retirement from live entertainment, stating that he was "beginning to feel a bit senior" and was planning to retire from show business. Humphries announced his Australian "Farewell Tour", titled "Eat, Pray, Laugh!", to begin in Canberra on 22 July 2012 and to conclude in Perth on 3 February 2013, although it was extended until 10 February. The show included appearances by Dame Edna, Sir Les Patterson and Sandy Stone, and introduced a new character called Gerard Patterson, Sir Les's brother and a paedophilic Catholic priest.

The tour was widely praised. Dan Ilic of Time Out Sydney stated that Humphries delivered "a show that almost feels like a blueprint for the foundations for the last fifty years of Australian comedy". Helen Musa of CityNews gave a similarly positive review, referring to Humphries being "as virile, as vulgar and as magnificent as ever" thanks to a "well researched" script. Arts blog Critter Away referred to Humphries' characters as being "still fresh" and "a testament to laugh-out-loud satire".

The same show opened in the United Kingdom at the Milton Keynes Theatre in October 2013 prior to a season of shows at the London Palladium and a national tour.

=== Weimar Cabaret ===
Humphries emceed a program of Weimar Republic cabaret songs performed by chanteuse Meow Meow and accompanied by the Australian Chamber Orchestra in July–August 2016 and then by the Aurora Orchestra in July 2018.

== Characters ==
=== Dame Edna Everage ===
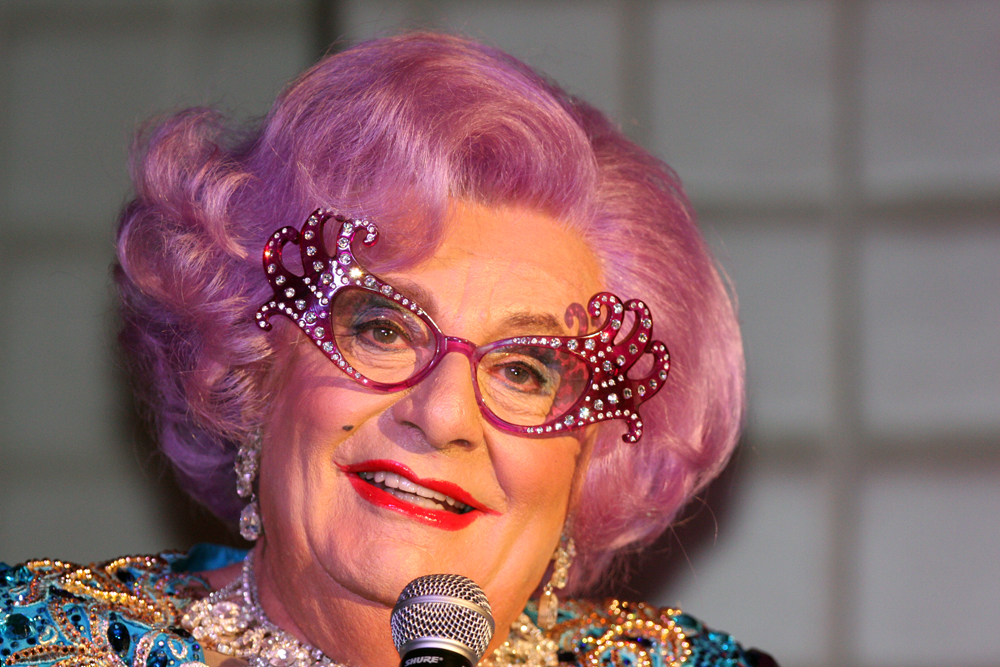
Humphries as Dame Edna, 2012

Humphries was probably best known for his persona Dame Edna Everage. Originally conceived in 1956, Edna evolved from a satire of Australian suburbia to become, in the words of journalist Caroline Overington:

a perfect parody of a modern, vainglorious celebrity with a rampant ego and a strong aversion to the audience (whom celebrities pretend to love but actually, as Edna so boldly makes transparent, they actually loathe for their cheap shoes and suburban values)

Like her bunches of gladioli, one of the most distinctive features of Edna's stage and TV appearances was her wardrobe, with custom-made gowns. Her costumes, most of which were created for her by Australian designer Bill Goodwin, routinely incorporated Aussie kitsch icons such as the flag, Australian native animals and flowers, the Sydney Opera House and the boxing kangaroo. Her spectacles were inspired by the glasses worn by the Melbourne eccentric, actor and dancer Stephanie Deste, as were many other aspects of Dame Edna's personality.

As the character evolved, Edna's unseen family became an integral part of the satire, particularly the travails of her disabled husband Norm, who had an almost lifelong onslaught of an unspecified prostate ailment. Her daughter Valmai and her gay hairdresser son Kenny became intrinsic elements of the act, as did her long-suffering best friend and New Zealand bridesmaid, Madge Allsop.

Throughout Edna's career, Madge was played by English actress Emily Perry, until Perry's death in 2008. Perry was the only other actor ever to appear on stage with Humphries in his stage shows, as well as making regular appearances in Dame Edna's TV programmes.

Dame Edna made a successful transition from stage to TV. The talk-show format provided an outlet for Humphries' ability to ad-lib in character, and it enabled Edna to reach a wider range audience. As other Australian actors have begun to make a wider impression internationally, Edna did not hesitate to reveal that it was her mentorship that helped "kiddies" like "little Nicole Kidman" to achieve their early success.

=== Sir Les Patterson ===
Humphries's character, Sir Les Patterson, was a boozy Australian cultural attaché: dishevelled, uncouth, lecherous and coarse. He alternated with Edna and Sandy Stone in Humphries's stage shows and typically featured in pre-recorded segments in Dame Edna's TV shows. Sir Les was the polar opposite of Dame Edna; she was a culturally aspirational Protestant from Melbourne and he was a culture-free Roman Catholic from Sydney. In December 1987, Humphries appeared on the BBC Radio 4 program Today in a recorded interview in which he simultaneously played the characters of both Dame Edna and Sir Les.

=== Sandy Stone ===
Humphries's character, Sandy Stone, was an elderly Australian man, either single or married with a daughter who died as a child. Humphries said in 2016 that "slowly the character has deepened, so I begin to understand and appreciate him, and finally feel myself turning into him". As Humphries aged, he no longer required makeup for the part and played Sandy in his own dressing gown.

== Personal life ==
Humphries was married four times. His first marriage, to Brenda Wright, took place when he was 21 and lasted less than two years. He had two daughters, Tessa and Emily, and two sons, Oscar and Rupert, from his second and third marriages to Rosalind Tong and Diane Millstead respectively. His elder son, Oscar, was editor of the art magazine Apollo and a contributing editor at The Spectator. He is now an art curator. His younger son, Rupert, is the senior vice president of narrative at Rockstar Games. His fourth wife (from 1990 until his death in 2023), Elizabeth Spender, previously an actress, is the daughter of British poet Sir Stephen Spender and the concert pianist Natasha Spender. They lived in a terraced townhouse in South Hampstead, his home for forty years.

In the 1960s, Humphries was dependent on alcohol, and in a 2004 interview with Andrew Barrow, described himself as having been "a dissolute, guilt-ridden, self-pitying boozer". His alcoholism reached a crisis point during a visit home to Australia in the early 1970s. His parents finally had him admitted to a private hospital to 'dry out', when, after a particularly heavy binge, he was found battered and unconscious in a gutter. After that incident, he abstained from alcohol completely and occasionally attended Alcoholics Anonymous (AA) meetings. He later said, "I realised there was no future in it for me. I had done everything I could with alcohol except die. And after that, things took off in a wonderful way. It was like I'd been driving in a car with the handbrake on for years." Humphries was one of many friends who tried in vain to help Peter Cook, who eventually died from alcohol-related illnesses.

Humphries was a friend of the English poet John Betjeman until Betjeman's death in 1984. Their friendship began in 1960, after Betjeman, while visiting Australia, heard some of Humphries's early recordings and wrote very favourably of them in an Australian newspaper. Their friendship was, in part, based on numerous shared interests, including Victorian architecture, Cornwall and the music hall.

Humphries appeared in the 2013 documentary Chalky about his longtime friend and colleague Michael White, who produced many of Humphries' first Dame Edna shows in the UK.

Other notable friends of Humphries included the painter Arthur Boyd, the author and former politician Jeffrey Archer, whom Humphries visited during Archer's stay in prison, and the comedian Spike Milligan.

Humphries spent much of his life immersed in music, literature and the arts. A self-proclaimed 'bibliomaniac', his house in West Hampstead, London, supposedly contained some 25,000 books, many of them first editions of the late 19th and early 20th centuries. Some of the more arcane and rare items in this collection include the telephone book of Oscar Wilde, Memoirs of a Public Baby by Philip O'Connor, an autographed copy of Humdrum by Harold Acton, the complete works of Wilfred Childe and several volumes of the pre-war surrealist poetry of Herbert Read. He was elected a member of the Roxburghe Club, an exclusive bibliophilic society, in 2011.

Humphries was a prominent art collector who, as a result of his three divorces, bought many of his favourite paintings four times. He at one time had the largest private collection of the paintings of Charles Conder in the world and he was a great admirer of the Flemish symbolist painter Jan Frans De Boever, relishing his role as 'President for Life' of the De Boever Society. He himself was a landscape painter and his pictures are in private and public collections both in his homeland and abroad. Humphries was also the subject of numerous portraits by artist friends, including Clifton Pugh (1958, National Portrait Gallery) and John Brack (in the character of Edna Everage, 1969, Art Gallery of New South Wales).

Humphries enjoyed avant-garde music and was a patron of, among others, the French composer Jean-Michel Damase and the Melba Foundation in Australia. Humphries was a patron and active supporter of the Tait Memorial Trust in London, a charity to support young Australian performing artists in the UK. When Humphries was a guest on the BBC's Desert Island Discs radio programme in 2009, he made the following choices: "Mir ist die Ehre widerfahren" from Strauss' Der Rosenkavalier; Gershwin's "Things are Looking Up" sung by Fred Astaire; "Love Song" composed by Josef Suk; "On Mother Kelly's Doorstep" sung by Randolph Sutton; "Der Leiermann" from Schubert's Winterreise song cycle; the 2nd movement of Poulenc's Flute Sonata; Mischa Spoliansky's "Auf Wiedersehen"; and "They are not long the weeping and the laughter" from Delius' Songs of Sunset.

Cultural historian Tony Moore, author of The Barry McKenzie Movies, writes of Humphries' personal politics thus: "A conservative contrarian while many in his generation were moving left, Humphries nevertheless retained a bohemian delight in transgression that makes him a radical."

Humphries had two brothers and a sister in Melbourne. His brother Christopher worked as an architect, his brother Michael (1946–2020) was a teacher and historian, and his sister Barbara is also a former schoolteacher.

=== Views on transgender people ===
In 2018, Humphries was criticised on social media for making perceived transphobic remarks. The comments included referring to gender-affirmation surgery as "self-mutilation" and transgender identity as a whole as a "fashion—how many different kinds of lavatory can you have?" The comments prompted the Barry Award, a comedy festival award in Melbourne named after the comedian, to be renamed the Melbourne International Comedy Festival Award the next year.

=== Death ===
Following a fall in February 2023, Humphries died after complications from hip surgery at St Vincent's Hospital in Darlinghurst, Sydney, on 22 April 2023, aged 89.

After his funeral, Humphries' remains were taken to Northern Suburbs Memorial Gardens and Crematorium for cremation. His ashes were scattered in an undisclosed place.

Tributes to Humphries were given by members of the British royal family including Charles III, by Australian prime minister Anthony Albanese and Western Australian premier Mark McGowan. Tributes were also given by members of the entertainment industry including Michael Parkinson, Eric Idle and Ricky Gervais.

== Other work ==
=== Bibliography ===
Humphries was the author of many books, including two autobiographies, two novels and a treatise on Chinese drama in the goldfields. He wrote several plays and made dozens of recordings. His first autobiography, More Please, won the J. R. Ackerley Prize for Autobiography in 1993.

- Bizarre. Compilation. London: Elek Books, 1965. ISBN 9780517138809
- The Barry Humphries Book of Innocent Austral Verse. Anthology. Melbourne: Sun Books, 1968. ISBN 0702222216
- Bazza Pulls It Off!: More Adventures of Barry McKenzie. Melbourne: Sun Books, 1971. ISBN 0233964126
- The Wonderful World of Barry MacKenzie. With Nicholas Garland; a comic strip. London: Private Eye/Andre Deutsch, 1971. ISBN 9780233964140
- Barry McKenzie Holds His Own. Photoplay, with Bruce Beresford. Melbourne: Sun Books, 1974. ISBN 9780725101978
- Dame Edna's Coffee Table Book: A guide to gracious living and the finer things of life by one of the first ladies of world theatre. Compendium. Sydney: Sphere Books, 1976. ISBN 9780245530463
- Les Patterson's Australia. Melbourne: Sun Books, 1978. ISBN 9780725103033
- Bazza Comes into His Own: The Final Fescennine Farago of Barry McKenzie, Australia's first working-class hero—with learned and scholarly appendices and a new enlarged glossary. With Nicholas Garland. Melbourne, Sun Books, 1979. ISBN 0-7333-2591-2
- The Sound of Edna: Dame Edna's Family Songbook. With Nick Rowley. London: Chappell, 1979. ISBN 0903443341
- A Treasury of Australian Kitsch. Melbourne: Macmillan, 1980. ISBN 0333299558
- A Nice Night's Entertainment: Sketches and Monologues 1956–1981. A Retrospective. Sydney: Currency Press, 1981. ISBN 0246117273
- Dame Edna's Bedside Companion. Compendium. London: Weidenfeld and Nicolson, 1982. ISBN 0552122726
- Punch Down Under. London: Robson Books, 1984. ISBN 0860512967
- The Traveller's Tool. London: Michael O'Mara Books, 1985. ISBN 9780333401354
- The Complete Barry McKenzie. Sydney: Allen & Unwin, 1988. ISBN 9780413193100
- Shades of Sandy Stone. Edinburgh, Tragara Press, 1989. Limited edition. ISBN 0948189274
- My Gorgeous Life. As Edna Everage. London: Macmillan, 1989. ISBN 0671709763
- More Please. Autobiography. London, New York, Ringwood, Toronto, and Auckland: Viking, 1992. ISBN 9780140231939
- The Life and Death of Sandy Stone. Sydney: Macmillan, 1990. ISBN 9780732903305
- Neglected Poems. Sydney: Angus & Robertson, 1991. ISBN 0207172129
- Women in the Background. Novel. Port Melbourne: William Heinemann Australia, 1995. ISBN 9780141020938
- Barry Humphries' Flashbacks: The book of the acclaimed TV series. Sydney and London: HarperCollins, 1999. ISBN 0002558963
- My Life As Me: A Memoir: Autobiography. London: Michael Joseph, 2002. ISBN 9780670888344
- Handling Edna: the Unauthorised Biography. Sydney, Hachette Australia, 2009. ISBN 9780297860853

=== Filmography ===
Name	Character	Year	Notes	Ref
Bedazzled	Envy	1967		
The Adventures of Barry McKenzie	Aunt Edna Everage / Hoot / Dr DeLamphrey	1972	multiple roles	
Barry McKenzie Holds His Own	Aunt Edna Everage / Dr DeLamphrey	1974	dual role	
Percy's Progress	Dr Anderson / Australian TV Lady	1974	dual role	
Side by Side	Rodney	1975		
The Great Macarthy	Colonel Ball-Miller	1975		
The Getting of Wisdom	Reverend Strachey	1977		
Shock Treatment	Bert Schnick	1981		
Dr. Fischer of Geneva	Richard Deane	1985	TV film	
Les Patterson Saves the World	Sir Les Patterson / Dame Edna Everage	1986	dual role	
Immortal Beloved	Klemens von Metternich	1994		
Napoleon	Kangaroo	1995	voice	
Pterodactyl Woman from Beverly Hills	Bert / Lady shopper / Manager	1995	multiple roles	
Spice World	Kevin McMaxford	1997		
Welcome to Woop Woop	Blind Wally	1997		
Finding Nemo	Bruce the Shark	2003	voice	
Da Kath & Kim Code	John Monk	2005	TV film	
Salvation	Brothel customer	2007		
Mary and Max	Narrator	2009	voice	
The Kangaroo Gang	Narrator	2011	TV documentary, voice	
The Hobbit: An Unexpected Journey	Great Goblin	2012	motion capture	
Kath & Kimderella	Dame Edna Everage	2012		
The Last Impresario		2013	documentary, self	
Justin and the Knights of Valour	Braulio	2013	voice	
Blinky Bill the Movie	Wombo	2015	voice	
Absolutely Fabulous: The Movie	Charlie / Dame Edna Everage	2016	dual role	
The Magical Land of Oz	Narrator	2019	wildlife documentary, voice	

=== Discography ===
Humphries developed an extensive knowledge of the history of jazz music. He shared this passion with Melbourne music producer Bill Armstrong, and they collaborated on a series of four double-CDs under Armstrong's Bilarm label, comprising a collection of rare performances, interviews, and archival material. This proved to be a significant contribution to the preservation of material that would otherwise have been lost. The series was titled So Rare, and was re-released on digital services in May 2024.

Humphries own audio recordings include:

- Wild Life in Suburbia (1958)
- Wild Life in Suburbia Volume Two (1959)
- A Nice Night's Entertainment (1962)
- Chunder Down Under (1965)
- Barry Humphries at Carnegie Hall (Note: A local hall located at 60 Rosstown Rd, in the Melbourne suburb of Carnegie, NOT New York.) (1972)
- The Barry Humphries Record of Innocent Austral Verse (1972)
- Housewife Superstar! (1976)
- The Sound of Edna (1978)
- Dame Edna presents the Last Night of the Poms (1981)

=== Biographical studies ===
Humphries has been the subject of several critical and biographical studies and a TV documentary:

- The Real Barry Humphries by Peter Coleman. London: Coronet Books, 1991.
- Dame Edna Everage and the Rise of Western Civilization: Backstage with Barry Humphries by John Lahr. London: Bloomsbury, 1991; and New York: Farrar Straus Giroux, 1992.
- A portrait of the artist as Australian: l'oeuvre bizarre de Barry Humphries, by Paul Matthew St. Pierre, 2004.
- The Man Inside Dame Edna, TV documentary, by Adrian Sibley, 2008
- One Man Show: The Stages of Barry Humphries by Anne Pender. HarperCollins, 2010.

=== Fictional characters ===
- Dame Edna Everage (Melbourne housewife)
- Sir Les Patterson (Australian cultural attaché)
- Sandy Stone (elderly Australian)
- Barry McKenzie (Australian visitor to Britain)

== Awards and honours ==
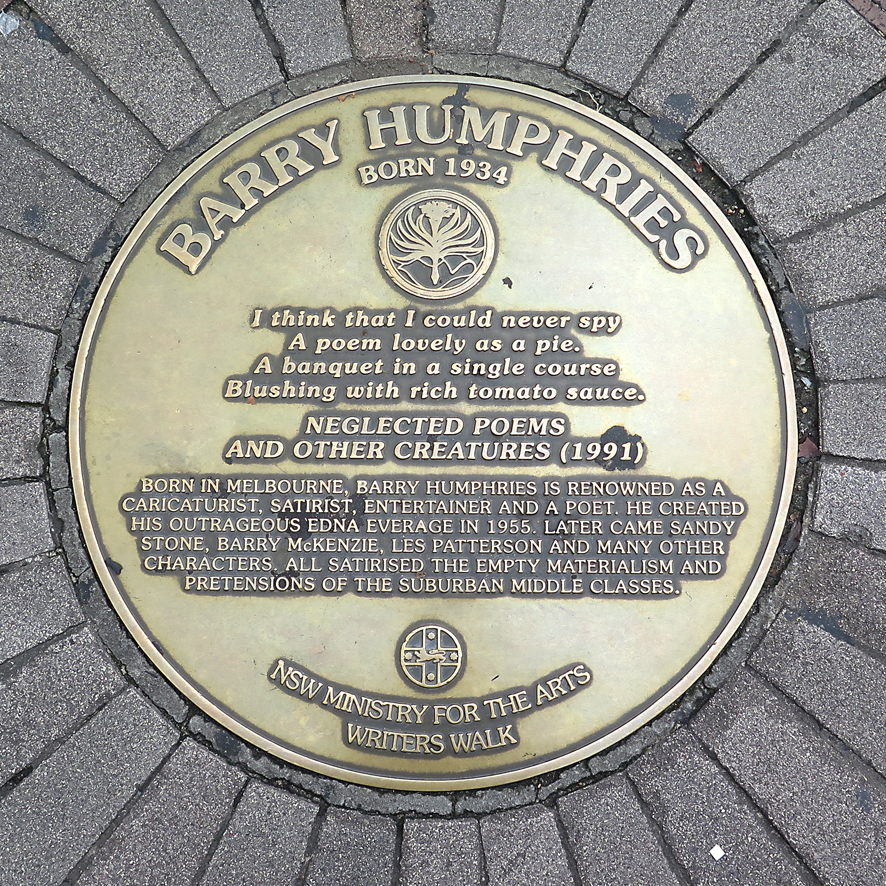
Plaque for Humphries at the Sydney Writers Walk

- 1979: Comedy Performance of the Year, Society of West End Management, London (now known as the Laurence Olivier awards) for A Night with Dame Edna
- 1990: TV Personality of the Year
- 1993: J. R. Ackerley Prize for Autobiography for More, Please
- 1993: Mo Award: Australian Show business Ambassador
- 1994: Honorary Doctorate at Griffith University
- 1997: Sir Peter Ustinov Award for Comedy presented at the Banff World Television Festival
- 1997: Honoured Artists Award, Melbourne City Council
- 1999: British Comedy Awards – Lifetime Achievement Award
- 2000: Special Tony Award for a live theatrical event at the 55th Annual Tony Awards for Dame Edna: The Royal Tour
- 2000: Special Achievement Award by the Outer Critics Circle for The Royal Tour
- 2003: Honorary Doctorate of Law at his alma mater, University of Melbourne
- 2007: JC Williamson Award for his life's work in the Australian live performance industry.
- 2011: Oldie of the Year for "his wonderful split personality which has entertained us for so many years"
- 2013: Britain-Australia Society Award for contribution to the relationship between Britain and Australia
- 2014: Aardman Slapstick Comedy Legend Award – lifetime achievement award.
- 2016: Honorary Doctorate at the University of South Australia.
- 2017: Honorary Fellow of King's College London.

Humphries was nominated four times for a British Academy Television Award (BAFTA TV), all in the Best Light Entertainment Performance category:

- 1981: An Audience with Dame Edna Everage
- 1987: The Dame Edna Experience
- 1988: One More Audience with Dame Edna
- 1990: The Dame Edna Experience

He received national honours in Australia and the United Kingdom:

- 1982: Officer of the Order of Australia (AO) for "services to the theatre" (Queen's Birthday Honours, Australian List)
- 1982: Granted a coat of arms by the College of Arms with a shield bearing crossed gladioli and the Sydney Opera House, supported by a shark and a possum both wearing butterfly glasses, along with other symbolism containing a funnel-web spider and a blowfly. His motto is "I share and I care".
- 2001: Centenary Medal for service to Australian society through acting and writing
- 2007: Commander of the Order of the British Empire (CBE) for "services to entertainment" (Queen's Birthday Honours, UK List)
- 2023: Posthumously appointed as a Companion of the Order of Australia in the 2023 King's Birthday Honours for "eminent service to the arts as a comedian, actor, author, satirist and entertainer, to the promotion of Australian culture, and as a patron of organisations".
