= Dame Edna Everage =

Fictional Australian character

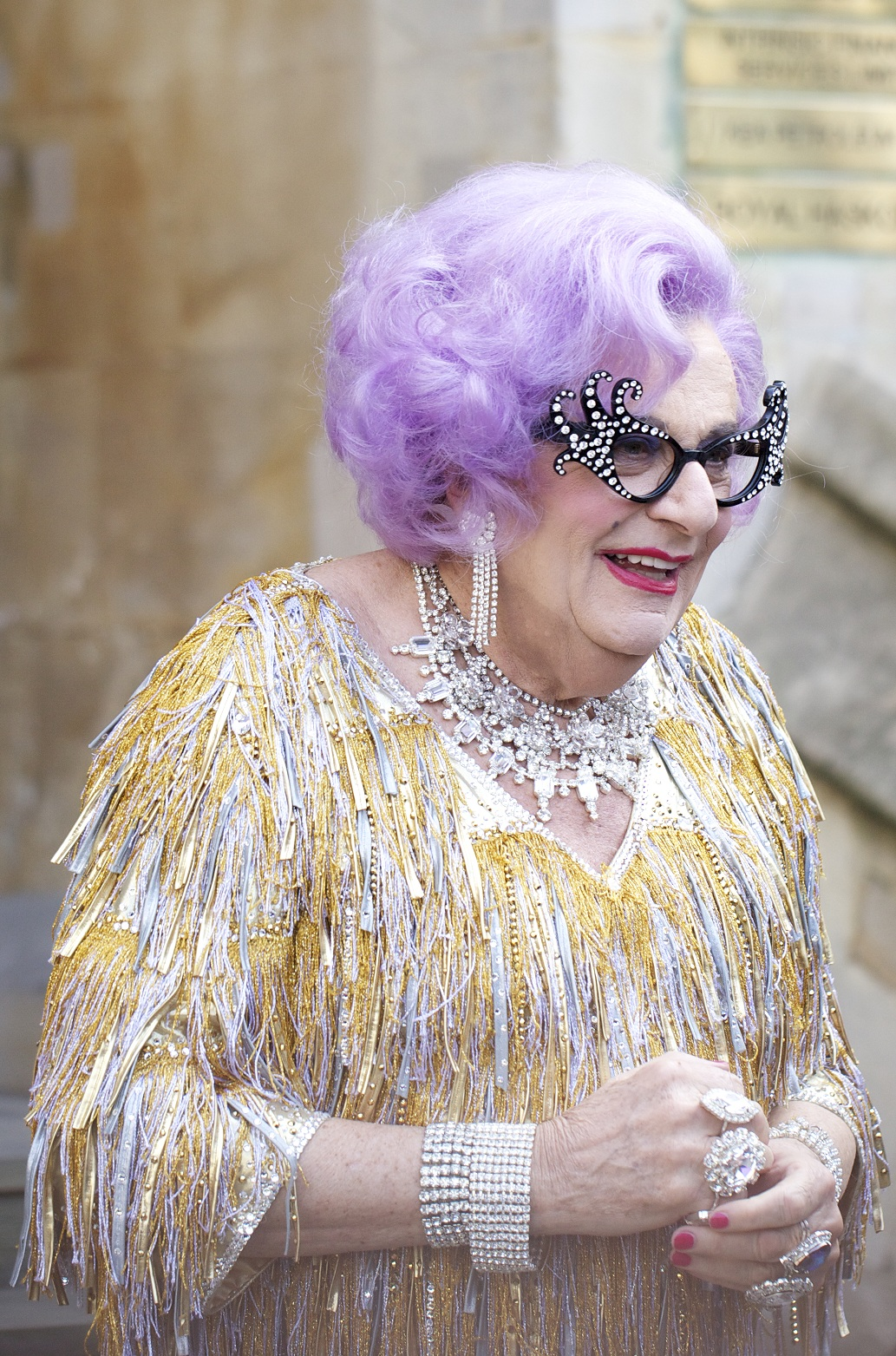
- Dame Edna in 2011
- First appearance: December 1955, Return Fare
- Last appearance: 2022, The Queen’s Platinum Jubilee Celebrations – Video message
- Created by: Barry Humphries
- Portrayed by: Barry Humphries

In-universe information
- Nicknames: "Dame Edna" "Mrs. Norm Everage" "Mrs. Norman Everage"
- Gender: Female
- Title: Dame
- Occupation: Television personality
- Spouse: Norman "Norm" Stoddard Everage (until 1988; his death)
- Children: Kenny Everage; Bruce Everage; Valmai Gittis; Lois Everage
- Relatives: Barry McKenzie (nephew)
- Religion: Christian (Protestant)

Dame Edna Everage, often known simply as Dame Edna, is a character which was created and portrayed by Australian comedian Barry Humphries, known for her lilac-coloured ("wisteria hue") hair and cat eye glasses ("face furniture"); her favourite flower, the gladiolus ("gladdies"); and her boisterous greeting "Hello, Possums!" As Dame Edna, Humphries wrote several books, including an autobiography, My Gorgeous Life; appeared in several films; and hosted several television shows (on which Humphries also appeared as himself and other alter-egos).

Humphries regularly updated Edna. Starting as a drab Melbourne housewife satirising Australian suburbia, the character adopted an increasingly outlandish wardrobe after performances in London in the 1960s, through which she grew in stature and popularity.

Edna was known for her outlandish spectacles. Humphries claimed the eyeglasses, and other aspects of Edna's personality, were inspired by Stephanie Deste, a Melbourne eccentric, beautician, radio broadcaster, actor and dancer.

Following film appearances and an elevation to damehood in the 1970s, the character evolved to "Housewife and Superstar", then "Megastar" and finally "Gigastar". Throughout the 1980s and 1990s, Dame Edna became increasingly known in North America after multiple stage and television appearances.

Edna described her chat-shows as "an intimate conversation between two friends, one of whom is a lot more interesting than the other". The character was used to satirise the cult of celebrity, class snobbery, and prudishness and was often used by Humphries to poke fun at the political leaders and fashions of the times. Her exuberant persona and scathing commentary on society and celebrity, as well as her habit of treating celebrities like ordinary people (on her television shows) and ordinary people like celebrities (in her stage shows) became signatures.

Although Humphries freely stated that Edna was a character he played, Edna referred to Humphries as her "entrepreneur" or manager. Humphries and his staff of assistants and writers only referred to Edna as "she" and "her", never mixing the character with Humphries.

In March 2012, Humphries announced that the character would be retired at the end of the current stage tour, but later in 2013 he decided to bring her back. Humphries died in April 2023, having played Edna for almost 68 years.

== Character story ==
While Dame Edna was a fictitious character (whose life story was entirely created by Barry Humphries), so complete is her identity as an individual that Macmillan published My Gorgeous Life, Edna's "autobiography" (written by Humphries but credited to Edna herself), on its non-fiction list. Humphries also wrote an "Unauthorised Biography" of his life as Edna's manager: Handling Edna, published in 2010.

According to My Gorgeous Life, and statements Edna made over the years, she was born Edna May Beazley in Wagga Wagga, New South Wales, with a sibling who would give birth to Barry McKenzie. Everage started her stage career in a sketch entitled "Olympic Hostess" in the revue Return Fare on 19 December 1955 as Mrs. Norm Everage, an "average Australian housewife" from Moonee Ponds, a suburb in Melbourne, Victoria. ("Everage" mimics the Australian pronunciation of "average".) The character gradually evolved over the course of decades from being a typical suburban housewife to being an Australian showbiz personality (and eventually a world-wide star), who became increasingly festooned with honours and established herself as part of the social elite. She spent her time visiting world leaders and jet-setting between her homes in Los Angeles, London, Sydney, Switzerland and Martha's Vineyard. She was a friend and confidante of Queen Elizabeth II and advised prime ministers and presidents. Edna once took an on-air phone call from President Ronald Reagan to assure him that he was, indeed, still the president; and at stageshows she claimed to be giving former Australian Prime Minister, Julia Gillard, elocution lessons.

The character had three adult children, Bruce, Kenny, and Valmai. Her first daughter, Lois, when still an infant, went missing and was believed to have been abducted by a "rogue koala" during a family camp in the outback, à la Azaria Chamberlain. In Handling Edna, the Unauthorised Biography, Humphries absolves the koala of any role in the affair and reveals the true fate of Lois, who in fact survived abduction to become a Catholic nun. Edna's surviving daughter, Valmai, assisted Dame Edna on her most recent programmes for ITV1, including The Dame Edna Treatment and assisted on her live tour shows. Edna takes great pride in her two sons: Bruce, who works as an engineer in South Melbourne and is married to Joylene from Ivanhoe, and her youngest, Kenneth (or Kenny), who is a fashion designer in London and the designer of all her frocks. Dame Edna refers often to him and his partner, Clifford Smale, both of whom Edna believes are searching for "Miss Right", although she admits they are looking "in some very strange places". Kenny appeared in Sir Les Patterson's documentary Les Patterson and the Great Chinese Takeaway as a boutique owner in Hong Kong.

Dame Edna's mother was incarcerated in a "maximum-security twilight home for the permanently bewildered". Valmai and Kenny are the only family members who appeared on stage or screen with their mother. Her husband, Sir Norman Everage, died in 1988 after many years in hospital with prostate problems and a "testicular murmur"; Edna founded the non-profit "Friends of the Prostate" in his honour. Dame Edna was not with Norm when he died. And due to his insistence that all his organs be donated, by the time she reached his bedside, Norm had been "globally recycled" and all that remained was "a dent in the pillow". As a result, Dame Edna almost believed that Norm's cremation was a "waste of money".

In the 21st century, Edna demonstrated her social conscience and sensitivity, telling audiences of her intention to adopt an African child from "the country where Madonna shops for her loved ones".

Dame Edna spent many years accompanied by her bridesmaid and constant companion Madge Allsop (played by several actresses the longest running being Emily Perry), a New Zealander from Palmerston North who assisted Dame Edna with her appearances and television shows. (Perry died at the age of 100 in 2008 and Dame Edna's daughter Valmai replaced her on stage). Madge never spoke a public word (although she sang on Comic Relief), and while she was often the butt of Dame Edna's jokes, the two were devoted. In Handling Edna, the Unauthorised Biography, Humphries gives Madge a voice and explains the sad loss of her own husband in New Zealand's boiling mud, whilst the couple were on their honeymoon. When Dame Edna appeared on BBC Radio 4's Desert Island Discs in July 1988, she was permitted to take Madge Allsop to the desert island as her luxury, assuring Sue Lawley that Allsop was an "inanimate object".

Dame Edna was praised for her insights into her homeland. When asked why Australians are so good at sport she commented: "the climate, the diet, the outdoor life, and the total lack of any intellectual distraction".

Dame Edna launched a campaign to be appointed as a BBC newsreader in 2009 after the corporation announced it wished to seek a female newsreader over 50 years old.

Dame Edna claimed to have various medical conditions, such as Asperger syndrome, bipolar disorder, gluten intolerance, restless legs and attention deficit disorder.

In 2016, after Humphries made comments that were criticised as transphobic, Dame Edna's official social media accounts made a post in which she distanced herself from the comments, stating that she had fired him years earlier but that he "refuses to accept dismissal" and opining that he "is losing the plot" and "deserves our pity not our disapproval". In the same message, she also claimed partial Aboriginal Australian and Jewish ancestry.

=== Honours ===
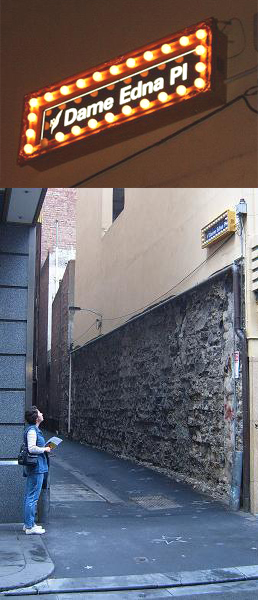
Dame Edna Place in Melbourne, marked by lit signs on each wall

On 7 March 2007, Melbourne renamed a city street in her honour: Dame Edna Place, formerly Brown Alley off Little Collins Street, was officially opened by the Lord Mayor of Melbourne, John So. Dame Edna Place is opposite Royal Arcade and The Causeway, between the major roads, Elizabeth Street and Swanston Street; it was, until its renaming, a service alley for adjoining buildings. Dame Edna was not at the renaming ceremony but was represented by ten look-alike Dames. Everage Street in suburban Moonee Ponds has also been named in her honour.

In 1982, Dame Edna's alter-ego Barry Humphries was made an Officer of the Order of Australia for "services to the theatre" and on 16 June 2007 he was made a Commander of the Order of the British Empire for services to entertainment.

In MAC Cosmetics 2008 Winter Line-Up, a Dame Edna collection of cosmetics were released including eye shadow, lipstick, powder, and nail polish.

A bronze statue was unveiled at Melbourne Docklands in January 2009. It is located by the Yarra river near Harbour Town which also includes statues of singer John Farnham, Dame Nellie Melba, and Graham Kennedy.

In 2020, a species of brightly iridescent Australian soldier fly was named Opaluma ednae in honour of the character, "whose signature hair has a striking resemblance to the colouration of this species." Other species described in the same article were named O. rupaul (after drag queen RuPaul) and O. fabulosa.

== Invention of the character ==
Barry Humphries was invited to join the fledgling Union Theatre Repertory Company early in 1955 and toured Victorian country towns performing Twelfth Night, directed by Ray Lawler. On tour, Humphries invented Edna gradually as part of the entertainment for the actors during commutes between country towns. Humphries gradually developed a falsetto impersonation of a Melbourne housewife, imitating the Country Women's Association representatives who welcomed the troupe in each town. At Lawler's suggestion, Mrs Everage (later named Edna after Humphries' nanny) made her first appearance in a Melbourne University's UTRC revue at the end of 1955, as the city prepared for the 1956 Olympic Games. The sketch involved a houseproud "average housewife" offering her Moonee Ponds home as an Olympic billet, spruiking her home as possessing "burgundy wall-to-wall carpets, lamington cakes and reindeers frosted on glass dining-room doors".

At this time the character was billed as "Mrs Norm Everage" (Humphries describing this name as "Everage as in 'average', husband Norm as in 'normal'") and had none of the characteristic flamboyant wardrobe of later years.

His mother (whom the interviewer William Cook said "sounds like a frightful snob") was a major inspiration for Edna, although he denied it when she was alive to protect her feelings. Her first monologue in 1955 was about her "lovely home", reflecting young Barry's own site visits accompanying his builder father. Originally she was a "mousy" character and too quiet to please the raucous crowd at The Establishment club in London.

According to John Lahr, Edna came into her own during the 1980s when the policies of Thatcherism—and what he described as the "vindictive style of the times"—allowed Dame Edna to sharpen her observations accordingly. Lahr wrote that Edna took Prime Minister Margaret Thatcher's "seemingly hypocritical motto" of "caring and compassion" for others and turned it on its head, Edna became the voice of Humphries' outrage.

In a 2011 interview with CUNY TV, actor Zoe Caldwell claimed that the character had been written with her in mind, but that she turned it down as she did not believe she could make it funny. She then suggested to Humphries that he perform the role himself.

== Stage and screen performances ==
=== 1950s–1999 ===
Humphries played the character at comedy clubs, satirising the atmosphere of 1950s Melbourne suburbia. An interview with "Mrs Everage" was one of the programmes screened on HSV-7's first day of programming in 1956. Another revue called Rock'n'Reel followed in 1958 at the New Theatre in Melbourne. She appeared in a televised revue shown on New Year's Eve, 1958, Wild Life and Christmas Belles.

The character's overseas debut, now as Edna Everage, was in the early 1960s at comedian Peter Cook's nightclub, The Establishment, in London's West End, where she received a poor review from Bamber Gascoigne, then the drama critic for The Spectator. Barry Humphries cites Cook as being instrumental in launching Edna's UK career. While her first appearances at the Establishment Club were a flop, the mousy Edna being too quiet to please that raucous crowd, a 2016 interviewer William Cook saw the early failure as a blessing, so that Humphries spent the sixties as a jobbing actor rather than as a pampered star.

In 1972, the character appeared as Barry McKenzie's "Aunt Edna" in the film, The Adventures of Barry McKenzie. In the sequel Barry McKenzie Holds His Own, the Australian Prime Minister Gough Whitlam cameos at the close of the film to confer upon Edna the title of Dame, henceforth to be known as "Dame Edna".

Following the lukewarm reception to Edna's early appearances in Humphries' 1969 stageshow Just a Show and the BBC television series The Barry Humphries Scandals, a growing awareness and appreciation among British audiences for Edna emerged and Humphries devised a stage show titled Edna Everage Housewife Superstar which was successfully presented in London's West End in the mid-1970s. The show featured monologues, songs and what was becoming an Edna trademark – interaction with the theatre audience.

In April 1976, Edna made an appearance in A Poke in the Eye (with a Sharp Stick) – the first of what became Amnesty International's Secret Policeman's Ball series of benefit shows. Edna performed a song for the show and was featured in the film of the show. She also appeared in the 1981 Amnesty show The Secret Policeman's Other Ball. Edna made a cameo appearance in the 1978 film Sgt. Pepper's Lonely Hearts Club Band. In 1979 she was the subject of a BBC Arena mockumentary: La Dame aux Gladiolas.

Humphries debuted the character off-Broadway in New York City in the late 1970s, but the show received such a poor review from The New York Times that Humphries later joked that he thought, "Well, I'll go back to Broadway but I'll wait till the critic's dead – and I had to wait 25 years. I had to wait a quarter of a century for that critic to die".

Dame Edna's success grew in the UK throughout the 1980s and early 1990s with semi-regular stage and television shows. Her first TV specials were in 1978–1979 on BBC, but she became popular with broadcaster ITV after her initial performance on An Audience With ... Dame Edna Everage in 1980, in front of an audience of invited celebrities. She went on to perform two more An Audience With... specials (in 1984 and 1988), the only performer ever to make three shows in the series.

In 1987, Edna starred alongside Humphries's vulgar alter-ego Les Patterson in the comedy feature Les Patterson Saves the World. In the same year The Dame Edna Experience, ostensibly a talk show which she described as "really a monologue interrupted by total strangers" aired, featuring high-profile "celebrity guests" such as Sean Connery, Mel Gibson, Joan Rivers, and Germaine Greer (an old friend of Humphries'), as well as Madge, her silent, sour-faced "bridesmaid and travelling companion". In 1989, the show was back for a second season, this time taking place in her "luxury penthouse suite" where her guests stayed and, in the case of Douglas Fairbanks, Jr, did her grocery shopping. Subsequently, these shows were aired in the U.S. on PBS, broadening her audience and enlarging her fame. Dame Edna's Neighbourhood Watch a reality/game show hybrid, aired in 1992, and saw her and Madge having a look at her "by invitation only, ladies audience" member's houses, and evaluating their housekeeping skills. U.S. television specials followed, as did an unsuccessful series which aired only one episode. She appeared as a guest of Phil Donahue on his talk show on 17 February 1993.

In 1997, she appeared in another television talk show Dr Dame Edna Kisses It Better. Edna continued her Australian stage and television appearances including a record five appearances as guest presenter at the TV Week Logie Awards and a role as a co-narrator (along with Humphries and Les Patterson) of the ABC's Australian social history series Barry Humphries Flashbacks in 1999.

=== 2000–2009 ===
In 1999–2000 and 2004–2005, Dame Edna appeared on Broadway and toured North America with both shows. These were ostensibly not "performances", but rather "appearances", with Dame Edna giving monologues and interacting with audience members. The former show, Dame Edna: The Royal Tour, won the Drama Desk Award for Outstanding One-Person Show and a Tony Award for Best Special Theatrical Event in 2000. The later show, Dame Edna: Back with a Vengeance, also received strong critical acclaim but did not capture major competitive Broadway awards like its predecessor.

In 2001 and 2002, Dame Edna appeared in the fifth season of the television show Ally McBeal as the guest character Claire Otoms, a client of the show's law firm who later became a secretary at the same firm. The character shared Dame Edna's voice and style and was explicitly listed in the opening credits as being played by Dame Edna Everage (although Barry Humphries received a credit in the closing credits). Claire Otoms is an anagram of "A Sitcom Role".

In the 2002 motion picture Nicholas Nickleby, Dame Edna plays Mrs. Crummles, an actress and the wife of the manager of a provincial theatre company. Barry Humphries also appears in the film as Mr. Leadville.

Dame Edna appeared at the Party at the Palace in London in 2002 where she referred to the Queen as the "jubilee girl".

The nostalgic "Barry Humphries: Back to my Roots" tour featured Humphries, Edna, Sir Les and Sandy Stone around Australia in 2003.

In 2002, New Zealand artist Maurice Bennett was commissioned by an Australian bread company to create a 7.35 m (24.1 ft) tall 2,989-slice toast portrait of Dame Edna. It was exhibited on a billboard in La Trobe Street in Melbourne.

In 2003, she gave an interview punctuated by NPR Weekend Edition host Scott Simon's table-pounding laughter.

The character celebrated her 50th "birthday" in 2005. She appeared in the 2005 Myer Christmas advert. To mark the occasion, in 2006, Australia Post featured Edna on a postage stamp and the Lord Mayor of Melbourne presented Edna with the key to the city. She toured Australia with the stageshow "Barry Humphries Back With a Vengeance" and appeared on camera "together" with Humphries for the first time in an interview by Ray Martin for Australia's 60 Minutes. She also appeared on screen at the Closing Ceremony of the 2006 Commonwealth Games in Melbourne while 1000 "Commonwealth Dames" danced around the arena wearing purple wigs, garish costumes and gladioli, singing along to her song, "We've Made The Most of Melbourne" : "It's not as small as Adelaide, Compared to Canberra, it's bliss, And if you've been to Melbourne, You can give Sydney a miss."

On 20 May 2006, she appeared on ITV's coverage of The Prince's Trust 30th Birthday Concert. During the telethon-style segments of the event, she took part in a game of Blind Date picking former X Factor contestant Chico Slimani over actors Roger Moore and Richard E Grant.

In the summer of 2006, Dame Edna appeared on The Tonight Show with Jay Leno alongside Billy Crystal. On 23 September 2006, during an interview on Parkinson, she revealed that she would be returning to ITV in 2007 with a new chat show called The Dame Edna Treatment. The show began on Saturday 17 March 2007, with the set-up being that Edna runs a health spa where various famous guests come for treatment.

On 17 December 2006, Dame Edna appeared as a guest panellist on the ABC TV Show Spicks and Specks where she sang with presenter Adam Hills. On 16 December 2007, she appeared as the last guest on the final episode of the Parkinson UK talk show. On 29 May 2008, she appeared on The Graham Norton Show alongside Ray Mears and Alanis Morissette. On 8 August 2008, she appeared on Loose Women on the final show of that year's series. On 12 September 2008, 15 December 2008, and 27 May 2009, she made guest appearances on The Tonight Show with Jay Leno.

Accompanied by her daughter Valmai in America and Sir Les Patterson in the UK, Dame Edna again toured with what was declared My First Last Tour. On television in early 2009, she appeared in adverts to publicise the insurance company Norwich Union's change of name to Aviva, quoting her change of name from Mrs Everage. On 9 June 2009, she appeared as a guest on The Late Late Show with Craig Ferguson. On 17 July 2009, she appeared as a guest on Friday Night with Jonathan Ross. On an episode of The One Show in September 2009, a piece of graffiti on Sunderland's Penshaw Monument read "Edna Woz Ere 09," and a pair of Everage's signature glasses were drawn next to it. Dame Edna performed the "Last Night of the Poms" at the Royal Albert Hall, accompanying the Royal Philharmonic Orchestra on 15 September 2009 and on 21 September, she appeared as a guest on Channel 4's "The Paul O'Grady Show".

=== 2010–2023 ===
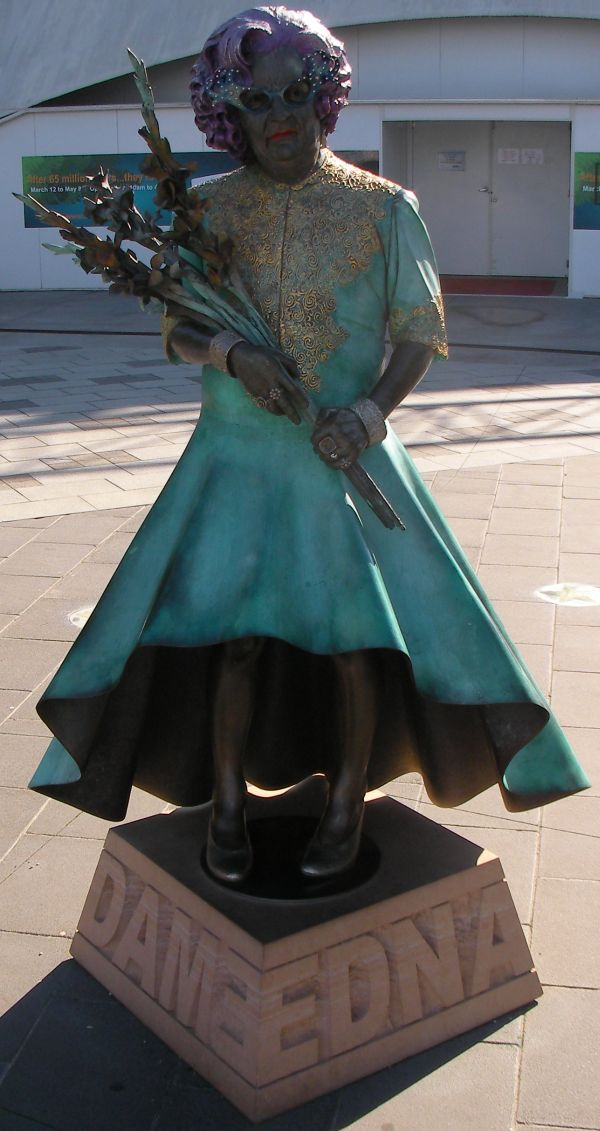
Bronze statue of Dame Edna at Waterfront City, Docklands, Melbourne

In 2010, Dame Edna collaborated with cabaret pianist and singer Michael Feinstein for a two-person revue in the United States, titled All About Me, based on the premise that the pair were rivals who were forced to work together for the show's sake. The show opened as the second production for the newly refurbished Henry Miller's Theatre and was planned to run from 18 March through 18 July 2010 (with previews beginning on 22 February), but lukewarm reviews and low ticket sales led to the limited engagement being cut short and closing on 4 April 2010, after 27 previews and 20 regular performances. On 25 March 2010, she appeared on the television talk show The View as a guest host to promote the production.

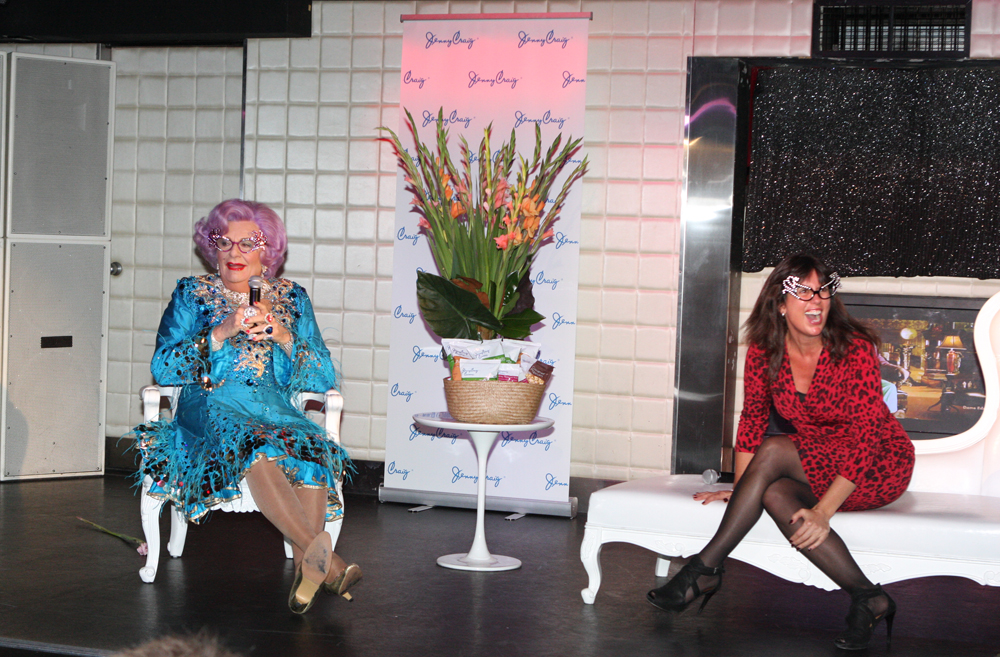
An intimate night with Dame Edna: New Jenny Craig ambassador performs at Civic Hotel, Sydney, 2012.

On 29 April 2011, she appeared on the Channel Nine broadcast William and Kate: The Royal Wedding, with Karl Stefanovic and Lisa Wilkinson, covering the wedding of Prince William and Catherine Middleton at Buckingham Palace, along with Tracy Grimshaw and Kathy Lette at Westminster Abbey.

On 18 March 2012, Humphries announced he would "retire" the Dame Edna character because he was "beginning to feel a bit senior".

On 15 March 2013, Dame Edna Everage appeared on Red Nose Day 2013 as a guest star and judge for the Comic Relief Does MasterChef competition between Jack Whitehall and Micky Flanagan.

In June 2013, Dame Edna returned in a Sydney Opera House production of Peter and the Wolf.

In 2013, Dame Edna announced her final tour of the United Kingdom. The show opened in November 2013 at the London Palladium before beginning a UK tour in January 2014.

On 11 February 2015, she appeared on The Great Comic Relief Bake Off in aid of Comic Relief.

Dame Edna's Glorious Goodbye – The Farewell Tour began in Seattle, Washington at The Moore Theatre (15–18 January 2015) and continued on to The Ahmanson Theatre in Los Angeles (24 January 2015 through 15 March 2015) next traveling to San Francisco's Orpheum Theater (17–22 March 2015) then on to the McCallum Theatre in Palm Desert, California (30 March 2015 – 4 April 2015) then Toronto, Ontario, Canada's Princess of Wales Theatre (9–19 April 2015) and concluding in Washington, D.C. at the National Theatre (21–26 April 2015.)

Dame Edna was a guest on Michael McIntyre's Big Christmas Show, broadcast by BBC1 on Christmas Day 2015.

Dame Edna appeared briefly in Absolutely Fabulous: The Movie (2016) in a non-speaking cameo, one of two characters played by Humphries in the film.

On 19 September 2019, Dame Edna appeared on the Today programme with John Humphrys. This was Humphry's final programme as presenter.

In what would become the final appearance of the character before Humphries' death, Dame Edna returned to the BBC for a one-off special, Dame Edna Rules The Waves, in which she (belatedly) publicly acknowledged the death of Madge, first broadcast on BBC1 on 31 December 2019. During the show, Dame Edna attempts to dispose of Madge's ashes from the porthole of her luxury yacht, The Ocean Widow, but is prevented from doing so to protect the environment. Madge's last will and testament insisted that Dame Edna take on the care of her sister Mabel, who became Dame Edna's silent sidekick, sticking labels on her celebrity guests. Mabel is portrayed by British actress Anne Rason.

== Discography ==
=== Albums ===
Title	Album details
The Dame Edna Party Experience	Released: 1989; Format: LP, CD; Label: Epic Records

=== Singles ===
List of singles, with Australian chart positions
Year	Title	Peak chart positions	Album
Year	Title	AUS	Album
1979	"Disco Matilda"	46	non album single
1988	"Theme From Neighbours"	-	The Dame Edna Party Experience

== Satirical advice column controversy ==
In 2003, Vanity Fair magazine invited Dame Edna to write a satirical advice column. She created controversy with a piece published in the February 2003 issue. Replying to a reader who asked if she should learn Spanish, she wrote:

"Forget Spanish. There's nothing in that language worth reading except Don Quixote, and a quick listen to the CD of Man of La Mancha will take care of that ... Who speaks it that you are really desperate to talk to? The help? Your leaf blower?"

Some Americans read this reply as a racist remark against Hispanics and complaints flooded in to the magazine. Actress Salma Hayek responded angrily, penning a furious letter in which she denounced Dame Edna. After Vanity Fair received death threats, the magazine published a full-page apology to the Hispanic community.

Humphries commented later: "If you have to explain satire to someone, you might as well give up". When Dame Edna was questioned about the controversy on the eve of her 2003 Australian tour, she retorted that Hayek's denunciation was due to "professional jealousy", and that Hayek was envious because the role of painter Frida Kahlo, for which Hayek received an Oscar nomination, had originally been offered to Edna:

When I was offered the part of Frida I turned it down, and she was the second choice. I said 'I'm not playing the role of a woman with a moustache and a monobrow, and I'm not having same-sex relations on the screen' ... I'm not racist. I love all races, particularly white people. You know, I even like Roman Catholics.

== Television credits ==
- Wild Life and Christmas Belles (1958)
- The Barry Humphries Show (1976–1977)
- La Dame Aux Gladiolas (1979)
- Christmas Snowtime Special (1979)
- An Audience with... (three editions, 1980, 1984, 1988)
- Last Night of the Poms (1981)
- An Aussie Audience with Dame Edna Everage (1986)
- The Dame Edna Experience (1987–1989)
- A Night on Mount Edna (1990)
- Dame Edna's Hollywood (1991–1993)
- Dame Edna's Neighbourhood Watch (1992–1993)
- Edna Time (1993)
- Dame Edna's Work Experience (1996)
- Dr Dame Edna Kisses It Better (1997)
- Flashbacks with Barry Humphries (1999)
- Ally McBeal (2001–2002)
- Dame Edna Live at the Palace (2003)
- The Dame Edna Treatment (2007)
- The Great Comic Relief Bake Off (2015)
- Dame Edna Rules The Waves (2019)

== See also ==
- Theatre of Australia

== Bibliography ==
- Lahr, John (1992). Dame Edna Everage and the Rise of Western Civilization; Backstage with Barry Humphries. United States: Farrar, Straus, Giroux. ISBN 0-374-13456-1.
- Everage, Dame Edna (1989). My Gorgeous Life. Australia: The Macmillan Company. ISBN 0-7329-0140-5.
