= The Dame Edna Treatment =

2007 British talk TV series

- Created by: Barry Humphries
- Presented by: Dame Edna Everage
- Starring: Sir Les Patterson
- Country of origin: United Kingdom
- Original language: English
- No. of series: 1
- No. of episodes: 7

Production
- Running time: 60 minutes (inc. adverts)
- Production company: Tiger Aspect Productions

Original release
- Network: ITV
- Release: 17 March – 30 June 2007

Related
- Dr Dame Edna Kisses It Better (1997)

The Dame Edna Treatment is a British talk show created by Barry Humphries and starring his fictional characters Dame Edna Everage and Sir Les Patterson. It aired on ITV at various times. The theme tune was written and performed by Robin Gibb. It was based upon the 1997 British talk show Dr Dame Edna Kisses It Better. It is set in Dame Edna's health-spa, where her celebrity guests have come for some "treatment". Viewing figures varied from 2.5m according to Digital Spy.

== Guests ==
Episode Number	Air Date	Seated Guests	Musical Guest	Les Patterson's Guest/Subject	Celebrity Cameos
1	17 March 2007	Mischa Barton, Sigourney Weaver	Michael Bolton	Shilpa Shetty/ Bollywood Dancing	Rowan Atkinson (as Mr. Bean), Patrick Stewart, Nancy Dell'Olio, Gillian McKeith
2	24 March 2007	Martin Sheen, Tracey Emin	Fergie	Carmen Electra/ Strip Aerobics	Ronnie Corbett, Ramon Estevez
3	31 March 2007	Amanda Holden, Alec Baldwin, Tim Allen	Engelbert Humperdinck	Amir Khan and Joe Calzaghe/ Boxing	Shane Richie, Mark Austin, Naomi Campbell (as housekeeping)
4	14 April 2007	Matt Lucas, David Walliams, Piers Morgan	Deborah Harry	David Ginola/ Prostate Exams	None
5	21 April 2007	Ian McShane, Susan Sarandon, Kimberly Stewart	Shirley Bassey	None	Richard O'Brien, Rod Stewart
6	28 April 2007	Boris Johnson, Alan Alda, Shane Warne	Sophie Ellis-Bextor	None	Jeff Stewart (as Reg Hollis) and Graham Cole (as Tony Stamp)
7	30 June 2007	Ivana Trump, James Nesbitt, k.d. lang	Robin Gibb	None	Jeffrey Archer

== Viewing Figures ==
Episode Number	Viewing Figures
1	3.5m, 17%
2	2.5m, 12%
3	2.2m, 12%
4	2.0m, 11%
5	2.0m, 11%
