= Sir Les Patterson =

- First appearance: January 1974, St. George leagues club, Sydney, Australia
- Created by: Barry Humphries
- Portrayed by: Barry Humphries
- Born: Taren Point, Southern Sydney

In-universe information
- Family: Gerard Patterson (brother); Lois (sister); Noreen (sister)
- Spouse: Gwenneth Lorraine Dolan
- Children: Craig and Karen
- Relatives: Leo (uncle); Ebenezer Patterson (ancestor)
- Religion: Christian (Roman Catholic)

Sir Leslie Colin Patterson is a fictional character created and portrayed by Australian comedian Barry Humphries. Patterson is obese, lecherous and offensive. His typical stage costume includes a tangle of hair, makeup suggesting an alcoholic's rosacea, grotesque teeth, a loud tie, a shirt covered with food stains, and padded pants that indicate an enormous penis.

== Character origins ==
By Humphries' own account, the character of Patterson first appeared in a one-man show that he performed at the St. George leagues club in Sydney in January 1974. Appearing in the guise of the boorish, loud-mouthed and uncultured Patterson, Humphries claimed to be that club's own entertainments officer as he introduced the next act, Dame Edna Everage. As Humphries recalled, "I understood later that many members of the audience thought Les was genuinely a club official, which says a lot for his charm and sincerity". Later that same year, the character (by now identified as Australia's cultural attaché to the Far East) was revived in a two-week cabaret appearance that Humphries performed at the Mandarin Hotel in Hong Kong. In Humphries' words, "The English merchant bankers and commodity brokers and Australian accountants there all recognised Les as someone they knew in the Australian diplomatic corps, and took him to their hearts." Patterson went on to play an even larger role in Humphries' next one-man show in London, Housewife, Superstar! (1976), delivering a lengthy monologue that was included on the original cast album.

Humphries (who gave up alcohol in the 1970s) said in 2016 that "in Les I can release my alcoholism". He found that of all his characters Sir Les caused the most offence Down Under, as Australians are "deeply conventional" and "like being bossed around".

== Stage, film and TV appearances ==
=== On stage ===
For more than 30 years, the character of Sir Les Patterson was a regular feature in Barry Humphries' solo theatrical appearances in Australia and the United Kingdom, during which he performed a monologue and frequently burst into song. Some of Patterson's specific monologues (as documented in the theatre programmes for Humphries' various shows) included the following:

- "The Yartz", from Isn't it Pathetic at His Age? (Australian tour, 1978–79) and A Night with Dame Edna; (UK tour, 1978–79)
- "Peter and the Shark", from The Last Night of the Poms (London, 1981) and Song of Australia (Melbourne and Sydney, 1983)
- "Les looking good", from An Evening's Intercourse with Barry Humphries (Australian tour, 1981; UK tour, 1982)
- "Les Patterson presents his broad-based package", from Tears Before Bedtime (Australian tour, 1985–86) and Back with a Vengeance (UK tour, 1987–88)
- "Les Patterson gets an Audience", from Look at Me When I'm Talking to You (Australian and UK tours, 1994–95)
- "Address to the nation", from Back to My Roots (and Other Suckers (Australian tour, 2003)
- "My Sacred Trust", from Back with a Vengeance: A New Effort (Australian tour, 2006–07)

During the Australian tour of Remember You're Out! (1999), it was stated that Patterson would not appear for fear of offending Humphries' more genteel fans; the character nevertheless made an appearance (as a scripted but seemingly unexpected gate crashing) during the show's second act.

In an effort to specifically satisfy fans of Les Patterson's earthy humour, Humphries performed two one-man shows entirely in Patterson's guise: one in London, entitled Les Patterson Rampant in Whitehall (June–July 1996) and another in New York, entitled Les Patterson Unzipped (Zipper Theater, 2 May 2005). The London performance was recorded and has since been released both as an audio tape and a video tape, under the title Live and Rampant: Les Patterson has a Stand-Up.

=== Film and television ===
On television, Patterson presented a documentary about the transfer of sovereignty over Hong Kong, entitled Sir Les and the Great Chinese Takeaway (1997). He has appeared as a special guest on the following:

- Another Audience with Dame Edna Everage (1984)
- Dame Edna's Christmas Experience (1987)
- The Dame Edna Satellite Experience (1989)
- A Late Lunch with Les (1991)
- Les Patterson and the Great Chinese Takeaway (1997)
- Barry Humphries' Flashbacks (1999)
- Aussies: Who Gives a XXXX (2001)
- The Dame Edna Treatment (five episodes, 2007).

Barry Humphries was interviewed in Patterson's guise on numerous TV talk shows, including Parkinson (1982), Clive James, Clive Anderson's All Talk (1995), The Panel (2003) and Rove Live (2005).

In 1987, Sir Les Patterson was the basis of an ambitious full-length feature film, Les Patterson Saves the World, which was a critical and commercial failure.

== Other appearances in character ==
=== Personal appearances ===
In 1983, the Cambridge Union Society held a spoof ceremony in which they purported to award Les Patterson an honorary Doctorate of Letters. This reportedly caused some anxiety amongst Cambridge dons, who were worried that the public might mistakenly believe that Cambridge University had awarded the degree to Sir Les. The Cambridge Union is not chartered as a degree awarding body.

In 1986, Humphries as Patterson was awarded the Douglas Wilkie Medal for doing the least for football in the best and fairest manner. His dislike for the game of Australian rules football was illustrated when he coated a leather football in cream cake, and fed it to a camel.

=== Depictions in art ===
In 1999, expatriate Australian photographer Polly Borland created a memorable image of Sir Les Patterson (seated on a toilet, waving an Australian flag) as part of a series entitled Australians, which was exhibited at the respective National Portrait Galleries in London (2000) and Canberra (2001).

In 2000, a portrait of Humphries as Patterson by painter Bill Leak won the Packing Room Prize at the Archibald Prize. In 2014, Tim Storrier's full-length painting, The Member, Dr Sir Leslie Colin Patterson KCB AO, also won the Packing Room Prize.

== Fictional biography ==
=== Early life and education ===
Sir Leslie Colin Patterson KBE, AO, was born on 1 April 1942, in Taren Point, Southern Sydney. In later life, he claimed descent from a certain Ebenezer Patterson, who had been sent to Australia as a convict in the nineteenth century. Little is known of Patterson's present-day family beyond from the fact that he has a sister whose name is either Lois or Noreen (sources differ) and a brother named Gerard, who became a clergyman and later served as an Advisor on Religious Affairs to the Lord Howe Island Chamber of Commerce. In a brief memoir published in 2006, Father Gerard Patterson described his brother Les as "the archetypical Australian scallywag", who had been their mother's favourite. Father Patterson further recalled that his brother had a "rough and ready education". Through the influence of their uncle Leo, both brothers were sent to Melbourne to attend the prestigious Xavier College, although Les remained there for only 1½ terms. Returning to Sydney, he attended Our Lady of Dolours' Boys School and completed his Intermediate Certificate at Parramatta High School.

Patterson commenced tertiary study at the Kogarah TAFE. Prior to his appointment as Cultural Attaché, he completed what he described as a "five-day crash course in World Culture" at the University of Sydney. Only a few years later, he would receive an honorary doctorate in Australian Studies.

=== Personal life ===
Although Father Gerard Patterson noted that he and Les had "drifted apart" after he had entered the priesthood, he would later officiate at his brother's wedding to Gwenneth Lorraine Dolan, a former hand model. She was a film buff who enjoyed Disney films and, by Sir Les' own account, they had met at a matinée screening of Fantasia. They subsequently had two children, Karen and Craig. Members of the Patterson family have occasionally assisted Sir Les in his business ventures. When he founded the Thursday Island Film Commission in 1978, his wife Lady Gwenneth was appointed as director, his daughter Karen as secretary, and his sister Lois as creative liaison co-ordinator. According to Father Gerard Patterson, Karen later took a position at Our Lady of Dolours School for Ridiculously Slow Learners, in South Sydney, while her brother Craig was employed for the Australian Wheat Board, where, in 2008, his work had "recently attracted unfair publicity".

In various published sources, Les Patterson listed his hobbies as "pocket billiards and sauna construction in Thailand" (according to a 1995 programme bio) and "wine tasting and infidelity" (according to a 2005 CV).

=== Professional life ===
Over a career of more than four decades, Sir Les Patterson held numerous positions in the public and private sector, including the following:

- Employee in the Office of Custom and Excise (Literature Division) (1960s)
- Minister for Shark Conservation (1960s)
- Minister for Drought under the Gough Whitlam administration (early 1970s)
- Cultural Attaché to the Far East (1974)
- Cultural Attaché to the Court of St James's (1975–76)
- Minister for Inland Drainage and Rodent Control
- Chairman and Treasurer of the Thursday Island Film Commission (by 1978)
- Member of the Government Select Committee into the High Incidence of Transvestism in the Yartz (arts) (by 1978)
- Chairman of the Australian Cheese Board (by 1978)
- Chairman of the Australian Chapter of the International Cheese Board (by 1985)
- Chairman of the Australian Fillum Facility (by 1985)
- Emeritus Vice-Chancellor of the London School of Australian Studies (by 1985)
- Founder of the Sir Les Patterson School of Etiquette (by 1993)
- Food and Beverage consultant, Sydney Institute (by 2003)
- Etiquette and protocol advisor to the Australian Federal Government (by 2003)
- Member of Australian Peacekeeping Mission to Baghdad (by 2003)
- Cultural ambassador to the United States (by 2005)
- Minister for Sport with special responsibility to keep sports rampantly heterosexual and "blokey"
- Minister for the "Yartz"

== Published works ==
From the 1970s onwards, Barry Humphries released a number of books and recordings under the guise of Sir Les Patterson.

=== Books ===
- Les Patterson's Australia, Melbourne: Sun Books, 1978.
- The Traveller's Tool, London: Michael O'Mara Books Ltd, 1985.
- The Enlarged and Extended Tool, (reported to be 'in preparation', 2005)

=== Filmography ===
- Live and Rampant: Les Patterson has a Stand Up (1996)
- Les Patterson Saves the World (1987)

=== Discography ===
==== Albums ====
List of albums, with Australian chart positions
Title	Album details	Peak chart positions
Title	Album details	AUS
12 Inches of Les	Released: 1985; Format: LP, cassette; Label: Liberation Records (LIB 5064)	77
Live and Rampant: Les Patterson Has a Standup	Released: 1996; Format: CD, cassette; Label: Music Collection International (GAGMC053)	–
Les is More: Diplomatic Ditties for the Dysfunctional Family	Released: 2003; Format: CD; Label: Tamarin Records (TAM204)	–

==== Singles ====
Year	Title
1985	"Give Her One for Christmas "
1987	"G'Day"

==== Appearances on other recordings ====
- Song of Australia: An Educational Sonorama (original 1983 Australian cast); Bilarm Music BAC26 (2006)
- Barry Humphries: Dada Days (Moonee Ponds Muse Volume 2; Raven Records RVCD-34 (1993)
- The Dame Edna Party Experience; Epic Records 463235 1 (1988)
- World Expo 88: The Songs; EMI Records, EMP 8801 (1988)
- LP: The Les Patterson Long Player (music and dialogue from Les Patterson Saves The World); WEA Records 254779.1 (1987)
- Dame Edna Everage: The Last Night of the Poms; EMI Records EMC2742/3 (1981)
- Barry Humphries presents Housewife Superstar! (original London cast); Charisma Records 9124 004 (1976)
