= List of Columbia University Graduate School of Journalism people =

Following is a list of notable alumni and faculty of the Columbia University Graduate School of Journalism, a graduate school of the American Columbia University, located in New York City, New York.

== A–G ==
- Adamu Adamu, minister of education in Nigeria
- Margot Adler, anchor, National Public Radio
- Ebenezer Ako-Adjei, Ghanaian politician; a founding father of Ghana; member of the Big Six
- Daniel Arnall, executive producer for news, Bloomberg Television; former senior producer for business coverage, ABC News
- Amotz Asa-El, senior commentator, former executive editor, Jerusalem Post
- Spencer Bailey, editor-in-chief, Surface
- Russ Baker, investigative reporter, founder of the Real News Project and editor-in-chief of whowhatwhy.org
- David W. Ball, novelist and short-story writer
- Wayne Barrett, senior editor and investigative reporter, Village Voice
- Ralph Begleiter, distinguished journalist in residence, University of Delaware
- Elizabeth Benjamin, political reporter, Daily News
- Robert Henry Best, propagandist for Nazi Germany
- Ryan Blitstein, freelance business reporter
- Louis Boccardi, retired CEO, Associated Press; Freedom Forum Foundation
- Geraldine Brooks, Pulitzer Prize-winning novelist
- Pat Buchanan, Republican party strategist, presidential advisor, presidential candidate, conservative columnist, television commentator
- Elizabeth Bumiller, correspondent, The New York Times
- Greg Burke, senior communications adviser with Vatican's Secretariat of State (2012–)
- Marcy Burstiner, professor of journalism
- Robert Campbell, architect and journalist; former architecture critic, The Boston Globe
- Bennett Cerf, co-founder of Random House (deceased)
- Selina Cheng, chair of the Hong Kong Journalists Association
- David Cho, journalist for The Washington Post
- Gina Chua, executive editor, Reuters
- Leah Hager Cohen, writer, formerly of Houghton Mifflin
- Lisa R. Cohen, Emmy-winning television producer, author
- Richard Cohen, former reporter and columnist, Washington Post
- Sheila Coronel, academic dean at Columbia Journalism School; winner of the 2003 Magsaysay Award for Journalism, Literature and the Creative Communication Arts
- Judith Crist, film and television critic; professor, Columbia Graduate School of Journalism
- May Cutler, publisher, founder of Tundra Books; first Canadian woman to publish children's books; first woman to serve as mayor of Westmount, Quebec
- Sadanand Dhume, author
- Jonathan Dunn-Rankin, actor, television journalist and gay activist
- Barkha Dutt, former managing director, NDTV 24/7, India
- Yashica Dutt, writer
- Jim Dwyer, reporter, The New York Times
- Thomas Byrne Edsall, Joseph Pulitzer II and Edith Pulitzer Moore Professor, Columbia School of Journalism 2006–2014; The Washington Post; contributing op-ed writer, The New York Times
- Eromo Egbejule, foreign correspondent for The Guardian, former editor for Al Jazeera
- Alan Ehrenhalt, senior editor for Governing, contributing writer to The New York Times
- Lolis Eric Elie, journalist, documentary filmmaker; Columbia Graduate School of Journalism "2012 Alumnus of the Year"
- Helen Epstein, arts journalist, author Children of the Holocaust and nine other non-fiction books
- Aatos Erkko, Finnish publishing magnate, owner of Sanoma Corporation, son of foreign minister Eljas Erkko
- Stephan Faris, freelance journalist, has written from Africa and Middle East, primarily for Time magazine
- Howard Fineman, editorial director and reporter for The Huffington Post; MSNBC contributor
- Rob Fishman, co-founder of Niche, a company acquired by Twitter
- Cardinal John P. Foley, Grand Master of the Order of the Holy Sepulchre
- Scottie McKenzie Frasier, author, newspaper editor, suffragist
- Robert Giles, curator, The Nieman Foundation for Journalism at Harvard University
- David Gonzalez, journalist, The New York Times
- John M. Goshko, M.A., journalist for The Washington Post
- Ellen Louise Graham, journalist at the Wall Street Journal and 1999 Pulitzer Prize finalist
- Mel Gussow, former theatre critic, The New York Times (deceased)

== H–M ==
- LynNell Hancock, education writer; professor, Columbia Graduate School of Journalism
- Donna Hanover, co-host, WOR radio morning show; ex-wife of Rudy Giuliani
- Elizabeth Hansen Shapiro, senior research fellow at the school's Tow Center; co-founder of the National Trust for Local News
- Jonathan Harounoff, journalist and Israel's international spokesperson to the United Nations
- Hy Hollinger, entertainment trade editor and journalist (The Hollywood Reporter, Variety)
- Alice Hughes, journalist and syndicated fashion columnist
- Jessica Huseman, editorial director of Votebeat
- Molly Ivins, reporter, author and syndicated political columnist
- Joseph Jackson, assistant drama editor at The New York World and Hollywood screenwriter
- Paul Janensch, former executive editor of The Courier-Journal
- Nigel Jaquiss, Pulitzer Prize-winning investigative reporter for Willamette Week
- Michelle Johnson, journalist, The Boston Globe
- Soterios Johnson, host of NPR’s Morning Edition on WNYC
- Mary Jordan, Pulitzer Prize-winning journalist for the Washington Post
- Vinod Jose, former executive editor 2009–2023, The Caravan
- Kwame Karikari, Ghanaian journalist and academic; director general of Ghana Broadcasting Corporation (1982–1984)
- Frederick Kempe, president and chief executive officer, Atlantic Council of the United States
- Peter Kihss, journalist at The New York Times
- Philip Klein
- Steve Kroft, journalist, 60 Minutes
- Madeleine M. Kunin, former governor of Vermont; Marsh scholar-professor at large, University of Vermont; founder of Institute for Sustainable Communities
- Howard Kurtz, media reporter, The Washington Post; host of CNN's "Reliable Sources"
- Erik Larson, author of The Devil in the White City; contributor, Time magazine; 2004 Edgar Award; finalist for National Book Award
- Bernard Le Grelle, Belgian investigative journalist, political adviser, author, former United Nations expert and public affairs executive
- Joseph Lelyveld, former executive editor and columnist, The New York Times; Pulitzer Prize-winning journalist and author
- Juanita León, Colombian journalist; and founder, La Silla Vacía website
- Paul Leventhal (1938–2007), journalist and nuclear nonproliferation expert
- Flora Lewis, foreign-affairs columnist, The New York Times (deceased)
- Bill Lichtenstein, Peabody Award-winning print and broadcast journalist and documentary producer and president, Lichtenstein Creative Media
- A. J. Liebling, journalist closely associated with The New Yorker from 1935 until his death
- Kathryn Lilley, mystery writer
- Samuel Lubell, journalist, pollster, and political commentator; National Book Award for Nonfiction finalist (1957)
- Robert L. Lynn, president of Louisiana College 1975–1997; former journalist
- Andrea Mackris, CNN producer
- Suzanne Malveaux, White House correspondent, CNN
- Gabriele Marcotti, sports writer
- Mark Mathabane, writer and lecturer
- Eileen McNamara, Pulitzer Prize-winning columnist, The Boston Globe; professor of journalism at Brandeis University
- John McWethy, former national security correspondent, ABC News (deceased)
- Andrew Meldrum, South African correspondent, The Guardian and The Observer
- Carol Marbin Miller, senior investigative reporter, The Miami Herald
- Janice Min, media executive, oversees Billboard and The Hollywood Reporter, former editor of Us Weekly
- Michele Montas, spokesperson, United Nations Secretary-General Ban Ki-moon; formerly with Radio Haiti
- Alfred de Montesquiou, reporter, laureate of the French Prix Albert Londres, documentary film director
- Walt Mossberg, executive editor, The Verge and co-founder, Re/code
- Ali Mustafa, broadcast journalist, CNBC 2005–2006, Dawn News TV 2006–2009

== N–Z ==
- Alanna Nash, journalist and biographer; Society of Professional Journalists' 1994 National Member of the Year
- Viveca Novak, Washington correspondent for Time; frequent guest on CNN, NBC, PBS, and Fox
- Timothy L. O'Brien, editor, The New York Times' Sunday Business section; has written for The Wall Street Journal
- Mirta Ojito, contributor, The New York Times; Pulitzer Prize winner for National Reporting in 2001; professor, Columbia Graduate School of Journalism
- Rita Omokha, award-winning journalist and author; adjunct professor, Columbia Graduate School of Journalism
- Frederick C. Painton, pulp-fiction author, WWII war correspondent
- Ralph Judson Palmer, California newspaper publisher
- Malini Parthasarathy, former editor, The Hindu
- Natalie Pawelski, journalist and television correspondent
- Basharat Peer, Kashmiri-American journalist, script writer, author, and political commentator; author, Curfewed Night
- Gabe Pressman (1924–2017), long-time New York City reporter
- John Quiñones, ABC News host and correspondent
- Narasimhan Ram, editor-in-chief, The Hindu
- Zoe Ramushu, South Africa-based Zimbabwean writer, director, producer
- Gianni Riotta, editor-in-chief of Il Sole 24 Ore, former editor in chief of TG1 (RAI)
- Geraldo Rivera, television reporter and talk show host
- Manuel Rivera-Ortiz, documentary photographer
- Tanya Rivero, anchor, ABC News Now
- B. H. "Johnny" Rogers, former member of both houses of Louisiana State Legislature, faculty member at LSU (deceased)
- Gloria Rojas, television journalist
- James Rosen, journalist and novelist
- Tom Rosenstiel, director, Project for Excellence in Journalism
- Saskia de Rothschild, journalist, director of the Chateau Lafite Rothschild
- Wendy Ruderman, journalist, 2010 Pulitzer Prize for Investigative Reporting
- Christine Sadler (1902–1983), author, journalist, magazine editor
- Dick Schaap (September 27, 1934 – December 21, 2001), sports journalist, author
- Andre Sennwald, New York Times motion picture critic (deceased)
- Evelyn Sharp, real estate businesswoman who owned the Beverly Wilshire Hotel
- Gail Sheehy (November 27, 1936 – August 24, 2020), author
- Howard Simons, former curator of the Nieman Foundation for Journalism
- Allan Sloan, columnist and editor-at-large, Fortune Magazine
- Craig S. Smith, Shanghai bureau director of The New York Times and managing director for China
- Olivia Smith, Emmy award-winning journalist
- Sreenath Sreenivasan, professor, Columbia Graduate School of Journalism; technology reporter
- Guy Sterling, journalist and The Star Ledger and historian of Newark, NJ
- Alexander Stille, author; contributor, New York Magazine; San Paolo Professor of International Journalism at Columbia University
- Ron Suskind, author and investigative journalist; former reporter, The Wall Street Journal; Pulitzer Prize winner for Feature Writing in 1995
- Tara Sutton, reporter, filmmaker
- Kosuke Takahashi, journalist, television commentator and former editor-in-chief of The Huffington Post Japan
- Mariana van Zeller, Peabody Award-winning television journalist
- Robert Whitcomb, newspaperman, author
- Emil Wilbekin, author; former editor-in-chief of Vibe and Giant, and editor-at-large of Essence magazine, founder of Native Son Now, Black & gay rights activist
- Doris Willens, journalist, playwright and folk singer in the Baby Sitters
- Valerie Wilson Wesley, author; former executive editor, Essence magazine
- Emily Witt, author, contributor to The New Yorker
- Wayne Worcester, crime novelist; professor of journalism, University of Connecticut
- Paula Yoo, children's and young adult author, journalist and screenwriter

== See also ==
- List of Columbia University people
