= Pu Zhiqiang =

Chinese civil rights lawyer (born 1965)

Pu Zhiqiang 浦志强
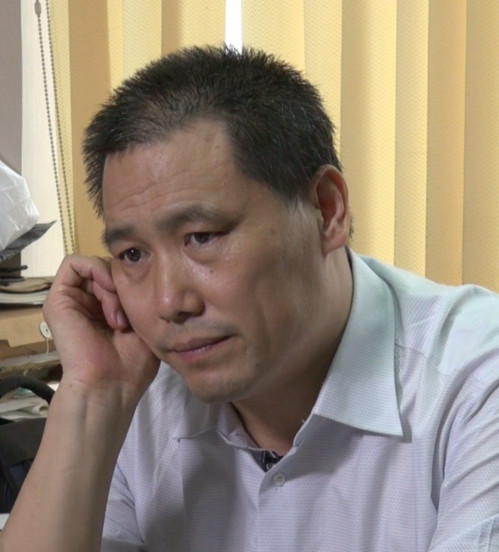
- Pu in 2013
- Born: 17 January 1965 (age 61); Luan County, Tangshan, Hebei Province, China
- Education: China University of Political Science and Law (LLM)
- Alma mater: Nankai University
- Occupation: Attorney
- Known for: Human rights advocacy
- Movement: Weiquan movement
- Criminal charges: Incitement of ethnic hatred, "picking quarrels and provoking trouble"
- Criminal penalty: Imprisonment (3 years, suspended)
- Awards: Global Freedom of Expression Prize (2016)

Pu Zhiqiang
- Simplified Chinese: 浦志强
- Traditional Chinese: 浦志強
Transcriptions
Standard Mandarin
- Hanyu Pinyin: Pǔ Zhìqiáng

Pu Zhiqiang (born 17 January 1965) is a Chinese civil rights lawyer who specialises in press freedom, defamation, and product safety, and other issues. Based in Beijing, he is an executive partner of the Huayi Law Firm. Pu is known for being a prominent member of the Weiquan movement, having advocated for writers and journalists in a number of high-profile cases. Due to the nature of the cases he has taken on and his criticism of official Chinese policies, Pu's actions are monitored by the Chinese state security services, and he has been detained and questioned on several occasions.

== Biography ==
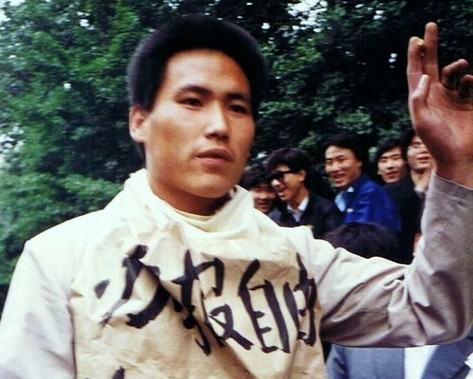
Pu at the 1989 Tiananmen Square protests

From Luanzhou, Tangshan, Hebei Province, Pu Zhiqiang received an undergraduate degree in history from Nankai University in 1986, and a Master of Laws degree from China University of Political Science and Law in 1991. When he was a postgraduate student, he joined the pro-democracy movement in 1989. Writing for the New York Review of Books, Pu described how he returns to the Square annually with friends and family to mark the anniversary of the crackdown in fulfillment of a promise he made in 1989.

Pu is known for being a prolific blogger on the Weibo platform, and for his "casual sarcasm." His posts are characterised by NYRB as "short, Twitter-like" and are "unusual for their cleverness." He is well known as a human rights activist, and his blogging has tested the boundaries of Chinese government censorship. He has tens of thousands of followers. However, once his Weibo accounts reach a certain level of popularity, censors delete his account, and he has to start again.

== Advocacy ==
Pu has been involved in a number of high-profile freedom of speech cases in China, defending dissident writers and journalists. In 2004, he defended writers Chen Guidi and Wu Chuntao. The couple was facing libel charges for their portrayals of local Communist Party official Zhang Xide in their best-selling book A Survey of the Chinese Peasants. The case—and Pu's litigation in court—garnered international attention. Philip Pan of the Washington Post wrote that "by the time [Pu] finished his cross-examination, the mood in the courtroom had begun to change. When the trial ended three days later, ... it seemed as if Zhang – and the Communist Party itself – were the ones on trial." The same year, Pu won a landmark victory on behalf of the China Reform magazine, which was similarly facing libel charges for its critical reporting on a real estate developer. The court decided in the magazine's favor, ruling that journalists are entitled to legal immunity on the condition that their stories are based on a reasonably believable source, rather than hearsay or fabrication.

In 2006, Pu represented dissident writer Wang Tiancheng, who charged that legal professor Zhou Yezhong had plagiarised over 5,000 words of his writings without attribution. Although the court recognized that plagiarism had occurred, it ultimately ruled that the copied material represented too small a portion of the Zhou's book to constitute a crime. Pu told the South China Morning Post that he believed the court's decision may have been politically motivated. In 2009, Pu represented Tan Zuoren, who documented deaths that occurred as a result of the 2008 Sichuan earthquake.

In 2012, Pu represented artist Ai Weiwei when his company sued the Beijing tax authority. That same year, he also represented Tang Hui, who had been sent to a labor camp for peacefully petitioning against the sentences given to the people who raped her 11-year-old daughter, and then forced her into prostitution. Tang, who repeatedly petitioned officials in Yongzhou in her daughter's case, was eventually sentenced to 18 months in "re-education through labor" for "seriously disturbing the social order and exerting a negative impact on society." Tang's sentence sparked calls for the abolition of the supposed system of re-education through labor. Pu was one of three lawyers who defended Fang Hong, a dissident blogger who had been sentenced to one year in a labor camp for writing a poem mocking former Chongqing Communist Party chief Bo Xilai. After Bo's fall from power over a corruption scandal, Fang filed to have his guilty verdict overturned. He also sought compensation from the court.

Pu contends that the display of Mao Zedong's preserved remains at Chairman Mao Memorial Hall is a moral and legal violation of Mao's expressed wish for frugal socialist funeral.

== 2014 arrest ==
Pu was arrested by the Chinese police in May 2014, ostensibly for having "caused a disturbance." The arrest followed Pu's attendance at a meeting of dissidents who were campaigning for official recognition of the Tiananmen Square protests of 1989. Four other lawyers who attended the event were also jailed. The prosecution examined his personal history, notes and computers, and interrogated his associates, but failed to find any evidence of treason, sexual misconduct, or corruption. The only evidence provided by the prosecution consisted of provocative blog posts. He remained in custody despite the courts having rejected the case for lack of evidence.

A statement released by the American foreign ministry on 6 May 2015 asked that Pu be released, saying that this was in accordance "with China's international human rights commitments." Chinese foreign ministry spokeswoman Hua Chunying responded the next day, saying that "I think lots of people have the same feeling with me, that some people in the United States have hearts that are too big and hands that are too long. Washington should address human rights problems at home and stop trying to be the world's policeman or judge."

In December 2015, Pu was put on trial in Beijing for online social commentary critical of the ruling Communist Party. On 22 December 2015, Pu was found guilty of picking quarrels and inciting ethnic hatred and given a suspended three-year prison sentence. Pu reported that he had been disbarred in April 2016, due to his postings on social media.

Pu was nominated by an international group of writers, scholars, activists and legal observers for the 2016 Global Freedom of Expression Prize sponsored by the Columbia University Global Freedom of Expression Center.
