= Devin Dwyer =

American digital reporter and television journalist

Devin Patrick Dwyer
- Education: Dartmouth College Columbia University Graduate School of Journalism
- Occupation: Journalist
- Writing career
- Genre: Non-fiction

Devin Patrick Dwyer (born 1982/1983) is an American television journalist and digital reporter. He is ABC News' senior Washington reporter and leads network coverage of the U.S. Supreme Court. He has covered policy, politics and legal affairs at the network since 2009. He was the network's off-air reporter on President Obama's re-election campaign in 2012.

== Early life and education ==
A native of Minneapolis, Minnesota, Dwyer, the son of Robert Dwyer Jr. and Anne Wilwerding, graduated from Dartmouth College and Columbia University Graduate School of Journalism.

== Career ==
Prior to a career in journalism, Dwyer was a high school social studies instructor and distance running coach in Atlanta. He got his start as a reporter at Georgia Public Broadcasting.

He joined ABC News in 2009 after several years as a public radio reporter and producer in Atlanta, Georgia, and in New York City. His feature radio and video stories have aired on NPR, American Public Media, PBS and Frontline.

Dwyer is a regular contributor to ABC News Live, GMA3, Good Morning America, ABC World News, Nightline, and ABCNews.com.

== Personal life ==
Dwyer married his husband, Adam Joseph Ciarleglio, on July 3, 2016.

== See also ==
- List of people from Minneapolis
- List of Columbia University Graduate School of Journalism people
- List of Dartmouth College alumni
- List of television reporters
