= Philip Pan =

American journalist and author

Philip P. Pan
- Born: New Jersey, U.S.
- Education: Harvard University (AB)
- Occupations: Journalist and author
- Employer: The New York Times

Philip P. Pan (born c. 1973) is an American journalist, author, and International Editor at The New York Times. He previously worked as bureau chief in Moscow and Beijing for The Washington Post.

== Early life and education ==
Pan was born and raised in New Jersey to immigrant parents from Taiwan. He attended Harvard University, where he studied government and was managing editor of The Harvard Crimson. He graduated from Harvard in 1995. While a student, he freelanced for The Boston Globe, and interned with the Los Angeles Times, Atlanta Journal-Constitution and The Jersey Journal.

== Career ==
He won the Arthur Ross Book Award Gold Medal in 2009 for his bestselling book about political change in modern China, Out of Mao's Shadow: The Struggle for the Soul of a New China, which was also named a Best Book of 2008 by The Washington Post and The Economist. The New York Times literary critic Michiko Kakutani wrote that the book possessed "both the immediacy of first-rate reportage and the emotional depth of field of a novel".

Pan was formerly a reporter for The Washington Post and headed its Beijing and Moscow bureaus. He also received the 2002 Livingston Award for International Reporting for his articles about labor conditions in China, and an Overseas Press Club award and the Osborn Elliott Prize for Excellence in Journalism on Asia for stories about Chinese-style authoritarianism. He started his career working at the Post's Metro Desk "covering crime, education and immigration policy." He joined The Washington Post's Beijing bureau in 2000.

Pan's book profiles a dozen individuals caught in the struggle over China's political future, including a filmmaker trying to uncover the truth about the execution of a young woman named Lin Zhao during the Cultural Revolution, an elderly surgeon named Jiang Yanyong who blew the whistle on China's cover-up of the epidemic of severe acute respiratory syndrome, and a blind rural activist named Chen Guangcheng who was jailed after trying to stop a campaign of forced abortion and sterilization in his village. Other topics covered by his book include China's shourong detention system, investigative journalism in China, and the publication and reception of An Investigation of China's Peasantry, by Chen Guidi and Wu Chuntao, which was later released as Will the Boat Sink the Water (2006) in its English translation.

=== The New York Times ===
After leaving The Post, Pan joined The New York Times as Beijing bureau chief and assistant foreign editor in 2011 He helped launch the newspaper's Chinese-language website, its first online edition in a foreign language. On September 22, 2022, The New York Times announced Pan as its International Editor.

In April 2024, an article from The Intercept revealed that Pan, along with The New York Times standards editor Susan Wessling, had written an internal memo instructing The New York Times journalists covering the Gaza war to restrict from using terms like "genocide" and "ethnic cleansing" and to "avoid" using the phrase "occupied territory" when describing Palestinian land.

== Personal life ==
Pan is married. He has a son.

== See also ==
- List of American print journalists
- List of Harvard University people
- List of non-fiction writers
- Lists of American writers
