= Daniel Herrera =

Daniel Herrera may refer to:

- Danny Herrera (musician) (born 1969), American drummer with Napalm Death and Anaal Nathrakh
- Danny Herrera (strongman) (1937–2008), American powerlifter
- Daniel Herrera (baseball) (born 1984), American Major League Baseball
- Daniel Herrera (rugby union) (born 1963), Uruguayan rugby union coach
- Daniel Rendón Herrera, Colombian drug lord
- Daniel (Chino) Herrera, Mexican comedian and actor
