= Janensch =

Janensch is a German surname. Notable people with the surname include:

- Gerhard Janensch (1860–1933), German sculptor
- Paul Janensch (born 1938), American journalist
- Werner Janensch (1878–1969), German paleontologist and geologist
