= Week in Review =

Week in Review may refer to:

- New York Week in Review, television program focused on New York State politics
- Washington Week, television program formerly known as Washington Week in Review
- Indiana Week in Review, program on Indiana PBS station WFYI (TV)
- Rush Limbaugh Week in Review, weekend edition of The Rush Limbaugh Show
- Sunday Week in Review, section of New York Times newspaper
- Week in Review, Friday feature of PBS television program A Place of Our Own
- Week in Review (Newsweek in Review), weekend edition of precursor of CBS Evening News
- Week in Review, weekend edition of syndicated radio talk program First Light (radio)
- Week in Review, feature of ESPN.com's SportsNation section
- Week in Review, feature of The Nassau Weekly newspaper
