= Will the Boat Sink the Water =

Book by Chen Guidi and Wu Chuntao

Will the Boat Sink the Water? The Life of China's Peasants
- Author: Chen Guidi and Wu Chuntao
- Translator: Zhu Hong
- Language: Chinese
- Publisher: (Eng. trans.) PublicAffairs
- Publication date: January 2004
- Publication place: China
- English publication date: June 2006
- Media type: Print (hardback & paperback)
- Pages: 256 pp (Eng. trans. edition)
- ISBN: 978-1586483586

Will the Boat Sink the Water? The Life of China's Peasants is a 2006 non-fiction book authored by husband and wife team Chen Guidi and Wu Chuntao. It is the English translation of Zhongguo Nongmin Diaocha (中国农民调查, "An Investigation of Chinese Peasants"), published in Chinese in 2004.

The book features four cases of villages where there was excessive extraction of taxes and the like by local CCP cadres and peasant protest in response to this, in the poorer parts of predominantly rural Anhui province. It then provides a more analytical discussion of the historical background and the institutional sources of the conflicts between the local CCP leadership and the peasantry.

== Publication history ==
Excerpts of the Chinese-language edition of "An Investigation of Chinese Peasants" was published in late 2003 in China, selling roughly 100,000 copies. When the full-length publication was released in January 2004, it sold nearly 200,000 copies in under two months. In March 2004, the book was banned in the People’s Republic of China. Despite the ban, it became an "underground mega-bestseller", according to the Asia Times, selling more than 7 million unlicensed copies as of 2005. Copies of the book can reportedly be found in some of China's bookshops for 22 yuan (US$2.65).

== Reception ==
Will the Boat Sink the Water garnered favorable reviews, and was the recipient of the 2004 Lettre Ulysses Award.

== Impact ==
An Investigation of Chinese Peasants had a considerable impact within mainland China. According to Joseph Kahn of the New York Times, it "stirred consciousness of how the country’s fantastic economic growth had left behind the roughly two-thirds of the Chinese people who are still tied, directly or indirectly, to the land." A reviewer with the Chinese Academy of Social Sciences describe the book as an "alarm bell," speaking to the state of Chinese society as a whole. Chinese Premier Wen Jiabao, known for his populist policies oriented towards easing the rural-urban divide, reportedly keeps a copy of the book on his bedside table, according to a top adviser. Under the rule of Hu Jintao and Wen Jiabao, policies were implemented to ease some of the sources of discontent in rural China. Notably, Wen Jiaobao abolished the main agricultural tax. Joseph Kahn suggests that Chen and Wu's book may deserve some credit for these policies.

== Libel trial ==
Soon after the book's publication, local Communist Party official Zhang Xide sued Chen and Wu for libel, seeking 200,000 yuan in damages. Zhang had been described in the book as unpopular, corrupt, and oppressive towards petitioners and peasants. According to Time magazine, "prominent lawyers from Beijing jockeyed to serve on their defense team," and peasants who had fled the village returned home to corroborate Chen and Wu's accounts during the four-day trial. Pu Zhiqiang, a prominent civil rights lawyer, served as the couple's lawyer. Writing for the Washington Post, Philip Pan wrote that "by the time he finished his cross-examination, the mood in the courtroom had begun to change. When the trial ended three days later, the authors remained at the defendants' table, but it seemed as if Zhang – and the Communist Party itself – were the ones on trial. At the end of the trial, the judge declined to offer a verdict. Later, Chen and Wu's publisher privately paid Zhang a 50,000 yuan settlement to stop pursuing the case.

An account of the trial was recounted by journalist Philip Pan in his book Out of Mao's Shadow.
