= Ali Mustafa =

Ali Mustafa may refer to:

- Ali F. Mostafa (born 1981), British-Emirati filmmaker, director and producer
- Ali Mustafa (cricketer), Pakistani cricketer
- Ali Mustafa (footballer), Bruneian football ex-player and coach
- Ali Mustafa (journalist) (1984–2014), Pakistani-Canadian photographer and journalist
- Ali Mustafa Baghdady (1922–2005), Egyptian Air Force commander
- Abu Ali Mustafa (1938–2001), Secretary-General of the Popular Front for the Liberation of Palestine

== See also ==
- Mustafa
- Mustafa Ali (disambiguation)
