= Zoe Ramushu =

Zimbabwean artist and writer (born 1990)

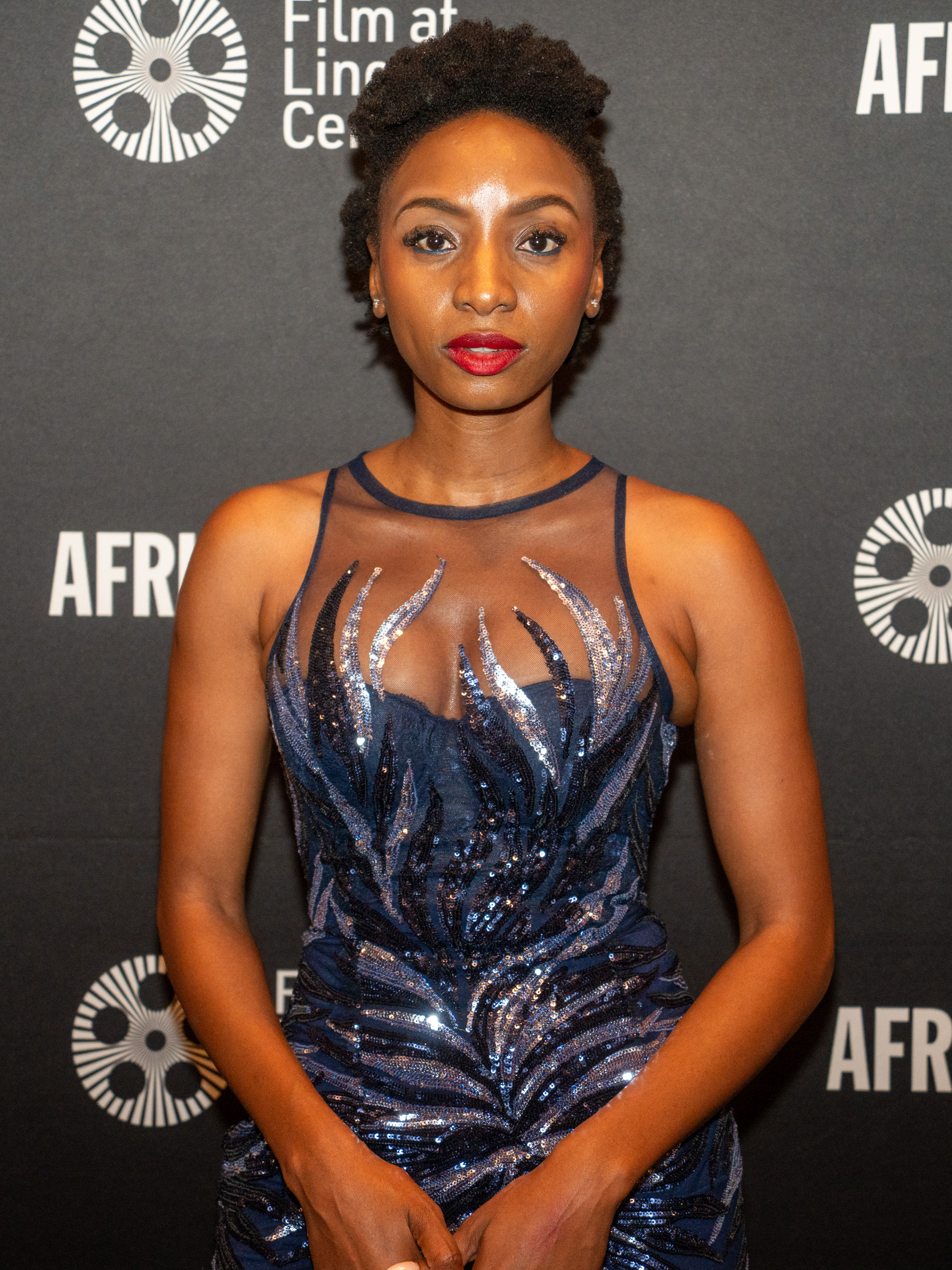
- Ramushu at the 2025 New York African Film Festival
- Born: Zoe Chiriseri; March 25, 1990 (age 36)
- Education: Wits University, Columbia Journalism School, Green Templeton College, Oxford
- Occupation: Filmmaker
- Years active: 2013–present

Zoe Ramushu is a South Africa-based writer, director, producer, actress and multimedia journalist. Her debut film, It Takes A Circus was nominated for the Student Academy Awards. Zoe Ramushu is co-founder and former spokesperson of Sisters Working in Film and Television. She also chairs a committee for the South African Department of Sports, Arts and Culture.

== Background ==
Zoe received an undergraduate degree in English and Law then an M.A. in African Literature from Wits University. She then went on to study documentary filmmaking at Columbia Journalism School. She received her M.Sc. from Columbia University in the City of New York. Ramushu is a Fellow of the Reuters Institute at Oxford University.

== Career ==
=== Film and television ===
Ramushu started her career in 2013 when she featured in commercials for KFC, Soul Candi and Grandpa then in 2015 she produced her first project, a reality show called 'My Perfect Date' which she shot in Zimbabwe. In 2016, Ramushu led a gender transformation agenda for African Film with women's organisation SWIFT which she co-founded.

In 2019 she produced two New York based documentaries. ‘It Takes a Circus’, her directing debut was nominated for the 48th Student Academy Awards (Student Oscars) and screened at Doc NYC 2021. The film screened at various festivals across the globe including the March on Washington Film Festival. The film was a finalist at the Independent Shorts Awards 2021 and won the Trenton Film Society award for Best Documentary 2022. She produced ‘To The Plate’ which was shortlisted for the BAFTA Student Film Awards and was the recipient of a Pulitzer Center Grant.

In 2021 Ramushu produced ‘Botlhale’, a South African short film which was selected to screen at the Lincoln Center during the New York Africa Film Festival. Botlhale was selected for various festivals and was also nominated for numerous awards at the Sotambe Film Festival. In late 2021, Ramushu was announced as one of the filmmakers to produce a Netflix film in partnership with the National Film and Video Foundation. Her showrunning debut, Pretty Hustle, a television series was selected as the first and only episodic project to pitch at Durban Film Mart's 2021 Finance Forum. Later in 2021 Ramushu was announced as a fellow of the Cannes Producers Network and was nominated to participate in The Gotham (formerly IFP). In 2022, Ramushu was selected for the Creative Producer Indaba, a lab for promising auteurs across Africa.

Ramushu secured her first film acting role in the South African film 'Bothlale' in 2021 and in 2022, Ramushu took on a role in the Netflix production 'Real Estate Sisters'. Her work has been recognized on global platforms such as the Berlinale, Cannes and Morocco film festivals amongst others.

=== Journalism ===
As a journalist, Ramushu wrote for America Magazine with a focus on Black filmmakers and their work. She was nominated for the Reuters Institute Fellowship at Oxford University through which she spent time developing the Chiriseri Test, a guide on newsroom diversity consisting of four questions. The test was envisioned as a journalism analog to the Bechdel test.
