= Ellie Cachette =

American investor and author (born 1985)

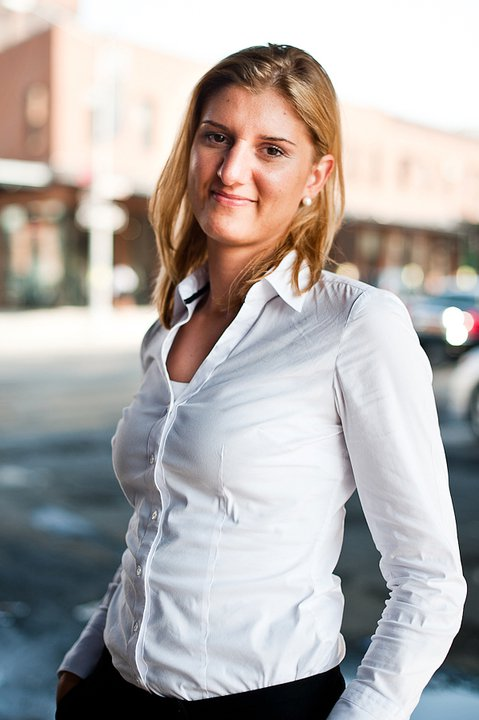
- Cachette in 2021
- Born: March 17, 1985 (age 41); Martinez, California, U.S.
- Education: California State Polytechnic University, Humboldt (BA)
- Occupations: Venture capital, philanthropy

Désirée "Ellie" Cachette (born March 17, 1985) is an American investor, philanthropist and author of Software Agreements for Dummies.

== Early life and education ==
Born in Martinez, California, Cachette was raised with her father who contracted HIV in the early-1980s as part of a group of hemophiliacs who were infected by recalled pharmaceutical products. The recall affected 20,000 Americans and 100,000 hemophiliacs worldwide. In 1997, the controversy was settled for $660 million in damages to be paid to over 6,000 victims by Bayer Pharmaceutical and three other companies.

A single father, Terry Stogdell raised Cachette for most of her childhood before his death due to AIDS complications in 2002. A notable AIDS activist, Stogdell was well-regarded as a public health advocate and part of the founding medical marijuana movement. Stogdell was crucial for gaining public support for 1996 California Proposition 215. Before his death, Stogdell testified as a part of United States v. Oakland Cannabis Buyers' Cooperative in support of legalizing cannabis for medicinal purposes in the state of California.

At the age of fourteen. Cachette received an award from the California State Senate for her efforts in public health initiatives. In 2003, at the age of seventeen, Cachette received a scholarship for her work in community health from KRON-TV called "Beating the Odds."

She earned a Bachelor of Arts degree in political science from Humboldt State University in 2006, graduating one year earlier than her class.

In 2013, Cachette was awarded Notable Alumni by Humboldt State. She currently serves as an advisor to Humboldt endowment programs.

== Career ==
Cachette's career started in technical project management, before evolving to startup founder in 2010. She then worked in venture consulting and switched to the venture capital industry in 2016.

In 2018, Cachette publicly discussed moving to Europe and launching an $1 billion investment fund-of-funds.

A September 2019 article by Bloomberg News highlighted questionable actions by Cachette surrounding her investment company, Cachette Capital. Cachette did not publicly responded to the media piece; however, she later gave a keynote in Barranquilla, Colombia and an interview in Romania. Cachette's fund is not open to the public and said to have investments dating back to 2018.

In March 2020, Cachette released an industry paper on the nuances of European venture capital growth and attributed most asset anomalies in Europe to investments being mainly backed by American capital yet recorded as "European growth". She regularly blogs about venture capital as an asset class and is an outspoken supporter of "democratizing capital."

== Philanthropy ==
Cachette is a donor to Humboldt State University, Women 2.0, Venture for America, and Break The Cycle. Cachette led a scholarship in her father's name at Humboldt State University with an endowment in the name of Terry L. Stogdell, which provides scholarships to students pursuing public health.

In March 2021, Cachette donated funds for an investigative reporter in California backed by Jason Calcanis and later found herself in controversy. She was labeled as a "leader for ousting" San Francisco District Attorney Chesa Boudin, with the magazine Mother Jones quoting Cachette as stating "VC Lives Matter" in response to the city spread initiative to recall Boudin. Immediately after publication, Cachette denounced the quote on social media saying it was misused along with her name; a local backlash ensued since Cachette is not a resident of San Francisco.

On March 25, 2022, Cachette, represented by counsel Cozen O'Connor, filed a lawsuit against Mother Jones in San Francisco, California. Cachette posted a statement to her personal website (since deleted) but has otherwise been silent on social media about the issue.
