= Érik Orsenna =

French politician and novelist

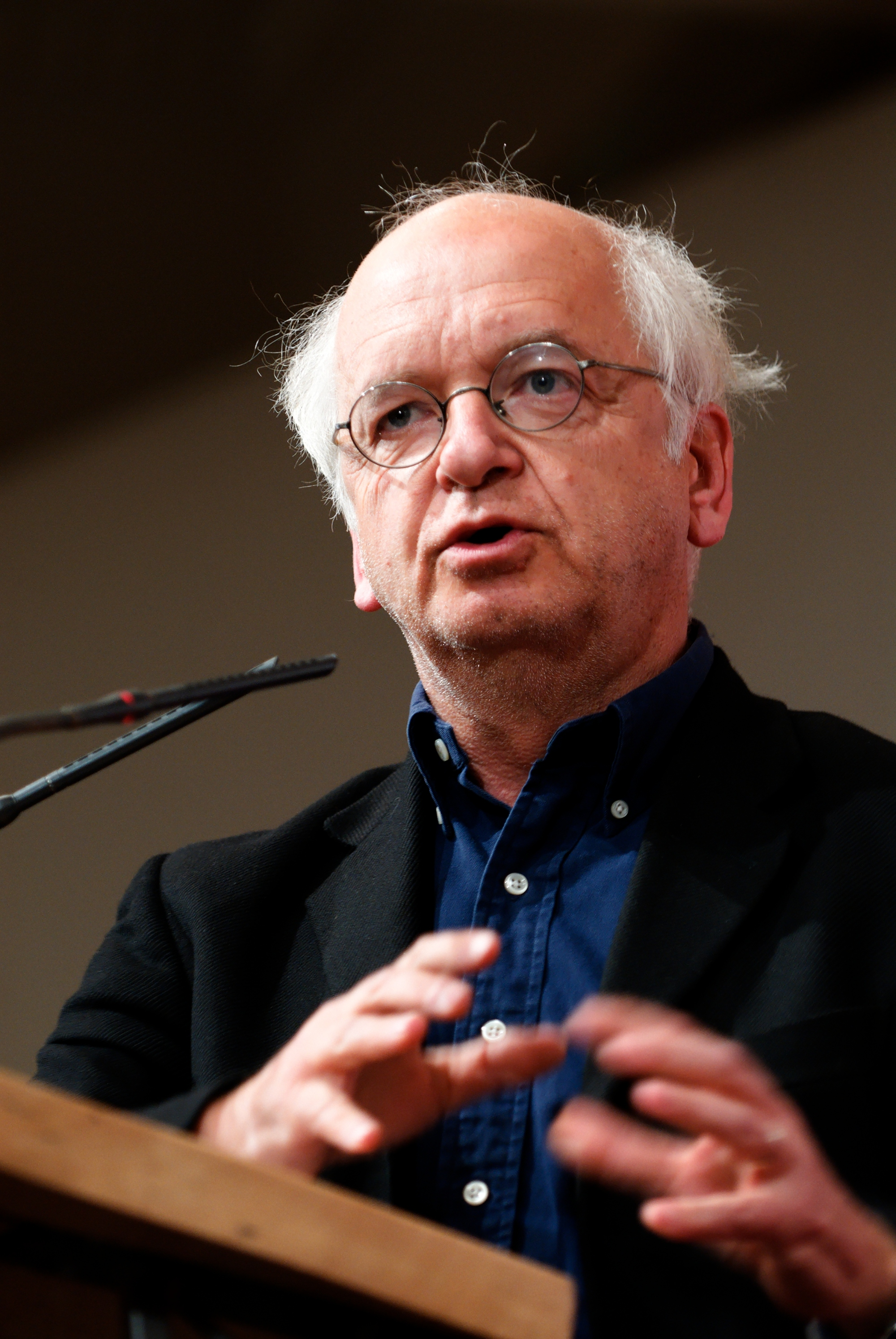
- Érik Orsenna, March 2008
- Born: Érik Arnoult; 22 March 1947 (age 79); Paris, France
- Education: Sciences Po; London School of Economics
- Occupation: Novelist
- Known for: Member of the Académie Française

Érik Orsenna is the pen-name of Érik Arnoult (born 22 March 1947) a French politician and novelist. After studying philosophy and political science at the Institut d'Études Politiques de Paris ("Sciences Po"), Orsenna specialized in economics at the London School of Economics. He was a close collaborator of François Mitterrand and held several government positions in the 1980s and 1990s. He is a member (currently on leave) of the Conseil d'État, having been appointed in 1985. He was awarded the Prix Goncourt in 1988 for his book L’exposition coloniale and was elected to the Académie Française on 28 May 1998. He won the 1990 International Nonino Prize in Italy. For Voyage au pays du coton he received the second prize of the Lettre Ulysses Award in 2006.

== Bibliography ==
- 1973 Loyola's blues (Le Seuil)
- 1977 La Vie comme à Lausanne (Le Seuil)
- 1977 Espace national et déséquilibre monétaire, under his real name Érik Arnoult (PUF)
- 1980 Une comédie française (Le Seuil)
- 1988 L'Exposition coloniale (Le Seuil)
- 1992 Besoin d'Afrique, in collaboration with Éric Fottorino and Christophe Guillemin (Fayard)
- 1993 Grand amour (Le Seuil)
- 1996 Histoire du monde en neuf guitares, with Thierry Arnoult (Le Seuil)
- 1996 Mésaventures du Paradis, mélodie cubaine, in collaboration with Bernard Matussière (Le Seuil)
- 1997 Deux étés (Fayard)
- 1998 Longtemps (Fayard)
- 2000 Portrait d'un homme heureux : André Le Nôtre (Fayard)
- 2001 La grammaire est une chanson douce (Stock)
- 2003 Madame Bâ (Fayard)
- 2004 Les Chevaliers du subjonctif (Stock)
- 2005 Dernières nouvelles des oiseaux (Stock)
- 2005 Portrait du Gulf Stream. Éloge des courants : promenade (Le Seuil)
- 2006 Voyage aux pays du coton. Petit précis de mondialisation (Fayard)
- 2006 Salut au Grand Sud, in collaboration with Isabelle Autissier (Stock)
- 2007 La Révolte des accents (Stock)
- 2007 Le Facteur et le Cachalot (Les Rois Mages)
- 2008 La Chanson de Charles Quint (Stock)
- 2008 L'Avenir de l'eau (Bonjour,Stock)
- 2009 Et si on dansait ? (Stock)
- 2010 L'Entreprise des Indes (Stock)
- 2010 Princesse Histamine (Stock)
