= Mustafa Ali (disambiguation) =

Mustafa Ali (born 1986) is an American professional wrestler.

Mustafa Ali may also refer to:

- Mustafa Ali (historian) (1541–1600), Ottoman historian
- Mustafa Ali (born 1944), Malaya-born politician
- Mustafa Ali, Cyprus Police Force officer and 1953 New Year Honours recipient of a Colonial Police Medal
- Mustafa Ali, commander of auxiliary troops in the aftermath of the Battle of Ab Darrah Pass, in 1511
- Mostafa Ali, Bangladeshi politician

== See also ==
- Ali Mustafa (disambiguation)
- Mustafa Abu Ali (1940–2009), Palestinian filmmaker
