= Humboldt Institute for Interdisciplinary Marijuana Research =

Humboldt Institute for Interdisciplinary Marijuana Research (HIIMR) is an organization located at California State Polytechnic University, Humboldt whose focus is to analyze and research societal issues on marijuana.

== History ==
HIIMR was officially established as a marijuana research institute in 2012, during a time of evolving laws and perceptions of marijuana. HIIMR is intended to be a statewide center of policy and research on marijuana, providing information and expertise for policy makers, health care and medical professionals, business and the media.

The institute emphasizes "analysis, not advocacy," stating that they take no stance on legalization or decriminalization of marijuana. No classes or training are offered at HIIMR. The institute hosts outside speakers and lecturers discussing issues related to marijuana and cannabis in public policy, business, and recreation. The institute's mission is to share information, contribute research to public policy debated and to help broaden community and national understanding of marijuana.

In 2026, the institute's codirectors were Dr. Whitney Ogle and Dr. Dominic Corva.

== Publications ==
Publications

- Meisel, J., (2017). Hidden in Plain Sight: Cannabis Cultivation in the Emerald Triangle. The California Geographer.
- Zender, J., (2016). Impact of Marijuana Decriminalization on the Washington State Budget: Year One. National Social Science Journal.
- Mourad et al., (2015). Patterns of Natural and Human-Caused Mortality Factors of a Rare Forest Carnivore, the Fisher (Pekania pennanti) in California. PLOS ONE.
- Carah et al., (2015). High Time for Conservation: Adding the Environment to the Debate on Marijuana Liberalization. BioScience.
- Swartz, R. (2010). Medical marijuana users in substance abuse treatment. Harm Reduction Journal, 7(3)
- Gold Gregg J. and AT Nguyen (2009). Comparing entering freshmen's perceptions of campus marijuana and alcohol use to reported use. Journal of Drug Education. 39(2):133-48.

Books

- Corva, D., & Meisel., J. (2022). The Routledge Handbook of Post-Prohibition Cannabis Research. Routledge.
- Huffman, J., & Miller, C. (2018). Where There's Smoke: The Environmental Science, Public Policy, and Politics of Marijuana. University Press of Kansas.

Articles

- Meisel et al., (2019). Eliminate Restrictions in preventing cannabis research. Policy Options.

Video

- Video titled Ecological Impacts of Industrial Marijuana Operations of grow sites by Prof. Anthony Silvaggio and his students.
- Documentary titled Dispensing Cannabis: The California Story : Voices from Inside by Prof. Ann Alter and B. Shaw and S. Spain.
- For streaming videos from the Speaker Series and symposia, visit the News and Events page and Humboldt Digital Scholar.

== See also ==
- Nicotine and Cannabis Policy Center
