= Graduation Pledge of Social and Environmental Responsibility =

Voluntary student pledge

The Graduation Pledge of Social and Environmental Responsibility is a voluntary pledge made by students graduating from colleges or universities, stating their commitment to social and environment responsibility in their future careers. The pledge was first offered in 1987 at colleges and universities in the United States, and has since spread to some institutions in other countries.

== Wording and meaning ==
The Pledge states: I pledge to explore and take into account the social and environmental consequences of any job I consider and will try to improve these aspects of any organizations for which I work. The purpose of the Pledge is to encourage graduating students to be aware of the social and environmental impact of their employment as they enter the workforce or continue their education, though it is left to students to define for themselves what "socially and environmentally responsible" means.

Students who voluntarily sign the pledge seek out employment that reflects their values, sometimes turning down jobs with which they do not feel comfortable. Others find employment and then work to make changes in their workplaces. Some examples include promoting recycling at their workplace, removing discriminatory language from training materials, working for gender equality in athletics, and helping to convince employers to reject contracts that would clearly have negative impacts on society or the environment.

== History ==
The pledge was first established at Humboldt State University, California, in 1987. It originated at a time when social responsibility became a widely discussed theme in the wake of 1978 reconstitution of Physicians for Social Responsibility to involve doctors in policy discussions about nuclear power, the 1981 founding of Computer Professionals for Social Responsibility, and the socially responsible investing movement which grew out of the anti-apartheid divestment movement. By 1988, students at Stanford, UC Berkeley, UC Santa Cruz, San Francisco State University, and MIT organized graduation pledges for their commencement ceremonies.

Manchester University in Indiana hosted the effort from 1996 to 2007, at which time Bentley University near Boston became the host. The project takes shape in different ways depending on the institution. At some colleges, for example, students sign wallet-sized cards with the pledge written on them that they can keep as a reminder of the commitment they've made. Some institutions put the pledge into the formal program for their commencement ceremonies. At other institutions, pledge signers wear green ribbons or green tassels at commencement to signify their commitment (some schools use a different color of ribbon). At Bentley University the pledge is a "capstone" of its four-year Civic Leadership Program, and at Humboldt State University, the student government funds a student pledge coordinator internship.

== Impact ==
The pledge serves to promote social and environmental responsibility on three different levels: Students and alumni who are making choices about employment; schools including values and citizenship in their curriculum as opposed to just knowledge and skills; and the workplaces and wider society being concerned about issues beyond just the bottom line. The Graduation Pledge Alliance maintains a web site for campus organizers and those who have signed the Pledge.

== Extent ==
Over 100 universities and colleges as well as some high schools use the pledge to some extent. There are several different types of schools involved, including:

- Liberal arts colleges such as Manchester University, Juniata College, Muhlenberg College and Hartwick College.
- State universities such as the University of Colorado, Boulder and the University of Florida.
- Private research universities such as the Massachusetts Institute of Technology and Stanford University.
- Private graduate schools such as Antioch University New England.
- Faith schools such as Goshen College and Bethel College.
- Community Colleges such as Estrella Mountain Community College, Mesa Community College and Broward College.
- Professional schools such as the Fashion Institute of Technology.
- Schools outside the U.S. such as Trent University and the University of Saskatchewan in Canada and the Chinese Culture University in Taiwan.
