= New York Week in Review =

New York Week in Review is a weekly 30 minute public television program covering New York State government and politics. Like the national Public Broadcasting Service (PBS) show Washington Week in Review, it featured a round table of reporters as weekly guests. The show was a statewide production of WMHT public television and aired on all of the state's PBS affiliates. It was later rebranded as NY NOW.

== History ==
New York Week in Review was a weekly 30-minute news program covering state government and politics produced by WMHT Educational Telecommunications for the PBS stations across New York State. It was launched in January 1996 after WMHT and the state's PBS stations cancelled Inside Albany, an award-winning, long-running weekly program featuring in-depth reporting from longtime hosts Dave Hepp and Lise Bang Jensen. New York Week in Review's founding producer and host was WMHT's Michael Carrese who handled coverage of state government and politics for the statewide PBS system from 1994 to 2001 in addition to producing and hosting coverage of local government and politics for WMHT. Veteran journalist Karen Dewitt, who provided daily coverage of the Capitol for NPR member stations throughout the state, was a regular presence on NYWIR from its inception and continued to play a significant role in the successor program, New York NOW.

As a cost-saving measure, the NYWIR format was limited to a reporter "roundtable" discussion and did not include produced reports. Over time, interviews with key figures were incorporated including with Governor George Pataki, U.S. Senator Chuck Schumer, New York City Mayor Rudy Giuliani, and others. In 2000, Carrese and Dewitt conducted the only long-form television interview with U.S. Senate candidate and First Lady Hillary Clinton, pairing it with a separately recorded conversation with her opponent Rick Lazio.

In order to make it easier for reporters to appear on the show, the first season of NYWIR was recorded in an art gallery at the Albany Institute of History & Art instead of at WMHT's studio in Rotterdam, New York. The station later created a small studio in rented space walking distance from the New York State Capitol. Regular panelists included Kyle Hughes of NYSNYS News, Richard Pérez-Peña of The New York Times, Jay Gallagher of Gannett, Fredric U. Dicker of the New York Post, Elizabeth Benjamin of Times Union, Yancey Roy of Gannett News Service, Erik Kriss of The Post-Standard, Jon Sorensen of The New York Daily News, and Eric Durr of the Watertown Daily Times.

After Carrese's departure to start a political satire troupe called Only in New York, Jim Brennan, a longtime anchor on Albany's ABC affiliate WTEN, took over the show and remained at the helm until 2007. In the spring of that year, Susan Arbetter, formerly the news director at WAMC became the host and producer of NYWIR. She added produced reports to the format while retaining the reporter roundtable discussion.
