= California State Polytechnic University, Humboldt =

Public university in Arcata, California, US

Coordinates: 40.876°N 124.079°W

- Former names: Humboldt State Normal School (1913–1921); Humboldt State Teacher's College (1921-1935); Humboldt State College (1935–1972); California State University, Humboldt (1972–1974); Humboldt State University (1974–2022)
- Motto: Φως Αλήθεια (Greek)
- Motto in English: "Truth and Light"
- Type: Public polytechnic university
- Established: June 16, 1913; 113 years ago
- Parent institution: California State University
- Accreditation: WSCUC
- Endowment: $46.7 million (2025)
- Budget: $303.6 million (2024-25)
- President: Richard A. Carvajal
- Provost: Jenn Capps
- Faculty: 523 (fall 2024)
- Students: 6,045 (fall 2024)
- Undergraduates: 5,463 (fall 2024)
- Postgraduates: 582 (fall 2024)
- Location: Arcata, California, United States
- Campus: 144 acres (58 ha) main campus and nearly 591 acres (239 ha) of additional property. Total: 733 acres.; Remote town
- Newspaper: The Lumberjack
- Colors: Green and gold
- Nickname: Lumberjacks
- Sporting affiliations: NCAA Division II – CCAA; GNAC
- Mascot: Lucky Logger
- Website: humboldt.edu

California State Polytechnic University, Humboldt (Cal Poly Humboldt or Humboldt) is a public university in Arcata, California. It is one of three polytechnic universities in the California State University (CSU) system and the northernmost campus in the system.

The main campus, situated hillside at the edge of a coast redwood forest, overlooks Arcata, much of Humboldt Bay, and the Pacific Ocean. The college town setting on the California North Coast, 8 miles (13 km) north of Eureka, 279 miles (449 km) north of San Francisco, and 654 miles (1053 km) north of Los Angeles, is notable for its natural beauty. It is the westernmost four-year university in the contiguous United States. Humboldt is a Hispanic-serving institution (HSI).

The university is divided into three colleges: the College of Arts, Humanities, and Social Sciences; the College of Natural Resources and Sciences; and the College of Professional Studies. It offers 58 bachelor's degree programs, 14 master's degree programs, 76 minors, and 4 credential programs.

== History ==
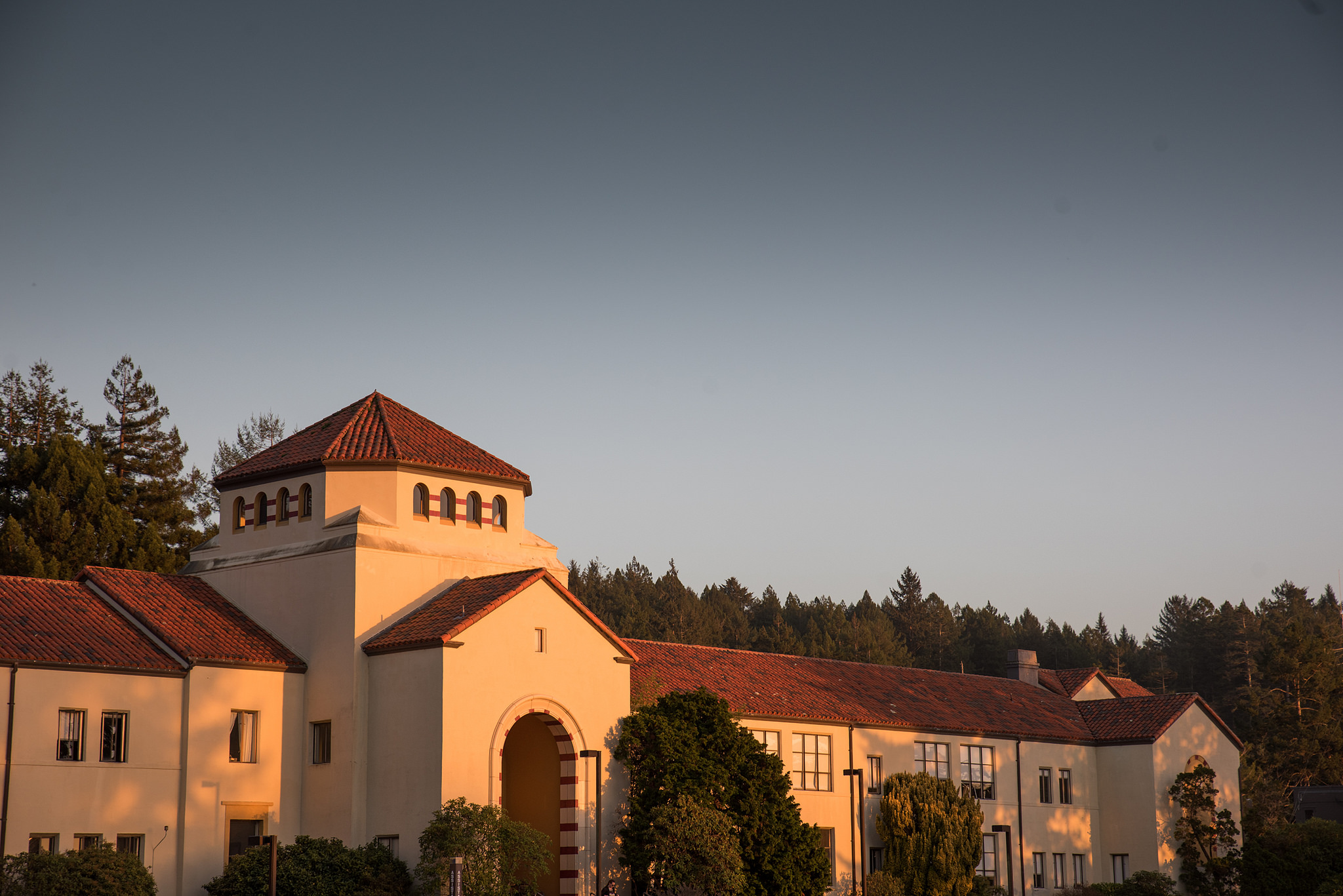
Founders Hall

Humboldt State Normal School was established as a teacher's college on June 16, 1913, by California governor Hiram Johnson. It was one of about 180 institutions founded by state governments to train teachers for the rapidly growing public schools. The cities of Arcata and Eureka (and to a lesser extent Fortuna) competed with one another to host the new campus. Arcata was selected after William Preston and the Union Water Company donated 55 acres (22 hectares) to serve as the site of the new school's campus. It opened on April 6, 1914, before construction at the location was complete, in the former Arcata Grammar School building, with 78 students enrolled and 5 faculty members teaching. The first class, comprising 15 women, graduated on May 26, 1915.

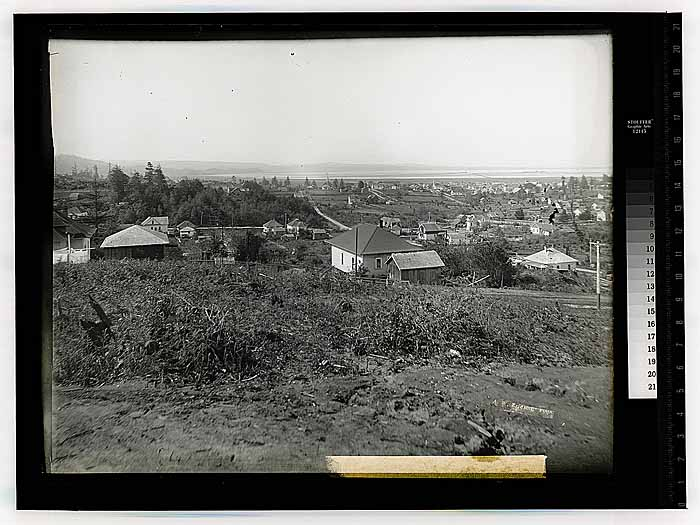
View from high point of Humboldt State Normal campus, 1915

The school was put under the jurisdiction of the California Department of Education, renamed Humboldt State Teacher's College and Junior College, and moved to its current location in 1921. In 1924, during the presidency of Ralph Waldo Swetman, the Associated Students and the Alumni Association were organized and The Foghorn, the first student newspaper, was published. Bachelor's degrees began being offered in 1927. The school was renamed Humboldt State College in 1935, and the following year an official mascot was adopted: the Lumberjack. In 1937, the students opened a cooperative bookstore and soda fountain, which would exist for the next 40 years as the center of student life.

During World War II, Arcata's city defense council suggested camouflaging Founder's Hall, which is visible from the Pacific Ocean, so it would not be a target for Japanese submarines. The council made its request in 1942, but Founder's Hall was not painted until the spring of 1944. The building remained camouflage green until 1948. Over the course of the war, President Arthur Gist corresponded with hundreds of the students who had left Humboldt State to serve in the war. The "Arthur Gist Letters," an archive of more than 1,000 individual letters from 365 servicemen and women who wrote to Gist while serving in the military, were donated to the school after his death and are available for viewing at Cal Poly Humboldt Library's Special Collections & Archives.

Graduate programs were first offered in 1947. Under President Cornelius H. Siemens in 1952, HSU continued expanding by accepting students from abroad, including some from Yugoslavia, Germany and the Near East, as well as U.S. territories such as American Samoa, Guam and Hawaii. KHSU began broadcasting from the school as a 10-watt carrier current radio station in 1947 (using the call sign KHSC until 1972), and on October 17, 1960, it became the first licensed, non-commercial station operated by a state college in California. Also in 1960, the college became a part of the newly-formed California State College system. The school's junior college program, terminated in 1962, was re-established in 1964 at College of the Redwoods (CR), located only 17 miles (27 km) to the south in Eureka. The two institutions maintain a close working relationship, with many students transferring to Humboldt after graduating from CR.

Student activism on campus rose through the 1960s and early 1970s, peaking in a protest of about 800 students (out of 3,600) against the Vietnam War on October 15, 1969. This was followed by another protest with nearly 3,000 students who planned to boycott classes after the Cambodian campaign. With similar events taking place across the state, Governor Ronald Reagan shut down the CSC system in May 1970 for five days. The 1970s also saw the rise of feminist, ethnocultural, and LGBT groups, and though the Women's Center was the only one to survive through the 1980s, most groups reappeared by the mid-1990s.

Alumnus David Philips established the Humboldt Film Festival in 1967, now one of the oldest student-run festivals in the world.

In 1972, the college was renamed California State University, Humboldt, however it still continued to be popularly referred to as "Humboldt State." Reflecting this, its name was simplified to Humboldt State University in 1974. Enrollment first surpassed 7,500 in 1974, with a peak of 8,790 in 2015, making it one of the smallest in the CSU system throughout its existence. Through the 1980s, adult learners became a large part of Humboldt State's student body, and in 1986, 40% of the students were over the age of 25. That number has since decreased to approx. 30%.

In 1987, students and activists founded the optional Graduation Pledge of Social and Environmental Responsibility, with the stated purpose of encouraging graduating students to be mindful of the social and environmental impacts of their employment as they enter the workforce or continue their education. Today, over one hundred post-secondary educational institutions worldwide use the pledge in some capacity.

On April 22, 2024, dozens of pro-Palestinian protesters occupied Siemens Hall as part of a wider movement of occupation protests against the Gaza war. Protesters renamed the building to "Intifada Hall" and managed to repel an initial police incursion. At some point protesters occupied a second building, Nelson Hall. On April 30, a large law enforcement task force stormed both occupied buildings and arrested at least 35 people, bringing the occupation to an end. On February 27, 2026, a further group of around 20 pro-Palestinian protesters occupied Nelson Hall after claims that a "public forum" was reduced to a "listening session" with an Associate Vice President of the university. The protesters were removed around 1 a.m. the next morning by the Arcata Police. As a result, three students were placed on interim suspension and one was later arrested by University Police.

The Department of Education's Office for Civil Rights announced on March 18, 2025 that Cal Poly Humboldt was one of 44 schools being scrutinized under Title VI at the direction of Secretary Linda McMahon, in relation to a partnership with The Ph.D. Project, a nonprofit organization that helps underrepresented individuals earn doctorates and secure business school faculty positions. The investigation also included two other public universities in California: Cal State San Bernardino and UC Berkeley. In response, a spokesperson for CSU stated that the organization is reviewing the claim and intends to cooperate, but that it does not discriminate and complies with all relevant state and federal laws.

=== Name ===
The university, founded as Humboldt State Normal College in 1913, took the name of the county and nearby bay, which was originally named after the famous German scientist Alexander von Humboldt.

On May 23, 1972, fourteen of the nineteen CSU campuses were renamed to "California State University," followed by a comma and then their geographic designation. The five campuses exempted from renaming were the five newest state colleges created during the 1960s. The new names were very unpopular at certain campuses. Over the objections of CSU Chancellor Glenn Dumke, state Assemblyman Al Alquist proposed a bill that would rename the San Jose campus back to San Jose State. A few years later, some other CSU campuses, the Humboldt campus among them, also secured passage of similar legislation, and California State University, Humboldt was renamed Humboldt State University from 1974 until 2022.

On January 26, 2022, the university was officially renamed to California State Polytechnic University, Humboldt, becoming the third polytechnic university in the state. The change is backed by a $458 million investment from the state of California.

== Academics ==
Undergraduate admission statistics
	Fall 2025	Fall 2024	Fall 2023	Fall 2022	Fall 2021
First-time Freshmen
Applicants	15,033	16,698	16,556	9,239	7,013
Admits	14,076	15,442	13,855	8,350	6,414
Admit rate	94%	92%	84%	90%	91%
Enrolled	892	910	955	961	629
Yield rate	6%	6%	7%	12%	10%
Transfers
Applicants	4,581	4,845	5,037	3,581	3,795
Admits	3,947	4,251	3,939	3,014	3,112
Admit rate	86%	88%	78%	84%	82%
Enrolled	930	848	802	811	758
Yield rate	24%	20%	20%	27%	24%

The university is divided into three colleges: the College of Arts, Humanities, and Social Sciences; the College of Natural Resources and Sciences; and the College of Professional Studies. There are 48 undergraduate majors and 69 minors. The two largest majors are biology and art, both with over 20 faculty members and extensive facilities on- and off-campus. This CSU campus offers a wildlife undergraduate degree. There are several credential programs and fourteen master's programs, of which natural resources and social work are the largest. The new Energy, Environment, and Society graduate program is unique to the CSU, and provides graduates with interdisciplinary training in engineering, economics, and climate policy. In April of 2026, the university announced it was launching five new academic programs: Applied Humanities, Critical Agriculture Studies and Agroecology, Community Health, Health and Medical Science, and a master's degree in STEM Education. This is the second of three waves of program launches designed as part of the school's transition to a polytechnic university, with a target completion of 2029.

The University Library supports students and faculty from all three academic colleges. Humboldt State University Press (now called the Press at Cal Poly Humboldt) was launched in 1991 to showcase research and scholarship across the campus. The Forestry department building's walls are completely paneled with different species of wood. The building was rebuilt in October 1980 after the original building was burned down. The original building stood for 17 years before an arsonist, whose identity is still unknown today, set the building on fire in 1979.

Cal Poly Humboldt is one of only two universities in California to offer a major in botany; the other is California State Polytechnic University, Pomona. Its botany program is the nation's largest undergraduate program. Cal Poly Humboldt is the only university in California to offer a degree in rangeland resources and wildland soil science. The Native American Studies major and the Oceanography major are also unique to the California State University system. The university offers unique minors including multicultural queer studies, scientific diving, and appropriate technology.

The university's location on the North Coast provides access to the Pacific Ocean, lagoons, marshes, estuaries, and the Fred Telonicher Marine Laboratory, which provides opportunities for "hands-on" experiences and research for the sciences. The Marine Lab was opened in 1966, the lab is open during the academic school year (mid August-mid May).

Cal Poly Humboldt's fire science program teaches modern techniques for managing wildfire, and an advanced training program is offered for Forest Service employees and similar professionals.

The college of eLearning & Extended Ed (CEEE) is a self-supporting outreach department of Cal Poly Humboldt that provides a variety of academic, professional development and personal enrichment opportunities. While the CEEE programs are open to almost everyone, there is an emphasis on providing access to those community members who are not matriculated students at the university. Non-matriculated students may take some regular university courses through the CEEE Open University program. High school students may take regular university courses through the CEEE High School Concurrent Enrollment Program. Also, those aged 60 and over may take regular classes through the Over 60 Program. There are also a variety of online degree programs offered through the college. The CEEE also offers a wide range of diverse and eclectic programs. Examples include music and art programs for children, the Osher Lifelong Learning Institute for those aged 50 and over, foreign language classes, travel-study programs, continuing education for teachers, MFT/LCSW, nurses, and law enforcement. In 1998 Humboldt State University opened the HSU First Street Gallery in Old Town Eureka, expanding community access to the university's cultural and fine arts programs. In 2007, the university further expanded its presence in Eureka with the opening of the HSU Humboldt Bay Aquatic Center, a $4.5 million aquatic facility on the bay in Old Town Eureka. Future plans include a new HSU Bay and Estuarine Studies Center. This new facility will be closer to the Coral Sea (in 2012 docked at Woodley Island, Eureka), the only vessel in a U.S. educational institution solely dedicated to undergraduate research. The new facility would be considerably larger than the other existing facility, the Fred Telonicher Marine Laboratory in Trinidad, 20 miles (32 km) north.

Cal Poly Humboldt Professor Steve Sillett has conducted groundbreaking research on redwood forest canopies and was featured in a 2009 cover story in National Geographic. He holds the Kenneth L. Fisher Chair in Redwood Forest Ecology, the only endowed chair in the world dedicated to a single tree species.

=== Statistics ===
Undergraduate demographics as of fall 2023
Race and ethnicity	Total
White	50%
Hispanic	31%
Two or more races (Note: Other consists of multiracial Americans and those who prefer not to say.)	7%
Unknown	4%
Asian	3%
Black	3%
Native American	2%
Economic diversity
Low-income (Note: The percentage of students who received an income-based federal Pell grant intended for low-income students)	52%
Affluent (Note: The percentage of students who are a part of the American middle class at the bare minimum)	48%

==== Student demographics ====
As of fall 2018 Cal Poly Humboldt had the largest enrollment percentage of Native Americans and the third largest enrollment percentage of multiracial individuals in the Cal State system.

Number of enrolled students: 6,045 (fall 2024)

- 5,976 (fall 2023)
- 5,858 (fall 2022)

Gender:

- 56.0% female
- 44.0% male

=== Rankings ===
Academic rankings

Master's
- Washington Monthly: 59

Regional
- U.S. News & World Report: 32

National
- Forbes: 623
- WSJ/College Pulse: 501–600

2024-25 USNWR Best Regional Colleges West Rankings
Top Public Schools	17
Best College for Veterans	18
Top Performers on Social Mobility	31
Best Value Schools	37
Best Undergraduate Engineering Programs	94 (of schools without doctorate programs)

2023-2024 USNWR Graduate School Rankings
Program	Ranking
Social Work	172

- Cal Poly Humboldt is one of the colleges profiled in The Princeton Review's book, Colleges with a Conscience: 81 Great Schools with Outstanding Community Involvement. The school was selected because of its record of having excellent service-learning programs and its blending of academics with community work.
- U.S. News & World Report ranked Cal Poly Humboldt tied for 37th out of 127 schools in the Regional Universities (West) category for 2021, and in the same category also ranked it 17th best public school, 22nd best for veterans, 33rd for best value, and tied for 34th best for social mobility.

== Student life ==
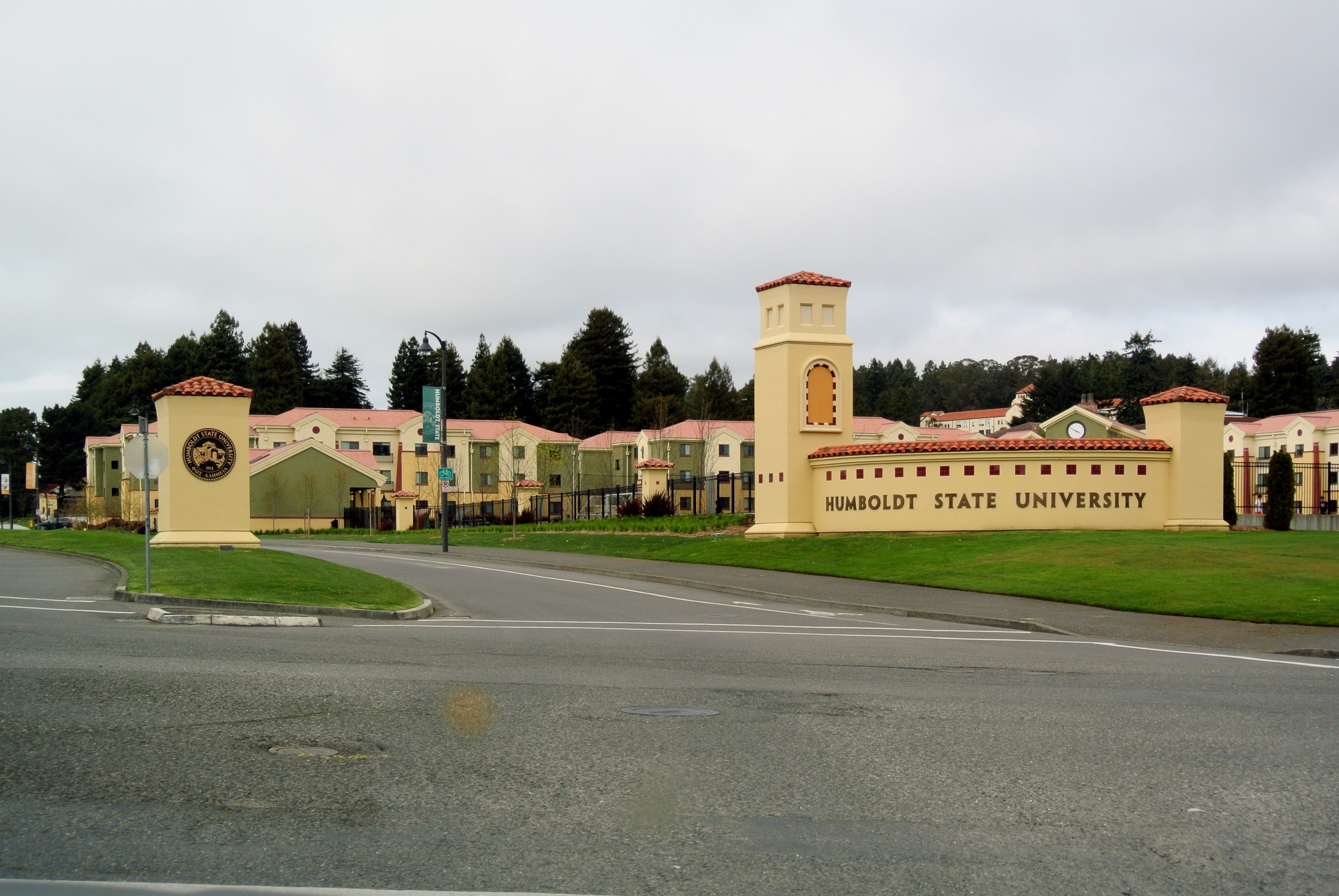
Primary HSU campus entrance on LK Wood Blvd (south side, adjacent to US-101)

The Humboldt Energy Independence Fund (HEIF) is unique to the CSU, and uses student fee money to fund renewable energy and energy efficiency projects on campus. HEIF provides a rare opportunity for students, faculty, and plant operations staff to work together collaboratively towards a goal of a lower-carbon and energy-independent future. Compost and recycling bins are more common on campus than trash cans and many events are encouraged to be zero waste, all coordinated through the student-run Waste Reduction and Resource Awareness Program (WRRAP). The Associated Students fund WRRAP, the Campus Center for Appropriate Technology, and the Sustainable Living Arts and Music Festival (SLAM fest).

Cal Poly Humboldt built the first building in the CSU system to be LEED-gold certified for its eco-friendly features. The Behavioral and Social Sciences Building has facilities for rainwater collection and sustainably harvested wood native-plant landscaping, among others.

There are over 200 clubs on campus; these include a variety of options that range from social interests, academic, Greek life and sports.

=== Student media ===
The university has multiple publications. The Lumberjack is the university's only student-run weekly newspaper.

The university also has a monthly student-run newspaper, El Leñador, which is bilingual and produced by students with minority backgrounds. El Leñador received first place in competing against other monthly and bi-weekly papers from four- and two-year colleges and universities across California.

Osprey is the university's student-run magazine, published twice annually. It has won first-place awards in major regional competitions, including the Society of Professional Journalists' "Mark of Excellence" Awards and the California Intercollegiate Press Association awards.

Cal Poly Humboldt is also the only university in the CSU system to have a university press. The Press at Cal Poly Humboldt publishes high-quality scholarly, intellectual, and creative works by or in support of the campus community.

=== Athletics ===
The Lumberjacks program is affiliated with the NCAA on the Division II level and is a member of the California Collegiate Athletic Association. Cal Poly Humboldt currently sponsors 12 intercollegiate sports programs — men's and women's soccer, basketball, cross country, track and field, women's volleyball, softball, rowing, and, formerly, football (in which it competed in the Great Northwest Athletic Conference).

In addition to NCAA sanctioned athletics, Cal Poly Humboldt also supports club sports including, archery, baseball, cheer, climbing, cycling, disc golf, fencing, logging sports, men's and women's lacrosse, men's and women's rugby, men's and women's ultimate Frisbee, men's crew, and men's volleyball.

- Women's (2)
  - Softball (2): 1999, 2008

=== On-campus housing ===
As of 2022, 2,069 beds were available on campus. As Cal Poly Humboldt enrolls nearly 6,000 students and as there is an acute housing shortage in Arcata, homelessness is prevalent among the student population. The university has sought to restrict and penalize students who are forced to live in cars, RVs or vans on campus. A 2018 study concluded that almost 20% of Cal Poly Humboldt students had experienced recent homelessness, double the rate of the CSU system as a whole.

University housing consists of six living areas: The Hill, Cypress, and Canyon for first-year students, and the College Creek Apartments, Campus Apartments, Creekview, and Cypress for other students. To address a housing shortage, Cal Poly Humboldt contracted with four local hotels—the Motel 6, Super 8, Ramada Inn, and Comfort Inn—to provide approximately 350 beds of "bridge housing" to students. By 2023, however, the university eliminated three of the four options, leaving only the Comfort Inn as the only motel option. A new off-campus housing complex, Craftsman Mall, will house a thousand residents and is projected to open in fall 2025; new on-campus housing for an additional 600 to 700 students is projected to open in summer 2027. Cal Poly Humboldt announced it was closing the Campus Apartments in late January 2025 on the recommendations of a consultant after mold tests conducted in a recently vacated room. The apartments are expected to be demolished after the new Hinarr Hu Moulik housing complex opens. In April 2025, it was reported that Hinarr Hu Moulik would open for up to 600 students in the Fall 2025 semester.

=== Klamath Connection Program ===
The Klamath River is the focus of the Klamath Connection, which is designed to help freshmen learn important skills for future science careers.

=== Y.E.S. House ===
The Y.E.S. House (Youth Educational Services) programs are created by students and led by student volunteer programs. There are currently 17 programs running.

== Centers and institutes ==
Centers and institutes at the university include:

- The California Center for Rural Policy at Cal Poly Humboldt - a research center to assist policy development. community building community, and promoting the health of rural people and their environments.
- Humboldt Science and Mathematics Center - its mission is to enhance science and mathematics education. It was chartered in 2005, and offers programs and professional support for teachers and for students preparing for the professionals. The center is formally affiliated with a number of university programs.
- The Humboldt Institute for Interdisciplinary Marijuana Research (HIIMR) - founded in 2012 and seeks to improve the economic, social, physical, and environmental health of individuals and communities through the interdisciplinary scientific study of marijuana and marijuana extracts by working with users of the drug and local cannabis dispensaries to collect data. Since 2016, HIIMR designs, conducts, analyzes, and disseminates research; provides applied expertise to policy makers, researchers, students, health professionals, businesses, and the media; and archives and provides access to source materials (raw data, media).
- Institute for Cartographic Design - affiliated with the Department of Geography and its Kosmos Lab for teaching cartography, this institute provides cartography students with an opportunity to engage in applied map design before graduation, provides a centralized cartographic design service on campus, in all formats from paper to web to animation.
- The Institute of Health and Human Performance - supports the local community in activities for health promotion. It supports research and training for faculty and students in health, human performance, disease prevention, physical activity and nutrition.
- The Institute for Entrepreneurship Education - designed to reach other academic departments on campus as well as the Redwood Coast business community. It is oriented around interdisciplinary study, with a focus on social entrepreneurship and an ethic of social responsibility.
- The Institute for Spatial Analysis (ISA) - is devoted to the expansion of spatial analysis methodologies in multiple disciplines and the real world issues. It works with both public and private sector entities.
- The Schatz Energy Research Center (SERC) - works to establish clean energy technology. It specializes in renewable energy, energy efficiency, and hydrogen energy systems, especially increasing the efficiency of fuel cells. Its work involves research and development, technology demonstration, project development, energy systems analysis, and education and training.
- Museum & Gallery Practices Certification Program

== Notable people ==
=== Alumni ===
- Marisa Anderson, guitarist and composer, dropped out at age 19
- Taylor Boggs (b. 1987), football player
- Melissa Braden, sculptor and ceramic artist
- Dean L. Bresciani, President of North Dakota State University
- Ellie Cachette (b. 1985), technology executive, activist and author
- Alex Cappa (b. 1995), football player for the Las Vegas Raiders
- Raymond Carver (1938-1988), author and poet
- Mark Conover (1960-2022), winner of 1988 Olympic Marathon trials
- Dan Curry, visual effects producer
- Chris Dixon (b. 1981), indoor football player and coach
- Trevor Dunn (b. 1968), bassist for Mr. Bungle and Fantomas
- Jack Fimple (b. 1959), former Major League Baseball catcher for the Los Angeles Dodgers
- Ken Fisher (b. 1950), billionaire CEO of Fisher Investments, long-time Forbes columnist, and author of books on investing
- Harrell Fletcher (b. 1967), artist
- David Gelbaum (c. 1950-2018), businessman, green technology investor and environmental philanthropist
- Corey Gray, Native American physicist and science communicator
- Dave Harper (1966-2021), former NFL linebacker
- Wendell Hayes, football player
- Danny Herrera, powerlifter
- Stephen Hillenburg, creator of Nickelodeon's SpongeBob SquarePants
- John Kiffmeyer, drummer
- Ian "Vaush" Kochinski, political YouTube livestreamer and commentator
- Jeffrey D. Levine, former United States Ambassador to Estonia
- Clinton McKinnon (b.1969), Mr. Bungle musician
- Michael Moore, member of the Instant Composers Pool
- Mike Patton (b. 1968), musician, notable for his work with Faith No More, Mr. Bungle, and film scoring
- Steven Selva (b. 1948), botanist and Professor Emeritus at the University of Maine
- Monroe Spaght (1909-1993) research chemist, president and chairman of the Shell Oil Company
- Marla Spivak (b. 1955), entomologist and professor at the University of Minnesota
- Trey Spruance (b. 1969), Mr. Bungle and Secret Chiefs 3 musician
- Josh Suggs (b. 1989), current Major League Soccer defender; Colorado Springs Switchbacks FC
- Brian D. Tripp (Karuk), sculptor, poet, mixed-media artist, educator
- Micah True (1953-2012), ultrarunner
- Martin Wong (1946–1999), painter and ceramist
- Cedar Wright (b. 1975), rock climber and filmmaker

=== Faculty ===
- Don Gregorio Antón (b. 1956), artist and educator (Emeritus Professor)
- Marcy Burstiner, journalist
- Jim Dodge (b. 1945), novelist and poet
- Ronald A. Fritzsche (b. 1945) (emeritus), ichthyologist.
- Robert A. Gearheart (b. 1938) (emeritus), environmental engineer
- Victor Golla (1939–2021) (emeritus), linguist
- Steven C. Hackett (b. 1960), economist
- Vincent Ialenti (b. 1987), anthropologist
- Eric Rofes (1954-2006), gay activist, feminist, educator, and author
- Stephen C. Sillett (b. 1968), botanist
- Brian D. Tripp (Karuk, 1945–2022), talk Native American art

== See also ==
- List of forestry universities and colleges
- Humboldt Institute for Interdisciplinary Marijuana Research (HIIMR)
- Cal Poly Humboldt Natural History Museum
