= Marcy Burstiner =

American academic

Marcy Burstiner is a professor of journalism at CalPoly Humboldt. She authored the textbook Investigative Reporting: From Premise to Publication, now in its second edition, published by Taylor Francis in 2018. From 2006 until 2017 she wrote a monthly column called "The Media Maven" on local media and First Amendment issues for the North Coast Journal, an alternative newsweekly based in Eureka, California. She also helped to found the literary magazine Six Hens. She also serves as the Educational News Director for the non-profit organization News Decoder.

Burstiner first started teaching at CalPoly Humboldt as a lecturer and then was hired as a tenure-track professor in 2007. From 2004 to 2018 she taught a class on investigative reporting which would result in a student-produced story in the North Coast Journal. In 2019, the students in her class had published "The Housing Games" which explored the causes and effects of the housing crisis in Humboldt County. In 2011 she was awarded tenure. She served as an ad hoc guest host for Thursday Night Talk on the KHSU radio station. Prior to joining the faculty of HSU she was an assistant managing editor and West Coast Bureau Chief for The Deal, a financial newspaper and web publication from 2000 to 2003. Before that, she was a senior writer for thestreet.com financial news site and a reporter for the Daily Journal in San Francisco, the San Francisco Business Times, the Desert Sun in Palm Springs, California and the Southern Illinoisan in Carbondale, Illinois. She is a graduate of the Columbia University Graduate School of Journalism. She earned a B.A. in political science from Union College, in Schenectady, New York. She grew up in Yonkers, New York.

In 2008, she and her husband, criminal defense attorney Jeffrey Dean Schwartz, founded the Humboldt Center for Constitutional Rights, known as HumRights. The non-profit organization has held a number of education events including a First Amendment essay contest at Sunny Brae Middle School, a "mini-protest" booth at the North Country Fair, a Banned Books Read-Out at the Humboldt State Library and a "HumRights Bar Debate" at Rita's Margherita and Mexican Grill to demonstrate civil dialogue on controversial topics.

== Awards and honors ==
In 2018, the Society of Professional Journalists NorCal chapter awarded Burstiner a James Madison Freedom of Information Award. In 2015 the California Newspaper Publisher's Association named "The Media Maven" Best Column for mid-sized weeklies. In 2014 the Redwood Chapter of the American Civil Liberties Union named her "Patriot of the Year". In 2010, the California Journalism Education Coalition named her Journalism Educator of the Year.
