= Natalie Pawelski =

American journalist

Natalie Pawelski is an American journalist and television correspondent. From 1997 to 2003, she was an environmental correspondent for CNN.

A graduate of Georgetown University and the Columbia School of Journalism, she got her start at CNN working for Headline News as a writer and producer. She eventually became host of the award-winning CNN environment magazine program "Earth Matters." She also worked on the TBS show "News for Kids". In 2003, she was a Nieman Fellow at Harvard University.

From 2006 to March 2010, she was worked as the Vice Consul for Press, Political, and Public Affairs at the British Consulate-General in Atlanta. She left in March 2010 to work for Cater Communications. In 2014, she became a regular guest on Georgia Public Broadcasting's radio show "On Second Thought."
