= La Silla Vacía =

Colombian news website

- Website type: News & blogging
- Available in: Spanish
- Founded: 2009
- Headquarters: Bogotá, D. C., {{{location_country}}}
- Founder: Juanita León
- Key people: Juanita León, Director; Daniel Pacheco, Editor-in-Chief
- Employees: 18
- Website: lasillavacia.com
- Registration: Optional
- Launched: 29 March 2009
- Current status: Active

La Silla Vacía (Spanish: "The Empty Chair") is a Colombian news website founded by journalist and writer Juanita León in 2009. The site focuses primarily on Colombian politics.

La Silla Vacía describes itself as an "informative and interactive medium for people interested in Colombian political current issues," by focusing on "stories which actually describe the way power is exercised in Colombia: on political figures who pull the strings of power, strategies in order to reach and keep it, on ideas and interests which underlie the big decisions taken in the country," aiming to do "good journalism."

== Name ==
Its name, "The Empty Chair" (or, alternatively, "The Empty Seat"), makes reference to at least two political events in Colombia.

The first one occurred 7 January 1999, when the failed peace process between president Andrés Pastrana administration and FARC started. Manuel Marulanda Vélez (a.k.a. Tirofijo / Sureshot), FARC top leader at the time, refused to attend the ceremony held in San Vicente del Caguán, leaving a plastic white chair assigned to him empty.

The second alludes to a proposal prompted by the parapolitics scandal. The idea was to punish lawmakers and ultimately parties involved with illegal armed groups in case they are investigated or arrested, leaving their seats in Congress empty, instead of being replaced with another politician. It was passed by the House of Representatives in May 2009, but it will be enforced only if the lawmaker is sentenced, and it will not apply for current Congresspeople, just as president Álvaro Uribe Vélez wished.

But the founder has said that the name comes from a march of indigenous communities in Cauca who marched through the Pan American road to meet President Uribe and he never went to the encounter. So they left an empty seat for him. "

== Contents ==
The website was originally divided in five big sections:

- Desde la Silla ("From the Chair"): the main stories published on the website. Most of them are journalistic articles or analysis pieces. There are some interviews, including two with presidential pre-candidates for the 2010 elections Sergio Fajardo and Rafael Pardo. These were conducted through a live transmission via internet, with users asking questions using the website, Facebook, and Twitter.
- La Movida del Día: every weekday a question on a current issue is posted by the staff. The question is answered by political figures, analysts, and intellectuals. Users can "endorse" or "not endorse" these answers.
- Querido diario ("Dear diary"): briefs focusing on political gossip.
- El Blogueo ("The Blogging"): blogs by analysts, organizations, and intellectuals, focusing on economy, social responsibility, internet, media, relations with Venezuela, Latin America and the United States, etc.
- La Butaca ("The Stool"): described as a section where "from diverse narrative formats with no limits the other [Colombia] is shown on La Butaca, with their sometimes ironic, acid, or simply different glances."

Now, after its most recent redesign, the sections have changed to:

- Historias: 4 daily investigated and original stories are published
- La Silla Llena: it´s a debate platform where more than 500 experts in different fields blog in their respective networks.
- La Silla Académica: it´s a section dedicated to distribute the knowledge created by the universities subscribed to this service.
- Quién es Quién: it´s the most complete directory of powerful people in Colombia
- Hágame el cruce: it´s the section where the databases of the media are compiled.

User registration is optional for reading the website, but compulsory in order to leave comments.

== Funding ==
La Silla Vacía was originally funded through a series of grants (the grantees include Ford Foundation, Open Society Institute, National Endowment for Democracy and the British Embassy in Colombia), crowdfunding, and several commercial projects. Now less than 30 per cent of its revenues come from grants and most come from crowdfunding and commercial projects.
