= Kathryn Lilley =

- Born: April 22, 1956 (age 68); Washington, D.C.
- Occupation: Novelist
- Subject: Mystery

Kathryn Ellen Lilley (born April 22, 1956) is an American author and former broadcast journalist.

== Early life ==
Lilley was born in Washington, DC, the daughter of Arthur Edward Lilley, emeritus professor of astrophysics at Harvard University, and Margaret Evelyn McPherson Ezell, a retired corporate librarian. She was raised initially in Connecticut and South Carolina, and then transferred to a high school in Cambridge, Massachusetts. She graduated from Wellesley College as a Wellesley Scholar and she later graduated from the Columbia University Graduate School of Journalism.

== Author ==
Lilley writes an adult mystery series called The Fat City Mysteries, featuring investigative journalist Kate Gallagher, a plus-sized TV reporter who is constantly fighting a weight problem that threatens her on-camera career. The Fat City Mysteries are published by Signet/Obsidian, a division of NAL/Penguin Group. The first book in the series, Dying To Be Thin, published in 2007, was an Independent Mystery Booksellers Association (IMBA) bestseller for October, 2007. Other books in the series are A Killer Workout (2008), and Makeovers Can Be Murder (2009). From 2008-2010, she served as a member of the board of directors of the Southern California Chapter of the Mystery Writers of America. Lilley is founder and administrator of the Kill Zone blog, a blog by suspense writers and publishers.

Lilley began her career working as a television reporter at WIS-TV in Columbia, South Carolina, and then shifted to writing fiction. She wrote four young adult mysteries as a contract writer for the Nancy Drew series under the pseudonym Carolyn Keene.

She lives in Manhattan Beach, California.
