= Ralph Judson Palmer =

American newspaper publisher

Ralph Judson Palmer (c. 1943 – July 14, 1971) was a California newspaper publisher and school board member.

Palmer was born around 1943 to Mr. and Mrs. Harlan G. Palmer. He was educated at Fairfax High School and Occidental College, both in Los Angeles, and at the Columbia University School of Journalism. He was a naval officer during World War II, after which he was publisher of community newspapers in Reseda, Canoga Park, Chatsorth, and Tarzana, all in Los Angeles.

When his father died in 1956, the younger Palmer took over as publisher of the Hollywood Citizen-News until the property was sold to Lammot duPont Copeland Jr. in 1961. He was owner and publisher of the Carlsbad Journal from 1962 until 1968 and was on the school board of the Oceanside-Carlsbad High School District.

Palmer died on July 14, 1971, while vacationing with his family at Mammoth Lakes, California.
