= Giant (magazine) =

Men's magazine

May 2007 cover of Giant magazine featuring singer Rihanna

Giant (stylized as GIANT) was a men's magazine based in New York City geared to the urban music market. It began in October 2004 as a bimonthly publication catering to the interests of 20-something men, focusing on pop culture including reviews of video games, movies, fine tobacco, music, everyday happenings and celebrity interviews.

In August 2006, the magazine had a makeover under new editor-in-chief Smokey Fontaine, formerly of the hip hop magazine America. Under his leadership, the magazine began to focus on music, lifestyle, and entertainment for the urban reader. Later, Emil Wilbekin served as the standing Editor-In-Chief.

Covers included Beyoncé, Pharrell, Diddy, The Killers, Ciara, Jennifer Hudson, Janet Jackson, and Eve. The June/July issue offered two covers: one of R&B artist Robin Thicke and one of Rihanna. Chris Brown and Prince have also appeared on the cover. Along with the magazine, Giant's website serves as a blog for readers to find additional information on artists that have been featured in the magazine, as well as contests and giveaways.

Radio One, the radio empire started by Cathy Hughes and now presided over by her son, Alfred Liggins, purchased the magazine in January 2007 for a reported $270,000. Giant was Radio One's first foray into the print media market. The magazine ceased publication in December 2009.
