= Wu Chuntao =

Chinese author and journalist

Wu Chuntao (Chinese: 吴春桃; Chinese: 吳春桃; pinyin: Wú Chūntáo) is a Chinese author and journalist best known for co-authoring the award-winning Will the Boat Sink the Water (also known as A Survey of Chinese Peasants) with her husband, Chen Guidi. Born into a peasant family in rural Hunan province in 1963, Wu is a member of the Hefei Literature Association, and a recipient of 2004 Lettre Ulysses Award. Her investigative reportage has also earned her recognition from the U.S.-based journal Contemporary Age.

== Career ==
Wu met Chen Guidi while attending a writers' conference in Beijing in 1991. Although he was twenty years her senior and already a well established novelist and playwright, Wu was critical of Chen's writing style—particularly the authenticity of his female characters. The two established a rapport, and were married soon thereafter. They began working on collaborative writing projects, and in 2001 travelled to Anhui province to investigate the life of rural peasants. Over the course of their survey, the couple interviewed thousands of peasants in over 50 towns, collecting accounts of grinding poverty and official corruption. In late 2003, they published the results of their investigation, titled A Survey of Chinese Peasants (Zhongguo Nongmin Diaocha), in a literary magazine. Copies quickly sold out, and in early 2004 the study was published in book format, selling nearly 200,000 copies in under two months. In March 2004, the book was banned in the People's Republic of China. Despite the ban, it became an "underground mega-bestseller," according to the Asia Times, selling more than 7 million unlicensed copies as of 2005.

Soon after the book's publication, local Communist Party official Zhang Xide sued Chen and Wu for libel, seeking 200,000 yuan in damages. Zhang had been described in the book as unpopular, corrupt, and oppressive towards petitioners and peasants. Villagers assembled in the courtroom to corroborate the accounts provided in Chen and Wu's book. At the end of the trial, the judge declined to offer a verdict.
