= Danny Herrera (strongman) =

American powerlifter (1937–2008)

Danny Herrera (July 29, 1937 – April 25, 2008) was an American powerlifter from East Los Angeles, California.

== Biography ==
Herrera started lifting weights at fifteen years old and continued working out intermittently through his adult life.

== Background ==
Herrera graduated in 1956 from Garfield High School in East Los Angeles. He then studied Industrial Arts at Humboldt State College in Arcata, California, graduating with a BA in 1962. Since 1962 he worked as an educator in Los Angeles area high schools.

== Records - Masters (65-69 years old), 275 lb class ==
- Amateur Athletic Union, World Fullpower Powerlifting Championship (Richmond, VA) October 2002
  - Squat- 507 lb.
  - Bench- 424 lb.
  - Dead Lift- 485 lb.
- Amateur Athletic Union, World Bench Championship (Laughlin, NV) December 2002 - 440 lb.
- United States Powerlifting Federation, West Coast Championship (Venice, CA) September 2003
  - Squat- 540 lb.
  - Bench- 418 lb.
  - Dead Lift- 502 lb.
- USA PowerLifting, California State Championship (Napa, CA) October 2003
  - Bench- 418 lb.
- United States Powerlifting Federation, Venice Beach Classic (Venice, CA) September 2005
  - Bench- 425 lb.
- World Association of Benchers and Deadlifters, World Bench Championship (Reno, NV) November 2005
  - Bench-418 lb.
