= Emil Wilbekin =

American journalist

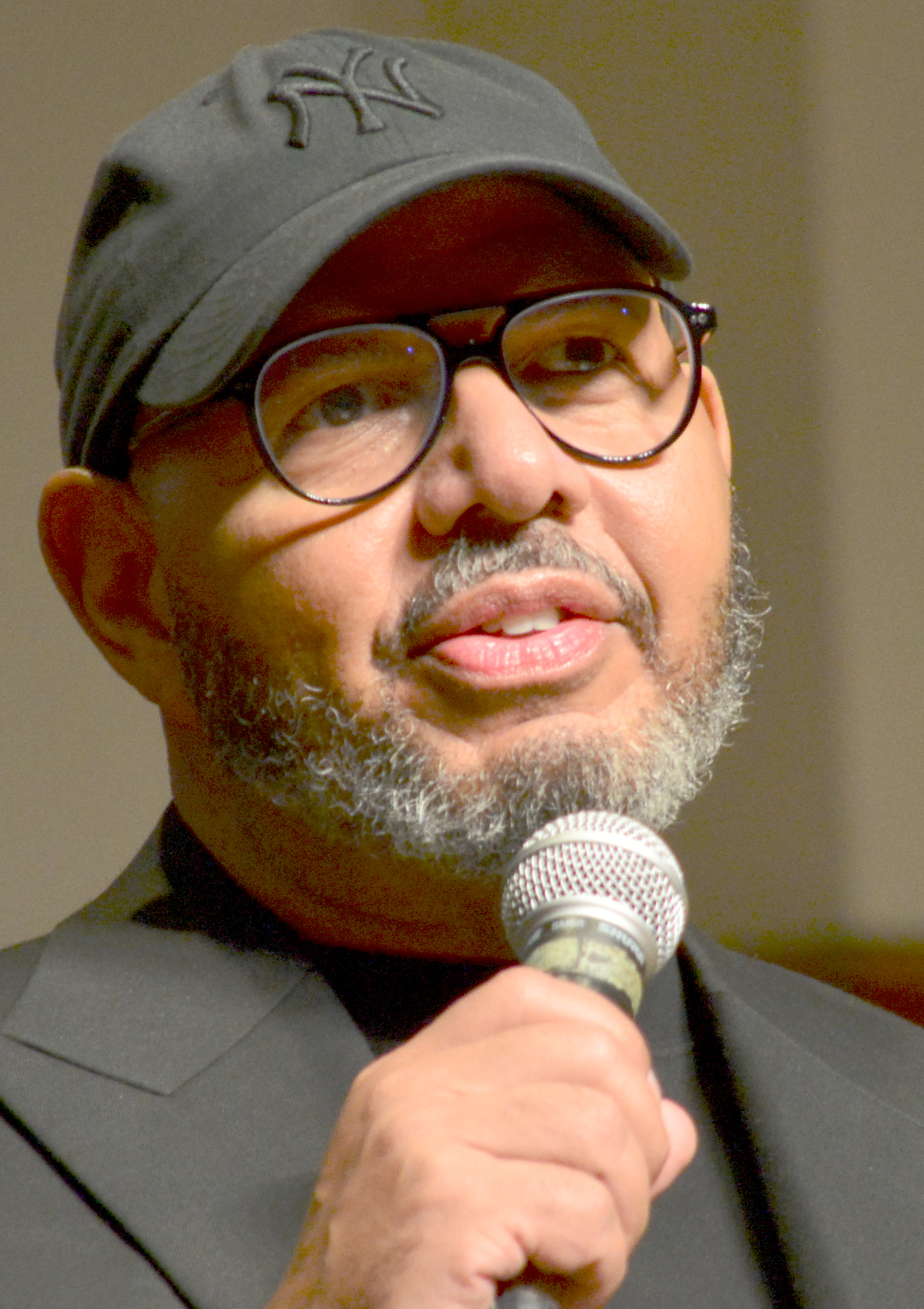
- Wilbekin in 2025
- Born: September 16, 1967 (age 59); Cincinnati, Ohio
- Occupations: journalist, media executive, stylist, content creator, culture critic, human rights activist
- Years active: 1990-present
- Known for: Former editor-in-chief of Vibe and Giant, editor-at-large at Essence

Emil Wilbekin (born September 16, 1967, in Cincinnati, Ohio) is an American journalist, media executive, stylist, content creator, culture critic, and human rights activist. He is the former editor-in-chief of Vibe and Giant, editor-at-large at Essence and managing editor of its associated website Essence.com, and chief content officer of Afropunk. He is the founder of Native Son Now, an organization dedicated to empowering and lifting up black gay men through positive representation and business opportunities.

== Early life and education ==
Wilbekin was adopted into a Black family of legal professionals in Cincinnati as a baby. His father, Harvey Earl Wilbekin, became an attorney after working as a structural engineer, while his mother, Dr. Cleota P. Wilbekin, went from working as a sociologist and an attorney to becoming a law judge for the State of Ohio Department of Human Services. Along with his older brother Erik, the family lived a comfortable life.

Wilbekin attended college at Hampton University where he served as editor-in-chief of Hampton Script, the school's newspaper. After graduating in 1989 with a B.S. in mass media arts, Wilbekin attended Columbia University's Graduate School of Journalism where he attained an M.S. in journalism in 1990.

== Career ==
Wilbekin spent his first two years out of grad school as a freelance journalist writing for New York Times, Chicago Tribune, Metropolitan Home, Los Angeles Times, and Associated Press. In 1992, while vacationing with four friends in the Hamptons—Jonathan Van Meter, Diane Cardwell, Ricky Lee, and Gilbert Rogin—Wilbekin participated in developing ideas for a magazine dedicated to covering hip-hop music and Black culture. After acquiring Quincy Jones' backing, that idea was brought to life as Vibe magazine with Wilbekin serving as one of the publication's first editors.

Wilbekin began his tenure at Vibe working on its "Next" section, focusing primarily on music, with his first cover story featuring Mary J. Blige. He was promoted to style editor in 1995 and made the magazine's fashion editorial director in 1997. In July 1999, he became the fashion editorial director of Vibe's two sister publications, Spin and Blaze, as well. The next month, Danyel Smith departed to join Time magazine, and Wilbekin was promoted to editor-in-chief of Vibe. Throughout the year 2000, he oversaw expansion of readership and the creation of the magazine's supplemental focused solely on women called HomeGirls. That year, he was noted for bridging the gap between hip-hop and its previously ignored gay fan base by including stories about the community within the magazine. Wilbekin also confronted homophobia in the art form by making sure that Dr. Dre and Eminem addressed their homophobic lyrics when they appeared on the September 2000 cover of Vibe. In a 2001 interview with New York magazine, Wilbekin emphasized that his job was not to police rappers over their comments about the gay community but "to make sure that homosexuality is dealt with as fairly as anything else."

Under his direction, Vibe was nominated for the 2001 National Magazine Award (AKA "The Ellie") for best photography. The following year, Vibe won "The Ellie" for general excellence of magazines circulating between 500,000 and one million readers, beating out competition from The New Yorker, Wired, Gourmet, and Jane for the top prize. The win led to his being named to Out magazine's Out 100 list and being profiled by The New York Times, where he addressed his facing no problems as an openly gay man in the hip-hop industry. He produced the 2003 Vibe Awards, which led to his being promoted to editorial director of Vibe Media's overall operations that September. After 12 years of service, he departed Vibe in July 2004 to join Marc Ecko's brand as vice president of development and to serve on Complex magazine's editorial board.

Wilbekin joined Giant magazine as editor-in-chief in 2008, then jumped to Essence.com as managing editor in 2009, becoming editor-at-large of Essence magazine in 2012. Part of his contributions to the publication included a column focused on cultural events and interviews with celebrities such as Viola Davis, Angela Bassett, Puff Daddy, Yolanda Adams, and Anita Baker. He also expanded the publication's purview to cover same-gender-loving relationships within the Black community. This included the magazine's first profile of a lesbian couple in its 40-year history for its "Bridal Bliss" section. The coverage resulted in the publication winning a 2011 GLAAD Award for outstanding digital journalism. He left the publication in 2014 to focus on promoting LGBTQ+ representation across media platforms by starting his consultancy and branding agency, World of Wilbekin. Concurrent with this work, he served as Afropunk's chief content officer from 2018 until 2020. His time at Afropunk was dedicated to turning the organization into a safe place for Black queer people. He departed Afropunk to work exclusively on empowering the Black gay community in 2020.

Throughout his career, Wilbekin has worked as a cultural critic and commentator, speaking about fashion, music, LGBTQ+ people, Black lives, HIV, activism, racism, and celebrities with a wide range of publications including New York Times, Los Angeles Times, Washington Post, New York, Associated Press, MTV, PBS, ABC News, CNN, The Guardian, Village Voice, New York Observer, Women's Wear Daily, Politico, Variety, Billboard, Chicago Tribune, McCall's, BET, Reuters, Quartz, Wall Street Journal, Forbes, and E! Online. Due to his standing within the music industry, he has been called upon to speak about the passing of notable artists. On August 21, 2001, he spoke with CNN about passing of Aaliyah. He live-blogged Michael Jackson's memorial service on July 7, 2009, for Entertainment Weekly. On August 31, 2018, he provided commentary for BET's broadcast of Aretha Franklin's funeral service. He spoke with WNYC about the passing of Andre Harrell on May 13, 2020.

He also weighed in on Kanye West's interruption of Taylor Swift's acceptance speech for the Best Video Award at the 2009 MTV Music Video Awards, saying that it was not West's place to speak for Beyoncé; participated in VH1's Love & Hip Hop: "Out in Hip-Hop" round table discussion on homophobia in the hip-hop community; and chastised the New York Post's comparison of President Barack Obama with a chimpanzee.

== Native Son Now ==
In 2015, while he was on vacation in India, Wilbekin began to have thoughts about transforming World of Wilbekin from a branding agency into a movement. During the trip, he realized that Black gay men lacked unity around fellowship, networking, and celebrating one another. Upon returning to New York, he was inspired to redress this issue while re-reading James Baldwin's Notes of a Native Son. After writing an essay about feeling unsafe and demonized as a Black gay man in response to the Orlando nightclub shooting, he began to transform World of Wilbekin into a full-fledged advocacy organization dedicated to supporting Black queer men of all backgrounds. He named the organization Native Son Now in honor of Baldwin's book.

Native Son Now was officially launched with an awards ceremony that celebrated the achievements of Black gay men in 2016. Its honorees included Don Lemon, George C. Wolfe, and DeRay McKesson. At that inaugural celebration, Wilbekin revealed his HIV status publicly for the first time because he did not feel that it was right to hide while asking others to reveal themselves. In an effort to destigmatize HIV within the Black community, he partnered with ViiV Healthcare on producing an immersive theatre piece that raised awareness about the virus. The piece, As Much As I Can, debuted in 2017. Wilbekin continued his focus on promoting the Black queer community by partnering with Google to create an event focused on Black gay men in the tech industry;. partnering with Bloomingdale's to create Native Son Now inspired gay pride merchandise; collaborating with Scotch Porter's "Embracing Masculinity: #DareToCare" campaign, which focused on challenging toxic masculinity. and producing encore performances of "As Much As I Can" with a constant push on eliminating HIV stigma.

In 2020, Native Son Now joined forces with Human Rights Campaign and Color Of Change to push for the release of data on COVID-19 in order to address the disproportionate effect that the virus was having on Black communities across the United States. Responding to the pandemic's effect on same-gender-loving Black men in particular, Wilbekin launched The Black Gay Leadership Forum—the world's first virtual gathering of its kind—which featured 100 Black gay thought leaders, activists, media personalities, business executives, and academics in conversation about staying connected during the period of forced isolation. This focus on promoting Black gay men as a community during the 2020 pandemic expanded to include Black gay innovation in fashion, Wilbekin's serving as creative consultant on and helping to produce Darnell L. Moore's Being Seen podcast—which also focused on elevating the achievements of Black gay men—participating in the Academy Award's Academy Dialogues; Native Son, the 2020 Native Son Awards which honored Edward Eninful, Lee Daniels, André De Shields, Rashad Robinson, and Billy Porter, and culminated with the release of the Native Son 101, the world's first list of over 101 successful Black gay men from numerous industries.

== Awards and honors ==
Since launching Native Son Now, Wilbekin has been hailed as a 2016 Black Enterprise Modern Man, given the 2017 "Master of Style" award by Out magazine and Cadillac, honored by the Boy Scouts of America with the 2017 Harlem Good Scout Award, awarded GLAAD's 2018 Ric Weiland Award, named one of Fast Company's Most Creative People of 2019, awarded ADColor's 2019 Advocate Award, declared HIV Plus' 2019 #1 most amazing person living with HIV, named a Renaissance Man by TheBody.com, and honored at Cincinnati's 2020 Black gay Pride.

== Personal life ==
Wilbekin is openly gay and living with HIV. He has stated that coming out to his family was difficult, but that they were able to move past the shock with help from his older brother, Erik. Wilbekin is a Christian and a Universal Life minister.
