= Juanita León =

Colombian journalist, writer, and public speaker

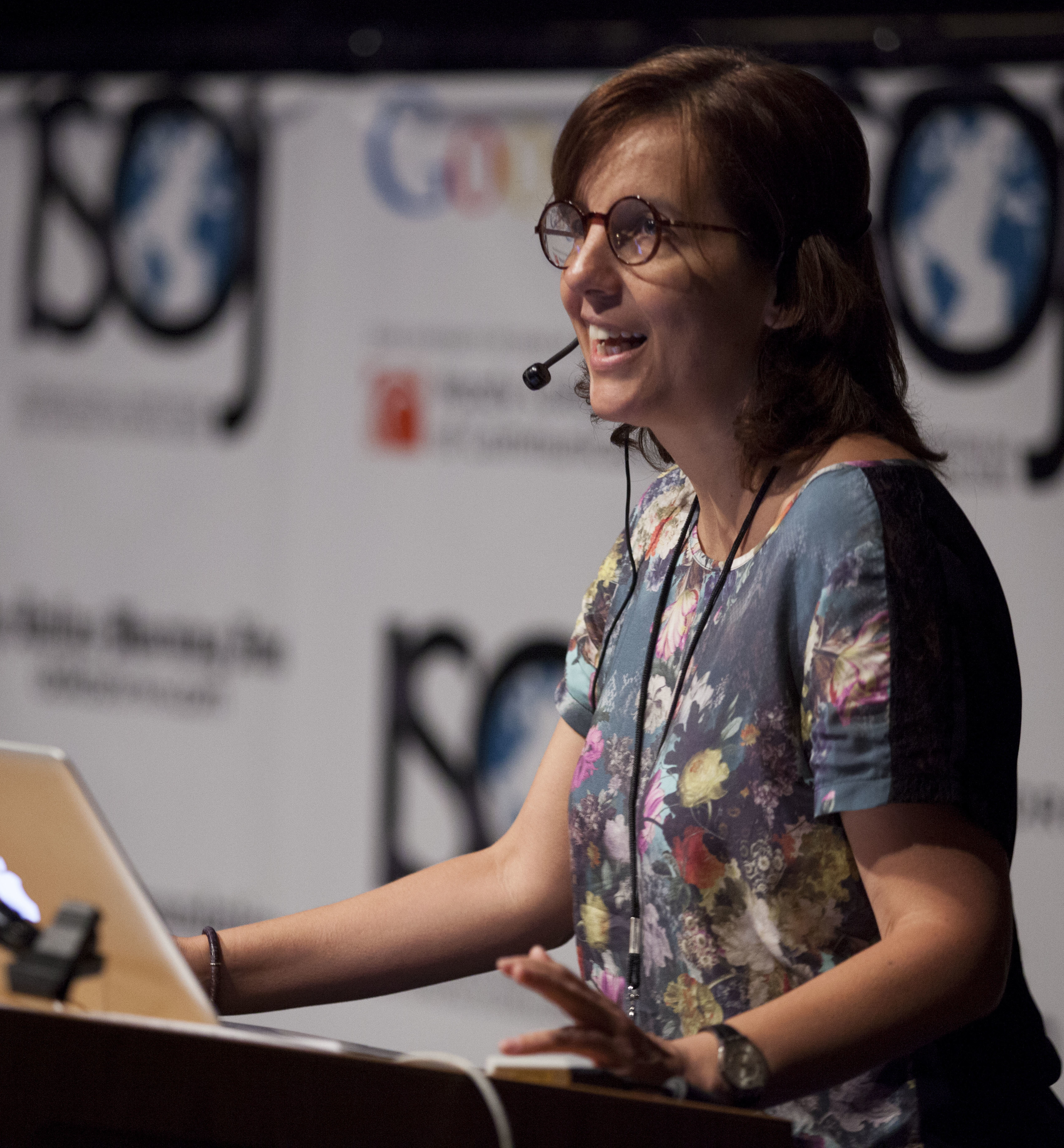
León in 2014

Juanita León García (born 1970) is a Colombian journalist, writer, and public speaker. She is best known as the founder and director of the news website La Silla Vacía.

== Biography ==
León obtained a law degree at the University of the Andes in Bogotá and an M.S. in Journalism from the Graduate School of Journalism at Columbia University in New York. She worked as a reporter on the Wall Street Journal Americas before returning to Colombia in 1998.

In Colombia, León worked for the newspaper El Tiempo and for Semana magazine. She was editor-in-chief of the weekly's website and collaborated with the TV series Tiempos difíciles and Regreso a la Esperanza.

In 2006, she returned to the United States as a Nieman Fellow at Harvard University. In 2008, she helped launch an alternative online news magazine Flyp.

In 2009, León obtained a grant from the Open Society Foundations. With this grant and her share in her family's food production firm, León founded La Silla Vacía, a news website focused on Colombian politics. In 2016, León and several of her family members appeared in the Panama Papers, which revealed that hundreds of Colombia's elite families held their capital in off-shore accounts. On her news website, León showed that her investment in Panama was legal and known to the Colombian tax office, and declared her conflict of interest in reporting on the Panama Papers.

She was an Academic Visitor at St Antony's College, Oxford and the Latin American Centre at the University of Oxford from 2018 to 2019.

== Awards ==
- World Health Organization's World Prize for Health Journalism (2001, for an article on the health risks posed by the conflict in Colombia)
- Fundación para un Nuevo Periodismo Iberoamericano - Cemex journalism prize (2002, finalist)
- Lettre Ulysses Award (2006, 3rd prize for the book País de Plomo: Crónicas de Guerra)
- Premio Gabriel García Márquez de Periodismo [Gabriel Garcá Márquez Journalism Award] (2016, Coverage Category, for a series of stories on the peace negotiations between the Colombian government and the FARC)

== Bibliography ==
- Años de Fuego [Years of Fire] (2001) (editor)
- No Somos Machos Pero Somos Muchos [We Are Not Machos But We Are Many] (2004)
- País de Plomo: Crónicas de Guerra [Country of Bullets: War Diaries] (2005)
- Los Súperpoderosos [The Superpowerful] (2014) (co-authored with the La Silla Vacía team)
- El Dulce Poder: Así Funciona La Política en Colombia [Sweet Power: This Is How Politics Works in Colombia] (2017) (co-authored with the La Silla Vacía team)
