= Sisters Working in Film and Television =

South African non-profit organization

Sisters Working in Film and Television (SWIFT) is a South African non-profit organization created in 2016 that promotes equality in the historically male-dominated film industry and offers women the opportunity to promote each other and network. The organization is supported by the KwaZulu-Natal Film Commission.

SWIFT was established in 2016 during the Durban International Film Festival, the filmmaker and producer Sara Blecher is regarded the founder and co-founder Flavia Motsisi as the Head of Skills and Mentorship and Zoe Ramushu is the spokeswoman of the organisation. The organization brings to the public the various obstacles women in the film and television industries encounter. The organization issued a research in 2017, according to which over two thirds of the women surveyed were groped or further harassed at their workplace against their permission. As a result, SWIFT began the #ThatsNotOkay campaign, which uses videos to draw attention to sexual assault and sexualised violence in the film industry. In addition, the organization formed its own Code of Conduct, which is also observed by other organizations in the film industry. The Independent Producers Organization (IPO) has adopted the code as obligatory for all members. One of the goals of SWIFT is to establish comparable ideas in law. In 2018, SWIFT sent a delegation of women filmmakers from South Africa to the Berlinale for the first time.
