= Jonathan Harounoff =

British Journalist

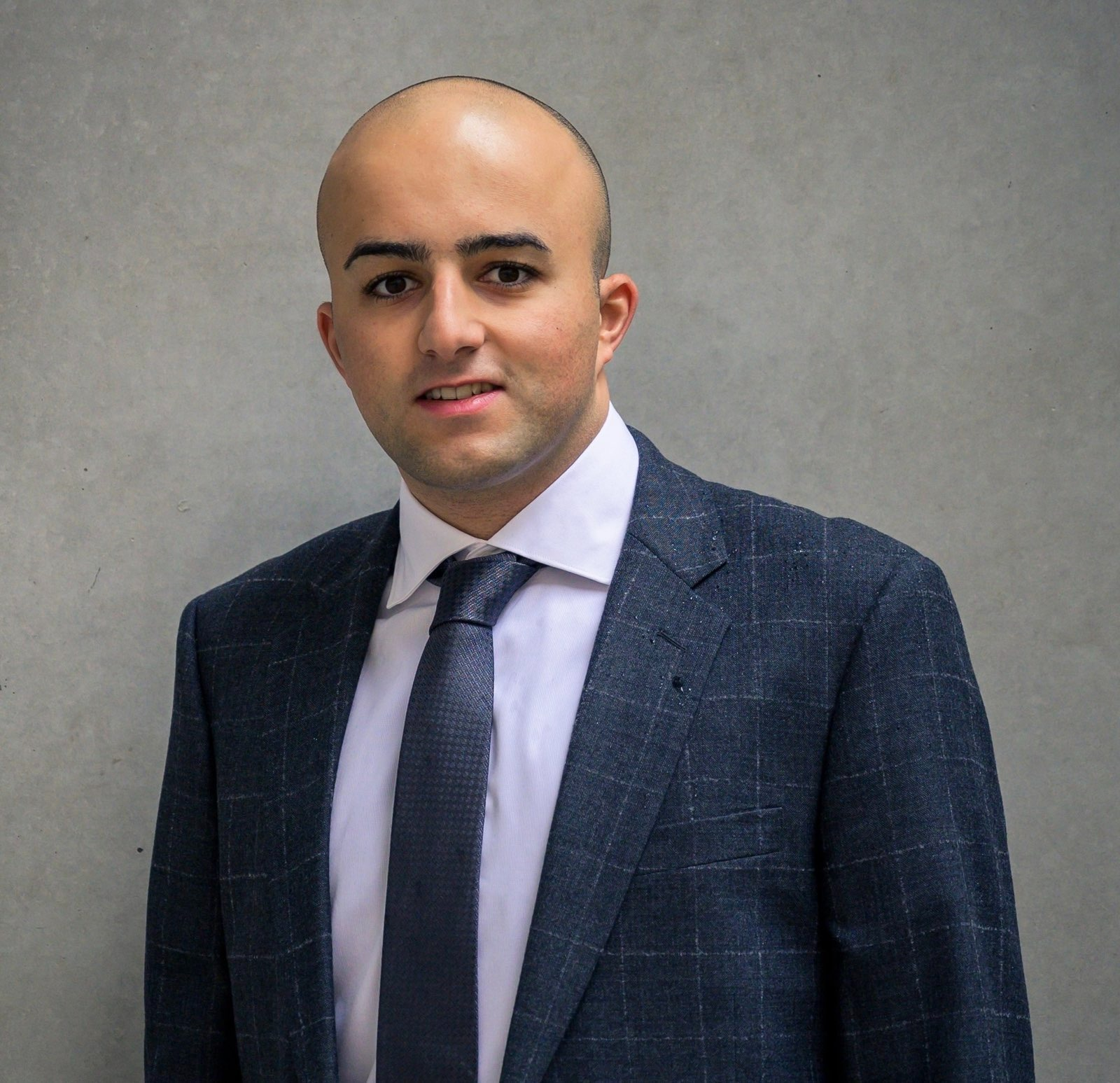
- Jonathan Harounoff
- Born: London, United Kingdom
- Education: University of Cambridge, Columbia University, Harvard University
- Occupation: Israel’s International Spokesperson to the United Nations
- Spouse: Stephanie Posner

Jonathan Harounoff is a British journalist covering the Middle East, who has been serving as Israel's International Spokesperson to the United Nations since September 2024. He is a contributing writer at The New York Post, Fox News, Haaretz, The Jerusalem Post, The Jewish Chronicle, The Forward, JNS and The Middle East Institute, where he writes about Iran, Israel and antisemitism. His reporting and commentaries have appeared in international publications and TV, including BBC, NPR, Fox News, MSNBC, The Telegraph, Iran International, The Los Angeles Times, The Sean Hannity Show and NewsNation.

== Early life and education ==
Harounoff was born in London, United Kingdom, the son of Israeli and British parents, and is of Iranian-Jewish ancestry. He attended Jesus College University of Cambridge, where he was an Exhibitioner Scholar, graduating with a bachelor's degree in Arabic, Persian and Middle Eastern Studies in 2017. He then moved to the United States to complete graduate studies in international relations, journalism and diplomacy at Harvard University in 2018, while also writing for The Harvard Crimson and Harvard Gazette. In 2019, he received his master's degree from Columbia Journalism School, where he served as managing editor of two college publications: Trumplandia and Covering Religion. He also founded and captained Columbia Journalism School's first-ever soccer team. Harounoff is a 2019 Journalism Fellow at the Fellowships at Auschwitz for the Study of Professional Ethics (FASPE).

== Career ==
Following graduation from Columbia Journalism School in 2019, Harounoff worked in corporate communications for the chairman and CEO of XPO Logistics, a Fortune 500 provider of transportation and supply chain services. In June 2023, Harounoff became a columnist at London-based publication The Jewish Chronicle. In September 2023, Harounoff became director of communications at the Jewish Institute for National Security of America (JINSA), a foreign affairs think tank based in Washington, D.C. At the same time, in September 2023, Harounoff founded and served as CEO of Noff Media, a media consultancy for businesses, non-governmental organizations and high-profile individuals. In September 2024, he became Israel's international spokesperson to the United Nations, serving under Israeli ambassador to the United Nations Danny Danon.

He stepped down as International Spokesperson in July 2026.

In September 2026, he launched a YouTube show called “UNSCRIPTED with Jonathan Harounoff.”

== Books ==
Harounoff is the author of Unveiled: Inside Iran's #WomanLifeFreedom Revolt, published in September 2025.

The book includes interviews with Iranians inside Iran and in the diaspora who participated in the 2022-2023 Woman, Life, Freedom uprising following the death of Mahsa Amini.

== Personal life ==
Harounoff is married to Stephanie Posner, a tech executive at DoubleVerify. They got married on August 25, 2024 at Jesus College, Cambridge, in what was reported to be the college's first Jewish wedding in its 500-year history.
