= Chen Guidi =

Chinese writer

Chen Guidi (Chinese: 陳桂棣; Pinyin: Chén Guìdì; born November 1942) is a Chinese writer from Huaiyuan county, Anhui. The book A Survey of the Chinese Peasants (中国农民调查 / 中國農民調查 Zhōngguó Nóngmín Diàochá) which he co-wrote with his wife Wu Chuntao (born 1963) was published in January 2004 but banned by the Communist Party in March of that year. It nevertheless won the 2004 Lettre Ulysses Award. It has been retitled and reprinted in English as Will the Boat Sink the Water.
