= Lettre Ulysses Award =

Literary award for the best texts in the genre of literary reportage

The Lettre Ulysses Award for the Art of Reportage was given annually between 2003 and 2006 for the best texts in the genre of literary reportage, which must have been first published during the previous two years. The award was initiated by Lettre International in Berlin, and was organized by the Foundation Lettre International Award, a joint partnership between Lettre International and the Aventis Foundation. The Goethe-Institut also cooperates with the project.

A polyglot jury of experienced writers representing eleven of the major linguistic regions of the world sought the best international texts in the genre and decides on a shortlist of seven, eventually choosing three winners from among them. The members of the jury were appointed by the organizer. In addition, an advisory committee of distinguished writers lent its moral and intellectual backing to the Lettre Ulysses Award. Members of the committee have included Günter Grass, the German writer and winner of the 1999 Nobel Prize in Literature, the Polish reportage author Ryszard Kapuściński, the French ethnologist Jean Malaurie, and the Belarusian writer Svetlana Aleksievich.

The Lettre Ulysses Award was the first world prize in the reportage genre.

The initiative ended in 2007, after the contract between the Foundation Lettre International Award and the Aventis Foundation ended and the foundation did not succeed in finding a new partner.

== Award ceremony and prizes ==
The prize winners were announced at a public award ceremony in Berlin on the Saturday before the opening of the international Frankfurt Book Fair. The winners of the first, second and third prizes were given cash awards amounting to $50,000, $30,000 and US$20,000, respectively. Residencies in Berlin were awarded to the other four finalists.

== Mission ==
The Lettre Ulysses Award aimed to:

...bring the world's attention to texts of literary reportage that are extraordinary in terms of their quality, relevance and artistic value; to provide symbolic, moral, and financial support to writers of literary reportage; to encourage world-ranking journalists and writers to continue their efforts. By facilitating the translation and publication of texts from places and languages less integrated in the international publishing market, the project aims to shed light on otherwise lesser known topics and issues.

Furthermore, by providing a platform for these texts, the award contributes to an awareness of the world and of the simultaneity of diverse and contradictory cultures, mentalities, values, living conditions and dynamics.

Finally, to establish: a laboratory for the genre; a reference point for excellent literary reportage for publishers, authors, translators; a detector of relevant themes; a platform for reporters and journalists, allowing for exchange, cooperation and discussion

== Nomination and selection process ==
The jury was composed of writers and journalists who work within the reportage genre. Their conference language was English, but they are native speakers drawn from the world's largest linguistic regions and as such guarantee the broadest possible language base. Each jury member was able to make up to two nominations for the award. Although it was likely that jury members will nominate from their own language group, in practice they can nominate works written in whichever languages they read. The composition of the jury and the languages represented was subject to partial annual change.

Each jury member justified his or her nominations in a written proposal accompanied by extracts of each text. These were, if necessary, translated into English and sent out to each jury member. Following the nominations, the first jury meeting would be held. The number of nominees was reduced and a shortlist is drawn up after discussions centering on the criteria: relevance of subject; originality; complexity; credibility and authenticity; structure; language and style; and whatever other elements make a particular work outstanding. The shortlist contains seven texts. These texts were then translated in their entirety, if necessary, and sent to all jury members. The final decisions would be made after all candidate texts have been entirely and thoroughly read by each and every jury member.

== Winners ==
=== 2003 ===
- 1st prize. Anna Politkovskaya, Tchétchénie: le déshonneur russe, (Buchet/Chastel, Paris, 2003).
- 2nd prize. Nuruddin Farah, Yesterday Tomorrow: Voices from the Somali Diaspora, (Continuum International, London, New York, 2000).
- 3rd prize. Jiang Hao, Revealing the Secrets of Poachers, (Qunzhong chubansche, Beijing, 2000).

=== 2004 ===
- 1st prize. Chen Guidi and Wu Chuntao, Survey of Chinese Peasants, (People's Literature Publication Company, Beijing 2003).
- 2nd prize. Tracy Kidder, Mountains Beyond Mountains: The Quest of Dr. Paul Farmer, a Man Who Would Cure the World, (Random House, New York, 2003).
- 3rd prize. Daniel Bergner, Soldiers of Light (Allen Lane/Penguin, London, 2004).

=== 2005 ===
- 1st prize. Alexandra Fuller, Scribbling the Cat. Travels with an African Soldier, (Penguin Press, New York, 2004).
- 2nd prize. Abdellah Hammoudi, Une saison à la Mecque. Récit de pèlerinage, (Seuil, Paris, 2004) [A Season in Mecca. Account of a Pilgrimage].
- 3rd prize. Riverbend, Baghdad Burning. Girl Blog from Iraq, (The Feminist Press, New York, 2005. Published in the UK by Marion Boyars Publishers, London, 2005).

=== 2006 ===
- 1st prize. Linda Grant, The People on the Street. A Writer’s View of Israel, (Virago Press, London, 2006).
- 2nd prize. Érik Orsenna, Voyage aux pays du coton. Petit précis de mondialisation, (Fayard, Paris, 2006) [Journey to the Lands of Cotton. A Brief Manual of Globalisation].
- 3rd prize. Juanita León, País de plomo. Crónicas de guerra, (Aguilar, 2005) [Country of Bullets. War Diaries].

== See also ==
- Reportage
- Creative nonfiction
- New Journalism
- Lettre International (Berlin)
