= Ali Mustafa (journalist) =

Canadian photographer, journalist and writer (1984 - 2014)

- Born: June 18, 1984; Toronto, Ontario
- Died: March 9, 2014 (aged 29); Aleppo, Syria
- Cause of death: Aerial bombing
- Monuments: Ali Mustafa Memorial Collective
- Other name: The People's Journalist
- Citizenship: Pakistani & Canadian
- Education: York University
- Occupations: Freelance photographer and journalist
- Known for: photography works and films documenting the conflicts in Syria, Egypt, Palestine, Brazil and Canada
- Notable work: "Syria, March–April 2013", "Palestine, July–September 2011", "Battle of Tahrir Square, November 2011"
- Movement: Activism
- Relatives: Justina Rosa Botelho
- Website: http://RememberingAliMustafa.org/

Ali Mustafa (July 18, 1984 – March 9, 2014), was a Canadian freelance photographer, multi-media journalist and writer based in Toronto, Ontario, Canada. He was killed along with seven others on March 9, 2014, in Aleppo, Syria, in an aerial bombing carried out by the Assad government.

== Personal ==
Ali Mustafa was born in Toronto, Canada, on July 18, 1984. He attended York University and obtained a bachelor's degree in political science.

== Career ==
Ali's photographs documented social justice issues in Brazil, Syria, Egypt, Palestine, and Canada. Working as a freelance photojournalist, he did not have much institutional support. He was also a documentary filmmaker. Some of his documentaries are "Aftermath of the Port Said Massacre: Ultras Strike Back," "Syria's War: The View from Turkey," and "Interview with Mohammad Mahjoub."

== Death ==
Aleppo is the northern city where Mustafa's death took place. Damascus is the capital of Syria.

Mustafa was killed in a bombing while documenting the civil war in Aleppo, Syria. A barrel bomb was dropped by the Syrian military on the rebel-controlled Haydariah area of Aleppo. Mustafa along with seven others were killed during this bombing. During the attack that killed him, he was with a civilian rescue team.

== Impact ==
Since its civil war began, Syria has become one of the world's most dangerous places for journalists. Dozens of journalists have been killed. Syria is the country with the second highest number of journalists killed since 1992. Ali's death has been added to a long list of journalists killed in the field. In his work as a freelance photojournalist and activist, he struggled alongside the oppressed subjects of his work, regardless of the cost to himself. Journalists before Mustafa and after will continue to travel and put themselves in dangerous positions in order to "cover the gaps that are missing in mainstream media."

== Reactions ==
Irina Bokova, director-general of UNESCO, said, "I am deeply concerned by the death of Abdul Qader and Ali Mostafa [sic], two media professionals whose names are to be added to the all too long list of civilian victims in Syria. It is essential that journalists be able to report on difficult situations and I urge all parties to help media workers do their work as well as possible, even in the extreme conditions they face in Syria."

The Ali Mustafa Memorial Collective hosted an exhibit of Mustafa's photographic work from Syria in 2016 and said, "Mustafa’s reporting expanded far beyond stories of death, displacement and destruction. Instead, his intimate portraits of Syrians living and resisting in the face of devastation were guided by a commitment to show, above of all, people’s strength, survival and resilience against all odds. More than a mere vocation, photojournalism represented for Mustafa a tool for realizing his radical vision of social justice. Through his principled people’s journalism, he worked to sow the seeds for what he called ‘genuine people-to-people solidarity."

After his death, his friend Donya Ziaee said, "He didn’t just do journalism or photojournalism as a matter of curiosity or vocation. Every location he chose to cover was for him part of his political activism. It was a show of solidarity with the people whose struggles he was covering."

== See also ==
- List of journalists killed during the Syrian Civil War
- Syrian Civil War
- Freelance journalist
- Barrel bomb
- World Central Kitchen drone strikes
