= Elizabeth Benjamin (journalist) =

American journalist

Elizabeth Benjamin (born c. 1972) is currently a managing director at Marathon Strategies, a communications and strategy firm in New York, and was a journalist with what was then Time Warner Cable News (TWCN), serving as the editor-in-chief of "State of Politics," a blog covering the politics of the state of New York, and as the host of the daily political news and interview show Capital Tonight . She was employed with TWCN's predecessor YNN and NY1, starting in 2011. Prior to this, she wrote a column for the New York Daily News, also covering state and city politics. Before her position at the News, she reported for the Albany Times-Union and blogged under its Capitol Confidential blog.

Benjamin currently appears as a political pundit on radio shows such as WNYC's the Brian Lehrer Show and on TV shows on channels such as CUNY-TV and NY1; in addition to her regular blog for TWCN, she also serves as a semi-regular columnist for the online publication Capital New York.

In 2013, she married Steven Smith, spokesman for the Albany police department. The two had met at a news conference earlier that year. Smith, then training for his first-ever triathlon, was directed towards Benjamin, a past Ironman participant who has a tattoo from that event on her leg. They began training together and eventually dating. New York's chief judge, Jonathan Lippman, officiated at the ceremony, held in Poughkeepsie.

== Awards ==
- 2009 Hal Hovey Award
