= Paul Janensch =

American journalist and playwright (1938–2025)

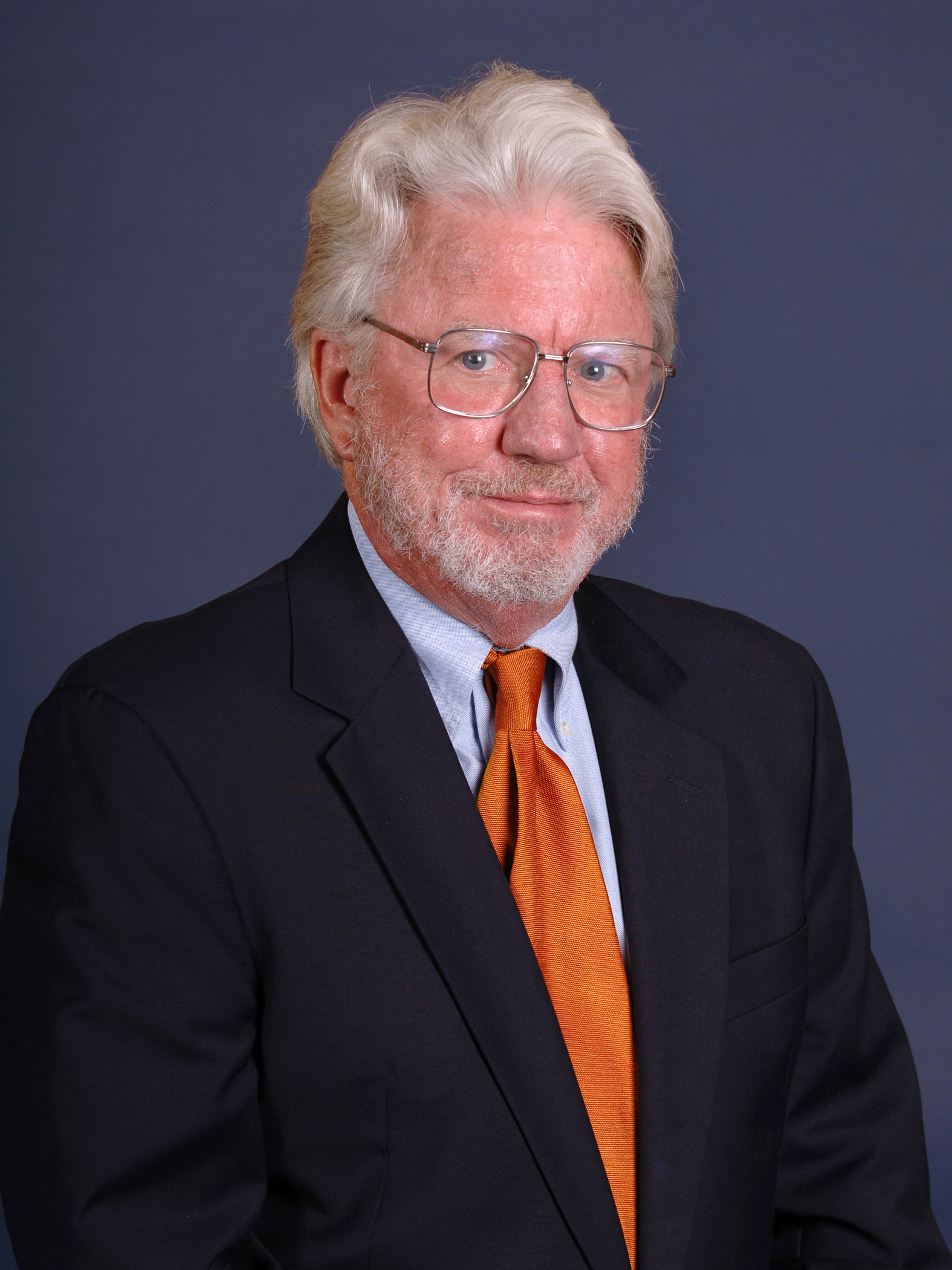
- Janensch in 2007
- Born: Carl Paul Janensch, Jr. November 26, 1938; Evanston, Illinois, U.S.
- Died: July 15, 2025 (aged 86); Bridgeport, Connecticut, U.S.
- Education: Georgetown University; Columbia University Graduate School of Journalism
- Occupations: journalist, professor of journalism

Carl Paul Janensch Jr. (November 26, 1938 – July 15, 2025) was an American executive editor of The Courier-Journal, based in Louisville, Kentucky. He was also co-author of a play that has had several stagings. From 2009 onwards, Janensch was a professor emeritus of journalism at Quinnipiac University, Hamden, Connecticut, where he had begun teaching in 1995 and led the effort to create the graduate journalism program. He wrote and delivered weekly commentaries and essays on media and other issues for commercial and public radio. He was the onetime president of the Associated Press Managing Editors (1989), a board member of the American Society of News Editors, and a Pulitzer Prize juror.

== Newspaper journalism career ==
Janensch started as a cub police reporter for the City News Bureau of Chicago, a cooperative news-gathering agency; he subsequently wrote radio newscasts for United Press International. Upon graduation from Columbia University Graduate School of Journalism, Janensch landed his first real newspaper job working for Publisher Barry Bingham Sr. and Executive Editor Norman Isaacs at The Courier-Journal in Louisville. As a reporter, he covered civil rights including Martin Luther King's march to Selma, Alabama. He then served as Washington correspondent and city editor.

In 1964, Janensch was a recipient of the Sevellon Brown Awards in the history of American journalism from the Columbia University Graduate School of Journalism.

Janensch defended and strengthened The Courier-Journal's Ombudsman function after it became the first modern North American news organization to have one in 1967.

Janensch left the Louisville newspapers in 1975 to become managing editor of the Philadelphia Daily News. While there, he had the sad duty of identifying the body in the Philadelphia morgue of one of his staffers, John S. Knight III, killed in a brutal stabbing.

Janensch returned to the Louisville newspapers in 1976 to become managing editor of The Louisville Times, a now-defunct afternoon daily. He subsequently became managing editor of The Courier-Journal and then executive editor of The Courier-Journal and Louisville Times. When he held that position, two Louisville staffers won a Pulitzer Prize for their coverage of refugee camps in Southeast Asia. He helped arrange for the Louisville newspapers to host the 50th anniversary convention of the Associated Press Managing Editors and two years later an annual meeting of the fledgling National Association of Black Journalists (NABJ). He filled in for Barry Bingham Jr. as editor and publisher for nine months while Bingham took a sabbatical leave.

When Gannett purchased the Louisville newspapers in 1987, Gannett transferred Janensch to its headquarters staff. While there, he established an advanced training program for the Gannett Foundation (now The Freedom Forum) to help Washington-based reporters from regional newspapers develop stories for the papers that employed them. He then was sent to Gannett Suburban Newspapers in White Plains, New York, and served as a vice president and editor and general manager of The Journal News of Rockland (New York). In 1992, he left Gannett to become top editor of the Worcester (Massachusetts) Telegram and Gazette, then owned by the San Francisco Chronicle. At all three newspaper companies, he was known for recruiting and promoting women and minority news professionals.

After leaving Worcester, Janensch became a consultant to Russian newspapers in 1994-95 under a USAID grant program administered by New York University. Janensch advised on steps to transform former government-owned and subsidized newspapers into profitable businesses and also on the importance of editors forming associations to share best practices and defend against pressures from outside forces.

== Radio journalism career ==
Beginning in 1997, Janensch expanded his work to radio broadcasting. His weekly media commentaries were broadcast by WQUN AM 1220, Quinnipiac University's commercial radio station, serving Hamden, New Haven and other Connecticut communities. One 2010 commentary took a more light-hearted approach than his normally serious analyses when he focused on a professional Barbie doll released just before Christmas called "News Anchor Barbie." For 10 years, his commentaries on the news media were aired by the five stations of WNPR Connecticut Public Radio.

Janensch's commentaries for WNPR and the newspapers often were picked up by other platforms, including the Poynter Institute's James Romenesko and the journalism.org site of the Project for Excellence in Journalism.

In 2010 Janensch's weekly "Treasure Coast Essays" began on NPR-affiliated station WQCS, serving Florida communities of Vero Beach and Fort Pierce. He was also heard occasionally on Albany, NY public radio FM station WMAC's ongoing feature called "The Academic Minute." His occasional guest commentaries were aired by WSHU-FM in Fairfield, Connecticut.

== Playwright ==
Janensch co-wrote Dear Eva, a nonfiction play based on World War II letters saved by Eva Lee Brown of Easley, South Carolina, and discovered 50 years later by her daughter, Catherine Ladnier of Greenwich, Connecticut, who invited Janensch to be her collaborator. Love in a Time of War, a spinoff consisting of the love letters in Dear Eva, was staged by the Shawnee Playhouse in Pennsylvania and the University of Memphis.

Janensch wrote the script of Famine Echoes, a dramatic reading of what ordinary men and women told their descendants about Ireland's Great Hunger; the material was used by permission of Cathal Póirtéir, author of the 1995 book Famine Echoes, and the National Folklore Collection, University College Dublin. In March 2014 the dramatic reading was directed by Janensch in performance at Ireland's Great Hunger Museum in Hamden, Connecticut.

== Education career ==
In the late 1980s, while still with Gannett, Janensch taught newspaper management as an adjunct professor at Columbia University Graduate School of Journalism. As editor of the Rockland Journal-News, in 1990 he was a founder of Leadership Rockland, which offers existing and emerging leaders an educational experience focused on the infrastructure of Rockland County, New York.

In 1995, Janensch became associate professor of journalism at Quinnipiac University (then Quinnipiac College) and later was granted tenure. He taught both graduate and undergraduate students during his 14 years there.

Under Quinnipiac auspices, Janensch visited China to give lectures on the American news media at the Beijing Broadcasting Institute in 1997, 1998, and 2000. He also hosted visiting professors from China in an exchange between this institute and Quinnipiac. He moderated and served on panels on ethics, political polls, and other matters at annual conferences of the Association for Education in Journalism and Mass Communication (AEJMC). He taught a course on the autobiographical writings of Frank McCourt and Malachy McCourt to Quinnipiac students studying in County Kerry, Ireland.

Janensch retired in June 2009 and was granted Professor Emeritus status. In April 2013 he was appointed a writing adjunct at Ireland's Great Hunger Museum (Musaem An Ghorta Mhoir) at Quinnipiac University. He continued to teach a seminar on news media systems around the world as an adjunct.

== Personal life and death ==
Born November 26, 1938, Carl Paul Janensch Jr., in Evanston, Illinois, Janensch was a graduate of Georgetown University (B.A., 1960) and Columbia University Graduate School of Journalism (M.S.J., 1964). He married Courier-Journal reporter Gail Evans in 1969. They had three adult children and two grandsons. They divided their time between homes in Connecticut and Florida. Janensch was related to German paleontologist and geologist Werner Janensch (1878–1969).

Janensch died on July 15, 2025, at the age 86.
