= New Haven Independent =

Weekly newspaper serving community in Connecticut, US

- Type: Weekly newspaper
- Founded: 1986
- Ceased publication: 1990
- Language: English
- City: New Haven, Connecticut
- Country: United States

The New Haven Independent was a weekly newspaper published in New Haven, Connecticut, from 1986 to 1990. Emphasizing local investigative reporting, neighborhood-based journalism and cultural affairs, the Independent attracted national attention for innovative civic journalism, presaging the growth of hyperlocal and nonprofit news in the years that followed. In 1988 Columbia Journalism Review credited the Independent with bucking national trends: "Conventional wisdom would hold that to launch a new weekly newspaper in a place like this, the editors would have to aim squarely at the suburbs and the gentrifying sections of town in order to survive. But the New Haven Independent…has included the city's ethnic and less than upscale neighborhoods and survived. It has gathered up journalism awards in the bargain and held the feet of the city's daily…to the fire."

The New Haven Independent is also the name of a separate digital news site founded in 2005, 15 years after the print newspaper ceased publication. This not-for-profit online journalism project reports on local news and issues within New Haven, Connecticut. The content they cover are politics, business, culture and arts. They also have sections to choose from that tackle modern day issues such as Black Lives Matter, immigration and LGBTQ. The New Haven Independent also have a community radio on station 103.5 called WNHH radio. The website includes government and community links that keep local citizens updated and informed as well as an events calendar. They are partnered with La Voz Branford Eagle and Valley Independent Sentinel. These link can be found on the main page of New Haven Independent. The site also includes ted talks, sponsors such as The Community Foundation for Greater New Haven and Yale New Haven Health. Information is updated daily. The New Haven Independent depends on contributions, and also relies on grants that support specific areas of reporting and sponsorship grants. They also have a Twitter page that is called @newhavenindy where they post News updates and a Facebook page.

== History ==
The New Haven Independent began publication on September 11, 1986. Its founders included publisher Cynthia Savo, a New Haven native and community activist; and editors Carole Bass, Bruce Shapiro and Paul Bass all of whom had reported for local daily newspapers and alternative weeklies. At the time New Haven, home to Yale University, was the seventh poorest city in the United States, and was in the midst of turmoil over development and political shifts. The paper was supported by local business leaders keen for an alternative to the conservative daily New Haven Register, which after a century of local family ownership had been sold to the Ingersoll chain and was disinvesting in city news.

The Independent's editorial philosophy distinguished the paper both from beat-driven traditional dailies and from alternative weeklies aimed primarily at baby boomers and entertainment consumers. "We hope the New Haven Independent will find readers in every neighborhood, in every social and economic class, in every age group," declared the paper's editorial page in the inaugural issue. The Independent combined intimate coverage of previously-neglected New Haven neighborhoods with in-depth investigations on local politicians, developers, schools and other issues and institutions. One exposé of payoffs sparked a national investigation of the U.S. Department of Housing and Urban Development. The Independent also featured extensive arts writing, covering a city regarded as Connecticut's cultural capital and a major center of American theater, including extended profiles and features on internationally notable artists including Lynn Nottage, Dario Fo and Franca Rame, Brian Friel, Lee Breuer, August Wilson, Lloyd Richards, and others, and first proposed that New Haven host an international arts festival, eventually established as the International Festival of Arts and Ideas. At its peak the paper's subscribers included half the households in New Haven, a city of 126,000.

The paper's coverage spanned tumultuous years in New Haven and Connecticut politics, including the final years of the administration of Mayor Ben DiLieto, a controversial former police chief, and the 1989 election of John Daniels as the city's first African-American mayor.

The New Haven Independent was also the victor in Dow v. New Haven Independent, a libel case credited with expanding freedom of the press in Connecticut. In March 1987, the Independent published an unsigned three-paragraph editorial harshly criticizing Superintendent of Schools John Dow for refusing to allow children with AIDS to attend public schools, and for resisting open records requests from news media. Dow, believing the editorial to be racially motivated, sued for libel. Connecticut Superior Court Judge Robert Berdon dismissed the suit on grounds that "the state constitution not only protects opinion to the same extent as the federal constitution, but goes further." Berdon found that under the Connecticut constitution, clearly marked editorials and opinions on the conduct of public officials "are entitled to an absolute, unconditional privilege." Arguing that meritless lawsuits were a threat to news organizations, Berdon wrote that "Connecticut should take additional steps to protect the public's right to a free press." This ruling went further than any previous state court decision and was regarded as a significant precedent on so-called Strategic Lawsuits Against Public Participation (SLAPP suits).

== Closing and legacy ==
In the fall of 1989, following a series of editorial and fiscal disputes with the founders, the paper's financial backers installed new business leadership. The Independent ceased publication shortly after the newly hired managing director, Bernard Zelitch, was arrested in the paper's office, charged with assaulting associate editor and theater columnist Margaret Spillane, leading to the mass resignation of the Independent's remaining editorial staff.

Before ceasing publication in January 1990, the Independent was briefly edited by Bridgeport, CT journalist Leonard Grimaldi, who in 2003 pled guilty to racketeering charges and was sentenced to 14 months in federal prison in a municipal government corruption scandal.

Notable alumni of the paper include Professor Elizabeth Coonrod Martinez of DePaul University, a noted Latino Studies scholar; Cynthia Savo of the Yale Child Study Center; Margaret Spillane, writer for The Nation and Salon.com and instructor in Cultural Journalism at Yale University; New Haven political press secretary Khalid Lum; investigative journalist and 2008 Alicia Patterson Fellow Carole Bass; Professor Joel Schechter of San Francisco State University and author, Messiahs of 1933: How Yiddish Theatre Survived Adversity through Satire; Bruce Shapiro, Executive Director of the Dart Center for Journalism and Trauma at Columbia Journalism School and a contributing editor to The Nation; Virginia Blaisdell, photographer and designer; Hartford Courant theater critic Christopher Arnott; and Joel Keehn, senior healthcare editor of Consumer Reports.
