= Global Center for Journalism and Trauma =

The Global Center for Journalism and Trauma (GCJT) is a U.S.-based nonprofit organization devoted to advancing informed and ethical news coverage of violence, conflict and tragedy, and advocating for the mental health of journalists around the world confronting trauma, threat and other occupational risks. Through training programs, workshops, fellowships and research GCJT connects news organizations and news professionals with trauma clinicians, researchers and other experts, GCJT defines best practices in reporting on survivors of violence and abuse, and is widely known both within the U.S. and internationally for pioneering programs addressing the psychological impact of trauma exposure, threat and abuse on news professionals.

The Global Center continues work previously conducted by the Dart Center for Journalism and Trauma, which was founded in 1999 and had been a project of the Columbia Journalism School but was sunset by Columbia amid the university's confrontation with the Trump administration in 2025. GCJT was established that year as an independent nonprofit continuing with the same leadership team, programs and mission. GCJT continues to collaborate closely with the Committee to Protect Journalists.

GCJT's flagship programs include the Ochberg Fellowship, an annual seminar for journalists around the world whose alumni include numerous noted reporters including winners of the Pulitzer Prize, Emmy Awards and other honors. The fellowship is named for psychiatrist Frank Ochberg M.D., a key figure in the development of PTSD diagnosis and treatment.

The Global Center for Journalism and Trauma's director is Bruce Shapiro, a journalist, university educator, press freedom advocate and author. Shapiro, a contributing editor at The Nation magazine and US Correspondent for the Australian public radio program Late Night Live, was the longtime director of the Dart Center for Journalism and Trauma at Columbia University and taught journalism ethics at Columbia for over a decade. He is recipient of the International Society for Traumatic Stress Studies Public Advocacy Award for "outstanding and fundamental contributions to advancing the social understanding of trauma. GCJT's research director as of 2022 is Elana Newman of the University of Tulsa.

== Journalist Trauma Support Network ==
In 2021, the Journalist Trauma Support Network was created by the Dart Center in collaboration with The Committee to Protect Journalists. It provides training for trauma psychotherapists seeking to provide specialized evidence-based treatment responsive to the unique needs of working journalists. It is now a program of GCJT. Within the United States, GCJT's newsroom training and psychosocial support programs for journalists were recognized in 2025 with a $1.25 million grant by Press Forward for support of local and nonprofit newsrooms.

== See also ==
- International Women's Media Foundation
- Safety of journalists
