= LynNell Hancock =

LynNell Hancock is an American education reporter and professor. She graduated from the University of Iowa and the Columbia University Graduate School of Journalism, where she is now a professor.

After graduating from Columbia, Hancock worked as a reporter with the New York Daily News and The Village Voice, mainly covering education and children's issues. A former education editor of Newsweek, Hancock is active in several education and children's organizations.

At Columbia, Hancock teaches education and children's reporting. She is the author of "Hands to Work," a book about the lives of three welfare recipients in New York City.
