= Counting method =

Psychotherapeutic treatment

The counting method (CM), also known as Ochberg's counting method, is a therapeutic treatment designed to help with the desensitization of post traumatic stress disorder (PTSD) symptoms. The method was designed by psychiatrist Frank Ochberg in the early 1990s. Ochberg, who'd previously helped to define and characterize post traumatic stress disorder, began using the CM in his private practice as a means of combating PTSD symptoms.

== The method ==
During the CM, the clinician asks the PTSD client to recall a traumatic memory while the clinician counts out loud to 100. After the counting the client is asked to discuss their memory. Subsequently, clinician and client work to reframe that traumatic memory and minimize or eliminate the discomfort associated with it.

== Results ==
A recent study sought to compare the CM to other existing forms of PTSD treatment. The study divided 38 women among three forms of PTSD therapy, including the CM. All three treatments worked very well in minimizing PTSD symptoms; additionally, the study showed that the CM may be as effective as other pre-established techniques in the treatment of PTSD.

== See also ==
- Progressive counting (PC)
