= Ricky Greenwald =

Ricky Greenwald is a clinical psychologist. An expert on eye movement desensitization and reprocessing (EMDR), he is also the creator of progressive counting (PC), both are psychotherapy methods for resolving traumatic memories and associated symptoms. He founded the Trauma Institute & Child Trauma Institute, a non-profit organization, and is currently its executive director and chair of the faculty.

== Education ==
Greenwald holds a B.S. in Psychology from Lesley College (1988) and an M.A. degree in Psychology from Forest Institute of Professional Psychology (1989). After completing a two-year certificate in Family Therapy at the Kantor Family Institute (1991), Greenwald returned to the Forest Institute and earned his Psy.D. in Clinical Psychology (1994) followed by a post-doc in Child and Adolescent Trauma from Community Services Institute (1996).

== Professional contributions ==
=== Assessment ===
Greenwald has developed various assessment instruments for children's post-traumatic symptoms, including the Child Report of Post-traumatic Symptoms (CROPS) and Parent Report of [the child's] Posttraumatic Symptoms (PROPS), Lifetime Incidence of Traumatic Events for students or parents (LITE-S and LITE-P), and Problem Rating Scale. These have been widely translated, and the CROPS & PROPS are available in about 20 languages.

=== Treatment ===
Greenwald was a pioneer in developing EMDR’s use with children and adolescents. He developed the Fairy Tale Model of trauma-informed treatment as well as progressive counting (PC), a trauma therapy based on the counting method. In recent years, he has been pioneering intensive trauma-focused therapy in the format of full consecutive days.

=== Training ===
Greenwald developed the full-package model of EMDR training, to include all parts of the training as well as follow-up consultation; this training approach has been widely adopted internationally. He also developed PC training, along with a trainer training system and a PC certification. Greenwald offers a six-day small-group Trauma Trainers Retreat every year, to mentor aspiring trauma experts.

=== Trauma Institute & Child Trauma Institute ===
In 2002, Greenwald founded the Child Trauma Institute (later renamed the Trauma Institute & Child Trauma Institute), a nonprofit organization in Northampton, MA, USA. Initially solely a training institute, it is now also active in research on treatment and training and in providing intensive trauma-focused therapy.

Greenwald is an affiliate professor at the University at Buffalo School of Social Work, served on the board of directors for the EMDR International Association, and is a fellow of the American Psychological Association, Division 56.

== Publications ==
=== Books ===
- Greenwald, R. (1993). Using EMDR with children. Pacific Grove, CA: EMDR Institute. [Spanish translation, 1999].
- Greenwald, R. (1999). Eye movement desensitization and reprocessing (EMDR) in child and adolescent psychotherapy. Northvale, NJ: Jason Aronson. [Italian translation, 2000; German translation, 2001.]
- Greenwald, R. (Ed.).(2002). Trauma and juvenile delinquency: Theory, research and interventions. NY: Haworth.
- Greenwald, R. (2005). Child trauma handbook: A guide for helping trauma-exposed children and adolescents. NY: Haworth. [Korean translation 2011.]
- Greenwald, R. (2007). EMDR within a phase model of trauma-informed treatment. NY: Haworth.
- Greenwald, R., & Baden, K. J. (2007). A fairy tale. [comic book] Greenfield, MA: Child Trauma Institute. [Dutch translation, 2014.]
- Greenwald, R. (2009). Treating problem behaviors. NY: Routledge; [Dutch translation, 2013.] 8) Greenwald, R., & Rettun, J.
- Greenwald, R. & J. Rettun (2012). The child abuser’s secret book of tricks. [comic book.] Greenfield, MA: Trauma Institute & Child Trauma Institute. [German translation, 2014]
- Greenwald, R. (2013). Progressive counting within a phase model of trauma-informed treatment. NY: Routledge.
- Greenwald, R. (2016). Slaying the dragon: Overcoming life’s challenges and achieving your goals. Northampton, MA: Trauma Institute.

=== Selected articles ===
- Greenwald, R. (1994). Applying eye movement desensitization and reprocessing (EMDR) to the treatment of traumatized children: Five case studies. Anxiety Disorders Practice Journal, 1, 83-97.
- Greenwald, R. (1996). The information gap in the EMDR controversy. Professional Psychology: Research and Practice, 27, 67-72.
- Greenwald, R., & Rubin, A. (1999). Brief assessment of children’s post-traumatic symptoms: Development and preliminary validation of parent and child scales. Research on Social Work Practice, 9, 61-75.
- Soberman, G. S., Greenwald, R., & Rule, D. L. (2002). A controlled study of eye movement desensitization and reprocessing (EMDR) for boys with conduct problems. Journal of Aggression, Maltreatment, and Trauma, 6, 217-236.
- Jaberghaderi, N., Greenwald, R., Rubin, A., Zand, S. O., &Dolatabadi S. (2004). A comparison of CBT and EMDR for sexually abused Iranian girls. Clinical Psychology and Psychotherapy, 11, 358-368.
- Greenwald, R. (2006). The peanut butter and jelly problem: In search of a better EMDR training model. EMDR Practitioner.
- Greenwald, R., Maguin, E., Smyth, N. J., Greenwald, H., Johnston, K. G., & Weiss, R. (2008). Trauma-related insight improves attitudes and behaviors toward challenging clients. Traumatology, 14(2), 1-11.
- Greenwald, R.,& Schmitt, T. A. (2010). Progressive Counting: Multi-site group and individual treatment open trials. Psychological Trauma: Theory, Research, Practice, and Policy, 2, 239-242.
- Becker, J., Greenwald, R.,& Mitchell, C. (2011). Trauma-informed treatment for disenfranchised urban children and youth: An open trial. Child & Adolescent Social Work Journal, 28, 257-272.
- de Roos, C., Greenwald, R., den Hollander-Gijsman, M., Noorthoorn, E., van Buuren, S., & de Jongh, A. (2011). A randomized comparison of CBT and EMDR for disaster-exposed children. European Journal of Psychotraumatology, 2, 5694.
- Greenwald, R., Siradas, L., Schmitt, T. A., Reslan, S., Sande, B., &Fierle, J. (2012). Implementing trauma-informed treatment for youth in a residential facility: First-year outcomes. Residential Treatment for Children & Youth, 29, 1-13.
- Greenwald, R., McClintock, S. D., & Bailey, T. D. (2013). A controlled comparison of eye movement desensitization & reprocessing and progressive counting. Journal of Aggression, Maltreatment, & Trauma, 22, 981-996.
- Greenwald, R. (2014). Intensive child therapy to prevent further abuse victimization: A case study. Journal of Child Custody, 11, 325-334.
- Greenwald, R., McClintock, S. D., Jarecki, K., & Monaco, A. (2015). A comparison of eye movement desensitization & reprocessing and progressive counting among therapists in training. Traumatology, 21, 1-6.
