= Thomas B. Edsall =

American journalist and academic

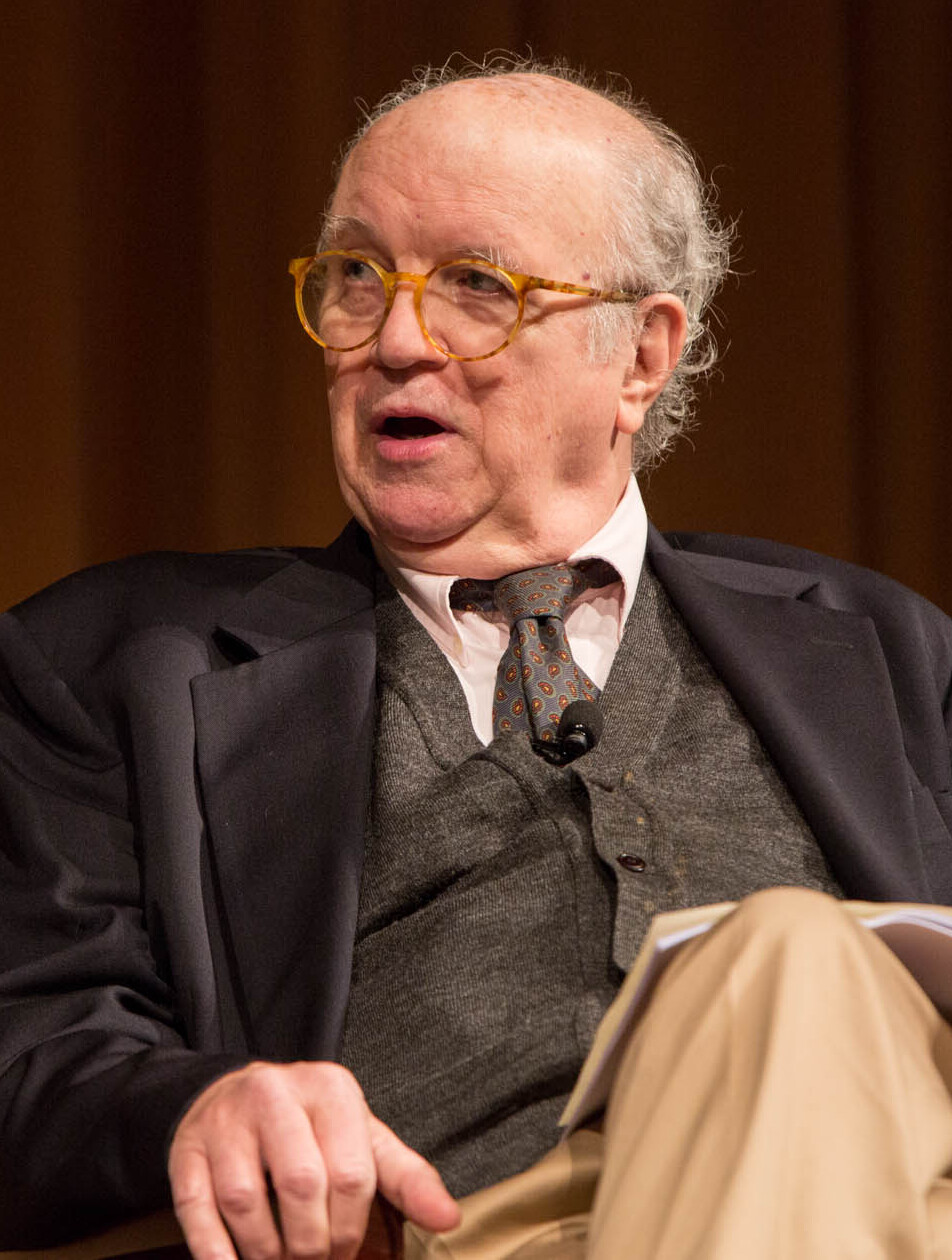
- Edsall in 2016
- Born: Thomas Byrne Edsall; August 22, 1941 (age 85); Cambridge, Massachusetts, U.S.
- Education: Brown University; Boston University (BA)
- Occupations: Journalist, author, professor
- Known for: Weekly column in The New York Times (2011 to present)
- Spouse: Mary D. Edsall (m. 1965, d. 2025)
- Children: 1
- Awards: Finalist, Pulitzer Prize for General Nonfiction (1992)

Thomas Byrne Edsall (born August 22, 1941) is an American journalist and academic. Since 2006, he has written a weekly opinion column for The New York Times. Previously, he worked as a reporter for The Providence Journal and for The Baltimore Sun, and as a correspondent for The New Republic. In addition, he spent 25 years covering national politics for the Washington Post. He held the Joseph Pulitzer II and Edith Pulitzer Moore Chair at the Columbia University Graduate School of Journalism until 2014.

== Early life and education ==
Edsall was born in Cambridge, Massachusetts, the son of Richard Linn Edsall, a market research executive, and Katherine Byrne, a museum executive. Edsall is the grandson of David Linn Edsall, who served as Dean of the Harvard Medical School from 1918 to 1935. He is the nephew of John Tileston Edsall, a noted protein scientist and professor at Harvard University and Geoffrey Edsall, the former president of the American Association of Immunologists.

He attended Brown University, before receiving his B.A. from Boston University in 1966.

== Career ==
Edsall worked as a reporter for The Providence Journal in 1965 and served as a VISTA volunteer in Baltimore from 1966 to 1967. Edsall covered politics for The Baltimore Sun from 1967 to 1981; and he covered national politics for the Washington Post from 1981 to 2006. He was the political editor of the Huffington Post from 2007 to 2009, a correspondent for The New Republic from 2006 to 2013, and for the National Journal from 2006 to 2007.

In November and December 2006, Edsall was a guest columnist for the print edition of the New York Times Op-Ed page.

From 2006 to 2014, Edsall served as the Joseph Pulitzer II and Edith Pulitzer Moore Professor of Public Affairs Journalism at the Columbia University Graduate School of Journalism, where he continued, as of 2021, to teach in an adjunct capacity.

From 2011 to at least December 2025, Edsall was a contributor to the Opinion section of the New York Times.

His "frequent" TV and radio appearances include the venues of CNN, CSPAN, MSNBC, PBS, FOX, and NPR.

== Personal life ==
Edsall is married and lives in New York and Washington, D.C., with his wife, Mary (daughter of Karl Deutsch), with whom he co-authored the book Chain Reaction, a 1992 Pulitzer Prize finalist in general nonfiction.

The couple has one daughter, Alexandra, a graduate of Harvard Law School and former law clerk for Supreme Court Justice Ruth Bader Ginsberg.

== Awards and fellowships ==
- Shapiro Fellowship, School of Media and Public Affairs, George Washington University (2015)
- Markwell Award of the International Society of Political Psychology (2014)
- Finalist, General Nonfiction, Pulitzer Prize, 1992, for Chain Reaction: The Impact on American Politics of Race, Rights and Taxes (W.W. Norton)
- Bill Pryor Memorial Award, Washington-Baltimore Newspaper Guild, 1981
- Carey McWilliams Award, American Political Science Association, 1994
- Fellowship at the Woodrow Wilson International Center for Scholars 1996–1997.
- Media Fellow at the Hoover Institution, Stanford University, 1997, 2000, 2003–2006, 2010–2012.

== Works ==
External videos
- Booknotes interview with Edsall on Chain Reaction, December 15, 1991, C-SPAN
- Washington Journal interview with Edsall on The Age of Austerity, January 27, 2012, C-SPAN

- Edsall, Thomas B. (1984). The New Politics of Inequality. W. W. Norton. ISBN 0-393-30250-4.
- —— (1988). Power and Money: Writing About Politics. W. W. Norton.
- ——; Edsall, Mary D. (August 1992). Chain Reaction: The Impact of Race, Rights, and Taxes on American Politics. W. W. Norton. ISBN 0-393-30903-7.
- —— (August 28, 2006). Building Red America: The New Conservative Coalition and the Drive For Permanent Power. Basic Books. ISBN 0-465-01815-7.
- —— (January 10, 2012). The Age of Austerity: How Scarcity Will Remake American Politics. Doubleday. ISBN 978-0-385-53519-9.
- —— (April 11, 2023). The Point of No Return: American Democracy at the Crossroads. Princeton University Press. ISBN 978-0-691-16489-2.
