= Progressive counting =

Psychotherapy technique

Progressive counting (PC) is a psychotherapy technique developed by Ricky Greenwald designed for trauma resolution based on the counting method. It is used to reduce or eliminate symptoms such as anxiety, depression, guilt, anger, and post-traumatic reactions. It can also be used to enhance psychological resources such as confidence and self-esteem. The procedure involves having the client visualize a series of progressively longer "movies" of the trauma memory while the therapist counts out loud (first to a count of 10, then 20, then 30, etc.). By repeatedly imagining the movie of the memory, the memory gets "digested" or healed, via desensitization, emotional processing, gaining perspective, or other means.

== Approach ==
Prior to the session, the therapist actively guides the client in identifying the beginning moment of the chosen movie (before the trauma event happened) and the ending moment (a point after the trauma event which provided relief). The client is asked to watch, in imagination, a movie of the trauma memory from beginning to end, while the therapist counts aloud from one to 10; then the next time to 20; then to 30, and so on, to a maximum of 100. Later when the memory is nearly resolved and there is less work to do, the length of the counting for the movies is progressively decreased. The client can choose to discuss the memory but is not required to; thus the client can maintain privacy regarding memory details. The therapist then asks the client to rate their level of distress on a scale of 0-10 (according to the subjective units of distress scale or SUDS). The therapist's goal is to bring the SUDS rating of the traumatic memory to a score of 0 (no distress), and can adjust the exposure level as needed by increasing or decreasing the numbers counted during their movie.

== Modifications to counting method ==
PC is a modified version of the counting method (CM), but with the following modifications:

1. Multiple dual-focus exposures (visualizing the movie during therapist counting) within a single session.
2. Starting with a movie-duration count of 10 and increasing by a count of 10 each time (to 20, then 30, etc.) up to the maximum count of 100. This is to further control the dose and allow for progressively greater exposure as the client makes progress on mastering the memory. Later, when the client has nearly completed trauma processing, the count becomes progressively shorter as there is less work to do.
3. Minimizing the review phase, so that the client is only asked to briefly comment on the experience, but not to recount the details of the movie (unless the client takes the initiative to do so).
4. The imaginal exposure movie goes all the way to the full-relief ending, even if that requires going far beyond the immediate conclusion of the most traumatic part of the memory (in CM the movie ends shortly after the most traumatic component is over).
5. Continuing until Subjective Units of Distress Scale (SUDS) is zero and there is no further change (in CM the work can stop when SUDS is two or lower).

== Versus EMDR ==
Two studies have been completed comparing PC to eye movement desensitization and reprocessing (EMDR). A pilot study compared EMDR and PC for volunteers from the community who reported having a disturbing memory; some met criteria for PTSD and some did not. Ten experienced EMDR-trained therapists were briefly trained in PC, and participants were randomized to treatment condition. No significant differences between EMDR and PC were found. The treatments were rated by participants as equally difficult. EMDR had a trend of fewer dropouts whereas PC had a trend of greater efficiency. In the other comparison study, 109 therapists in either EMDR or PC training programs worked on several of their own upsetting memories in practicums during the course of the training. For each treated memory they recorded treatment time as well as pre/post memory-related distress ratings; ratings were repeated at 2 and 10 weeks post-treatment via e-mail. Participants also rated the perceived difficulty of the treatment they experienced. Participants in both conditions reported significant reductions in memory-related distress, which persisted at 2 weeks and 10 weeks post-treatment. There were no differences in effect size or maintenance of gains. PC was 37.5% more efficient than EMDR, and was rated by those in the client role as being less difficult.
