= Joan Konner =

American academic and journalist

Joan Konner (born Joan Barbara Weiner; February 24, 1931 – April 18, 2018), was an American academic and journalist who served as Dean of the Columbia School of Journalism.

Born in Paterson, New Jersey, Konner received her B.A. from Sarah Lawrence College and an M.S. from Columbia University before becoming a journalist with the Bergen Record. She produced over 50 documentaries and television series, including the PBS series The Power of Myth, and She Says/Women in News, which won a 2002 Emmy Award. In September 1988, she became the first female Dean of the Columbia School of Journalism, a position she held for eight years. In 1991, while she was dean, the school organized the first public appearance of Salman Rushdie outside of England after the Satanic Verses controversy.

From 1988 to 1999 she was also the publisher of the Columbia Journalism Review.
