= Symptoms of victimization =

Victimization refers to a person being made into a victim by someone else and can take on psychological as well as physical forms, both of which are damaging to victims. Forms of victimization include (but are not limited to) bullying or peer victimization, physical abuse, sexual abuse, verbal abuse, robbery, and assault. Some of these forms of victimization are commonly associated with certain populations, but they can happen to others as well. For example, bullying or peer victimization is most commonly studied in children and adolescents but also takes place between adults. Although anyone may be victimized, particular groups (e.g. children, the elderly, individuals with disabilities) may be more susceptible to certain types of victimization and as a result to the symptoms and consequences that follow. Individuals respond to victimization in a wide variety of ways, so noticeable symptoms of victimization will vary from person to person. These symptoms may take on several different forms (e.g. psychological, behavioral, or physical), be associated with specific forms of victimization, and be moderated by individual characteristics of the victim and/or experiences after victimization.

== Categories of outcomes ==
Symptoms of victimization may include negative physical, psychological, or behavioral consequences that are direct or indirect responses (see physical symptoms section) to victimization experiences. Symptoms in these categories sometimes overlap, are closely related, or cause each other. For example, a behavioral symptom such as an increase in aggressiveness or irritability may be part of a particular psychological outcome such as Post-traumatic stress disorder. Much of the research on symptoms of victimization is cross-sectional (researchers only collected data at one point in time). From a research perspective this means that the symptoms are associated with victimization, but the causal relationship is not always established and alternative explanations have not been ruled out. Some of the symptoms described also may put individuals at risk for victimization. For example, there may be a two-way relationship between victimization and certain internalizing symptoms such as depression or withdrawal, such that victimization increases these symptoms, and individuals exhibiting these symptoms may be targeted for victimization more often than others.

=== Psychological ===
The experience of being victimized may cause an individual to feel vulnerable or helpless, as well as changing their view of the world and/or their self-perception; the psychological distress this causes may manifest in a number of ways. Diagnosable psychological disorders that are associated with victimization experiences include depression, anxiety, and post-traumatic stress disorder (PTSD). Psychological symptoms that are disruptive to a person's life may be present in some form even if they do not meet diagnostic criteria for a specific disorder. A variety of symptoms such as withdrawal, avoidance, and nightmares, may be part of one of these diagnosable disorders or may occur in milder or more isolated form; diagnoses of particular disorders require that these symptoms have a particular degree of severity or frequency, or that an individual exhibits a certain number of them in order to be formally diagnosed.

==== Depression ====
Depression has been found to be associated with many forms of victimization, including sexual victimization, violent crime, property crime, peer victimization, and domestic abuse. Indicators of depression include irritable or sad mood for prolonged periods of time, lack of interest in most activities, significant changes in weight/appetite, activity, and sleep patterns, loss of energy and concentration, excessive feelings of guilt or worthlessness, and suicidality. The loss of energy, interest, and concentration associated with depression may impact individuals who have experienced victimization academically or professionally. Depression can impact many other areas of a person's life as well, including interpersonal relationships and physical health. Depression in response to victimization may be lethal, as it can result in suicidal ideation and suicide attempts. Examples of this include a ten-fold increase found in suicide attempts among rape victims compared to the general population, and significant correlations between being victimized in school and suicidal ideation.

==== Anxiety ====
A connection between victimization and anxiety has been established for both children and adults. The particular types of anxiety studied in relation to victimization vary; some research references anxiety as a general term while other research references more specific types such as social anxiety. The term anxiety covers a range of difficulties and several specific diagnoses, including panic attacks, phobias, and generalized anxiety disorder. Panic attacks are relatively short, intense bursts of fear that may or may not have a trigger (a cause in the immediate environment that happens right before they occur). They are sometimes a part of other anxiety disorders. Phobias may be specific to objects, situations, people, or places. They can result in avoidance behaviors or, if avoidance is not possible, extreme anxiety or panic attacks. Generalized anxiety is characterized by long-term, uncontrolled, intense worrying in addition to other symptoms such as irritability, sleep problems, or restlessness. Anxiety has been shown to disrupt many aspects of people's lives as well, for example, academic functioning, and to predict worse health outcomes later in life.

==== Post-traumatic stress disorder ====
Post-traumatic stress disorder (PTSD) is a specific anxiety disorder in response to a traumatic event in a person's life. It is often discussed in the context of mental health of combat veterans, but also occurs in individuals who have been traumatized in other ways, such as victimization. PTSD involves long-term intense fear, re-experiencing the traumatic event (e.g. nightmares), avoidance of reminders of the event, and being highly reactive (e.g. easily enraged or startled). It may include feeling detached from other people, self-guilt, and difficulty sleeping. Individuals with PTSD may experience a number of symptoms similar to those experienced in both anxiety and depression.

In addition to the established diagnostic criteria for PTSD, Frank Ochberg proposed a specific set of victimization symptoms (not formally recognized in diagnostic systems such as the DSM or ICD) that includes shame, self-blame, obsessive hatred of the person who victimized them alongside conflicting positive feelings toward that person, feeling defiled, being sexually inhibited, despair or resignation to the situation, secondary victimization (described below), and risk of revictimization.

=== Other ===
Additional symptoms of victimization may take on physical or behavioral forms. These may be direct, individual symptoms of victimization, or they may result from the psychological outcomes described above.

==== Physical ====
The most direct and obvious physical symptoms of victimization are injuries as a result of an aggressive physical action such as assault or sexual victimization. Other physical symptoms that are not a result of injury may be indirectly caused by victimization through psychological or emotional responses. Physical symptoms with a psychological or emotional basis are called psychosomatic symptoms. Common psychosomatic symptoms associated with victimization include headaches, stomachaches and experiencing a higher frequency of illnesses such as colds and sore throats. Though psychosomatic symptoms are referred to as having psychological causes they have a biological basis as well; stress and other psychological symptoms trigger nervous system responses such as the release of various chemicals and hormones which then affect biological functioning.

==== Behavioral ====
Individuals who have been victimized may also exhibit behavioral symptoms after the experience. Some individuals who have been victimized show externalizing (outwardly directed) behaviors. For example, an individual who has not previously acted aggressively toward others may begin to do so as after being victimized, such as when a child who has been bullied begins to bully others. Aggressive behaviors may be associated with PTSD (described above). Externalizing behaviors associated with victimization include hyperactivity, hypervigilance, and attention problems that may resemble ADHD. Others may exhibit internalizing (inwardly directed) behavioral symptoms. Many internalizing symptoms tend to be more psychological in nature (depression and anxiety are sometimes referred to as internalization), but particular behaviors are indicative of internalization as well. Internalizing behaviors that have been documented in victimized individuals include withdrawing from social contact and avoidance of people or situations.

==== Substance use ====
Drug and alcohol use associated with victimization is sometimes explained as a form of self-medication, or an attempt to alleviate other symptoms resulting from victimization through substance use. Supporting this, alcohol use has been empirically connected to particular symptoms of post-traumatic stress disorder. Sexual abuse in particular has been identified as one significant precursor to serious alcohol use among women, although it is not as well-established as a causal link and may be mediated by PTSD or other psychological symptoms. Connections have been established between victimization and the use of other drugs as well. Drug use in adolescence and peer victimization based on sexual orientation are correlated. Research has drawn connections between substance use and childhood physical abuse in the general population. Drug use has also been connected to both physical and sexual victimization among high risk, incarcerated youth.

== Types ==
Specific types of victimization have been strongly linked to particular symptoms or outcomes. These symptoms are not exclusively associated with these forms of victimization but have been studied in association with them, possibly because of their relevance to the specific victimization experiences.

=== Sexual ===
Some individuals who have experienced victimization may have difficulty establishing and maintaining intimate relationships. This is not a subset of symptoms that is exclusive to sexual victimization, but the link between sexual victimization and intimacy problems has been particularly well-established in research. These difficulties may include sexual dysfunction, anxiety about sexual relationships, and dating aggression. Those who experience sexual victimization may have these difficulties long-term, as in the case of victimized children who continue to have difficulty with intimacy during adolescence and adulthood. Some research suggests that the severity of these intimacy problems is related directly to the severity of victimization, while other research suggests that self-blame and shame about sexual victimization mediates (causes) the relationship between victimization and outcomes.

=== Childhood bullying ===
One symptom that has been associated particularly with school-based peer victimization is poor academic functioning. This symptom is not exclusive to peer victimization, but is contextually relevant due to the setting in which such victimization takes place. Studies have shown poor academic functioning to be a result of peer victimization in elementary, middle, and high school in multiple countries. Though academic functioning has commonly been studied in relation to childhood bullying that takes place in schools, it is likely associated with other forms of victimization as well, as both depression and anxiety affect attention and focus.

=== Childhood physical abuse ===
Researchers have drawn connections between childhood physical abuse and tendencies toward violent or aggressive behaviors both during childhood and later in life. This aligns logically with increases in aggression and reactivity described above (see psychological symptoms section). The increased risk for engaging in aggressive behavior may be an indirect symptom, mediated by changes in the way that individuals process social information. Increased risk does not mean that everyone who was physically victimized during childhood will continue the cycle of violence with their own children or engage in aggressive behaviors to a point that it is highly detrimental or requires legal action; estimated numbers of individuals who do continue this pattern vary based on the type of aggressive behavior being studied. For example, 16-21% of abused and/or neglected children in one particular study were arrested for violent offenses by around the age of 30.

== Moderating factors ==
In psychology, a moderator is a factor that changes the outcome of a particular situation. With regards to victimization, these can take the form of environmental or contextual characteristics, other people's responses after victimization has occurred, or a victimized person's internal responses to or views on what they have experienced.

=== Attributions ===
Attributions about a situation or person refer to where an individual places the blame for an event. An individual may have a different response to being victimized and exhibit different symptoms if they interpret the victimization as being their own fault, the fault of the perpetrator of the victimization, or the fault of some other external factor. Attributions also vary by how stable or controllable someone believes a situation to be. Characterological self-blame for victimization (believing that something is one's own fault, that it is a stable characteristic about themselves, and that it is unchangeable or out of their control) has been shown to make victims feel particularly helpless and to have a negative effect on psychological outcomes. While self-blaming attributions have potentially harmful moderating effects on the symptoms of victimization for those who are already prone to self-blame, it is worth noting that self-blame may itself be a result of victimization for some individuals as noted above (see section on PTSD).

=== Coping and help-seeking ===
Victimized individuals who participate in active forms of coping experience fewer or less severe psychological symptoms after victimization. One form of active coping is seeking help from others. Help-seeking can be informal (e.g. seeking help from friends or family) or formal (e.g. police reporting of victimization). Attributions about victimization may play a role in whether an individual seeks help or from whom they seek it. For example, a recent study showed that children who are being victimized by peers are less likely to seek support from friends or teachers if they attribute victimization to a group factor such as race, and more likely to seek support if they attribute victimization to more individualized personal characteristics. Similarly, adult victims who blame themselves and are ashamed of being victimized may wish to hide the experience from others, and thus be less willing to seek help. Gender may affect willingness seek help as well; men who have been victimized may be less willing to disclose this information and ask for help due to differing societal expectations for men in addition to the shame and stigmatization experienced by both men and women in response to victimization.

The increased social support that sometimes results from seeking help may alleviate some of the symptoms of victimization and decrease the risk of continued or future victimization. However, seeking help may also make the outcomes and symptoms worse, depending on the context and responses to help-seeking behavior. Help-seeking may be received more positively from some individuals than others; for example, elementary school aged girls who seek social support after victimization may benefit from it socially, while victimized boys of the same age may experience worse social problems as a result of the same support-seeking behaviors. Seeking help may also increase the severity of victimization symptoms if an individual experiences secondary victimization in the form of victim-blaming, being forced to mentally relive a victimization experience, or other negative responses from individuals or institutions from whom they seek help. Secondary victimization has been documented in victims of rape when they seek medical or psychological assistance. It has also been documented in individuals whose victimization results in criminal trials, particularly if the outcomes of those trials were not in the victims' favor.

== See also ==
- Identification with the Aggressor
- Post-assault treatment of sexual assault victims
- Stockholm syndrome
- Traumatic bonding
- Victimology
