= Dart Center for Journalism and Trauma =

American resource center and think tank for journalists

The Dart Center for Journalism and Trauma was a resource center and think tank for journalists who cover violence, conflict and tragedy around the world. It operated from 1999 to 2009 at the University of Washington and was a project of the Columbia University Graduate School of Journalism in New York City from 2009 to 2025. The Dart Center was sunset by Columbia Journalism School in the summer of 2025. Its mission was adopted by the Global Center for Journalism and Trauma, an independent nonprofit unaffiliated with Columbia.

The Dart Center's mission was to improve the quality of journalism on traumatic events, while also raising awareness in newsrooms of the impact such coverage has on the journalists telling the stories. The Dart Center also operated Dart Centre Europe, based in London; Dart Centre Asia Pacific, based in Melbourne; and a research node at the University of Tulsa. The Dart Center established a temporary center through the summer of 2002 in New York City after the attacks of September 11, 2001 directed by Elana Newman and Barbra Monseu.

The Dart Center conducted seminars, training and support programs for journalists covering the attacks of September 11, 2001, Hurricane Katrina, the Boxing Day tsunami, the Troubles in Northern Ireland, the Iraq War and the Virginia Tech shootings, among other events. The Dart Center's longtime director was the American journalist Bruce Shapiro.

== History and programs ==
The Dart Center for Journalism and Trauma was founded at the University of Washington in 1999 to nurture innovation in ethical reporting on victims of violence and tragedy. Among its founders were Roger Simpson, a professor of communication at UW and the center's director until 2006; Shapiro, the center's executive director from 2006 to 2025; Frank Ochberg, a psychiatrist and authority on post traumatic stress disorder, and Elana Newman, a psychologist specializing in traumatic stress. It was named for its principal funder, the Dart Foundation. The Dart Center re-located to Columbia University in the spring of 2009.

Among the Dart Center's programs were the annual Dart Center Awards for Excellence in Reporting on Trauma (given annually since 1994) and the fellowship program, called after one of its founders Frank Ochberg which is aimed at mid career journalists who want to deepen their knowledge of emotional trauma and improve coverage of violence, conflict and tragedy, among whom six to ten journalists are selected every year to attend an intensive weeklong seminar program, including discussions with journalist colleagues, and the annual conference of the International Society for Traumatic Stress Studies. As of July 2025, more than 250 journalists had been selected for Dart Center Ochberg Fellowship.

The Dart Center also encouraged and led research on the psychological impact of reporting traumatic events on journalists, and encouraged the development of training and support programs at leading news organizations around the world. Its affiliate Dart Centre in Europe developed programs for the BBC and other news organizations. Dart Centre Asia Pacific worked actively with journalists in Australia, New Zealand, the Philippines, Cambodia and elsewhere in the region, and pioneering newsroom peer support programs.
