= Bruce Shapiro =

American journalist and author

Bruce Shapiro is an American journalist, commentator and author. He is executive director of the Global Center for Journalism and Trauma, a resource center and think tank for journalists who cover violence, conflict and tragedy. Shapiro was previously executive director of the Dart Center for Journalism and Trauma, based at the Columbia University Graduate School of Journalism, which was sunset by Columbia 2025. In 2014 Shapiro received the International Society for Traumatic Stress Studies Public Advocacy Award recognizing "outstanding and fundamental contributions to the social understanding of trauma." In 2025 he delivered the Annual Humanities Horizons Lecture at Trinity College Dublin, focusing on the relationship between violence, public storytelling and the rise of authoritarianism, a theme he echoed later that year in a keynote address at the ImedD International Journalism Forum in Athens.

Shapiro is a contributing editor at The Nation magazine and provides a weekly report on U.S. politics and culture to the Australian radio program Late Night Live. Has been an adjunct professor at Columbia Journalism School, where he taught ethics for more than a decade, and a lecturer at Yale University, where he has taught investigative journalism since 1994. Shapiro served on the board of directors and executive committee of the Global Investigative Journalism Network and is on the advisory board of the Rory Peck Trust based in London.

== Books ==
- Shapiro, Bruce (2003). Shaking the Foundations: 200 Years of Investigative Journalism in America. Nation Books. ISBN 1-56025-433-5.
- Shapiro, Bruce; Jackson, Jesse; Jackson, Jesse Jr. (2001). Legal Lynching: The Death Penalty and America's Future. The New Press. ISBN 1-56584-685-0.
