= Frank Ochberg =

American psychiatrist

- Born: 1940 (age 85–86); New York City
- Scientific career
- Fields: Psychiatry
- Workplaces: National Institute of Mental Health; Michigan Department of Mental Health; Gift from within CIAG; Dart Center for Journalism and Trauma

Frank Ochberg (born 1940), is a psychiatrist, a pioneer in trauma science, an educator and the editor of the first text on the treatment of post-traumatic stress disorder (PTSD). He is one of the founding fathers of modern psychotraumatology and served on the committee that defined PTSD. He is a graduate of Harvard and of Johns Hopkins Medical School.

Ochberg is a Clinical Professor of Psychiatry at Michigan State University, where he has also taught in the College of Human Medicine, College of Osteopathic Medicine, and the Schools of Journalism and Criminal Justice.

Ochberg has devoted time to educating journalists about trauma. The Dart Center established the Ochberg Fellowship, which is named after him. Fellows are selected on the basis of demonstrated writing ability and thorough investigation of their topics, and have included Pulitzer Prize-winning journalists.

He is a graduate of Harvard University and Johns Hopkins University medical school. From 1969 to 1979 he was a regional, division, and associate director of the National Institute of Mental Health. He then became director of the Michigan Department of Mental Health, a position he held for 3 years, from 1979 to 1981.

Ochberg had created a therapeutic treatment, the counting method, also known as Ochberg's counting method, designed to help with the desensitization of posttraumatic stress disorder (PTSD) symptoms.

He had also founded, headed or been part of a number of organizations dealing with PTSD and its treatment, including Gift From Within (founder), Critical Incident Analysis Group (founder) and The Dart Center for Journalism and Trauma (chairman emeritus).

== Personal life ==
Ochberg attended Camp Rising Sun in 1955 and 1956.

Ochberg has 3 children with Lynn Ochberg, his wife of almost 60 years. They live in Okemos, Michigan, near Michigan State University, where Ochberg has taught in the College of Human Medicine and the Schools of Journalism and Criminal Justice.

== Books edited ==
- Violence and the Struggle for Existence (with Daniels and Gilula), editor (1970, Little Brown and Company)
- Victims of Terrorism (with Soskis), editor (1982, Westview Press)
- Post-traumatic Therapy and Victims of Violence, editor (1988, Brunner Mazel)
- Survivor Psalm

== See also ==
- Robert D. Hare
- Symptoms of victimization
- Counting method
