= Columbia University Graduate School of Journalism =

Journalism school at Columbia University

Coordinates: 40°48′27″N 73°57′48″W

- Established: July 30th, 1912
- Founder: Joseph Pulitzer
- Parent institution: Columbia University
- Dean: Jelani Cobb
- Students: 279 (Fall 2024)
- Location: Manhattan, New York City, United States
- Website: journalism.columbia.edu

The Columbia University Graduate School of Journalism is the journalism school of Columbia University, located in the Morningside Heights neighborhood of Manhattan, New York City, United States.

Admissions to the school are highly selective; traditionally drawing upon an international student body. Alumni have gone on to win Pulitzer Prizes, or have become newsroom leaders in respected publications. The journalism school offers four graduate degree programs, in addition to offering professional development programs, fellowships, workshops and institutes, namely the Tow Center for Digital Journalism, the Brown Institute for Media Innovation, and until 2025, the Dart Center for Journalism and Trauma which is now the independent Global Center for Journalism and Trauma.

The school publishes the Columbia Journalism Review, facilities with the Pulitzer Prizes, and directly administers the Alfred I. duPont–Columbia University Award, the Maria Moors Cabot Prizes, the John Chancellor Award for Excellence in Journalism, the Lukas Prizes, the Oakes Prizes, the Meyer Berger Award, the Paul Tobenkin Memorial Award and the Dart Awards for Excellence in Coverage of Trauma. It also co-sponsors the National Magazine Awards with the American Society of Magazine Editors, which administers the program. The school has an accreditation from the Association for Education in Journalism and Mass Communication.

== History ==
=== Pulitzer School of Journalism ===
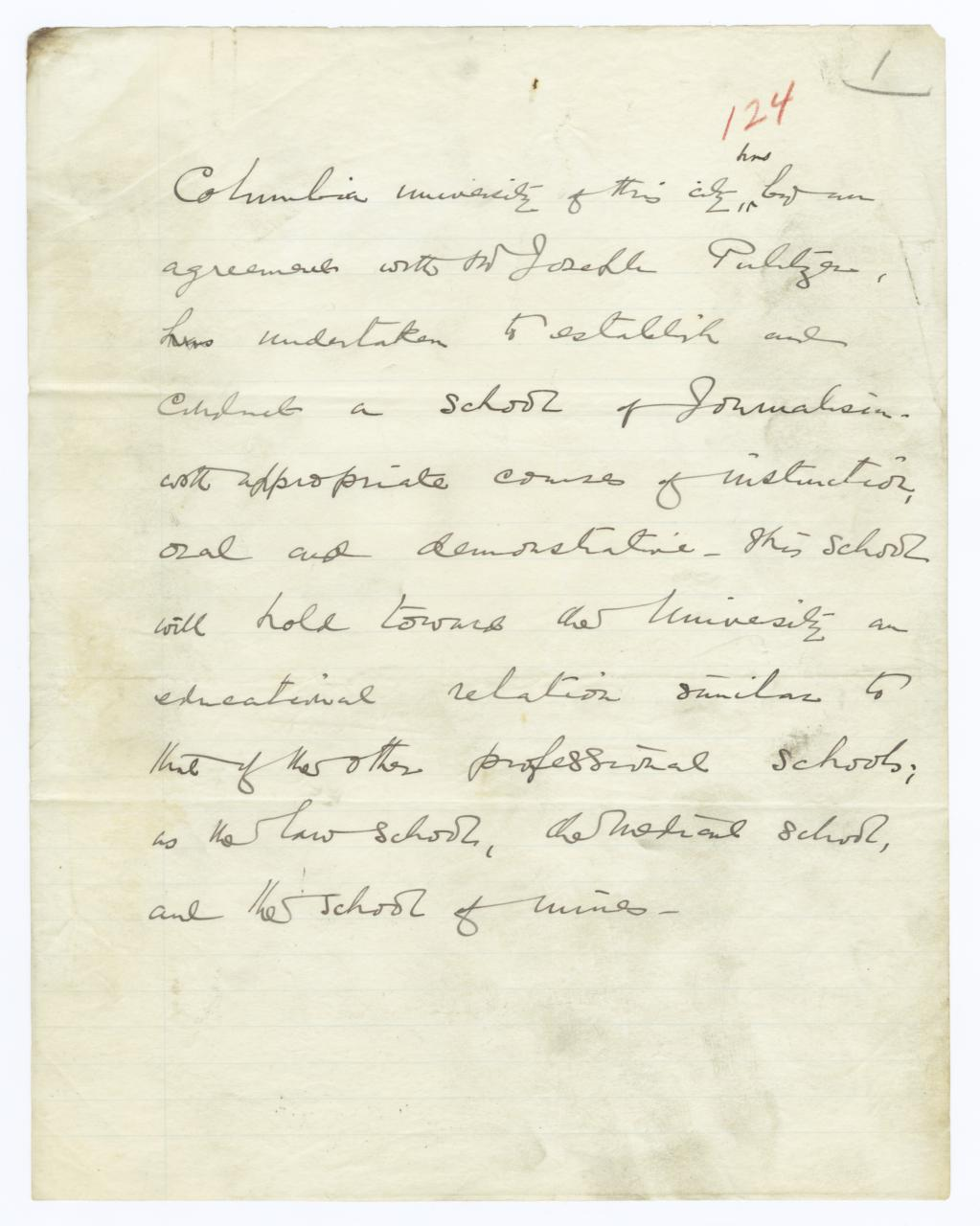
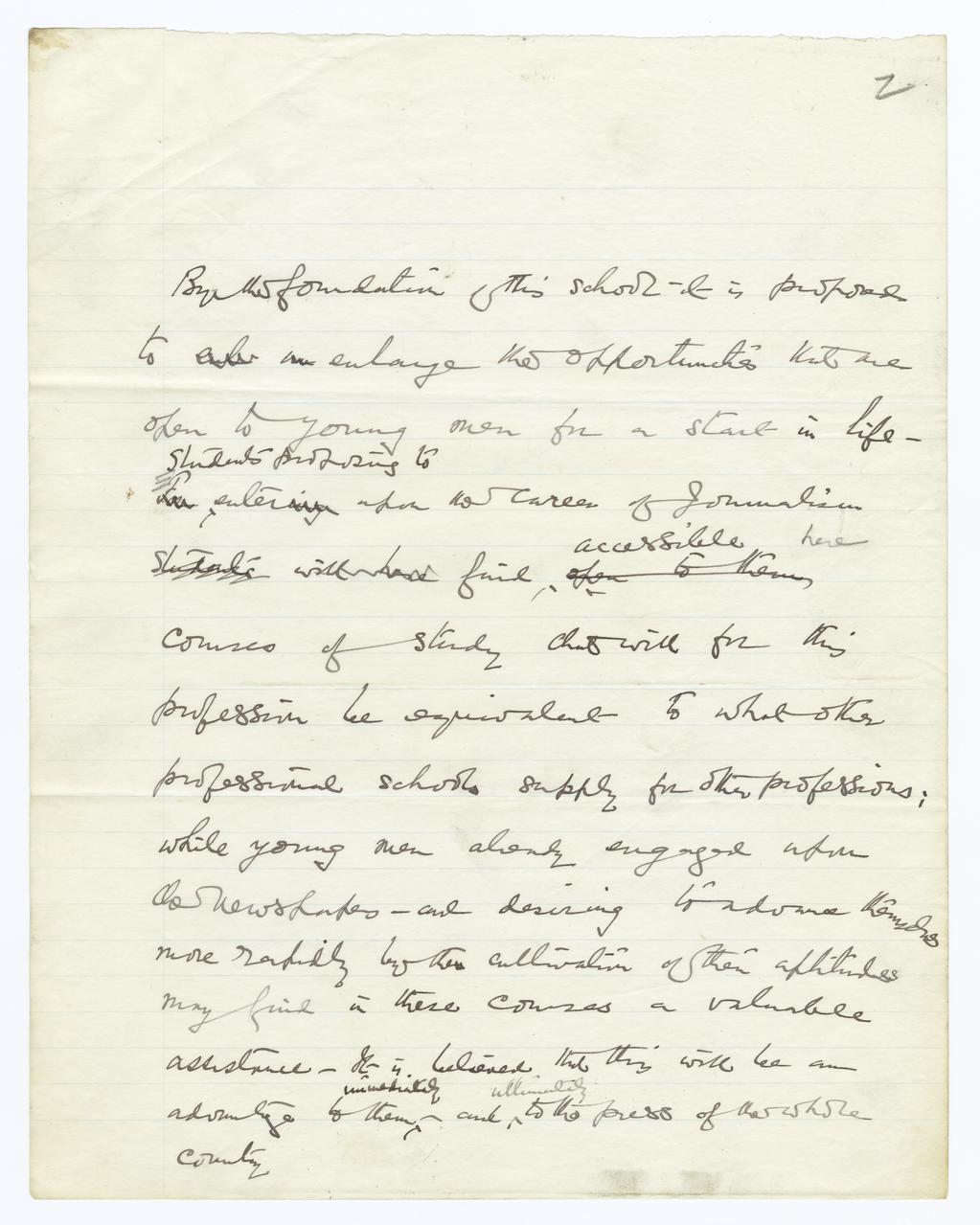
Draft agreement between Joseph Pulitzer and the university to endow the Graduate School of Journalism, c. 1908

In 1892, Joseph Pulitzer, a Hungarian-born newspaper magnate, offered Columbia University president Seth Low funding to establish the world's first school of journalism. He sought to elevate a profession viewed more often as a common trade learned through an apprenticeship. His idea was for a center of enlightened journalism in pursuit of knowledge as well as skills in the service of democracy. "It will impart knowledge—not for its own sake, but to be used for the public service," Pulitzer wrote in a now landmark, lead essay of the May 1904 issue of the North American Review. The university was resistant to the idea. But Low's successor, Nicholas Murray Butler, was more receptive to the plan.

Pulitzer was set on creating his vision at Columbia and offered it a $2 million gift, one-quarter of which was to be used to establish prizes in journalism and the arts. It took years of negotiations and Pulitzer's death in October 1911 to finalize plans. On September 30, 1912, classes began with 79 undergraduate and postgraduate students, including a dozen women. Veteran journalist Talcott Williams was installed as the school's director. When not attending classes and lectures, students scoured the city for news. Their more advanced classmates were assigned to cover a visit by U.S. President William Howard Taft, a sensational police murder trial and a women's suffrage march. A student from China went undercover to report on a downtown cocaine den. A journalism building was constructed the following year at 2950 Broadway and 116th Street on the western end of the campus. A statue of Thomas Jefferson was installed in June 1914 as a symbol of "free inquiry" exemplified by the debates between him and fellow American founder and Columbia alumnus, Alexander Hamilton, a statute of whom was unveiled directly across campus in front of Hamilton Hall six years earlier.

=== First journalism graduate school ===
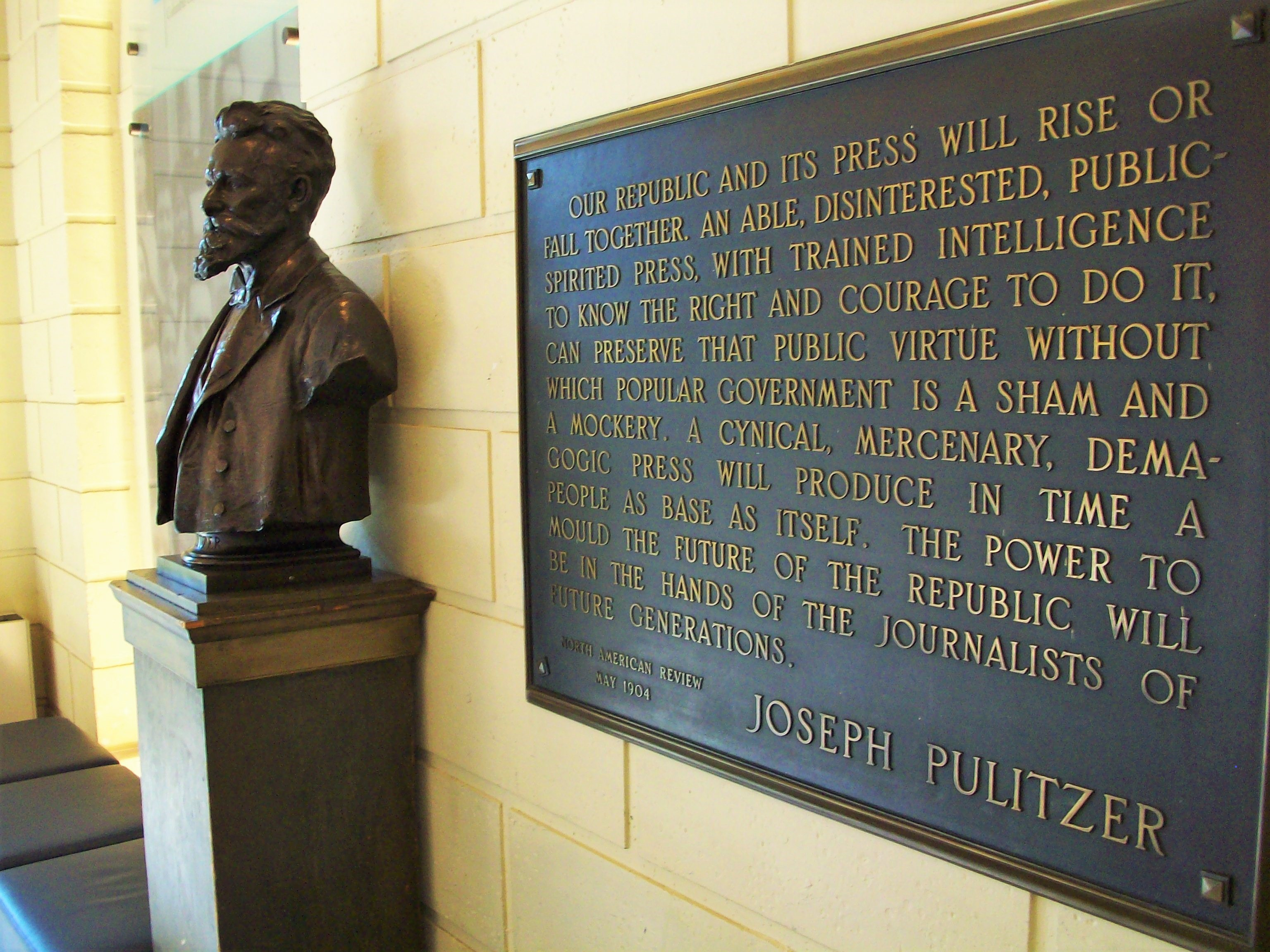
A bust of Joseph Pulitzer and plaque in the Columbia Journalism School lobby

In 1935, Dean Carl Ackerman, a 1913 alumnus, led the school's transition to become the first graduate school of journalism in the United States. As the school's reach and reputation spread (due in part to an adjunct faculty of working New York journalists and a tenured full-time faculty that included Pulitzer winners Douglas Southall Freeman and Henry F. Pringle and Life Begins at Forty author Walter B. Pitkin), it began offering coursework in television news and documentary filmmaking in addition to its focus on newspapers and radio. The Maria Moors Cabot Prizes, the oldest international awards in journalism, were founded in 1938, honoring reporting in Latin America and the Caribbean. The Alfred I. duPont-Columbia Awards for excellence in broadcast journalism moved to the school in 1968. In 1958, the Columbia Journalism Award, the school's highest honor, was established to recognize a person of overarching accomplishment and distinguished service to journalism. Three years later, the school began publishing the Columbia Journalism Review.

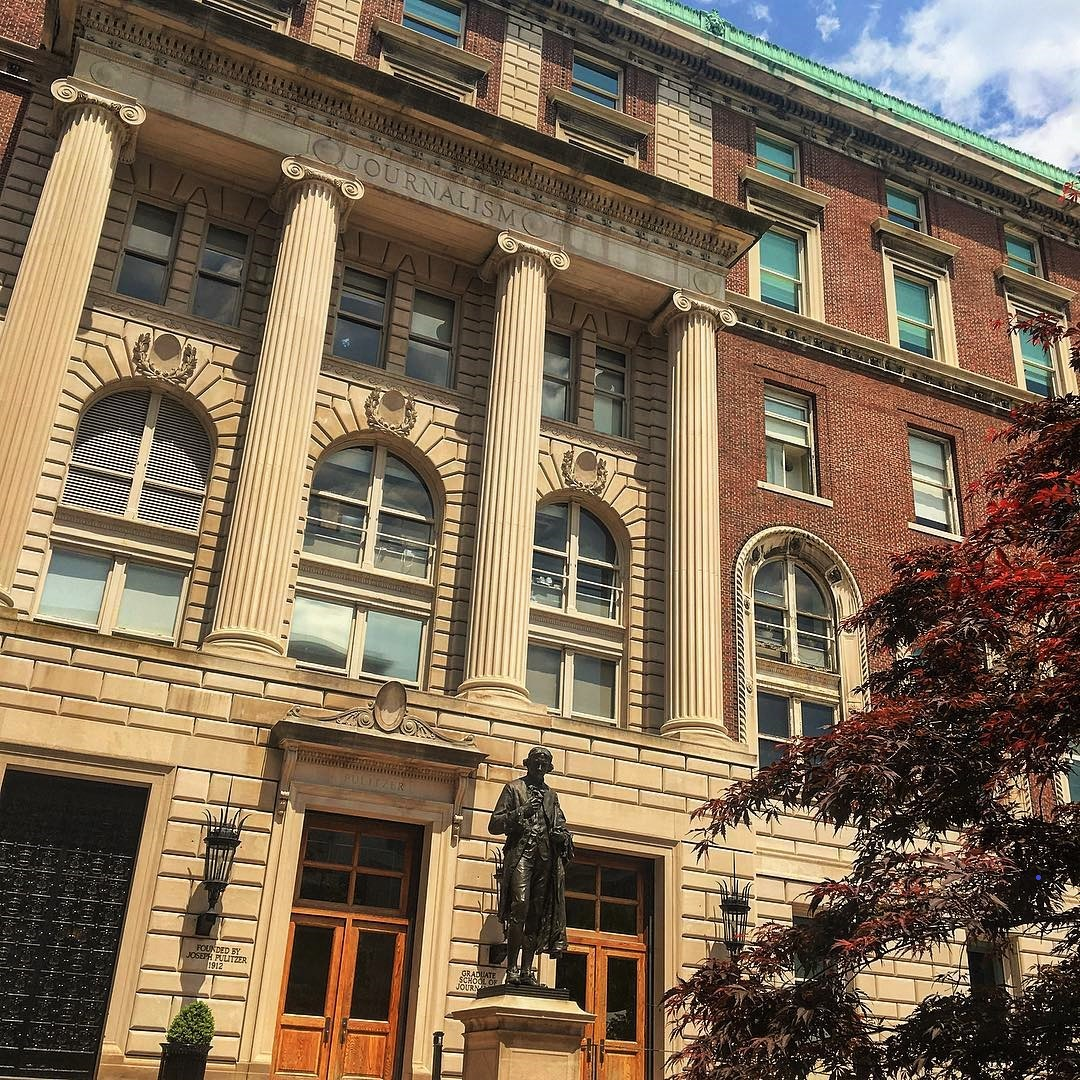
Pulitzer Hall

After joining the tenured faculty in 1950, veteran United Nations correspondent John Hohenberg became the inaugural administrator of the Pulitzer Prizes in 1954, a secondary appointment that he would hold until 1976. Ackerman was succeeded as dean in 1954 by former Assistant Secretary of State for Public Affairs Edward W. Barrett, who served until 1968. In 1966, the school began awarding the National Magazine Awards in association with the American Society of Magazine Editors. Former CBS News president Fred W. Friendly was appointed the same year to the tenured faculty and enhanced the broadcast journalism program alongside former NBC News correspondent Elie Abel, who served as dean from 1970 to 1979. Abel was succeeded by former Newsweek editor and prominent New York socialite Osborn Elliott (1979–1986), who in turn was succeeded by longtime Bill Moyers collaborator Joan Konner (1988–1996), the school's only female dean to date. By the 1970s, the Reporting and Writing 1 (RW1) course had become the cornerstone of the school's basic curriculum. The Knight‐Bagehot Fellowship was created in 1975 to enrich economics and business journalism. In 1985, the Delacorte Center for Magazine Journalism was founded. While serving as Pulitzer administrator, former The New York Times managing editor Seymour Topping joined the tenured faculty in 1994.

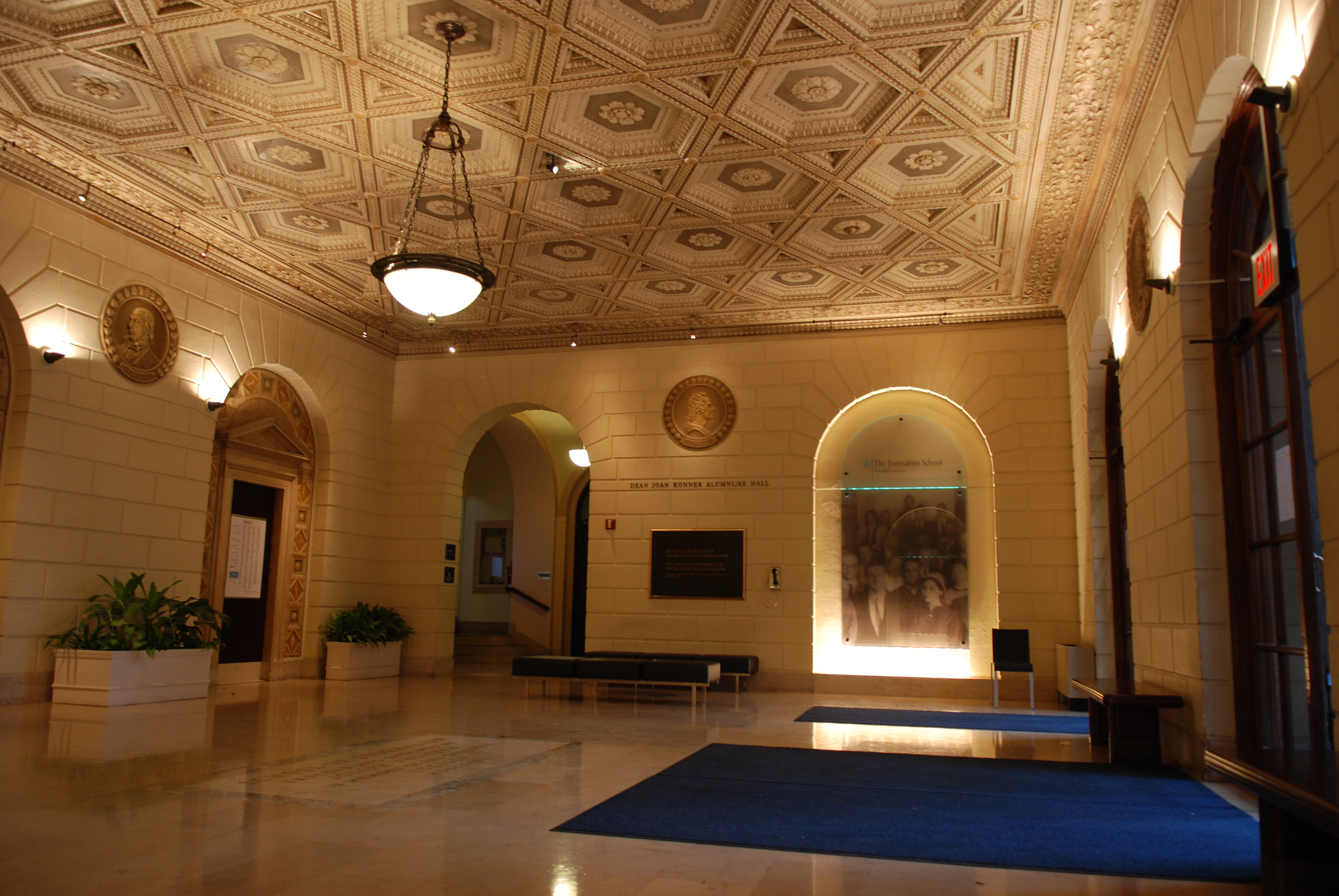
The Pulitzer Hall foyer

A doctoral program was established in 1998 by communications theorist James W. Carey, who emerged as an "editor of and contributor to many scholarly publications at a time when Columbia was urging journalism professors to do more academic research." In 2005, Nicholas Lemann, two years into his tenure as dean, created a second more specialized master's program leading to a master of arts degree, prompting the hiring of political journalist Thomas B. Edsall and music critic David Hajdu. As a result of industry changes forced by digital media, the school in 2013 erased distinctions between types of media, such as newspaper, broadcast, magazine and new media, as specializations in its master of science curriculum. The Toni Stabile Center for Investigative Journalism, dedicated to training select students interested in pursuing careers in investigative journalism, opened in 2006. A year later, the Spencer Fellowship was created to focus on long-form reporting. The Dart Center for Journalism and Trauma relocated to Columbia in 2009 to focus on media coverage of trauma, conflict and tragedy. In 2010, the Tow Center for Digital Journalism was created. The Brown Institute for Media Innovation was launched under the aegis of former Bell Labs statistician and data scientist Mark Henry Hansen in 2012.

== Academic programs ==
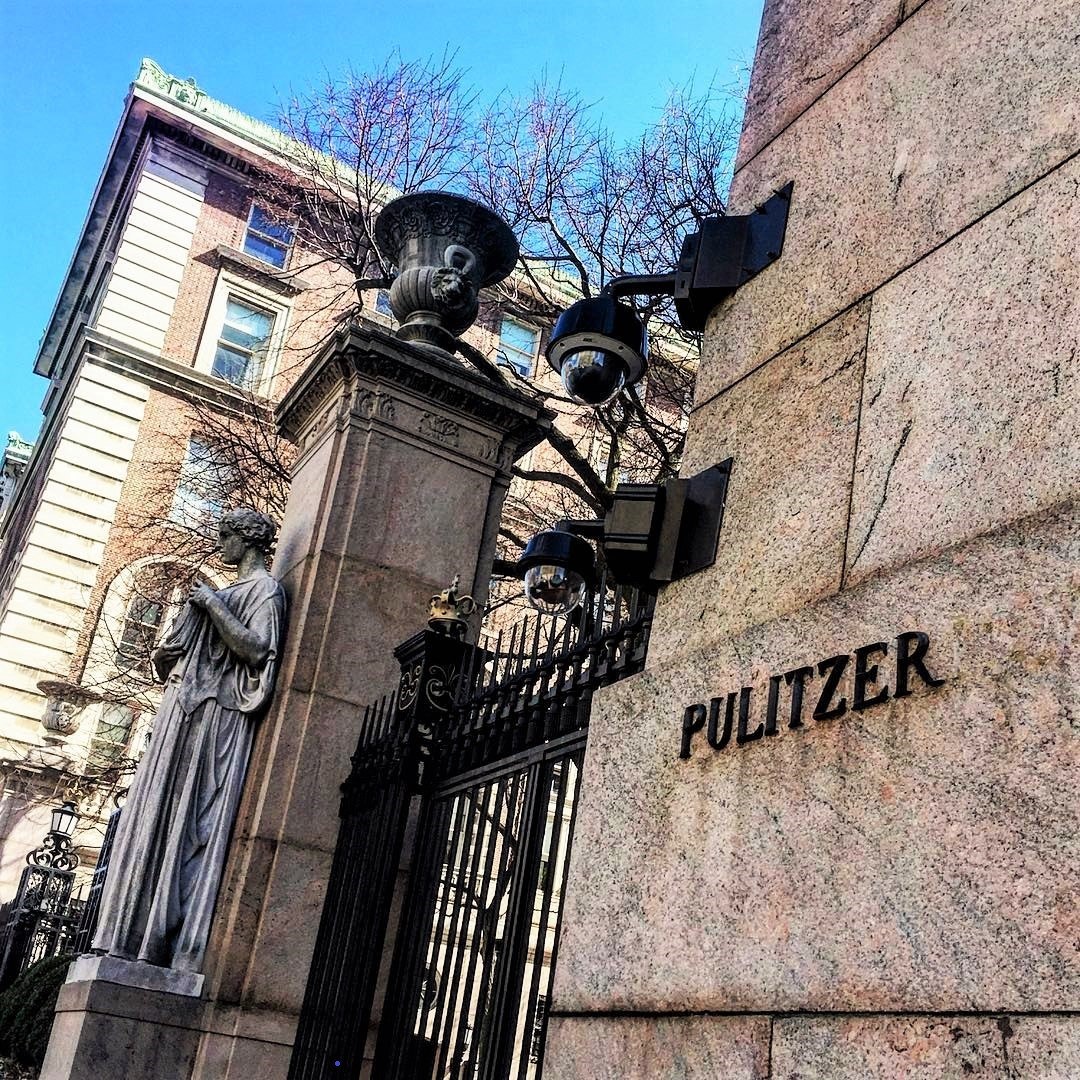
The Broadway and 116th Street Main Gate outside the Columbia Journalism School

The school's ten-month Master of Science (M.S.) program offers aspiring and experienced journalists the opportunity to study the skills, art and ethics of journalism by reporting and writing stories that range from short news pieces to complex narrative features. Some students interested in investigative reporting are selected to study at the Stabile Center for Investigative Journalism, a specialization of the M.S. program. Documentary and data journalism specialization programs are offered as well. The M.S. program is also offered on a part-time basis.

A year-long M.S. program in data journalism teaches the skills for finding, collecting and analyzing data for storytelling, presentation and investigative reporting.

The school offers several dual-degree programs in collaboration with other schools at Columbia: journalism and computer science, journalism and international affairs, journalism and law, journalism and business, and journalism and religion. The school also offers international dual-degree programs with Sciences Po in Paris, France and the University of Witwatersrand in Johannesburg, South Africa.

The smaller and more specialized, nine-month Master of Arts (M.A.) program is for experienced journalists interested in focusing on a particular subject area: politics, science, business and economics or arts and culture. M.A. students work closely with journalism professors and take courses in other academic departments and schools at the university. The program is full-time.

The doctoral program draws upon the resources of Columbia in a multidisciplinary approach to the study of communications. Ph.D. students craft individual courses of study to acquire deep knowledge in an area of concentration through research and coursework in disciplines ranging from history, sociology or religion to business or international affairs.

A six-week graduate-level course on book, magazine, and digital publishing, known as the Columbia Publishing Course, has been offered since 2000, when the program transferred from Radcliffe College.

== Weekly publications ==
The Bronx Beat, established in 1981 and published Mondays, has been the journalism school's weekly student publication. Uptown Radio is a weekly news magazine and podcast modeled after NPR's All Things Considered. It is produced by the students of the Radio Workshop, an advanced audio course at Columbia Journalism School. Uptown Radio has been the school's longest-running continuous webcast, broadcasting each Thursday at 4 pm, from February through May, since 1996. Uptown Radio contains original feature reports as well as interviews and newscasts in service of the listeners in New York City and the world beyond.

== Journalism awards ==
The Columbia Journalism School directly administers the Alfred I. duPont–Columbia University Award, the Maria Moors Cabot Prizes, the John Chancellor Award for Excellence in Journalism, the Lukas Prizes, the Oakes Prizes, the Meyer Berger Award, the Paul Tobenkin Memorial Award and the Dart Awards for Excellence in Coverage of Trauma. It also co-sponsors the National Magazine Awards with the American Society of Magazine Editors, which administers the program.

== Notable faculty ==
- Lisa Belkin, adjunct professor
- Daniel Alarcón, assistant professor
- Emily Bell, Leonard Tow Professor of Professional Practice in Journalism
- Helen Benedict, professor
- Nina Berman, professor
- Walt Bogdanich, adjunct professor
- Jelani Cobb, Ira A. Lipman Professor of Journalism, Dean
- Steve Coll, Henry R. Luce Professor of Journalism
- Sheila Coronel, Toni Stabile Professor of Professional Practice in Investigative Journalism
- John Dinges, Godfrey Lowell Cabot Professor Emeritus of Journalism
- Thomas B. Edsall, adjunct professor (not active as of fall 2020)
- Stephen Fried, taught narrative non-fiction magazine writing as adjunct professor
- Samuel G. Freedman, professor
- Howard W. French, professor
- Keith Gessen, George T. Delacorte Assistant Professor of Magazine Journalism
- Ari L. Goldman, professor
- Sig Gissler, adjunct professor; former administrator of the Pulitzer Prizes (not active as of fall 2020)
- Todd Gitlin, professor and chair, PhD program
- David Hajdu, professor
- LynNell Hancock, H. Gordon Garbedian Professor of Journalism
- Mark Henry Hansen, David and Helen Gurley Brown Professor of Journalism
- Richard R. John, professor
- Nicholas Lemann, dean emeritus; Joseph Pulitzer II and Edith Pulitzer Moore Professor of Journalism
- Dale Maharidge, professor
- Sylvia Nasar, John S. and James L. Knight Professor Emerita of Business Journalism
- Victor Navasky, George T. Delacorte, Jr. Professor Emeritus of Professional Practice in Magazine Journalism
- Charles Ornstein, adjunct associate professor
- Michael Schudson, professor
- Choire Sicha, adjunct assistant professor (not active as of fall 2020)
- Katya Soldak, journalist and documentary filmmaker (documentary The Long Breakup, 2020)
- James B. Stewart, Bloomberg Professor of Business Journalism
- Alexander Stille, San Paolo Professor of International Journalism
- Jonathan Weiner, Maxwell M. Geffen Professor of Medical and Scientific Journalism
