= Wang Zhuocheng =

Chinese actor

- Born: 19 September 1996 (age 29); Jiangxi, China
- Education: Central Academy of Drama
- Occupation: Actor
- Years active: 2018–present
- Agent: Huayi Brothers

Chinese name
- Simplified Chinese: 汪卓成
Transcriptions
Standard Mandarin
- Hanyu Pinyin: Wāng Zhuó Chéng

Wang Zhuocheng (Chinese: 汪卓成; born 19 September 1996) is a Chinese actor.

== Career ==
Wang graduated from the Central Academy of Drama, majoring in music. Thereafter, he was signed onto the agency Huayi Brothers.

In 2019, Wang gained recognition after starring in the xianxia drama The Untamed, receiving praise for his role as Jiang Cheng.

== Filmography ==
=== Television series ===
Year	English title	Chinese title	Role	Network	Notes/Ref.
2019	The Untamed	陈情令	Jiang Cheng	Tencent	
2019	Walk Into Your Memory	走进你的记忆	Yi Mingjun	Tencent	
2019	Sword Dynasty	剑王朝	Feng Qinghan	iQiyi	
2020	Legend of Two Sisters In the Chaos	浮世双娇传	Jiang Shao	Tencent	
2021	Rebirth For You	嘉南传	Zhao Xiao	Tencent	
2021	Lost Promise	胭脂债	Mei Ying Xue	Youku	
2022	Cupid's Kitchen	舌尖上的心跳	Wei Kete / "Victor"	iQiyi	
2022	Love Like the Galaxy	星汉灿烂	Crown Prince Yuan	iQiyi	Guest

== Discography ==
Year	English title	Chinese title	Album	Notes/Ref.
2019	"Goodbye With Hatred"	恨别	The Untamed OST	

== Awards and nominations ==
Year	Award	Category	Nominated work	Results	Ref.
2019	Tencent Video All Star Awards	Doki New Force	The Untamed	Won	
