= Lulu Xuan =

Chinese actress (born 1991)

- Born: Xuan Lu; 15 January 1991 (age 35); Nanjing, Jiangsu, China
- Education: Beijing Dance Academy; Central Academy of Drama
- Occupation: Actress
- Years active: 2008–present

Chinese name
- Chinese: 宣璐
Transcriptions

Lulu Xuan (Chinese: 宣璐; born 15 January 1991) is a Chinese actress. She debuted in the television series The Dream of Red Mansions (2010). She is best known for portraying Lanman Shandi in the historical television series Legend of SouthWest Dance and Music (2013) and Jiang Yanli in the xianxia web series The Untamed (2019). She rose to fame with her lead role in Well-Dominated Love.

== Filmography ==
=== Film ===
| Year | English title | Chinese title | Role | Notes |
|---|---|---|---|---|
| 2013 | Misfire | 弹无虚发 | Dan Qing | |
| 2014 | Midnight Hair | 夜半梳头 | Xiao Han | |
| 2016 | Man Hunters | 侠捕 | Ding Chan'er | |

=== Television series ===
| Year | English title | Chinese title | Role | Notes |
|---|---|---|---|---|
| 2009 | Girl Rushes Forward | 女孩冲冲冲 | Lu Xiao | |
| 2010 | The Dream of Red Mansions | 红楼梦 | Xue Yan | |
| 2013 | Blood Promise | 血誓 | Long Xiu | |
| 2013 | Legend of SouthWest Dance and Music | 舞乐传奇 | Lanman Shandi | |
| 2014 | Mother's Scheme | 娘心计 | Xiao Nan | |
| 2014 | Expiration Date to Fall in Love with You | 有效期限爱上你 | Jiang Li | |
| 2015 | Midnight Taxi | 午夜蝴蝶 | Lin Fangfang | |
| 2015 | Yangko Dance | 大秧歌 | Huai Hua | |
| 2015 | The Ferryman 2 | 灵魂摆渡2 | Fei Cui | |
| 2016 | The Ferryman 3 | 灵魂摆渡3 | Fei Cui / Hu Po | |
| 2017 | City of Smoke | 决币 | Zhao Yuan | |
| 2017 | As Flowers Fade and Fly Across the Sky | 花谢花飞花满天 | Hua Pingting | |
| 2018 | Ruyi's Royal Love in the Palace | 如懿传 | Princess Hengchuo | |
| 2018 | Royal Highness | 回到明朝当王爷之杨凌传 | Princess Yongfu / Zhu Xiuning | |
| 2019 | The Untamed | 陈情令 | Jiang Yanli | |
| 2019 | Arsenal Military Academy | 烈火军校 | Bai Biyun | |
| 2019 | The Gravity of a Rainbow | 彩虹的重力 | He Caihong | |
| 2019 | Angel's Eyes | 天使的眼睛 | An Xiaotong | |
| 2020 | Fairyland Lovers | 蓬莱间 | Ling Long | |
| 2020 | Well Dominated Love | 奈何BOSS又如何 | Nie Xingchen | |
| 2020 | Something Just Like This | 青春创世纪 | Zhang Jiayun | |
| 2021 | Song of Youth | 玉楼春 | Pan Xiniang | Guest appearance |
| 2021 | Miss Crow with Mr. Lizard | 乌鸦小姐与蜥蜴先生 | Chen Wenwen | Guest appearance |
| 2021 | Stand By Me | 梦醒长安 | Qiu Yanzhi / Wang Ruoqing | |
| 2021 | The Unknown: Legend of Exorcist Zhong Kui | 问天录 | Liu Hanyan | |
| 2022 | Who Rules the World | 且试天下 | Feng Qiwu | |
| 2023 | Divine Destiny | 尘缘 | Gu Qing | |
| 2024 | Love and Sword | 只此江湖梦 | Rong Shukuang | |
| 2024 | The Legend of Shen Li | 与凤行 | Liu Yu | |
| 2024 | The Last Cook | 末代廚娘 | Qin Yao | |
| 2024 | Melody of Golden Age | 长乐曲 | Xu Wan | |

=== Television show ===
| Year | English title | Chinese title | Role | Notes |
|---|---|---|---|---|
| 2019 | Miss Voice | 这样唱好美 | Contestant | |

== Discography ==
| Year | English title | Chinese title | Notes |
|---|---|---|---|
| 2019 | "Remaining Life" | 余生漫漫 | |
| 2020 | "Love Express" | 爱情速递 | with Cao Yuchen |
