= Cupid's Kitchen =

- Official Poster
- Also known as: Heartbreak at the Tip of the Tongue
- Chinese: 舌尖上的心跳
- Hanyu Pinyin: Shéjiān shàng de xīntiào
- Genre: Food, Romance, Comedy
- Based on: Heartbreak at the Tip of the Tongue (舌尖上的心跳) by Jiao Tang Dong Gua (焦糖冬瓜)
- Written by: Meng Yao
- Directed by: Li Jun
- Starring: Ruan Jingtian; Song Zu'eri; Liu Dongqin; Wang Zhuocheng; Wang Ruizi; Xu Jiawen; Liu Linger
- Country of origin: China
- Original language: Mandarin
- No. of seasons: 1
- No. of episodes: 40

Production
- Producer: Liu Tao
- Production locations: Shanghai, Hangzhou, Shaoxing, Wuzhen
- Cinematography: Chen Hao

Original release
- Network: Zhejiang Television; Tencent Video iQIYI; Youku
- Release: January 13 – January 30, 2022

Cupid's Kitchen (Chinese: 舌尖上的心跳; pinyin: Shéjiān shàng de xīntiào) is a 2022 inspirational youth urban emotional Chinese drama based on Jiao Tang Dong Gua's novel of the same name, directed by Li Jun and starring Ethan Juan, Song Zu'er, Liu Dongqin, Wang Zhuocheng, Wang Ruizi, Xu Jiawen, and Liu Linger. It tells the story of Lin Kesong, a girl with an amazing sense of taste, who happens to meet Jiang Qianfan, a chef in the Chinese gourmet world, and they start a story of food and love together. The drama will be broadcast on Zhejiang Satellite TV from January 13, 2022, and will be broadcast simultaneously on Tencent Video, iQiyi, and Youku Video.

== Plot ==
Lin Ke-Song (played by Song Zu-Er), a girl with the gift of taste, has a secret crush on her classmate Song Yi-Ran (played by Liu Dong-Qin). While working at a hotel in Hangzhou, she accidentally meets Jiang Qian-Fan (played by Ruan Jing-Tian), a famous Michelin-starred chef who has lost his sense of taste. Song Yi-Ran invites Lin Ke-Song to dinner. She is mistaken as a participant in a taste-testing group in a private room at a restaurant where Jiang Qian-Fan cooks a dish for the group to provide feedback on. Lin Ke-Song realizes she is at the wrong place, sneaks out of the room & joins Song Yi-Ran at the right table where he receives a call from his current girlfriend.

Jiang Qian-Fan reviews all of the feedbacks from the taste-test, but rejects all 14 of them. He finds out there was 15 feedbacks, but one was thrown out, because it said there was a double grassy taste & there was no name. He, urgently, urges his staff to find the girl with the rare gift of taste. He has a chance meeting with her at a restaurant where she is crying, eating & upset because she was fired from her hotel job. He hires her for 3 days to take him to all the best places to eat in Hangzhou. Along the way, he tests her ability of taste & realizes her gift of taste is genuine.

Lin Ke-Song finds out at a party Song Yi-Ran is leaving for Shanghai to live with his new girlfriend & his older brother can provide a position for him there. She decides to follow him there, staying at her uncle's place. Her cousin, Lin Xiao-Yu (played by Liu Ling-Er), enters a culinary contest, Future Culinary Star, & takes Lin Ke-Song with her as company, but is not allowed in unless she is a registered contestant. During the preliminary competition, Lin Ke-Song makes the worst dish & is dubbed "Evil Dragon Princess" by the film crew covering the competition.

Jiang Qian-Fan finds out his former girlfriend, Elise Quentin (played by Xu Xia-Wen), kept information about the competition which he is invited to be a mentor to one of the contestants from him because of his condition. He decides to join the competition & searches for a disciple.

Jiang Qian-Fan decides to take on Lin Ke-Song as his new apprentice, teaches her cooking skills, & prepare to participate in the main cooking competition for the Future Culinary Star in three months time. Although, Lin Ke-Song has a genuine sense of taste, she knows nothing about cooking. After Jiang Qian-Fan's strict training and rigorous techniques, Lin Ke-Song actually develops her own set of special cooking skills, and she gradually finds confidence in her culinary skills and becomes a better version of herself.

In the culinary competition, Jiang Qian-Fan goes up against Boris, his nemesis who studied under the same culinary teacher, Mr. Montgomery. Boris hates Jiang Qian-Fan & vows to destroy him, because their teacher didn't chose him for a major culinary competition. Boris decides to mentor Lin Ke-Song's cousin, Lin Xiao-Yu, a chef in her own right, who hates Lin Ke-Song, because Jiang Qian-Fan (her idol) didn't choose her. During the competition, Lin Xiao-Yu & Victor Quinton (Elise's younger brother & culinary genius) plays dirty tricks on Lin Ke-Song. Lin Ke-Song against all odds makes it into the semi-finals & then the finals. In the semi-finals, Lin Ke-Song goes up against Lin Xiao-Yu which ends badly, because in the final minutes, Lin Xiao-Yu gets badly burned while trying to use a blow torch to finish her dish. In the finals, the mentors cook with their disciples. Jiang Qian-Fan loses his sight due to overdosing of a medication taken to counteract a slow acting poison his former girlfriend, Elise, gave to him in an effort to make him rely on her & become a couple again. He decides to continue on in the finals with Lin Ke-Song. She wins 2nd place in the finals against Victor & his mother, the Queen of Desserts. Afterwards, Jiang Qian-Fan & Lin Ke-Song realize they are in love & complement each other.

Song Yi-Ran gradually falls in love with Lin Ke-Song even though he is in love with Chu Ting. He eventually realizes he has nothing to show for himself in his life & is inspired by Lin Ke-Song to be a better version of himself.

Jiang Qian-Fan recovers his sense of taste & sight by taking an illegal experimental drug Elise purchased which can reactivate the nerves which have atrophied or died. The drug causes intense pain & could potentially damages internal organs. Jiang Qian-Fan who had gone into a forest to take the drug, would have died if Lin Ke-Song hadn't found him in time & got him to a hospital.

== Cast ==
=== Main ===
Sources:

- Ruan Jingtian as Jiang Qianfan
- Song Zu'er as Lin Kesong
- Liu Dongqin as Song Yiran
- Wang Ruizi as Chu Ting

=== Supporting ===
- Wang Zhuocheng as Victor Quentin
- Xu Jiawen as Elise Quentin, Jiang Qian-Fan's former girlfriend
- Liu Ling-Er as Lin Xiao-Yu
- Zhang Jun-Ming as Li Yan
- Lu Si-Yu as Dr. Xie
- Qiao Yu-Ting as Mrs. Quentin
- Andrey Lazarev as Boris
- Rambo as Blue
- Shi Yu as Lin Feng
- Wang Kan as Huang Shi
- Zhang Fan as Lin Ke-Song's father
- Li Xiaohong as Lin Ke-Song's mother
- Tuo Zong-Hua as Thomas
- Wu Hong as Song Yi-Sen
- Wang Si-Yuan as Xiao Pa
- Liu Ya-Peng as Barley
- Xing En as Victor's girlfriend K
- Zhang Peng as Gundam
- Luxembourg as Marco
- Wang Bo-Qing as Ao Ri-Xin
- Zang Zhong as Axiong
- Chang Yuan as Chang Yuan
- Zhuang Fu-Yi as Lili
- Chen Yang as Chef Chen
- Anqi Liu as Lin Xiao-Yu

== Soundtrack ==
Title	Lyrics	Music	Singers	Ref
Love is food (Theme Song)	Liao Junjia	Liao Junjia	Liao Junjia, Tong Sen	
Hungry Thoughts (飢餓的念頭)	Tong Sen	Liao Junjia	Liao Junjia	
Hungry mind	Liao Junjia	Liao Junjia	Liao Junjia	
Perfect guest	Liao Junjia	Liao Junjia	Liao Junjia	
Me and myself	Liao Junjia	Liao Junjia	Tong Sen	
Special one	Liao Junjia	Meng Jun	Tong Sen	
Lost in you	Tong Sen	Meng Jun	Tong Sen	
Echo	Liao Junjia	Meng Jun, Liao Junjia	Liao Junjia	
Sweet Table (甜蜜餐桌)	Tong Sen	Liao Junjia	Liao Junjia	

== Production ==
=== Props making ===
The delicacies presented in the show are all Michelin-level, and the gourmet props come from professional brands from more than 15 countries and regions, including Italy, Germany, the United Kingdom, Denmark, Sweden, Canada, Thailand, etc., including nearly a thousand pieces of top kitchen utensils and Tableware and other items; the crew also specially invited some independent designer brands, tailor-made for the setting of the top international food part in the plot, and the personality of the characters in the play. In addition, the crew also invited more than ten experts to form a gourmet consultant team to give advice on the selection of ingredients, production technology, dish design, and even food presentation. At the same time, the behind-the-scenes team of the show also built more than 2,000 square meters of shed built-in scenery.

=== Script writing ===
The play has conducted research on the content of the plot, integrating a series of elements such as food, inspiration, love, and youth. The storyline is more plump and delicate.

=== Shooting process ===
On May 28, 2019, the show was officially launched; on September 11, the show was announced to be completed.
