= List of The Untamed episodes =

The Untamed (Chinese: 陈情令; pinyin: Chén Qíng Lìng) is a 2019 Chinese web series loosely based on the BL xianxia novel Mo Dao Zu Shi by Mo Xiang Tong Xiu, starring Xiao Zhan and Wang Yibo. It began airing in China on Tencent Video from June 27, 2019. The series follows the adventures of two cultivators who travel to solve a series of murder mysteries, eventually finding and defeating the true culprit. The series is produced by Tencent Penguin Pictures, and filmed from April 2018 to August 2018 at Hengdian World Studios. Cheng Wai Man and Chen Jia Lin are credited as the show's directors, and the producers are credited to be Fang Feng, Yang Xia, Wang Chu and Liu Ming Yi.

The series aired every Thursday and Friday (GMT +08:00) with two episodes each, with Tencent VIP members able to access two more episodes ahead of time. On the first day of its release, a total of six episodes were available to VIP members. On June 30, 2019, their official Weibo released an official trailer and a new schedule, shifting the release to Monday till Wednesday. This series completed broadcast August 20, 2019 with the 50th episode. On July 29, 2019, during an official fanmeeting event, Tencent announced that VIP members would be able to watch all the episodes on August 7 instead.

== Episodes ==
No.	Title	Directed by	Written by	Original release date	VIP Early Access
1	"Episode 1"	Cheng Wai Man, Chen Jia Lin	Yang Xia	27 June 2019	27 June 2019
The notorious Yiling Patriarch Wei Wuxian was killed by his brother Jiang Cheng, sparking joy in many. 16 years later, he is reincarnated into the body of Mo Xuanyu through a sacrificial ritual and tasked to exact revenge on Mo Xuanyu's abusive family for him. He then meets the young disciples of the Gusu Lan sect in Mo Village and gets caught up in a zombie mystery. While the situation is deemed too difficult, the disciples decide to seek help from their senior and Wei Wuxian's long-time acquaintance, Lan Wangji. Cautious, Wei Wuxian hides from him to avoid meeting again after such a long time. After finding out that the Mo Family are controlled by a certain Stygian Tiger Seal, Lan Jingyi speculates that Wei Wuxian might not be dead. The latter then escapes and Lan Wangji tries to give chase but fails.
2	"Episode 2"	Cheng Wai Man, Chen Jia Lin	Yang Xia	27 June 2019	27 June 2019
As Wei Wuxian arrives in Mt. Dafan, he meets a group of cultivators who are there to investigate a mystery about a soul-eating beast. There, he meets blacksmith Zheng's daughter Ah Yan and her mother. Later, he finds that Ah Yan is cursed by the Heavenly Lady Statue. Then, Wei Wuxian meets another young disciple, Jin Ling from the Jin sect, whose traps in the forest have wrongly captured those cultivators. Jin Ling recognises him as Mo Xuanyu and the two argue until Jiang Cheng arrives. The Gusu Lan sect also finds them and tension forms between the clans before they part. While Wei Wuxian freshens up by the river, he remembers his older sister and Jiang Cheng from the past, and overhears the cultivators talking about Jin Ling. He then realises that Jin Ling is Jin Rulan who was orphaned because of him. At the same time, the disciples of the Gusu Lan and Lanling Jin sects go to a temple to investigate a Heavenly Lady statue. Trouble arises when the statue becomes animated and starts attacking. To save them, Wei Wuxian cuts a stick from nearby bamboo trees and makes a flute. He then uses his demonic abilities and unintentionally summons the Ghost General Wen Ning. This sparks suspicions from Jiang Cheng and Lan Wangji but Wei Wuxian plays dumb in order to hide his identity. But Wei Wuxian suddenly collapses and the timeline changes to 16 years ago, starting the flashbacks of Wei Wuxian's teenage years.
3	"Episode 3"	Cheng Wai Man, Chen Jia Lin	Yang Xia	28 June 2019	27 June 2019
The Jiang sect disciples fail to find lodging for the night in Caiyi Town as the inn is fully booked by the wealthy Lanling Jin sect's Jin Zixuan. Jiang Cheng and Wei Wuxian grow to dislike Jin Zixuan's attitude and question the arranged marriage between him and Jiang Yanli. The Jiang sect also fails to enter the Cloud Recesses early as they had lost their visiting pass. Just then, Lan Wangji and some Gusu Lan sect disciples come back carrying a corpse. Wei Wuxian tries to reason with Lan Wangji to allow them in but is silenced by his spell. At night, Jiang Yanli worries for Wei Wuxian but Jiang Cheng tries to assure her that he will be fine as long as he does not cross the line. Afterwards, Lan Wangji comes to bring them in. Wei Wuxian finally comes back after buying two jars of his Emperor's Smile wine and finds the Yunmeng Jiang sect disciples to be missing. He then breaks into the Cloud Recesses to find them but stops to enjoy his wine on the roof. He is caught red-handed by Lan Wangji and the two fight over the rules that Wei Wuxian has broken. The fight ends when Lan Wangji breaks one of the jars and Wei Wuxian is then brought to meet Lan Qiren and Lan Xichen to be punished. But ultimately, the four begin to investigate the mysterious corpse that is brought in. Over at Nightless City, Wen Ruohan sends Wen Qing to the Cloud Recesses in order to search for a piece of the Stygian Iron that is similar to the one found on Mt. Dafan, to which Wen Qing requests to bring her dear brother Wen Ning along. Later, Xue Yang angers Wen Ruohan when he laughs at how the latter does not believe in the true power of the Stygian Iron. Xue Yang continues to taunt him as he does not fear death and only wants meaning in his life, Wen Ruohan then assures that he will grant Xue Yang's requests once he finds all four pieces of the Stygian Iron. However, Xue Yang refuses to tell him where the last piece can be found unless he is allowed to go to Yueyang.
4	"Episode 4"	Cheng Wai Man, Chen Jia Lin	Yang Xia	28 June 2019	27 June 2019
The Cloud Recesses begins the offering ceremony where all the clans are required to introduce themselves to teacher Lan Qiren with gifts. During Qinghe Nie sect's Meng Yao's introduction, two disciples begin to gossip about him being the illegitimate son of Jin Guangshan. Lan Xichen then approaches Meng Yao to praise his talent and choice of present. Then, the Qishan Wen sect arrives at the Cloud Recesses and barges into the classroom in the middle of Jiang Cheng's introduction. Wei Wuxian hates Wen Chao's arrogant behaviour and a fight almost breaks out, causing the other disciples to also unsheathe their swords. Lan Xichen stops the fight with his Liebing flute. After, in Lan Qiren's room, Lan Xichen raises his concern over Qishan Wen sect's sudden infiltration and their connection with the mysterious puppets. After the meeting, Lan Xichen meets Meng Yao who is waiting to say his goodbyes. Though Lan Xichen wishes for him to stay, Meng Yao is only a guest and not student. When Wei Wuxian and Nie Huaisang are catching fish in the back mountains, Wei Wuxian finds Wen Qing lurking around and finds it suspicious. The next day, classes have officially begun. Wei Wuxian's rebellious behaviour in class causes Lan Qiren to quiz him a series of questions. However despite his intelligence, his solution of using the forbidden demonic cultivation angers Lan Qiren and he is sent out of class. Wei Wuxian then finds Wen Ning who is practicing archery and gives him guidance. When he sees Wen Qing loitering around the mountains once again, he goes to investigate out of curiosity but is caught by Lan Wangji.
5	"Episode 5"	Cheng Wai Man, Chen Jia Lin	Yang Xia	1 July 2019	27 June 2019
Wei Wuxian wants to investigate the back mountains but Lan Wangji pulls him to the Library Pavilion for his punishment. Wei Wuxian gets bored of copying passages and decides to apologise to Lan Wangji by justifying his actions from that night. However, Lan Wangji finds him a bother and shuts him up with the silencing spell again. In the room of the Wen siblings, Wen Ning expresses concern over his sister's constant disappearances. But Wen Qing instead laments over her inability to cure Wen Ning's illness despite being a physician. Back in the Library Pavilion, Wei Wuxian finally finishes the punishment and gives Lan Wangji a drawing of his portrait as a farewell gift from supervising him. Wei Wuxian then replaces Lan Wangji's book with a homoerotic pornography art book, causing Lan Wangji to tear it apart with anger and tell him to leave. When Wei Wuxian, Jiang Cheng and Nie Huaisang are hanging out, they spot a magical owl that is used by the Qishan Wen sect for spying and this raises questions among themselves. Meanwhile, Lan Wangji and Lan Xichen learn of the unusual appearance of water ghouls in Caiyi Town and decide to visit the next day. Wei Wuxian, Jiang Cheng and the Wen siblings also tag along. While the group scouts BiLing Lake for water ghouls, Wei Wuxian discovers one hiding below Lan Wangji's boat, impressing Lan Xichen with his wits. However, the water ghouls form a Waterborne Abyss and the disciples hurriedly fly up to safety. Seeing that Wen Ning is still trapped on the boat with Su She, Wei Wuxian comes to help but sees that Wen Ning's eyes has gone all white. He loses balance from the shock and Lan Wangji saves all three of them from the capsizing boat. Back in the Wen siblings' room, Wei Wuxian is concerned about Wen Ning.
6	"Episode 6"	Cheng Wai Man, Chen Jia Lin	Yang Xia	1 July 2019	27 June 2019
At night, the trio drink wine together but are discovered by Lan Wangji. To prevent Lan Wangji from complaining, Wei Wuxian casts a talisman spell on him to get him to drink as the other two escape. However, one cup knocks him out cold so Wei Wuxian lays him on the bed. When Wei Wuxian tells him that his headband is slanted, Lan Wangji panics and fails to straighten it, but also prevents Wei Wuxian from helping as no outsiders should touch such a sacred item. The next day, the trio and Lan Wangji are punished. After Lan Xichen's recommendation to heal the injuries in the Cold Spring, Wei Wuxian joins Lan Wangji. Suddenly, the two are pulled into the water and emerge in an icy cold cave. The guqin resting on the platform sends waves of attack at Wei Wuxian as he is not of the Gusu Lan sect, so he urges Lan Wangji to borrow his headband's spiritual power. The latter obliges and ties it on both their wrists. Lan Wangji then plays Inquiry on the guqin, causing Lan Yi to materialize. The two then learns of her story and the Stygian Iron. While outside, everyone is looking for them.
7	"Episode 7"	Cheng Wai Man, Chen Jia Lin	Yang Xia	2 July 2019	28 June 2019
Lan Yi entrusts the piece of the Stygian Iron to Wei Wuxian and Lan Wangji, telling them not to repeat her mistakes. As she fades away, both of them assure that they will do their best in protecting the Stygian Iron. They finally emerge from the cave and meet Wen Qing and Jiang Cheng. Wei Wuxian then lies about what is inside, keeping the piece a secret. The two then bring it to Lan Qiren and Lan Xichen, and they discover that the Qishan Wen sect is indeed there only for the piece. In Nightless City, Wen Ruohan orders Xue Yang to find the piece in Yueyang, displeasing Wen Chao. Back in the Cloud Recesses, the disciples release sky lanterns to make wishes. However, Mianmian's excitement over Jiang Yanli's and Jin Zixuan's marriage causes the latter to walk off. Wei Wuxian is angry and wants justice for breaking Jiang Yanli's heart. A fight breaks out, both clans' leaders are called over the next day, and the marriage is called off. Lan Qiren, Lan Xichen and Jiang Fengmian then discuss the Stygian Iron before Lan Wangji comes for something confidential. At the end, Wei Wuxian worries that Lan Wangji is going to look for the other pieces himself.
8	"Episode 8"	Cheng Wai Man, Chen Jia Lin	Yang Xia	2 July 2019	28 June 2019
Wen Chao comes to Lan Xichen's room that night to ask about the secrets in the back mountains. When Lan Xichen refuses, Wen Chao threatens to hurt Lan Wangji instead. Wei Wuxian abandons the journey back home and catches up with Lan Wangji, neither realizing that the Qishan Wen sect has eyes on them. They arrive at Tan Zhou and bump into Nie Huaisang who also has not gone home. Concurrently at the Lotus Pier, Jiang Yanli wishes Jiang Cheng well as he sets off to find Wei Wuxian. When the piece suddenly reacts, the trio come to a residence that has long been destroyed by Wen Chao and the piece there taken. As Wen Qing transmits a message to Wen Chao on Wen Ruohan's behalf, Wen Chao accuses her of protecting Wei Wuxian and Lan Wangji. Subsequently, Wen Chao unseals the Heavenly Lady statue in a temple on Mt. Dafan. Jiang Cheng arrives at an inn and meets Wen Qing who is also resting there with the Qishan Wen sect disciples. The two order the exact same dishes, turning it into a competition and Jiang Cheng gets annoyed. Wen Qing stops him from leaving and pretends to fight, she instead informs him secretly that Wei Wuxian is in danger. On the other hand, the trio look for lodging in a village on Mt. Dafan and are given directions to sleep in the temple. At night, the statue suddenly becomes animated and attacks them. Lan Wangji and Wei Wuxian seals the statue again. Puppets invade the temple and Nie Huaisang wonders if they have been tricked.
9	"Episode 9"	Cheng Wai Man, Chen Jia Lin	Yang Xia	3 July 2019	1 July 2019
Wen Qing arrives in time to lure the puppets away; Jiang Cheng has come with her too. After Wen Qing reveals that killing the loitering owl is the only way to break the Stygian Tiger Seal's spell, Wei Wuxian and Lan Wangji go to fight the bird while the forest is shrouded with thick fog. The two then join the others at a burial mound, which Wen Qing explains belongs to her sect, a subgroup of the Qishan Wen sect that specialises in medicine. Afterward, Wei Wuxian and Lan Wangji try to interrogate Wen Qing about the truth of why the Heavenly Lady statue suddenly consumed human souls. But Wen Qing does not want to disclose and leaves the party to return to the Nightless City. With her efforts to save them being known to Wen Chao, Jiang Cheng worries for her safety, but Wei Wuxian says that they will all meet each other again eventually. The remaining four then arrive in Yueyang and receive news of the mysterious disappearance of the Yueyang Chang sect. After the Stygian Iron reacted violently, they, excepting Nie Huaisang, immediately go to investigate.
10	"Episode 10"	Cheng Wai Man, Chen Jia Lin	Yang Xia	3 July 2019	1 July 2019
Xue Yang is the culprit behind the merciless murder of the Yueyang Chang sect, and Xiao Xingchen and Song Lan arrive to stop him. However, the group are unable to find the Stygian Iron that Xue Yang has hidden and hence decide to bring him along to Qinghe to be punished. Before they part, Wei Wuxian asks Xiao Xingchen about Baoshan Sanren, his late mother's teacher. In the Unclean Realm, sect leader Nie Mingjue welcomes the party and locks Xue Yang up. Additionally, Meng Yao is often seen being bullied by the Chief General. That night, Lan Wangji leaves for Gusu while he bids goodbye to the oblivious and drunk Wei Wuxian sleeping on the roof. The Qishan Wen sect attacks the next day to demand for Xue Yang and his piece. When Nie Mingjue hurries to find Xue Yang who has escaped, he witnesses Meng Yao murdering the Chief General. While Meng Yao denies and blames Xue Yang for it, he jumps in to save Nie Mingjue from a stab. Wen Chao then threatens that Qinghe will undergo the same catastrophe as the Cloud Recesses if they continue to resist. He ends with another taunt towards Wei Wuxian. Later, Nie Mingjue decides to execute Meng Yao for his crimes and the latter allows him. However, seeing as Meng Yao saved him earlier, Nie Mingjue spares his life and kicks him out of Qinghe Nie sect instead.
11	"Episode 11"	Cheng Wai Man, Chen Jia Lin	Yang Xia	8 July 2019	2 July 2019
Meng Yao bids goodbye to Nie Huaisang, Jiang Cheng, and Wei Wuxian. After concluding that the Cloud Recesses is in danger, Jiang Cheng and Wei Wuixian return to the Lotus Pier in fear of the Qishan Wen sect invading. Luckily, the Lotus Pier is unharmed and the two reunite with their family, including their mother Yu Ziyuan (Madame Yu). During dinner, Madame Yu and Jiang Fengmian have a heated argument about the two sons and Qishan Wen sect's upcoming lecture. Over at the Nightless City, Wen Ruohan punishes a disciple in front of Wen Qing in order to teach her a lesson. In Gusu, the eldest son Wen Xu leads the burning of the Cloud Recesses and kills many innocent disciples. Lan Qiren hides in the Hantan Cave with the surviving disciples while Lan Xichen escapes with their ancient books. Lan Wangji also willingly gives himself up, his right leg gets injured and the Stygian Iron is handed over. At Nightless City, the head disciples of the other four sects gather, including Lan Wangji.
12	"Episode 12"	Cheng Wai Man, Chen Jia Lin	Yang Xia	8 July 2019	2 July 2019
Wen Chao demands that everyone hand over their swords and memorize the Qishan Wen Sect Essence Collection by the next day. In Wei Wuxian and Jiang Cheng's room, Wei Wuxian fails to leave and find Lan Wangji as they are forbidden from leaving their rooms. The following day, Lan Wangji, Wei Wuxian, and Jin Zixuan are called out to recite the rules, but Wei Wuxian steps out to recite Gusu's rules instead to prank Wen Chao. As punishment, they are ordered to lay manure in the garden. During the work, Wei Wuxian tries to talk to Lan Wangji about the Cloud Recesses in private but is caught by Wen Chao. The latter uses his whip to tie and hit Wei Wuxian, even injuring Lan Wangji's leg further when he tries to stop Wen Chao. Wei Wuxian is then locked up in the dungeon with a ferocious beast. Due to Wei Wuxian's intense fear of dogs and the beast trying to eat him, he is injured and worn out. However, the beast is suddenly knocked out by Wen Ning, who also hands him some medicine for his injuries in secret. The next day, Wei Wuxian returns to join the others while still putting up his usual cheerful facade. In the Wen sibling's room, Wen Qing pleas with Wen Ning not to interfere with Wei Wuxian and get in trouble as he is the only family she has left. As the disciples recite the rules out loud, a disturbance is reported on Muxi Mountain and Wen Chao decides to use the disciples as bait to capture the beast. While everyone searches for the beast on the mountain, Wei Wuxian offers to carry Lan Wangji on his back because of his leg injury.
13	"Episode 13"	Cheng Wai Man, Chen Jia Lin	Yang Xia	9 July 2019	3 July 2019
Lan Wangji refuses to be carried and continues to walk. As Wei Wuxian still worries, he creates a paper doll to speak with Wen Qing secretly and asks for a short break. After the break, they are still unable to find the cave. Wei Wuxian then uses his powers to locate it. While inside, they find the bottom of the cave and Wen Chao wants a sacrifice to be the bait for the beast. When his lover Wang Lingjiao suggests Mianmian, Jin Zixuan and Lan Wangji step in to protect her. This angers Wen Chao and he orders for the disciples to be killed. This give Wei Wuxian an opportunity to recite one of Qishan Wen sect's rules to Wen Chao and the latter scolds that it is absurd. Wei Wuxian retorts back that these were the words of Wen Mao and Wen Chao has broken one of their own rules, which carries a death penalty. The fight continues, awakening the sleeping beast. Everyone then begins to fight the beast. Taking this as an opportunity, Wang Lingjiao orders some Qishan Wen sect disciples to hold Mianmian. Seeing that Wang Lingjiao is about to hurt Mianmian's face with a hot burning iron stamp of Qishan Wen sect, Wei Wuxian comes in between them. The stamp hits his chest. The Qishan Wen sect escapes, cuts off the escape ropes, and blocks the cave entrance with rocks. Luckily, another opening is found underwater and the remaining disciples escape. As Wei Wuxian needs to hold off the beast, he is unable to run away. Lan Wangji saves him from a blow and the both of them are then left behind to wait for rescue. While they warm up by the fire, Wei Wuxian tends to Lan Wangji's wound, even using his sacred headband as a rope for the makeshift leg cast.
14	"Episode 14"	Cheng Wai Man, Chen Jia Lin	Yang Xia	9 July 2019	3 July 2019
The beast is revealed to be Xuanwu of Slaughter, the very same that Xue Chonghai once controlled. Wei Wuxian and Lan Wangji come up with a plan to kill the beast by using Gusu's Chord Assassination Technique and having Wei Wuxian drive the beast out of its shell from the inside. While Wei Wuxian explores the insides of the beast, he finds many corpses that have their soul sucked out, to which Lan Wangji adds that it sounds like the Stygian Iron's power. Wei Wuxian also encounters a sword full of resentful energy and uses it to attack Xuanwu. The resentful energy overpowers Wei Wuxian and causes him to use dark abilities to attack Xuanwu. With both his and Lan Wangji's efforts, the beast is finally killed. In the Nightless City, Wen Ruohan orders Wen Chao to have Wen Xu find the last piece of the Stygian Iron from Xue Yang. Back in Xuanwu Cave, Lan Wangji heals Wei Wuxian while humming a song that he has named 'Wangxian', however Wei Wuxian doesn't hear the name before he passes out. Wei Wuxian wakes up to find that Jin Zixuan and Jiang Cheng have worked together to save them. Wei Wuxian returns to the Lotus Pier with Jiang Cheng and reunites with the family again. However, Jiang Fengmian's favoring of Wei Wuxian angers Yu Ziyuan. The couple argues again, making Jiang Cheng uncomfortable. After the pair leaves, Wei Wuxian chases after Jiang Cheng to assure him that he will be the next sect leader despite what everyone else is saying.
15	"Episode 15"	Cheng Wai Man, Chen Jia Lin	Yang Xia	10 July 2019	8 July 2019
The Qishan Wen sect's sudden assassination on the Pinyang Yao sect causes Jiang Fengmian and Jiang Yanli to hurry to Lanling for help. Days later, Wang Lingjiao arrives at Lotus Pier to have Yu Ziyuan punish Wei Wuxian for his behavior in Muxi Mountain. Without Jiang Fengmian around, Jiang Cheng is unable to stop her and Wei Wuxian receives a number of strokes from her Zidian. But Wang Lingjiao is still unhappy, and wants Yu Ziyuan to cut off his right hand. While Yu Ziyuan is about to do so, Wang Lingjiao reveals the plans for Lotus Pier to become the Qishan Wen sect's Supervisory Office. Hearing this, Yu Ziyuan turns to slap her instead. The two fight until Wen Zhuliu comes to aid Wang Lingjiao and the latter also releases the Qishan Wen sect signal. Seeing that danger is coming, Yu Ziyuan hands Zidian over to Jiang Cheng and forcefully ties them with Zidian sending the brothers away to seek safety. Jiang Fengmian and Jiang Yanli arrive home in time to see the two sons tied up on the boat. Even though Jiang Cheng insists for the family to fight the Qishan Wen sect together, Jiang Fengmian goes to find Yu Ziyuan himself, leaving the three siblings tied with Zidian, in tears and afraid for their parents.
16	"Episode 16"	Cheng Wai Man, Chen Jia Lin	Yang Xia	10 July 2019	8 July 2019
After the Zidian ties loosen, the three row their way back to Yunmeng. In the Lotus Pier, the fight commences and Yu Ziyuan is overpowered by the Qishan Wen sect. Jiang Fengmian arrives to aid, but is brutally stabbed. Unable to handle the pain, Yu Ziyuan stabs herself and falls on the ground to hold his hand as they pass together. Wei Wuxian and Jiang Cheng are too late, and witnesses their parents' bodies on the ground. Jiang Cheng runs away in anguish while Wei Wuxian chases. In pain from losing his parents, Jiang Cheng yells at Wei Wuxian and hits him. The two sleep on the field and go to find Jiang Yanli the next day. While the three find lodging in an inn, Wei Wuxian discovers that the Qishan Wen sect is hot on their heels and decides to bring Jiang Cheng and Jiang Yanli away to safety. But Jiang Cheng has gone to Lotus Pier and Wei Wuxian chases after him once again, after making sure Jiang Yanli will go to Meishan and wait. In the now-ruined Lotus Pier, he finds help from Wen Ning. However, as Wei Wuxian is left hiding and waiting on the boat, he is plagued by his worries.
17	"Episode 17"	Cheng Wai Man, Chen Jia Lin	Yang Xia	15 July 2019	9 July 2019
Wen Ning successfully saves Jiang Cheng from the Qishan Wen sect and promises to deliver the latter's parent's bodies. He then brings Wei Wuxian, Jiang Cheng and Jiang Yanli to Yiling. Wei Wuxian's trust in the Wen siblings is challenged when some Qishan Wen sect disciples come to question the sudden commotion. Wen Qing then lies to them and agrees to hide the Yunmeng Jiang siblings in the Yiling Supervisory Office. In their room, Wen Qing diagnoses Jiang Cheng and finds a worrying issue. Jiang Cheng has lost his Golden Core to Wen Zhuliu. After waking up, Jiang Cheng tells Wei Wuxian that the same happened to his parents before they died. Seeing Jiang Cheng losing control, Wei Wuxian resolves to find a way to retrieve his Golden Core. He spends many days without food and sleep, worrying both Wen Qing and Jiang Yanli, to the point where Wen Qing also joins to find a cure. Finally, Wei Wuxian finds a solution, but this comes with a great price to pay. Meanwhile, Wen Chao is determined to find and kill them.
18	"Episode 18"	Cheng Wai Man, Chen Jia Lin	Yang Xia	15 July 2019	9 July 2019
While on a hunt in the mountains, Wei Wuxian finds an unconscious Song Lan. He brings the injured man back and Wen Qing heals him. Song Lan explains that Xue Yang has destroyed the Baixue Temple and poisoned his eyes to blind him. He then recalls looking for Baoshan Sanren with Xiao Xingchen but being left on the mountain by himself. With this, Wei Wuxian thinks of a way to convince Jiang Cheng to retrieve his Golden Core back. That night, Wei Wuxian asks Wen Qing for sleeping powder. He and Jiang Yanli then enjoy Lotus Pork Rib Soup and reminisce about when Wei Wuxian first arrived in the Lotus Pier. Then, Jiang Yanli is knocked out long enough for Song Lan to bring her to Lanling and regroup with Lan Wangji. The next day, Wei Wuxian leads Jiang Cheng up the mountains to find Baoshan Sanren. With the strict conditions of not taking off his blindfold, Jiang Cheng manages to find the mysterious woman. He introduces himself as Wei Wuxian as pre-planned and answers all her questions without failure before being led away. At the same time, the other three great clans work together to take down the Qishan Wen sect, naming this movement "The Sunshot Campaign".
19	"Episode 19"	Cheng Wai Man, Chen Jia Lin	Yang Xia	16 July 2019	10 July 2019
Wei Wuxian waits for Jiang Cheng on the streets. When he enters a tea-house, he is ambushed by the Qishan Wen sect and captured. Wen Chao tortures him and throws him into the Burial Mounds to die. The overwhelming resentful energy causes Wei Wuxian to succumb to the dark power of the mysterious sword previously found in the Xuanwu Cave. Three months later, Jiang Cheng is still unable to find Wei Wuxian and decides to regroup with Lan Wangji. The two attack Nightless City to look for answers, and learn Wei Wuxian's fate. Jiang Cheng and Lan Wangji the receives Wei Wuxian's sword SuiBian. However, Lan Wangji believes that Wei Wuxian is still alive somewhere. They then join Jin Zixuan and Jiang Yanli at the reclaimed Unclean Realm of Qinghe Nie Sect. Lan Wangji and Jiang Cheng then propose to Nie Mingjue to start the war against the Qishan Wen sect in Yiling. Over at Wen Chao's room, Wang Lingjiao is constantly plagued by the fear of Wei Wuxian coming back to haunt her. As she decides to run away with their stash of treasure, a mysterious flute sounded near her.
20	"Episode 20"	Cheng Wai Man, Chen Jia Lin	Yang Xia	16 July 2019	10 July 2019
With the music of the flute, the man gives Wen Chao vivid hallucinations. Wen Zhuliu escapes with Wen Chao. The man, revealed to be Wei Wuxian, then makes Wang Lingjiao hang herself. Jiang Cheng and Lan Wangji arrive after to find that someone has already helped them to kill the Qishan Wen sect disciples in the area using unusual methods. They discover that the same person has also been reversing the effects of the talismans to attract evil spirits. Jiang Cheng then saves Wen Qing from the underground dungeon and urges her to leave the Qishan Wen sect. However, she is unable as she still has Wen Ning and her family to take care of. Ultimately, Jiang Cheng finally gifts her a comb and offers his help before leaving. Jiang Cheng and Lan Wangji arrive at Wen Chao's hiding place and hide on the roof to watch him and Wen Zhuliu. They find that Wen Chao is gravely injured and unstable. Not long after, flute sounds come and Wei Wuxian shows himself to try and kill Wen Chao. Lan Wangji and Jiang Cheng step in to finish off Wen Zhuliu. The three finally reunite and find that Wei Wuxian has become a different person. Lan Wangji warns him of the consequences of practicing demonic cultivation and fears that he will not be able to control it. Wei Wuxian argues that Lan Wangji should not interfere with Yunmeng Jiang Sect's business. Lan Wangji leaves in anguish. Wei Wuxian then kills Wen Chao. The Yunmeng Jiang brothers then return to the Lotus Pier to pay their respects to their late parents and meet up with Jiang Yanli in the Unclean Realm of Qinghe Nie Sect.
21	"Episode 21"	Cheng Wai Man, Chen Jia Lin	Yang Xia	17 July 2019	15 July 2019
The two Yunmeng Jiang siblings and Nie Huaisang share a heartfelt reunion with Wei Wuxian. However, something about him doesn't seem right. In the Nightless City, Wen Ruohan learns of Wen Chao's death. Back in the Unclean Realm, the representatives of each sect come together to celebrate Wei Wuxian's return. But some cultivators openly insult the fact that he lacks his sword and discuss about his weird way of killing Wen Chao. Halfway through the dinner, Wei Wuxian leaves to drink his wine alone and Jiang Cheng follows. Jiang Cheng asks why he doesn't have his sword but Wei Wuxian simply replies that he doesn't want to. That night, he practices his demonic energy and Jiang Yanli enters the room after. She asks for the name of Wei Wuxian's new flute and the latter names it "Chen Qing". In the Nightless City, Wen Ruohan uses the Stygian Iron pieces to create puppets. The next day, Jiang Cheng is unable to find Wei Wuxian for the sect meeting. Jiang Yanli finds him using his flute on the mountain, which affects the group of Qishan Wen Sect prisoners below. When she confronts him, Wei Wuxian lies that it was the wind. Wei Wuxian shows up to the meeting midway, only to leave again. After, Lan Wangji wishes to look for Wei Wuxian but decides against it. Jiang Yanli spots him and begins to ask about Wei Wuxian. When the latter finds them, he gets mad at Lan Wangji for telling his sister about his demonic cultivation but it was a misunderstanding. While Wei Wuxian rushes to apologise to Lan Wangji, the two fights and Lan Wangji asks where his sword is.
22	"Episode 22"	Cheng Wai Man, Chen Jia Lin	Yang Xia	17 July 2019	15 July 2019
Wei Wuxian and Lan Wangji sit on the roof to finally talk. Wei Wuxian explains that he is not using Xue Chonghai's demonic cultivation, but rather a crafty cultivation that uses music to control things. Lan Wangji offers to help him and Wei Wuxian accepts. The next day, they start their Sunshot Campaign again. However, due to the overwhelming power of the puppets using the Stygian Iron, the Yunmeng Jiang Sect and Lanling Jin Sect are unable to defeat them. In the base camp, Jiang Cheng and Jin Zixuan discuss their odds against Wen Ruohan with Nie Mingjue. Then, Lan Xichen appears with a battle formation plan for the Nightless City to aid them. While Wei Wuxian and Lan Wangji are inspecting the puppets, they are informed that something has happened to Jiang Yanli. Wei Wuxian hurries to find her crying because of Jin Zixuan. He then confronts him and Mianmian explains that it was all because Jin Zixuan has misunderstood Jiang Yanli. However, Wei Wuxian attacks Jin Zixuan and the other Lanling Jin disciples in rage, causing Lan Wangji to stop him personally. On the other hand, Lan Xichen keeps a secret about who helped him escape during the burning of the Cloud Recesses and came up with the battle formation. The battle formation eventually leads the team into the Nightless City and slaughter ensues. While Nie Mingjue fights Wen Ruohan, it is revealed that Meng Yao is the person behind this. Seeing that the puppets are increasingly stronger, Wei Wuxian resorts to using his cultivation to control them.
23	"Episode 23"	Cheng Wai Man, Chen Jia Lin	Yang Xia	22 July 2019	16 July 2019
Wen Ruohan confronts Wei Wuxian about his powers and the latter reveals that he uses what he calls the "Stygian Tiger Seal". While the two fight, Meng Yao uses the opportunity to kill Wen Ruohan, revealing himself as Lan Xichen's inside man. Wei Wuxian collapses from overusing his power. Three days later, Wei Wuxian awakes and learns from Jiang Yanli that Lan Wangji has been playing his guqin to calm his soul. Lan Wangji continues to play until they hear pleas coming from outside. Lan Wangji then explains that the remaining people of the Qishan Wen Sect are being captured and killed, and the three Stygian Iron pieces have been destroyed. Meanwhile, Jin Guangshan has reclaimed Meng Yao as his son again, now renamed as Jin Guangyao. Outside, Lan Wangji asks Wei Wuxian where he has gotten the Stygian Tiger Seal and Wei Wuxian explains that he has invented it by using the Stygian Sword he found back in Xuanwu Cave. They then hear the pleas of the Qishan Wen Sect again and rush to stop Jin Zixun from killing the innocent, elderly, and weak. At the same time, Lan Xichen, Nie Mingjue and Jin Guangyao become sworn brothers. That night, the four great clans gather to celebrate the end of the Qishan Wen Sect. During the party, Wei Wuxian and Lan Wangji spend the time outside, away from the crowd. Back inside, Jin Guangshan pressures Jiang Cheng to reconsider the marriage between Jiang Yanli and Jin Zixuan.
24	"Episode 24"	Cheng Wai Man, Chen Jia Lin	Yang Xia	22 July 2019	16 July 2019
Wei Wuxian butts in to say that the decision-making should go to Jiang Yanli. The discussion ends with Jiang Yanli deciding that they should focus on rebuilding the Lotus Pier instead. Subsequently, Jin Guangyao and Jin Guangshan announce a hunting event in Phoenix Mountain. After the party, Jin Guangyao reports to Jin Guangshan about the whereabouts of the last piece of Stygian Iron. Since the Stygian Tiger Seal might be linked to the Stygian Iron, Wei Wuxian will be monitored by Jin Guangyao. In the Lotus Pier, the three Yunmeng Jiang siblings start rebuilding their clan and reminisce about their childhood. In the Cloud Recesses, Lan Wangji is working hard to practice guqin scores and Lan Xichen is intrigued. Lan Qiren then calls them over to discuss about Wei Wuxian. He orders Lan Xichen to handle him and Lan Wangji to reformulate the house rules. Back in the Lotus Pier, Jiang Cheng is overwhelmed with the responsibilities of being the sect leader and Wei Wuxian has disappeared again. Turns out, Wei Wuxian is drinking in town and meets Lan Xichen. The two drink wine in the inn and Lan Xichen asks about Lan Wangji's determination in practicing the scores for "Cleansing" and concerns over Wei Wuxian's forbidden techniques. However, Wei Wuxian refuses their help and leaves. He returns to the Lotus Pier at night and argues with Jiang Cheng. He then finds Jiang Yanli cleaning their late parents' altar and they promise that the three siblings will remain together forever. Wei Wuxian finds Jiang Cheng eavesdropping and the two talk while Jiang Yanli goes to prepare soup. In the Cloud Recesses, Lan Wangji breaks into the Forbidden Room.
25	"Episode 25"	Cheng Wai Man, Chen Jia Lin	Yang Xia	23 July 2019	17 July 2019
Jin Zixuan comes to the Lotus Pier to personally invite the Yunmeng Jiang siblings to the hunting event in Phoenix Mountain. The event starts with Jin Zixuan showing off his ability to shoot a bulls-eye while a row of Qishan Wen Sect prisoners stood as obstacles. When Jin Zixun challenges the other disciples, Wei Wuxian steps out to hit all of the targets at one go while blindfolded. The event then officially starts and Wei Wuxian blows his flute to make monsters to enter Yunmeng Jiang's camp. He then meets Lan Wangji and the two are uncertain about their importance to each other, though Wei Wuxian answers that he used to treat Lan Wangji as a soulmate. They overhear Jin Zixuan speaking unkindly to Jiang Yanli again, and Wei Wuxian steps in. This attracts a crowd of the other Jin Sect royals and Jin Zixun continuously badmouths Wei Wuxian. Angered, Wei Wuxian almost strikes before Lan Wangji and Jiang Yanli calm him down. Jiang Yanli speaks up for her brother while Wei Wuxian cries silently. When Lan Xichen and Jin Guangyao arrive, the latter gets insulted by Madame Jin and Jin Zixun. While Wei Wuxian tries to bring Jiang Yanli away, Jin Zixuan finally confesses his true feelings, leading Jiang Yanli to make her final decision to follow them to the Carp Tower. Wei Wuxian visits the town to drink and meets a disheveled Wen Qing. Elsewhere, Lan Wangji expresses his wish to Lan Xichen about hiding Wei Wuxian in the Cloud Recesses.
26	"Episode 26"	Cheng Wai Man, Chen Jia Lin	Yang Xia	23 July 2019	17 July 2019
During the private party in the Carp Tower, Jin Zixun forces Lan Xichen and Lan Wangji to drink wine despite the Cloud Recesses' rules. While Lan Xichen reluctantly accepts one, Wei Wuxian suddenly arrives and drinks Lan Wangji's wine instead. Wei Wuxian then asks Jin Zixun for Wen Ning. Tension arises and Wei Wuxian loses control. His threats and power intimidate Jin Zixun and the latter finally answers where Wen Ning and remaining Qishan Wen Sect survivors are. Wei Wuxian goes to Qiongqi Path with Wen Qing. At the same time, Lan Wangji goes to find Wei Wuxian. After a long search under the pouring rain, Wei Wuxian and Wen Qing find dead Wen Ning among other corpses. Devastated and enraged, Wei Wuxian plays his flute to threaten the Lanling Jin Sect guards and summons Wen Ning as a fierce corpse. However, Wei Wuxian loses control of Wen Ning and absorbs the resentful energy in the air to help stop him. After, Wei Wuxian rounds up the other Qishan Wen Sect survivors to escape but is stopped by Lan Wangji.
27	"Episode 27"	Cheng Wai Man, Chen Jia Lin	Yang Xia	24 July 2019	22 July 2019
Wei Wuxian has expected that he and Lan Wangji would eventually fight to death one day, so he expresses his wish to be killed by Lan Wangji himself if that ever happens. Lan Wangji then reluctantly lets Wei Wuxian and the Qishan Wen remnants go. In the Carp Tower the next day, a meeting with the other sects is held once again to discuss about Wei Wuxian's crimes. While many — including Nie Mingjue — insult and doubt Wei Wuxian, Lan Wangji and Mianmian try to defend him. When no one else sticks up for Wei Wuxian, Mianmian chooses to leave the Lanling Jin sect and Lan Wangji leaves the venue early. After the meeting, the three sworn brothers discuss Wei Wuxian again. However, only Lan Xichen does not believe Wei Wuxian would create a fierce corpse. In the Cloud Recesses, Lan Qiren punishes Lan Wangji for not stopping Wei Wuxian. Back in the Carp Tower, Jin Zixuan stops Jiang Yanli from going to the Burial Mound to search for Wei Wuxian as he finally starts to love her deeply. In the end, Jiang Cheng goes to the Burial Mound alone. While the other cultivators speak ill of Wei Wuxian, Jiang Cheng discovers that the latter is only helping the old and weak by growing crops and building houses. However, Wei Wuxian's decision to reawaken Wen Ning's consciousness causes the two to argue again.
28	"Episode 28"	Cheng Wai Man, Chen Jia Lin	Yang Xia	24 July 2019	22 July 2019
Jiang Cheng tries to convince Wei Wuxian to hand over the Qishan Wen remnants and Stygian Tiger Seal. However, Wei Wuxian declines as he is determined to save these people and Wen Ning. He asks to be disowned from the Yunmeng Jiang sect so that his family's reputation will not be damaged, and the brothers stage a fight. Before Jiang Cheng leaves, Wen Qing returns the comb to him. Jiang Cheng announces that Wei Wuxian has officially become a rebel. At the same time, Jiang Yanli dreams that Wei Wuxian is not returning home. When she exits her room, she finds Jin Zixuan planting lotus flowers in the garden to help recreate the Lotus Pier for her. In Yiling, Lan Wangji enjoys tea while a storyteller and a group of listeners speak ill of Wei Wuxian. Angered, he leaves the tea-house and meets Wen Yuan who hugs his leg. He gets flustered as Wen Yuan starts crying and onlookers crowd around. They assume Lan Wangji is Wen Yuan's father. Wei Wuxian finds them and jokes that he gave birth to Wen Yuan. Lan Wangji buys toys for Wen Yuan and Wei Wuxian offers that they enjoy a meal together to reminisce about the old days.
29	"Episode 29"	Cheng Wai Man, Chen Jia Lin	Yang Xia	29 July 2019	23 July 2019
While Wei Wuxian and Lan Wangji enjoy a meal together, the latter breaks the news of Jiang Yanli's marriage with Jin Zixuan. Wei Wuxian then laments that he can never witness the wedding despite having promised to give her an extravagant one. While eating, something bad is happening back in the Burial Mound and the two rush back with Wen Yuan. It turns out that Wen Ning is going out of control and has started attacking. With the efforts of Lan Wangji's guqin and Wei Wuxian's talismans, they successfully stop Wen Ning and even awaken his consciousness. Wei Wuxian then brings Lan Wangji to show him around his cave. There, Lan Wangji worries that Wei Wuxian might lose control, but the latter is determined that he will never do so. When Wei Wuxian sends Lan Wangji off, he tells that he can never abandon this path as he wants to protect the innocent Qishan Wen Sect survivors. Back inside, the Qishan Wen remnants throw a surprise dinner for Wei Wuxian to show their appreciation. Wei Wuxian then gets drunk on their homemade wine, he remembers his first encounter with Lan Wangji and despairs over how useless he is to Jiang Yanli. In the Cloud Recesses, Lan Wangji is punished to kneel outside in the cold while lifting sticks. Wei Wuxian's creation of many spiritual devices leads many folks to dress as his disciple to sell imitation goods, especially talismans.
30	"Episode 30"	Cheng Wai Man, Chen Jia Lin	Yang Xia	29 July 2019	23 July 2019
While Wei Wuxian and Wen Ning are out to sell radishes, they meet Jiang Cheng on the street. With Wen Ning waiting outside, the two enters an isolated residence to reunite with Jiang Yanli. She has come to see Wei Wuxian while wearing her bridal gown, as he cannot attend the wedding. The Yunmeng Jiang siblings then sit down together and Jiang Yanli give Wei Wuxian the chance to name her unborn son. Wei Wuxian then decide on "Jin Rulan". The three then enjoy lotus soup and Jiang Yanli also offers Wen Ning a bowl out of kindness. Wei Wuxian then parts with them and Wen Ning brings the bowl of soup back to Wen Yuan. Back in the Burial Mound, Wei Wuxian reminisces about his time with his loved ones. The next day, Wei Wuxian starts growing lotus as he desires so. Half a month later, preparations are ongoing in the Carp Tower for the wedding. The lotus crops are not doing well and Wen Yuan's playfulness causes him to pull out the only seedling. Wei Wuxian gets angry but Wen Yuan's innocence melts his anger away easily. Finally, Wei Wuxian's crops all sprouted successfully. A year later, news of Jin Rulan's birth spread to Yiling and Wei Wuxian learns of it. In the Carp Tower, the Lanling Jin sect along with Lan Wangji and Lan Xichen discuss about whether Wei Wuxian should be invited to Jin Rulan's one-month anniversary. Jin Guangyao suggests to invite Wei Wuxian, but also to have him hand over the Stygian Tiger Seal and surrender. With agreement from the others in the room, his invitation is then handed to Lan Wangji to handle.
31	"Episode 31"	Cheng Wai Man, Chen Jia Lin	Yang Xia	30 July 2019	24 July 2019
The invitation to Jin Rulan's one-month anniversary arrives and Wei Wuxian is excited to attend. Wei Wuxian then buys a tassel to gift Jin Rulan, along with a bracelet that he made to repel low-level evil beings. Wei Wuxian and Wen Ning then pass by Qiongqi Path to reach the Carp Tower, but are stopped by Jin Zixun. The latter blames Wei Wuxian for cursing him with "A Hundred Boils and a Hundred Holes Curse". As Jin Zixun refuses to back down, he attacks and Wei Wuxian controls Wen Ning to counter them. During the fight, Jin Ling's gift gets into Jin Zixun's hands. At Carp Tower, Jin Guangyao tells Jin Zixuan about Jin Zixun secretly attacking Wei Wuxian. Jin Zixuan then arrives at Qiongqi Path to stop them. But Jin Zixun constantly insults Wei Wuxian and crushes Jin Rulan's gift into dust. This angers Wei Wuxian and he starts attacking by controlling Wen Ning with his flute. However, Wei Wuxian loses control over Wen Ning who then kills Jin Zixuan and chokes Jin Zixun to death. This news reach the others in the Carp Tower where everyone are waiting for them to return and Jiang Yanli falls into despair. In the Burial Mound, Wei Wuxian wakes up in rage and blames Wen Ning for killing Jin Zixuan. However, he then doubts himself and his choices made during the past year. Wen Qing then forces Wei Wuxian to stay in bed while the Wen siblings declare that they will turn themselves in. Although Wei Wuxian actively rejects, Wen Qing stabs him with needle and says her final goodbye and thanks before leading the Qishan Wen remnants to the Carp Tower for their long-awaited execution.
32	"Episode 32"	Cheng Wai Man, Chen Jia Lin	Yang Xia	30 July 2019	24 July 2019
After breaking the effects of Wen Qing's needle, Wei Wuxian comes to the Carp Tower to visit Jiang Yanli but runs away when the Lanling Jin sect disciples chase after him. He arrives in a forest and the resentful energy overpowers him. In rage and anguish, he then goes to the Nightless City where all the prestigious sects are holding a ceremony. When he overhears the smaller cultivators talking about him, he attacks them and barges in. Inside, the sect leaders pour out wine to respect the fallen heroes, and Jin Guangshan destroys the box filled with the Wen siblings' ashes. When Jin Guangshan declares that they will reduce Wei Wuxian to ashes, the said man reveals himself on the roof. The other sect leaders and disciples continuously criticise him even though he tries to explain how unfairly he has been treated. When a disciple shoots him with an arrow, Wei Wuxian takes that as the last straw and starts to attack by playing his flute. Lan Wangji arrives to stop him and tries to get him to believe in him. But he is interrupted when Jiang Yanli appears on the battlefield suddenly. Jiang Cheng, Wei Wuxian, and Jiang Yanli try to find each other. Wei Wuxian then realizes that he has lost control over his fierce corpses as someone else is also playing a flute. When Jiang Yanli finally spots Wei Wuxian, a fierce corpse, controlled by that mysterious man playing a flute, slashes her back. Seeing this, Jiang Cheng and Wei Wuxian rushes to her. As Jiang Yanli lies in Jiang Cheng's embrace, she tries to talk to Wei Wuxian and still treats him as her younger brother. However, a disciple trying to ambush Wei Wuxian accidentally stabs her, causing her death. Furious, Wei Wuxian chokes him to death.
33	"Episode 33"	Cheng Wai Man, Chen Jia Lin	Yang Xia	31 July 2019	29 July 2019
As everyone chants to kill Wei Wuxian, he loses control again and plays his flute. But the internal injuries from too much resentful energy only encourages everyone to continue trying to kill him. When they want to snatch the Stygian Tiger Seal, Wei Wuxian breaks it apart and scatters the pieces into the crowd. While everyone competes for power, Wei Wuxian goes to the edge of the cliff and Lan Wangji follows. Wei Wuxian tries to fall but Lan Wangji catches him in time, unwillingly to let go. Jiang Cheng then come to vent his anger at Wei Wuxian but decide against killing him. However, Wei Wuxian shrugs himself off Lan Wangji's grip and falls to his death. 16 years later, Wei Wuxian awakes in Lan Wangji's room. The next day, he goes around the Cloud Recesses to reminisce about his past. He then spots Lan Wangji healing in the Cold Spring and notices whip scars on his back and a scar of Qishan Wen sect's iron stamp on his chest. Curious, he asks Lan Wangji about it as he is a star pupil, but the latter keeps silent. The disciples then come over to report that the spiritual sword from the Mo Village has gone out of control. Lan Wangji and Wei Wuxian then goes inside to use their music to soothe the sword. They then decide to investigate the sword further and arrives at Qinghe. In the town, Wei Wuxian meets a merchant selling portraits of the Yiling Patriarch. While he argues with the merchant about the ugliness, Jin Ling arrives in rage as Wei Wuxian's name is mentioned. Jin Ling and Wei Wuxian then quarrel again. After Jin Ling calls his dog Fairy over, Wei Wuxian runs away in fright.
34	"Episode 34"	Cheng Wai Man, Chen Jia Lin	Yang Xia	31 July 2019	29 July 2019
After Wei Wuxian meets a dead end while running away from Fairy, he calls out for Lan Wangji's help. The latter arrives to stop Jin Ling from teasing him further and Jin Ling leaves with his dog. Wei Wuxian then asks the merchant about any strange incidents and learns the existence of a Xinglu Ridge that eats souls. When he then asks why the Qinghe Nie Sect has done nothing to stop this, the merchant says that the current sect leader Nie Huaisang is a "head-shaker" and is incapable of doing anything. Wei Wuxian and Lan Wangji then goes to find the Xinglu Ridge. There, they keep hearing Fairy's barking but Jin Ling is not in sight. They then see a tomb and enters it through a broken hole. Wei Wuxian is bothered by the spiritual energy inside. Wei Wuxian then uses the Compass of Evil to find Jin Ling. When they arrive at the coffin area, they are surprised to find that only swords are inside the coffins. Lan Wangji then uses Inquiry to ask for Jin Ling's whereabouts. They successfully retrieve him from inside the wall. Then, they hear Fairy barking again which confirms that someone is keeping an eye on them. When they go outside, Lan Wangji see someone running and they decide to split up. Lan Wangji goes to chase after the mysterious person while Wei Wuxian brings Jin Ling to rest in an inn. While Jin Ling is unconscious, Wei Wuxian discovers a curse mark on the former's leg. However, when Jin Ling wakes, he runs away and Wei Wuxian gets caught by Jiang Cheng while chasing for him. Wei Wuxian's identity is finally revealed to Jiang Cheng, and the two have another heated argument about the past. Jin Ling then lies to Jiang Cheng to free Wei Wuxian and justifies that it's because he doesn't believe Wei Wuxian is the real deal. Wei Wuxian then knocks Jin Ling out to absorb the curse marks from Jin Ling onto himself.
35	"Episode 35"	Cheng Wai Man, Chen Jia Lin	Yang Xia	5 August 2019	30 July 2019
With the curse marks gone from Jin Ling, after he wakes up, Wei Wuxian lies about Lan Wangji's arrival in order to chase him away. Wei Wuxian then meets up with Lan Wangji, who is concerned about the curse marks on Wei Wuxian. Though Wei Wuxian assures that he's fine, Lan Wangji piggy-backs him to the inn, where he holds the alleged culprit. The mysterious person is Nie Huaisang, and Wei Wuxian, under his Mo Xuanyu disguise, starts questioning him. They learn that the human-eating tomb is just a fabricated rumor to discourage people to wander into the area, and the ruckus is caused by the bloodthirsty swords left behind by the deceased Qinghe Nie Sect ancestors. After Nie Huaisang leaves, the sword's spirit starts going wild. Lan Wangji and Wei Wuxian play their instruments to calm it down. After, they decide to visit the tomb again, guessing that the spirit is trying to show them something there. Though they are not able to find much, they suspect that Nie Mingjue's sword Baxia is causing all the trouble and set off again. They arrive in Yueyang and Wei Wuxian suspects that the person behind the mysterious sword in Mo Village is not the one behind Nie Mingjue's death. As night begins to fall, they enter the same inn from 16 years ago and overhears a group of men talking about the extermination of the Yueyang Chang Sect. Once they get onto Xiao Xingchen and Song Lan, Lan Wangji explains to Wei Wuxian that they have gone missing over the years. However, the last news was Xiao Xingchen being blamed for the death of Sect Leader Chang Ping. Xue Yang, on the other hand, became a guest disciple in Lanling Jin Sect but was kicked out by Jin Guangyao. Whether he died or not is still unclear. When Wei Wuxian pities on Xiao Xingchen and Song Lan's fate, Lan Wangji gets equally emotional and drinks a cup of wine that Wei Wuxian has poured for himself.
36	"Episode 36"	Cheng Wai Man, Chen Jia Lin	Yang Xia	5 August 2019	30 July 2019
Wei Wuxian brings drunk Lan Wangji to their room and goes out to look for Wen Ning. When he realizes that Wen Ning's consciousness is sealed, he discovers two black nails in his head and pulls them out. Finally, Wen Ning wakes up and explains that he does not remember what happened after he and Wen Qing were captured. However, he recalls being locked up in somewhere dark before being summoned by Wei Wuxian's flute. When Wei Wuxian decides to use Lan Wangji's BiChen to cut off the chains on Wen Ning, Lan Wangji arrives in his drunk state. Wei Wuxian gets Wen Ning to hide while he brings Lan Wangji back to the inn. However, he loses his way and they end up outside a small farm. Lan Wangji breaks in and gifts two chickens to Wei Wuxian, much to the latter's confusion. Lan Wangji also carves his name on the pillar, and Wei Wuxian adds his own name. When the two return to the inn, a masked person attacks and tries to steal the Qiankun Pouch. Lan Wangji fights him but the masked man uses a teleportation talisman to escape. The two then sit down to rest and Wei Wuxian starts teasing Lan Wangji with questions which the latter answers. The next morning, they set off east and ends up in Yi City. As they are enveloped in mist, they see someone run beside them. Lan Wangji follows the person while Wei Wuxian bumps into the disciples of different sects who are night-hunting together who got lost while following the bamboo knocking sound. With Lan Wangji gone after the mysterious person, a group of fierce corpses attacks Wei Wuxian and the disciples. Wei Wuxian tries to control them but fails. They are then saved by Lan Wangji. This confirms that someone has recreated the Stygian Tiger Seal but just the half piece which isn't as powerful as the one Wei Wuxian invented. The masked man then appears again and Lan Wangji gives chase. After some of the disciples are poisoned by the powder mixed in the fog, Wei Wuxian instructs them and they find an occupied residence to enter. The residence is filled with creepy paper dolls and the old granny is also abnormal, but Wei Wuxian assures that they just have to behave. To start curing the poisoned disciples, he calls for a volunteer to help him.
37	"Episode 37"	Cheng Wai Man, Chen Jia Lin	Yang Xia	6 August 2019	31 July 2019
With the help of Lan Sizhui and Jin Ling, Wei Wuxian prepares porridge for the poisoned disciples. However, as the disciples drink the porridge, they complain about the heavy spice. Just then, they hear the bamboo knocking sound again and Wei Wuxian peeks out to investigate. He then tests the other disciples to observe the blind girl outside. While they discover that the blind girl is also mute, she runs away and a mysterious figure comes up to their front door with injuries. Wei Wuxian recognises him as Xiao Xingchen and brings him inside. However, many puppets suddenly appear and Wei Wuxian uses a spell to shut the door. Song Lan breaks in from the rooftop and starts attacking Wei Wuxian. The latter plays his flute to bind him and finds the same kind of black nail in his head. He then instructs someone to play Inquiry, which Lan Sizhui is able to do. They ask Song Lan three questions, and the last answer causes Xiao Xingchen to control Song Lan and attack Wei Wuxian again. Xiao Xingchen tells everyone else to leave and Wei Wuxian asks Lan Sizhui to lead the disciples. After the two are alone, Xiao Xingchen forces Wei Wuxian to help him restore a soul, even though the latter is unable to. Wei Wuxian then exposes his real identity and Xue Yang finally removes his Xiao Xingchen disguise. The two get outside to see Wen Ning and Song Lan fight and Xue Yang wants to take Wei Wuxian away. Lan Wangji then arrives in time to save the latter and starts fighting Xue Yang. Wei Wuxian then decides to take the disciples to find the blind girl. They arrive at a coffin house and find the real Xiao Xingchen's body.
38	"Episode 38"	Cheng Wai Man, Chen Jia Lin	Yang Xia	6 August 2019	31 July 2019
Wei Wuxian decides to use "Empathy" to see the blind girl A-Qing's memories and a flashback from 10 years ago starts. A-Qing fakes blindness to get free food and steal money, and later bumps into a blind Xiao Xingchen to do the same. However, he is quick-witted and asks for his money pouch back. A man she stole from earlier comes back for his money too. When he is about to hit A-Qing, Xiao Xingchen saves her and gets her to return the money. After the man leaves, A-Qing insists on following Xiao Xingchen and the two set off together. On the way, they discover a heavily injured man on the roadside and bring him into a coffin house in Yi City. The man, unknown to them to be Xue Yang, acts as if he does not know Xiao Xingchen and allows himself to be taken care of. The next day, Xue Yang uses candies to test if A-Qing is really blind, and believes so when A-Qing does not react to the sword at her chest. When Xiao Xingchen comes back from hunting, A-Qing tries to warn him of Xue Yang's suspicious actions. But Xiao Xingchen is too kind-hearted and also welcomes Xue Yang's help to repair the hut. When Xue Yang follows him to night-hunt, he secretly poisons innocents and cuts off their tongues to trick Xiao Xingchen's evil-sensing sword, letting the latter kill them. The three live together for 3 years, until Song Lan meets A-Qing while on his search for Xiao Xingchen. When A-Qing brings Song Lan to find him, they meet Xue Yang entering the house. Song Lan goes to fight Xue Yang but is poisoned. Xue Yang cuts off his tongue and Xiao Xingchen appears to finish him off. Song Lan tries to let Xiao Xingchen touch the carving on his sword but fails and Xue Yang leaves him to die. The disciples then wake Wei Wuxian up from the memories and he goes off to try and kill Xue Yang with Lan Wangji.
39	"Episode 39"	Cheng Wai Man, Chen Jia Lin	Yang Xia	7 August 2019	5 August 2019
Wei Wuxian confronts Xue Yang about his past but Xue Yang takes advantage of the fog to confuse them about his whereabouts. When A-Qing uses her bamboo stick to point out where Xue Yang is, he stabs her and Lan Wangji's sword does the same to him. Xue Yang's arm gets sliced off and the masked man appears again to take the half Stygian Tiger Seal from him before disappearing. The fight ends and the disciples catch up with them. Wei Wuxian leaves Song Lan and Xue Yang to finish their business while he and the others bury A-Qing outside Yi City. As Song Lan lands the final blow on Xue Yang, the latter recalls when Xiao Xingchen finds out about his identity. While the two face each other, Xiao Xingchen learns more and more about all the lies Xue Yang had told him, and finally commits suicide after learning Song Lan was killed by his own hands. Desperate, Xue Yang tries to revive him that night but fails, screaming his name in agony. As Xue Yang lies on the ground dying, he stares at the last candy that Xiao Xingchen had given him. Outside, the spirit pouch reacts again and Wei Wuxian and Lan Wangji return to Yi City to find answers. They meet Song Lan by Xiao Xingchen's coffin and hand over Xiao Xingchen's soul and sword before parting ways. Then, they find Nie Mingjue's body below one of the coffins. At night in Tan Zhou, the disciples walk around the night market and a toy paper butterfly reminds Lan Sizhui of his childhood. On the other hand, Wei Wuxian misses A-Yuan, and buys a paper rabbit lantern with Lan Wangji. Later, the disciples wait at an inn while Wei Wuxian and Lan Wangji meet with Lan Xichen to discuss about Nie Mingjue. Not long after, the disciples inside start to argue loudly about Wei Wuxian. When Lan Wangji goes inside the inn, Lan Xichen identifies Wei Wuxian disguised as Mo Xuanyu.
40	"Episode 40"	Cheng Wai Man, Chen Jia Lin	Yang Xia	7 August 2019	5 August 2019
As the disciples continue to argue, seeing Lan Wangji ordering wine makes them scurry back to their seats. Seeing Lan Wangji with wine shocks Lan Sizhui and Lan Jingyi. In the room, Wen Ning visits Wei Wuxian but is chased away as Lan Wangji returns. As Lan Wangji suggests for Wei Wuxian to come to the Carp Tower the next month to look for Nie Mingjue's head, Lan Xichen comes into the room too to allow Wei Wuxian to come along. At the Carp Tower, as Jiang Cheng confronts Lan Xichen about his decision to bring Wei Wuxian, Jin Guangyao comes to welcome them. Inside, Wei Wuxian has to be cautious as his Mo Xuanyu identity had been kicked out of the Lanling Jin Sect for causing trouble. Jin Guangyao walks in with his wife, Qin Su, to officiate the three-day banquet. Wei Wuxian finds Lanling Jin Clan giving him weird glances. Later, Lan Wangji and Wei Wuxian part ways for the latter to find clues. He goes to the backyard and meets Jin Ling. However, a group of disciples along with Jin Chan come up and start insults Mo Xuanyu (who is actually Wei Wuxian) for bothering Qin Su which is the reason why Mo Xuanyu was kicked out of the Lanling Jin Sect. After Jin Ling defends Wei Wuxian, the boys start fighting. Seeing that the other disciples outnumber Jin Ling, Wei Wuxian lends a hand by teaching him a few moves. Later in Lan Wangji and Wei Wuxian's room, Wei Wuxian uses his paper man to investigate Jin Guangyao's room. There, he learns that Qin Su has received a letter exposing Jin Guangyao. He overhears an argument between Jin Guangyao and Qin Su. Then, he follows them into the secret treasure room through the copper mirror, where Jin Guangyao locks Qin Su in. Wei Wuxian also discovers Nie Mingjue's head and begins "Empathy".
41	"Episode 41"	Cheng Wai Man, Chen Jia Lin	Yang Xia	12 August 2019	6 August 2019
Nie Mingjue's flashbacks begin with the time when Jin Guangyao was still in the Qinghe Nie sect as Meng Yao. After overhearing the disciples badmouthing him, Meng Yao retreats to eat alone outside, only to be found by Nie Mingjue. As the latter brings him back to the rest of the group, the disciples continue their insults. This angers Nie Mingjue and he appoints Jin Guangyao to be his deputy general. The next flashback is when Jin Guangyao murders the general and lies about his intentions. It is revealed that the general had previously witnessed him speaking with someone in private. The next flashback is when Jin Guangyao and Nie Mingjue fought in Nightless City. This time, Jin Guangyao threatens Nie Mingjue about breaking his sword Baxia to anger him to death, and kills Qinghe Nie sect disciples. Next, Lan Xichen teaches Jin Guangyao to play "Cleansing" on the guqin for Nie Mingjue for calming his mind, but Jin Guangyao secretly changes it a little to worsen Nie Mingjue's condition instead. One night, after Nie Mingjue and Jin Guangyao argue, the former pushes Jin Guangyao down the stairs. Jin Guangyao climbs up again and the already angered Nie Mingjue enters the last stage of Qi deviation. He starts hallucinating many Jin Guangyaos and slashes at the air wildly. Nie Huaisang soon arrives and Jin Guangyao is shown to be using him as a human shield, rather than holding Nie Huaisang back. Lastly, in Jin Guangyao's treasure room, he locks Nie Mingjue up and instructs Xue Yang to behead him. Paperman Wei Wuxian wakes from the memories and avoids Jin Guangyao's attacks, also using his sword SuiBian to tackle him before successfully escaping. As soon as he returns to his body, he and Lan Wangji hurry out to confront Jin Guangyao. They, along with Lan Xichen, tries to enter Jin Guangyao's room but are stopped by Su She and Jin Ling.
42	"Episode 42"	Cheng Wai Man, Chen Jia Lin	Yang Xia	12 August 2019	6 August 2019
Jin Guangyao ultimately lets them into the treasure room and Qin Su is still inside. Wei Wuxian starts by investigating her but she is unresponsive. Then, he finds a dagger where Nie Mingjue's head was and Jin Guangyao explains that it is a spiritual device previously owned by Wen Ruohan and Wen Qing. Suddenly, Qin Su grabs the dagger and stabs herself to death, leaving Jin Guangyao devastated. Jiang Cheng and Nie Huaisang also arrive. Lan Xichen starts explaining the mystery surrounding the sword spirit and Lan Wangji's discoveries. Nie Huaisang faints at the news and Jin Guangyao continues his crying act. He then starts doubting "Mo Xuanyu" and attacks him. Lan Wangji immediately protects him and a fight ensues, causing Wei Wuxian to use SuiBian and reveal his own identity. The two escape but are trapped by the disciples outside. Wei Wuxian tells Lan Wangji to act as if he was also tricked, but Lan Wangji wishes to walk down this path with him. The two counter the disciples and run away. But Jin Ling stabs Wei Wuxian before they manage to escape. On the way, Lan Wangji passes spiritual energy to Wei Wuxian and the latter thinks about how Lan Wangji is the only person who stands by him. Wei Wuxian then wakes up in the Quiet Room at the Cloud Recesses. He and Lan Wangji speculates that Mo Xuanyu might have been kicked out because he found out the truth. Then, Wei Wuxian wonders if his sword is really sealed and Lan Wangji tries pulling it out to prove his point. Lan Xichen also enters the room to discuss the matter at hand. However, while Lan Wangji trusts Wei Wuxian, Lan Xichen also trusts Jin Guangyao. Wei Wuxian plays Jin Guangyao's "Cleansing" as evidence. The Twin Jades realizes that a part is wrong, so Lan Xichen brings them into the Forbidden Library to look for a music sheet used for harm. Wei Wuxian then theorizes that it is possible Jin Guangyao used this harmful music like a slow poison to worsen Nie Mingjue's condition.
43	"Episode 43"	Cheng Wai Man, Chen Jia Lin	Yang Xia	13 August 2019	7 August 2019
Wei Wuxian continues to speculate about Jin Guangyao's schemes but Lan Xichen finds it hard to reconcile with the man he knows. Lan Wangji goes to see Lan Qiren so Lan Xichen brings Wei Wuxian back to the Quiet Room. There, the latter asks about Lan Wangji's scars and Lan Xichen explains. When Wei Wuxian died that year, Lan Wangji disobeyed the Gusu Lan Sect in order to protect Wei Wuxian's cave. As a result, he received severe punishment and was forced into seclusion for three years. Lan Xichen tells him their parents' story and Lan Wangji's stubbornness towards the people he care about. Lan Wangji then returns with Emperor's Smile and lets Wei Wuxian enjoy wine in the room. At the table, they discuss the second flute sound that was heard during both battles at Qiongqi Path and Nightless City. While Lan Wangji determines that it is Jin Guangyao's doing, Wei Wuxian is now indifferent to that truth. Next morning, Lan Wangji and Wei Wuxian eavesdrop on Jin Guangyao's conversation with Lan Xichen. He requests to search for Wei Wuxian and Lan Wangji in the Cloud Recesses. He also explains that there is a sudden rise of puppets in the Burial Mounds and suspects that Wei Wuxian is causing it. He invites Lan Xichen to attend the meeting at the Carp Tower. After Lan Xichen sends Jin Guangyao off, he instructs Lan Wangji and Wei Wuxian to check things out in the Burial Mound. On the way, Wei Wuxian plays some songs on his flute and asks Lan Wangji for the name of the piece that he had played for him back in Xuanwu Cave. However, Lan Wangji avoids the question and looks for water. The two find a house and search for water, but the family of the house returns and the two immediately hide.
44	"Episode 44"	Cheng Wai Man, Chen Jia Lin	Yang Xia	13 August 2019	7 August 2019
The family turns out to be Mianmian's. She, Wei Wuxian, and Lan Wangji have a short conversation before trouble arises elsewhere. The pair rushes to see but it turns out to be Wen Ning who has been following them all these while. The three then continue their journey into Yiling. In town, Wei Wuxian reminisces about the time when he, Lan Wangji, and A-Yuan had a meal together. Finally, they arrive in the Burial Mound but everything had been destroyed. However, there is no time for remembrance as puppets start to attack from their hiding spots. After they defeat them, Lan Wangji hands SuiBian to Wei Wuxian to defend himself but the latter refuses. Wei Wuxian lies that his new body is weak. Inside the cave, they find junior disciples tied up. After Jin Chan badmouths Wei Wuxian and angers Jin Ling, the two begin to fight and Wei Wuxian has to step in to stop them. To prove that he and Lan Wangji have no malicious intent, he lets Wen Ning use his sword to set them free from the ropes. However, as they are leaving the cave, the other sects swiftly gather outside to claim back their disciples and stand against Wei Wuxian. Lan Wangji disobeys Lan Qiren and continues to stand by Wei Wuxian's side. The sect leaders, especially Su She and Sect Leader Yao, continuously blame Wei Wuxian for the puppets and his past alleged deeds. Suddenly, a second wave of puppets arrive and everyone fights. But the adults' spiritual energy begin to diminish and they are unable to hold out against the puppets. Everyone retreats into the cave but they are still wary of Wei Wuxian. The latter begins to question Su She.
45	"Episode 45"	Cheng Wai Man, Chen Jia Lin	Yang Xia	14 August 2019	7 August 2019
Wei Wuxian continues to expose Su She and the latter has no way to defend himself. Defeated, he uses the teleportation talisman, revealing his identity as the masked man from Yi City. The puppets start to break into the cave. Wen Ning, Lan Sizhui, and Jin Ling go out to fight them. Wei Wuxian then uses himself to lure the puppets away and allow the others to escape. With Lan Wangji at his side, the two and Wen Ning manage to kill all the puppets. While waiting for the boats to set off to Yunmeng, the junior disciples stay on the pier for Lan Sizhui to rest to avoid sea-sickness. OuYang ZiZhen comes over, curious why Gusu-born Lan Sizhui would fall victim to sea-sickness, but Lan Sizhui does not know either. Suddenly, Wen Ning comes up to Lan Sizhui to ask for his name and upbringing as he is reminded of Wen Yuan. Despite OuYang ZiZhen's concern for Lan Sizhui, the latter answers earnestly. Lan Sizhui is also left conflicted when he remembers paper toy butterflies from his childhood. Now convinced Lan Sizhui is his lost relative, Wen Ning raises his hand to touch Lan Sizhui. Jin Ling, who had been watching Wen Ning with suspicion, unsheathes his sword. A small fight breaks out between the disciples, catching everyone's attention. Jin Ling is told to put away his sword but he refuses and cries as the sword once belonged to his father. At the entrance of Lotus Pier, Wen Ning is denied entry and Lan Sizhui opts to keep him company. Inside, Jiang Cheng receives two ladies who wishes to speak with him. He brings them into the main hall so they can share their stories with everyone present. The first lady, Si Si, shares about how Jin Guangyao hired a group of prostitutes to provide their services to Jin Guangshan, resulting in his death. The second lady, Bi Cao, shares that Jin Guangyao and Qin Su are actually siblings, to everyone's great horror.
46	"Episode 46"	Cheng Wai Man, Chen Jia Lin	Yang Xia	14 August 2019	7 August 2019
It is also revealed that the letter that Qin Su received was from Bi Cao. With Jin Guangyao's deeds out in the open, everyone's mindset immediately changes. Following Sect Leader Yao's lead, the people in the room chant for his capture. They also ask Wei Wuxian to settle the Stygian Tiger Seal and praise his skills. But Wei Wuxian and Lan Wangji leave the hall. While walking, they discuss who might be the person helping them behind-the-scenes. Wei Wuxian catches sight of the Yunmeng Jiang Sect's altar and the two enter to pay their respects. However, Jiang Cheng finds them and starts insulting him and Lan Wangji. Wei Wuxian gets agitated and leaves with Lan Wangji, but Jiang Cheng chases after them and initiates another fight. However, blood trickles from Wei Wuxian's nose and he grows weaker. Lan Wangji tries to bring him away again but Jiang Cheng attacks. Wei Wuxian passes out and Wen Ning suddenly appears to block Jiang Cheng's oncoming attack. He repeatedly tries to get Jiang Cheng to pull SuiBian from its scabbard despite the latter whipping him. Jiang Cheng finally stops and pulls the sword out, utterly shocked to know that he is able to do so despite the seal. Wen Ning then explains that golden core inside him is Wei Wuxian's and was transferred by Wen Qing on that mountain years ago. Jiang Cheng weeps and vehemently attempts to deny the story. Lan Wangji sheds a tear and angrily takes Wei Wuxian away. Wei Wuxian lies against Lan Wangji on the boat and Wen Ning asks for this to not reach Wei Wuxian's ears. Lan Wangji promises and Wen Ning thanks him for previously standing up for him and taking care of Wen Yuan. When Wei Wuxian finally wakes up, he tells Lan Wangji not to take Jiang Cheng's words to heart. They enjoy some fresh lotus seeds. Later, a Lanling Jin Sect messenger butterfly shows up with news that Jin Guangyao is in Yunmeng. Wei Wuxian recalls seeing a land deed of a city called Yunping Cheng and three continue their search for the truth.
47	"Episode 47"	Cheng Wai Man, Chen Jia Lin	Yang Xia	19 August 2019	7 August 2019
Lan Wangji and Wei Wuxian discover a temple with something hidden underneath. They decide to investigate at night when no one will be around. At night, they go to the temple but the front door is sealed. Wei Wuxian then instructs Wen Ning to keep watch outside while he and Lan Wangji try to enter from the back. However, Wen Ning sees ominous black clouds and rushes to look. Jin Ling appears, chasing after Fairy. Lan Wangji and Wei Wuxian climb onto the roof and finds Lan Xichen among the Lanling Jin Sect disciples inside. Fairy leads Jin Ling to the entrance and the latter knocks on the door out of curiosity. However, the disciples point their arrows at him. Seeing that no one is opening the door, Jin Ling resorts to climbing over the roof but the disciples start firing at him. Wei Wuxian protects him by throwing his bamboo flute to obstruct the arrows and engages in a fight alongside Lan Wangji, but his bamboo flute gets destroyed. Jin Guangyao appears and takes Wei Wuxian hostage with a garrote. Jin Ling also gets caught and brought in while Fairy has escaped. Jin Guangyao forces Lan Wangji to sheathe his sword and block out his spiritual core. Suddenly, it starts to rain heavily and they are brought inside the temple. Su She appears with an unconscious Nie Huaisang who passed out from fright after Su She tried to capture him. Wei Wuxian and Su She quarrel again and Su She tries to attack him in anger. Lan Wangji protects him and Wei Wuxian continues to irritate Su She. Suddenly, Jiang Cheng arrives in the temple and Jin Guangyao attacks him. Jin Guangyao catches Jiang Cheng off guard by bringing up his troubled relationship with Wei Wuxian. As a result, Jiang Cheng suffers injuries and the fight ends when the disciples finally find what they are digging for. Wei Wuxian then asks Lan Wangji about what happened the other night and the latter explains that Wen Ning had told Jiang Cheng about the golden core.
48	"Episode 48"	Cheng Wai Man, Chen Jia Lin	Yang Xia	19 August 2019	7 August 2019
A heartbroken Jiang Cheng confronts Wei Wuxian about his inferiority to him. He blames Wei Wuxian for all the deaths and for going against his promise. Jiang Cheng then breaks down crying and Wei Wuxian apologizes. Jiang Cheng also apologizes and the two finally reconcile, putting the past behind them. Nie Huaisang wakes up as something terrible happens at the digging site. Jin Guangyao and Su She come out with injury. They return and the rest follow to discover a coffin. Inside the coffin is the body of Nie Mingjue. Lan Xichen grows wary of Jin Guangyao's motive and Wei Wuxian teases the latter that the real culprit behind this might not be a person. When Su She is attending to his own wounds, they discover that he has the rebound curse of the "A Hundred boils and a Hundred Holes", and the real truth behind Jin Zixun's death is finally revealed. All of Jin Guangyao's deeds are just for him to climb higher up the social ladder and Su She also blames all of them for making him feel inferior. Wei Wuxian laughs about how he did all these bad things for this reason. Jin Guangyao belittles Wei Wuxian, and Jiang Cheng calls Jin Guangyao the son of a prostitute. This causes Jin Guangyao to flare up and blame Jiang Cheng for contributing to Wei Wuxian's misfortune. When he and Su She are about to leave, Wei Wuxian asks about how Nie Mingjue died and scares him with the thought of Nie Mingjue haunting him. He whistles to control the Stygian Tiger Seal and gives Jin Guangyao hallucinations of the people he once killed. Lan Xichen regains his spiritual power and holds his blade to Jin Guangyao's neck. Wei Wuxian exposes how Jin Guangyao worked with Xue Yang to use the Stygian Tiger Seal. When Lan Xichen expresses how he can no longer trust him, Jin Guangyao kneels and asks for his forgiveness.
49	"Episode 49"	Cheng Wai Man, Chen Jia Lin	Yang Xia	20 August 2019	7 August 2019
Jin Guangyao begs for Lan Xichen's forgiveness but Lan Xichen refuses. Jin Guangyao then explains that he received a blackmail letter that vowed to expose his schemes and kill him. But Lan Xichen does not allow this as an excuse. He then asks Jin Guangyao a series of questions, the first being why Jin Guangyao married Qin Su even though they are siblings. Jin Guangyao explains that he did not have a choice as he loved her. When he also explains why he killed Jin Guangshan, Lan Xichen slaps him. He then asks if Jin Zixuan's death is also his doing. Jin Guangyao admits that he and Su She played music on that day to manipulate Wen Ning to kill Jin Zixuan. Jin Ling breaks down at that but Jin Guangyao blames it all on how Jin Guangshan has treated him before. He continues to share how his own father would disregard him at every turn but it is too late for Jin Guangyao to redeem himself. Jin Guangyao takes Jin Ling hostage like he did to Wei Wuxian. Suddenly, Lan Sizhui gets kicked into the temple while trying to stop Wen Ning. Wen Ning, possessed by Nie Mingjue's sword Baxia, tries to kill Jin Guangyao. As Jin Guangyao dodges, Lan Wangji slices off his left arm. Wen Ning continues to attack him and Lan Wangji and Lan Xichen plays their instruments to stop Wen Ning. The sword then aims for Jin Ling who has Jin Guangyao's blood on his clothes and Wen Ning tries his hardest to stop the sword. While Jin Ling and Jiang Cheng escape, Jiang Cheng hands Wei Wuxian his flute Chen Qing. Wei Wuxian then uses the Stygian Tiger Seal to control Baxia and lead it into Nie Mingjue's coffin. However, as Wei Wuxian is about to seal the sword inside, Nie Huaisang screams and everyone goes out to see. Nie Huaisang's leg is bleeding and he cries out that Su She attacked him. Baxia suddenly flies straight at Su She and stabs him to death. Wei Wuxian controls Baxia again and successfully locks up both the sword and Stygian Tiger Seal with Nie Mingjue's corpse. Later, Lan Xichen attends to Nie Huaisang's wounds and moves on to Jin Guangyao. When Lan Xichen asks Nie Huaisang for the medicine, he hides it and shouts that Jin Guangyao is reaching behind his back. Lan Xichen immediately turns around and stabs Jin Guangyao.
50	"Episode 50"	Cheng Wai Man, Chen Jia Lin	Yang Xia	20 August 2019	7 August 2019
Jin Guangyao is in disbelief that Nie Huaisang has been hiding and plotting his schemes all these years. However, Nie Huaisang continues to deny it. Jin Guangyao then pushes the sword in deeper and cries that he has never once wanted to harm Lan Xichen. Jin Guangyao suddenly drags him towards the coffin and let his blood spill onto the Stygian Tiger Seal. This triggers the temple to collapse and the others hurry to escape. Jin Guangyao pushes Lan Xichen away and Lan Wangji brings him outside as he watches the debris falling around Jin Guangyao. Lan Xichen and Nie Huaisang sit outside the entrance as Lan Xichen feels depressed about Jin Guangyao and also doubts Nie Huaisang. On the other hand, the last mark on Wei Wuxian's arm from Mo Xuanyu's ritual has disappeared, indicating that Wei Wuxian has finally avenged him. The other disciples and Lan Qiren finally arrive to aid them. When Jin Ling returns from taking Fairy out, Wei Wuxian is nowhere to be found. After asking Lan Jingyi, Jin Ling goes to look for him but Jiang Cheng stops him. Jiang Cheng then begins to leave but Jin Ling knows that he has something to tell Wei Wuxian too. This leads Jiang Cheng to recall the time when Wei Wuxian was on the brink of being captured by the Qishan Wen Sect. It turns out that Jiang Cheng ended up in their hands because he acted as a lure to distract them. Wei Wuxian and Lan Wangji are out in the forest, and Wen Ning and Lan Sizhui catch up with them. Lan Sizhui then begins to recite his childhood memories to prove to Wei Wuxian that he is Wen Yuan. The two finally reunite after so many years; Lan Sizhui breaks into tears and hugs him. Later, Wen Ning tells Wei Wuxian that he and Lan Sizhui will visit Qishan. When Wei Wuxian offers to come along, Wen Ning refuses, wishing to walk his own path and make his own decisions from then on. The four then part ways and Wei Wuxian starts to wonder where they will go next. But Lan Wangji does not move. After, they meet Nie Huaisang outside the Cloud Recesses and Wei Wuxian indirectly tells him not to associate himself with evil people. When Nie Huaisang leaves, Lan Wangji asks Wei Wuxian why he did not ask him about the truth. But that is of no use anymore. On the mountains, the two part ways. When Wei Wuxian is playing on his flute, he hears Lan Wangji calling his name at the end of the song. He then slowly turns around and smiles.

== See also ==
- Mo Dao Zu Shi
