= Liu Haikuan =

Chinese actor

- Born: 3 August 1994 (age 32); Changchun, Jilin, China
- Education: Beijing Film Academy
- Occupation: Actor
- Years active: 2016–present

Liu Haikuan (Chinese: 刘海宽; pinyin: Liú Hǎi Kuān) was born on 3 August 1994 in Jilin Province, China. He is a Chinese actor and made his on-screen debut in the 2016 drama Gamer's Generation. His more recent roles include that of Lan Xichen in the 2019 xianxia drama The Untamed.

== Selected filmography ==
=== Television series ===
Year	English title	Chinese title	Role	Note
2016	Gamer's Generation	电竞纪元	Qin Xiaotian	
2017	My Celestial College	我的仙界学院	Chi Yin	
2017	Rule the World	独步天下	Aisin Gioro Jirgalang	
2018	Dr. Qin Medical Examiner	法医秦明之幸存者	Lin Tao	
2018	Shall We Fall In Love	勇往直前恋上你	Zhou Huaming	
2019	The Untamed	陈情令	Lan Xichen	
2020	Mr. Honesty	不說謊戀人	Li Zhe	
2021	1 Vs 100 Dream Boys	做梦吧！晶晶		
2021	The Long Ballad	长歌行	Situ Langlang	
2021	I Am the Years You Are the Stars	我的百岁恋人	Jiang Baiju	Main Role
2022	Farewell to Arms	烽烟尽处	Peng Xuewen	
2022	Mirror: A Tale of Twin Cities	镜·双城	Yun Huan	
TBA	Yakuza: Like a Dragon	人中之龙	Goro Mashima	

== Awards ==
Year	Award	Category	Nominated work	Result	Ref.
2019	Tencent Video TV And Movie Award	Best Newcomer Award	The Untamed	Won	
