= The Untamed (TV series) =

2019 Chinese television series

- Promotional poster
- 陈情令 (Chén Qíng Lìng)
- Genre: Xianxia
- Based on: Mo Dao Zu Shi by Mo Xiang Tong Xiu
- Written by: Yang Xia; Deng Yaoyu; Ma Jing; Guo Guangyun
- Directed by: Zheng Weiwen; Chen Jialin
- Starring: Xiao Zhan; Wang Yibo
- Ending theme: "Unrestrained" by Xiao Zhan and Wang Yibo
- Composer: Lin Hai
- Country of origin: China
- Original language: Standard Chinese
- No. of seasons: 1
- No. of episodes: 50 (list of episodes)

Production
- Executive producers: Sun Huaizhong; Wang Xin Han Zhijie
- Producers: Fang Fang; Yang Xia; Zhang Meng; Wang Chu; Ren Qiang; Liu Mingtie; Wang Wanning
- Production locations: Hengdian World Studios; Guizhou
- Camera setup: Multi-camera
- Running time: 45 minutes per episode
- Production companies: Tencent Penguin Pictures; NSMG (NewStyle Media Group)

Original release
- Network: Tencent Video
- Release: June 27 – August 20, 2019

Related
- Mo Dao Zu Shi (donghua)

The Untamed (Chinese: 陈情令; pinyin: Chén Qíng Lìng) is a 2019 Chinese television series starring Xiao Zhan and Wang Yibo. Based on the danmei novel Mo Dao Zu Shi by Mo Xiang Tong Xiu, the series follows the adventures of two soulmate cultivators who travel to solve a series of mysteries that link to a tragic event in the past. It aired in China on Tencent Video from June to August 2019. A 20-episode special edition aired on WeTV on December 25, 2019. NewStyle Media Group (NSMG) owns the intellectual property of the series.

The Untamed was a critical and commercial success, both locally and internationally, with critics praising its strong plot, well-rounded characters, and elaborate clothing and makeup. The show was one of the highest-earning dramas of 2019.

According to Research Report on China's Internet Audiovisual Development for 2019 and the beginning of 2020, The Untamed ranked first in terms of popularity index. Due to the series' success, two spin-off movies focusing on supporting characters were released in 2019: Fatal Journey and The Living Dead. The series passed 9.5 billion views on Tencent Video in June 2021, a few days before the second anniversary of its airing date, making it one of the highest-viewed Chinese dramas on the platform. A mobile game based on the series was also set to be released by NetEase Games, though the project is assumed to have been canceled due to legal disagreements.

== Synopsis ==
Wei Wuxian, a loathed cultivator of "dark and demonic arts", is resurrected sixteen years after his tragic death. His return to the world brings him to reunite with the people in his first life, including his soulmate, the honoured Lan Wangji. Wei Wuxian begins to remember his time before his demise, from his beginning as a young cultivator using traditional tools like the sword and musical instruments, to his very personal methods of using resentful energy of departed beings, with the help of innovative tools of his own creation.

The scheming behind his tragic death is slowly unraveled, along with the mysterious death of other people he knew from his past life.

Sixteen years ago, the spirited and unconventional Wei Wuxian arrived at the Gusu Lan Sect to undergo training, where he encountered Lan Wangji, a reserved and principled man from a noble lineage. Despite their starkly contrasting personalities, the two formed a deep bond through shared adventures and trials. After completing his training, Wei Wuxian returned to his home, but a series of tragic events compelled him to sacrifice his spiritual powers to save his martial brother, Jiang Cheng. Stripped of his strength, Wei Wuxian was cast into the Burial Mounds by Wen Chao of the Qishan Wen Sect. He reemerged three months later, practicing demonic cultivation—a forbidden and feared dark art.

Lan Wangji implored Wei Wuxian to abandon the path of demonic cultivation, but his pleas went unanswered. Wei Wuxian's unorthodox practices caused him to be ostracized and vilified, though Lan Wangji remained steadfast in his efforts to guide him away from darkness. Ultimately, during the fateful battle at Nightless City, Wei Wuxian's actions led to the deaths of many disciples from other sects, including his beloved martial sister, Jiang Yanli. Overcome with grief and despair, Wei Wuxian ended his life by leaping off a cliff, despite Lan Wangji's attempts to save him.

In the present day, Wei Wuxian is resurrected through a ritual performed by Mo Xuanyu, whose body he now inhabits. Despite this new identity, Lan Wangji recognizes him instantly. Together, they embark on a journey to unravel long-buried mysteries, uncovering the truths of their past and the events that shaped their fates.

== Episodes ==
The series aired Thursdays and Fridays (GMT +08:00) with two episodes released. VIP members have early access to two additional episodes. On the first day of its release, six episodes were available to VIP members. On June 30, 2019, their official Weibo website published a new release schedule and shifted the release from Mondays to Wednesdays. The series concluded on August 20, 2019 totaling 50 episodes. During an official fanmeeting event on July 29, 2019, it was announced that VIP members would be able to watch all the episodes starting August 7.

== Cast and characters ==
=== Main ===
Actor	Character	Introduction
Xiao Zhan; Su Yaxin (young)	Wei Wuxian (魏无羡)	Birth name: Wei Ying (魏婴) Also known as the Yiling Patriarch (夷陵老祖), Wei Wuxian is the son of Changse Sanren (a rogue cultivator) and Wei Changze (Jiang Fengmian's friend and servant), who died in a battle when Wei Wuxian was young. He was found by Jiang Fengmian on the streets of Yiling and then was adopted by him. He then became Jiang sect head disciple who later chooses to pursue demonic cultivation. He wields a sword called Suibian (随便; 'Whatever') and a flute called Chenqing (陈情), and is known for his ability to invent new spiritual techniques and inventions such as the Stygian Tiger Amulet (阴虎符). He is kind-hearted, optimistic, mischievous, and loyal, and cares deeply for his friends and family. However, due to his nature as a demonic cultivator, his identity as the Yiling Patriarch turned him into a supposedly psychopathic murderer and a boogeyman figure to many. He regards his twin flame, Lan Wangji, as his soulmate. In the original novel, he and Lan Wangji are lovers.
Xiao Zhan; Su Yaxin (young)	Mo Xuanyu (莫玄羽)	The illegitimate son of Jin Guangshan and ex-disciple of the Jin sect. He sacrificed his body to Wei Wuxian through a ritual in order to fulfill his revenge plans, fueling the plot.
Wang Yibo; Chen Junkai (young)	Lan Wangji (蓝忘机)	Birth name: Lan Zhan (蓝湛). Also known by the title Hanguang Jun (含光君; 'Light-Bearing Lord'), he is the second young master of Lan sect and one of the Twin Jades of Lan. He is the younger brother of Lan Xichen and the second son of Qingheng-Jun (In the original novel, he gets heavily injured when Wen Xu of Qishan Wen Sect burns down The Cloud Recesses and then succumbs to death. However, in the drama, he is already dead) and Madam Lan (dies of an unknown illness when Lan Wangji was six years old). He wields the sword Bichen (避尘) and a guqin called Wangji (忘机). He is cold, strict, distant, and difficult to get along with, but has a good heart and a strong sense of justice. He holds a soft spot for his twin flame, Wei Wuxian, whom he regards as his soulmate. In the original novel, he and Wei Wuxian are lovers.

=== Supporting ===
==== Gusu Lan Sect ====
Actor	Character	Introduction
Liu Haikuan; Shen Yifeng (young)	Lan Xichen (蓝曦臣)	Birth name: Lan Huan (蓝涣). Also known by the title Zewu-Jun (泽芜君; 'Brilliance Overgrowth Lord'), he is the leader and first young master of Lan sect, and one of the Twin Jades of Lan. He is the elder brother of Lan Wangji and the first son of Madam Lan and Qingheng-Jun. He is known as one of the Three Zuns alongside his sworn brothers Jin Guangyao and Nie Mingjue. He wields the sword Shuoyue sword (朔月) and the flute Liebing (裂冰). In contrast to his younger brother, he is a kind, gentle, and trusting person.
Huang Ziteng	Lan Qiren (蓝启仁)	The respected elder of Lan sect. The uncle of Lan Xichen and Lan Wangji. An extremely strict teacher who doesn't get along with Wei Wuxian.
Zheng Fanxing; Jiang Yiting (young)	Lan Sizhui (蓝思追)	Birth name: Previously Wen Yuan (温苑), now Lan Yuan (蓝愿). A disciple of Lan sect. He was found by Wei Wuxian among the remains of the Wen sect and was raised by him, and later brought back to the Lan sect by Lan Wangji, who raised him after Wei Wuxian's death. He is a calm and elegant individual who carries himself intelligently and sensibly, and is very mature for his age. As a child, he was more of a troublemaker. He is close friends with Lan Jingyi, Jin Ling and Ouyang Zizhen.
Guo Cheng	Lan Jingyi (蓝景仪)	A disciple of Lan sect. Compared to the tranquil personalities of most of his fellow Lan sect members, he is short-tempered and impatient, but kind at heart, and known in the fanbase as the "most un-Lan Lan to ever Lan in the history of Lan". He is close friends with Lan Sizhui, Jin Ling and Ouyang Zizhen.
Carman Lee	Lan Yi (蓝翼)	The only female head in the history of Lan sect. She invented the infamous Chord Assassination technique, and was responsible for guarding a piece of the Stygian Iron (阴铁). She was also a best friend of Baoshan Sanren.

==== Lanling Jin Sect ====
Actor	Character	Introduction
Shen Xiaohai	Jin Guangshan (Chinese: 金光善)	The leader of Jin sect. The father of Jin Guangyao, Jin Zixuan and Mo Xuanyu. He is known as a womanizer and has many illegitimate children.
Hu Xiaoting	Madame Jin (Chinese: 金夫人)	The wife of Jin Guangshan and mother of Jin Zixuan.
Zhu Zanjin	Jin Guangyao (Chinese: 金光瑶)	Birth name: Meng Yao (Chinese: 孟瑶). Also known as Lianfang-Zun (Chinese: 敛芳尊), or Hidden Fragrance Master, he is the illegitimate son of Jin Guangshan and became the leader of Jin sect after the latter's death. He is known as one of the Three Zuns alongside his sworn brothers Lan Xichen and Nie Mingjue. He wields the Hensheng (Chinese: 恨生 pinyin: Hènshēng) sword. He worked as a servant of the Nie sect and as a spy in the Wen sect before winning his father's approval to join the Jin sect after the Sunshot Campaign. Due to his identity as a prostitute's son, he feels inferior and is determined to prove himself. He is known for wearing a mask of pleasantry and his smooth demeanor. He greatly admires Lan Xichen, who is the only person who does not look down on him because of his low birth.
Cao Yuchen	Jin Zixuan (Chinese: 金子轩)	The son of Jin Guangshan, Jin Ling's father and Jiang Yanli's husband. He is proud and vain, but also upright and just. He scorns Jiang Yanli at first but grows to care for her and eventually falls in love with her. Wei Wuxian loses control over Wen Ning and then Wen Ning murders him.
Yao Shuhao	Jin Zixun (Chinese: 金子勋)	The cousin of Jin Zixuan. He is arrogant and conceited and holds immense dislike for Wei Wuxian. Wei Wuxian loses control over Wen Ning and then Wen Ning murders him.
Jin Luying	Qin Su (Chinese: 秦愫)	The wife of Jin Guangyao, who she happens to be related to; the daughter of Qin Cangye, leader of the Laoling Qin sect, a subsidiary of Jin sect. Later, Qin Su kills herself after knowing some secrets.
Qi Peixin	Jin Ling (Chinese: 金凌)	Courtesy name: Jin Rulan (Chinese: 金如兰). The sole heir of Jin sect, Jiang Cheng and Wei Wuxian's nephew, and the orphaned son of Jiang Yanli and Jin Zixuan. He wields the Suihua (Chinese: 岁华尊) sword and is also an excellent archer. He has a dog named Fairy who often torments Wei Wuxian as comic relief. He is prideful, somewhat immature, and short-tempered, but can also be kind and loyal if necessary. He is close friends with Lan Sizhui, Lan Jingyi and Ouyang Zizhen.
Wang Yifei	Luo Qingyang (Chinese: 罗青羊)	Also known as Mian Mian (Chinese: 绵绵). A disciple of Jin sect. She is unafraid to speak up for what's right and later left Jin sect due to differing beliefs on Wei Wuxian, being one of the only characters aside from Lan Wangji who is willing to speak up for him.
Liu Yinjun	Jin Chan (Chinese: 金阐)	A disciple of Lanling Jin sect. He bullied Jin Ling, but is stopped by Wei Wuxian.

==== Qinghe Nie Sect ====
Actor	Character	Introduction
Wang Yizhou; Xuan Yuewen (young)	Nie Mingjue (Chinese: 聂明玦)	Also known as Chifeng-Zun or Red Blade Master(Chinese: 赤锋尊), or the Scarlet Peak Master, he is the leader of Nie sect. He is known as one of the Three Zuns alongside his sworn brothers Lan Xichen and Jin Guangyao. He wields the Baxia (Chinese: 霸下) saber. He is strict, just, and known for his intolerance toward evil. However, he has a terrible temper and holds extreme grudges towards Jin Guangyao. Later he was turned into a manipulated puppet by Jin Guangyao and beheaded by Xue Yang.
Ji Li; Xu Weiluo(young)	Nie Huaisang (Chinese: 聂怀桑)	The leader of Nie sect after Nie Mingjue's death and younger half-brother of Nie Mingjue. He is well known for his incompetence and is nicknamed the Head-Shaker. Often, he is seen carrying around a fan. However, there is more to him than most think.
Jiang Weijia	Chief General of Qinghe Nie Sect (Chinese: 聂氏总领)	He always bullies Jin Guangyao and is later killed by him.

==== Qishan Wen Sect ====
Actor	Character	Introduction
Xiu Qing	Wen Ruohan (Chinese: 温若寒)	The leader of Wen sect, Chief Cultivator, and father of Wen Chao and Wen Xu. He is an ambitious man who wants to rule over the five sects by restoring the Stygian Iron (Chinese: 阴铁).
Wang Rong	Wen Xu (Chinese: 温旭)	The eldest son of Wen RuoHan, a cruel and violent man. He is less intelligent, but also less cowardly, than his brother.
He Peng	Wen Chao (Chinese: 温晁)	The second son of Wen Ruohan. He is one of the main antagonists in the first half of the show and is cruel, arrogant, and rude. However, in the face of danger, he immediately adopts a pathetic, cowardly nature due to his fright. He enjoys punishing and hurting others, furthering his sadistic nature. In the middle of the show, Wen Chao was brutally mutilated and eventually murdered by Wei Wuxian out of revenge.
Meng Ziyi; Lin Chenxi (young)	Wen Qing (Chinese: 温情)	A renowned physician of a side branch of the Wen sect and Wen Ning's older sister. She is aloof, cold, and extremely intelligent. She is protective toward her brother and initially dislikes Wei Wuxian, but eventually warms up to him as he becomes one of the only people to treat her kindly after the Wen sect is overthrown.
Yu Bin; Su Qiuyi (young)	Wen Ning (Chinese: 温宁)	Courtesy name: Qionglin (Chinese: 琼林). Also known as The Ghost General (Chinese: 鬼将军), he is the right-hand man of Wei Wuxian during his time as the Yiling Patriarch. He was a shy person and a stutterer when he was alive due to his strange illness and grew to trust Wei Wuxian after being showered with kindness by him. As a fierce corpse, he is prone to outbursts of anger, but otherwise remains innocent, gentle, and shy.
Feng Mingjing	Wen Zhuliu (Chinese: 温逐流)	Also known as the Core-Melting Hand (Chinese: 化丹手) due to his ability to melt a Golden Core and is Wen Chao's protector. The Wen Sect's most powerful warrior, he holds to a strict and inscrutable code which included undying loyalty to his cruel masters. He was eventually murdered by Wei Wuxian.
Lu Enjie	Wang Lingjiao (Chinese: 王灵娇)	The former maid of Wen Chao's wife and Wen Chao's lover. She is an arrogant and pompous woman; however, upon facing any real threat, she immediately cowers, for unlike Wen Chao she is not only cowardly but also inept.
Zhang Bin	Wen Mao (Chinese: 温卯)	An ancestor of the Wen sect. He was the first to focus on expanding the clan instead of the sect.
Cai Yingchun	Granny Wen (Chinese: 温婆婆)	Wen Qing, Wen Ning and Wen Yuan's relative.
Yi Jianxiang	Fourth Uncle Wen (Chinese: 温四叔)	Wen Qing, Wen Ning and Wen Yuan's relative.

==== Yunmeng Jiang Sect ====
Actor	Character	Introduction
Lu Jianmin	Jiang Fengmian (Chinese: 江枫眠)	The leader of Jiang sect, husband of Yu Ziyuan, father of Jiang Yanli and Jiang Cheng. He is a kind and gentle man but holds favouritism towards Wei Wuxian.
Zhang Jingtong	Yu Ziyuan (Chinese: 虞紫鸢)	Also known as Madame Yu or San Niang. Jiang Fengmian's wife, mother of Jiang Yanli and Jiang Cheng, and original owner of the Zidian (Chinese: 紫电) bracelet. She appears tough and strict but cares for her children and husband deep down, though she dislikes Wei Wuxian.
Wang Zhuocheng; Huang Zhenchen (young)	Jiang Cheng (Chinese: 江澄)	Courtesy name: Wanyin (Chinese: 晚吟). Also known as Sandu Shengshou (Chinese: 三毒圣手), or Three Poisons Sage, he is the leader of Jiang sect following Jiang Fengmian's and Yu Ziyuan's deaths. He wields the Sandu (Chinese: 三毒) sword and the Zidian (Chinese: 紫电) ring, inheriting the latter from his mother. He is a straight-laced and strict man who abides by the rules. He has a bad temper like his mother but deeply cares for his loved ones. He had a great relationship with Wei Wuxian, but their relationship deteriorated due to differing beliefs; however, they later made up at the end of the show. For some time, he had a crush on Wen Qing, until Wen Chao ordered the death of his parents, causing him to harbor hate for the Wen sect; however, he could not bring himself to hate her completely. He dotes on his nephew Jin Ling, though he is also strict and sharp-tongued toward him.
Xuan Lu; Ye Xuantong (young)	Jiang Yanli (Chinese: 江厌离)	Jiang Fengmian and Yu Ziyuan's first child, Jiang Cheng's older sister, Wei Wuxian's disciple elder sister, Jin Zixuan's wife, and Jin Ling's mother. She is a kind and caring person, without any strong cultivation abilities. She also appears to be a very good cook, with her best dish being a lotus root and pork rib soup that she often makes for her brothers. She appears to have delicate feelings, as shown when she is snubbed multiple times by Jin Zixuan and easily persuaded when she chooses to be with him despite his family's strong opposition to Wei Wuxian whom she claims to deeply care for.
Lin Chenyue	Sixth disciple (Chinese: 六师弟)	A disciple of Yunmeng Jiang sect.
Zhang Jing	Jin Zhu (Chinese: 金姝)	A servant of Madam Yu in Yunmeng Jiang Sect.
Liu Xiaobin	Yin Zhu (Chinese: 银姝)	A servant of Madam Yu in Yunmeng Jiang Sect.

==== Yi City Arc ====
Actor	Character	Introduction
Song Jiyang	Xiao Xingchen (Chinese: 晓星尘)	Also known as Daozhang (Chinese: 道长), he is one of Baoshan Sanren's students who left the mountain for the mortal world. He wields the Shuanghua (Chinese: 霜华) sword and was best friends with Song Lan. He is gentle on the outside but determined on the inside.
Li Bowen	Song Lan (Chinese: 宋岚)	Courtesy name: Song Zichen (Chinese: 宋子琛). A cultivator from Baixue Temple, and best friend of Xiao Xingchen. He wields the Fuxue (Chinese: 拂雪) sword.
Wang Haoxuan	Xue Yang (Chinese: 薛洋)	Courtesy name: Chengmei (Chinese: 成美). A guest disciple of the Qishan Wen sect who has an affiliation with the Stygian Iron (Chinese: 阴铁). He wields the Jiangzai (Chinese: 降灾) sword. He is known for his evil and twisted ways.
Chen Zhuoxuan	Ah Qing (Chinese: 阿箐)	A young maiden who lived on the streets and an expert at pretending to be blind. She followed Xiao Xingchen after meeting him.

==== Mo Family ====
Actor	Character	Introduction
Sun Shengxuan	Mo Ziyuan (Chinese: 莫子渊)	Mo Xuanyu's cousin who abused him.
Jia Shuyi	Madam Mo (Chinese: 莫夫人)	Mo Xuanyu's aunt who abused him.
Liu Damin	Mister Mo (Chinese: 莫老爷)	Mo Xuanyu's uncle.
Feng Qiruo	Ah Ding (Chinese: 阿丁)	A servant of Mo.
Feng Qiruo	Ah Tong (Chinese: 阿童)	A servant of Mo.

==== Others ====
Actor	Character	Introduction
Feng Cong	Su She (Chinese: 苏涉)	Courtesy name: Minshan (Chinese: 悯善). The wimp leader of the Moling Su sect. A former outer disciple of the Gusu Lan Sect, whom he betrayed and left to establish his own with the support of Jin Guangyao, whom he holds great respect for. He is jealous of Lan Wangji's talents and has always imitated his actions.
Liu Tingyu	Baoshan Sanren (Chinese: 抱山散人)	The teacher of Xiao Xingchen and Cangse Sanren (Wei Wuxian's mother). She is Wei Wuxian's grandmaster. She was also Lan Yi's best friend.
Cao Junxiang	Ouyang Zizhen (Chinese: 欧阳子真)	The single child of the Baling Ouyang sect's leader. He is close friends with Lan Sizhui, Lan Jingyi and Jin Ling
Yu Zikuang	Xue Chonghai (Chinese: 薛重亥)	The ancient owner of the Stygian Iron (Chinese: 阴铁). He is Xue Yang's ancestor.
Niu Zhiqiang	Sect Leader Yao (Chinese: 姚宗主)	One of the gossiping elders who dislikes Wei Wuxian and spread baseless rumors about him.
Pu Changcheng	Sect Leader Ouyang (Chinese: 欧阳宗主)	Baling Ouyang sect leader and Ouyang Zizhen's father.
Zhang Ye	Yi Weichun (Chinese: 易为春)	A cultivator who participates in the Second Siege of the Burial Mounds.
Xu Xiaowen	Fang Mengchen (Chinese: 方梦臣)	A cultivator who participates in the Second Siege of the Burial Mounds.
Zhang Linran	Ah Yan (Chinese: 阿胭)	Daughter of Blacksmith Zheng who is cursed by the Heavenly Lady statue.
Li Lujin	Ah Yan's mother (Chinese: 阿胭娘)	Ah Yan's mother and Blacksmith Zheng's wife.
Fan Huawei	Bi Cao (Chinese: 碧草)	A servant of Qin Su.
Su Yue	Si Si (Chinese: 思思)	A prostitute who had to serve Jin Guangshan before his death.
Jiao Changshun	Song Lan's teacher (Chinese: 宋岚师傅)	Song Lan's teacher.
Shen Xin	Funeral Shopkeeper (Chinese: 丧葬老太)	Funeral shopkeeper at Yi City.
Huang Ying	Granny Liu (Chinese: 刘婆婆)	
Liu Fengmin	Lao Zhang (Wen Chao) (Chinese: 老丈（温晁）)	
Sun Liang	Lao Zhang (Nie Huaisang) (Chinese: 老丈（聂怀桑）)	

== Production ==
=== Pre-production and filming ===
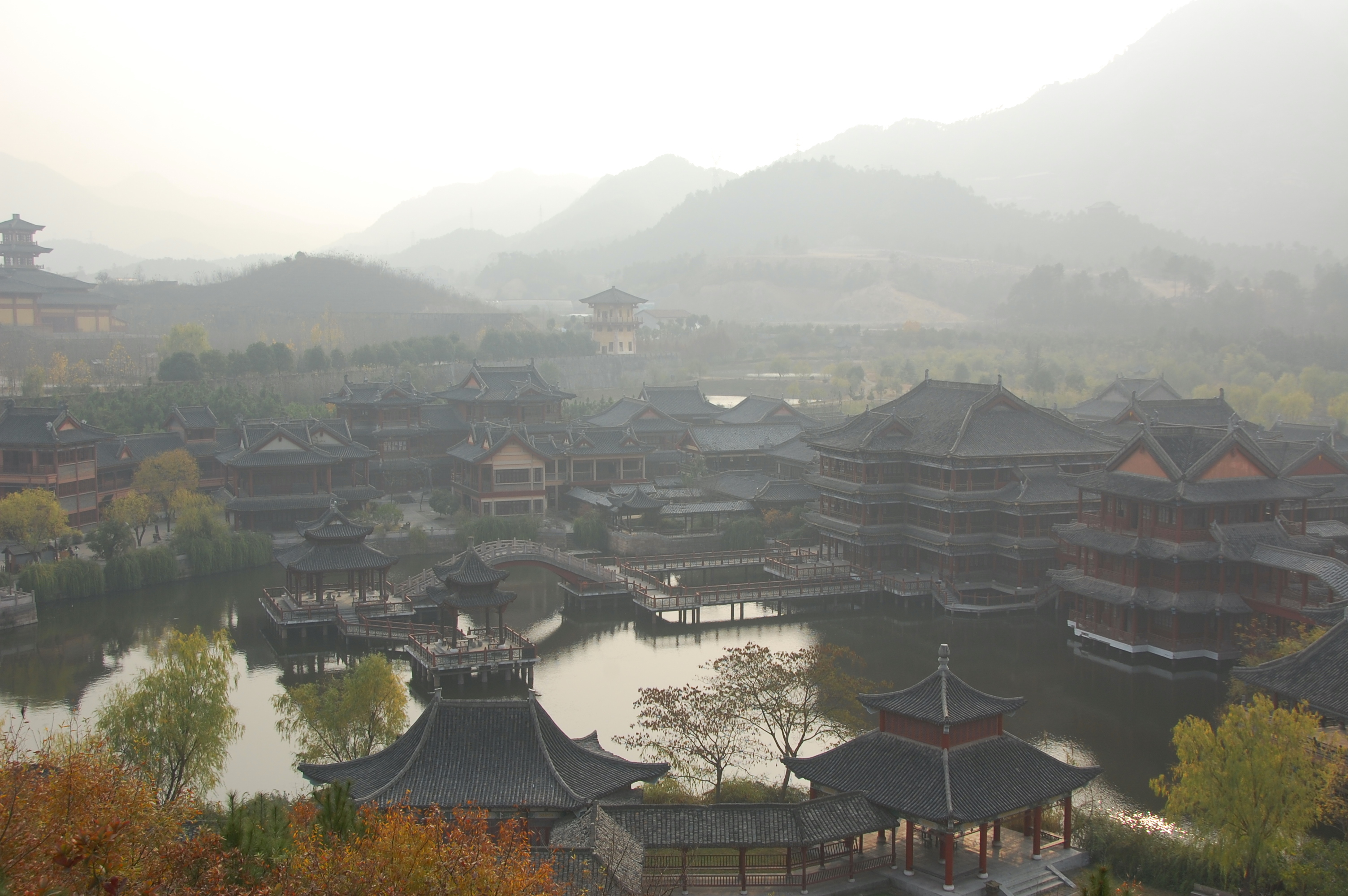
Hengdian World Studios where majority of the series was filmed

Pre-production of the drama took two and a half years, including writing and modifying of the script, establishing the world view structure and art concept, as well as building of sets. The project was first announced in March 2018.

The series was directed by Zheng Weiwen and Chen Jialin, written by Yang Xia, Deng Yaoyu, Ma Jing and Guo Guangyun, and produced by Fang Feng, Yang Xia, Wang Chu and Liu Mingyi. Yang Xia and Ji Peng served as art directors. Filming for the series was held from April to August 2018, at the Hengdian World Studios and Guizhou. Two weeks before the filming, the cast gathered for script reading sessions and underwent martial arts and etiquette training.

Due to the censorship in China, explicit BL content is removed from the drama and changes are made to the overall plot. As the original novel was written in a "flashback" style, additional scenes had to be inserted to improve the flow of the story. Two versions of the script were prepared; one is told in the chronological order of story development, and the other is a narrative trajectory that follows the original novel. Finally, on the basis of not breaking the core of the original story, and to fully develop and layer the storyline, the team decided to adopt a mixture of both styles. To better fuse the different storylines together, the team decided to forgo traditional styles of filming, and more suspense was used in the lens composition settings.

Despite being termed as a xianxia drama, The Untamed includes elements of traditional wuxia dramas fused with a new style. Using traditional wuxia values such as "chivalry and courage", it allows the younger audience to better relate to the drama.

=== Casting ===
The casting director gave a special "character card" to each of the cast members, which includes detailed descriptions of the character such as the looks, height, clothing style and even specific details such as "Wei Wuxian has a natural smiling face".

Xiao Zhan was announced as the lead actor in April 2018.

Lu Zhixing, who dubbed Wei Wuxian in the audio drama, and Bian Jiang, who dubbed Lan Wangji in the donghua adaptation of Mo Dao Zu Shi, were hired to voice Wei Wuxian and Lan Wangji in the series.

=== Design and concept ===
According to producer Yang Xia, while designing the sets and costumes of the different sects, the team started out by searching for a culture placement where the design could be based on. The costume designer for the drama is Chen Tongxun.

For the Gusu Lan sect, influence from the Song dynasty were taken into consideration while designing the costumes and sets. While designing the "Jingshi", blue and green shades were used to showcase the elegance and dignified strength/character of the sect; while darker shades of wood were used to show off the magnificence. Cascading collars and sleeves were used to design the clothes, to highlight the strictness of the sect.

For the Yunmeng Jiang sect, influences from the Hubei and Jianghan district were taken. Warm and light colors were used to showcase the cheerful and free-spirited nature of the sect. The architecture and sets were designed to be widely spaced, and yarn was used to create the feeling of "transparency". Narrow sleeves and neat designs were used to highlight the "wandering pugilistic" feel of the sect. A water recycling device was used in the lotus lake of the set, allowing ripples to be seen on the lake surface. A special ceiling was built for the ancestral hall.

For the Qinghe Nie sect, the set was designed to be surrounded by high walls and the entrance isn't easily seen because it was often invaded by Qishan Wen sect. For Qishan Wen sect, designs from the Shang dynasty were used. For Lanling Jin sect, the designs were inspired by the luxurious and elegance of the Tang dynasty.

=== Controversy ===
A fire broke out on July 11, 2018, while the cast and crew were filming in Nanma, Dongyang, at a facility that belongs to Hengdian World Studios. The fire reportedly spread as wide as 300 square meters, and resulted in the death of two crew members.

During filming, a rumor surfaced that the producers of the drama had replaced Lan WangJi as Wei Wuxian's love interest with a female character, Wen Qing, and also made Mianmian, who shares a fun, flirty relationship with Wei Wuxian and a respectful, protective relationship with Lan Wangji, into a member of Jin clan. This rumor caused significant backlash amongst fans of the original novel. The production team strongly denied such claims.

In July 2019, Tencent announced that VIP users would have the option of paying to watch episodes that had not yet aired. From August 7, the final episode was released early for some viewers who chose to avail of the option. This caused outrage among viewers of the show, who were concerned that it would risk the ending being spoiled and also the possibility that the episodes would be pirated, which would have a negative effect on views. In response, Tencent explained that in this way they could cater to demands of certain viewers who were asking for episodes to be released faster, while others could still watch the series at their preferred pace.

== Original soundtrack ==
Lin Hai composed the soundtrack of the series. The theme song was titled "忘羡" (pinyin: Wàngxiàn) before being renamed to "无羁 (pinyin: Wú jī)" from episode 11 onwards. On July 8, 2019, the digital album was released on QQ Music along with full version of the song and other character songs. The instrumental album was released on QQ Music on August 5, 2019. The physical album was released on November 2, 2019.

The Untamed OST (陈情令国风音乐专辑)

Soundtrack album by Various artists
- Released: July 8, 2019
- Recorded: 2018–2019
- Genre: Soundtrack
- Language: Chinese
- Labels: New Style Media; QQ Music
- Producer: Lin Hai

No.	Title	Lyrics	Music	Singers	Length
1.	"Unrestrained (无羁)" (Theme song – duet version)	Cheng Yi, Ming Feng	Lin Hai	Xiao Zhan & Wang Yibo	04:13
2.	"Unrestrained (无羁)" (Theme song – special version)	Cheng Yi, Ming Feng	Lin Hai	Bibi Zhou	04:14
3.	"Unrestrained (无羁)" (Theme song – solo version)	Cheng Yi, Ming Feng	Lin Hai	Xiao Zhan	04:13
4.	"Unrestrained (无羁)" (Theme song – solo version)	Cheng Yi, Ming Feng	Lin Hai	Wang Yibo	04:13
5.	"Song Ends with Chen Qing (曲尽陈情)" (Wei Wuxian’s theme song)	Yi Zhe Lian Xiao Zui Qing He	Within_Yi Ming	Xiao Zhan	03:53
6.	"Won't Forget (不忘)" (Lan Wangji’s theme song)	Song Bingyang, Yang Xia	Song Bingyang	Wang Yibo	05:16
7.	"Newborn (赤子)" (Wen Ning's theme song)	Zhang Pengpeng	Zheng Guofeng	Yu Bin	04:18
8.	"Goodbye Filled With Hatred (恨别)" (Jiang Cheng's theme song)	Yi Zhe Lian Xiao Zui Qing He	Chao Xi_Tide	Wang Zhuocheng	03:43
9.	"Involuntary (不由)" (Lan Xichen’s theme song)	Ming Feng	Windbell Project	Liu Haikuan	04:44
10.	"Separation at Qinghe (清河诀)" (Nie Mingjue & Nie Huaisang’s theme song)	Lin Qiao, Liu Enxun	Chen Xueran	Ayanga	03:44
11.	"If The Woodlands Has Something To Say (疏林如有诉)" (Wen Qing's theme song)	Zhong Wuyi	Chen Yiming	Gao Qiuzi	03:53
12.	"Passing by the Deserted City (荒城渡)" (Xue Yang's theme song)	Zhang Ying	Xia Heng, Deng Qiangzhong	Charlie Zhou	04:19
13.	"Lone City (孤城)" (Yi City group's theme song)	Lin Qiao	Yu Honglong	Sun Bolun & Chen Zhuoxuan	03:52
14.	"Youth Especially Cannot Be Bullied (最是少年不可欺)" (Youth group's theme song)	Yu Ci	Chen Yiming	Zui Xue, Zheng Fanxing, Qi Peixin & Guo Cheng	03:59
15.	"Inappeasable (意难平)" (Jiang Yanli’s theme song)	Cheng Yi, He Siwei	Lin Hai	Yin Lin	04:14
16.	"Not In Vain (不枉)" (Group song)	Yi Zhe Lian Xiao Zui Qing He	Yin Lin	Naomi Wang	03:55
17.	"Eternal Separation (永隔)" (Jiang Yanli & Jin Zixuan’s theme song)	Lin Qiao	Yu Honglong	Lara Veronin & Fabien Yang	03:37
18.	"Hatred in Life (多恨生)" (Jin Guangyao’s theme song)	Within_Yi Ming	Luo Xizhun	Zhu Xingjie	04:25

The Untamed OST (陈情令原声音乐专辑)

Soundtrack album by Various artists
- Released: August 5, 2019
- Recorded: 2018–2019
- Genre: Soundtrack
- Language: Chinese
- Labels: New Style Media; QQ Music
- Producer: Lin Hai

No.	Title	Length
1.	"The Untamed (陈情令)"	02:01
2.	"Unrestrained (无羁)" (Instrumental version)	02:33
3.	"Wangji (忘机)"	01:01
4.	"Love Entanglement (情牵)"	01:59
5.	"Lotus Pier (莲花坞)"	02:08
6.	"Maneuvering Dizi (御笛)"	02:15
7.	"Glacier (裂冰)"	03:26
8.	"Drunken Dream (醉梦)"	03:27
9.	"Burial Mound (乱葬岗)"	02:24
10.	"Sadness (伤情)"	03:01
11.	"If Life Was Just Like When We First Met (人生若只如初见)"	02:36
12.	"Won't Regret (不悔)"	02:47
13.	"Night Scamper (夜奔)"	03:51
14.	"Day and Night (寤寐)"	01:26
15.	"Song of Lucidity (清心音·乱魄抄)"	05:10
16.	"Rest (安息)"	02:32
17.	"Greenery (草木)"	02:33
18.	"Yi City (义城)"	01:03
19.	"Artful Child (狡童)"	01:44
20.	"Sunshot (射日)"	02:28
21.	"Unrestrained (无羁)" (Piano version)	01:23

=== Sales ===
On August 19, QQ Music announced that the sales for the soundtrack album had broken 15.000.000 yuan, officially attaining the platinum certification. As of September 2019, the album was the highest-selling soundtrack album on the platform, and ranked #15 on the list of highest-selling digital album.

== Reception ==
The series has accumulated a total of ten-billion views on Tencent Video, as of December 2021. One of the major reasons for the series' popularity is its faithfulness to the original novel, despite adaptational changes to appease censors. It was praised by People's Daily for its "wonderful presentation of Chinese characteristics"; showcasing traditional cultural elements through exquisite costumes, traditional Chinese music instruments; as well as transmitting positive values such as courage, chivalry and love for one's country. China News Service similarly highlighted the exquisite costumes and showcase of traditional etiquette, while also praising the suspenseful plot and well-connected storyline. Wang Yibo was initially criticized by viewers for his blank acting style in the first few episodes, which he later improved upon with the help of director's instructions. Moreover, the great number of female audiences of the series formed their collective identity as The Untamed Girls to participate promoting this web drama on various Chinese social media platforms.

The show has also garnered significant exposure and popularity globally for its strong plot, well-rounded characters, and elaborate clothing, makeup and stage production, as well as the use of leitmotifs to complement the storytelling.

=== Impact ===
The Untamed was one of the highest-earning dramas of 2019, bringing in earnings from fan meetings, concerts, album sales and merchandise. In overseas markets, Tencent announced in October 2019 that The Untamed had boosted WeTV's growth by 250 percent with an average of 1 million application downloads per month since the drama was first launched in June. The show's international success has invited comparisons to Korean Wave and Cool Japan.

As Tencent VIP members are allowed watch the final episodes of the show in advance, more than 2.6 million new subscribers paid to unlock the function, generating more than 78 million yuan in profit. More than 1.6 million copies of the soundtrack album were sold on Tencent Music. In addition, a merchandise store was opened in Taobao and official merchandise was sold, with earnings amounting to 1.17 million yuan. Other source of earnings include paying to unlock the full music video of "Unrestrained" in advance, as well as the Bazaar Magazine featuring both lead actors Xiao Zhan and Wang Yibo which sold more than 330,000 copies within three days, before exceeding 1.1 million copies.

==== Fan meetings ====
Catching Chen Qing Ling, a collection of academic analyses, described fan meetings as a paratext that helped sustain fan interest in The Untamed after all episodes became available. For the fan meetings, Tencent introduced a special system, where VIP members have to accumulate "star points" to get a better chance to get tickets to the fan meetings and concerts. More than 3.27 million viewers paid between 30 and 50 yuan to view the live broadcast of The Untamed National Style Concert on Tencent Video. It is estimated that the platform has earned more than 100 million yuan in revenue from that concert alone. Tickets of the concert were sold-out in less than 5 seconds, and leftover tickets were also marked up to 150,000 yuan by ticket scalpers from the original price of 627 yuan.

Responding to the demand of sold-out fan meetings in Thailand and China, in January 2020, the cast members planned to embark on a multi-city worldwide fan meetings tour. Cities included Bangkok, Singapore, Ho Chi Minh City, Tokyo, Seoul, Macau, Kuala Lumpur, Toronto, Los Angeles, New York, but was cancelled after the Bangkok concert due to the COVID-19 pandemic.

=== Accolades ===
Award	Category	Nominee	Results	Ref.
The Third Internet Film Festival	Best Director	Chen Jialin	Won	
The Third Internet Film Festival	Best New Actor	Zhu Zanjin	Won	
GQ 2019 Men of the Year	Breakthrough Actor of the Year	Wang Yibo	Won	
6th The Actors of China Award Ceremony	Best Actor (Web series)	Xiao Zhan	Nominated	
Golden Tower Award	Most Popular Drama	The Untamed	Won	
Golden Tower Award	Most Popular Actor	Xiao Zhan	Won	
Golden Tower Award	Most Popular Actor	Wang Yibo	Nominated	
Sofa Film Festival	Most Popular Actor of the Autumn	Xiao Zhan	Won	
6th Hengdian Film and TV Festival of China (Wenrong Awards)	Best Web Drama	The Untamed	Nominated	
6th Hengdian Film and TV Festival of China (Wenrong Awards)	Best Director	Chen Jialin	Won	
6th Hengdian Film and TV Festival of China (Wenrong Awards)	Best Producer	Fang Fang	Won	
3rd Yinchuan Internet Film Festival	Best Web Series	The Untamed	Nominated	
3rd Yinchuan Internet Film Festival	Best Actor (Web series)	Xiao Zhan	Won	
26th Huading Awards	Best Television Series	The Untamed	10th	
26th Huading Awards	Best Director	Chen Jialin, Zheng Weiwen	Nominated	
26th Huading Awards	Best Producer	Yang Xia, Fang Fang, Wang Chu, Liu Mingtie	Nominated	
26th Huading Awards	Best Newcomer	Xiao Zhan	Won	
26th Huading Awards	Best Newcomer	Wang Yibo	Nominated	
26th Huading Awards	Top Ten Favorite Actors	Wang Yibo	Won	
2nd Cultural and Entertainment Industry Congress	Best Actor (Drama)	Xiao Zhan	Nominated	
2nd Cultural and Entertainment Industry Congress	Breakthrough Actor (Drama)	Xiao Zhan	Nominated	
2nd Cultural and Entertainment Industry Congress	Breakthrough Actor (Drama)	Wang Yibo	Nominated	
2nd Cultural and Entertainment Industry Congress	Best Couple	Wei Wuxian and Lan Wangji (Xiao Zhan and Wang Yibo)	Nominated	
China Entertainment Industry Summit (Golden Pufferfish Awards)	Best Drama	The Untamed	Won	
China Entertainment Industry Summit (Golden Pufferfish Awards)	Best Marketing	The Untamed	Won	
China Entertainment Industry Summit (Golden Pufferfish Awards)	Producer of the Year	Yang Xia	Won	
7th Thailand Headlines Person of The Year Awards	Most Influential Award	The Untamed Cast	Won	
Tencent Music Entertainment Awards	Song of the Year	"Unrestrained" (by Xiao Zhan & Wang Yibo)	Won	
China Golden Rooster and Hundred Flowers Film Festival (1st Network Drama Awards)	Most Popular Actor	Wang Yibo	Won	
China Golden Rooster and Hundred Flowers Film Festival (1st Network Drama Awards)	Most Anticipated Actor	He Peng	Won	
20th China Video Awards	IP of the Year	The Untamed	Won	
China Radio Film & TV Media Survey	Outstanding Overseas Promotion Television Series	The Untamed	Won	
Weibo TV Series Awards	Most Popular Television Series	The Untamed	Won	
Weibo TV Series Awards	Most Popular Actor	Xiao Zhan	7th	
Weibo TV Series Awards	Most Popular Actor	Wang Yibo	4th	
Weibo TV Series Awards	Most Popular Actor	Song Jiyang	Nominated	
Weibo TV Series Awards	Most Popular Actor	Wang Zhuocheng	Nominated	
Weibo TV Series Awards	Most Popular Actor	Yu Bin	Nominated	
Weibo TV Series Awards	Most Popular Actor	Zheng Fanxing	Nominated	
Weibo TV Series Awards	Most Popular Actor	Liu Haikuan	Nominated	
Weibo TV Series Awards	Most Popular Character	Wei Wuxian (Xiao Zhan)	Won	
Weibo TV Series Awards	Most Popular Character	Lan Wangji (Wang Yibo)	2nd	
Golden Bud - The Fourth Network Film And Television Festival	Best Web Series	The Untamed	Nominated	
Golden Bud - The Fourth Network Film And Television Festival	Most Influential Web Series	The Untamed	Won	
Golden Bud - The Fourth Network Film And Television Festival	Best Web Film	The Living Dead	Nominated	
Golden Bud - The Fourth Network Film And Television Festival	Most Popular Director	Chen Jialin	Won	
Golden Bud - The Fourth Network Film And Television Festival	Best Actor	Xiao Zhan	Nominated	
Golden Bud - The Fourth Network Film And Television Festival	Best Actor	Wang Yibo	Nominated	
Golden Bud - The Fourth Network Film And Television Festival	Best Newcomer	Guo Cheng	Nominated	
Golden Bud - The Fourth Network Film And Television Festival	Best Newcomer	Song Jiyang	Nominated	
Golden Bud - The Fourth Network Film And Television Festival	Best Newcomer	Wang Zhuocheng	Nominated	
Golden Bud - The Fourth Network Film And Television Festival	Best Newcomer	Zheng Fanxing	Nominated	
Golden Bud - The Fourth Network Film And Television Festival	Best Newcomer	Wang Haoxuan	Nominated	
Golden Bud - The Fourth Network Film And Television Festival	New Force Energy	Wang Haoxuan	Won	
Sogou In Award	Drama of the Year	The Untamed	Won	
Kugou Music Awards	Song of the Year	"Unrestrained" (by Xiao Zhan & Wang Yibo)	Won	
Film and TV Role Model 2019 Ranking	Drama of the Year	The Untamed	Nominated	
Film and TV Role Model 2019 Ranking	Actor of the Year	Xiao Zhan	Nominated	
Baidu Fudian Awards	Top Ten Television Series	The Untamed	Won	
Sina Film & TV Awards	Top Ten Television Series	The Untamed	Won	
8th China Student Television Festival	Most Watched Television Series	The Untamed	Won	
Tencent Video All Star Awards	Web Drama of the Year	The Untamed	Won	
Tencent Video All Star Awards	Popular Actors of the Year	Xiao Zhan	Won	
Tencent Video All Star Awards	Popular Actors of the Year	Wang Yibo	Won	
Tencent Video All Star Awards	Most Promising Actor	Liu Haikuan	Won	
Tencent Video All Star Awards	Doki New Force	Wang Zhuocheng	Won	
Tencent Entertainment White Paper	Television Actor of the Year	Xiao Zhan	Won	
Tencent Entertainment White Paper	Star Celebrity Board: Television Actor of the Year	Xiao Zhan	Won	
Weibo Awards Ceremony	Hot Drama of the Year	The Untamed	Won	
Media and Entertainment Industry Reporter	Innovative Marketing of the Year	The Untamed	Won	
Hengdian World Studio Classic Ranking	Most Popular Drama	The Untamed	Won	
Hengdian World Studio Classic Ranking	Most Popular Character	Wei Wuxian (Xiao Zhan)	Won	
WeTV 2020 Awards	Best Wuxia / Xianxia Drama	The Untamed	Won	
WeTV 2022 Awards	Artist of the Year	Xiao Zhan	Nominated	
Tencent Group	Business Breakthrough Award	The Untamed	Won	

== Promotion ==
Date	Event	Attendees	Ref.
July 12, 2019	The Untamed Fanmeeting	Xiao Zhan, Wang Yibo, Yu Bin, Liu Haikuan, Zhu Zanjin, Wang Haoxuan, Wang Yizhou, Song Jiyang, Li Bowen, Qi Peixin, Zheng Fanxing, Guo Cheng	
July 20, 2019	The Untamed Roadshow at Hangzhou	Yu Bin, Zheng Fanxing, Song Jiyang	
July 26, 2019	Harper's Bazaar China	Xiao Zhan, Wang Yibo	
July 26, 2019	The Untamed Roadshow at Xi'an	Cao Yuchen, Qi Peixin, Zheng Fanxing	
July 27, 2019	The Untamed Roadshow at Wuhan	Yu Bin, Song Jiyang, Wang Haoxuan	
July 28, 2019	Day Day Up	Xiao Zhan, Wang Yibo	
August 4, 2019	The Untamed Roadshow at Shanghai	Yu Bin, Wang Zhuocheng, Liu Haikuan, Zhu Zanjin, Ji Li, Chen Zhuoxuan, Song Jiyang	
August 10, 2019	Happy Camp	Xiao Zhan, Wang Yibo, Yu Bin, Wang Zhuocheng	
August 10, 2019	The Untamed Roadshow at Qingdao	Liu Haikuan, Zhu Zanjin, Wang Haoxuan, Ji Li, Wang Yizhou, Song Jiyang, Li Bowen, Cao Yuchen, Qi Peixin, Zheng Fanxing, Guo Cheng, He Peng, Chen Zhuoxuan	
August 26, 2019	Crazy Magic	Yu Bin, Liu Haikuan, Wang Zhuocheng, Xuan Lu, Meng Ziyi	
September 21, 2019	The Untamed Thailand Fanmeeting	Xiao Zhan, Wang Yibo, Yu Bin, Wang Zhuocheng, Liu Haikuan, Cao Yuchen, Song Jiyang, Chen Zhuoxuan	
November 1–2, 2019	The Untamed National Style Concert	Xiao Zhan, Wang Yibo, Yu Bin, Wang Zhuocheng, Liu Haikuan, Zhu Zanjin, Wang Haoxuan, Ji Li, Wang Yizhou, Song Jiyang, Li Bowen, Cao Yuchen, Qi Peixin, Zheng Fanxing, Guo Cheng, He Peng, Lu Enjie, Wang Yifei, Chen Zhuoxuan, Zhang Jingtong, Xiu Qing, Gao Qiuzi; Lara Veronin, Naomi Wang, Fabien Yang, Yin Lin, Zhou Shen, Zhu Xingjie	

=== Thailand Fanmeeting ===
The fanmeeting was held in Bangkok at Impact Arena on September 21, 2019, and was attended by 9,000 fans. The proceeds of the Thailand fanmeeting were donated to the people of Ubon Ratchathani Province, which had been hit by floods.

=== The Untamed National Style Concert ===
The concert was held from November 1 and 2, 2019 at Nanjing Qing'ao Sports Park with a capacity of 20,000 seats. Tan Yizhe served as the music executive of the concert, while Yuan Jing served as the creative director. Ticket prices were sold at 627 yuan and 1980 yuan, to commemorate the first day of broadcast and the last day of filming of The Untamed respectively. 16 songs were sung in the concert, along with a segment for interactions and games. Prior to purchasing tickets on Maoyan, fans had to answer a questionnaire based on the show. Viewers were able to live-stream the concert via Tencent Video, with a fee of 30 to 50 yuan.

=== Mobile game ===
A mobile gamed based on The Untamed is set to be released via NetEase.

=== The Untamed Boys ===
The six-membered group named "The Untamed Boys" (Chinese: 陈情少年), also known as T.U.B.S., which consists of Yu Bin, Ji Li, Cao Yuchen, Zheng Fanxing, Song Jiyang & Li Bowen, first made their appearance in The Untamed National Style Concert performing the song "Fearless". They subsequently appeared in T Mall 11/11 Shopping Festival, performing the song "Fairytale"; as well as featured in Elle Men's New Youth magazine. They appeared in the variety show Youths Learning In Progress (Chinese: 少年听学中), which aired on Tencent Video starting December 5, 2019. On January 7, 2021, Zheng Fanxing and Song Jiyang announced their departure from the group due to busy schedules and pursuing their solo careers in acting.

== International broadcast ==
Network	Country	Notes/Ref.
Mediacorp Channel 8	Singapore	
AsiaN	South Korea	
Wowow TV	Japan	
Rakuten TV	Japan	
U-Next	Japan	
Asia Dramatic TV	Japan	
MX Player	India	
YouTube	International	
Amazon Prime	International	
Viki	International	
Netflix	International	
WeTV	International	
ODC	International	
Kapamilya Channel; A2Z; TV5 iWantTFC	Philippines	

== Spin-off films ==
Two spin-off films were released, serving as side stories to the television series.

=== The Living Dead (2019) ===
The Living Dead (Chinese: 生魂; pinyin: Shenghun) was released on November 7, 2019. The film focuses on the characters of Wen Ning and Lan Sizhui.

Synopsis

Near Qishan Mountain, there is a little town called Fu Feng, which is nicknamed the "City That Never Turns Dark". This city is home to the legend of the "Lit Lamp Murderer". Wen Ning arrives at Fu Feng and realizes the abnormality of the town. The whole town is filled with only the weak and sick; and is very run down. When the night arrives, Wen Ning lights up a lamp to attract ghost shadows. Just as he is about to capture them, a ray of blue sword light appears and the black shadow disappears. Wen Ning looks up and sees his nephew, Lan Sizhui. Wen Ning and Lan Sizhui decide to work together and solve the mystery to capture the culprit behind the mysterious incidents.

==== Cast ====
- Yu Bin as Wen Ning
- Zheng Fan Xing as Lan Sizhui
- Wang Yifei as Xiao Qing
- Gao Han as Xiao Yi
- He Longlong as Zhou Zishu

=== Fatal Journey (2019) ===
Fatal Journey (Chinese: 乱魄; pinyin: Luanpo) focuses on the story of the Qinghe Nie brothers and Jin Guangyao.

Synopsis

The Qinghe Nie sect finds itself dealing with problems of its ancestral tomb of swords. Nie Mingjue takes his brother, Nie Huaisang, to restore the tomb to its original state and ensure peace in the Nie sect. Through this, Huaisang goes from being a playful disciple and after preparing, he becomes the sect leader of the next generation and Mingjue learns, understands his brother more and helps him grow.

==== Cast ====
- Ji Li as Nie Huaisang
- Wang Yizhou as Nie Mingjue
- Zhu Zanjin as Jin Guangyao
- He Xiang (何翔) as Nie Zonghui
- Rao Guo Feng (饶国锋) as Qinghe Nie Sect Disciple
- Xuan Yue Wen (宣粤文) as Nie Mingjue (young)
- Xu Wai Luo (徐崴罗) as Nie Huaisang (young)
- Zhou Lu (周路) as Cuo Zei
