= Media history of China =

The media history of China addresses communication-enabling systems and technology throughout China's history. In the modern era the reach of Chinese communication networks has expanded and their format has shifted from preindustrial paper media towards various digital and mass media technologies.

This article provides a timeline of China's media-related history, including print publishing networks, its contemporary mass media, news media, computer technology, and the history of the Internet.

== Imperial dynasties ==
Woodblock printing was invented during the Tang dynasty, and would later come to be the most popular medium of serial literary production in imperial China. Yet, it was only during the later Song that print media expanded to occupy a crucial position in the empire's state and literary spheres. The tradition of court gazettes based on official reports from the capital dates to the Song dynasty period.

By the Ming dynasty, the state no longer demanded regulation or licensing of publishers, and both central and local government bodies issued their own print materials. From the mid-fifteenth century, Ming-era print culture flourished, both in woodblock and movable type technology.

The exceptional volume of information supported by China's print media networks was notable to outside observers. When Jesuit missionary Matteo Ricci arrived in the late sixteenth century to evangelize to China, he noted the "exceedingly large number of books in circulation." Ricci commented on the wider availability and use of paper. Being European, Ricci's understanding of paper was based on expensive production technologies and materials like vellum or rag, while Chinese methods using pulped hemp and plant fibers rendered paper comparatively cheap.

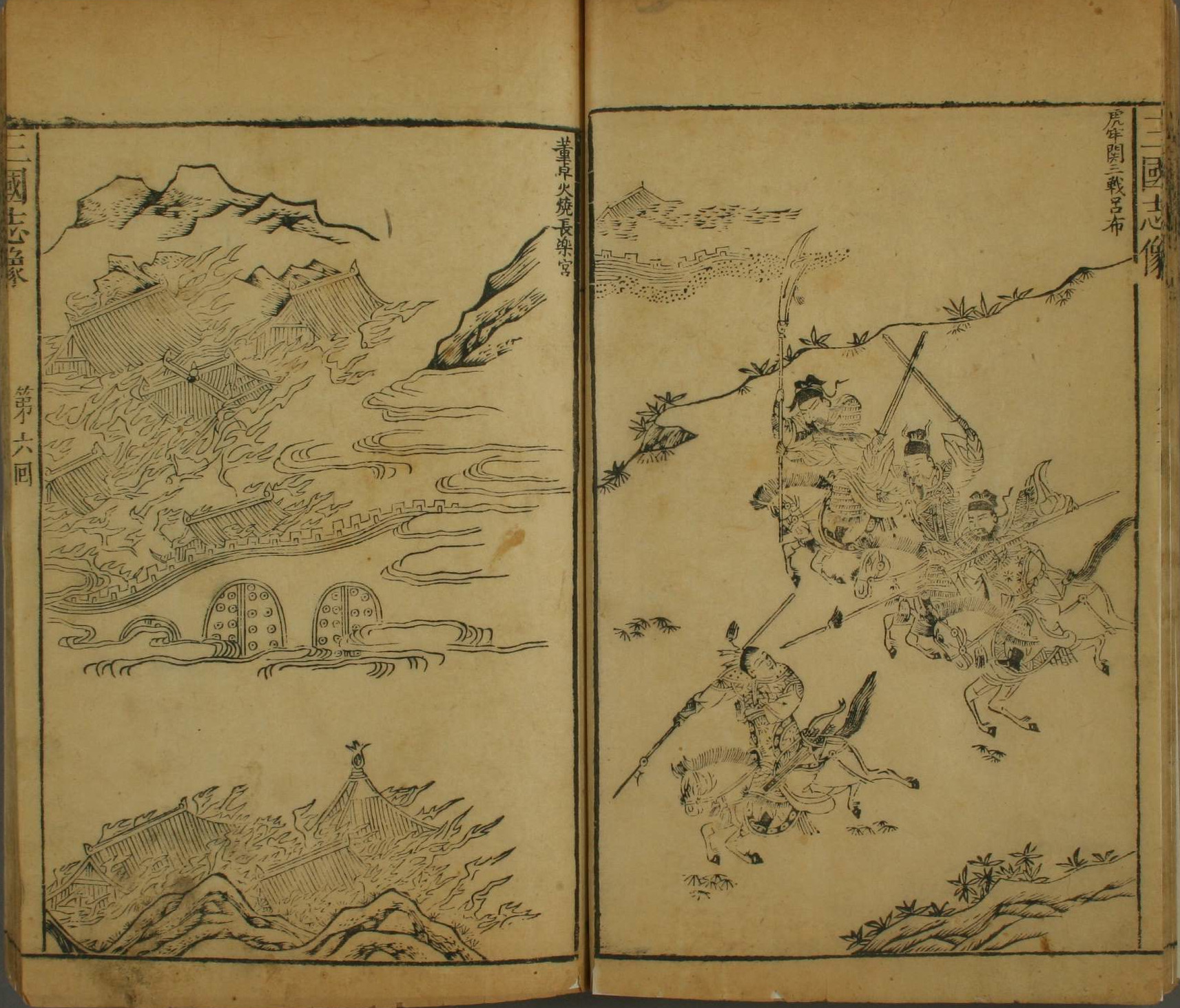
This spread from a print copy of the Romance of the Three Kingdoms has images and captions supplementing the original text. Paratext such as annotations and captions added on to classics were an important conduit for literary attitudes.

In late Ming society, a community unified by print literature formed consisting of authors, their readers, and the merchant-scholar publishers connecting them through the growing commercial publishing industry. This print-oriented literary public sphere mediated a new literary field of public opinion. The primary vehicles of literary consensus were considered to be books themselves, but alternate channels coexisted with the books themselves, and reinforced their impact as a medium. Commercial networks of publishing and print technology enabled institutions that relied on print books, such as literary societies and government gazettes, to further integrate the literate public.

The transition from the Ming to the Qing dynasty during the mid seventeenth century brought disruption and development in the Chinese media system. After an initial decline in printing and publishing during the violent transition, the literary infrastructure of China recovered and spread out under the new dynasty. At the same time, the state’s role as media organizer expanded through the Qing’s distribution of dibao, state publications used to deliver official notices.

Although both provincial and capital authorities had circulated gazettes during dynasties going back at least to the Song, the Qing’s attention to their jingbao (lit. capital report), surpassed that of previous dynasties. From the very beginning of their imperial rule out of Beijing, the Qing established their gazette as an authoritative source credited by government officials and peasants alike. Although the clear primary purpose of the jingbao was for use by officials in the coordination of governance, over the course of the Qing period an increasingly public audience of interested readers came to use the gazette as a casual source of news.

== Opium Wars through end of Qing ==
Following the Qing dynasty's defeat in the Opium Wars, Western powers forced China to open treaty ports for foreign trade. The earliest newspapers in China developed in the treaty ports. Among them was China's first modern newspaper, Shanghai Xinbao, which began publishing in 1861. Throughout the late 19th century, printed newspapers began to increase in popularity. The growth of magazines and newspapers contributed to the development of popular culture.

Telegraphy arrived in China in 1870s. Telegraphed circulars circulated news intended for publication in newspaper and became a common mechanism for propaganda.

By the time of the First Sino-Japanese War, most of China's newspapers were owned by foreign missionaries and foreign merchants in the treaty ports. Foreign-owned newspapers and principles of extraterritoriality imposed by the foreign powers in the treaty port decreased the Qing dynasty's ability to censor and control the flow of information. Through foreign ownership, underlying mercantile interests, and the profit motive, newspapers in the late Qing era had significant limitations and bias in their reporting.

The Qing dynasty's defeat in the First Sino-Japanese War resulted in political agitation and a rapid increase in the number of Chinese-owned political newspapers. Newspapers became increasingly popular in the early 20th century. Through the early 20th century, the distinctions between newspapers and magazine periodicals were not sharp; in form, newspapers were also typically thin booklets.

== 1911 through founding of PRC ==
China was significantly politically fragmented between 1911 and 1927. In this environment, those who held political power and military power embraced the use of modern media to compete for power and to shape public opinion. Newspapers in the early 20th century proliferated among intellectuals and the urban bourgeois but distribution remained limited, taking days or weeks to reach even nearby villages into the late 1920s.

The "four great papers of the Republican period" were Shenbao (based in Shanghai), Yishibao, Dagongbao, and Mingguoribao (a Nationalist daily). Journalism became viewed as a reputable profession over the course of the 1920s.

In 1920, Li Da founded the first Chinese Communist Party (CCP) publication, The Communist.

The CCP during its 2nd National Congress in July 1922 decided to establish an authoritative publication to disseminate its views on anti-imperialism and revolution. This resulted in the founding of The Guide Weekly in Shanghai. It was the first openly-published newspaper of the central organ of the CCP.

Radio technology first arrived in China in the winter of 1922-1923. At the time, mass media in China was slow or non-existent in many areas, and much of the population was illiterate.

On 11 December 1931, the Chinese Soviet Republic government established its official newspaper, Red China.

A Japanese air raid against Shanghai on January 28, 1932, destroyed a significant amount of China's film industry and resulted in the loss of many early Chinese films. It also prompted an increase in news film production in China.

On 24 April 1937, Liberation Weekly was founded. It was the CCP's most authoritative political and theoretical magazine from 1937 to 1941.

During the Second Sino-Japanese War, the Nationalists had mobile projectionists travel in rural China to play anti-Japanese propaganda films. As the invading Japanese forces captured China's major coastal cities, newspapers relocated to China's interior. This decentralized newspaper publishing and contributed to the rise of varied newspaper formats like tabloids. News reporting practices also changed and newspapers responded to the needs of a public seeking basic wartime information; writing became more down-to-earth, personal, and included more overt patriotic sentiment.

In 1944, the CCP welcomed a large group of foreign (primarily American) journalists to Yan'an. In an effort to contrast the party with the Nationalists, the CCP generally did not censor these foreign reports. In December 1945, the CCP Central Committee instructed the party to facilitate the work of American journalists out of the hope that it would have an influence on American policies toward China.

Among the points of negotiation in the Second United Front was the ability of the CCP to openly publish newspapers and periodicals in KMT areas. In late August 1937, Zhou Enlai and KMT Central Publicity Department head Shao Lizi agreed that the newspapers Xinhua Daily and Chuin Chung Weekly would be published in these areas.

After Japan's defeat in the Second Sino-Japanese War, Mao Zedong instructed CCP cadres to immediately enter Wuhan, Nanjing, Hong Kong, and Shanghai to begin news agencies and publishing in advance of the Nationalists' arrival.

Mao stated that the masses should be involved in journalism. In his widely publicized remarks with journalists at Jin-Sui Daily in 1948, Mao said, "With our newspapers, too, we must rely on everybody, on the masses of the people, on the whole Party to run them, not merely on a few persons behind closed doors."

In late 1948, the CCP required that foreigners obtain approval from the CCP Central Committee before publishing newspapers or magazines, asserting that "the vast majority of these propaganda apparatuses are controlled by reactionaries". This decision reflected the party's view that news media was a site of class struggle.

== 1950s ==
In both the Yan'an era of the 1930s and the early 1950s, the CCP encouraged grassroots journalism in the form of "worker-peasant correspondents," an idea originating from the Soviet Union.

At the PRC's founding in 1949, there were less than 600 movie theatres in the country. Projectionists traveled through rural China showing films, a process modeled on the Soviet Union's use of mobile film teams to spread revolutionary culture. In the 1950s and the 1960s, the CCP built cinemas (among other cultural buildings) in industrial districts on urban peripheries. Rural mobile projectionist teams and urban movie theaters were generally managed through the PRC's cultural bureaucracy. Trade unions and People's Liberation Army (PLA) propaganda departments also operated film exhibition networks. In 1950s China, a common view of film was that it served as "socialist distance horizon education". For example, films promoted rural collectivization.

Newspapers and journals in the 1950s encompassed a broad range of voices and differences in terms of public and private influence. People's Daily was closely edited and vetted by Hu Qiaomu. Regional and municipal newspapers often followed the model of People's Daily and Xinhua News Agency, but also pursued different interests in terms of content editorial stance. At newspapers like Guangming Daily and Wenhui Bao, editors operated with relatively free decision-making, but were subject to patron-client relationships and impacted by their own changing analysis of the Communist Party and Mao Zedong's leadership. Literary journals had varying degrees of oversight by central or regional party bodies. Student newspapers, newsletters, journals, and big character posters supplied another layer of perspectives and affiliations.

After the PRC's founding, the CCP ousted most American reporters. Various European news agency like Reuters and Agence France-Presse, and the Canadian Globe and Mail, were allowed to remain. China invited some American reporters to China in 1956, but the administration of U.S. President Dwight D. Eisenhower refused, upholding its ban on travel to China. U.S. newspapers criticized the Eisenhower's administration decision as antithetical to the free press.

In 1950, 1,800 projectionists from around the country traveled to Nanjing for a training program. These projectionists replicated the training program in their own home provinces to develop more projectionists. Nanjing was later termed a "Cradle of People's Cinema." The PRC sought to recruit women and ethnic minority projectionists in an effort to more effectively reach marginalized communities.

In 1950, approximately 1 million radio sets existed in China, mostly in bourgeois urban households. The PRC began establishing a radio reception network assigning "radio receptionists" in schools, army units, and factories. These receptionists organized group listening sessions and also transcribed and distributed written content of radio broadcasts. Through the practice of rooftop broadcasting, village criers using homemade megaphones would also relay the content of radio broadcasts. Radio receptionists and rooftop broadcasting remained a significant component of broadcasting practices until wireless broadcasting became widespread in the 1960s and 1970s.

In April 1954, Language Learning became the first magazine periodical in China to switch completely from the traditional right-to-left vertical text style to left-to-right horizontal text. The first newspaper to also make the complete switch was Guangming Daily in 1955.

In the 1950s and 1960s, Red Star Radios became one of the Four Big Things, important and desirable consumer goods that demonstrated an increase in Chinese standards of living.

In 1956, the "Long-Range Plan for the Development of Science and Technology from 1956-1967" commissioned a group of scientists and researchers to develop computer technology for national defense. The Plan's goals included furthering radio, telecommunication, and atomic energy projects. Shortly thereafter, the first state-sanctioned computer development program began with the Chinese Academy of Sciences-affiliated Beijing Institute of Computing Technology (ICT).

In 1958, the first Chinese-made computer was developed by the Institute of Military Engineering at the University of Harbin as part of the ICT. The computer, dubbed the 901, was a vacuum-tube computer. The 901 was a copy of an earlier Soviet model.

== 1960s ==
After the Chinese stopped receiving Soviet technical and financial assistance in 1960, there was a deeply felt loss of technical expertise that stunted development. Additionally, the Cultural Revolution slowed technological progress. However, transistor-based computers including the 109B, 109C, DJS-21, DJS-5 and C-2 were developed during the 1960s. Despite the large improvements in the computing power of these machines, and advances in the hardware like integrated-circuitry there is little evidence that computers were being designed for widespread consumer use.

During this period of Chinese "self-reliance," the computers developed in the second half of the 1960s did not resemble Soviet computers nor their Western counterparts. The new transistor-based machines were distinctly Chinese creations.

As part of the Socialist Education Movement, mobile film projectionist units showed films and slideshows that emphasized class struggle and encouraged audience members to discuss bitter experiences onstage.

After the 1964 Gulf of Tonkin incident, Chinese media printed many articles which favorably depicted U.S. anti-war demonstrations. In response to U.S. bombing of North Vietnam, China launched the Resist America, Aid Vietnam campaign, which among other forms of expression, used media such as film and photography exhibitions to denounce U.S. aggression and praise Vietnamese resistance.

During the early period (1966-1968) of the Cultural Revolution, freedom of the press in China was at its peak. While the number of newspapers declined in this period, the number of independent publications by mass political organizations grew. Mao used mass media to encourage rebels to establish their own independent mass political organizations and their own publications. According to China's National Bureau of Statistics, the number of newspapers dropped from 343 in 1965, to 49 in 1966, and then to a 20th-century low of 43 in 1967. At the same time, the number of publications by mass organizations such as Red Guards grew to an estimated number as high as 10,000.

Independent political groups could publish broadsheets and handbills, as well as leaders' speeches and meeting transcripts which would normally have been considered highly classified. From 1966 to 1969, at least 5,000 new broadsheets by independent political groups were published. Several Red Guard organizations also operated independent printing presses to publish newspapers, articles, speeches, and big-character posters. For example, the largest student organization in Shanghai, the Red Revolutionaries, established a newspaper that had a print run of 800,000 copies by the end of 1966. Michael Schoenhals writes that one of the most striking features of the Cultural Revolution is the spread of publications by "revolutionary mass organizations" in 1966 and 1967, reflecting a plurality of values and opinions in society at odds with conventional stereotypes about Red Guards. Government controls on restricted literature also collapsed during the Cultural Revolution.

Mobile film units brought Chinese cinema to the countryside and were crucial to the standardization and popularization of culture during this period, particularly including revolutionary model operas. During the Cultural Revolution's early years, mobile film teams traveled to rural areas with news reels of Mao meeting with Red Guards and Tiananmen Square parades, and welcomed ceremoniously in rural communities. These news reels became known as hong bao pian ("red treasure films"), analogous to how the Little Red Books were dubbed hong bao shu ("red treasure books"). The release of the filmed versions of the revolutionary model operas resulted in a re-organization and expansion of China's film exhibition network.

From 1965 to 1976, the number of film projection units in China quadrupled, total film audiences nearly tripled, and the national film attendance rate doubled. The Cultural Revolution Group drastically reduced ticket prices which, in its view, would allow film to better serve the needs of workers and of socialism.

Rusticated youths with an interest in broadcast technology frequently operated the rural radio stations after 1968. Rusticated youths likewise constituted a significant portion of film projectionists.

== 1970s ==
The Cultural Revolution continued to severely stagnate technological development in the first half of the 1970s.

American journalists first returned to China in 1971 with the U.S. tabletop tennis delegation as part of ping-pong diplomacy.

Loudspeakers (mostly wired) remained the dominant aspect of the Chinese audio technology until 1976. Despite transistorization of radios in the 1960s, private radios continued to lag behind loudspeakers due to the comparatively high cost of transistor radios as well as concerns about private radio listening to "enemy" shortwave broadcasts.

Until the 1976 invention of the Cangjie input method, computing technologies lacked an efficient way of inputting Chinese characters into computers. The Cangjie method uses Chinese character radicals to construct characters.

In 1977, the first microcomputer, the DJS-050 was developed.

In 1978, China's aggressive plan for technological development was announced at the Chinese National Conference on Science and Technology. Further developing microcomputers, integrated circuits, and national databases were all declared priorities.

Beginning in the late 1970s, increased marketization and privatization of the Chinese media led to an increase in the increase of economic incentives in news reporting and thereby impacted news reporting.

== 1980s ==
In the early 1983, there were approximately 162,000 film projection units in China. Most of these were used by mobile movie teams which showed films outdoors in rural and urban areas.

In 1980, the Chinese computing technology was estimated to be about 15 years behind United States technology. From the early 1980s on, China's leaders recognized that their nationalistic development strategy was inhibiting their scientific competitiveness with the West. Therefore, imports from the United States and Japanese companies such as IBM, DEC, Unisys, Fujitsu, Hitachi, and NEC greatly increased. However, high tariffs discouraged the direct import of computers, instead encouraging foreign corporations to provide hardware and software to domestic enterprises.

In 1980, the GB 2312 Code of Chinese Graphic Character Set for Information Interchange-Primary Set was created allowing for 99% of contemporary characters to be easily expressed.

In 1982, the Shanghai Bureau of Education chose 8 elementary students and 8 middle-school students from each district and gave them very basic computer training. This is the first experiment using a computer in Chinese children's education.

In 1983, the first Chinese supercomputer,"Galaxy," was developed.

In 1984, the New Technology Developer Inc. (the predecessor of the Legend Group and now known as Lenovo) was funded by the Chinese Academy of Sciences.

In 1985, the Great Wall 0520CH, was the first personal computer that used Chinese character generation and display technology, therefore capable of processing information in Chinese. The Great Wall models commanded a substantial share of the domestic computer market for the next decade.

The 1986, Seventh Development Plan marked a turning point in China's commercial computer industry, as the electronics industry was designated as a "pillar" that would help drive the entire Chinese economy.

In 1987, Professor Qian Tianbai sent the first email from China, signifying China's first use of the Internet. The email message was "Across the Great Wall we can reach every corner in the world."

== 1990s ==
In 1990, Professor Qian Prof. Werner Zorn registered the country code top level domain .CN.

In 1994, the National Computing & Networking Facilities of China project opened a 64K dedicated circuit to the Internet. Since then, China has been officially recognized as a country with full functional Internet accessibility.

In 1996, CHINANET was completed and operational. Nationwide internet services are available to the general public. China's first Internet café soon followed.

The 1996 Ninth Five Year National Development Plan emphasized the development of technical infrastructure and expanding the personal computer industry.

The State Administration of Radio, Film, and Television (SARFT) began the Connecting Every Village with Radio and TV project in 1998; the program extended radio and television broadcasting to every village in China.

In 1998, development of the Great Firewall was started, a tool that is used to monitor and control what can be said and seen on the Internet.

In 1999, the National Research Center for Intelligent Computing Systems announced that it developed a super server system capable of conducting 20 billion floating-point operations per second, making China one of the few nations in the world that have developed high-performance servers.

By the end of 1999, there were approximately 20 million PCs in operation in China.

The late 1990s through the early 2000s were a high point for investigative journalism in China.

== 2000s ==
China's accession to the World Trade Organization (WTO) contributed to the rapid growth of China's media and entertainment industries. Beginning in 2005, regulation of celebrities in these areas became a more significant policy focus in China.

In 2004, the Ministry of Industry and Information Technology began the Connecting Every Village Project to promote universal access to telecommunication and internet services in rural China. The MIIT required that six state-owned companies, including the main telecommunications and internet providers China Mobile, China Unicom, and China Telecom, build the communications infrastructure and assist in financing the project. The program's implementation was influenced by SARFT's earlier success in the Connecting Every Village with Radio and TV Project. Beginning in late 2009, the program began building rural telecenters each of which had at least one telephone, computer, and internet connectivity. Approximately 90,000 rural telecenters were built by 2011. As of December 2019, 135 million rural households had used broadband internet. The program successfully extended internet infrastructure throughout rural China and promoted development of the internet.

== 2010s ==
China began implementing a National Broadband Strategy in 2013. The program aimed to increase the speed, quality, and adoption of broadband and 4G networks. As of 2018, 96% of administrative villages had fiber optic networks and 95% had 4G networks.

Since 2014, the Leading Small Group for Comprehensively Deepening Reform initiated the "Internet Plus" campaign and the "Network Convergence Campaign" to increase the digitalization of news media. The Internet Plus campaign encouraged news outlets to expand their internet presence and the Network Convergence campaign encouraged developing traditional news media formats into multimedia that is more visual and interactive for the online era.

== 2020s ==
In the 2020s, China has ranked as the world's top jailor of journalists.

In 2020, China's market for films surpassed the U.S. market to become the largest such market in the world.
