= Tang Jia San Shao =

Chinese novelist (born 1981)

- 张威
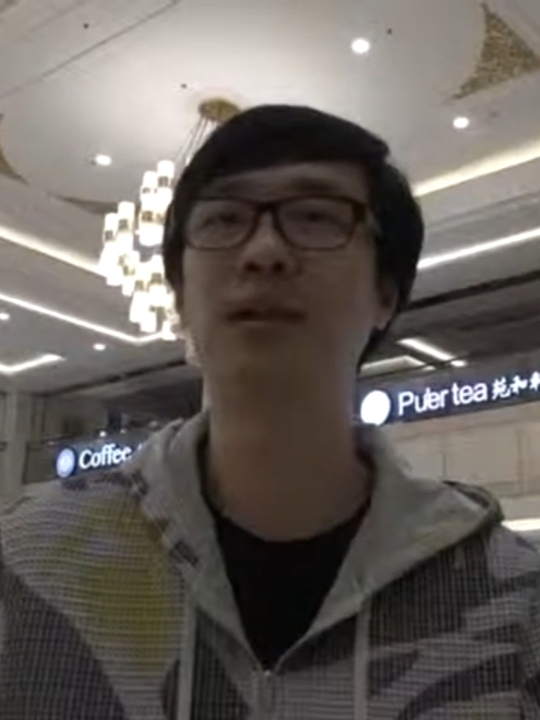
- Born: Zhang Wei; January 10, 1981 (age 45); Beijing, China
- Education: Hebei University School of Political Science and Law
- Occupation: Novelist
- Spouse: Li Mo (2007—died 2018)
- Writing career
- Years active: 2004–present
- Genres: Fantasy; Romance
- Notable awards: 2012: Guinness World Records, 86 months of consecutive daily releases

Zhang Wei (born January 10, 1981), also known under the pen name Tang Jia San Shao (唐家三少), is a Chinese novelist. He is the author of the epic fantasy series Douluo Dalu, also known as Soul Land, which became a multimedia franchise including a TV series (Douluo Continent), an animated series, various comic adaptations and video games.

Zhang has been listed as one of China's top-earning web fiction writers (2012-2017). In 2015, he was included in the Forbes list of Chinese celebrities. He was a delegate to the Thirteenth National Committee of the Chinese People's Political Consultative Conference.

== Biography ==
In 1998, Zhang worked for CNTV after graduating college where he began reading web novels such as The First Intimate Contact. In 2003, Zhang became a contract writer for the Chinese web fiction website Qidian. In February 2004, Zhang debuted with Child of Light while working as a website engineer in a small IT company.

In 2005, Zhang released Mad God, The Kind Death God and I am the Sole Immortal, his most prolific year yet.

On December 30, 2013, Zhang established Tang Studio, the first web fiction studio in China.

In April 2016, Zhang established Xuanshi Tangmen Culture Media Co., Ltd.

=== Pseudonym ===
In March 2013, while on Day Day Up, Zhang explained that his pen name comes from him liking to add three teaspoons of sugar to his soya bean milk (糖加三勺) which Tang Jia San Shao (唐家三少) shares the pronunciation of.

In 2015, in Zhang's autobiographical novel For You, I'm Willing to Love the World, he says his pen name came from one of his four online chatting room usernames. In 2018, on the show The Reader, Zhang also gave the same explanation.

=== Marriage ===
Zhang Wei married his wife Li Mo in May 2007. In July 2018, in the postscript of Douluo Dalu 3: Legend of the Dragon King 28, Zhang stated Li was diagnosed with breast cancer in 2015. On September 11, 2018, Zhang announced Li had died. Later that week, he announced he would be taking a hiatus. In a Sina Weibo post, Alibaba announced they fired an editor and a writer for insulting Zhang's wife in a private messaging group.

=== Activities ===
In May 2018, Zhang was invited to participate in the 2018 Iqiyi World Conference Network Literature Summit Forum.

On November 26, 2020, Zhang joined the annual Tengyun Summit which explores the relationship between technology and culture.

He was a delegate in the Thirteenth National Committee of the Chinese People's Political Consultative Conference.

== Portfolio ==
Title	Year	Type	Note
Child of Light	2004	Fantasy	Also known as Son of Light
Mad God	2004-2005	Fantasy	
The Kind Death God	2005	Fantasy	
I am the Sole Immortal	2005-2006	Fantasy	Also known as Only I Shall Be Immortal
Space Speedstar Hen	2006	Fantasy	Also known as Space Speed Xing Hen
Magic Chef of Ice and Fire	2006-2007	Fantasy	
The Twelve Zodiac Guardian Gods	2007-2008	Fantasy	
Zither Emperor	2008	Fantasy	
Douluo Dalu	2008-2009	Fantasy	Also known as Soul Land
Wine God	2009-2010	Fantasy	
Heavenly Jewel Change	2010-2011	Fantasy	
Divine Throne	2011-2012	Fantasy	also known as throne of seal /shen yin wang zuo
The Unrivaled Tang Sect	2012-2014	Fantasy	Also known as Douluo Dalu 2: Peerless Tang Sect, Soul Land II: Peerless Tang Clan or Soul Land II: The Unrivaled Tang Sect
Skyfire Avenue	2014-2016	Fantasy	
Legend of the Divine Realm	2015	Fantasy	Also known as Douluo Dalu 2.5: Legend of the Divine Realm or Divinity Legends of Douluo Continent
The Legend of the Dragon King	2016-2018	Fantasy	Also known as Douluo Dalu 3: Legend of the Dragon King or Soul Land III: Legend of the Dragon King
For You, I'm Willing to Love the World	2016	Romance	Autobiographical novel One of City Love Trilogy Also known as For You, I'd Love the World or My Story for You Adapted into the iQIYI TV series My Story for You (2018)
The Big Enchanters	2017	Fantasy	
Embracing You Beyond Lies	2017	Romance	One of City Love Trilogy
Mysterious Seas and Lands of Wonder: The Matchless Pearl	2018-2019	Fantasy	Developing into multiple content formats including original drama, cartoon, film, game, anime and more by iQIYI
Tang Sect's Heroes' Biography	2018	Fantasy	Also known as Douluo Dalu 3.5 - Tang Sect's Heroes' Biography
Protecting You and Time	2018	Romance	
Ultimate Fighting	2018-2020	Fantasy	Also known as Soul Land IV: Ultimate Fighting
River Flows A Thousand Miles, Qin Chuan and Zhi Xia	2019	Romance	One of City Love Trilogy
Mysterious Seas and Lands of Wonder: The Sea Dragon Pearl	2019	Fantasy	
Mysterious Seas and Lands of Wonder: Netherworld Pearl	2020-	Fantasy	
Rebirth of Tang San	2020-2022	Fantasy	Also known as Soul Land 5: Rebirth of Tang San
冰雪恋熊猫	2021	Romance	Publicized the 2022 Beijing Winter Olympics
