= Chinese online literature =

Chinese literary works published online

Chinese online literature, also known as Chinese internet literature or Chinese web literature, refers to works of literature written in the Chinese language that are published and read directly on the internet. Originating in the 1980s, it has seen increasing development in the 21st century with the increase of mobile reading throughout the world, especially as the internet has become more accessible. Most Chinese internet literature has made use of the popularity of scrolling platforms and literature tends to be published in a serialized format, with this literature being known as webnovels or light novels.

== History ==
Academic Guobin Yang defined internet literature as "all web-based writings that are viewed as literature by their authors or readers." This is a more open definition than Western definitions of electronic literature, which require aesthetic use of digital media such as interactivity, multimodality or animation. According to academic Michel Hockx, Chinese internet literature either "in established literary genres or in innovative literary forms" is "written especially for publication in an interactive online context and meant to be read on screen."

=== Origins ===
In the late 1980s, Chinese-language contributions to the internet were primarily made by overseas Chinese scholars publishing research papers, overseas students, or general Chinese diaspora sending emails or newsletters, or making posts onto small forums onto the internet. After 1991, when the World Wide Web was established and publicly accessible, some online Chinese language magazines were developed overseas, such as China News Digest and Chinese Magazine (Hua Xia Wen Zhai 华夏文摘) which provided news on China-related topics and was run by Chinese and Chinese-Americans in the United States. During the early 1990s, the Chinese government began to develop the Internet further and open it up to its people, but it wasn't until the late 1990s that the Chinese internet userbase became established, leading to key developments in Chinese online literature.

Bulletin board systems (BBS) developed in China in 1994 and routinely featured boards for writing, sharing, and discussing literature. The earliest literature boards were on BBS forums including SMTH, BDWM, and YTHT.

The early stage of Chinese literature had major cross-border components, with significant exchange between China, Taiwan, and the United States.

Digital literature in Hong Kong began emerging in the mid-1990.

In 1997, the Chinese-based literary website Under The Banyan Tree (Rongshuxia 榕树下) was founded. The site was focused on online literature and was popularized by the online diary of Lu Youqing, a cancer patient who published entries until his death. Originally a platform for its founder's own writing, it began accepting submissions and attracted writers including Li Jie (Anni Baobei), Chen Wanning, and Lu Jinbo. By 1999, Under the Banyan Tree had hired Chen Cun as chief artistic officer and attracted major writers like Wang Anyi, Jia Pingwa, and Yu Hua to be the referees for its first Original Internet Literature Contest.

One of the most influential online Chinese-language works was The First Intimate Contact by Cai Zhiheng (pen name "Rowdy Tsai" Pi Zi Cai 痞子蔡) which was published to the internet via the Bulletin Board System (BBS) in Taiwan in 1998. As academic Jessica Imbach summarizes, the novel "captured the zeitgeist of the early internet age and spread like wildfire through BBS forums in Taiwan and China." The print version of the book quickly became a best-seller.

Other early developments of internet literature in China included the January 1999 Sina.com and China Business Times writing relay and a NetEase internet literature contest refereed by Wang Meng, Liu Xinwu, and Mo Yan.

By the 2000s, Chinese online literature was well established, and book publishers began to look to the internet to find new works and authors to publish.

In the mid-2000s, Hong Kong online literature practices reflected broader Hong Kong internet dynamics, including combining the use of Cantonese and English, non-standard use of written Chinese, and code-mixing.

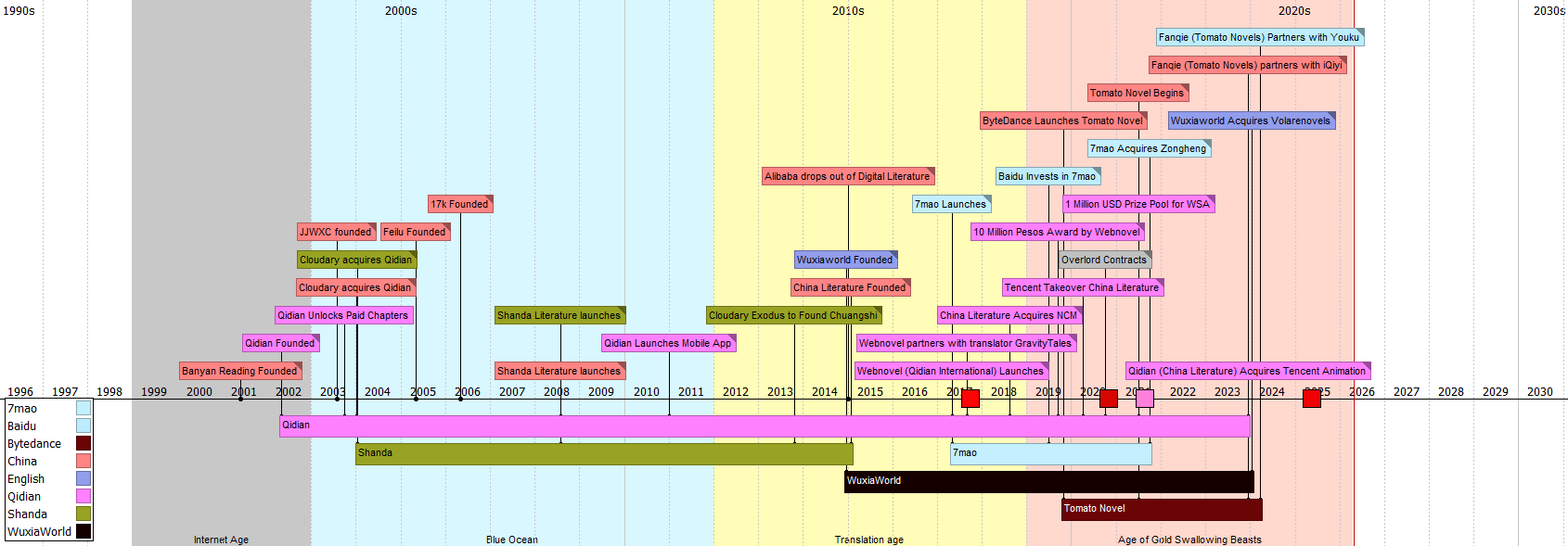
Timeline of Chinese online literature

=== Platforms and commercialization ===
The development of commercialized portal websites like Tianya in the early 2000s led to an increase in Chinese internet literature. Tianya hosted one of the early major original works of Chinese internet literature, Leave Me Alone: a Novel of Chengdu by Hao Qun (Murong Xuecun) which went viral and was published in print shortly thereafter.

While initially established as a platform for pirated Taiwanese novels, in 2003 Jinjiang Literature City began to host original works and has grown into one of the largest online literature platforms in China. At the peak of Under the Banyan Tree in 2005, the portal had 4.5 million registered users and received in excess of 5,000 daily submissions. Qidian literature network (起点, Starting Point) was launched in 2006, it quickly overtook Under The Banyan Tree in terms of a popular online literature site, as it focused on marketing strategies and reader engagement for its webnovels. Qidian was among the first to launch a freemium model, and was met with a lot of support and quickly grew popular.

In 2004, Shanda Interactive Entertainment acquired Qidian, and in 2008 acquired Hongxiu and Jinjiang Literature City to create Shanda Literature.

In the early 2010s, Tencent acquired its own online literature branch named Chuangshi Literature, which would eventually develop into Tencent Literature. In 2015 Shanda acquired Tencent Literature and they merged to for Yuewen Literature, also known as China Literature Limited. A website that was developed with the intention of fostering more experimental and artistic writing was Black and Blue (Heilan), which mostly functions as a series of forum posts.

Digital literature in Hong Kong experienced rapid growth after 2010. At that time, internet novels had highly variable quality and dealt with subject matter generally viewed as sensational, such as horror or pornography. Early online literature successes in Hong Kong included Siu Sing Lo's A Sweet Little Memoir (released in serialized format on HKGolden in 2010 and published by Steps Publications in hard copy the next year) and Cheung Sun's 18-Year-Old Nobi Nobita (also released in 2010 on HKGolden and published as a hard copy by Fung Lam Media in 2014). Hong Kong platforms like Shikoto (launched in 2013, aggregating variously-sourced Hong Kong internet novels) and Penana (launched in 2014 as a publication platform that also offered print on demand) developed. Overall, Hong Kong web literature platforms in the mid-2010s focused on a locally-oriented "indie" mindset, working with relatively new authors, unconventional distribution models, and publishing less mainstream subject matter.

More interactive works also appeared, including Shan Shui, a 2014 work of electronic literature by Chen Qian Xun that combined generated poems with images. Overseas Chinese writers have also published works of electronic literature.

During the 2014 antiprofanity campaign, online literature portals removed certain content deemed erotic, profane, and vulgar.

In 2015, the China Writers Association (CWA) established its Internet Literature Committee.

In 2015, Alibaba's Mobile Business Group formed Ali Literature to take part in the Chinese internet literature sector.

Some platforms have been devoted to poetry forums, such as Chinapoet and Poemlife, with users exchanging brief critiques and comments on each other's posts. Within popular poetry forums, there are also translation forums, where users dedicate themselves to the translation of poetry between Chinese and English.

Long genre fiction published in installments is the most significant component of the Chinese internet literature market. The pay-to-read model means that writers of long novels who can publish in daily installments can generally make more money than others of other online literary forms. Genre fiction is also amenable to adaptation into other media including television, film, games, and comics, which can attract broader audiences to these writers.

Online writing can be quite lucrative for some, and for many it serves as a true career. An example of a writer of online fiction who has received a lot compensation through his salary as well as royalties from adaptations of his works is Tang Jia San Shao, who has been known to earn millions of dollars each year. Even so, in the world of Chinese online literature, print authors or authors with more recognition are referred to as zuojia, whereas internet writers tend to refer to themselves as xieshou, however, as it relates to the more amateur or informal type of writing that they perceive themselves to write.

As of 2023, more than 36 million works of internet literature were available in China. As of June 2023, 528 million people in China (49% of China's internet users) read internet literature. A 2019 report by China Internet Network Information Center found that internet literature accounted for 9% of Chinese mobile internet users's time online, following only instant messaging, video services, and online music.

== Reader participation ==
For the majority of its development, Chinese online literature has been crucially tied to its user-generated economy which has allowed even amateur writers to share their works for free and have readers consume their content for free. With so much content being created under this model, many companies have sought to profit off of it and began the commercialization of online literature. Many platforms have turned to freemium models, allowing readers to access base content for free and upgrade to a subscription for more access or utilize pay-per-view models.

This has led readers of such content to feel quite entitled to the kind of content being produced, as they have financially invested in certain platforms and authors. Fandoms of webnovels try to influence writers and the direction of their stories with their feedback. Writers receive many kinds of feedback on the content they publish, including: view count, comments, rating of chapters, monetary gifts from readers, and recommendation tickets. Recommendation tickets are tokens that readers are allocated to reward to chapters they enjoyed and recommend the chapter to other readers on the platform. This can benefit writers as it can increase their visibility on the platform, and is often done in support of a particular author so that their work can be high ranking on the website. Not all platforms share this recommendation ticket feature, it is mostly available on Qidian and its international version, Webnovel, but most platforms have some sort of system to increase the visibility of certain works on the platform.

Since it is common for writers to abandon works after the first few chapters, readers attempt to keep a writer from quitting by showing a lot of support. This can be beneficial to writers but can also be a burden as readers that show a lot of support tend to feel entitled to controlling how often the writer publishes new chapters or even feel like they ought to control the ending of the story. This leads to many writers apologizing to their fanbase for missing an update or even producing multiple endings to satisfy both themselves as well as their audience. Since fanbases are very vocal about their opinions, many fanfic writers, they often hire beta writers in order to ensure the fanbase would like their content.

== Translation and global impact ==
As of 2017, at least 58 foreign websites which translated and distributed Chinese internet literature for non-Chinese language readers.

Wuxiaworld and Webnovel are popular online literature platforms among the global readership of genres such as Xuanhuan (玄幻 Fantasy) and Xianxia (仙侠 Chinese mythology fantasy).

Wuxiaworld primarily uses translators to translate content, but after Kakao Entertainment purchased Wuxiaworld in 2021, readers found that the platform became more expensive. Webnovel primarily utilizes machine translation, and many readers complain that it isn't very good, but there is a rise is original works written in English and other languages being published to the platform, which may contribute to its global appeal. Since the internet has evolved into its own ecosystem, housing many online communities, participation in user generated translation has contributed to a lot of the translation done across many platforms. Some online translation is done in a collaborative manner, with a like minded group of translators forming teams and collecting data and revising together to produce a translation.

Many times, online translation is done in an unofficial collaboration between volunteer translators and reader critics exchanging insights within forums. An example of this is the reader-translator interactions on the forum Shuhua by the translator Xiao Mao, who was conducting an online translation of Charlotte's Web into Chinese, which he went on to publish online in 2000. Readers interacted with sections he had translated and compared versions of translations as part of the process for the final translation to come about. An example of a webnovel platform dedicated to translation is Gravity Tales.

Besides human translation, by fans or experts, some will turn to neural machine translation (NMT) systems and language model AI tools like ChatGPT. Studies done on the translation of Chinese poetry have observed that NMT translations, by Google Translate for example, perform very poorly compared to expert translators or ChatGPT translations. ChatGPT performs far better than Google Translate at translating within the textual and historical context of the poetry due to the difference in which data they were trained in. ChatGPT shows significant creativity and accuracy in the way it translates as compared to Google translate, but human translation by experts still exhibit more artistry. There has been significant debate about the ethics of AI assisted translation, with people considering whether or not the translator should receive the credit for a translation produced with AI assistance, or whether or not AI assisted translation is a tool that should be promoted.

== Genres ==
As a result of its development among distinctive communities and the commercial branding that developed in online literature, mainland Chinese literature has highly formalized genre divisions. Examples include:

- Xianxia (仙侠 immortal warriors) is a Chinese fantasy genre that always includes Chinese cultural and Chinese mythology elements, such as Daoism and gods, magic, demons, magical items. The setting of these stories is primarily in ancient China or Chinese inspired fantastical realms. Many of the webnovels in this genre are written within the subgenre of Cultivation fiction.
- Xuanhuan (玄幻 typically translated as Eastern fantasy) is a Chinese fantasy genre that is rooted in but not limited to Chinese culture and mythology, often including foreign influence in current webnovels and are often set in a fantasy world, with the story including many Western fantasy elements. The coming-of-age story is a major characteristic of the genre.
- Qihuan (奇幻 magical) is a Chinese fantasy genre that truly blends eastern and Western fantasy elements. These are stories with fantasy elements that help drive the plot, but not fantasy elements that are the focus of the story.
- Wuxia (武侠 martial heroes) is a traditional genre focusing on characters with martial arts abilities, it is quite popular among webnovels. The Ming dynasty novel, Outlaws of the marsh (水滸傳), for example, which includes martial arts and a historical setting created a basis for the stories written today on popular webnovel platforms. Often a male protagonist is taught by a martial arts master and they become powerful and overcome their struggles. In contrast to Xianxia, a level of realism must be maintained, with fantasy elements being allotted to martial arts skills only.
- Cultivation is a Chinese fantasy subgenre that focuses on the main character overcoming struggles and becoming powerful, oftentimes immortal (仙 xian), in the end. The main character cultivates (progresses) themselves through training or magic. Cultivation contrasts western hero fantasy in that the main character is not gifted their powers, but works hard to train and earn them themselves. Cultivation can include, and often does, the cultivation of Qi(气).
- Danmei (耽美 boys' love) is a Chinese romance genre that focuses on the romantic relationships between male characters. These stories often have complex storylines, and there are many Chinese webnovels that contain a danmei story within the overarching story. It is one of the most popular genres of internet literature in China and is especially popular among female readers. Danmei writers are primarily urban Han women.
- Tongren (同人 same person) is the Chinese genre of fanfiction, which involves creating derivative works based on the exact original characters written by another author. An example of a webnovel that has inspired many tongren novels is the danmei novel Grandmaster of Demonic Cultivation by Mo Xiang Tong Xia.
- YY/Yiyin (意淫 mental masturbation) is the Chinese genre of pornographic literature.
- Kehuan (科幻 science fiction) is the Chinese genre of science fiction.

In online literature from Hong Kong, genre distinctions are less important and characterized by the comparatively more informal and less commercial-oriented practices of online literature.

== Notable works ==
=== Xianxia ===
Spirit Roaming by Xu Shengzhi was serialized on Qidian from 2006 to 2008. An example of the immortality cultivation subgenre, Spirit Roaming focuses on the protagonist's alchemical training experiences in an effort to achieve immortality. Xu asserts that the novel was written as an alchemy manual, hiding alchemical formulas in the novel's adventures.

Cultivation Chat Group by Legend of The Paladin: A modern day, real world student is added to a group chat of what he thinks to be fantasy role players. They share cultivation techniques, and as he attempts some he finds it to all be real. This webnovel is popular for its refreshing take on the Xianxia genre.

Coiling Dragon by I Eat Tomatoes: This is a long webnovel that focuses on the journey of Linley of the Baruch clan once famous for its Dragonblood warriors. The story is set in a magical world.

=== Chuanyue ===
Notable Chuanyue stories (tales in which the protagonist travels back in time or visits another world) include:

- Red Dawn. First published on the literature web portal Zongheng, Red Dawn depicts a contemporary man who travels back to 1905 where he begins a Communist revolution earlier in China, using Maoist ideology and strategies. The text is widely discussed and debated online via websites like Zhihu.
- Great Power Heavy Industry by Qi Cheng. The story depicts a contemporary man who travels back in time to 1980 to help China better develop its industries. It received several awards, including making the list of Themed Online Literary Works recognized by the National Press and Publication Administration and the China Writers Association for the celebration of the Seventieth Anniversary of the People's Republic of China.

=== Xuanhuan ===
Lord of Mysteries by Cuttlefish That Loves Diving (Yuan Ye)

=== Wuxia ===
Soul Land (aka Douluo Dalu) by Tang Jia San Shao (Zhang Wei)

=== Kehuan ===
Swallowed Star by I Eat Tomatoes

=== Danmei ===
While not all of the following works are strictly of the danmei genre, here are a few works that include danmei content:

Grandmaster of Demonic Cultivation(魔道祖师) by Mo Xiang Tong Xiu (墨香铜臭)

Guardian (镇魂) by Priest

A Tale of Jujube Valley ( 棗兒溝發家記)

Heaven Official's Blessing (天官赐福) by Mo Xiang Tong Xiu (墨香铜臭)

== Adaptations ==
Internet literature is a major component of original cultural intellectual property from China, and of the 309 most popular television dramas and films in 2018 and 2019, 21% were adapted from internet literature. Mythical fantasies are among the most popular IP sources for digital games.

Some famous webseries adaptations include:

- Guardian: based on the webnovel by Priest of the same name.
- The Untamed: based on the webnovel The Grandmaster of Demonic Cultivation by Mo Xiang Tong Xiu.
- Ghost Blows Out the Light by Tianxia Bachang (Zhang Muye) has been adapted into various media including Candle in the Tomb.

== Copyright ==
In the early 2010s Shengda Literature (aka Shanda Literature) struggled to fight the pirating of material from their platforms and has attempted to enforce copyrights on its content, but ultimately it remains difficult to regulate a user-generated economy within the internet. A popular site used for this sort of piracy is Baidu.

== Regulation ==
A 2004 antiprofanity campaign sought to curb online writing deemed too erotic or sexual.

In 2015, the State Administration of Press, Publication, Radio, Film, and Television (SAPPRFT) issued its Guiding Opinions Concerning the Healthy Development of Online Literature. The Guiding Opinions stated that online literature portals should "enhance online literation editorial staff management mechanisms; implement appointment qualification systems; establish and improve systems such as the real-name registration of writers, the responsible editor system, the publishing unit undersigning system, etc."

In 2017, SAPPRFT issued the Provisional Methods for Evaluating Social Benefits of Online Literature Publication Service Platforms, which proposed criteria to evaluate the social impact of literature portals in order to "improve the quality of published works, regulate the marker order, optimize the development environment, and guide internet literature publishers ... to constantly produce excellent works that organically integrate ideology, artistry, and readability, to better meet the people's spiritual and cultural needs."

=== Censorship ===
Online writers avoid censorship screening programs by writing characters with symbols mixed in, or otherwise rewriting a word in its pinyin form, to avoid automatic censorship. Whenever a detection avoidance technique is discovered by a moderator the program is updated to identify this, and so the writer must revise their work and attempt to republish again.
