= Lhasa Cinema City =

Movie theater in Lhasa, Tibet, China

Coordinates: 29.65233°N 91.12778°E

Lhasa Cinema City (Chinese: 拉萨电影城), is a movie theater in Lhasa, Tibet Autonomous Region, China.

== History ==
The cinema was built in 1984 and was originally called Lhasa Cinema (Chinese: 拉萨电影院). In October 2002, the Tibet Autonomous Region Cinema Company and Sichuan Zhufeng Weiye Investment Co., Ltd. cooperated to renovate Lhasa Cinema in the form of land-use right exchange, and the project was completed in 2004, and Lhasa Cinema was renamed Lhasa Cinema City. On April 22, 2005, Lhasa Cinema City was awarded the title of "Three-star Cinema" by the Star Rating Committee of the State Administration of Radio, Film, and Television.
