= Chen Cun =

Chinese novelist

Yang Yihua (杨遗华; born 1954), who writes under the pen name Chen Cun (陈村), is a Hui Chinese novelist known for his stories about the zhiqing experience during the Cultural Revolution. He is also one of the pioneers of electronic literature in China.

== Biography ==
Yang Yihua was born in Shanghai in 1954. His father, a Han Chinese factory worker, died a few months before the future writer was born. He was raised by his mother, at that time an active Hui Muslim, although she later abandoned the practice of Islam during the Cultural Revolution. The writer still identifies himself as a Hui, and a "half-Muslim," although he does not worship in any mosque either.

At the time of the Cultural Revolution, the intermediary school he was attending was closed and he was sent to work in a factory and then as an assistant barber. The school was then reopened, but after obtaining his certificate, he became part of the zhiqing experiment and in 1971 was sent to a rural area near Wuwei, Anhui, where he settled in a village called Chen Cun, whose name he will later adopt as a literary pseudonym.

He acquired some agricultural skills there, but also started writing short stories, although he did not find a magazine ready to publish them. In 1975, he was diagnosed with a degenerative rheumatic disease and sent back to Shanghai. He had to walk with crutches and was assigned to work in a factory with other handicapped people. After the Cultural Revolution, Shanghai Normal University opened again in 1977, and he enrolled in a course of Political Education. His condition, however, worsened and he tried to commit suicide in 1978, although he later learned to live with his illness and found solace in creative writing.

He graduated in 1980 and started working as a teacher, but in 1983 the success of his short stories published under the pen name Chen Cun persuaded him that he could be a full-time writer, a position he has maintained with the support of the Shanghai Writers Association.

== Zhiqing tales ==
His zhiqing experience is at the center of a significant part of Chen Cun's production. His approach was original with respect to both the scar literature denouncing the horrors of the Cultural Revolution and the Maoist propaganda praising its good intentions. Chen Cun exhibited a "love-hate" relationship both with the policies of the Chinese Communist Party and the zhiqing experiment.

In 1980, with I Have Lived There Before (我曾经在这里生活), Chen Cun produced one of the first tales where a student after the Cultural Revolution comes back to visit the village where he used to work as a zhiqing, a theme that many other writers of the same generation will also address in the following years. The narrator, a student, remembers when he was sent to a small village from Shanghai with another five zhiqing, including his friend Dashu and a beautiful girl called Xiaowen. Both the narrator, Maomao, and Dashu fall in love with Xiaowen, and a rivalry develops. Xiaowen prefers Maomao, but he is diagnosed with cancer and sent back to Shanghai. Six years later, with his health improved, Maomao travels back to the village and discovers that Xiaowen has married Dashu and they have a four-year-old daughter. Maomao is angry at Dashu until the child tells him that his mother is dead, drowned in a river. At this stage, nostalgia and compassion replace anger.

There are autobiographical references in I Have Lived There Before, as well as in The Past (从前), a novel Chen Cun wrote in 1983 and published in 1985 about a young man who comes to understand that, for all its repressive and unpleasant features, being compelled to become a zhiqing helped him to come of age. In another novel also written in 1983, but published in 1986, Day Students (住读生), and in the award-winning 1986 short story Death (死), Chen Cun came closer to the scar literature. In Day Students, he denounced the fanaticism of these former zhiqing that still exalted and practiced the violence of the Cultural Revolution after it had long ended. In Death, he portrayed the last days of his mentor, Shanghai intellectual and translator from French Fu Lei, who committed suicide together with his wife at the beginning of the Cultural Revolution.

== Internet literature ==
In the 1990s, Chen Cun identified more and more with the avant-garde experimenting with new uses of the language, including by following ordinary Chinese and telling in great details the routines of their daily lives. By the end of the decade, he had reached the conclusion that the Internet offered to the avant-garde a unique opportunity to experiment with the language, with a freedom impossible in printed books that need approval from editors and publishers.

From 1999 on, he produced mostly Web fiction and was even hailed as "the godfather" of web literature in China.

From 1999 to 2002, he worked as the chief artistic officer for literature website Under the Banyan Tree, and had Wang Anyi, Jia Pingwa, and Yu Hua serve as referees for the website's first original internet literature contest.

By the second decade of the 21st century he started being less optimistic about the Internet, and suggested that with the overload of information there the heydays of electronic literature may have passed.
