= Radio in China =

There are over 3,000 radio stations in the People's Republic of China. China National Radio, the nation's official radio station, has eight channels, and broadcasts for a total of over 200 hours per day via satellite. Every province, autonomous region and municipality has local broadcasting stations. China Radio International (CRI), the only national overseas broadcasting station, is beamed to all parts of the world in multiple languages.

Radio technology first arrived in China in the winter of 1922-1923. With radios expensive and reception weak, the early popularity of radio developed primarily among wealthy Chinese and foreigners in the major port cities like Shanghai. Radio's popularity grew during the Nanjing decade as prices dropped and broadcast quality improved. Cultural practices of radio listening were communal, with shops placing speakers facing the street and families pooling funds to buy radios for places like temples and schools.

In the People's Republic of China, mass listening campaigns of the 1950s sought to bring political news and other radio programming throughout China. The PRC established a network of "radio receptionists" in schools, army units, and factories. Radio receptionists would organise group listening activities, transcribe news on blackboards, and re-broadcast news using homemade megaphones. In the later 1950s, wired broadcasting expanded substantially in China. Wireless radio became widespread over the course of the 1960s and 1970s.

== History of radio broadcasting ==
=== Republic of China ===
Radio technology first arrived in China in the winter of 1922-1923. At the time, mass media in China was slow or non-existent in many areas, and much of the population was illiterate. Radios were expensive and reception was weak. Its early popularity developed primarily among wealthy Chinese and foreigners in major port cities like Shanghai.

Through its influence in the China Maritime Customs Service from 1922-1925, the Zhili Clique attempted to ban radio importation. The weakness of the Zhili Clique's government and the disagreement by the foreigners who controlled the Customs Service meant that the ban was easily circumvented. Illegality combined with widespread acceptance also lead to the rise of counterfeit manufacturing.

Warlord Zhang Zuolin's forces brought captured radio equipment and expertise back to the northeast after their defeat in the First Zili-Fengtian War. This became the basis for the radio industry in Manchuria and Zhang's administration built two of the most powerful and largest radio transmitters in Asia. Zhang became the patron of China's first government broadcasting. The northeast's emphasis on radio included using it for education and propaganda as part of domestic competition with the Kuomintang and with more technologically advanced states like Japan, the Soviet Union, and Britain.

After the 1924 Beijing coup, the influence of Zhang resulted in the central government Communications Ministry taking a more positive stance on radio and encouraging the public's use of radio.

Zhang's administration consolidated control of north China after victory in the Anti-Fengtian War, after which it began drafting radio regulations patterned on Britain's 1924 radio bylaws.

Radio's popularity grew during the Nanjing decade as radio prices dropped and the quality of broadcasting improved. Practices of radio listening in China were primarily communal, with shops in urban areas installing radios and loud speakers and eventually spread to smaller cities where families pooled funds to buy radios and place them at temples or schools. In the 1930s, radio technology began reaching small towns in China's interior.

The Republic of China established The Nationalist Government Radio Station in 1928; it was a major mechanism for disseminating ROC propaganda messages. The ROC also established a program to place listening stations in rural counties where radio monitors would listen to news and propaganda broadcasts to transcribe news items for printing in local newspapers and posting on public walls or blackboards. At the beginning of this program, the primary focus of radio monitors was to promote the KMT by using the broadcasts to shape local newspaper coverage. Initially covering ten major cities, the program later grew; when it shut down in 1935, there was approximately one radio monitor for about a quarter of China's counties, although these were not evenly distributed; wealthier counties had more radio monitors.

In 1937, Shanghai had more radio stations than any other city, globally.

=== People's Republic of China ===
In December 1949, the PRC established the Central Broadcasting Station. In 1950, approximately 1 million radio sets existed in China, mostly in bourgeois urban households.

Organized mass listening campaigns developed throughout the 1950s, bringing political news and other programming to an unprecedently large audience in China.

The People's Republic of China began establishing a radio reception network assigning "radio receptionists" in schools, army units, and factories. These receptionists organized group listening sessions and also transcribed and distributed written content of radio broadcasts. Through the practice of rooftop broadcasting, village criers using homemade megaphones would also relay the content of radio broadcasts. Radio receptionists and rooftop broadcasting remained a significant component of broadcasting practices until wireless broadcasting became widespread in the 1960s and 1970s.

In April 1950, the Central Broadcasting Station's international department (branded as Radio Beijing) began broadcasting for listeners in Vietnam, Thailand, Burma, Indonesia, and in four dialects for overseas Chinese throughout East Asia.

Beginning in 1956, wired broadcasting (through which hundreds or thousands of loudspeakers were connected via wire to a centrally located broadcasting post) expanded. Radio networks grew along with rural collectives in the late 1950s. By 1959, 9,435 communes and 1,689 counties had wired relay stations, and these linked 4,570,000 wired loudspeakers.

In 1978, China stopped jamming broadcasts from Voice of America (VOA). VOA opened a bureau in Beijing in 1981. In 1982, Radio Peking and VOA began regular exchanges.

In 1998, the State Administration of Radio, Film, and Television (SARFT) began the Connecting Every Village with Radio and TV Project, which extended radio and television broadcasting to every village in China.

== Radio manufacturing ==
In the 1950s and 1960s, Red Star Radios became one of the Four Big Things, important and desirable consumer goods that demonstrated an increase in Chinese standards of living.

Radio manufacturing expanded significantly during China's Third Front campaign to develop basic industry and national defense industry in China's rugged interior in case of invasion by the Soviet Union or the United States. In the Third Front regions, radio manufacturing increased by 11,668% percent as a result of the campaign.

By the Cultural Revolution, battery-powered transistor radios, microphones, mobile public address systems, and loudspeakers had penetrated even remote areas.

== See also ==
- Mass media in China
- Media history of China
- List of Chinese-language radio stations
