= Sent-down youth =

Educated youths working in rural China during Cultural Revolution

Chinese names

Educated Youth
- Simplified Chinese: 知识青年
- Traditional Chinese: 知識青年
- Literal meaning: intellectual youth
Transcriptions
Standard Mandarin
- Hanyu Pinyin: zhīshi qīngnián

Zhiqing
- Chinese: 知青
- Literal meaning: [contraction]
Transcriptions
Standard Mandarin
- Hanyu Pinyin: zhīqīng

Sent-down Youth
- Chinese: 下放青年
- Literal meaning: transferred-down youth
Transcriptions
Standard Mandarin
- Hanyu Pinyin: xiàfàng qīngnián

Sent-down, rusticated, or educated youth (Chinese: 下乡青年), also known as the zhiqing, were young people who left the urban districts of the People's Republic of China (willingly or under coercion) to live and work in rural areas as part of the Down to the Countryside Movement from the 1950s to the end of the Cultural Revolution. Most young people who went to the rural communities had received a primary- or secondary-school education, and only a small minority had reached the post-secondary (or university) level.

== Prelude (1953–1967) ==
In the years immediately following the founding of the People's Republic of China (PRC), the Chinese Communist Party's (CCP) central leadership largely promoted primary education. From 1949 to 1952, the number of elementary schools increased by 50 percent; student enrollment more than doubled, from 23,490,000 to 51,100,000. Although the number of middle-school students increased by 140 percent over the same period, elementary-school students outnumbered their middle-school counterparts twenty to one. In response to the severe disproportion between the numbers of elementary and middle-school students and the overheated development of primary education in the early 1950s (especially in rural areas), the Ministry of Education made sweeping cuts in elementary and middle-school admissions in 1953. This policy had a large impact on elementary and middle-school graduates and educated youths; over two million could not go on to higher education in the same year.

=== Rural educated youth ===
Rural educated youths were the worst affected. The CCP initiated the First Five-Year Plan (1953–1957) in 1953, following the Soviet-style development of heavy industry in urban areas. The Stalinist model required the PRC to develop more efficient ways to extract resources from agriculture to subsidize industrialization. The CCP's central leadership introduced centralized requisition for grain from villages and rationing in cities, better known as the "unified purchasing and selling of grain" system or Tongguo tongxiao. The system required peasants to sell "surplus" grain to the state at a fixed low price while providing city residents with guaranteed rations, which widened the gap between urban and rural China.

Because of the urban-rural gap, many educated youths considered going on to higher education (and acquiring a job in the city) as the primary way out of the countryside and the peasantry. A rural youth wrote to his elder brother in 1955, "I failed (to go on to higher education) ... I could not calm down, because it mattered to my youth, even to my life ... I would rather make a living by picking up trash in the city than stay in the countryside!"

Some rural educated youth turned to working opportunities in cities. However, the PRC's gradual nationalization of the state's private sector, the reform of handicraft in cities (and the reform of agriculture, known collectively as the "Three Socialist Reforms" (Chinese: 三大社会主义改造; pinyin: sān dà shèhuì zhǔyì gǎizào; 1953–1956), and the accumulation of workers during the First Five-Year Plan left a large unemployed population in cities. The PRC's urgent, open-ended need for as many peasants (food producers, with more "surplus" grain to be extracted) and as few consumers (city residents) as possible made rural educated youth's countryside-to-city movement unfavorable to policymakers.

The CCP's central leadership institutionalized the two-tiered household registration (the hukou system) in 1958. Initially designed as a surveillance tool for police to monitor the population to prevent counterrevolutionary sabotage in the early 1950s, the post-1958 hukou system assigned every individual in China a rural (agricultural) or urban (non-agricultural) registration by residence. The classification system aimed to fix everyone in place. While city residents (individuals with an urban or non-agricultural hukou) were entitled to guaranteed food rations, housing, health care and education, rural (agricultural) households were bound by control of their physical mobility and were expected to be self-sufficient. The 1953 reform of primary education permanently ended most rural, educated youth opportunities for upward social mobility.

== Experiences ==
In the face of pressure from educated youth who could not go on to higher education and mass un-enrollment in cities, the CCP's central leadership saw redirecting rural educated youth to return to their place of origin as reasonable. On December 3, 1953, the People's Daily proposed a plan to organize educated youth to participate in agricultural production in the outskirts of cities and towns and in rural areas. This editorial originated the Up to the Mountains and Down to the Countryside Movement (Chinese: 上山下乡运动; pinyin: shàngshān xià xiāng yùndòng). By late 1954, Liaoning, Jilin, Shaanxi, Qinghai, and Gansu provinces organized about 240,000 educated youths to participate in agricultural production, most of which came from rural areas.

Participation in agricultural production meant more than cultivating land, growing crops, and related manual labor. As part of the "Three Socialist Reforms", the PRC's 1950s agricultural collectivization campaign merged individual peasant households into agricultural producers' cooperatives (Chinese: 农村合作社; pinyin: nóngcūn hézuòshè), better known as the three-tiered, rural production unit (people's commune, production brigade, and production team after 1958) for collective production and distribution in the countryside. All adult members would receive work points (Chinese: 公分; pinyin: gōngfēn) for the amount of labor they provided the cooperative, measured by working hours. At the end of each year, agricultural producers' cooperatives paid members with a proportion of the harvest and cash from grain sold to the state according to work points, age, and sex. The large-scale 1950s agricultural collectivization in China's countryside created a high demand for educated individuals with some mathematical training to be collective accountants and work-point recorders. In 1955, Mao Zedong praised 32 rural educated youths who returned to the countryside to work for local agricultural producers' cooperatives: "All educated youths like them (those of rural origins) who could work in the countryside ought to be happy to do so. The countryside is a vast world where much can be accomplished."

Redirecting rural youth to return to their place of origin relieved, but never resolved, the number of elementary and middle-school graduates who could neither go on to higher education nor find work in cities. By 1955, Shanghai had over 300,000 unemployed educated youths. Inspired by the Soviet Virgin Lands Campaign, the Communist Youth League of China (CYLC) organized model youth volunteer pioneer teams (Chinese: 青年志愿垦荒队; pinyin: qīngnián zhìyuàn kěnhuāng duì) in 1955 to establish the Chinese version of Komsomolsk in remote, mountainous regions and borderlands. A youth volunteer pioneer team usually consisted of dozens to hundreds of youths which included a small number of urban and rural educated youths and urban workers, and primarily young peasants from the outskirts of cities and towns; most of them were CYLC members. In 1956, about 210,000 youths participated in the Chinese Virgin Lands Campaign. Compared to urban youths, the CCP's central leadership and local cadres responsible for organizing youth volunteer pioneer teams considered rural youth in general as more experienced in agricultural production and stronger.

Another underrepresented subgroup of educated youths was the border-support youth (Chinese: 支边青年; pinyin: zhībiān qīngnián): male and female party cadres, young peasants, workers, technicians, veterans, and educated youths, primarily from rural areas. Instead of returning to their places of origin in the countryside, these rural educated youths were organized (dongyuan) to go to borderlands "go up to mountains", Chinese: 上山; pinyin: shàngshān). Rural educated youths were 18.6 percent of all border-support youth who arrived at Xinjiang in 1961, and 17.5 percent in 1962. Unlike the self-funded return journeys of rural educated youths and the CYLC-organized youth volunteer pioneer teams which depended on their members' personal (or family) funding and public donations, border-support youth relied on central (such as transportation, clothes, meal allowance en route, and medical aid) and local government funding for resettlement. In 1959 and 1960, the national treasury appropriated over 200 million yuan for the resettlement of border-support youth.

Throughout the 1950s, the Up to Mountains and Down to the Countryside Movement was largely intermittent and closely correlated with the ups and downs of the PRC's economy and admission policies. Educated youths who had gone to the countryside would return to cities when employment and admission opportunities increased, and fresh graduates would remain in cities. The industrial over-expansion during the Great Leap Forward (GLF) added over 20 million jobs in cities in 1958. Since settling in cities when possible has been the most-desired option (providing a promising future), tens of millions of youths moved – or returned – to cities.

The unprecedented large-scale redundancy and decline in school admission generated a severe population issue in post-GLF PRC cities. From late 1962 to early 1963, the CCP institutionalized an educated-youth resettlement policy and established a central resettlement group (Chinese: 中央安置领导小组; pinyin: zhōngyāng ānzhì lǐngdǎo xiǎozǔ) to oversee the campaign. In a meeting from June to July 1963, Zhou Enlai demanded that each province, city and autonomous region make a fifteen-year resettlement plan (1964–1979) for urban educated youths. An August 19, 1963, central resettlement group report explained the reasoning behind Zhou's proposed 15-year time span: "Children born within fourteen years after the Liberation (1949–1963) would reach working-age in the next fifteen years ... It was estimated that there would be around a million middle school graduates who could not go on to higher education every year ... For this reason, the party's central leadership demand that each province, city and autonomous region make a fifteen-year plan (1964–1979) that is centered on the resettlement of urban educated youths who reached working age." In an October meeting, Zhou increased the number of rural and urban educated youths to be resettled to the countryside in the next eighteen years to 35 million. He warned that the number would increase further if birth-control measures in cities were poorly implemented. Zhou did not mention rural educated youth in particular, indicating that the CCP's central leadership expected to continue redirecting most rural elementary and middle-school graduates to return to their places of origin.

Among major literary genres during the Cultural Revolution were novels about the experiences of sent-down youth. They included novels written by the youths themselves, such as Zhang Kangkang's Dividing Line (1975) and Zhang Changgong's Youth (1973).

=== Resettlement and inequality ===
Following the model of resettling border-support youths in the late 1950s and early 1960s, the PRC gave each resettled educated youth an allowance to cover their resettlement expenses – including transportation, home-building, food, farming tools, and furniture – in the transitional period between their departure and their first "paycheck" after arrival (usually at the end of each year). Urban educated youth who resettled on state-owned farms – agricultural farms (农场; nóngchǎng), tree plantations (林场; línchǎng) or fish farms (渔场; yúchǎng, known collectively as 插场; chā chǎng) – received an average of ¥883, ¥1,081 and ¥1,383, respectively, in 1964; the average resettlement allowance for those who resettled on collectively-owned production teams (生产队; shēngchǎn duì, known as 插队; chāduì), was one-fifth of chā chǎng (around ¥200). The allowance also varied by location (¥225 in northern China and ¥185 in southern China in 1964, and ¥250 and ¥230 in 1965) and the distance between departure and destination; those who resettled in another province (跨省安置; kuà shěng ānzhì) would receive an extra ¥20 for transportation. Rural educated youth received ¥50 for their return journey to the countryside.

Urban-educated youth preferred state-owned farms or chā chǎng over collectively-owned production teams or chāduì. Those who resettled on state-owned farms had a higher resettlement allowance and received salary-based monthly payments from central and local financial allocations, considered better than the production teams' end-of-year distribution system; the latter income varied with the local situation and annual harvest. State-owned farm employees considered themselves to have a higher political status than production-team members and peasants. The perceived gaps between workers and peasants, urban and rural areas, and manual and mental labor (later known collectively as the "Three Difference" or 三大差别; sān dà chābié) persisted, impacting decisions or reactions to PRC policies. A primary propaganda slogan adopted by the CCP's central leadership to promote the Up to Mountains and Down to the Countryside Movement during the Cultural Revolution was to eliminate the Three Differences. Another form of cha chang, resettling in the Production and Construction Corps (生产建设兵团; shēngchǎn jiànshè bīngtuán) as soldiers in borderlands, became popular among urban-educated youth because being a soldier was considered to have a better political future (zhengzhi qiantu). However, the PRC sent 870,000 of 1,290,000 urban-educated youth (67 percent) resettled from 1962 to 1966 to production teams due to financial concerns. Over 8.7 million rural-educated youth returned to the countryside during the same period.

== Return home or exile ==
On May 16, 1966, an expanded session of a CCP Politburo meeting approved Mao Zedong's agenda and political declaration of the Cultural Revolution, later known as the 16 May Notification. In August, Mao met with over a million Red Guards from across the country who gathered in and around Tiananmen Square. Envisioning a nationwide revolution, the party's leadership announced in September that the state would provide all revolutionary students and faculty a free ride to Beijing and living expenses en route. Benefiting from their location and connections, Beijing- and Tianjin- (urban) educated youths who resettled in production teams on the outskirts of major cities were among the first to be informed.

As the news spread, more sent-down or urban-educated youths followed. Some responded to the party leadership's call and united (串联; chuànlián) to "revolt" (造反; zàofǎn) and "return to cities to make revolution" (Chinese: 回城闹革命; pinyin: huíchéng nào gémìng). Meanwhile, many also chose to return to cities because they’d had conflicts with local cadres and peasants. Some urban-educated youths with "good" political or family backgrounds (zhengzhi beijing) considered themselves more "revolutionary" than local cadres, and demanded that the latter resign during the 1963–1965 Socialist Education Movement. When the Cultural Revolution began, local cadres launched counterattacks and forced resettled urban-educated youth to leave.

Others experienced discrimination by local cadres and peasants. Several female urban-educated youths who resettled on production teams in Inner Mongolia reported in 1965 that they were prohibited from contacting local "poor and lower-middle class peasants" (Chinese: 贫下中农; pinyin: pínxià zhōngnóng) due to their "bad" family backgrounds. Even those not in the "Five Black Categories" (Chinese: 黑五类; pinyin: hēiwǔlèi) were subjected to bias and abuses. A production brigade in Zengcheng, Guangzhou prohibited all urban-educated youth and "bad elements" (Chinese: 坏分子; pinyin: huài fēnzǐ) of the Five Black Categories from participating in mass gatherings. Shanghai sent-down youth who resettled in the province of Anhui were expelled and repatriated to Shanghai by the Huangshan tea and tree plantation as a result of a local class-struggle campaign. Some Shanghai sent-down youths who resettled at the Xinjiang Production and Construction Corps reported abuses by local cadres. In some cases, the sent-down youths had to do heavy work in a harsh environment without pay. Abuse of female sent-down youth was worse; some Production and Construction Corps cadres said that "[marriages of female sent-down youths] were only open to members of the Production and Construction Corps" (Chinese: 兵团姑娘对内不对外; pinyin: bīngtuán gūniáng duì nèi bù duìwài). In the face of harsh living and working conditions and threats to personal safety, the Shanghai sent-down youths returned home. A considerable number of urban-educated youths, especially recent arrivals to the countryside, took advantage of a free ride back to the city. Urban-educated youths had more enthusiasm and ability to return to cities than their rural counterparts; they had families (or other supporters) in cities, and were more likely to have a secure livelihood after their return.

Most local state-owned farms and production and construction corps and production teams rarely attempted to prevent urban-educated youths from returning to cities. Most local cadres supported these return journeys and provided supplies, an allowance, or accommodations en route. Cadres in the autonomous region of Guangxi proposed to provide every revolutionary student or faculty, sent-down youth and cadre who participated in the "great networking" a monthly allowance of ¥7 and 45 grain coupons (粮票; liáng piào). An urban-educated youth who resettled in Bayan County, Heilongjiang province recalled that "capitalist roaders" (走资派; zǒuzī pài) encouraged sent-down youth to return to cities and gave each one ¥300 to cover expenses en route. Most cadres at the Xinjiang Production and Construction Corps supported the "great networking" in late 1966, after attempts to prevent urban-educated youth from returning to cities (by setting up checkpoints on main roads) failed.

The "great networking" soon escaped the party leadership's control. It was announced in November 1966 that after 21 November, revolutionary students and faculty would receive a free ride only if they were taking a return trip. The following month, the party's central leadership demanded that all revolutionary students and faculty return home by December 20. By the end of 1966, nearly all educated youth from Shanghai, 70 percent of those from Nanjing, and 90 percent of those from Chengdu returned to cities from the countryside.

=== Protests ===
Returned urban-educated youths formed local and inter-regional "rebel" organizations, protested about abuses of educated youth, and demanded that local governments reclaim their non-agricultural welfare. "Rebel" organization leaders were aware of the danger of challenging the Up to the Mountains and Down to the Countryside movement. Returned sent-down youths tactfully attributed the movement to Liu Shaoqi, who was called a "traitor" and a "capitalist roader" and removed from office as a result of Mao Zedong's attack on him in Bombard the Headquarters-My Big-Character Poster on August 5, 1966.

In 1957, the party's central leadership entrusted Liu Shaoqi to promote the Up to the Mountains and Down to the Countryside movement in Hebei, Henan, Hubei, Hunan and Shandong provinces. In a series of talks, Liu admitted that the state faced temporary urban unemployment and admissions problems and encouraged urban- and rural-educated youth who could not go on to higher education to participate in agricultural production and become the first generation of educated "new peasants" (新式农民; xīnshì nóngmín). Liu addressed most educated youths' biggest concern (the future), and promised that educated "new peasants" would have promising lives. According to Liu, educated "new peasants" could earn local peasants' trust by learning agricultural skills from them. Trusted by the local population for their personalities and abilities, Liu concluded that educated "new peasants" could become local cadres several years after their arrival in the countryside and said that the state would also need educated "new peasants" to promote rural development in the near future.

Liu Shaoqi's interpretations of the Up to Mountains and Down to the Countryside movement in 1957 were consistent with the party central leadership's aim to resolve urban unemployment and admissions problems and accelerate rural development. The movement generated massive discontent and social unrest, however, and the demoted Liu became a safe target for the dissatisfaction of returned urban-educated youth. Returned urban-educated youths and their parents gathered in cities which included Guangzhou, Changsha, Wuhan and Shanghai to protest against Liu Shaoqi and his "black talons and teeth" (黑爪呀; hēi zhǎoya) abuses. Some "rebel" organizations enlisted members to go back to the countryside to lead local protests against the Up to Mountains and Down to the Countryside movement. Shanghai-educated youth's parents sent a delegation to the Xinjiang Production and Construction Corps to organize protests. Rural-educated youth swarmed into cities, demanding for jobs and the elimination of the urban-rural gap.

=== Return to the "hometown" ===
In January 1967, a Japanese newspaper reported the development of a nationwide "rebel" movement. Several days later, on 11 January, the party's central leadership made its first announcement about the return of educated youths since the beginning of the Cultural Revolution. According to the announcement, "capitalist roaders" in the CCP instigated the return of educated youth to cities and their protests. The party's central leadership ordered all formerly-resettled educated youth to return to the countryside and continue participating in agricultural production. An 18 January editorial on said that the return of formerly-resettled educated youth was a "capitalist roader" conspiracy to undermine the country's agricultural production and expand the urban-rural gap. The editorial, which quoted Mao Zedong's 1955 comment about the Up to Mountains and Down to the Countryside movement justify it, encouraged urban-educated youth to "return to [your] hometown (the countryside) and make revolution locally" (Chinese: 打回老家去，就地鬧革命; pinyin: dǎ huílǎojiā qù, jiù dì nào gémìng). The editorial deliberately distorted the meaning of "hometown" (laojia); regardless of educated youth's place of origin, the party's central leadership now ordered them to go to the countryside. These official announcements further incited class struggle. The Up to the Mountains and Down to the Countryside movement, largely a part of the PRC's economic-development plan during the late 1950s and early 1960s, became a large-scale political movement during the Cultural Revolution.

== Cultural Revolution ==
=== Origins ===
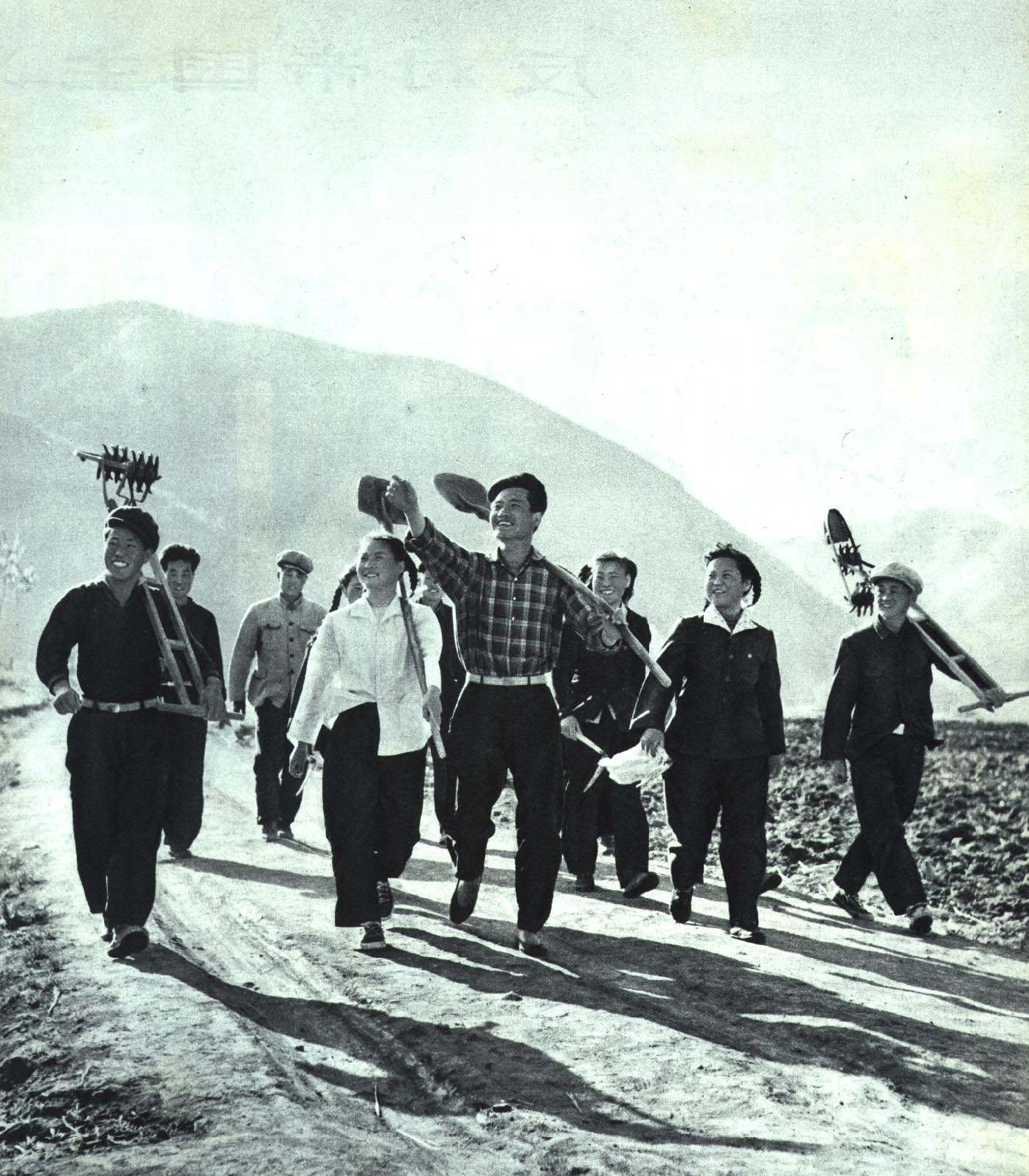
Sent-down youth

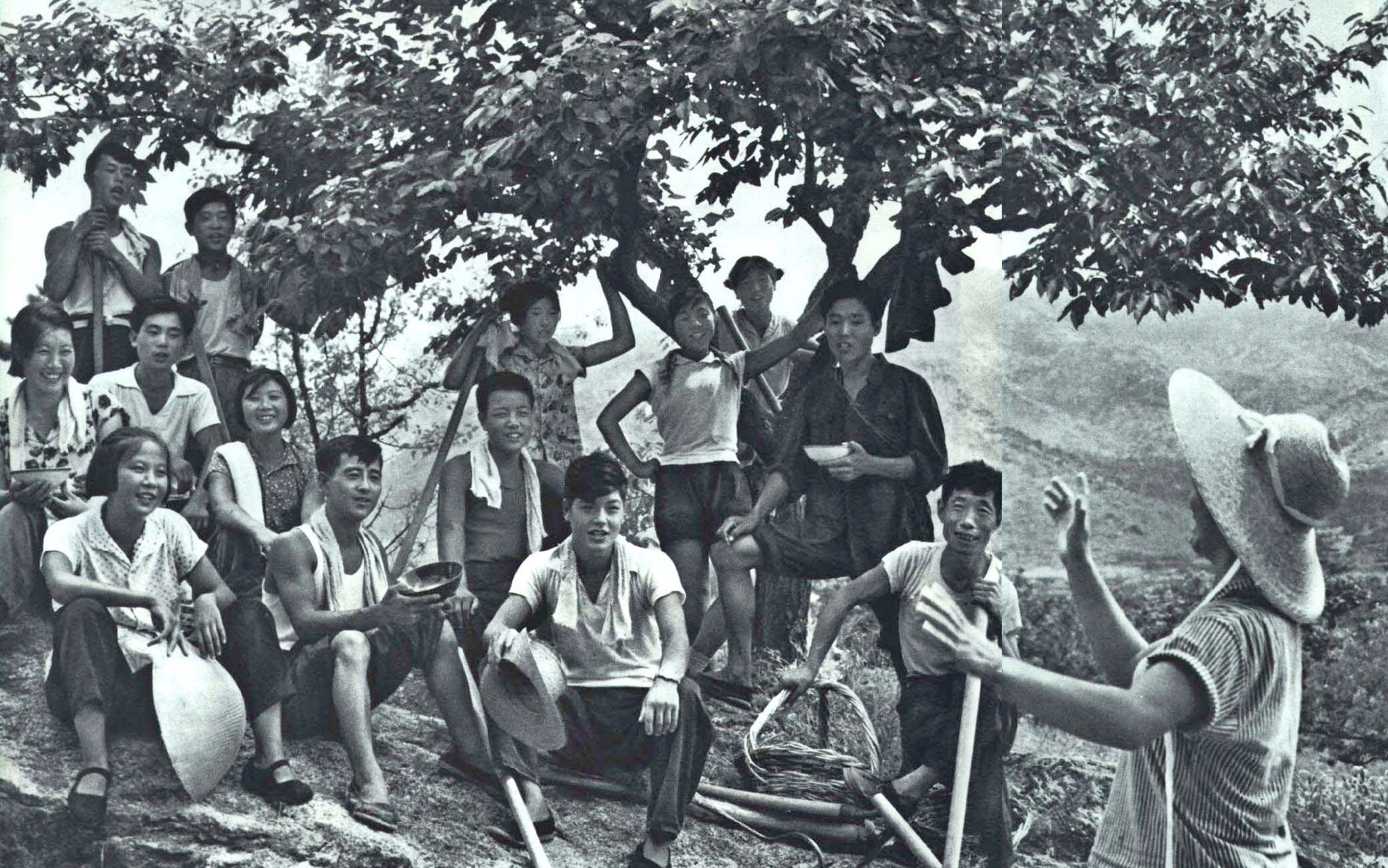
Sent-down youth in Changli County, Hebei

In early 1966, when the Cultural Revolution began, student Red Guards attacked China's educational system. On 6 June, dozens of seniors from the Beijing No.1 Girls' Middle School proposed the abolition of college-entrance exams. They denounced the "old educational system", which they saw as "encouraging bourgeois ideology" and "helping the restoration of capitalism". The students sent an open letter to Chairman Mao Zedong asking him to end the exams:

"High school graduates should go to the workers, peasants, and soldiers, to unite with the workers and farmers, and to grow in the wind and waves of the Three Revolutionary Movements ... This is a new road, a new road leading to communism. We must, and will certainly be able to, make our proletariat road. Dear Party, Beloved Chairman Mao, the harshest place needs to be dispatched the youth around Chairman Mao. We are ready to go and are just waiting for your order".

More students denounced the college-entrance exams and called for their abolition over the following days. The Chinese Communist Party's central leadership supported the students' proposal. In June, China's State Council announced the postponement of "higher educational institutions' work of recruiting new students". The State Council issued "The Announcement on Reforming Higher Educational Institutions' New Students Recruitment" on 24 July, canceling college-entrance exams.

Because of the student Red Guards' attacks on schools and the central government's approval, students who graduated in 1966 from middle school could not enter high school and those who graduated from high school could not go on to university. As the Cultural Revolution caused industrial and agricultural production to plunge, jobs available to these students were few. The number of students who graduated from middle or high school but could not enter a higher educational institution reached 10 million in 1968. Students who graduated from middle or high school in 1966, 1967, and 1968 were known as lao sanjie ("old three-classes" 老三届).

Two major political events during the Cultural Revolution marked the lives of lao sanjie: the Red Guards movement and the Down to the Countryside Movement. Many student Red Guards, realizing that they could not go on to study at universities, became passionate about exploring new opportunities to "unite with the workers and farmers" (与工农相结合) in the second of half of 1966. The idea of joining workers and farmers was taught extensively at schools, and the lao sanjie were familiar with it. Many middle schools had begun to organize students to work in the countryside for part of each semester since 1965, and government propaganda praised youth who labored in the fields. As a result, many lao sanjie initially went to the countryside voluntarily and enthusiastically.

Ten students from Beijing No. 25 High School left the city for Inner Mongolia in 1967. On October 9, before their departure, thousands of people gathered in the Tiananmen Square to send them off. In front of a large portrait of Chairman Mao, the students pledged their allegiance:

"For the great cause to redden the world with Mao Zedong thoughts, we are willing to climb the mountains of sword and go down to the sea of fire. We have taken the first step in accordance with your great instruction, that the intellectuals should unite with the workers and farmers. We will continue walking on this revolutionary path, walking to its end and never turning back."

State media which included People's Daily and Beijing Daily reported the students' departure from Beijing to Inner Mongolia extensively and approvingly, and the event began the Down to the Countryside Movement.

=== Voluntary, then mandatory ===
Many youths joined the movement enthusiastically; many only joined because they were required to.

The initial phase of the Down to the Countryside Movement, marked by the October 1967 departure of students from Beijing No. 25 High School, was voluntary. In August 1968, forty-five students from Shanghai were the city's first voluntary delegation to leave for the countryside. The Shanghai government arranged a reception for the students, called "our city's little soldiers" by Jiefang Daily, on the morning of their departure. The municipal government applauded the students' choice, told them to continue learning from Mao's works, to study from the peasants and participate in the class struggle.

The number of students who volunteered to go to the countryside was far smaller, however, than the number of graduates who could neither continue their studies nor find a job. In Beijing, the number of lao sanjie was more than 400,000; until April 1968, only a few thousand of them volunteered to go to the countryside.

From late 1967 to spring 1968, other municipal and provincial government offices began encouraging and organizing students to go to the countryside. On December 12, 1967, the municipal government of Qingdao in Shandong province organized a farewell ceremony to send off the city's first batch of students to the countryside. Less than a month later, on January 4, 1968, the Shandong provincial revolutionary committee held a meeting at which it was requested that all educated youth in the cities go to the countryside. In March, the Heilongjiang provincial revolutionary committee published an announcement prioritizing the sending of graduates to the countryside.

On April 4, 1968, the central government endorsed a second Heilongjiang provincial revolutionary committee announcement stressing that graduates should primarily be assigned to the countryside. Mao and the central government asked local government offices to assign graduated students to suitable places based on "four directions" (the countryside, frontier regions, factories, and mines) and "jiceng (grassroots places, 基层)". The central government's endorsement precipitated local government offices to make greater efforts to send graduates off. Since most factories did not have jobs available and many had halted production because of the Cultural Revolution, local governments mobilized graduates to relocate to the countryside and the frontier.

On April 21, 1968, the Beijing municipal revolutionary committee asked schools to strengthen political and ideological education to change the views of those who did not want to go to the countryside and set up several teams to mobilize the students. Propaganda was used to expedite the mobilization. In July, Several newspapers reprinted the oil painting Chairman Mao Goes to Anyuan in July, calling for students to follow Mao's revolution. In Shanghai, the city government set up an office in June to supervise the mobilization. That month, the Shanghai Party Committee organized a large-scale rally to persuade middle- and high-school graduates to go to the countryside.

On August 18, 1968, the People's Daily published commentary commemorating the second anniversary of Mao's first inspection of the Red Guards. According to the article, "Firmly Embarking on the Path of Uniting Workers, Farmers, and Soldiers," one's willingness to go to the countryside to unite farmers and workers demonstrated loyalty to Chairman Mao's revolution. Local governments adopted more forceful measures to persuade students to go to the countryside. Beijing factories did not receive any graduates, and government work teams were assigned to warn students that they would face consequences if they refused to go to the countryside. Children of families considered to have political issues were required to go to the countryside or frontier regions or the families would be treated as class enemies.

On December 22, 1968, the People's Daily published a front-page article praising city residents in Huining County of Gansu province for resettling in the countryside. An editor's note accompanying the article quoted a directive from Mao: "Chairman Mao has recently instructed us that the educated youth must go to the countryside and to receive re-education from the poor, lower and middle peasants." This directive marked the watershed moment when going to the countryside became mandatory for urban middle- and high-school graduates. Rural villages were required to receive and allocate the students. With the publication of Mao's directive, sending educated urban youth to the countryside quickly swept through China. More than 2.6 million urban students were sent to the countryside in 1969, increasing the total number of sent-down youth since 1967 to almost 4.7 million.

=== Hesitant reception ===
Although the central and local governments pushed hard with propaganda campaigns and other strategies to relocate graduated students from the cities to the countryside, some city residents and rural village officials were ambivalent about the mandate. Many families in Shanghai tried to negotiate for their children to have the best arrangements, and one father persuaded the leader of a working team to send his family's two daughters to the same place in the province of Jiangxi. Some Shanghai families tried to have their children sent to the nearby provinces of Zhejiang and Jiangsu. Others disapproved of the down-to-the-countryside mandate. In a Shanghai factory, 100 study sessions were held in 1969 to persuade workers to send their children to the countryside. Some Shanghai residents damaged the homes of street party committee members who visited families to persuade them to obey the mandate. Shanghai families with a working-class background and those who lived in shanty-housing neighborhoods were the most difficult to persuade to send their children to the countryside. In summer 1969, at the Shanghai Number 11 Textile Mill, 20 percent of students who were children of factory workers remained home after being asked to go to the countryside.

One reason it was more difficult to mobilize working-class families was that they had a more privileged class background than the families of intellectuals or those placed into the bad-class categories. Their employment at state-owned factories also gave them more bargaining power; although the factories could pressure them, their jobs were mostly stable. It was even more challenging for the Shanghai government to persuade families in shanty neighborhoods to send their children to the countryside. According to a 1969 government report, 70 percent of graduates in the Yaoshuilong neighborhood of Shanghai's Jiaozhou district refused to go to the countryside. Although most lao sanjie were eventually sent to the countryside, it is difficult to know how many went willingly.

Like many Shanghai families who were unenthusiastic about sending their children to the countryside, some cadres in rural villages were unhappy about the arrival of urban youth. Many village officials first learned the news from radio and other broadcasts. A senior official from the province of Anhui who was sent to the villages to oversee the sent-down youth mobilization wrote that local county and village officials were unprepared for the task of allocating urban youth and "were afraid to make mistakes." Village officials in the province of Heilongjiang scrambled to transport sent-down youth from train stations to villages, and it was challenging for some local Heilongjiang officials to find enough housing and food for many of the new arrivals.

In addition to urban residents' and village officials' ambivalence about the sent-down youth movement, some villagers were uncertain about how to deal with the urban youth. Eighty-six youths from Shanghai, many who had troubled records and had served time in juvenile detention, were sent to Heilongjiang's Ganchazi commune. Local residents found it challenging to deal with the youths, who reportedly fought among themselves, gambled, drank, stole, and killed animals. Anhui villages which received youths from Shanghai with criminal records encountered similar issues. According to the head of the Anhui Provincial Office of Sent-Down Youth, the villagers "hated them, but they were afraid to say anything."

Rustication did not end the Cultural Revolution in the minds of many sent-down youth, who continued to organize study groups about social issues. A few youths organized underground cells in case the opportunity for rebellion reappeared.

== Development ==
From 1962 to 1979, 16 to 18 million youth were displaced. Although many were directed to distant provinces such as Inner Mongolia, the usual destinations for sent-down youth were rural counties in neighboring areas. Many Red Guards from Shanghai travelled no further than the nearby islands of Chongming and Hengsha, at the mouth of the Yangtze.

A number of problems with the movement began to come to light in 1971, when the Communist Party allocated jobs to youths who were returning from the country. Most of these re-urbanized youth had taken advantage of personal relations (guanxi) to leave the countryside. Those involved with the alleged Project 571 coup plot denounced the movement as disguised penal labor (laogai). Mao realized the problems of the rustication movement in 1976, and decided to reexamine the issue. In the meantime, however, over one million youth continued to be rusticated every year. Many students could not deal with the harsh life, and died in the process of reeducation.

During the late 1970s and 1980s, in response to the return of sent-down youth, state-owned enterprises (SOE) often established collectively-owned enterprises to create employment opportunities for the families of SOE workers. This approach to providing jobs for returning youths was particularly common in northeast China.

=== Urban-rural gap ===
Before the arrival of urban youths, many local officials were concerned that students from the cities would add extra burdens (especially financial ones). An official in Heilongjiang's Huma County wrote a report to the provincial government that the county did not have enough land and other materials to allocate and support the 6,000 youths assigned to live there, and the county needed additional financial subsidies to settle them.

Sent-down youths were appalled by the poverty and poor living conditions in many villages of the rural regions to which they were assigned. Differences between the rural and frontier regions and Shanghai were particularly shocking. Sent-down youth from Shanghai brought clothes, bedding, soap, bowls, and food; when they returned from an annual visit home they brought more goods, some of which were desired by local villagers. In some Yunnan villages, the Shanghai sent-down youth traded goods such as clothes, soap, and candies with local villagers in exchange for local agricultural produce.

Local villages and cadres, through connections with sent-down youth and municipal offices, acquired materials which included tools for agricultural work and factories. Officials from Heilongjiang went to the Shanghai sent-down youth office in fall 1969 and asked for materials to accommodate the sent-down youth from Shanghai. The Shanghai municipal government sent supplies for the Shanghai sent-down youth in Heilongjiang and "two buses, thirteen trucks, nine tractors, thirty-six hand-operated tractors, and several cars, with a total value of 1.06 million yuan" to facilitate the local government's allocation of urban youth.

To help provide jobs for the sent-down youth, the Shanghai municipal government helped rural regions set up factories. Local officials in the city of Jinghong in Yunnan told officials in Shanghai that they wanted to build a factory manufacturing wooden products which would provide jobs for the Shanghai sent-down youth. The Shanghai government provided equipment, loans, and technicians to help build the factory. Like Shanghai, the Beijing government provided agricultural and industrial equipment and large quantities of goods to rural regions to help settle the sent-down youth.

Many sent-down youths became teachers, ad hoc engineers or barefoot doctors, and sent-down youth were a major subset of China's rural projectionists during the Cultural Revolution. Rusticated youths with an interest in broadcast technology frequently operated rural radio stations after 1968. Sent-down youth did not typically become productive agricultural workers.

It is impossible to quantify how much the cities' transfer of goods, equipment and support in building factories helped drive rural economic growth in the down-to-the countryside movement during the Cultural Revolution, but the transfer of goods, money, and technology from urban to rural regions because of urban sent-down youth played a significant role in rural economic development at this time. Emily Honig and Xiaojian Zhao wrote that sent-down youth, "sometimes unwittingly and sometimes intentionally, created connections that transcended the rural-urban divide of Maoist China."

== Return to the Cities Movement (1978–1980) ==
By the late 1970s, increasing numbers of sent-down youth sought permission to return to urban areas after spending extended periods in rural regions. Many of these individuals had originally been relocated during the Cultural Revolution as part of the rustication campaign. By the end of the decade, a large proportion had remained in the countryside for nearly ten years, often with limited access to education, stable employment, and opportunities for social mobility. The growing dissatisfaction among sent-down youth during this period, as many became uncertain about their prospects and their ability to reintegrate into urban society.

In some regions, sent-down youth organized petitions and collective appeals to local authorities requesting permission to return to their home cities. These developments as reflecting broader social pressures in the final years of the rustication program.

During the late 1970s, sent-down youth in China were generally divided into two major groups. One group consisted of urban youths who were sent to rural villages through the system known as chadui luohu (Traditional Chinese: 插隊落户; Simplified Chinese: 插队落户), where they lived among peasants and worked alongside them in agricultural production. Another group was assigned to frontier production and construction corps (Traditional Chinese: 生產建設兵團; Simplified Chinese: 生产建设兵团; pinyin: Shēngchǎn Jiànshè Bīngtuán), which operated under a semi-military structure and required collective labor in state farms and frontier regions. These units typically provided small wages and collective housing but offered fewer opportunities for returning to cities through employment transfers or administrative recruitment. Approximately two million sent-down youths served in such units, accounting for about one-fifth of the total sent-down youth population in China.

=== The Xishuangbanna Protests (1978) ===
==== Catalyst and Initial Protests ====
In Yunnan Province, large numbers of sent-down youths were assigned to state farms in the Xishuangbanna region, many of whom had been sent from Shanghai during the late 1960s and early 1970s. By the mid-1970s, many had spent several years working in frontier agricultural settlements. According to contemporary accounts, sent-down youths in these farms raised concerns about limited access to education, medical care, and long-term employment opportunities, particularly among those assigned to production corps units where prospects for returning to cities were more restricted.

A widely cited catalyst for collective protests occurred in November 1978 at the Ganlanba Farm (Traditional Chinese: 橄欖壩農場; Simplified Chinese: 橄榄坝农场) in Xishuangbanna. According to contemporary reports, a Shanghai sent-down youth named Xu, Lingxian (Chinese: 徐玲先) died during childbirth after receiving inadequate medical care. Following this incident, groups of sent-down youths gathered to mourn her death and raised demands related to medical conditions, living standards, and accountability. These discussions reportedly expanded into broader concerns regarding the long-term situation of sent-down youths who remained in rural areas.

==== Petitions and Official Intervention ====
In the weeks following the incident, sent-down youths organized petitions requesting permission to return to their home cities. Among those identified in historical accounts was Ding Huimin (Chinese: 丁惠民), a Shanghai sent-down youth who participated in drafting petitions and communicating with government authorities in Kunming and Beijing. An open letter titled Our Voice, reportedly written in October 1978, called for dialogue with central authorities regarding the future of sent-down youths.

As the situation attracted wider attention, central authorities dispatched an investigative delegation to the region. The delegation was led by Lu Tian (Chinese: 鲁田), a senior official responsible for state farm administration and educated youth affairs, who was tasked with examining local conditions and reporting to higher authorities.

During the visit of the investigative team, large assemblies of sent-down youths were organized to present their grievances. Contemporary accounts describe meetings involving several thousand participants. At one such gathering, Wu Xiangdong (Chinese: 吴向东), a Beijing sent-down youth involved in organizing petitions, delivered a speech outlining the concerns of the protesters. According to reports, Wu Xiangdong injured himself by cutting his wrist during the protest, an incident that intensified the situation and drew attention from officials present.

Reports of the protests and the interactions between sent-down youths and state representatives circulated among rusticated youths in other regions of China. Historians have identified the Xishuangbanna protests as part of a broader pattern of collective action by sent-down youths, noting the emergence of protest activity and growing demands for return to urban areas in the late 1970s.

The events in Xishuangbanna have been interpreted by scholars as reflecting the complex challenges facing Chinese authorities in the final years of the rustication program. These developments revealed tensions between local administrative practices and the expectations of sent-down youths and their families in urban areas. At the same time, the central government was confronted with broader political and social pressures as it sought to stabilize society in the post-Mao period while addressing the legacy of earlier policies. Historians have suggested that the protests formed part of wider processes that contributed to the gradual dismantling of the sent-down youth system and the implementation of policies allowing large numbers of youths to return to urban areas in the late 1970s and early 1980s.

== Experiences by gender ==
=== Female sent-down youth ===
==== Agricultural work ====
Living conditions in villages where the urban youth were sent varied, depending on whether they were sent to frontier regions such as Inner Mongolia or Heilongjiang, rural areas not too far from Shanghai or Beijing, or elsewhere in the inland provinces. Regardless of location, urban youth found it difficult to do heavy agricultural work alongside the villagers. For female sent-down youth, working in villages was particularly challenging. Some villagers listed five types of sent-down youth they did not want, and females were among them. One person in a Heilongjiang commune commented about the lack of physical strength of sent-down youth, particularly females, to perform agricultural work: "Three sent-down youth cannot match the abilities of one local. And two female sent-down youth cannot match the work of one male."

Female sent-down youth lacked the physical strength compared of their male counterparts and the villagers performing agricultural work, and had to deal with illnesses caused by working in unfavorable conditions. According to a report from a county in northeastern Jilin province, 70 percent of the female sent-down youth in the county had "female illnesses" after they worked in "wet fields during their menstrual periods." The report blamed village officials for asking the female sent-down youth to do the same work as the male sent-down youth, and blamed the young women for not being aware of their health. Wu Jianping, a female student from Beijing sent to Heilongjiang when she was 16, said that the sent-down students were very "enthusiastic" about working in the fields. Female sent-down youth did not disclose when they were menstruating, and continued working in the wet fields. As a result, said Wu, many sent-down youth developed arthritis in later life. Feng Jifang, a female student from Harbin who was sent to a state-owned farm in Heilongjiang's Bei'an County when she was 16, said that she did not have enough nutritious food despite the heavy farm work and stopped menstruating. Feng said that she had arthritis and developed pain in her spine, ankles, and wrists due to working on the farm as a teenager.

==== Marriages ====
The marriage law that took effect during the 1950s in China made explicit distinctions between men and women, setting the minimum age for marriage for men at twenty and women at eighteen. During the 1970s, the government advocated late marriages and made distinctions between urban and rural areas when setting the minimum marriage age. For urban residents, the minimum age for marriage was set at twenty-eight for men and twenty-five for women. For rural residents, the minimum marriage age was twenty-five for men and twenty-three for women. For female urban youth who went to the villages between 1966 and 1968 and were then categorized as rural residents, they reached the minimum age for late marriage around 1973. When the minimum age for marriage was reached, societal pressure mounted for youth to marry. Some young female sent-down youth from families with problematic class backgrounds viewed marrying local peasants as a way to mend their class background.

Messages from the central government about marriages of sent-down youth seemed mixed. During the late 1960s and early 1970s, when the down-to-the-countryside movement was in its prime, propaganda from news media enthusiastically encouraged sent-down youth to "put down roots for their whole life" in the villages, marry and settle in rural regions. At the same time, however, the government campaigned for late marriages. This paradox was reflected in a June 26, 1969 People's Daily article entitled "A Wild World with Great Potential" (guangkuo tiandi dayou zuowei, 广阔天地大有作为). In one paragraph, the article called for sent-down youth to settle in the countryside; in another, it stressed late marriage. At a March 1970 Beijing conference about sent-down youth, attendees stressed that sent-down youth should marry late.

Propaganda calling for sent-down youth to marry late became more intense during the early 1970s. According to a July 9, 1970, People's Daily article, whether sent-down youth married late mattered greatly to the class struggle: "The poor and middle peasants are educating the sent-down youth to deal correctly with marriage issues and persuade them to marry late. Late marriage must be understood as part of [the] class struggle. The instances of early marriage reflect class enemies trying to undermine the movement." At a 1973 meeting about sent-down youth, attendees (including former sent-down youth, premier Zhou Enlai) discussed how much money a sent-down couple would need to build a house and buy furniture if they got married. Zhou said that the sent-down youth could spend seven to ten years in the countryside until they accumulated resources and then, with some subsidies, they could get married and build a house.

Xiaomeng Liu and Michel Bonnin wrote that the government's concerns about controlling the population and housing costs were the main reasons behind its push for late marriage by sent-down youth. According to Emily Honig and Xiaojian Zhao, the government's late-marriage advocacy for sent-down youth maintained the urban-rural divide; one difference between the urban population and rural villagers was that the latter married earlier.

A watershed moment in the development of the marriage policy occurred in early 1974 when Bai Qixian, a college graduate from Hebei who married a local peasant, wrote letters to several newspapers. Bai's family opposed her decision to marry a peasant in the village where she was sent down; she shouldered much of the housework, and cared for her parents-in-law. The couple fought, and Bai's husband often beat her; her marriage was frequently mocked by the villagers. Bai wrote letters to newspapers at the end of 1973:

Some people say that marrying a peasant is no good, but in my opinion, the kind of people who covet personal enjoyment and look down on farmers are the most pathetic ... Some people say that staying behind in the countryside has no future, while I firmly believe that toiling in the vast countryside for one's whole life is a great accomplishment and has a bright future.

Bai sent her letters when the Maoist left, led by Jiang Qing, was doubling down on the Campaign to Criticize Lin Biao and Confucius. The sent-down youth, especially those who married local peasants and put down roots in the villages, were praised as heroes. Bai's marriage to a local farmer was considered an example, and state media used her story as propaganda to call for other sent-down youth to emulate her. Hebei Daily published Bai's letter on January 27, 1974, praising it as a "model text" to "criticize Lin Biao and Confucius." Not long afterwards, the People's Daily published an article about Bai. With Bai becoming famous, other local governments selected sent-down youths who married local farmers as examples. All the local-government examples, whom newspapers often praised for "breaking up completely with the old tradition," were female sent-down youths.

From 1974 to 1976, the Maoist left encouraged sent-down youth to marry local farmers. Marrying villagers was praised as supporting the political campaigns against Lin Biao and Deng Xiaoping. In Baoding, Hebei province, 1978 statistics indicated that of the sent-down youth who were married, 75.5 percent married local farmers. In Jilin province, 74.9 percent of sent-down youth married local farmers in 1980.

==== Sexual violence ====
In some rural regions, sent-down youth were sexually abused by local officials and villagers. In June 1973, the National Working Conference on Sent-Down Youth was held in Beijing. Before the six-week meeting, the State Council sent working teams to 24 provinces to investigate living conditions of the sent-down youth. The teams reported that from 1969 to 1973, there were 23,000 incidents in which sent-down youth were mistreated or abused.

Of the 23,000 incidents, 70 percent were sexual violence against female sent-down youth. During the early 1970s, more cases of sexual violence against female sent-down youth were reported. Of all reported abuse in Hebei in 1972, 94 percent were sexual violence against female sent-down youth; the percentage in Jiangsu and Jilin was about 80 percent.

At the Inner Mongolia Production and Construction Corps, 11 such cases were reported in 1969; the number of cases rose to 54 in 1970, and to 69 in 1972. From 1969 to 1973, 507 cases of sexual violence were reported in Guangxi province. At the Heilongjiang Production and Construction Corps, 365 sexual-violence cases were reported from 1968 to 1973. In some reported cases, the female sent-down youth became pregnant after being raped. In some cases (many committed by local cadres of the villages or Production and Construction Corps), the women who were sexually assaulted experienced physical or mental illness; some died.

It is difficult to know how many female sent-down youth experienced sexual violence. Many kept silent in fear that they might not return to the city if they said anything. Some did not make their attacks public because victims of sexual violence were still stigmatized. Some who were from families with "bad" class backgrounds did not dare report local cadres who had the power to retaliate.

=== Rural male peasants demonized, female peasants ignored ===
Although it is impossible to calculate how much abuse or sexual violence was committed against sent-down youth, its severity prompted the central government to issue Document 21 in 1972. In December 1972, schoolteacher Li Qinglin of Fujian wrote a letter to Mao. Li complained about how local cadres exercised their power over the sent-down youth and the poor living conditions of his son, who was sent to a village. Mao replied to Li, promising that he would solve the problems. Zhou Enlai and other leaders held a meeting and produced Document 21, which stated that those who undermined the down-to-the-countryside movement and abused their power would be punished.

Reports from 1973 suggested that language used in government reports began to shift. Sexual relationships (including consensual relationships) between female sent-down youth and male villagers were increasingly described with the word jian, such as tongjian (extramarital sex), youjian (to trick someone into sex), and qiangjian (rape). Before the central government held its national working conference on sent-down youth in June 1973, Zhou Enlai read reports about two severe cases of sexual violence against female sent-down youth: one committed by local state-owned military farm officials in Yunnan, and the other by local cadres in Heilongjiang. Enraged, Zhou ordered the Yunnan report sent to all participants in the conference and required attendees to thoroughly investigate sexual violence after returning to their provinces. Other leaders at the conference requested the execution of cadres at military farms in Yunnan.

By the end of the conference on August 4, 1973, Document 30 (which forbade rape and forced marriage in the sent-down youth movement) was published. Local governments carried out extensive campaigns following Document 30, targeting rapes and other forms of sexual assault. The campaigns were so intense that local officials, under pressure to produce reports, criminalized many sexual relationships (including consensual ones) between sent-down youth and local villagers. When local officials were unable to draft enough reports, some dug up incidents from the past to criminalize sexual relationships.

In reports about sent-down youth from Shanghai, all sexual relationships that were criminalized had local male farmers as perpetrators and female sent-down youth as victims. In some cases, consensual sexual relationships were criminalized. In a few cases, local farmers who married female sent-down youth were deemed perpetrators of sexual violence against their wives. Emily Honig and Xiaojian Zhao proposed that in reports about Shanghai's sent-down youth, it was plausible to suspect that local male farmers might have been "scapegoated of the powerful cadres accused of sexual assaults." Mention of local female farmers or male sent-down youth who might have been involved in sexual violence cases or other, criminalized sexual relationships was missing from the reports.

Sexual abuse of sent-down youth, primarily women, was severe and widespread. The criminalization also included other sexual relationships between sent-down youth and local villagers, including consensual relationships and marriages. Reports about Shanghai's sent-down youth indicated a broad gap between urban and rural, and were gendered. Rural male peasants were demonized and portrayed as sexual predators, and victims were urban female sent-down youth. Male sent-down youths who had sexual relationships with women, including other sent-down youth and local female villagers, were not criminalized. Rural female peasants who might have experienced sexual violence or engaged in sexual relationships with sent-down youth were excluded from the reports.

== Rehabilitation ==
Returned sent-down youth were among the personnel recruited for the Third Front. After Mao's death in 1976, many rusticated youth remained in the countryside; some had married into their villages. University entrance exams were reinstated in 1977, inspiring most rusticated youth to try to return to the city. In Yunnan in the winter of 1978, youth used strikes and petitions to implore the government to hear their plight; this reinforced the pressing nature of the issue to party authorities.

About 6.5 million sent-down youths returned to cities in 1978 and 1979, creating employment pressure. Deng and other reformist policymakers advocated legalization of small-scale private businesses and overcame objections from conservative policymakers by appealing to the measure's low-cost job-creation benefits for returning sent-down youth.

On March 8, 1980, CCP general secretary Hu Yaobang proposed ending rustication. On October 1, the party decided to end the movement and allow youth to return to their families in the cities. Under age and marriage restrictions, one child per family of rusticated youth was permitted to accompany their parents to their native cities.

During the late 1970s, scar literature included vivid and realistic descriptions of their experiences and were the first public exploration of the cost of the Cultural Revolution. A different kind of rustication literature, more nuanced in its evaluation of the experience, was introduced during the 1980s by Shanghai writer and former zhiqing Chen Cun.

== See also ==
- Social structure of China
