= Murong Xuecun =

Chinese writer and blogger

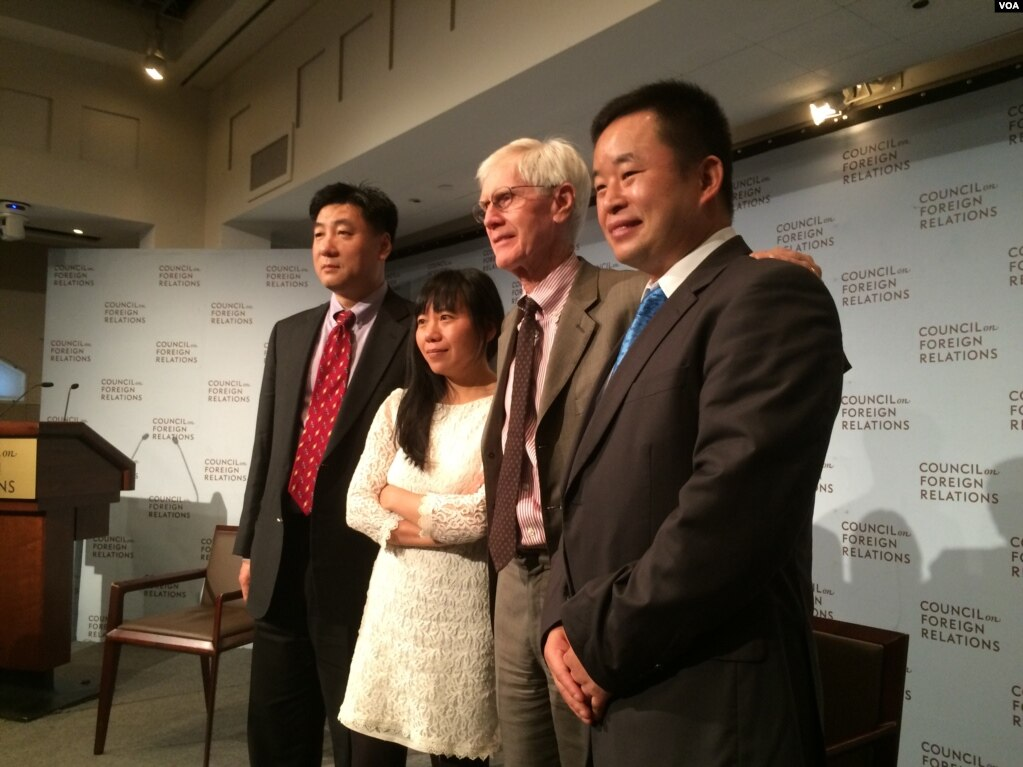
- Murong (rightmost) in 2015
- Born: Hao Qun; 1974 (age 51–52); Pingdu, Shandong, China
- Citizenship: Australia
- Education: China University of Political Science and Law
- Occupation: Writer
- Writing career
- Pen name: Murong Xuecun
- Years active: 2002–present

Murong Xuecun (Chinese: 慕容 雪村; pinyin: Mùróng Xuěcūn, born 1974) is the pen name of the Chinese writer Hao Qun (郝群). His debut work Leave Me Alone: A Novel of Chengdu (Chinese: 成都，今夜请将我遗忘), which was distributed online, propelled him to stardom. On July 22, 2008, Murong made the long list for the Man Asian Literary Prize.

Murong's writing deals mostly with social issues in contemporary China, exploring themes such as corruption, business-government relations, and general disillusionment over modern life. His literature is known for its nihilistic, realist, racy, and fatalist style. Following his rise to fame, Murong has emerged as one of the foremost critics of censorship in China.

Murong fled China in August 2021, fearing reprisals from the Chinese authorities for his reporting on the COVID-19 lockdown in Wuhan. As of October 2022, he lives in Melbourne.

== Early life and education ==
Murong Xuecun, whose real name is Hao Qun, was born in 1974 in a mountainous hamlet near Baishan, Jilin province, China. His parents were farmers, and when he was two years old, they moved to rural Shandong province. He has described his childhood as impoverished, with a scarcity of books; during harvest seasons, village storytellers narrated tales of historical heroes and spirits, which inspired his interests in reading.

Murong graduated from the China University of Political Science and Law in Beijing in 1996, where he studied law. He served as head of a campus literature club for his longstanding love for novels and poetry.

== Career ==
Murong's writing primarily addresses sociopolitical issues in China, including themes like corruption, sex, and underground life.

=== Early career ===
Murong rose to fame as an internet writer with his debut online novel Leave Me Alone: A Novel of Chengdu' (originally titled ''Chengdu, Please Forget Me Tonight'' in Chinese) in 2002. The book, which explores themes of gambling, drugs, and prostitution among young men in dead-end jobs, became a massive hit, selling three million copies, inspiring a television drama, and earning an English translation longlisted for the Man Asian Literary Prize in 2008. He quit his job to write full-time, producing subsequent novels like Heaven to the Left, Shenzhen to the Right (2004) and Dancing Through Red Dust (2008).

Leave Me Alone was published on Tianya and two other internet communities. It was inspired by the success of another Chinese online literary work, The First Intimate Contact.

=== Criticism of censorship ===
In 2009, Murong Xuecun wrote an exposé on a pyramid scheme in Jiangxi province. The work, China: In the Absence of a Remedy (Chinese: 中国，少了一味药), was a first-hand account of Murong's personal experiences with the pyramid scheme network that lasted twenty-three days. Murong Xuecun was awarded the 2010 People's Literature Prize (Chinese: 人民文学奖) for the work.

In his acceptance speech for the Prize, Murong wrote a scathing commentary about his editor that he worked with for China: In the absence of a remedy. He also launched into a critique of the state of censorship in China in general. The speech was banned at the awards ceremony, but made its rounds across the internet. The draft of the speech was translated into English and delivered to the Hong Kong Foreign Correspondents’ Club in February 2011, followed by a publication by The New York Times in November 2011. In the draft, Murong alluded to a wide array of censorship restrictions, including limits on discussing current affairs, contemporary personalities, and being forced to change the phrase "Chinese people" to "some people" in parts of his work. More obscure restrictions were also discussed, such as scrubbing the use of "Henan people" because it carries the air of regional discrimination, and removing references to "India-flavoured farts" because the editor was concerned about a diplomatic rift between China and India. Murong wrote that "The only truth is that we cannot speak the truth. The only acceptable viewpoint is that we cannot express a viewpoint. We cannot criticise the system, we cannot discuss current affairs, we cannot even mention distant Ethiopia."

In his feature story in Norwegian newspaper Aftenposten in 2011, his criticism of Chinese authorities included claims that for detainees of China, there are a number of "odd ways of dying while under arrest" — at least one individual allegedly "died while playing hide-and-seek", and at least another allegedly "died while he was drinking water", and at least one allegedly "died while he was dreaming".

From 2011 to 2016, state security agents harassed him frequently, including 40 informal interrogation sessions (nicknamed "drinking tea 喝茶"), two occurrence of house arrest, and pressure that cut off his income sources. He contributed opinion pieces to The New York Times from 2013 to 2016, critiquing government policies and censorship. In 2016, he co-founded a WeChat account called Seven Writers for critical essays, but it was shut down after six months.

=== Exile and later work ===
In April 2020, shortly before Wuhan's lockdown was lifted, Murong travelled to the city and spent about a month secretly interviewing more than thirty residents. He focused on the stories of eight ordinary people for his book Deadly Quiet City: True Stories from Wuhan including an exhausted doctor, an illegal taxi driver, and a citizen journalist, among others. Fearing state repercussions more than the virus itself, he left Wuhan in May and spent the next eight months writing the manuscript in a hotel at the foot of Mount Emei in Sichuan, deleting each chapter from his laptop after sending it to his Australian editor.

By mid-2021, with the book in final editing and thirty-eight acquaintances already detained for criticizing the government's pandemic response, Murong realized he would likely be arrested if he stayed in China. On 7 August 2021, he left Beijing with a single suitcase, flew to Hong Kong and then London, and eventually settled in Melbourne, Australia, where he now lives in exile.

Deadly Quiet City was published in Australia in 2022 and in the United States in 2023. It documents the fear, suffering and propaganda experienced by ordinary Wuhan residents during the world's first and strictest COVID-19 lockdown.

In exile, Murong has said he feels “liberated from a cage” and can now “write anything I want.” He is completing a screenplay about Liu Xiaobo and writing a novel about a dissident poet and his secret-police handler.

== Works ==
- Leave Me Alone: A Novel of Chengdu (成都，今夜请将我遗忘, 2002)
- Dancing Through Red Dust (原谅我红尘颠倒, 2008)
- The Missing Ingredient (中国，少了一味药, 2010)
- Deadly Quiet City: Stories From Wuhan, COVID Ground Zero (禁城：武汉传来的声音, 2022)
