= Swallowed Star =

Chinese web novel by I Eat Tomatoes

- Author: I Eat Tomatoes (我吃西红柿)
- Original title: 吞噬星空
- Language: Chinese
- Subject: Science fiction, Post-apocalyptic, Martial arts
- Genre: Web novel
- Publisher: Qidian (online), Hubei Juvenile and Children's Publishing House (physical)
- Publication date: 2010–2012 (online), May 2012 (physical)
- Publication place: China
- Media type: Web novel, Print
- ISBN: 978-7-5353-6822-5
- Website: book.qidian.com/info/1639199/

Swallowed Star (Chinese: 吞噬星空) is a Chinese science fiction web novel written by author I Eat Tomatoes (Hong Zhu). The novel was serialized on the platform Qidian from 2010 to 2012, consisting of 1,544 chapters and approximately 4.78 million words. In May 2012, it was published as a series of physical books by Hubei Juvenile and Children's Publishing House.

== Publication ==
Swallowed Star was serialized online on Qidian.com, a major Chinese web novel platform, beginning in 2010 and concluding in 2012. Following its online success, the novel was published in a series of physical volumes by Hubei Juvenile and Children's Publishing House starting in May 2012. The work is an example of the popular Chinese genre of "apocalyptic wasteland" (废土流) fiction.

== Plot ==
Set in an alternate 2015, the story begins 30 years after a mutated virus known as the "RR virus" caused a global pandemic, drastically reducing the world's population. The survivors, including humans and animals, developed antibodies that granted them enhanced physical abilities. This led to a new world order where evolved "monsters" challenge humanity for dominance, forcing the remnants of civilization into fortified base areas.

The protagonist, Luo Feng, is a high school student who aspires to become a "warrior" to protect his family. He joins the Fire Hammer Squad, a team of warriors who venture outside the base to hunt monsters and gather resources. Through his combat experience and training, Luo Feng's abilities grow rapidly. He eventually passes the rigorous selection for an Elite Training Camp and undertakes dangerous missions, including exploring the "No. 9 Ruin of Ancient Civilization." As he progresses, Luo Feng uncovers the truth behind the RR virus and the larger structure of the universe, ultimately rising to become a powerful figure who defends humanity.

== Characters ==
Luo Feng is the protagonist. He begins as an ordinary student and, through perseverance and training, becomes one of Earth's most powerful warriors. He is depicted as intelligent and determined, steadily advancing through the ranks of fighters to ultimately save mankind. Xu Xin is Luo Feng's classmate who later becomes his wife. She is a supporting character who maintains a close relationship with Luo Feng throughout his journey. Thor is one of the strongest warriors on Earth and a sworn brother of Luo Feng. He specializes in controlling lightning and founds the Thunder God Martial Arts Hall. Hong is another of Luo Feng's sworn brothers and the original strongest warrior on Earth. He is skilled with firearms and eventually becomes a powerful being known as the Illusionary Heart True God. Luo Hua is Luo Feng's younger brother. Originally disabled, he regains the ability to walk and later demonstrates a talent for business, becoming an extremely wealthy individual who provides financial support to Luo Feng.

== Reception and Adaptations ==
Swallowed Star has been adapted into several media properties.

Games: In May 2018, Yuewen Games released an action mobile game based on the novel, also titled Swallowed Star. A sequel, Dawn of Swallowed Star, was released on April 7, 2023. Animation: In 2020, Tencent Video released an animated series adaptation of the novel. The series is also available for streaming on Crunchyroll. In 2021, the animation was included on the Chinese Online Literature Influence List in the IP Adaptation category, recognizing its significant impact.
