= The First Intimate Contact =

1998 novel by Tsai Jhi-hsin

The First Intimate Contact 第一次的親密接觸
- Author: Tsai Jhi-hsin (蔡智恆)
- Language: Chinese
- Publication date: 1998
- Publication place: Taiwan

The First Intimate Contact (traditional Chinese: 第一次的親密接觸; simplified Chinese: 第一次的亲密接触; pinyin: Dì yī cì de qīn mì jiē chǔ) is a 1998 novel by Taiwanese writer Tsai Jhi-heng (蔡智恆, with pen name 痞子蔡 and userID jht). The novel was influential in the development of Chinese online literature.

It tells the story of a young man who finds love through the internet, but his love interest dies of a fatal disease.

First Intimate Contact circulated widely online and its print edition quickly became a best seller. It has also been adapted into a movie.

== Background ==
Graduate student Tsai Jhi-heng (蔡智恆 pen name "Rowdy Tsai" Pizi Cai 痞子蔡) authored the text.

The First Intimate Contact was originally a work of online literature published in installments on a bulletin board system of National Cheng Kung University and was later released in print.

== Plot summary ==
The First Intimate Contact tells the story of as young man who finds love through the Internet, the love interest dies to a fatal disease.

The protagonist (who shares the same name as the author) meets and falls in love with a girl, FlyNDance, on the Internet. They eventually meet up in real life and become a couple, going out by day and chatting online by night. After some time together, however, FlyNDance is diagnosed with systemic lupus erythematosus (erroneously translated as erysipelas in the English translation), which symbolically causes a butterfly-shaped rash to appear on her face. The disease proves to be fatal and the novel ends with the protagonist finding and reading a letter FlyNDance had written for him before she died.

== Reception ==
As academic Jessica Imbach summarizes, the novel "captured the zeitgeist of the early internet age and spread like wildfire through BBS forums in Taiwan and China." The print version of the book quickly became a best-seller.

Literary critics generally described the novel as unsophisticated.

== Influence ==
The romance story helped establish a model of publishing online to develop popularity in order to get a literary work published in print and adapted to other media. According to academic Jessica Imbach, the novel "brought a new form of community-based literary practice, in which authors and readers closely interact, to mainstream attention, and simultaneously also demonstrated how commercially successful web-based content could be."

The First Intimate Contact inspired other works of online literature, including Leave Me Alone: A Novel of Chengdu by Hao Qun (Murong Xuecun).

Soon after the complete novel was released online, an anonymous Singaporean language localization was written in English and circulated around the Internet under the name Dolce Vita. This version is considerably shorter than the original and takes place in Singapore instead of Taiwan.

It has been adapted into a graphic novel and a movie.
