= National Radio and Television Administration =

Chinese supervisory board for media

- 国家广播电视总局; Guójiā Guǎngbō Diànshì Zǒngjú
- Logo of the National Radio and Television Administration

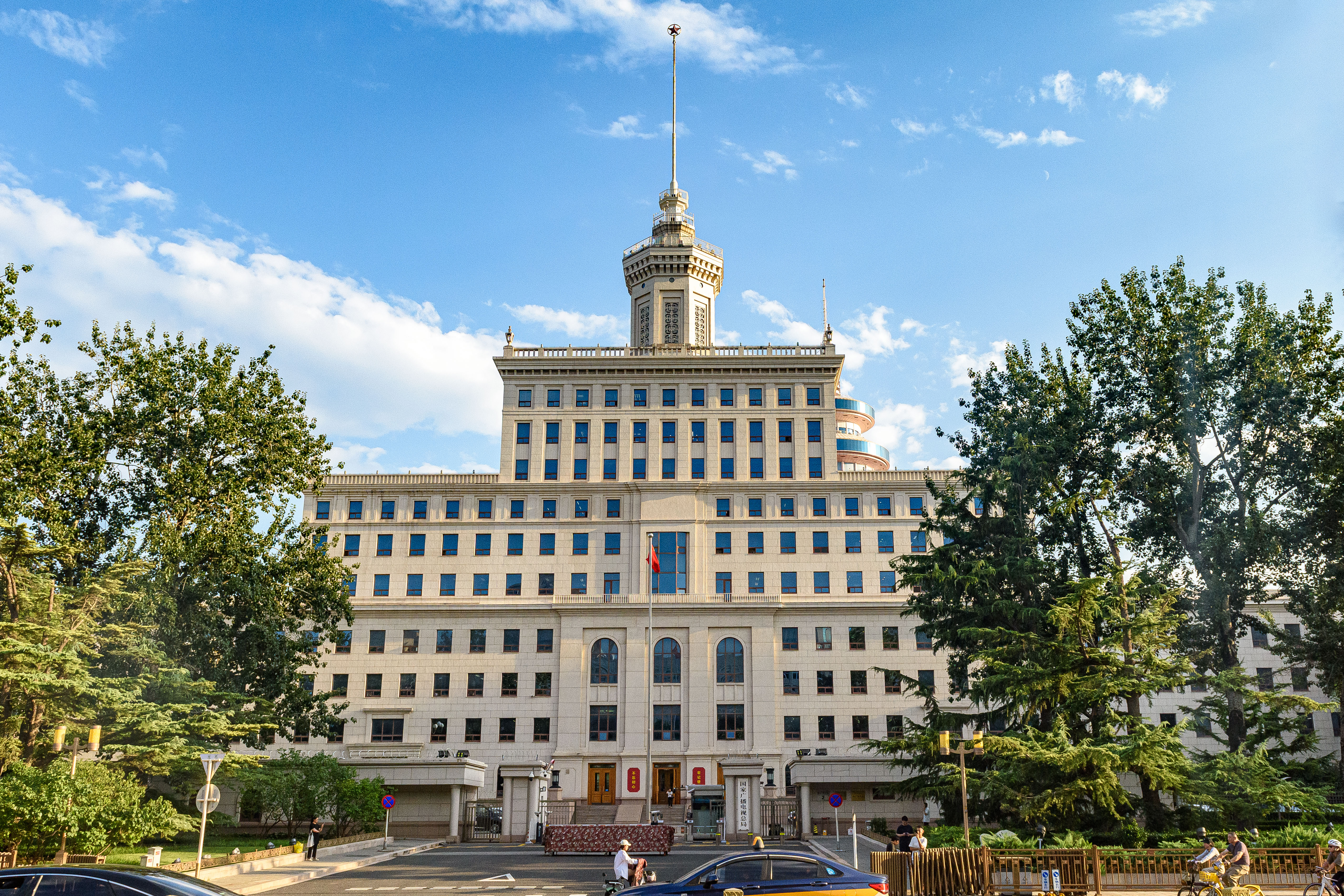

Agency overview
- Formed: 2018; 8 years ago
- Preceding agencies: State Administration of Press, Publication, Radio, Film and Television; State Administration of Radio, Film, and Television
- Agency executive: Cao Shumin, Director
- Parent department: Publicity Department of the Chinese Communist Party
- Website: www.nrta.gov.cn

National Radio and Television Administration
- Simplified Chinese: 国家广播电视总局
- Traditional Chinese: 國家廣播電視總局
Transcriptions
Standard Mandarin
- Hanyu Pinyin: Guójiā Guǎngbō Diànshì Zǒngjú
- Bopomofo: ㄍㄨㄛ´ ㄐㄧㄚ ㄍㄨㄤˇ ㄅㄛ ㄉㄧㄢ` ㄕ` ㄗㄨㄥˇ ㄐㄩ´
- Gwoyeu Romatzyh: guo2 jia1 guang3 bo1 dian4 shi4 zong3 ju2

State Administration of Press, Publication, Radio, Film and Television (2013–2018)
- Simplified Chinese: 国家新闻出版广电总局
- Traditional Chinese: 國家新聞出版廣電總局
Transcriptions
Standard Mandarin
- Hanyu Pinyin: Guójiā Xīnwén Chūbǎn Guǎngdiàn Zǒngjú
- Bopomofo: ㄍㄨㄛ´ ㄐㄧㄚ ㄒㄧㄣ ㄨㄣ´ ㄔㄨ ㄅㄢˇ ㄍㄨㄤˇ ㄉㄧㄢ` ㄗㄨㄥˇ ㄐㄩ´
- Gwoyeu Romatzyh: guo2 jia1 xin1 wen2 chu1 ban3 guang3 dian4 zong3 ju2

State Administration of Radio, Film, and Television (1998–2013)
- Simplified Chinese: 国家广播电影电视总局
- Traditional Chinese: 國家廣播電影電視總局
Transcriptions
Standard Mandarin
- Hanyu Pinyin: Guójiā Guǎngbò Diànyǐng Diànshì Zǒngjú
- Bopomofo: ㄍㄨㄛ´ ㄐㄧㄚ ㄍㄨㄤˇ ㄅㄛ ㄉㄧㄢ` ㄧㄥˇ ㄉㄧㄢ` ㄕ` ㄗㄨㄥˇ ㄐㄩ´
- Gwoyeu Romatzyh: guo2 jia1 guang3 bo1 dian4 ying3 dian4 shi4 zong3 ju2

The National Radio and Television Administration (NRTA) is a ministry-level executive agency controlled by the Publicity Department of the Chinese Communist Party (CCP). Its main task is the administration and supervision of state-owned enterprises engaged in the television and radio industries. Its current director is Cao Shumin.

It directly controls state-owned enterprises at the national level such as China Central Television, China National Radio, and China Radio International, as well as other movie and television studios and other non-business organizations.

The administration was formerly known as the State Administration of Press, Publication, Radio, Film and Television (SAPPRFT) from 2013 to 2018, and the State Administration of Radio, Film, and Television (SARFT) from 1998 to 2013.

== History ==
In 1986 the Ministry of Culture Film Bureau and the Ministry of Radio and Television merged to form the Ministry of Radio, Film and Television (MRFT). On 25 June 1998 the Ministry of Radio, Film and Television reorganized as the State Administration of Radio, Film and Television.

In 1998, the State Administration of Radio, Film, and Television (SARFT) began the Connecting Every Village with Radio and TV Project, which extended radio and television broadcasting to every village in China. Then successful implementation of this project subsequently influenced the Ministry of Industry and Information Technology's Connecting Every Village Project, which developed telecommunications and internet infrastructure in rural China.

In March 2013 the State Council announced plans to merge State Administration of Radio, Film, and Television with the General Administration of Press and Publication to form the State Administration of Press and Publication, Radio, Film, and Television (SAPPRFT).

Beginning in 2015, SAPPRFT began promoting and recommending works of internet literature which it deemed outstanding for the works' promotion of socialist values (the National Press and Publication Administration continued this function after the dissolution of SAPPRFT).

In March 2018, the SAPPRFT was abolished and its functions of the movie, press and publication industry regulation were moved from the State Council to the CCP's Central Propaganda Department as part of a series of institutional reforms.

In July 2021, the NRTA entered into an agreement with Russia's Ministry of Digital Development, Communications and Mass Media to cooperate on news coverage and media narratives.

In June 2022, the NRTA and the Ministry of Culture and Tourism issued a code of conduct for online hosts of live streams and podcasts banning any content that "weakens, distorts, or denies the leadership of the CCP."

== Role in regulating film, television, and internet content ==
The NRTA issues mandatory guidelines for media content. In 2011 and 2012 (when still SARFT) it limited the number of reality television programs and of historical dramas expressing particular disapproval of programs with a plot twist that involved time travel back to a Chinese historical era. This decree resulted in cancellation of a number of planned films with historical drama plots.

It issued a directive on 30 March 2009 to highlight 31 categories of content prohibited online, including violence, pornography, content which may "incite ethnic discrimination or undermine social stability". Some industry observers believe that the move was designed to stop the spread of parodies or other comments on politically sensitive issues in the runup to the anniversary of the 1989 Tiananmen Square protests and massacre.

In 2015, SAPPRFT issued its Guiding Opinions Concerning the Healthy Development of Online Literature. The Guiding Opinions stated that online literature portals should "enhance online literation editorial staff management mechanisms; implement appointment qualification systems; establish and improve systems such as the real-name registration of writers, the responsible editor system, the publishing unit undersigning system, etc."

In 2017, SAPPRFT issued the Provisional Methods for Evaluating Social Benefits of Online Literature Publication Service Platforms, which proposed criteria to evaluate the social impact of literature portals in order to "improve the quality of published works, regulate the marker order, optimize the development environment, and guide internet literature publishers ... to constantly produce excellent works that organically integrate ideology, artistry, and readability, to better meet the people's spiritual and cultural needs."

On 2 September 2021, the NRTA issued a Notice stating that the entertainment industry's culture must be based on "loving the Party, loving the nation" and "upholding moral and artistic standards." The Notice states that radio and television programs should uphold "cultural confidence" and "vigorously carry forward China's outstanding traditional culture, revolutionary culture, and advanced socialist culture."The NRTA prohibited broadcasters from displaying what it termed "sissy men and other abnormal aesthetics."

Following a public controversy in which photos of actor-singer Zhang Zhehan in front of Japan's Yasukuni Shrine circulated, NRTA and the CCP Publicity Department began an initiative in September 2021 to emphasize that "the artists with bad records and incorrect political stance need to be boycotted from the entire network".

In June 2026, the NRTA implemented a campaign to against "harmful, lowbrow, and pirated" content in the duanju (micro-drama) field. Among other areas, the campaign seeks to eliminate material deemed as harmful to children, wealth-flaunting, overly-sexualized, or which includes copyright infringing material.

== Technical details ==
In its role of providing the physical infrastructure for broadcasting the NRTA plays a similar role in China as TDF Group plays in France, or Crown Castle plays in the US or Australia. It owns and operates, as well as manages many thousands of MW, FM, TV and Shortwave relay transmitters in China (as well as those leased abroad for external broadcasting).

=== CMMB deployment ===
China Multimedia Mobile Broadcasting (CMMB) is a mobile television and multimedia standard developed and specified in China by the State Administration of Radio, Film, and Television (SARFT). It is based on the Satellite and Terrestrial Interactive Multiservice Infrastructure (STiMi), developed by TiMiTech, a company formed by the Chinese Academy of Broadcasting Science. Announced in October 2006, it has been described as being similar to Europe's DVB-SH standard for digital video broadcast from both satellites and terrestrial 'gap fillers' to handheld devices.

It specifies usage of the 2.6 GHz frequency band and occupies 25 MHz bandwidth within which it provides 25 video and 30 radio channels with some additional data channels. Multiple companies have chips that support CMMB standard - Innofidei who was the first with a solution March 28, 2007, Siano Mobile Silicon (with the SMS118x chip family, which support diversity and have superb performance) and more.

== See also ==
- Media history of China
- Mass media in China
- Public opinion guidance
