= Four Big Things =

Most desirable goods in China from the 1950s to the 1970s

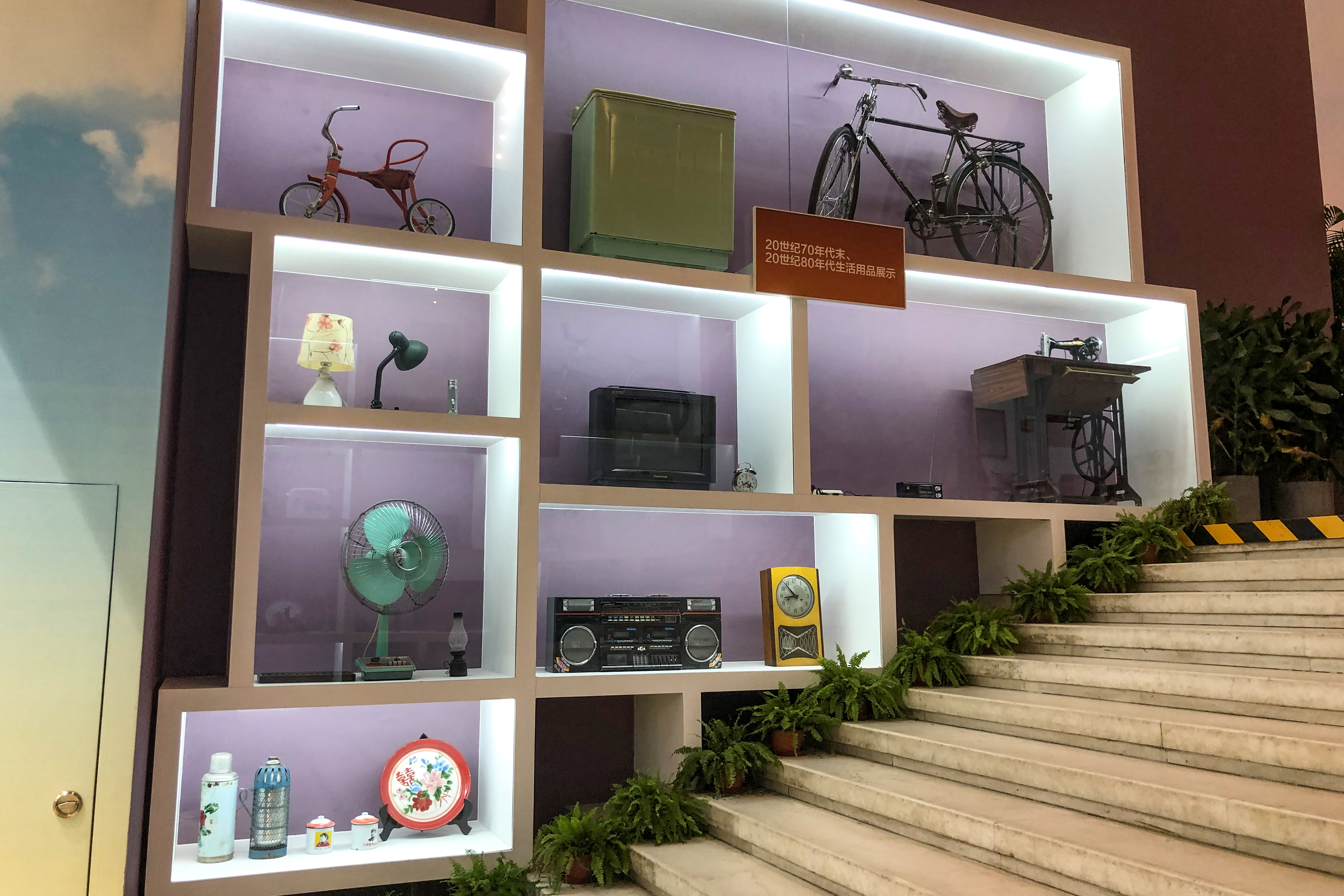
Some of the four big things displayed on a rack.

The Four Big Things (Chinese: 四大件; pinyin: sì dà jiàn), sometimes rendered in English as Four Big Items, is a term originally applied to the four symbols of material success in China from the 1950s until the 1970s, and is now used to refer to any visible marker of newfound affluence. The original list was:

1. A sewing machine, generally a Flying Man pedal-driven one;
2. A bicycle, generally Flying Pigeon;
3. A wristwatch, generally from Shanghai Watch Company;
4. A radio receiver, usually Red Star or Red Lantern brand.

In the 1980s, the Big Things included other consumer goods like refrigerator, colour television, washing machine, and tape recorder, especially items from imported brands like Panasonic. More recently, the "Four Big Things" could include cameras, cell phones, computers, apartments, cars, etc.
