= Chen Dong (writer) =

Chinese web novelist

- 辰东
- Born: Yang Zhendong; 1982 (age 43–44); Beijing, China
- Education: China University of Petroleum
- Occupation: Writer
- Writing career
- Language: Chinese
- Years active: 2004–present
- Genres: Xuanhuan, xianxia, science fiction
- Notable works: Tomb of Fallen Gods; Shrouding the Heavens; Perfect World; The Sacred Ruins; Beyond the Deep Space; Night Without Bounds
- Notable awards: 2019 Mao Dun Literature Newcomer Award – Web Literature Newcomer Award

Chen Dong (Chinese: 辰东; pinyin: Chén Dōng), born Yang Zhendong (Chinese: 杨振东), is a Chinese web novelist. He is known for large-scale xuanhuan and xianxia fiction, particularly Tomb of Fallen Gods, Shrouding the Heavens, Perfect World, and The Sacred Ruins. He later wrote the science-fiction-influenced Beyond the Deep Space and the ongoing fantasy novel Night Without Bounds.

Chen Dong entered online literature in 2004 with Undying and Immortal. His second novel, Tomb of Fallen Gods, established his reputation and was followed by The World of Immortals, Shrouding the Heavens, Perfect World, The Sacred Ruins, and Beyond the Deep Space. He is a member of the China Writers Association and a platinum-level author associated with Qidian.

In 2019, Chen Dong received the Mao Dun Literature Newcomer Award for Web Literature, becoming one of ten writers selected for the second edition of the award.

== Early life and education ==
Chen Dong, born Yang Zhendong in 1982 in Beijing, China, graduated from China University of Petroleum. He developed an interest in wuxia fiction from an early age.

He began reading wuxia fiction in elementary school and discovered online novels while studying at university. During his university years, he read extensively on major online-literature websites before beginning his career as a web novelist.

== Career ==
=== Early writing ===
Chen Dong began publishing online fiction in 2004, when he serialized Undying and Immortal on Qidian. The novel was his first published work and established the basic approach to large-scale fantasy and cultivation fiction that would characterize his later writing.

His second novel, Tomb of Fallen Gods, began serialization in 2006. It was his breakthrough work and a sequel to Undying and Immortal. The novel combined fantasy adventure with a large-scale mythological setting and established Chen Dong as a prominent web novelist..

=== Tomb of Fallen Gods and rise to prominence ===
Tomb of Fallen Gods became widely popular during its serialization. The novel ranked first on the Baidu Fiction Billboard for 23 consecutive weeks. Its success also led to adaptations in other media, including a game.

The novel was followed in 2008 by The World of Immortals. Chen Dong then serialized Shrouding the Heavens beginning in 2010, followed by Perfect World in 2013.

=== Shrouding the Heavens and Perfect World ===
Shrouding the Heavens became one of Chen Dong's best-known novels. It uses a cultivation framework combined with an expansive cosmic setting, beginning with a group of university students transported from Earth aboard a bronze coffin pulled by nine dragons. The novel was followed by Perfect World, which continued and expanded ideas associated with Chen Dong's interconnected fictional settings.

Chen Dong viewed web literature as being closer to the needs of its readers, although he acknowledged that the quality of works varied. He also believed that writers should consider the influence of their works on readers and take greater responsibility for the social impact of online literature.

Chen Dong achieved significant commercial success with Shrouding the Heavens and Perfect World. In 2014, he ranked second among China's highest-earning online writers, with reported royalties of 28 million yuan. In the following edition, he ranked third with reported royalties of 38 million yuan, with Perfect World listed as his representative work.

=== The Sacred Ruins ===
In 2016, Chen Dong began publishing The Sacred Ruins. The novel quickly became one of the most popular works on Qidian, topping the platform's monthly ticket rankings for ten months in 2017. It was also included in the China Writers Association's 2016 program for supporting key online-literature works.

=== Beyond the Deep Space ===
In early May 2021, Chen Dong began publishing Beyond the Deep Space on Qidian. It marked his first attempt at future science fiction while retaining his characteristic large-scale world-building and fast-paced style. The novel quickly gained attention on the platform, attracting 78 alliance leaders and reaching the top of several major Qidian rankings, including the new-book chart for contracted authors.

The novel concluded on 2 June 2023 after approximately 5.34 million Chinese characters.

=== Night Without Bounds ===
Chen Dong began serializing Night Without Bounds on Qidian on 6 September 2024. The novel is an Eastern fantasy story set in a world where the sun has disappeared and never rises again. The novel is still being serialized as of 2026.

== Writing style and themes ==
Chen Dong's novels are known for their large-scale fantasy settings, extensive world-building, and narratives that combine cultivation, mythology, mystery, and conflicts on a cosmic scale. Tomb of Fallen Gods features a grand narrative structure, numerous interconnected plotlines, and a wide-ranging fantasy world.

His major works also share recurring concepts and connections. Shrouding the Heavens, Perfect World, and The Sacred Ruins are commonly treated as a connected sequence, with recurring ideas, historical links, and related cosmological frameworks across the three novels.

His fiction has also expanded beyond conventional xuanhuan and xianxia settings. Beyond the Deep Space introduced a future-oriented science-fiction framework, while Night Without Bounds returned to Eastern fantasy and cultivation motifs within an apocalyptic setting.

== Reception and commercial success ==
Chen Dong is regarded as one of the prominent figures in Chinese web literature. Qidian lists him as a platinum author and one of the representative figures of online literature, while China Writers Network describes him as one of the most influential and representative web novelists. Tomb of Fallen Gods is identified as his breakthrough work.

His commercial success has been reflected in repeated appearances on the China Online Writers Rich List. He ranked second in the 2014 edition with reported royalties of 28 million yuan and third in the following edition with reported royalties of 38 million yuan.

In 2019, he received the second Web Literature Newcomer Award of the Mao Dun Literature Newcomer Award. He was among ten web novelists recognized that year, reflecting the increasing institutional recognition of online literature within China's literary organizations.

== Personal life ==
Chen Dong has described himself as a low-key person. In a 2015 interview, he discussed his childhood interest in wuxia fiction, his university years, and how he began writing online novels, while also speaking about his views on web literature and his responsibilities as a writer.

He has remained closely associated with the online-literature community and has continued to publish through Qidian throughout his career.

== Adaptations ==
Several of Chen Dong's novels have been adapted into animated series, games, and other media.

=== Perfect World ===
An animated adaptation of Perfect World premiered on Tencent Video on 23 April 2021. The series was produced by Penguin Pictures and animated by Foch Films and Ian Animation.

=== Tomb of Fallen Gods ===
An animated adaptation of Tomb of Fallen Gods premiered on Youku on 21 July 2022. The series was jointly produced by Youku Animation and Wonder Cat Animation, with animation production by Wonder Cat Animation and Rocen Digital.

A new year-long season of the animated adaptation of Tomb of Fallen Gods premiered on Youku on 8 August 2025. It was produced by Youku Animation and Wonder Cat, with animation by Wonder Cat Animation and Ian Animation.

=== Shrouding the Heavens ===
A 3D animated adaptation of Shrouding the Heavens premiered on Tencent Video on 3 May 2023. The series was produced by Penguin Pictures and Xingyue Chenshi, with Original Force responsible for animation production. It was produced using Unreal Engine 5, and was described as the first Chinese animated series to use Unreal Engine 5 throughout its production process.

=== The World of Immortals ===
An animated adaptation of The World of Immortals premiered on Tencent Video on 29 October 2024. The series was broadcast weekly on Tuesdays, with Tencent Video as its exclusive streaming platform. The first season consists of 26 episodes.

=== Beyond the Deep Space ===
An animated adaptation of Beyond the Deep Space premiered on Bilibili on 16 January 2026. The series was released weekly, with three episodes premiering on the first day, and its first season consists of 26 episodes.

The animated series, adapted from Chen Dong's novel, began airing on Bilibili in early 2026.

== Bibliography ==
| Work | Chinese title | Serialization |
|---|---|---|
| Undying and Immortal | 不死不灭 | 2004–2006 |
| Tomb of Fallen Gods | 神墓 | 2006–2008 |
| The World of Immortals | 长生界 | 2008–2010 |
| Shrouding the Heavens | 遮天 | 2010–2013 |
| Perfect World | 完美世界 | 2013–2016 |
| The Sacred Ruins | 圣墟 | 2016–2021 |
| Beyond the Deep Space | 深空彼岸 | 2021–2023 |
| Night Without Bounds | 夜无疆 | 2024–present |

Beyond the Deep Space was completed on 2 June 2023. Chen Dong's next novel, Night Without Bounds, was uploaded to Qidian on 6 September 2024.

== Awards and honors ==
- Second place on the 2014 China Online Writers Rich List, with reported royalties of 28 million yuan.
- Third place on the following China Online Writers Rich List, with reported royalties of 38 million yuan.
- 2019 Mao Dun Literature Newcomer Award – Web Literature Newcomer Award.
- Qidian platinum-level writer and member of the China Writers Association.
- Ranked among the leading Chinese web novelists on the China Online Writers Rich List.
