= Er Gen =

Chinese web novelist

Er Gen (Chinese: 耳根; pinyin: Ěrgēn; born 1982), whose real name is Liu Yong (刘勇), is a Chinese web novelist known for writing xianxia fiction. His works include Renegade Immortal, Pursuit of the Truth, I Shall Seal the Heavens, and A Will Eternal. His novel I Shall Seal the Heavens won the male fiction category of the 2015 Forbes China Original Literature Ranking. In 2016, he became one of the first five web writers elected to the National Committee of the China Writers Association.

== Early life ==
Er Gen was born in Heilongjiang, China, in 1982. He graduated from the English Department of Heilongjiang University and worked as an English teacher in Mudanjiang before becoming a novelist.

== Career ==
Er Gen began writing online fiction in 2009 while working as a teacher. He later left teaching to become a full-time writer. He said that he began writing because he enjoyed reading online novels and wanted to tell stories of his own.

His first novel, Tian Ni (天逆), was an urban fantasy story of more than 700,000 Chinese characters. It attracted few readers. An editor at Qidian encouraged him to try writing xianxia fiction, and he began his second novel, Renegade Immortal (仙逆).

Renegade Immortal also had a difficult beginning. After Er Gen had written about 40,000 characters, some readers compared the early part of the novel to Wang Yu's A Record of a Mortal's Journey to Immortality. Er Gen later said that he read Wang Yu's novel after receiving these comments and found some similarities. He continued writing, but the novel still had few readers after three months and more than one million characters. The completed novel eventually reached more than 6.5 million characters.

The novel became more popular during the "Mortal Transformation" (化凡) part of the story. Er Gen said that he had written this section in a style closer to prose and added his own thoughts about life. Some readers first complained about the slower pace, but the section later received more positive responses. He also said that he had not planned the story with a detailed outline. Instead, he developed the plot while writing and used some of his own feelings and experiences when creating the characters.

Renegade Immortal takes place in a large fictional universe, with events set in different periods of time. Its story includes the archaic and ancient eras, with characters and events linked across time and space. In November 2015, the novel was reported to have received more than 40 million clicks, over 300,000 bookmarks, and more than 700 million legitimate reading views on Qidian.

Er Gen went on to write Pursuit of the Truth (求魔), I Shall Seal the Heavens (我欲封天), and A Will Eternal (一念永恒). He said that he wanted to explore different themes in these works. Renegade Immortal focused on emotion, Pursuit of the Truth on the search for truth, I Shall Seal the Heavens on playful elements, and A Will Eternal on humor.

In 2014, Er Gen ranked fourth on the ninth China Online Writers Rich List, with reported royalties of 25 million yuan. His novels also attracted readers who gave large donations through Qidian. Some of these readers were known as "Alliance Masters" (盟主). A 2016 report stated that the number of Alliance Masters supporting his work had grown to more than 500.

I Shall Seal the Heavens was one of the most popular web novels in China in 2015. It topped Qidian's monthly ticket rankings for several months and won the male fiction category of the 2015 Forbes China Original Literature Ranking. The awards were announced in Shanghai on 6 January 2016.

In 2016, Er Gen was elected to the Ninth National Committee of the China Writers Association. He was one of five web writers elected to the committee for the first time, alongside Xue Hong, Tang Jia San Shao, Tian Can Tu Dou, and Tiao Wu.

Er Gen said that he usually wrote about 6,000 Chinese characters a day and published two chapters. In a 2016 interview, he explained that he preferred to focus on writing stories that readers enjoyed rather than thinking about film and game adaptations. He also said that he wanted his novels to form a larger fictional world, with links between their stories.

His later novels include San Cun Ren Jian (三寸人间) and Beyond the Timescape (光阴之外), also known as Outside of Time. Beyond the Timescape began publication on Qidian on 12 June 2022 and ended on 4 July 2025, after nearly three years of serialization. The novel has about 4.72 million Chinese characters and follows Xu Qing, a young cultivator living in a dangerous world affected by supernatural forces.

Er Gen was also among the recipients of the Fourth Mao Dun Newcomer Prize for Online Literature (第四届茅盾新人奖·网络文学奖). His name appeared on the official list of winners announced in December 2021, and the award ceremony was held in September 2022.

== Adaptations ==
Er Gen's novel A Will Eternal was adapted into a 2D animated series produced by Tencent Video, which premiered on 12 August 2020. The series was made by Nice Boat Animation (视美影业) and follows Bai Xiaochun, a young man who begins learning cultivation. It became one of Tencent Video's long-running animated series. Er Gen said that he was pleased with how the animation followed the original novel and that he had discussed the adaptation with its production team.

The series was later discussed as an example of the growth of Chinese 2D animation. A 2021 article in The Beijing News examined its production and the challenges of making long-running 2D animated series in China.

Renegade Immortal was adapted into a 3D animated series produced by Tencent Video and animated by Sparkly Key Animation (铸梦动画). It premiered on 25 September 2023 and follows Wang Lin, a young man who begins his journey to immortality after obtaining a mysterious treasure.

Beyond the Timescape was also adapted into a 3D animated series, which premiered on Youku on 28 December 2025. The series was produced by Youku and The Impossible World, with animation by Ian Animation (伊恩动漫) and Feiyu Films (飞鱼映画). It follows Xu Qing as he struggles to survive in a ruined world threatened by gods and strange creatures. Er Gen attended a preview screening and spoke about the adaptation with its production team.

== Bibliography ==
Work	Chinese title	Serialization
Tian Ni	天逆	2009–2010
Renegade Immortal	仙逆	2009–2012
Pursuit of the Truth	求魔	2012–2013
I Shall Seal the Heavens	我欲封天	2014–2016
A Will Eternal	一念永恒	2016–2018
A World Worth Protecting	三寸人间	2018–2021
Beyond the Timescape	光阴之外	2022–2025
