= Lord of Mysteries =

2018 Chinese web novel

- Volume 1 print cover
- Author: Cuttlefish That Loves Diving
- Original title: 诡秘之主
- Translator: Webnovel
- Illustrator: OSSS
- Country: China
- Language: Mandarin Chinese
- Genre: Dark fantasy; Lovecraftian horror; Steampunk; Xuanhuan
- Publisher: Qidian (web serial); China Literature Ltd. (print); Yen Press (English print)
- Published: April 1, 2018 – May 1, 2020 (web serial); 2020 – present (print)
- Published in English: July 29, 2025 – present
- Media type: Web novel, print
- No. of books: 2
- OCLC: 1517658409
- Followed by: Circle of Inevitability
- Website: Web serial; English web serial; English print

Lord of Mysteries (Chinese: 诡秘之主; pinyin: Guǐ Mì Zhī Zhǔ) is a Chinese web novel written by Yuan Ye/Cuttlefish That Loves Diving. Serialized on Qidian from 2018 to 2020, the story blends steampunk, Lovecraftian horror, and xuanhuan elements in a Victorian era-inspired world.

== Plot ==
The story begins in the year 1349 of the Fifth Epoch, on 28 June. Zhou Mingrui (周明瑞; Zhōu Míngruì), a Chinese youth, transmigrates into the body of a university graduate, Klein Moretti,. He attempts to find out why the original Klein committed suicide while also trying to return home. He has found himself in a world reminiscent of late Victorian England. Here, people with mystical powers are called Beyonders. After reproducing a ritual that appears to have caused his transmigration, he poses as a god-like entity and forms an organization known as the "Tarot Club". He later becomes an official Beyonder, one who is affiliated with the story's Seven Orthodox Churches.

== Release history ==
=== Chinese original version ===
The novel was serialized on Qidian from April 2018 to May 2020.

No.	Title	Release date	ISBN
1	小丑; Xiǎochǒu; "The Clown"	April 1, 2018 – July 6, 2018	—
2	无面人; Wúmiànrén; "The Faceless"	July 8, 2018 – November 18, 2018	—
3	旅行家; Lǚxíngjiā; "The Traveler"	November 21, 2018 – April 3, 2019	—
4	不死者; Bùsǐzhě; "The Undying"	April 6, 2019 – August 2, 2019	—
5	红祭司; Hóngjìsī; "The Red Priest"	August 6, 2019 – November 30, 2019	—
6	逐光者; Zhúguāngzhě; "The Lightseeker"	December 4, 2019 – February 12, 2020	—
7	倒吊人; Dàodiàorén; "The Hanged Man"	February 16, 2020 – April 5, 2020	—
8	愚者; Yúzhě; "The Fool"	April 9, 2020 – May 1, 2020	—

=== English translation version ===
Yen Press is releasing the novels in print in English.

No.	Title	Release date	ISBN
1	The Clown, Part I	July 29, 2025	979-885541377-9
2	The Clown, Part II	December 9, 2025	979-885541427-1
3	The Clown, Part III	May 12, 2026	979-885541428-8
4	The Faceless, Part I	September 8, 2026	979-885541429-5
5	The Faceless, Part II	February 9, 2027	979-885544201-4

== Reception ==
The novel amassed a large fandom among Chinese and English speakers. It was ranked #1 on Qidian's popularity rankings for several consecutive months. As of 2023, it had tens of millions of readers.

Fans of the series frequently discussed fan theories regarding the protagonist and his abilities, which the author directly engaged with online, sometimes by confirming fan speculation or by redirecting them. He also incorporated reader feedback into future instalments of the series.

In 2019, it was one of the 144 web novels collected by the National Library of China. It was collected by the British Library in 2022.

== Adaptations ==
=== Animated series ===
Lord of Mysteries, the Chinese animated series adaptation produced by B.CMAY PICTURES, was streamed on WeTV and Crunchyroll. The series was directed by Xiong Ke with Yuan Ye serving as the series writer.

=== Manhua ===
A manhua began serialization on January 21, 2020, and was published on Bilibili Manhua. A translation is available on the web novel. A new adaptation began serialization in 2025 and was published on Tencent Animation and Comics.

=== Video game ===
As of 2024, a multi-platform RPG titled Lord of the Mysteries is in development using Unreal Engine 5.
