= Reverend Insanity =

Chinese xianxia web novel by Gu Zhen Ren

- Cover of the original Qidian serialization
- Author: Gu Zhen Ren
- Original title: 蛊真人
- Language: Chinese
- Genre: Xianxia, dark fantasy
- Publisher: Qidian
- Publication date: 2012–2019
- Publication place: China
- English publication date: 2019
- Media type: Web novel
- Pages: 2,334 chapters

Reverend Insanity (Chinese: 蛊真人; pinyin: Gǔ Zhēn Rén), originally titled Gu Zhen Ren and also rendered in English as Daoist Gu and Gu Daoist Master, is a Chinese xianxia web novel written by Gu Zhen Ren, whose pen name is identical to the novel's original title. It was serialized on the online platform Qidian from 2012 until its removal in 2019, and comprises 2,334 chapters across six volumes. The published text stops immediately before its final battle, and no ending has ever been written. In 2019 the novel was removed from Chinese platforms during a national campaign against online literature, and officials cited content promoting what they described as unhealthy values of violence, cruelty, and extreme individualism.

The novel follows Fang Yuan (方源), a transmigrator from modern Earth who has already lived five hundred years in the story's world when it opens. Facing destruction at the hands of an alliance of "righteous path" forces, he activates the time-reversing Spring Autumn Cicada (春秋蝉) and wakes in his fifteen-year-old body with five centuries of memories intact. Across his second life he pursues a single objective, eternal life, through scheming and cultivation and an unconstrained willingness to sacrifice anyone who stands in its way. Power in the setting revolves around gu (蛊), living creatures described in the work's tagline as "the true essence of heaven and earth", each of which grants exactly one ability to the cultivator who refines and wields it.

The work is noted for its amoral villain protagonist, a deliberate inversion of xianxia conventions that the author set out in the preface to the serialization, and Fang Yuan has become one of Chinese web fiction's best-known villains. The character's values were central to the official case for removing the novel. The literary portal of the state-run newspaper Guangming Daily had already assessed the book in 2017 as the strongest work of the "dark school" of web fiction since Yan Yu Jiangnan's Xiedu (亵渎, 2003), and warned its readers that the author's own outlook should not be confused with that of his protagonist.

After its removal from Qidian, the novel developed a substantial international readership through unofficial fan translations, and an official English edition ran on Webnovel. Domestic discussion of the book survived its ban, and in a 2024 fan ballot conducted by Qidian the author's subsequent novel took first place in what Chinese media described as a demonstration of the persistence of the book's readership.

== Plot ==
The novel is told in the third person and follows a single protagonist across two lifetimes. Its six published volumes are summarised below in order.

=== Volume 1: Demonic Nature Never Changes (199 chapters) ===
The narrative opens at the end of Fang Yuan's first life. A transmigrator from modern Earth, he has spent five hundred years in the Gu World rising from a junior of the Gu Yue clan to a feared overlord of the demonic path. Encircled on a mountain summit by the sects of the righteous path and denounced for the slaughter he committed to refine his signature gu, he detonates the Spring Autumn Cicada and tears his soul back five hundred years into his fifteen-year-old body on Qing Mao Mountain in the Southern Border.

The mountain is held by three villages of Gu Masters, the Gu Yue, the Bai and the Xiong, whose fortunes rest on a spirit spring beneath the Gu Yue caverns that produces primeval stones. At the Aperture Opening Ceremony Fang Yuan tests as a grade-C talent, the same verdict that humiliated him the first time, while his twin brother Fang Zheng is judged superior and taken into a senior clansman's household. Rather than accept the clan's charity he works from memory. He baits the three-hundred-year-old trail of the Flower Wine Monk, a demonic Gu Master killed in the clan's own history, with jars of green bamboo wine, and the wine bug he catches as a vital gu leads him to the corpse, the inheritance, and a recording gu whose wall replays the truth of how the clan's venerated fourth patriarch actually died.

What follows is the novel's demonstration of method. Fang Yuan kills a merchant's son in the hidden cave and frames a rival family; he extorts primeval stones from classmates and cultivates the reputation the clan expects while robbing it in silence. When a wolf tide breaks over the mountain in the same season that a fifth-revolution constable arrives to investigate the murders, the two crises collide: the clan's first ancestor rises as a blood corpse, the mountain begins to collapse, and Fang Yuan refines the man-beast burial gu by sacrificing a child of the clan before seizing the yin-yang rebirth gu to drag the dying Bai Ning Bing back to life and into a woman's body under his control. He leaves the ruins of his own home with the inheritance of White Bone Mountain, taken while impersonating his brother.

=== Volume 2: The Demonic Youth Leaves the Mountain (206 chapters) ===
The caravans that cross the Ten Thousand Mountains are the only artery of the Southern Border, and Fang Yuan travels out with one, under the alias Hei Tu, attaching himself to the Shang trading family and shielding its young mistress Shang Xin Ci from the politics of her own house while the road lets him rebuild his cultivation in the open. The volume's centrepiece is the decennial opening of the Three Kings blessed land, where three inheritances left by dead Gu Immortals and the tortoise land spirit that administers them draw every power in the region, all of them racing a land that is visibly collapsing.

It is here that Fang Yuan suffers the first serious defeat of his second life. Betrayed by Bai Ning Bing and the Tie family and taken prisoner with his prize in reach, he detonates the Spring Autumn Cicada a second time rather than lose everything. The Spring autumn cicada sends him back a few days so Fang Yuan can plan around the betrayal. Instead of refining the second aputure gu like his original plan, he instead refines the Fixed Immortal Travel gu and just barely escapes. Using this gu he emerges at the Hu Immortal blessed land in Central Continent, using Fixed Immortal Travel gu to defeat his competitors, and takes the blessed land and its Soul Shaking Mountain for himself, the first base of operations in the novel that is genuinely his.

=== Volume 3: The Demon Plunges the World into Chaos (244 chapters) ===
Fang Yuan spends his early years in the Hu Immortal blessed land converting it into an industrial base, purging the stone people of Soul Shaking Mountain when they obstruct his monopoly and farming the land's resources through the world's gu exchange. A calamity beyond his preparation drives him north: he transmits to the Northern Plains, kills the steppe hero Chang Shan Yin, takes the dead man's face and name, and becomes the wolf king that a tribal confederation needs, herding a great pack of wolves through the rivalries of the grasslands and into the decennial contest for the imperial court.

That contest opens the blessed land of Giant Sun Immortal Venerable and the Eighty-Eight Cornered True Yang Building (八十八角真阳楼), the treasure house the dead Venerable built for his blood descendants, administered by the Venerable's own will. Fang Yuan descends into it with a copy of its blueprints obtained from the Lang Ya blessed land, exploits the knowledge he carried over from his first life, and walks out with the volume's decisive prize, the ninth-revolution Wisdom Gu, along with the forced ascension of the gu immortal Tai Bai Yun Sheng and an eighth-revolution luck gu that ends up in the hands of the slave-born Ma Hong Yun. He sabotages the building as he leaves and brings it down; a symbol of the Northern Plains falls, the region reorganises around the loss, and Fang Yuan ascends to Gu Immortal status in the ruin he made.

=== Volume 4: The Demon Lord Roams Unfettered (372 chapters) ===
The fourth volume is where the protagonist stops being a talented mortal and becomes an institution. Its centrepiece is the war at Yi Tian Mountain, four conflicts layered on one battlefield: a mortal free-for-all staged for reputation, a Gu Immortal battle over an eighth-revolution immortal gu house, Shadow Sect's ritual to refine the Supreme Immortal Fetus gu (至尊仙胎蛊) with ten extreme physiques as its sacrificial foci, and the two rival designs of Shadow Sect and Heavenly Court underneath them all. Fang Yuan has by now lost his original body and is living as an immortal zombie, a dead man whose cultivation cannot advance.

He survives by the only route open to him. In the final hour of the battle he swaps souls with Ying Wu Xie and takes the Supreme Immortal Fetus gu out of the ritual, and the body it grows for him is something the world has no place for. He becomes a complete Otherworldly Demon: a being of no lineage and no place in the world's destined order, immune to the Fate Gu's killing move and able to cultivate every path at once, since the dao marks he accumulates no longer conflict with one another. The gu has a cost that shapes the rest of the novel, since it must be fed by devouring immortal apertures of a matching revolution, and so his advancement becomes a campaign of swallowing other people's worlds whole. When the head of Shadow Sect dies, the sect itself falls to him, and the zombie alliance that had been its instrument is spent in the process.

=== Volume 5: The Demon King Reigns Supreme (945 chapters) ===
The longest volume opens at Fang Yuan's lowest ebb and ends with him remaking the world's politics. As an immortal zombie his cultivation is frozen and he is hunted across five regions, and two set pieces define the volume. The first is the Reverse Flow River, a secret realm in which no gu may be used, the current runs against every thought of progress, and the river itself has no end; by walking upstream for as long as it takes he refines the Perseverance gu (坚持仙蛊) inside his own body and becomes only the second master of the river in history, after Primordial Lotus Immortal Venerable of Heavenly Court.

The second is the Fate Gu. Through the long middle of the novel Heavenly Court has been restoring the ninth-revolution Fate Gu it has guarded since antiquity, the object through which destiny is administered over all living things, and Fang Yuan leads coalitions of the regions against it twice. In the second assault he reaches the tower where it is kept and shatters it with his own hands. The world does not end. The walls between the five regions dissolve, qi tides sweep the two heavens, the hidden grotto-heavens of past ages stand suddenly exposed, and the Venerables of history begin returning through the arrangements they left behind, so that the novel's politics become a war of the dead conducted by their surviving schemes.

=== Volume 6: The Demon Venerable Lives Eternal (368 chapters) ===
With destiny broken, the last volume is a race among the revived Venerables for the two conditions of immortality, the Primordial Realm (元境), which holds the secrets of every cultivation path, and the Ice of Facts (事实浮冰), which can rewrite the world's laws. Fang Yuan walks into the Mad Demon Cave (疯魔窟), the ruin built by an ancient Venerable to deduce the workings of heaven, and comes out of its ninth layer as a Venerable of the refinement path, the first living person to hold that rank in the modern era.

He proclaims himself the Great Love Immortal Venerable, a name his enemies answer with Heaven Refining Demon Venerable, and founds the Heaven and Earth One Family Great Love Alliance (天地一家大爱联盟) from the Eastern Sea at the age of fifty-seven. Its currency is access to him: he will refine any gu up to the eighth revolution for anyone who can pay the price, which makes him the hub of the world's economy and the patron of its non-human peoples, and his rhetoric of harmony among the five regions borrows the language of the long-dead Paradise Earth Immortal Venerable, whose last wishes he claims to have received. Three Venerables now stand over the world, and the novel's final published movement is the convergence of Fang Yuan, Star Constellation Immortal Venerable and Giant Sun Immortal Venerable on Heavenly Court itself. The text breaks off there, mid-battle, with the eternal life that has driven the protagonist across two lifetimes still unwon.

== Setting ==
The novel is set in the Gu World, where power derives from gu (蛊), sentient creatures described by the work's recurring tagline as "the true essence of heaven and earth" to humanity's "spirit of all living things". A gu grants exactly one ability, from blades of moonlight to time reversal and the manipulation of destiny. Gu occur in the wild and must be located, subdued, refined, fed, and combined by their users; because prime materials and wild gu are finite, the world's economy and its wars are driven by scarcity.

Human cultivators, known as Gu Masters, awaken an aperture (Chinese: 空窍; pinyin: kōngqiào), an inner space that stores the primeval essence used to activate gu. Cultivation is divided into nine revolutions (转; the official English translation renders these as ranks): the first to the fifth revolutions are mortal Gu Masters, while the sixth revolution and above denotes Gu Immortals, who cultivate immortal essence, wield Immortal Gu, and open personal pocket dimensions whose environments reflect their owners' cultivation, known as blessed lands and, at higher revolutions, grotto-heavens. The world's underlying physics are expressed through "dao marks" (道痕), traces of the great paths that permeate matter and living beings.

Cultivation is further organised into "paths", among them blood, soul, wisdom, luck, time, formation, refinement, and transformation, each with its own methods and resources, and expert cultivators combine multiple gu into "killer moves" whose effects exceed the sum of their parts. At the summit of history stand the ten Venerables: five Immortal Venerables and five Demon Venerables, ninth-revolution masters of the orthodox and demonic paths, ten in all across the whole of the setting's recorded history. A gu's power is not fixed: the same creature refined at a higher revolution produces a stronger effect, and the novel's fights turn as often on preparation, information, and resource depletion as on raw strength.

Geographically, the world comprises five major regions, Southern Border, Northern Plains, Eastern Sea, Western Desert, and Central Continent, initially separated by regional walls, along with two heavens above. The deep past is framed by The Legends of Ren Zu (人祖传), an in-world origin myth of the first human and his ten children, from which the novel regularly quotes.

=== The Legends of Ren Zu ===
The Legends of Ren Zu is a text within the novel, presented as an inherited myth of the first human and the first gu, and quoted in fragments throughout. Its episodes give allegorical form to abstract concepts by making each of them a gu: hope, wisdom, belief, doubt, attitude, and courage are all creatures that Ren Zu encounters, captures, or loses, and the parables double as a philosophical commentary on the main narrative. Because the myth describes a legendary tenth-revolution Eternal Life Gu (永生蛊), the in-world rumour that drives much of the plot's later search for immortality originates in it, and the text turns out to conceal a hidden inheritance as well as a doctrine.

The work cites the myth as scripture, by chapter and section, in the form 《人祖传》第三章第一节有载 ("The Legends of Ren Zu, chapter three, section one, records"); the tales themselves carry no titles in the text. They begin with the first human beset by beasts called Predicament (困境), who feeds three gu on his own youth in exchange for their help and so gains Hope (希望蛊). They continue through his children, dug from his own eyes as a son and daughter, Tai Ri Yang Mang (太日阳莽) and Gu Yue Yin Huang (古月阴荒), and through later offspring such as Bei Ming Bing Po and Da Li Zhen Wu, whose names recur in the constitutions of characters in the main narrative. The clan whose junior the protagonist begins the novel as carries the surname Gu Yue, an apparent allusion the text itself does not spell out.

=== Otherworldly Demons and the order of destiny ===
The world is populated by human tribes it regards as native, and by the Otherworldly Demons (天外之魔), beings who entered it from outside and whose bodies carry no blood relation to any lineage within it. Transmigrators are Otherworldly Demons, and the setting treats them as a standing threat to the Fate Gu, because a being with no place in the world's destined order cannot be wholly governed by it. This is the mechanism behind the novel's ending: the Supreme Immortal Fetus gu, refined over a hundred thousand years, is designed to produce a complete Otherworldly Demon, and Fang Yuan is the creature it produces.

Beneath the world lies the Life and Death Gate (生死门), a ruin of the same order as the river of time whose three trials form the novel's most quoted sequence. Soul Shaking Mountain (荡魂山) strengthens the soul of a cultivator who climbs it, Fallen Soul Valley (落魄谷) refines that soul through a wind that strips memory and identity, and the Reverse Flow River (逆流河) reverses the will of anyone who enters it, so that the only way forward is to keep walking against a current that punishes every step. The three together carry a cultivator from the edge of death to the threshold of immortality, and they are the setting's clearest statement of the novel's premise that power is a function of endurance rather than of talent.

== Characters ==
The cast spans two lifetimes and five regions. The figures below are the principal ones.

=== Fang Yuan ===
Fang Yuan (方源) is the protagonist and one of the best-known villain protagonists in Chinese web fiction. A transmigrator from modern Earth, his five hundred years of first life, concluded in defeat, leave him with a cold utilitarian worldview in which relationships, morality, and reputation are instruments, and only the goal of eternal life is absolute. Across two lifetimes he is by turns clan junior, demonic cultivator, immortal zombie, sect master, and, by the story's end, a Demon Venerable of the ninth revolution. In the later volumes, strands of his soul operate independently across the world as split bodies bearing their own names and identities. His self-assumed honorific, Great Love Immortal Venerable, is an ironic counterpoint to the title his enemies use for him, and has become an alternative name for the novel among its readers. In the last third of the novel he is less a body than a network: his original flesh becomes the split body He Chunqiu, a time-path immortal who tends the Spring Autumn Cicada, while the dragonman Wushuai, ancestor of a new race of dragonmen, and the qi-path elder Qihai represent him in the Northern Plains and inside Heavenly Court respectively, each cultivating a path of his own and answering to the same will.

=== Mortal era (volumes 1–2) ===
Fang Zheng (方正) is Fang Yuan's younger twin brother and his earliest foil. Blessed with the aptitude Fang Yuan lacks, he is adopted by the supervisor Gu Yue Dong Tu and later inducted into the righteous-path Immortal Crane Sect; the widening gulf between the brothers dramatises the novel's contrast between institutional favour and solitary self-reliance. By the final war he serves among the orthodox immortals.

Bai Ning Bing (白凝冰) is a young genius of the Bai family born with the Northern Dark Ice Soul constitution (北冥冰魄体), one of the setting's Ten Extreme Physiques (十绝体), a rare constitution that eclipses ordinary aptitude. The bearer's long, ambivalent companionship with Fang Yuan, rival, ally, and subordinate by turns, stretches from the clan academy to the immortal world.

Tie Xue Leng (铁血冷) is the Southern Border's feared "Divine Constable"; his daughter Tie Ruo Nan (铁若男) follows him onto the path. Their investigation of the horrors that trail Fang Yuan out of Qing Mao Mountain makes them his first professional adversaries.

Shang Xin Ci (商心慈) is a kind-hearted young merchant of the Shang trading empire, whose caravan Fang Yuan joins in the second volume; her clan is ruled by the fifth-revolution master Shang Yan Fei (商燕飞), one of the Southern Border's overlords.

The Flower Wine Monk legacy, the inheritance of a long-dead demonic Gu Master hidden on Qing Mao Mountain, gives Fang Yuan his first decisive windfall.

=== Immortal era (volumes 3–4) ===
Hei Lou Lan (黑楼兰) is a Northern Plains champion of the Great Strength True Martial Physique (大力真武体), another of the Ten Extreme Physiques, who passes from rival to one of Fang Yuan's immortal lieutenants; after Fang Yuan, Hei Lou Lan is among the most frequently appearing characters in the novel.

Feng Jiu Ge (凤九歌), a master Gu Immortal introduced at the opening of volume 3, remains a fixture of the era's great contests through the final war, in which he clashes directly with Duke Long.

Tai Bai Yun Sheng (太白云生) is an elderly, neutral-aligned time-path Gu Immortal of the Northern Plains, unattached to either the righteous or the demonic path, who cultivates time path for healing and cloud path for offence. His hard-won friendship with Fang Yuan becomes one of the story's warmest relationships, and his fate is among the novel's most consequential losses.

Ying Wu Xie (影无邪) is an artificial dream-path extreme physique and core member of Shadow Sect, born from a dream realm by Old Man Yan Shi (砚石老人) with a total lifespan of eighteen hours, his cultivation rising one revolution every two hours as his death approaches. He serves as one of Fang Yuan's darkest mirrors in the struggle over Spectral Soul's inheritance.

Two land spirits anchor much of Fang Yuan's immortal career: the fox spirit of the Hu Immortal blessed land (狐仙福地), whose inheritance he seizes, and the eccentric, recipe-collecting Lang Ya land spirit (琅琊地灵), custodian of the refinement-path legend Long Hair Ancestor's legacy.

Fairy Zi Wei (紫薇仙子), a wisdom-path immortal of the Spirit Affinity Pavilion well over a thousand years old, is Heavenly Court's principal strategist.

=== The great era (volumes 5–6) ===
Ma Hong Yun (马鸿运) is a slave-born steppe fortune-seeker who rises to lord of the imperial court on the strength of sworn generals such as Chang Shan Yin. He dies in the final age with his soul in Fang Yuan's keeping.

Zhao Lian Yun (赵怜云), Ma Hong Yun's wife, celebrated in Fang Yuan's foreknowledge as a future wisdom-path immortal, seeks the ninth-revolution Love Gu to reclaim her husband's soul from Fang Yuan.

Qin Ding Ling (秦鼎菱), once supreme elder of the Heaven's Envy Tower and forced from the verge of joining Heavenly Court into becoming Giant Sun Immortal Venerable's empress, reappears in the final age as a luck-path immortal bearing a gambit created to counter her former lord.

Duke Long (龙公) is Heavenly Court's ancient dragon immortal, who combined refinement and transformation paths to create the dragonman race under the ideal of "every man a dragon"; in the final war he stands against Feng Jiu Ge.

=== Venerables ===
The ten Venerables are the ninth-revolution summit of the setting's history, five Immortal Venerables of the orthodox path and five Demon Venerables of the demonic path.

Star Constellation Immortal Venerable (星宿仙尊), founder of wisdom path and one of Heavenly Court's ancient rulers, is the orthodox side's first and formative Venerable; her arrangements, made long before the story's present, govern much of its endgame.

Red Lotus Demon Venerable (红莲魔尊), born Hong Ting (洪亭), was a prodigy groomed by Heavenly Court who rebelled against the cruelty of the Fate Gu. Cultivating time path and repeatedly rebirthed through the Spring Autumn Cicada, he became a Demon Venerable of the Olden Antiquity Era and achieved what no Venerable before him had, damaging the Fate Gu and fracturing destiny itself.

Spectral Soul Demon Venerable (幽魂魔尊), the progenitor of soul path, survives as a remnant soul, and his Shadow Sect (影宗) operates across the five regions; Fang Yuan steps into its inheritance and takes the sect over.

Giant Sun Immortal Venerable (巨阳仙尊), founder of luck path and the ancient patron of the Northern Plains' imperial court, is the ancestor from whom the steppe's ruling bloodline descends; his descendants and arrangements drive the Northern Plains arcs.

=== Factions ===
The mortal era belongs to the Gu Yue clan of Qing Mao Mountain and the rival powers of the Southern Border, notably the Bai family and the Shang merchant empire. The immortal era adds the tribes and imperial court of the Northern Plains, the Lang Ya Sect seated on its blessed land, the cross-regional Shadow Sect, and the zombie-immortal underworld of the Zombie Alliance (僵盟). At the orthodox summit stands Heavenly Court (天庭), served by the ten great ancient sects of Central Continent, of which the Spirit Affinity Pavilion (灵缘斋) and the Heaven's Envy Tower (天妒楼) are named in the text. At the opposite pole are the ten Venerables of history, whose legacies the living inherit and contest.

== Themes ==
In the preface to the serialization, titled "Either Toward Success, or Toward Destruction" (不是走向成功，就是走向毁灭), Gu Zhen Ren described several months of personal hardship and what he called a widening imbalance between reality and the inner life, then recalled reading web fiction five or six years earlier and accumulating a sense of blockage at novels whose protagonists were "favoured by fortune, upright, and high-minded" while their villains were stupid, mad, and ugly, "paper tigers" that collapsed on contact with the hero. He wanted to see one real great villain: solitary, proud and dark, decisive in killing and never weak-kneed, who "never conceals his own evil and has absolutely no hypocritical good". The same wish, he wrote, had produced the pen name he registered on Qidian some six years earlier, and the novel itself was begun against the background of the end-of-the-world predictions then circulating for 2012, on the reasoning that life does not wait for all its conditions to be favourable. The preface closes on the line that gives it its title, describing such a figure as either heading toward success or toward destruction. The result is a work that reviewers in China and abroad treat as the leading example of the villain-protagonist mode in Chinese web fiction, and one whose moral position is the first thing any assessment has to address. The Guangming Net critic's warning to readers was explicit on this point: in a dark work, the author's values are not the values of the characters he depicts, and the horror of the narrative is not offered for emulation. The author made the same distinction himself in the first line of his preface, where the intended figure is described from the outside as something to be watched rather than followed.

The novel's central ideological axis is individualism versus collectivism. Its demonic path is not mere criminality but a doctrine of radical self-reliance, set against the clans, sects, and celestial bureaucracy of the righteous path, which the narrative repeatedly reveals to be equally self-interested beneath its moral language. The Guangming Net review, written while the novel was still running, located the book at the end of a wider shift in the genre's readership toward protagonists who are self-centred, who repay grudges, and who kill decisively, and treated the novel as the fullest recent expression of that turn. This radical individualism is precisely the aspect regulators singled out in banning the work, citing "extreme individualism" as one of the objectionable values it was found to promote.

A second axis is freedom versus fate. The world is governed by destiny through the Fate Gu, and the protagonist's rebellion is metaphysical as much as social: Red Lotus Demon Venerable's ancient assault on destiny, carried to completion in the novel's final war, frames the story's climax. A third is the relationship of the individual to an economy of scarcity. Because gu and the materials needed to feed them are finite, the novel's conflicts are frequently settled by logistics, contracts, auctions, and negotiated scarcity rather than by duels, an emphasis that distinguishes it from the wider genre.

Interleaved through the narrative are excerpts from The Legends of Ren Zu, whose parables about the first human and the gu embodying hope, wisdom, desire, and courage serve as a philosophical counterpoint to the main narrative while also functioning as a plot device.

The work's style is marked by long, scheme-driven story arcs, systematic attention to economics and logistics, and frequent verse. Its official synopsis opens by paraphrasing the opening couplet of Mao Zedong's 1935 poem on the Loushan Pass campaign, rendering 雄关漫道真如铁，而今迈步从头越 as 雄山漫道真如铁，如今迈步从头越.

=== Style and structure ===
The novel is built as a sequence of long arcs, each placing its protagonist in a regional power structure he is too weak to fight and must therefore learn to use: the clan on Qing Mao Mountain, the merchant caravans of the Southern Border, the tribal confederations of the Northern Plains, the sect politics of the immortal world, and finally the open war of the Venerables. Fang Yuan's advantage in every arc is information rather than strength, since he arrives in each setting already knowing how it ends for the people in it, and the narrative is consequently driven as much by logistics as by combat: contracts, auctions, breeding programmes, the supply of primeval stones, and the feeding requirements of his own stored creatures settle more of the plot than duels do.

The prose is punctuated by verse, and the work's clearest structural signature is the interleaving of The Legends of Ren Zu into the main text. The myth is quoted in fragments at intervals, and its parables of the first human's encounters with hope, wisdom, belief, doubt, and attitude operate simultaneously as commentary on the chapter that follows them, as foreshadowing, and, in time, as the in-world documentation of the gu the characters are hunting.

The Guangming Net review, published while the novel was still being serialized, registered the risks in that method. It observed that darkness and mere sensation-seeking sit one step apart, that a book already dividing its readers could slide across that line, and that the aggressive register of the early volumes eases as the story's system widens and its map grows.

== The gu in Chinese tradition ==
The character 蛊 is written with the element for insects (蟲) set over the element for a vessel (皿), and the earliest Chinese glosses treat it as a poison bred rather than found. The Zuo Zhuan records the physician He, consulted in 541 BCE about the illness of the marquis of Jin, explaining the term as "insects in a vessel" and attributing it to excess and confusion rather than to sorcery. The Book of Changes gives gu its own hexagram, Gu (蠱, "Correcting"), and a study by Liu Baozheng argues that the received Confucian reading of that hexagram as meaning "affairs" or "decay" misses its original reference to the ancient poison-breeding belief.

The canonical method attributed to gu in later sources is a survival contest. The thirteenth-century dictionary Liushu Gu describes it as "gathering poisonous insects in a vessel and making them devour one another, and the one that survives alone is the gu, whose poison kills a person at once", and Ming and Qing travel writing repeats the same formula, with the surviving creature then transferred to food or drink. The same essay notes that remedies for gu appear already in the Fifty-Two Recipes for Treating Illnesses recovered from the Mawangdui tomb, that the Records of the Grand Historian records a dog sacrifice against "hot poisonous gu vapour" ordered in 676 BCE, and that the seventh-century medical treatise Zhubing Yuanhou Lun devotes a chapter to gu poisoning with classified symptoms.

Gu accusation is also a documented instrument of politics. The witchcraft calamity of 91 BCE, in which accusations of gu sorcery were used against Emperor Wu of Han's heir and ended in the deaths of the empress and the crown prince, is one of the most consequential episodes in the Book of Han, and Chang Huilin has traced how the Records of the Grand Historian told the story as an event, the Book of Han converted it into a verdict of innocence, and the Zizhi Tongjian reduced it further to a story about wicked ministers.

From the Yuan dynasty onward the accusation migrated, in the written record, toward the non-Han southwest. The Dayuan Yitong Zhi describes the valley and Lao peoples living together around Qingxiang, in present day Quanzhou in Guangxi, keeping venomous snakes as gu, and by the Ming and Qing periods the practice was imputed to Fujian, Guangxi, Gansu, Hunan, Guizhou, and Yunnan in turn. Systematic academic study of the belief in China began in the 1930s, when scholars displaced to the south during the war encountered the subject in the field. Ling Chunsheng and Rui Yifu's Report on an Investigation of the Miao of Western Hunan gave gu extensive treatment, and fieldwork by Deng Qiyao, Lu Qun, and Huang Shijie after 1980 extended it to Yunnan, western Hunan, and Guangxi.

Two strands of modern scholarship bear directly on how the novel uses the term. Rong Zhiyi, who attempted laboratory identification of the substance, argues that the belief had a material basis and that the accusation functioned as a means by which stronger groups and cultures blamed weaker ones. Lu Yangzheng reads the western Hunan "gu woman" as a figure produced by the collapse of matriliny, in which a female practitioner was reconstituted in folklore as something neither fully human nor fully ghost, and the proverb that a gu woman is more dangerous than gods or demons spread through a combination of Miao spirit belief and the imperial policy of indirect rule through local chiefs. Norma Diamond's 1988 study in Ethnology treats gu belief among the Miao as a form of interaction across an ethnic boundary, in which ideas about poison, marriage, and religion encoded the relations between Han and Miao rather than any verified practice. Later Chinese scholarship is distinct on the point that no case of gu poisoning has ever been demonstrated, and that the belief has cost lives through accusation rather than through poison.

The novel borrows the word and discards the ethnography. Its gu are not poisons but the elementary units of the world, each granting a single ability, and the poison-insect imagery survives only in the vocabulary and the exotic charge the term carries. The Guangming Net reviewer noticed this precisely, observing that the word gu inevitably calls to mind the scenery of Miao villages, while the novel in fact follows the orthodox Central Plains mode of cultivation writing and carries very little Miao frontier colouring, its tone belonging instead to the "true person" of its title. The inversion of the traditional material is complete in a second sense as well: in the historical record gu is something one is accused of, while in the novel it is an object of acquisition and stockpiling, and the moral horror the book generates comes not from sorcery but from an economy of scarce living tools.

== Publication history ==
=== Development ===
The novel's original title, Gu Zhen Ren, and its author's pen name are the same string, 蛊真人, literally "gu true person", a formula used in Chinese religious writing for an adept. In the preface, the author explained that he had conceived the name for an imagined villain and adopted it as his Qidian account name years before writing the novel. He later gave the book the same name as a way to fulfil that earlier creative ambition. Gu Zhen Ren published at least four earlier serials. His debut, Moka Yishijie (摩卡异世界), was written when he was about twenty; Haizei Wang zhi Muchao Guoshi (海贼王之母巢国史) was a derivative work based on the Japanese manga One Piece; and Yu Yao Zhi Zun (御妖至尊) and Wuxian Qunfang Pu (无限群芳谱) preceded and overlapped with the early years of the work that made him known.

The conception of Reverend Insanity grew out of the author's years as a reader, and the preface to the serialization states the design directly: the villains of the genre he had been reading were, in his account, paper tigers to be brushed aside by the hero, and he intended to write one who was not. The profile attached to the pen name on Qidian carries no author biography at all: the author field is left empty, and the work is the only introduction he offers.

=== Serialization ===
Serialization began on Qidian in 2012 and continued for nearly seven years, ending with the novel's removal in 2019. The published text runs to 2,334 chapters and is organised into six volumes:

Volume titles of Reverend Insanity
Volume	Chinese title	English title	Chapters	Count
1	魔性不改	Demonic Nature Never Changes	1–199	199
2	魔子出山	The Demonic Youth Leaves the Mountain	200–405	206
3	魔头乱世	The Demon Plunges the World into Chaos	406–649	244
4	魔君纵横	The Demon Lord Roams Unfettered	650–1021	372
5	魔王雄霸	The Demon King Reigns Supreme	1022–1966	945
6	魔尊永生	The Demon Venerable Lives Eternal	1967–2334	368

The six volume totals sum to 2,334 chapters. Chapter counts differ slightly between platforms because some editions fold front matter, announcement chapters, and author's notes into the numbering; the official reading platform WeRead numbers its entries up to 2,361 of that kind, while the story itself ends at the 368th section of the sixth volume, titled 方源、巨阳战星宿 ("Fang Yuan and Giant Sun battle Star Constellation").

The novel was commercially successful during its run. A third-party tracker of Qidian statistics recorded about 7.3 million characters of text, roughly 371,000 reader recommendations, and about 330,000 collections by early 2019, placing it among the platform's substantial properties without ever making it the largest. Qidian marked the book with its Quality Channel badge in 2016 and its Hundred Alliance Lords badge in 2019. It ran for seven years and seven million characters without reaching the front rank of a catalogue of extraordinary scale: Qidian's parent company reported a library of more than 11.7 million works by at least 780,000 signed authors across some 200 content categories, in an industry whose annual output of web fiction had reached 24.4 million works by 2018.

=== Censorship and removal ===
Reverend Insanity was removed from Qidian in 2019 as part of a wider regulatory campaign against online literature, and has never been restored there. In May 2019 the Cyberspace Administration of Shanghai summoned the operators of Qidian over the dissemination of what it characterised as low-quality and pornographic novels and ordered a full rectification; several channels were suspended for seven days, and the platform's available catalogue reportedly fell from about 1.23 million titles to roughly 170,000 during the audit that followed. In August 2019 the Cyberspace Administration of China reported that the campaign had produced 347 leads concerning websites, apps, and authors, resulting in ten criminal and sixty-seven administrative cases and interviews with more than seventy platforms.

International coverage of the campaign describes the removal of roughly 1.2 million titles from Qidian alone, among them some 140,000 xianxia and 350,000 xuanhuan works, and names Reverend Insanity among the most prominent casualties. The campaign extended beyond sexual content: reporting at the time noted that platform editors had struck even individual numbers from manuscripts, among them the number 64, the date of the 1989 Tiananmen Square crackdown. Chinese authorities cited content promoting what they described as unhealthy values of violence, cruelty, and extreme individualism.

The removal was not a suspension. No new chapters have appeared in Chinese since, and the surviving text ends at the opening of its final battle, a fact repeatedly noted in Chinese coverage of the novel's later reputation. The official reading platform of Tencent, WeRead, still carries a catalogue page for the novel marked as withdrawn, so that the work can be found and cannot be opened. Because the novel was never completed and never reinstated, the two facts are usually discussed together in Chinese commentary: readers describe the book as having been deleted cleanly, and its author as having stopped one chapter before the ending he had spent seven years building.

The removal took place inside a national campaign rather than as an isolated editorial decision. In March 2019 the National Office Against Pornographic and Illegal Publications opened the Jingwang 2019 action, which named online literature among its priorities alongside obscene video platforms and illegal live streaming, and the platforms began self-review immediately. Qidian's screening was largely automated: a triggered keyword blocked a work at once, and manual review was available only after the author had revised it. Authors complained of being caught by the filters, and phrases such as "nothing below the neck can be written" and the word "lips" circulated as examples of what had become unsayable. Contemporary industry reporting put the platform's available catalogue at about 170,000 works, down from roughly 1.23 million, as the audit proceeded, a figure compiled by an outside observer rather than published by the regulator. Editors at rival platforms defended the campaign in the same reporting, one of them describing it as ultimately beneficial and another stating that only a handful of vertical channels had been closed and the major categories left intact.

The purge ran alongside a commercial squeeze on the platforms that carried it out. Qidian's parent company reported 2019 revenue of 8.35 billion yuan, up 65.7 per cent, and net profit of 1.11 billion, with copyright operations up 341 per cent to 4.42 billion, while the online business of paid reading, advertising, and games fell 3.1 per cent to 3.71 billion. Monthly paying users had fallen from a peak of 11.8 million in 2017 to 9.8 million in 2019, a paying rate of about 4.5 per cent, and the company's market value had fallen by about two thirds from its high by the time the catalogue was cut. The effect was a platform under simultaneous pressure to convert its library into licensable properties and to clear compliance risk out of everything else, at a moment when the cost of leaving a suspect title online had risen sharply. The China Writers Association's annual blue book recorded the same year as the point at which paid reading stopped growing and free, advertising-supported reading began to displace it, with paying users across the leading platforms falling rather than rising.

=== Translations ===
An official English translation has been published on Webnovel since 2019 and covers all 2,334 chapters. Its translator, who introduces himself on the platform as the work's original translator from his own fan translation site, is one of the readers who carried the novel into English before an edition existed, so that the boundary between the unofficial and official English text is a matter of chronology rather than of personnel. The novel also circulates widely in unofficial fan translations, which became the main route by which its English-language readership formed after the Chinese original was withdrawn from Qidian.

An ongoing unofficial English retranslation by The Omniarch, published through The Omniarch Translation, uses a literary high-fantasy prose style. It renders the Chinese cultivation term 转 as "revolution" rather than "rank". The latter conveys a hierarchical level but does not preserve the term's association with cycles of refinement in Chinese alchemical terminology.

=== The author and later career ===
Gu Zhen Ren writes under a pen name that is identical both to his best-known novel's title and to its central term, 蛊真人, "gu true person". He has never made his legal name public, and the author field on his own platform profile is left empty, so the persona is the only biography his readers have. He wrote four serials before Reverend Insanity, among them a derivative of One Piece, none of which established him; all of the earlier titles are now unavailable on the platform.

His first serial after the removal, Wuxian Xue He (无限血核), ran on Qidian to more than three million characters and concluded in 2024, its final announcement directing readers to the next book. That book, Xian Gong Kai Wu (仙工开物), began on 20 April 2024, is a fantasy of mechanism and puppet craft rather than of gu, and was still running in 2026 at more than three million characters. It reached first place in the platform's 2024 ranking of outstanding web fiction, a result carried by a coordinated vote from readers of the withdrawn novel.

Two institutional recognitions followed. In November 2024 Xian Gong Kai Wu took a silver award in the second "Reading Meets Intangible Cultural Heritage" competition, run jointly by the Prince Gong's Mansion Museum under the Ministry of Culture and Tourism and by Qidian's parent company, with the awards presented at Shanghai Library East and the winning titles accessioned by the library. The company's own ranking of writers includes him among its twelve "Heavenly Kings", its list of model authors of the year. He also appeared among twenty-eight veteran authors interviewed by the platform for its tenth anniversary in 2025, and joined the video platform Bilibili the same year, where his following and the parallel audience he acquired on short-video platforms became part of the 2024 revival of interest in the banned novel.

== Reception ==
=== Chinese reception ===
In July 2017 the literature portal of Guangming Daily selected the novel for its running list of notable xianxia web fiction, in a review published by what was then the state's most prominent literary newspaper platform. The assessment began by positioning the book as the most accomplished work of the "dark school" of web fiction since Yan Yu Jiangnan's Xiedu (亵渎, 2003), and described its protagonist as a man indifferent to social norms and careless of human life, committed to the pursuit of long life, unmoved by temptation and unsoftened by weakness, behind whose surface cruelty the author had concealed a cold examination of human history and society.

The same review registered reservations that anticipated the novel's later fate. It noted that contemporary taste had moved toward self-centred protagonists who repay grudges and kill decisively, that egoism, violence as a route to power, and conspiracy theory had all become stock devices, and that the line between darkness and mere sensation-seeking is thin, so that a book already dividing its readers could easily slip into the latter. It reminded readers explicitly that the three outlooks of an author are not the three outlooks of the characters in his book, and that the horror and depression of the text were aimed at a particular kind of reader rather than recommended as a position. The review's sharpest observation concerns the novel's relationship to its own central term: it remarks that the word gu inevitably brings to mind the scenery of Miao villages, whereas the novel in fact follows the orthodox Central Plains mode of cultivation fiction and carries very little Miao frontier colouring. It also observes that the text becomes steadily less aggressive as it proceeds and its system and map widen, a shift from the moody young man of the opening to the unrestrained old demon of the later volumes.

Chinese discussion after the ban has been shaped by the ban itself. The novel's reputation produced an unusual afterlife in platform culture. In January 2025 a fan ballot held by Qidian for its ranking of outstanding web fiction was carried to the top by Xian Gong Kai Wu, the author's current serial, on the strength of a coordinated campaign by readers of the banned book, a result reported by Chinese media as an expression of the persistence of that readership rather than as a judgement of the new novel, and one in which the platform, the fan communities, and the author all gained attention. The same reporting records the author's standing among Qidian's twelve "Heavenly Kings", an internal list of leading writers on the platform.

Chinese academics were studying the mode the novel belongs to while it was still being serialized. A 2021 analysis of platform data by Zhang Yonglu and Yang Zhiyuan, funded by a national social science project on typological criticism of web fiction, sampled the 2019 and 2020 rankings of Qidian and three other major platforms and identified dark-toned, ruthlessly decisive fiction (暗黑向杀伐果断) as one of the principal currents in Qidian's fantasy listings, in an article whose wider finding is that the genre's traditional heroic mode was in retreat on the same platform. The novel therefore sits at the intersection of two documented records: a commercial one kept by the platforms and their regulators, and an academic one kept by a field that Chinese universities established for the purpose, with dedicated research forums and journals by the end of the 2010s.

=== International readership ===
Outside China the novel is read principally in English through unofficial translations and through the official Webnovel edition, which the platform lists with more than 3,900 reader reviews and a score above four and a half out of five. The novel's removal has been repeatedly discussed in international coverage of online-literature censorship in China, which describes it as among the most prominent works affected by the tightening content regime, and the ban itself drew additional readers to the work.

Reception in English-language reader communities is generally positive on the novel's construction and divided on its morals. Reviewers writing for general audiences credit the book with a villain protagonist who is never rehabilitated by the plot, a magic system in which combat turns on information and preparation rather than raw power, and a willingness to let long-planted details pay off hundreds of chapters later, while criticising the slow middle volumes and the roughness of the early fan translation. The novel is routinely named in English-language discussions of the villain-protagonist mode in Chinese web fiction, and its unfinished state is part of its reputation.

== Readership and fandom ==
The novel's Chinese readership outlived its removal from the commercial platforms. Discussion and annotation continued in spaces the platforms do not control, and the title its readers use most often for the protagonist is not the one his enemies gave him in the text but the one he gave himself, the Great Love Immortal Venerable (大爱仙尊), which they use admiringly and ironically at once.

In the years after the ban the same readership reappeared in public in two forms: as the voters whose turnout in a 2025 platform poll for the author's current serial was read as a statement about the banned book, and as the audience for the fan-supported manhua remake that began running in 2025.

== Adaptations ==
=== Manhua ===
An official manhua adaptation was drawn by the studio Ran Hui Culture and published by Tencent Comics, which lists it as launched on its platform on 26 October 2018 and completed at 101 chapters. Its chapters follow the novel's opening arc in the Gu Yue clan rather than the later immortal era. A separate unofficial remake drawn by Kodoku Studio with fan support began publication in 2025 and remains ongoing.

== See also ==
- Gu (poison)
- Xianxia
- Xuanhuan
- Gods and demons fiction
- List of books banned by governments
- Censorship in China
