= Wang Lin =

Wang Lin may refer to:

- Lin Wang (composer) (born 1976), female Chinese composer
- Wang Lin (general) (526–573), general of the Liang dynasty and Northern Qi
- Wang Fangqing (died 702), Tang dynasty chancellor
- Wang Yanjun (died 935), emperor of the Min state during the Five Dynasties and Ten Kingdoms
- Wang Lin (qigong master) (1952–2017), Chinese qigong practitioner
- Wang Lin (swimmer) (born 1959), retired Chinese swimmer
- Wang Lin (footballer) (born 1987), Chinese footballer
- Wang Lin (badminton) (born 1989), Chinese badminton player
- Wang Lin (politician) (Chinese: 王琳, born 1970), Chinese politician
- Wang Lin, fictional protagonist of the Chinese xianxia web novel Renegade Immortal

== See also ==
- Wang Tian Lin (1928–2010), Chinese screenwriter and actor
- Lin Wang (Asian elephant) (1917–2003), Asian elephant
