= A Record of Mortal's Journey to Immortality =

Chinese web novel

- Book cover for volumes 1-10
- Author: Wang Yu (忘语)
- Original title: A Record of a Mortal's Journey To Immortality (凡人修仙传)
- Language: Chinese
- Genre: Immortal Cultivation, Xianxia (修仙, 仙侠)
- Publisher: Taibai Literature and Art Publishing House of the People's Republic of China
- Publication date: 2010
- Publication place: China
- Media type: Novel
- Pages: 300/pc.
- ISBN: 9787806807583
- Website: Qidian.com

A Record of a Mortal's Journey to Immortality (Chinese: 凡人修仙传; pinyin: Fán rén xiū xiān zhuàn) is a long-running Chinese xianxia serial web novel written by Wang Yu between 2008 and 2013 on Qidian. After its publication, it gradually became one of the most famous fantasy novels about immortal cultivation in Mainland China, a very popular web novel topic in Chinese online literature. In 2010, the book was published as a single volume by Taibai Literature and Art Publishing House, with a total of about 7.71 million characters.

The novel tells the story of the protagonist Han Li, a mortal who born into mediocrity in a fictional world of immortal cultivators but eventually achieved immortality after overcoming hardships. Its English translation is currently being serialized on Wuxiaworld.

== Plot ==
Han Li (Chinese: 韩立; pinyin: Hán lì), a poor and ordinary boy who came from an ordinary mountain village, was recommended by his relatives to join the local Jianghu sect Qixuanmen (Chinese: 七玄門; pinyin: Qī xuán mén). He was chosen by the sect elder Mo Juren (Chinese: 墨居仁; pinyin: Mò jū rén) to become his disciple. He practiced the formula called "Changchun Gong" (Chinese: 長春功; pinyin: Zhǎngchūn gōng) every day. During this period, his suspicions about his master was piqued as his companions started disappearing. In addition, he accidentally got a green medicine bottle that could catalyze herbs, and saved his sect brother Li Feiyu (Chinese: 厲飛雨; pinyin: Lìfēiyǔ) and became his confidant. One day, he had a showdown with his master and was accidentally defeated. He should have been killed by his poisonous hands, but he survived by chance. After learning from his collaborator Yu Zitong that he had mastered a set of immortal cultivation skills and the truth about Mo Juren, he killed him. He wanted to regain his freedom, but after reading his master's suicide note, he found that the poison he had been given had not been completely solved, and he had to travel far to find his family to get the real antidote. After learning about this, Han Li decided to fulfill his master's last wish to save himself, and since then he has embarked on the road of immortal cultivation.

== Works ==
=== Volume 1: The Seven Mysteries Sect ===
Han Li was born in poverty. In order to bring glory to his family, he participated in the assessment of Qixuan Sect in his childhood. Because he had spiritual roots and could practice "Eternal Spring Skill", he was accepted as a disciple by the mysterious Doctor Mo of Qixuan Sect. During this period, Han Li picked up a small bottle that could be used to ripen plants infinitely. Doctor Mo wanted to take over Han Li's body after he had made some progress in practicing the Changchun Skill, but failed. Han Li was also secretly poisoned by him and had to find Doctor Mo's family for an antidote. From then on, he learned about the existence of the world of immortal cultivation.

Not long after, the Qixuan Sect suffered a surprise attack by the Wild Wolf Gang and was facing the crisis of extinction. Han Li stepped forward and showed his skills, destroying the immortal cultivator invited by the leader of the Wild Wolf Gang. He obtained a mysterious sword talisman and a token called "Ascension" from the cultivator.

=== Volume 2: First Steps on the Journey of Immortality ===
By chance, Han Li joined the Yellow Maple Valley with the "Ascension" token, one of the seven major sects of immortal cultivation in Yue State, with the help of the Immortal Ascension Order, and officially embarked on the road of immortal cultivation. After joining the Yellow Maple Valley, Han Li's cultivation level improved rapidly with his alertness and with the help of the mysterious bottle.

=== Volume 3: Invasion of the Devil Dao ===
In order to obtain the foundation-building pill, Han Li risked his life to enter the blood-colored forbidden land and met Nangong Wan. After accidentally touching the Ink Dragon's sac, Han Li and Nangong Wan had sex. A few years later, the demon sect expanded and invaded Yue State. To avoid the war, Han Li reached the Chaos Star Sea through a mysterious ancient teleportation array.

=== Volume 4: Across the Sea ===
After several efforts, Han Li formed a golden elixir, and during this period, he occasionally got a gold-eating bug. He met Zi Ling and got a golden thunder bamboo. At this time, rumors spread that the "Twin Saints of Tianxing", the controllers of the Chaos Star Sea, had gone astray in their cultivation, and chaos gradually arose in the Chaos Star Sea. Not long after, the "Xutian Palace" was opened once every three hundred years. Han Li was fortunate to enter the treasure hunt. By chance, he obtained the first secret treasure of the Chaos Star Sea, the Xutian Ding, which was coveted by all forces in the Chaos Star Sea. So he was teleported to the outer sea, killed monsters to get the elixir, took the elixir to refine medicine, and took medicine to refine Qi. After dozens of years, he searched for medicinal materials and unfortunately encountered a demon cultivator. He was forced to help refine a magic weapon. Later, under Han Li's careful design, he secretly plotted against the demon cultivators, killed the poisonous dragon and obtained the heaven-defying magic weapon Fenglei Wings. Then, in order to avoid the pursuit of the demon cultivators, he took the teleportation array and sneaked back to the inner sea. He happened to meet his old friend Yuan Yao who was performing a heaven-defying magic. In the process of protecting her, he encountered the descendant of the Six Paths. When he was about to defeat him, he encountered the spiritual energy that only appears once in a hundred years. He was teleported to the land of ghosts by ghost fog. After many twists and turns and escaping from death, he was teleported to the Boundless Sea and finally returned to Tiannan.

=== Volume 5: Reputation Shaking the Land ===
At this time, the war in Tiannan had stopped, and Han Li sneaked into Luoyun Sect to practice. After more than 20 years, he successfully formed a fetus. After many twists and turns, he finally snatched Nangong Wan from Yanyue Sect. A few years later, he got the news of the first dangerous place in Tiannan, Zhuimo Valley, and the magicians also invaded fiercely. In the decisive battle with the magicians, Han Li reversed the situation with his initial Nascent Soul cultivation, and thus killed the wife of the leader of the Yinluo Sect of Dajin. Later, the Mulan Grassland was attacked by the Tuwu people and was forced to cease fire. Han Li returned to Luoyun Sect and learned that the law enforcement elder of Yinluo Sect had secretly plotted against Nangong Wan, causing Nangong to seal herself for a hundred years, and issued a declaration of war to Han Li. Han Li fought and killed him, and obtained the Yinluo Sect's treasure Yinluo Pan.

=== Volume 6: Divine Spirit Treasures ===
To save Nangong Wan, Han Li went to the Demon Valley to look for the inner elixir of the Fire-Melting Beast. As a result, the Ghost Spirit Sect and Nanlong Hou accidentally let the ancient demon go. Han Li accidentally fell into a space crack while fighting the ancient demon and fell into the Lingmiao Garden where ancient cultivators planted spiritual herbs. In order to break through the space, Han Li secluded himself for 20 years and reached the middle stage of the Nascent Soul. After coming out, he relied on the Golden Thunder Bamboo to help the three cultivators suppress the boundless demonic energy, and then embarked on the road of Dajin.

Passing through the Mulan Grassland, he was severely injured by several magicians. Due to the heavy evil spirit, he used the Five Ghosts Soul Lock to seal his cultivation. After several twists and turns, he was chased by the Saint and fled to Dajin. By chance, he entered a Buddhist family in Dajin, obtained the Vajra Relics, and practiced the Buddhist mind method. Under the guidance of Dayan God, he controlled the evil spirit and restored his cultivation. Under the pursuit of Tianlan Saint and others, he collected materials, completed Dayan God's last work, the Yuanying Late Puppet, and made the Three Flame Fan, a replica of the Tongtian Lingbao Seven Flame Fan. Finally, he accidentally entered the famous mountain Kunwu Mountain in Dajin, fought against the elder of Yinluo Sect, accepted the Five Sons of the Heart Demon, and got the method to rescue Nangong Wan. In Kunwu Mountain, he eliminated the ancient demon, learned the identity of Yin Yue, and finally escaped from Kunwu. In order to collect medicine to help Nangong Wan recover, he went to the Xiaoji Palace in the north, which was related to the Xutian Palace. A replica of the Xutian Ding and the Qianlan Ice Flame were discovered. The Great Elder of Xiaoji Palace failed in his attempt to seize the Xutian Ding and was killed. Later, under the attack of the demon tribe, Xiaoji Palace was completely destroyed. Finally, Han Li and a level 10 Ice Phoenix were teleported to Xutian Palace through the teleportation array. After more than 80 years, Han Li cultivated to the late Nascent Soul stage.

=== Volume 7: Dominating the Mortal Realm ===
After successfully escaping from the Xutian Palace, Han Li set foot in the Chaos Star Sea again and made a deal with the two saints of the Xinggong, exchanging some skills for three moves. He also accidentally encountered the battle between Luohou and Youtian Kunpeng and got a feather. After returning to Tiannan, he subdued the second Yuanying and defeated the other two late Yuanying cultivators with his magical powers, making Luoyun Sect a super sect. After rescuing Nangong Wan, they became Taoist partners and helped the Tianlan Holy Beast survive the thunder tribulation. After dealing with miscellaneous matters, he retreated for 120 years again, refined the feather of Kunpeng, and refined some new magic weapons. Later, the Xinggong sent an urgent telegram, so he went to the Chaos Star Sea again and fought against the six paths that took over Wan Tianming's body. Han Li showed his magical powers and killed the six paths with all his strength, making great contributions to the Xinggong. He helped Zi Ling regain her freedom and had a love affair with her. Later, he practiced the Yuanci Divine Light, advanced to the God Transformation Stage, and ascended to the Spirit Realm with Bingfeng through the clues of the space channel left by Yinyue.

=== Volume 8: First Foray into the Spirit Realm ===
After arriving in the spirit world, Han Li first served as a Qingming Guard in Tianyuan City. Later, the Xuantian Soul-Slaying Sword triggered a reaction in the Chaos Ten Thousand Spirits List, and a war between all races was imminent. Because of the invasion of foreign races, he participated in the execution of dangerous tasks to save his life. He met the Yaksha King of the Yaksha Clan in the Fusion Stage, and escaped by chance, leaving the human and demon races.

=== Volume 9: Races of the Spirit Realm ===
Due to being hunted, he mistakenly entered the territory of the Tianpeng tribe, where he helped the saint of the Tianpeng tribe to conduct the trial of the earth abyss, obtained the twelve changes of Jingzhe, and was captured by the demon king in the earth abyss. He used Han Li's Golden Thunder Bamboo to enter the Styx, and then met Yuan Yao again and escaped with him. He met Qing Yuanzi, and with his help, he left there and promised to help Qing Yuanzi find materials, while Yuan Yao and his sister stayed. When he returned to the human race, the treasure of Xuantian was sacrificed with blood, and he forced it to break through the space and entered the Thunder Continent. Then he accidentally obtained the Guanghan Order and got the opportunity to enter the Guanghan Realm. After making a deal with Qianqian, a woman from the Crystal Clan, he repaired the Tianwai Magic Armor, obtained the blood of the mountain giant ape, and entered the Guanghan Realm. His cultivation broke through to the peak of Lianxu, and his second Yuanying also broke through to the peak of Lianxu. He obtained a large number of herbs and mysterious star maps and many materials that had long been extinct in the spirit world in the immortal mansion, and then came out to return to the Thunder Continent, exchanged herbs with the local saints (combination period monks), and returned to the Fengyuan Continent.

=== Volume 10: Battle of the Devil Realm ===
He successfully broke through the fusion stage, accepted several disciples, participated in the Black Domain Trade Fair, exchanged for the Ice Phoenix, and was invited by the Gu family to participate in the True Spirit Conference. He advanced to the middle stage with the help of various elixirs, acquired several new magical powers, and then went to the Abyss of the Earth to find Qing Yuanzi to complete the transaction, and obtained the Styx Divine Milk. In the process, he met a tribulation stage master who even Qing Yuanzi feared, and exchanged for the secret book of cultivating the Gold-Eating Bug King.

At the beginning of the "demon calamity", he was helped by the Ice Phoenix and advanced to the late stage of fusion. He fought against the First Demon Lord and the incarnation of the Blood Light Saint Ancestor, and Tianyuan City won a great victory. Later, he entered the demon world with the ancestors of the Long family and ten other human and spirit races to find the Pure Spirit Lotus in the Spirit Pool. During this period, he met Zhu Guoer who knew the Su Nu Gong and learned that Nangong Wan might be stranded in Xiaolingtian; he crossed the Huanxiao Desert and obtained the blood of the Blue Luan to increase the "Qingzhe Jue"; he crossed the forbidden sea of thunder and saw a true spirit-level crab.

Encountering Yuanyan on Kuling Island, the team was wiped out except Han Li, and the Spirit King's soul seriously injured Yuanyan. The Baohua that had been following him appeared. Han Li used the Soul-Slaying Sword and the Nirvana Body to fight a three-way confrontation, and exchanged two immortal elixirs from Guanghan Realm for the opportunity to enter the Soul Washing Pool. After leaving Kuling Island, he was intercepted by the incarnation of Nirvana Saint Ancestor, but resolved the crisis with his strength and the towering fortune dew. Reached an agreement with the big crab and got the big crab to follow him.

He went to Lanpu Lake, plotted to obtain the Blood Fang Rice and the Great Five Elements True Light. He met Zi Ling in Guangyuanzhai, expressed his love to each other and promised to help her. On the way back to the spirit world, he met Baohua again and helped her escape the pursuit of the Six Extremes Avatar and the Blue Waterfall Saint Ancestor, and got the news of Xiao Lingtian. He returned to the spirit world to fight Yuansha again, met Yin Yue and Ao Xiao by chance, participated in the battle of the Wood Clan and made outstanding contributions, retreated to help Yin Yue and impact the Mahayana realm.

=== Volume 11: The True Immortal Descends ===
Han Li advances to the Mahayana realm, encounters the injured Purple Eyed True Dragon Fan Paozi, and receives an invitation to the Guangling Dao Fruit Conference. He returns to Tianyuan City to hold the Mahayana Ceremony, and during the ceremony, he injures the Mahayana Black Owl King of the Yaksha Clan. He is invited to the Holy Island to enter the Demon Realm to save Ao Xiao and Mo Jianli, and during this time he goes to the Xu family and promises to save the Ice Soul Fairy.

He went to the place where the Demon Realm was first printed, and fought against the mother of the borer with Baohua and other Mahayana from all realms. He got the help of the impoverished True Immortal He Kang and killed it. He left after learning about the changes in the Immortal Realm and that the Refining Spirit Technique was a forbidden technique. He returned to the Spirit Realm and entered the Small Asura Realm to help Ao Xiao overcome the heavenly tribulation in exchange for the Spirit King Immortal Talisman and achieve his goal. During this period, the Kongyu Clan recognized him as their master, and he obtained the treasure of the Kongyu Clan's cave heaven, and accepted Lan Yao, a member of the Kongyu Clan, as his apprentice.

After returning to the spirit world, he failed to arrive in time and learned that Ao Xiao had unexpectedly fallen under the heavenly calamity. He built Qingyuan Palace in the Boundless Sea, settled Yinyue, and went on a trip. He helped Qingyuanzi to resist the enemy in the Styx, and went to the Blood Sky Continent to help Bingpo escape. During this period, the True Immortal Ma Liang descended to the world and sacrificed countless lives. The Mahayana sieges against Ma Liang failed one after another. Han Li participated in the battle of the strong men of the Helian Merchant Alliance, and defeated the King of Xiongsi to obtain the secret technique of Yuangang Cover.

When he was looking for the entrance to Xiaolingtian, he met the Mahayana human-faced Jiao Tu Yao again and helped him. He entered Xiaolingtian and found Nangong Wan. After leaving Xiaolingtian, he learned about the changes in the bloody sky caused by Ma Liang. After that, he returned to Fengyuan Continent and agreed to the proposal of Mingzun of Helian Shangmeng to join forces. After that, he returned to the human race and practiced the Yuan Gangzhao secret technique and comprehended several great magical powers. Later, he joined forces with many Mahayana masters to fight against Ma Liang. After killing Ma Liang, he subdued the demon head and Huoxuzi and obtained several true soul pills. After many powerful people in the spirit world learned about it, they came to trouble Han Li one after another. Han Li sent them away one by one, and achieved the reputation of the first Mahayana in the spirit world.

After that, he met the Spirit King again and searched the soul of another True Immortal sealed by the Spirit King. He learned that the spirit of the Heaven-Holding Bottle was in the Demon Realm, so he went to the Demon Realm to merge with the spirit of the bottle and obtained the complete Heaven-Holding Bottle, which greatly increased his strength. Later, he participated in the Guangling Dao Fruit Conference, obtained the Guangling Dao Fruit, and achieved the Guangling Dao Body. He returned to the human race and began to retreat. Hundreds of years later, he found that there was a problem with his sea of consciousness, so he returned to the Demon Realm and made a deal with the True Immortal He Kang. He returned to the human world to retrieve the North Pole Yuanjing and refined the last Jishan. Later, he began to retreat for more than 8,000 years and finally ascended to the True Immortal Realm. Several Mahayana monks were born in the human and demon races, becoming a large clan in the Spirit Realm. Han Li finally achieved the Great Dao!

== Character Introduction ==
Han Li: Protagonist of the novel, nicknamed Erlangzi, from Wuligou, Qingniu Town, Jingzhou, Yue State, Tiannan, a member of the Yan tribe. He has an ordinary appearance and dark skin. He is the fourth child in the family. He was introduced to Qixuanmen by his uncle in his childhood. Because he has spiritual roots (four pseudo-spiritual roots lack gold), he can practice Changchun Gong and be accepted as a disciple by Doctor Mo. From then on, he embarked on the road of cultivation. He is determined, will not get up early without profit, acts low-key, does not care about face, does not want to be a hero, is good at escaping, is meticulous, has a tough mind, is resolute and ruthless, acts according to the situation, and has a basis for advance and retreat. He practiced hard all the way and finally ascended to the immortal world.

Nangong Wan: Han Li's Taoist companion. A female cultivator of the Yanyue Sect, whose natal magic weapon is the Vermillion Bird Ring. She practices the Su Nu Samsara Technique. She and Han Li killed Mo Jiao together in the Blood Forbidden Land. Later, she had sex with Han Li after touching the Mo Jiao's sac. She became Han Li's Taoist companion in the middle stage of the Nascent Soul.After Han Li ascended to the Spirit Realm, she stayed in the Human Realm temporarily because of insufficient cultivation. Later, she advanced to the Divine Transformation Realm. Due to an accident, she ascended to the Small Spirit Heaven. After Han Li advanced to the Mahayana Realm, he went to the Small Spirit Heaven to find Nangong Wan. When Han Li ascended to the Immortal Realm, he stayed in the Human Race of the Spirit Realm.

Fairy Zi Ling: Han Li's confidante. Her real name is Wang Ning. She is the daughter of the former leader of the Miaoyin Sect in Chaos Star Sea. She is the most beautiful woman and confidante Han Li has ever met. Han Li helped her regain her freedom in the human world and gave her her first time to Han Li. She happened to meet Liu Ji's soul-dividing body ascending to the demon world.After Han Li killed the mother of the borer, he helped Zi Ling get rid of Liu Ji's control. He originally wanted to take her back to the spirit world, but when he learned that Han Li had a high chance of ascending to the fairy world, he chose to stay in the demon world, so that she would have the opportunity to achieve the body of a fairy and reunite with Han Li in the fairy world.

Yin Yue: Han Li's confidante. Also known as Xue Ling, she was originally one of the two souls of Linglong Fairy, the Silver Moon Demon Wolf in the Spirit World. Because she was possessed by the soul of the Demon World Ancestor Yuan Sha and escaped into the human world, she became a weapon spirit. Later, she was obtained by Han Li and turned into the weapon spirit of his life magic weapon. She treated Han Li as a master and servant, and developed a kind of affection for Han Li over time.She was the only person who knew the secret of Han Li's small bottle. Later, she escaped and returned to the Spirit World. She awakened the Seven-Star Moon Body because of a blessing in disguise. In order to advance to the fusion and practice the Forgetting Love Art, she developed a demon in Han Li's heart. With the help of Han Li, the ancestor Ao Xiao, she gradually got rid of the control of the Forgetting Love Art and followed Han Li all the time. Before Han Li ascended to the Immortal World, she advanced to the Mahayana stage.

Yuan Yao: Han Li's confidante. A female cultivator from a small sect near Kuixing Island, she is loyal to her senior sister Yanli and paid a huge price to help her ghost sister to be reborn.She was sucked into the spirit world through an unknown channel while practicing the Yin-Yang Reincarnation Technique with her senior sister, and was later accepted as a disciple by Jiang Laoguai/Qing Yuanzi. Han Li has been helped a lot by her, and she has a secret crush on Han Li.

Mu Peiling: Han Li's confidante and nominal concubine. A female cultivator of Luoyun Sect, she was in charge of the medicine garden. Han Li entered Luoyun Sect to practice and came under her jurisdiction. She was forced to marry by her family, but she kept refusing to get married.After Han Li formed his Nascent Soul, Mu Peiling lied to the public that she had been accepted as Han Li's concubine. In order to break through the bottleneck, Han Li took her in as his concubine and changed to practice Dianfeng Peiyuan Gong. Later, she failed to break through the Nascent Soul stage and died.

Chen Qiaoqian: Han Li's senior sister in Huangfeng Valley. After some twists and turns, she fell in love with Han Li and confessed her love to him, but was rejected by Han Li who was devoted to seeking the Great Dao.In order to wait for Han Li to marry, she died. Later, Han Li met someone who looked very similar to Qiaoqian in the spirit world and was very surprised.

Han Yunzhi: An old acquaintance of Han Li. A female cultivator of the Yuling Sect, she is kind and lovely. She once sold the Jinzhu Fubi Pen to Han Li at the Tainan Fair. Many years later, she and Liu Mei were ordered to track down the whereabouts of the Wood Spirit Infant.They were discovered by Han Li. When Han Li caught up with her, he found that she was an old acquaintance from many years ago and just knocked her out.

Wen Siyue: The daughter of Wen Qiang, an old acquaintance of Han Li. A female cultivator of Miaoyin Sect, she was out on a dangerous mission,and her father and daughter were rescued by Han Li. Han Li helped her escape from Miaoyin Sect. Wen Siyue wanted to marry him, but Han Li didn't understand her feelings, so he placed her on a deserted island and left.

Li Feiyu: Han Li's good friend. He met Han Li at the Qixuan Sect. His descendants, the Li family, passed down martial arts from generation to generation and became close friends with the Han family for many years. After Han Li embarked on the path of cultivation, he still often used the name of his old friend.

Mo Juren: Master Han Li. He was the founder of Jingjiao Society, one of the three tyrants in Lanzhou. He stayed in Qixuanmen for some reasons. He taught Han Li immortal arts in order to possess another body.However, he failed and his soul was devoured by Han Li. He left a suicide note, forcing Han Li to go to Mojia to detoxify and properly settle the Mojia. He left Han Li with the impression that immortal cultivation was dangerous, which greatly changed Han Li's character.

Dayan Shenjun: Han Li's teacher and friend. The founder of Dayan Jue, he has had sex with countless women, is a genius, and is proficient in puppet making.He helped Han Li a lot in his battles and growth. After entering reincarnation, Han Li felt lost.

Qing Yuanzi: Han Li's mentor and friend. The founder of Qing Yuan Sword Art, ascended to the spirit world. Later, his body was destroyed in a battle with the enemy.He tried to take over the body of a Chang Yuan clan cultivator but failed. The two merged their souls and called themselves Jiang. He hid in the Styx, cultivated to the Mahayana realm, met Han Li, and accepted Yuan Yao as his disciple.

Lei Yunzi: Han Li's friend. A foreigner, the young master of the Ming tribe, he is known as the "Five Thunder Body". He learned the lightning pattern condensation technique from Han Li using his unique lightning array. Later, he was hunted by Baohua because he was carrying a precious medicine. He met Han Li by chance, and the two of them escaped by controlling the lightning array together.

Bing Feng: Han Li's confidant. The Lord of the Ice Sea in the Human Realm, ascended to the Spirit Realm with Han Li. Due to the backlash of the restriction, she was captured by a combined cultivator.Later, she was rescued by Han Li and practiced with him. She became his confidant for 8,000 years and stayed in the Qingyuan Palace of the Human Race.

Treasure Flower Ancestor: Han Li's ally in the Demon Realm. One of the three great ancestors of the Demon Realm, he fled to the Spirit Realm due to a serious injury to his position as an ancestor.He forged a friendship with Han Li after he predicted that he would recover from his injuries. Later, he led the top Mahayana monks in all realms to kill the mother of the Great Disaster Borer of the Demon Realm and regained his position as an ancestor.

Mo Jianli: A Mahayana of the human race in the spirit world, and the protector of the human race. He took good care of Han Li in the spirit world,told Han Li about his experience of breaking through the Mahayana stage, and cultivated the hope of the human race. He eventually died in the great calamity.

== Works Settings ==
The realm of immortal cultivators is divided into eight realms: Qi Condensation, Foundation Establishment, Core Formation, Nascent Soul, Deity Transformation, Spatial Tempering, Body Integration, and Grand Ascension (only applicable to this book, the sequel "Immortal World" has higher realms). Except for Qi Condensation, each realm is divided into initial, intermediate, late and great perfection.

Qi Condensation	There are thirteen levels in total. The life span is the same as that of ordinary people, the soul is in gaseous form, and the five senses are well developed. The cultivators in the Qi training stage need to use spiritual roots to absorb spiritual energy, store the spiritual energy in the limbs and bones, and gather it in the Dantian Qi Sea. If the marrow washing and Yijing are successful, the mortal's physical constitution will be improved, and then enter the foundation-building stage.
Foundation Establishment	The life span is more than 200 years, and the soul is in liquid form. The innate true fire can be used to refine pills and tools. The main goal of the foundation-building cultivator is to compress the spiritualenergy in the Dantian Qi Sea so that the true essence is solidified enough and condensed into a golden elixir. When the golden elixir comes out, the elixir will be formed.
Core Formation	The liquid solidifies and forms a golden elixir. The life span is more than 500 years. The soul is in a solid state and can be refined into magic weapons and the life magic weapon.The life magic weapon can be used by the Taoist ancestors without any problem, and there is no need to borrow magic tools to fly in the air.
Nascent Soul	The life span is more than a thousand years, and the soul is in the shape of a baby. They practice various secret arts and magical powers, and often use their own magic weapons, ancient treasures, and imitations of spiritual treasures to practice incarnation. The Yuanying realm cultivators are considered to have just achieved the Great Dao.As long as the Yuanying is not destroyed, the Yuanying cultivators can take over the body by themselves, and can use the infant fire to refine the elixir and tools. The Yuanying cultivators' souls are hidden in the Yuanying, and are affected by the Yuanqi of heaven and earth and the laws of the interface. Yuanying cultivators need to avoid thunder disasters in order to live forever.
Deity Transformation	Attracting the spiritual energy of heaven and earth, combining with the five elements, achieving immortality of the body, and ascending to the spirit world. With a lifespan of more than 2,000 years, one can use the spiritual power of heaven and earth. Casting spells in the human world will cause the loss of essence and greatly reduce lifespan.In the early stage of transformation, one is not afraid of the huge pressure of the boundary force in the space node; in the late stage of transformation, one is not afraid of the Yang Gang wind, and the Nascent Soul can leave the body and move freely. In the state of great perfection, one can shatter the void and ascend to the spirit Realm.
Spatial Tempering	The Nascent Soul that was transformed into the Primordial Spirit was transformed into a phantom. Beyond the phantom, one could cultivate an external incarnation, which could call upon the Yuan Qi of heaven and earth, unite the five elements of the spiritual roots, and integrate the body with heaven and earth, becoming immortal.As long as there was sufficient supply of Yuan Qi of heaven and earth, one's lifespan would be infinite, but due to various heavenly tribulations, one would not be able to live forever without worries.
Body Integration	The shadow that he had cultivated had gradually revealed its true form. The vitality of the heaven and earth that his true form had mastered was several times or even dozens of times that of the one in the Refining Void stage, and he could initially borrow the power of the laws of heaven and earth.
Grand Ascension	A cultivator can advance to the Grand Ascension realm by avoiding the Nascent Soul Thunder Tribulation, strengthening the body, and surviving the Five Elements Tribulation, True Thunder Tribulation, and Heart Demon Tribulation. After reaching the Grand Ascension realm, the cultivator's Nascent Soul will solidify and improve, the body will be recast, and the power of the law can be borrowed.The state of the Grand Ascension period, when the cultivation level is perfect and the calamity of ascension can be triggered at any time, is the "CTribulation Transcendence". After surviving the tribulation, one can ascend to the True immortal Realm and live as long as the heaven and earth (Note: Tribulation Transcendence is not a realm, but a "state").

== Honors ==
- In July 2017, A Mortal's Journey to Immortality ranked third on the "2017 Maopian Hurun Original Literature IP Value List" (Chinese: 2017猫片 胡润原创文学IP价值榜; pinyin: Māo piàn hú rùn yuánchuàng wénxué IP jiàzhí bǎng).
- On December 20, 2018, it ranked second on the "2018 Maopian Hurun Original Literature IP Value List" (Chinese: 2018猫片·胡润原创文学IP价值榜; pinyin: Māo piàn·hú rùn yuánchuàng wénxué IP jiàzhí bǎng).
- On September 16, 2021, A Mortal's Journey to Immortality was included in the "China's Most Influential Online Literature List (2020) IP Adaptation Influence List".
- A Mortal's Journey to Immortality is a popular novel written by Qidian Platinum writer "Wang Yu", and is currently being updated serially.(already Completed as of 2016)

== Influence ==
The "Mortal Stream" pioneered by this work once dominated the Xianxia genre, attracting many followers. This work was widely loved by readers as soon as it was published. Before signing a contract with the website (no recommendation resources), the collection had exceeded 5310. In November 2010, it won the first place in the monthly ticket list of Qidian. In 2013, it broke through the four hundred alliances and became the first "four hundred alliance book" on Qidian Chinese website. In September 2014, it had accumulated 500,000 collections. As of August 2018, the total number of member clicks exceeded 100 million, ranking fifth in the total member click list (the sequel "Mortal Cultivation Biography: Immortal World" ranked second). It has dominated the top of the book friends' recommendation list for many years. In 2012, it was adapted into an online game. In 2020, an Donghua adaptation was aired on Bilibili.

== Derivative works ==
Promotional Poster for its Donghua Adaptation currently being aired on Bilbili

- A Mortal's Journey to Immortality animated 3D version, Wind Rises in the South (seasons 1 and 2); The Battle of Yanjiabao (Special Edition); The Battle of the Demonic Path (seasons 1 and 2); Farewell to the South (seasons 1 and 2); First Time in the Starry Sea (Season 1). An animated adaptation of the original work was produced by Wonder Cat Animation (Chinese: 万维猫动画; pinyin: Wàn wéi māo dònghuà) in 2020 (first aired on July 25, 2020, to date).
- A Mortal's Journey to Immortality, a comic book adapted from the original novel, jointly launched by Zhongtian Chuangshi and Guangzhou Wendao.
- A Mortal's Journey to Immortality Online, an MMORPG online game developed and operated by Baiyou Huitong in 2011.
- A Mortal's Journey to Immortality Web, an RPG web game developed by Shanghai Xuanting in 2012.
- A Mortal's Journey to Immortality - Standalone Version, a stand-alone PC game developed by Xuanhuang Studio in 2013 and distributed by Guangzhou Aiyou.
- Manhua adaptation for Mortal's Journey to Immortality Vol.1 Cover illustrations by HeHe and Cake Moon(蛋糕月)
  A Mortal's Journey to Immortality, a film of the same name produced by Mao Films and is expected to be released in 2019.

== Related works ==
A Mortal's Journey to Immortality: The Immortal Realm is a sequel to A Mortal's Journey to Immortality, Starts 10,000 years later after the first, telling the story of the protagonist Han Li's continued Journey after he successfully ascended to the immortal realm.
