= Renegade Immortal =

Chinese novel/donghua series by Er Gen

- 仙逆
- Genre: Action; Adventure; Fantasy; Xianxia
- Based on: Renegade Immortal by Er Gen (耳根)
- Directed by: Shi Touxiong (石头熊); Feng Yi (冯毅)
- Country of origin: China
- Original language: Mandarin Chinese
- No. of seasons: 4
- No. of episodes: 141

Production
- Animator: Build Dream Animation (铸梦动画)
- Production company: Tencent Penguin Pictures (企鹅影视)

Original release
- Network: Tencent Video
- Release: 25 September 2023 – present

Renegade Immortal (仙逆) is a Chinese 3D animated web series (donghua) produced by Build Dream Animation and Tencent Penguin Pictures. Based on the xianxia web novel of the same name by Er Gen, the series premiered on Tencent Video on September 25, 2023.

Upon its release, it received a 9.4 out of 10 rating from more than 2.7 million user reviews on Tencent Video, making it the highest-rated new domestic animation on the platform at that time. Due to this high viewership, Tencent upgraded the series from a limited seasonal run into a continuous, year-round weekly broadcast in 2024.

== Novel ==
Renegade Immortal was published on Qidian from 2009 to 2012. The novel ended with 13 volumes and 2,088 chapters. It was Er Gen's breakthrough work and made him popular on the platform. The story also connected with his later novels, including Pursuit of the Truth and I Shall Seal the Heavens. An official English translation was later released by Wuxiaworld.

== Premise ==
Wang Lin is a teenager from a small village who wants to join the Heng Yue Sect, a cultivation school. However, he fails the entry test because he has very poor spiritual talent. Later, his life changes after he finds the Heaven Defying Bead, a mysterious treasure that helps him train faster. Unlike many cultivation heroes, Wang Lin does not rely on natural talent or strength. Instead, he survives through careful planning, traps, and ruthless decisions in a dangerous cultivation world where death is common. The story mainly focuses on his struggle against fate and his goal to revive his family after they are killed in a massacre.

== Characters ==
- Wang Lin (王林): The main character of the series. He was born in a poor village family. At first, he only wanted to protect his parents and help his family with their debts. Unlike many xianxia heroes, Wang Lin has very poor talent for cultivation and even fails the test to join the Heng Yue Sect. His life changes after he finds the mysterious Heaven Defying Bead (天逆珠). After the cultivator Teng Huayuan kills his entire family, Wang Lin becomes cold, careful, and ruthless. He survives by using planning, traps, patience, and intelligence instead of natural talent. Unlike many cultivators who only seek power, Wang Lin’s true goal is to revive his parents and his wife, Li Muwan, by going against the Heavenly Dao.
- Li Muwan (李慕婉): The main female lead and Wang Lin’s only wife. She is a talented alchemist from the Luo He Sect and first meets Wang Lin during a sect competition. Their relationship grows deeper in the Sea of Devils, where Wang Lin protects her from enemies while she helps refine pills for his cultivation. Over time, she falls deeply in love with him and waits 200 years for his return. Unlike Wang Lin, Li Muwan has limited cultivation talent. Her repeated failures to reach the Nascent Soul stage slowly reduce her lifespan, eventually leading to her death at the Cloud Sky Sect. Before her soul disappears, Wang Lin forcefully saves her Nascent Soul from the Heavenly Dao. Her death becomes the main emotional turning point of the story. After losing her, Wang Lin becomes obsessed with bringing her back to life, spending thousands of years trying to become strong enough to defy the laws of life and death.
- Situ Nan (司徒南): A powerful and arrogant cultivator whose soul is trapped inside the Heaven Defying Bead, the treasure Wang Lin discovers when he is young. Situ Nan becomes Wang Lin’s first mentor and teaches him cultivation techniques and the harsh survival rules of the immortal world. Over time, their relationship grows into a close brotherhood.

== Production ==
The series is animated by Build Dream Animation (铸梦动画), a Chinese CGI studio, and directed by Shi Tou Xiong and Feng Yi. The animation uses 3D computer-generated imagery to show large magical battles, spiritual treasures, and fantasy worlds that are common in the xianxia genre. After the first season received strong viewership on Tencent Video, the production committee decided to expand the project. In 2024, Renegade Immortal was moved into a "continuous annual broadcast" (年番, nianfan) schedule. This means the studio now produces and releases new episodes weekly without long seasonal breaks. The franchise later expanded with feature-length special episodes, including the theatrical release Battle of the Gods (神临之战).

=== Theatrical specials ===
Besides the regular weekly episodes, Build Dream Animation also expanded the series with feature-length special episodes. The first special, Renegade Immortal: Battle of the Gods (神临之战), premiered on May 30, 2025. The release attracted strong attention before its broadcast, with more than 3.8 million advance reservations. For the special, the production team upgraded the animation quality by adding naked-eye 3D visual effects and improved hair and clothing rendering technology.

=== Video games ===
An officially licensed mobile role-playing game based on the series, called Renegade Immortal (also known as 仙逆H5 in mainland China), was released for iOS, Android, and Windows. The game was officially licensed by Tencent Animation and follows story arcs from the novel and donghua. Characters such as Wang Lin, Li Muwan, and Situ Nan appear in the game. Unlike the realistic 3D animation of the series, the game uses a cute “Q-version” (chibi) art style. The gameplay focuses on idle cultivation, realm breakthroughs, and a gacha system for collecting characters.

== Reception ==
Renegade Immortal became a major commercial success in the Chinese animation market. During its first run, the series received a 9.4 out of 10 rating from more than 2.7 million user reviews on Tencent Video, making it the highest-rated new domestic animation on the platform at that time. By May 2025, analytics firm Yunhe Data (云合数据) reported that Renegade Immortal held an 11% share of China's animation playback market. The series' viewership continued to grow throughout its broadcast, with single episodes routinely exceeding 100 million views, eventually reaching a peak Yunhe market share of 15.4% of the total domestic animation market. It also surpassed long-running 3D series such as Battle Through the Heavens in overall viewership.

Media analysts also discussed the series for attracting a wider audience than expected. Although the original novel is considered a male-oriented fantasy story (男频, nanpin), The Paper reported that the donghua gained many female viewers as well. Critics said this was because the adaptation focused strongly on emotional themes, especially grief, family protection, and personal loss, which are themes more common in female-oriented fiction (女频, nvpin).

== Awards and recognition ==
At the 2024 Tencent Video Golden Goose Honors, Renegade Immortal won the "Annual Member's Beloved Animation" and "Animation with Best Reputation" awards. At the 2025 Golden Goose Honors, the series was awarded "Animation of the Year" and secured the "Animation with Best Reputation" award for the second consecutive year. Its theatrical special, Battle of the Gods, also won the "Outstanding Animation Screenwriter" award.
