= Coming-of-age story =

Genre of stories of growing into adulthood

In genre studies, a coming-of-age story is a genre of literature, theatre, film, and video game that focuses on the growth of a protagonist from childhood to adulthood, or "coming of age". Coming-of-age stories tend to emphasize dialogue or internal monologue over action and are often set in the past. The subjects of coming-of-age stories are typically teenagers. The Bildungsroman is a specific subgenre of coming-of-age story.

The plot points of coming-of-age stories are usually emotional changes within the character(s) in question.

== Literature ==
=== Bildungsroman ===
In literary criticism, coming-of-age novels and Bildungsroman are sometimes interchangeable, but the former is usually a wider genre. The Bildungsroman (from the German words Bildung, "education", alternatively "forming" and Roman, "novel") is further characterized by a number of formal, topical, and thematic features. It focuses on the psychological and moral growth of the protagonist from childhood to adulthood (coming of age), in which character change is important.

The genre evolved from folk tales of young children exploring the world to find their fortune. Although the Bildungsroman arose in Germany, it has had extensive influence first in Europe and later throughout the world. Thomas Carlyle had translated Goethe's Wilhelm Meister novels into English, and after their publication in 1824/1825, many British authors wrote novels inspired by it.

Many variations of the Bildungsroman exist, such as the Künstlerroman ("artist novel"), which focuses on the self-growth of an artist.

=== Japanese literature ===
In light novels and manga from Japan, coming-of-age is a primary genre of Japanese literature used for protagonists' growth from childhood and adulthood. Masashi Kishimoto's manga Naruto is a notable example of the genre, depicting the teenage protagonist Naruto Uzumaki with self-confidence, growth and ambition to becoming the Hokage.

Light novels and manga such as Beastars, Major, Mushoku Tensei, My Hero Academia and Vinland Saga also depicting coming-of-age elements but with mature, complex storytelling as it progresses.

=== Other ===
The coming-of-age story is a major characteristic of Xuanhuan 玄幻.

== Films ==
=== Teen film ===
In film, teen film is a genre of coming-of-age films, focusing on the psychological and moral growth or transition of a protagonist from youth to adulthood. A variant in the 2020s is the "delayed-coming-of-age film, a kind of story that acknowledges the deferred nature of 21st-century adulthood", in which young adults may still be exploring short-term relationships, living situations, and jobs even into their late 20s and early 30s.

Personal growth and change is an important characteristic of the genre, which relies on dialogue and emotional responses, rather than action. The story is sometimes told in the form of a flashback. Historically, coming-of-age films usually centred on young boys, although coming-of-age films focusing on girls have become more common in the early 21st century, such as The Poker House (2008), Winter's Bone (2010), Girlhood (2014), Inside Out (2015), The Diary of a Teenage Girl (2015), The Edge of Seventeen (2016), Lady Bird (2017), Aftersun (2022), Are You There God? It's Me, Margaret. (2023), You Are So Not Invited to My Bat Mitzvah (2023), Inside Out 2 (2024).

== See also ==
- List of coming-of-age stories
