= Cuttlefish That Loves Diving =

Author of "Lord of Mysteries"

- 爱潜水的乌贼
- Yuan in 2023
- Born: Yuan Ye; Leshan, Sichuan, China
- Education: Sichuan University (BS)
- Occupation: Novelist

Chinese name
- Traditional Chinese: 愛潛水的烏賊
- Simplified Chinese: 爱潜水的乌贼
Transcriptions
Standard Mandarin
- Hanyu Pinyin: Ài Qián Shuǐ De Wū Zéi

Chinese name
- Simplified Chinese: 袁野
Transcriptions
Standard Mandarin
- Hanyu Pinyin: Yuán Yě

Yuan Ye (Chinese: 袁野; pinyin: Yuán Yě), known professionally by his pen name Cuttlefish That Loves Diving (爱潜水的乌贼), is a Chinese novelist from Leshan city, Sichuan province. He graduated from Sichuan University with a major in computer science in 2007. He is best known for the web novel Lord of Mysteries, which has been translated into English and adapted into a namesake Chinese animated series.

When he was young, he loved to read martial arts novels. After graduating from college, he became an editor at the University of Electronic Science and Technology Press in Chengdu. He started writing web novels in 2011. In August 2013, he resigned from his job and devoted himself to novel writing.

== Bibliography ==
=== Lord of Mysteries series ===
1. Lord of Mysteries (2018–2020)
2. Lord of Mysteries: Extra Stories (2023)
3. Circle of Inevitability (2023–2025)

=== Standalone works ===
- 灭运图录 (Record of Extinction Destiny; lit. The Atlas of Destruction) (2011–2013)
- 奥术神座 (Throne of Magical Arcana; lit. The Throne of the Arcane God) (2013–2014)
- 一世之尊 (The Sage Who Transcended Samsara; lit. The Supreme Being of the World) (2014–2016)
- 武道宗师 (Martial Arts Master; lit. The Grandmaster of Martial Arts) (2016–2017)
- 长夜余火 (Embers Ad Infinitum; lit. The Embers of the Long Night) (2020–2022)
- 剑烛大荒 (Radiant Blade of the Wilderness; lit. The Sword Illuminates the Great Wilderness) (2026-)
