= Lord of Mysteries (animated series) =

Chinese animated series

Lord of Mysteries (Chinese: 诡秘之主; pinyin: Guǐ Mì Zhī Zhǔ) is a Chinese animated series adapted from the novel Lord of Mysteries written by Yuan Ye/Cuttlefish That Loves Diving. The animated series was produced by B.CMAY PICTURES and streamed on WeTV and Crunchyroll. The series was directed by Xiong Ke with Yuan Ye serving as the series writer.

== Season plan ==
B.CMAY PICTURES has unveiled a ten-year roadmap for the Lord of the Mysteries donghua adaptation, outlining plans for six seasons, three special episodes, and a movie, to be aired within a decade through 2035. The following table is the official release calendar directly from the event held by B.CMAY PICTURES:

Year	Name	Adapts novel volume
2025	Season 1 – Clown	Volume 1
2026	Special Episode 1	Volume 1
2027	Season 2 – Faceless	Volume 2
2029	Special Episode 2	?
2030	Season 3 – Traveler	Volume 3
2032	Season 4 – Undying	Volume 4
2033	Season 5 – Red Priest	Volume 5
2034	Seasons 6–7 (Note: Both planned for the same year, although it is not yet confirmed if they will be separate seasons or one combined season.)	Volumes 6–7
2035	LOTM Movie – The Fool Arc	Volume 8
2035	Special Episode 3	TBD

== Season 1 (2025) ==
Season 1, titled "Clown", covers the first volume (Chapter 1 – Chapter 213) of the novel, premiered as a double-episode special on June 28, 2025, and ended on September 13, 2025, with a total of 13 episodes. The first ending theme is "Dark Dream" by Curley Gao, which played for the first 12 episodes. The second ending theme is "THE ERASED" by Pu Yixing, which played during the final episode. Muse Communication also acquired the broadcast rights of the series, with each episode uploading daily on YouTube from October 1 until the finale on October 13. An English dub of the series was also released on Crunchyroll on July 25, 2025.

=== Voice casting ===
Character	Voice casting	
Character	Chinese	English
Klein Moretti	Yang Kaiqi	Joshua Waters
Audrey Hall	Zhao Shuang	Alexis Tipton
Alger Wilson	Guo Haoran	Daniel Van Thomas
Dunn Smith	Wu Lei	Brian Mathis
Leonard Mitchell	Titus Jin	Ian Sinclair
Daly Simone	Zhao Yitong	Macy Anne Johnson
Wendy Smyrin	Ma Cheng	Laurie Steele
Melissa Moretti	Qian Chen	Megan Shipman
Benson Moretti	Lan Taoyi	TBA
Old Neil	Li Haojia	Kent Williams
Azik Eggers	Liu Cong	Chris Guerrero
Trissy	Zhang Huilin (original); Lu Siheng (disguise as Tris)	Abigail Blythe (original); Conner Allison (disguise as Tris)
Crestet Cesimir	Chang Wentao	Chris Gardner
Megose	Jiang Yue	Molly Searcy
Lanevus	Tong Yin	TBA
Derrick Berg	Su Shangqing	Drew Breedlove
Ince Zangwill	Zhao Mingzhou	TBA
Roselle Gustav	Tutuhameng	Bradley Gareth
Katarina Pelle	Li Shimeng	Colleen Clinkenbeard
Susie	Cai Haiting	Trisha Mellon
Sharon Khoy	Qiu Qiu	Monica Rial
Hermes	TBA	R Bruce Elliot

=== Plots ===
No.	Title (Note: All English episode titles are taken from Crunchyroll.) (Note: Chinese episode titles are taken from Tencent Video.)	Directed by	Original release date
1	"The Fool" "愚者; Yúzhě"	Ke Xiong	June 28, 2025
Zhou Mingrei finds himself transmigrated into Tingen, awakening in the body of Klein Moretti, who survived a bullet headshot. While buying bread for his sister Melissa, he came across a tent run by a diviner while evading someone who was following him. When asked for a reading, the diviner draws The Fool, but was interrupted by an actual diviner. When attempting a Luck Enhancement Ritual for the second time, he, along with Audrey Hall and Alger Wilson, who referred to as "Justice" and "The Hanged Man" respectively, were summoned by grey fogs in another dimension with Klein being the leader, nicknamed "The Fool", forming the Tarot Club. Back at reality, two inspectors from the Tingen Nighthawks, Leonard Mitchell and Dunn Smith, paid a visit to his house to investigate the deaths of his two college students Welch and Naya, how he got the revolver, and the disappearance of the Antigonus Family's Notebook. Klein claims to have amnesia, and made an attempt to escape, but Dunn's ability, a Sequence Seven Nightmare, thwarted it. Another Nighthawks member, Daly Simone, confirmed that Klein had no recollection of the incident. Concerning about Klein's safety, Dunn offers him a position to join the Nighthawks.
2	"Beyonder" "非凡; Fēifán"	Ke Xiong	June 28, 2025
Klein visits the Wright and Hound Pub where he was taken to Blackthorn Security, the Nighthawks headquarters, where he formally accepts his position as a Beyonder, starting with Sequence Nine. While deciding his pathway, he visited a room run by Old Neil, an alchemist and his mentor; upon discovering his understanding of ancient languages and deciphered a book of Emperor Roselle Gustav's transcripts, Klein decided to take the seer pathway granting himself both the abilities of Spirit Vision and Dowsing Rod. Due to the potion effects, Neil warned Klein about overusage and the potion must internalize fully to function. After a few days of clerical work, Klein was assigned by Leonard on his first field mission: to visit a mansion at Foreston Street to rescue Elliot, who was taken hostage. Leonard's abilities managed to subdue the two captors, who both merged into a single monster being known as a Rampager. Klein recalls that he have visited that mansion before, aware that the house may contain clues relating to his history and the notebook. After his first mission, Klein's brother, Benson, just moved in to his mansion to reunite with him and Melissa.
3	"The Notebook" "笔记; Bǐjì"	Ke Xiong	July 5, 2025
The notebook was not found at the mansion, but information relating to Ray Bieber. However, Klein was unable to perform divination due to interference. Dunn later gave him a topaz pendulum to boost his abilities. The Holy Cathedral also verified Ray Bieber's lineage of the Antigonus Family due to the use of Sealed Artifact 2-049, a marionette where it can control people was under its area of effect with outside intervention nullifying its effect, prompting them to his location at a warehouse, where Bieber consumed the notebook and assumed his monstrous form. While the team managed to defeat Bieber and exposing the notebook, a clown sabotaged them by pushing them to the affect radius of 2-049, but both Leonard and Klein broke free of their control. The clown unsuccessfully offered the notebook in exchange for his next pathway, Sequence Eight Clown, but Klein successfully tricks the clown to trap him in the radius instead and deal with the final attack. The notebook was recovered and was sealed in Chanis Gate. The next day, Klein visits Khoy University to see his former lecturer Azik Eggers to learn more about Antigonus, Hornacis, and the Nation of the Evernight.
4	"Magic Mirror" "魔镜; Mó Jìng"	Ke Xiong	July 12, 2025
After Klein learns ritual magic from Neil, he then visits a divination club where Klein became a member due to his abilities, much to the praise of the shop owners Angelica and Glacis. Angelica then introduces to Hanass Vincent about his magic mirror and offered a reading that ends with two key words: "gathering" and "family". When Klein convenes the Tarot Club, he promotes Audrey and Alger as Sequence Nine Spectators and further exploring his abilities above the gray fog, before ending with a request for both to gather clues about Emperor Roselle. Melissa introduces to her friend Selena Wood for dinner, then try out a magic mirror given from Hanass; the mirror manifested its powers to possess Selena, but both Klein and Audrey's ritual magic countered it together and saving her, Melissa and Elizabeth in the process. Hanass was later killed by the Aurora Order for failing to pursuit Klein, prompting Klein and Dunn to investigate about him and gathering information relating to "True Creator", an entity which was worshiped by them.
5	"Hero" "英雄; Yīngxióng"	Ke Xiong	July 19, 2025
Klein was praised by the diviners for rescuing the passengers from Alfalfa, a ship which set sail a month ago, but did not reach the port after the ship faced a mutiny. Anna Wayne, the first customer of his Divination Club, introduced her fiancee, Joyce Meyer, one of the passengers, who then analyze his mind on why Alfalfa was attacked, bringing visions of Hornacis and Flegrea again. Neil took Klein to visit an underground black market, while shopping, Klein took chase of Tris, under a disguise of Trissy Cheek, who was connected to the Alfalfa tragedy and the city's recent murders; she was also a Sequence Seven Assassin, implying that Trissy was related to Demoness Sect, a female-dominant organization that befall disasters. The city reported a surge of deaths two weeks later, prompting the Nighthawks to investigate the matter. Through clues from the victims, the search narrowed town to the mansion in the South where they took down Trissy, but she escaped after the team gained an upper hand. Klein investigate the mansion, confirming Tris' disguise from a mirror, and the curse ritual from the altar being the reason behind the deaths.
6	"Teacher" "老师; Lǎoshī"	Ke Xiong	July 26, 2025
Elizabeth, having returned from Lamud Town, started having nightmares and offered Klein a reading, which he saw a collapsing castle and a wraith of a knight. The nighthawks visited Lamud Castle with 3-0782, the Mutated Sun Sacred Emblem, as a precaution due to the wraith's abilities. Learning about the wraith's attachment, the team surveyed the place, where they found a portrait that resembles Azik. Klein dived deep to learning more about the history and went into the gray fog to learn more about 3-0782, which a bright flash gave Klein a warning not to look directly at gods, and other higher sequences. After returning to Tingen, Klein visited Khoy University, where he confirmed Elizabeth's vision through seeing a blood drawing of Lamud Castle, Azik's books and information from him, who was immortal. Both revisited the Lamud Castle again, revealing that Azik was once a knight in Lamud, until the evil spirits began haunting the castle and abandoning his family and his son Teno in the process. Teno's coffin was opened, revealing the skull was stolen by someone that have ties to Klein. Leaving the site, Azik told he have recalled part of the memories, and told it is best to be forgotten.
7	"Coincidence" "巧合; Qiǎohé"	Ke Xiong	August 2, 2025
After Azik departs Tingen, back at headquarters, Dunn assigned them patrol duties with Klein guarding with Chanis Gate. While patrolling, the gate opens and Klein rushes to the gate where he sees 3-0625, a Misfortune Cloth Puppet, holding a scroll of paper, before retreating and the gate closes. Leonard and Royale Reideen rushes to the scene to see Klein was safe, but noticed about the abnormality due to the Notebook's influence. At the Divination Club, Klein met Christina to learn about Lanevus, a fraud suspect related to Hornacis Mountains, and his deranged fiancée Megose, before chatting with Angelica for further clues about Hornacis Peaks. Klein visits Deweyville Library to look for the borrower until he saw Sirius Arapis, who then flees as a Rampager, but was quickly subdued. Dunn and Leonard arrive, revealing the Aurora Order uses alphabets as codenames. These and the information exchanged in the Tarot Club about the Roselle's journal, Antigonus's family history, Zaratul's existence, the Secret Order, Clown Potion Formula, and its "bizarre" pathway, deduced that a manipulator was behind the scenes. He later dream about the events, aware that his memories had been altered due to 3-0625 and seeing contorted lines in his divination.
8	"Losing Control" "失控; Shī Kòng"	Ke Xiong	August 9, 2025
Klein convened the Tarot Club to look for clues relating to the red chimneys he witnessed during his previous divination and little information on the Roselle Diary from them, still trying to link information about organizations and the risks of a Beyonder. Klein learns a new paranormal activity at the dockside near Tussock River from a newspaper article, leading the team to perform a low-profile ritual in full view from the crowd to avoid detection. When the crowd dispersed, Klein noticed a stable Megose being saved from a carriage accident by Ferran Havre, a Nighthawks member and Neil's friend, who provide updates Neil about Lanveus. At the ship, while Klein was mastering Flaring Sun Charm, a merfolk-like Rampager attacks. During the fight, the Rampager hesitates upon looking at Neil, but after Klein dealt an attack for an opening to Neil, the Rampager was taken down. Neil confirms the Rampager was Ferran, identified through his bottlecan, much to the team's shock. Neil since retreated to his home in solitude, playing piano and mourned about the loss of Ferran, and his late wife Celeste. To prevent a similar incident from recurring in the future, Klein decides to take the advancement to Clown.
9	"Party" "聚会; Jùhuì"	Ke Xiong	August 16, 2025
Crestet Cesimir, a Sequence Five Warlock, visits the headquarters to interrogate Klein, which was part of his advancement test. Klein succeeded and was promoted to a Sequence Eight Clown, much to the amazement of the Nighthawks for his capabilities and accelerated progress, having joined the team under two months. Klein's powers and agility were enhanced after ingesting the potion, which include the ability to throw cards, though he kept on seeing strange visions about Hornacis. Neil decided to host a celebration party in two days, in which he was absent on that day. The Nighthawks visited Neil's house, but Neil told them to go back. They decide to search the house, now in a messy state, to see that Neil had become a Rampager. Neil revealed that he had secretly attempted resurrection rituals to revive his wife Celeste by using his body as a vessel, but it backfired and caused Neil to become a Rampager. Despite Neil pleads no harm to the Nighthawks, the grief-stricken team had to forcefully kill him to ensure the safety of the team and Tingen. Klein, while mourning, sees Neil's reunion with Celeste in the afterlife.
10	"Clue" "端倪; Duānní"	Ke Xiong	August 23, 2025
While visiting Neil's room, Klein found a picture of a wanted fugitive from one of the journals, Ince Zangwill, a former archibishop who fled with the sealed 0-08 three years ago; Dunn shared the information to exercise caution, due to 0-08 being one of the dangerous and confidential artifacts. Dunn also handed a silver-coated tarot deck, which only works against the undead, and advised to study more on spirituality. At nightfall, Daly, in her spirit medium and now a Sequence Six, visits Klein, informing him that she took over Neil as his mentor, while Klein tries to use a copper whistle, a gift from Azik, which summons a spectral skeleton. Klein and Dunn visits an asylum to interrogate a deranged Hood Eugen for answers about Aurora Order and Lanevus, but Klein had to escape its spirit vision as its consciousness was too strong. Later, they visited the residence of socialite Sharon Khoy about the death of a MP and mayoral candidate John Maynard. At the grey fog, Klein still could not deduce whether Sharon was the mastermind, but he inducted Derrick Berg, a man from the City of Silver, who he went by the name "The Sun".
11	"Mastermind" "黑手; Hēi Shǒu"	Ke Xiong	August 30, 2025
Under Sharon's influence, the Tingen legislature passes new laws to repeal a former constitution, drawing Klein's suspicion. Unable to use his dowsing rod due to Sharon cancelling it, Klein resorts to summoning technique, using his spectral form to stealthy discover Sharon's true intentions behind Tingen's manipulation, and a statue of the Primordial Demoness, revealing her Demoness Sect's affiliation. Dunn was prompted to retrieve 3-0217, a spirit medium mirror which summons a Doppelgänger, which he, along with Kenley White, brought along to the mansion to fight Sharon. Kenley, due to an error of judgement, accidentally reflects 3-0217 on himself and was fatally killed during battle, enraging Klein, but with Dunn able to distract Sharon, Klein seeks an opportunity by tossing 3-0217 and reflected it onto Sharon, causing her to drop the statue; Klein shoots the statue and wins the battle. Later, while Klein cleans downstairs as instructed by Dunn, he was frightened to see Dunn was eating Kenley's corpse, thinking that Dunn had become a Rampager.
12	"Bomb" "炸弹; Zhàdàn"	Ke Xiong	September 6, 2025
Dunn, upon Klein's discovery, revealed his ability as "Law of Beyonder Characteristics Indestructibility", by eating the corpse as disposal to enhance his ability, to avoid any misunderstanding. Klein then worried if the Demoness Sect and Aurora Order are connected, and whether if Lanevus' case would cause Tingen's doomsday. While Klein was still gathering clues, Leonard found the address of Lanevus' residence, 62 Howes Street, where it was discovered to be vacated. Klein and Leonard searched the house to find a secret letter, revealing that Lanevus had planned a doomsday event by planting a "bomb" somewhere in Tingen. They then rushed to the headquarters when suddenly, Megose entered the building thereafter. Discovering that Megose's womb was the "bomb" due to Lanevus conducting experiments to impregnate Megose with the "true creator", as well as Klein's visions, the Blackhawks buy them time to stall Megose, with Dunn retrieving 2-105, "Blood Vessel Thief", which steals one ability from a target within range, the Saint Selena's Ashes, and calling the Holy Cathedral as reinforcements. They did it on time, as Megose's womb manifests and turning her into a monster.
13	"Light" "光; Guāng"	Ke Xiong	September 13, 2025
The team, under Dunn's instruction, lured Megose to the memorial hall to prevent her from giving birth to the "true creator". However, as the team was overpowered as attacks to the womb were blocked by Megose, Dunn sacrifices himself in a last-ditch effort by ripping his heart from the chest, and with powers combining from the ashes, the spirits of the deceased Nighthawks, and Klein's Sun Emblem, Megose was defeated, saving Tingen from another disaster. However, Ince arrives at the hall and fatally stabbed Klein as well, in order to retrieve the ashes for his own promotion from a Sequence Five Gatekeeper to a Sequence Four Demigod. While Klein's physical body was killed, his soul survived spiritually with the grey fog's power, allowing him to be revived. Ince's stolen artifact 0-08 finishes narrating the story of Tingen's doomsday, commenting on its developments. Klein fully reviews the events leading up from the disappearance of the Antigonus' notebook to Dunn's death. Klein, knowing that his appearance could bring dangers to the Moretti family itself, he departs from Tingen to visit Backlund, now adopting under his new moniker, "Sherlock Moriarty".
