= Xianxia =

Chinese fantasy genre

- Traditional Chinese: 仙俠
- Simplified Chinese: 仙侠
- Literal meaning: immortal heroes
Transcriptions
Standard Mandarin
- Hanyu Pinyin: xiānxiá

Xianxia (traditional Chinese: 仙俠; simplified Chinese: 仙侠; pinyin: xiānxiá; lit. 'immortal heroes') is a genre of Chinese fantasy literature heavily inspired by Chinese mythology and influenced by philosophies of Taoism, Chan Buddhism, Confucianism, Chinese martial arts, classical Chinese medicine, Chinese folk religion, Chinese alchemy, and other classical elements of Chinese culture. It is also closely related to the wuxia and shenmo genre, as it developed as a subgenre of wuxia and simultaneously as a subgenre of shenmo before branching out to become a distinct martial arts genre by the late 19th century. It is often considered akin to other high fantasy genres such as the sword and sorcery stories of Western literatures and the ninja fantasy fictions in Japanese literature.

Protagonists of xianxia stories are often practitioners or trainees of magic and divination — i.e. truth cultivators (修真者) or simply cultivators (修士) — seeking spiritual enlightenment, immortality and supernatural miracle powers, or else are transcendent beings called xiān (仙), who have either already ascended or have mastered such aptitudes to varying degrees. Antagonists of xianxia stories typically have similar powers, and often belong to either malevolent rival clans/schools of cultivators, or mischievous/malicious tribes or gangs of ling (fairies and sprites), yao (monsters), mo (demons), gui (ghosts and undead beings such as zombies and vampires) and similar category of inhuman sentient beings. Persons in the xianxia genre manifest superhuman talents or physics-defying superpowers such as flight/levitation, teleportation, telekinesis, divination/soul flight, shapeshifting, materializing objects and force fields, manipulation of energy and the elements, etc.

Concepts from classical Chinese philosophies such as internal alchemy and external alchemy feature in this genre—deities, immortals, yaoguai, demons and ghosts all engage in meditative practices and the consumption of rare substances or creatures to improve their skills or to augment their power. Action tends to take place across multiple realms, the number of which depends on the author or the world in question, but this usually includes the immortal plane, the mortal realm, and in the underworld. The xianxia genre also tends to feature the existence of magical creatures who do not belong to either the yao or mo category, as well as supernatural artefacts capable of upending the status quo.

== Etymology ==
The characters forming xianxia are xiān (仙) and xiá (侠). A xian is a being from Chinese mythology, particularly from Taoist legends, that can be one or more of these things: a powerful spirit, a god, a zhenren, and/or someone who has obtained immortality or extraordinary longevity through self-cultivation to become a transcendent being.

A xia is sometimes translated as 'hero' or 'vigilante', but specifically implies a person who is brave, chivalrous, righteous and defiant. The character was originally used as one of the characters in the word wuxia and was transferred to the word xianxia to make it apparent that the modern xianxia genre was inspired by the popularity and several other elements, including powers gained from qi manipulation, of wuxia.

== Characteristics ==
The stories usually revolve around the adventure/growth of a magical practitioner or a mortal person who gets entangled in supernatural affairs, and include elements such as gods and immortals, spirits, demons, ghosts and mythical creatures. These stories are usually "Chinese fantasy rooted in...Taoism, Buddhism", other Chinese mythological elements and tropes, and shenmo fiction.

Xianxia novels often contain action themes against rival practitioners and supernatural beings, as well as plot twists involving power struggles, paranormal romance, retributive justice and/or upsets by underdog (diaosi) protagonists, making it one of the most popular wish-fulfillment genres among male readers. There are also Mary Sue novels featuring flawless female protagonists, which are gaining popularity with female readers.

Due to the genre's popularity, xianxia has also become a staple of Chinese television series, films, web series, manhua (comics), donghua (animated cartoons) and video games, similar to what wuxia has achieved during the latter half of the 20th century. Such examples of artistic adaptation include A Record of Mortal's Journey to Immortality (2008–2013) by Wangyu and The Attack of Heaven (2005) by Xiao Ding, both of which started as novels and were later adapted into donghua, manhua, television and films; and The Legend of Sword and Fairy series, which started as adventure computer games and have since expanded into a massive media franchise that includes television dramas, web series, films, stage plays, manhua, donghua, novelizations/fan fictions, audiobooks, trading card games and figurine collectibles.

=== Cultivation ===
The xianxia genre has a popular subgenre known as "cultivation" or "training" (Chinese: 修炼/修煉; pinyin: xiūliàn; 修真; xiūzhēn; 'training to reach the "True" state'; 修行; xiūxíng; 'training as an ascetic monk'; 修仙; xiūxiān; 'training to become a xian (immortal)'). The cultivation subgenre was first popularized in the 1990s by role-playing video games, which introduced the concept of "level" into the genre's character development after incorporating elements of the Taoist Neidan philosophy. In the 21st century, this subgenre became popular with the advent of web fictions, with online publishing sites such as Qidian.com, Zongheng.com, and 17k.com providing a convenient platform for authors to reach wide audiences with high-volume, serialized content. It was also popularized outside of Greater China, primarily by fan translations in the early 2000s. Novels such as Stellar Transformations, Coiling Dragon, Martial God Asura, and I Shall Seal the Heavens led to a boom in such fan translations.

In these stories protagonists are usually "cultivators" or "practitioners" (修心者; xiūxīnzhě; 修士; xiūshì; or 修仙者; xiūxiānzhě) who seek to become immortal beings called xian. Along the way, they attain eternal life, supernatural powers, and incredible levels of strength. The fictional theme of cultivation or immortal arts practice in xianxia is heavily based on the real-life meditation practice of qigong.

=== Powers ===
- Swordsmanship (劍法) — martial arts and hand-to-hand combat skills similar in form to those in wuxia, but often infused with magic for enhanced effects upon a target.
- Qi refining (煉氣) — manipulation and nourishment of qi inside the body via meditation and absorption of external energies, with the purpose of cultivating and enriching the internal core to enhance the practitioner's physical capabilities and accelerate one's spiritual elevation.
- Pill refining (煉丹) — cooking and smelting of rare magical herbs and minerals in a cauldron to make various potions, elixirs and immortality pills, which can be subsequently used to enhance one's combat effectiveness, heal injuries and detoxify poisons, accelerate qi cultivation, or help ward off foul spirit incursions.
- Fulu (符籙) — casting of notes, talismans, flags and other ritual equipment with inscribed asemic writings to project magical power upon a target.
- Magic array (陣法) — The arrangement of magical implements into a formation that can either enhance one's own abilities, teleport individuals and/or structures, establish a force field, portal or alternate dimension, or create magical traps that confuse, weaken, imprison or even kill an enemy.
- Fuji (扶乩) — theurgy that summons divine intervention onto one's body or instruments.
- Fairy driving (御灵) — the control, domestication and training of magical creatures and supernatural entities that can be summoned to perform tasks or used as champion enforcers in combat.

== History ==
There are many ancient Chinese texts that could be classified as xianxia in the modern sense, such as the Classic of Mountains and Seas from the Warring States period. Ming dynasty novels such as Quelling the Demons' Revolt, Journey to the East and The Legend of the Spell-Infused Dates were early precursors of xianxia novels, although traditionally they were regarded as a type of shenmo fiction. It wasn't until the Republic of China period of the early 20th century that modern xianxia literature became popularized, as the 1932 novel Legend of the Swordsmen of the Mountains of Shu by Huanzhulouzhu (Li Shoumin) is widely recognized as the first genuine xianxia novel that sparked widespread popularity.

After the founding of the communist People's Republic of China in 1949, xianxia genre, along with other fantasy genres, was seen as superstitious "poison grass" and banned outright in Mainland China, with Li Shoumin himself attacked politically, forced to stop writing and later suffered a stroke in 1958 as a result. After the Culture Revolution ended, the genre experienced resurgence when the "reform and opening up" during the latter part of 1970s, 1980s and 1990s, including the importation of wuxia television productions and video games from Hong Kong, Taiwan and Singapore, many of which were actually more xianxia than wuxia.

Into the 21st century, the increasing availability of commercial book publishers and the newly rise of online publishing platforms such as Qidian and Jinjiang Literature City allowed the genre to diversify exponentially, and many wuxia and xianxia novels written in the 2010s and 2020s have experimented with discussing topics such as neoliberalism and alternatives to what is seen as a stagnant world order brought about by magic and/or religious organizations. The advent of duanju (short video drama) on streaming platforms also catalyzed the popularization of the xianxia genre.

=== Films and television ===
Perhaps one of the earliest successful xianxia films was the 1983 Hong Kong film Zu Warriors from the Magic Mountain, which was followed up by the 2001 film The Legend of Zu.

Overall, television shows are more numerous than films when it comes to xianxia adaptations.

Some of the most popular and successful Chinese TV series in recent times are of the xianxia genre, such as Ashes of Love, The Journey of Flower, Eternal Love, The Untamed, Love Between Fairy and Devil, Till The End of the Moon and Love Game in Eastern Fantasy. It is worth noting many of these notable dramas are adapted from popular novels published on the website Jinjiang Literature City. In addition, there are also dramas adapted from popular video games such as Chinese Paladin, Chinese Paladin 3 and Swords of Legends. The already existing fandom of xianxia source material has led to increased exposure and anticipation.

== Relationship with other genres ==
Xianxia is often compared to the wuxia genre, and the two share many similarities – both being set in a quasi-historical ancient China, featuring larger-than-life human protagonists, and struggles between good and evil. The main difference is that xianxia generally has much more metaphysical themes. The genre has a heavier focus on spiritual growth and mastery of superpowers, pursuit for eternal existence, fates and reincarnations, multiple realms of reality, and interaction with legendary creatures and spirits. Wuxia, by contrast, is grounded in the human world with few supernatural elements and mainly emphasizes martial arts, personal vendetta, treasure hunting, social justice, radical politics, and power struggles.

Other variants of similar Chinese high fantasy exist as well, such as shenmo, which generally refers to high fantasy works that focuses more on deities, demons and other supernatural beings rather than humans; xuanhuan (玄幻; 'Eastern fantasy') generally refers to high-magic fantasy works that dispense with Taoist elements and have a less realistic setting; and qihuan (奇幻; 'strange fantasy' or 'exotic fantasy') are Chinese works set in a more explicitly Western-style fantasy setting, although generally keeping a Chinese mythological influence.

=== Influences ===
As xianxia novels have become more popular worldwide, other genres have been influenced by it, such as progression fantasy and litRPG. Authors such as Will Wight (Cradle) and Andrew Rowe (Arcane Ascension) draw on common themes found in xianxia.

== In popular culture ==
=== Literature ===
- Zhu Xian
- "Beware of Chicken"
- "Reverend Insanity"
- "Martial Peak"
- "Apotheosis: Ascension To Godhood"
- Heaven Official's Blessing
- A Record of Mortal's Journey to Immortality
- "Renegade Immortal"
- "Pursuit of the Truth"
- "I Shall Seal the Heavens"
- "A Will Eternal"
- "Infinite Bloodcore"

=== Manhua ===
- Rakshasa Street

=== Animated series ===
- Jade Dynasty

=== Film and television ===
- Ashes of Love
- The Blossoming Love
- A Chinese Ghost Story
- Chinese Paladin
- Demoness from Thousand Years
- An Eternal Combat
- Eternal Love
- Green Snake
- Immortal Samsara
- Jade Dynasty
- The Journey of Flower
- Legend of Fuyao
- Legend of the Demon Cat
- The Legend of Zu
- The Legends
- Love and Redemption
- Love Between Fairy and Devil
- Love of the Divine Tree
- Love of Thousand Years
- Love You Seven Times
- Noble Aspirations
- Once Upon a Time
- Painted Skin
- The Sorcerer and the White Snake
- The Starry Love
- Swords of Legends
- Till the End of the Moon
- The Untamed
- The Yinyang Master
- When Destiny brings the Demon
- Zu Warriors from the Magic Mountain

=== Video games ===
- Xuan Yuan Sword series
- The Legend of Sword and Fairy series
- GuJian series
- Black Myth: Wukong
- Sword Heroes Fate Series
- 凡人修仙傳M or Mortal Cultivation of Immortal M Android
- Legacy of Divinity M Android

== See also ==
- Wuxia, a low fantasy genre, has less supernatural power.
- Guzhuang – ancient Chinese-style costume, typically used in xianxia
