= Xuanhuan =

Chinese "Eastern Fantasy" genre

Xuanhuan (玄幻 typically translated as Eastern fantasy) is a Chinese fantasy genre that is rooted in but not limited to Chinese culture and mythology, often including foreign influence in current web novels and often set in a fantasy world, with the story including many Western fantasy elements.

== Genre ==
Xuanhuan (玄幻 typically translated as Eastern fantasy) is a Chinese fantasy genre that is rooted in but not limited to Chinese culture and mythology, often including foreign influence in current web novels and are often set in a fantasy world, with the story including many Western fantasy elements. It draws on the aesthetics of Chinese mythology and folklore and often alludes to literary classics.

The coming-of-age story is a major characteristic of the genre. Other characteristics include martial arts and romance.

A recurrent motif is the duality of the Heaven Realm/God Realm and the Demon Realm. Portrayals of the Heaven Realm emphasize a patriarchal and hierarchal society with formal rules. The Demon Realm is not depicted as the home of absolute villains and often has a congenial relationship with the Heaven Realm. Frequent narrative devices include the sealing away of a malevolent spirit that threatens the co-existence of all realms (as in, for example, the TV series Eternal Love). Stories such as The Journey of Flower and Ashes of Love depict the boundaries of the realms as unstable and blurred.

Xuanhuan stories often use the idea of a "true form", which relates to a non-human lineage or innate essence and can take the form of plants, animals, mythical creatures, objects, or phenomena. The "true form" includes both physical and spiritual aspects.

Self-cultivation, through joining a sect or studying with a master, is also a frequent concept in xuanhuan fiction. This focuses on the character's spiritual growth and transcending their former self. Drawing from the Buddhist idea of the kalpa, xuanhuan works often present a character undergoing a transformation of losing and gaining a world through ordeals like protecting oneself from thunderbolts or a deity's descent to the human world.

== Reception ==
Xuanhuan works are some of the most popular forms within China's entertainment industry. These stories are some of the most popular within Chinese online literature. For example, as of 2025, Qidian had more than 700,000 xuanhuan works available, more than twice as many as the genre with the second most works (urban fantasy).

Xuanhuan stories are often written for a young adult audience.

== Evaluations ==
Academic Shao Yanjun writes that xuanhuan challenges the dominance of realism in Chinese literature, which was established through the May Fourth writers. Shao contends that the genre's popularity reflects how realism has lost its power to guide mainstream culture and discourses.

== See also ==
- Xianxia
