= Qidian =

Chinese online literature website

Qidian (Chinese: 起点中文网) is a Chinese online literature platform owned by Tencent. Founded in 2002 by a xuanhuan (Chinese fantasy) community, the platform was acquired by Shanda in 2004 and then by Tencent in 2015.

== History ==
Chinese Magic Fantasy Union, founded in November 2001, is a community of Chinese fantasy enthusiasts. In May 2002, the Chinese Magic Fantasy Union founded Qidian, with the initial goal of promoting online literature and building a community of fantasy enthusiasts. In October 2003, Qidian began a pay-to-read system. This model separated literary works into free and VIP categories, with the VIP fees distributed between the portal and writers. Qidian became the largest literature portal on the Chinese internet, and other portals soon adopted a similar approach.

In October 2004, Qidian was acquired by Shanda. Shanda also acquired the literary portals Hongxiu and Jinjiang Literature City in 2008, forming Shanda Literature. In May 2005, the women's channel (nüpin) was launched as a section on the homepage of Qidian.com, and in 2009, the women's channel got its own domain name and was renamed Qidian Female Net.

In July 2008, Shanda established Cloudary Corporation, and Qidian became part of the Cloudary Corporation.

Among the major works which have been published on Qidian is Morning Star of Lingao, which began publication in 2009.

Since 2010, Qidian has allowed registered users to send reward money directly to authors through Qidian's system. By September 2010, Qidian had 10 million registered users.

At the end of 2014, Shanda announced the sale of the Cloudary Corporation. In 2015, Tencent acquired Shanda Literature, merging it with Tencent Literature to create China Literature (Yuewen). The founders of Qidian, who had gone on to work at Tencent, returned to Qidian following its acquisition by Tencent.

A 2019 study found that Chinese fantasy and wuxia-themed novels accounted for 42.39% of all online novels in Qidian.

In 2020, Qidian's owner Yuewen attempted to revise its contracts with writers, resulting in opposition from writers and readers. The new contract stated that Yuewen owned translated, derivative, and adapted works based on writers' original works. It provided that if a contracted-for work failed to meet Qidian's publishing requirements, the platform could take over and continue work with exclusive copyrights.

As of 2026, Qidian is the largest digital platform specializing in hosting popular fiction.

== Features ==
The main navigation bar at the top of the page provides access to the fiction area of the site categorized by genre: fantasy novels, wuxia novels, urban novels, historical novels, game novels, and more.

There are both long-term full-time writers and part-time amateur writers on Qidian. Most writers do not post all of their novels to Qidian at once, but will update their novels daily. Many writers will abandon their novels before the narrative is concluded, for reasons that include creative exhaustion, lack of energy, unpopularity of the story, and over-criticism.

=== Membership ===
It is not required to register with Qidian to read novels, however, registration is mandatory to enjoy some of the benefits Qidian offers, such as communicating with authors. As of 2016, Qidian offers four types of membership:

- Basic membership, which is free to sign up for, 5RMB for 100000 characters, one-off payment.
- Advanced membership, which costs 199RMB per year, 5RMB for 100000 characters, but allows one to accumulate credits and read with them.
- Junior VIP, 1200RMB per year, 4RMB per 100000 characters.
- Senior VIP, 3600RMB per year, 3RMB per 100000 characters.

== See also ==
- Jinjiang Literature City, a similar Chinese literature website
