= Scum Villain's Self-Saving System =

Serialized novel by MXTX, 2014–2015

The Scum Villain's Self-Saving System
- Author: Mo Xiang Tong Xiu (墨香铜臭)
- Original title: 人渣反派自救系统
- Translator: Faelicy and Lily
- Illustrator: Velinxi
- Language: Chinese
- Genre: Danmei; Chuanyue; Xianxia
- Publisher: Jinjiang Literature City
- Publication date: 2014–2015
- Publication place: China
- English publication date: December 14, 2021–November 1, 2022 (Seven Seas Entertainment)

The Scum Villain's Self-Saving System (Chinese: 人渣反派自救系统; pinyin: Rén Zhā Fǎnpài Zìjiù Xìtǒng) is a danmei novel by the pseudonymous Chinese author Mo Xiang Tong Xiu (墨香铜臭), often shortened to MXTX. It was first serialized on the online platform Jinjiang Literature City (JJWXC). It was Mo Xiang Tong Xiu's first novel, and it remains her shortest, at eighty-one chapters and nineteen extras. The novel contains more comedic elements than the author's subsequent works (Grandmaster of Demonic Cultivation and Heaven Official's Blessing), and it has a metafictional structure that parodies stallion novels, a genre of Chinese literature.

It began as a web novel serialized on JJWXC between November 21, 2014 to November 9, 2015 with over 400,000 words when it was finished. It has since been edited by the author, most recently in 2024. Physical copies of the book, split into three volumes, were released by a Taiwanese publisher, Pinsin Studio in Traditional Chinese in 2017.

An official English translation was published by Seven Seas Danmei between 2021 and 2022. The translation was published in four volumes, three following the main story and the fourth compiling the extras. This version is available internationally, and the novel has also been translated into other languages.

== Synopsis ==
Scum Villain's Self-Saving System is a parody of harem novels commonly found on the Chinese internet. It centers around a man named Shen Yuan who is transported into a fictional novel called Proud Immortal Demon Way (PIDW) and finds himself in the body of one of the villains, initially forced to act as that villain would.

The original PIDW novel follows its protagonist, Luo Binghe, as he surpasses the many challenges in his life, reaching the end point of ruling the world and possessing a harem of over three hundred women. Luo Binghe is a half-demon, half-human man who was originally found adrift as a baby in the Luo river and adopted by the washer woman who found him. She died when Luo Binghe was thirteen, and after her death, Luo Binghe journeyed to the Cang Qiong Mountain Sect and entered as a disciple under the peak lord, Shen Qingqiu—the "scum villain" who Shen Yuan takes the place of. As a youth, he was mercilessly punished and beaten by Shen Qingqiu (as well as his crony Ming Fan) and is eventually pushed by him into the Endless Abyss, a realm of demonic creatures where only the strong survive. In the Abyss, he realizes his demonic heritage and gains access to his sealed powers, vowing to repay his sufferings a thousand fold. He takes revenge on Shen Qingqiu by burning down the mountain sect, killing the disciples, and making Shen Qingqiu live as a "human stick", with arms and legs amputated, in his dungeon to torture at his leisure. Luo Binghe then goes on to conquer the world and reigns as the Demonic Emperor.

Shen Yuan is an avid anti-fan who has paid, read, and complained about every chapter of PIDW under the pseudonym Peerless Cucumber. He dies after cursing the novel. A greater power called the “System” puts his soul into the body of Shen Qingqiu. The System restricts Shen Yuan's actions to prevent major plot deviations by issuing punishments and deducting B-points. If his point total reaches zero, he dies. He gains points by improving the novel in a way the System approves of; for example, making the characters appear more complex, solving plot holes, acting intelligently, or making Luo Binghe seem cooler.

Shen Yuan's goal through the novel is to survive and avoid the same death that befalls his character in PIDW. By being kind to Luo Binghe, he accidentally leads Luo Binghe to develop a crush on him, changing the genre of the novel from a power fantasy to a gay romance. The trajectory of the plot shifts completely, as Luo Binghe's primary motivation becomes Shen Qingqiu's (Shen Yuan's) love and affection. Additionally, Shen Qingqiu successfully clears up several plot holes and loose threads; for example, he discovers the reason Yue Qingyuan never drew his sword in the original, and meets and confronts Luo Binghe's originally mysterious father.

== Characters ==
=== Protagonists ===
==== Shen Qingqiu (Shen Yuan) ====
Voice actor (Chinese): Wu Lei ; Voice actor (Japanese): Namikawa Daisuke

A devoted anti-fan of Proud Immortal Demon Way and the narrator of Scum Villain's Self Saving System. After dying in a fit of rage after reading the final chapter, he transmigrates into the body of Shen Qingqiu, the villainous teacher of the young protagonist, and is given the opportunity to improve the story. His main goal is to avoid the terrible future that awaits him by hugging the protagonist's thighs to get a less severe punishment when Binghe begins his plot of revenge.

Shen Qingqiu is known as the Peak Lord of Qing Jing Peak. The disciples of this peak are known for being skilled scholars, artists, and musicians. The real Shen Qingqiu was noted for being a scathing teacher with high standards in the arts.

Shen Yuan's Shen Qingqiu has an inner monologue rife with witty commentary and criticism, pop culture references, and swear words. He's easily shocked and disturbed, but hides his face with a fan to maintain an air of distance and serenity. He's relatively lazy and interested in touring the world of PIDW and seeing its creatures. He's also kinder than the original Shen Qingqiu, and the disciples of Qing Jing Peak become devoted and energetic students under his leadership.

==== Luo Binghe ====
Voice actor (Chinese): Shen Dawei ; Voice actor (Japanese): Kaji Yuki

The protagonist of Proud Immortal Demon Way. The original Luo Binghe rose from humble beginnings to the top of the world, achieving a three-digit harem. In this story, however, he begins as a young disciple who manages to stay sweet and positive despite the mistreatment he has endured. His tragic experiences have already planted a dark seed that could germinate, but his greatest desires are love and recognition.

When Shen Qingqiu has a change of heart and shows him his kindness he is willing to forget any past offense; now his goal is to become stronger to protect his master and stay by his side.

=== Secondary Characters ===
Cang Qiong Mountain Sect Members

The sect has twelve mountains, each with their own leader and specialty. Not all the peak lords are named in the novel, particularly Wan Jian Peak who forges the sect's swords and Ku Xing Peak who practice asceticism or monk-like cultivation. Each generations of peak lords shares a character name. The current generation set in the novel uses Qing (清).

Yue Qingyuan (岳清源)

Sect Leader and Peak Lord of Qiong Ding Peak (Legislation and Diplomacy). A mild mannered man who is rumored to be the most powerful cultivator in this era besides the protagonist. He does not need to draw his sword to win a fight.

Shang Qinghua (尚清華)

Peak Lord of An Ding (Administration and Logistics) and another transmigrator. He is known as Airplane Shooting Towards the Sky, the author of Proud Immortal Demon Way.

Liu Qingge (柳清歌)

Peak Lord of Bai Zhan (Martial Arts). A fierce fighter given the title of War God. Unlike other peaks that have the peak lord choose their successor, Bai Zhan chooses their sect leader after a fight to determine who is the strongest disciple. Liu Qingge is said to be incredibly beautiful. He originally dies of qi deviation in Proud Immortal Demon Way, but is saved by Shen Yuan in the Scum Villain timeline.

Mu Qingfang (木清芳)

Peak Lord of Qian Cao (Medicine and Healing). A doctor who often has to mediate between peaks. He is a peak lord who participates in the sower investigation arc to create a cure for the demonic illness.

Qi Qingqi (齊清萋)

Peak Lord of Xian Shu. This peak is not known to have a specific specialty, but it is special as an all-female peak.

Shen Qingqiu (Jiu) (沈清秋 (九)）

Referred to as “original goods” by Shen Yuan, he is the scum villain of PIDW, originally a slave to the Qiu Household, then a disciple to demonic cultivator, Wu Yanzi, then finally a disciple of Qing Jing Peak, afterwards its peak lord. Affectionately called by Yue Qingyuan as “Xiao-Jiu” (小九). Replaced by Shen Yuan in the Scum Villain timeline.

Ning Yingying (寧嬰嬰)

Disciple of Shen Qingqiu. One of the few original characters in the novel that treated Luo Binghe with kindness and respect. She is bubbly and outgoing girl. In PIDW, she was one of the harem members.

Ming Fan (明颿)

Disciple of Shen Qingqiu. The primary bully of Luo Binghe that inflicts punishments and taunts. He was originally killed by being fed to ants but survives in the new timeline.

Liu Mingyan (柳溟煙)

Disciple of Qi Qingqi and said to be a peerless beauty. She wears a cloth face mask to hide her face. In PIDW, she was one of the harem members. In the new timeline, she is credited with being the writer of Regrets of Chunsan, a novel about the dramatization of Shen Qingqiu and Luo Binghe's relationship.

Important Demons

Mobei-jun (漠北君)

The Demon Lord of the Northern Desert. He has ice powers and is able to teleport through rips in space. After Luo Binghe rises to power, Mobei-jun ends up being his right hand man due to Shang Qinghua's intel.

Meng Mo (夢魔)

A dream demon that teaches Luo Binghe how to manipulate dreams. He does not have a physical body and will dissipate if not it someone's mind.

Sha Hualing (紗華鈴)

Saintess of the Demon Clan who attacks Cang Qiong Peak. One of her minions poisons Shen Qingqiu with "Without a Cure" after the fight. She was originally one of Luo Binghe's harem members.

Xin Mo (心魔)

The demonic blade that Luo Binghe finds in the Endless Abyss. He uses the sword to cut rips into space to return to the human world. It feeds off his negative emotions and amplifies demonic qi.

== Novel editions ==
Pinsin Studio released the first physical copies of Scum Villain Self Saving System in Taiwan on July 25, 2017. A five-year anniversary edition was released on July 28, 2022 with refreshed cover art by the same publisher. This edition included a normal edition and a special edition with merchandising.

A Simplified Chinese release opened for pre-orders on October 24, 2025, published under the title of The Tale of Cang Qiong Mountain (Chinese: 苍穹山记；pinyin: Cāng Qióng Shān Jì) with over 20,000 words of new content. It will be two hard cover novels with new art for the covers and slip cases. Extra merchandise includes an autographed note from the author.

It has been translated into several languages: English, Spanish, Thai, Korean, Vietnamese, French, Russian, Italian, and Japanese. Many of these translations had two releases, one with only the paperback novel and a special edition with additional merchandise, such as posters and bookmarks.

The English version was published in 2021 by Seven Seas Danmei in four volumes. Each volume is printed in large trim with deluxe paper, french flaps, spot gloss covers, black-and-white interior illustrations, a glossary and a name guide. It was translated by Faelicy and Lily, who had started to translate it online before Seven Seas bought the rights to their translation. The art was done entirely by Xiao Tong Kong, also known as Velinxi; this art has been reused in other European versions. All four of the English volumes debuted on the New York Times Bestseller list and it is the only English Adaptation of MXTX’s series to have done so. Many people who pre-ordered the special edition of volume 4 did not end up receiving a copy due to the limited printing.

Seven Seas Entertainment released a limited time print for the deluxe hardcover box set on February 17, 2026. It was a re-release of the paperback versions and did not have the extra content that MXTX published for the Simplified Chinese print.

== Adaptations ==
=== Donghua ===
On September 10, 2020 a 3D animated donghua adaptation was aired on Tencent Video with ten episodes under the name Chuan Shu Zijiu Zhinan or Scumbag System. The adaptation remained faithful to the source material and covered up to the Immortal Alliance Conference arc. Streaming rights were bought by Crunchyroll and it was released on the platform on September 5, 2025. The opening sequence theme is called Song of Unsaid Words (忘言歌) by Zhao Lei from the band RISE. The ending sequence is called Retreating from Spring Mountain (却春山) by Zhu Zirong.

A second season was hinted with a post credit scene after the finale, but there has been no release date. This also included a preview poster for the character of Mobei-jun that did not appear in the first season.

In 2023 it was dubbed into Japanese with a weekly schedule with WOWOW. The transmission started on October 18 and lasted seven weeks.

=== Other ===
Scum Villain is the least adapted of MXTX's three works. It is the only one that did not have a filmed live action, audio drama, and continued donghua. Fans of the show have made unofficial adaptations including a manhua published to Webtoons and an audio drama published on the audio drama site, Mao-er.

== Themes ==
Scum Villain's Self Saving System and MXTX's other works have been featured in scholarly articles exploring sociological themes.

=== Sexuality ===
Since the work is a danmei, the main focus of this series revolves around a homosexual relation between two men and the story is intended for a female audience. As is common in the danmei genre, Luo Binghe and Shen Qingqiu maintain a static penetrator/penetrated (攻/受) relationship. The work satirizes this to some level, with Shen Qingqiu purposefully taking the second position to preserve Luo Binghe's masculinity, and the System notifying Shen Qingqiu directly that the target audience of the novel has shifted from male to female (presumably due to the romance between him and Luo Binghe).

The author seeks to deconstruct several aspects related to compulsory heterosexuality and some perspectives about homosexuality, demonstrated by the narrator, Shen Qingqiu. He has a rigid vision of heterosexuality and masculinity that he brings up on several occasions; however, his actions often go against his words. He paradoxically views himself as heterosexual, despite being attracted to Luo Binghe. He also thinks his influence is the reason Luo Binghe is gay.

=== Gender ===
This story is a deconstruction of masculinity seen in the two main characters. Luo Binghe shifts from a "stallion protagonist", emperor of the world with a large harem as an emperor, to taking on a mix of roles in the novel. He still becomes the emperor of the realm but shows traditionally feminine traits like taking care of the house. Meanwhile, Shen Qingqiu is pushed into typically feminine roles, and we are capable of appreciating his change of view about masculinity when his relationship with Luo Binghe starts taking a romantic turn. In the extras, the Scum Villain universe Luo Binghe is referred to as "Bingmei", a pun on "little sister", while the Proud Immortal Demon Way Luo Binghe is referred to as "Bingge", a pun on "older brother".

This story also touches on the role of women in the story by showing that, after being separated from their role as a conquest for Luo Binghe, they acquire greater intelligence and independence. Despite this, the presence and development of female characters is scarce, especially for Liu Mingyuan, who despite being one of the main female characters, has little to no depth of her own outside of her familial ties with Liu Qingge.

=== Writing style ===
The writing style of this novel has a marked national style with the use of slang and expressions typical of the spaces of Chinese web novels (for which several translations have considered it necessary to put a glossary that explains them to the international public). This modern vocabulary also helps to differentiate the protagonist from the world to which he has been transmigrated.

It is characterized by phraseological units, which seek to enliven the narrative and express profound ideas with simple words. It also uses various syntactic resources such as rhetorical questions, repetitions, transformations of sentence structure and double negatives that are characteristic of Chinese slang.

== See also ==
- Danmei
- Grandmaster of Demonic Cultivation
- Heaven Official's Blessing
