= Mo Dao Zu Shi =

Chinese animated series

- Also known as: The Founder of Diabolism
- Created by: Mo Xiang Tong Xiu
- Based on: Grandmaster of Demonic Cultivation by Mo Xiang Tong Xiu
- Written by: Liang Sha; Liu Xing; Zhu Ke
- Directed by: Xiong Ke (Note: Chief Director (总导演)); Ma Chendi (Note: Chief Episode Director (总演出))
- Voices of: Zhang Jie; Bian Jiang
- Opening theme: "Drunken Dreams of the Past" by Lin Zhixuan; "As Promised" by Lin Zhixuan
- Ending theme: "Asking the Zither" by Yin Lin; "No Envies" by S.I.N.G; "Unchanging Youth" by R1SE; "Unforgettable" by Jane Zhang
- Composers: Sun Yujing; Weng Teng; Feng Shuo
- Country of origin: China
- Original language: Mandarin
- No. of seasons: 3
- No. of episodes: 35

Production
- Executive producer: Xu Yuanyuan
- Producers: Jin Wenjun; Wang Juan; Liu Xing; Zhu Ke; Yan Mengya
- Running time: 24 minutes
- Production companies: Tencent Penguin Pictures; B.C May Pictures

Original release
- Network: Tencent Video
- Release: July 9, 2018 – October 16, 2021

Related
- The Untamed

Mo Dao Zu Shi (Chinese: 魔道祖师; pinyin: Módào Zǔshī; lit. 'Demonic Path Ancestral Master') is a Chinese donghua series based on the novel of the same name written by Mo Xiang Tong Xiu (墨香铜臭). It is produced by Tencent Penguin Pictures and B.C May Pictures. The series depicts a fictional xianxia world where humans attempt to cultivate to a state of immortality, known as xian (仙). The protagonist of the series, Wei Wuxian, due to certain circumstances, deviated from the conventional cultivation path to xian and eventually created Guidao (the Ghost Path).

The first season, titled Qian Chen Pian (前尘篇), aired from July 9 to October 6, 2018, on Tencent Video for 15 episodes. The second season, titled Xian Yun Pian (羡云篇), aired from August 3 to 31, 2019, for 8 episodes. A chibi series, titled Mo Dao Zu Shi Q, aired from July 31, 2020, to January 29, 2021, and ran for 30 episodes. The third and final season, titled Wán Jié Piān (完结篇), aired from August 7 to October 16, 2021, for 12 episodes. The first two seasons were released on Crunchyroll on December 11, 2024.

== Synopsis ==
Despite his efforts during the Sunshot Campaign to bring down the tyrannical Wen Clan, Wei Wuxian (魏无羡) was feared by the world for the unorthodox cultivation path he created. Thirteen years after he was killed, he is summoned into the body of a man called Mo Xuanyu (莫玄羽), who was rejected by his clan and despised by his family, therefore sacrificing his own body to Wei Wuxian so he would be avenged. It is in the Mo house where Wei Wuxian comes across a dismembered left arm causing death and havoc. His attempts to uncover the mystery of the left arm will guide him to a familiar face from the past with whom he will embark on a journey that will lead them to unravel what lies behind the tragic events that caused the deaths of so many, including Wei Wuxian himself.

== Episodes ==
Season	Episodes	Originally released	
Season	Episodes	First released	Last released
1	15	July 9, 2018	October 6, 2018
2	8	August 3, 2019	August 31, 2019
3	12	August 7, 2021	October 16, 2021

== Characters ==
=== Main characters ===
Wei Ying (魏婴), courtesy name Wuxian (无羡) Voiced by: Lu Zhixing (Chinese drama cd), Zhang Jie (Chinese dub), Shim Gyu-hyuk (Korean dub), Tatsuhisa Suzuki (Japanese drama cd), Ryohei Kimura (Japanese dub)

Wei Wuxian is the title protagonist of the series. He is the founder of the Demonic Path (鬼道), earning him the title Yiling Laozu (夷陵老祖). He is intelligent, optimistic, mischievous but good-hearted. Talented and infamous, his unorthodox methods and unrestrained nature put him at odds with the rest of the cultivation world. Orphaned at a young age and taken in by his parents’ friend Jiang Fengmian, Wei Wuxian is raised in the Yunmeng Jiang Clan, where he becomes head disciple and grows up with Jiang Cheng and Jiang Yanli. During his education as a teenager, he travels to Gusu to study at Cloud Recesses and meets Lan Wangji, with whom he develops a tentative friendship, and later misunderstandings.
After the Qishan Wen Clan launches an aggressive campaign to subjugate all other cultivation clans, Wei Wuxian becomes a war hero through his use of demonic methods. Other clans covet and distrust his novel power; he further antagonizes them by protecting the survivors of the Wen Clan and dies an enemy of the cultivation world. Thirteen years later, he is reborn in the body of Mo Xuanyu and must unravel a murder mystery alongside his oldest friend, Lan Wangji.

Lan Zhan (蓝湛), courtesy name Wangji (忘机). Voiced by: Wei Chao (Chinese drama cd), Bian Jiang (Chinese dub), Ryu Seung-gon (Korean dub), Satoshi Hino (Japanese drama cd), Shinnosuke Tachibana (Japanese dub)

Lan Wangji, titled Hanguang-Jun (含光君), is the second young master and one of the Twin Jades of the Gusu Lan Clan. Despite having an exquisite bearing and incomparable beauty, his strict and aloof nature makes him appear nonchalant and distant. He is renowned for his skill in battle and for his strong moral compass, known to be "where the chaos is" for aiding citizens without caring for fame or glory of Night Hunts. During his youth, he has various encounters with Wei Wuxian wherein they appear to have very little similarities in personalities and interests.

At the beginning of the story, Lan Wangji is a teacher of Lan Clan disciples; he first appears at Mo Village when they are attacked by a mysterious demonic arm, and reunites with the resurrected Wei Wuxian whom he protects and grows closer to as they unravel the mystery.

=== Gusu Lan Clan ===
Lan Clan of Gusu (姑苏蓝氏) is a cultivation clan based in the Cloud Recesses (云深不知处), a residence on a remote mountain outside the city of Gusu. All disciples wear a white band across their foreheads. Additional embroidery of the clan emblem adorns the headbands of inner disciples, who are from the inner family.

Clan Motto: Upright; Righteous (雅正)

Clan Emblem: Rolling Clouds (卷云纹)

Lan Huan (蓝涣), courtesy name Xichen (曦臣). Voiced by: Wang Kai (Chinese drama cd), Jin Xian (Chinese dub), Kim Young-sun (Korean dub), Morikawa Toshiyuki (Japanese dub, drama cd)

Lan Xichen is the leader of the Lan Clan. Titled Zewu-Jun (泽芜君), he is one of the Three Zun (三尊) alongside his sworn brothers Nie Mingjue and Jin Guangyao, the latter of with whom he shares an especially close relationship. He has a warm and trusting personality.

Lan Qiren (蓝启仁) Voiced by: Song Ming (Chinese drama cd), Liu Cong (Chinese dub), Lee Chang-min (Korean dub), Shingaki Tarusuke (Japanese drama cd), Sakamaki Mitsuhiro (Japanese dub)

Lan Qiren is an elder of the Lan Clan, a strict teacher known for producing outstanding students. After his brother Qingheng Jun (青蘅君) went into seclusion, he acted as de facto leader of the clan. He also raised his nephews Lan Xichen and Lan Wangji whom he taught to tirelessly learn and obey the rules of the clan.

Lan Yuan (蓝愿), courtesy name Sizhui (思追) Voiced by: Qian Wenqing (Chinese drama cd), Chengzhang Taikang (Chinese dub), Nam Doh-hyeong (Korean dub), Yūsuke Kobayashi (Japanese drama cd), Shimba Tsuchiya (Japanese dub)

Lan Sizhui is a teenage inner disciple of the Lan Clan. He is intelligent and even-tempered. He admires Lan Wangji whom he sees as a big brother or father figure and quickly takes a liking to “Mo Xuanyu” as Wei Wuxian. He is close friends with Lan Jingyi and later with Jin Ling.

Lan Jingyi (蓝景仪) Voiced by: Cao Xupeng (Chinese drama cd), Wang Chenguang (Chinese dub), Jeong Joo-won (Korean dub), Hiro Shimono (Japanese drama cd), Soma Saito (Japanese dub)

Lan Jingyi is a disciple of the Lan Clan. He is short-tempered and dislikes rule breakers. He is close friends with Lan Sizhui and later with Jin Ling.

=== Lanling Jin Clan ===
Jin Clan of Lanling (兰陵金氏) is a cultivation clan based in Golden Carp Tower, Lanling.

Meng Yao (孟瑶), legitimized as Jin Guangyao (金光瑶) Voiced by: Jiang Guangtao (Chinese drama cd), Yang Tianxiang (Chinese dub), Lee Ho-san (Korean dub), Akira Ishida (Japanese dub, drama cd)

Titled Lianfang-Zun (敛芳尊), Jin Guangyao is the leader of the Jin Clan and the first Chief Cultivator (仙督), the leader of all cultivation clans. Initially illegitimate, he was formally recognized by his father Jin Guangshan and accepted into the Jin family due to his wartime accomplishments. He is Jin Ling’s paternal uncle and also one of Three Zun alongside his sworn brothers Lan Xichen and Nie Mingjue. He is an intelligent and competent ruler, but many look down on him due to his status as the son of a prostitute. He shares an especially close relationship with Lan Xichen due to the latter’s nonjudgmental nature.

Jin Ling (金凌), courtesy name Rulan (如兰) Voiced by: Li Lanling (Chinese drama cd), Su Shangqing (Chinese dub), Lee Kyung-tae (Korean dub), Ayumu Murase (Japanese drama cd), Yuki Kaji (Japanese dub)

Jin Ling is a disciple of the Jin Clan and the heir to the Jin clan. He is the son of Jiang Yanli and Jin Zixuan and the nephew of both Jin Guangyao and Jiang Cheng. He has a spiritual dog named Fairy, given to him by Jin Guangyao. He is prideful and short-tempered and initially has troublegetting along with his peers and he doesn't have many friends his age. He takes a liking to Wei Wuxian when he returns as "Mo Xuanyu." He also becomes close friends with Lan Sizhui and Lan Jingyi.

Jin Guangshan (金光善) Voiced by: Xiao Tan (Chinese drama cd), Li Longbin (Chinese dub), Park Sang-hoon (Korean dub), Sho Hayami (Japanese dub, drama cd)

Jin Guangshan was the former leader of the Jin Clan whose ambitions rivaled Wen Ruohan's. He viciously punished the remainder of the Wen Clan after the war and clashed with Wei Wuxian over their treatment. A womanizer, he had three known children from affairs: Meng Yao, Mo Xuanyu, and Qin Su. Jin Zixuan was his only legitimate son until he legitimized Meng Yao.

Jin Zixuan (金子轩) Voiced by: Liu Mingyue (Chinese drama cd), Gu Jiangshan (Chinese du ), Kim Hyun-wook (Korean dub), Hiroki Takahashi (Japanese drama cd), Kenji Akabane (Japanese dub)

Jin Zixuan was Jin Guangshan's son and heir to the Jin Clan, as well as Jiang Yanli's husband and the father of Jin Ling. He initially clashed with Wei Wuxian due to his brash personality.

An outstanding talent, Jin Zixuan initially disdained the betrothal he had to Jiang Yanli, whom he viewed as unremarkable, but he gradually grew to love her after understanding her true character. He died when Jin Ling was still a toddler.

Qin Su (秦愫)

Qin Su is the wife of Jin Guangyao and the daughter of Qin Cangye, the leader of the Laoling Qin Clan, a subsidiary of the Jin Clan. They married after Jin Guangyao saved her life during the war.

Mo Xuanyu (莫玄羽) Voiced by: Tong Xin (Chinese drama cd), Zhang Jie (Chinese dub), Shim Gyu-hyuk (Korean dub), Nakayama Kazuhisa (Japanese drama cd), Ryohei Kimura (Japanese dub)

Mo Xuanyu was one of Jin Guangshan's illegitimate sons and a former disciple of the Jin Clan. He sacrificed his soul to summon Wei Wuxian to exact revenge on the Mo family for abusing him. In his living days, he was seen as a lunatic and a "cut-sleeve."

=== Qinghe Nie Clan ===
Nie Clan of Qinghe (清河聂氏) is a cultivation clan that resides in the Unclean Realm.

Nie Huaisang (聂怀桑) Voiced by: Qi Sijia (Chinese drama cd), Liu Sanmu (Chinese dub), Kim Myung-jun (Korean dub), Yoshitsugu Matsuoka (Japanese drama cd), Natsuki Hanae (Japanese dub)

Nie Huaisang is the current leader of the Nie Clan and the younger half-brother of Nie Mingjue, as well as an old school friend of Wei Wuxian with whom he often slacked off. Known for his incompetence, he is widely called Head Shaker (一问三不知, lit. 'one question, three "don't know"s').

Nie Mingjue (聂明玦) Voiced by: Feng Sheng [zh] (Chinese drama cd), Guan Shu'ai (Chinese dub), Lee Hyeon (Korean dub), Kenjiro Tsuda (Japanese drama cd), Hiroshi Shirokuma (Japanese dub)

Titled Chifeng-Zun (赤锋尊), Nie Mingjue was the former leader of the Nie Clan and the older half-brother of Nie Huaisang. He is one of the Three Zun alongside his sworn brothers Jin Guangyao and Lan Xichen. He was strict with a bad temper and an intolerance for anything deviating from his definition of morality. He publicly experienced a qi deviation, common in his clan, and disappeared soon thereafter. He is presumed dead at the beginning of the novel.

=== Qishan Wen Clan ===
Wen Clan of Qishan (岐山温氏) is a cultivation clan based in the Nightless City (不夜天城). The clan was destroyed during the Sunshot Campaign, where some survivors, specifically Wen Ning and Wen Qing's family branch, were taken under the wing of Wuxian.

Clan Emblem: the Sun, meaning to compete with the sun and to live as long as the sun (与日争辉，与日同寿)

Wen Ning (温宁), courtesy name Qionglin (琼林). Voiced by: Teng Xin (Chinese drama cd), Shao Tong (Chinese dub), Kim Ji-yul (Korean dub), Soichiro Hoshi (Japanese drama cd), Nobunaga Shimazaki (Japanese dub)

Wen Ning is a branch family member of the Wen Clan and Wen Qing's younger brother. When he was alive, he was a stutterer and shy around people. In his youth, he met Wei Wuxian during an archery tournament, and later protected both him and Jiang Cheng during the Siege of Lotus Pier. After the downfall of the Wen clan, he was sent to one of the Jin Clan’s forced labor camps and murdered. Wei Wuxian later resurrected him as a fierce corpse, and he became known as the Ghost General (鬼将军).

Wen Qing (温情) Voiced by: Shan Xin (Chinese drama cd), Qiao Shiyu (Chinese dub), Kim Yul (Korean dub), Chiwa Saito (Japanese drama cd), Ayako Kawasumi (Japanese dub)

Wen Qing was a branch family member of the Wen clan and Wen Ning's older sister. She was the greatest physician of the Wen Clan. When Wei Wuxian and Jiang Cheng were on the run, after Wen Ning's insistence she sheltered them at the risk of being punished for betrayal to the main Wen Clan.

Wen Ruohan (温若寒) Voiced by: Chen Siyu (Chinese drama cd), Yan Ming (Chinese dub), Kim Jinhong (Korean dub), Kenji Nomura (Japanese drama cd), Kenta Miyake (Japanese dub)

Wen Ruohan was the previous clan leader of the Wen Clan, and father to Wen Xu and Wen Chao. He was a known megalomaniac with an unpredictable temper.

Wen Xu (温旭)

Wen Xu was the eldest son of Wen Ruohan. He burnt the Cloud Recesses during the Wen Clan’s aggressive expansive campaign. Eventually, he was decapitated by Nie Mingjue.

Wen Chao (温晁) Voiced by: Hao Xianghai (Chinese drama cd), Liang Xiaoqiang (Chinese dub), Kim Jin-hong (Korean dub), Sugiyama Noriaki (Japanese drama cd), Hiroyuki Yoshino (Japanese dub)

Wen Chao was the youngest son of Wen Ruohan. He enjoyed harassing women and clashed with Wei Wuxian who protected Mianmian (绵绵) from him. He laid siege to Lotus Pier, successfully occupying it and killing Jiang Fengmian, Yu Ziyuan, and many other cultivators. This forced Wei Wuxian, Jiang Cheng and Jiang Yanli into hiding. He later hunted down Wei Wuxian and threw him into the Burial Mounds (乱葬岗).

Zhao Zhuliu (赵逐流), renamed as Wen Zhuliu (温逐流) Voiced by: Wang Minna (Chinese drama cd), Hu Yajie (Chinese dub), Katsuyuki Konishi (Japanese drama cd), Keikō Sakai (Japanese dub)

Wen Zhuliu was a servant of the Wen Clan and adopted into the Wen family. He was one of Wen Chao's protectors. He was a formidable cultivator and commonly known as Core-Melting Hand (化丹手) due to his ability to melt a Golden Core.

Wang Lingjiao (王灵娇) Voiced by: Yan Mengmeng (Chinese drama cd), Qiu Qiu (Chinese dub), Gang Sihyeon (Korean dub), Shizuka Itō (Japanese drama cd), Kana Asumi (Japanese dub)

Wang Lingjiao was a former maid of Wen Chao's official wife and later his favorite lover. She was arrogant and pompous. She vindictively tried to sacrifice Mianmian after seeing Wen Chao flirt with her and later tried to intimidate Yu Ziyuan.

=== Yunmeng Jiang Clan ===
Jiang Clan of Yunmeng (云梦江氏) is a cultivation clan located in Yunmeng's Lotus Pier (莲花坞).

Clan Motto: Knowing it's impossible, attempt to achieve it (明知不可为而为之)

Clan Emblem: Nine petal lotus (九瓣莲)

Jiang Cheng (江澄), courtesy name Wanyin (晚吟), Voiced by: Peng Yao (Chinese drama cd), Guo Haoran (Chinese dub), Jang Min-hyeok (Korean dub), Hikaru Midorikawa (Japanese dub, drama cd)

Titled Sandu Shengshou (三毒圣手), Jiang Cheng is the current leader of the Jiang Clan. He is the brother of Jiang Yanli, the martial brother of Wei Wuxian, and the maternal uncle of Jin Ling. After the fall of Lotus Pier, he became the new clan leader and played a major role in the Sunshot Campaign. After the war, he grew apart from Wei Wuxian, due to a series of events wherein Wei Wuxian made the choice to defect from the Jiang Clan in order to save the Wen remnants post-war and protect the Jiang Clan from facing repercussions for this choice. At the start of the novel, it is rumored that Jiang Cheng is fixated on anyone using a similar cultivation method as Wei Wuxian, as he believes Wei Wuxian will find a way to return to the world of the living.

Jiang Yanli (江厌离) Voiced by: Qiao Shiyu (Chinese drama cd), Li Shimeng (Chinese dub), Kang Eun-ae (Korean dub), Ayana Taketatsu (Japanese drama cd), Saori Hayami (Japanese dub)

Jiang Yanli was the daughter of Jiang Fengmian and Yu Ziyuan, the older sister of Jiang Cheng, and the martial sister of Wei Wuxian. She was known to be of average looks and weak cultivation base, but was a very kind person with a penchant for cooking. Jiang Cheng and Wei Wuxian idolized her. She was initially smitten with Jin Zixuan, but her father Jiang Fengmian broke off the engagement after realizing that Jin Zixuan felt no affection for his daughter. After the Sunshot Campaign, Jin Zixuan developed feelings for her, and they were wed. They had a son, Jin Ling, but she died to save Wei Wuxian's life during the Bloodbath in Nightless City, when Jin Ling was only a baby.

Jiang Fengmian (江枫眠) Voiced by: Zhang Zhen (Chinese drama cd), Tang Shuiyu (Chinese dub), Seo Won-seok (Korean dub), Kenyū Horiuchi (Japanese drama cd), Kenji Hamada (Japanese dub)

Jiang Fengmian was the former leader of the Jiang Clan, the husband of Yu Ziyuan, and the father of Jiang Cheng and Jiang Yanli. He was friends with Wei Wuxian's father, Wei Changze, who was a servant of the clan. He was also familiar with Wei Wuxian's mother, Cangse Sanren, whom he had once held romantic feelings for. Upon hearing that both had died on a Night Hunt, he dedicated himself to finding their son. He eventually found Wei Wuxian on the streets of Yiling and fed him a piece of melon before taking him home to Lotus Pier. Because he favored Wei Wuxian in comparison to his own son, Jiang Cheng, he and Yu Ziyuan often argued. Along with his wife, he died at the Wen Clan's hands during the Massacre at the Lotus Pier.

Yu Ziyuan (虞紫鸢) Voiced by: Zhang Kai (Chinese drama cd), Ji Guanlin (Chinese dub), Jeon Suk-kyeong (Korean dub), Atsuoko Tanaka (Japanese drama cd), Takako Honda (Japanese dub)

Yu Ziyuan was the wife of Jiang Fengmian, and mother of Jiang Cheng and Jiang Yanli. She was harsh on her family and clan’s disciples. Titled Violet Spider (紫蜘蛛), she was a formidable and famous cultivator. Due to her husband's favoritism of Wei Wuxian over their own son, she had a poor relationship with Wei Wuxian. Upon the Wen Clan's invasion of Lotus Pier and Wang Lingjiao demand for Wei Wuxian’s punishment, Yu Ziyuan whipped the latter but ultimately refused to cut off his hand. She subsequently fought the invaders to the death. During her final moments, she told Wei Wuxian to protect Jiang Cheng with his life.

=== Yi City Arc ===
During Wei Wuxian and Lan Wangji's mission, they arrived at Yi City (义城) and bumped into Lan Sizhui, Lan Jingyi, Jin Ling and some other disciples from different clans during their night hunt. From there, they uncover the truth of Xiao Xingchen's death.

Xue Yang (薛洋), courtesy name Chengmei (成美). Voiced by: Hui Long (Chinese drama cd), Kondo Takashi (Japanese drama cd), Kōki Uchiyama (Japanese dub)

Xue Yang is a guest of the Jin Clan who recreated the destroyed half of the Yin Tiger Tally. He is found by Xiao Xingchen and A-Qing while injured and unconscious. As the two did not know his real identity, he used Xiao Xingchen's blindness to his advantage and ended up living with them for years through deception. However, he was exposed when A-Qing witnessed his fight with Song Lan. He then fought with Xiao Xingchen and revealed the truth. This caused Xiao Xingchen to commit suicide. As Xue Yang was unable to turn him into a fierce corpse, he stored his shattered soul in a spirit-trapping pouch. He later found A-Qing and killed her by digging her eyes and cutting her tongue out.

Xiao Xingchen (晓星尘) Voiced by: Chen Hao (Chinese drama cd), Shinnosuke Tachibana (Japanese drama cd), Kaito Ishikawa (Japanese dub)

Xiao Xingchen was one of Baoshan Sanren's (抱山散人) disciples who left the mountain for the mortal world. At some point he became blind, giving his eyes to his best friend, Song Lan. Xiao Xinghen first met A-Qing, then found an injured person, Xue Yang, lying unconscious on the street, and the three of them started living together. Due to Xiao Xingchen's blindness, he neither recognized the man he had saved as the criminal Xue Yang, nor that the latter had tricked him into killing people. When he found out that Xue Yang had tricked him into killing Song Lan, he committed suicide, shattering his soul.

Song Lan (宋岚), courtesy name Zichen (子琛). Voiced by: Wu Lei (Chinese drama cd), Shinichiro Miki (Japanese drama cd), Takuya Eguchi (Japanese dub)

Song Lan is a cultivator from Baixue Temple and a friend of Xiao Xingchen. His eyes were blinded by Xue Yang when Baixue Temple was destroyed, but Xiao Xingchen dug out his own eyes, transferred them to him, and then disappeared. While searching for Xiao Xingchen after his sudden disappearance, he ran into Xue Yang first. Xue Yang cut out his tongue and tricked Xiao Xingchen into killing him. Xue Yang turned him into a fierce corpse, but Wei Wuxian managed to return his consciousness.

A-Qing (阿箐) Voiced by: Yang Ning (Chinese drama cd), Nie Xiying (Chinese dub), Shitaya Noriko (Japanese drama cd), Aoi Yūki (Japanese dub)

A-Qing was a young girl who lived in the streets and pretended to be blind thanks to her white pupils. She encountered Xiao Xingchen and started living with him and Xue Yang. She eventually saw Xue Yang trick Xiao Xingchen into killing Song Lan, and ran away at Xiao Xingchen's request. Xue Yang found her and carved out her eyes and tongue, killing her. Her ghost later tried to warn Wei Wuxian, Lan Wangji, and the juniors who had entered coffin city about Xue Yang. To learn more about her story, Wei Wuxian used a rite to see, feel, and hear her memories.

== Soundtrack ==
No.	Title	Lyrics	Music	Singers	Length
1.	"Drunken Dreams of the Past (醉梦前尘)" (Opening Theme Song (Seasons 1 and 2))	Sun Yujing	Sun Yujing	Terry Lin	04:31
2.	"Drunken Dreams of the Past (醉梦前尘)" (Wei Wuxian and Lan Wangji Duet Version)	Sun Yujing	Sun Yujing	Zhang Jie and Bian Jiang	03:42
3.	"Asking the Zither (问琴)" (Ending Theme Song (Season 1; Eps 1–8, 14–15))	Sun Yujing	Sun Yujing, Feng Shuo	Yin Lin	03:16
4.	"No Envies (不羡)" (Ending Theme Song (Season 1; Eps 9–13))	Miao Boyang	He Liang	S.I.N.G	04:28
5.	"Unchanging Youth (少年如故)" (Ending Theme Song (Season 2))	Cheng Yi, He Siwei	Lin Hai	R1SE	04:20
6.	"As Promised (如许)" (Opening Theme Song (Season 3))	Luan Jie	Tan Xuan	Lin Zhixuan	04:18
7.	"Unforgettable (無忘)" (Ending Theme Song (Season 3))	Sun Yujing	Sun Yujing	Jane Zhang	04:45
8.	"Envying Clouds (羡云)" (Wei Wuxian and Lan Wangji's Theme Song)	Sun Yujing	Sun Yujing	Hita	03:00
9.	"Envying Clouds (羡云)" (Wei Wuxian and Lan Wangji's Theme Song Duet Version)	Sun Yujing	Sun Yujing	Zhang Jie and Bian Jiang	03:05
10.	"With You (与君同尘)" (Lan Wangji Character Song)	Shi Zhou	Oliver Kim/Ethan Jin/Jason Lee	Ayanga	04:33
11.	"Creating Change (造化)" (Wei Wuxian Character Song)	Ye Xiaomo	Oliver Kim/Ethan Jin/Jason Lee	Liu Yuning	04:38

== Reception ==
The series received overwhelmingly positive reviews for its high production quality and storyline, and amassed a notable Internet fandom both in China and overseas. On Douban, Mo Dao Zu Shi rated 8.8 out of 10, making it one of the best received donghua series in China in 2018.

The series has since become a worldwide hit, ultimately generating 4.63 billion views on Tencent's streaming platform as of July 2022. The series holds a rating of 9.5 out of 10 on both Tencent and WeTV platforms, cementing its status as one of the most acclaimed donghua series in the world.

=== Awards and nominations ===
Year	Award	Category	Nominated work	Results	Ref.
2018	12th Tencent Video Star Awards	Most Popular Fictional Idol	Wei Wuxian	Won	
2018	12th Tencent Video Star Awards	Best Voice Actor	Zhang Jie	Won	
2018	12th Tencent Video Star Awards	Reputable Donghua of the Year	Mo Dao Zu Shi	Won	
2018	15th China Animation Golden Dragon Award	Best Serial Animation Award (Gold Award)	Mo Dao Zu Shi	Won	
2018	Golden Bud – The Third Network Film And Television Festival	Popular Animation Award	Mo Dao Zu Shi	Won	
2019	7th China Xi'an International Original Animation Competition; Xinguang Award	Best New Animation	Mo Dao Zu Shi	Won	
2019	12th Xiamen International Animation Festival	Best Donghua (Silver Award)	Mo Dao Zu Shi	Won	
2019	20th China Video Awards	Donghua of the Year	Mo Dao Zu Shi	Won	
2019	Golden Bud – The Fourth Network Film And Television Festival	Best Animation	Mo Dao Zu Shi	Nominated	
2019	Tencent Video All Star Awards	Fictional Character of the Year	Lan Wangji	Won	

== International broadcast ==
Network	Country	Notes/Ref.
Laftel	South Korea	
FAN Film	Russia	
WOWOW	Japan	
Tokyo MX	Japan	
BS11	Japan	
Amazon Prime	Japan	
Abema TV	Japan	
Rakuten TV	Japan	
YouTube	International	
WeTV	International	
Crunchyroll	International	

Outside China, Mo Dao Zu Shi was officially released by Tencent on its official YouTube channel on August 27, 2019. It was also released by WeTV, a streaming platform for overseas users created by Tencent, under the title of The Founder of Diabolism. The WeTV app provides official subtitles in English, Spanish, Portuguese, Thai, and Indonesian, while YouTube provided subtitles for at least 12 different languages for the first few episodes.

On September 30, 2019, Laftel's Twitter account announced the donghua's South Korean broadcast, both in dubbed and subtitled format. Season 1's subtitled version aired from November 11 to December 29, 2019. while the dubbed version aired from April 3 to June 14, 2020. For Season 2, the subtitled version aired from January 11 to February 2, 2020, while the dubbed version aired from June 28 to July 19, 2020. The dubbed version starred Shim Gyu-huk as Wei Wuxian and Ryu Seung-gon as Lan Wangji. Mo Dao Zu Shi Q subtitled version aired from December 3, 2020, to February 14, 2021.

On September 7, 2020, a dubbed version of the donghua started airing on the Russian cable network FAN Film channel.

In Japan, the subtitled version for Seasons 1 and 2 were broadcast on WOWOW network on September 9 and November 4, 2020, and Season 3 on November 10, 2022. The dubbed version was produced by Aniplex and Sony Music Solutions and starred Ryohei Kimura as Wei Wuxian and Shinnosuke Tachibana as Lan Wangji, with Seasons 1 and 2 airing from January 10 to June 13, 2021. Blu-ray discs for Season 1 came out on April 21, 2021, and Season 2 on June 23, 2021. Both Blu-ray sets include the Japanese dub version as well as the original Chinese audio with Japanese subtitles. Mo Dao Zu Shi Q subtitled version is available for streaming on Rakuten TV. It won 1st place in the Anime Top 5 category during the first half period of Rakuten TV Award 2022, based on the number of units sold from December 2021 to May 2022.

On December 10, 2024, Crunchyroll announced that it would stream the first 2 seasons of the donghua in most countries except for Japan, Korea, mainland China, and Russian speaking territories under the title The Master of Diabolism.
