= Peach Blossom Debt =

2008 novel by Da-Feng-Gua-Guo

- Author: Da-Feng-Gua-Guo
- Language: Traditional Chinese
- Publisher: Uei-Shiang Co., Ltd.
- Publication date: August 2008
- Publication place: Taiwan
- Media type: Book (paperback)
- ISBN: 9789862060971

Peach Blossom Debt
- Author: Da-Feng-Gua-Guo
- Language: Simplified Chinese
- Publisher: China Federation of Literary and Art Circles Publishing Corporation
- Publication date: July 2017
- Publication place: China
- Media type: Book (paperback)
- Pages: 259
- ISBN: 978-7-5190-1123-9

Peach Blossom Debt (Chinese: 桃花债) is a danmei fictional novel written by Da-Feng-Gua-Guo (Chinese: 大风刮过). It was first serialized on Jinjiang (http://www.jjwxc.net/) from January 2007 to August 2007 and first published by Uei-Shiang Co., Ltd. in Taiwan. Its simplified Chinese version was later published by China Federation of Literary and Art Circles Publishing Corporation in July 2016. It was translated into Thai and published in Thailand in December 2016.

Official synopsis:

“All predestined affinities are merely debts to be repaid.”

In his mortal life, Song Yao ate an elixir pill that dropped from the heavens by accident, and thus began his life as an immortal.

After millennia of living in idleness, the Jade Emperor orders Song Yao back to the mortal plane. His task is seemingly simple: to oversee the love trial between two immortal lords. Only when he bids his old friend Hengwen Qingjun farewell at the heavenly gates is he told of his true role on the mortal plane: to steal away the heart of one of the lords, Tianshu Xingjun.

Falling from the skies with no way back, Song Yao can only wonder, who’s really being put on trial here?

== Translation of the Title ==
桃花债 can be directly translated as Peach Blossom Debt. The sense-for-sense translation could be Romance of Love Debt, since peach blossoms are used as a symbol of love in Chinese culture.

== World Setting ==
The world setting of this fiction is based on Chinese local mythology, Taoist culture and Buddhist culture: There are 3 worlds: mortal world of human beings, Heavenly Palace of the immortals (The immortals mainly origin from Taoism) and Western Paradise of Buddhas. Mortal human beings and animals can become immortal by practice Taosiam or Buddhism or, like Song Yao, by taking the elixir pills. Immortals and Buddhas can visit each other in Heavenly Palace and Western Paradise. The souls of both the immortals and the mortals can go through transmigrations or samsara. The immortals' transmigrating as a mortal is a part of their practice or a way to pay the karma/debt for what they have done before.

== Main Characters and terminologies (With Chinese) ==
Immortal Song Yao Yuanjun (Chinese 宋珧元君): The leading character and narrator of this story. He used to be mortal but becomes immortal after he takes an elixir pill unknowingly. His Celestial Title is Guangxu (Chinese广虚, means “Infinite Void”). Throughout the book, the character possesses a couple of human bodies one the name of Li Simling and the other a Daoist priest Guangxu Yuanjun.

Pure Immortal Hengwen Qingjun (Chinese衡文清君): The god of knowledge and talent. His Celestial Title is Hengwen, meaning “Judging one’s knowledge and talent according to his/her literature works”. He asks Song Yao to give him a name of a mortal, Zhao Heng (Chinese 赵衡). Zhao and Song are both the name of ancient Chinese vassal states. Coincidentally, Zhao is also the surname of Empires of Song Dynasty.

Stellar Immortal Tianshu Xingjun (Chinese 天枢星君): The god of mortal emperors. Tianshu (Chinese 天枢) is the ancient name of Dubhe, the brightest star of Plough. In Chinese classic literature, Dubhe is the metaphor for the virtue of an emperor. The character's mortal human body goes by the name of Mu Ruoyan.

Imperial Immortal Nanming Dijun (Chinese 南明帝君): The god of the fortune of mortal empires Nanming (Chinese 南明) is the alias of a Chinese constellation and/or mythological animal Vermilion Bird (Chinese 朱雀). The character's mortal human body goes by the name of Shen Shengling.

Stellar Immortal Taibai (Chinese 太白星君): Taibai is the Chinese name for Venus, the morning star and the star of the West in Chinese Culture. Traditional Chinese astrology believes Venus is linked with war and the overthrow of emperors. However, in many Chinese fantasy fictions (including this one), He is usually described as an old servant and messenger of Jade Emperor.

Jade Emperor (Chinese 玉帝): The ruler of the immortal word Heavenly Palace (Chinese 天庭). He is a deity of Taoism. His image is basically an immortal version of an ancient emperor of China

Queen Mother of the West (Chinese: 王母娘娘, 西王母): The co-ruler of Heavenly Place. She is a deity of Taoism and usually described as a beautiful lady who is in charge of a magical peach orchard of immortality.

Ancient Deity of Grand Supreme (Chinese: 太上老君): A powerful deity in Heavenly Palace. He is a deity of Taoism whose prototype is Laozi. His elixir pills can make mortal human immortal and cure immortals of losing immortal power and severe injury

Stellar Immortal Destiny Mingge Xingjin (Chinese: 命格星君): The god of the destination of the mortals. He has a notebook which whatever written in will happen to the mortals later.

Fox Demon Xuan Li (Nickname: Furball by Song Yao): A King Fox Demon who takes a romantic interest in the Immortal Hengwen Qingjun, much to Immortal Song Yao Yuanjun dislike. He has goals to become an immortal just to be able to court Hengwen. He can often be found cuddling in Hengwen's lap. His home on the mountain he dubbed "Mount Xuanqing", he named after himself and Hengwen, housed many demons including a little mountain cat spirit.

Little Mountain Cat Spirit: A child who accompanies Xuan Li and lived on "Mount Xuanquing" in the King's cave. He is referred to only by Little Mountain Cat Spirit and does not seem to have another name.

Heavenly Palace (Chinese 天庭): In Chinese mythology, the majority of deities live in Heavenly Palace. It is like a Chinese version of Mount Olympus

The Execution Tower (Chinese 诛仙台): Deities and immortals who are found guilty will jump from the Execution Tower as a punishment. They will become mortal and even their souls will vanish.

Celestial Title (Chinese:虚号): A title given to an immortal or deity in the Heavenly Palace.
