= Mo Xiang Tong Xiu =

Chinese web novel author

- Born: Chinese: 袁依楣, romanized: Yuan Yimei; 1994 (age 31–32)
- Occupation: Writer of fantasy novels
- Writing career
- Pen name: Chinese: 墨香铜臭, romanized: Mo Xiang Tong Xiu
- Period: 2014–present
- Genre: Danmei
- Notable works: The Scum Villain's Self Saving System, Grandmaster of Demonic Cultivation, Heaven Official's Blessing

Yuan Yimei (Chinese: 袁依楣, born 1994), known by her pen name Mo Xiang Tong Xiu (Chinese: 墨香铜臭, pinyin: Mòxiāng Tóngxiù, MXTX) is a Chinese writer of fantasy novels in the danmei genre. She began publishing her work on the Chinese online literature platform Jinjiang.

== Pseudonym ==
According to the author, she came up with her pen name based on her mother's words. Mo Xiang Tong Xiu wanted to study literature in college, while her mother insisted that she study economics. Her mother said that she could “smell ink in one hand and the smell of money in the other.” 墨香 (Mo Xiang) means "the fragrance of ink (for writing)," and 铜臭 (Tong Xiu) is an expression meaning "the stench of money."

== Novels ==
- The Scum Villain’s Self-Saving System (Chinese: 人渣反派自救系统, pinyin: Rén Zhā Fǎn Pài Zì Jiù Xì Tǒng; also known as Scumbag System) was published in 2014. A donghua adaptation, announced for summer 2020, began airing in September 2020 on the WeTV channel under the title 穿书自救指南.
- Grandmaster of Demonic Cultivation (Chinese: 魔道祖师, pinyin: Mó Dào Zǔ Shī; also known as The Founder of Diabolism) was published in 2015. From 2018 to 2021, a three-season animated adaptation (donghua) was released. In 2019, a live-action television series based on the novel, The Untamed, starring Xiao Zhan and Wang Yibo, was released.
- Heaven Official’s Blessing (Chinese: 天官赐福, pinyin: Tiān Guān Cì Fú) was published in 2017. An animated adaptation began airing on October 31, 2020.

All three novels have also been adapted into manhua (Chinese comics) and Chinese-language audio dramas.

== Popularity ==
According to the All-Russian Book Ranking for the first half of 2022, Mo Xiang Tong Xiu's novel Heaven Official’s Blessing ranked among the top five bestsellers overall and in the fiction category.

According to Publishing Perspectives in 2022, the English translation of Heaven Official’s Blessing ranked among the ten most popular books. In 2023, Seven Seas Entertainment released the English translation of the manhua adaptation of Grandmaster of Demonic Cultivation, illustrated by Lodi Chengqiu. In the United Kingdom, in 2024, Mo Xiang Tong Xiu entered the top 25 best-selling authors, with total sales of her books for the year exceeding £997,000.

== Legal issues ==
In 2020, Mo Xiang Tong Xiu was given a three-year sentence for "illegal business operation," (Note: See Article 225 of the Criminal Law of the People's Republic of China) associated with the commercial promotion and sale of her work, in printed form, without a legitimate business register number — typically impossible for danmei authors to obtain. She was paroled in 2021.
