= 耽美 =

耽美, meaning boys' love, may refer to:

- Tanbi, the Japanese romanization.
- Danmei, the Chinese romanization.
