= Grandmaster of Demonic Cultivation =

2016 Chinese danmei novel by Mo Xiang Tong Xiu

- Chinese (Traditional) 1st print edition, volume 1 cover (2016)
- Author: Mo Xiang Tong Xiu; (墨香铜臭)
- Original title: 魔道祖师
- Language: Chinese
- Genre: Xianxia; Danmei; Mystery
- Publisher: Jinjiang Literature City
- Publication date: October 31, 2015 – March 1, 2016
- Publication place: China
- English publication date: December 14, 2021 – May 2, 2023; Seven Seas Entertainment
- Media type: Web Novel; Print (paperback & hardback); Audiobook; E-book

Chinese name
- Traditional Chinese: 魔道祖師
- Simplified Chinese: 魔道祖师
- Literal meaning: Demonic Path Ancestral Master
Transcriptions
Standard Mandarin
- Hanyu Pinyin: Módào Zǔshī
Yue: Cantonese
- Jyutping: mo^{1} dou^{6} zou^{2} si^{1}

Grandmaster of Demonic Cultivation (Chinese: 魔道祖师; pinyin: Módào Zǔshī; lit. 'Demonic Path Ancestral Master'), or MDZS, (Note: The whole Grandmaster of Demonic Cultivation franchise is more widely known and referred to by the international fandom by its original Chinese title Mo Dao Zu Shi (or MDZS).) is a danmei novel written by Chinese author Mo Xiang Tong Xiu, also known as MXTX. (Note: Mo Xiang Tong Xiu is the author's pen name. Also known as MXTX by international fans, though she specified that she prefers the name "Moxiang", hence the Chinese fandom mostly refers to her as Mx. Mo Xiang Tong Xiu is translated as 'Fragrance of Ink and Stink of Money'.) The story is set in a fictional xianxia world where humans known as "cultivators" specialize in spiritual, physical, and paranormal pursuits to achieve transcendence from mortality. It tells the tale of the eponymous Wei Wuxian, who diverged from conventional practices and invented an unorthodox path of cultivation.

Grandmaster of Demonic Cultivation follows several interwoven stories: two parallel tales recounting the events of Wei Wuxian's past and present lives, the investigation of the mystery behind a fierce dismembered entity presently terrorizing the cultivation world, and the development of the novel's central love story between Wei Wuxian and Lan Wangji, his former classmate and fellow cultivator.

Within the world of Grandmaster of Demonic Cultivation, issues concerning loyalty, classism, power and corruption, perception vs. reality, and ethics of violence frequently come about. The story is littered with true magical elements and supernatural beings, but the focus is on human characters in grounded conflicts.

The novel originated as a serialized fiction on the Chinese online platform Jinjiang Literature City from 2015 to 2016. As of December 2022, it has been officially translated into 11 different languages. The first two volumes of the ongoing official English translation reached The New York Times Best Seller list upon their release.

Among its official multimedia adaptations are a webcomic, an audio drama, an animated series and its spin-off, an audiobook, a live action web series, and an upcoming mobile game.

Grandmaster of Demonic Cultivation is noted for its international rise to popularity among niche areas of the internet, due in part to the romantic relationship between the two male leads, Lan Wangji and Wei Wuxian (Note: 'Wangxian' is the portmanteau of Lan Wangji's and Wei Wuxian's courtesy names. Also their official ship name and the canonical title of their love song.).

== Synopsis ==
Grandmaster of Demonic Cultivation is the story of the rise, death, and rebirth of Wei Wuxian (魏无羡), a man who made a name for himself as a cultivator with unconventional and forbidden methods to control the undead. Renowned as the founder of the 'Demonic Path', he is eventually killed during an attack by the Four Great Clans.

Thirteen years later, Wei Wuxian's spirit is forcefully summoned during a self-sacrificial ritual and he incarnates into the body of a man named Mo Xuanyu (莫玄羽). Wei Wuxian soon becomes embroiled in an investigation of a series of attacks by a feral dismembered corpse. With a new and unrecognizable face, he attempts to hide his return from the familiar faces he reunites with along his journey. But the stoic Lan Wangji (蓝忘机) of the Gusu Lan clan may suspect more than he lets on, and Wei Wuxian may have to face the truth of his resurrection in a world changed by his thirteen-year absence, along with his true feelings for Lan Wangji.

The Wangxian (忘羡) storyline tells of the deep connection between two men who see past surface distractions to recognize the similarities in the way they live their lives, the values they uphold, their sense of purpose, strength, and self-worth, and of the potential for profound happiness that may result from such.

== Story overview ==
=== Setting ===
Set in a fictional xianxia world reminiscent of ancient China, where human civilization consists of ordinary commoners and people who belong in the cultivation world, around which the story revolves. Cultivators train and work to accomplish superhuman feats in their attempt to reach transcendence from the mortal realm. Those with sufficient control over their spiritual energy undertake fantastical tasks such as liberating spirits, fighting malevolent ghosts and fierce corpses, exorcising haunted places or objects, and hunting down yaoguai and powerful lawless individuals. Their powers may be channeled through spiritual weapons, musical instruments, arrays, talismans, alchemy, and various other forms of cultivation tools.

The Golden Core (金丹; Jīn Dān) is a cultivated orb materialized from concentrated qi—fundamental energy that constitutes overall health—within the body of a living person and functions as storage for their spiritual power. Once formed, the golden core may escalate the user's cultivation level, resulting in faster skill development and increased longevity. It is a crucial aspect of being a cultivator, as there are certain feats, techniques, and defensive methods that can only be performed with the help of a well-developed golden core. Core formation and development can be achieved through years of diligent routine practices such as meditation and general martial arts training. A person's golden core is impossible to restore if destroyed or removed. Humans who do not possess one, or those who form it late in life, never develop a strong cultivation base and must rely on tools, techniques, or other 'paths' that do not require extensive use of their own spiritual energy.

The cultivation world is made up of numerous clans big and small. In the recent past, the most prominent of these were the Five Great Clans: Qishan Wen clan (岐山温氏; Qíshān Wēn shì), Yunmeng Jiang clan (云梦江氏; Yúnmèng Jiāng shì), Gusu Lan clan (姑苏蓝氏; Gūsū Lán shì), Lanling Jin clan (兰陵金氏; Lánlíng Jīn shì), and Qinghe Nie clan (清河聂氏; Qīnghé Niè shì). Each clan is situated at their respective region wherein disciples are trained in their specific clan-oriented 'cultivation path', which they use in practice to protect citizens under their jurisdiction from physical and paranormal threats, to gain glory for their clan, and to improve their personal cultivation level. These pursuits are called Night Hunts, due to mostly being carried out at night as it is the likeliest time of day that supernatural creatures come about.

Aside from their capacity to perform superhuman feats, most cultivators are presented as gentry scholars who train and may become proficient in the Chinese Six Arts, which places them at the top of the social hierarchy. Meanwhile, there are also those who exist as "rogue cultivators", ones who do not belong in any clan, sect, or organization due to them abandoning it, never being in one, being expelled, or their clan/sect being destroyed.

=== Plot summary ===
(The novel has a non-linear narrative structure with several intertwining plots. Below is a per storyline summary of events.)

The principal storyline begins thirteen years after the death of Wei Wuxian, the Yiling Patriarch (夷陵老祖; Yílíng Lǎozǔ), as he is summoned back to life by Mo Xuanyu through a self-sacrificial ritual. Wei Wuxian is reborn and awakens in the body of a lunatic, while fully cognizant of his own identity. He finds himself in Mo Village, where he is to fulfill the ritual's condition—to take revenge on Mo Xuanyu's behalf and exterminate the Mo family for abusing him—or else Wei Wuxian's own soul will be forever annihilated. He is freed from this condition when a vicious entity appears and goes on a murder spree that kills every one of Mo Xuanyu's abusers. While exploring the new world he finds himself in, he stumbles into people from his past and ends up accompanying Lan Wangji, his former classmate and a highly esteemed cultivator. The two become embroiled in the mystery of the evil entity, which left in its path a series of clues all seemingly leading back to Wei Wuxian's past. As they travel to unravel the case, Wei Wuxian re-lives previously encountered struggles and trials, and attempts to deal with the hatred of the cultivation world once more, along with the changes in his relationship with Lan Wangji.

While the main narrative covers the present timeline, it is intermingled with intermittent flashbacks recounting Wei Wuxian's previous life, from his glory days as a promising young cultivator until his death as the reviled Yiling Patriarch. As the 15-year-old senior disciple of the Yunmeng Jiang Clan, Wei Wuxian was a highly charismatic, willful, intelligent young man possessing a strong cultivation base and exceptional skills. He had a close relationship with his clan siblings, Jiang Yanli (江厌离) and Jiang Cheng (江澄). While in Cloud Recesses, he met the stern and aloof Lan Wangji, one of the Twin Jades of the Gusu Lan Clan. The two would maintain an ambiguous relationship throughout their years of acquaintance prior to Wei Wuxian's death.

At a crucial point in the story, Wei Wuxian invented the Ghost Path (鬼道; guǐ dào) (Note: The actual term in the novel for Wei Wuxian's cultivation is 'Ghost Path' (鬼道; guǐ dào), not 'Demonic Path' (魔道; mó dào) which was used to refer to him only once in the novel, when Wei Wuxian was reminiscing to the title given to him by the cultivation world. It is an established fact in this setting that ghosts and demons are different creatures. Wei Wuxian wields resentful energy from ghosts and corpses—already dead people—while imitators who come after him also use living people to manipulate as puppets and/or to consume their lives.) of cultivation which, unlike other paths, functions by harvesting and manipulating the resentful energy emitted by fierce ghosts and corpses. With this use of unorthodox methods to overthrow the tyrannical Qishan Wen Clan during the Sunshot Campaign, the cultivation world hailed Wei Wuxian as a war hero for his significant efforts and contributions that led to their victory. However, the fickle nature of society soon reared its head as the clans began to perceive him as a dangerous threat—someone willful and powerful enough to break out from the confines of society's rules, or someone who suffered from moral decay due to walking down the crooked path—while they coveted his powerful inventions all the same. Tensions escalated as Wei Wuxian kept up his objections to the Lanling Jin Clan's inhumane treatment of prisoners of war. Trapped between incompatible duties, he took it upon himself to rescue the Wen refugees and become their sole protector at the Burial Mounds in Yiling, willingly taking on people's anger and distrust with unshakeable conviction. He thus gained the title of Yiling Patriarch and was vilified as a traitor to the Jiangs and declared an "enemy of the cultivation world." Rumors and conspiracies arose, leading to more deaths and devastation, and with the fallout of morals and priorities colliding, it all came to a head at the First Siege of the Burial Mounds by the Four Great Clans, during which Wei Wuxian and the people he was protecting met their inglorious and bloody demise, and the world rejoiced.

The overarching story is a romantic arc that deals with the development of the novel's central love story between Wei Wuxian and Lan Wangji. Focalized through Wei Wuxian's limited point of view, it tells of their carefree, flirtatious days as teens—with the irreverent, mischievous Wei Wuxian juxtaposed against the somber, stickler-for-rules Lan Wangji; of the tentative bond they developed as young adults navigating the contentious issue of Wei Wuxian's cultivation path and the conflicts and struggles they're confronted with; and of their reunion thirteen years later when their dynamic swiftly turns into an emotionally intense mixture of extreme dedication, and overwhelming mutual romantic and sexual desire. It is eventually revealed that Lan Wangji had been secretly yearning for Wei Wuxian the whole time they'd known each other, and that his love and devotion never faltered in all the years the latter had been dead.

== Publication history ==
=== Overview ===
Chinese (Simplified) Edition cover art, illustrated by Changyang (2018)

The first chapter was released on the Chinese web novel platform Jinjiang Literature City (晋江文学城; Jìnjiāng Wénxuéchéng) on October 31, 2015, and serialization continued until the main story's completion on March 1, 2016. The next several months were spent revising the main chapters, while side stories (or "extra chapters") were released sporadically. Revision of the main story was posted on August 11, 2016, and the last four extra chapters were added between December 22, 2017, and January 1, 2018. Overall, the novel's online version had a total of 113 main chapters and seven extra chapters, most of which occur after the story's main events (also known as "post-canon").

The Taiwan first print edition was published by Pinsin Studio (平心工作室) in December 2016 in Traditional Chinese. It consists of four volumes containing the uncensored main story and four extra chapters, one of which is an exclusive extra ("From Dawn to Dusk") that was never published on the Jinjiang site. (Note: The four side stories (or "extra chapters") included in the 2016/2019 Taiwan edition (the version followed by most foreign editions, including English) are as follows: Family Banquet, Incense Burner Part 1 and 2 (combined into one chapter), Villainous Friends, From Dawn to Dusk.)

In December 2018, Sichuan Literature and Art Publishing House (四川文艺出版社) published the first volume, titled "无羁" (pinyin: Wújī; lit. 'Untamed') in Simplified Chinese. It contains chapters 1-42 and the extra chapter "Lotus Seed Pod", as well as a commemorative letter written by Mo Xiang Tong Xiu on October 31, 2018, the third anniversary of the web novel's original serialization. Subsequent volumes are stalled due to the novel being censured and eventually locked on the Jinjiang platform in January 2019.

In August 2019, Pinsin Studio released a four-volume Collector Edition, featuring new cover art for each volume illustrated by Qian Er Bai (千二百). The actual text and story contents are identical to the 2016 version. A special Side Stories Edition book was released in February 2020. It contains the last four extra chapters that were added on the Jinjiang site in 2017–2018. (Note: The remaining four chapters printed on the Special Side Stories Edition (usually the "fifth book" in most foreign editions): Intrusion, Metal Hook, Lotus Seed Pod, Dream Come True.)

=== Translations ===
(2019) Chinese (Traditional) Collector Edition, Volume 1 cover art, illustrated by Qian Er Bai (also featured in most foreign editions).

==== Fan translations ====
Before licenses had been secured for the official release of foreign editions, fan-made translations of the novel had been instrumental in spreading Grandmaster of Demonic Cultivation's fame internationally. Various groups had been formed by avid fans to provide valuable, free translations into several different languages, to be shared widely online. Each group had later willingly taken down these translation projects, as foreign publishers acquired the licenses for the novel's commercial release in their respective countries.

==== Official translations ====
(2021) English Edition, Volume 1 cover art, illustrated by Jin Fang.

As of July 2024, Grandmaster of Demonic Cultivation has been officially translated into Vietnamese, Thai, Korean, Burmese, Hungarian, Russian, Japanese, German, English, Brazilian Portuguese, French, Italian and Spanish.

==== Official novel releases ====
Below is a table guide featuring the novel's official translations and editions so far:

Language	Title	Year	Translator	Cover artist / illustrator(s)	Publisher	Media type
Chinese (Traditional)	魔道祖師; Mó Dào Zǔ Shī (1st Print) (Note: ISBN 978-986-5710-76-7 ISBN 978-986-5710-77-4 ISBN 978-986-5710-78-1 ISBN 978-986-5710-79-8)	2016			Pinsin Studio (平心出版), New Taipei	Print (paperback)
Chinese (Simplified)	"无羁"; Wújī (Note: ISBN 978-7-5411-5173-6)	2018		Changyang (长阳RIN)	Sichuan Literature and Art Publishing House (四川文艺出版社), Sichuan	Print (paperback), Audiobook
Vietnamese	Ma Đạo Tổ Sư (Note: ISBN 978-604-970-675-2 ISBN 978-604-970-676-9 ISBN 978-604-55-4564-5 ISBN 978-604-55-4565-2)	2019	Oải Hương Tím	Changyang	Cẩm Phong, Hanoi	Print (paperback & hardback)
Chinese (Traditional)	魔道祖師; Mó Dào Zǔ Shī (Collector Edition) (Note: ISBN 978-986-494-130-8 ISBN 978-986-494-131-5 ISBN 978-986-494-132-2 ISBN 978-986-494-133-9)	2019		Qian Er Bai (千二百)	Pinsin Studio, New Taipei	Print (paperback)
Chinese (Traditional)	魔道祖師; Mó Dào Zǔ Shī (Side Stories Edition) (Note: ISBN 978-986-494-172-8)	2020		Qian Er Bai	Pinsin Studio, New Taipei	Print (paperback)
Thai	ปรมาจารย์ลัทธิมาร; Prmācāry lạthṭhi mār (Note: ISBN 978-616-7477-48-0 ISBN 978-616-7477-54-1 ISBN 978-616-7477-58-9 ISBN 978-616-7477-64-0 ISBN 978-616-7477-70-1 ISBN 978-616-7477-71-8)	2019-2020	Alice (อลิส)	Changyang	Bakery Book, Bangkok	Print (paperback)
Korean	마도조사; Ma Do Jo Sa (Note: ISBN 979-11-278-5144-6 ISBN 979-11-278-5212-2 ISBN 979-11-278-5306-8 ISBN 979-11-278-5368-6)	2019-2020	Lee Hyun-ah (이현아)	Qian Er Bai	B-Lab, Seoul	Print (paperback), E-book
Burmese	ေမွာ္နက္လမ္းစဥ္ အ႐ွင္သခင္ (1st Print) (Note: ISBN 978-1-95236-901-8 ISBN 978-1-95236-902-5 ISBN 978-1-95236-903-2)	2020	Zheng Qin Yu (郑沁瑜)	Qian Er Bai	Thousands Autumn, Naypyidaw	Print (paperback)
Hungarian	A démoni kultiváció nagymestere (Note: ISBN 978-615-6022-77-6 ISBN 978-615-6022-89-9 ISBN 978-615-6022-90-5 ISBN 978-615-6022-92-9 ISBN 978-615-6186-29-4)	2020-2021	Kiss Marcell	Qian Er Bai	Művelt Nép Könyvkiadó, Budapest	Print (paperback)
Russian	Магистр дьявольского культа Magistr d'yavol'skogo kul'ta (Note: ISBN 978-5-907340-00-8 ISBN 978-5-907340-01-5 ISBN 978-5-907340-02-2 ISBN 978-5-907340-03-9)	2020	M.Kulishova (М Кулишова)	Qian Er Bai, Marina Privalova	Istari Comics, Moscow	Print (hardback)
Korean	마도조사; Ma Do Jo Sa (Re-cover version) (Note: ISBN 979-11-278-5806-3 ISBN 979-11-278-5807-0 ISBN 979-11-278-5808-7 ISBN 979-11-278-5809-4)	2021	Lee Hyun-ah (이현아)	Raii	B-Lab, Seoul	Print (paperback), E-book
Japanese	魔道祖師; Ma Dō So Shi (Note: ISBN 978-4-86657-412-7 ISBN 978-4-86657-413-4 ISBN 978-4-86657-414-1 ISBN 978-4-86657-415-8)	2021	Zheng Yingxin (鄭穎馨)	Qian Er Bai	Daria Series Uni, Tokyo	Print (paperback), E-book
German	The Grandmaster of Demonic Cultivation (Note: ISBN 978-3-8420-7178-0 ISBN 978-3-8420-7179-7 ISBN 978-3-8420-7180-3 ISBN 978-3-8420-7181-0 ISBN 978-3-8420-8472-8)	2021-2023	Nina Le	Qian Er Bai	TokyoPop, Hamburg	Print (paperback & hardback), E-book
English	Grandmaster of Demonic Cultivation (Note: ISBN 978-1-64827-919-5 ISBN 978-1-64827-920-1 ISBN 978-1-63858-301-1 ISBN 978-1-63858-156-7 ISBN 978-1-63858-549-7)	2021-2023	Suika & Lianyin, Pengie (Editor)	Jin Fang, Marina Privalova, moo, wenwen, minatu, idledee, ZeldaCW	Seven Seas Entertainment, Los Angeles	Print (paperback), E-book
Portuguese (BRA)	O Fundador da Cultivação Demoníaca (Note: ISBN 978-6-58679-962-0 ISBN 978-8-58362-331-1)	2022-ongoing	Sisi Qian	Qian Er Bai	NewPop, São Paulo	Print (paperback)
French	Le Grand Maître de la Cultivation Démoniaque (Note: ISBN 979-1038169944 ISBN 979-1038137486)	2022-2025	Audrey Simon	Qian Er Bai, Natalia Sorokina, Marina Privalova, Akakumoeteru, Asis, Tiphs, Usako, Wusuo	MXM Bookmark, Paris	Print (paperback & hardback), E-book
Burmese	ေမွာ္နက္လမ္းစဥ္ အ႐ွင္သခင္ (2nd print)	TBA	Zheng Qin Yu (郑沁瑜)	Wusuo Yu (乌索Yu)	Thousands Autumn, Naypyidaw	Print (hardback)
Italian	Grandmaster of Demonic Cultivation	TBA	TBA	Jin Fang	OscarVault, Segrate	Print (paperback)
Spanish	El Gran Maestro de la Cultivación Demoníaca	2024-ongoing	Javier Altayó	Qian Er Bai, Marina Privalova	Norma Editorial, Barcelona	Print (hardback & paperback)
Estonian	Deemonliku Tee Suurmeister	2025 - ongoing	Helina Ravasoo	Liis Roden	Kirjastus Fantaasia, Tartu	Print (paperback), E-book

== Adaptations ==
=== Web comic ===
A web comic (manhua) adaptation of the same name (魔道祖师; Mó Dào Zǔ Shī; official English title: The Master of Diabolism), was officially distributed online by kuaikanmanhua (快看漫画) from December 8, 2017, until October 26, 2022, finishing with 259 chapters. It was co-created by Luo Di Cheng Qiu (落地成球) and Kuangfeng Chui Kudang (狂风吹裤裆). The cover art for Volume 1 was illustrated by HAloggz.

In 2019, the manhua won the silver award for Most Popular Web Comic Adaptation at the 16th China Animation Golden Dragon Award, and the Best Manhua award at the China Golden Rooster and Hundred Flowers Film Festival (1st Network Drama Awards).

The first volume of the Mainland Simplified physical print version, titled Memoirs of the Red Flute and the Heavenly Guqin (赤笛云琴记; Chì Dí Yún Qín Jì) was published by China Radio and Television Press (中国广播影视出版社) in August 2020.

Taiwan's Pinsin Studio handles the currently ongoing publication of the Traditional uncensored print version, using its original title, starting with the release of Volume 1 in September 2021.

An official online English translation was available at WeComics website from October 18, 2019, to September 14, 2021. It ran up to chapter 197 before being discontinued. On November 19, 2021, all the chapters were removed due to WeComics finalizing its migration as Webnovel, which does not hold licenses for several manhua titles, including The Master of Diabolism. (Note: The WeComics website is now terminated.) Seven Seas Entertainment has since acquired the rights to the official English physical print version, with Volume 1 released in March 2023.

The manhua's official online Korean translation was released from March 18, 2020, up to December 21, 2022. All the chapters are available on Lezhin Comics official website.

Below is a table guide featuring the manhua's officially published printed editions so far:

Language	Title	Year	Publisher	Version
Chinese (Simplified)	赤笛云琴记; Chì Dí Yún Qín Jì; Memoirs of the Red Flute and the Heavenly Guqin	August 2020 - ongoing	China Radio and Television Press, Beijing	Paperback, Censored
Chinese (Traditional)	魔道祖師; Mó Dào Zǔ Shī	September 2021 - ongoing	Pinsin Studio (平心出版), New Taipei	Paperback, Uncensored
Russian	Основатель темного пути Osnovatel Tjomnogo Puti; Founder of the Dark Path	August 2022 - ongoing	Kom Federation, Moscow	Hardback, Uncensored
German	The Grandmaster of Demonic Cultivation	November 2022 - ongoing	TokyoPop, Hamburg	Hardback & paperback, Uncensored
Spanish	Grandmaster of Demonic Cultivation	December 2022 - ongoing	Norma Editorial, Barcelona	Paperback, Uncensored
English	Grandmaster of Demonic Cultivation	March 2023 - March 2026	Seven Seas Entertainment, Los Angeles	Paperback, Uncensored
Vietnamese	Ma Đạo Tổ Sư	June 2023 - ongoing	Daisy.Comics, Hanoi	Paperback, Uncensored
Brazilian Portuguese	Mo Dao Zu Shi: O Fundador da Cultivação Demoníaca; Mo Dao Zu Shi: The Founder of Demonic Cultivation	January 2024 - ongoing	NewPop, São Paulo	Paperback, Uncensored
European Portuguese	Grão-mestre do Demonismo; Grandmaster of Demonism	February 2024 - ongoing	Editorial Presença, Lisbon	Paperback, Uncensored
French	Le Grand Maître de la Cultivation Démoniaque (Mo Dao Zu Shi)	June 2024 - ongoing	Komogi, Lyon	Paperback, Uncensored

=== Audio drama ===
An official audio drama adaptation was produced by Polar Penguin Studios (北斗企鹅工作室 制作) in collaboration with Sound Studio (寻声工作室), supervised by the novel's author, Mo Xiang Tong Xiu. It encompasses three seasons and is broadcast on the Chinese audio streaming app MaoEr FM (猫耳FM). It features voice actors Lu Zhixing (路知行) as Wei Wuxian and Wei Chao (魏超) as Lan Wangji.

The first season aired from June 8 to August 24, 2018, with a total of 12 episodes along with some extras. The second season aired from October 5, 2018, to April 5, 2019, with a total of 16 episodes along with some extras. The theme song for Season 1 up to mid Season 2 is "何以歌" (Héyǐ gē, lit. 'What to Sing'), performed by Aki (阿杰). Starting from Season 2 Episode 11, the theme song changed to "忘羡" (Wàngxiàn, lit. 'Forgetting Envies'). This is a duet between Lan Wangji and Wei Wuxian, and is performed by Wu En (吾恩) and Yu Xia (余夏). The third season aired from June 17 to December 29, 2019, with a total of 17 episodes along with some extras. The theme song for Season 3 is "人间纵我" (Rénjiān zòng wǒ, lit. 'Untamed as I am'), and is performed by Wu En and Yu Xia.

The audio drama features unique cover art for each episode, officially illustrated by various artists within the Mo Dao Zu Shi fandom. These include Higga, HAloggz, A-Xin (阿昕), Qian Er Bai (千二百), Changyang (长阳RIN), SpoonKid, Ma Que Su (麻雀酥), Qingshui Bai Taozi (清水白桃子), Zukiyn (坠), and mewkoala.

The audio drama was a critical and financial success, praised for its storyline, faithfulness to the source material, production value, and the voice actors' performances. It amassed hundreds of million playbacks across all three seasons, with each episode placing on top of the weekly rankings during their original run. The series has garnered over 600 million playbacks as of January 2023. All three seasons still remain as the website's top 3 most listened to series in the overall ranking.

Mo Dao Zu Shi's audio drama OST boxset was released in 2020. The deluxe edition came with various merchandise, including: two official soundtrack CDs, an artbook featuring all the illustrated artworks produced for the show, a lyrics book, an autograph booklet with the staff members' personalized notes and signatures, a music box playing the audio drama version of the "Wangxian" theme song, postcards, badges, and a USB flash drive containing video and audio recordings of behind-the-scenes moments and voice performers' messages for fans. (Note: Neither regular nor deluxe edition boxset contains the actual episodes of the Chinese audio drama. They are officially available solely online on Maoer FM app/missevan website.)

==== Japanese audio drama version ====
The audio drama's massive success and popularity led to it being brought over to Japan for a localized adaptation, produced by Brave Hearts and in close collaboration with the original Chinese audio drama team. The Ma Dō So Shi Japanese Radio Drama (魔道祖師日本語版ラジオドラマ) started airing on January 24, 2020, and is simultaneously broadcast on the Japanese audio streaming app MiMi FM and the Chinese audio streaming app MaoEr FM every Friday at 6pm Japan Standard Time (GMT +09:00). The show has broadcast up to the end of Season 2 as of December 2022.

The Japanese audio drama stars Tatsuhisa Suzuki as Wei Wuxian (魏無羨, Gi Musen) and Satoshi Hino as Lan Wangji (藍忘機, Ran Bouki).

Physical CD boxsets get released every half season, containing the Japanese audio drama episodes and various special merchandise.

=== Audiobook ===
An official Mo Dao Zu Shi audiobook was released by Ximalaya FM (喜马拉雅FM) from July to November 2019, consisting of 175 episodes with a total listening length of 47 hours and 16 minutes. Performance artist Zhang Zhen (张震), who also voices the character Jiang Fengmian in the Chinese audio drama, was specially invited to serve as the narrator.

=== Animation ===
An animated (donghua) adaptation of the same name (魔道祖师; Mó Dào Zǔ Shī; official English title: The Founder of Diabolism), was produced by Tencent Penguin Pictures and B.C May Pictures, in collaboration with 729 Voice Studio. It premiered in China on Tencent Video on July 9, 2018, and concluded on October 16, 2021, with 35 episodes aired over three seasons. It features Zhang Jie as Wei Wuxian and Bian Jiang (边江) as Lan Wangji.

The donghua version of the Wangxian song, titled "羡云" (Xiànyún, lit. 'Envying Clouds'), was originally sung by HITA and released in 2019. A duet version sung by Zhang Jie and Bian Jiang was released after the final episode. In the actual show, Lan Wangji reveals that the song's title is "忘羡" (Wàngxiàn, lit. 'Forgetting Envies'), in accordance with novel canon.

A chibi spin-off series, titled The Founder of Diabolism Q, aired from July 31, 2020, to January 29, 2021, for 30 episodes. Most episodes are a light-hearted take on the events of the series, serving as re-imaginings or as gap fillers. Each episode runs for approximately 5 minutes.

=== Web series ===
The novel was adapted as a live action web series, The Untamed (陈情令; Chén Qíng Lìng), produced by Tencent Penguin Pictures and New Style Media. It stars Xiao Zhan as Wei Wuxian and Wang Yibo as Lan Wangji. It aired in China on Tencent Video from June 27 to August 20, 2019, for 50 episodes; with two episodes every Thursday and Friday, before being changed to every Monday and Wednesday (GMT +08:00) starting July 1. The theme song, sung by Xiao Zhan and Wang Yibo, was originally titled "忘羡" (Wàngxiàn, lit. 'Forgetting Envies') and later renamed to "无羁" (Wújī, lit. 'Without Restraint').

=== Mobile game ===
An upcoming Chinese mobile game, titled The Untamed, is slated for global release in 2022 and it will be available on iOS and Android. The news was announced via Weibo on October 30, 2019. The game will be a card and visual novel style. As of 2023, there had been no news of release.

=== Stage production ===
Madō Soshi (魔道祖師) was a Japanese stage production adaptation that ran from March 22 to March 30, 2025 in Tokyo, Japan, and April 4 to April 6, 2025 in Kyoto, Japan. The April 6 performance was also live streamed via ZAIKO.

== Reception ==
=== General ===
Grandmaster of Demonic Cultivation has attracted a readership on Jinjiang Literature City and in print, and the series as a whole with its various adaptations has drawn an international fan base.

Within 24 hours of the August 4, 2021, announcement of her three novels' English release, pre-order sales for Grandmaster of Demonic Cultivation were at #8 ranking on Amazon. On August 5, 2021, it was ranked #1 out of all Barnes & Noble Bestsellers. (Note: Barnes & Noble is the biggest physical bookstore chain in America.) For the next few days, it was Frontpage Trending along with MXTX's other two novels on Amazon, Barnes & Noble, and Fullybooked websites.

=== Awards and recognitions ===
In February 2020, Mo Dao Zu Shi (마도조사; Ma Do Jo Sa) was awarded the 'Rising Star Award' (뉴 스타상) by Ridibooks, the largest e-book service platform in South Korea. Ma Do Jo Sa was the only foreign work among the thirty novels to receive the award.

Upon the first volume's English release in December 2021, Grandmaster of Demonic Cultivation debuted at #9 on The New York Times Best Seller list for Paperback Trade Fiction. The second volume was released on May 17, 2022, and was announced to have hit the #8 ranking on May 25, 2022, dated for the June 5 print of The New York Times Book Review.

In December 2021, Mo Dao Zu Shi (魔道祖師, Ma Dō So Shi) was awarded 1st place in the Best Novel category by Kono BL Ga Yabai!, a BL guidebook released annually by NextFComics. On the same month, it ranked #5 in the Novel Category during ComiComi of the Year 2021, held by ComiComi Studio, an online BL shop. The awards were given to the top 5 most supported works by customers. In April 2022, it was ranked 2nd place as Best Novel during the 13th BL Award 2022, held by the Japanese BL information site "Chill Chill".

=== Fandom ===
Throughout much of its history, the size of Grandmaster of Demonic Cultivation's fan community was in the millions. Its success among the audience was built on the solid foundation of its plot and worldbuilding, the moral standards and messages it tries to promote, its themes, the complexities of its characters, and the appeal of its featured main couple 'Wangxian', based on their personality traits, relationship history, motifs surrounding their love story, and their romantic and sexual dynamics.

Mo Dao Zu Shi's fan community within China is tremendous. Fans create discourse, cosplay photoshoots, fanarts, and fanfictions—one of which gained enormous popularity and became the basis for the widespread fanon about Lan Wangji's "Thirteen Years of Inquiry", also later implied to be absorbed by some adaptations like the donghua and live action drama.

For the year 2020, the romantic relationship between Lan Wangji and Wei Wuxian was ranked #1 on fanfiction site Archive of Our Own's Top 100 list of pairings with the most newly written works.

=== Legacy ===
"Although its popularity exists largely outside of English-language pop culture, MDZS (as it is called) is widely popular on a scale that most stories will never approach". - Kali Wallace, (excerpt from a review article on tor.com)

Though Mo Dao Zu Shi was not the first of its kind, the novel and its adaptations have been credited as significant influential factors in the emergence of the danmei genre in international fandom spaces. The story's popularity and fan demand led to foreign publishers securing the license rights to translate and publish the novel, even in countries that have never been exposed to danmei stories. Mo Dao Zu Shi has become a "gateway", its success leading the way for official foreign publications of more danmei novels.

The novel's animated adaptation The Founder of Diabolism, with its strong audience ratings and critical acclaim, had been considerably influential in the increased international exposure to the Chinese animation industry. Foreign viewers who were fans of Japanese anime discovered The Founder of Diabolism donghua upon its 2018 release and hailed it for its storyline and animation quality, and word-of-mouth eventually spread on MyAnimeList, Twitter, and Tumblr.
