= Jiang Guangtao =

Chinese voice actor

- 姜广涛
- Born: May 6, 1976 (age 49); Changchun, China
- Occupations: Voice actor; voice director
- Years active: 1995-present

Jiang Guangtao (simplified Chinese: 姜广涛; traditional Chinese: 姜廣濤; pinyin: Jiāng Guǎngtāo) is a Chinese voice actor and voice director of Mainland China, dubbing and directing foreign content in the Mandarin Chinese format. Most of the roles that Jiang dubs for foreign films are considered protagonist or secondary roles.

== Voice roles ==
=== Animated series ===
- Purple River (2021) – Zichuan Xiu
- The Island of Siliang (2021) – Xiao Ji
- Drowning Sorrows in Raging Fire (2021) – Sheng Lingyuan
- Heaven Official's Blessing (2020) – Xie Lian

=== Animated films ===
- Kuiba 3 (2014)

=== Video games ===
- Chinese Paladin 5 – Jiang Yun Fun
- Chinese Paladin 5 Prequel – Xia Hou Jin Xvan
- For All Time/Lovebrush Chronicles – Ye Xuan/Cael Anselm/Emerald (Former voice actor)
- Tears of Themis – Vyn Richter
- 花亦山心之月 – Yu Ze

=== Dubbing (live action films) ===
- Scent of a Woman – Charlie Simms (Chris O'Donnell) (2003 CCTV Dub)
- The Chronicles of Narnia: Prince Caspian – Prince Caspian (Ben Barnes)
- The Chronicles of Narnia: The Voyage of the Dawn Treader – King Caspian (Ben Barnes)
- The Children of Huang Shi – George Hogg (Jonathan Rhys Meyers)
- The Lord of the Rings: The Fellowship of the Ring – Frodo Baggins (Elijah Wood)
- The Lord of the Rings: The Two Towers – Frodo Baggins (Elijah Wood)
- The Lord of the Rings: The Return of the King – Frodo Baggins (Elijah Wood)
- Eternal Sunshine of the Spotless Mind – Patrick (Elijah Wood)
- Master and Commander: The Far Side of the World – First Lieutenant / Acting Captain Thomas Pullings (James D'Arcy)
- Transformers – Sam Witwicky (Shia LaBeouf)
- Transformers: Revenge of the Fallen – Sam Witwicky (Shia LaBeouf)
- Transformers: Dark of the Moon – Sam Witwicky (Shia LaBeouf)
- Transformers: Age of Extinction – Shane Dyson (Jack Reynor)
- Dragonball Evolution – Goku (Justin Chatwin)
- 2012 – Jackson Curtis (John Cusack)
- Percy Jackson & the Olympians: The Lightning Thief – Percy Jackson (Logan Lerman)
- The Incredible Hulk – Bruce Banner/Hulk (Edward Norton)
- Titanic – Jack Dawson (Leonardo DiCaprio)
- April Snow – In-soo (Bae Yong-joon)
- Superman Returns – Jimmy Olsen (Sam Huntington)
- Stardust – Tristan Thorn (Charlie Cox)
- Charlie and the Chocolate Factory – Willy Wonka (Johnny Depp) (2008 CCTV Dub)
- Amélie – Nino Quincampoix (Mathieu Kassovitz)
- High School Musical – Troy Bolton (Zac Efron)
- High School Musical 2 – Troy Bolton (Zac Efron)
- High School Musical 3: Senior Year – Troy Bolton (Zac Efron)
- Bedtime Stories – Skeeter Bronson (Adam Sandler)
