= Heaven Official's Blessing =

2017 novel by Mo Xiang Tong Xiu

- 天官赐福
- Genre: Xianxia
- Based on: Tian Guan Ci Fu by Mo Xiang Tong Xiu
- Written by: Season 1: Chunri Youling (春日幽鈴); Season 2: Heibai Hujiao (黒白胡椒)
- Directed by: Season 1: Li Haoling (李豪凌); Season 2: Hu Ya (虎牙)
- Music by: Yang Bingyin (楊秉音)
- Country of origin: China
- Original language: Mandarin Chinese
- No. of seasons: 2
- No. of episodes: 24

Production
- Executive producers: Zhang Shengyan (张圣晏); Luo Yanyan (骆艳艳)
- Producers: Liu Qi (刘綦); Pan Linlin (潘琳琳); Wang Rong (王蓉)
- Animators: Season 1: Haoliners Animation League; Season 2: Red Dog Culture House
- Production company: Bilibili

Original release
- Network: Bilibili (seasons 1 and 2); Funimation (season 1); Crunchyroll (season 2)
- Release: October 31, 2020 – January 17, 2024

Heaven Official's Blessing
- Chinese: 天官賜福
Transcriptions
Standard Mandarin
- Hanyu Pinyin: Tiān Guān Cì Fú
- IPA: [tʰjɛ́n kwán tsʰɹ̩̂ fǔ]

Heaven Official's Blessing (Chinese: 天官赐福; pinyin: Tiān Guān Cì Fú) is a Chinese novel written by Mo Xiang Tong Xiu (墨香铜臭). The serialization started on Jinjiang Literature City, a popular Chinese website for publishing and serializing web fiction, on June 16, 2017, and was completed on February 25, 2018. It consists of 244 chapters and eight additional short stories. A manhua adaptation, illustrated by STARember and published by Bilibili, was released on October 19, 2019. A donghua adaptation was released on Bilibili and Funimation on October 31, 2020. An audio drama began releasing on July 15, 2022, published by Xun Sheng Studio.

== Synopsis ==
Eight hundred years ago, Xie Lian was the Crown Prince of the Kingdom of Xianle. He was loved by his citizens and was considered the darling of the heavens. He ascended to the heavens at 17 years old and was lauded as a flower-crowned martial god; however, due to unfortunate circumstances, is banished back to the mortal realm. Years later, experiences a brief second ascension, and is quickly banished a second time.

Now, eight hundred years later, Xie Lian ascends to the heavens a third time, this time without any followers or offerings. While returning from collecting scraps to build his first new shrine, he meets a mysterious young man, who is later revealed to be Hua Cheng, one of four ghost kings, or "calamities," long feared across the three realms. Heaven Official's Blessing is the story of how Xie Lian re-establishes himself as a god, comes to terms with long-buried past transgressions, and uncovers how intertwined his and Hua Cheng's fates and history really are.

== Plot ==
"啊那个收破烂的天界公务员，跟鬼界第一大佬有一腿！"
(English: "Ah! That Scrap-Collecting Heavenly Official is having an affair with the King of the Ghost Realm!")

— Mo Xiang Tong Xiu, Heaven Official's Blessing epigraph

=== Novel ===
Told through a nonlinear narrative spanning more than eight centuries, Heaven Official's Blessing follows Xie Lian, the former crown prince of the fictional Kingdom of Xianle, and his relationship with Hua Cheng, a powerful ghost king whose life has been intertwined with his for centuries. The novel combines elements of xianxia fantasy, Chinese mythology, and romance, alternating between Xie Lian's present-day adventures and events from his past.

Born into Xianle's royal family, Xie Lian dedicates himself to Taoist cultivation and martial training, ascending to godhood at seventeen. Revered by his people, he believes that his divine powers should be used to alleviate human suffering. When his kingdom is threatened by drought, civil unrest, and war, he defies the heavenly prohibition against interfering in mortal affairs and attempts to save his people. However, his intervention fails to prevent Xianle's destruction, which is further accelerated by the outbreak of a deadly epidemic known as the human face disease. Blamed for the kingdom's downfall, Xie Lian loses his worshippers, and his temples and statues are destroyed. He is subsequently banished from heaven and endures centuries of poverty, humiliation, and isolation.

During his youth, Xie Lian unknowingly saves the life of a young boy named Hong Hong-er, who develops an enduring devotion to him. Despite witnessing Xie Lian's fall from grace, the boy never abandons his faith in the former prince. After his death, he persists as a spirit and eventually becomes Hua Cheng, also known as Crimson Rain Sought Flower (血雨探花), one of the Four Great Calamities. Over the following centuries, Hua Cheng's admiration develops into profound romantic love, motivating his determination to become powerful enough to protect Xie Lian.

Eight hundred years after his first ascension, Xie Lian ascends to heaven for a third time. Having spent centuries wandering the mortal realm as a scrap collector, he is now widely regarded by the other heavenly officials as a god of misfortune. To repay the debts incurred by his latest ascension, he begins investigating supernatural disturbances. His first assignment takes him to Mount Yujun, where several brides have mysteriously disappeared during their wedding processions. During the investigation, he encounters a mysterious red-robed figure who guides him through a dangerous supernatural formation. He later discovers that the stranger was Hua Cheng, a feared ghost king whom the heavenly officials warn him to avoid.

Shortly afterward, Xie Lian meets a seemingly ordinary young man who introduces himself as San Lang. The two quickly establish a friendship, and San Lang accompanies Xie Lian to Puqi Village, where the latter establishes a modest shrine. Although Xie Lian suspects that San Lang is Hua Cheng in disguise, he remains unconcerned by his identity. Unlike the heavenly officials, who largely treat Xie Lian with contempt, Hua Cheng consistently demonstrates affection, loyalty, and respect toward him. Their companionship deepens as they spend time together and undertake increasingly dangerous investigations.

Their adventures take them to the ruined kingdom of Banyue, where Xie Lian confronts individuals connected to his past, and later to Ghost City, a supernatural settlement ruled by Hua Cheng. There, Xie Lian learns more about the ghost king's immense power and influence. As their relationship develops, Hua Cheng's protectiveness and unwavering devotion become increasingly apparent, while Xie Lian begins to recognize his own growing attachment to him. Although initially unaware of the full extent of Hua Cheng's feelings, Xie Lian gradually comes to trust him more deeply than almost anyone else.

Meanwhile, Xie Lian's investigations uncover hidden conflicts and corruption within the heavenly realm. One prominent storyline concerns Shi Qingxuan, the Wind Master, and his elder brother Shi Wudu, the Water Master, whose interference with mortal destinies has devastating consequences. Their actions ultimately bring them into conflict with He Xuan, a powerful ghost king known as Black Water Sinking Ships. These events expose the moral ambiguity of the heavenly officials and challenge the assumption that divine status necessarily reflects virtue.

Through a series of flashbacks, the novel gradually reveals the circumstances of Xie Lian's previous banishments, his relationships with his former attendants Feng Xin and Mu Qing, and his persecution by the mysterious entity White No-Face. These revelations also establish Hua Cheng's presence throughout significant moments of Xie Lian's past, including his appearances as a child, a young soldier, and later a spirit. His devotion persists through Xie Lian's repeated misfortunes, contrasting with the abandonment he experiences from his former worshippers.

The central romance develops alongside these revelations. Hua Cheng's centuries of seemingly unrequited love gradually becomes mutual as Xie Lian recognizes the depth of his own feelings. Their relationship is expressed through emotional intimacy, physical affection, and several kisses, some of which initially occur while transferring spiritual energy. During their journey to Mount Tonglu, Xie Lian discovers thousands of statues depicting himself within a network of caves, revealing the extent of Hua Cheng's devotion. Eventually, Xie Lian openly reciprocates Hua Cheng's romantic feelings, and the two become lovers.

The final conflict centers on the reappearance of White No-Face and the revelation that he is connected to Jun Wu, the Heavenly Emperor whom Xie Lian has long trusted. Jun Wu is revealed to be the former crown prince of the ancient kingdom of Wuyong, whose failed attempts to save his people resulted in catastrophe. Having experienced suffering similar to Xie Lian's, Jun Wu sought to force the younger god into abandoning his faith in humanity. With Hua Cheng's support, Xie Lian confronts Jun Wu and rejects his belief that suffering must inevitably lead to cruelty and despair.

During their final confrontation, Hua Cheng expends much of his spiritual power to protect Xie Lian and help him break the cursed shackles that have restricted his abilities. Together, they overcome Jun Wu, ending the persecution that has shaped Xie Lian's existence for centuries. However, Hua Cheng's expenditure of power causes his physical form to dissipate. Before disappearing, he promises Xie Lian that he will return.

Following Hua Cheng's disappearance, Xie Lian waits faithfully for him, mirroring the centuries Hua Cheng spent searching for and protecting him. Approximately a year later, Hua Cheng returns, and the two are reunited. The novel concludes with Xie Lian and Hua Cheng together as romantic partners, their relationship having evolved from centuries of one-sided devotion into a mutually acknowledged love.

=== Translation ===
The novels were officially translated into English by Seven Seas Entertainment, with eight volumes in total. The translation is accompanied by illustrations from ZeldaCW, and the first volume was released on December 14, 2021. The final volume of the series was released on November 28, 2023, alongside two special editions.

The seventh volume of the translation reached #5 on The New York Times Best Seller list for the week of October 1, 2023, which was the highest ranking of any novel written by Mo Xiang Tong Xiu up to that point.

== Origin ==
Regarding her conception of the story, Mo Xiang Tong Xiu has said:

...In a broken and defeated temple with a soon-to-be forgotten god and a young devout follower was the first image that floated into my mind for this novel, and was also what gave me the impulse to write it. I'm the kind that would write up an entire book just for a scene.

— Heaven Official's Blessing Book 2, Author's Notes

The term "Heaven Official's Blessing" traditionally referred to the Shangyuan Festival of the Daoism. It was said that on the date of the Shangyuan Festival, the xian Tianguan visits the mortal realm to bring blessings. The phrase is said as a blessing and written on fai chun for the festival.

== Adaptations ==
=== Donghua ===
The donghua was released on Bilibili and Funimation in October 2020. The production of a second season was confirmed by Bilibili in January 2021. A special episode was released on February 16, 2021. Netflix also began streaming the series (including the special episode) as of April 9, 2021. A trailer for the upcoming second season was released on November 24, 2021. The second season started airing from October 26, 2023.

The English dub premiered on November 12, 2021, on Funimation.

==== Season 1 (2020–2021) ====
No.	Title (Note: All English titles are taken from Funimation.)	Original release date
1	"The Bride Prince"; Transliteration: "Tàizǐ xīnniáng" (Chinese: 太子新娘)	October 31, 2020
After incurring a debt of 8.88 million merit credits, Xie Lian is tasked with heading to the mortal realm to deal with a ghost bridegroom kidnapping brides on Mount Yujun. Xie Lian sets a trap to catch the bridegroom in the act with the help of two middle heaven junior officials, Fu Yao and Nan Feng.
2	"Mountain-Locked Ming Guang"; Transliteration: "Shān suǒ míngguāng" (Chinese: 山锁明光)	October 31, 2020
Xie Lian eventually comes upon a temple of Ming Guang on Mount Yujun. He finds the missing brides inside and comes to a startling conclusion.
3	"Confidant's Past Grudge"; Transliteration: "Jiù hèn hóngyán" (Chinese: 旧恨红颜)	November 7, 2020
The ghost behind all the kidnappings is revealed and Xie Lian is caught between catching the perpetrator and keeping the villagers safe. However, capturing the ghost only brings up more questions than answers as a disease is found which should have died out centuries ago.
4	"Ghost King Hua Cheng"; Transliteration: "Guǐ wáng huāchéng" (Chinese: 鬼王花城)	November 14, 2020
Xie Lian goes to the other gods to ask about all he saw on Mount Yujun. We learn of 4 ghost kings, in particular Hua Cheng who caused the demise of thirty-three heavenly officials. Xie Lian clears his debt and heads once more to the mortal realm with plans to open a temple and gain followers.
5	"Daily Life at Puqi Temple"; Transliteration: "Pú qí jìshì" (Chinese: 菩荠记事)	November 21, 2020
Xie Lian meets a young man while travelling on ox-pulled cart. The two have a long discussion about gods and ghosts, before being interrupted by ghosts along the forest path. While Xie Lian attempts to sneak by, the ghosts confront him only to abruptly back down in fear. Once back at his temple, Xie Lian offers the young man a place to stay in his shrine.
6	"Lost In Banyue"; Transliteration: "Bànyuè mí zōng" (Chinese: 半月迷踪)	November 28, 2020
A puppet disguised as a disease-ridden man appears at the shrine, panicked. The men realize he was not human and subdue him. After the former State Preceptor of Banyue was brought up, the two men along with Fu Yao and Nan Feng travel to Banyue. During their journey, they spotted 2 running women and got engulfed in a heavy sandstorm.
7	"Scorpion-Tailed Snake Shadow"; Transliteration: "Xiē wěi shé yǐng" (Chinese: 蝎尾蛇影)	December 5, 2020
The group survives the sandstorm and enters a cave with some merchants and artifacts from Banyue. Among the artifacts is a tombstone with details the life of a General from the army which opposed Banyue. After a nearly-lethal run in with a scorpion-tailed snake leaving a merchant and Xie Lian injured, the group and the merchant's guide head to Banyue for an herbal antidote. Upon reaching Banyue, they see the two running women from the previous episode and hide, only to be spotted.
8	"Foreboding Wind in the Ancient Country"; Transliteration: "Fēng qǐ gǔguó" (Chinese: 风起古国)	December 12, 2020
Nan Feng draws the women away, while the others head for the ruined palace. San Lang finds the herb and uses it to heal Xie Lian, but the group is captured by the undead Banyue army. The soldiers, led by General Ke Mo, bring the group to the “Sinner’s Pit” jail. Ke Mo declares that two people will be thrown to the pit’s bottom. A-Zhao is thrown, and Ke Mo chooses a merchant’s child to be the second. Xie Lian attempts to convince Ke Mo to throw him instead, but a smiling San Lang jumps before Xie Lian is able to.
9	"Scourge of Evil Taoist"; Transliteration: "Yāo dào zhī huò" (Chinese: 妖道之祸)	December 19, 2020
A woman in black who was hanging above the pit suddenly appears and pushes all of Ke Mo’s soldiers into the Sinners’ Pit. Xie Lian and Ke Mo fall, sending Ke Mo into a fit of rage. Xie Lian is caught by San Lang who says that the floor is dirty and refuses to put him down. After convincing Ke Mo that they are not on the side of the Imperial Preceptor, Ke Mo starts answering Xie Lian's questioning. Xie Lian realizes that Ke Mo's Half-Moon Daoist enemy is the woman who just pushed the soldiers into the pit. Xie Lian still feels suspicious of the general’s story when the woman in black jumps down herself.
10	"Bygone Banyue Days"; Transliteration: "Bànyuè wǎngshì" (Chinese: 半月往事)	December 26, 2020
Xie Lian realizes the woman in black is the Imperial Preceptor that Ke Mo talked about, named Banyue. Ke Mo becomes enraged again and begins to beat the Imperial Precepter, but Xie Lian steps in to protect her. Getting a closer look, Banyue recognizes Xie Lian, calling him General Hua. Xie Lian realizes Banyue is the girl he saved when he was a General. After jumping into the pit to join them, Fu Yao figures out that Xie Lian is the General from the tombstone. Banyue tells her side of the story, how she opened the city gates leading to a massacre of Banyue soldiers and claiming she is unable to control the snakes. Snakes begin to rain down on them, engulfing the bottom of the pit in chaos.
11	"Sand-buried Rights and Wrongs"; Transliteration: "Shā mái gōngguò" (Chinese: 沙埋功过)	January 2, 2021
As the snakes rain down, Xie Lian realizes there’s a sixth person in the pit. He remembers a young heavenly official, Pei Xiu, who orchestrated a massacre before ascending. Both Ke Mo and Banyue recognize A-Zhao as Pei Xiu, Banyue's childhood friend. Suddenly, everyone gets pulled out of the pit by a strong wind. At the top, they see Nan Feng, a woman in teal, and a woman in black. The woman in teal turns out to be the Wind Master. She scolds Pei Xiu and apologizes to the rest for getting stuck in the wind storm earlier. The two woman take Ke Mo and Pei Xiu for punishment. Afterwards, Xie Lian returns to the cave with the antidote for the merchant who had been bitten. Xie Lian says his goodbyes, and Nan Feng and Fu Yao return to heaven.
12	"Special Episode"	February 14, 2021
After the events in Half-Moon Pass, Xie Lian, San Lang, and Banyue return to Puqi Temple. Xie Lian and San Lang talk about the old days, and Xie Lian reveals that he knows San Lang is actually Hua Cheng, the supreme Ghost King Crimson Rain Sought Flower. Banyue reminds Xie Lian of something he said 200 years ago that touched her deeply. Hua Cheng explains that while this body was his true form, this appearance was not his true face. Xie Lian asks if he can see Hua Cheng's real face, and he replies that the next time they meet he will see Hua Cheng's true appearance. When Xie Lian wakes, San Lang is no longer there.

==== Season 2 (2023–2024) ====
The English release switched platforms from Funimation to Crunchyroll but the Chinese release continued to be on Bilibili.

No.	Title (Note: All English titles are taken from Crunchyroll.)	Original release date
1	"The Ghost King Appears"; Transliteration: "Guǐ Wáng Xiànshēn" (Chinese: 鬼王現身)	October 18, 2023
The Heavenly Emperor Jun Wu returns to the capital and calls a meeting to decide the fate of Pei Xiu. Although General Pei Ming attempts to cast doubt on Xie Lian’s testimony, Pei Xiu confesses and is exiled. Jun Wu informs Xie Lian of his suspicions that a heavenly official is being held captive. Xie Lian and the Wind Master Shi Qingxuan infiltrate Ghost City to investigate.
2	"Accidentally Entered a Gambling Den"; Transliteration: "Dǔ Zhōng Línglóng" (Chinese: 賭盅玲瓏)	October 25, 2023
Xie Lian and Shi Qingxuan end up in a gambling den where Shi Qingxuan planned to meet the Martial God of the East, Lang Qianqiu. The gambling is being presided over by Hua Cheng, the ruler of Ghost City. A disapproving Lang Qianqiu interrupts the proceedings and Hua Cheng restrains him. He then announces that the winner of the next round will be given Lang Qianqiu as payment. Xie Lian wins after Hua Cheng instructs him on how to roll the die. Later, Xie Lian learns the bandit boy he met on Mount Yujun is in the city.
3	"Ghost Binding Cursed Shackle"; Transliteration: "Guǐ Shǐ Zhòu Jiā" (Chinese: 鬼使咒枷)	November 1, 2023
4	"The Secret Chamber"; Transliteration: "Mì Dào Chūtáo" (Chinese: 密道出逃)	November 8, 2023
5	"The Second Coming of Fang Xin"; Transliteration: "Fāng Xīn Zàilín" (Chinese: 芳心再臨)	November 15, 2023
6	"Heavenly Palace Raid"; Transliteration: "Wàn Dié Zhěng Jūn" (Chinese: 萬諜拯君)	December 6, 2023
7	"A Thousand Miles Away"; Transliteration: "Wéi Niàn Yīrén" (Chinese: 唯念一人)	December 13, 2023
8	"The Green-Clothed Ghost Qi Rong"; Transliteration: "Qīng Dēng Yè Yóu" (Chinese: 青燈夜遊)	December 20, 2023
9	"Yong An and Xian Le"; Transliteration: "Xiānlè Yǒng'ān" (Chinese: 仙樂永安)	December 27, 2023
10	"Bloodstained Banquet"; Transliteration: "Xiānlè Lùchū Zhēnmiànmù" (Chinese: 仙樂露出真面目)	January 3, 2024
11	"A Sad Parting Under Moonlight"; Transliteration: "Yuè Xià Xībié" (Chinese: 月下惜別)	January 10, 2024
12	"May All Taboos be Shattered"; Transliteration: "Sān Láng Gēgē Fēnbié" (Chinese: 三郞哥哥分別)	January 17, 2024

=== Live-action ===
A live-action series, Eternal Faith, began production in 2021. Chen Jialin will direct the series.

=== Audio drama ===
An audio drama adapting the revised version of the novel premiered on July 15th, 2022, on MaoerFM. It is produced by Xun Sheng Studios and recorded by Jing Yun Kai Ge Studio. At time of writing, the audio drama has released three complete seasons, with the fourth season airing as of August 2026.

== Characters ==
=== Main characters ===
Xie Lian (谢怜;)

Protagonist. A very unlucky god who collects scraps for a living. Also known by the titles Crown Prince, God-Pleasing Crown Prince, and Flower-Crowned Martial God.

Voiced by: Jiang Guangtao (donghua S1), Deng Youxi (donghua S2), Hiroshi Kamiya (Japanese dub), Park Yohan (Korean dub), Howard Wang (English dub), Non Sepho (นนท์ ศรีโพธิ์, Thai dub)

Hua Cheng (花城)

Main character and love interest. A ghost king known as the terror of the heavens. One of the Four Calamities. Also known as Crimson Rain Sought Flower (血雨探花) or San Lang (三郎).

Voiced by: Ma Zhengyang (donghua), Jun Fukuyama (Japanese dub), Jeong Joo-won (Korean dub), James Cheek (English dub), Sakarach Amsom (ศักราช อ่ำส้ม, Thai dub)

=== Heavenly Court ===
Jun Wu (君吾)
Voiced by: Takehito Koyasu (Japanese dub)

The Heavenly Emperor of the Upper Court. The most powerful martial god.

Ling Wen (灵文)

A civil goddess who provides information on assignments through a spiritual communication array. Also known as Ling Wen Zhen Jun (灵文真君).

Voiced by: Huang Ying (donghua), Yoko Hikasa (Japanese dub), Kim Bo-na (Korean dub), Wendee Lee (English dub)

Shi Wudu (师无渡)

The elemental master of water. Elder brother of Shi Qingxuan. Also known as Lord Water Master or the Water Tyrant.

Shi Qingxuan (师青玄)
Voiced by (female form): Qiu Qiu (donghua), Ayako Kawasumi (Japanese dub), Anjali Kunapaneni (English dub) Voiced by (male form): Lu Zhixing (donghua), Nobunaga Shimazaki (Japanese dub)

The elemental master of the wind. The younger sibling of Shi Wudu. Also known as Lord Wind Master or Lady Wind Master.

Ming Yi (明仪)

The elemental master of earth. Also known as Lord Earth Master or Lady Earth Master.

Yushi Huang (雨师篁)

The elemental master of rain. Also known as the Rain Master.

Feng Xin (风信)

The martial god of the southeast. Was in service to Xie Lian when he was still the prince of Xianle. Also known by the title General Nan Yeng (南阳真君).

Voiced by: Wen Sen (donghua)

Nan Feng (南风)

A Middle Court junior official from the palace of General Nan Yang.

Voiced by: Wen Sen (donghua), Makoto Furukawa (Japanese dub), Choi Seung-hun (Korean dub), Phil Song (English dub)

Mu Qing (慕情)

The martial god of the southwest. Was also in service to Xie Lian when he was still the prince of Xianle. Also known by the title General Xuan Zhen (玄真将军).

Voiced by: Hu Liangwei (donghua)

Fu Yao (扶摇)

A Middle Court junior official from the palace of General Xuan Zhen.

Voiced by: Hu Liangwei (donghua), Chiaki Kobayashi (Japanese dub), Nam Doh-hyeong (Korean dub), Lucien Dodge (English dub)

Pei Ming (裴茗)

The martial god of the north. Also known as General Ming Guang or General Pei.

Voiced by: Tu Xiongfei (donghua), Junichi Suwabe (Japanese dub), Aaron Campbell (English dub)

Pei Su (裴宿)

A martial god and an indirect descendant of Pei Ming. Also known as Little Pei or A-Zhao.

Voiced by: Ling Fei (donghua), Toshiki Masuda (Japanese dub), Aaron Campbell (English dub)

Quan Yizhen (权一真)

The martial god of the west. Also known as Qi Ying.

Lang Qianqiu (郎千秋)

The current martial god of the east. Also known as Prince Tai Hua.

=== Ghost Realm ===
Bai Wuxiang (白无相)

The main antagonist of the story. The eldest and the most powerful of the Four Great Calamities. He is the one responsible for the fall of the kingdom of Xianle. Also known as the White-Clothed Calamity (白衣祸世) or White No-Face.

He Xuan (贺玄)

One of the Four Calamities. A powerful water demon. Also known as Black Water Sinking Ships (黑水沉舟).

Qi Rong (戚容)

One of the Four Calamities. Ranks as a Savage, one step behind the other three Calamities' rankings of Supreme. Also known as the Night-Touring Green Lantern (青灯夜游) or Green Ghost.

Banyue (半月)

A Savage-ranked female ghost. Former State Preceptor of Banyue Kingdom.

Voiced by: Tao Dian (Donghua), Kana Hanazawa (Japanese dub), Emi Lo (English dub)

Xuan Ji (宣姬)

A Wrath-ranked female ghost. A former lover of Pei Ming before he ascended to the heavens.

Voiced by: Shan Xin (Donghua), Yuko Kaida (Japanese dub), Michelle Rojas (English dub)

=== Spiritual devices ===
Ruoye (若邪)

Xie Lian's spiritual device. A sentient strip of white silk.

E'ming (厄命)

Hua Cheng's spiritual device. A sentient scimitar.
