= Jinjiang Literature City =

Chinese publisher of web fiction

- Jinjiang Literature City logo
- Native name: 晋江文学城
- Romanized name: Jìnjiāng Wénxuéchéng (JJWXC)
- Former names: Jinjiang Original Network (晉江原創網, Jìnjiāng Yuánchuàng Wǎng)
- Company type: Publisher
- Available in: Simplified Chinese; Traditional Chinese
- Founded: August 1, 2003; 23 years ago
- Headquarters: Beijing, {{{location_country}}}
- Editors: Hao Yuan; Xi Ye; Jin Se; Zhuo Ran
- Website: jjwxc.net
- Users: 7 million

Jinjiang Literature City (simplified Chinese: 晋江文学城; traditional Chinese: 晉江文學城; pinyin: Jìnjiāng Wénxuéchéng) is a web fiction publisher and an Internet forum headquartered in Beijing, China. It is China's largest publisher of women's web fiction. While works published on Jinjiang Literature City represent a variety of genres, it is best known as a platform for original danmei novels. Jinjiang Literature City marked its 20th anniversary on 1 August 2023.

== History ==
The platform was launched on August 1, 2003. At launch, it was divided into two subsites: Jinjiang Literature City, a "library-like" repository of digitalized (and often pirated) copies of Chinese-language romance books, and Jinjiang Original Network, a platform on which authors could self-publish their works for free. Jinjiang Original Network was the basis for the website as it is known today. The "library-like" subsite was shut down in 2007 following claims of copyright infringement, and the platform has since focused on publishing original writing.

After experiencing financial difficulty, Jinjiang Literature City was purchased by Shanda Literature in 2007, and in January 2008 it implemented a pay-to-read system with which writers could monetize their work. Following a 2011 incident in which technical problems resulted in loss of income for authors, Jinjiang Literature City experienced a large-scale exodus of authors and users, triggering a crisis of trust in the platform.

In response to a 2014 anti-pornography campaign by the National Radio and Television Administration, Jinjiang Literature City banned many works and required authors of others to revise their stories to remove sexually explicit content. It also rebranded its danmei channel to "chun'ai" ("pure love") to minimize the visibility of danmei, as depictions of homosexuality are subject to censorship in China. That same year, a popular Jinjiang Literature City novelist was arrested for writing and selling sexually explicit publications. In an attempt to reduce her punishment, the novelist claimed editors at Jinjiang Literature City had pressured her to write pornography, culminating in a police investigation of the platform's management team. Jinjiang Literature City subsequently implemented a new content policy that limited depictions of intimacy to mouth-kissing and hand-holding. This policy, a means of self-censorship, was stricter than the government's own mandates.

China's National Office Against Pornographic and Illegal Publications, a pornography watchdog, reported in 2019 that Jinjiang Literature City contained unspecified "illegal" and "obscene" content and ordered several sections of the site closed. Jinjiang Literature City responded that it would comply with the order.

As of 2025, Jinjiang Literature City had 1.78 million registered writers and 46.91 million registered members. 97% of its active users lived in China's biggest metropolitan areas.

== Content ==
As of 2025, more than 500,000 works were hosted on Jinjiang Literature City, and the site had seven million users. Jinjiang Literature City's users are predominantly women, and as such, most of the literature it hosts is women-oriented. It is China's largest publisher of women's web fiction.

Most of the works Jinjiang Literature City publishes are in the romance genre. It is widely known as a publisher of high-quality original danmei (male same-sex romance) fiction, though it also hosts and publishes heterosexual romance and baihe (百合, bǎihé, female same-sex romance) stories, as well as works in other genres. As of 2022, 79 of the 100 most popular works on Jinjiang Literature City were danmei.

=== Banned content and self-censorship ===
Like other Chinese literature websites, Jinjiang Literature City practices self-censorship to avoid being targeted and punished by state censors. Sexually explicit content has been banned on Jinjiang Literature City since 2014, and the platform asks readers to report any pornographic content they find. It also employs software that automatically deletes "sensitive words" from published works, including phrases deemed pornographic or that refer to politically forbidden subjects (e.g., the 1989 Tiananmen Square protests). Since 2020, depictions of suicide have been banned from the site except in cases where the depictions align with government values, such as a character giving their life for their country.

== Notable publications ==
Notable works published by Jinjiang Literature City include:

- Bu Bu Jing Xin by Tong Hua
- Grandmaster of Demonic Cultivation and Heaven Official's Blessing by Mo Xiang Tong Xiu
- Guardian (镇魂, Zhèn Hún) by Priest, which was adapted into a web series of the same name

== See also ==
- Qidian, another Chinese literature website.
