= Danmei =

Chinese fiction genre depicting male same-sex relationships

Danmei (Chinese: 耽美; pinyin: dānměi; lit. 'addicted to beauty'; also known as BL) is a genre of Chinese literature and other fictional media that features homoerotic relationships between male characters. Derived from Japanese boys' love and influenced by Western slash fiction, danmei is a diverse genre that first emerged online in the late 1990s. Danmei works are primarily hosted online as web fiction, and they are typically consumed by heterosexual women, but also consumed by bisexual and gay individuals. People in China generally use the term yuandan (Chinese: 原耽; pinyin: yuándān) to refer to danmei, though it actually stands for "original danmei".

While danmei works and their adaptations have achieved widespread popularity and economic success in China and globally, their legal status remains precarious in China due to government censorship policies, and danmei authors and platforms have been targets of censorship.

== Etymology and terminology ==
The term danmei (耽美; dānměi) literally means "addicted to beauty". It is an orthographic reborrowing from the Japanese wasei-kango tanbi (耽美, lit. 'aestheticism'), which is one of several words used in Japan to refer to boys' love or BL. Chinese fans often use danmei and BL interchangeably, though danmei is the preferred term. Female fans of danmei often refer to themselves as fu nu (腐女; fǔ nǚ; lit. 'rotten women'; also written fu nü or funü), a term borrowed from the Japanese fujoshi.

== History ==
The male same-sex romance genre of "boys' love", or BL, originated in Japanese manga in the early 1970s, and was introduced to mainland China via pirated Taiwanese translations of Japanese comics in the early 1990s. Chinese fans referred to this genre as danmei, a reborrowing from the Japanese tanbi, which in Japan typically refers to BL prose fiction. Danmei as a genre was also influenced by Western slash fiction, with Chinese fans incorporating elements of both BL and slash fiction into their original stories in ways that suited their local context.

The first danmei story was posted online around 1998. By 1999, several online danmei forums had been founded. These venues started as communities for Chinese fans of Japanese BL, but soon began hosting fanworks and original danmei stories by young Chinese women. 1999 also saw the founding of the first print magazine devoted to danmei, Danmei Season, which was published continuously until 2013 despite not having an official permit to do so.

While early online danmei communities were largely run by amateur fans of the genre, those websites were gradually supplanted by a slew of commercial online fiction websites founded in the early 2000s. The largest of these, Jinjiang Literature City, was founded in 2003 and has since amassed 7 million registered users and over 500,000 titles. The works published on Jinjiang Literature City include both original works and fan fiction, and heterosexual, gay and lesbian romance as well as stories in other genres, but it is best known as a platform for original danmei novels.

Danmei reached wider audiences in China and elsewhere in the late 2010s and early 2020s, with censored danmei adaptations like Guardian, The Untamed, and Word of Honor receiving billions of views and broad international distribution. In 2020, film and television producers purchased the rights to 59 danmei titles. In 2022, scholars Yanrui Xu and Ling Yang described danmei as "a significant economic and cultural force in China" and said that it "might well be one of the few created-in-China cultural products that have gained a foothold in overseas markets and potentially enhanced China's soft power despite continuous censorship at home".

=== Censorship in China ===
==== Background: Censorship of pornography and LGBTQ fiction ====
Despite its popularity, danmei media is a frequent target of legal action by the Chinese government because it "breaks two social taboos in one shot: pornography and homosexuality." Pornography is illegal in China, although the exact laws regarding its possession and distribution are blurry, and danmei literature with sex scenes deemed particularly explicit is classified as obscenity. Since 1998, when the Chinese Communist Party began the Great Firewall project, Internet users in China have been at least partially blocked from online access to sexually explicit content, though many danmei writers and fans, like other Internet users, have found ways to bypass the Great Firewall.

Homosexuality itself was decriminalized in China in 1997, but since 2007, China's National Radio and Television Administration (NRTA) has nonetheless deemed depictions of homosexuality subject to censorship. It is also illegal in China to profit from the sale of "obscene materials", and earning more than ¥250,000 from the sale of literature deemed obscene can result in life imprisonment. Vague legal definitions of "obscenity" and "abnormal sexual behavior" may result in greater scrutiny and censorship of even non-explicit queer literature.

==== 2004–2015: Actions against danmei platforms and authors ====
Anti-porn crackdowns in 2004, 2010 and 2014 resulted in the closure of many danmei websites and forums. In 2011, Chinese authorities shut down a danmei website hosting 1,200 works, and its founder, Wang Ming, was fined and jailed for 18 months. In October 2018, a female danmei author who wrote under the pen name Tianyi was sentenced to 10 years in prison after her self-published homoerotic novel sold over 7,000 copies, violating laws regarding excessive commercial profit for unregistered books. The novel was more sexually explicit than the norm in danmei works, resulting in its classification as obscenity subject to criminal penalties if published without approval, having exceeded a certain level of profit. The case resulted in a public outcry in China from fans of danmei literature, with some commentators noting that the relevant laws dated from the 1980s before commercial publishing was significant and that public views about sex had changed significantly since those laws. Her appeals court proceedings were livestreamed and watched by over 2 million people in China. In the appeal, the prosecutor conceded procedural irregularities in the case and the appellate court remanded the case back to the lower court for further proceedings.

The strict censorship policies caused some danmei communities to self-police, with sites such as Jinjiang Literature City asking its readers to report explicit works for deletion. In the face of a 2014 anti-pornography campaign directly targeting danmei, online literature platforms implemented stringent self-censorship measures that particularly affected the danmei genre.

Baidu blocked several danmei-related forums on its Tieba platform, including "Danmei Bar" and "Funü Bar". Jinjiang Literature City adopted a different strategy by rebranding its danmei channel to "chun’ai" (lit. 'pure love') to distance itself from the genre's explicit associations. The platform also introduced stricter content regulations, surpassing government mandates by prohibiting depictions of body parts below the neck and limiting intimate scenes to non-sexual acts like mouth-kissing and handholding.

==== 2016–2020: Danmei adaptations ====
In early 2016, the gay web drama Addicted, which was based on a danmei novel, was abruptly removed from all mainland Chinese streaming platforms before it finished airing on orders from the NRTA. The following week, the China Television Drama Production Industry Association publicized guidelines dated 31 December 2015, that banned television portrayals of "abnormal sexual relationships and behaviors", including same-sex relationships. These new guidelines impacted web dramas, which have historically been subject to fewer restrictions than broadcast television. The NRTA went on to issue even stricter regulations regarding online shows in June 2017.

To comply with censorship policies, live-action danmei adaptations began to replace the explicitly homosexual romances of the source texts with deep homosocial friendships instead. Adaptations featuring such non-romantic relationships are sometimes called dangai instead of danmei, though dangai's literal meaning is simply "danmei adaptation". Several danmei novels have been adapted as live-action web dramas since 2017, skirting the regulations in this way while retaining queer subtext.

In 2018, shortly after releasing its final episode, the live-action danmei adaptation Guardian was pulled from streaming platforms for "content adjustments" following a directive from the NRTA to "clean up TV programmes of harmful and vulgar content". It was later re-released with scenes edited or deleted, apparently due to public complaints about homoerotic subtext. The following year, however, in a departure from the norm for danmei adaptations, The Untamed enjoyed massive national and global success and was even praised by the Chinese Communist Party's official newspaper, People's Daily.

==== 2021–2023: New regulatory approach ====
In early 2021, Word of Honour, a drama adaptation of a danmei novel by Priest, was released. The drama was commercially successful, but in August of that year, one of its lead actors was blacklisted by the Chinese Communist Party as an "immoral celebrity" owing to a visit he had once paid to a controversial shrine in Japan. As a result, all of the actor's works, including Word of Honour, were banned in China. While the banning of Word of Honour was apparently unrelated to its depiction of queer subtext, it was part of the state's "Internet Clean-up Campaign", which began in August 2021 and "marked a policy change towards more direct, severe criticism of and crackdown on the danmei genre".

Jinjiang Literature City officially banned external links to sexual material that same year, in an escalation of the platform's previous self-censorship strategies. As a result, many readers and experienced writers migrated to Changpei, a platform perceived as offering greater creative freedom. This relative liberty was short-lived, as Changpei's growth into a commercial danmei platform attracted the attention of state censors. To align with regulatory demands and sustain operations, Changpei eventually adopted self-censorship practices as well, removing explicit content and urging authors to avoid publishing sexually explicit scenes.

Also in 2021, a new regulatory approach targeting danmei adaptations emerged, combining state media criticism with authoritative measures to enforce self-censorship on digital platforms. This marked a significant clampdown on danmei-inspired dramas, following a series of critical state media articles that framed them as "vulgar culture" in line with the Internet Clean-up Campaign. Editorials, such as those by Xinhua News Agency in March 2021, argued that danmei stories encouraged irrational fanaticism and consumerism among adolescents, necessitating regulation. In August, the Guangming Daily, a newspaper run by the Chinese Communist Party, criticized the perceived vulgarity of male-male flirting and the distortion of male aesthetics through femininity, and advocated for hyper-masculinity as the state-preferred standard. This stance dismissed opposing viewpoints as harmful to youth values.

In September 2021, the Central Propaganda Department released the "Article of Comprehensive Management of the Cultural and Entertainment Sector," highlighting concerns about "traffic and commercial dominance," "distorted aesthetics," "fandom chaos," and the detrimental social influence of danmei adaptations, particularly on teenagers. High-profile meetings with major companies like Tencent and NetEase underscored the need for increased political compliance. The NRTA reinforced these efforts with a September conference explicitly boycotting danmei adaptations and addressing fandom issues. This regulatory push resulted in a dramatic decline in danmei-inspired dramas, reversing the genre's earlier success following Addiction in 2016. The once-common strategy of portraying male friendship as a façade for danmei themes was no longer tolerated. Many completed dramas, such as Immortality and You by My Side, remain unreleased due to state restrictions, signaling the end of a brief period of prosperity for the genre.

In early 2023, the danmei video adaptations began to emerge again.

==== 2024–present: Arrests of Haitang authors ====
Some mainland Chinese danmei authors circumvent the restrictions on pornography by hosting the explicit portions of their work on Taiwanese literature websites. This strategy has not, however, kept authors entirely safe from prosecution. In 2024, at least a dozen mainland Chinese danmei authors who published their sexually explicit work on the Taiwanese BL website Haitang Literature City were arrested, charged, and tried on obscenity charges. Some of the authors were sentenced to years in prison and heavily fined. Further arrests occurred in 2025.

The arrests sparked widespread expressions of outrage on Weibo and WeChat and resulted in some authors "deleting stories, withdrawing from platforms, or halting publication altogether". Some author accounts have been suspended and others have disappeared.

In September 2025, one of the most popular audio-drama platforms in China, Maoer FM, removed some danmei-themed audio-dramas for "technical reasons" by phase, though some of them have been resurrected after a thorough deletion of sensitive contents. This resulted in further worries about the subsistence of danmei under the current situation.

== Genre characteristics ==
Danmei works always feature a central romance between men, but otherwise vary widely. Many draw on wuxia and xianxia tropes and settings or incorporate elements of other genres like sports or science fiction, and some authors blend danmei with genres more recently imported to China, such as steampunk and zombie stories. Other sub-genres of danmei works include farming fiction, which contains detailed descriptions of domestic life and daily activities.

It is common, but not universal, for the two male protagonists of a danmei work to be divided into gong (攻; gōng; lit. 'attacker') and shou (受; shòu; lit. 'receiver') roles, meaning "top" and "bottom". These roles are analogous to the Japanese seme and uke. Some works do not incorporate these roles and instead refer to the protagonists as hugong (互攻; hùgōng; lit. 'mutually attacking'). Scholars such as Yao Zhao and Anna Madill have noted that danmei adheres to heteronormative gender roles within same-sex relationships. Since the mid-2010s, danmei literature has expanded to encompass a wider variety of relationship dynamics, though the gong-shou model remains dominant in the genre.

Danmei works are a community-based literary practice and therefore use stylistic conventions and terminology that may not be intelligible to general readers.

Some prominent danmei authors have responded to government censorship by incorporating nationalist themes into their works, as state censors in China "[look] favourably on celebrations of Chinese nationalism". Scholars Zhange Ni, Eve Ng, and Xiaomeng Li have described this as a Chinese homonationalism.

Danmei works are primarily written by urban Han women.

== Audience ==
Most danmei fans are Chinese, and heterosexual women predominate among Chinese danmei fans. A 2015–2018 survey of Chinese danmei audiences found that around 88% identify as female, 66.5% as heterosexual, 15.7% as bisexual, and 2.7% as homosexual. Fans of danmei cite equality between partners as part of the appeal of the genre, especially in comparison to heterosexual romance.

Researcher Anna Madill has written that among danmei fans in the Anglosphere, "there is a sizable proportion of women with very heterogeneous sexual identifications (and uncertainties) and a relatively small, but not negligible, group of gay male fans."

== Media ==
Most popular danmei properties originate as web novels that are published serially on websites like Jinjiang Literature City, Liancheng Read, and Danmei Chinese Web. Readers pay for new chapters as they are released, as is common in Chinese online literature. Complete novels may also be published as physical editions in China (either self-published or via Taiwanese publishers) and abroad. Fan translation of Chinese web novels, especially danmei, is widespread.

Danmei novels are often adapted as manhua (comics), donghua (animation), audio dramas, and live-action television series, which may or may not retain textual queer elements. In the late 2010s and early 2020s, live-action adaptations of danmei achieved major commercial success via both producers' and audiences' negotiation with the demands of the Chinese government censorship and broader consumer culture. Following a government crackdown in 2021, however, few if any adaptations have been green-lit by state censors in China, and several completed adaptations remain unreleased.

Original comics remain uncommon in danmei relative to Japanese BL, where manga is the dominant medium.

== See also ==
- Gay literature
- Homosexuality in China
- LGBTQ themes in Chinese mythology
