= Ethnic conflict =

Conflict between ethnic groups

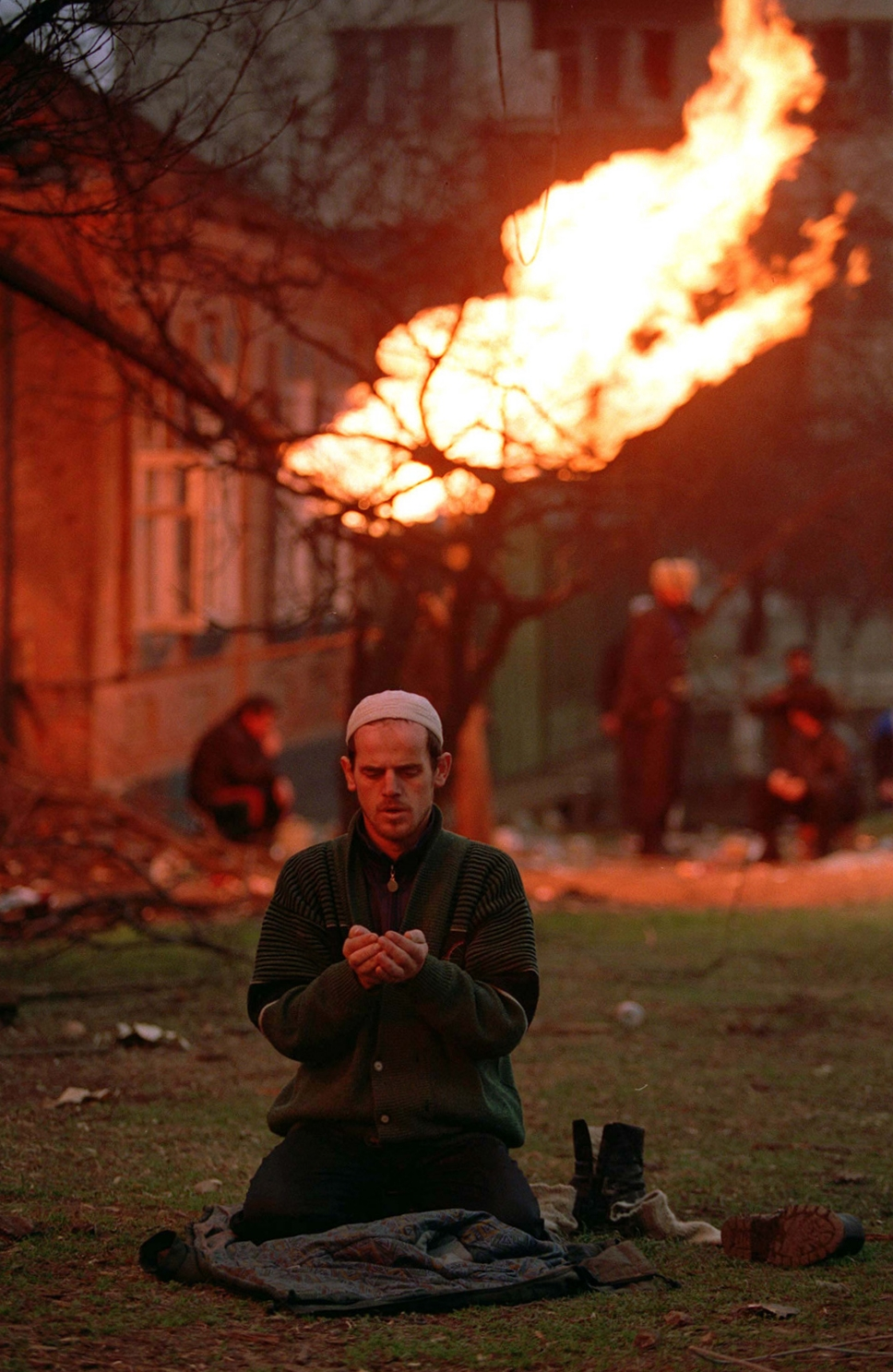
A Chechen man praying during the Battle of Grozny, 1995

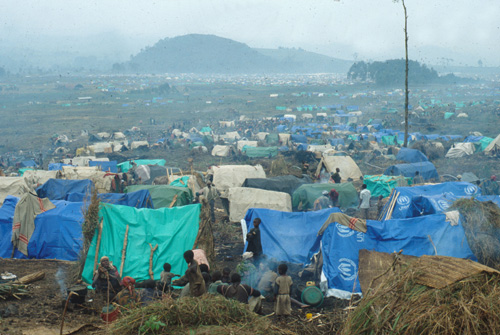
A refugee camp for displaced Rwandans in Zaire following the Rwandan genocide of 1994

An ethnic conflict is a conflict between two or more ethnic groups. While the source of the conflict may be political, social, economic or religious, the individuals in conflict must expressly fight for their ethnic group's position within society. This criterion differentiates ethnic conflict from other forms of struggle.

Academic explanations of ethnic conflict generally fall into one of three schools of thought: primordialist, instrumentalist or constructivist. Recently, some have argued for either top-down or bottom-up explanations for ethnic conflict. Intellectual debate has also focused on whether ethnic conflict has become more prevalent since the end of the Cold War, and on devising ways of managing conflicts, through instruments such as consociationalism and federalisation.

== Theories of causes ==
It is argued that rebel movements are more likely to organize around ethnicity because ethnic groups are more apt to be aggrieved, better able to mobilize, and more likely to face difficult bargaining challenges compared to other groups. The causes of ethnic conflict are debated by political scientists and sociologists. Official academic explanations generally fall into one of three schools of thought: primordialist, instrumentalist, and constructivist. More recent scholarship draws on all three schools.

=== Primordialist accounts ===
Proponents of primordialist accounts argue that "[e]thnic groups and nationalities exist because there are traditions of belief and action towards primordial objects such as biological features and especially territorial location". Primordialist accounts rely on strong ties of kinship among members of ethnic groups. Donald L. Horowitz argues that this kinship "makes it possible for ethnic groups to think in terms of family resemblances".

Clifford Geertz, a founding scholar of primordialism, asserts that each person has a natural connection to perceived kinsmen. In time and through repeated conflict, essential ties to one's ethnicity will coalesce and will interfere with ties to civil society. Ethnic groups will consequently always threaten the survival of civil governments but not the existence of nations formed by one ethnic group. Thus, when considered through a primordial lens, ethnic conflict in multi-ethnic society is inevitable.

A number of political scientists argue that the root causes of ethnic conflict do not involve ethnicity per se but rather institutional, political, and economic factors. These scholars argue that the concept of ethnic war is misleading because it leads to an essentialist conclusion that certain groups are doomed to fight each other when in fact the wars between them that occur are often the result of political decisions.

Moreover, primordial accounts do not account for the spatial and temporal variations in ethnic violence. If these "ancient hatreds" are always simmering under the surface and are at the forefront of people's consciousness, then ethnic groups should constantly be ensnared in violence. However, ethnic violence occurs in sporadic outbursts. For example, Varshney points out that although Yugoslavia broke up due to ethnic violence in the 1990s, it had enjoyed a long peace of decades before the USSR collapsed. Therefore, some scholars claim that it is unlikely that primordial ethnic differences alone caused the outbreak of violence in the 1990s.

Primordialists have reformulated the "ancient hatreds" hypothesis and have focused more on the role of human nature. Petersen argues that the existence of hatred and animosity does not have to be rooted in history for it to play a role in shaping human behavior and action: "If 'ancient hatred' means a hatred consuming the daily thoughts of great masses of people, then the 'ancient hatreds' argument deserves to be readily dismissed. However, if hatred is conceived as a historically formed 'schema' that guides action in some situations, then the conception should be taken more seriously."

=== Instrumentalist accounts ===
Anthony Smith notes that the instrumentalist account "came to prominence in the 1960s and 1970s in the United States, in the debate about (white) ethnic persistence in what was supposed to have been an effective melting pot". This new theory sought explained persistence as the result of the actions of community leaders, "who used their cultural groups as sites of mass mobilization and as constituencies in their competition for power and resources, because they found them more effective than social classes". In this account of ethnic identification, ethnicity and race are viewed as instrumental means to achieve particular ends.

Whether ethnicity is a fixed perception or not is not crucial in the instrumentalist accounts. Moreover, the scholars of this school generally do not oppose the view that ethnic difference plays a part in many conflicts. They simply claim that ethnic difference is not sufficient to explain conflicts.

Mass mobilization of ethnic groups can only be successful if there are latent ethnic differences to be exploited, otherwise politicians would not even attempt to make political appeals based on ethnicity and would focus instead on economic or ideological appeals. For these reasons, it is difficult to completely discount the role of inherent ethnic differences. Additionally, ethnic entrepreneurs, or elites, could be tempted to mobilize ethnic groups in order to gain their political support in democratizing states. Instrumentalist theorists especially emphasize this interpretation in ethnic states in which one ethnic group is promoted at the expense of other ethnicities.

Furthermore, ethnic mass mobilization is likely to be plagued by collective action problems, especially if ethnic protests are likely to lead to violence. Instrumentalist scholars have tried to respond to these shortcomings. For example, Russell Hardin argues that ethnic mobilization faces problems of coordination and not collective action. He points out that a charismatic leader acts as a focal point around which members of an ethnic group coalesce. The existence of such an actor helps to clarify beliefs about the behavior of others within an ethnic group.

=== Constructivist accounts ===
A third, constructivist, set of accounts stress the importance of the socially constructed nature of ethnic groups, drawing on Benedict Anderson's concept of the imagined community. Proponents of this account point to Rwanda as an example because the Tutsi/Hutu distinction was codified by the Belgian colonial power in the 1930s on the basis of cattle ownership, physical measurements and church records. Identity cards were issued on this basis, and these documents played a key role in the genocide of 1994.

Some argue that constructivist narratives of historical master cleavages are unable to account for local and regional variations in ethnic violence. For example, Varshney highlights that in the 1960s "racial violence in the USA was heavily concentrated in northern cities; southern cities though intensely politically engaged, did not have riots". A constructivist master narrative is often a country level variable whereas studies of incidences of ethnic violence are often done at the regional and local level.

Scholars of ethnic conflict and civil wars have introduced theories that draw insights from all three traditional schools of thought. In The Geography of Ethnic Violence, Monica Duffy Toft shows how ethnic group settlement patterns, socially constructed identities, charismatic leaders, issue indivisibility, and state concern with precedent setting can lead rational actors to escalate a dispute to violence, even when doing so is likely to leave contending groups much worse off. Such research addresses empirical puzzles that are difficult to explain using primordialist, instrumentalist, or constructivist approaches alone. As Varshney notes, "pure essentialists and pure instrumentalists do not exist anymore".

== History ==
Historians generally divide this history of this subject into several periods, each with different defining characteristics.

1. Pre-Modern Era: Fluidity and Empire
2. Colonialism & The Rise of the Nation-State (19th - Mid 20th Century)
3. The Cold War: Frozen Conflicts (1945–1990)
4. Post-Cold War: The Explosion (1990–Present)

During the Pre-Modern Era, conflict was often about fealty to a ruler or faith in a god, not genetic or linguistic purity. While tribal and linguistic differences existed, identities were often fluid. The concept of the "nation-state" (a political unit inhabited by a single people) did not yet exist to politicize these differences.

As to colonialism and the rise of the nation-state, there were 2 major forces at play: European nationalism and the more colonial, "divide and rule". European nationalism held the idea that every "people" deserved their own state (self-determination) which led to the collapse of multi-ethnic empires such as the Ottoman and Austro-Hungarian empires and general violent unmixing of peoples. "Divide and rule" was a strategy implemented by colonial powers (among others) in which they often codified fluid social groups into rigid racial or ethnic hierarchies to simplify administration, which led to strife and hostilities by pitting communities against each other.

During the Cold War, ethnic tensions were often suppressed by authoritarians regimes or subsumed under the ideological battle between Capitalism and Communism. "Proxy wars" were fought over ideology, often masking underlying ethnic grievances. Therefore, once the Soviet Union collapsed, power vacuums were born and the now unsuppressed ethnic strife, reappeared and caused civil wars on ethnic lines. This led to things such as the "New Wars", conflicts like Yugoslavia, Rwanda, and Chechnya that were characterized by identity politics and ethnic cleansing rather than geopolitics. This also led to instrumentalism, political elites deliberately manipulating ethnic fears to maintain power in tumultuous societies. This era birthed the modern field of ethnic conflict studies, debating whether these conflicts were "ancient hatreds" returned or modern political manipulations.

== Study in the post-Cold War world ==
Map of Myanmar Civil War (updated 2025). The Government of Myanmar and various ethnic nationalist rebel groups are fighting against each other since 1948.

One of the most debated issues relating to ethnic conflict is whether it has become more or less prevalent in the post–Cold War period. Even though a decline in the rate of new ethnic conflicts was evident in the late 1990s, ethnic conflict remains the most common form of armed intrastate conflict today. At the end of the Cold War, academics including Samuel P. Huntington and Robert D. Kaplan predicted a proliferation of conflicts fueled by civilisational clashes, tribalism, resource scarcity and overpopulation.

The violent ethnic conflicts in Nigeria, Mali, Sudan and other countries in the Sahel region have been exacerbated by droughts, food shortages, land degradation, and population growth.

However, some theorists contend that this does not represent a rise in the incidence of ethnic conflict, because many of the proxy wars fought during the Cold War as ethnic conflicts were actually hot spots of the Cold War. Research shows that the fall of Communism and the increase in the number of capitalist states were accompanied by a decline in total warfare, interstate wars, ethnic wars, revolutionary wars, and the number of refugees and displaced persons. Indeed, some scholars have questioned whether the concept of ethnic conflict is useful at all. Others have attempted to test the "clash of civilisations" thesis, finding it to be difficult to operationalise and that civilisational conflicts have not risen in intensity in relation to other ethnic conflicts since the end of the Cold War.

A key question facing scholars who attempt to adapt their theories of interstate violence to explain or predict large-scale ethnic violence is whether ethnic groups could be considered "rational" actors. Prior to the end of the Cold War, the consensus among students of large-scale violence was that ethnic groups should be considered irrational actors, or semi-rational at best. If true, general explanations of ethnic violence would be impossible. In the years since, however, scholarly consensus has shifted to consider that ethnic groups may in fact be counted as rational actors, and the puzzle of their apparently irrational actions (for example, fighting over territory of little or no intrinsic worth) must therefore be explained in some other way. As a result, the possibility of a general explanation of ethnic violence has grown, and collaboration between comparativist and international-relations sub-fields has resulted in increasingly useful theories of ethnic conflict.

== Public goods provision ==
A major source of ethnic conflict in multi-ethnic democracies is over the access to state patronage. Conflicts over state resources between ethnic groups can increase the likelihood of ethnic violence. In ethnically divided societies, demand for public goods decreases as each ethnic group derives more utility from benefits targeted at their ethnic group in particular. These benefits would be less valued if all other ethnic groups had access to them. Targeted benefits are more appealing because ethnic groups can solidify or heighten their social and economic status relative to other ethnic groups whereas broad programmatic policies will not improve their relative worth. Politicians and political parties in turn, have an incentive to favor co-ethnics in their distribution of material benefits. Over the long run, ethnic conflict over access to state benefits is likely to lead to the ethnification of political parties and the party system as a whole where the political salience of ethnic identity increase leading to a self-fulfilling equilibrium: If politicians only distribute benefits on an ethnic basis, voters will see themselves primarily belonging to an ethnic group and view politicians the same way. They will only vote for the politician belonging to the same ethnic group. In turn, politicians will refrain from providing public goods because it will not serve them well electorally to provide services to people not belonging to their ethnic group. In democratizing societies, this could lead to ethnic outbidding and lead to extreme politicians pushing out moderate co-ethnics. Patronage politics and ethnic politics eventually reinforce each other, leading to what Chandra terms a "patronage democracy".

The existence of patronage networks between local politicians and ethnic groups make it easier for politicians to mobilize ethnic groups and instigate ethnic violence for electoral gain since the neighborhood or city is already polarized along ethnic lines. The dependence of ethnic groups on their co-ethnic local politician for access to state resources is likely to make them more responsive to calls of violence against other ethnic groups. Therefore, the existence of these local patronage channels generates incentives for ethnic groups to engage in politically motivated violence.

While the link between ethnic heterogeneity and under provision of public goods is generally accepted, there is little consensus around the causal mechanism underlying this relationship. To identify possible causal stories, Humphreys and Habyarimana ran a series of behavioral games in Kampala, Uganda, that involved several local participants completing joint tasks and allocating money amongst them. Contrary to the conventional wisdom, they find that participants did not favor the welfare of their co-ethnics disproportionately. It was only when anonymity was removed and everyone's ethnicity was known did co-ethnics decide to favor each other. Humphreys and Habyarimana argue that cooperation among co-ethnics is primarily driven by reciprocity norms that tend to be stronger among co-ethnics. The possibility of social sanctions compelled those who would not otherwise cooperate with their co-ethnics to do so. The authors find no evidence to suggest that co-ethnics display a greater degree of altruism towards each other or have the same preferences. Ethnic cooperation takes place because co-ethnics have common social networks and therefore can monitor each other and can threaten to socially sanction any transgressors.

== Ethnic conflict amplification ==
=== Online social media ===
In the early twenty-first century, the online social networking service Facebook has played a role in amplifying ethnic violence in the Rohingya genocide that started in October 2016 and in ethnic violence in Ethiopia during 2019–2020.

The United Nations Human Rights Council described Facebook as having been "a useful instrument for those seeking to spread hate" and complained that Facebook was unable to provide data on the extent of its role in the genocide.

During 2019–2020, posts on Facebook dominated the Internet in Ethiopia and played a major role in encouraging ethnic violence. An October 2019 Facebook post led to the deaths of 70 people in Ethiopia. In mid-2020, ethnic tensions in Ethiopia were amplified by online hate speech on Facebook that followed the 29 June assassination of Hachalu Hundessa. The Hachalu Hundessa riots, in which mobs "lynched, beheaded, and dismembered their victims", took place with "almost-instant and widespread sharing of hate speech and incitement to violence on Facebook, which whipped up people's anger", according to David Gilbert writing in Vice. People "call[ed] for genocide and attacks against specific religious or ethnic groups" and "openly post[ed] photographs of burned-out cars, buildings, schools and houses", according to Network Against Hate Speech, an Ethiopian citizens' group. Berhan Taye of Access Now stated that in Ethiopia, offline violence quickly leads to online "calls for ethnic attacks, discrimination, and destruction of property [that] goes viral". He stated, "Facebook's inaction helps propagate hate and polarization in a country and has a devastating impact on the narrative and extent of the violence."

== Ethnic conflict resolution ==
=== Institutional ethnic conflict resolution ===
A number of scholars have attempted to synthesize the methods available for the resolution, management or transformation of their ethnic conflict. John Coakley, for example, has developed a typology of the methods of conflict resolution that have been employed by states, which he lists as: indigenization, accommodation, assimilation, acculturation, population transfer, boundary alteration, genocide and ethnic suicide. John McGarry and Brendan O'Leary have developed a taxonomy of eight macro-political ethnic conflict regulation methods, which they note are often employed by states in combination with each other. They include a number of methods that they note are clearly morally unacceptable.

With increasing interest in the field of ethnic conflict, many policy analysts and political scientists theorized potential resolutions and tracked the results of institutional policy implementation. As such, theories often focus on which Institutions are the most appropriate for addressing ethnic conflict.

==== Consociationalism ====
Consociationalism is a power sharing agreement which coopts the leaders of ethnic groups into the central state's government. Each nation or ethnic group is represented in the government through a supposed spokesman for the group. In the power sharing agreement, each group has veto powers to varying degrees, dependent on the particular state. Moreover, the norm of proportional representation is dominant: each group is represented in the government in a percentage that reflects the ethnicity's demographic presence in the state. Another requirement for Arend Lijphart is that the government must be composed of a "grand coalition" of the ethnic group leaders which supposes a top-down approach to conflict resolution.

In theory, this leads to self governance and protection for the ethnic group. Many scholars maintain that since ethnic tension erupts into ethnic violence when the ethnic group is threatened by a state, then veto powers should allow the ethnic group to avoid legislative threats. Switzerland is often characterized as a successful consociationalist state.

A recent example of a consociational government is the post-conflict Bosnian government that was agreed upon in the Dayton Accords in 1995. A tripartite presidency was chosen and must have a Croat, a Serb, and a Bosniak. The presidents take turns acting as the forefront executive in terms of 8 months for 4 years. Many have credited this compromise of a consociational government in Bosnia for the end of the violence and the following long-lasting peace.

In contrast to Lijphart, several political scientists and policy analysts have condemned consociationalism. One of the many critiques is that consociationalism locks in ethnic tensions and identities. This assumes a primordial stance that ethnic identities are permanent and not subject to change. Furthermore, this does not allow for any "others" that might want to partake in the political process. As of 2012 a Jewish Bosnian is suing the Bosnian government for precluding him from running for presidential office since only a Croat, Serb, or Bosniak can run under the consociational government. Determining ethnic identities in advance and implementing a power sharing system on the basis of these fixed identities is inherently discriminatory against minority groups that might be not be recognized. Moreover, it discriminates against those who do not choose to define their identity on an ethnic or communal basis. In power sharing-systems that are based on pre-determined identities, there is a tendency to rigidly fix shares of representation on a permanent basis which will not reflect changing demographics over time. The categorization of individuals in particular ethnic groups might be controversial anyway and might in fact fuel ethnic tensions.

The inherent weaknesses in using pre-determined ethnic identities to form power sharing systems has led Ljiphart to argue that adopting a constructivist approach to consociationalism can increase its likelihood of success. The self-determination of ethnic identities is more likely to be "non-discriminatory, neutral, flexible and self-adjusting". For example, in South Africa, the toxic legacy of apartheid meant that successful consociation could only be built on the basis of the self-determination of groups. Ljiphart claims that because ethnic identities are often "unclear, fluid and flexible," self-determination is likely to be more successful than pre-determination of ethnic groups. A constructivist approach to consociational theory can therefore strengthen its value as a method to resolve ethnic conflict.

Another critique points to the privileging of ethnic identity over personal political choice. Howard has deemed consociationalism as a form of ethnocracy and not a path to true pluralistic democracy. Consociationalism assumes that a politician will best represent the will of his co-ethnics above other political parties. This might lead to the polarization of ethnic groups and the loss of non-ethnic ideological parties.

Horowitz has argued that a single transferable vote system could prevent the ethnification of political parties because voters cast their ballots in order of preference. This means that a voter could cast some of his votes to parties other than his co-ethnic party. This in turn would compel political parties to broaden their manifestos to appeal to voters across the ethnic divide to hoover up second and third preference votes.

==== Federalism ====
The theory of implementing federalism in order to curtail ethnic conflict assumes that self-governance reduces "demands for sovereignty". Hechter argues that some goods such as language of education and bureaucracy must be provided as local goods, instead of statewide, in order to satisfy more people and ethnic groups. Some political scientists such as Stroschein contend that ethnofederalism, or federalism determined along ethnic lines, is "asymmetric" as opposed to the equal devolution of power found in non-ethnic federal states, such as the United States. In this sense, special privileges are granted to specific minority groups as concessions and incentives to end violence or mute conflict.

The Soviet Union divided its structure into ethnic federal states termed Union Republics. Each Union Republic was named after a titular ethnic group who inhabited the area as a way to Sovietize nationalist sentiments during the 1920s. Brubaker asserts that these titular republics were formed in order to absorb any potential elite led nationalist movements against the Soviet center by incentivizing elite loyalty through advancement in the Soviet political structure.

Thus, federalism provides some self-governance for local matters in order to satisfy some of the grievances which might cause ethnic conflict among the masses. Moreover, federalism brings in the elites and ethnic entrepreneurs into the central power structure; this prevents a resurgence of top-down ethnic conflict.

Nevertheless, after the dissolution of the Soviet Union many critiques of federalism as an institution to resolve ethnic conflict emerged. The devolution of power away from the central state can weaken ties to the central state. Moreover, the parallel institutions created to serve a particular nation or ethnic group might provide significant resources for secession from the central state. As most states are unwilling to give up an integral portion of their territory, secessionist movements may trigger violence.

Furthermore, some competing elite political players may not be in power; they would remain unincorporated into the central system. These competing elites can gain access through federal structures and their resources to solidify their political power in the structure. According to V.P. Gagnon this was the case in the former Yugoslavia and its disintegration into its ethnic federal states. Ethnic entrepreneurs were able to take control of the institutionally allocated resources to wage war on other ethnic groups.

==== Non-territorial autonomy ====
A recent theory of ethnic tension resolution is non-territorial autonomy or NTA. NTA has emerged in recent years as an alternative solution to ethnic tensions and grievances in places that are likely to breed conflict. For this reason, NTA has been promoted as a more practical and state building solution than consociationalism. NTA, alternatively known as non-cultural autonomy (NCA), is based on the difference of jus solis and jus sanguinis, the principles of territory versus that of personhood. It gives rights to ethnic groups to self-rule and govern matters potentially concerning but limited to: education, language, culture, internal affairs, religion, and the internally established institutions needed to promote and reproduce these facets. In contrast to federalism, the ethnic groups are not assigned a titular sub-state, but rather the ethnic groups are dispersed throughout the state unit. Their group rights and autonomy are not constrained to a particular territory within the state. This is done in order not to weaken the center state such as in the case of ethnofederalism.

The origin of NTA can be traced back to the Marxists works of Otto Bauer and Karl Renner. NTA was employed during the interwar period, and the League of Nations sought to add protection clauses for national minorities in new states. In the 1920s, Estonia granted some cultural autonomy to the German and Jewish populations in order to ease conflicts between the groups and the newly independent state.

In Europe, most notably in Belgium, NTA laws have been enacted and created parallel institutions and political parties in the same country. In Belgium, NTA has been integrated within the federal consociational system. Some scholars of ethnic conflict resolution claim that the practice of NTA will be employed dependent on the concentration and size of the ethnic group asking for group rights.

Other scholars, such as Clarke, argue that the successful implementation of NTA rests on the acknowledgement in a state of "universal" principles: true rule of law, established human rights, stated guarantees to minorities and their members to use their own quotidien language, religion, and food practices, and a framework of anti-discrimination legislation in order to enforce these rights. Moreover, no individual can be forced to adhere, identify, or emphasize a particular identity (such as race, gender, sexuality, etc.) without their consent in order for NTA to function for its purpose.

Nonetheless, Clarke critiques the weaknesses of NTA in areas such as education, a balance between society wide norms and intracommunity values; policing, for criminal matters and public safety; and political representation, which limits the political choices of an individual if based solely on ethnicity. Furthermore, the challenge in evaluating the efficacy of NTA lies in the relatively few legal implementations of NTA.

==== Cultural rights ====
Emphasizing the limits of approaches that focus mainly on institutional answers to ethnic conflicts—which are essentially driven by ethnocultural dynamics of which political and/or economic factors are but elements—Gregory Paul Meyjes urges the use of intercultural communication and cultural-rights based negotiations as tools with which to effectively and sustainably address inter-ethnic strife. Meyjes argues that to fully grasp, preempt, and/or resolve such conflicts—whether with or without the aid of territorial or non-territorial institutional mechanism(s) -- a cultural rights approach grounded in intercultural knowledge and skill is essential.

=== Ethnic conflict resolution outside formal institutions ===
==== Informal inter-ethnic engagement ====
Institutionalist arguments for resolving ethnic conflict often focus on national-level institutions and do not account for regional and local variation in ethnic violence within a country. Despite similar levels of ethnic diversity in a country, some towns and cities have often found to be especially prone to ethnic violence. For example, Ashutosh Varshney, in his study of ethnic violence in India, argues that strong inter-ethnic engagement in villages often disincentivizes politicians from stoking ethnic violence for electoral gain. Informal interactions include joint participation in festivals, families from different communities eating together or allowing their children to play with one another. Every day engagement between ethnic groups at the village level can help to sustain the peace in the face of national level shocks like an ethnic riot in another part of the country. In times of ethnic tension, these communities can quell rumors, police neighborhoods and come together to resist any attempts by politicians to polarize the community. The stronger the inter-ethnic networks are, the harder it is for politicians to polarize the community even if it may be in their political interest to do so.

==== Formal inter-ethnic associations ====
In cities where the population tends to be much higher, informal interactions between ethnic groups might not be sufficient to prevent violence. This is because many more links are needed to connect everyone, and therefore it is much more difficult to form and strengthen inter-ethnic ties. In cities, formal inter-ethnic associations like trade unions, business associations and professional organizations are more effective in encouraging inter-ethnic interactions that could prevent ethnic violence in the future. These organizations force ethnic groups to come together based on shared economic interests that overcomes any pre-existing ethnic differences. For example, inter-ethnic business organizations serve to connect the business interests of different ethnic groups which would increase their desire to maintain ethnic harmony. Any ethnic tension or outbreak of violence will go against their economic interests and therefore, over time, the salience of ethnic identity diminishes.

Interactions between ethnic groups in formal settings can also help countries torn apart by ethnic violence to recover and break down ethnic divisions. Paula Pickering, a political scientist, who studies peace-building efforts in Bosnia, finds that formal workplaces are often the site where inter-ethnic ties are formed. She claims that mixed workplaces lead to repeated inter-ethnic interaction where norms of professionalism compel everyone to cooperate and to treat each other with respect, making it easier for individuals belonging to the minority group to reach out and form relationships with everyone else. Nevertheless, Giuliano's research in Russia has shown that economic grievances, even in a mixed workplace, can be politicized on ethnic lines.

== Examples of ethnic conflicts ==
- Human rights in Ethiopia
- Ethnic violence in Konso
- Ethnic violence against Amaro Koore
- Sampit conflict
- Caste War of Yucatán
- Russo-Ukrainian War
- Indo-Pakistani war of 1947–1948
- Bangladesh Liberation War
- Insurgency in Balochistan
- First Sino-Japanese War
- Moro conflict
- Basque conflict
- Bersiap
- Mali war
- Italo-Turkish War
- Maluku sectarian conflict
- Caucasian War
- Tigray War
- Cyprus problem
- The Troubles
- Chechen-Russian conflict
- Nagorno-Karabakh conflict
- Philippine–American War
- Polish-Ukrainian War
- Polish-Ukrainian ethnic conflict during World War II
- Russo-Turkish wars
- Occupation of Poland during World War II
- Hungarian-Romanian War
- American Indian Wars
- Amhara genocide
- Guatemalan genocide
- Arab–Israeli conflict
- Ituri conflict
- Kivu conflict
- Communal conflicts in Nigeria
- Sudanese nomadic conflicts
- Oromo–Somali clashes
- Tuareg rebellions (disambiguation) (multiple)
- Turco-Persian wars
- Kurdish–Turkish conflict (1978–present)
- Ethnic conflict in Nagaland
- Internal conflict in Myanmar
- Fulani-Mossi conflict
- Lebanese Civil War
- Sri Lankan Civil War
- Insurgency in Manipur
- Human rights abuses in Manipur

=== 1910s ===
- Armenian genocide
- Greek genocide

=== 1980s ===
- Isaaq genocide

=== 1990s ===
- Yugoslav Wars
- Rwandan genocide
- Transnistria War
- War in Abkhazia (1992–1993)

=== 2010s ===
- Central African Republic conflict (2013–2014)
- Rohingya genocide

=== 2020s ===
- 2020 Dungan–Kazakh ethnic clashes

== See also ==
- Accelerationism
- Communal violence
- Cultural conflict
- Cultural rights
- Democide
- Diaspora politics
- Ethnic cleansing
- Ethnic hatred
- Ethnic nationalism
- Ethnic violence
- Genocide
- Hate crime
- List of ethnic cleansing campaigns
- List of ongoing military conflicts
- List of ethnic riots
- Political cleansing of population
- Population cleansing
- Social cleansing
