= John McGarry =

Irish Canadian political scientist

John McGarry, OC (born 1957) is a political scientist from Northern Ireland. He was born in Belfast and grew up in Ballymena, County Antrim. He is currently the Stephen Gyimah Distinguished University Professor in the Department of Political Studies at Queen's University in Kingston, Ontario, Canada.

== Biography ==
John McGarry is the author of numerous books about ethnic conflict and particularly The Troubles. Many of the books were co-authored with Brendan O'Leary, whom McGarry met when they both attended Saint MacNissi's College.

McGarry and O'Leary's Explaining Northern Ireland: Broken Images (Blackwells, 1995) is widely regarded as the most authoritative (and most cited) book on the Northern Ireland conflict. Their Policing Northern Ireland: Proposals for a New Start (Blackstaff Press, 1999) influenced the work of the Independent Commission on Policing for Northern Ireland. The commission's work on reforming Northern Ireland's police dealt with one of the most intractable issues in the negotiations around the Good Friday Agreement.

In 2008–2009, McGarry served as the 'Senior Advisor on power-sharing' to the United Nations (Mediation Support Unit, Department of Political Affairs). Since that time, he has worked as a senior advisor to the UN-mediated negotiations on Cyprus and participated in the negotiations on Cyprus at Crans-Montana, Switzerland in June–July, 2017. Apart from Northern Ireland and Cyprus, McGarry has advised on a range of conflicts, including in Bosnia-Herzegovina, Iraq, Kosovo, and Ukraine.

His academic and applied contribution were recognised in 2010, when he was invested into the Royal Society of Canada. He won a Trudeau Fellowship Prize in 2011. In 2013, he was awarded the Queen Elizabeth II Diamond Jubilee Medal, and the Killam Prize. The latter is Canada's most prestigious research prize. In 2014, McGarry won the Innis-Gérin Medal from the Royal Society of Canada. In 2015, his research on conflict resolution was recognised by the Council of Ontario Universities (COU) as one of the top 50 examples of "game-changing" research conducted in Ontario during the past 100 years.

On 30 June 2016, McGarry was made an Officer of the Order of Canada by Governor General David Johnston for "his scholarly contributions to the study of ethnic conflict and for designing Governance Frameworks that promote peace." He won Canada's Molson Prize in the Social Sciences and Humanities in the same year. In 2022 he was awarded the Pearson Peace Medal, previous recipients of which include Romeo Dallaire, Louise Arbour, and Beverly McLachlin.

McGarry and O'Leary have long backed consociationalism (power-sharing) as a method of conflict management. Arend Lijphart has been a significant influence on their work. In 2009, a book entitled Consociational Theory: McGarry and O'Leary and the Northern Ireland Conflict was published, edited by Rupert Taylor.
