= Brendan O'Leary =

Irish political scientist (born 1958)

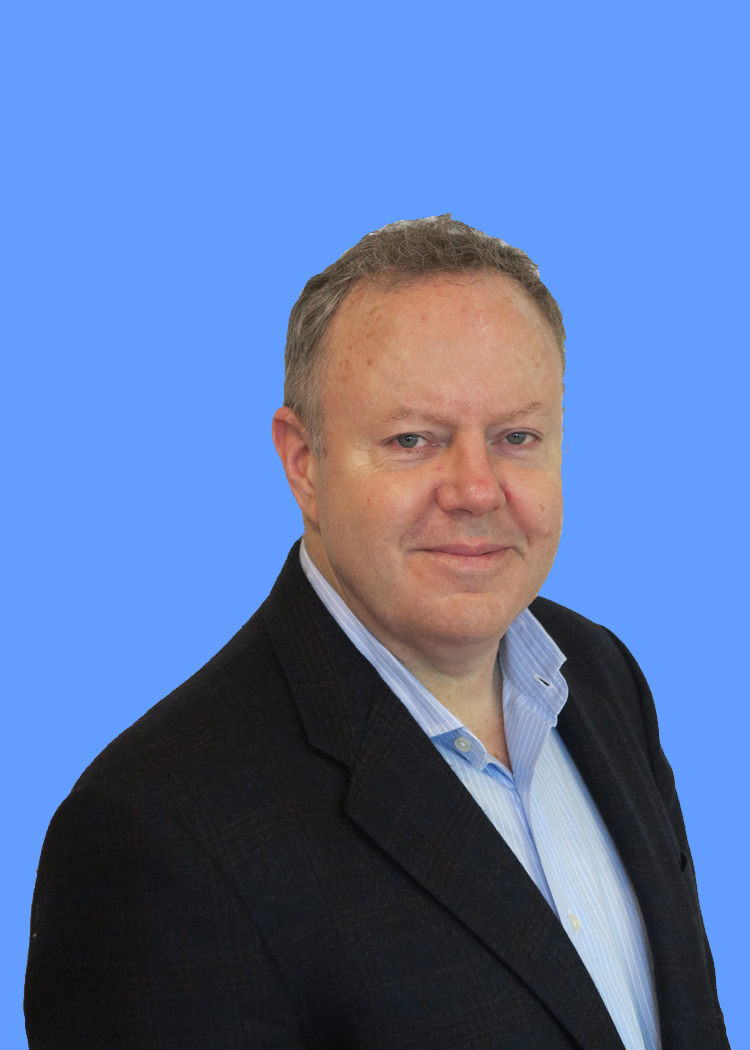
- Brendan O'Leary
- Born: 19 March 1958 (age 68)
- Citizenship: Irish
- Education: Keble College, Oxford, London School of Economics
- Occupation: Academic
- Employer(s): London School of Economics, University of Pennsylvania

Brendan O'Leary (born 19 March 1958) is an Irish political scientist, who is Lauder Professor of Political Science at the University of Pennsylvania. He was formerly a professor at the London School of Economics. In 2009–10 he was the second Senior Advisor on Power-Sharing in the Standby Team of the Mediation Support Unit of the Department of Political Affairs of the United Nations.

== Biography ==
O'Leary is the author of numerous books about the Northern Ireland conflict, many of them co-authored with John McGarry, whom he met when they both attended Saint MacNissi's College. McGarry and O'Leary's Policing Northern Ireland: Proposals for a New Start (Blackstaff Press, 1999) is considered to have had a significant influence on the work of the Independent Commission on Policing for Northern Ireland. He has been an international advisor to the Kurdistan National Assembly, responsible for advising on the constitutional reconstruction of Iraq and Kurdistan, with special responsibility for federal arrangements and electoral laws. He has also advised the United Nations, the European Union and the UK's Department for International Development.

He was a policy advisor to the British Labour Party, and political advisor to Mo Mowlam and Kevin McNamara during their spells as Shadow Secretary of State for Northern Ireland.

In both his own writings and those with John McGarry, O'Leary has long backed consociationalism as a method of conflict management for Northern Ireland, and is supportive of the Good Friday Agreement. In this regard, Arend Lijphart has been a significant influence on O'Leary's work. In 2009, a book entitled Consociational Theory: McGarry and O'Leary and the Northern Ireland Conflict was published, edited by Rupert Taylor.

He authored How to Get Out of Iraq with Integrity (University of Pennsylvania Press, 2009). Recent books include Power-Sharing in Deeply Divided Places (co-edited with J. McEvoy), Divided Nations and European Integration (co-edited with T.Mabry, J.McGarry and M. Moore), and Courts and Consociations (coauthored with Christopher McCrudden).

In 2017, he became a member of the Royal Irish Academy.
