= Donald L. Horowitz =

American academic (born 1939)

Donald L. Horowitz (born 1939) is James B. Duke Professor Emeritus of Law and Political Science at Duke Law School and Duke University in Durham, North Carolina, United States.

He earned his PhD from Harvard University in 1968 and also holds degrees from Syracuse University. He is a specialist in the study of ethnic conflict and author of the books Ethnic Groups in Conflict (University of California Press, 1985), A Democratic South Africa? Constitutional Engineering in a Divided Society (University of California Press, 1991), The Deadly Ethnic Riot (University of California Press, 2001) and Constitutional Change and Democracy in Indonesia (Cambridge University Press, 2013). Writing about Ethnic Groups in Conflict, political scientist Ashutosh Varshney states that it "was a seminal text", and that: "For the first time in scholarly history, a book on ethnic conflict covered a whole variety of topics, ranging from concepts and definitions to those spheres of institutional politics (party politics, military politics, affirmative action) in which the power of ethnicity had become obvious and could no longer be ignored".

Horowitz has acted as a consultant on the problems of divided societies and on policies to reduce ethnic conflict in locations including Russia, Romania, Nigeria, Tatarstan and Northern Ireland. In 2006, he was appointed to Secretary of State's Advisory Committee on Democracy Promotion.

== Centripetalism ==
Centripetalism, sometimes called integrationism, developed out of the criticism of consociationalism by Horowitz. It is a form of democratic power sharing for divided societies (usually along ethnic, religious or social lines) which aims to encourage the parties towards moderate and compromising policies and to reinforce the center of a divided political spectrum. Both models aim to provide institutional prescriptions for divided societies. While consociationalism manages ethnic conflict by letting ethnic elites bargain in a post-electoral grand coalition, centripetalism does so by fostering the emergence of pre-electoral coalitions of moderate ethnic parties at the centre that work to exclude ethnic extremists from politics.

Centripetalist institutions and voting systems are quite rare and there are not many examples of their use. The most famous examples come from Fiji (1997-2006), Northern Ireland (June 1973 to May 1974), Papua New Guinea, Sri Lanka, Indonesia, Kenya, and Nigeria.

=== Instruments ===
Centripetalism is associated with institutions that provide incentives for elite cooperation such as vote pooling. Vote pooling occurs when politicians need to attract voters from the different groups in order to win the elections. For example, if some ethnic group is not large enough to get their own ethnic political representative, voters from that group would prefer to cast their second preference to the moderate politicians of the other ethnicity, rather than to the radical politician of the other ethnicity. In this theoretical model, vote pooling gives advantages to the moderate politicians aiming to attract the votes from the other groups because of the electoral system allowing voters to indicate preferences. This model incentivizes the formation of pre-electoral coalitions across conflict lines.

Some centripetalists have advocated voting systems like the alternative vote or single transferable vote on these grounds; however, the alternative vote does not necessarily advantage moderate politicians compared to proportional representation, as it suffers from the center squeeze effect.

=== Criticism ===
One of the main problems of the theory is the lack of empirical evidence supporting the effectiveness of centripetalism. Centripetalist institutions do not work in the electoral systems in which electoral districts are homogenous, because in those cases politicians would not have incentives to create multi-ethnic parties as they do not need to appeal to the voters outside of their group. Some evidence suggests that centripetal institutions lead to more instability and extremism.

Strong supporters of consociationalism argue that centripetalism does not provide enough guarantees of representation and argue that what groups want is representation and not an indirect influence of majority decisions. O'Leary also notes that "centripetal vote-pooling institutions unfairly privilege the majority or largest group; politicians from such groups have to pool fewer votes to win office than do politicians from smaller groups.” McGarry also criticises that centripetalism tends to leave hardliners outside of the political system, which polarizes the political environment, making it impossible for moderates in the government to compromise. The moderates thus become more hardline.
