= Robin Stevens (author) =

American-born English author

- Born: 15 January 1988 (age 38); California, United States
- Occupation: Novelist
- Writing career
- Language: English
- Genre: Children's fiction
- Notable work: Murder Most Unladylike series
- Website: robin-stevens.co.uk

Robin Stevens (born 15 January 1988) is an American-born English author of children's fiction, best known for her Murder Most Unladylike series. She has spoken of the Golden Age of Detective Fiction as an influence on her work.

== Early life ==
Stevens was born in California and moved to Oxford, England at the age of three. She has dual US and UK citizenship. She attended The Dragon School and Cheltenham Ladies College. Her father, Robert Stevens, was Master of Pembroke College, Oxford, and her mother worked at Oxford University's Ashmolean Museum. Her grandfather was the literary critic Wayne C. Booth.

Stevens studied English at the University of Warwick, later gaining an MA in crime fiction from King's College London. She appeared as Captain of the Warwick University team on University Challenge.

== Career ==
Before becoming a full-time author, Stevens worked as a bookseller at Blackwell's bookshop in Oxford, and as an editor at Egmont.

Stevens started writing Murder Most Unladylike as part of National Novel Writing Month in November 2010, but did not send it to agencies for two years.

Stevens has cited the Golden Age of Detective Fiction as an influence on her work – particularly the authors Agatha Christie, Ngaio Marsh, Margery Allingham, and Dorothy L. Sayers.

In November 2020 she announced that she was to have a new book out in August 2021, called Once Upon a Crime. She also announced that there would be a new book (the first of a new series), coming out in 2022. The Ministry of Unladylike Activity will star Hazel Wong's (read below) little sister and two other characters, Eric and Nuala. This new series is set during World War II.

== Murder Most Unladylike ==
Stevens's eleven book series Murder Most Unladylike consists of schoolgirl detectives, Hazel Wong and Daisy Wells, as they solve murders. The series is set in the 1930s in England.

== Awards ==
Year	Award
2015	Oxfordshire Book Awards - Best Primary Novel, Murder Most Unladylike
2015	Waterstones Children's Book Prize - Best Younger Fiction, Murder Most Unladylike
2016	ALA Notable Children's Book, for Murder Most Unladylike (published as Murder is Bad Manners in the USA)
2017	CrimeFest Best Crime Novel for Children (ages 8–12), for Mistletoe and Murder

== Works ==
=== Series ===
- The Murder Most Unladylike Series
  - Murder Most Unladylike (2014)
  - Arsenic For Tea (2014)
  - First Class Murder (2015)
  - Jolly Foul Play (2016)
  - Mistletoe and Murder (2016)
  - Cream Buns and Crime: Tips, tricks and tales from the Detective Society (2017)
  - A Spoonful of Murder (2018)
  - Death in the Spotlight (2018)
  - Top Marks for Murder (2019)
  - The Case of the Drowned Pearl (2020)
  - Death Sets Sail (2020)
  - Once Upon a Crime (2021)
- The Ministry of Unladylike Activity Series
  - The Ministry of Unladylike Activity (2022)
  - The Body in the Blitz (2023)
  - Stocking Full of Spies (2025)

=== Standalone ===
- The Guggenheim Mystery (2017), a sequel to The London Eye Mystery by Siobhan Dowd

=== Contributor ===
- Mystery and Mayhem: Twelve Deliciously Intriguing Mysteries (2016)
- Return to Wonderland: Stories Inspired by Lewis Carroll's Alice (2019)
