= Horowitzian =

Horowitzian is an eponymous adjective and may refer to:

- Vladimir Horowitz (1903–1989), Russian-American classical virtuoso pianist
- Donald L. Horowitz (born 1939), professor of law and political science
