= Murder Most Unladylike =

2014 children's mystery novel by Robin Stevens

- UK edition
- Author: Robin Stevens
- Cover artist: Nina Tara
- Language: English
- Genre: Mystery fiction, Children's fiction
- Publisher: Puffin Books
- Publication date: 5 June 2014
- Publication place: United Kingdom
- Pages: 352
- Followed by: Arsenic for Tea

Murder Most Unladylike is a 2014 children's mystery novel by British-American author Robin Stevens. It follows two schoolgirls in 1930s England solving their first murder mystery and is the first book in the 'Murder Most Unladylike' series

The story is written in the style of a casebook and follows two fictional boarding schoolgirl detectives, Daisy Wells and Hazel Wong, as they try to find the murderer of their science teacher. The book has been nominated for several awards, including the Carnegie Medal. In the US, the book was published under the name Murder is Bad Manners.

== Plot ==
The two principal characters, Hazel Wong and Daisy Wells are students at Deepdean School for Girls. They are the founding members of the Wells and Wong Detective Society and its only members for that case. The book begins with Hazel recounting her discovery of the body of Miss Bell, the Science mistress, in the gymnasium on Monday 29 October 1934. Hazel realises that she has left her pullover in the gymnasium, so she hurries to collect it. There, she stumbles upon the corpse of Miss Bell, who has seemingly fallen from the balcony. However, when Hazel returns with Daisy, the body is gone. Thus, only Daisy believes that Hazel saw Miss Bell's dead body, and they are both punished for lying. The absence of the body means that the Detective Society believe they have discovered their first murder case.

Daisy and Hazel begin their detective work at Prayers the next morning. The other students notice the absence of Miss Bell, and are suspicious as she is known for her punctuality. The excitement is furthered when Miss Griffin, the headmistress, doesn't mention Miss Bell's absence following her sermon.

At bunbreak, Daisy discovers from talking to Henrietta Trilling (King Henry), who is the Head Girl, that Miss Bell resigned. She is told that there was a resignation letter on Miss Griffin's desk and that King Henry had been allowed to read it. This gives the detectives evidence that Miss Bell must've been murdered by someone who knew her handwriting well enough to forge such a letter, and with enough authority to place it on Miss Griffin's desk.

As the time since Miss Bell's disappearance extends, the rumours of her whereabouts spread between the students become more outlandish. Many students suspect her of being involved with a crime ring or secret organisation.

Daisy speaks to Jones about some windows broken in school and theorises that the damage could've been caused when the murderer moved Miss Bell's body.

On Thursday morning in Prayers, Miss Griffin finally confirms that Miss Bell resigned from her post as Science mistress, and scolds the girls for their gossip surrounding her absence.

At afternoon tea, Daisy spends it with fifth former, Alice Murgatroyd, which is unusual, as the students tend to remain with their own form. When she returns to where the third formers are sat, she tells her dormmates that she wants to have a midnight feast. Daisy suggests they use the Ouija board they had from a previous term. During this, the counter spells out "HELP. MURDER.". Kitty asks who is telling them this, with the response being "MISS BELL". By the end of Prayers the following morning, the news of the séance has spread across the school, and all of the students are aware of the possibility that Miss Bell was murdered.

Daisy and Hazel use ipecac to become ill during the school day, allowing them to stay in the main school building overnight to investigate. Daisy shows Hazel an old passageway, where she believes Miss Bell's body was kept before it was removed from the school. In the passageway, they find an earring that must've been lost by the murderer. They then see the beams of other torches and realise they are not the only ones who are at school at night.

The next day, they investigate Miss Tennyson's car and find a blood stain in it, leading them to believe they have solved the case. They confront her and make her promise to go to the police. However, at Prayers on Monday, Miss Griffin announces that Miss Tennyson has died following an accident. Hazel believes it is suicide, however Daisy thinks Miss Tennyson had an accomplice who had murdered her. They find out from a policeman that a note was found beside her corpse, saying she was sorry. He tells them that she was visited by a woman on the night she died, who was likely her killer.

From the evidence of the lost earring, the detectives realise that Miss Griffin was Miss Bell's murderer. While discussing this discovery, Hazel and Daisy come across an old diary of former student, Verity Abraham. She is said to have committed suicide by jumping off the Gym balcony before Hazel arrived at Deepdean. This diary contains evidence that Verity was Miss Griffin's illegitimate child, and that she had been pushed off the balcony. Miss Bell had discovered this evidence and had threatened to make it public, giving Miss Griffin a motive for murder.

When Miss Griffin realises that the detectives have discovered her crime, they hand the diary to the police and are sent to the San to be kept safe. Inspector Priestley holds a denouement where he reveals several teachers' secrets, as well as who the perpetrator was.

== Reception ==
In its review, The Oxford Times praised Stevens for her "sense of place ... attention to detail, in-depth characters, authentic documents of events and, most importantly, absorbing plot". The website Crime Review called Murder Most Unladylike "an assured and capable debut",. Children's author Jo Cotterill called it "extremely well plotted", but criticized the pacing of the story. The education website Teachwire said the book is "something that is simultaneously recognisable and totally original".

It also won a 2015 Waterstones Children's Book Prize in the 5-12 Fiction category.

== Sequel and Series ==
A sequel, Arsenic For Tea, was published seven months after Murder Most Unladylike. Since the first Murder Most Unladylike book, there have been eight subsequent main series books, six extra mini-books (often referred to as "Tuck Box Sized Mysteries"), and two collection books, which both feature stories released as mini-books, as well as new stories written specifically for the collections. The first of these two collections, Cream Buns and Crime, also features a guide to detecting (also previously released), and various other non-fiction segments, narrated by both the series's characters, and Robin Stevens herself.

In 2022, a sequel series titled Ministry of Unladylike Activity was released. The Ministry of Unladylike Activity takes place in the same universe as Murder Most Unladylike but further down the timeline, during World War II. It features several Murder Most Unladylike characters as side characters, and one of the three main characters is May Wong, the younger half-sister of Hazel Wong, previously introduced in A Spoonful of Murder, and featured in two other Murder Most Unladylike books. The other two main characters are entirely new to the series.

Main Series:

- Murder Most Unladylike (2014)
- Arsenic For Tea (2015)
- First Class Murder (2015)
- Jolly Foul Play (2016)
- Mistletoe and Murder (2016)
- A Spoonful of Murder (2018)
- Death in the Spotlight (2018)
- Top Marks for Murder (2019)
- Death Sets Sail (2020)

Collection Books:

- Cream Buns and Crime (2017)
- Once Upon A Crime (2021)

Tuck-Box Sized Mysteries:

- The Case Of Lavinia's Missing Tie (2016)
- The Case Of The Deepdean Vampire (2016)
- The Case Of The Blue Violet (2016)
- The Case Of The Missing Treasure (2019)
- The Case Of The Drowned Pearl (2020)

== Adaptation ==
As of October 2025, a television adaptation was in development with StudioCanal.
