= Bog Child =

2008 historical novel by Siobhan Dowd

- Front cover of first edition
- Author: Siobhan Dowd
- Cover artist: Kamil Vojnar
- Language: English
- Genre: Children's historical novel, mystery
- Publisher: David Fickling (UK, US)
- Publication date: 9 September 2008
- Publication place: United Kingdom
- Media type: Print (hardcover & paperback)
- Pages: 321 pp (first edition)
- ISBN: 978-0-385-61431-3
- OCLC: 759682319
- LC Class: PZ7.D7538 Bog 2008

Bog Child is a historical novel by Siobhan Dowd published by David Fickling (UK) and Random House Children's Books (US) on 9 September 2008, more than a year after her death. Set in the 1980s amid the backdrop of the Troubles of Northern Ireland, it features an 18-year-old boy who must study for exams but experiences "his imprisoned brother's hunger strike, the stress of being a courier for the provisional IRA, and dreams of a murdered girl whose body he discovered in a bog." In flashback and dream there are elements of the murdered girl's prehistoric or protohistoric life and death.

Dowd and Bog Child were named winners of the annual Carnegie Medal, recognising the year's best children's book published in the U.K.

== Plot summary ==
The novel is set in the 1980s. Fergus McCann and Uncle Tally find a bog body of a small girl near the Ireland-UK border. At the same time, Fergus is studying for his A-levels. He makes friends with Owain, one of the border guards, during one of his morning runs across the border. He opens many conversations with Owain when he goes back to the site of the bog child, Fergus meets Cora and Felicity O'Brien, a girl his age and her archaeologist mother. Fergus named the bog body "Mel". He goes to Long Kesh prison with his mother to meet his brother, Joey, who has been incarcerated as a prisoner because of his involvement with the Irish Republican Army.

He has joined his friends on a hunger strike. After lifting Mel's body from the site, the excavation team, including Fergus and Cora, find that Mel has a noose around her neck. A flashback shows Mel and her family struggling to meet loan repayments. Fergus was asked by Michael Rafters to ferry packets across the border in an attempt to end his brother's hunger strike. Fergus and Cora share their accidental first kiss but begin dating afterwards. After his final A-level exam, physics, Fergus and his family visit his brother in prison to find him gaunt-looking. He gets drunk and dreams about Mel talking to Rur, her love interest. When he wakes up, Cora informs him that Mel was a dwarf. Fergus allows Cora and her mother to stay over at his place due to an appointment with a professor about Mel.

Radiocarbon dating reveals that Mel lived around AD 80. After a bombing is shown on the news, Fergus begins to suspect the packets he has been ferrying. He opens them in front of Owain to see condoms and contraceptive pills. Joe falls into a coma after 50 days of fasting. After a heated argument between Fergus and his parents they agree to put him on the drip. Through a series of dreams, Fergus sees the events leading to Mel's death with Rur stabbing her at her request because she did not want to "feel the noose" around her neck. It is also found out at the end that Fergus' Uncle Tally actually is a local bomb-maker, nicknamed Deus, meaning god, and was killed after resisting arrest. Right after this Fergus went off to medicine school to complete his studies.

== Inspiration ==
Dowd says that her inspiration for the book was the 1981 Irish hunger strike. She says that BBC's Timewatch was an "inspirational programme on recent discoveries of bog people in Ireland". She also mentions "the classic The Bog People: Iron Age Man Preserved by P. V. Glob" in the same context.

== Reception ==
Bog Child received many accolades:

- 2008, Amazon.com, Best Books of 2008
- 2008, Guardian Award longlist
- 2008, Publishers Weekly, Best Book of the Year for children's fiction
- 2008, Kirkus Reviews, one of the best young adult books of the year
- 2009, Carnegie Medal winner
- 2009, Edgar Award nominee
- 2009, Manchester Book Award Nominee for Longlist
- 2010, Rhode Island Teen Book Award nominee
- Bisto Book of the Year winner
- Bisto Merit Awards winner

In review for The Guardian, Meg Rosoff commends Dowd for being "incapable of a jarring phrase or a lazy metaphor. Her sentences sing; each note resonates with an urgent humanity of the sort that cannot be faked." Nicolette Jones from The Times comments that the book is "psychologically and historically convincing, showing the impact of politics on domestic life". BookTrust Children's Books commends Fergus for being "an immensely likeable character whose story, along with that of the bog child, will long stay with those who read it". In retrospect Rosoff observed, "it is, for me, clearly a book written by a dying woman. ... [about] how her voice comes back from beyond the grave."

== Translations ==
- French: La parole de Fergus, lit. 'Fergus' Words'. Translated by Cécile Dutheil de la Rochère. Paris: Gallimard Jeunesse. 2009. ISBN 9782070620968.
- German: Anfang und Ende allen Kummers ist dieser Ort, lit. 'This Place is the Beginning and End of All Sorrow'. Translated by Salah Naoura. Hamburg: Carlsen Verlag. 2009. ISBN 9783551582089.
- Dutch: Het moerasmeisje. Translated by Tjalling Bos. Buren: Van Goor. 2011. ISBN 9047509226.
- Italian: La bambina dimenticata dal tempo, lit. 'The Little Girl Forgotten By Time'. Translated by Sante Bandirali. Crema: Uovonero. 2012. ISBN 9788896918166.
- Bulgarian: Блатно дете, romanized: Blatno dete. Translated by Aleksandar Hristov. Sofia: Artline. 2016. ISBN 9786191930678.
- Estonian: Laps, kelle aeg unustas, lit. 'The Child Whom Time Forgot'. Translated by Triin Olvet. Tallinn: Ajakirjade Kirjastus. 2016. ISBN 9789949392087.
- Persian: کودک باتلاق. Translated by Bita Ebrahimi. Tehran: Peydayesh. 2016. ISBN 9786002964090.

== See also ==
Awards
Preceded by Here Lies Arthur	Carnegie Medal recipient 2009	Succeeded by The Graveyard Book
