= Arsenic for Tea =

2015 book by Robin Stevens

- British edition cover
- Author: Robin Stevens
- Cover artist: Nina Tara
- Language: English
- Genre: Mystery, Children's
- Publisher: Corgi, Puffin Books
- Publication date: 29 January 2015
- Publication place: United Kingdom
- Pages: 352
- Preceded by: Murder Most Unladylike
- Followed by: First Class Murder

Arsenic for Tea is a children's mystery novel by American-English author Robin Stevens, published by Puffin Books. It is the second instalment in the Murder Most Unladylike series. The story is written in the style of a casebook, as the Detective Society try to solve the murder of a guest at a birthday party.

Arsenic for Tea was nominated for several awards, including the 2016 Carnegie Medal, but did not make the longlist.

== Plot ==
Arriving at Fallingford House, Daisy's home, from their Easter term at Deepdean, they enter the house in the middle of an argument between Lord and Lady Hastings (Daisy's parents). Other people staying in the house include Bertie (Daisy's brother), Stephen Bampton (Bertie's best friend), and Miss Alston (Daisy and Hazel's governess and secretary to Lord Hastings).

Daisy will turn 14 during the holidays, so a party is planned. The guests are: Denis Curtis, antiques dealer and guest of Lady Hastings; Felix Mountfitchet, Daisy's uncle and brother to Lady Hastings; Saskia Wells, aunt to Lord Hastings and great-aunt to Daisy; Katherine 'Kitty' Freebody; and Rebecca 'Beanie' Martineau, Daisy and Hazel's friends from Deepdean. Daisy then overhears Curtis say 'Ming' to himself at a pot before claiming at dinner that it was not Ming. He also claims various items in the house are worthless. Daisy, while playing a game of hide and seek, then tells Hazel that they are going downstairs to spy on Mr. Curtis, as she thinks he is highly suspicious. During their mission, they discover Uncle Felix speaking to Mr. Curtis and Uncle Felix greeting Miss Alston as if they know and dislike each other. Mr. Curtis then kisses Lady Hastings later that evening, upsetting Daisy. Bertie and Uncle Felix then burst in and yell at Mr. Curtis.

The next morning, they see Lord Hastings demand that Mr. Curtis leave by that evening. They also see Miss Alston spying on Mr. Curtis, and later that day, there is an argument between Uncle Felix and Mr. Curtis, and Lady Hastings goes to speak to Mr. Curtis. Later that day, whilst playing Sardines, Stephen finds Hazel and admits he is poor, and together they accidentally overhear Mr. Curtis say to bring certain things, including jewels and paintings, to Lady Hastings.

At tea, Lady Hastings asks for someone to give Mr. Curtis some tea, and Lord Hastings is very eager to give him some. Mr. Curtis then has a coughing fit and retreats to his room. Later that evening, Miss Alston tells them that Mr. Curtis has died and that the doctor will be summoned. Daisy and Hazel, using the spare key, as Uncle Felix has taken custody of the main dining room key, enter the dining room early in the morning to recover the cup full of Arsenic, entering easily when they see the door unlocked, even though they were sure Uncle Felix locked the door. Hazel picks up a piece of paper in the dining room. The cup and Mr. Curtis' watch are gone. Something then rustles at the other end of the room, presumably the murderer, and they flee.

Later that morning, Lady Hastings announces she is going to call the police. Aunt Saskia and Bertie then try to stop her, with Bertie saying that Mr. Curtis died from food poisoning. Lady Hastings then reveals that Uncle Felix does not think this is food poisoning. Lord Hastings says that their road is flooded and that they are unable to leave the house. Uncle Felix then says it was dysentery, which was why he didn't think it was food poisoning, and Lady Hastings then suggests that it was murder. However, Lady Hastings is unable to call the police due to the roads being flooded and the connection not working.

Upstairs, Kitty reveals she and Beanie know about the Detective Society, and Daisy reluctantly lets them join. The four then make their first suspect list, with Miss Alston, Bertie, Lord and Lady Hastings, Uncle Felix and Aunt Saskia, and Stephen all on the list.

They then search Miss Alston's room, where Daisy realizes that Miss Alston is a cover identity and that she is not a real person. She was meant to arrest Denis Curtis on the orders of a man named M, which was Uncle Felix. They then walk downstairs, hunting for Miss Alston's references for when she applied to be governess. However, Beanie has found a notebook that incriminates Mr. Curtis as a thief and says that he was planning to steal from Fallingford. Heading downstairs, they see Uncle Felix, Aunt Saskia, and Bertie try to stop Lady Hastings from calling the police.

Going to Lord Hastings' study, Hazel finds the papers that 'Miss Alston' used to apply for governess. The four find and read them. The letter of application says that she has come from the 'Reputable Agency' and is newly registered, but has worked in important places before registering with the 'Reputable Agency'. The four then realise that, due to the signatures, the references are fake. Chapman, the butler, then acts very oddly. He thinks that Lord Hastings, the man who has given Mr. Curtis tea, is responsible.

== Reception ==
In its review, The Daily Mail praises Arsenic for Tea as a sequel that “stands alone and is a delight”, and lauds Robin Stevens for how her “Agatha Christie-like clues are unravelled with sustained tension”.

Arsenic for Tea was nominated for the 2016 Carnegie Medal and shortlisted for the 2014 North East Book Award.
