= The London Eye Mystery =

2007 young adult mystery novel

- First edition cover
- Author: Siobhan Dowd
- Language: English
- Genre: Children's mystery novel
- Publisher: David Fickling Books
- Publication date: 2007
- Publication place: United Kingdom
- Media type: Print (hardback and paperback)
- Pages: 336 pp
- ISBN: 978-0-385-61266-1
- OCLC: 84996178

The London Eye Mystery is a 2007 children's mystery novel by English author Siobhan Dowd. It tells the story of how Ted, a boy with Autism (then referred to as Asperger's), and his sister Kat solve the mystery of how their cousin, Salim, seemingly vanishes from inside a sealed capsule on the London Eye. In 2017, Robin Stevens published a sequel, The Guggenheim Mystery.

== Plot summary ==
The story begins with Aunt Gloria visiting Ted's family. Ted is a boy with Asperger syndrome; his brain is described as running "on its own unique operating system". Aunt Gloria is accompanied by her son Salim, who is of Asian heritage and is about a year older than Ted. People with Asperger syndrome often display intense interests; Ted has an interest in the weather.

Salim is especially captivated by the old Barracks building, which is on the same street as Ted's house. The next day Salim, Ted, and his older sister Kat decide to take a ride on the London Eye, noting the hour-long queues. A stranger approaches them with a ticket for the Eye, saying he is afraid of small spaces and cannot ride it. They decide to give the ticket to Salim, as he has never been on the Eye before. Salim waves towards his cousins as he boards. Half an hour later, when Salim's capsule lands, Kat and Ted find Salim missing.

When Aunt Gloria and Ted's mother find out about this, they become angry with Kat for allowing Salim to take a ticket from a stranger. That evening, Ted and Kat check Salim's camera and have the film developed in case it holds clues. The family then receives a phone call from the police, saying that a boy matching Salim's description has been found dead. Ted's father decides to go and verify the body, but it is not Salim. The next day, Kat, Ted, and their father visit the chemist to have the photographs developed. They then ride the Eye to see if there was any way that Salim could have hidden in the capsule or avoided getting out, but find no clues.

When they arrive home, Ted and Kat examine the newly developed photographs and find only one clue: that the stranger who gave them the ticket is in the background of one of the photographs, in a T-shirt with the letters "ONTLI ECUR" on it. They soon decipher that some of the letters are missing, and the writing actually says 'FRONTLINE SECURITY', a security company which is currently working at a local motorbike exhibition. Kat goes to the exhibition, and Ted soon works out where she has gone and follows her. They soon find the stranger who sold them the ticket, but he avoids their questions and denies any connection with Salim's disappearance.

Piecing together all the information he and Kat have uncovered, Ted figures out how Salim may have left the London Eye without being noticed and immediately calls the police. The police arrive with Marcus Flood, a friend of Salim, who helped him escape. Marcus had bought two tickets for the same capsule, using one himself and convincing his brother to pose as a claustrophobic man who would give his ticket to Salim, pretending not to know him. Salim, who knew the plan, pretended not to know Marcus' brother and entered the same capsule as Marcus, who was dressed as a teenage girl. When the others in the capsule lined up for the souvenir photo, Salim and Marcus swapped outfits. However, there was a jacket sleeve visible in one of the pictures, and that was how Ted worked out that the girl who left the pod was, in fact, Salim. Once they left the capsule, Salim and Marcus spent the day together but separated at Euston Underground station. That was the last time that Marcus saw Salim. Ted deduces that Salim is in the old barracks because he showed such a fascination with it the day that he arrived. Eventually, they find Salim in the old barracks building, which is due to be demolished the next day. He had been trapped there, alone, for three days. Salim did not enjoy living with his mother, and she was the reason he wanted to run away. Salim apologises, and ultimately agrees to fly to New York with his mother, Aunt Gloria, to try it out for six months.

== Awards and nominations ==
The London Eye Mystery won several awards, including the Book sens Children's Pick List Award 2008, the School Library Journal Best Books of the Year Award 2008, the Booklist Children's Editors' Choice Award 2008, the Horn Book Fanfare Award 2008, the Kirkus Reviews Best Children's Books Award and the Book Links Lasting Connection Award 2008. It is available in ten languages: Dutch, English, French, German, Greek, Hungarian, Indonesian, Italian, Korean, and Spanish.
