= Mial Pagan =

British author and playwright

Michael 'Mial' Gerard Pagan (born 28 May 1956, Belfast), who writes under the names Mial Pagan and Michael McDonnell, is a British author and playwright.

== Early life and education ==
Michael Gerard Pagan was born 28 May 1956 in Belfast.

He graduated from St. MacNissi's College, Garron Tower in 1974. He then moved to England and studied for a degree in drama, English Literature, and French at Manchester University, graduating in 1980. In 1997, he studied for a Master of Business Administration in management and technology at the Open University.

== Career ==
=== Theatre ===
After graduating from university in 1980, he moved to London where he appeared in a number of productions, including in Eugène Ionesco's Rhinoceros' at the Croydon Warehouse Theatre. He was a member of the Company of Ten theatrical group and appeared with them in Translations by Brian Friel, A Streetcar Named Desire, and God Only Knows by Hugh Whitemore. He worked as a drama therapist in hospitals and day centres around London.

Pagan later began writing plays. He wrote the screenplay for the film Paradise Place (2013), a comedy about a soldier returning from duty in Afghanistan who finds that the street where he lived no longer exists. His play The Old Fighting Cocks was recorded by The Company of Ten in association with Radio Verulam in 2018. It tells the story of local soldiers joining up to fight in the First World War.

Pagan's plays have been produced at the Abbey Theatre, St Albans: Other People's Lives (2010), Dancehall Sweethearts (2017), and National Trust (2021). His play "Thin Places" was performed as part of the Camden Fringe festival in 2024; set in a village in Northern Ireland, the play explores the return of an exile to his home.

=== Information technology ===
In 1988, Pagan started working in information technology (IT) for KPOS Computer Systems in Brentford. From 1990, he worked in IT management for various companies: over three years at Zenith Media and over five years at Carat UK. He worked for advertising agencies writing articles for business magazines. In 2002, he set up The Pagan Consultancy. He wrote business books in the Teach Yourself series for Hodder Education.

=== Novelist ===
Pagan's novel The Agency, formerly called Eat More Bloody Meat Y'Bastards!, is a satire based on his experience of office life in the advertising industry.

Using the pen name Michael McDonnell, Pagan wrote the Dermot O'Hara Mysteries, detective stories set in Kenmare, County Kerry.

Since 2008 he has worked as a freelance writer at the publisher Hodder and Stoughton.

== Personal life ==
In 1987, Pagan married English author and human rights activist Siobhan Dowd (1960–2007) in Lambeth; they separated in the early 1990s. In 1996, he married Alison McNaught (born 1961, Wirral) at Aylesbury Vale. He has lived in St Albans, Hertfordshire since 1997.

== Publications ==
=== As Mial Pagan ===
- Manage Your IT for Profit (Teach Yourself) (2010)
- Other People's Lives (2012)
- Eat More Bloody Meat Y'Bastards! (2014) later renamed The Agency
- Short Cuts: Three short stories (2015)
- The Old Fighting Cocks (2016)
- Dancehall Sweethearts (2018)
- National Trust (2022)

=== As Michael McDonnell ===
The Dermot O'Hara Mysteries

- Thicker Than Water (2012)
- Banshee (2013)
- The Loneliest Man In The World (2016)
