= Democracies (book) =

1984 book by Arend Lijphart

Democracies: Patterns of Majoritarian and Consensus Government in Twenty-one Countries
- Author: Arend Lijphart
- Language: English
- Subject: Democracy; comparative politics
- Published: 1984
- Publication place: United States
- Media type: Print
- Pages: 229
- ISBN: 978-0-300-03182-9

Democracies: Patterns of Majoritarian and Consensus Government in Twenty-one Countries is a work of comparative politics by the political scientist Arend Lijphart. The book was first published in 1984 by Yale University Press.
