= Plural society =

A plural society is defined by Fredrik Barth as a society combining ethnic contrasts: the economic interdependence of those groups, and their ecological specialization (i.e., use of different environmental resources by each ethnic group). The ecological interdependence, or the lack of competition, between ethnic groups may be based on the different activities in the same region or on long–term occupation of different regions in the Defined by J S Furnivall as a medley of peoples - European, Chinese, Indian and native, who do mix but do not combine. Each group holds by its own religion, its own culture and language, its own ideas and ways. As individuals they meet, but only in the marketplace in buying and selling. There is a plural society, with different sections of the community living side by side, within the same political unit.

== Democratic stability in plural societies ==
Democracy in plural societies involves political affiliations that strongly correlate with social cleavages. For example, multiple ethnic groups may each largely vote for ethnonationalist political parties, like Bosnia and Herzegovina.

Plural democracies may be stable or unstable. According to Gabriel A. Almond, 'Continental European' plural democracies were inherently unstable due to the centrifugal forces of conflicting segmental interests, unlike homogeneous and majoritarian Anglo-American systems. This typification was challenged by Arend Lijphart's study of deviant cases in the Netherlands, Austria, Switzerland, and Belgium, each representing a plural yet stable democracy.

Duverger and Neumann argue that there is a close relationship between the number of parties and democratic stability, but a two party system not only seems to correspond to the nature of things because it can moderate better than multiparty systems. In other words, a two party system is the best aggregation. In Switzerland, there is a multiparty system, while in Austria, there is a two party system.

Arend Lijphart says that there are deep divisions between different segments of the population and absence of a unifying consensus in most of the Asian, African and South American countries like Guyana, Surinam and Trinidad. According to Cliffard Geertz, Communal attachment is called “primordial loyalties”, which may be based on language, religion, custom, region, race or assumed blood ties. Each communal group hold its assumed ties, therefore there is political instability and breakdown of democracy up until now.

He argues that due to political development, western countries have created homogeneity among their plural societies, as idealized British society. But Gabriel Almond says that, in the Continental European political system, there is no secularism and political homogeneity, but there is cultural homogeneity. He argues that non-western countries become more comprehensive and less remote when they use this continental type, which is based on a multi-racial (multi-national) society and lacks strong consensus.

Furnivall states that democracy is achieved by European countries with the help of Consociationalism, and that there is fulfillment of the requirements and demands of the divided societies through appropriate processes. On the other hand, in non-western countries, there is lack of strength in social will and social unity due to the divided society, and, it is dangerous for both the democracy and political unity.

== Consociational democracy and the segments of plural society ==
The concept of a plural society is central to consociational theory. The utility of consociational democracy is premised on the existence of multiple communal segments with non-overlapping social cleavages, each led by segmental elites. Power-sharing between communities in a plural society is then predicted to benefit from consociational institutions, like segmental vetoes, proportional representation, segmental autonomy, and grand coalitions.

== See also ==
- Ethnic group
- Multiculturalism
- Polyethnicity
- Pluralism (disambiguation)
