= St Killian's College =

St. Killian's College
- Coláiste Naomh Cillian
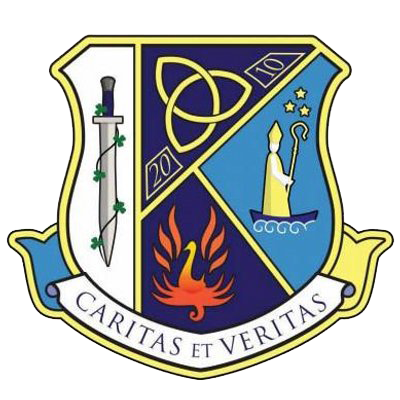

Location
- Carnlough; County Antrim, BT44 0JS; Northern Ireland; 55.043°N 5.968°W

Information
- Other name: Garron Tower
- Type: All-ability, co-educational, 11-18 school
- Motto: Caritas et Veritas (Love and Truth)
- Head of school: Bernie Hockey (Interim)
- Enrollment: 830
- Colours: Blue and yellow
- Website: www.stkillianscollege.co.uk

St Killian's College (Irish: Coláiste Naomh Cillian, also known colloquially as Garron Tower) is a secondary school located in the Glens of Antrim area of Northern Ireland.

Garron Tower was built circa 1850 as a summer residence for Frances, Marchioness of Londonderry. It was converted into St MacNissi's College, a college for educating Catholic boys, in 1951. The current incarnation of the school, resulting from the amalgamation of St MacNissi's College with nearby colleges, emerged in 2010 after a series of reforms by the Council for Catholic Maintained Schools (CCMS).

The school is regularly listed as one of the top performing schools in Northern Ireland and ranked 5th in the A-Level table in the 2019 year.

Historically a grammar school, the school became an all-abilities school in 2010 and was renamed St Killian's College after the CCMS announced it would be focusing on transforming every school to all-abilities.

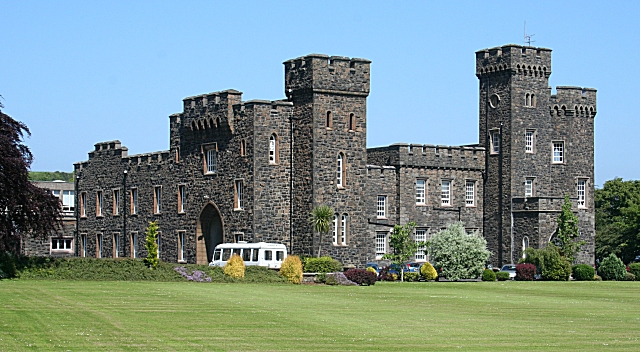
St Killian's College, site formerly known as St MacNissi's College, Garron Tower

== History ==
The college's building history predates the school by over 100 years. Garron Tower was built in 1850 at a cost of £4,000 as a summer residence for Frances, Marchioness of Londonderry (1800-1865), the wealthy wife of the 3rd Marquess of Londonderry. She had inherited this part of the Antrim family's estates from her mother, Anne Katherine MacDonnell, Countess of Antrim, who married Sir Henry Vane-Tempest of County Durham.

The college was founded as St MacNissi's College, in 1951 as a boarding school for boys. The buildings were acquired a year earlier in 1950 by Bishop Daniel Mageean for use as a boarding school for boys. The school opened in September 1951.

On 1 April 2010, the Council for Catholic Maintained Schools (CCMS) amalgamated St MacNissi's College with two other schools, St Comgall's College and St Aloysius' High School, both located in the Antrim Coast Road area. As part of this amalgamation the college was renamed St Killian's and became an all-ability school.

== Buildings ==
The college grounds are situated on a plateau approximately 200 feet (61 m) above the Antrim Coast Road (part of the A2) at Garron Point, overlooking the North Channel and out towards the Mull of Kintyre, Scotland.

The grounds include a golf course, several sports pitches, a wooded forest, several gardens and a seawall.

The college's main building contains the priests' dining-room, priests' sitting-room, 100 desk study-hall, kitchens, cloakrooms, first-aid room, classrooms, offices, and a food-storage area. A number of artworks, including by local artists such as Charles McAuley and Sam McLarnon, hang in this old section of the school.

A chapel was built in 1955 and a 150-room boarding department (now empty) was opened in 1956. On the canopy above the High Altar are the words "Laudate Pueri Dominum" which translates as "Boys, Praise the Lord". On one of the stained glass windows, installed in 1956, is a note in small print: "As I am making this window the Hungarians have risen in revolt against Communist/Russian rule in Hungary. October 1956". A set of stables, subsequently converted to dormitories, now house music, languages and business studies classrooms.

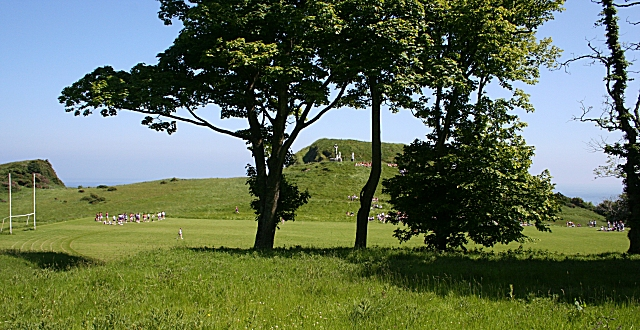
Sports day, 2007

A block used for IT, home economics, art and science is situated on the site of the old tennis courts. There is also a small golf course. At the north end, there are four sports pitches and a set of hand-ball alleys. Behind the squash courts, there is an outdoor basketball court.

A 150-room boarding department (now empty) was opened in 1956. Called St Mary's Residence, single rooms made up the majority of this building, but at the front ends there were double rooms, six in total, two on each floor, which were occupied by the college priests and latterly by brothers or prefects supervising the floors.

Original stables were the open dormitories of Ardclinis, Trostan, and Knocklayde. On the level above the Ardclinis Dormitory were the rooms of three priests. These old stables now house music, languages, and business studies classrooms. The building is known as St Joseph's.

== Architectural features ==
The seaward wall of the school has seven cannons facing the sea which are of naval origin from the Napoleonic wars.

Towards the northern end of the sea-wall, there was a gate, lending access to a twisting path down to the Coast Road but the end of this path, where it met the Coast Road, was out-of-bounds. Just across the road and about 50 yards to the north, the Garron Point Post Office was located and the journey between the gate at the Coast Road and the post office was fraught with danger. About 400 yards north of the post office, at the bottom of Dunmaul Hill, is a "water driven" pump house where - in March 1956 - a boarder at the college died.

== Sports facilities ==
The tennis courts were situated in a small field which in the 1950s and early 1960s was called the "Wee Field". A £1.6 million block for IT, Home Economics, Art, and Science was built on the site of the old tennis courts. At the south end of the college grounds there is a wooded area in which the original owner's dog, Urisk, is buried. The headstone remains and on it is written:

"Here Urisk lies and let the truth be told, This faithful dog was blind, infirm and old. Deaf to all else his mistress' voice he knew, Blind though he was, his step to her was true. So strong an instinct by affection fed, Endured till Urisk's vital spirit fled. Stoop grandeur from thy throne ye sons of pride, To whom no want is known, nor wish denied. A moment pause, and blush, if blush you can, To find in dogs more virtue than in man. And share, "midst all your luxury and pelf", one thought for others out of ten for self'".

At the north end there are four sports pitches and a set of hand-ball alleys (1 closed, 1 semi-closed and 1 open), all of which are the 60 × 40 type of alley. Behind the squash courts there is a new outdoor basketball court.

== Academics ==
The school curriculum covers: Key Stage 3 (Years 8, 9 and 10) - located in the main school building, Key Stage 4 (Years 11 and 12) and Sixth Form (Years 13 and 14).

In 2018, 69% of its entrants achieved five or more GCSEs at grades A* to C, including the core subjects English and Maths.

In 2019 the school was ranked 5th out of 159 secondary schools in Northern Ireland with 92.0% of its A-level students who entered the exams in 2017/18 being awarded three A*-C grades.

== Alumni ==
=== St Killian's College ===
- Danny Donnelly - Alliance Party Member of the Legislative Assembly (MLA)
- Patricia O'Lynn (born 1990) - academic and Alliance Party Member of the Legislative Assembly (MLA)

=== St MacNissi's College ===
- Derek Davis – Irish broadcaster
- Conleth Hill – film, stage and television actor
- Fr Eugene O'Hagan - 1971 to 1978 Chancellor & Vicar General of the Diocese
- Brendan O'Leary – political scientist
- Sir Gerald McAlinden - 1974 to 1981. Serving High Court Judge in Northern Ireland and President of the Victims' Payments Board.
- John McGarry – political scientist
- Declan O'Loan – SDLP politician
- Alasdair McDonnell – Member of Parliament for Belfast South (SDLP)
- Alan McGuckian SJ Bishop of Raphoe 2017 - 2024. Bishop of Down and Connor 2024–present.
- Donal McKeown – Bishop of Derry
- Michael Gerard Pagan – author and playwright.
- The Priests Fr Eugene O'Hagan (VG & Diocesan Chancellor) 1971 to 1978 & Fr David Delargy (PP Loughshore Parishes), Fr Martin O’Hagan (PP St Anne’s & Derriaghy) 1974 to 1981: Unbroken Guinness Book of Records for fastest selling debut classical act in the UK with Epic / Sony release of their 1st album in 2008.
