= Rupert Taylor =

South african professor

- Born: Brighton, England
- Occupation: Political Sociologist
- Notable work: Taylor, Rupert (2024). Systemic Racism in South Africa: Humanity Lost (1st ed.). Singapore: Springer Nature Singapore. p. 321. ISBN 978-9819785285.

Rupert Taylor is a professor of political studies and former head of the Department of Political Studies at the University of the Witwatersrand, Johannesburg, from 1987 to 2013. Rupert Taylor is best known as a political sociologist and academic researcher specializing in ethnic conflict, political violence, and consociationalism. He has published widely about South African politics and the Northern Ireland conflict. Taylor's academic work demonstrates intellectual independence and a commitment to critical inquiry.

== Education and career ==
He was educated at the progressive independent Dartington Hall School in England, then North Devon College (Barnstaple), and completed a BA degree in politics and government at the University of Kent in 1980, followed by an MSc(Econ) in political sociology at the London School of Economics (1981) and a PhD in sociology at Kent, (1986).

He was formerly a visiting research fellow in the Department of Political Science at the New School for Social Research in New York City, adjunct professor in the Department of Political Science at Columbia University and a visiting research fellow in the School of Politics, Queen's University Belfast.

His publications include articles in African Affairs, Ethnic and Racial Studies, Peace and Change, The Political Quarterly, Race and Class, The Round Table, and Telos. He was editor of Politikon and Voluntas: International Journal of Voluntary and Nonprofit Organizations.

In 2001 Taylor was appointed editor-in-chief of the ISTR journal Voluntas: International Journal of Voluntary and Nonprofit Organizations - a position he held for six years.

Taylor was placed on special leave by Wits University in 2013 following allegations of sexual harassment, which he disputed, and was subsequently dismissed from his position. He was subsequently appointed as a research associate at the University of Johannesburg.

== Research ==
Taylor's research interests include political violence, transitions to democracy and non-governmental organisations. He has written widely about South African politics and the Northern Ireland conflict. He has been critical of consociationalism as a strategy of conflict management.

Whilst at the New School for Social Research in New York (1993–94), Taylor developed a critique of how political science has addressed issues of race and ethnicity. He elaborated on this theory in the chapter "Northern Ireland: Consociation or Social Transformation", published in Northern Ireland and the Divided World (Oxford University Press, 2001), edited by John McGarry.

Taylor’s critique of consociationalism has been cited in academic discussions of the Northern Ireland conflict and the South African transition from apartheid. His perspective was further developed in the edited volume Consociational Theory (Routledge, 2009). More recently, along with Timofey Agarin, Taylor has edited "Consociational Power-Sharing in Northern Ireland: Uncertain Stability" (Routledge, 2025).

Taylor critiques consociational power-sharing in Northern Ireland, by arguing that it does not effectively address underlying sectarian divisions. He contends that the liberal consociational model, as proposed by John McGarry and Brendan O’Leary, reinforces ethnic divisions rather than resolving them. Taylor highlights that consociationalism tends to institutionalize sectarian identities, binding communities into rigid groups and perpetuating socio-economic inequalities, particularly between Catholic and Protestant people. His critique suggests that while consociational arrangements may reduce violence, they fail to dismantle the structural inequalities that contribute to conflict. He points to socio-economic deprivation as a key issue, arguing that consociationalism does not sufficiently address disparities in rights, opportunities, and resources. Furthermore, Taylor has argued that sectarianism in Northern Ireland is more than just a legacy of past conflict, that it is a deeply embedded system that works to reproduce inequality and social injustice. This is termed "systemic sectarianism."

Taylor also contributed to a two-year international study on peace and conflict organizations in Northern Ireland, Israel/Palestine, and South Africa.

Rupert Taylor edited Third Sector Research (Springer, 2010), which offers a comprehensive international overview of third sector scholarship. According to Marc Jegers, "this book presents a plethora of challenging and sometimes critical thoughts, which should inspire all kinds of third sector researchers to refine and advance third sector knowledge."

Rupert Taylor has also explored systemic racism in South Africa, analyzing how exclusionary social mechanisms have shaped the country's political and legal structures. His book "Systemic Racism in South Africa: Humanity Lost" (Springer, 2024) examines how racism persists across different political eras, from segregation to apartheid to liberal democracy. The book takes a critical macro-level political sociological perspective on South African society. He applies systemic racism theory to argue that South Africa's social structures have maintained a systemically racist form, deeply compromising truth and justice. Taylor contends that racism is embedded in South Africa's societal framework, spanning segregationism, apartheid, and liberal democracy. He critiques the limits of the rule of law in a racist society and explores why the national liberation struggle has failed to deliver on its promise of a "better life for all". His argument is supported by over thirty interviews with South African politicians, jurists, and intellectuals, as well as Truth and Reconciliation Commission transcripts, including classified ones.

== Selected publications ==
- Taylor, Rupert (2024). Systemic Racism in South Africa: Humanity Lost (1st ed.). Singapore: Springer Nature Singapore. p. 321. doi:10.1007/978-981-97-8529-2. ISBN 978-9819785285.
- Taylor, Rupert (ed.) (2009). Consociational Theory: McGarry and O’Leary and the Northern Ireland conflict (1st ed.). Routledge. https://doi.org/10.4324/9780203962565
- Taylor, Rupert (2006), The Belfast Agreement and the Politics of Consociationalism: A Critique. The Political Quarterly, 77: 217-226. https://doi.org/10.1111/j.1467-923X.2006.00764.x
- Taylor, Rupert, 'South Africa: The Role of Peace and Conflict‐Resolution Organizations in the Struggle Against Apartheid', in Benjamin Gidron, Stanley N. Katz, and Yeheskel Hasenfeld (eds), Mobilizing for Peace: Conflict Resolution in Northern Ireland, South Africa, and Israel/Palestine (New York, 2002; online edn, Oxford Academic, 1 Nov. 2003), https://doi.org/10.1093/0195125924.003.0004
- Taylor, Rupert. Justice denied: political violence in Kwazulu‐Natal after 1994, African Affairs, Volume 101, Issue 405, 1 October 2002, Pages 473–508, https://doi.org/10.1093/afraf/101.405.473
- Rupert Taylor, "South Africa: Consociation or Democracy? ”. Telos 85 (Fall 1990). New York: Telos Press.
- "South Africa: Anti-Apartheid NGOs in Transition" Adam Habib and Rupert Taylor, Voluntas, 1999, Vol. 10, No. 1
- Taylor, Rupert. Interpreting Global Civil Society. VOLUNTAS: International Journal of Voluntary and Nonprofit Organizations 13, 339–347 (2002). https://doi.org/10.1023/A:1022046125396
- Taylor, Rupert (ed.) (2010). Third Sector Research. Springer, New York. https://link.springer.com/book/10.1007/978-1-4419-5707-8
