= Power sharing =

Practice in conflict resolution

Power sharing is "a way to exercise power in which representatives of distinct constituencies are included in a power-organ and make decisions jointly." The term refers primarily to a practice of inclusivity in decision-making, for instance in coalition governments or in inclusive military power organs. However, the term "power-sharing" is often used to refer to "power-sharing institutions": constitutional or peace agreement provisions – and at times informal pacts – through which conflict parties distribute political, military, or economic power among themselves according to agreed rules.

At the state level, "power sharing is intended to hold the existing state together with the active participation and support of its minorities, unlike strategies of genocide, expulsion, partition and control". Since the end of the Cold War, power-sharing systems have become increasingly commonplace in negotiating settlements for armed conflict. Power sharing is a central component of two schools of thought on ethnic conflict management: consociationalism and centripetalism.

Alternatives to power sharing may include coercive assimilation, assimilationist strategies, integrationist strategies, accommodationist strategies, multiculturalism, territorial pluralism.

== Power-sharing practices and institutions ==
The academic literature has proposed various ways to conceptualise power-sharing. A fundamental distinction is between power-sharing practices and power-sharing institutions. Power-sharing practice refer to the de facto inclusion of conflicting groups in joint decision making organs (typically in coalition governments or power-sharing executives). Power-sharing institutions refer to the formal informal rules that mandate or require power-sharing practices.

Importantly, power-sharing practices and institutions do not always overlap: power-sharing practice often takes place without institutionalisation (for instance in temporary governments of national unity responding to crises). Moreover, power-sharing institutions appear to affect conflict resolution only through power-sharing practices. In other words, power-sharing institutions have to be implemented to matter.

== Dimensions of power sharing institutions ==
An influential way to disaggregate power-sharing institutions has been to distinguish between provisions relating to political, economic, military, or territorial power-sharing.

Political power-sharing involves rules governing the distribution of political offices and the exercise of decision-making powers. Power may be shared by guaranteeing the inclusion of all significant parties simultaneously in the governing cabinet through rules on grand coalition formation. Alternatively, it may involve sharing power by guaranteeing sequential access to political office, like a rotating premiership. Electoral systems can provide power-sharing through political proportionality, which better allows for minority groups to remain competitive and win a portion of political power through democratic elections.

Proportionality also informs economic power-sharing, as the distribution of public resources may be instituted respective to the size of communities. In neopatrimonial systems, political office may also be closely related to economic opportunity, meaning an equitable distribution of political power overlaps with economic power-sharing. even equitable distribution of political power overlaps with economic power-sharing.

== Schools of thought ==
Power-sharing is a central component in two "rival" schools of thought, promoting distinct strategies for ethnic conflict management in divided societies: consociationalism and centripetalism. Building on distinct theoretical assumptions, each theory formulates distinct policy prescriptions. Power-sharing is one of the component of the "institutional packages" prescribed by each approach. And each approach favours different types of power-sharing, guided by distinct logics of ethnic conflict management. Consociationalism favours a logic of polarisation, where each ethnic groups receives autonomous representation and the leaders of each ethnic groups ally in a post-electoral grand coalition to negotiate solutions ethnic disputes. Centripetalism favours a logic of moderation, where moderate ethnic parties ally in a pre-electoral coalition of the moderate middle to try to exclude ethnic extremists from holding power. These distinct strategies lead to distinct institutional prescriptions, with consociationalism favouring proportional voting and centripetalism preferring the alternative vote.

=== Consociationalism ===
Consociationalism is a school of thought which recommends power-sharing as one of its central prescriptions for achieving democracy in divided societies.

Consociationalism prescribes a set of institutional measures which distribute decision-making rights in order to guarantee fair and equal participation of the representatives of all main ethnic groups in decision-making; in this way it reassures minorities that their interests will be preserved.

This package consists in four elements: a grand coalition government, a proportional electoral system, mutual vetoes and group autonomies. Power-sharing is thus one of the components of this package; consequently, power-sharing and consociationalism should not be used as synonyms.

The goals of consociationalism are governmental stability, the survival of democracy, and the avoidance of violence. In a consociational state, all groups, including minorities, are represented on the political and economic stages. Supporters of consociationalism argue that it is a more realistic option in deeply divided societies than integrationist approaches to conflict management.

=== Centripetalism ===
Centripetalism is an alternative school of thoughts with developed out of the criticism of consociationalism by Donald L.Horowitz and formulates different institutional prescriptions for democracy in divided societies. Centripetalism aims to encourage the parties towards moderate and compromising policies and to reinforce the centre of the divided political spectrum. The main institutional prescription of centripetalists is preferential voting systems such as the alternative vote, that let voters indicating various sequential preferences instead of voting for one candidate. These electoral systems are argued to promote moderation by giving incentives to moderate ethnic parties to ally across ethnic lines and "pool votes", in order to win elections against more radical forces. This moderation – which does not amount to a depoliticisation of a disappearance of ethnicity – delivers more cohesive coalitions in which elite cooperation may be more achievable than in grand coalitions. However, some scholars have argued that such coalitions are inherently unstable as they are constantly threatened by radical factions on their flanks.

== Power-sharing after civil wars ==
Research by Killian Clarke, Anne Meng and Jack Paine, which examined all rebellions that overthrew a government since 1900, found that unified rebellions (with one major group taking power) tended to build lasting governments. Rebel governments formed through a coalition of rebel groups tended to produce short-lived governments, as coalition partners might renege on agreements, leading the country back into civil war. Proportional representations and parliamentary systems tend to increase stability, while winner-take-all systems reduce stability.

== Examples ==
Examples of power sharing include the Peace of Augsburg, the Peace of Westphalia, and the Good Friday Agreement of 1998 in Northern Ireland.

Examples of consociational power sharing include the Netherlands (1917–1967), Belgium since 1918, and Lebanon since 1943.

Examples of centripetal power sharing include Fiji (1999–2006), Northern Ireland (June 1973 – May 1974), Papua New Guinea, Sri Lanka, Indonesia, Kenya and Nigeria.

== See also ==
- Comparative politics
- Peace and conflict studies
- Peaceful transition of power
