= Consociationalism =

Political power sharing among cultural groups

Consociationalism (/kənˌsoʊʃiˈeɪʃənəlɪzəm/ kən-SOH-shee-AY-shən-əl-iz-əm) is a form of democratic power sharing. Political scientists define a consociational state as one which has major internal divisions along ethnic, religious, or linguistic lines, but which remains stable due to consultation among the elites of these groups. Consociational states are often contrasted with states with majoritarian electoral systems.

The goals of consociationalism are governmental stability, the survival of the power-sharing arrangements, the survival of democracy, and the avoidance of violence. When consociationalism is organised along religious confessional lines, as in Lebanon, it is known as confessionalism. Consociationalism is sometimes seen as analogous to corporatism, and some scholars consider consociationalism a form of corporatism. Others claim that economic corporatism was designed to regulate class conflict, while consociationalism developed on the basis of reconciling societal fragmentation along ethnic and religious lines.

Concurrent majority can be a precursor to consociationalism. A consociational democracy differs from consensus democracy (e.g. in Switzerland), in that consociational democracy represents a consensus of representatives with minority veto, while consensus democracy requires consensus across the electorate. The idea has received significant criticism in its applicability to democratic political systems, especially with regard to power-sharing.

== Origins ==
Consociation was first discussed in the 17th century New England Confederation. It described the interassociation and cooperation of the participant self-governing Congregational churches of the various colonial townships of the Massachusetts Bay Colony. These were empowered in the civil legislature and magistracy. It was debated at length in the Boston Synod of 1662. This was when the Episcopalian Act of Uniformity 1662 was being introduced in England. Consociationalism was originally discussed in academic terms by the political scientist Arend Lijphart. However, Lijphart has stated that he "merely discovered what political practitioners had repeatedly – and independently of both academic experts and one another – invented years earlier". Theoretically, consociationalism was inducted from Lijphart's observations of political accommodation in the Netherlands, after which Lijphart argued for a generalizable consociational approach to ethnic conflict regulation.

The Netherlands, as a consociational state, was between 1857 and 1967 divided into four non-territorial pillars: Calvinist, Catholic, socialist, and liberal, although until 1917 there was a plurality ("first past the post") electoral system rather than a proportional one. In their heyday, each comprised tightly organised groups, schools, universities, hospitals and newspapers, all divided along a Balkanised social structure. The theory, according to Lijphart, focuses on the role of social elites, their agreement and co-operation, as the key to a stable democracy. Based on this initial study of consociational democracy, John McGarry and Brendan O'Leary trace consociationalism back to 1917, when it was first employed in the Netherlands, while Gerhard Lehmbruch suggests "precursors" of consociationalism as early as the 1555 Peace of Augsburg.

== State-building ==
While Lijphart's initial theory drew primarily from Western European democracies in its formulation of consociationalism, it has gained immense traction in post-conflict state-building contexts in the past decades. This development has been reflected in the expansion of the favourable conditions to external factors in the literature as well. Rather than internally constructed by state elites, these recent examples have been characterised by external facilitation, and at times imposition, through international actors. In the process, consociational arrangements have frequently been used to transform immediate violent conflict and solidify peace settlements in extremely fragile contexts of deeply divided societies.

The volatile environments in which these recent examples have been implemented have exhibited the need for external interference not only for their initial implementation but also for their continued existence. As such, a range of international actors have assumed mediating and supporting roles to preserve power-sharing agreements in targeted states. Most prominently in Bosnia-Herzegovina, this has involved an "international regulating body" in the form of a High Representative who in one period frequently intervened in the domestic political affairs of the state to implement legislation on which domestic elites were reluctant to come to an agreement.

While the current results of consociational arrangements implemented in post-conflict state-building endeavours have been mixed, scholars such as O'Leary and McGarry maintain that they have often proven to be the most practical approach to ending immediate conflict and creating the necessary stability for peace-building to take place. Its utility has been seen in its transformative aspect, flexibility, and "realist" approach to existing identity formations that are difficult to incorporate in a majoritarian system.

== Characteristics ==
Lijphart identifies four key characteristics of consociational democracies:

Name	Explanation
Grand coalition	Elites of each pillar come together to rule in the interests of society because they recognize the dangers of non-cooperation.
Mutual veto	Consensus among the groups is required to confirm the majority rule. Mutuality means that the minority is unlikely to successfully block the majority. If one group blocks another on some matter, the latter are likely to block the former in return.
Proportionality	Representation is based on population. If one pillar accounts for 30% of the overall society, then they occupy 30% of the positions on the police force, in civil service, and in other national and civic segments of society.
Segmental autonomy	Creates a sense of individuality and allows for different culturally-based community laws.

Lijphart has also written, "The essential characteristic of consociational democracy is not so much any particular institutional arrangement as the deliberate joint effort by the elites to stabilize the system."

Consociational policies often have these characteristics:

- Coalition cabinets, where executive power is shared between parties, not concentrated in one. Many of these cabinets are oversized, meaning they include parties not necessary for a parliamentary majority;
- Balance of power between executive and legislative;
- Decentralized and federal government, where (regional) minorities have considerable independence;
- Incongruent bicameralism, where it is very difficult for one party to gain a majority in both houses. Normally one chamber represents regional interests and the other national interests;
- Proportional representation, to allow (small) minorities to gain representation too;
- Organized and corporatist interest groups, which represent minorities;
- A rigid constitution, which prevents government from changing the constitution without consent of minorities;
- Judicial review, which allows minorities to go to the courts to seek redress against laws that they see as unjust;
- Elements of direct democracy, which allow minorities to enact or prevent legislation;
- Proportional employment in the public sector;
- A neutral head of state, either a monarch with only ceremonial duties, or an indirectly elected president, who gives up his or her party affiliation after being elected;
- Referendums are only used to allow minorities to block legislation: this means that they must be a citizen's initiative and that there is no compulsory voting.
- Equality between ministers in cabinet, the prime minister is only primus inter pares;
- An independent central bank, where experts and not politicians set out monetary policies.

== Favourable conditions ==
Lijphart also identified a number of "favourable conditions" under which consociationalism is likely to be successful. He has changed the specification of these conditions somewhat over time. Michael Kerr summarised Lijphart's most prominent favourable factors as:

- Segmental isolation of ethnic communities
- A multiple balance of power
- The presence of external threats common to all communities
- Overarching loyalties to the state
- A tradition of elite accommodation
- Socioeconomic equality
- A small population size, reducing the policy load
- A moderate multi-party system with segmental parties

Lijphart stresses that these conditions are neither indispensable nor sufficient to account for the success of consociationalism. This has led Rinus van Schendelen to conclude that "the conditions may be present and absent, necessary and unnecessary, in short conditions or no conditions at all". John McGarry and Brendan O'Leary argue that three conditions are key to the establishment of democratic consociational power-sharing: elites have to be motivated to engage in conflict regulation; elites must lead deferential segments; and there must be a multiple balance of power, but more importantly the subcultures must be stable. Michael Kerr, in his study of the role of external actors in power-sharing arrangements in Northern Ireland and Lebanon, adds to McGarry and O'Leary's list the condition that "the existence of positive external regulating pressures, from state to non-state actors, which provide the internal elites with sufficient incentives and motives for their acceptance of, and support for, consociation".

== Arguments in favor ==
In a consociational state, all groups, including minorities, are represented on the political and economic stages. Supporters of consociationalism argue that it is a more realistic option in deeply divided societies than integrationist approaches to conflict management.

== Criticisms ==
Many criticisms have been levelled against the deployment of consociationalism in state-building. It has been criticised as institutionalising and deepening existing divisions, being severely dependent on external support for survival, and temporarily freezing conflicts but not resolving them. Given the apparent necessity for external regulation of these agreements, many scholars have characterised these state-building projects as deeply invasive. A recurring concern therein is the erosion of the governing elite's accountability towards its population and the fostering of clientele politics. These dynamics have been pointed to as obstacles to the resolution of the deep divisions consociations are meant to alleviate. Further critiques have pointed out that consociations have at times encouraged conditions of "fragile states", which state-building is meant to prevent. Finally, many critiques have pointed to the lack of conceptual clarity in the literature on consociatioanl democracy.

=== Brian Barry ===
Brian Barry has questioned the nature of the divisions that exist in the countries that Lijphart considers to be "classic cases" of consociational democracies. For example, he makes the case that in the Swiss example, "political parties cross-cut cleavages in the society and provide a picture of remarkable consensus rather than highly structured conflict of goals". In the case of the Netherlands, he argues that "the whole cause of the disagreement was the feeling of some Dutchman ... that it mattered what all the inhabitants of the country believed. Demands for policies aimed at producing religious or secular uniformity presuppose a concern ... for the state of grace of one's fellow citizens". He contrasts this to the case of a society marked by conflict, in this case Northern Ireland, where he argues that "the inhabitants ... have never shown much worry about the prospects of the adherents of the other religion going to hell". Barry concludes that in the Dutch case, consociationalism is tautological and argues that "the relevance of the 'consociational' model for other divided societies is much more doubtful than is commonly supposed".

=== Rinus van Schendelen ===
Rinus van Schendelen has argued that Lijphart uses evidence selectively. Pillarisation was "seriously weakening", even in the 1950s, cross-denominational co-operation was increasing, and formerly coherent political sub-cultures were dissolving. He argued that elites in the Netherlands were not motivated by preferences derived from the general interest, but rather by self-interest. They formed coalitions not to forge consociational negotiation between segments but to improve their parties' respective power. He argued that the Netherlands was "stable" in that it had few protests or riots, but that it was so before consociationalism, and that it was not stable from the standpoint of government turnover. He questioned the extent to which the Netherlands, or indeed any country labelled a consociational system, could be called a democracy, and whether calling a consociational country a democracy isn't somehow ruled out by definition. He believed that Lijphart suffered severe problems of rigor when identifying whether particular divisions were cleavages, whether particular cleavages were segmental, and whether particular cleavages were cross-cutting.

=== Lustick on hegemonic control ===
Ian Lustick has argued that academics lack an alternative "control" approach for explaining stability in deeply divided societies and that this has resulted in the empirical overextension of consociational models. Lustick argues that Lijphart has "an impressionistic methodological posture, flexible rules for coding data, and an indefatigable, rhetorically seductive commitment to promoting consociationalism as a widely applicable principle of political engineering", that results in him applying consociational theory to case studies that it does not fit. Furthermore, Lustick states that "Lijphart's definition of 'accommodation' ... includes the elaborately specified claim that issues dividing polarized blocs are settled by leaders convinced of the need for settlement".

=== Horowitz and centripetal criticism of consociationalism ===
Consociationalism focuses on diverging identities such as ethnicity instead of integrating identities such as class, institutionalizing and entrenching the former. Furthermore, it relies on rival co-operation, which is inherently unstable. It focuses on intrastate relations and neglects relations with other states. Donald L. Horowitz argues that consociationalism can lead to the reification of ethnic divisions, since "grand coalitions are unlikely, because of the dynamics of intraethnic competition. The very act of forming a multiethnic coalition generates intraethnic competition – flanking – if it does not already exist".

Consistent with Horowitz's claims, Dawn Brancati finds that federalism/territorial autonomy, an element of consociationalism, strengthens ethnic divisions if it is designed in a way that strengthens regional parties, which in turn encourage ethnic conflict. James Anderson also supports Horowitz's contention that consociational powersharing built around diverging identities can entrench and sharpen these divisions. Citing the example of Northern Ireland, Anderson argues such approaches tend to "prioritise the same general type of territorial identity as the ethno-nationalists". Nonetheless, Anderson concedes difficulty lies in the fact such identities cannot simply be wished away, as he argues is attempted when focusing only on individual rights at the expense of group rights. As an alternative of consociationalism Horowitz suggested an alternative model – centripetalism. Centripetalism aims to depoliticize ethnicity and to encourage multi-ethnic parties instead of reinforcing ethnic divides through political institutions.

=== Other criticisms ===
In 2022, Yascha Mounk argued that the case for consociationalism and power-sharing had weakened significantly since first proposed based on experiments and real-life observations. He argues that in some cases it can bring short-term peace, but that it is always temporary and is likely to worsen tensions in the long-run.

Critics point out that consociationalism is dangerous in a system of differing antagonistic ideologies, generally conservatism and communism. They state that specific conditions must exist for three or more groups to develop a multi- system with strong leaders. This philosophy is dominated by elites, with those masses that are sidelined with the elites having less to lose if war breaks out. Consociationalism cannot be imperially applied. For example, it does not effectively apply to Austria. Critics also point to the failure of this line of reasoning in Lebanon, a country that experienced civil war, and where the consociational arrangement was used by the post-war elite to capture state institutions and resources. It only truly applies in Switzerland, Belgium and the Netherlands, and not in more deeply divided societies. If one of three groups gets half plus one of the vote, then the other groups are in perpetual opposition, which is largely incompatible with consociationalism.

Consociationalism assumes that each group is cohesive and has strong leadership. Although the minority can block decisions, this requires 100 per cent agreement. Rights are given to communities rather than individuals, leading to over-representation of some individuals in society and under-representation of others. Grand coalitions are unlikely to happen due to the dynamics of ethnic competition. Each group seeks more power for itself. Consociationalists are criticized for focusing too much on the set up of institutions and not enough on transitional issues which go beyond such institutions. Finally, it is claimed that consociational institutions promote sectarianism and entrench existing identities.

== Examples ==
The political systems of a number of countries operate or used to operate on a consociational basis, including Belgium, Italy, Cyprus (effective 1960–1963), the First Czechoslovak Republic, Israel, Lebanon, the Netherlands (1917–1967), Northern Ireland, Switzerland (consultation mostly across ideological lines), Ethiopia, Zimbabwe-Rhodesia, and South Africa. Some academics have also argued that the European Union resembles a consociational democracy, with consultation across ideological lines. Additionally, a number of peace agreements are consociational, including:

- The Dayton Agreement that ended the 1992–1995 war in Bosnia and Herzegovina, which is described as a "classic example of consociational settlement" by Sumantra Bose and "an ideal-typical consociational democracy" by Roberto Belloni.
- The Good Friday Agreement of 1998 in Northern Ireland (and its subsequent reinforcement with 2006's St Andrews Agreement), which Brendan O'Leary describes as "power-sharing plus".
- The Ohrid Agreement of 2001 setting the constitutional framework for power-sharing in North Macedonia.
- The Arusha Agreement of 2000 and the 2005 Constitution in Burundi.

The Islamic Republic of Afghanistan's political system was also described as consociational, although it lacked ethnic quotas. In addition to the two-state solution to solve the Arab–Israeli conflict, some have argued for a one-state solution under a consociational democracy in the state of Israel, but this solution is not very popular, nor has it been discussed seriously at peace negotiations.

During the 1980s, the South African government attempted to reform apartheid into a consociational democracy. The South African Constitution of 1983 applied Lijphart's powersharing ideas by establishing a Tricameral Parliament. During the 1990s negotiations to end apartheid the National Party (NP) and Inkatha Freedom Party (IFP) proposed a settlement based upon consociationalism. The African National Congress (ANC) opposed consociationalism and proposed instead a settlement based upon majoritarian democracy. The NP abandoned consociationalism when the U.S. Department of State came out in favor of the majoritarian democracy model in 1992.

== See also ==
- Conflict management
- Consensus democracy
- Corporative federalism
- Directorial system
- Horizontalidad
- Minority groups
- Minority rights
- Negarchy
- Pillarisation
- Plural society
- Polycentric law
- Sui iuris
