= The Ministry of Unladylike Activity =

Ministry of Unladylike Affairs by Robin Stevens

- Author: Robin Stevens
- Cover artist: Jan Bielecki
- Language: English
- Genre: Mystery fiction, Children's fiction
- Publisher: Penguin Random House
- Publication date: 2022
- Publication place: United Kingdom
- Pages: 400

The Ministry of Unladylike Activity is the first book in a new children's mystery fiction series by British-American author Robin Stevens.

== Plot ==
The book is set in 1940, at the start of World War II, and the British government is setting up a secret agency to train spies, called the Ministry of Unladylike Activity. The protagonists are three new detectives from different backgrounds who find themselves caught up in two murders.

== Reception ==
The book has won several accolades including:

- Sunday Times Children's Book of the Week
- Blackwell's Children's Book of the Year 2022
- One of Waterstones' Best Children's Books of 2022
- One of the Daily Mail's choice of 2022's children's books
- One of the Irish Times' children's books of 2022
- One of the Guardian's best children's books of 2022
