= Siobhan Dowd =

English writer and activist (1960–2007)

- Siobhan Dowd at her marriage in March 2001
- Born: 4 February 1960; London, England
- Died: 21 August 2007 (aged 47); Oxford, England
- Education: Lady Margaret Hall, Oxford
- Spouses: Mial Pagan (1987–199x); Geoff Morgan (2001–2007; her death)
- Writing career
- Language: English
- Years active: 2004–2007
- Genre: children's literature
- Notable works: A Swift Pure Cry (2006); The London Eye Mystery (2007); Bog Child (2008); Solace of the Road (2009)
- Notable awards: Carnegie Medal (2009)

Siobhan Dowd (4 February 1960 – 21 August 2007) was a British writer and activist. The last book she completed, Bog Child, posthumously won the 2009 Carnegie Medal from the professional librarians, recognising the year's best book for children or young adults published in the UK.

== Life and career ==
Dowd was born in London, to Irish parents. She attended a Roman Catholic grammar school in south London and earned a BA Hons degree in Classics from Lady Margaret Hall, Oxford University and an MA with distinction from Greenwich University in Gender and Ethnic Studies.

In 1984, she joined the writer's organisation International PEN, initially as a researcher for its Writers in Prison Committee and later as Program Director of PEN American Center's Freedom-to-Write Committee in New York City. Her work there included founding and leading the Rushdie Defense Committee (USA) and travelling to Indonesia and Guatemala to investigate local human rights conditions for writers. During her seven-year stay in New York, Dowd was named one of the "top 100 Irish-Americans" by Irish-America Magazine and Aer Lingus for her global anti-censorship work.

On her return to the UK, Dowd co-founded, with Rachel Billington, English PEN's readers and writers program. The program takes authors into schools in socially deprived areas, as well as prisons, young offender's institutions and community projects. During 2004, Dowd served as Deputy Commissioner for Children's Rights in Oxfordshire, working with local government to ensure that statutory services affecting children's lives conform with UN protocols.

Before her death from breast cancer, the Siobhan Dowd Trust, a registered charity, was established, wherein the proceeds from her literary work will be used to assist disadvantaged children with their reading skills.

== Works ==
Dowd edited three anthologies in the Threatened Literature Series for the Freedom to Write Committee of the PEN American Center: This Prison Where I Live (Cassell, 1996) and, jointly with Ian Hancock and Rajko Djuric, The Roads of the Roma: a PEN Anthology of Gypsy Writers (University of Hertfordshire Press, 1998 and 2004). Although not listed as an official editor, she edited "Inked Over, Ripped Out: Burmese Storytellers and the Censors" (Silkworm Books, 1994), which was translated by Anna J. Allott and which featured stories by seven Burmese writers.

An invitation by Tony Bradman to contribute a story about an Irish "Pavee" (gypsy/traveller) to his collection of short stories for children about racism, Skin Deep (Puffin, 2004), led to a new career as an author of children's books. Dowd was inspired by this success to continue writing for children and developed close friendships with two established children's authors, Lee Weatherly and Fiona Dunbar. They would meet regularly to chat about their work and discuss children's literature.

=== Completed novels ===
Dowd's first novel was A Swift Pure Cry, a 2006 novel about a teenager named Shell, a girl who lives in County Cork, Ireland. It won the 2007 Branford Boase Award and the Eilís Dillon Award. It was short-listed for the Carnegie Medal, Booktrust Teenage Prize, the Waterstone's Children's Book Prize, the Sheffield Children's Book Award, the Deutscher Jugendliteraturpreis, and the CBI Bisto Book of the Year Award; long-listed for the Guardian Children's Fiction Prize. For it she was awarded the Children's Book Ireland Eilís Dillon Award (sponsored by Bisto) in May 2007 and the Branford Boase Award in June 2007.

The London Eye Mystery was Dowd's second novel, published by David Fickling in June 2007. It won the NASEN/TES Special Educational Needs Children's Book Award, was longlisted for the 2008 Carnegie Medal, and was shortlisted for the Red House Children's Book Award, Doncaster Book Award, and Southwark Schools Book Award. In May 2008, Dowd was posthumously awarded the €10,000 Bisto Book of the Year prize for The London Eye Mystery. In January 2009 it won the Salford Children's Book Award, and January 2010 it won the Dolly Gray Children's Literature Award.

At the time of her death she had completed two more novels that have since been published. Bog Child (February 2008) won the Carnegie Medal (above) and made the Guardian Award shortlist. It features a boy who makes a horrible discovery digging peat in 1980s Ireland: the body of a young girl who may have been murdered. Solace of the Road (January 2009) was shortlisted for both the Guardian Award and the Costa Book Award.

=== A Monster Calls ===
She had the characters, a premise, and a beginning. What she didn't have, unfortunately, was time.
—Patrick Ness, in the Author's Note to A Monster Calls

Dowd had undertaken at least one more children's novel before her death, about a young boy coming to terms with his mother's terminal illness. She had discussed it and contracted to write it with editor Denise Johnstone-Burt at Walker Books, who also worked with Patrick Ness, author of the acclaimed Chaos Walking trilogy. Walker arranged for Ness to write the story; later, Walker and Ness arranged for Jim Kay to illustrate it; and A Monster Calls (May 2011) was published before Ness and Kay met. In 2012 it won both the Carnegie Medal (Ness) and the companion Kate Greenaway Medal (Kay) as the year's best children's/young adult book published in the UK, a double-award unique in more than fifty years.

== Personal life ==
Dowd was married twice. Her first marriage to Mial Pagan broke down in the early 1990s and she subsequently moved to New York City, where she worked for PEN American Center. Dowd spent seven years in New York until she returned to London in 1997, to spend more time with her family. In 2000 she met Geoff Morgan, a librarian at Oxford Brookes University. They married in March 2001 in Wales.

In September 2004, Dowd was diagnosed with advanced breast cancer. In spite of this, she continued to write prolifically. In her last year of life she developed a friendship with the children's author Meg Rosoff, who had also been diagnosed with breast cancer.

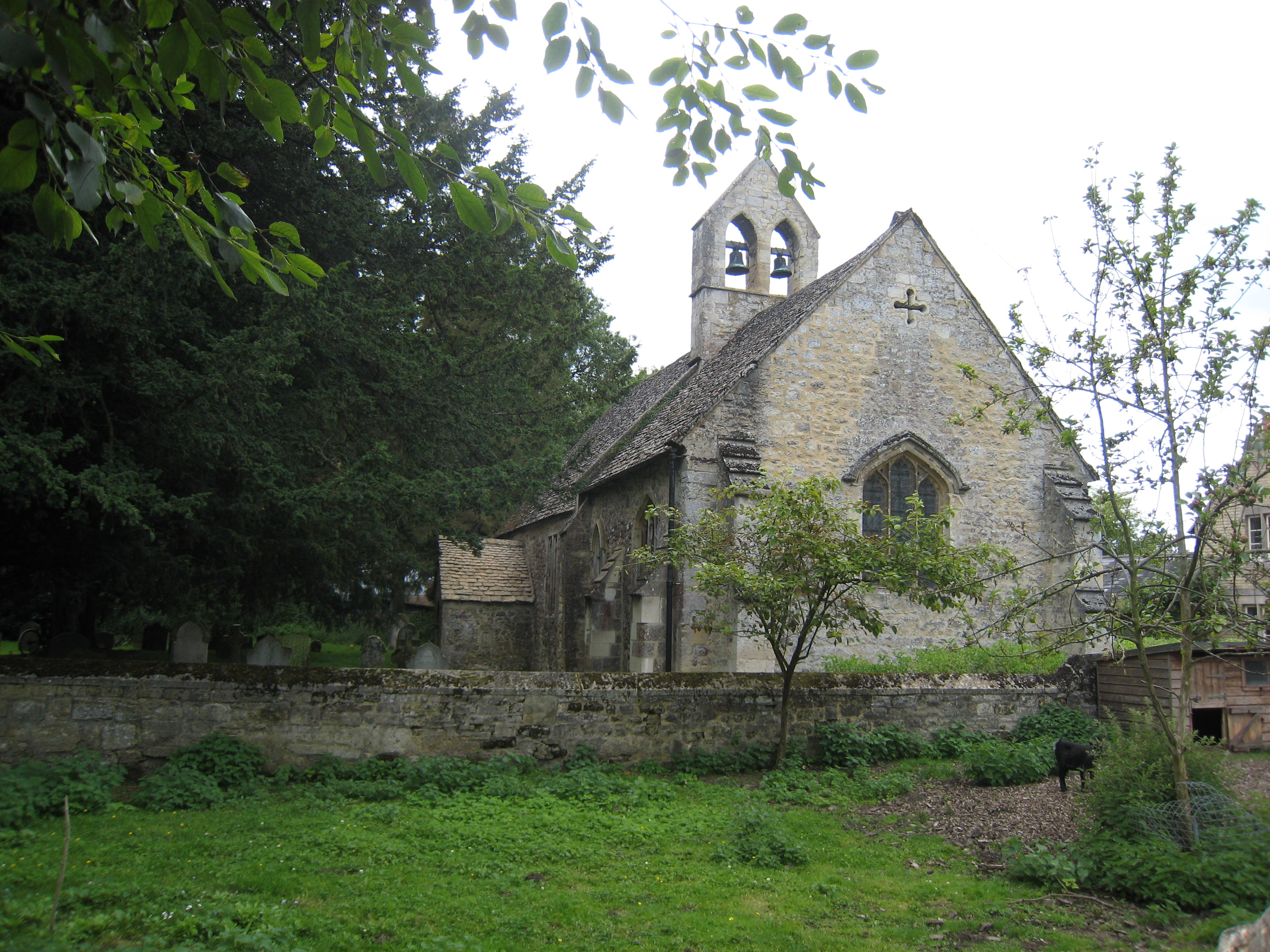
St Margaret's Church, Binsey, Oxford, where Siobhan Dowd is buried

Dowd died of breast cancer on 21 August 2007, aged 47. She was survived by her husband. She was interred in the graveyard at St Margaret's Church in Binsey, Oxfordshire.
