= UN Mediation Support Unit =

United Nations body

The Mediation Support Unit was established in 2006 within the United Nations Department of Political and Peacebuilding Affairs as an outcome of the 2005 World Summit, which included a call for the expansion of the UN's conflict prevention and resolution capacity.

The MSU serves as a central repository for peacemaking experiences and acts as a clearing house for lessons learned and best practices. The unit also coordinates training for mediators and provides them with advice on UN standards and operating procedures.

Between 2008 and 2011, the MSU was involved in supporting over thirty peace processes on all continents.

The MSU manages the United Nations Standby Team of Mediation Experts, an on-call group of experts who assist mediators in the field that was established in 2008. The MSU also manages the online mediation support tool UN Peacemaker.
