= Berhan Taye =

Ethopian digital rights activist

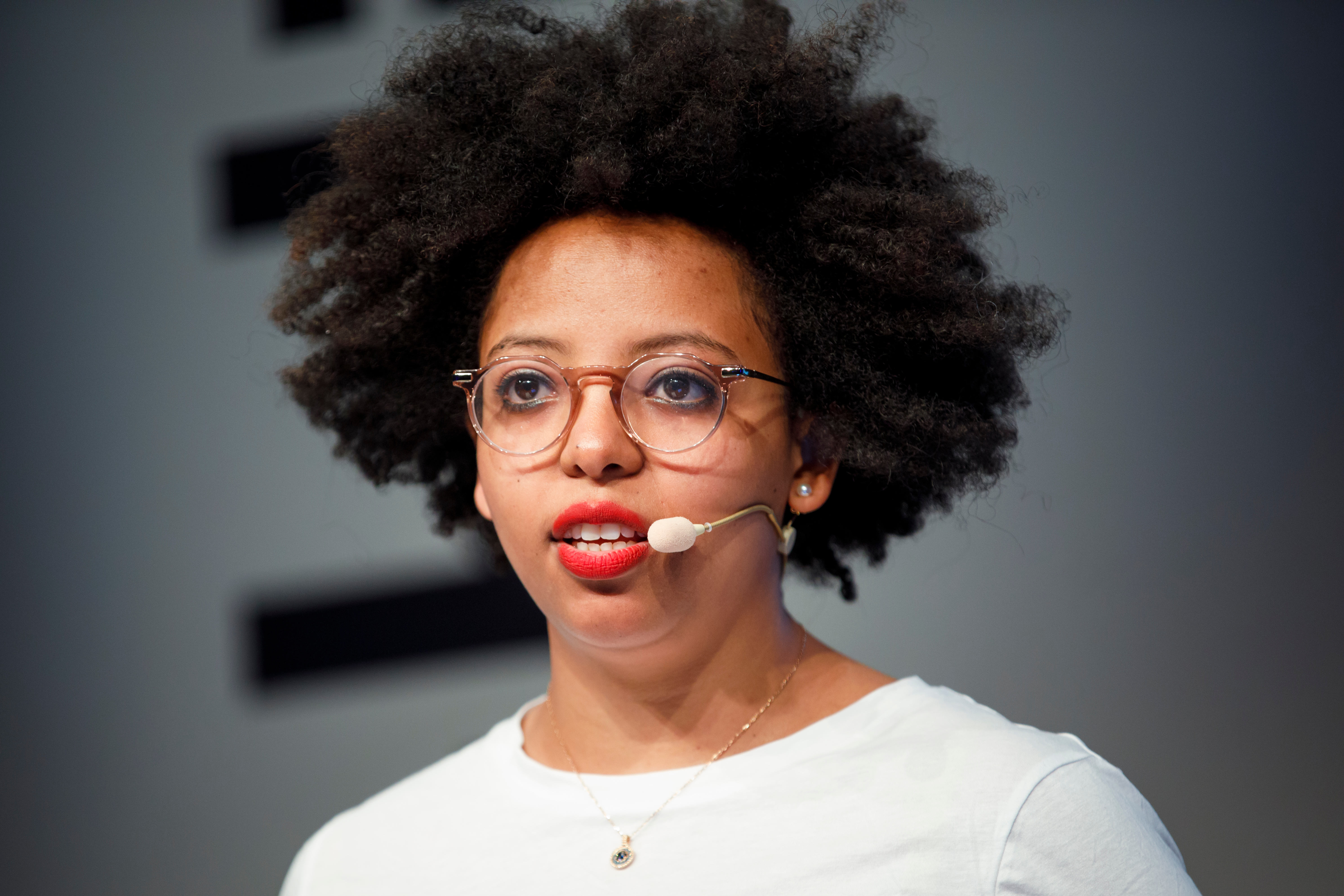
- Taye speaking at re:publica in 2019.
- Education: University of Notre Dame
- Occupations: Digital rights activist, researcher

Berhan Taye is an Ethiopian digital rights activist and researcher.

== Education ==
Taye completed her undergraduate degree from Addis Ababa University in Ethiopia. Following her degree she moved to Sweden to study international relations. She has a master's degree in peace studies at the University of Notre Dame in Indiana, USA.

== Career ==
In 2012, her passion for political transformation and restorative justice made her work as a communication assistant for CEWARN (Conflict Early Warning and Response Mechanism), a voluntary work to mediate conflicts in East Africa. She became the lead for Access Now’s work on digital rights in Africa as the Africa Policy Manager. She is also a researcher in the Center for Intellectual Property and Information Technology (CIPIT) at Strathmore University in Nairobi, Kenya.

== Activism ==
Her path towards social justice began early, when at age sixteen, she was harassed sexually by a stranger on her way back from school. She escaped from him and then began volunteering work at the local women's affairs office where survivors of domestic abuse come to make their complaints. She researched technology for social justice which helps activists like herself fight for access to information and freedom of expression.
