= Arend Lijphart =

Dutch-American political scientist (born 1936)

Arend d'Angremond Lijphart
- Born: 17 August 1936 (age 90); Apeldoorn, Netherlands
- Education: Principia College (BA); Yale University (MA, PhD)
- Known for: Consociationalism, Consensus democracy
- Awards: President of APSA (1995–1996); Johan Skytte Prize in Political Science (1997); honorary doctorates from University of Leiden (2001), Queen's University Belfast (2004), Ghent University (2009); Honorary Fellow of Coventry University (2015)
- Scientific career
- Fields: Political science
- Workplaces: University of California, San Diego

Arend D'Angremond Lijphart (born 17 August 1936) is a Dutch-American political scientist whose work and research focuses on democracy, comparative politics, electoral systems, and constitutional design.He is Professor Emeritus of Political Science at the University of California, San Diego. He is also known for his distinction between majoritarian and consensus models of democracy.

== Biography ==
Lijphart was born on 17 August 1936 in Apeldoorn, the Netherlands. He completed his secondary education at the Gymnasium in Apeldoorn before moving to the United States for university study. He earned a Bachelor of Arts degree from Principia College in 1958 and received a Master of Arts degree from Yale University in 1959. He received his Ph.D. in Political Science in 1963.

== Academic career ==
Lijphart began his academic career as an instructor at Elmira College from 1961 to 1963. He joined the University of California, Berkeley, in 1963 as Assistant Professor of Political Science and was later promoted to Associate Professor.

In 1968 he joined Leiden University where he served as Professor of International Relations and Political Science and chaired the Department of Political Science and International Relations.

In 1978 Lijphart joined the University of California, San Diego, as Professor of Political Science. He later served as Acting Chair of the department and was appointed Research Professor of Political Science in 1994. Following his retirement from regular teaching, he became Research Professor Emeritus in 2000.

He also held visiting appointments at institutions including Harvard University, the Australian National University, the University of Oxford, the University of Vienna, the University of Canterbury, the University of Auckland, the Science Center Berlin, and the Netherlands Institute for Advanced Study.

== Scholarly works ==
=== Consociational democracy ===
Lijphart is known for developing the theory of consociational democracy, a model designed to explain democratic stability in deeply divided societies. Building on his studies of the Netherlands, Belgium, Austria, Switzerland, and other plural societies, he argued that political stability can be achieved through cooperation among leaders of different social, religious, linguistic, or ethnic groups.

His books on this issue include The Politics of Accommodation (1968) and Democracy in Plural Societies(1977) established the foundations of consociational theory. He argued that power sharing, proportional representation, minority vetoes, and elite cooperation can help maintain democratic governance in societies characterized by deep social divisions.

The theory has been discussed in relation to constitutional arrangements and conflict management in countries such as Northern Ireland, South Africa, Lebanon, Bosnia and Herzegovina, and Iraq.

=== Comparative democracy ===
From the 1980s onward, Lijphart's research examined democratic institutions across multiple countries. In Democracies: Patterns of Majoritarian and Consensus Government in Twenty-One Countries (1984), Lijphart compared democratic systems and developed a distinction between majoritarian and consensus models of government. He expanded this analysis in Patterns of Democracy (1999), examining the institutional differences between the two models across a wider range of countries. He identified coalition governments, proportional representation, federalism, bicameralism, and power-sharing as features of consensus democracy and compared their effects on political representation, policy-making, and minority participation.

=== Electoral systems ===
Lijphart's research also examined electoral systems and their effects on democratic representation. He studied proportional representation, voter turnout, party systems, and the institutional consequences of electoral-system design. In Electoral Systems and Party Systems: A Study of Twenty-Seven Democracies, 1945–1990 (1994), he compared electoral arrangements and their effects on party systems and political representation.

=== Constitutional design and democratic reform ===
Lijphart's research has been cited in discussions of constitutional reform and democratic transitions, particularly in relation to electoral systems, federalism, power-sharing arrangements, and institutional design in emerging democracies..

=== Divided and Plural Societies ===
Lijphart has examined democracy in divided and plural societies. Building on his early studies of the Netherlands, he compared political systems in countries with ethnic, religious, linguistic, and ideological divisions. His research examined the institutional arrangements through which such societies maintained democratic government and political cooperation.

In his theory of consociational democracy, Lijphart proposed that political stability in divided societies could be maintained through power-sharing among representatives of major social groups. He identified four principal features of this system: grand coalition governments, mutual veto rights for minorities, proportional representation in political and administrative institutions, and autonomy for distinct social groups.

Lijphart examined power-sharing arrangements in countries including the Netherlands, Belgium, Switzerland, Austria, and Lebanon. His work also became part of academic discussions on constitutional arrangements and post-conflict governance in countries such as Northern Ireland, Bosnia and Herzegovina, South Africa, and Iraq.

=== Methodology ===
Lijphart contributed to the study of comparative research methods through his 1971 article, "Comparative Politics and the Comparative Method," published in the American Political Science Review. He examined the comparative method in relation to experimental and statistical approaches, identifying the limited number of cases as a central difficulty in comparative research. He proposed four ways to address this limitation: increasing the number of cases through longitudinal and cross-national analysis, reducing the number of variables under consideration, selecting comparable cases, and focusing on key variables.

The article also classified case studies into six types: atheoretical, interpretative, hypothesis-generating, theory-confirming, theory-infirming, and deviant-case studies. His discussion drew on earlier work by sociologist Neil Smelser and provided a basis for subsequent methodological research by political scientist David Collier.

== Awards and honors ==
Over his career, Lijphart has received many awards and honors:

- 1984–85 Guggenheim fellow
- 1989 Elected to the American Academy of Arts and Sciences
- 1995 to 1996 Served as President of the American Political Science Association.
- In 1993 he became foreign member of the Royal Netherlands Academy of Arts and Sciences.
- 1997 Awarded the prestigious Johan Skytte Prize in Political Science in 1997.
- 1998 Elected to the British Academy
- 2010 Received the Constantine Panunzio Distinguished Emeritus Award

Lijphart has also received honorary doctorate from Leiden University (2001), Queen's University Belfast (2004), and Ghent University (2009).

== Publications ==
=== Books ===
- Lijphart, Arend. 1966. The Trauma of Decolonization: The Dutch & West New Guinea. New Haven: Yale University Press.
- Lijphart, Arend. 1968. The Politics of Accommodation. Pluralism and Democracy in the Netherlands, Berkeley, California: University of California Press.
- Lijphart, Arend. 1977. Democracy in Plural Societies: A Comparative Exploration. New Haven: Yale University Press. ISBN 978-0-300-02494-4.
- Lijphart, Arend. 1984. Democracies: Patterns of Majoritarian & Consensus Government in Twenty-one Countries. New Haven: Yale University Press. ISBN 978-0-300-03182-9.
- Lijphart, Arend. 1985. Power-Sharing in South Africa. Berkeley: Institute of International Studies, University of California. ISBN 978-0-87725-524-6.
- Grofman, Bernard, and Lijphart, Arend (eds.). 1986. Electoral Laws & Their Political Consequences. New York: Agathon Press. ISBN 978-0-87586-074-9.
- Lijphart, Arend. 1994. Electoral Systems and Party Systems: A Study of Twenty-Seven Democracies, 1945–1990. Oxford: Oxford University Press. ISBN 978-0-19-828054-5.
- Lijphart, Arend, and Waisman, Carlos H. (eds.). 1996. Institutional Design in New Democracies. Boulder, Colorado: Westview. ISBN 978-0-8133-2109-7.
- Lijphart, Arend. 1999. Patterns of Democracy: Government Forms and Performance in Thirty-Six Countries. New Haven: Yale University Press. ISBN 978-0-300-07893-0
- Grofman, Bernard and Lijphart, Arend (eds.). 2002. The Evolution of Electoral & Party Systems in the Nordic Countries. New York: Agathon Press. ISBN 978-0-87586-138-8.
- Lijphart, Arend. 2008. Thinking About Democracy. Power sharing and majority rule in theory and practice. New York, NY: Routledge.
- Lijphart, Arend. 2012. Patterns of Democracy: Government Forms & Performance in Thirty-six Countries, Second Edition. New Haven: Yale University Press. ISBN 978-0-300-17202-7
- Taylor, Steven L., Matthew S. Shugart, Arend Lijphart, and Bernard Grofman. 2014. A Different Democracy: American Government in a 31-Country Perspective. New Haven: Yale University Press.

=== Articles and chapters ===
- Lijphart, Arend. 1968. ”Typologies of Democratic Systems.“ Comparative Political Studies 1(1): 3–44.
- Lijphart, Arend. 1969. "Consociational Democracy." World Politics 21(2): 207–25.
- Lijphart, Arend. 1971. "Comparative Politics and the Comparative Method." American Political Science Review 65(3):682–93.
- Lijphart, Arend. 1972. "Toward Empirical Democratic Theory: Research Strategies and Tactics." Comparative Politics 4(3): 417–32.
- Lijphart, Arend. 1975. "The Comparable-Case Strategy in Comparative Research." Comparative Political Studies 8(2): 158–77.
- Lijphart, Arend. 1997. "Dimensions of democracies". European Journal of Political Research 31: 193–204/
- Lijphart, Arend. 1998. "Consensus and Consensus: Democracy Cultural, Structural, Functional, and Rational-Choice Explanations." Scandinavian Political Studies 21(2): 99–108. (Lecture given by the Winner of the Johan Skytte Prize in Political Science, Uppsala, 4 October 1997.)
- Lijphart, Arend. 2000. "The Pros and Cons – but mainly Pros – of Consensus Democracy". Acta Politica 36(2): 129–39.
- Lijphart, Arend. 2000. "The Future of Democracy: Reasons for Pessimism, but Also Some Optimism." Scandinavian Political Studies 23(3): 245–283.
- Lijphart, Arend. 2001. "Democracy in the 21st century: Can we be optimistic?" European Review 9(2), 169–184.
- Lijphart, Arend. 2002. "Negotiation Democracy versus Consensus Democracy: Parallel Conclusions and Recommendations." European Journal of Political Research 41(1):107–113.
- Lijphart, Arend. 2004. "Constitutional Design for Divided Societies." Journal of Democracy 15,2: 96–109.
- Lijphart, Arend. 2013. "Steps in My Research and Thinking About Power Sharing and Democratic Institutions." Taiwan Journal of Democracy Special issue, 1–7.
- Lijphart, Arend. 2018. "Consociationalism After Half a Century," pp. 1–9, in Michaelina Jakala, Durukan Kuzu, and Matt Qvortrup (eds.). Consociationalism and Power-Sharing in Europe. Arend Lijphart's Theory of Political Accommodation. Cham: Palgrave Macmillan.
