= Conflict management =

Reducing workplace interpersonal conflict

Conflict management is the process of limiting the negative aspects of conflict while increasing the positive aspects of conflict in the workplace. The aim of conflict management is to enhance learning and group outcomes, including effectiveness or performance in an organizational setting. Properly managed conflict can improve group outcomes.

== Conflict resolution ==
Conflict resolution involves the process of the reducing, eliminating, or terminating of all forms and types of conflict. Five styles for conflict management, as identified by Thomas and Kilmann, are: competing, compromising, collaborating, avoiding, and accommodating.

Businesses can benefit from appropriate types and levels of conflict. That is the aim of conflict management, and not the aim of conflict rejection. Conflict management does not imply conflict resolution.

Conflict management minimizes the negative outcomes of conflict and promotes the positive outcomes of conflict with the goal of improving learning in an organization.

Properly managed conflict increases organizational learning by increasing the number of questions asked and encourages people to challenge the status quo.

== Organizational conflict ==
Organizational conflict at the interpersonal level includes disputes between peers as well as supervisor-subordinate conflict. Party-directed mediation (PDM) is a mediation approach particularly suited for disputes between co-workers, colleagues or peers, especially deep-seated interpersonal conflict, multicultural or multiethnic disputes. The mediator listens to each party separately in a pre-caucus or pre-mediation before ever bringing them into a joint session. Part of the pre-caucus also includes coaching and role plays. The idea is that the parties learn how to converse directly with their adversary in the joint session. Some unique challenges arise when organizational disputes involve supervisors and subordinates. The Negotiated Performance Appraisal (NPA) is a tool for improving communication between supervisors and subordinates and is particularly useful as an alternate mediation model because it preserves the hierarchical power of supervisors while encouraging dialogue and dealing with differences in opinion.

== Orientations to conflict ==
There are three orientations to conflict: lose-lose, win-lose, and win-win. The lose-lose orientation is a type of conflict that tends to end negatively for all parties involved. A win-lose orientation results in one victorious party, usually at the expense of the other. The win-win orientation is one of the most essential concepts to conflict resolution. A win-win solution arrived at by integrative bargaining may be close to optimal for both parties. This approach engages in a cooperative approach or a collaborative approach rather than a competitive one.

Although the win-win concept is the ideal orientation, the notion that there can only be one winner is constantly being reinforced in American culture:

"The win-lose orientation is manufactured in our society in athletic competition, admission to academic programs, industrial promotion systems, and so on. Individuals tend to generalize from their objective win-lose situations and apply these experiences to situations that are not objectively fixed-pies".

This kind of mentality can be destructive when communicating with different cultural groups by creating barriers in negotiation, resolution and compromise; it can also lead the "loser" to feel mediocre. When the win-win orientation is absent in negotiation, different responses to conflict may be observed.

=== Early conflict management models ===
Blake and Mouton (1964) were among the first to present a conceptual scheme for classifying the modes (styles) for handling interpersonal conflicts in five types: forcing, withdrawing, smoothing, compromising, and problem solving.

In the 1970s and 1980s, researchers began using the intentions of the parties involved to classify the styles of conflict management that they included in their models. Both Thomas (1976) and Pruitt (1983) put forth a model based on the concerns of the parties involved in the conflict. The combination of the parties' concern for their own interests (i.e. assertiveness) and their concern for the interests of those across the table (i.e. cooperativeness) yielded a particular conflict management style. Pruitt called these styles yielding (low assertiveness/high cooperativeness), problem solving (high assertiveness/high cooperativeness), inaction (low assertiveness/low cooperativeness), and contending (high assertiveness/low cooperativeness). Pruitt argues that problem-solving is the preferred method when seeking mutually beneficial options (win-win).

=== Khun and Poole's model ===
Khun and Poole (2000) established a similar system of group conflict management. In their system, they split Kozan's confrontational model into two sub-models: distributive and integrative.

- Distributive – Here conflict is approached as a distribution of a fixed amount of positive outcomes or resources, where one side will end up winning and the other losing, even if they do win some concessions.
- Integrative – Groups utilizing the integrative model see conflict as a chance to integrate the needs and concerns of both groups and make the best outcome possible. This model has a heavier emphasis on compromise than the distributive model. Khun and Poole found that the integrative model resulted in consistently better task-related outcomes than those using the distributive model.

=== DeChurch and Marks's meta-taxonomy ===
DeChurch and Marks (2001) examined the literature available on conflict management at the time and Ni established what they claimed was a "meta-taxonomy" that encompasses all other models.

They argued that all other styles have inherent in them into two dimensions:

- activeness ("the extent to which conflict behaviors make a responsive and direct rather than inert and indirect impression"). High activeness is characterized by openly discussing differences of opinion while fully going after their own interest.
- agreeableness ("the extent to which conflict behaviors make a pleasant and relaxed rather than unpleasant and strainful impression"). High agreeableness is characterized by attempting to satisfy all parties involved.

In the study DeChurch and Marks conducted to validate this division, activeness did not have a significant effect on the effectiveness of conflict resolution, but the agreeableness of the conflict management style, whatever it was, did have a positive impact on how groups felt about the way the conflict was managed, regardless of the outcome.

=== Rahim's meta-model ===
Rahim (2002) noted that there is agreement among management scholars that there is no one best approach to how to make decisions, lead or manage conflict.

In a similar vein, rather than creating a very specific model of conflict management, Rahim created a meta-model (in much the same way that DeChurch and Marks, 2001, created a meta-taxonomy) for conflict styles based on two dimensions, concern for self and concern for others.

Within this framework are five management approaches: integrating, obliging, dominating, avoiding, and compromising.

- Integration involves openness, exchanging information, looking for alternatives, and examining differences to solve the problem in a manner that is acceptable to both parties.
- Obliging is associated with attempting to minimize the differences and highlight the commonalities to satisfy the concern of the other party.
- Dominating in this style one party goes all out to win his or her objective and, as a result, often ignores the needs and expectations of the other party.
- Avoiding here a party fails to satisfy his or her own concern as well as the concern of the other party.
- Compromising involves give-and-take whereby both parties give up something to make a mutually acceptable decision.

== International conflict management ==
Special consideration should be paid to conflict management between two parties from distinct cultures. In addition to the everyday sources of conflict, "misunderstandings, and from this counterproductive, pseudo conflicts, arise when members of one culture are unable to understand culturally determined differences in communication practices, traditions, and thought processing". Indeed, this has already been observed in the business research literature.

Renner (2007) recounted several episodes where managers from developed countries moved to less developed countries to resolve conflicts within the company and met with little success due to their failure to adapt to the conflict management styles of the local culture.

As an example, in Kozan's study noted above, he noted that Asian cultures are far more likely to use a harmony model of conflict management. If a party operating from a harmony model comes in conflict with a party using a more confrontational model, misunderstandings above and beyond those generated by the conflict itself will arise.

International conflict management, and the cultural issues associated with it, is one of the primary areas of research in the field at the time, as existing research is insufficient to deal with the ever-increasing contact occurring between international entities.

== Interorganizational conflict management ==
One of the key features of conflict management in inter-organizational relationships is the involvement of both an individual level and an organizational level. In inter-organizational relationships, conflicts have to be managed through a set of formal and informal governance mechanisms. These mechanisms influence the likelihood and type of conflicts but also the way conflicts are managed between the parties.

== Application ==
=== Higher education ===
With only 14% of researched universities reporting mandatory courses in this subject, and with up to 25% of the manager day being spent on dealing with conflict, education needs to reconsider the importance of this subject. The subject warrants emphasis on enabling students to deal with conflict management.

"Providing more conflict management training in undergraduate business programs could help raise the emotional intelligence of future managers." The improvement of emotional intelligence found that employees were more likely to use problem-solving skills, instead of trying to bargain.

Students need to have a good set of social skills. Good communication skills allow the manager to accomplish interpersonal situations and conflict. Instead of focusing on conflict as a behavior issue, focus on the communication of it.

With an understanding of the communications required, the student will gain the aptitude needed to differentiate between the nature and types of conflicts. These skills also teach that relational and procedural conflict needs a high degree of immediacy to resolution. If these two conflicts are not dealt with quickly, an employee will become dissatisfied or perform poorly.

It is also the responsibility of companies to react. One option is to identify the skills needed in-house, but if the skills for creating workplace fairness are already lacking, it may be best to seek assistance from an outside organization, such as a developmental assessment center.

According to Rupp, Baldwin, and Bashur, these organizations "have become a popular means for providing coaching, feedback, and experiential learning opportunities". Their main focus is fairness and how it impacts employees' attitudes and performance.

These organizations teach competencies and what they mean. The students then participate in simulations. Multiple observers assess and record what skills are being used and then return this feedback to the participant. After this assessment, participants are then given another set of simulations to utilize the skills learned. Once again they receive additional feedback from observers, in hopes that the learning can be used in their workplace.

The feedback the participant receives is detailed, behaviorally specific, and high quality. This is needed for the participant to learn how to change their behavior. In this regard, it is also important that the participant take time to self-reflect so that learning may occur.

Once an assessment program is utilized, action plans may be developed based on quantitative and qualitative data.

=== Counseling ===
When personal conflict leads to frustration and loss of efficiency, counseling may prove to be a helpful antidote. Although few organizations can afford the luxury of having professional counselors on the staff, given some training, managers may be able to perform this function. Nondirective counseling, or "listening with understanding", is little more than being a good listener — something every manager should be.

Sometimes the simple process of being able to vent one's feelings, that is; to express them to a concerned and understanding listener–is enough to relieve frustration and make it possible for the frustrated individual to advance to a problem-solving frame of mind, better able to cope with a personal difficulty that is affecting his work adversely. The nondirective approach is one effective way for managers to deal with frustrated subordinates and co-workers.

There are other more direct and more diagnostic ways that might be used in appropriate circumstances. The great strength of the nondirective approach (nondirective counseling is based on the client-centered therapy of Carl Rogers), however, lies in its simplicity, its effectiveness, and the fact that it deliberately avoids the manager-counselor's diagnosing and interpreting emotional problems, which would call for special psychological training. No one has ever been harmed by being listened to sympathetically and understandingly. On the contrary, this approach has helped many people to cope with problems that were interfering with their effectiveness on the job.

== See also ==
- Alternative dispute resolution
- Conflict escalation
- Appeasement
- Deterrence theory
- Peace education
