= Democrat =

Democrat, Democrats, or Democratic may refer to:

== Politics ==
- A proponent of democracy, or democratic government; a form of government involving rule by the people.
- A member of a Democratic Party (disambiguation)
  - Democratic Party (Cyprus) (DCY)
  - Democratic Party (Hong Kong) (DPHK)
  - Democratic Party (Italy) (PD)
  - Democratic Party (Japan) (DP)
  - Democratic Party (United States) (D)
  - Democratic Progressive Party (DPP)
  - Democratic Party (South Korea, 2015)
  - Democratic Party (Indonesia) (PD)
- A member of a Democrat Party (disambiguation)
- A member of a Democracy Party (disambiguation)
- Australian Democrats, a political party
- Democrat (Brazil), a political party
- Democrats (Brazil), a political party
- Democrats (Chile), a political party
- Democrats (Croatia), a political party
- Democrats (Gothenburg political party), in the city of Gothenburg, Sweden
- Democrats (Greece, 2009), political party led by Theodoros Polyzoidis
- Democrats (Greece, 2024), political party led by Andreas Loverdos
- Democrats – Progressive Centre, political party in Greece
- Democrats (Greenland), a political party
- Democrats (Slovakia), a political party
- Democrats. of Anže Logar, a political party
- Sweden Democrats, a political party
- Supporters of political parties and democracy movements in Hong Kong and Macau:
  - Pro-democracy camp (Hong Kong)
  - Localist camp (Hong Kong)
  - Pro-democracy camp (Macau)

== Places ==
- Democrat, California
- Democrat, Kentucky
- Democrat Gulch, a valley in Oregon
- Democratic Republic of Afghanistan
- Democratic Republic of the Congo
- German Democratic Republic
- People's Democratic Republic of Ethiopia
- Democratic People's Republic of Korea
- Lao People's Democratic Republic
- Federal Democratic Republic of Nepal
- Somali Democratic Republic
- People's Democratic Republic of Yemen

== Other uses ==
- Democrats (film), a 2014 documentary about politics in Zimbabwe

== See also ==
- Democracy (disambiguation)
- Democrat Party (disambiguation)
- Democracy Party (disambiguation)
- Democratic Party (disambiguation)
- Democrat Party (epithet), a political epithet used in the United States instead of the Democratic Party
- Demokrat (disambiguation)
- Mr. Democracy (disambiguation)
- New Democrats (disambiguation)
- The Democrats (disambiguation)
- Republicanism
- Monarchism
