= The Democrats =

The Democrat or The Democrats may refer to:

== Political parties ==
- Democratic Party (United States)
- The Democrats (Austria)
- The Democrats (Benin)
- Les Démocrates, Canada
- The Democrats (Gabon)
- The Democrats (Israel)
- The Democrats (Italy)
- The Democrats (Maldives)
- Liberal Democrats (UK), known as the Democrats in 1988-9

== Other uses ==
- The Democrat (newspaper)
- List of newspapers named The Democrat

== See also ==
- Democrat (disambiguation)
- Democrat Party (disambiguation)
- Democratic Party (disambiguation)
