= Democracy (disambiguation) =

Democracy is a political concept or form of government.

Democracy or Democracies may also refer to:

== Politics ==
- When used as a noun, the phrase "a democracy" is often used as substitute for the continental European concept of a Rechtsstaat
- "The Democracy", a 19th-century term for the U.S. Democratic Party
- A Democracy Party
- A management style in which employees take part in decision-making

== Printed media ==
- Democracy (newspaper), a defunct English-language newspaper published in Thailand
- Democracy (novel), a 1984 novel by Joan Didion
- Democracy (journal), a progressive political journal
- Democracy (play), a stage play by Michael Frayn
- Democracy: An American Novel, an 1880 novel by Henry Adams
- Democracy: The God That Failed, a book by Hans-Hermann Hoppe
- Democracy: Stories from the Long Road to Freedom, a 2017 book by Condoleezza Rice
- Democracies: Patterns of Majoritarian & Consensus Government in Twenty-one Countries, a 1984 book by Arend Lijphart

== Film, TV and games ==
- Democracy (film), a 1918 British film directed by Sidney Morgan
- "Democracy" (Numbers), an episode of the television series Numbers
- "Democracy" (Stewart Lee's Comedy Vehicle), a TV episode
- Democracy (video game), a turn based political strategy video game
- Democracy Player, later called Miro (software), an Internet TV platform developed by the Participatory Culture Foundation

== Music ==
- Democracy (album), a 1996 album by English post-punk group Killing Joke
- "Democracy" (song), a song by Leonard Cohen from his album The Future

== See also ==
- Democracy Party (disambiguation)
- Democrat (disambiguation)
- Democracy Now (disambiguation)
