= Party for Democracy =

Party for Democracy may refer to:

- Party for Democracy (Chile), a Chilean political party.
- Party for Democracy in Central Africa, a political party in the Central African Republic.
- Party for Democracy and Progress (disambiguation)
- Party for Democracy and Rally, a defunct political party in Burkina-Faso.
- Party for Democracy and Socialism, a defunct political party in Burkina-Faso.
- Party for Democracy and Socialism/Metba, a political party in Burkina-Faso.
- Party for Democracy and Reconciliation, a political party in Burundi.
- Party for Democracy and Renewal, a political party in Togo.

== See also ==
- Democracy Party (disambiguation)
- Democratic Party (disambiguation)
- Democrat Party (disambiguation)
