= Polish American Enterprise Fund =

The Polish American Enterprise Fund was an investment fund established by the United States government (USG) to promote free enterprise in Poland in the 1990s.

== History ==
The fund was first suggested by President George H. W. Bush in April 1989. It was established in 1990, when the United States government made an initial investment of $240 million in order to "provide capital to private bakeries, auto shops, hair salons, and other entrepreneurial activities for a small stake in the enterprises."

The fund was run by Robert G. Faris, and the board was chaired by John P. Birkelund. Board members included National Security Advisor Zbigniew Brzezinski, GM's chairman John F. Smith Jr., and AFL–CIO's president Lane Kirkland.

In her 2017 book, Democracy: Stories from the Long Road to Freedom, former US Secretary of State Condoleezza Rice writes that the fund was "one of the most successful endeavors" to promote free enterprise in the Polish economy after the end of communism, even though it was "actually quite small in absolute dollar terms."
