= Democratic Rally (disambiguation) =

The Democratic Rally is a political party in the Republic of Cyprus.

Democratic Rally may also refer to:

- Democratic Rally (Senegal), a political party in Senegal
- Democratic Rally of the Tahitian People, a former political party in French Polynesia
- African Democratic Rally, a former political party in French West Africa and French Equatorial Africa
- Central African Democratic Rally, a political party in the Central African Republic
- Dahomeyan Democratic Rally, a former political party in Dahomey
- Martinican Democratic Rally, a political party in Martinique
- Oceanian Democratic Rally, a political party in New Caledonia

== See also ==
- National Democratic Rally (disambiguation)
- Democratic Coalition (disambiguation)
- Democratic Party (disambiguation)
- Democrat Party (disambiguation)
