= Democratic Party =

Democratic Party and similar terms may refer to:

== Active parties ==
=== Africa ===
- Democratic Party (Gambia), founded 1965
- Democratic Party (Kenya), founded 1991
- Democratic Party (Libya), founded 2011
- Democratic Party (Tanzania), founded 2002
- Democratic Party (Tunisia), founded 2016
- Democratic Party (Uganda), founded 1954
- Democratic Party (Zambia), founded 1991
- Seychelles Democratic Party (DP), founded 1964

=== Americas, the Caribbean, and U.S. territories ===
- Democratic Party (Argentina) (PD), founded 1931
- Democratic Party (Mendoza) (PD), founded 1983, Argentina
- Democratic Party of the City of Buenos Aires (PD), founded 1931, Argentina
- Democratic Party (Curaçao), founded 1944
- Democratic Party (Sint Eustatius), founded 1948
- Democratic Party Sint Maarten (DP), 1954–2017, refounded 2023
- Democratic Party (United States), founded 1828
  - Democratic Party (Puerto Rico) (DPPR), founding date unknown, affiliated with the U.S. Democratic Party
  - Democratic Party of Guam, founded 1961, affiliated with the U.S. Democratic Party
  - Democratic Party of the Northern Mariana Islands (CNMI), founded 1978, affiliated with the U.S. Democratic Party
  - Democratic Party of the Virgin Islands, founded 1936, U.S. Virgin Islands, affiliated with the U.S. Democratic Party

=== Asia ===
- Democratic Party (Indonesia) (PD), founded 2001
- Democratic Party (Mongolia), founded 2000
- Democratic Party (Myanmar), founded 1988
- Democratic Party (South Korea, 2015) (DPK or DP)
- Democrat Party (Thailand), founded 1946
- Democratic Party (Timor-Leste), founded 2001

=== Europe ===
- Democrat Party (Turkey, 2007)
- Democratic Party (Bulgaria), founded 1896
- Democratic Party (Cyprus) (DIKO), founded 1976
- Democrats (Greenland), a.k.a. the Democratic Party, founded 2002
- Democratic Party (Italy) (PD), founded 2007
- Democratic Party (Luxembourg), founded 1955
- Democratic Party (Montenegro) (DP or PD), founded 2010
- Alliance of Democrats (Poland) (a.k.a. the Democratic Party), founded 1937
- Democratic Party (Serbia) (DS), founded 1990

=== Oceania ===
(See above for U.S. territorial affiliates of the U.S. Democratic Party in Oceania.)

- Democratic Party (Cook Islands), founded 1971

== Defunct parties ==
=== Africa ===
- Democratic Party (South Africa), 1989 (or earlier) – 2000
- Democratic Party (South Africa, 1973) (merged 1977)

=== Americas and the Caribbean ===
- Democrats (Brazil) (DEM), 1985–2022
- Democratic Party (Brazil, 1926–1934)
- Democratic Party (Chile), 1932–1960
- Democratic Party (Costa Rica), c. 1919–1950
- Democratic Party (Cuba), 1942–1962
- Democratic Party (Nicaragua), 1838–1928
- Democratic Party (Peru), 1889–1933

=== Asia ===
- Democrata Party, Philippines, 1917–1941
- Democratic Party (Cambodia), 1946–1957
- Democratic Party (1912), dissolved 1913, Republic of China
- Democratic Party (Hong Kong), 1994–2025
- Democratic Party (Japan, 1947), dissolved 1950
- Democratic Party (Japan, 1954), dissolved 1955
- Democratic Party (Japan, 1996), dissolved 1998
- Democratic Party (Japan, 2016), merged 2018
- Democratic Party (Laos), 1948 – c. 1958
- Democratic Party (Philippines), 1953–1957
- Democratic Party (Singapore), 1955–1956
- Democratic Party (South Korea, 1955), dissolved 1964
- Democratic Party (South Korea, 1990), dissolved 1991
- Democratic Party (South Korea, 1991), dissolved 1995
- Democratic Party (South Korea, 1995), dissolved 1997
- Democratic Party (South Korea, 2000), dissolved 2007
- Democratic Party (South Korea, 2007), merged 2008
- Democratic Party (South Korea, 2008), merged 2011
- Democratic Party (South Korea, 2013), merged 2014
- Democratic Party (Sri Lanka), 2013–2016
- Democratic Party of Vietnam (ĐDCVN), 1944–1988, North Vietnam

=== Europe ===
- Democrat Party (Turkey, 1946–1960)
- Democratic Party (Andorra) (PD), 2001
- Democratic Party (Denmark), 2012–2015
- Democratic Party (Central Lithuania), 1922
- Democratic Party (Hungary) (DEMP), 1993–1994
- Democratic Party (Italy, 1913), dissolved 1919
- Democratic Party (Italy, 1919) (PD), dissolved 1921
- Democratic Party (Macedonia), 1993 – merged 1997
- Democratic Party (Malta), 2016–2020
- Democratic Party – demokraci.pl (PD), 2005–2016, Poland
- Democratic Party (Portugal), 1912–1926
- Democratic Party (Romania), 1993 – merged 2008
- Democratic Party (Slovakia, 1944), dissolved 1948
- Democratic Party (Slovakia, 1989) (DS), merged 2006
- Democratic Party (Spain, 1849), dissolved 1869
- Democratic Party (Spain, 1902) (PD), dissolved 1910
- Democratic Party (UK, 1942), dissolved 1961
- Democratic Party (UK, 1969), dissolved 1971
- Democratic Party (UK, 1998), dissolved 2010
- Democratic Party (Yugoslavia), 1919–1946

=== Oceania ===
- Democratic Party (1920), Australia, early 1920s
- Democratic Party (1943), Australia, dissolved 1944
- Democratic Party (Solomon Islands, historical), 1965 – c. 1966

== See also ==
- Democrat (disambiguation)
- Democracy Party (disambiguation)
- Democratic Movement (disambiguation)
- Democrat Party (disambiguation)
- The Democrat (disambiguation)
- Social Democratic Party
- United Democratic Party (disambiguation)
- Minjudang (disambiguation)
- Other similarly named (but differently named) political parties and alliances
  - Current organizations
    - Africa
      - Basotho Batho Democratic Party (BBDP), founded 2006, Lesotho
      - Botswana Democratic Party (BDP or Domkrag), founded 1962
      - Democratic Alliance (South Africa) (DA), founded 2000
      - Democratic Party of Armenia (DPA), founded 1991
      - Democratic Party of Equatorial Guinea (PDGE), founded 1987
      - Democratic Party of Ivory Coast – African Democratic Rally (PDCI-RDA), founded 1946
      - Democratic Party of Namibia (DPN), founded 2008
      - Democrats for Andorra (DA), founded 2011
      - Gabonese Democratic Party (PDG), founded 1953
      - Malawi Democratic Party (MDP), founded 2004
      - Senegalese Democratic Party (PDS), founded 1974
      - Swazi Democratic Party (SWADEPA), founded 2011, Eswatini
    - Americas and the Caribbean
      - Bonaire Democratic Party (PDB), founded 1954
      - Brazilian Democratic Movement (MDB), founded 1965, refounded 1980
      - Christian Democratic Party (El Salvador) (PDC), founded 1960
      - Democratic Choice (Dominican Republic) (OD), founded 2014
      - Democratic National Assembly (DNA), founded 2006, Trinidad and Tobago
      - Democratic Party of Nauru (DPN), founded 1987
      - Democratic Party of Trinidad and Tobago (DPTT), founded 2001
      - Democratic Progressive Party (Argentina) (PDP), founded 1914
      - New Democratic Party (NDP), founded 1961, Canada
      - Party for Democracy (Chile) (PPD), founded 1987
      - Peruvian Democratic Party (PDP), founded 2006
      - We Are Peru (Spanish: Partido Democrático Somos Perú, SP or PDSP), founded 1995
    - Asia
      - Arab Democratic Party (Lebanon) (ADP), founded 1974
      - Bet-Nahrain Democratic Party (BNDP), founded 1976, Iraq
      - Centrist Democratic Party of the Philippines (CDP), founded 2010
      - Constitutional Democratic Party of Japan (CBP or CDPJ, founded 2017, refounded 2020)
      - Democratic parties (China), the official term for the eight small non-oppositional parties in China that exist under the management of the Communist Party
      - Democratic Party of Tajikistan (DPT), founded 1990
      - Democratic Party of Turkmenistan (TDP), founded 1991
      - Democratic Party of the Philippines (DPP), founded 2010
      - Democratic Party of Ukraine, founded 1990
      - Democratic Progressive Party (DPP), founded 1986, Taiwan
      - Indonesian Democratic Party of Struggle (PDI-P), founded 1973
      - Khmer Democratic Party, Cambodia (KDP), founded 1998
      - Kurdistan Democratic Party (KDP or PDK), Iraq or Iran, founded 1946
      - Lebanese Democratic Party (LDP), founded 2001
      - Liberal Democratic Party (Japan) (LDP), founded 1955
      - Maldivian Democratic Party (MDP), founded 2001
      - Meghalaya Democratic Party (MDP), founded 2022, India
      - Nagaland Democratic Party (NDP), founded 1999, India
      - PDP–Laban, lit. 'Philippine Democratic Party-Strength of the Nation', founded 1982
      - Singapore Democratic Alliance (SDA), a political coalition, established 2001
      - Singapore Democratic Party (SDP), founded 1980
    - Europe
      - Azerbaijan Democrat Party (ADP), founded 1991
      - British Democratic Party (2013) (BDP)
      - Democratic Party of Albania (PDSH), founded 1990
      - Democratic Party of Artsakh (DA), founded 2000 or 2005, Nagorno-Karabakh
      - Democratic Party of Kosovo (PDK), founded 1999
      - Democratic Party of Turks of Macedonia (TDP), founded 1990
      - Democratic Party of Zagorje (ZDS), Croatia, founded 1997
      - Democrats 66 (D66), founded 1966, Netherlands
      - European Democratic Party (EDP), founded 2004
      - New Democratic Party of Serbia (NDSS, formerly the Democratic Party of Serbia, DSS), founded 1992
      - Norway Democrats (ND), founded 2002
      - Democratic Party of Russia, 1990, merged 2008, re-registerd 2012
      - Serb Democratic Party (Bosnia and Herzegovina) (SDS), founded 1990
      - Slovak Democratic and Christian Union – Democratic Party (SDKÚ–DS), founded 2006
      - Slovenian Democratic Party (SDS), founded 1989
      - Sweden Democrats (SD), founded 1988
      - Swiss Democrats (SD), founded 1961
    - Oceania
      - Australian Democrats (AD), founded 1977
      - Solomon Islands Democratic Party (SIDP), founded 2005
  - Defunct organizations
    - Africa
      - Dahomeyan Democratic Party (PDD), 1963–1965, Benin
      - Democratic Party of Benin (PDB), 1996 – c. 2006
      - Democratic Party of Guinea – African Democratic Rally (PDG-RDA, 1960–2006)
      - Democratic Party of Nigeria and the Cameroons, founded 1958, dissolution date unknown
      - Namibia Democratic Party, founded 1975, dissolution date unknown
      - Seoposengwe Party, formerly the Ipelegeng Democratic Party (IDP), c. 1976–1986, Namibia
      - Sudanese Democratic Party, 1945, French Sudan
    - Americas and the Caribbean
      - Anguilla Democratic Party, 1976–2005
      - Guyana Democratic Party, 1996 – c. 2001
      - Caribbean People's Democratic Party, 1956, Trinidad and Tobago
      - Democratic Action Congress (DAC), 1971 – c. 2008, Trinidad and Tobago
      - Montserrat Democratic Party (MDP), 1958 – c. 2009
      - Venezuelan Democratic Party (PDV), 1943–1945
    - Asia
      - Ädilet Democratic Party (DPA), 2004–2013, Kazakhstan
      - Democratic Party of Japan (DPJ), 1998–2016
      - Indonesian Democratic Party PDI, 1973–2003
      - Korea Democratic Party (KDP), 1945–1949, South Korea
      - Kurdish Democratic Party (Lebanon), 1960–1991
      - Malaysian Democratic Party (MDP) 1998–2008
      - New Democratic Party (South Korea) (NDP), 1967–1969 and 1969–1980
      - Reunification Democratic Party (RDP), 1987–1990, South Korea
      - Pakistan Democratic Party (PDP), 1967–2012
      - People's Liberal Democratic Party (PLDP), 2006–2025, Singapore
      - Reang Democratic Party (RDP), 1990–1993, India
    - Europe
      - Azerbaijani Democratic Party (ADP), 1945–1960
      - British Democratic Party (1979) (BDP), dissolved 1982
      - Catalan European Democratic Party (PDeCAT), 2016–2023, Spain
      - Democratic Party for a British Gibraltar (DPBG), 1975–1985
      - Democratic Party of Abkhazia, c. 1991
      - Democratic Party of Austria (DPÖ), 1945–1949
      - Democratic Party of Germany (DPD), 1947–1948
      - Democratic Party of Macedonia (DPM), c. 1994–2002
      - Democratic Party of Republika Srpska, Bosnia and Herzegovina, 2009–2013
      - Democratic Party of Slovenia, 1994–2023
      - Democratic Party of South Tyrol, 1997 – c. 2008, Italy
      - Democratic Party of the Atlantic, 1979–2015, Azores, Portugal
      - Democratic Abkhazia, 2015–2017
      - Estonian Democratic Party (EDE), 1905 – merged 1919
      - European Democrats, 1979–1992
      - Europeans United for Democracy (EUD), 2015–2017
      - German Democratic Party (DDP), 1918–1933
      - Iceland Democratic Party, 2013–2016
      - Italian Democratic Party (PDI), 1944–1947
      - Maltese Democratic Party (PDM), 1987
      - Party of Democrats, 2001–2005, San Marino
      - The Democrats (Austria), 1991 – c. 2006
      - The Democrats (Italy), 1999–2002
    - Oceana
      - Fiji Democratic Party (FDP), 2002–2005
