= New Democrats =

New Democrats may refer to:

- New Democratic Party, a social democratic party in Canada
- New Democrats (United States), the ideological centrist faction of the Democratic Party
  - New Democrat Coalition, the related caucus in the United States House of Representatives
- New Democrats (Victoria), an Australian political party
- New Democrats (Latvia), a centrist political party
- New Democrats (Mauritius)
- New Democrats (Kenya), a political party in Kenya
- The New Democrats (LND, French: Les Nouveaux Démocrates), a political party in France

== See also ==
- New Democratic Party (disambiguation)
- New Democracy (disambiguation)
- Democrat (disambiguation)
