= Demokrat Parti =

Demokrat Parti may refer to:

- Democratic Party (Northern Cyprus)
- Democrat Party (Turkey, current)
- Democratic Party (Turkey, historical)

== See also ==
- Democrat (disambiguation)
- Democrat Party (disambiguation)
- Partai Demokrat (Indonesia)
