= List of newspapers named The Democrat =

The Democrat was the name for various newspapers, especially in the U.S. for papers affiliated with the Democratic Party.

- The Democrat, a weekly newspaper published in Lithgow, New South Wales in Australia
- The Democrat (1864–1874), a newspaper in Davenport, Iowa It was succeeded by the Davenport Democrat. The Davenport Democrat and Leader was published in Davenport from 1904 – 1937
- The Democrat (1901–1910) in Honolulu, Territory of Hawaii
- The Democrat (1884–1896) in Scotland Neck, North Carolina
- The Weekly Democrat, a newspaper in Huntsville, Alabama
- The Democrat / Fayetteville Daily Democrat, predecessors of the Northwest Arkansas Democrat Gazette in Fayetteville, Arkansas

== Related names ==
- Arkansas Democrat in Little Rock, Arkansas
- Tallahassee Democrat in Tallahassee, Florida
- Corning Democrat in Corning, New York, a predecessor to The Leader
- Cullman Democrat (1900–1961) in Cullman, Alabama
- Valentine Democrat in Valentine, Nebraska
- Polk County Democrat in Polk County, Florida

== See also ==
- List of defunct newspapers of the United States
