= Party for Democracy and Progress =

Party for Democracy and Progress may refer to:

- Party for Democracy and Social Progress, a political party in Benin.
- Party for Democracy and Progress (Burkina Faso)
- Party for Democracy and Progress / Socialist Party, a political party in Burkina-Faso.
- Party for Democracy and Progress (Mali)
- Party for Democracy and Progress (Tanzania)

== See also ==
- Party for Democracy (disambiguation)
