= National Democratic Rally =

National Democratic Rally may refer to:

- National Democratic Rally (Senegal)
- National Democratic Rally (Syria)
- National Rally for Democracy (Algeria)

== See also ==
- Democratic Rally (disambiguation)
