= Mr. Democracy =

"Mr. Democracy" is a nickname primarily given to individuals who have contributed to the advancement of democracy.

Mr. Democracy may also refer to:

== People with the nickname ==
- John Dewey (1859–1952), American philosopher and educational reformer
- Kim Young-sam, President of Republic of Korea (South Korea, 1993–1998)
- Martin Lee, member of the Legislative Council of Hong Kong (1998–2008)
- Lee Teng-hui (1923–2020), President of the Republic of China (Taiwan, 1988–2000)

== Other uses ==
- May Fourth Movement and New Culture Movement, the reform-minded Chinese people at the time insisted on modernizing China by adopting Western ideals of "Mr. Science" (賽先生; 赛先生; Sài xiānsheng) and "Mr. Democracy" (德先生; Dé xiānsheng).

== See also ==
- Democrat (disambiguation)
- Democracy Manifest
- Sam Rayburn (1882–1961), Speaker of the United States House of Representatives, whose nickname was "Mr. Democrat".
