= Demokrat =

Demokrat means "democrat/democratic" in some languages. It may refer to:

- Buffalo Demokrat – American german-language newspaper
- Der Demokrat – German language newspaper in Davenport, Iowa
- Demokrat Leonov (1926–1969), Soviet Border Troops colonel
- Demokrat Parti (disambiguation)
- Nashviller Demokrat – German language newspaper in Nashville, Tennessee
- Philadelphia Demokrat – German-language morning paper in Philadelphia, Pennsylvania, 1838 to 1918
