= Democrat Gulch =

Ridge in Josephine County, Oregon, US

Coordinates: 42.1226154°N 123.5583979°W

Democrat Gulch [elevation: 1,470 feet (450 m)] is a ridge in Josephine County, Oregon, in the United States.

Democrat Gulch was named from the fact a large share of early prospectors there were Democrats in politics.
