= The Bangkok Chronicle =

Defunct newspaper in Bangkok, Thailand

- 8 December 1941 issue of The Bangkok Chronicle
- Type: Daily newspaper
- Editor: Sivaram Madhvan
- Founded: 5 September 1939
- Ceased publication: 21 August 1945
- Language: English
- Headquarters: Bangkok, Thailand

The Bangkok Chronicle was the only English-language newspaper in Bangkok published throughout World War II. Its editor was Mr. Sivaram Madhvan. The Bangkok Chronicle was banned by the Thai government on 21 August 1945. A few days later, it appeared under the new name Democracy with a new publisher, but the same staff. This newspaper was published from 1 September 1945 until 31 January 1947.

The Bangkok Chronicle was preceded by The Siam Chronicle that was started in May 1936, renamed The Thai Chronicle in July 1939 until it changed its name again in September 1939 for The Bangkok Chronicle. Its first editor and director was Phya Prijanusasana.

== Image gallery ==
The Siam Chronicle, Monday 30 January 1939

The Thai Chronicle, Monday 10 July 1939

Democracy, Monday 10 June 1946

== See also ==
- Timeline of English-language newspapers published in Thailand
- List of online newspaper archives - Thailand
