= Democratic Abkhazia =

Democratic Abkhazia Идемократиатәу Аԥсны
- Leader: Astamur Logua
- Founded: 23 December 2015
- Dissolved: 1 February 2017

Democratic Abkhazia (Abkhaz: Идемократиатәу Аԥсны) was a political party in Abkhazia.

== Foundation ==
Democratic Abkhazia held its founding congress on 23 December 2015. The congress elected as its first Chairman Astamur Logua, formerly head of the youth wing of the Social-Democratic Party of Abkhazia, and Aleksandr Tsyshba, Oleg Minosyan, and Tamaz Khashba as Deputy Chairmen. Democratic Abkhazia positions itself as a centrist party, favouring the introduction of a mixed electoral system.

On 4 March 2016, Democratic Abkhazia rejected as inexpedient a planned referendum to hold an early presidential election.

On 1 February 2017, the Ministry for Justice invalidated Democratic Abkhazia's registration.
