= Democrat, California =

Democrat Hill
- Former settlement
- Location in California
- Coordinates: 39°17′00″N 120°46′46″W
- Country: United States
- State: California
- County: Nevada County
- Elevation: 4,170 ft (1,271 m)

Democrat, originally Democrat Hill, is a former settlement in Nevada County, California. It lays on the Chalk Bluff ridge, about 1 mile south of what is now Highway 20, about 6 miles southeast of the town of Washington and about 1 mile east of Remington Hill. Its elevation was 4,170 feet (1,271 m). It lays on a gold bearing gravel channel on the Chalk Bluff Ridge, which lies between Steephollow and Greenhorn Creeks, tributaries of the Bear River. As the channel runs southwest, it joins a major channel running from the San Juan Ridge easterly through Red Dog and You Bet into Placer County.

It was established in 1856 as Democrat Hill by miners who struck it rich in the area. As a local newspaper reported:

"[N]ew diggings have been struck about a mile from Remington Hill, that are exceeding (sic) rich. Three men took out four ounces and four dollars in one day, in addition to paying water money. The diggings have been named Democrat Hill."

The extent of subsequent mining activity is unclear. In 1874, Raymond reported drift and hydraulic mining in the area. In 1880, the Wick Brothers were working a small hydraulic claim there. Hydraulic mining largely disappeared In California following the Sawyer decision in 1884.

Democrat Hill appears on J. G. Hartwell's 1880 map of Nevada County and in its list of mines. On the 1898 Colfax quadrangle map and on the 1909 California State Mining Bureau map of Nevada County, it appears as Democrat. The author has been unable to find any explanation for the origin of the name or the dropping of "Hill", but presumably the name alludes to the political affiliation of the 1856 miners.

Presently, the area is in a remote and largely uninhabited part of the Tahoe National Forest.
