= Democratic Party of Nigeria and the Cameroons =

Nigerian political party

Democratic Party of Nigeria and the Cameroons was a Nigerian political party formed in August 1958. The party was an offshoot of a N.C.N.C reform committee headed by Tobi Izedonmi which waged an unsuccessful challenge to the leadership of Nnamdi Azikiwe. The resulting schism with the political leaders of the dominant Igbo party did not translate to overwhelming grass root support. However, the party was considerably known in the Orlu and Onitsha districts.
