= Democracy Now (disambiguation) =

Democracy Now! is an American independent news program

Democracy Now may also refer to:

- Democracy Now (East Germany), political movement during the collapse of communism
- Democracy Now (Ireland), proposed political alliance in the 2011 general election
