= Reang Democratic Party =

Reang Democratic Party was a political party in Mizoram, India, working for a Reang Autonomous District Council in southern Mizoram.

On October 3, 1990, Bru leaders such as Chawngzika and Sawibunga conferred with Tripura's Bru/Reang leaders and recommended the formation of the first political party of the Bru/Reang community, the Reang Democratic Party. Swaibunga Reang was the president of RDP. RDP merged with the Bharatiya Janata Party on 4 October 1993.

The party is now defunct and no longer exists as a formal political entity.
