= Condoleezza Rice =

American diplomat and political scientist (born 1954)

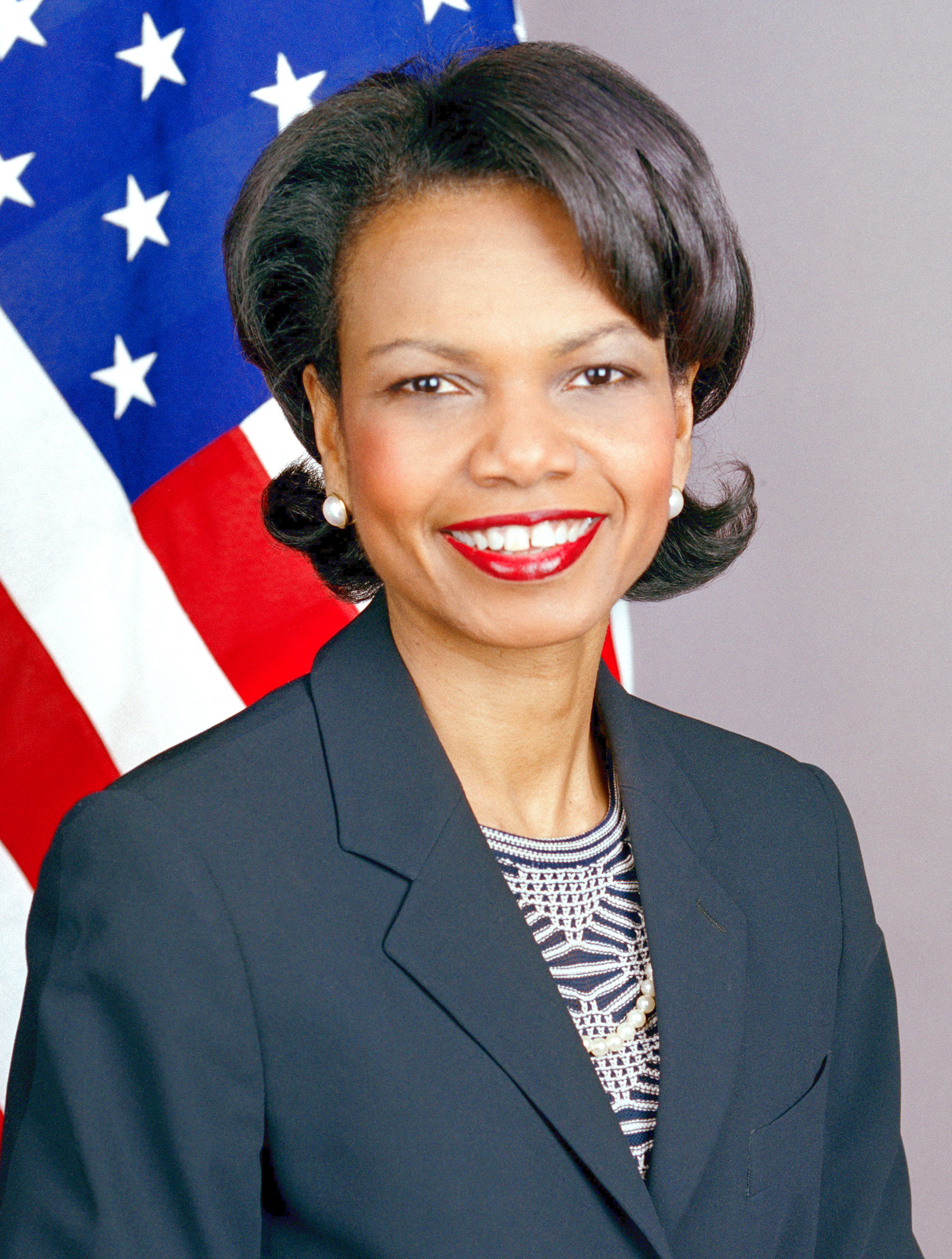
- Official portrait, 2005

8th Director of the Hoover Institution
- Incumbent
- Assumed office September 1, 2020
- President: Marc Tessier-Lavigne; Jonathan Levin
- Preceded by: Thomas W. Gilligan

66th United States Secretary of State
- In office January 26, 2005 – January 20, 2009
- President: George W. Bush
- Deputy: Richard Armitage; Robert Zoellick; John Negroponte
- Preceded by: Colin Powell
- Succeeded by: Hillary Clinton

19th United States National Security Advisor
- In office January 20, 2001 – January 26, 2005
- President: George W. Bush
- Deputy: Stephen Hadley
- Preceded by: Sandy Berger
- Succeeded by: Stephen Hadley

10th Provost of Stanford University
- In office September 1, 1993 – June 30, 1999
- President: Gerhard Casper
- Preceded by: Gerald Lieberman
- Succeeded by: John L. Hennessy

Personal details
- Born: November 14, 1954 (age 72) Birmingham, Alabama, U.S.
- Party: Republican
- Education: University of Denver (BA, PhD); University of Notre Dame (MA)
- Scientific career
- Fields: Political science
- Workplaces: Stanford University
- Thesis: The Politics of Client Command: Party-Military Relations in Czechoslovakia, 1948–1975 (1981)
- Rice's voice Rice testifying before the House Foreign Affairs Committee on the FY2008 Department of State budget Recorded February 7, 2007

Condoleezza "Condi" Rice (/ˌkɒndəˈliːzə/ KON-də-LEE-zə; born November 14, 1954) is an American diplomat and political scientist who served as the 66th United States secretary of state from 2005 to 2009 and as the 19th U.S. national security advisor from 2001 to 2005. Since 2020, she has served as the 8th director of Stanford University's Hoover Institution.

A member of the Republican Party, Rice was the first female African-American secretary of state and the first woman to serve as national security advisor. Until the election of Barack Obama as president in 2008, Rice and her predecessor, Colin Powell, were the highest-ranking African Americans in the history of the federal executive branch (by virtue of the secretary of state standing fourth in the presidential line of succession). At the time of her appointment as Secretary of State, Rice was the highest-ranking woman in the history of the United States to be in the presidential line of succession.

Rice was born in Birmingham, Alabama, and grew up while the South was racially segregated. She obtained her bachelor's degree from the University of Denver and her master's degree from the University of Notre Dame, both in political science. In 1981, she received a PhD from the School of International Studies at the University of Denver. She worked at the State Department under the Carter administration and served on the National Security Council as the Soviet and Eastern Europe affairs advisor to President George H. W. Bush during the dissolution of the Soviet Union and German reunification from 1989 to 1991. Rice later pursued an academic fellowship at Stanford University, where she served as provost from 1993 to 1999. On December 17, 2000, she joined the George W. Bush administration as national security advisor. In Bush's second term, she succeeded Colin Powell as Secretary of State, thereby becoming the first African-American woman, second African-American after Powell, and second woman after Madeleine Albright to hold this office.

Following her confirmation as secretary of state, Rice pioneered the policy of Transformational Diplomacy directed toward expanding the number of responsible democratic governments in the world and especially in the Greater Middle East. That policy faced challenges as Hamas captured a popular majority in Palestinian elections, and influential countries including Saudi Arabia and Egypt maintained authoritarian systems (with U.S. backing). While in the position, she chaired the Millennium Challenge Corporation's board of directors. In March 2009, Rice returned to Stanford University as a political science professor and the Thomas and Barbara Stephenson Senior Fellow on Public Policy at the Hoover Institution. In September 2010, she became a faculty member of the Stanford Graduate School of Business and a director of its Global Center for Business and the Economy. In January 2020, it was announced that Rice would succeed Thomas W. Gilligan as the next director of the Hoover Institution on September 1, 2020. She is currently serving as a director for C3 AI and Makena Capital Management; she had also served on the board of Dropbox from 2014 to 2021.

== Early life ==
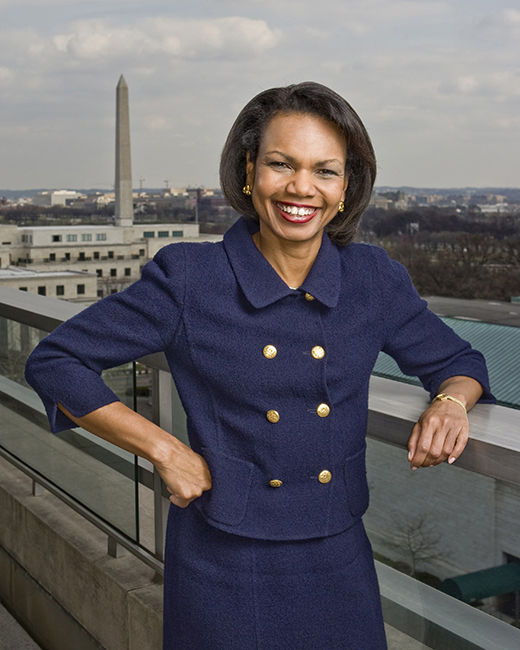
Condoleezza Rice in 2008

Rice was born in Birmingham, Alabama, the only child of Angelena (née Ray) Rice, a high school science, music, and oratory teacher, and John Wesley Rice Jr., a high school guidance counselor, Presbyterian minister, and dean of students at Stillman College, a historically black college in Tuscaloosa, Alabama. Her name, Condoleezza, derives from the music term con dolcezza (Italian for 'sweetly, softly', lit. 'with sweetness'). Rice has roots in the American South going back to the pre–Civil War era, and some of her ancestors worked as sharecroppers for a time after emancipation. Rice discovered on the PBS series Finding Your Roots that she is of 51% African, 40% European, and 9% Asian or Native American genetic descent, while her mtDNA is traced back to the Tikar people of Cameroon.

In her 2017 book, Democracy: Stories from the Long Road to Freedom, she writes, "My great-great-grandmother Zina on my mother's side bore five children by different slave owners" and "My great-grandmother on my father's side, Julia Head, carried the name of the slave owner and was so favored by him that he taught her to read." Rice grew up in the Titusville neighborhood of Birmingham, and then Tuscaloosa, Alabama, at a time when the South was racially segregated. The Rices lived on the campus of Stillman College.

Rice began to learn French, music, figure skating and ballet at the age of three. At the age of 15, she began piano classes with the goal of becoming a concert pianist.

=== Education ===
In 1967, the family moved to Denver, Colorado. She attended St. Mary's Academy, an all-girls Catholic high school in Cherry Hills Village, Colorado, and graduated at age 16 in 1971. Rice enrolled at the University of Denver, where her father worked at the time.

Rice initially majored in music, and after her sophomore year, she went to the Aspen Music Festival and School. There, she later said, she met students of greater talent than herself, and she doubted her career prospects as a pianist. She began to consider an alternative major. She attended an International Politics course taught by Josef Korbel, which sparked her interest in the Soviet Union and international relations. Rice later described Korbel (who is the father of Madeleine Albright, then a future U.S. secretary of state), as a central figure in her life.

In 1974, at age 19, Rice was inducted into Phi Beta Kappa society, and was awarded a B.A. degree cum laude in political science by the University of Denver. While at the University of Denver she was a member of Alpha Chi Omega, Gamma Delta chapter. She obtained an MA degree in political science from the University of Notre Dame in 1975. She first worked in the State Department in 1977, during the Carter administration, as an intern in the Bureau of Educational and Cultural Affairs. She also studied Russian at Moscow State University in the summer of 1979, and interned with the RAND Corporation in Santa Monica, California. In 1981, at age 26, she received her PhD in political science from the Josef Korbel School of International Studies at the University of Denver. Her dissertation centered on military policy and politics in what was then the communist state of Czechoslovakia.

From 1980 to 1981, she was a fellow at Stanford University's Arms Control and Disarmament Program, having won a Ford Foundation Dual Expertise Fellowship in Soviet Studies and International Security. Rice was one of only four women—along with Janne E. Nolan, Cindy Roberts, and Gloria Duffy—studying international security at Stanford on fellowships at the time. Her fellowship at Stanford began her academic affiliation with the university and time in Northern California.

=== Early political views ===
Rice was a Democrat until 1982, when she changed her political affiliation to Republican, in part because she disagreed with the foreign policy of Democratic President Jimmy Carter, and because of the influence of her father, who was Republican. At the 2000 Republican National Convention, she said "My father joined our party because the Democrats in Jim Crow Alabama of 1952 would not register him to vote. The Republicans did."

== Academic career ==
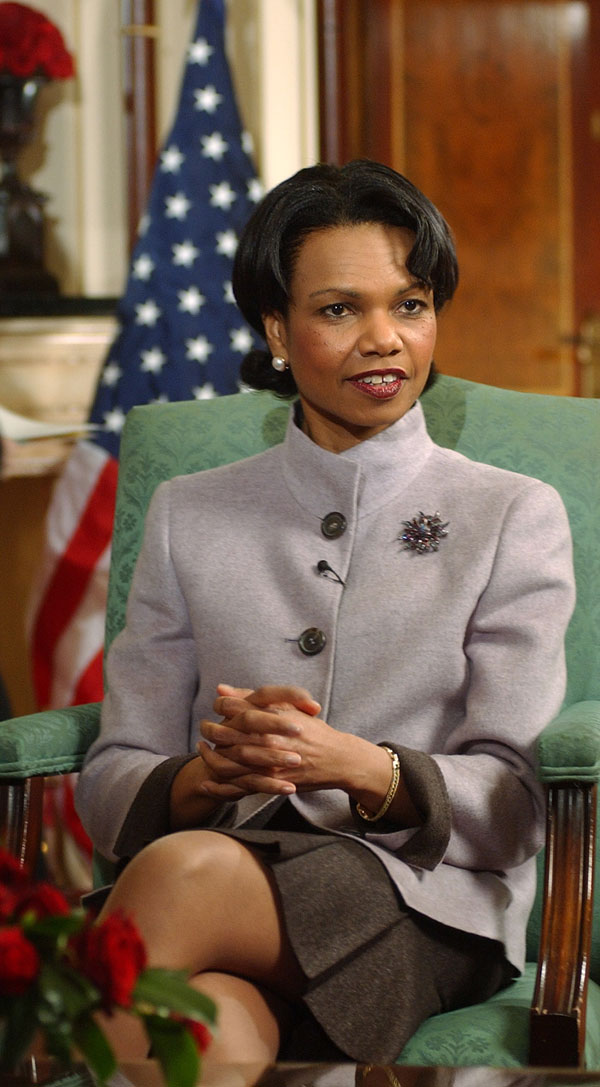
Condoleezza Rice during a 2005 interview on ITV in London

Rice was hired by Stanford University as an assistant professor of political science (1981–1987). She was promoted to associate professor in 1987, a post she held until 1993. She was a specialist on the Soviet Union and gave lectures on the subject for the Berkeley-Stanford joint program led by UC Berkeley professor George W. Breslauer in the mid-1980s.

At a 1985 meeting of arms control experts at Stanford, Rice's performance drew the attention of Brent Scowcroft, who had served as National Security Advisor under Gerald Ford. With the election of George H. W. Bush, Scowcroft returned to the White House as National Security Adviser in 1989, and he asked Rice to become his Soviet expert on the United States National Security Council. According to R. Nicholas Burns, President Bush was "captivated" by Rice, and relied heavily on her advice in his dealings with Mikhail Gorbachev and Boris Yeltsin.

Because she would have been ineligible for tenure at Stanford if she had been absent for more than two years, she returned there in 1991. She was taken under the wing of George Shultz (Ronald Reagan's secretary of state from 1982 to 1989), who was a fellow at the Hoover Institution. Shultz included Rice in a "luncheon club" of intellectuals who met every few weeks to discuss foreign affairs. In 1992, Shultz, who was a board member of Chevron Corporation, recommended Rice for a spot on the Chevron board. Chevron was pursuing a $10 billion development project in Kazakhstan and, as a Soviet specialist, Rice knew the president of Kazakhstan, Nursultan Nazarbayev. She traveled to Kazakhstan on Chevron's behalf and, in honor of her work, in 1993, Chevron named a 129,000-ton supertanker SS Condoleezza Rice. During this period, Rice was also appointed to the boards of Transamerica Corporation (1991) and Hewlett-Packard (1992).

=== Provost promotion ===
At Stanford, in 1992, Rice volunteered to serve on the search committee to replace outgoing president Donald Kennedy. The committee ultimately recommended Gerhard Casper, the provost of the University of Chicago. Casper met Rice during this search, and was so impressed that in 1993, he appointed her as Stanford's provost, the chief budget and academic officer of the university in 1993 and she also was granted tenure and became full professor. Rice was the first female, first African-American, and youngest provost in Stanford's history. She was also named a senior fellow of the Institute for International Studies, and a senior fellow (by courtesy) of the Hoover Institution.

Former Stanford president Gerhard Casper said the university was "most fortunate in persuading someone of Professor Rice's exceptional talents and proven ability in critical situations to take on this task. Everything she has done, she has done well; I have every confidence that she will continue that record as provost." Acknowledging Rice's unique character, Casper told The New Yorker in 2002 that it "would be disingenuous for me to say that the fact that she was a woman, the fact that she was black and the fact that she was young weren't in my mind."

As Stanford's provost, Rice was responsible for managing the university's multibillion-dollar budget. The school at that time was running a deficit of $20 million. When Rice took office, she promised that the budget would be balanced within "two years." Coit Blacker, Stanford's deputy director of the Institute for International Studies, said there "was a sort of conventional wisdom that said it couldn't be done ... that [the deficit] was structural, that we just had to live with it." Two years later, Rice announced that the deficit had been eliminated and the university was holding a record surplus of over $14.5 million.

Rice drew protests when, as the provost, she departed from the practice of applying affirmative action to tenure decisions and unsuccessfully sought to consolidate the university's ethnic community centers.

=== Return to Stanford ===
During a farewell interview in early December 2008, Rice indicated she would return to Stanford and the Hoover Institution, "back west of the Mississippi where I belong," but beyond writing and teaching did not specify what her role would be. Rice's plans for a return to campus were elaborated in an interview with the Stanford Report in January 2009. She returned to Stanford as a political science professor and senior fellow at the Hoover Institution on March 1, 2009. Condoleezza Rice is currently the Denning Professor in Global Business and the Economy at the Stanford Graduate School of Business; the Thomas and Barbara Stephenson Senior Fellow on Public Policy at the Hoover Institution; and a professor of political science at Stanford University.

== Role in nuclear strategy ==
In 1986, Rice was appointed special assistant to the director of the Joint Chiefs of Staff to work on nuclear strategic planning as part of a Council on Foreign Relations fellowship. In 2005, Rice assumed office as Secretary of State. Rice played an important role in trying to stop the nuclear threat from North Korea and Iran.

=== North Korea ===
North Korea signed the Nuclear Non-Proliferation Treaty in 1985, but in 2002, it was revealed that they were operating a secret nuclear weapons program that violated the 1994 agreement. The 1994 agreement between the United States and North Korea included North Korea agreeing to freeze and eventually dismantle its graphite moderated nuclear reactors, in exchange for international aid which would help them to build two new light-water nuclear reactors. In 2003, North Korea officially withdrew from the Non-Proliferation Treaty. Rice played a key role in the idea of "six-party talks" that brought China, Japan, Russia, and South Korea into discussion with North Korea and the United States.

During these discussions, Rice gave strong talks to urge North Korea to dismantle their nuclear power program. In 2005, North Korea agreed to give up its entire nuclear program in exchange for security guarantees and economic benefits to ensure its survival. Despite the agreement in 2005, in 2006, North Korea test fired long range missiles. The UN Security Council demanded North Korea suspend the program. In 2007, Rice was involved in another nuclear agreement with North Korea (Pyongyang). Rice, other negotiators for the United States and four other nations (six-party talks) reached a deal with North Korea. In this deal North Korea agreed to close its main nuclear reactor in exchange for $400 million in fuel and aid.

=== India ===
In 2006, Indian prime minister Manmohan Singh announced the Agreement for Cooperation between the United States and India involving peaceful uses of nuclear energy. As Secretary of State, Rice was involved in the negotiation of this agreement and declared "India's society is open and free, transparent and stable. Its multiethnic and multi-religious democracy is characterized by individual freedom and the rule of law. We share common values...India is a rising global power that can be a pillar of stability in a rapidly changing Asia. India is, in short, a natural partner for the United States."

== Private sector ==
Rice headed Chevron's committee on public policy until she resigned on January 15, 2001, to become National Security Advisor to President George W. Bush. Chevron honored Rice by naming an oil tanker Condoleezza Rice after her, but controversy led to its being renamed Altair Voyager.

Rice has served as an instructor at MIT Seminar XXI. She also served on the board of directors for the Carnegie Corporation, Charles Schwab Corporation, Chevron Corporation, Hewlett-Packard, Rand Corporation, Transamerica Corporation, and other organizations.

In 1992, Rice founded the Center for New Generation, an after-school program created to raise the high school graduation numbers of East Palo Alto and eastern Menlo Park, California. After her tenure as secretary of state, Rice was approached in February 2009 to fill an open position as a Pac-10 Commissioner, but chose instead to return to Stanford University as a political science professor and the Thomas and Barbara Stephenson Senior Fellow on Public Policy at the Hoover Institution.

In 2014, Rice joined the Ban Bossy campaign as a spokesperson advocating leadership roles for girls.

On July 11, 2022, the Denver Broncos announced that Rice had joined the Walton-Penner ownership group (consisting of S. Robson Walton, Greg Penner, Carrie Walton Penner, Mellody Hobson, and Sir Lewis Hamilton), which recently agreed to buy the NFL team for $4.65 billion. On August 9, 2022, the NFL owners approved the purchase of the Denver Broncos by the Walton-Penner group.

== Early political career ==
In 1986, while an international affairs fellow of the Council on Foreign Relations, Rice served as special assistant to the director of the Joint Chiefs of Staff.

From 1989 through March 1991 (the period of the fall of Berlin Wall and the final days of the Soviet Union), she served in President George H. W. Bush's administration as director, and then senior director, of Soviet and East European affairs in the National Security Council, and a special assistant to the president for national security affairs. In this position, Rice wrote what would become known as the "Chicken Kiev speech" in which Bush advised the Verkhovna Rada, Ukraine's parliament, against independence. She also helped develop Bush's and Secretary of State James Baker's policies in favor of German reunification. She impressed Bush, who later introduced her to Soviet leader Mikhail Gorbachev, as the one who "tells me everything I know about the Soviet Union."

In 1991, Rice returned to her teaching position at Stanford, although she continued to serve as a consultant on the former Soviet Bloc for numerous clients in both the public and private sectors. Late that year, California governor Pete Wilson appointed her to a bipartisan committee that had been formed to draw new state legislative and congressional districts in the state.

In 1997, she served on the Federal Advisory Committee on Gender-Integrated Training in the Military.

During George W. Bush's 2000 presidential election campaign, Rice took a one-year leave of absence from Stanford University to serve as his foreign policy advisor. The group of advisors she led called itself the Vulcans in honor of the monumental Vulcan statue, which sits on a hill overlooking her hometown of Birmingham, Alabama. Rice would later go on to give a noteworthy speech at the 2000 Republican National Convention. The speech asserted that "... America's armed forces are not a global police force. They are not the world's 911."

== National Security Advisor (2001–2005) ==
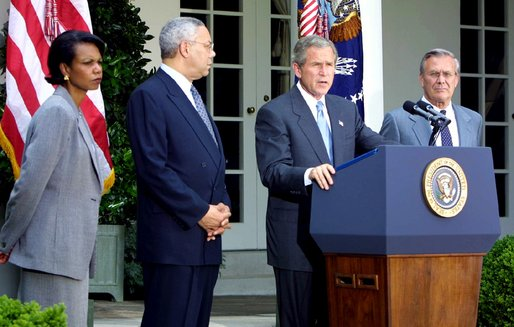
Rice, Secretary of State Colin Powell, and Secretary of Defense Donald Rumsfeld listen to President George W. Bush speak about the Middle East on June 24, 2002.

On December 16, 2000, Rice was named as National Security Advisor, upon which she stepped down from her position at Stanford. She was the first woman to occupy the post. Rice earned the nickname of "Warrior Princess", reflecting strong nerve and delicate manners.

On January 18, 2003, The Washington Post reported that Rice was involved in crafting Bush's position on race-based preferences. Rice has stated that "while race-neutral means are preferable", race can be taken into account as "one factor among others" in university admissions policies.

=== Terrorism ===
During the summer of 2001, Rice met with CIA director George Tenet to discuss the possibilities and prevention of terrorist attacks on American targets. On July 10, 2001, Rice met with Tenet in what he referred to as an "emergency meeting" held at the White House at Tenet's request to brief Rice and the NSC staff about the potential threat of an impending al Qaeda attack. Rice responded by asking Tenet to give a presentation on the matter to Secretary Donald Rumsfeld and Attorney General John Ashcroft.

Rice characterized the August 6, 2001, President's Daily Brief Bin Ladin Determined To Strike in US as historical information. Rice indicated "It was information based on old reporting." Sean Wilentz of Salon magazine suggested that the PDB contained current information based on continuing investigations, including that Bin Laden wanted to "bring the fighting to America." On September 11, 2001, Rice was scheduled to outline a new national security policy that included missile defense as a cornerstone and played down the threat of stateless terrorism.

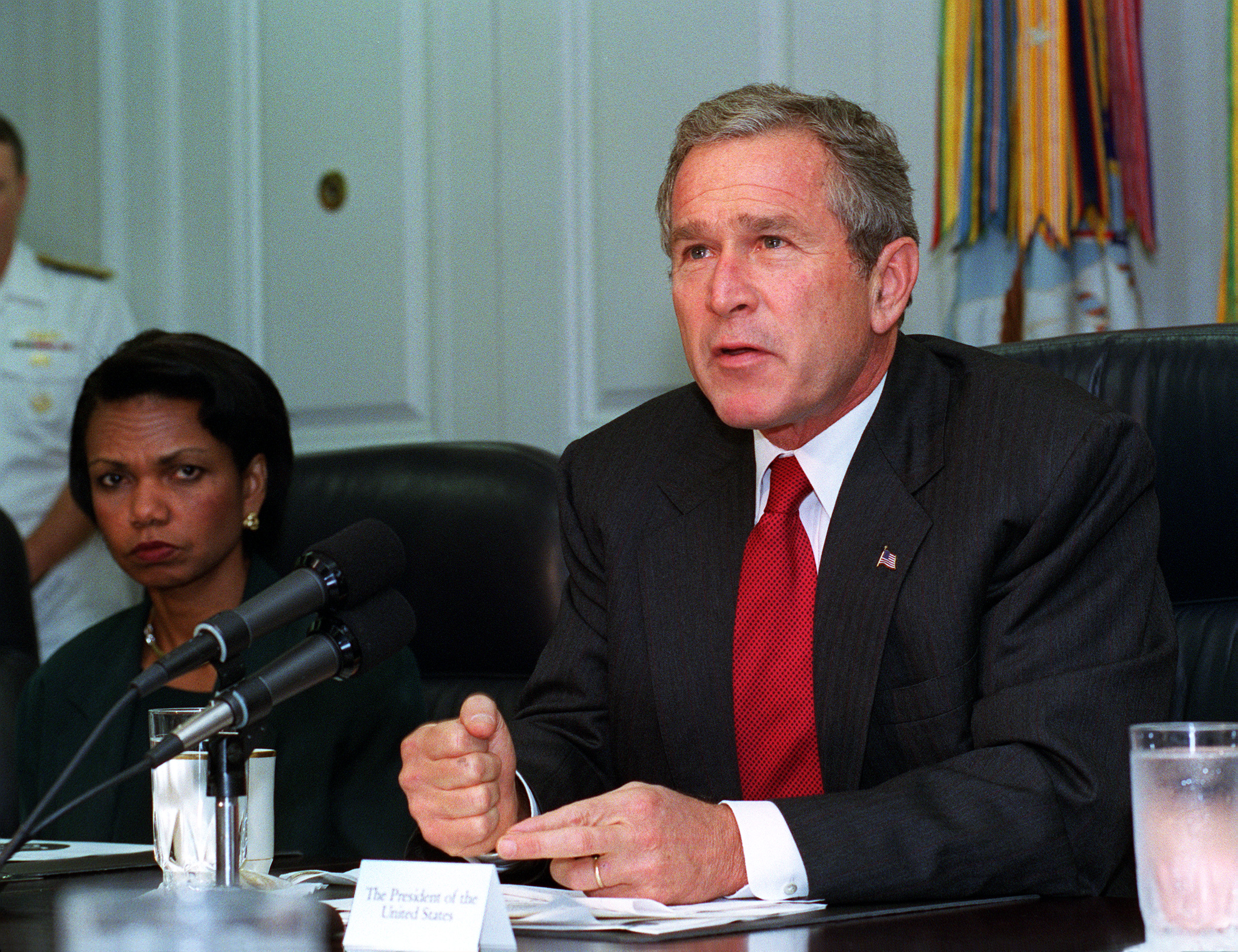
President Bush addresses the media at the Pentagon on September 17, 2001.

When asked in 2006 about the July 2001 meeting, Rice asserted she did not recall the specific meeting, commenting that she had met repeatedly with Tenet that summer about terrorist threats. Moreover, she stated that it was "incomprehensible" to her that she had ignored terrorist threats two months before the September 11 attacks.

In 2003, Rice received the U.S. Senator John Heinz Award for Greatest Public Service by an Elected or Appointed Official, an award given out annually by Jefferson Awards.

In August 2010, Rice received the U.S. Air Force Academy's 2009 Thomas D. White National Defense Award for contributions to the defense and security of the United States.

=== Subpoenas ===
In March 2004, Rice declined to testify before the National Commission on Terrorist Attacks Upon the United States (the 9/11 Commission). The White House claimed executive privilege under constitutional separation of powers and cited past tradition. Under pressure, Bush agreed to allow her to testify so long as it did not create a precedent of presidential staff being required to appear before Congress when so requested. In April 2007, Rice rejected, on grounds of executive privilege, a House subpoena regarding the prewar claim that Iraq sought yellowcake uranium from Niger.

=== Iraq ===
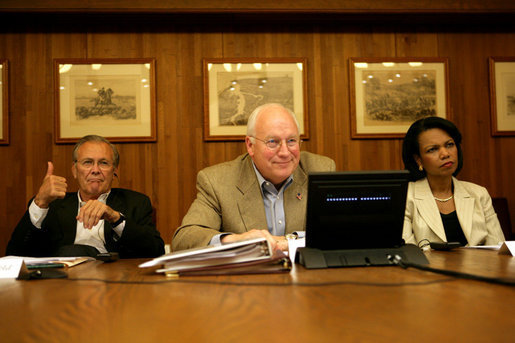
Cheney, Rice and Rumsfeld participate in a video conference with President Bush and Iraqi PM Maliki in 2006.

Rice was a proponent of the 2003 invasion of Iraq. After Iraq delivered its declaration of weapons of mass destruction to the United Nations on December 8, 2002, Rice wrote an editorial for The New York Times entitled "Why We Know Iraq Is Lying". In a January 10, 2003, interview with CNN's Wolf Blitzer, Rice made headlines by stating regarding Iraqi president Saddam Hussein's nuclear capabilities: "The problem here is that there will always be some uncertainty about how quickly he can acquire nuclear weapons. But we don't want the smoking gun to be a mushroom cloud."

In October 2003, Rice was named to run the Iraq Stabilization Group, to "quell violence in Iraq and Afghanistan and to speed the reconstruction of both countries." By May 2004, The Washington Post reported that the council had become virtually nonexistent.

Leading up to the 2004 presidential election, Rice became the first National Security Advisor to campaign for an incumbent president. She stated that while: "Saddam Hussein had nothing to do with the actual attacks on America, Saddam Hussein's Iraq was a part of the Middle East that was festering and unstable, [and] was part of the circumstances that created the problem on September 11."

After the invasion, when it became clear that Iraq did not have nuclear WMD capability, critics called Rice's claims a "hoax", "deception" and "demagogic scare tactic". Dana Milbank and Mike Allen wrote in The Washington Post: "Either she missed or overlooked numerous warnings from intelligence agencies seeking to put caveats on claims about Iraq's nuclear weapons program, or she made public claims that she knew to be false".

=== Role in authorizing use of torture ===
A Senate Intelligence Committee reported that on July 17, 2002, Rice met with CIA director George Tenet to personally convey the Bush administration's approval of the proposed waterboarding of alleged Al Qaeda leader Abu Zubaydah. "Days after Dr Rice gave Mr Tenet her approval, the Justice Department approved the use of waterboarding in a top secret August 1 memo." Waterboarding is considered to be torture by a wide range of authorities, including legal experts, war veterans, intelligence officials, military judges, human rights organizations, former U.S. attorney general Eric Holder, and many senior politicians, including former U.S. president Barack Obama.

In 2003 Rice, Vice President Dick Cheney and Attorney General John Ashcroft met with the CIA again and were briefed on the use of waterboarding and other methods including week-long sleep deprivation, forced nudity and the use of stress positions. The Senate report says that the Bush administration officials "reaffirmed that the CIA program was lawful and reflected administration policy".

The Senate report also "suggests Miss Rice played a more significant role than she acknowledged in written testimony to the Senate Armed Services Committee submitted in the autumn." At that time, she had acknowledged attending meetings to discuss the CIA's use of torture, but she claimed that she could not recall the details, and she "omitted her direct role in approving the program in her written statement to the committee."

In a conversation with a student at Stanford University in April 2009, Rice stated that she did not authorize the CIA to use the torture. Rice said, "I didn't authorize anything. I conveyed the authorization of the administration to the agency that they had policy authorization, subject to the Justice Department's clearance. That's what I did." She added, "We were told, nothing that violates our obligations under the Convention Against Torture. And so, by definition, if it was authorized by the president, it did not violate our obligations under the Conventions Against Torture."

In 2015, citing her role in authorizing the use of so-called "enhanced interrogation techniques", Human Rights Watch called for the investigation of Rice "for conspiracy to torture as well as other crimes."

== Secretary of State (2005–2009) ==
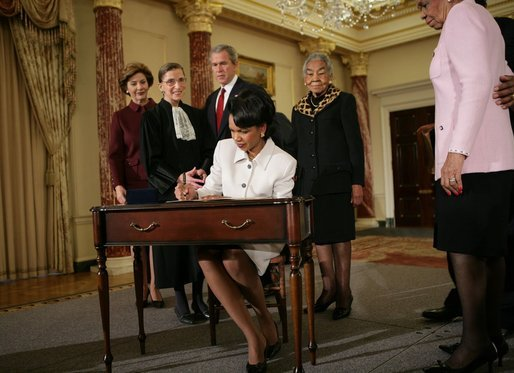
Rice signs official papers after receiving the oath of office during her ceremonial swearing in at the Department of State. Watching are, from left, Laura Bush, Justice Ruth Bader Ginsburg, President George W. Bush.

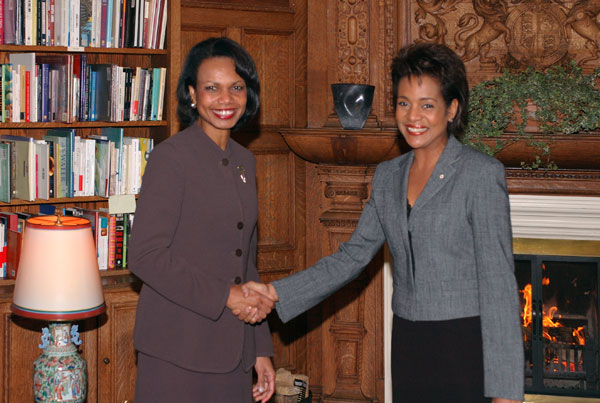
Condoleezza Rice visits Governor General of Canada Michaëlle Jean in Ottawa, Ontario.

On November 16, 2004, Bush nominated Rice to be Secretary of State. On January 26, 2005, the Senate confirmed her nomination by a vote of 85–13. The negative votes, the most cast against any nomination for Secretary of State since 1825, came from Senators who, according to Senator Barbara Boxer, wanted "to hold Dr. Rice and the Bush administration accountable for their failures in Iraq and in the war on terrorism." Their reasoning was that Rice had acted irresponsibly in equating Saddam's regime with Islamist terrorism and some could not accept her previous record. Senator Robert Byrd, a prominent Senate institutionalist who was concerned with executive over-reach, voted against Rice's appointment, indicating that she "has asserted that the President holds far more of the war power than the Constitution grants him."

As Secretary of State, Rice championed the expansion of democratic governments and other American values: "American values are universal." "An international order that reflects our values is the best guarantee of our enduring national interest ..." Rice stated that the September 11 attacks in 2001 were rooted in "oppression and despair" and so, the U.S. must advance democratic reform and support basic rights throughout the greater Middle East.

Rice also reformed and restructured the department, as well as U.S. diplomacy as a whole. "Transformational Diplomacy" is the goal that Rice describes as "work[ing] with our many partners around the world ... [and] build[ing] and sustain[ing] democratic, well-governed states that will respond to the needs of their people and conduct themselves responsibly in the international system."

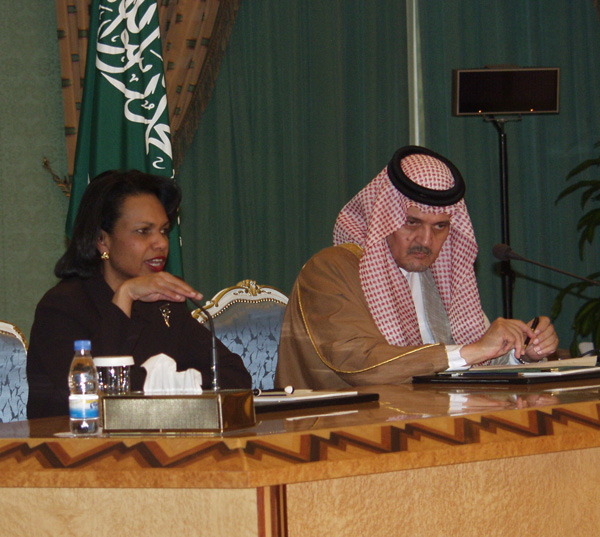
Rice with Saudi Arabian Foreign Minister Saud al-Faisal in 2006

As Secretary of State, Rice traveled heavily and initiated many diplomatic efforts on behalf of the Bush administration; she holds the record for most miles logged in the position. Her diplomacy relied on strong presidential support and is considered to be the continuation of style defined by former Republican secretaries of state Henry Kissinger and James Baker.

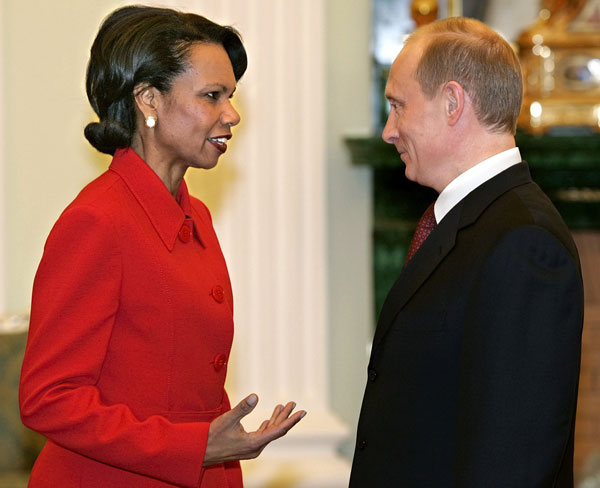
Condoleezza Rice speaks with Vladimir Putin during her April 2005 trip to Russia.

== Post-Bush administration ==
After the end of the Bush Administration, Rice returned to academia and joined the Council on Foreign Relations.

=== Public appearances and commentary ===
In October 2010, Rice met with President Obama for a discussion on national security issues. In November, Rice participated in the groundbreaking of the George W. Bush Presidential Center. Two years later, Rice introduced world leaders such as Tony Blair and Jose Maria Aznar at the center's dedication ceremony.

In May 2011, after the killing of Osama bin Laden, Rice told Zain Verjee that bin Laden's death was "gratifying because for our country this brings an important chapter to a close and it shows that the United States can, with patience and persistence, do something like this." She argued against removing troops from Afghanistan until the US finished helping the country "get more decent governance". That year, she appeared as herself on the NBC sitcom 30 Rock in the fifth-season episode "Everything Sunny All the Time Always", in which she engages in a classical-music duel with Jack Donaghy (Alec Baldwin). Within the world of the show, Donaghy had had a relationship with Rice during the show's first season.

In May 2012, Rice served as the keynote speaker at the Southern Methodist University commencement ceremony. Rice delivered a speech at the 2012 Republican National Convention. Daniel W. Drezner of Foreign Affairs praised Rice's address as the best speech of the convention.

In 2013, Rice charged Iran with having "done everything to make certain that you can't trust them", citing Iran's decades-long hiding of its nuclear program and giving the International Atomic Energy Agency "the runaround." In 2015, Rice initially declined taking a public position on the Joint Comprehensive Plan of Action "because I know how hard it is to be in there as opposed to out here", but added, "This particular deal I think has some good elements but the price that was paid was pretty high. It's entirely possible that they are already at threshold status and we will never know it." As the Trump administration weighed pulling out of the agreement, Rice said she would have "stayed in for alliance management reasons more than anything else" and charged the verification methods of the deal as not being "very strong."

In August 2015, High Point University announced that Rice would speak at the 2016 commencement ceremony. Her commencement address was highlighted by The Huffington Post, Fortune, Business Insider, NBC News, Time, and USA Today.

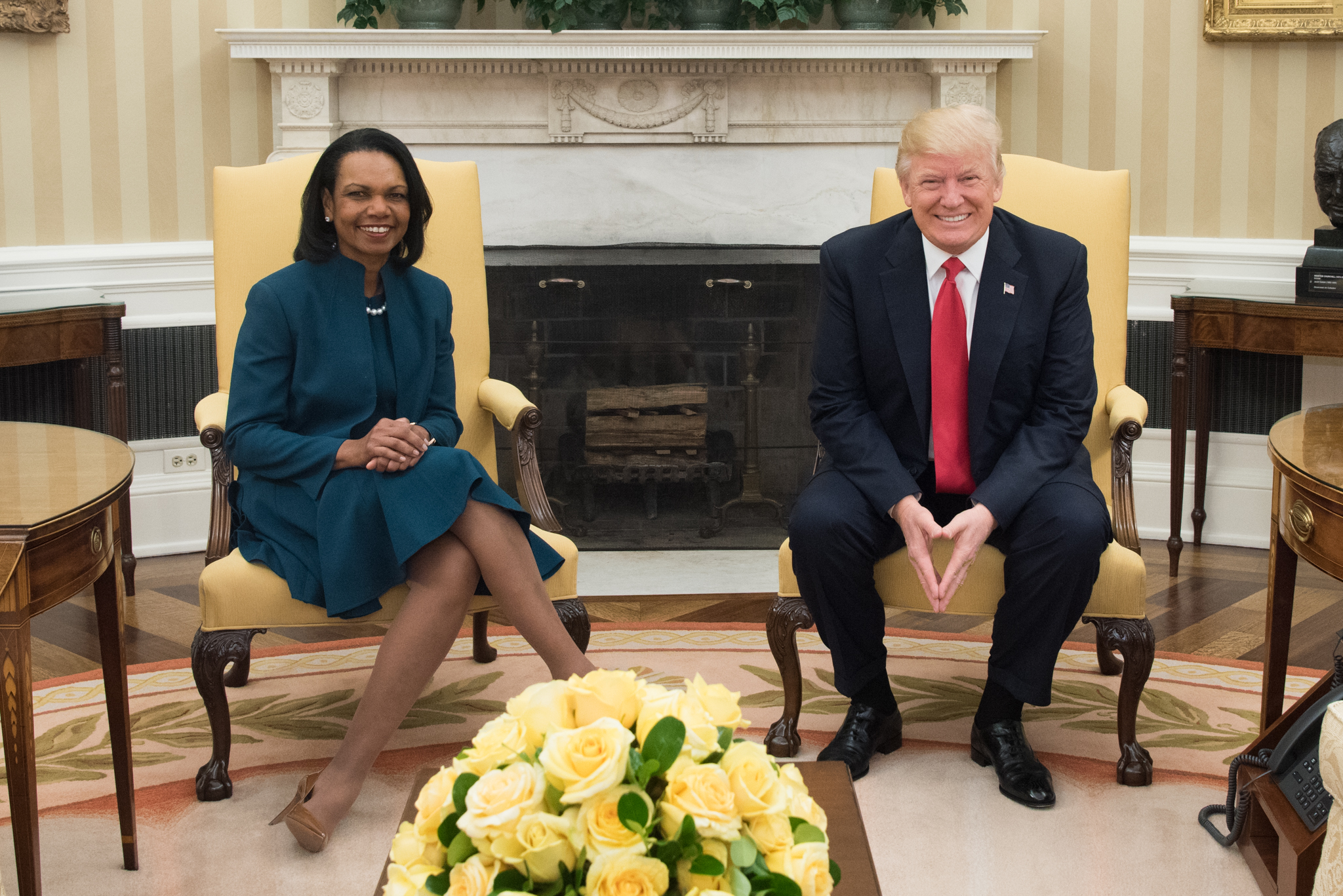
Rice with President Donald Trump, March 31, 2017

On January 26, 2017, Rice participated in a talk with the University of San Francisco, where she opined that the United States had entered "uncharted territory" with President Donald Trump due to his lack of government experience and that the new president should be given time to realize the limitations of his powers. On March 31, Rice met with Vice President Mike Pence and President Trump at the White House. In May, Rice said that alleged Russian hacking of DNC emails should "absolutely not" delegitimize Trump's presidency.

Rice supported the Trump administration "painting a very bleak picture for the Chinese", opining that the cabinet saw the region as the only country with leverage over North Korea. In 2018, Rice called decisions by North Korean leader Kim Jong Un to make overtures to the South Koreans "clever" and expressed that he was more isolated and reckless than his father. Ahead of the Singapore Summit, Rice stated her support for negotiations with North Korea, but warned the US should "go step by step, make sure there's good verification of everything the North Koreans are doing, and keep your eye on the prize of denuclearization. Because what we want to do is stop them short of threatening the American homeland."

By September 2019, Rice had publicly stated her dislike for Trump's rhetoric, especially on immigration, and warned that Trump needed "to be a lot more careful in the way that he speaks about these things because race is a very delicate and raw nerve in America." In November, as House Democrats moved forward with their impeachment inquiry into President Trump for his correspondence with Ukraine, Rice commented that she did not "like for the President of the United States to mention an American citizen for investigation to a foreign leader" and that she was troubled by "a state of conflict between the foreign policy professionals and someone in Rudy Giuliani who says he was acting on behalf of the President."

In August 2021, Rice wrote an op-ed arguing that the United States withdrew from Afghanistan too quickly and called claims that Afghans were to blame for the Taliban takeover a "corrosive and deeply unfair narrative". In October, Rice appeared as a guest cohost on The View, where she asserted that Americans were more interested in household issues than continuing to investigate the January 6 United States Capitol attack. In December, Rice joined Governor of Alabama Kay Ivey in Birmingham to announce the recommendations of the Alabama Innovation Commission, which had worked with the Hoover Institution, on means of advancing statewide technology and entrepreneurship.

In April 2022, Rice attended Madeleine Albright's funeral, where she delivered a reading from the Bible. In July, Rice participated in an Aspen Security Forum with fellow former National Security Advisors Thomas E. Donilon and Stephen Hadley. In October, Rice met with Secretary of State Antony Blinken at the Hoover Institution Hauck Auditorium and asked the incumbent about issues such as protests in Iran and the Russian invasion of Ukraine.

In 2023, after former President Trump and Governor of Florida Ron DeSantis criticized US support for Ukraine, Rice stressed the need for any potential presidential candidates to understand the essence of the conflict, which she defined as "defending a rules-based system that says might doesn't make right, you can't just extinguish your neighbor."

=== Author ===
In February 2009, it was announced that Rice had signed a three-book deal with Crown Publishers worth at least $2.5 million. Crown reported that Rice would "combine candid narrative and acute analysis to tell the story of her time in the White House and as America's top diplomat, and her role in protecting American security and shaping foreign policy during the extraordinary period from 2001-2009." In 2010, Rice released Extraordinary, Ordinary People: A Memoir of Family, an account of her upbringing. John McWhorter of The New York Times summarized, "If there is a lesson from Rice's book, it is that the civil rights revolution made it possible for an extremely talented black person (a woman, no less) to embrace a race-neutral subject and ride it into service as secretary of state, all the while thinking of herself largely as just a person." In 2011, Rice wrote No Higher Honor: A Memoir of My Years in Washington, a memoir of her time in the Bush administration. In an interview with George Stephanopoulos, Rice explained that she chose the title "because there really is no higher honor than serving your country" and named the Bush administration's attempts to consider "a different kind of Middle East" the hardest challenge they faced. Susan Chira wrote that the book "shows us two Condoleezza Rices: one, the impatient unilateralist who was national security adviser, the other the born-again diplomat who, as secretary of state, worked to repair some of the damage that had been done to American credibility by its unilateralism."

It was announced in 2013 that Rice was writing a book to be published in 2015 by Henry Holt & Company.

In 2017, Rice released Democracy: Stories from the Long Road to Freedom, a book in which she makes the case for democracy over totalitarianism or authoritarianism. In an interview, Rice said she began writing the book three years before its release and pondered that her desire to write about democracy stemmed from her youth in Birmingham "when black citizens did not experience full democracy" under segregation.

=== College Football Playoff Selection Committee ===
In October 2013, Rice was selected to be one of the thirteen inaugural members of the College Football Playoff selection committee. Her appointment caused a minor controversy in the sport. In October 2014, she revealed that she watched "14 or 15 games every week live on TV on Saturdays and recorded games on Sundays." Her term on the committee expired at the conclusion of the 2016 college football season.

=== Cleveland Browns head coach rumors ===
On November 18, 2018, ESPN's Adam Schefter reported that a league source had told him that Rice was being considered as a candidate in the Cleveland Browns' head coach search. This report sparked jokes at the expense of the Browns and outcry due to both Rice's lack of any experience in coaching and Rice being a woman. Shortly after the initial report, the Browns and General Manager John Dorsey denied the report saying, "Our coaching search will be thorough and deliberate, but we are still in the process of composing the list of candidates and Secretary Rice has not been discussed." Rice, who is a lifelong Browns fan, also denied the reports but joked that she "would like to call a play or two next season if the Browns need ideas."

=== Speculation on political future ===
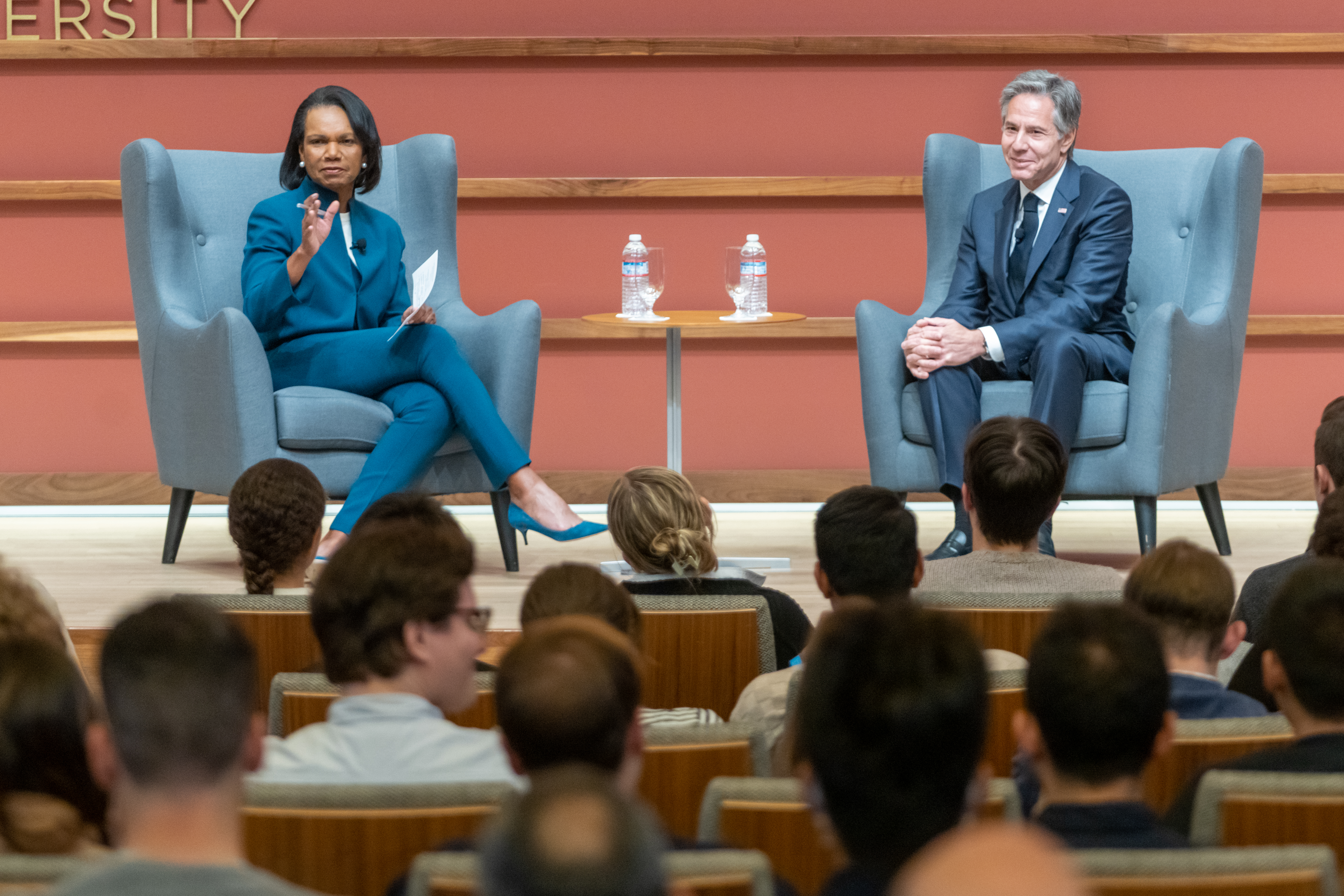
Rice speaks with Secretary of State Antony Blinken at Stanford University in 2022.

As early as 2003, there were reports that Rice was considering a run for governor of California, while ruling out running for the Senate in 2004. There was also speculation that Rice would run for the Republican nomination in the 2008 primaries, which she ruled out on Meet the Press. On February 22, 2008, Rice played down any suggestion that she may be on the Republican vice presidential ticket: "I have always said that the one thing that I have not seen myself doing is running for elected office in the United States."

==== For Presidency ====
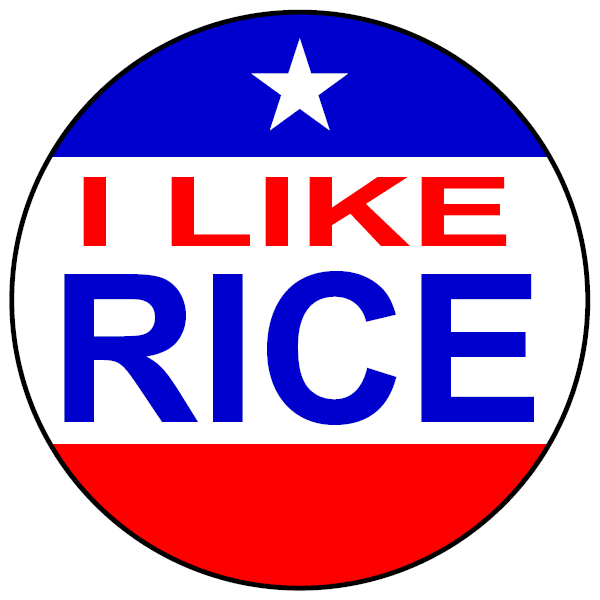
A variation of a campaign button put out by Americans For Rice, similar to the famous "I like Ike" button

The "Draft Condi" movement (or "Draft Rice" movement) was a grassroots effort to draft Rice to run for President of the United States in the 2008 U.S. election. At that time, Rice had become one of the most powerful female and African American political figures in U.S. history. In August 2004 and again in August 2005 Forbes magazine named Rice the world's most powerful woman. And in August 2006, Forbes named Rice the second most powerful woman in the world, behind Angela Merkel, the German chancellor.

As Secretary of State, Rice was fourth in line to succeed George W. Bush as president. That is higher in the U.S. presidential line of succession than any woman before Nancy Pelosi became the Speaker of the House. (Former Secretary of State Madeleine Albright was not a natural-born U.S. citizen and was therefore ineligible to become president.) On April 8, 2008, Rice denied any interest in serving as running mate for John McCain, stating that she intended instead to return to Stanford University. Her supporters have touted a future vice presidential or presidential candidacy, and later as a candidate for the 2018 California Gubernatorial election.

Rice repeatedly said that she had no desire or interest in becoming president. Interviewed by Tim Russert on March 14, 2005, Rice declared, "I will not run for president of the United States. How is that? I don't know how many ways to say 'no' in this town."

During an interview with Russian Echo Moscow Radio, Rice was asked about her intentions concerning running for president. When asked by a schoolgirl, "One day you will run for president?" she replied, "President, да, да [yes, yes]," before she quickly answered with "нет, нет, нет [no, no, no]."

However, in May 2005, several of Rice's associates claimed that she would be willing to run for the presidency if she were drafted into the race. On October 16, 2005, on NBC's Meet the Press, Rice again denied she would run for president in 2008. While she said she was flattered that many people wanted her to run, she said it was not what she wanted to do with her life. Rice told Fox News Sunday host, Chris Wallace: "I'm quite certain that there are going to be really fine candidates for president from our party, and I'm looking forward to seeing them and perhaps supporting them." Interviewed on BBC television's The Politics Show on October 23, she again stated her decision not to run.

Certain high-profile political figures, including Laura Bush, former White House Spokesman Scott McClellan, and world leaders such as Russian President Vladimir Putin and former Australian Prime Minister John Howard have also voiced encouragement. Laura Bush has perhaps been the strongest proponent of Rice's candidacy. On CNN's The Situation Room on January 17, 2006, Mrs. Bush implicated Rice when asked if she thought the United States would soon have a female president, stating: "I'd love to see her run. She's terrific." Mrs. Bush then turned to advocacy during an interview on CNN's Larry King Live on March 24, 2006, in which she stated that Rice would make an "excellent president," and that she wished Americans could "talk her into running." However, Mrs. Bush has also stated that Rice will not run for president "[p]robably because she is single, her parents are no longer living, she's an only child. You need a very supportive family and supportive friends to have this job."

Rice was frequently mentioned as a possible opponent of Hillary Clinton in the 2008 election, a scenario that was the subject of the book Condi vs. Hillary: The Next Great Presidential Race, by political strategist Dick Morris and his wife, Eileen McGann-Morris, published in October 2005. In 2006, Rice was mentioned by 5% of likely Republican voters asked "[I]n 2008, who would you most like to see elected president?" This was third highest among Republican voters behind eventual nominee John McCain with 9% and George W. Bush with 7%. However, she also said in an interview that she was not interested in running.

Rice had publicly expressed aspirations to become the next commissioner of the National Football League and following the announcement of Paul Tagliabue's retirement, she was widely believed to be a serious contender for the post. If appointed to the office, she would have been both the first African American and the first female commissioner of any North American major sports league. However, Rice, a Cleveland Browns fan, said she was not interested in replacing Tagliabue, saying that she preferred to remain as Secretary of State.

==== For Vice presidency ====
During an interview with the editorial board of The Washington Times on March 27, 2008, Rice said she was "not interested" in running for vice president. In a Gallup poll from March 24 to 27, 2008, Rice was mentioned by eight percent of Republican respondents to be their first choice to be John McCain's Republican vice presidential running mate, slightly behind Mike Huckabee and Mitt Romney.

Republican strategist Dan Senor said on ABC's This Week on April 6, 2008, that "Condi Rice has been actively, actually in recent weeks, campaigning for" the vice presidential nomination. He based this assessment on her attendance of Grover Norquist's Americans for Tax Reform conservative leader's meeting on March 26, 2008. In response to Senor's comments, Rice's spokesperson denied that Rice was seeking the vice presidential nomination, saying, "If she is actively seeking the vice presidency, then she's the last one to know about it."

In August 2008, the speculation about a potential McCain–Rice ticket finally ended when then-Governor Sarah Palin of Alaska was selected as McCain's running-mate.

In early December 2008, Rice praised President-elect Barack Obama's selection of New York senator Hillary Clinton to succeed her as Secretary of State, saying "she's terrific". Rice, who spoke to Clinton after her selection, said Clinton "is someone of intelligence and she'll do a great job".

Rumors arose once again during the 2012 presidential race that presumptive nominee Mitt Romney was looking into vetting Rice for the vice presidency. Rice once again denied any such intentions or desires to become the vice president, reiterating in numerous interviews that she "is a policy maker, not a politician." Speculation ended in August 2012 when Romney announced that Representative Paul Ryan was chosen as his running-mate. Rice campaigned for the Romney-Ryan ticket in the general election.

According to Bob Woodward's 2018 book Fear: Trump in the White House, then-Republican National Committee chairman Reince Priebus told then Republican nominee Donald Trump, that he should drop out of the race for the good of the party following the release of the Access Hollywood tapes. During these discussions, it was revealed that Mike Pence, the vice presidential nominee, had agreed to replace Trump on the top of the ticket as the Republican presidential nominee, with Rice agreeing to be Pence's running mate.

While promoting his book Out of Many, One: Portraits of America's Immigrants, former President Bush revealed he wrote-in Rice in the 2020 election and said that although Rice was aware of the vote, she told him she "would refuse to accept the office."

== Political positions ==
Condoleezza Rice is often described as a centrist or moderate Republican. On The Issues, a non-partisan organization which rates candidates based on their policy positions, considers Rice to be a centrist. She takes both liberal and conservative positions; she is pro-choice on abortion, supports gun rights, opposes same-sex marriage but supports civil unions, and supports building oil pipelines such as the Keystone XL pipeline.

=== Terrorist activity ===
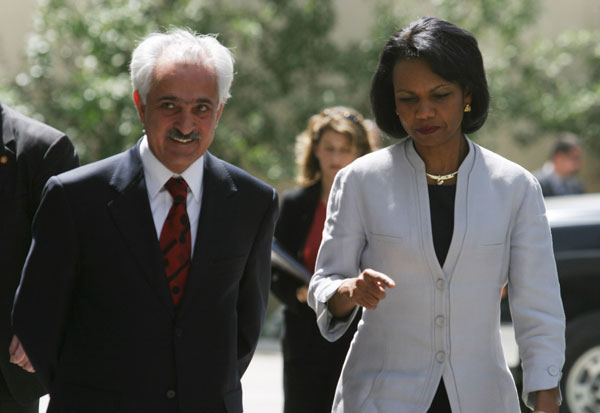
Rice meets with Afghan foreign minister Rangin Dadfar Spanta to discuss anti-terrorism efforts, 2006

Rice's policy as Secretary of State viewed counter-terrorism as a matter of being preventative, and not merely punitive. In an interview on December 18, 2005, Rice stated: "We have to remember that in this war on terrorism, we're not talking about criminal activity where you can allow somebody to commit the crime and then you go back and you arrest them and you question them. If they succeed in committing their crime, then hundreds or indeed thousands of people die. That's why you have to prevent, and intelligence is the long pole in the tent in preventing attacks."

Rice has promoted the idea that counterterrorism involves not only confronting the governments and organizations that promote and condone terrorism, but also the ideologies that fuel terrorism. In a speech given on July 29, 2005, Rice asserted that "[s]ecuring America from terrorist attack is more than a matter of law enforcement. We must also confront the ideology of hatred in foreign societies by supporting the universal hope of liberty and the inherent appeal of democracy."

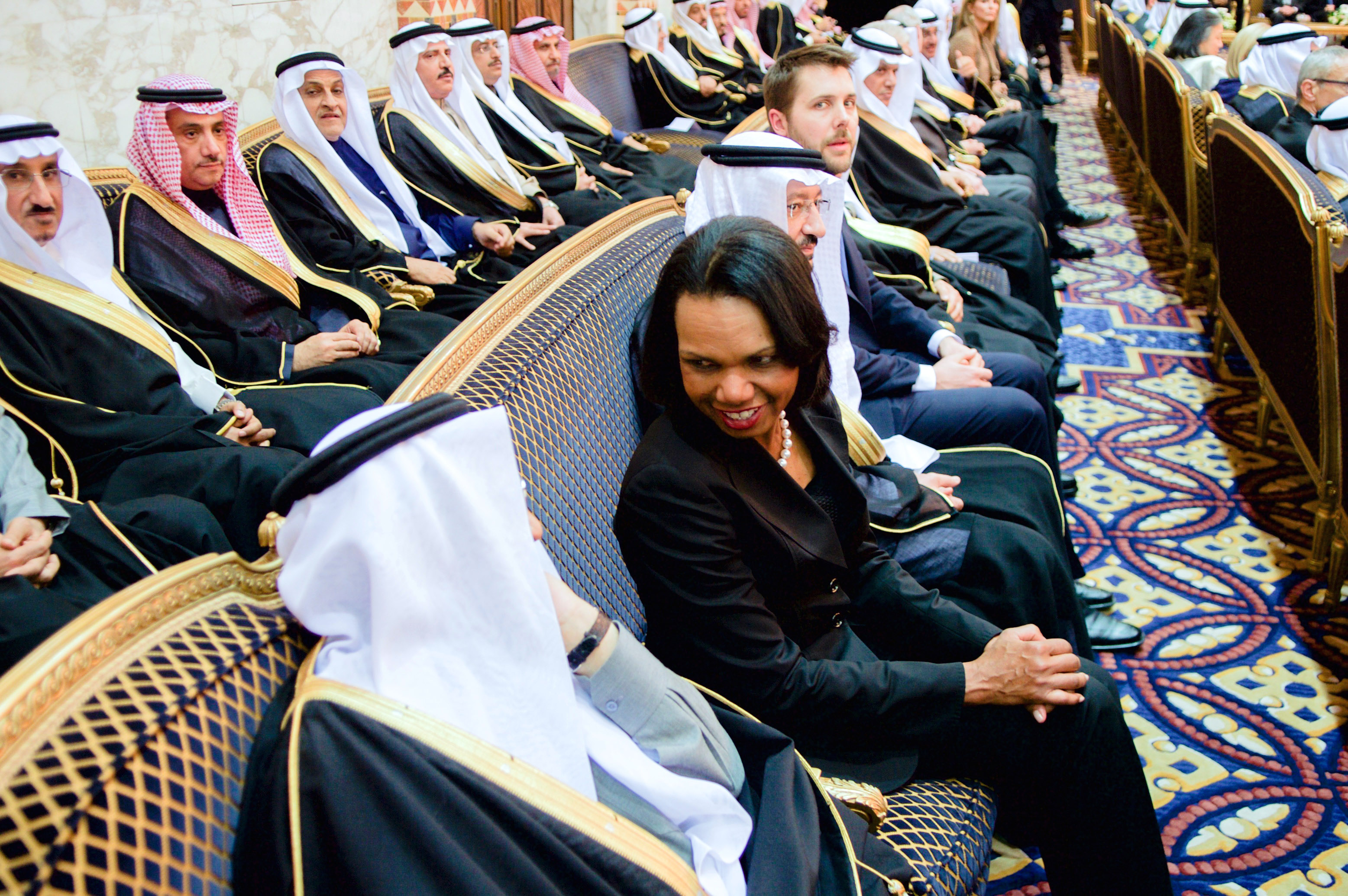
Rice chats with a member of the Saudi Royal Family after welcoming the new king Salman of Saudi Arabia, January 27, 2015

In January 2005, during Bush's second inaugural ceremonies, Rice first used the term "outposts of tyranny" to refer to countries Rice thought to threaten world peace and human rights. This term has been called a descendant of Bush's phrase, "Axis of Evil", used to describe Iraq, Iran and North Korea. She identified six such "outposts" in which she said the United States has a duty to foster freedom: Cuba, Zimbabwe, Burma and Belarus, as well as Iran and North Korea.

=== Abortion ===
Rice said "If you go back to 2000 when I helped the president in the campaign. I said that I was, in effect, kind of libertarian on this issue. And meaning by that, that I have been concerned about a government role in this issue. I am a strong proponent of parental choice—of parental notification. I am a strong proponent of a ban on late-term abortion. These are all things that I think unite people and I think that that's where we should be. I've called myself at times mildly pro-choice." She would not want the federal government "forcing its views on one side or the other." She did not want the Supreme Court decision legalizing abortion, Roe v. Wade, to be overturned.

Rice said she believes President Bush "has been in exactly the right place" on abortion, "which is we have to respect the culture of life and we have to try and bring people to have respect for it and make this as rare a circumstance as possible". However, she added that she has been "concerned about a government role" but has "tended to agree with those who do not favor federal funding for abortion, because I believe that those who hold a strong moral view on the other side should not be forced to fund" the procedure.

=== Affirmative action ===
Rice has taken a centrist approach to "race and gender preferences" in affirmative action policies. She described affirmative action as being "still needed," but she does not support quotas.

=== Female empowerment advocacy ===
In March 2014, Rice joined and appeared in video spots for the Ban Bossy campaign, a television and social media campaign designed to ban the word "bossy" from general use because of its harmful effect on young girls. Several video spots with other notable spokespersons including Beyoncé, Jennifer Garner and others were produced along with a web site providing school training material, leadership tips, and an online pledge form to which visitors can promise not to use the word.

=== Immigration ===
Condoleezza Rice supported the comprehensive immigration plan backed by the Bush administration and shared that it was among her regrets that it did not pass through Congress. In 2014, Rice criticized the Obama administration from seeking to approve immigration reforms through executive action. In February 2017 Rice publicly announced her opposition to the Trump administration's travel ban.

=== Gun rights ===
Rice says that she became a "Second Amendment absolutist" due to her experience of growing up in Birmingham and facing threats from the KKK. "Rice's fondness for the Second Amendment began while watching her father sit on the porch with a gun, ready to defend his family against the Klan's night riders."

=== Same-sex marriage and LGBT issues ===
While Rice does not support same-sex marriage, she does support civil unions. In 2010, Rice stated that she believed "marriage is between a man and a woman ... But perhaps we will decide that there needs to be some way for people to express their desire to live together through civil union." When asked to select a view on a survey, Rice selected a response that said "Same-sex couples should be allowed to form civil unions, but not marry in the traditional sense."

=== Confederate monuments ===
In May 2017, Rice said she opposes the removal of Confederate monuments and memorials or the renaming of buildings named after Confederate generals. She argued, "If you forget your history, you're likely to repeat it. ... When you start wiping out your history, sanitizing your history to make you feel better, it's a bad thing."

== Racial discrimination ==
Rice experienced firsthand the injustices of Birmingham's discriminatory laws and attitudes. She was instructed by her parents to walk proudly in public and to use the facilities at home rather than face shame from the "colored" facilities in town. She later said, "they refused to allow the limits and injustices of their time to limit our horizons."

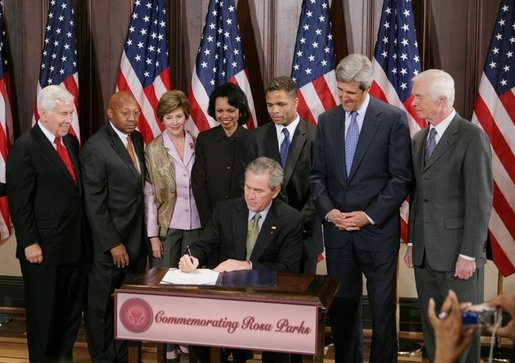
President Bush signing the bill for a Rosa Parks statue at Statuary Hall, Washington, D.C.

However, Rice recalls various times in which she suffered discrimination on account of her race, which included being relegated to a storage room at a department store instead of a regular dressing room, being barred from going to the circus or the local amusement park, being denied hotel rooms, and even being given bad food at restaurants. Also, while Rice was mostly kept by her parents from areas where she might face discrimination, she was very aware of the civil rights struggle and the problems of Jim Crow laws in Birmingham. A neighbor, Juliemma Smith, described how "[Condi] used to call me and say things like, 'Did you see what Bull Connor did today?' She was just a little girl and she did that all the time. I would have to read the newspaper thoroughly because I wouldn't know what she was going to talk about." Rice herself said of the segregation era: "Those terrible events burned into my consciousness. I missed many days at my segregated school because of the frequent bomb threats."

During the violent days of the Civil Rights Movement, Reverend Rice armed himself and kept guard over the house while Condoleezza practiced the piano inside. Reverend Rice instilled in his daughter and students that black people would have to prove themselves worthy of advancement, and would simply have to be "twice as good" to overcome injustices built into the system.

Rice said "My parents were very strategic, I was going to be so well prepared, and I was going to do all of these things that were revered in white society so well, that I would be armored somehow from racism. I would be able to confront white society on its own terms." While the Rices supported the goals of the civil rights movement, they did not agree with the idea of putting their child in harm's way.

Rice was eight when her schoolmate Denise McNair, aged 11, was murdered in the bombing of the primarily black Sixteenth Street Baptist Church by white supremacists on September 15, 1963. Rice has commented upon that moment in her life:

I remember the bombing of that Sunday School at 16th Street Baptist Church in Birmingham in 1963. I did not see it happen, but I heard it happen, and I felt it happen, just a few blocks away at my father's church. It is a sound that I will never forget, that will forever reverberate in my ears. That bomb took the lives of four young girls, including my friend and playmate, Denise McNair. The crime was calculated to suck the hope out of young lives, bury their aspirations. But those fears were not propelled forward, those terrorists failed.

== Legacy ==
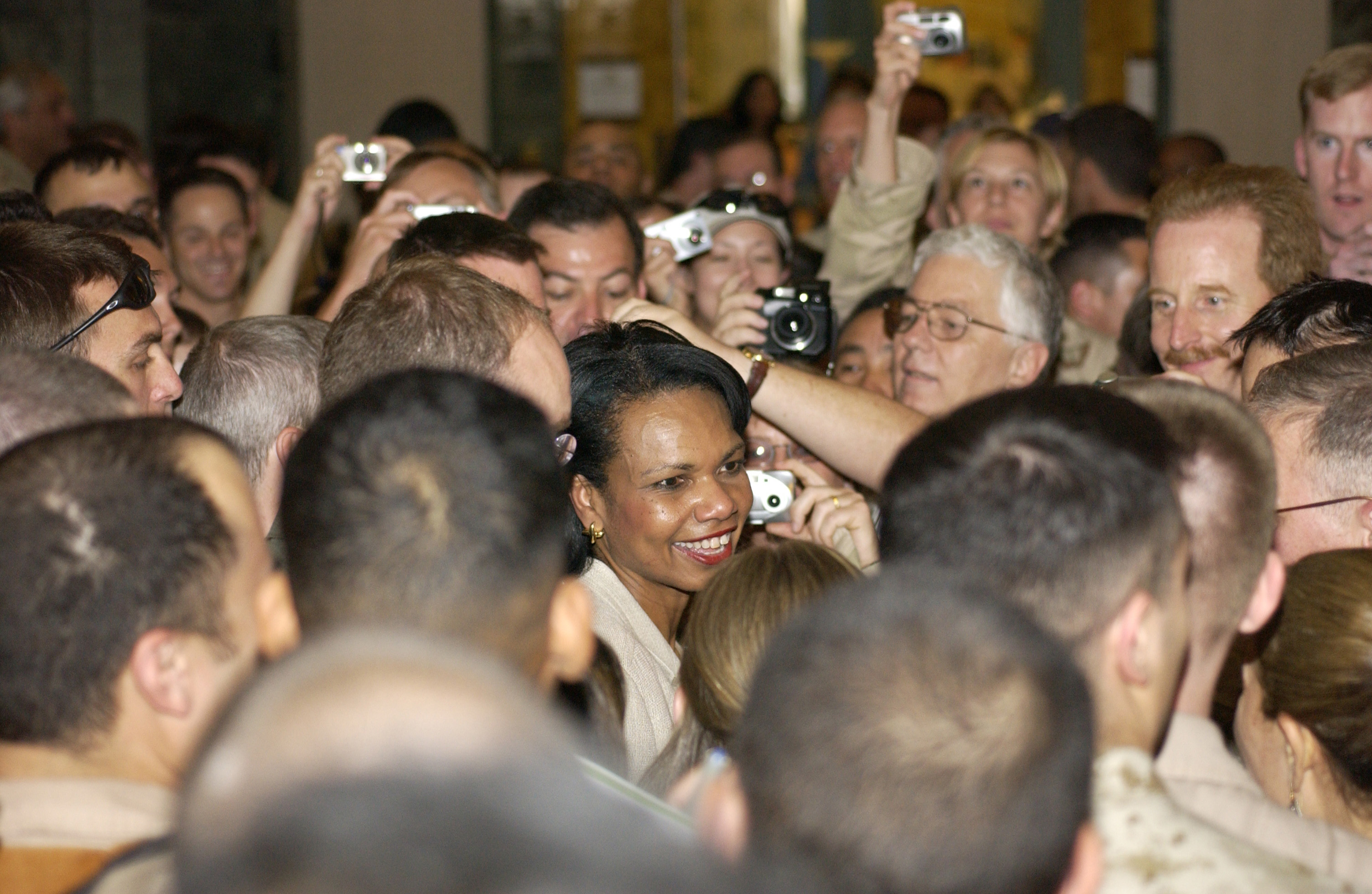
Rice greets U.S. military personnel at the American Embassy in Baghdad, Iraq, on May 15, 2005.

Rice has appeared four times on the Time 100, Time magazine's list of the world's 100 most influential people. Rice is one of only nine people in the world whose influence has been considered enduring enough to have made the list—first compiled in 1999 as a retrospective of the 20th century and made an annual feature in 2004—so frequently. However, the list contains people who have the influence to change for better or for worse, and Time has also accused her of squandering her influence, stating on February 1, 2007, that her "accomplishments as Secretary of State have been modest, and even those have begun to fade" and that she "has been slow to recognize the extent to which the U.S.'s prestige has declined." In its March 19, 2007, issue it followed up stating that Rice was "executing an unmistakable course correction in U.S. foreign policy."

In 2004 and 2005, she was ranked as the most powerful woman in the world by Forbes magazine and number two in 2006 (following the chancellor of Germany, Angela Merkel).

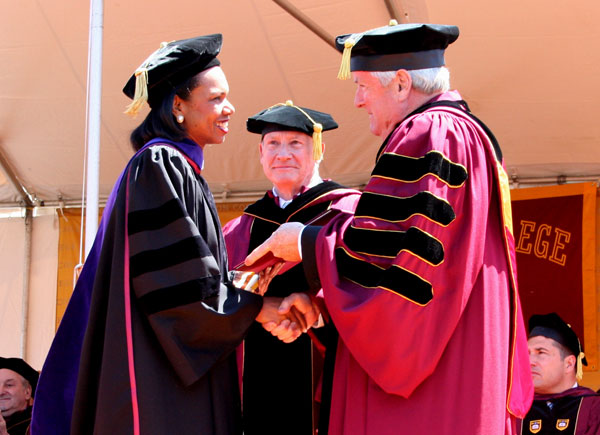
Rice makes an appearance at Boston College, where she is greeted by Father William Leahy.

=== Criticism from Senator Barbara Boxer ===
California Democratic senator Barbara Boxer has also criticized Rice in relation to the war in Iraq. During Rice's confirmation hearing for U.S. secretary of state in January 2005, Boxer stated, "I personally believe—this is my personal view—that your loyalty to the mission you were given, to sell the war, overwhelmed your respect for the truth."

On January 11, 2007, Boxer, during a debate over the war in Iraq, said, "Now, the issue is who pays the price, who pays the price? I'm not going to pay a personal price. My kids are too old, and my grandchild is too young. You're not going to pay a particular price, as I understand it, within immediate family. So who pays the price? The American military and their families, and I just want to bring us back to that fact."

The New York Post and White House press secretary Tony Snow called Boxer's statement an attack on Rice's status as a single, childless female and referred to Boxer's comments as "a great leap backward for feminism." Rice later echoed Snow's remarks, saying "I thought it was okay to not have children, and I thought you could still make good decisions on behalf of the country if you were single and didn't have children." Boxer responded to the controversy by saying "They're getting this off on a non-existent thing that I didn't say. I'm saying, she's like me, we do not have families who are in the military."

=== Conservative criticism ===
According to The Washington Post in late July 2008, former undersecretary of state and U.N. ambassador John R. Bolton was referring to Rice and her allies in the Bush Administration whom he believes abandoned earlier hard-line principles when he said: "Once the collapse begins, adversaries have a real opportunity to gain advantage. In terms of the Bush presidency, this many reversals this close to the end destroys credibility ... It appears there is no depth to which this administration will not sink in its last days."

Former secretary of defense Donald Rumsfeld repeatedly criticized Rice after their terms in office ended. In his book Known and Unknown: A Memoir, he portrayed her as a young, inexperienced academic who did not know her place. In 2011, she responded, saying that Rumsfeld "doesn't know what he's talking about." She further addresses the issue in her own book, saying "He would become frustrated when my staff would reach out to military officers in the Pentagon to coordinate the particulars of a policy among the agencies. This was a routine responsibility for the NSC, but for some reason Don interpreted such actions as a violation of his authority."

In his book In My Time, Dick Cheney suggested that Rice had misled the president about nuclear diplomacy with North Korea, saying that she was naïve. He called her advice on the issue "utterly misleading." He also chided Rice for clashing with White House advisers on the tone of the president's speeches on Iraq and said that she, as the secretary of state, ruefully conceded to him that the Bush administration should not have apologized for a claim the president made in his 2003 State of the Union address, on Saddam's supposed search for yellowcake uranium. She "came into my office, sat down in the chair next to my desk, and tearfully admitted I had been right," Cheney wrote. Rice responded: "It certainly doesn't sound like me, now, does it?", saying that she viewed the book as an "attack on my integrity."

Rice has also been criticized by other conservatives. Stephen Hayes of the Weekly Standard accused her of jettisoning the Bush Doctrine, including the Iraq War troop surge of 2007. Other conservatives criticized her for her approach to Russia policy and other issues.

=== Views within the Black American community ===
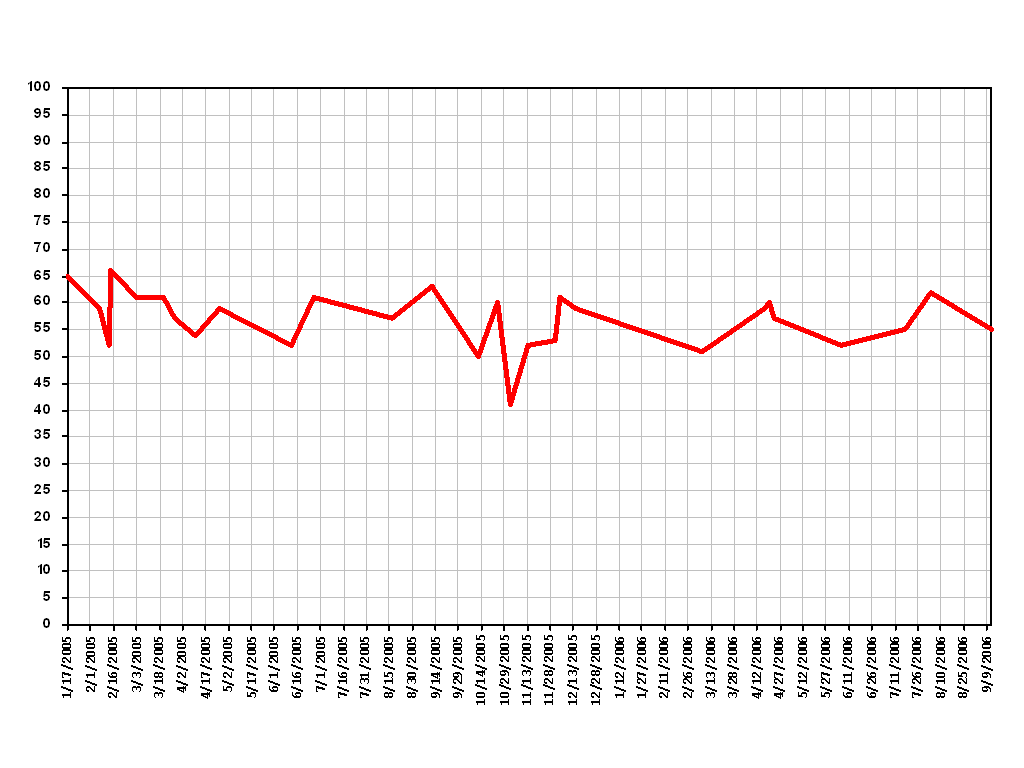
Rice's approval ratings from January 2005 to September 2006

Rice's ratings decreased following a heated battle for her confirmation as Secretary of State and following Hurricane Katrina in August 2005. Rice's rise within the George W. Bush administration initially drew a largely positive response from many in the black community. In a 2002 survey, then National Security Advisor Rice was viewed favorably by 41% of black respondents, but another 40% did not know Rice well enough to rate her and her profile remained comparatively obscure. As her role increased, some black commentators began to express doubts concerning Rice's stances and statements on various issues. In 2005, The Washington Post columnist Eugene Robinson asked, "How did [Rice] come to a worldview so radically different from that of most black Americans?"

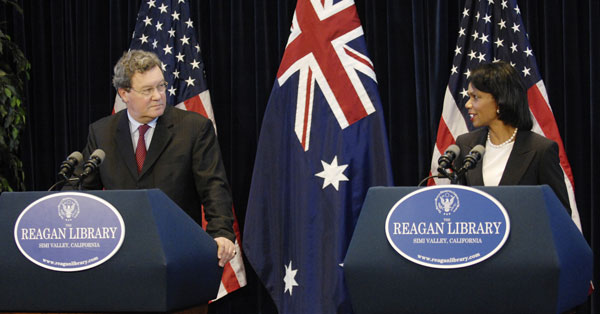
Rice and Australian Foreign Minister Alexander Downer participate in a news conference at the Ronald Reagan Presidential Library in Simi Valley, California, in 2007.

In August 2005, American musician, actor, and social activist Harry Belafonte, who served on the Board of TransAfrica, referred to blacks in the Bush administration as "black tyrants." Belafonte's comments received mixed reactions.

Rice dismissed these criticisms during a September 14, 2005 interview when she said, "Why would I worry about something like that? ... The fact of the matter is I've been black all my life. Nobody needs to tell me how to be black."

Black commentators have defended Rice, including Mike Espy, Andrew Young, C. Delores Tucker (chair of the National Congress of Black Women), Clarence Page, Colbert King, Dorothy Height (chair and president emerita of the National Council of Negro Women) and Kweisi Mfume (Congressman and former CEO of the NAACP).

== Personal life ==
Rice has never married and has no children. In the 1970s, she dated and was briefly engaged to professional American football player Rick Upchurch but left him because, according to biographer Marcus Mabry, she "knew the relationship wasn't going to work."

Rice's mother, Angelena Rice, died of breast cancer in 1985, aged 61, when Rice was 30. In 1989, Rice's father, John Wesley Rice, wed Clara Bailey, to whom he remained married until his death in 2000, aged 77.

From 2003 to 2017, Rice co-owned a house in Palo Alto, California with a woman, Randy Bean. According to public records, the two initially bought the house with a third investor, Stanford University professor Coit D. Blacker, who later sold his line of credit to the two women. The property arrangement was first revealed in Glenn Kessler's book The Confidante: Condoleezza Rice and the Creation of the Bush Legacy (2007), sparking rumors about the nature of Rice and Bean's relationship. Kessler has stated he "did not know if this meant there was something more to the relationship between the women beyond a friendship."

On August 20, 2012, Rice was one of the first two women to be admitted as members to Augusta National Golf Club; the other was South Carolina financier Darla Moore. In 2014, Rice was named to the ESPNW Impact 25. Rice has described her faith as Presbyterian, being a noted member of Menlo Park Presbyterian Church. She has also been a member at Westminster Presbyterian Church USA in Alabama.

=== Music ===
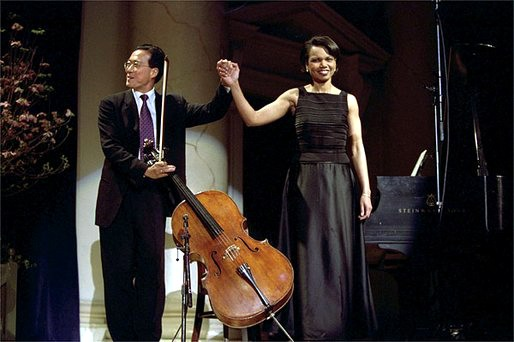
Yo-Yo Ma and Rice after performing together at the 2001 National Medal of Arts and National Humanities Medal Awards, April 22, 2002

At the age of 15, Rice played a Mozart Piano Concerto with the Denver Symphony Orchestra, her prize for winning a student music competition. Until college, she planned to become a professional pianist and still plays with an amateur chamber music group in Washington. She accompanied cellist Yo-Yo Ma in playing Johannes Brahms' Violin Sonata in D minor at Constitution Hall in April 2002 for the National Medal of Arts Awards.

She has performed at diplomatic events at embassies, including a performance for Queen Elizabeth II, and she has performed in public with cellist Yo-Yo Ma and singer Aretha Franklin. In 2005, Rice accompanied Charity Sunshine Tillemann-Dick, a 21-year-old soprano, for a benefit concert for the Pulmonary Hypertension Association at the Kennedy Center in Washington. She performed briefly during her cameo appearance in the "Everything Sunny All the Time Always" episode of 30 Rock. She has stated that her favorite composer is Johannes Brahms, because she thinks Brahms's music is "passionate but not sentimental." On a complementary note, Rice has revealed on multiple occasions that she enjoys the band Led Zeppelin, and in a 2009 appearance on The Tonight Show with Jay Leno, she stated that it was her favorite band.

As Secretary of State, Rice was ex officio a member of the Board of Trustees of the John F. Kennedy Center for the Performing Arts. As the end of their tenures approached in January 2009, outgoing President Bush appointed her to a six-year term on the board of trustees.

== Honorary degrees ==
Rice has received several honorary degrees from various American universities, including:

Honorary degrees

State	Year	School	Degree
(Georgia (U.S. state)) Georgia	1991	Morehouse College	Doctor of Laws (LL.D)
Alabama	1994	University of Alabama	Doctor of Humane Letters (DHL)
Indiana	1995	University of Notre Dame	Doctor of Laws (LL.D)
District of Columbia	2002	National Defense University	Doctor of National Security Affairs
Mississippi	2003	Mississippi College School of Law	Doctor of Laws (LL.D)
Kentucky	2004	University of Louisville	Doctor of Public Service (DPS)
Michigan	2004	Michigan State University	Doctor of Humane Letters (DHL)
Massachusetts	2006	Boston College	Doctor of Laws (LL.D)
Alabama	2008	Air University	Doctor of Letters (D.Litt.)
North Carolina	2010	Johnson C. Smith University	Doctor of Laws (LL.D)
Texas	2012	Southern Methodist University	Doctor of Laws (LL.D)
Virginia	2015	College of William and Mary	Doctor of Public Service (DPS)
Tennessee	2018	Sewanee: The University of the South	Doctor of Civil Law (DCL)
New York	2021	Siena College	Doctor of Humane Letters (DHL)

== Honors ==
National

- Ellis Island Medal of Honor

Foreign

- Knight's Cross of the Order of Polonia Restituta (Poland, 1998)
- Grand Officer of the Order of the Star of Romania (Romania, 2003)
- Member 1st Class of the Order of the Balkan Mountains (Bulgaria, 2007)
- Grand Cross with Gold Badge of the Order of San Carlos (Colombia, 2009)
- Grand Cordon of the Order of the Rising Sun (Japan, 2017)

== Published works ==
- Rice, Condoleezza (1984). The Soviet Union and the Czechoslovak Army: Uncertain Allegiance. Princeton University Press. ISBN 0-691-06921-2
- Rice, Condoleezza & Dallin, Alexander (eds.) (1986). The Gorbachev Era. Stanford Alumni Association, trade paperback (1986), ISBN 0-916318-18-4; Garland Publishing, Incorporated, hardcover (1992), 376 pages, ISBN 0-8153-0571-0.
- Rice, Condoleezza with Zelikow, Philip D. (1995). Germany Unified and Europe Transformed: A Study in Statecraft. Harvard University Press. (1995), 520 pp., ISBN 0-674-35324-2, 0-674-35325-0.
- Rice, Condoleezza, "Campaign 2000: Promoting the National Interest" in Foreign Affairs, 2000.
- Rice, Condoleezza, with Kiron K. Skinner, Serhiy Kudelia, and Bruce Bueno de Mesquita (2007). The Strategy of Campaigning: Lessons from Ronald Reagan and Boris Yeltsin, paperback, 356 pp., ISBN 978-0-472-03319-5. University of Michigan Press, Ann Arbor.
- Rice, Condoleezza (2010), Extraordinary, Ordinary People: A Memoir of Family, Crown Archetype, ISBN 978-0-307-58787-9
- Rice, Condoleezza (2011), No Higher Honor: A Memoir of My Years in Washington. Crown Archetype, ISBN 978-0-307-58786-2
- Rice, Condoleezza (2017), Democracy: Stories from the Long Road to Freedom, Twelve, 496 pp., ISBN 978-1455540181.
- Rice, Condoleezza; Zegart, Amy (2018). Political Risk: How Businesses and Organizations Can Anticipate Global Insecurity. New York: Twelve. ISBN 978-1455542352. OCLC 1019846069.

== See also ==
- List of African-American United States Cabinet members
- List of female United States Cabinet members

Academic offices
Preceded by Gerald Lieberman	Provost of Stanford University; 1993–1999	Succeeded by John L. Hennessy
Political offices
Preceded by Sandy Berger	National Security Advisor; 2001–2005	Succeeded by Stephen Hadley
Preceded by Colin Powell	United States Secretary of State; 2005–2009	Succeeded by Hillary Clinton
Non-profit organization positions
Preceded by Thomas W. Gilligan	Director of the Hoover Institution; 2020–present	Incumbent
U.S. order of precedence (ceremonial)
Preceded by James Baker as Former U.S. Secretary of State	Order of precedence of the United States as Former U.S. Secretary of State	Succeeded by Hillary Clinton as Former U.S. Secretary of State
