= Democracy: Stories from the Long Road to Freedom =

2017 book by Condoleezza Rice

- Authors: Condoleezza Rice
- Language: English
- Genre: Non-fiction
- Publisher: Grand Central Publishing
- Publication date: 2017
- ISBN: 9781455540181
- OCLC: 1010913866

Democracy: Stories from the Long Road to Freedom is a 2017 book authored by former U.S. Secretary of State Condoleezza Rice. In it, Rice makes the case for democracy as opposed to totalitarianism or authoritarianism. She looks at the political histories of the United States, Russia, Poland, Ukraine, Kenya, Colombia, and the Middle East. Reviewers noted the timeliness of Rice's study, given the rise of populism in the United States and beyond.
