= Democrat Party =

Democrat Party may refer to:

- Democratic Party (United States) (founded 1828)
  - Democrat Party (epithet), a pejorative term used by opponents of the Democratic Party
- Democrat (Brazil)
- Democrat Party (Chile) (1887–1941)
- Democrat Party (Persia) (1909–1919/21)
- Democrat Party (Thailand) (founded 1946)
- Democrat Party (Turkey, 1946–61)
- Democratic Party (Indonesia) (founded 2001)
- Democrat Party (Turkey, current) (founded 2007)
- Democrat Party of Iran (1946–1948)
- The Democrats (Israel) (founded 2024)

== See also ==
- Democracy Party (disambiguation)
- Democrat (disambiguation)
- Democratic Party (disambiguation)
- Demokrat Parti (disambiguation)
