= Democracy Party =

Democracy Party may refer to:

- Democracy Party (Turkey) (Turkish: Demokrasi Partisi), a pro-Kurdish party in Turkey
- Democracy Party (Iran) (Persian: حزب مردمسالاری, Hezb-e-Mardomsalari), a pro-reforms party in Iran
- Democracy Party of China

== See also ==
- Democracy (disambiguation)
- Democratic Party (disambiguation)
- Democrat Party (disambiguation)
