= The Democrats (Austria) =

Austrian political party

The Democrats (German: Die Demokraten) were a minor Austrian political party.

The party was founded in 1991 as a split from the FPÖ by the former secretary of state Mario Ferrari-Brunnenfeld (initially as FDP Österreich). It became publicly notable under the leadership of Rudolf Fußi, who protested against the government's intent to purchase new Eurofighter jets. He initiated a referendum on this topic (Anti-Abfangjäger-Volksbegehren). The Democrats saw themselves as a democratic, liberal party, promoting equal opportunities, a market economy, environmental protection, openness and tolerance.

The Democrats participated in only one National Council election, fielding candidates in 2002 in the states of Vienna and Vorarlberg. The party received 0.05% of the vote and won no seats. The party did not stand in 2006, and Fussi defected to the social-democratic SPÖ.
