= Democrat Party (epithet) =

Epithet for the US Democratic Party

Democrat Party is an epithet and pejorative for the Democratic Party of the United States, often used in a disparaging fashion by the party's opponents. While use of the term started out as non-hostile, it has grown in its negative use since the 1940s, in particular by members of the Republican Party—in party platforms, partisan speeches, and press releases—as well as by conservative commentators and third party politicians.

== Modern usage ==
United Press International reported in August 1984 that the term Democrat Party had been employed "in recent years by some right-wing Republicans" because the party's Democratic name implied that the Democrats were "the only true adherents of democracy".

Language expert Roy Copperud said it was used by Republicans who disliked the implication that Democratic Party implied to listeners that Democrats "are somehow the anointed custodians of the concept of democracy". According to Oxford Dictionaries, the use of Democrat rather than the adjective Democratic "is in keeping with a longstanding tradition among Republicans of dropping the –ic in order to maintain a distinction from the broader, positive associations of the adjective democratic with democracy and egalitarianism".

Political commentator William Safire wrote in 1993 that the Democrat of Democrat Party "does conveniently rhyme with autocrat, plutocrat, and worst of all, bureaucrat". In 2006, Hendrik Hertzberg wrote in The New Yorker:

There's no great mystery about the motives behind this deliberate misnaming. "Democrat Party" is a slur, or intended to be—a handy way to express contempt. Aesthetic judgments are subjective, of course, but "Democrat Party" is jarring verging on ugly. It fairly screams "rat".

Republican pollster Frank Luntz tested the phrase with a focus group in 2001, and concluded that the only people who really disliked the epithet were highly partisan Democrats. Political analyst Charlie Cook attributed modern use of the term to force of habit rather than a deliberate epithet by Republicans. Journalist Ruth Marcus stated that Republicans likely only continue to employ the term because Democrats dislike it, and Hertzberg calls use of the term "a minor irritation" and also "the partisan equivalent of flashing a gang sign".

Nicole Holliday has described it as demonstrating affiliation, and said "Language is contagious, especially emotionally charged political language... Most of the time, we don't have the cognitive bandwidth to think very hard about every single word that we're using. We just use it because it's what other people do." Larry Glickma commented that lack of awareness "shows how normalized it's become", comparing it to a "schoolyard taunt".

== Grammar ==
Among authors of dictionaries and usage guides who state that the use of Democrat as an adjective is ungrammatical are Roy H. Copperud, Bergen Evans, and William and Mary Morris. In particular, the latter have written: "It is the idiotic creation of some of the least responsible members of the Republican Party."

In 2005, Ruth Walker, who has been the long-time language columnist for The Christian Science Monitor, while stating that Democratic is the correct term in most instances, placed the adjectival use of Democrat within a broader trend:

We're losing our inflections—the special endings we use to distinguish between adjectives and nouns, for instance. There's a tendency to modify a noun with another noun rather than an adjective. Some may speak of 'the Ukraine election' rather than 'the Ukrainian election' or 'the election in Ukraine', for instance. It's 'the Iraq war' rather than 'the Iraqi war', to give another example.

In 2012, the British magazine The Economist stated:

The real reason 'Democrat Party' is wrong is not because it's ungrammatical, but because it's incorrect in another way—the party is simply not named the Democrat Party, but the Democratic Party. Calling it anything else is discourteous.

== History ==
=== 19th century ===
In American history, many parties were named by their opponents (Federalists, Loco-Focos, Know Nothings, Populists, Dixiecrats), including the Democrats themselves, as the Federalists in the 1790s used Democratic Party as a term of ridicule.

Addressing a gathering of Michigan Republicans in 1889, New Hampshire Republican Congressman Jacob H. Gallinger said:

The great Democrat party, laying down the sceptre of power in 1860, after ruling this country under free trade for a quarter of a century, left our treasury bankrupt, and gave as a legacy to the Republican party, a gigantic rebellion and a treasury without a single dollar of money in it.

According to the Oxford English Dictionary, the term was used by the press in London, England, as a synonym for the more common Democratic Party in 1890:

Whether a little farmer from South Carolina named Tillman is going to rule the Democrat Party in America—yet it is this, and not output, on which the proximate value of silver depends.

=== Early 20th century ===
The 1919 New Teachers' and Pupils' Cyclopaedia entry for Woodrow Wilson states that "In 1912, Wilson was the Democrat Party nominee for President ..." On July 14, 1922, a newspaper in Keytesville, Missouri, posted an advertisement for its primary elections with the Democratic candidates identified as "Representing: Democrat Party".

=== Late 20th century ===
The noun-as-adjective has been used by Republican leaders since the 1940s, and in most GOP national platforms since 1948 and began being popularized by Brazilla Carroll Reece in 1946. By the early 1950s, the term was in widespread use among Republicans of all factions. When Senator Thruston Ballard Morton became chairman of the Republican National Committee in 1959, he indicated that he had always said Democratic Party and would continue to do so, which contrasted with his predecessor, Meade Alcorn, and with National Republican Senatorial Committee chairman Barry Goldwater, both of whom used Democrat Party. According to Congressional Quarterly, at the 1968 Republican National Convention "the GOP did revert to the epithet of 'Democrat' party. The phrase had been used in 1952 and 1956 but not in 1960 and 1964".

According to William Safire, Minnesota Governor Harold Stassen, campaign manager to Republican Wendell Willkie during the 1940 presidential campaign, explained that because the Democratic Party was at that time partly controlled by undemocratic city bosses, "by Hague in New Jersey, Pendergast in Missouri and Kelly-Nash in Chicago, [it] should not be called a 'Democratic Party.' It should be called the 'Democrat Party.'"

Columnist Russell Baker wrote in 1976:

The origin of this illiterate phrase, goes back, I believe to the era of Sen. Joseph R. McCarthy ... The chief trouble with "the Democrat party" is that it makes the Republicans saying it sound both illiterate and coy, and, so, is like a shotgun that is all kick and no fire ... A party whose membership is down to 22 percent of the electorate, as the Republican party is, hardly needs ways to irritate voters from the opposing party whom it must seduce if it is to succeed.

During a vice-presidential debate in October 1976, candidate Bob Dole referred to what he called "Democrat wars." Later in the month, Dole denied his having said it.

During the 1984 Republican National Convention, use of the term was a point of contention among the delegates. When a member of the Republican platform committee asked unanimous consent to change the phrasing of a platform amendment to read Democrat Party instead of Democratic Party, New York Representative Jack Kemp objected, saying that would be "an insult to our Democratic friends;" the committee dropped the proposal.

Newt Gingrich, in his efforts in the 1980s and 1990s to produce a Republican majority in the United States House of Representatives, relied heavily on words and phrases that cast Democrats in a negative light. The phrase Democrat Party gained new currency when the Republican Party, led by Gingrich, gained control of the House of Representatives in 1994.

In 1996, the wording throughout the Republican Party platform was changed from Democratic Party to Democrat Party: Republican leaders "explained they wanted to make the subtle point that the Democratic Party had become elitist". A proposal to use the term in the August 2008 Republican platform for similar reasons was voted down, with leaders choosing to use Democratic Party. "We probably should use what the actual name is," said Mississippi Governor Haley Barbour, the panel's chairman. "At least in writing."

=== 21st century ===
Following his inauguration in 2001, President George W. Bush often used the noun-as-adjective when referring to the Democratic Party. Ruth Marcus, an opinion writer and columnist for The Washington Post, wrote in 2006, "The derisive use of 'Democrat' in this way was a Bush staple during the recent campaign".

Bush spoke of the "Democrat majority" in his 2007 State of the Union Address, although the advance copy that was given to members of Congress read "Democratic majority". Democrats complained about the use of Democrat as an adjective in the address; John Podesta, White House Chief of Staff under Bush's predecessor Bill Clinton, said it was "like nails on a chalkboard", although congressional historian Julian E. Zelizer has opined that "It's hard to disentangle whether that's an intentional slight". Political analyst Charlie Cook doubted it was a deliberate attempt to offend Democrats, saying Republicans "have been [using the term] so long that they probably don't even realize they're doing it".

Bush joked about the issue in a February 4, 2007 speech to House Democrats, stating "Now look, my diction isn't all that good. I have been accused of occasionally mangling the English language. And so I appreciate you inviting the head of the Republic Party."

Donald Trump has used the phrase repeatedly, both during his 2016 presidential campaign and in his first term as president. In a July 2018 campaign rally, he said that "The Democratic Party sounds too good so I don't want to use that, OK?" He added, "I call it the Democrat Party. It sounds better rhetorically." At a September 2018 rally he suggested that "When you see 'Democratic Party,' it's wrong. There's no name, 'Democratic Party.'" At the Conservative Political Action Conference in 2019, he stated he liked to say, "the 'Democrat Party,' because it doesn't sound good. But that's all the more reason I use it, because it doesn't." During the first White House Coronavirus Task Force press conference, he advanced this usage with, "... governors including Democratic—or Democrat, as I call them—governors—which is actually the correct term."

During the 2020 United States presidential election, a conservative advocacy group created the website "Democrat Voters Against Joe Biden", in an apparent attempt to respond to Republican Voters Against Trump. According to The Daily Beast, the former found only one registered Democrat for its testimonies by September 2020; The Daily Beast opined that the name of the organization is a clue that its founders were unfamiliar with how registered Democrats refer to themselves.

In February 2021, an Associated Press article said that "Using Democrat as a pejorative is now so common that it's almost jarring to hear a Republican or conservative commentator accurately say 'Democratic Party'."

=== Media organizations ===
According to the left-leaning media watchdog Media Matters for America, the "ungrammatical" and "partisan" use of the phrase Democrat Party has "echoed Republicans" with its use in the Associated Press, CNN, The New York Times, The Wall Street Journal, and the Chicago Tribune.

NPR directed its staff in 2010 to use the adjective Democratic rather than Democrat. According to Ron Elving, NPR's senior Washington editor, it was the organization's policy to call parties by the name that they use to refer to themselves, saying: "We should not refer to Democrat ideas or Democrat votes. Any deviation from that by NPR reporters on air or online should be corrected".

== Responses ==
In the mid-1950s, members of the Democratic National Committee proposed using "Publican Party" instead of "Republican Party". The committee failed to accept the proposal, "explaining that Republican is the name by which our opponents' product is known and mistrusted". Sherman Yellen suggested "The Republicants" as suitably comparable in terms of negative connotation in an April 29, 2007, Huffington Post column.

On the February 26, 2009 edition of Hardball with Chris Matthews, California Republican Representative Darrell Issa referred to "a Democrat Congress". The host, Chris Matthews, responded by saying:

Well, I think the Democratic Party calls itself the Democratic Party, not the Democrat Party. Do we have to do this every night? Why do people talk like this? Is this just fighting words to get the name on?

Issa denied that he intended to use "fighting words", to which Matthews replied, "They call themselves the Democratic Party. Let's just call people what they call themselves and stop the Mickey Mouse here—save that for the stump."

In March 2009, after Representative Jeb Hensarling (R–Texas) repeatedly used the phrase Democrat Party when questioning U.S. Office of Management and Budget director Peter Orszag, Representative Marcy Kaptur (D–Ohio) said:

I'd like to begin by saying to my colleague from Texas that there isn't a single member on this side of the aisle that belongs to the "Democrat Party". We belong to the Democratic Party. So the party you were referring to doesn't even exist. And I would just appreciate the courtesy when you're referring to our party ... to refer to it as such.
