= The Democrat (newspaper) =

Australian weekly newspaper

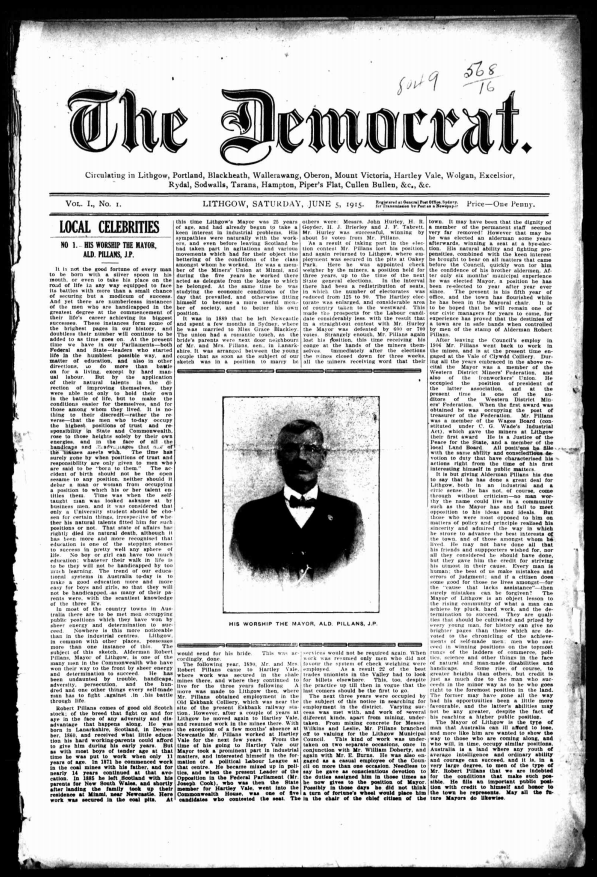
The front page of The Democrat on 5 June 1915

The Democrat was a weekly English language newspaper published in Lithgow, New South Wales, Australia.

== History ==
First printed and published on 5 June 1915 by Rudolph Schulstad for the Doogood Printing Company. It was published from 1915 - 1916. The paper was circulated in Lithgow, Portland, Blackheath, Wallerawang, Oberon, Mount Victoria, Hartley Valley, Wolgan, Excelsior, Rydal, Sodwalls, Tarana, Piper's Flat, Cullen Bullen, and other towns in New South Wales, Australia.

== Digitisation ==
The paper has been digitised as part of the Australian Newspapers Digitisation Program of the National Library of Australia.

== See also ==
- List of newspapers in Australia
- List of newspapers in New South Wales
