= Olmo =

Olmo may refer to:

- Olmo, Haute-Corse, a commune on Corsica, France
- Olmo (surname)
- Olmo grapes, a grape variety
- Olmo (2025 film), an American and Mexico co-production film
- OLMo, a family of open language models
