= July 1972 =

Month of 1972

<<	July 1972					>>
Su	Mo	Tu	We	Th	Fr	Sa
						1
2	3	4	5	6	7	8
9	10	11	12	13	14	15
16	17	18	19	20	21	22
23	24	25	26	27	28	29
30	31

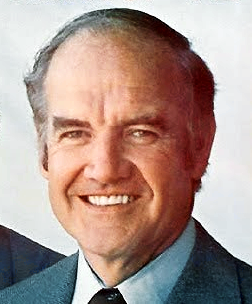
July 14, 1972: George McGovern gives televised speech after most viewers have gone to bed

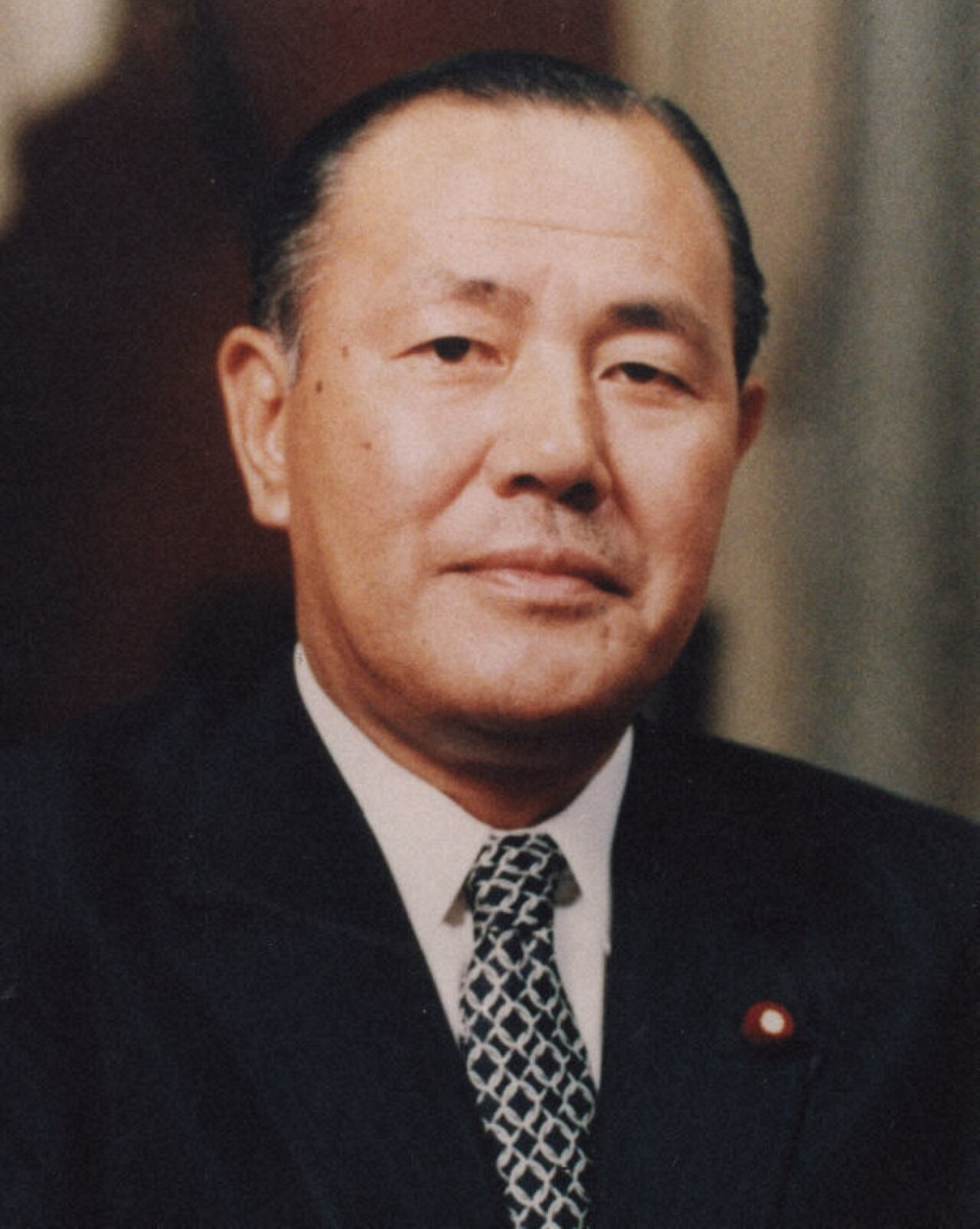
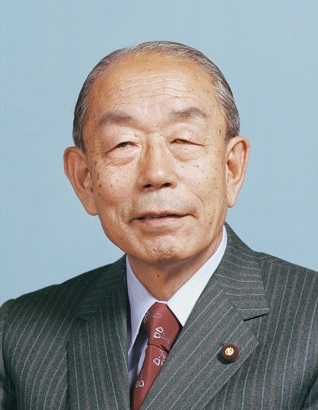
July 5, 1972: Tanaka defeats Fukuda, becomes new Prime Minister of Japan

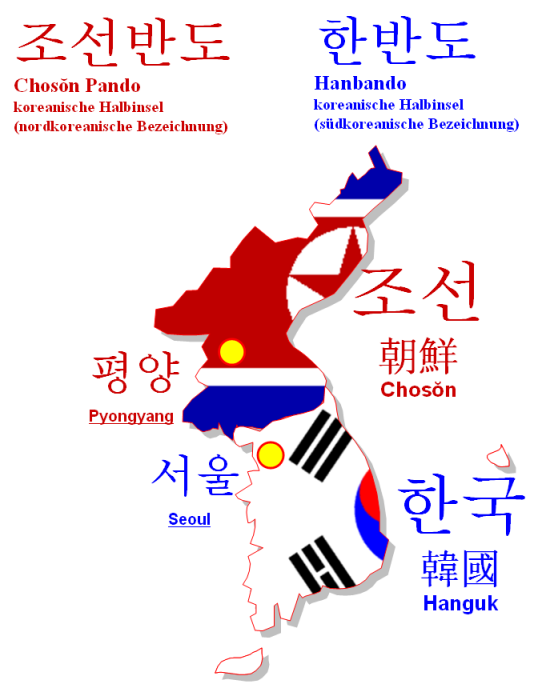
July 4, 1972: North and South Korea simultaneously announce reunification conference

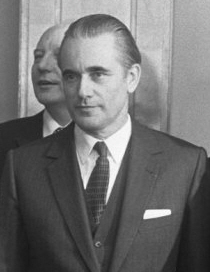
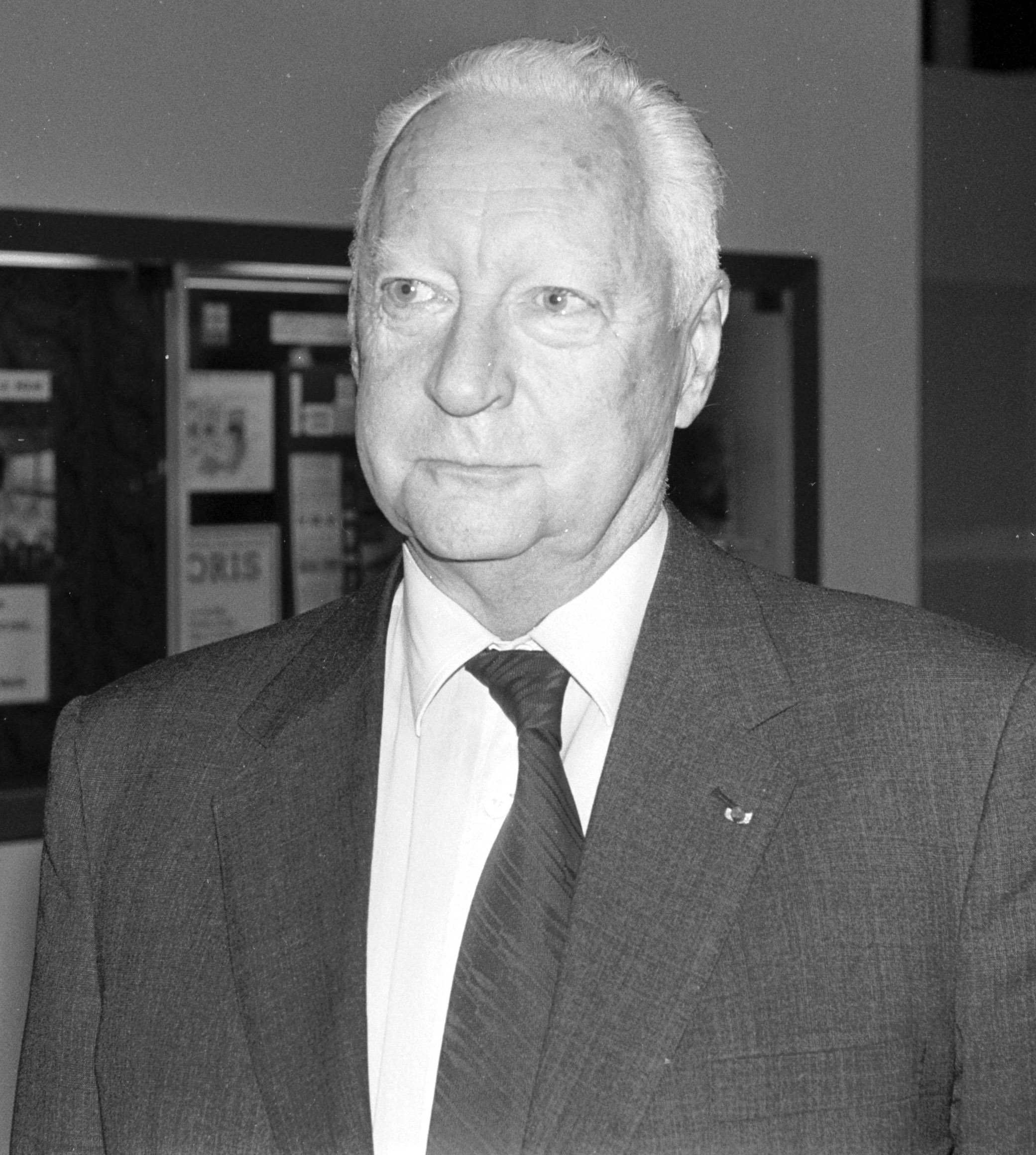
July 5, 1972: French prime minister Chaban-Delmas fired, replaced by Messmer

The following events occurred in July 1972:

== July 1, 1972 (Saturday) ==
- John N. Mitchell, who had resigned as the United States Attorney General to head the Committee to Re-elect the President, quit that job, ostensibly to reconcile with his wife, Martha. Mitchell was later convicted of conspiracy arising from his role in the Watergate scandal during his tenure at CRP.
- Gloria Steinem published the first issue of Ms. magazine, with Wonder Woman on the cover and the title "Wonder Woman For President". Steinem wanted to lobby DC comics to display Wonder Woman as a feminist hero because she felt that new images of Wonder Woman in the 1960s objectified her. By including Wonder Woman on the cover of Ms., Steinem was able to encourage Dick Giordano to reinstate Wonder Woman's truth lasso, bracelets, and her origin story.
- The first official UK Gay Pride Rally was held in London. July 1 was chosen as the nearest Saturday to the third anniversary of the six-day Stonewall riots in New York City during the period from June 28 to July 3, 1969. The rally attracted approximately 2,000 participants.

== July 2, 1972 (Sunday) ==
- The musical Fiddler on the Roof closed on Broadway after a record 3,242 performances. With music by Jerry Bock and lyrics by Sheldon Harnick, Fiddler had first been performed on September 22, 1964.
- The North Slope Borough, Alaska, was created. Lying above the Arctic Circle, the borough, similar to a county, is the northernmost state subdivision in the United States.

== July 3, 1972 (Monday) ==
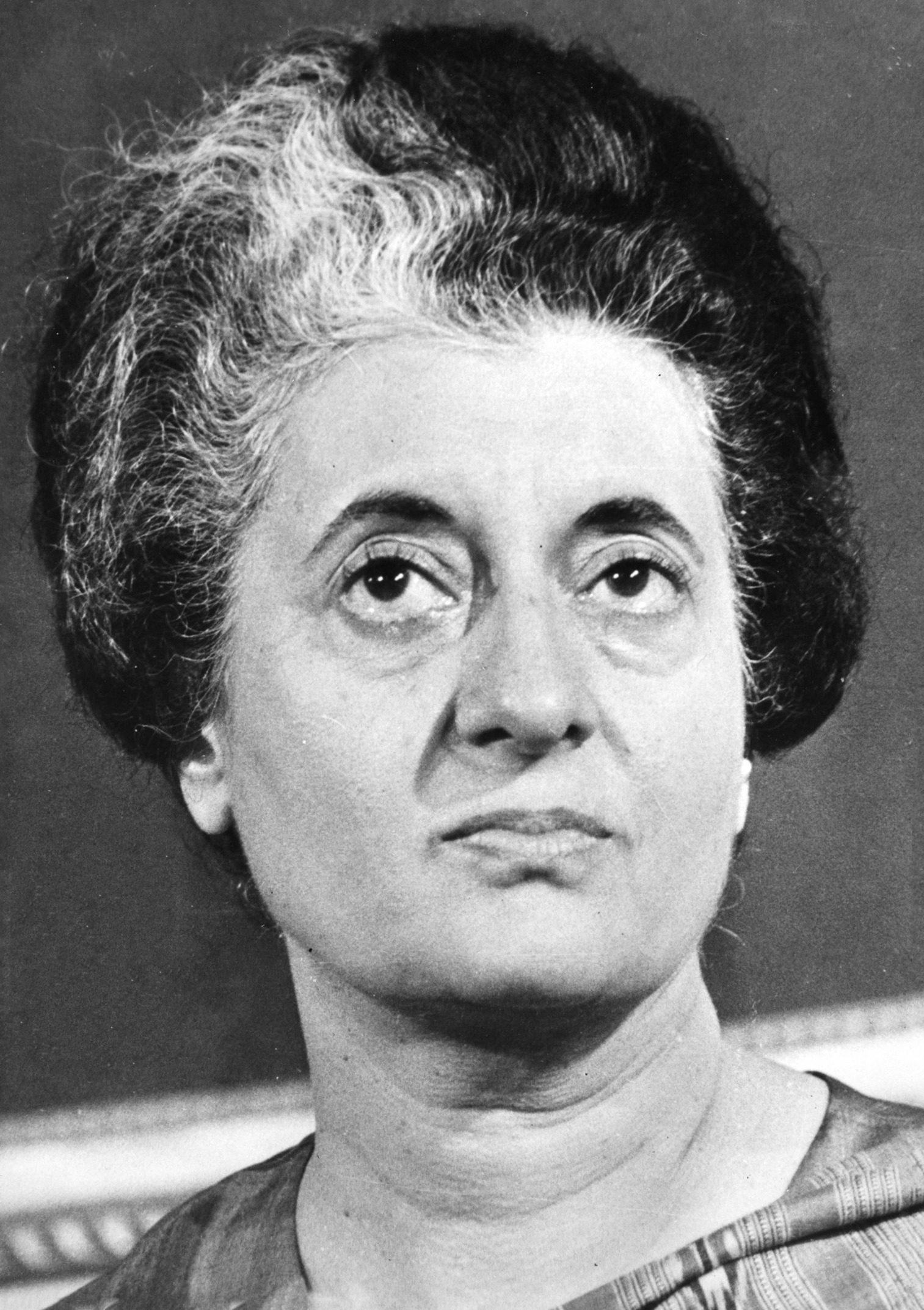
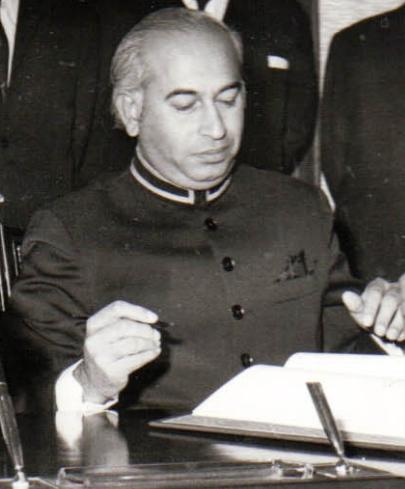
Gandhi and Bhutto of India and Pakistan
- Prime Minister of India Indira Gandhi and President of Pakistan Zulfikar Ali Bhutto signed the Simla Agreement, resolving to peacefully negotiate future disputes, releasing prisoners of war, and withdrawing their military forces behind their sides of a 460-mile long border.

== July 4, 1972 (Tuesday) ==
- At 10:00 a.m., announcements were made simultaneously in North Korea and South Korea that the two nations had secretly negotiated an agreement to discuss reunification.
- Born: Craig Spearman, New Zealand cricketer; in Auckland

== July 5, 1972 (Wednesday) ==
- In a vote to replace outgoing Prime Minister Eisaku Satō, Japan's ruling Liberal Democratic Party leaders selected Kakuei Tanaka over Sato's protege, Foreign Minister Takeo Fukuda, on the second ballot by a 282–190 majority. Masayoshi Ohira, who threw his support to Tanaka after a first ballot bid, replaced Fukuda as Foreign Minister. Fukuda, Ohira, and the other original candidate, Takeo Miki, would all eventually attain the Prime Minister post. As the new LDP leader, Tanaka received majority approval in both Houses of the Diet the following day.
- In the Japanese village of Kami in the Kōchi Prefecture on Shikoku Island, a levee collapsed at Lake Shinji, killing at least 61 people as part of a series of flood disasters that would kill 447 people and injure 1,056 in the 11-day period from July 3 to July 13.
- France's President Georges Pompidou fired Prime Minister Jacques Chaban-Delmas, who had been under investigation because of income taxes. Pompidou then exercised his right to select a new Premier, picking Pierre Messmer to succeed him.
- In San Francisco, a team of FBI agents stormed a hijacked Pacific Southwest Airlines jet, and killed the two men who had been holding 86 people on board Flight 710 hostage. One passenger, E.H. Stanley Carter of Quebec, was killed in the crossfire and two other men were wounded, including actor Victor Sen Yung, who portrayed Hop Sing on the TV series Bonanza.

== July 6, 1972 (Thursday) ==
- Heavy rains began in southern Japan, triggering landslides that would kill 183 people, including 25 on the island of Amakusa, part of the Kumamoto Prefecture. The debris reportedly swept down mountainsides to bury the villages of Ryugatake, Kuratake and Himedo. There were a total of 122 fatalities from 5 to 13 July.
- The first payment of "hush money", via the Committee to Re-Elect the President, to the Watergate burglars, was made. Over eight months, lasting until March 22, 1973, almost $430,000 was paid to the men to keep them from implicating the White House in the break-in of DNC headquarters.
- Born: Daniel Andrews, Australian politician, Premier of Victoria since 2014; in Williamstown, Victoria
- Died:
  - Athenagoras I, 86, Patriarch of Greek Orthodox Church since 1948
  - Brandon deWilde, 30, child actor, was killed when his car skidded off the road during a thunderstorm near Lakewood, Colorado and struck a parked construction truck. De Wilde had been nominated for an Oscar at age 10 for his performance in the film Shane

== July 7, 1972 (Friday) ==
- Harold B. Lee was formally ordained as the 11th President of the Church of Jesus Christ of Latter-day Saints (LDS Church), succeeding Joseph Fielding Smith, who had died five days earlier. At 73, Lee was the youngest church president in 40 years.
- United Nations Secretary-General Kurt Waldheim, who was later shown to have been an active participant in the Holocaust, visited the former Nazi concentration camp at Auschwitz
- Irish Republican Army leaders were secretly flown to London to meet with British officials to discuss a settlement in Northern Ireland.
- Born: Lisa Leslie, American pro basketball star, for the Los Angeles Sparks and MVP of Women's National Basketball Association (WNBA) in 2001, 2004, and 2006; in Gardena, California
- Died: Former King Talal of Jordan, 63, who had been monarch from 1951 until 1952 until being forced to abdicate because of schizophrenia

== July 8, 1972 (Saturday) ==
- A three-year, $750,000,000 deal, for the Soviet Union to purchase grain from the United States, was announced by Henry Kissinger from the "Western White House" at San Clemente. The Soviets, who needed to make up for agricultural shortfalls, agreed to purchase the grain on credit at 6 1/8% annual interest, the standard rate for the Commodity Credit Corporation of the U.S. Department of Agriculture, whose Secretary, Earl Butz, had conferred with his counterpart, Soviet Agriculture Minister Vladimir Matskevich.
- Palestinian author and spokesman Ghassan Kanafani was assassinated in Beirut, when a bomb destroyed his car shortly after he started it. The blast, which was believed to have been arranged by Israeli forces in retaliation for the Lod Airport massacre, killed Kanafani's 18-year-old niece as well.
- Born: Sourav Ganguly, Indian cricketer; in Calcutta

== July 9, 1972 (Sunday) ==
- At 04:00:01.3 UTC (6:00 in the morning local time), the Soviet Union conducted an industrial nuclear explosion of a 3.8-Kiloton explosive in Krestishche gas field in Ukraine, known as Operation Fakel, to extinguish a gas well fire that had burning for more than a year near the village of Khrestyshche in the Kharkiv region of Ukraine.
- The body of the late Kwame Nkrumah was returned to Ghana for burial in his home village of Nkroful. Nkrumah, who had been Ghana's first President before being deposed and exiled, had died on April 27.
- A ceasefire between the Irish Republican Army and British forces effectively came to an end when British troops killed five civilians in Belfast, three of whom were teenagers. Although the Irish Republican Army had killed many Protestant civilians during the ceasefire period. and two British Soldiers only minutes before the ceasefire came into effect on the 26th June 1972

== July 10, 1972 (Monday) ==
- The MK-ULTRA program of the U.S. Central Intelligence Agency, testing drugs for mind control on unsuspecting people, was terminated after 19 years by the CIA official in charge, Dr. Sidney Gottlieb. The existence of the project would not be revealed publicly until 1977 hearings by a U.S. Senate investigative committee.
- The Indian News Agency reported that at least 24 people had been killed during the previous month in the Chandaka Forest in the Indian state of Odisha.
- An intentionally set fire on board the aircraft carrier USS Forrestal as it sat in port in Norfolk, Virginia, caused USD $7,000,000 worth of damage, and was the largest single act of sabotage in United States Navy history. Seaman apprentice Jeffrey Allison was later convicted of having started the blaze. The Forrestal had been the site of a fire in 1967 that had killed 132 people.
- A total solar eclipse was visible over northeastern Asia and northern America.
- Born: Sofía Vergara, Colombian-born American TV actress known for Modern Family; in Barranquilla

== July 11, 1972 (Tuesday) ==
- The long anticipated chess match between world champion Boris Spassky of the Soviet Union, and United States champion Bobby Fischer, began in Iceland at Reykjavík, nine days and seven minutes after the original start date. With no opponent present, Spassky made his opening move at 5:00 pm by moving his queen's pawn forward two spaces in the first of 24 games. Fischer walked into the 2,500-seat Reykjavík Sports Hall minutes later.
- U.S. Senator George McGovern of South Dakota was assured the Democratic presidential nomination after his chief rivals, Hubert H. Humphrey and Edmund S. Muskie, announced that they would release their delegates to him.
- Apollo 15 astronauts David Scott, Alfred Worden and James Irwin were reprimanded for carrying 400 stamped envelopes to the Moon and back as a favor for West German stamp dealer Herman Sieger.

== July 12, 1972 (Wednesday) ==
- The "Intersputnik" Treaty took effect, formally creating the "Organization for Cooperation of Socialist Countries in Telephone and Postal Communications". The agreement, which included sharing of communications and satellite technology between Communist nations, had been signed on November 15, 1971, by representatives from Albania, Bulgaria, China, Cuba, Czechoslovakia, East Germany, Hungary, North Korea, Mongolia, Poland, Romania, the USSR, and North Vietnam.
- Died: Drana Bojaxhiu, mother of Mother Teresa

== July 13, 1972 (Thursday) ==
- The British House of Commons narrowly approved the United Kingdom's entry into the European Economic Community, voting to ratify the Treaty of Accession on its third reading, 301–284
- At the 1972 Democratic National Convention in Miami Beach, delegates formally nominated George McGovern as their candidate for President of the United States. McGovern was not able to find a running mate until late in the afternoon, when U.S. Senator Thomas F. Eagleton of Missouri agreed to join the ticket. The formal nomination of Eagleton as the Democratic candidate for Vice-President went on throughout the evening and past midnight, with frivolous votes being cast, and Eagleton did not receive the nomination until 1:51 the next morning. As a result, Senator McGovern was not able to deliver his acceptance speech on live national television until after most viewers had gone to bed.
- NFL owners Robert Irsay (who owned the Los Angeles Rams) and Carroll Rosenbloom (owner of the Baltimore Colts) swapped franchises. "We avoided capital gains taxes by doing it this way", Rosenbloom explained, adding that the value of each team was $19,000,000. The teams and their players did not move when the ownership changed. Later, Irsay would move the Colts to Indianapolis and Rosenbloom's widow would move the Rams to St. Louis.

== July 14, 1972 (Friday) ==
- Because of delays on the night of July 13 in the nomination for his running mate, Democratic Party presidential nominee George McGovern was not able to give his acceptance speech until 2:30 in the morning Eastern Time. McGovern would say later, "I finished at 3:15. Probably the best speech I ever gave in my life ... But how many people saw it at 2:30 or 3 in the morning? I think my wife did. Maybe my mother if she didn't get too sleepy ... But a crowd of 90 million viewers at 9 o'clock ... probably dwindled down to about 3 million."

== July 15, 1972 (Saturday) ==
- Actress Jane Fonda posed for photographs at a North Vietnamese anti-aircraft gun at Hanoi, and the first images were printed in a newspaper in Poland. Pictures of the actress, gazing through the gunsight of a weapon used to shoot down American planes during the ongoing Vietnam War, ran worldwide the next day.
- "Modern Architecture died in St. Louis, Missouri, on July 15, 1972, at 3:32 p.m. (or thereabouts) when the infamous Pruitt–Igoe scheme, or rather several of its slab blocks, were given the final coup de grâce by dynamite", Charles Jencks would write later in an oft-quoted essay that began, "Happily, it is possible to date the death of Modern Architecture to a precise moment in time." Jencks was referring to the tearing down of the Pruitt–Igoe housing project that had won awards for modern design 20 years earlier, but had to be demolished when it proved to be unsuitable to live in.
- Four months after its launch toward the planet Jupiter, Pioneer 10 became the first man-made object to journey through the asteroid belt. On Earth, NASA scientists estimated that there was a 10% chance that the satellite would not survive the seven-month trip. Pioneer would make it through and reach Jupiter by late 1973.
- The ground temperature in Death Valley, at Furnace Creek, reached a record high of 201 °F (95 °C) on a day when the air temperature was 129 °F (55 °C).

== July 16, 1972 (Sunday) ==
- Metropolitan Bishop Demetrios Papadopoulos was selected as the 263rd Ecumenical Patriarch of Constantinople and leader of the Eastern Orthodox Church, taking the name of Demetrios I. During his reign, which lasted until his death in 1991, he worked toward repairing relations with the Roman Catholic Church and the East–West Schism of 1054.
- Mafia kingpin Thomas Eboli, alias "Tommy Ryan", was shot five times and killed in a drive-by shooting as he left his girlfriend's apartment on Lefferts Avenue in Crown Heights, Brooklyn. As boss of the Genovese family since 1969, Eboli had borrowed money from fellow mobster Carlo Gambino to fund a drug operation that had been busted by the police. Frank Tieri succeeded as leader.
- American actors Natalie Wood and Richard Wagner, who had married in 1957 and divorced in 1962, remarried each other aboard the Ramblin' Rose, anchored off Paradise Cove in Malibu, California. Wood and Wagner were married until Wood's mysterious death in November 1981; in 2018, Wagner would be named a person of interest in the investigation into Wood's death.

== July 17, 1972 (Monday) ==
- Two underwater explosions damaged the American destroyer USS Warrington beyond repair in the Gulf of Tonkin. The blasts were believed to have been caused by American mines that had washed away after having been laid in North Vietnam's ports. The Warrington became the only American warship to be lost in the Vietnam War.

== July 18, 1972 (Tuesday) ==
- Egypt's President Anwar Sadat surprised the world with the announcement that he had asked the Soviet Union to withdraw all of their military advisors and other personnel. Sadat, who had concluded that the presence of the Soviets hindered his ability to govern Egypt, had informed Ambassador Vladimir Vinogradov of his decision ten days earlier, then sent Prime Minister Aziz Sedki to Moscow on July 13 to inform the leadership there. More than 20,000 Soviets left the country after Sadat's order.
- The San Diego Padres came close to a no-hitter against the Philadelphia Phillies when Steve Arlin gave up a ninth-inning two-out single to Denny Doyle which broke up the bid.
- Died: Göran Gentele, 54, a Swedish conductor who had recently appointed director of the Metropolitan Opera, was killed in an auto accident, along with two of his daughters, while on vacation in Italy on the island of Sardinia. Gentele, who had formally taken over "The Met" on June 30, was driving with his family near Olbia when his car collided head-on with an oncoming truck.

== July 19, 1972 (Wednesday) ==
- In the Battle of Mirbat, Nine British Special Air Service troopers, commanded by Captain Mike Kealy, successfully repelled an invasion by more than 250 guerrillas seeking to overthrow the government of Oman.
- The Salvadoran military sent troops and armor into the University of El Salvador and arrested more than 800 students and members of the faculty. The University was closed for two years.
- The guided missile frigate USS Biddle was attacked by five North Vietnamese MiGs, in two raids, off the coast of North Vietnam. They were repulsed by missiles and gunfire, with no damage incurred by the Biddle. One MiG was destroyed by a Terrier missile, with a second possibly destroyed.
- A six month old baby, Alan Jack was killed by a bomb planted by the Provisional Irish Republican Army in Strabane, Northern Ireland
- Born: David Lammy, Foreign Secretary of the United Kingdom since 2024; in Holloway, London

== July 20, 1972 (Thursday) ==
- Sun Pinghua of the People's Republic of China arrived in Tokyo to meet with Japan's Foreign Minister Masayoshi Ohira, renewing Chinese-Japanese relations for the first time since the end of World War II.
- Lynne Cox, a 15-year-old girl, set a new record for swimming the English Channel, becoming the first person to make the crossing from England to France in less than ten hours. Her record of 9 hours and 57 minutes would be broken later in the year by Richard Hart, whose record she would break the following years.
- Police in Canberra destroyed the Aboriginal Tent Embassy that had been set up on the grounds of the Australian Parliament in January. A new set of structures was put up within a week.
- Died: Friedrich Flick, 89, German billionaire who used slave labor in World War II

== July 21, 1972 (Friday) ==
- At 2:10 pm, a car bomb exploded at a bus station in Belfast, Northern Ireland, followed six minutes later by a bomb that wrecked a hotel. Over the next hour, explosives went off across the city at train stations, bus stops, and other civilian targets. Nine people were killed and 130 injured in what became known as "Bloody Friday", a retaliation for January's "Bloody Sunday". The next day, British troops began a new offensive against the Irish Republican Army.
- A malfunctioning signal at El Cuervo de Sevilla led to Spain's worst railroad accident ever. At 7:36 a.m., an express train bound from Seville to Cadiz crashed head-on into a local passenger train coming the opposite direction. Seventy-six people were killed and another 130 were injured.
- Born: Catherine Ndereba, Kenyan marathon runner, world champion in 2003 and 2007; in Gatunganga
- Died:
  - Jigme Dorji Wangchuck, 44 the King of Bhutan, since 1952, died while on a visit to Kenya. After a brief dispute over succession, his 16-year-old son, Jigme Singye Wangchuck, assumed the throne of the Himalayan nation.
  - Ralph Craig, 83, American runner, 1912 Olympic gold medalist;

== July 22, 1972 (Saturday) ==
- The Soviet space probe Venera 8 landed on the planet Venus at 1:29 pm Moscow time (1029 GMT). With an improved cooling system and structure, the satellite transmitted data for 50 minutes before temperatures of 470 °C (almost 900 °F) and an atmospheric pressure of 90 bars caused a shutdown. The Venera 7 probe in 1970 had been the first man-made object to land on Venus, but tipped over and sent only limited data.
- Vice President of the United States Spiro Agnew would officially be a candidate for re-election, as President Richard M. Nixon announced from the White House that Agnew would be his running mate in 1972. The selection ended speculation that a more moderate candidate would be picked, and Agnew was considered by some to be the front runner for the Presidency in 1976.
- Taiwan's President Chiang Kai-shek fell into a coma a few days after what would prove to be his last public appearance. The 84-year-old leader, who had first presided over China in 1925, never made a full recovery, and would die in 1975.
- Cincinnati Reds pitcher Wayne Simpson was offered a $2,000 bribe, by an anonymous caller, to ensure a loss in his game against the Pittsburgh Pirates. Simpson reported the bribe offer and went on to pitch the game, a 6–3 win for the Reds.
- Born: Keyshawn Johnson, NFL wide receiver, 1996–2006; in Los Angeles
- Died: Chi Chi, 14, London Zoo's giant panda

== July 23, 1972 (Sunday) ==
- The Earth Resources Technology Satellite, ERTS 1, was launched from California's Vandenberg Air Force Base at 11:08 a.m. (1908 GMT). Designed at a cost of $175 million, the satellite, first of the series of Landsat vehicles, was placed at an altitude of 913 km (567 mi) into a polar orbit that would carry it over every part of the globe over a period of 18 days, and transmit photographs at a resolution of 80 meters. The first Landsat was operational until January 6, 1978.
- Born: Marlon Wayans, American comedian; in New York City

== July 24, 1972 (Monday) ==
- Pharmacologist David Wong of Eli Lilly and Company tested Bryan Molloy's chemical compound #L-110,140 and found that it inhibited uptake of serotonin without uptake of norepinephrine. The compound, fluoxetine, would be first tested on human volunteers in 1976, given U.S. patent No. 4,314,081 in 1982, and put on the market in 1988 as the antidepressant drug Prozac.
- Born: Dewey Smith, American aquanaut; in Kirkwood, Missouri (d. 2009)
- Died: Lance Reventlow, 36, American millionaire playboy, heir to the Woolworth department store fortune, and race car driver, was killed in the crash of his small Cessna 206 airplane during a severe thunderstorm near Aspen, Colorado, along with three other people.

== July 25, 1972 (Tuesday) ==
- The Washington Star ran the headline "Syphilis victims in U.S. Study Went Untreated for 40 Years", as reporter Jean Heller broke the story of the infamous Tuskegee Study. Peter Buxtun, who had worked for the Public Health Service, first told the story to Edith Lederer, who then assigned the story to Heller. The next day, an assistant secretary with the HEW held a press conference to announce that he was shocked and horrified that the study had gone on from 1932 to 1972. More than 100 men infected with syphilis died while believing that they were being treated. A suit was settled in 1974 for $10,000,000 divided among 600 survivors and decedent's families. A personal apology was made to the last five survivors on May 16, 1997.
- At a press conference in Custer, South Dakota, Democratic vice-presidential nominee Thomas F. Eagleton disclosed that he had three psychiatric hospitalizations between 1960 and 1966, conceding that "I was on my own admission hospitalized at Barnes Hospital in St. Louis ... probably four weeks", and that he had undergone electric shock therapy. Although presidential nominee George S. McGovern declared that "I am 1,000 percent for Tom Eagleton and I have no intention of dropping him from the ticket," the press raised questions about whether Senator Eagleton would be emotionally fit, if necessary, to become President of the United States. Eagleton withdrew from the ticket and was replaced by Sargent Shriver.

== July 26, 1972 (Wednesday) ==
- The lucrative contract for construction of the American space shuttle orbiter was awarded to North American Rockwell Corporation.
- President Richard M. Nixon personally asked Alabama Governor George C. Wallace to not run as an independent candidate for the United States presidency in 1972.
- Born: Nathan Buckley, Australian rules football star for Collingwood; in Adelaide

== July 27, 1972 (Thursday) ==
- In a famous American kidnapping that would include a ransom that would be paid and never recovered, Virginia Piper, the wife of the CEO of an investment firm in Minneapolis, was taken from her home in Orono, Minnesota. Mrs. Piper was taken to a state park in northern Minnesota, where she was chained to a tree for two nights until the kidnappers received a one million dollar cash ransom. Two suspects would be convicted of the kidnapping in 1979, but freed after the verdict's reversal. Only $4,000 of the $1,000,000 ransom paid would ever be recovered.
- Test pilot Irving Burroughs flew the first F-15 Eagle jet fighter (the 15-A), at Edwards Air Force Base in California. The F-15 had been developed to establish U.S. air superiority in combat, as the U.S. Secretary of the Air Force told the press that the new jet would "outclimb, outmaneuver and outaccelerate any fighter threat in existence or seen on the horizon", while USAF Major General Benjamin Bellis, who oversaw the F-15's development, said that the jet was "equal to anything the Soviet Union is flying now", including the Soviet Air Force MiG-23.
- Born:
  - Maya Rudolph, American comedian on Saturday Night Live; in Gainesville, Florida
  - Takashi Shimizu, Japanese director of the Ju-On film series; in Maebashi, Gunma Prefecture
  - Takako Fuji, Japanese actress in the Ju-On film series; in Tokyo
- Died: Allen J. Ellender, 81, U.S. Senator from Louisiana since 1937

== July 28, 1972 (Friday) ==
- China, through its embassy in Algeria, cleared up speculation about what had happened to Defense Minister Lin Biao, who had not been seen in public, or referred to by the Beijing government in more than a year. "Lin Piao died September 13, 1971", the official statement began, adding that "He attempted a coup d'état and sought to assassinate Chairman Mao Tse-tung. His plot was foiled and he fled on September 12 toward the Soviet Union in an aircraft which crashed in the People's Republic of Mongolia."
- Born: Elizabeth Berkley, American actress; in Farmington Hills, Michigan
- Died: Helen Traubel, 73, American soprano

== July 29, 1972 (Saturday) ==
- A second Soviet attempt to launch a space station failed when one of the second-stage rockets misfired 162 seconds after launch. The station did not reach orbit and fell into the Pacific Ocean, and two crewed space missions were stood down.
- Born:
  - Anssi Kela, Finnish rock musician; in Kerava
  - Wil Wheaton, American TV actor known for Star Trek: The Next Generation; in Burbank, California

== July 30, 1972 (Sunday) ==
- The Associated Press and the Chinese government controlled Xinhua News Agency reached an agreement to regularly exchange news and photos, marking the first time in 22 years that any American news agency would have a channel with the People's Republic of China.

== July 31, 1972 (Monday) ==
- Operation Motorman began in Northern Ireland at 4:00 in the morning, as 13,000 British troops rolled into the "no go" areas of Belfast, Derry, Lurgan, Armagh, Portadown, Coalisland and Dungannon. At 7:00, administrator William Whitelaw announced, "The British army are now in occupation and control throughout Northern Ireland." Although violence continued in Northern Ireland, it was greatly reduced and never again reached the levels of July 1972. The number of shooting incidents in the three weeks before the operation had been 2,595. In the three weeks that followed, the number dropped to 380.
- Nine civilians were killed in the Claudy bombing in the Northern Ireland village of Claudy in County Londonderry, when three separate car bombs exploded without warning at about 10:30 in the morning on the main street. The event would later become known as "Bloody Monday".
- An explosion incinerated 17 employees at the Box Flat Colliery located at Swansbank outside Ipswich, Queensland. Six were coal miners, another 8 were members of the Mines Rescue Service who had volunteered to fight a fire in the mine, and three others were working in a shed outside the entrance of the No. 5 shaft when the fiery blast occurred at 2:58 in the morning.
- Dick Allen of the Minnesota Twins became only the second major league player in modern times to hit two inside-the-park home runs in a single game, and the first since Ben Chapman in 1932, as the Twins beat the visiting Chicago White Sox, 8–1.

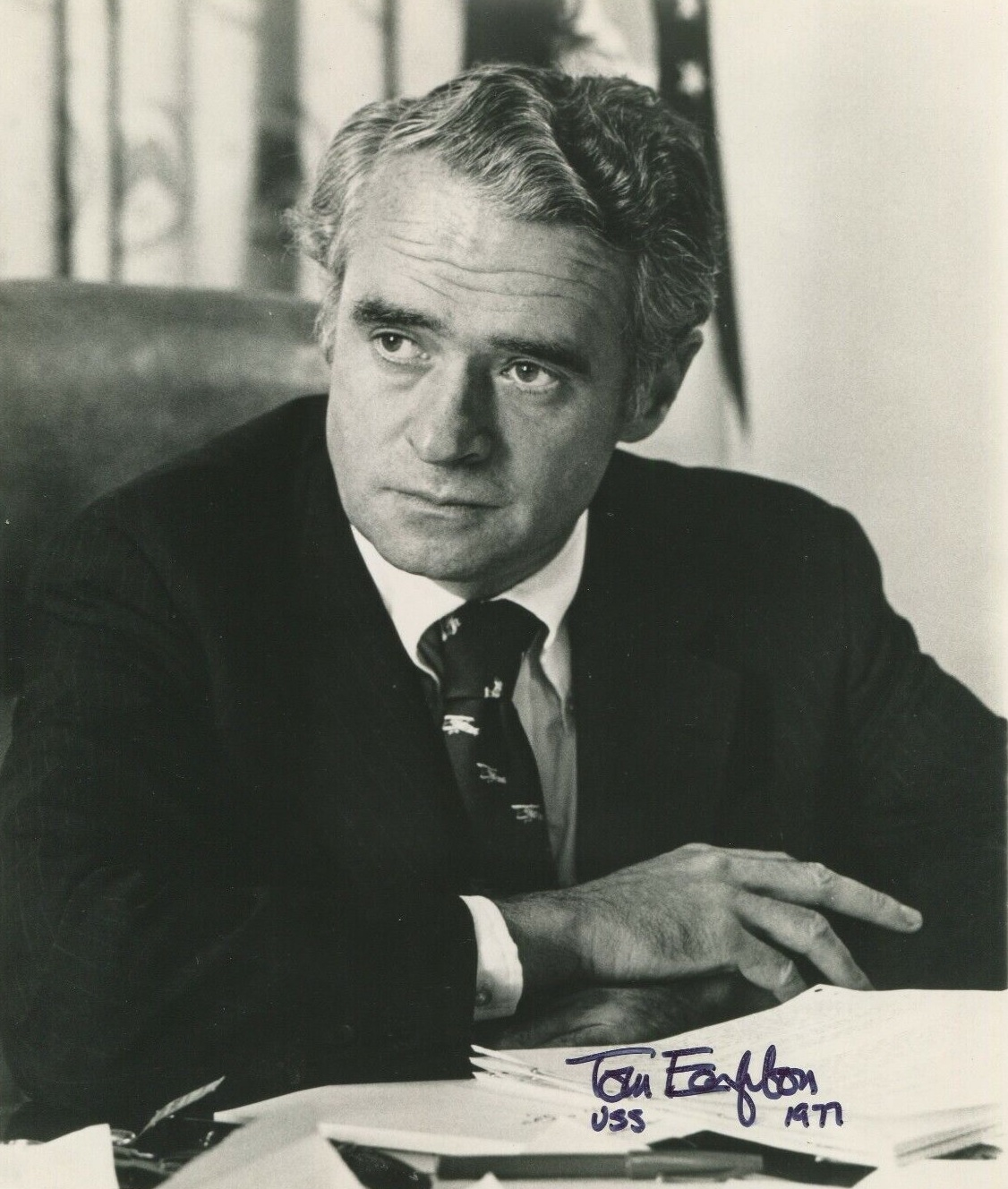
Senator Eagleton, vice-presidential nominee for only 17 days

- The "McGovern-Eagleton '72" campaign ended as Democratic vice-presidential nominee Thomas F. Eagleton resigned from the ticket.
- Delta Air Lines Flight 841 from Detroit was hijacked by five members of the Black Liberation Army as it was approaching Miami. After receiving $1,000,000 ransom, the 86 hostage/passengers were released and the hijackers commandeered the plane to Boston, and then flew 5,000 miles (8,000 km) to Algeria. Four of the hijackers were captured and convicted in 1976, while the elusive fifth, George Wright (who identified himself on the passenger manifest as "Rev. L. Burgess"), was on the run for the next 39 years. Wright would finally be found and arrested in Lisbon, Portugal, on September 26, 2011.
- Died: Paul Henri Spaak, 73, first President of the United Nations General Assembly
