= Olmo (surname) =

Olmo is a surname. Notable people with the surname include:

- Angelica Olmo (born 1996), Italian triathlete
- Antonio Olmo (born 1954), Spanish footballer
- Antonio Olmo (cyclist) (born 1982), Spanish cyclist, brother of Juan
- Bartolomé Madrid Olmo (born 1964), Spanish politician
- Dani Olmo (born 1998), Spanish footballer
- Giuseppe Olmo (1911–1992), Italian road bicycle racer
- Harold Olmo (1909–2006), American viticulturist
- Jesús Olmo (born 1985), Spanish footballer
- Juan Olmo (born 1978), Spanish cyclist, brother of Antonio (cyclist)
- Luis Olmo (1919–2017), Puerto Rican baseball player
- Michael Olmo (born 1999), American rapper and singer known professionally as Iann Dior
- Miquel Olmo (born 1966), Spanish footballer and manager
- Víctor Olmo (born 2001), Spanish footballer
- Walter Olmo (1938–2019), Italian musician and composer
