= Juan Olmo =

Spanish bicycle racer

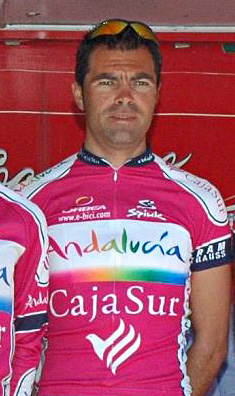
- Olmo in 2008

Personal information
- Full name: Juan Olmo Menacho
- Born: 5 March 1978 (age 48) El Cuervo de Sevilla, Spain

Cycling career
- Sport: Cycling
- Current team: Retired
- Discipline: Road
- Role: Rider

Professional teams
- 2002–2004: Barbot–Torrie
- 2005: Duja–Tavira
- 2006–2008: Andalucía–Paul Versan

Juan Olmo Menacho (born 5 March 1978 in El Cuervo de Sevilla) is a Spanish former cyclist. His brother Antonio is also a cyclist. He rode in the 2007 Vuelta a España.

== Major results ==
2005
1st Stage 5 Tour de Normandie
