= August 1972 =

Month of 1972

<<	August 1972					>>
Su	Mo	Tu	We	Th	Fr	Sa
		1	2	3	4	5
6	7	8	9	10	11	12
13	14	15	16	17	18	19
20	21	22	23	24	25	26
27	28	29	30	31

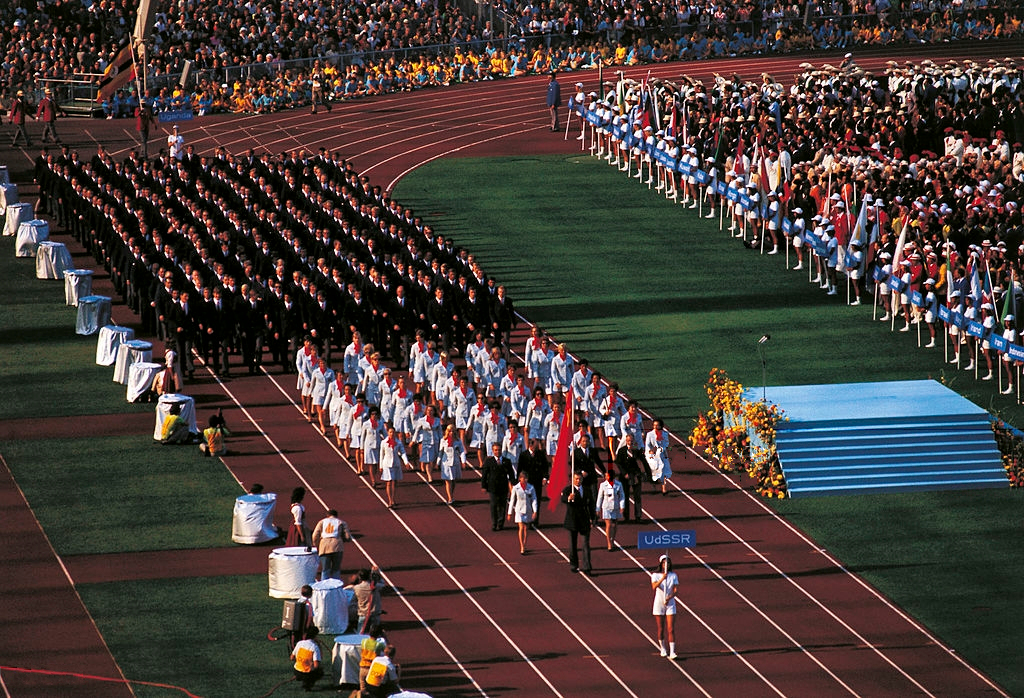
August 26, 1972: Summer Olympics open in Munich

The following events occurred in August 1972:

== August 1, 1972 (Tuesday) ==
- "Bug Suspect Got Campaign Funds", the first article in the famous Watergate investigative series by reporters Carl Bernstein and Bob Woodward, appeared on the front page of The Washington Post.
- Air Botswana, the national airline of the southern African nation, began passenger service with a single Fokker F-27, flying a route covering Gaborone, Manzini, Johannesburg, and Salisbury (now Harare).
- Died: Ray Gunkel, 47, American collegiate and professional wrestler, died from heart trauma a few hours after defeating wrestler Ox Baker in a match in Savannah, Georgia. Although initial reports said that Gunkel "died in the ring", a spokesman said that "He went to the dressing room, showered, dressed, and felt great... He was sitting in a chair, talking to the Savannah promoter... Then as the promoter got up to leave, he fell to the floor." Gunkel, who was found afterward to have had arteriosclerosis, had been punched in the chest during the match, and the resulting hematoma led to a blood clot that caused his death.

== August 2, 1972 (Wednesday) ==
- At Benghazi, Egypt's President Anwar Sadat and Libya's leader, Muammar al-Gaddafi, announced that their two countries would unite into one nation by September 1, 1973. "The Arabs have realized that the challenges of Zionism and imperialism can only be surmounted by a large entity with enormous resources and capabilities", an Egyptian press release stated. The Egypt–Libya union, which never took place, would have had the ninth largest area in the world, at 1,066,407 mi^{2} (2,761,991 km^{2}).

== August 3, 1972 (Thursday) ==
- The "diploma tax", to deter Jewish emigration from the Soviet Union, was enacted by the Supreme Soviet as Decree No. 572: "Citizens of the USSR leaving for permanent residence abroad in other than socialist countries must compensate the State for their education received from institutions of higher education." The tax, of as much as 25,000 rubles, would be abolished in March 1973, but was paid by 1,435 Soviet Jews until pressure forced Moscow to back down.
- By an 88–2 vote, the U.S. Senate ratified the Soviet-American Anti-Ballistic Missile Treaty. Voting against the treaty were Senators James Buckley (R-N.Y.) and James B. Allen (D-Ala.)
- South Korea's President Park Chung Hee issued the "August 3 Decree", officially the Emergency Decree on Economic Stability and Growth, which lowered interest rates and spread out payments on the nation's bank loans.

== August 4, 1972 (Friday) ==
- At 0620 GMT (2:20 a.m. EDT), the Sun released the most powerful blasts of radiation that had been recorded up to that time. The solar radiation was strong enough to cause the explosion of several naval mines in North Vietnam's Haiphong harbor.
- Arthur Bremer, 22, was sentenced to 63 years in prison after being found guilty of having shot and paralyzed Alabama Governor George C. Wallace and wounding three other people in a May 15 shooting. Bremer would be released from the Maryland Correctional Institution - Hagerstown on November 9, 2007, after 35 years.
- Bobby Fischer reached his highest live ELO rating of 2789.7 (if the forfeited Game 2 is not counted toward change of his ELO rating) after a win in Game 10 of World Chess Championship 1972. This highest live ELO rating was not surpassed for almost 22 years.

== August 5, 1972 (Saturday) ==
- With its national convention adjourned, the Democratic National Committee confirmed George McGovern's sixth choice to replace Thomas Eagleton, former Ambassador to France (and Peace Corps founder Sargent Shriver as the party's nominee for Vice-President. McGovern was turned down by Teddy Kennedy, Abraham Ribicoff, Hubert Humphrey, Reuben Askew and Edmund Muskie.

== August 6, 1972 (Sunday) ==
- A baseball game was "called on account of grasshoppers" when millions of the insects swarmed into Hogan Park at Midland, Texas, during the second game of a doubleheader. In the Texas League game, the Amarillo Giants had beaten the Midland Cubs 5–4 in the first game. As Amarillo began the second game, grasshoppers dimmed the lighting and alighted upon many of the 857 spectators. Midland won 2–1 when the game was made up the next day.
- Sixty-five people were killed in Pakistan when a passenger train from Karachi to Rawalpindi crashed into the back of a freight train parked at the Liaquatpur railway station.
- Born: Geri Halliwell, British Spice Girls singer ("Ginger Spice"), in Watford

== August 7, 1972 (Monday) ==
- At 1519 hours GMT (11:19 a.m. EDT), the most powerful solar flare ever measured was observed on Earth.
- Sir Anthony Mason began service on the High Court of Australia, and would serve as Chief Justice from 1987 to 1995.

== August 8, 1972 (Tuesday) ==
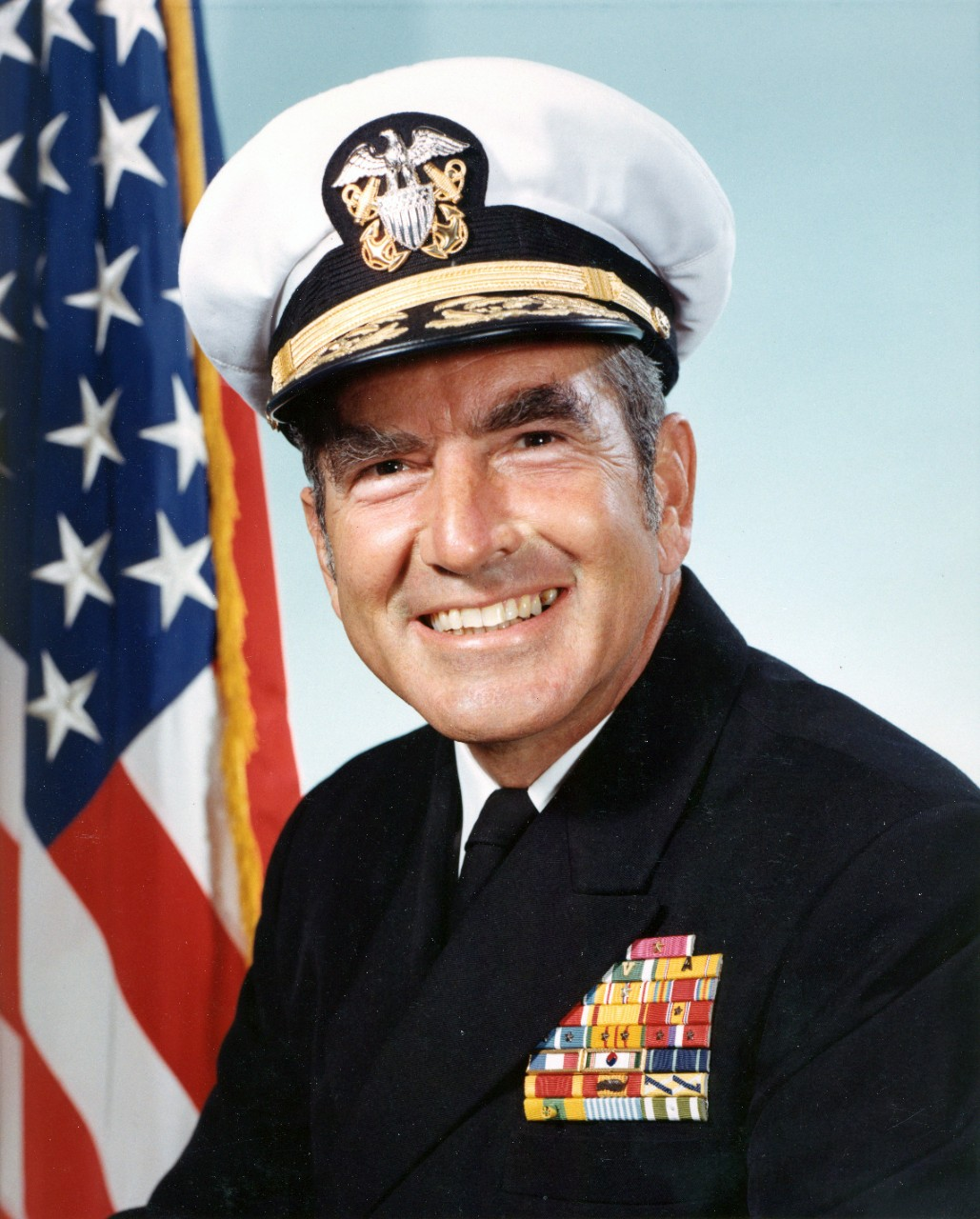
Admiral Zumwalt, CNO, U.S. Navy

- The U.S. Chief of Naval Operations, Admiral Elmo Zumwalt, ordered changes in the United States Navy's rules to permit women to serve on ships, become aviators, and attend the U.S. Naval Academy. Previously, WAVES were limited to stateside service. "There will be some who are concerned", said Zumwalt. "But when you look at the level to which our society has developed, there is no reason in theory, in sociology or in equity why women should not have the same opportunities the men have".

== August 9, 1972 (Wednesday) ==
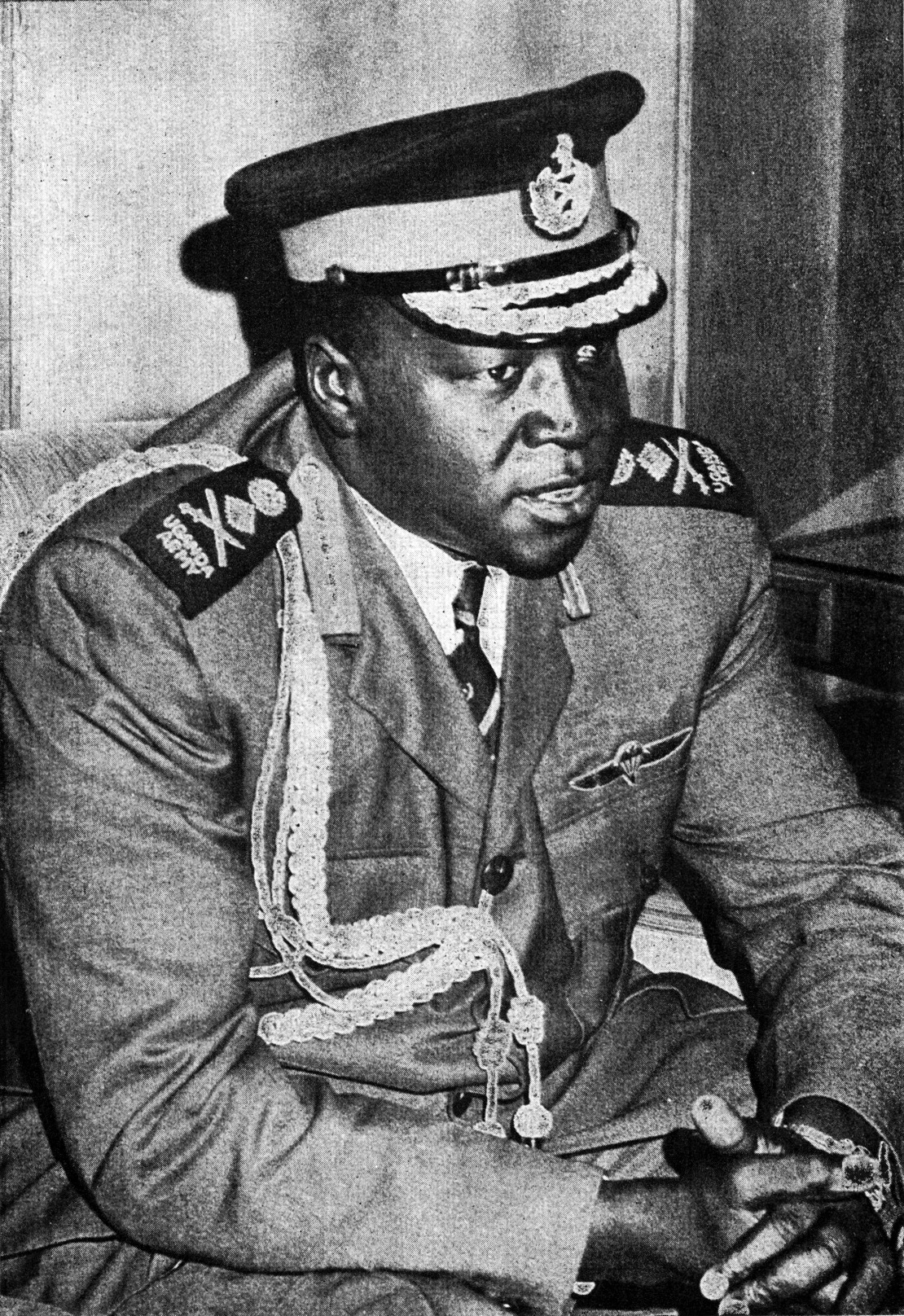
President Idi Amin, who ordered the expulsion of Uganda's Asian community

- Idi Amin, the President of Uganda, summoned Britain's representative and other diplomats to his residence, and announced a decree that all Asians, who were not Ugandan citizens, would have to leave Uganda within 90 days. Between 40,000 and 80,000 of Uganda's Asian residents had opted to keep British citizenship when the former British colony had attained independence.
- Born: A-Mei (Chang Hui-mei), Taiwanese female pop singer, as Amit Kulilay in Beinan

== August 10, 1972 (Thursday) ==
- A meteor came within 58 km (36 mi) of the Earth, entering the atmosphere over Utah at 20:28:29 GMT and departing 101 seconds later at 20:30:10 over Canada, before skipping back out. The fireball was visible in daylight, with the occurrence happening at 2:28 pm local time.

== August 11, 1972 (Friday) ==
- With the deactivation of the 3rd Battalion of the 21st U.S. Infantry, the last American ground combat units were pulled out of South Vietnam. The 1,043-man unit had been assigned to the U.S. airbase at Da Nang. Air and sea operations continued and more than 40,000 U.S. servicemen remained in Vietnam.
- Andrew B. Topping, 27, was arrested at the boat basin at New York's Central Park after paying $1,000 to Stewart J. Henry, an undercover federal agent posing as a killer for hire, to carry out a hit. Topping's intended victim was the President of the United States, Richard M. Nixon. Henry, a U.S. Secret Service agent, negotiated the terms the night before and then completed the sting.
- Died: Max Theiler, 73, South African virologist who developed a vaccine against yellow fever and was awarded the Nobel Prize in 1951

== August 12, 1972 (Saturday) ==
- Arrowhead Stadium opened in Kansas City, Missouri, with a preseason game for the Missouri Governor's Cup.
- The original American Hairless Terrier dog was born. "Josephine" did not produce another carrier of the mutated gene until she was nine years old.
- The Chevrolet Corvair automobile, subject of the first chapter of Ralph Nader's book Unsafe at Any Speed, was exonerated by the National Highway Traffic Safety Administration (NHTSA) in a letter to all Corvair owners. Corvairs had been discontinued three years earlier.
- W. Averell Harriman and Cyrus Vance, the two original U.S. negotiators at the Paris peace talks, said in a press conference that President Nixon had missed an opportunity in 1969 to end the Vietnam War, at a time when the North Vietnamese had withdrawn most of their combat troops from South Vietnam's northernmost provinces.
- Born: Del tha Funkee Homosapien (stage name for Teren Delvon Jones), American rap music artist, in Oakland
- Died: Sister Clara Muhammad, 72, American educator known as the "First Lady of the Nation of Islam" for her marriage to NOI leader Elijah Muhammad

== August 13, 1972 (Sunday) ==
- Former U.S. Attorney General Ramsey Clark returned from North Vietnam, where he had traveled as a private individual as part of a factfinding group. Clark said that he had confirmed that the United States was bombing hospitals and dikes, and that he had been told that American prisoners "will be released immediately when we stop this senseless, murderous bombing and end the war and get out, get home, and get to the business of building the peace and giving happiness to little children around the world". Clark's comments were proven to be false a few days later. The New York Times stated that he had used "poor judgement". In 1974 an investigation into the matter showed that Clark had been "exploited" by the Hanoi regime.
- Born: Kevin Plank, creator of Under Armour, in Kensington, Maryland

== August 14, 1972 (Monday) ==
- In the worst aviation accident in Germany to date, all 156 people on board an Ilyushin Il-62 of East German Interflug were killed when the aircraft crashed near Königs Wusterhausen.
- Born: Yoo Jae-suk, South Korean comedian, in Seoul
- Died: Oscar Levant, 65, American pianist and actor

== August 15, 1972 (Tuesday) ==
- On the 25th anniversary of its independence, India introduced the six digit "PIN Code" for mail delivery. As with the American ZIP code, the name is a backronym. It stands for "Postal Index Number".
- Deep Purple, British Rock Band, played live first night in Japan, in Osaka.
- Born: Ben Affleck, American film actor, in Berkeley, California

== August 16, 1972 (Wednesday) ==
- King Hassan II of Morocco was returning home from a meeting with President Pompidou of France, when his Boeing 727 was fired upon by the rebels within the Moroccan Air Force. Although several people were wounded, the King escaped injury, and the pilot was able to land after falsely stating that Hassan had been killed. While the attempted assassination was taking place, the royal palace was being bombed by others in the plot. As it turned out, Defense Minister Mohammed Oufkir had conspired, with others in the Moroccan armed forces, to stage a coup d'état and to set up a republic. Oufkir died the next day. Officially, it was a suicide, but there were rumors that Hassan himself had executed his former right-hand man. As punishment, Oufkir's family was imprisoned for nearly 20 years.
- Born: Emily Strayer, American musician for the Chicks (formerly known as Dixie Chicks), in Pittsfield, Massachusetts

== August 17, 1972 (Thursday) ==
- On Indonesia's Independence Day, President Suharto decreed changes in the spelling of the Indonesian language in Djakarta, starting with the change of the name of the capital to Jakarta. "Dj" was changed to "J", the old "j" to "y", "nj" to "ny", "sj" to "sy", "tj" to "c", and "ch" to "kh".

== August 18, 1972 (Friday) ==
- A "hotline" between South Korea and North Korea was established, as telephone links between Seoul and Pyongyang were reopened for the first time since the 1950 outbreak of the Korean War.
- Born: Leo Ku, actor and Cantopop singer, in Hong Kong

== August 19, 1972 (Saturday) ==
- The Midnight Special was shown for the first time on television, beginning at 1:00 in the morning on most NBC stations. NBC's experiment, aiming an early morning program at the 18- to 35-year-old audience that might stay up late on Friday nights, proved a success, and the rock concert series ran until 1981.
- Bennet Hanna of Peach Springs, Arizona, was killed when he backed up his car too far on Hualapai Hilltop after dropping friends off at the Havasupai trailhead. The car fell 500 feet (150 m) off the edge of the Grand Canyon.
- The first daytime episode of the second incarnation of American game show The Price Is Right was taped at CBS Television City, to be aired on September 4, 1972.
- Born: Sammi Cheng, actress and Cantopop singer, in Hong Kong

== August 20, 1972 (Sunday) ==
- A conflict within the polygamist Church of the First Born of the Fullness of Times turned violent when church leader Joel LeBaron was tricked into coming to the Mexican town of Ensenada, located in Baja California, then shot to death. The killing had been ordered by Joel's brother, Ervil LeBaron, who had founded the Church of the Lamb of God after being kicked out of the Church of the First Born. Another brother, Verlan LeBaron, took over leadership of the church from Joel. Ervil LeBaron continued to order reprisals against members of his former church, and was eventually captured and convicted of murder, dying in prison in 1981.
- Wattstax, a concert at the Los Angeles Coliseum, attracted 100,000 black citizens, each of whom paid $1 per ticket to watch the Bar-Kays, the Staple Singers, Isaac Hayes and other performers.
- Died: Admiral Harold R. Stark, 91, U.S. Chief of Naval Operations when Pearl Harbor was attacked.

== August 21, 1972 (Monday) ==
- The Copernicus satellite, originally called "Orbiting Astronomical Observatory 3", was launched into orbit. Carrying an 80 cm UV telescope and spectrometers, the Copernicus satellite would transmit data until 1979 and provided detailed information about the stars upon which it was aimed. Astronomer Lyman Spitzer discovered, the day before the launch, that an error had been made in the calculations of the optimum focus for one of the mirrors, and was able to have the problem corrected before Copernicus went into orbit.

== August 22, 1972 (Tuesday) ==
- On a hot August afternoon in Brooklyn, three men robbed a branch of the Chase Manhattan Bank, and their string of bad luck later became the subject of a 1975 film. John Wojtowicz and Salvatore Naturile robbed the bank and found that they had arrived after most of the cash had gone out on an armored car that morning, then were surprised by the police just as they were planning to get away. The crisis, which ended the next morning with Naturile being killed by an FBI agent and Wojtowicz's arrest, was later dramatized in the film Dog Day Afternoon, with Al Pacino as Sonny Wojtowicz.

== August 23, 1972 (Wednesday) ==
- Kakuei Tanaka, the Prime Minister of Japan, was approached by Hiro Hiyama, whose firm was representing aircraft manufacturer Lockheed. Along with Boeing and McDonnell Douglas, Lockheed was competing for a contract to supply jet aircraft to All Nippon Airways. Hiyama made an offer. If Tanaka could use his influence to urge All Nippon to buy Lockheed Tri-Star jets, instead of Boeing 747s or McDonnell's DC-10s, Tanaka would receive 500,000,000 yen (roughly $6,000,000). In October, All Nippon awarded its contract to Lockheed to buy 21 TriStars, and the following August, the first 100 million yen was paid to Tanaka. The kickbacks came to light in 1976, and Tanaka, no longer the Prime Minister, was indicted.

== August 24, 1972 (Thursday) ==
- Hot August Night, Neil Diamond's double platinum album, was recorded live at the Greek Theatre (Los Angeles).

== August 25, 1972 (Friday) ==
- Wal-Mart Stores, Inc. first began trading on the New York Stock Exchange. On its opening day, the price closed at $33 per share. Although the value of the stock dropped 77% in the first two years, an investment of $1,000 would have grown to $870,000 from 1972 to 2008
- Born:
  - Marvin Harrison, NFL receiver (Indianapolis Colts), in Philadelphia
  - Fazul Abdullah Mohammed, Comoros-born al-Qaeda plotter, in Moroni (d. June 8, 2011)

== August 26, 1972 (Saturday) ==
- The 1972 Summer Olympics opened in Munich, West Germany, with the parade starting at 3:00 local time, and were declared open at 4:25 in the afternoon. The games featured 8,005 athletes from 122 nations. Gunter Zahn lit the torch.
- In Alaska, Japanese mountaineer Naomi Uemura made the first solo ascent of Mount McKinley (which had first been climbed by Sourdough Expedition on April 3, 1910)
- Died: Sir Francis Chichester, British yachtsman who had become, in 1967 at the age of 65, the first person to sail around the world by himself.

== August 27, 1972 (Sunday) ==
- A dust storm in Kern County, California, led to two separate instances of multiple-vehicle collisions, killing seven people and injuring 96 others. Shortly after 5:00 pm, reduced visibility caused a pileup on U.S. Highway 99, killing three and injuring 16. Another chain reaction collision, on Interstate 5, injured 84 people, four of them fatally.
- At the "Western White House" in San Clemente, California, the President and Mrs. Nixon hosted 400 Hollywood celebrities, including Frank Sinatra, John Wayne, Zsa Zsa Gabor and Susan Hayward. Vice-President Agnew and Henry Kissinger, with his date Jill St. John, attended as well.
- Born: Rhun ap Iorwerth, Welsh politician, First Minister of Wales (2026-present), as Rhun ap Iorwerth Jones in Tonteg

== August 28, 1972 (Monday) ==
- Captain R. Stephen Ritchie became the first American ace fighter in the Vietnam War after downing his fifth enemy airplane in combat. Charles B. DeBellevue would down his fifth and sixth planes the following month. All five of Steve Ritchie's victories were of MiG-21 fighters. He would retire in 1994 as a brigadier general.
- Died:
  - Prince William of Gloucester, 30, cousin of Queen Elizabeth II, and fourth in line for the British throne until 1948, was killed when his airplane crashed during a race.
  - Harry Gold, 61, the American spy and chemist who was imprisoned from 1950 to 1965 after being convicted of espionage against the American nuclear program, died during a heart operation.

== August 29, 1972 (Tuesday) ==
- Pitcher Jim Barr of the San Francisco Giants retired his 39th, 40th and 41st consecutive batters in a game against the St. Louis Cardinals, breaking a record held since 1959 by Harvey Haddix. The last 21 batters in his last game (against Pittsburgh), and the first 20 of the Cardinals, were all kept from reaching first base. The record would stand for almost 37 years. Bobby Jenks tied the record in 2007, and on July 28, 2009, Mark Buehrle set a new mark of 45 straight.
- President Nixon announced that 12,000 more American soldiers would be withdrawn from Vietnam over a three-month period, with only 27,000 remaining by December 1. The withdrawal would represent a 95% drop since the peak of 543,400 in April 1969.
- Born: Amanda Marshall, Canadian singer-songwriter, in Toronto

== August 30, 1972 (Wednesday) ==
- The Brown Berets, a group to promote the rights of Hispanic-Americans, staged its most visible protest ever, as 26 men staged a peaceful occupation of California's Santa Catalina Island, which they claimed as being sovereign territory of Mexico. After arriving on the ferry in separate groups, the "Caravana de la Reconquista" changed into their military-style uniforms, and, shortly after 10:00 am, unfurled the Mexican flag over Avalon Bay. The group's leader, David Sanchez, said that the Channel Islands of California had never been ceded by Mexico to the United States, because the Treaty of Guadalupe Hidalgo referred only to "the division line between Upper and Lower California to the Pacific Ocean", and would not apply to the islands 27 miles offshore. The Berets eventually wore out their welcome, and were forced to leave by an American court order on September 22. The "Campo Tecolote" occupation was the last of the Brown Berets' publicity stunts, and the group disbanded the following year.
- Born:
  - Cameron Diaz, American film actress, in San Diego
  - Hani Hanjour, Saudi Arabian Al-Qaeda terrorist who piloted American Airlines Flight 77 into the Pentagon during the September 11 attacks, killing all 64 people on board and 125 in the building; in Ta'if (killed 2001)
  - Pavel Nedvěd, Czech footballer and 2003 Ballon d'Or winner for best European soccer player of the year; in Cheb, Czechoslovakia

== August 31, 1972 (Thursday) ==
- At the Olympics, American sprinters Eddie Hart, Rey Robinson and Robert Taylor were scheduled to run in the quarterfinals of the 100 meter dash, which their coach, Stan Wright, said would take place at 7:00 pm. Shortly before 4:15, the three men were watching a television feed to ABC Sports, and realized that the quarterfinal heats were taking place at that moment. Hart and Robinson arrived too late, and Taylor arrived in time to run his heat without preparation. Coach Wright took the blame for the mixup, which happened when he relied on a 1971 schedule.
- The Newark Evening News printed its final issue after 89 years. The paper had a circulation of 250,000 before a strike that lasted from May 1971 to April 1972.
- The last game of the chess "match of the century" between Bobby Fischer and Boris Spassky started. After the 40th move, the game would be adjourned. Fischer would win the next day, as Spassky did not even resume play.
