= September 1972 =

Month of 1972

<<	September 1972					>>
Su	Mo	Tu	We	Th	Fr	Sa
					1	2
3	4	5	6	7	8	9
10	11	12	13	14	15	16
17	18	19	20	21	22	23
24	25	26	27	28	29	30

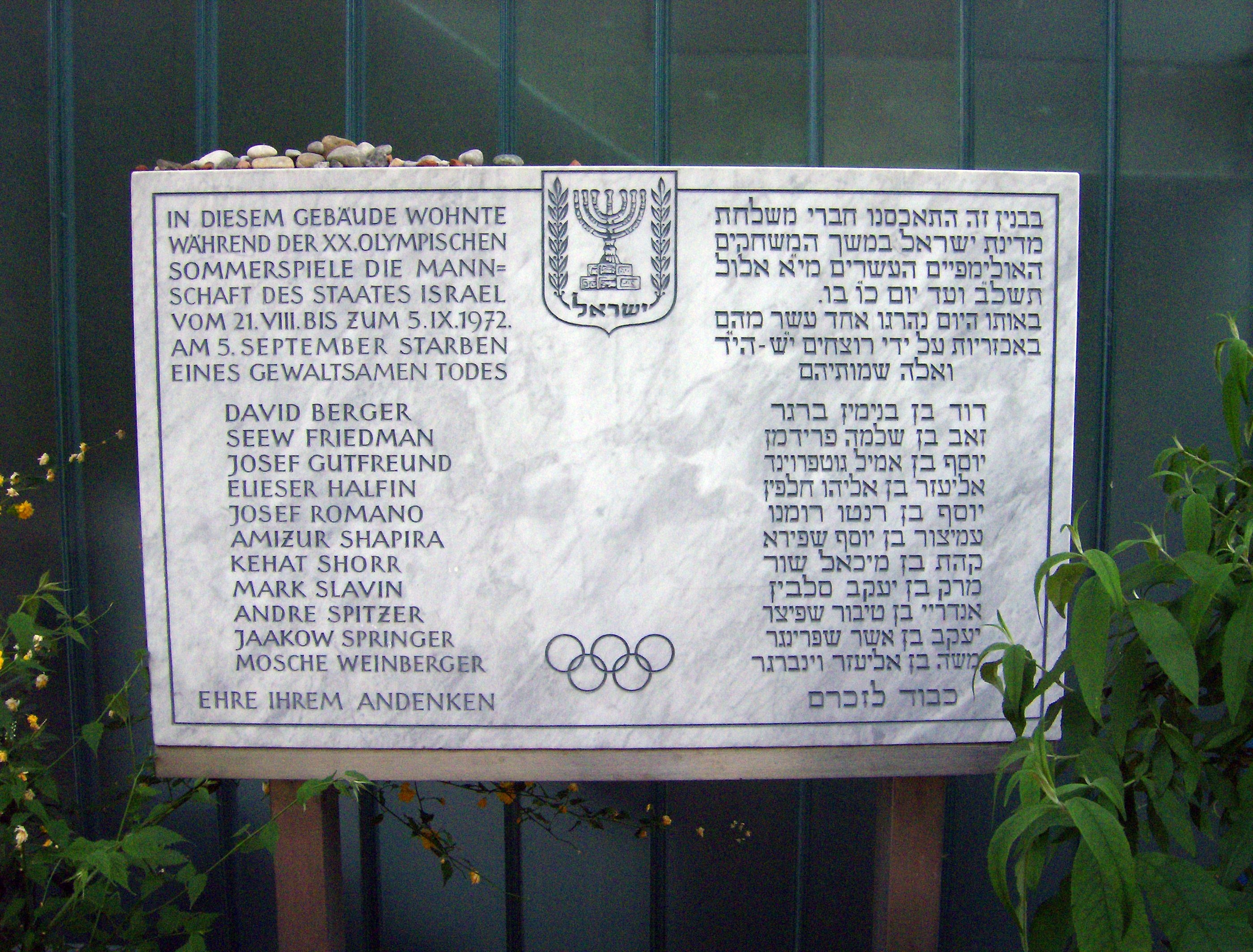
September 5–6, 1972: 11 members of Israeli Olympic team killed by terrorists at Munich

The following events occurred in September 1972:

== September 1, 1972 (Friday) ==
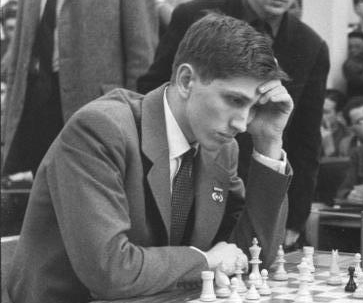
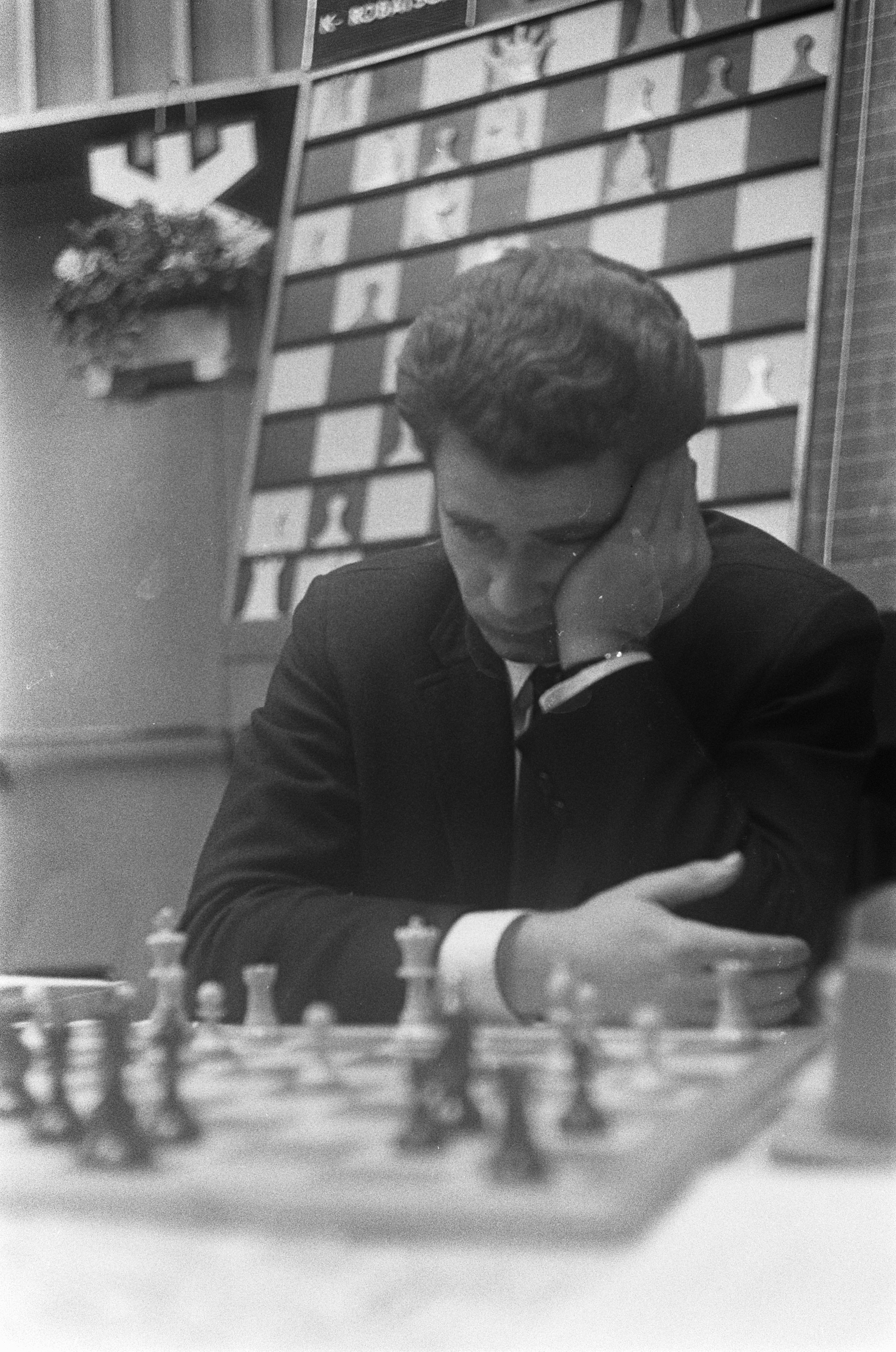
Bobby Fischer and Boris Spassky
- In the 21st game of chess for the World Chess Championship 1972, Bobby Fischer of the United States won the title, as defending champ Boris Spassky of the Soviet Union resigned. Under a system of one point for a win and 1/2 for a draw, the first to get 12 1/2 points would win the matches played at Reykjavík, Iceland. Fischer's prize money was $154,677.50.
- Raúl Sendic, leader of the Uruguayan guerilla group the Tupamaros, was captured after a shootout.
- The United States formally dropped all claims to the Swan Islands and recognized the sovereignty of Honduras over the disputed territory.
- A fire at the Blue Bird Café in Montreal killed 37 people. The blaze was set by three men who had been kicked out of the Wagon Wheel Bar earlier in the evening.
- Bye, Bye, Blackboard, the last Woody Woodpecker cartoon and last cartoon produced by Walter Lantz Productions, was released.

== September 2, 1972 (Saturday) ==
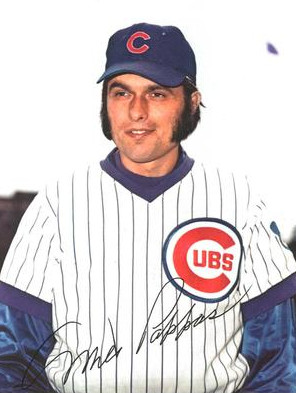
Milt Pappas

- Milt Pappas of the Chicago Cubs had retired 26 batters and was one player away from a perfect game. Larry Stahl of the San Diego Padres reached the plate and was one strike away (2–2), then one pitch away (3–2). The final pitch was close, but umpire Bruce Froemming called it "ball four" instead of "strike three", turning the 8–0 Cubs win into a mere no-hitter.
- The Soviet hockey team defeated Team Canada, 7–3, at the Montreal Forum, in the first game of the Summit Series between the two nations. Fans of the Canadian team, composed of National Hockey League stars who had confidently predicted that they would win all eight of the games scheduled against the Soviets, were stunned at the loss. The Canadian team had Ken Dryden and Tony Esposito as goaltenders, and included Phil Esposito and Bobby Clarke as forwards."
- The Confederation of Arab Republics was created between Egypt, Libya and Syria.
- Died: Reggie Harding, 30, former Detroit Pistons star, died the day after being shot in the head.

== September 3, 1972 (Sunday) ==
- The elections for the Khmer Republic's 126-member National Assembly took place. Because of a presidential decree designed to give President Lon Nol's Social Republican Party an advantage, the other parties withdrew from participating. The Socio-Republicans won all 126 seats on what was claimed to be a 78% turnout.
- Born: Patty Cake, popular resident of New York City's Central Park Zoo as the gorilla born in captivity in the city; in Manhattan, New York City (d. 2013)

== September 4, 1972 (Monday) ==
- Mark Spitz became the first competitor to win seven medals at a single Olympic Games, swimming as part of the American team in the 400 meter relay.

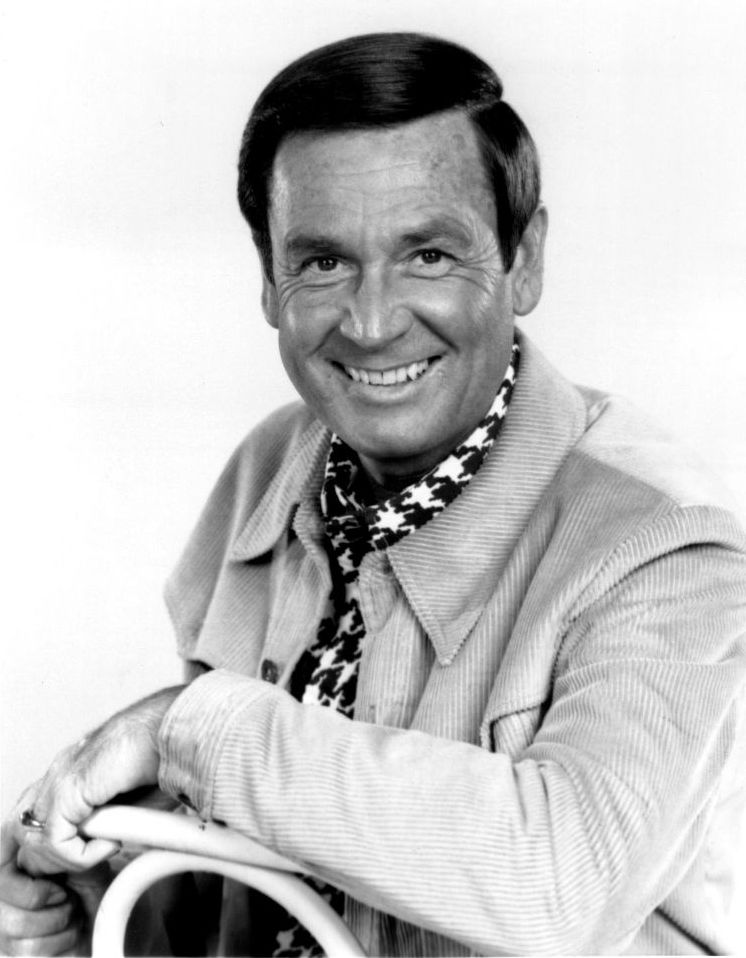
Bob Barker

- Bob Barker began a 35-year run as host of one of America's most popular game shows, as The New Price Is Right was shown for the first time on CBS. Barker would host the show (later simply The Price Is Right) until June 15, 2007.
- Armed robbers stole 18 paintings, including a Rembrandt, along with 38 pieces of jewelry and figurines from the Montreal Museum of Fine Arts, in the largest theft of private property in Canadian history. Except for one painting returned during abortive efforts to negotiate a ransom, none of the pieces of art work have ever been recovered, nor has anyone been charged.

== September 5, 1972 (Tuesday) ==
- What would end as the Munich massacre began as the 1972 Summer Olympics were in progress, eight members of the Palestinian terrorist group Black September broke into the Olympic Village in Munich, killed two members of Israel's Olympic team, and took nine others hostage. A rescue attempt the next day would end in disaster.
- Died:
  - Yossef Romano, 32, Israeli weightlifter
  - Moshe Weinberg, 33, Israeli wrestling coach

== September 6, 1972 (Wednesday) ==
- The Munich massacre took place following a bungled attempt by West Germany police to rescue kidnapped members of the Israeli Olympic team, held at Fürstenfeldbruck airport, Palestinian gunmen murdered all nine of their hostages. Five of the terrorists and one policeman died. The Olympic Games resumed after a brief interruption.
- In the U.S. Virgin Islands, eight employees and tourists were killed in a mass shooting at the Fountain Valley Golf Club course on the island of St. Croix. Five men would later be convicted of the crime.
- Born:
  - China Miéville, British fantasy novelist; in Norwich, Norfolk
  - Anika Noni Rose, American actress, 2004 Tony Award winner; in Bloomfield, Connecticut
- Died:
  - David Mark Berger, 28, Israeli weightlifter
  - Ze'ev Friedman, 28, Israeli weightlifter
  - Yossef Gutfreund, 30, Israeli wrestling referee
  - Eliezer Halfin, 24, Israeli wrestler
  - Amitzur Shapira, 30, Israeli athletics coach
  - Kehat Shorr, 53, Israeli shooting coach
  - Mark Slavin, 18, Israeli wrestler
  - Andre Spitzer, 27, Israeli fencing coach
  - Yakov Springer, 51, Israeli weightlifting judge
  - Luttif Afif, Palestinian terrorist who kidnapped Israeli athletes, along with four accomplices

== September 7, 1972 (Thursday) ==
- Prime Minister Indira Gandhi gave scientists at the Bhabha Atomic Research Centre the go-ahead to manufacture India's first nuclear bomb. India became the world's fifth nuclear power with the successful explosion of the bomb on May 18, 1974.
- The Soviet Union's Council of Ministers issued a directive to amend Section 74 of the Soviet Regulations on Communications, providing that "The use of telephonic communications ... for aims contrary to the interest of the State and to public order is forbidden." Under the regulation, telephone service was disconnected for dissidents without formally charging them with a crime.

== September 8, 1972 (Friday) ==
- In retaliation for the killing of nine Israeli Olympic athletes in the Munich massacre, Israel's air force bombed Palestinian strongholds in Syria and Lebanon.
- The British situation comedy Are You Being Served?, about employees of a department store, was first telecast, running until 1985.
- Born:
  - Os du Randt, South African rugby union forward; in Elliot, Eastern Cape
  - Patrick McGlynn, Scottish guitarist for the Bay City Rollers; in Edinburgh

== September 9, 1972 (Saturday) ==
- A link between Kentucky's Mammoth Cave and the adjacent Flint Ridge Cave System was discovered by explorers from the Cave Research Foundation, creating the longest cave passageway in the world, 144.4 miles (232.4 km) from one end to the other.
- At the 1972 Summer Olympics in Munich, the American men's basketball team, which had 64 victories and no defeats since the sport was added in 1936, lost to the Soviet Union, 51–50, on a shot at the buzzer by Alexander Belov. The U.S. team had been ahead, 50–49, when time first ran out, but Olympic officials added three seconds to the clock. The Soviets won the gold medal, and the Americans voted unanimously to refuse the silver medal.
- The three American television networks introduced their new cartoon schedules on the same morning. Among the new series being shown for the first time was Fat Albert and the Cosby Kids.
- Charles B. DeBellevue became the last American flying ace, registering a fifth and sixth shootdown, the most during the Vietnam War.
- Born: Natasha Kaplinsky, British news anchor; in Brighton, East Sussex

== September 10, 1972 (Sunday) ==
- Brazilian driver Emerson Fittipaldi won the Italian Grand Prix at Monza and became, at age 25, the youngest Formula One world champion.
- Frank Shorter of the United States won the marathon at the Olympic Games in Munich, finishing with a time of 2:12:19.8.
- The United States used its United Nations Security Council veto power for only the second time since the formation of the UN in 1945, killing a General Assembly resolution that demanded a halt to Israel's reprisals against Palestinian guerillas in Syria and Lebanon.
- Born:
  - Ghada Shouaa, Syrian heptathlete and Olympic gold medalist in 1996; in Mhardeh
  - Katsuya "Rio" Tahara, Japanese snowboarder; in Nagano

== September 11, 1972 (Monday) ==
- Bay Area Rapid Transit (BART) began operation on a 28-mile (45 km) run between Oakland and Fremont, and would later expand to connect San Francisco and other points in the area.
- At the request of White House aide John Ehrlichman, John Dean met with IRS Commissioner Johnnie Walters and gave him a list of 490 individuals to investigate. Walters consulted with Treasury Secretary Schultz the next day, who directed him to do nothing.
- Died: Max Fleischer, 89, American animator and founder of Fleischer Studios

== September 12, 1972 (Tuesday) ==
- Nearly four years after it was proposed by President Nixon, the federal revenue sharing plan, which would transfer $5.3 billion of U.S. government revenues to state and local governments, was approved by the Senate, 64–20. The measure had passed the House, 275–122, on June 22.
- The attack on two British fishing trawlers, by the Icelandic gunboat ICGV Aegir, triggered the second Cod War between the UK and Iceland.
- The television show Maude premiered on CBS-TV at 8:00 pm, opposite the premiere on ABC of Temperatures Rising.
- Born: Budi Putra, Indonesian journalist; in Payakumbuh, West Sumatra

== September 13, 1972 (Wednesday) ==
- Fifty-four North Korean members of its Red Cross delegation crossed the border at Panmunjom at 10:00 a.m. and were welcomed by their South Korean counterparts, in the first visit by North Korean officials since the end of the Korean War.
- More than 30 people, mostly schoolchildren, drowned when a ferry across the Kerian River (in Malaysia's Perak state) capsized. Some children were able to swim to safety, but most drowned in 40-foot-deep (12 m) waters.
- Air Mauritius, the national airline of Mauritania, made its first flight, five years after the company's founding, with a six-seat Piper PA-31 Navajo airplane that flew every Wednesday from Port Louis to Rodrigues and back again. Twenty-five years later, the Air Mauritius fleet would have four Airbus A340-300s, three Boeing 767s, two Boeing 747s, two ATR 42 turboprop carriers, and two Bell 206 helicopters.
- Born: Kelly Chen (Vivian Chen Wai Man), Hong Kong singer; in Hong Kong
- Died: Zoel Parenteau, American composer; in Englewood, New Jersey

== September 14, 1972 (Thursday) ==
- Pope Paul VI issued a motu proprio, rejecting calls to allow women to have any formal ministerial role in the Roman Catholic Church. "In accordance with the venerable tradition of the Church," the Pope proclaimed, "installation in the ministries of lector and acolyte is reserved to men".
- More than 33 years after the outbreak of World War II, West Germany and Poland restored diplomatic relations. East Germany had been an ally of Poland since that nation's establishment in 1949.
- The People's Republic of China made its first commitment ever to purchasing food from the U.S., as U.S. Secretary of Agriculture Earl Butz announced that China had placed an order to buy 15 million bushels of U.S. wheat.

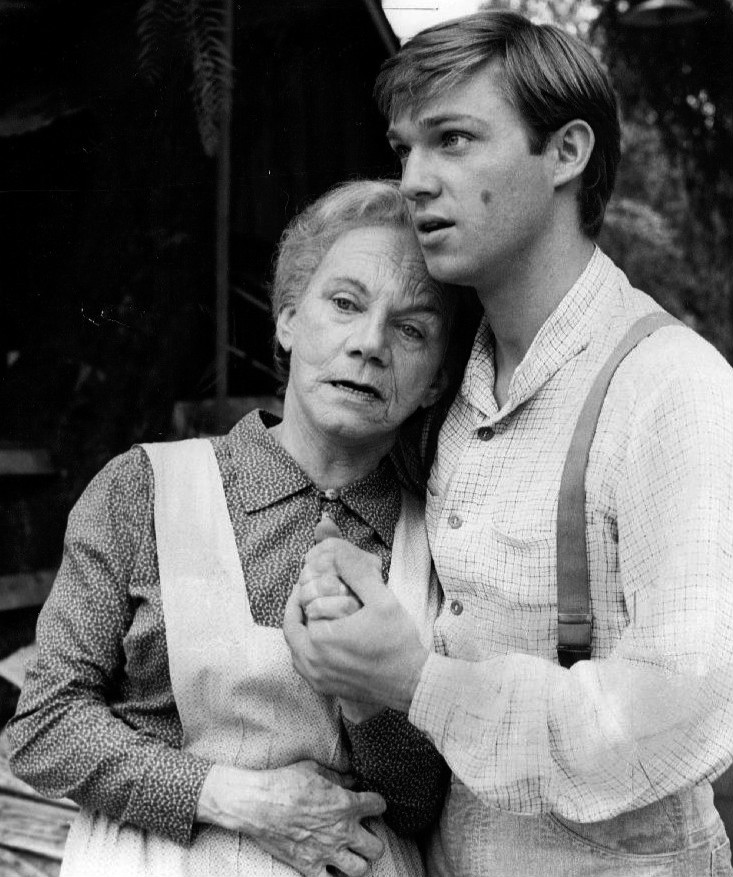
Grandma Walton and John-Boy

- The Waltons, based on producer Earl Hamner's reminiscences of his rural childhood, began a ten-season run on CBS. The setting was the fictional "Jefferson County, Virginia" in the 1930s.
- That Championship Season, written by Jason Miller, made its Broadway debut at the Booth Theatre for the first of exactly 700 performances. It would run until April 21, 1972, and win the 1973 Tony Award for Best Play.
- Born: Notah Begay III, American Indian golfer; in Albuquerque

== September 15, 1972 (Friday) ==
- A federal grand jury indicted the five Watergate burglars, along with E. Howard Hunt and G. Gordon Liddy. On the same day, White House staff attorney John Dean met with President Nixon for the first time concerning the scandal. In the meeting, which lasted from 5:27 to 6:17, they discussed the covering up of the White House role in the Watergate break-in. Dean would testify about his memory of the discussion at the Watergate hearings on June 25, 1973, unaware that Oval Office conversations were all recorded at Nixon's request. Nixon, Chief of Staff H.R. Haldeman, and Dean, discussed plans to take revenge on the President's enemies. "They are asking for it and they are going to get it," commented Nixon, adding "We haven't used the Bureau and we haven't used the Justice Department, but things are going to change now. They're going to get it right."
- South Vietnam's army regained control of the city of Quảng Trị, more than three months after the provincial capital had been captured by North Vietnamese forces.
- SAS Flight 130 was hijacked over Sweden by three members of the Croatian National Resistance terrorist group, after taking off from Gothenburg to Stockholm. The four crew and the other 83 passengers were held hostage as the DC-9 jet was diverted to Malmö. As a condition of release of the hostages, seven Croatian terrorists imprisoned in Sweden were set free and allowed to leave the country.
- Born: Jimmy Carr, British comedian; in Hounslow, London
- Died: Geoffrey Fisher, 85, Archbishop of Canterbury from 1945 to 1961

== September 16, 1972 (Saturday) ==
- At least 103 people were killed in the collapse of the Colgante Bridge, during the festival for Our Lady of Peñafrancia, near Naga City in the Philippines. At 4:30 in the afternoon, the wooden bridge fell apart under the weight of spectators, plunging people and debris into the Bicol River.
- "Deep Throat" (later revealed to be FBI Associate Director W. Mark Felt) listened over the telephone to reporter Bob Woodward's draft of a story on Watergate and confirmed an anonymous tip that money from Maurice Stans had been used to finance the Watergate break-in.
- The Bob Newhart Show began a successful seven-season run on CBS, giving the master of the telephone monologue a situation comedy role as Chicago psychologist Dr. Robert Hartley. A variety show of the same name had appeared on NBC from 1961 to 1962.

== September 17, 1972 (Sunday) ==
- In the first release of prisoners of war since 1969, North Vietnam released three American POWs. Navy Lieutenants Norris Charles and Markham Gartley and Air Force Major Edward Elias were provided civilian clothes and then allowed to stay in Hanoi with an American welcoming team. Another 539 American POWs remained in captivity, and more than 1,000 Americans listed as missing in action were unaccounted for.
- 1,000 soldiers of the "Uganda People's Militia" invaded Uganda from Tanzania. The Ugandan Army would repel the invasion after two weeks of fighting.

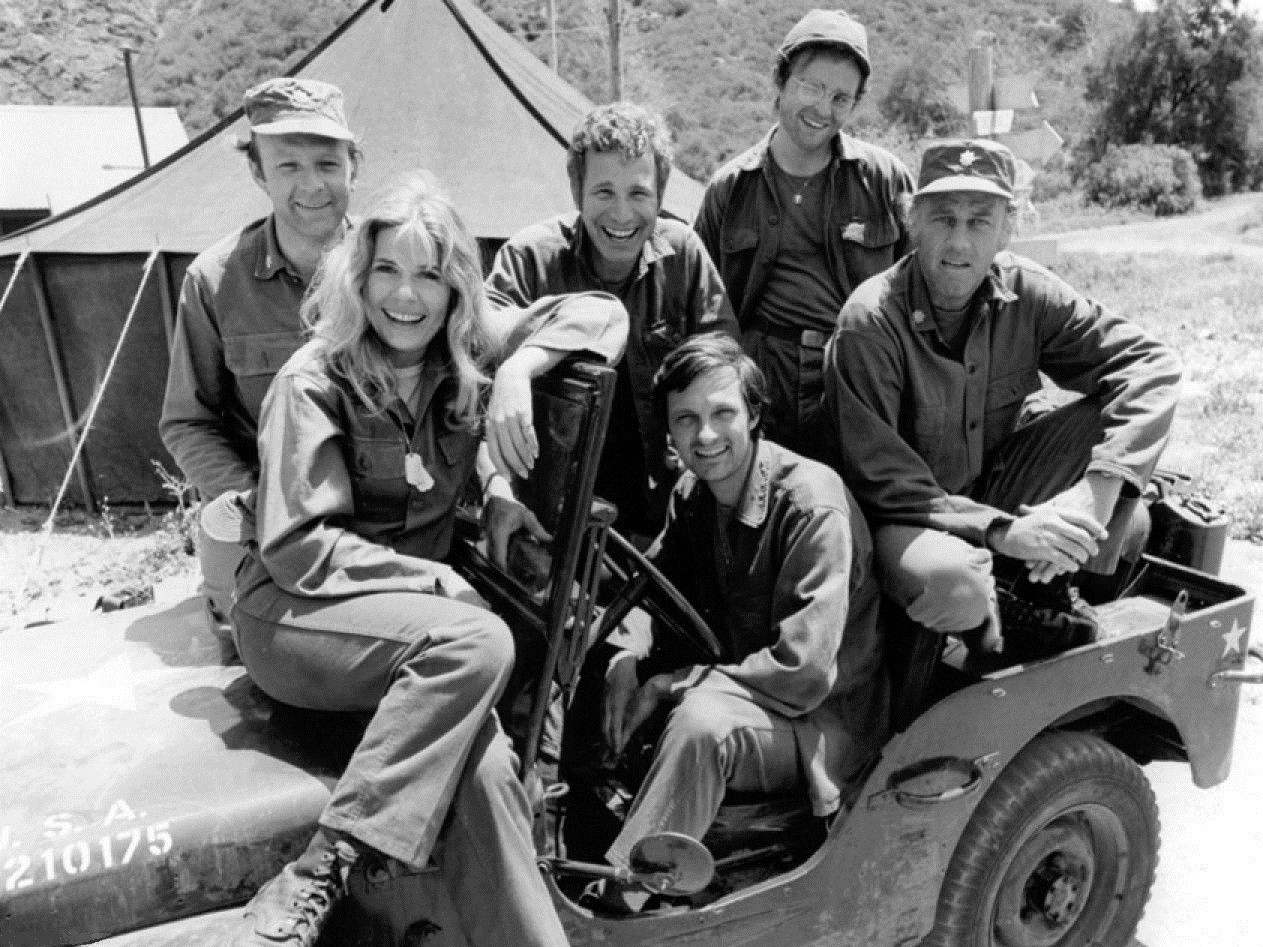
The original cast of M*A*S*H

- The popular television series M*A*S*H began an eleven-season run, eight years longer than the Korean War which provided its setting.

== September 18, 1972 (Monday) ==
- Former Japanese Foreign Minister Zentaro Kosaka publicly apologized, on behalf of Japan, at a banquet in Beijing for Japan's atrocities against China prior to and during World War II.

== September 19, 1972 (Tuesday) ==
- A parcel bomb sent to the Israeli Embassy in London killed Ami Schachori, the agricultural attaché, who was scheduled to return home after four years abroad. Another bomb arrived at the Israeli Embassy in Paris later in the day, but was disarmed. Both packages had been sent from Amsterdam. Other packages were delivered the next day in New York and Montreal, and defused.
- The Oakland A's began a game in which they would use 30 players in a 15-inning game against the Chicago White Sox, setting a Major League Baseball record that still stands. The game also broke a major league record for most players used by both teams (51) in a game. The White Sox, at second place in the American League West division, beat the first place A's, 8 to 7 when the game ended at 12:59 the next morning after 4 hours and 41 minutes of play.
- Born Ashot Nadanian, Armenian chess player; in Baku, Armenian SSR, Soviet Union
- Died Robert Casadesus, 73, French pianist

== September 20, 1972 (Wednesday) ==
- Britain's ratification of the Treaty of Accession to the Common Market was completed.
- Floyd Patterson's comeback attempt came to an end with a bout against Muhammad Ali. Patterson, the world heavyweight boxing champion from 1956 to 1959, and 1961 to 1962, had been attempting to regain his crown since 1970. The fight was stopped in the seventh round after Ali opened a cut over Patterson's eye.
- New men's world records were set in Belgium by Belgian athletes, at a meet a track and field athletics meet in Brussels the 5,000 metres (13 minutes, 13 seconds by Emiel Puttemans and for the 20,000 metre race (57 minutes, 44.4 seconds) by Gaston Roelants. On the same day, at nearby Leuven, Roelants set the world record for the longest distance run in a one hour run.(20,784 metres (68,189 ft) by Gaston Roelants). Puttemans had set the new world for the 3000 metre race (7 minutes, 37.6 seconds) six days earlier, on September 14, in Aarhus in Denmark.
- Died: Richard Oakes, 30, Mohawk American Indian activist who led the Occupation of Alcatraz from 1969 to 1971, was shot and killed during an argument with Michael Morgan, the caretaker of a YMCA camp in Annapolis, California. The homicide took place six days after a confrontation between Oakes and Morgan on use of the property.

== September 21, 1972 (Thursday) ==
- Ferdinand Marcos, the President of the Philippines, signed Proclamation No. 1081, to authorize a declaration of martial law across the entire nation . The immediate pretext was the attempted assassination of Defense Secretary Juan Ponce Enrile the day prior; however, Marcos stated that the proclamation had been signed on September 21, two days before the announcement. Enrile's driver was killed during the staged attack. Marcos announced the new law in a nationally televised address two days later, on September 23.
- Born:
  - Liam Gallagher, British singer for the band Oasis; in Manchester
  - Jon Kitna, American quarterback; in Tacoma, Washington
- Died:
  - Ben Kiwanuka, 50, Chief Justice of Uganda (who had been the African nation's first Prime Minister), was arrested in his courtroom by Ugandan soldiers on orders of President Idi Amin, then brutally tortured to death.
  - Henry de Montherlant, 76, French writer, committed suicide

== September 22, 1972 (Friday) ==
- West German Chancellor Willy Brandt called for a vote of confidence in his government, one he expected to lose, as a pretext for new parliamentary elections.
- Hexachlorophene, an anti-bacterial compound that had been a popular additive in skin cleansers, cosmetics, deodorants, toothpastes and baby powder, was banned by the Food and Drug Administration except for prescription use. FDA studies had concluded that HCP caused brain damage in infants. The FDA ordered immediate removal of baby powder with more than 0.75% HCP, and directed that cleansers with 3% concentration could be sold only by prescription.
- An assassination attempt was staged against Philippine Defense Minister Juan Ponce Enrile while he was traveling in Manila. While nobody actually saw the attack, witnesses heard gunshots and then saw Enrile's limousine riddled with bullets. In the government announcement that followed, the account was given that Enrile had been riding in a different car, but the attempt was used to justify implementing Proclamation 1081, an authorization that happened to have been signed earlier by President Marcos the day before. Enrile would admit in 1988, after the fall of the Marcos regime, that the event had been a hoax to justify the announcement the next day of martial law.

== September 23, 1972 (Saturday) ==
- A fire killed 31 people at the Oscar restaurant on the Greek island of Rhodes, after a short circuit set fire to bamboo paneling. Most of the dead were Scandinavian tourists.
- At an annual meeting of the International Monetary Fund, U.S. Treasury Secretary George P. Schultz unveiled a proposal for "SDRs"—Special Drawing Rights—to replace gold reserves as the asset to which the world currencies would be tied.
- Julius Erving, remembered for playing for the Philadelphia 76ers, the New York Nets and even the Virginia Squires, played his first professional basketball game, appearing as an NBA draftee for the Atlanta Hawks, for whom he played in an exhibition against the ABA's Kentucky Colonels, in a 112–99 win in Frankfort, Kentucky. Erving would play another exhibition for the NBA Hawks before returning to the ABA.
- "Moo-la the Cow" was unveiled in Stephenville, Texas, honoring the local dairy industry.
- A 15-year-old boy in Waldport, Oregon, was killed, and two other people injured, after being struck by lightning. Although he was carrying a box containing 135 sticks of dynamite, the box did not explode, contrary to some repetitions of the story.
- Born: Karl Pilkington, British TV and radio personality; in Manchester

== September 24, 1972 (Sunday) ==
- Twelve children and 11 adults were killed when an F-86 fighter aircraft crashed into a Farrell's Ice Cream Parlour in Sacramento. The store, located across a highway from the edge of an airport runway, had at least 100 people inside at the time.
- Japan's Prime Minister Kakuei Tanaka arrived in Beijing, where he was welcomed by China's Premier, Zhou Enlai.

== September 25, 1972 (Monday) ==
- Voters in Norway decided whether to approve Norway's entry into the European Economic Community (the "Common Market"), voters rejected the Treaty of Accession. The final vote was 1,118,281 "Nei" and 971,687 "Ja". On November 28, 1994, voters would reject a second proposal to join the European Community. Prime Minister Trygve Bratteli, whose Norske arbeiderpartei (Norwegian Labour Party) had been divided over the issue of Common Market membership, resigned the next day.
- Died: Alejandra Pizarnik, 36, Argentine poet, killed herself with an overdose of the barbiturate Seconal

== September 26, 1972 (Tuesday) ==
- North Vietnamese negotiator Le Duc Tho dropped demands that South Vietnam's President Nguyen Van Thieu be removed from office as a condition for ending the Vietnam War, a breakthrough in peace negotiations.
- Rebel forces crossed from North Yemen to attack South Yemen.
- Following a 342–34 approval by the House of Representatives, President Nixon signed into law the bill creating the WIC Program (Special Supplemental Nutrition Program for Women, Infants and Children).
- U.S. Patent No. 3,693,535 was granted for the first automatic drip coffee brewing machine for homes, marketed under the name "Mr. Coffee". The machine went on sale as early as October 8 with the suggested retail price of US$49.95, roughly $292 in 2017 dollars.
- The first exhibition game for the new World Hockey Association took place in Quebec City, between two of the four teams that would eventually be admitted to the National Hockey League. The New England Whalers beat the Quebec Nordiques, 4–1.
- Time Inc. introduced its new monthly personal finance magazine, Money, on newsstands, with the first issue being dated for October 1972.
- Born: Beto O'Rourke (Robert Francis O'Rourke), United States Congressman for the 16th district in Texas (2013–2018) and presidential candidate; in El Paso

== September 27, 1972 (Wednesday) ==
- Canada banned the sale and use of firecrackers.
- In Fort Lauderdale, Susan Place, 17, and Georgia Jessup, 16, went with their friend, "Jerry Shepard", on a trip "to the beach to play the guitar". Their remains would be found seven months later as they became the first known victims of serial killer Gerard Schaefer. Schaefer had been dismissed from the office of the Martin County, Florida Sheriff's Department earlier in the year, and was awaiting trial after a failed kidnapping, on July 22, of two other teenage girls.
- Born: Gwyneth Paltrow, American actress, 1998 Oscar winner for Best Actress (Shakespeare in Love); in Los Angeles
- Died:
  - Bernardo Alvarado Monzón, 46, Guatemalan Communist and General Secretary of the Partido Guatemalteco del Trabajo (PGT), was executed by the Guatemalan Army the day after being captured in a raid on the PGT headquarters, along with seven other PGT officials and members. By order of the Guatemalan president, Carlos Arana Osorio, the bodies of the eight victims were dumped into the ocean.
  - S. R. Ranganathan, 81, pioneering Indian librarian
  - Rory Storm, 33, British musician, died of a combination of alcohol and sleeping pills

== September 28, 1972 (Thursday) ==
- With Paul Henderson scoring the winning goal past goalie Vladislav Tretiak, the Canadian national men's hockey team defeated the Soviet national ice hockey team in Game 8 of the 1972 Summit Series (La Série du Siècle), 6–5, to win the series 4–3–1.
- After 66 years, the United States Secretary of the Army cleared the records of the black soldiers involved in the Brownsville Affair. The 167 members of the 25th United States Regiment had been dishonorably discharged after being accused of complicity in the shooting of two white men in Brownsville, Texas. Following the publication of John D. Weaver's book The Brownsville Raid, in 1970, the U.S. Army reopened the investigation of the incident and concluded that the men had been innocent.

== September 29, 1972 (Friday) ==
- Vasil Mzhavanadze, the First Secretary of the Communist Party of the Georgian SSR, and Soviet Georgia's de facto leader, was removed from his job by the Soviet Communist Party's Central Committee. Mzhavadnadze retained his post as a full member of the Politburo, but was replaced as the Georgian leader by Eduard Shevardnadze.
- Under a Joint Communiqué of the Government of Japan and the Government of the People's Republic of China, Japan, normalized diplomatic relations with the People's Republic of China after breaking official ties with the Republic of China (Taiwan). On August 12, 1978, the two nations would formally end their state of war with a peace treaty.
- In a story headlined "Mitchell Controlled Secret GOP Fund", Washington Post investigative reporters Carl Bernstein and Bob Woodward broke the story that "while serving as U.S. Attorney General, Mitchell personally controlled a secret Republican fund that was used to gather information about the Democrats, according to sources involved in the Watergate investigation."
- The eight member nations of the European Space Research Organization (ESRO) officially adopted the METEOSAT programme, providing for European launched meteorological satellites.

== September 30, 1972 (Saturday) ==
- Malaysia-Singapore Airlines ceased operation, then split into Malaysia Airline System (now Malaysia Airlines) and Singapore Airlines on the following day.
- Roberto Clemente made his 3,000th hit, which would also prove to be his very last. Clemente would be killed in a plane crash at the end of the year.
- Dr. Irving Selikoff of the Mount Sinai School of Medicine addressed the annual National Cancer Conference in Los Angeles, and announced the increase in cases of mesothelioma among men who had been exposed to asbestos 30 years earlier during World War II.
- Born: Shaan (stage name for Shantanu Mukherjee), Indian singer; in Khandwa, Madhya Pradesh
