= OLMo (language model) =

OLMo, short for Open Language Model, is a family of large language models developed by the Allen Institute for AI (Ai2). The first models, OLMo 7B, were released in February 2024. Alongside the model weights, Ai2 made available the training data, training and evaluation code, logs, metrics, and intermediate checkpoints used during development.

The project was designed to make the development of language models more reproducible and open to scientific study. Its initial technical report contrasted OLMo with releases that provide model weights or inference software but do not disclose training data or development details. The report stated that access to these artifacts could support research into model behavior, biases, and risks.

== Openness and reproducibility ==
OLMo is described by Ai2 as fully open because its releases extend beyond model weights. The project has published training data, preprocessing tools, code, training recipes, evaluation tools, and intermediate checkpoints.

The distinction between open-weight models and models with transparent development processes has been an important issue in discussions of open-source artificial intelligence. In its coverage of OLMo 2, TechCrunch noted that the model family met the Open Source Initiative's definition of open-source AI because the data and tools used to develop it were publicly available.

== Licensing and availability ==
OLMo model releases have been distributed through platforms including Hugging Face and GitHub. TechCrunch reported that the OLMo 2 models and their components were released under the Apache License 2.0, which permits commercial use subject to the license terms.
