= Antonio Olmo (cyclist) =

Spanish bicycle racer

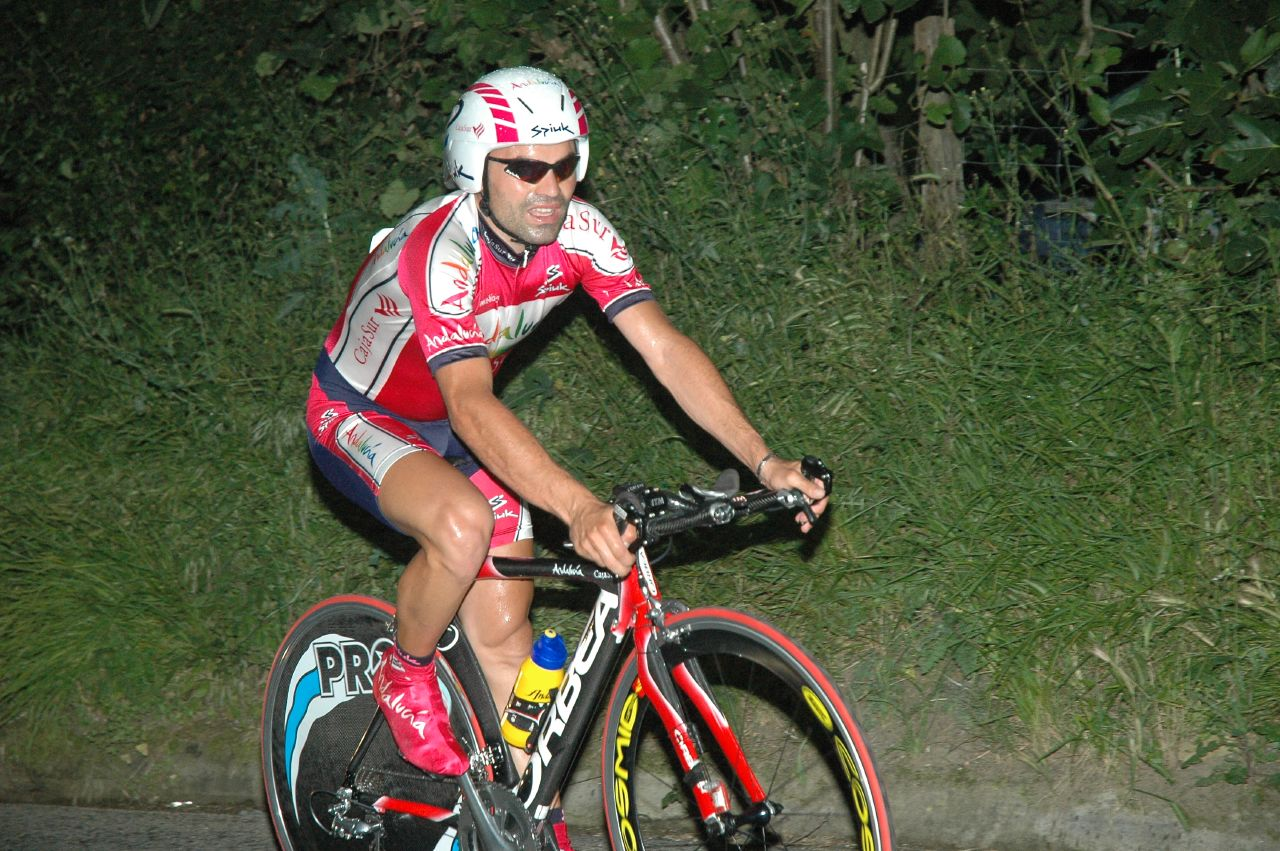

Personal information
- Full name: Antonio Olmo Menacho
- Born: 1 August 1982 (age 44) El Cuervo, Spain

Cycling career
- Sport: Cycling
- Current team: Retired
- Discipline: Road
- Role: Rider

Amateur teams
- 2001: Ávila Rojas
- 2002–2003: Kelme–Costa Blanca amateur
- 2008: Fuerteventura–Canarias
- 2010: Extremadura–Spiuk

Professional teams
- 2004–2006: Comunidad Valenciana–Kelme
- 2007: Andalucía–Cajasur
- 2009: Boyaca es Para Vivirla
- 2011–2013: CC Loulé–Louletano–Aquashow

Antonio Olmo Menacho (born 19 August 1982 in El Cuervo) is a Spanish former cyclist.

== Major results ==
2008
2nd Overall Cinturó de l'Empordà
8th Overall Vuelta Ciclista a León
2009
7th Vuelta Ciclista a La Rioja
