= El Cuervo de Sevilla =

- Flag Coat of arms

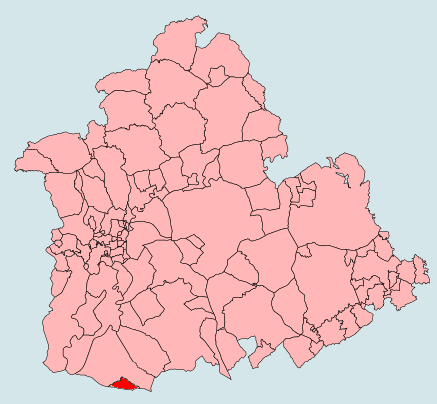
- Location of El Cuervo de Sevilla in the province of Seville.

- Location in Andalusia
- Coordinates: 36°51′4″N 6°2′30″W
- Country: Spain
- A. community: Andalusia
- Province: Seville
- Municipality: El Cuervo de Sevilla

Government
  - Alcalde: Francisco Cordero Ramírez (IULV-CA)

Area
  - Total: 31 km^{2} (12 sq mi)
- Elevation: 63 m (207 ft)

Population (2025-01-01)
  - Total: 8,783
  - Density: 280/km^{2} (730/sq mi)
- Time zone: UTC+1 (CET)
  - Summer (DST): UTC+2 (CEST)

El Cuervo de Sevilla is a Spanish municipality located in the province of Seville, in Andalusia. It has a population of 8,628 (in 2018) and an area of 31 km². It's 72 km from the provincial capital, Seville. El Cuervo de Sevilla means "The Crow of Seville" in Spanish. That is why the flag and seal both have a crow on it.

== See also ==
- List of municipalities in Seville
