= Centre-left (disambiguation) =

Centre-left politics refers to a wide range of political ideologies that are situated between the centre and the left of the left-right political spectrum. Centre-left may also refer to:

- The Centre-left coalition, a coalition of social democratic, liberal, centrist, and eco-socialist political parties in Italy,
- The Centre Left Alliance, a coalition of two social democratic parties in Romania: the more conservative PSD and the more progressive UNPR,
- The Centre-Left Grassroots Alliance, a faction of the British Labour Party supporting greater devolution of powers to Constituency Labour Parties,
- The Centre-Left of Albacete, an electoral alliance in the Spanish province of Albacete consisting of the PSP, ADA, and EDCEE,
- The Organic centre-left, a coalition of christian democratic, democratic socialist, social democratic, and social liberal political parties in Italy, one of the predecessors of the modern Centre-left coalition.

== See also ==
- Left of center (disambiguation)
- New Democracy (disambiguation)
