= November 1972 =

Month of 1972

<<	November 1972					>>
Su	Mo	Tu	We	Th	Fr	Sa
			1	2	3	4
5	6	7	8	9	10	11
12	13	14	15	16	17	18
19	20	21	22	23	24	25
26	27	28	29	30

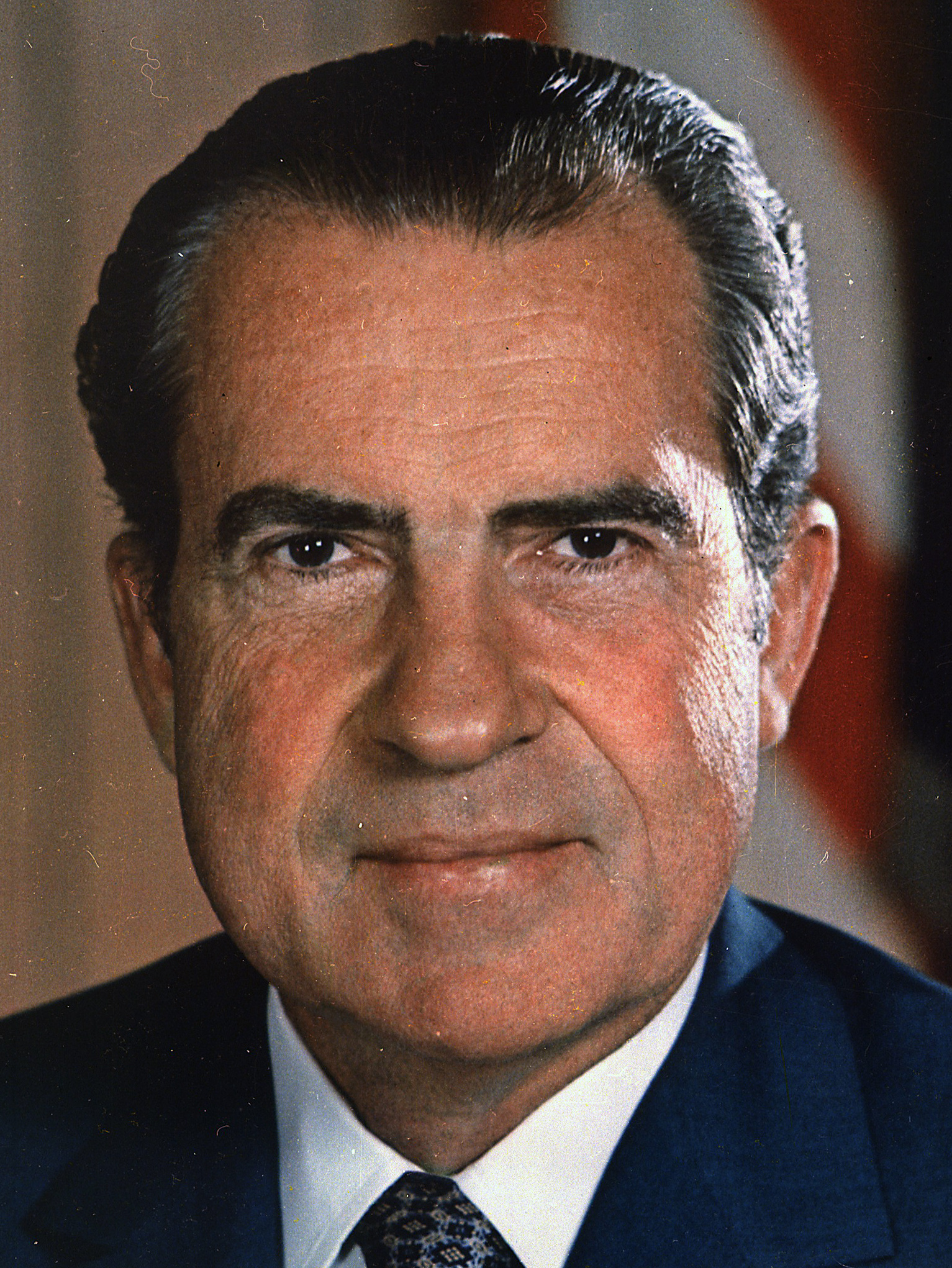
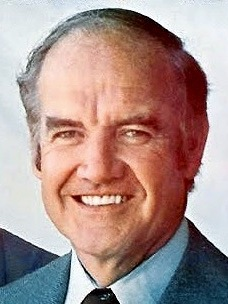
November 7, 1972: Republican Nixon, Democrat McGovern
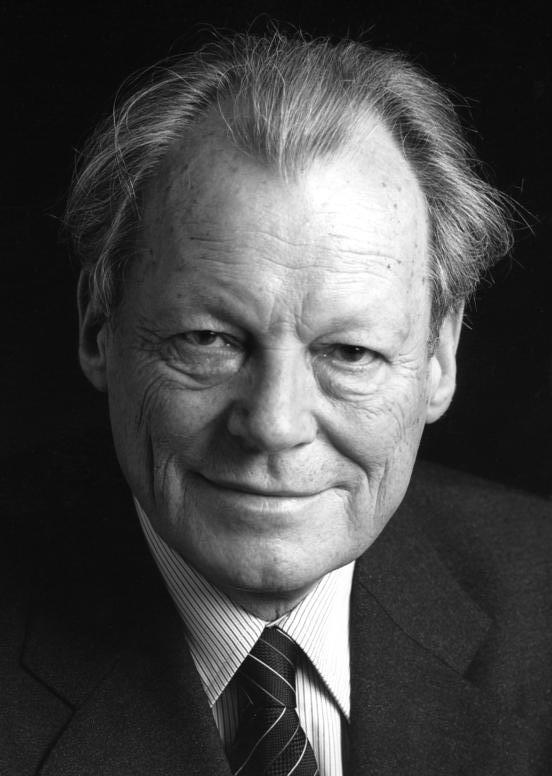
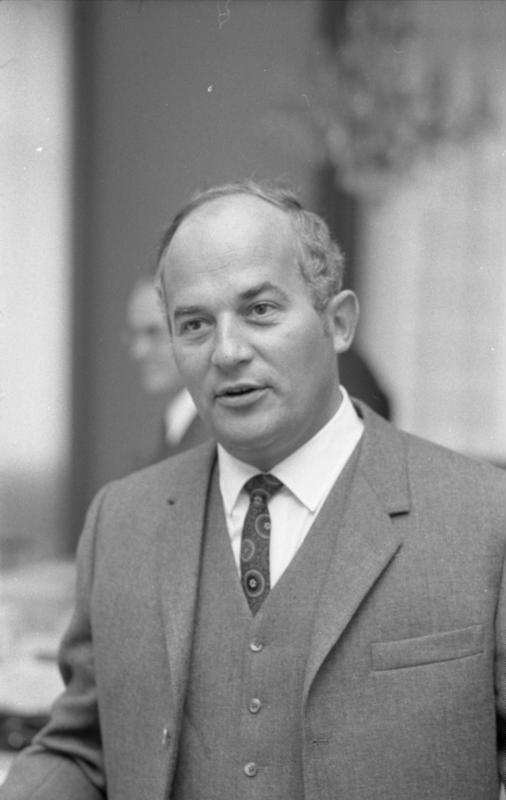
November 19, 1972: Chancellor Brandt's SPD wins West German election over Barzel's CDU/CSU

The following events occurred in November 1972:

== November 1, 1972 (Wednesday) ==
- The groundbreaking, made-for-television film That Certain Summer appeared as the ABC Wednesday Night Movie. Actors Hal Holbrook and Martin Sheen addressed a controversial topic, portraying an adult gay couple in the Golden Globe winning movie.
- Born: Toni Collette, Australian actress, in Blacktown, NSW
- Died: Ezra Pound, 87, American poet, in Venice

== November 2, 1972 (Thursday) ==
- Pierre Trudeau announced that he would not step down as Prime Minister of Canada despite what appeared to be a 109–109 tie between his Liberal Party and Robert Stanfield's Progressive Conservatives. David Lewis of the New Democrats announced that the 30 NDP members would form a coalition with the Liberals to give Trudeau a majority (139 of 264 members) in Canada's House of Commons.
- Five members of the American Indian Movement took over the office of the Bureau of Indian Affairs in Washington and held it for seven days.
- Died: Grigoriy Plaskov, 73, Soviet Jewish artillery Lieutenant General; in Moscow

== November 3, 1972 (Friday) ==
- A group of 132 sailors on board the USS Constellation, mostly African-American, began what has been described as "the first mass mutiny in the history of the U.S. Navy". The men refused to leave the mess deck in protest over announcements, the day before, that 250 black sailors would be discharged, six of them less than honorably, and demanded to meet with ship Captain J.D. Ward. The next day, the men disobeyed a direct order to report to the flight deck, and on November 9, the men refused orders to return to the ship while in San Diego. None of the sailors were ever arrested. Some were discharged early, and most were reassigned to shore duty.

== November 4, 1972 (Saturday) ==
- The CIA spy ship Glomar Explorer was launched on its first voyage. Although the 170-member crew was ostensibly conducting mining exploration on the ocean floor, the ship's true mission was to attempt recovery of the contents of a Soviet submarine that had sunk on April 11, 1968.
- Gusty Spence, leader of the Ulster Volunteer Force, was recaptured by British authorities four months after his escape on furlough from a prison in Northern Ireland. Between his rearrest and his release in 1984, Spence renounced violence and worked towards reconciling Catholics and Protestants in Ireland.
- Born: Luís Figo, Portuguese footballer with 127 appearances for Portugal's national team, in Almada
- Died: Yuri Galanskov, 33, Soviet dissident poet, in a labor camp

== November 5, 1972 (Sunday) ==
- Organic farming entered a new era when the International Federation of Organic Agriculture Movements (IFOAM) was founded in Versailles, France, by five organizations from France, Great Britain, Sweden, South Africa and the United States.
- Died: Reginald Owen, 85, British actor

== November 6, 1972 (Monday) ==
- A fire broke out in the dining car of an express train in Japan while it was traveling through an eight-mile-long tunnel near Fukui. The smoke killed 29 people and injured another 678.
- The first intercollegiate game of ultimate frisbee was played between Rutgers University and Princeton University in New Brunswick, New Jersey, on the site of the first intercollegiate football game (and the 103rd anniversary of that game) which had matched Princeton and Rutgers. Rutgers won, 29–27.
- The comic strip Frank and Ernest, by Bob Thaves, made its debut. In the first strip, Frank's punchline was "Maybe the battery's getting weak, Ernie", and the sight gag was a curved flashlight beam.
- Born:
  - Thandiwe Newton, British actress, in London
  - Rebecca Romijn, American model and actress, in Berkeley, California
- Died: Edward V. Long, 64, U.S. Senator for Missouri, 64. Long's personal secretary would later tell prosecutors in Clarksville, Missouri, that Long had told her that he believed that he had been poisoned by candy which had been sent to him in the mail, although no box of candy was found and no charges were ever filed arising from Long's death. An autopsy would determine later that no traces of poison had been found, and concluded Long had died of natural causes.

== November 7, 1972 (Tuesday) ==
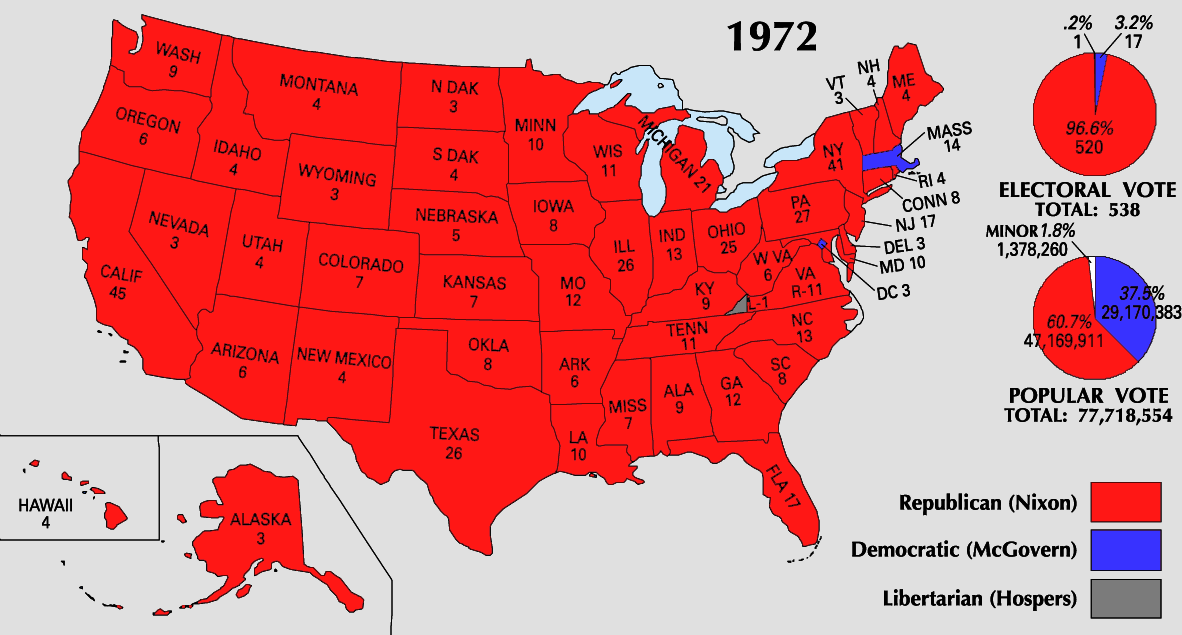
Nixon won 49 of the 50 U.S. states

- In the 1972 United States presidential election, Richard M. Nixon won re-election by a landslide over Democrat George S. McGovern, winning the electoral votes of all states except for Massachusetts and Washington, D.C. Nixon had 47,168,710 votes to McGovern's 29,173,222 and 520 of the 537 possible electoral votes.
- Ten people were killed in the collapse of the Sidney Lanier Bridge in the U.S. state of Georgia after the U.S. cargo ship African Neptune collided with the structure, causing vehicles and their occupants to fall into the Brunswick River. Another 11 people were rescued survived
- Born: Danny Grewcock, English national rugby union team lock; in Coventry, Warwickshire

== November 8, 1972 (Wednesday) ==
- HBO (Home Box Office), the first "pay cable" television channel, was launched in the United States at 7:30 pm ET. The first evening of programming was a National Hockey League (NHL) game between the New York Rangers and the Vancouver Canucks from Madison Square Garden (part of a long-term agreement to broadcast sports events based at the Manhattan arena), followed by the film Sometimes a Great Notion, and was broadcast to 365 subscribers in Wilkes-Barre, Pennsylvania. Each household paid an additional $6.00 per month to Service Electric Cable TV for the service.
- On the day after his re-election as President of the United States, Richard Nixon announced that he had asked for the resignations of his cabinet and everyone he had appointed to office, with plans for "restructuring and reorganizing" the entire Executive Branch.

== November 9, 1972 (Thursday) ==
- Canada's first geostationary communications satellite, Anik-1 was launched from Florida. The project was a joint venture by Telesat Canada and the Hughes Aircraft Company.
- In the Mozambican War of Independence, FRELIMO launched a major offensive against the Portuguese army.
- Born:
  - Eric Dane, American actor, in San Francisco
  - Corin Tucker, American singer-songwriter and guitarist (Sleater-Kinney, in Eugene, Oregon

== November 10, 1972 (Friday) ==
- Southern Airways Flight 49 from Birmingham, Alabama, to Montgomery was seized by three hijackers at 7:22 p.m. local time, and flown from one airport to the next, going to Jackson, Mississippi, for refueling, then to Detroit, where the McDonnell Douglas DC-9 circled while the three men negotiated their demands, including a $10,000,000 ransom. At one point the hijackers threatened to crash the airplane into the nuclear installation at the Oak Ridge National Laboratory. After two days, the DC-9 landed in Havana, Cuba, where the hijackers were jailed by Fidel Castro.
- Admiral Elmo Zumwalt, the U.S. Chief of Naval Operations, assembled the highest-ranking admirals of the United States Navy in Washington, and told them, "The Navy has made unacceptable progress in the equal opportunity area. The reason for this failure was not the programs, but the fact that they were not being used". Beginning on November 14, the U.S. Navy accelerated programs to combat racism within the service. President Richard Nixon was unhappy with Zumwalt's handling of the recent African American revolt in the Navy. Presidential Advisor Bob Haldeman wrote in his daily diary that day "The President considered Zumwalt and his Navy officers had failed to act on the blacks that refused to sail on the Constellation. The President has told Henry Kissinger to have Melvin Laird order all the men court-martialed and to be given dishonorable discharges. However instead, Zumwalt gave them active shore stations with Coca-Colas and ice cream and now he wanted John Ehrlichman to let Zumwalt know that the President was terribly displeased."
- Born: Shawn Green, American MLB player, in Des Plaines, Illinois

== November 11, 1972 (Saturday) ==
- The hijacking of Southern Airways Flight 49 continued as the DC-9 landed in Cleveland for refueling, then flew to Toronto, where the three skyjackers refused $500,000 cash. Taking off again, the airplane circled Knoxville, where the men threatened to crash it into the nuclear plant at Oak Ridge, before landing in Lexington, Kentucky, then returning to Knoxville and Chattanooga, where $2 million ransom was collected and the men took the airplane to Cuba. The jet then made landings in Havana, Key West and McCoy Air Force Base near Orlando, Florida. FBI snipers shot out four of the airplane's tires in an unsuccessful attempt to hinder takeoff. The DC-9 then flew back toward Havana.
- Born: Adam Beach, Canadian First Nations actor, in Ashern, Manitoba
- Died:
  - Berry Oakley, 24, bass guitarist for The Allman Brothers Band. Oakley was killed in a motorcycle accident in Macon, Georgia, and only three blocks away from the scene of the October 29, 1971, accident that had killed band co-founder Duane Allman.
  - Barbara Daly Baekeland, wealthy socialite, was stabbed to death by her 25-year-old son, Antony, in London. The killing, with allegations of incest, was the subject of the 2007 film Savage Grace.
  - Kim Du-han, 54, independent politician for New Democratic. Kim died due to hypertension in Seoul, South Korea after he was in office.

== November 12, 1972 (Sunday) ==
- The hijacking of Southern Airways Flight 49 ended after 29 hours as the DC-9 made an emergency landing in Havana, after several of its tires had been shot out on takeoff by FBI agents hours before. One passenger noted later that "Everyone believed they would be dead in an hour" after the airplane took off on the damaged tires. The three hijackers – Henry Jackson, Lewis Moore and Melvin Cale – were arrested by Cuban authorities. Another Southern Airways jet flew the 27 passengers and four crew back to the United States.
- Born: Vasilios Tsiartas, Greek footballer with 70 caps for the Greece National Team; in Alexandreia
- Died: Rudolf Friml, 92, Czech composer of operettas and musicals

== November 13, 1972 (Monday) ==
- In London, delegates from 79 nations signed the Convention on the Prevention of Marine Pollution by Dumping of Wastes and Other Matter, banning the dumping of oil, mercury, cadmium, and radioactive materials into the ocean.
- At 8:00 in the morning, the Michigan Lottery was inaugurated as Michigan became the fourth U.S. state (after New York, New Jersey and Connecticut) to begin the legal sale of lottery tickets. The "Green Ticket" game was introduced, with each 50 cent ticket having two three-digit numbers, after which drawings were held on November 24 for two sets of three-digit numbers. "A ticket which matches one of the drawn numbers entitles the holder to $25," a press release noted, "and if both numbers match, the bearer gets a chance at a 'super drawing,' in which he can win as much as $200,000. After hopeful winners have purchased 30 million tickets, a 'Million Dollar Drawing' will give previous winners a chance to line their pockets with $50,000 a year for the next 20 years.". Hundreds of ticket holders won on November 24 if they had a ticket with either "130" or "544".
- Born: Takuya Kimura, Japanese actor, in Tokyo

== November 14, 1972 (Tuesday) ==
- The Dow Jones Industrial Average closed above 1,000 (at 1,003.16) for the first time in its history. The Dow had fluctuated above 1,000 five other times, but had never finished the day at four figures.
- One week after his re-election as Vice-President of the United States, Spiro T. Agnew, who had been described in the press as the front-runner for the Republican nomination in 1976, was being undercut by his boss, President Richard M. Nixon. In orders to H.R. Haldeman, Nixon said "We don't want him to have the appearance of heir apparent, but we also don't want to appear to push him down."
- Born:
  - Edyta Górniak, Polish pop singer, in Ziębice
  - Josh Duhamel, American soap opera actor, in Minot, North Dakota
  - Matt Bloom, American pro wrestler, in Peabody, Massachusetts
- Died: Martin Dies, Jr., 72, Congressman from Texas (1931–45, 1953–59) and first chairman of House Un-American Activities Committee (1937–1944)

== November 15, 1972 (Wednesday) ==
- In the first-ever aircraft hijacking in Australia, Ansett Airlines Flight 232 from Adelaide to Alice Springs, with 28 passengers and a crew of four, was taken over by a lone gunman.
- In Rome, Pope Paul VI inspired a debate within the Roman Catholic Church about whether Satan was a real being, or a metaphor for evil. In addressing an audience in a speech entitled "Liberaci dal male" ("Deliver us from evil"), the Pontiff spoke in Italian, and was quoted in one translation as saying "The evil which exists in the world is the result and an effect of the attack upon us and our society by a dark and hostile agent, the devil. Evil is not only a privation, but a living, spiritual, corrupt and corrupting being".
- India's Prime Minister Indira Gandhi responded in writing to a parliamentary question from the Lok Sabha, suggesting that the Indian Atomic Energy Commission was considering the "potential economic benefits and possible environmental hazards" of developing the country's nuclear capability.
- The U.S. city of Denver, Colorado, canceled its plans to host the 1976 Winter Olympics, after having been awarded them by the International Olympic Committee on May 12, 1970. The withdrawal followed the state referendum where Colorado voters rejected a proposition to partially fund the games. On February 4, 1973, the games would be awarded to the Austrian city of Innsbruck.
- Born: Jonny Lee Miller, English actor; in Kingston upon Thames, London

== November 16, 1972 (Thursday) ==
- At the 17th convention of UNESCO, United Nations members signed the "Convention Concerning the Protection of the World Cultural and Natural Heritage", otherwise known as the World Heritage Convention. In the years since 1972, UNESCO has designated areas all over the planet as World Heritage Sites subject to protection.
- The infamous Tuskegee syphilis experiment came to an end as the U.S. Public Health Service ceased further operations of "Tuskegee Study of Untreated Syphilis in the Negro Male".
- A protest by 100 students at historically black Southern University, in Louisiana, was broken up with tear gas by 55 sheriff's deputies and 30 state troopers. Two students, Leonard Brown and Denver Smith, both 20, were killed by a shotgun blast, apparently by one of the deputies, but the shooter was never identified.
- The Pepsi Cola Company announced a deal with Soyuzplodimport for Pepsi to be bottled and sold in the Soviet Union, making the drink the first American cola (and consumer product) to be made in the U.S.S.R. The Soviet-manufactured Pepsi would not reach consumers until May 15, 1974, when the first bottle was sold at the Black Sea resort of Sochi in the Russian SFSR.
- Died: Vera Karalli, 83, Russian ballerina, choreographer and actress

== November 17, 1972 (Friday) ==
- After 17 years in exile, Juan Perón returned to Argentina, where he had been President from 1946 to 1955, accompanied by his wife Isabel Perón. The next day, he addressed a rally of his followers, the "Peronistas". Mr. and Mrs. Perón would become President and Vice-President in 1973, and Isabel would become President after Juan's death in 1974.

== November 18, 1972 (Saturday) ==
- The USS Sanctuary became the first U.S. Navy ship to transport women sailors assigned to sea duty, with 40 enlisted women and 30 nurses assigned to work with the 480 men. The recommissioning of the ship was carried out as "part of a pilot program to evaluate the utilization of women for shipboard duty."
- The women's national soccer football teams for England and Scotland both made their international debuts, with England overcoming a 2–1 deficit to beat Scotland 3–2 in a game in Scotland at Greenock in Renfrewshire. Midfielder Sylvia Gore scored England's first national goal.
- Died: Danny Whitten, 29, guitarist for the band Crazy Horse and later for Neil Young, died of an overdose of alcohol and Valium, on the same day that he was fired by Young, who had given him fifty dollars and an airplane ticket.

== November 19, 1972 (Sunday) ==
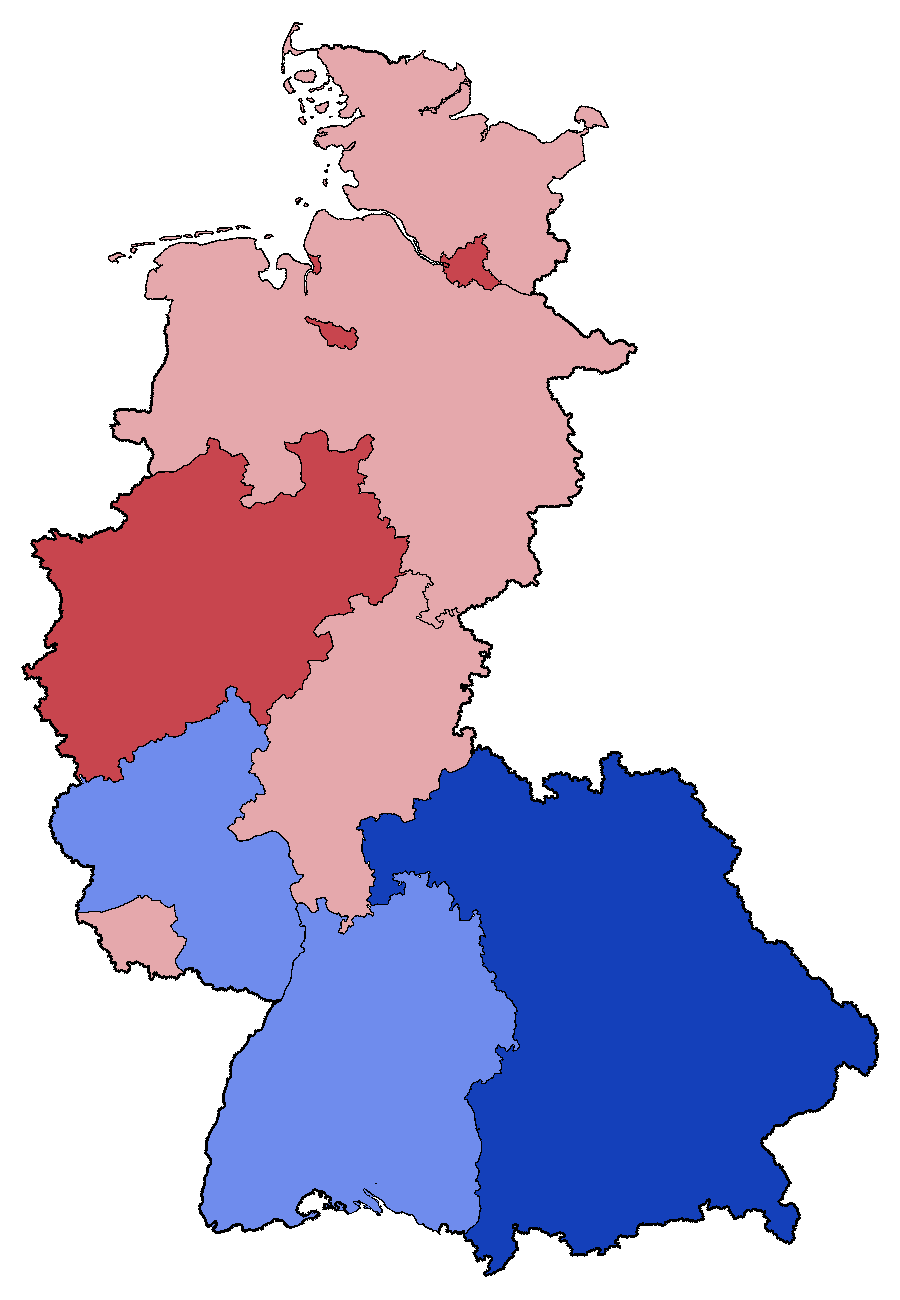
West Germany's north/south election day split SPD (red, pink) and CDU/CSU (blue, light blue)

- In elections in West Germany, the Social Democrat Party led by Chancellor Willy Brandt, in coalition with the Free Democrats, regained a majority (230 SPD, 41 FDP) of 271 seats in the 496 member Bundestag. Rainer Barzel's Christian Democrats (CDU) and its partner the Christian Socialists won 177 and 48 seats, respectively.

== November 20, 1972 (Monday) ==
- At Camp David, U.S. President Nixon began a week of performance reviews of cabinet members, agency chiefs and White House aides, after having asked everyone to submit a resignation on November 8. Included in the group whose departure was accepted were CIA Director Richard Helms, and cabinet secretaries Melvin R. Laird (Defense), James Hodgson (Labor), George W. Romney (HUD), and John A. Volpe (Transportation).

== November 21, 1972 (Tuesday) ==
- The Fourth Republic of South Korea era began with a 91.5% approval of the Yusin Constitution in a national referendum, giving President Park Chung-hee dictatorial powers, including the right to appoint legislators. The Yusin Constitution would be abandoned after Park's assassination in 1979.
- The second phase of the Strategic Arms Limitation Talks between the United States and the Soviet Union (SALT II, and in Russian "OCB-II") began in Geneva. A treaty was signed in 1979, but was not ratified by the United States.
- In Epping, British daredevil Stephen Ladd successfully rode his motorcycle through a 50-yard (46 m) tunnel of fire created by blazing bales of hay, but then persuaded organizers to let him try again as the flames got fiercer. On his second run, Ladd's motorcycle failed inside the tunnel, and he died of his burns.
- The 1970 convictions of five members of the Chicago 7 (on charges of crossing state lines to incite a riot) were reversed by an appellate court, which concluded that Judge Julius J. Hoffman had committed numerous errors. The cases were never retried.
- Born: Krzysztof Szafrański, Polish racing cyclist, in Prudnik, Poland
- Died: Kim Du-han, 54, South Korean mobster, anti-communist activist, soldier, politician

== November 22, 1972 (Wednesday) ==
- An American Boeing B-52 Stratofortress was shot down, the first to be downed by enemy fire in the Vietnam War.
- After his death penalty sentence was set aside, mass murderer Richard Speck was re-sentenced to 1,200 years in prison, at the time the longest American jail term ever ordered.

== November 23, 1972 (Thursday) ==
- The Soviet Union's fourth and final attempt at launching a rocket powerful enough to carry a crewed lunar orbiter failed. The N1 rocket, similar to the American Saturn V, was launched successfully in a secret test, but exploded at an altitude of 40 km (25 mi). "As pieces fell from the sky across the Kazakhstan steppes", wrote one observer later, "so did Russia's dreams of flying cosmonauts to the Moon".
- A sinkhole in Crystal River, Florida "swallowed" a home. The house was destroyed as it sank, over a matter of hours, into a 100-foot-deep (30 m) pit on Thanksgiving morning.
- Born: Alf-Inge Haaland, Norwegian footballer, in Stavanger
- Died: Marie Wilson, 56, American radio and television comedian who portrayed Irma Patterson, the title character of My Friend Irma

== November 24, 1972 (Friday) ==
- In Alaska, the search by the United States Air Force for missing U.S. Congressmen Hale Boggs (House Majority Leader from Louisiana) and Nick Begich (Alaska) was halted after 39 days. The Congressmen, a pilot, and Begich's aide had disappeared on October 16 during a flight from Anchorage to Juneau.

== November 25, 1972 (Saturday) ==
- In New Zealand's general election, the National Party, led by Prime Minister Jack Marshall lost its 45-seat majority in the 87 member New Zealand House of Representatives, as the Labour Party won 55 seats and control of the government. Norman Kirk was sworn in as the 29th Prime Minister of New Zealand on December 8.
- Died: Henri Coandă, 86, Romanian aerodynamics pioneer

== November 26, 1972 (Sunday) ==
- Norway's Defense Minister Johan Kleppe announced that a foreign submarine, hunted for two weeks in the 124-mile (200 km) Sognefjord, had escaped back to sea. It was speculated that the object had been a Soviet sub, and that it had been allowed to slip away to avoid further tensions.
- Born:
  - Christopher Fitzgerald, American theatrical actor, in Bryn Mawr, Pennsylvania
  - Arjun Rampal, Bollywood actor, in Jabalpur, India

== November 27, 1972 (Monday) ==
- In the first episode of the fourth season of Sesame Street, the character of "The Count" (officially Count von Count) was introduced. True to his name, the friendly children's show puppet vampire (performed by Jerry Nelson) helped children count.

== November 28, 1972 (Tuesday) ==
- Japan Airlines Flight 446 crashed shortly after takeoff from Moscow on a flight to Tokyo, killing 62 of the 76 people on board.
- The Uris Theatre (later the George Gershwin Theatre) opened on Broadway in New York, with the unsuccessful rock musical Via Galactica.
- The Canadian Football Hall of Fame opened in Hamilton, Ontario.
- Died: Havergal Brian, 96, British classical composer

== November 29, 1972 (Wednesday) ==
- Atari, Inc. released the seminal arcade version of Pong, the first such game to achieve commercial success.
- Born: Brian Baumgartner, American actor, in Atlanta
- Died: Carl W. Stalling, 81, American composer

== November 30, 1972 (Thursday) ==
- The Kukkiwon, World Taekwondo Headquarters, was opened in Seoul as interest in the Korean martial art continued to grow.
- The Rite of Anointing and Pastoral Care of the Sick was promulgated by Pope Paul VI in the document Sacram unctionem infirmorum, replacing the traditional Roman Catholic "last rites" (extreme unction). The sacrament can be given for persons at risk of death without postponement until the last moments of life.
- As the "Cod War" between fishing trawlers in the North Atlantic Ocean escalated, the British Foreign Secretary, Sir Alec Douglas-Home announced that Royal Navy ships would be stationed to protect British trawlers off the coast of Iceland.
- Died: Sir Compton Mackenzie, 89, Scottish writer
