= New Democratic Party (disambiguation) =

New Democratic Party may refer to:

== Canada ==
- The New Democratic Party, a social democratic political party in Canada
- Any of its provincial or territorial sections:

- Alberta New Democratic Party
- British Columbia New Democratic Party
- New Democratic Party of Manitoba
- New Brunswick New Democratic Party
- Newfoundland and Labrador New Democratic Party
- Nova Scotia New Democratic Party
- Ontario New Democratic Party

- Metro New Democratic Party, an informal party of New Democratic Party members in metro Toronto municipal politics in the late 20th century

- New Democratic Party of Prince Edward Island
- New Democratic Party of Quebec (1963) or Parti de la démocratie socialiste (1963–2002), which disaffiliated from the federal party in 1991
- Saskatchewan New Democratic Party
- Yukon New Democratic Party

- New Democratic Party of Quebec (2014), a revival of the 1963–2002 Quebec party unconnected to the federal New Democratic Party

== Other countries ==
=== Active ===
- New Democratic Party (Kachin), founded 2019 in Kachin State, Myanmar
- New Democratic Party (Saint Vincent and the Grenadines), a right-wing party in Saint Vincent and the Grenadines
- Social Democratic Party (Serbia), known as the New Democratic Party from June to October 2014
- New Democratic Party of Serbia, formerly known as the Democratic Party of Serbia

=== Defunct ===
- New Democratic Party (Albania), 1999–2009
- New Democratic Party (New Zealand), 1972–1976
- New Democratic Party (South Korea), 1963–1980
- The New Democrats (France), 2020–2022
- United New Democratic Party (South Korea), 2007–2008

== See also ==
- Democratic Party (disambiguation)
- New Democracy Party (disambiguation)
- New Democracy (disambiguation)
- New Democratic Front (disambiguation)
- New Democratic Party of Quebec (disambiguation)
- New Democrats, a faction in the United States Democratic Party
