= December 1972 =

Month of 1972

<<	December 1972					>>
Su	Mo	Tu	We	Th	Fr	Sa
					1	2
3	4	5	6	7	8	9
10	11	12	13	14	15	16
17	18	19	20	21	22	23
24	25	26	27	28	29	30
31

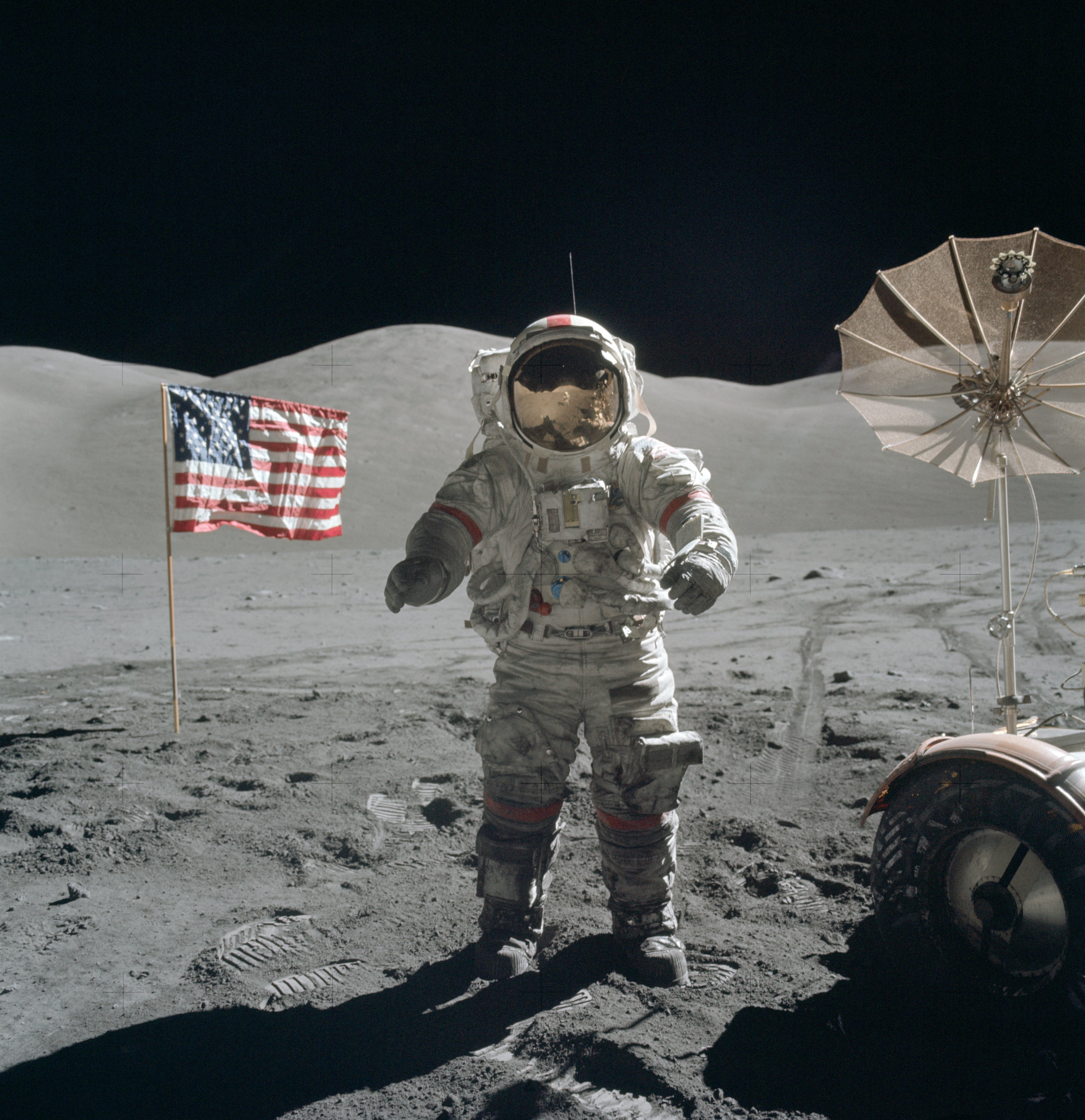
December 14, 1972: Apollo 17 astronaut Eugene Cernan becomes the last person to walk on the Moon

The following events occurred in December 1972:

== December 1, 1972 (Friday) ==
- India and Pakistan exchanged prisoners of war taken during the 1971 war between the two nations. In all, 542 Pakistanis and 639 Indians were repatriated.
- Died: Antonio Segni, 81, Prime Minister of Italy 1955-1957, 1959-1960; President of Italy, 1962 to 1964

== December 2, 1972 (Saturday) ==
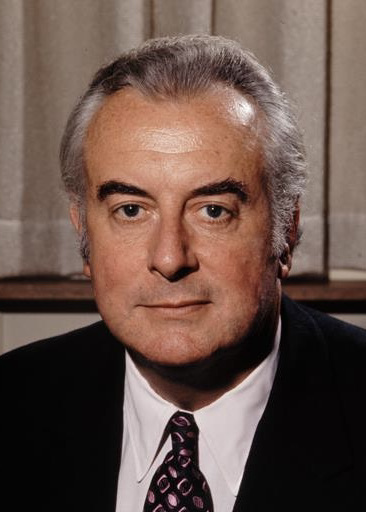
Gough Whitlam

- In elections in Australia, the Australian Labor Party (ALP), led by Gough Whitlam, won 67 of the 125 seats in the House of Representatives, to take control of the government from the coalition of the Liberal Party (headed by Prime Minister William McMahon) and the Country Party, removing the Liberals from a majority for the first time in 23 years. However, since the election was only for the House of Representatives, the DLP held the balance of power in the Senate. This in effect deprived the incoming Labor Government a Senate majority. Whitlam was sworn in as Prime Minister three days later and introduced dramatic economic, social and political reforms, including withdrawal of troops from Vietnam, freeing imprisoned draft protesters, and setting up ties with China, North Vietnam and East Germany.
- One of the most spectacular examples of a sinkhole was formed in a matter of hours in Shelby County, Alabama. The "December Giant", also known as the "Golly Hole", sank to a depth of 150 feet (46 m) and left a 450-by-350-foot-wide (140 by 110 m) crater.
- Died:
  - José Limón, 64, Mexican choreographer
  - Ip Man, 79, master of Wing Chun Kung Fu

== December 3, 1972 (Sunday) ==
- Spantax Flight 275 crashed shortly after takeoff from Tenerife, killing all 155 people on board. Of the 148 passengers, 143 were West German travelers returning to Munich following the end of a South Atlantic Ocean liner cruise.
- Died: Bill Johnson, 100, American jazz musician

== December 4, 1972 (Monday) ==
- Ramón Ernesto Cruz, who had been elected President of Honduras in 1971, was overthrown in a coup led by the Army. General Oswaldo López Arellano, who had handed power over to Cruz following the election, returned to office as president.
- Steven Stayner, age 7, was kidnapped while walking home from school in Merced, California. For more than seven years, Steven would live as "Dennis Parnell" with his kidnapper, Kenneth Parnell, until Parnell kidnapped another child, Timmy White. Stayner would be reunited with his family at age 14 after he and White went to the police in Ukiah, California. The story became a book and a 1988 television movie, with the title I Know My First Name Is Steven.

== December 5, 1972 (Tuesday) ==
- Screening of all passengers and carry-on luggage would be required in all American airports by January 5, 1973, under emergency regulations announced the United States Department of Transportation. Federal funds would pay for the equipment, and the additional personnel would be paid for by the airlines and airport operators. There had been 29 hijackings in the United States in 1972. In 1973 there were two.
- A United States appellate court panel set aside a regulation that would have required airbags in motor vehicles made on or after August 15, 1975.
- A U.S. government spokesman, who asked not to be identified, announced that for the first time in United States history, the fertility rate had dropped below the zero population growth (ZPG) standard of 2.11 births for every woman, from 2.28 in 1971 to 2.04 in 1972.

== December 6, 1972 (Wednesday) ==
- The United Nations, through UNESCO, voted to fund the restoration of Borobudur, a Buddhist shrine constructed in the 9th century in Indonesia. The work was completed in 1983.
- Died: Janet Munro, 38, British actress, died of alcohol-related myocarditis.

== December 7, 1972 (Thursday) ==
- The last draft call for induction of American adult males into the U.S. Armed Forces was made, and no person has been drafted into the U.S. military in more than half a century since then.

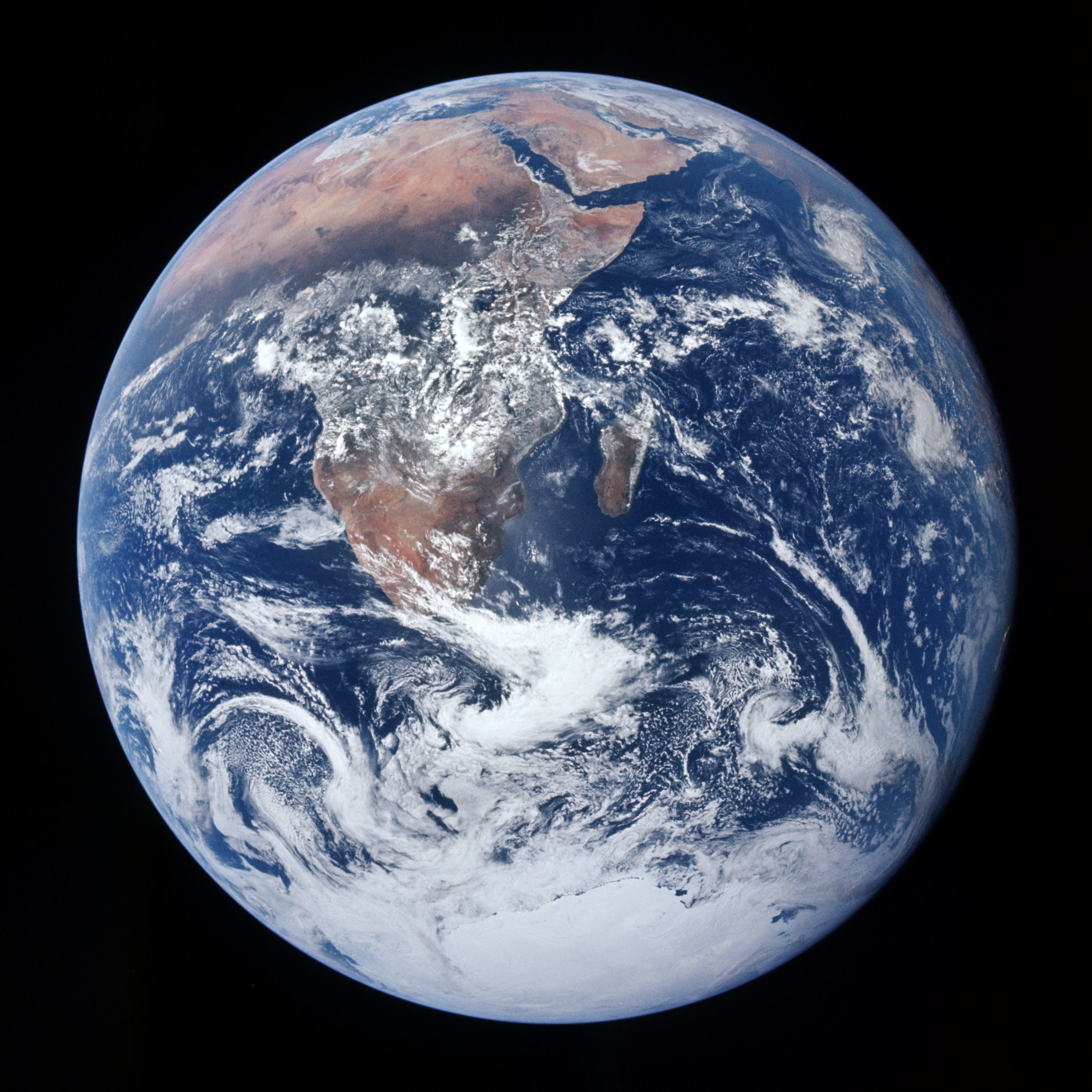
The Blue Marble

- Imelda Marcos, First Lady of the Philippines, was slashed repeatedly by a bolo knife–wielding assassin, who attacked her at an awards ceremony at the Nayong Pilipino theme park in Pasay. Mrs. Marcos required 75 stitches.
- Apollo 17 was launched from Cape Kennedy at 12:33 a.m. EST after a delay of nearly three hours. Carrying astronauts Gene Cernan, Ronald Evans, Harrison Schmitt, and five mice, the mission was the last crewed trip to the Moon for at least 50 years. With an orbital trajectory that permitted a fully illuminated view of the entire planet, the crew snapped a famous image of the planet, colloquially called The Blue Marble. After three hours, rockets were fired and the three astronauts of Apollo 17 became the last people for over 50 years to go beyond the orbit of the Earth.
- Born:
  - Hermann Maier, Austrian skier; in Altenmarkt im Pongau
  - Tammy Lynn Sytch, American wrestling personality

== December 8, 1972 (Friday) ==
- United Airlines Flight 553 Boeing 737 from Washington to Chicago crashed at 2:29 p.m. while attempting to land at Chicago Midway Airport during an ice storm. Killed were 43 of 61 people on board, and two people in a house at 3722 W. 70th Place. The dead included Dorothy Hunt (wife of Watergate conspirator E. Howard Hunt), CBS News reporter Michelle Clark, and Illinois Congressman George W. Collins. This was the first fatal crash of a Boeing 737.
- Florida became the first state, since the June 29 U.S. Supreme Court ruling in Furman v. Georgia, to reinstate capital punishment. Governor Reubin Askew signed the bill into law a week after it had passed both houses of the State Legislature.
- Dr. Mahmoud Hamshari, the PLO representative in France, was fatally wounded by a bomb, planted near his telephone by agents of Israel's Mossad, in retaliation for his suspected role in the 1972 Munich Massacre. After the explosive had been placed during Hamshari's absence, an agent telephoned him and asked enough questions to confirm his identity. The bomb was then detonated by remote control, possibly by a signal through the telephone line.

== December 9, 1972 (Saturday) ==
- Pilot Marten Hartwell was rescued in the Canadian Arctic more than a month after he and three other people had crashed near Great Bear Lake in the Northwest Territories. The plane's disappearance had led to the largest aviation search in Canada's history.
- Born: Tré Cool (Frank Edwin Wright III), drummer and backup singer for the group Green Day; in Frankfurt, West Germany.
- Died Louella Parsons, 91, American gossip columnist

== December 10, 1972 (Sunday) ==
- In Japan's parliamentary election, the Liberal Democratic Party won again, losing 24 seats but retaining 271 of the 491 in the lower house of the Diet.
- Amnesty International launched its first worldwide Campaign for the Abolition of Torture.
- Richard Fliehr made his professional wrestling debut in Rice Lake, Wisconsin, under the name of Ric Flair.
- The American League adopted the designated hitter rule, initially on a three-year trial.
- Born: Brian Molko, British-American musician for the band Placebo; in Brussels, Belgium

== December 11, 1972 (Monday) ==
- People from Earth landed on the Moon for the sixth and last time, as the Apollo 17 lunar module Challenger touched down at 19:54 UTC (1:54 pm Houston time) at the Taurus–Littrow crater.
- Soviet and Chinese soldiers clashed at the border, with several of the Soviet soldiers being killed.
- "Don't Buy Farah Day" was declared by the Amalgamated Clothing Workers union, which asked Americans nationwide to boycott the non-union Farah Manufacturing, in protest over low wages and benefits paid by one of the largest clothing makers in the United States. During the course of a strike that lasted from May 1972 to March 1974, Farah's sales dropped by twenty million dollars.
- Born: Daniel Alfredsson, Swedish NHL player; in Gothenburg

== December 12, 1972 (Tuesday) ==
- A boatload with 65 Haitian refugees, mostly black, landed in Florida, the first "boat people" to flee from Haiti to the United States. Landings were sporadic until 1978, when thousands of Haitians, fleeing the Duvalier regime, began seeking sanctuary in the U.S.
- MCA Inc. unveiled Disco-Vision, a videodisc system to rival RCA's SelectaVision. The picture quality was poor and the system never went on sale.
- Born: Chris Senn, professional skateboarder; in Grass Valley, California

== December 13, 1972 (Wednesday) ==
- North Vietnam's negotiators walked out of the Paris Peace Talks. President Nixon issued an ultimatum to the North Vietnamese to return to the talks within 72 hours, or face severe measures. On December 18, the United States began Operation Linebacker II, the most massive aerial bombardment ever made of North Vietnam.
- Born: Chris Grant, Australian rules football star; in Daylesford, Victoria

== December 14, 1972 (Thursday) ==
- Shortly after midnight Eastern Standard Time, American astronaut Eugene Cernan climbed into the Lunar Module Challenger, following after Harrison Schmitt, having been the last person to have set foot on the Moon for at least 50 years; the scheduled end of the Apollo 17 moonwalk had been 0433 GMT (11:33 pm December 13 EST). At 2255 GMT (5:55 pm EST), the cabin of the Challenger lunar module lifted off from the surface of the Moon with Cernan and Schmitt, to return to lunar orbit. As of 2026, NASA was working on the return of astronauts to the lunar surface with the Artemis IV mission, but a launch will take place no earlier than 2028.
- Willy Brandt was re-elected as Chancellor of West Germany, needing 247 votes in the 493 member Bundestag, and receiving 269.
- Born: Miranda Hart, English comedian and actress; in Torquay, Devon.

== December 15, 1972 (Friday) ==
- The United Nations Environment Program (UNEP) was created by a 112–0 vote of the UN General Assembly.
- The Commonwealth of Australia Conciliation and Arbitration Commission issued a decision requiring equal pay for women.
- Died:
  - Adrian Stokes, 70, British writer, painter and art critic
  - Bob Mosher, 57, TV sitcom writer and producer known for Leave It to Beaver and The Munsters, died of an inoperable brain tumor.

== December 16, 1972 (Saturday) ==
- Over 300 civilians— men, women and children— were massacred by Portuguese troops in the east African village of Wiriamu in Mozambique, at that time a colony of Portugal. The murder was made in retaliation for the ambush of a Portuguese Army patrol the day before. At least 328 bodies were buried later, although observers concluded that the number of victims was more than 400. Like Lidice, Wiriamu was razed. Unlike Lidice, Wiriamu was never rebuilt.
- The Apollo 17 orbiter began its return to Earth, as the America became the last crewed spacecraft to orbit the Moon.
- Six people were killed in a small plane crash in Cheektowaga, New York. The pilot of a twin engine Cessna 421 was unable to return to the Buffalo Niagara International Airport and slammed into two homes killing his two passengers and three people in two houses on Diane Drive in Cheektowaga.

== December 17, 1972 (Sunday) ==
- Running back Dave Hampton became the first player for the Atlanta Falcons to rush for 1,000 yards in a season, as Atlanta closed its season against the Kansas City Chiefs. On his next carry, Hampton was tackled for a five-yard loss, and finished 1972 with 995 yards rushing.
- Died: Rodolfo Cadena, 30, founder of the Mexican Mafia prison gang at the California Institution for Men, after being stabbed 70 times by members of a rival gang.

== December 18, 1972 (Monday) ==
- Operation Linebacker II, described more generally as the Christmas Bombing and sometimes as "The Eleven-Day War", began at 2:51 pm as the first of 87 B-52 bombers, piloted by Major Bill Stocker, lifted off from Andersen AFB in Guam. These were joined by 42 more B-52s flying from Thailand, along with 400 fighters and refueling tankers. At 7:40 pm Hanoi time, from an altitude of 35,000 feet (11,000 m), the bombers began dropping their payloads on targets in North Vietnam, and were met by hundreds of SAM missiles and some MiG-21 fighters. There were 121 bombing runs in the first 24 hours.
- Neilia Hunter Biden, the wife of U.S. Senator-elect (and future U.S. vice-president and President) Joe Biden, was killed in a traffic accident, along with the couple's 13-month-old daughter, Naomi. Mrs. Biden's car was struck by a tractor-trailer at 2:30 pm as she pulled into an intersection near Hockessin, Delaware. The Bidens' two sons, aged three and four, were injured.
- Born: Lawrence Wong (Wong Shyun Tsai), Prime Minister of Singapore since 2024 and the fourth person to hold the office; in Singapore

== December 19, 1972 (Tuesday) ==
- The supertanker Sea Star collided with another ship and spilled 144,000,000 litres (32,000,000 imp gal; 38,000,000 US gal) of petroleum into the Persian Gulf.
- Apollo 17 returned to Earth, concluding the Apollo program of lunar exploration.
- Born:
  - Warren Sapp, American NFL defensive tackle, 1999 NFL Defensive Player of the Year and 2013 inductee to the Pro Football Hall of Fame; in Orlando, Florida
  - Alyssa Milano, American TV actress known for Charmed and Who's the Boss?; in Brooklyn

== December 20, 1972 (Wednesday) ==
- The last Australian servicemen to serve in the Vietnam War were brought home.
- Neil Simon's play The Sunshine Boys was first performed, at the Broadhurst Theatre on Broadway.
- The Northrop M2-F3, the "wingless airplane", made its final flight, achieving an altitude of 71,500 feet (21,800 m).
- Ten passengers on North Central Airlines Flight 575 were killed at Chicago's O'Hare Airport, after the DC-9 jet was cleared for takeoff on Runway 27L to Madison, Wisconsin at the same time that a plane that had just arrived from Tampa, Delta Air Lines Flight 954, a CV-880, was taxiing across Runway 27L due to an air traffic ground control miscommunication. Flight 575 collided with Delta Flight 954 at eight seconds past six o'clock in the evening, 44 seconds after it had accelerated for takeoff from O'Hare's Runway 27L. Specifically, the investigating agency concluded that the ground controller's statement "pull over to thirty-two pad" for holding, without specifying whether it was the 32R holding pad that the Delta CV-880 had rolled past, or the 32L pad on the other side of the runway.

== December 21, 1972 (Thursday) ==
- The Grundlagenvertrag, or Basic Treaty, between the Federal Republic of Germany (West Germany) and the German Democratic Republic (East Germany), was signed in East Berlin after negotiations as part of West Germany's Ostpolitik change in policy toward its Communist neighbor to the east. The two nations agreed to "develop normal good-neighbourly relations" and to "reaffirm the inviolability now and in the future of the border existing between them", as well as resolving that "neither of the two States can represent the other".
- Died: General Paul Hausser, 92, Commander of the German Waffen-SS, activist in rehabilitation of former SS members, and Commander-in-Chief of the German Seventh Army in Normandy during D-Day

== December 22, 1972 (Friday) ==
- The Australian Broadcasting Corporation (ABC) children's television show Adventure Island broadcast its 1,175th and final episode after a run of five years.
- The Bach Mai Hospital in Hanoi was struck by seven bombs dropped by American airplanes on the fifth day of Operation Linebacker II. Eighteen people— physicians, medical students, nurses and patients— were killed.
- Roberto Canessa and Fernando Parrado emerged from the Andes mountains to give the news that they and 14 others had survived the October 13 Uruguayan plane crash in the Andes. A Chilean Air Force helicopter picked up six of the men, and the other eight were rescued the next day.
- Born: Vanessa Paradis, French singer and actress; in Saint-Maur-des-Fossés, Val-de-Marne département

== December 23, 1972 (Saturday) ==
- At 12:29 a.m., an earthquake of 6.2 magnitude leveled Managua, the capital of Nicaragua, and killed more than 10,000 people, destroyed 589 city blocks, and left 400,000 homeless.
- Braathens Flight 239, a Norwegian airplane flight from Ålesund to Oslo, crashed while attempting a landing, killing 40 of the 45 persons on board.
- The Pittsburgh Steelers beat the Oakland Raiders 13–7, on a last second play that became known as "The Immaculate Reception". The term was used on WTAE-TV's 11 o'clock news by Steelers announcer Myron Cope, who gave credit to a fan, Michael Ord, for coining it, and Sharon Levosky, a friend of Ord's, who called Cope. With 0:22 left, the Steelers trailed 7–6, and were at fourth and 10 on their own 40-yard line. Terry Bradshaw threw a pass that was deflected, and then caught by Franco Harris, who ran 60 yards for the winning touchdown.
- Died: Andrei Tupolev, 84, Russian aeronautical engineer and designer of more than 100 different types of Soviet aircraft

== December 24, 1972 (Sunday) ==
- U.S. bombing of North Vietnam was temporarily halted for 36 hours at 8:00 am local time on Christmas Eve, although Radio Hanoi reported that raids had continued as late as 7:30 pm.
- Khan Abdul Ghaffar Khan, leader of the Pakhtoon people, was allowed to return to Pakistan after an exile of eight years, after he agreed to drop calls for an independent "Pakhtoonistan".
- Died: Charles Atlas (stage name for Angelo Sicilano), 80, American bodybuilder and developer of dynamic tension program sold by mail

== December 25, 1972 (Monday) ==
- An unpublished decree took effect in the U.S.S.R., making it illegal for Soviet residents to meet with foreigners "for the purpose of disseminating false or slanderous information about the Soviet Union", a definition that covered most dissidents. Confirmation of the decree's existence would not be made until more than five months later.
- Yuri Andropov, the Director of the KGB, recommended that the Soviet Politburo allocate $100,000 in U.S. currency to influence the March parliamentary elections in Chile. The Politburo approved the transfer on February 7, 1973.
- Born: Qu Yunxia, Chinese middle-distance runner and holder of the women's 1500 m world record (3:50.46) which stood for 22 years
- Died: Chakravarti Rajagopalachari, 94, Indian freedom-fighter and the last Governor-General of India, from 1948 to 1950

== December 26, 1972 (Tuesday) ==
- In what has been described as the airstrike that "decided the entire air war over North Vietnam", Operation Linebacker II saw 220 American aircraft strike targets over a fifteen-minute period, destroying a missile assembly facility, and crippling radar stations and airbases. The North Vietnamese agreed to resume peace talks after three more days of bombing. The bombings on the day after Christmas also destroyed residences and businesses on Hanoi's Kham Tien Street, killing 215 civilians.
- The Santiago, Chile, newspaper El Mercurio broke the story that the 16 survivors of the Uruguayan plane crash in the Andes mountains had turned to cannibalism to avoid starvation.
- The Soviet Union's governing Presidium approved an order changing the "Chinese-sounding names" of nine cities in Siberia that had been seized by the Russian Empire from China in 1860. Suchan, with 48,000 people, was renamed Partizansk, while Tetyukhi became Dalnegorsk and the mining and shipping town of Teyukhe-Pristan became Rudnaya Pristan (Russian for "Ore Port"). Iman became Dalnerechensk ("Far river") and Manzovka was redubbed Sibirtsevo.

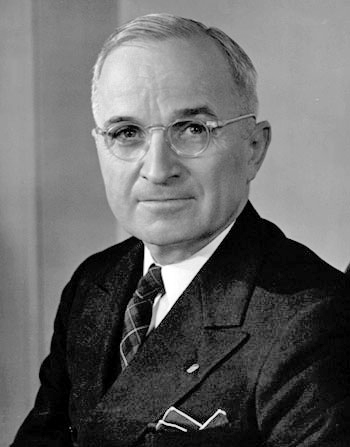
U.S. President Truman (d.Dec. 26, 1972)

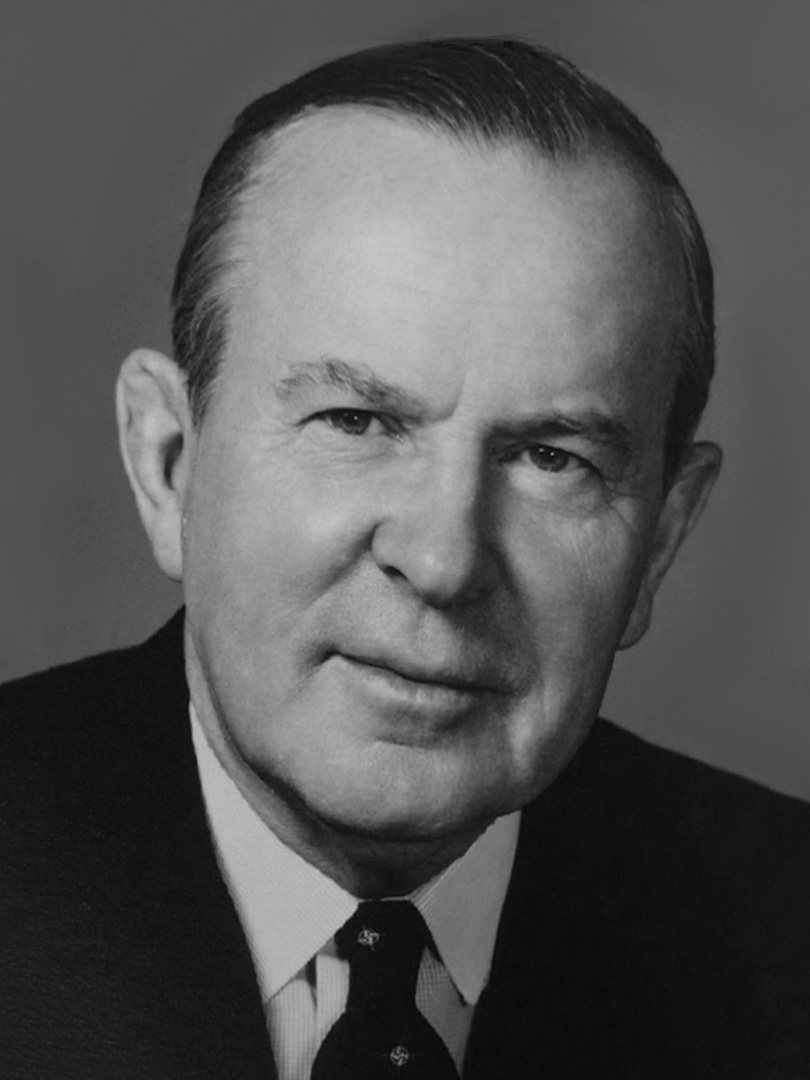
Canadian PM Pearson (d.Dec. 27, 1972)

- Died: Harry S. Truman, 88, the 33rd President of the United States from 1945 to 1953, died at 7:50 am in Kansas City.

== December 27, 1972 (Wednesday) ==
- New constitutions took effect, independently of each other, in both South Korea and North Korea.
- The Environmental Protection Agency issued new regulations requiring unleaded gasoline to be available in all American stations no later than July 1, 1974, with a limit of 0.05 grams (0.0018 oz) of lead per gallon.
- Nineteen people were killed near Fort Sumner, New Mexico, when a church bus was struck by a cattle truck. The bus was one of two belonging to the Woodlawn Baptist Church of Austin, Texas, and was carrying a youth group to a ski resort.
- Born: Colin Charvis, Welsh rugby player; in Sutton Coldfield
- Died: Lester B. Pearson, 75, 14th Prime Minister of Canada (1963–1968) and 1957 Nobel Peace Prize laureate

== December 28, 1972 (Thursday) ==
- At the age of 20, Prince Vajiralongkorn was designated as Crown Prince of Thailand by his father, King Bhumibol Adulyadej.
- Kim Il Sung, who was already (since 1948) the Prime Minister of North Korea and General Secretary of its Workers' Party, became the nation's first President, when the office was created as part of a new Constitution.
- Born:
  - Adam Vinatieri, American football placekicker and the NFL's all-time leading scorer, having made 2,673 points on field goals and extra point kicks for the New England Patriots and the Indianapolis Colts in 24 seasons; in Yankton, South Dakota
  - Patrick Rafter, Australian tennis player, ranked No. 1 in the world 1999; U.S. Open champion 1997 and 1998; in Pembroke, Bermuda

== December 29, 1972 (Friday) ==
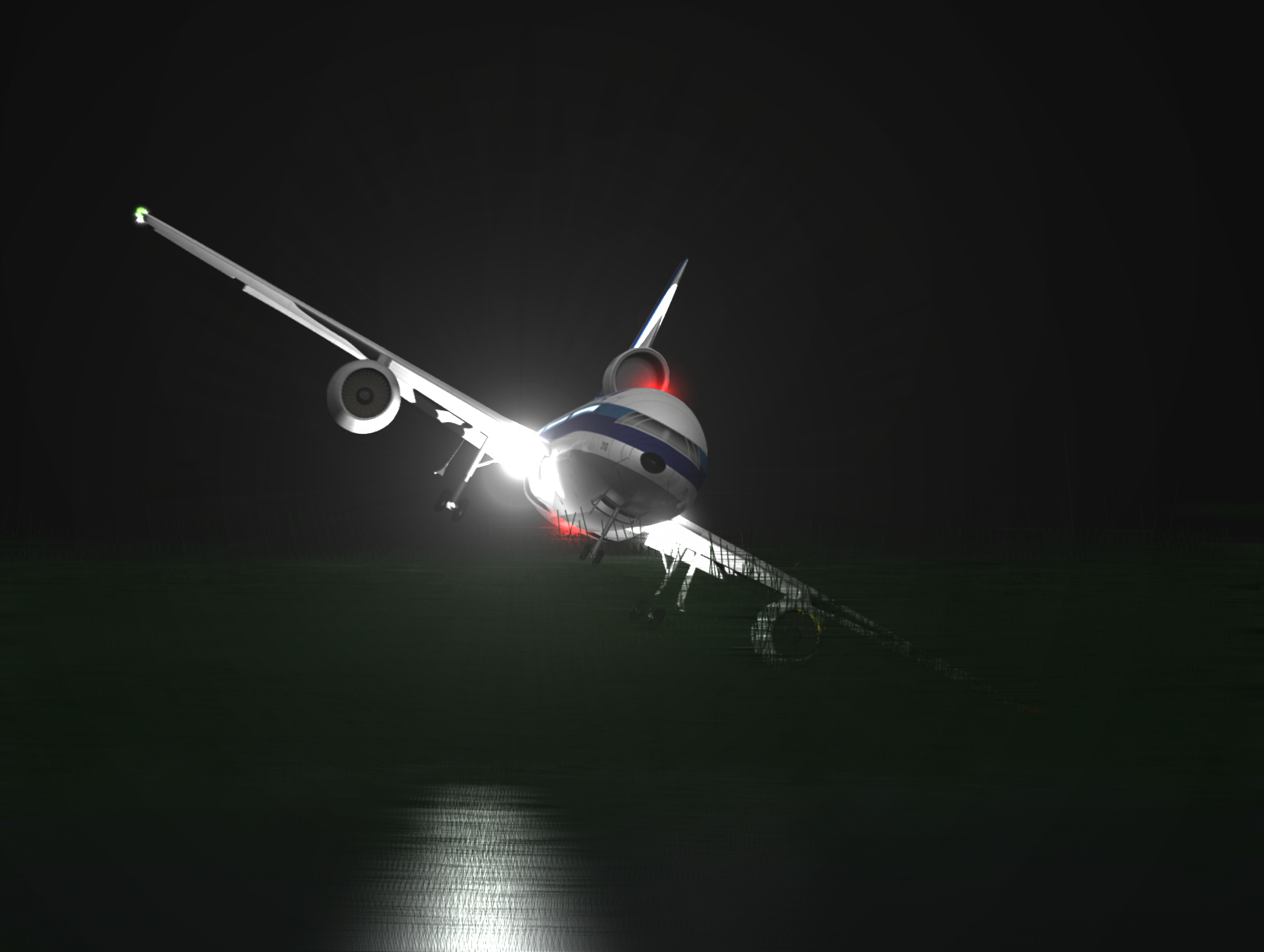
Artist's rendition of Eastern Air Lines Flight 401 before its crash

- At 11:42 p.m., Eastern Air Lines Flight 401 crashed into the Everglades in Florida, killing 101 of 176 on board. The cockpit crew had been preoccupied with checking the L-1011's landing gear when a light on the instrument panel had failed to come on. Distracted, nobody realized that the autopilot had become disengaged, and that they were slowly losing altitude. The last recorded words were the co-pilot saying "We did something to the altitude. We're still at 2000, right?" and the pilot responding, "Hey, what's happening here?" Ghosts of the dead are said to have been seen by others, as described in John G. Fuller's bestseller Ghost of Flight 401.
- Edward Lorenz proposed the now-famous butterfly effect in a paper delivered to the American Association for the Advancement of Science, entitled "Predictability: Does the Flap of a Butterfly's Wings in Brazil Set Off a Tornado in Texas?"
- Life magazine's final weekly issue carried the December 29, 1972, date, though it was on newsstands the week before, the first issue having been on November 23, 1936.
- The U.S. Army received its last draftees. After the close of the Vietnam War conscription of Americans into the service ceased, and all services were composed of volunteers.
- The takeover of Israel's embassy in Thailand, by Palestinian terrorists, ended peacefully after intervention by Egypt's ambassador and Thai officials. The four Arab gunmen, granted safe passage to Cairo, released their Israeli hostages, including the ambassador. Before everyone departed, the Egyptian and Israeli ambassadors, the four gunmen and five diplomats all ate dinner together inside the embassy.
- Died: Joseph Cornell, 69, American sculptor and philosopher

== December 30, 1972 (Saturday) ==
- The "Christmas Bombing" of North Vietnam was halted by order of U.S. President Nixon, after the North Vietnamese agreed to resume negotiations with Henry Kissinger beginning on January 8. A total of 20,370 tons of bombs were dropped on North Vietnam over eleven days. The North Vietnamese government reported later that 1,318 civilians had been killed in Hanoi during the air raids, including 28 at the Bach Mai Hospital.
- Born: Kerry Collins, American NFL quarterback; in Lebanon, Pennsylvania

== December 31, 1972 (Sunday) ==
- In the Philippines, decree Number 86 of President Ferdinand Marcos created the barangay system.
- In the tiny principality of Andorra, Julià Reig Ribó returned to office as the First Syndic, the chief executive officer as selected by the General Council for a term of three years. He succeeded Francesc Escude-Ferrero, who had replaced him at the end of 1966. Reig Ribó would serve until December 29, 1978; Estanislau Sangrá Font would succeed him. The nominal co-princes of Andorra at the time were Joan Martí i Alanis (Spain's Bishop of Urgel) and Georges Pompidou (President of France).
- Another leap second (23:59:60) was added to the end of the year, making 1972 the only year to have two leap seconds, and thus the longest year in human history.
- Born: Joey McIntyre, American actor and singer, in Needham, Massachusetts
- Died: Roberto Clemente, 38, star of the Pittsburgh Pirates, was killed along with four other people while on an errand of mercy to earthquake victims in Managua. At 9:22 pm, his DC-7 crashed into the Atlantic shortly after takeoff from San Juan, Puerto Rico. Clemente's body was never found. Clemente was inducted into baseball's Hall of Fame in 1973.
