= New Democracy Party =

New Democracy Party may refer to:

- New Democracy Party of China
- New Democracy Party (Guinea-Bissau)
- New Democracy Party (Lithuania)
- New Democracy Party (Portugal)
- New Democracy Party (South Korea)
- New Democracy Party (Thailand)

== See also ==
- New Democracy (disambiguation)
- New Democratic Party (disambiguation)
