= New Democracy (disambiguation) =

New Democracy is a stage of development in Maoism.

New Democracy may also refer to:

== Political parties ==
- New Democracy (Andorra)
- New Democracy (Canada), a defunct political party
- New Democracy (Greece), a centre-right political party
- Communist Party of India (Marxist–Leninist) New Democracy
- New Democracy (Kosovo)
- New Democracy (North Macedonia)
- New Democracy (Portugal)
- New Democracy (Serbia)
- New Democracy (Sweden)
- New Democracy (Slovakia)
- New Democracy (Yugoslavia)
- New Democracy - Yes, a progressive regionalist party in Poland

== Other ==
- New Democracy (mural), a 1944 mural in Mexico City

== See also ==
- The New Democrats, the French centre left political party
- New Democrats (United States), the ideological centrist faction of the Democratic Party in the United States
- New Democrat Coalition, the caucus in the United States House of Representatives
- Neo Democrats, a pro-democracy, localist political group in Hong Kong
- New Democracy Party (disambiguation)
- New Democratic Party (disambiguation)

== Arts ==
- New Democracy, a 1944-1945 mural by David Alfaro Siqueiros
