= October 1972 =

Month of 1972

| << | October 1972 | | | | | >> |
| Su | Mo | Tu | We | Th | Fr | Sa |
| 1 | 2 | 3 | 4 | 5 | 6 | 7 |
| 8 | 9 | 10 | 11 | 12 | 13 | 14 |
| 15 | 16 | 17 | 18 | 19 | 20 | 21 |
| 22 | 23 | 24 | 25 | 26 | 27 | 28 |
| 29 | 30 | 31 |

October 30, 1972: Liberals win 109 seats, Progressive Conservatives 107 in Canadian election for House of Commons

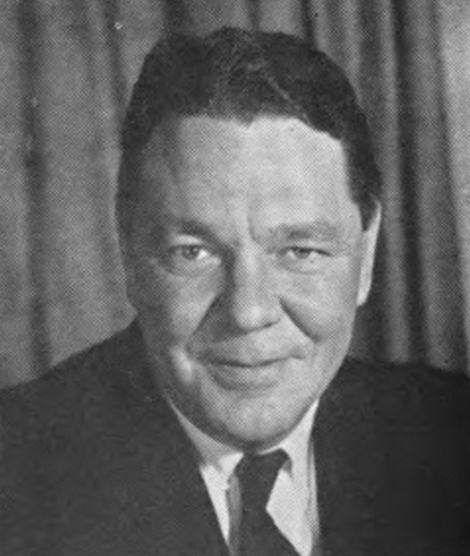
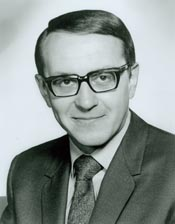
October 16, 1972: U.S. Congressmen Hale Boggs and Nick Begich disappear in Alaskan plane crash

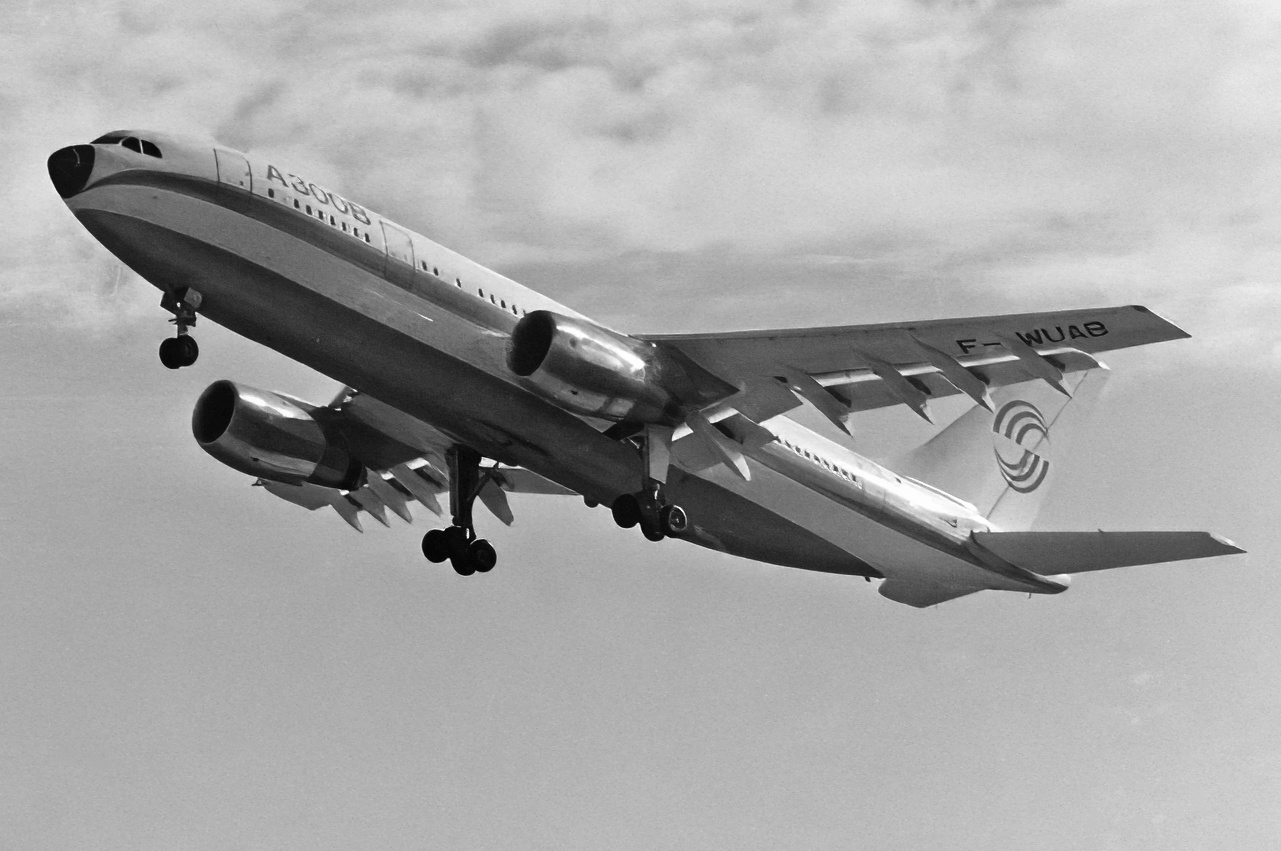
October 28, 1972: Airbus A300 makes its first flight

The following events occurred in October 1972:

== October 1, 1972 (Sunday) ==
- The first reports were made about the production of a recombinant DNA molecule, marking the birth of modern molecular biology methodology.
- Malaysia Singapore Airlines broke up into two companies, Singapore Airlines (SIA), with 10 aircraft, and Malaysia Airlines. SIA now serves 80 cities in 40 nations around the world.
- An explosion on board the USS Newport News killed 19 sailors and injured ten others. The blast occurred off of the coast of South Vietnam at about 1:00 a.m. local time.
- Florida's new death penalty statute, the first to be passed in the United States since the U.S. Supreme Court decision that declared all existing capital punishment laws unconstitutional, went into effect.
- The Oregon Minimum Deposit Law took effect, as Oregon became the first state to require a deposit on all beverage containers, including cans.
- Died:
  - Louis Leakey, 69, Kenyan-born British anthropologist known for his 1959 discovery (with his wife, Mary Leakey) of the remains of Zinjanthropus, a 1.7 million-year old ancestor of humans.
  - Neville Goddard, 67, Barbadian author and mystic, died of an esophageal rupture. the author's death certificate cites the esophageal rupture. He had been a resident of Los Angeles for roughly 20 years.

== October 2, 1972 (Monday) ==
- Voters in Denmark approved the Treaty of Accession in a referendum, with 63.5% voting in favor of joining the European Economic Community, known as the "Common Market". One week earlier, voters in neighboring Norway had rejected the treaty.
- An Aeroflot Il-18 airliner crashed at Sochi, in the Soviet Union, killing all 109 people on board.
- The Indian State of Rajasthan launched the Antyodaya Programme, which would identify the five poorest families in each of the state's villages, and then provide government assistance for one year in the form of allotting land for cultivation, bank loans, assistance in finding employment, or a pension. The experiment was less successful in the states of Uttar Pradesh and Himachal Pradesh.

== October 3, 1972 (Tuesday) ==
- The Anti-Ballistic Missile Treaty went into effect following ratification by both the United States and the Soviet Union, as did the Interim Agreement on Offensive Forces.
- Born: Lajon Witherspoon, American rock musician and singer, in Nashville, Tennessee

== October 4, 1972 (Wednesday) ==
- The abbreviation "Ms." was used for the first time in the Congressional Record, in reference to U.S. Representative Bella Abzug. The other eleven women in Congress, however, continued to be referred to as "Mrs."
- The first ABC Afterschool Special was telecast. The anthology drama series for children, shown once a month on a Wednesday afternoon, addressed contemporary issues and ran until 1997.
- Peter Bridge, a reporter for the defunct Newark Evening News went to jail for contempt of court for not revealing his source for a statement that the Newark Housing Authority had been offered a bribe. Bridge was the first journalist to be incarcerated after a June 29 U.S. Supreme Court ruling held that newsmen could not withhold confidential information from a grand jury investigation. Bridge would be released on October 24 after three weeks in the Essex County Jail, after a grand jury declined to return an indictment against anyone in the housing authority.

== October 5, 1972 (Thursday) ==
- In New York, the General Agreement on Participation was signed between the governments of oil exporters Saudi Arabia, Kuwait, Qatar and the United Arab Emirates on one side, and representatives of the petroleum producing corporations Exxon, Chevron, Texaco and Mobil. In return for a total of $500,000,000 a 25% interest in the Arab-American Company, Aramco, was sold by the oil companies to the four OPEC nations, with an objective of the national oil companies of each country acquiring a 51% ownership by 1983.
- In the first exhibition basketball game between the New York franchises of the rival NBA and ABA, the NBA's New York Knicks defeated the ABA's New York Nets, 117 to 88, at New Haven, Connecticut. The next night, the Knicks came to the Nets home court on Long Island and won again, 100 to 91. Both the Knicks and the Nets had been the runners-up in their respective leagues.
- Born: Grant Hill, American NBA player; in Dallas
- Died:
  - Ivan Yefremov, 64, Soviet paleontologist and science fiction author
  - Henry Dreyfuss, 68, designer of New York Central Railroad's "20th Century Limited" train

== October 6, 1972 (Friday) ==
- A train crash near Saltillo in Mexico killed 208 people and injured more than 700. The train, carrying more than 1,500 religious pilgrims, derailed near the bridge over the Moreno River. An engineer and four crewmen who survived were found to have been intoxicated, and were charged with homicide.
- Six schoolgirls, ranging in age from 5 to 11 years old, were kidnapped along with their teacher from their school at Faraday, Victoria. Parents arrived at the school to find a demand for one million Australian dollars (worth US$1,190,000 at the time). The seven escaped from an unguarded van the next day near Lancefield.
- Died: Solomon Lefschetz, 88, American mathematician who made major contributions to algebraic geometry, topology and differential equations.

== October 7, 1972 (Saturday) ==
- The National Hockey League's two expansion teams, the New York Islanders and the Atlanta Flames, played against each other for their first game to open the 1972-73 NHL season. Playing at the Nassau Coliseum before 12,221 the Flames won 3–2. Morris Stefaniw and Ed Westfall scored the first goals for the Flames and Islanders, respectively. The Islanders, who played on at Uniondale, New York, on Long Island, would finish their first season as the NHL's worst team, with a record of 12–60–6, but would later win the Stanley Cup four years in a row (from 1981 to 1984). The Flames, named for the burning of Atlanta during the American Civil War, would move to Calgary in 1980 and win the Stanley Cup in 1989.

== October 8, 1972 (Sunday) ==
- At the Paris Peace Talks, North Vietnam's negotiator, Lê Đức Thọ reached an agreement with Henry Kissinger of the United States on ending the Vietnam War. Demands were dropped for Nguyễn Văn Thiệu to step down as President of South Vietnam, but elections would be held there within six months, North Vietnamese troops would remain in the South, and the United States would recognize the sovereignty of North Vietnam. Kissinger envisioned signing the treaty on October 30, but Thieu's objections led to a breakdown in the agreement.
- In a nationally televised baseball game of the American League championship series, shortstop Bert Campaneris of the Oakland A's hurled his bat at pitcher Lerrin La Grow, after being struck by a wild pitch. "Campy" was barred from further postseason play and fined $500.
- Died: Prescott Bush, 77, U.S. Senator from Connecticut 1952–63, father and grandfather, respectively, of U.S. Presidents George H. W. Bush and George W. Bush.

== October 9, 1972 (Monday) ==
- Written by Gerome Ragni, who had scored a Broadway success with the musical Hair, the rock musical Dude: The Highway Life, opened at the Broadway Theatre, Dude was universally reviled by the critics and closed after 16 performances, having lost $800,000. Martin Gottfried described it as "incoherent, childish, and boring".
- Born: Etan Patz, American boy whose disappearance in 1979 remained a mystery for more than 30 years, in New York. In 2012, a man who had lived in the neighborhood would confess to the crime, although there was no physical evidence to corroborate his statement.
- Died: Miriam Hopkins, 69, American film and TV actress

== October 10, 1972 (Tuesday) ==
- With the headline "FBI Finds Nixon Aides Sabotaged Democrats", the Washington Post carried Carl Bernstein and Bob Woodward's revelation that the Watergate break-in was not an isolated incident, but part of a campaign by the White House. "The activities, according to information in FBI and Department of Justice files, were aimed at all the major Democratic presidential contenders", the investigative reporters noted, "and—since 1971—represented a basic strategy of the Nixon re-election effort."
- John Betjeman was appointed Poet Laureate of the United Kingdom.
- Born: Jun Lana, Filipino playwright and screenwriter, in Makati
- Died: Kenneth Edgeworth, 92, Irish astronomer

== October 11, 1972 (Wednesday) ==
- The case of Roe v. Wade was reargued before the United States Supreme Court, after having first been argued on December 13, 1971, before seven Justices. While the initial opinion by Justice Harry Blackmun had simply found the challenged laws against abortion to be "unconstitutionally vague", the revised 1973 Blackmun opinion went further in declaring most restrictions against the right of choice to be unconstitutitional. "Had the Blackmun first drafts in the abortion cases come down as the final decisions", notes one commentator, "American life and politics might have been quite different."
- The World Hockey Association opened its first season in Ottawa, Canada, as the Alberta Oilers defeated the Ottawa Nationals, 7–4, before a crowd of 5,006 and a Canadian national television audience. Ron Anderson of the Oilers scored the first WHA goal. The last WHA goal would be scored in 1979 by Dave Semenko of the Edmonton Oilers. The other WHA game of the night was in Ohio, where the Cleveland Crusaders beat the Quebec Nordiques, 2–0.
- Born: Claudia Black, Australian actress, in Sydney

== October 12, 1972 (Thursday) ==
- A brawl on board the aircraft carrier U.S.S. Kitty Hawk injured 46 people. About 100 black and white sailors fought for hours with knives, forks and chains, before the fight was broken up by a squad of U.S. Marines. Details were released six weeks afterward by the U.S. Navy. The fight began when a sailor asked for two sandwiches at the ship's mess hall and was given only one. Twenty-five men, only one of whom was white, were charged. Of those, 23 African-Americans would be convicted on charges of assault or allowed to plead to lesser offenses, with charges dismissed against one black sailor and the lone white sailor being acquitted after a court-martial.
- The Dai Gohonzon, inscribed by the Buddhist monk Nichiren (1222–1282) was placed at a special location, 693 years after its inscription. An object of veneration among Buddhists of the Nichiren Shōshū branch of Nichiren Buddhism, the Gohonzon had been inscribed on October 12, 1279, and was placed in the specially constructed Sho Hondo at Fujinomiya, Shizuoka, Japan.
- Troops from Portugal invaded the West African nation of Senegal, believed to be housing the rebel group Acção Revolucionária Armada (ARA), in an action condemned by the U.N. Security Council.

== October 13, 1972 (Friday) ==
- In the deadliest airline accident up to that time, a Soviet Aeroflot jet crashed during its third approach to Moscow on a flight from Leningrad, killing all 174 people on board.
- Uruguayan Air Force Flight 571, a Fairchild FH-227D passenger aircraft with 45 people on board, including the "Old Christians" rugby team, crashed into a mountain while flying from Montevideo to Santiago. Sixteen people survived for the next 72 days, and would be forced to resort to cannibalism to stay alive.

== October 14, 1972 (Saturday) ==
- A TV western with a Buddhist theme, Kung Fu premiered as a television series on the American ABC network and ran for three seasons.
- Last Tango in Paris, an X-rated film starring Marlon Brando and Maria Schneider, premiered at the New York Film Festival. Directed by Bernardo Bertolucci, it would become the seventh highest-grossing film of 1973 after its general release on January 27, 1973, despite being limited to moviegoers 17 and older.

== October 15, 1972 (Sunday) ==
- In the only verified example of an animal being killed by a meteorite, a cow was killed on a farm near Trujillo, Venezuela.
- Jackie Robinson made his last public appearance, throwing out the first pitch at Game 2 of the 1972 World Series, in Cincinnati. Before a national television audience, the first African-American to break Major League Baseball's color line 25 years earlier said "I am extremely proud and pleased", "but I'm going to be tremendously more pleased and proud when I look at that third base coaching line one day and see a Black face managing the ball club." Robinson, who had accepted MLB Commissioner Bowie Kuhn's invitation in return for a pledge to recruit African American managers, died nine days later.
- Died: An-An, 15, famed giant panda, died of old age at the Moscow Zoo.

== October 16, 1972 (Monday) ==
- At 8:59 a.m., a Cessna 310 took off from the airport at Anchorage, Alaska, for a 3½ hour trip to Juneau for a fundraiser. On board was Congressman Hale Boggs of Louisiana, Majority Leader of the U.S. House of Representatives and former member of the Warren Commission, as well as U.S. Representative Nick Begich of Alaska; Begich's aide, Russ Brown; and pilot Don Jonz, the owner of Pan Alaskan Airways. The men never arrived, and no trace of the plane nor its occupants was found after a massive search that ended on November 27, and their location remains unknown more than 50 years later.
- Direct deposit by electronic funds transfer made its debut, as a service of several California banks.
- At 10:30 pm in Rome, two agents of Israel's Mossad shot Wael Zwaiter eleven times as he returned to his apartment building. Zwaiter, suspected by Mossad to have been part of the Black September planning for the Munich massacre, was the first person killed as part of Mossad assassinations campaign.
- The British soap opera Emmerdale Farm, later simply Emmerdale, telecast its first episode.
- Ralph Perk, the Mayor of Cleveland, Ohio, accidentally set his hair on fire while using a welder's torch for a ribbon-cutting ceremony to open the 1972 American Society for Metals convention at the Cleveland Convention Center. The flames, caused by sparks igniting hair tonic used on him earlier in the day, were quickly put out and Mayor Perk sustained only superficial injuries, but a memorable photograph that was printed in newspapers throughout North America the next day. Perk commented afterward, "This job is more hazardous than I thought."
- Died: Leo G. Carroll, 85, English actor, best known as Alexander Waverly, the boss of U.N.C.L.E. on The Man from U.N.C.L.E.

== October 17, 1972 (Tuesday) ==
- The American Supplemental Security Income (SSI) program was approved by Congress, providing monthly social security benefits for disabled and aged persons who had not worked long enough to receive standard benefits from the Social Security Administration. The measure was a compromise, rejecting a proposal by President Nixon for a federal "Family Assistance Program" (FAP) that would have paid a minimum monthly amount to all households.
- Park Chung Hee, the President of South Korea, declared martial law nationwide, dissolved the National Assembly, and suspended the Constitution. Emergency rule was ended on December 13, but martial law would continue for more than ten years.
- In Norway, Lars Korvald formed a minority coalition government and became the new Prime Minister, even though his group of 16 ministers from his Kristelig Folkeparti (KFP or Christian People's Party), the Center Party and the Liberal Party held only 39 of the 155 seats in the unicameral parliament, the Storting. Prime Minister Trygve Bratteli, whose Norske arbeiderpartei (Norwegian Labour Party) had 74 seats, had resigned on September 26, along with the rest of his government after Norwegian voters had rejected his plan for entry into the Common Market.
- Born:
  - Eminem (stage name for Marshall Bruce Mathers III), American rapper; in St. Joseph, Missouri
  - Tarkan (stage name for Tarkan Tevetoğlu), Turkish pop singer; in Alzey, West Germany
- Died: George, Crown Prince of Serbia, 85. The eldest son of King Peter I, George had been forced to renounce his rights to the throne in favor of his younger brother, Alexander, who succeeded to the throne upon Peter's death in 1921

== October 18, 1972 (Wednesday) ==
- Both Houses of the U.S. Congress voted overwhelmingly to override President Nixon's veto of the Clean Water Act, enacting the $24.6 billion legislation into law. In the early morning, the Senate voted 52–12 for an override, and the House followed later in the day, 247–23. The same day The President confided in a telephone call with Charles Colson regarding the irresponsible nature of Congress in enacting an expensive bill the country could ill afford and the implications such as tax increases that would be necessary to meet the cost.
- The Soviet Union agreed to pay the United States $722,000,000 over a period of 30 years as repayment for American assistance made to the Soviets during World War II under the Lend-Lease Act.

== October 19, 1972 (Thursday) ==
- Kinshichi Kozuka and Hiroo Onoda, the last two members of a group of Japanese soldiers who had continued to fight the enemy since the end of the Second World War, set fire to a rice harvest on the Philippine island of Lubang, and then exchanged gunfire with local police. Kozuka was killed, leaving Onoda to fight the war alone. Onoda finally surrendered his sword to his original commanding officer in 1974.
- With the beginning of a three-day Paris summit meeting, the leaders of the nine members of the recently enlarged European Community came together for the first time.
- Died: Fred Keenor, Welsh football player (b. 1894)

== October 20, 1972 (Friday) ==
- The Buffalo Braves (later the Los Angeles Clippers) trailed the Boston Celtics, 103–60, at the end of three quarters, and then went on to set an NBA record, that still stands for scoring in one quarter, pouring in 58 points. The Braves still lost, albeit by only 8 points after trailing by 43; Final score: Boston 126, Buffalo 118.
- Born: Brian Schatz, American politician, U.S. Senator from Hawaii, in Ann Arbor, Michigan
- Died: Harlow Shapley, 86, American astronomer

== October 21, 1972 (Saturday) ==
- The Moro National Liberation Front began the first of many clashes with the government of the Philippines, with an attack on a police station in Marawi City and on Mindanao State University.
- Siad Barre, the President of Somalia, implemented a program to have the Somali language written using a standardized Latin alphabet in place of Arabic orthography, and, as part of a nationwide campaign against illiteracy, to make Somali the only official language for government and education. The last governmental changes of orthography had been in the Soviet Union in 1940 (from Latin script to Cyrillic for the Tajik language), and in Turkey in 1928 (from Arabic to Latin script for the Turkish language).

== October 22, 1972 (Sunday) ==
- As Rollie Fingers retired the side in the ninth inning, the Oakland A's beat the Cincinnati Reds, 3–2, to win Game 7 of the 1972 World Series.
- In Saigon, Henry Kissinger and South Vietnamese President Nguyễn Văn Thiệu met to discuss a proposed cease-fire in the Vietnam War, already discussed between Americans and North Vietnamese in Paris.
- Stranded deep in the Andes on the border of Argentina and Chile without supplies, the remaining survivors of the crash of Uruguayan Air Force Flight 571 made the decision to eat the corpses of those who had already died.

== October 23, 1972 (Monday) ==
- The United States halted bombing of North Vietnam above the 20th parallel, bringing to a close Operation Linebacker after nearly six months.
- The musical Pippin, with music and lyrics by Stephen Schwartz, directed by Bob Fosse, and based on a book by Roger O. Hirson, began its run at the Imperial Theatre on Broadway, and went on for 1,944 performances. The production was based on the life of Pepin the Hunchback (769–811), the son of Charlemagne.
- At Johns Hopkins University in the United States, Dr. Solomon H. Snyder and his assistant, Candace Pert, made the critical discovery that the receptors for opiates were in each brain cell, and the search began for opiate substances within the body, later called enkephalins.

== October 24, 1972 (Tuesday) ==
- Anwar Sadat, President of Egypt, convened a meeting of his armed forces leaders and announced plans to prepare for a limited war with Israel. In August, Sadat had instructed his Minister of War, Field Marshal Muhammad Sadeq to prepare a war plan by October 1. As Sadat related in a memoir later, "At that meeting, I was surprised to find out that Fieldmarshal Sadeq had not reported to the Supreme Council what had ordered him to ... I saw at that meeting one of the military commanders, who was in charge of logistics, raising his hand and askwing what was the decision I was talking about." Sadeq was fired four days later. The attack on Israeli positions in the Sinai Peninsula, known as the Yom Kippur War, would eventually take place on October 6, 1973.
- Japan's most powerful crime boss, Yoshio Kodama, negotiated a peace agreement between leaders of the various Japanese organized crime syndicates (yakuza), bringing an end to years of bloodshed between the gangs by setting up specific territories in Tokyo and Yokohama for each group.
- The United States "Act for the Protection of Foreign Officials and Official Guests of the United States" (18 U.S.C. §112) was signed into law. Prior to crimes against foreign diplomats being made a federal offense, jurisdiction had been a matter of the law of the state where the act took place.
- Died:
  - Jackie Robinson, 53, American baseball player who broke the color line in 1947, of a heart attack
  - Claire Windsor, 80, American film actress

== October 25, 1972 (Wednesday) ==
- In its continuing investigation of the Watergate scandal, the Washington Post reported that White House Chief of Staff H. R. Haldeman was the fifth person to control a secret cash fund designed to finance illegal political sabotage and espionage during the 1972 presidential election campaign. which was denied by the White House the sameday.
- Died: Johnny Mantz, 54, who won the first Southern 500 stock car race, but no other major races, was killed in a highway accident when he apparently fell asleep while driving to his home in Ojai, California.

== October 26, 1972 (Thursday) ==
- "We believe that peace is at hand", American presidential advisor Henry Kissinger announced to the world. Eleven days before the U.S. presidential election, said that the United States and North Vietnam had come to a basic agreement on ending the long running Vietnam War. Privately, President Nixon was outraged at his advisor's unauthorized statement, which Nixon saw as an attempt to take exclusive credit as a peacemaker. Kissinger, on the other hand, noted that North Vietnam had published the text of the agreement and a response was necessary. As it turned out, peace was not quite at hand and a final agreement was not signed until early 1973.
- General Mathieu Kérékou staged a coup in Dahomey, overthrowing the Presidential Council that had governed the West African nation since 1970. Kérékou changed the nation's name to the People's Republic of Benin as part of a movement toward Marxism–Leninism, but later guided the nation toward democracy.
- Britain's Local Government Act 1972, a comprehensive reform in local governments in England and Wales, was given royal assent by Queen Elizabeth II, reforming numerous historic counties and eliminating two-thirds of local government councils. The law, which would take full effect on April 1, 1974, affected 52 counties (39 in England and 13 in Wales), which became 45 (six metropolitan counties and 39 non-metropolitan counties).
- Born: Hamdi Ulukaya, Turkish-Kurdish businessman and activist, founder of Chobani, in Erzincan (official birth date)
- Died: Igor Sikorsky, 83, aviation pioneer who developed the helicopter.

== October 27, 1972 (Friday) ==
- The Consumer Product Safety Act was signed into law in the United States.
- Mariner 9 was switched off after having transmitted 7,329 images since its arrival into orbit (November 13, 1971) over the planet Mars.
- Air Inter Flight 696 crashed while attempting a landing in Loire, France, killing 60 of the 68 people on board.
- Jackie Robinson His funeral was in upper Manhattan.
- Elton John's single "Crocodile Rock" was released, and would become his first No. 1 hit by February.
- Born: Maria de Lurdes Mutola, Mozambican athlete, women's 800 meter world champion, in Lourenço Marques (now Maputo)

== October 28, 1972 (Saturday) ==
- The Airbus A300, the first wide-body twin engine airliner, made its first test flight, taking off from and landing at the Toulouse–Blagnac Airport in France, and flown for 85 minutes by pilot Max Fischl and co-pilot Bernard Ziegler. The popular carrier, capable of carrying up to 247 passengers, would be introduced to commercial service on May 23, 1974.
- North Yemen (the Yemen Arab Republic) and South Yemen (the People's Democratic Republic of Yemen) signed an agreement in Egypt to end fighting between the two nations and to eventually unite. Union would take place in 1990.
- Born:
  - Terrell Davis, American NFL player, in San Diego, California
  - Brad Paisley, American country singer-songwriter, in Glen Dale, West Virginia.
- Died: Mitchell Leisen, 74, American film director

== October 29, 1972 (Sunday) ==
- Lufthansa Flight 615 was hijacked by terrorists who demanded the release of the three surviving perpetrators of the Munich massacre. The West German authorities accepted the demands, much to the chagrin of Israel.
- In Houston, four fugitive bank robbers broke through airport security, killed ticket agent Stanley Hubbard, and then fought their way onto an Eastern Airlines jet, Flight 496, which they then hijacked to Cuba.
- U.S. President Richard Nixon sent a communique to President Thieu of South Vietnam urging him to work with the U.S. "to achieve our mutual objectives of peace and unity for the heroic people of South Vietnam."
- Born:
  - Tracee Ellis Ross, American TV actress (Black-ish, Girlfriends), in Los Angeles
  - Gabrielle Union, American film and TV actress (City of Angels), in Omaha
  - Takafumi Horie, Japanese internet entrepreneur who founded the now-defunct site Livedoor; in Yame, Fukuoka

== October 30, 1972 (Monday) ==
- In the closest election for the House of Commons in Canada's history, Prime Minister Pierre Trudeau's Liberal Party had 109 seats, while Robert Stanfield's Progressive Conservatives had 107. In Ontario (federal electoral district), Norman Cafik (Lib.) defeated Frank Charles McGee (PC) by a margin of only four votes (16,328 to 16,324). The New Democrats won 31 seats (two of them over the PC by margins of less than thirty votes), and the Social Credit Party (15). Trudeau was able to stay in power even without a majority.
- At 7:35 a.m., a commuter train collision in Chicago killed 45 people and injured about 350 others at the 27th Street Station.
- Don Rogers was signed by Crystal Palace FC, which paid Swindon Town £147,000 for his services. He would go on to play 83 games for Palace scoring 30 goals, including two in a 5–0 rout of Manchester United on December 16.

== October 31, 1972 (Tuesday) ==
- In the last major loss of American life in the Vietnam War, 22 servicemen were killed when their Chinook helicopter was shot down by a heat seeking missile.
- Born: Matt Dawson, English national rugby union team player, in Birkenhead
