= Left of center =

Left of center may refer to:

- Left of Center (album), released in 2006 by Javier Colon
- "Left of Center" (Suzanne Vega song), a 1986 song by Suzanne Vega
- Left of Center (Turkey), a political ideology in Turkey

== See also ==
- Centre-left politics, a political view in left–right politics
- Left-wing politics, a second political view
