= New Democratic Front =

New Democratic Front is a name given to several political parties. It may refer to:

- New Democratic Front (Sri Lanka), a Sri Lankan political party
- New Democratic Front (Botswana), a Botswana political party
