= New Democracy (mural) =

Mural by David Alfaro Siqueiros

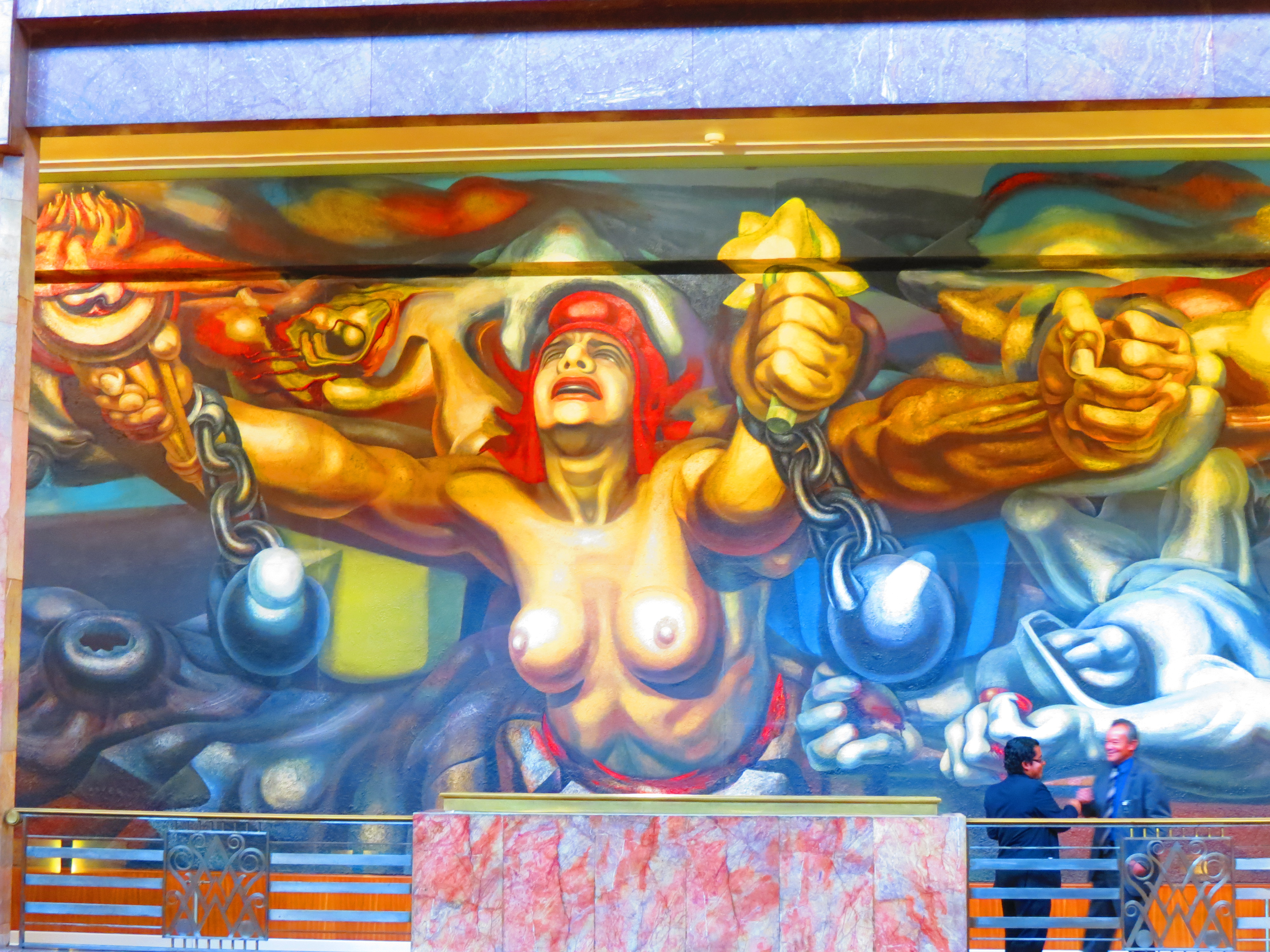
Mexico for Democracy and Independence (1944)

New Democracy (Spanish: Nueva Democracia) is a triptych mural created by Mexican artist David Alfaro Siqueiros, and inaugurated in 1944 and 1945. The mural was created using an automotive paint known as pyroxylin. It is held in the Palacio de Bellas Artes, in Mexico City.

== History ==
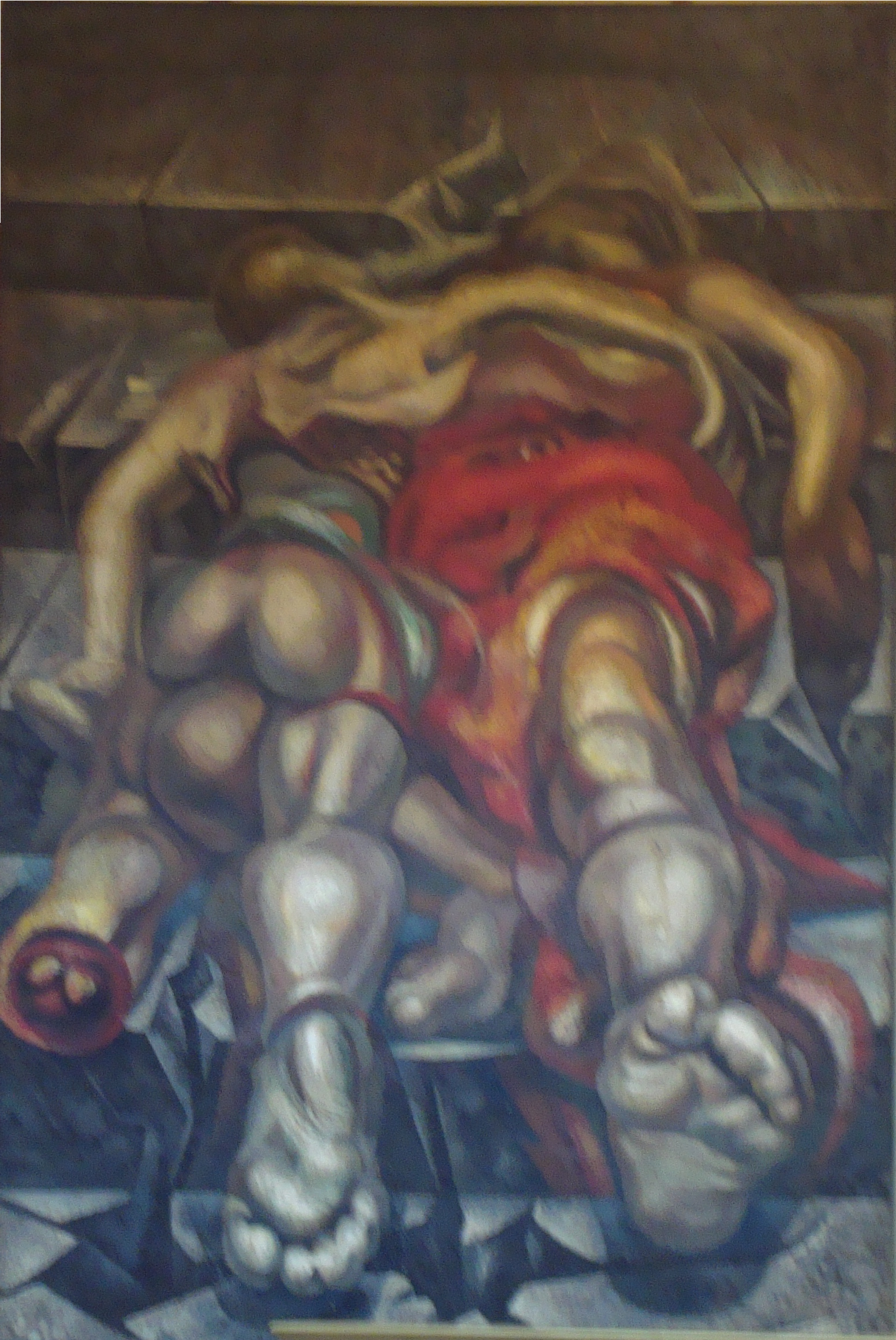
Victims of War (1945)

In 1944, the Palace of Fine Arts commissioned Siqueiros to paint a mural inside the building to commemorate the anniversary of the 1910 Mexican Revolution. The central panel, originally titled Mexico for Democracy and Independence, was inaugurated on November 20, 1944. A year later, in 1945, Siqueiros added two more panels, Victims of War and Victims of Fascism, commemorating the Allied victory over the Axis powers during the World War II, thus forming the triptych known today as New Democracy.

== Description and analysis ==
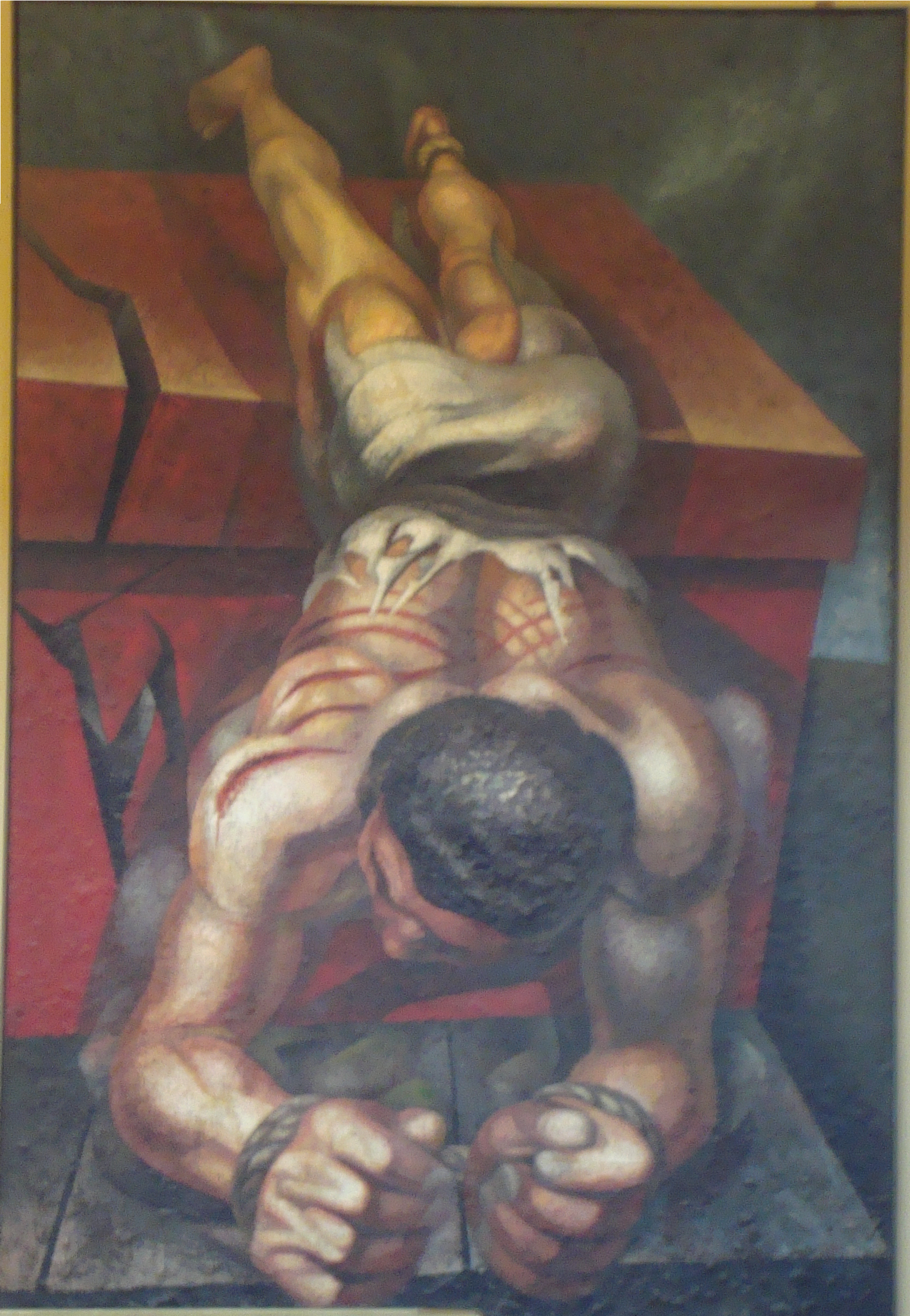
Victims of Fascism (1945)

The mural of the centre depicts a chained androgynous looking woman with a bare torso and outstretched arms. She represents a free humankind. The model for the mural was Angélica Arenal, Siqueiros' wife. Raquel Tuccayas interpreted this scene as liberation from oppression, also noting that the yellow flower that the woman carries symbolizes science and art, and the torch represents the birth of a new indigenism: the new fire. The woman wears a Phrygian cap, an emblem of liberty in the French Revolution; from the woman's rib emerges another arm, a clenched fist, representing the triumph over fascism, and below, it can be seen a dead German soldier.

The panel on the left, Victims of War, depicts the violence of war on two severed bodies: the dead man, the victim of war, fallen with his swords among human remains.

On the right side, there is a scene depicting a man with his hands tied, showing signs of torture, lying face down, an image that has been interpreted as a man enslaved by ideology.
