= New Democratic Party of Quebec =

New Democratic Party of Quebec or Nouveau Parti démocratique du Québec may refer to:

- New Democratic Party of Quebec (1963), a Canadian provincial political party which served as the Quebec section of the federal New Democratic Party before disaffiliating from the federal party in 1991 and adopting the name Parti de la démocratie socialiste in 1994
- Quebec section of the New Democratic Party, a wing of the Canadian federal political party
- New Democratic Party of Quebec (2014), a distinct Canadian provincial political party founded as a revival of the party established in 1963
