= List of common names of political parties =

This list of common names of political parties includes only commonly used names for political parties, not overviews or general definitions of common parties such as liberal or green parties.

- Action Party
  - National Action Party
  - People's Action Party
- Agrarian Party
- Alliance Party
  - National Alliance
  - New Alliance Party
- American Party
- Blue Party
- Centre Party
- Christian Party
  - Christian Democratic Party and Christian Democratic Union
  - Christian People's Party
- Civic Party
  - Civic Democratic Party
- Colorado Party
- Communist Party and Communist League
  - International Communist League
  - Revolutionary Communist League
  - Worker-Communist Party
  - Revolutionary Communist Party
- Conservative Party
  - Conservative People's Party
- Constitution Party
- Democratic Party and Democratic Alliance
  - Christian Democratic Party and Christian Democratic Union
  - Civic Democratic Party
  - Union of Democratic Forces
  - Free Democratic Party
  - Democratic Labour Party
  - Liberal Democratic Party
  - National Democratic Party and National Democratic Congress
  - New Democratic Party
  - Democratic People's Party
  - Progressive Democratic Party
  - Radical Democratic Party
  - Social Democratic Party
  - Social Democratic Union
  - Democratic Socialist Party
  - United Democratic Party
- Equality Party
- Fascist Party
- Fatherland Party and Fatherland Union
  - Union of Democratic Forces
  - Free Democratic Party
- First Party
- Freedom Party
- Green Party
- Independence Party
- International
  - Industrial Workers of the World
- Justice Party
- Labour Party
  - Socialist Labour Party
- Left Party
  - United Left
- Liberal Party
  - Liberal Democratic Party
  - National Liberal Party
  - Radical Liberal Party
  - Social Liberal Party
- Libertarian Party
- Liberty Party
- Moderate Party
- Motherland Party
- National Party, National Front and National Congress
  - National Alliance
  - National Democratic Party and National Democratic Congress
  - National Liberal Party
  - New National Party
  - National Progressive Party
  - National Socialist Party
  - National Unity Party
- New Party
  - New Alliance Party
  - New Democratic Party
  - New National Party
- People's Party and People's Alliance
  - Christian People's Party
  - Conservative People's Party
  - Democratic People's Party
  - Liberal People's Party
  - National People's Party
  - Republican People's Party
- Popular Party and Popular Alliance
  - National Popular Party
- Pirate Party
- Progressive Party
  - Progressive Democratic Party
- Radical Party
  - Radical Democratic Party
  - Left Radical Party
- Red Party
- Reform Party
  - Liberal Reform Party
  - National Reform Party
- Republican Party
  - National Republican Party
- Revolutionary Party
  - Revolutionary Communist Party
- Social Democratic Party
  - Social Democratic Union
- Socialist Party
  - Democratic Socialist Party
  - Socialist Labour Party
  - National Socialist Party
  - Socialist Workers Party
- Unionist Party
- Unity Party, United Party
  - United Left
  - National Unity Party
  - United Democratic Party
  - United Workers' Party
- Workers' Party
  - Socialist Workers' Party
  - United Workers' Party
  - Worker-Communist Party
  - Workers' League
