= National Party =

National Party or Nationalist Party may refer to:

== Active parties ==
- a category of political party in India
- National Party of Australia, commonly known as The Nationals
- Bangladesh:
  - Bangladesh Nationalist Party
  - Jatiya Party (Ershad) a.k.a. National Party (Ershad)
- California National Party
- Nationalist Party of Canada
- Kuomintang or Chinese Nationalist Party, in mainland China (1919–1949) and Taiwan (since 1949)
- National Party (Denmark)
- National Party (Ireland)
- National Party of Honduras
- Hong Kong National Party
- Homeland Party (Libya) or Libyan National Party
- Basotho National Party, in Lesotho
- Nationalist Party (Malta)
- Frisian National Party, in the Netherlands
- New Zealand National Party
- Pakistan:
  - Awami National Party
  - Balochistan National Party (Mengal)
  - National Party (Pakistan)
  - Kalat State National Party
- National Party (Papua New Guinea)
- Nacionalista Party, in the Philippines
- Plaid Genedlaethol Cymru or The National Party of Wales
- Scottish National Party
- Seychelles National Party
- Slovak National Party
- Slovenian National Party
- National Party (Solomon Islands)
- National Party South Africa
- Basque Nationalist Party, in Spain
- National Party of Suriname
- Nationalist Movement Party, in Turkey
- British National Party
- National Party (Uruguay)
- Việt Nam Quốc Dân Đảng or Vietnamese Nationalist Party (founded 1927, in exile since 1975)
- National Party (Zambia)

== Former parties ==
- Australia:
  - Nationalist Party of Australia (1917–1931)
  - National Party (South Australia) (1917–1923)
- National Party (Belize)
- Nationalist Party (Bolivia)
- Burma:
  - Nationalist Party (Burma) (1920s)
  - Nationalist Party (1930s)
- Canada:
  - National Party of Canada
  - National Party of Canada (1979)
  - Parti National (Quebec)
  - Parti nationaliste du Québec
- Chile:
  - National Party (Chile, 1857) (1857–1933)
  - National Party (Chile, 1966) (1966–94)
- National Party (Colombia)
- Czech Republic:
  - National Party (1848–1918), known as Old Czech Party
  - National Party (Czech Republic)
- Breton National Party, in France
- Germany:
  - National Party of Germany
  - New National Party (Germany)
- Liberal Party of Gibraltar (founded 1991 as Gibraltar National Party)
- Grenada:
  - The National Party
  - Grenada National Party
- Nationalist Party (Iceland)
- Ireland:
  - Nationalist Party (Ireland)
  - National Group
  - Catholic Democrats (Ireland) (1995)
- Isle of Man:
  - National Party (Isle of Man)
  - Manx National Party (1977–1981)
- National Party (Japan)
- Malaysia:
  - Sarawak National Party
  - Parti Negara
- Nationalist Party (Peru)
- Poland:
  - National Party (Poland)
  - National Party (Poland, 1989)
  - National Party "Fatherland"
- Puerto Rican Nationalist Party
- National Party (Romania)
- West Indies National Party, in Saint Vincent and the Grenadines
- Solomon Islands Liberal Party a.k.a. Nationalist Party
- South Africa:
  - National Party (South Africa) (1914–1997)
  - New National Party (South Africa) (1997–2005)
- National Party (Sweden)
- National Party (Syria)
- Thai Nation Party
- United Kingdom:
  - British National Party (1960)
  - Cornish Nationalist Party
  - English National Party
  - National Party (UK, 1917)
  - National Party (UK, 1976)
  - Nationalist Party (Northern Ireland)
  - National Party of Scotland
  - National Party of Europe
  - Vectis National Party
- National Party (United States)

== See also ==
- Nation Party (disambiguation)
- Nationalist Party (disambiguation)
- National Front (disambiguation) and National Front Party (disambiguation)
- New National Party (disambiguation)
- Democratic National Party (disambiguation)
- Independent National Party (disambiguation)
- National Action Party (disambiguation)
- National Democratic Party (disambiguation)
- National Labour Party (disambiguation)
- National Liberal Party (disambiguation)
- National People's Party (disambiguation)
- National Popular Party (disambiguation)
- National Progressive Party (disambiguation)
- National Unity Party (disambiguation)
- National Workers Party (disambiguation)
- Peoples National Party (disambiguation)
- People's Party (disambiguation)
