= Homeland (disambiguation) =

A homeland is a territory considered by an ethnic group to be its country of origin.

Homeland may also refer to:

== Arts and entertainment ==
- Homeland (video game), a 2005 role-playing game

=== Film ===
- Homeland (film), a 2014 Japanese drama
- Homeland: Iraq Year Zero, a 2015 documentary film

=== Literature ===
- Homeland (Doctorow novel), by Cory Doctorow, 2013
- Homeland (Forgotten Realms novel), by R. A. Salvatore, 1990
- Homeland and Other Stories, a short story collection by Barbara Kingsolver

=== Music ===
- Homeland (Laurie Anderson album), 2010
- Homeland (Miriam Makeba album), 2000
- The Homeland, an album by Bobby Conn and the Glass Gypsies, 2004
- Homeland, an album by Tish Hinojosa, 1989
- "Homeland" (song), by Kenny Rogers, 2001
- "Homeland", a composition by Z. Randall Stroope
- "Homeland", a song by Nolwenn Leroy, 2012

=== Nonfiction ===
- Homeland (Maharidge book), 2004 book by Dale Maharidge and photographer Michael Williamson

=== Television ===
- Homeland (TV series), an American spy thriller series
- Homeland (Chinese TV series), a 2019 military drama series
- Rodina (TV series) (Homeland), a 2015 Russian political thriller series

== Places in the United States ==
- Homeland, California
- Homeland, Florida
- Homeland, Georgia
- Homeland, Baltimore, Maryland
- Homeland, Missouri

== Other uses ==
- Homeland Party (disambiguation), several political parties
- Homeland (linguistics)
- Homeland (political alliance), a 2014 electoral alliance in Republika Srpska
- Homeland (political party), a Slovak political party
- Homeland (supermarket), an American supermarket chain
- Bantustan, or homeland, a territory for black inhabitants of South Africa and South West Africa during apartheid
- Generation Z, or the Homeland Generation, the generation following the Millennials
- Outstation (Aboriginal community), Australia, also known as a homeland

== See also ==
- Fatherland (disambiguation)
- Heimat
- Homelands (disambiguation)
- Motherland (disambiguation)
- Outstation movement, an Indigenous Australian movement also known as homeland movement
- Patria (disambiguation)
