= Clerical fascism =

Ideology combining fascism and clericalism

Clerical fascism (also clero-fascism or clerico-fascism) is an ideology that combines the political and economic doctrines of fascism with clericalism. The term has been used to describe organizations and movements that combine religious elements with fascism, receive support from religious organizations which espouse sympathy for fascism, or fascist regimes in which clergy play a leading role.

A core distinction separating clerical fascism from other forms of right-wing Catholic politics is that it requires the fascist polity to be subordinated to the moral and social doctrines of the Catholic Church, explicitly affirming the Church's primacy over the state's ideological goals. This differentiates it from movements where Catholic support is merely tactical or secondary.

When coined in 1920s Italy, the term referred to the political ideology of the Roman Catholic Italian People's Party which supported Benito Mussolini and his fascist regime. The term was also used for Catholics in Northern Italy who advocated a synthesis of Roman Catholicism and fascism.

== History ==
The term clerical fascism (clero-fascism or clerico-fascism) emerged in the early 1920s in the Kingdom of Italy, referring to the faction of the Roman Catholic Partito Popolare Italiano (PPI) which supported Benito Mussolini and his regime. It was supposedly coined by Don Luigi Sturzo, a priest and Christian democrat leader who opposed Mussolini and went into exile in 1924, although the term had also been used before Mussolini's March on Rome in 1922 to refer to Catholics in Northern Italy who advocated a synthesis of Roman Catholicism and fascism.

Sturzo made a distinction between the "filofascists", who left the Catholic PPI in 1921 and 1922, and the "clerical fascists" who stayed in the party after the March on Rome, advocating collaboration with the fascist government. Eventually, the latter group converged with Mussolini, abandoning the PPI in 1923 and creating the Centro Nazionale Italiano. The PPI was disbanded by the fascist regime in 1926.

The term has since been used by scholars seeking to contrast authoritarian-conservative clerical fascism with more radical variants. Christian fascists focus on internal religious politics, such as passing laws and regulations that reflect their view of Christianity. Radicalized forms of Christian fascism or clerical fascism (clero-fascism or clerico-fascism) were emerging on the far-right of the political spectrum in some European countries during the interwar period in the first half of the 20th century.

=== Fascist Italy ===
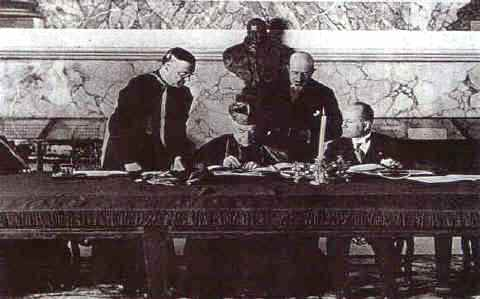
Mussolini (far right) signing the Lateran Treaty (Vatican City, 11 February 1929)

In 1870, the newly formed Kingdom of Italy annexed the remaining Papal States, depriving the Pope of his temporal power. However, in the 1929 Lateran Treaty, Mussolini recognized the Pope as Sovereign of Vatican City State, and Roman Catholicism became the state religion of Fascist Italy.

In March 1929, a nationwide plebiscite was held to publicly endorse the Lateran Treaty. Opponents were intimidated by the fascist regime: the organisation Catholic Action (Azione Cattolica) and Mussolini claimed that "no" votes were of those "few ill-advised anti-clericals who refuse to accept the Lateran Pacts". Nearly nine million Italians voted, or 90 per cent of the registered electorate, with only 136,000 voting "no".

Almost immediately after the signing of the Treaty, relations between Mussolini and the Church soured again. Mussolini "referred to Catholicism as, in origin, a minor sect that had spread beyond Historical Palestine only because grafted onto the organization of the Roman empire." After the concordat, "he confiscated more issues of Catholic newspapers in the next three months than in the previous seven years." Mussolini reportedly came close to being excommunicated from the Church around this time.

In 1938, the Italian Racial Laws and Manifesto of Race were promulgated by the fascist regime to persecute Italian Jews as well as Protestant Christians, especially Evangelicals and Pentecostals. Thousands of Italian Jews and a small number of Protestants died in the Nazi concentration camps.

Despite Mussolini's close alliance with Hitler's Germany, Italy did not fully adopt Nazism's genocidal ideology towards the Jews. The Nazis were frustrated by the Italian authorities' refusal to co-operate in roundups of Jews, and no Jews were deported prior to the formation of the Italian Social Republic following the Armistice of Cassibile. In the Italian-occupied Independent State of Croatia, German envoy Siegfried Kasche advised Berlin that Italian forces had "apparently been influenced" by Vatican opposition to German anti-Semitism. As anti-Axis feeling grew in Italy, the use of Vatican Radio to broadcast papal disapproval of race murder and anti-Semitism angered the Nazis. When Mussolini and his regime were overthrown in July 1943, the Germans moved to occupy Italy and commenced a roundup of Jews.

Around 4% of Resistance forces were formally Catholic organisations, but Catholics dominated other "independent groups" such as the Fiamme Verdi and Osoppo partisans, and there were also Catholic militants in the Garibaldi Brigades, such as Benigno Zaccagnini, who later served as a prominent Christian Democrat politician. In Northern Italy, tensions between Catholics and communists in the movement led Catholics to form the Fiamme Verdi as a separate brigade of Christian Democrats. After the war, ideological divisions between former partisans re-emerged, becoming a hallmark of post-war Italian politics.

== Examples of clerical fascism ==
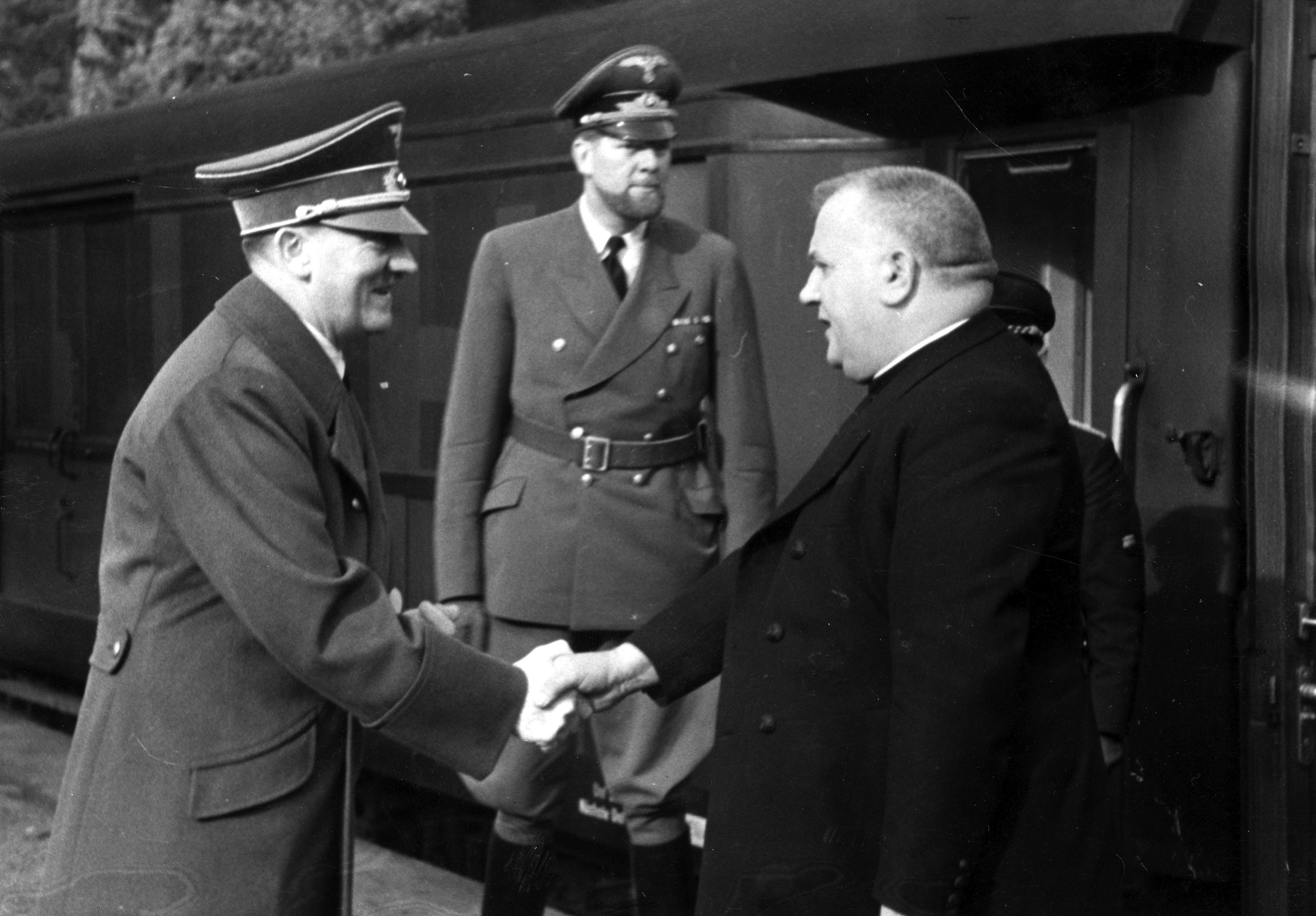
Roman Catholic priest Jozef Tiso (right), who was president of the Slovak Republic, a client state of Nazi Germany

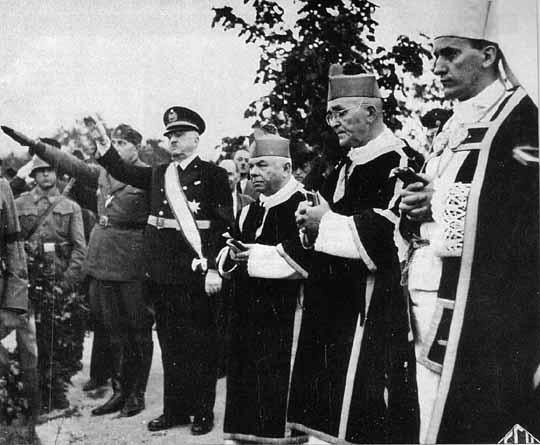
Catholic prelates led by Archbishop Aloysius Stepinac at the funeral of Marko Došen, one of the senior Ustaše leaders, in September 1944

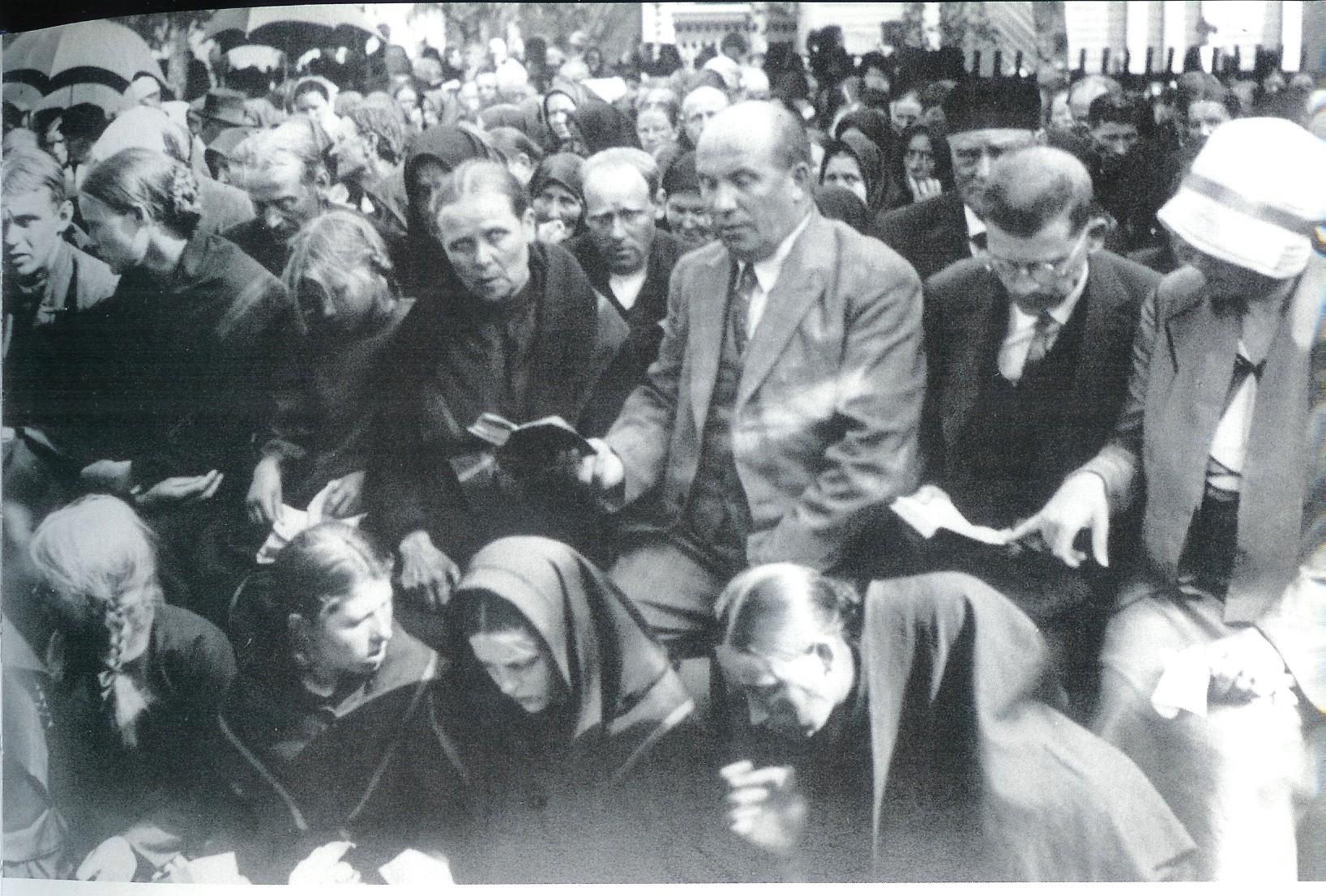
Lapua Movement members praying, Vihtori Kosola in the middle

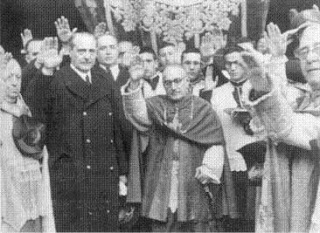
Francoist minister Esteban Bilbao (left) and Catholic archbishop Enrique Pla y Deniel (center) doing the Fascist salute in Toledo Cathedral, Spain, March 1942

Examples of political movements which incorporate certain elements of clerical fascism into their ideologies include:

- the Fatherland Front in Austria led by Austrian Catholic Chancellors Engelbert Dollfuss and Kurt Schuschnigg.
- the Rexist Party in Belgium led by Léon Degrelle, a Belgian Catholic.
- the Brazilian Integralist Action in Brazil led by Brazilian Catholic Plínio Salgado.
- the Nationalist Liberation Alliance in Argentina led by Juan Queraltó.
- the Ustaše movement led by Poglavnik and Prime Minister Ante Pavelić in the Independent State of Croatia and its supporters in the Croatian Catholic Church.
- the ZBOR movement led by Dimitrije Ljotić in the Nedic's Serbia, heavily supported by Nikolaj Velimirović and Serbian Orthodox Church
- the Slovak People's Party (Ľudaks) in Slovakia led by President Jozef Tiso, a Catholic priest.
- the FET y de las JONS of Spain led by Spanish Catholic Francisco Franco, which developed into National Catholicism.
- the Lapua Movement and the Patriotic People's Movement (IKL) in Finland led by the Lutherans (körtti) Vihtori Kosola and Vilho Annala respectively. Pastor Elias Simojoki led the IKL's youth organization the Blue-and-Blacks.
- the German Christians of the Nazi Party in Nazi Germany led by Ludwig Müller which attempted but failed to unify German Protestants during the Kirchenkampf.
- Metaxism and the 4th of August Regime in Greece which was led by Ioannis Metaxas and heavily supported the Greek Orthodox Church.
- the National Synarchist Union in Mexico led by Mexican Catholic José Antonio Urquiza before his assassination in 1938, it was a revival of the Catholic reaction that triggered the Cristero War; midcentury, the movement would become the focus of a conspiracy theory which alleged that it had infiltrated various institutions under the name El Yunque.
- the National Radical Camp in Poland led by Boleslaw Piasecki, Henryk Rossman, Tadeusz Gluzinski and Jan Mosdorf which heavily incorporated Polish Catholicism into its Falangist faction.
- the National-Christian Defense League/Iron Guard of Romania, which was led by the devoutly Romanian Orthodox Corneliu Zelea Codreanu.
- Serbian Action, an ultranationalist and clerical fascist movement, active in Serbia since 2010.
- the Silver Legion of America in the United States led by William Dudley Pelley which combined American Christianity (specifically Protestantism) with American white nationalism.

The National Union in Portugal led by Prime Ministers António de Oliveira Salazar and Marcelo Caetano is not considered Fascist by historians such as Stanley G. Payne, Thomas Gerard Gallagher, Juan José Linz, António Costa Pinto, Roger Griffin, Robert Paxton and Howard J. Wiarda, though it is considered Fascist by historians such as Manuel de Lucena, Jorge Pais de Sousa, Manuel Loff, and Hermínio Martins. One of Salazar's actions was to ban the National Syndicalists/Fascists. Salazar distanced himself from fascism and Nazism, which he criticized as a "pagan Caesarism" that did not recognise either legal or moral limits.

Francoist Spain is often cited as a critical example of clerical fascism, defined by the official state ideology of Nacionalcatolicismo (National Catholicism). This ideology was instrumental in restoring the political and social hegemony of the Catholic Church over all aspects of Spanish public life, including education, censorship, and family law.

The Croatian Ustaše regime, which ruled the Independent State of Croatia (NDH), is often cited as the most extreme manifestation of clerical fascism. The regime was characterized by a potent fusion of Croatian nationalism, fascism, and militant Catholicism, which was essential to enabling its brutal program of genocide against Serbs, Jews, and Roma.

Likewise, the Fatherland Front in Austria led by Austrian Catholic Chancellors Engelbert Dollfuss and Kurt Schuschnigg is often not regarded as a fully fascist party. It has been called semi-Fascist and even imitation Fascist. The regime is a key example of a Christian Corporatist State, known as the Ständestaat. The system explicitly modeled its authoritarian political and social structure on Catholic teachings. Dollfuss was murdered by the Nazis, shot in his office by the SS and left to bleed to death. Initially, his regime received support from Fascist Italy, which formed the Stresa Front with the United Kingdom and France.

The distinctive economic model used by these states, corporatism, sought to replace liberal capitalism and class conflict with state-supervised vocational corporations. This "Third Way" economic and social system was justified by the principles outlined in the papal encyclicals Rerum Novarum and Quadragesimo Anno, which advocated for a socio-economic order based on Catholic doctrine.

=== Use of the term ===
Scholars who accept the use of the term clerical fascism debate about which of the listed examples should be dubbed "clerical fascist", with the Ustaše being the most widely included example. In the examples which are cited above, the degree of official Catholic support and the degree of clerical influence over lawmaking and government both vary. Moreover, several authors reject the concept of a clerical fascist régime, arguing that an entire fascist régime does not become "clerical" if elements of the clergy support it, while others are not prepared to use the term "clerical fascism" outside the context of what they call the fascist epoch, between the ends of the two world wars (1918–1945).

Some scholars consider certain contemporary movements forms of clerical fascism, such as Christian Identity and Christian Reconstructionism in the United States; "the most virulent form" of Islamic fundamentalism, Islamism; and Hindutva in India.

The political theorist Roger Griffin warns against the "hyperinflation of clerical fascism". According to Griffin, the use of the term "clerical fascism" should be limited to "the peculiar forms of politics that arise when religious clerics and professional theologians are drawn either into collusion with the secular ideology of fascism (an occurrence particularly common in interwar Europe); or, more rarely, manage to mix a theologically illicit cocktail of deeply held religious beliefs with a fascist commitment to saving the nation or race from decadence or collapse". Griffin adds that "clerical fascism" "should never be used to characterize a political movement or a regime in its entirety, since it can at most be a faction within fascism", while he defines fascism as "a revolutionary, secular variant of ultranationalism bent on the total rebirth of society through human agency".

In the case of the Slovak State, some scholars have rejected the use of the term clerical fascism as a label for the regime and they have particularly rejected the use of the term clerical fascist as a label for Jozef Tiso.

== See also ==
- Alois Hudal
- Catholic Church and Nazi Germany
- Christian Nationalism
- Christofascism
- Clerical philosophers
- Hindu nationalism
- Hindutva
- Islamofascism
- Kahanism
- National Union (Italy, 1923)
- Para-fascism
- Positive Christianity
- Proto-fascism
- Religious nationalism
- Ratlines (World War II aftermath)

== Bibliography ==
- Walter K. Andersen. "Bharatiya Janata Party: Searching for the Hindu Nationalist Face", in The New Politics of the Right: Neo-Populist Parties and Movements in Established Democracies, ed. Hans-Georg Betz and Stefan Immerfall (New York: St. Martin's Press, 1998), pp. 219–232. ISBN 0-312-21134-1; ISBN 0-312-21338-7.
- Stefan Arvidsson. Aryan Idols: The Indo-European Mythology as Ideology and Science. (University of Chicago Press, 2006). ISBN 0-226-02860-7.
- Partha Banerjee, In the Belly of the Beast: The Hindu Supremacist RSS and BJP of India (Delhi, India: Ajanta, 1998). OCLC 43318775
- Biondich, Mark (2005). "Religion and Nation in Wartime Croatia: Reflections on the Ustaša Policy of Forced Religious Conversions, 1941–1942". The Slavonic and East European Review. 83 (1): 71–116. doi:10.1353/see.2005.0063. JSTOR 4214049. S2CID 151704526.
- Biondich, Mark (2007a). "Controversies Surrounding the Catholic Church in Wartime Croatia, 1941–45". The Independent State of Croatia 1941–45. Routledge. pp. 31–59. ISBN 9780415440554.
- Biondich, Mark (2007b). "Radical Catholicism and Fascism in Croatia, 1918–1945". Totalitarian Movements and Political Religions. 8 (2): 383–399. doi:10.1080/14690760701321346. S2CID 145148083.
- Charles Bloomberg and Saul Dubow, eds., Christian-Nationalism and the Rise of the Afrikaner Broederbond in South Africa, 1918–48 (Bloomington, Indiana: Indiana University Press, 1989). ISBN 0-253-31235-3
- Braham, Randolph L.; Miller, Scott (2002) [1998]. The Nazis Last Victims: The Holocaust in Hungary. Detroit, Michigan: Wayne State University Press. ISBN 0-8143-2737-0.
- Bulajić, Milan (1994). The Role of the Vatican in the break-up of the Yugoslav State: The Mission of the Vatican in the Independent State of Croatia. Ustashi Crimes of Genocide. Belgrade: Stručna knjiga.
- Bulajić, Milan (2002). Jasenovac: The Jewish-Serbian Holocaust (the role of the Vatican) in Nazi-Ustasha Croatia (1941–1945). Belgrade: Fund for Genocide Research, Stručna knjiga. ISBN 9788641902211.
- Cornwell, John (1999). Hitler's Pope: The Silence of Pius XII. London, England: Viking Books. ISBN 9780670876204. "editions:PeHUCuKZwW4C."
- Eatwell, Roger (2003). "Reflections on Fascism and Religion". Archived from the original on 1 May 2007.
- Ainslie T. Embree, "The Function of the Rashtriya Swayamsevak Sangh: To Define the Hindu Nation", in Accounting for Fundamentalisms, The Fundamentalism Project. 4th ed. Martin E. Marty and R. Scott Appleby (Chicago, Illinois: University of Chicago Press, 1994), pp. 617–652. ISBN 0-226-50885-4.
- Falconi, Carlo (1970). The Silence of Pius XII. Boston, Massachusetts and Toronto, Canada: Little, Brown, and Company.
- Feldman, Matthew; Turda, Marius; Georgescu, Tudor, eds. (2008). Clerical Fascism in Interwar Europe. Routledge. ISBN 9781317968993.
- Gilbert, Martin (1986). The Holocaust: the Jewish tragedy. Collins. ISBN 0-00-216305-5.
- Gilbert, Martin (2004). The Righteous: The Unsung Heroes of the Holocaust. Henry Holt and Company. ISBN 978-1-4299-0036-2.
- Griffin, Roger, ed. (2005). Fascism, Totalitarianism and Political Religion. Routledge. ISBN 9781136871689.
- Griffin, Roger (2007). "The 'Holy Storm': 'Clerical fascism' through the Lens of Modernism". Totalitarian Movements and Political Religions. 8 (2): 213–227. doi:10.1080/14690760701321130. S2CID 143765495.
- Juergensmeyer, Mark (1993). The New Cold War?: Religious Nationalism Confronts the Secular State. Berkeley, California: University of California Press. ISBN 0-520-08651-1.
- Kay, Hugh (1970). Salazar And Modern Portugal. Hawthorn Books. ISBN 9783785700785.
- Kertzer, David I. (2014). The Pope and Mussolini: The Secret History of Pius XI and the Rise of Fascism in Europe. Oxford University Press. ISBN 9780198716167.
- Laqueur, Walter (1966). Fascism: Past, Present, Future. New York; Oxford, England: Oxford University Press, 1997. ISBN 0-19-511793-X
- Nicholas M. Nagy-Talavera, The Green Shirts and the Others: A History of Fascism in Hungary and Romania. Iaşi, Romania and Oxford, England: The Center for Romanian Studies, 2001. ISBN 973-9432-11-5.
- Nelis, Jan; Morelli, Anne; Praet, Danny, eds. (2015). Catholicism and Fascism in Europe 1918–1945. Georg Olms. ISBN 9783487421278.
- Novak, Viktor (2011). Magnum Crimen: Half a Century of Clericalism in Croatia. Vol. 1b. Jagodina: Gambit. ISBN 9788676240494.
- Novak, Viktor (2011). Magnum Crimen: Half a Century of Clericalism in Croatia. Vol. 2. Jagodina: Gambit. ISBN 9788676240494.
- O'Reilly, Charles T. (2001). Forgotten Battles: Italy's War of Liberation, 1943–1945b. Lexington Books. ISBN 978-0-7391-0195-7.
- Walid Phares, Lebanese Christian Nationalism: The Rise and Fall of an Ethnic Resistance (Boulder, Colorado: L. Rienner, 1995). ISBN 1-55587-535-1
- Phayer, Michael (2000). The Catholic Church and the Holocaust, 1930–1965. Bloomington, Indiana and Indianapolis, Indiana: Indiana University Press. ISBN 9780253337252.
- Phayer, Michael (2008). Pius XII, the Holocaust, and the Cold War. Bloomington, Indiana and Indianapolis, Indiana: Indiana University Press. ISBN 9780253349309.
- Pollard, John F. (2008). "Clerical Fascism: Context, Overview and Conclusion". Clerical Fascism in Interwar Europe. London, England and New York: Routledge. pp. 221–234. ISBN 9781317968993.
- Pollard, John F. (2014). The Vatican and Italian Fascism, 1929–32: A Study in Conflict. Cambridge: Cambridge University Press. ISBN 978-0-521-26870-7.
- Rhodes, Anthony (1973). The Vatican in the Age of the Dictators 1922–1945. New York: Holt, Rinehart and Winston. ISBN 9780030077364.
- Rivelli, Marco Aurelio (1998). Le génocide occulté: État Indépendant de Croatie 1941–1945 [Hidden Genocide: The Independent State of Croatia 1941–1945] (in French). Lausanne: L'age d'Homme. ISBN 9782825111529.
- Rivelli, Marco Aurelio (1999). L'arcivescovo del genocidio: Monsignor Stepinac, il Vaticano e la dittatura ustascia in Croazia, 1941–1945 [The Archbishop of Genocide: Monsignor Stepinac, the Vatican and the Ustaše dictatorship in Croatia, 1941–1945] (in Italian). Milano, Italy: Kaos. ISBN 9788879530798.
- Rivelli, Marco Aurelio (2002). 'Dio è con noi!': La Chiesa di Pio XII complice del nazifascismo ['God is with us!': The Church of Pius XII accomplice to Nazi Fascism] (in Italian). Milano, Italy: Kaos. ISBN 9788879531047.
- Rothkirchen, Livia (1989). "Vatican Policy and the 'Jewish Problem' in Independent Slovakia (1939–1945)". In Marrus, Michael R. (ed.). The Nazi Holocaust. Vol. 3. Wesport: Meckler. pp. 1306–1332. ISBN 0-88736-255-9. or ISBN 0-88736-256-7
- Rychlak, Ronald J. (2010). Hitler, the War, and the Pope (Revised and expanded ed.). South Bend, Indiana: Our Sunday Visitor. ISBN 9781612781969.
- Schindley, Wanda; Makara, Petar, eds. (2005). Jasenovac: Proceedings of the First International Conference and Exhibit on the Jasenovac Concentration Camps. Dallas Publishing. ISBN 9780912011646.
- Volovici, Leon (1991). Nationalist Ideology and Antisemitism: The Case of Romanian Intellectuals in the 1930s. Oxford, England: Pergamon Press. ISBN 0-08-041024-3.
- Ward, James Mace (2013). Priest, Politician, Collaborator: Jozef Tiso and the Making of Fascist Slovakia. Ithaca, New York: Cornell University Press. ISBN 978-0-8014-6812-4.
- Wolff, Richard J. “The Catholic Church and the Dictatorships in Slovakia and Croatia, 1939–1945.” Records of the American Catholic Historical Society of Philadelphia 88, no. 1/4 (1977): 3–30. http://www.jstor.org/stable/44210893.
- Various authors, ‘Clerical Fascism’ in Interwar Europe, special issue of Totalitarian Movements and Political Religions, Volume 8, Issue 2, 2007.
