= ALDE =

ALDE or Alliance of Liberals and Democrats may refer to:

- Alliance of Liberals and Democrats for Europe (disambiguation)
- Alliance of Liberals and Democrats (Romania), a political party founded in 2015 and dissolved in 2022

== See also ==
- Alde (disambiguation)
- Liberal Alliance (disambiguation)
- Democratic Alliance (disambiguation)
- Alliance of Democrats (disambiguation)
- Liberal Democratic Party (disambiguation)
