= NDC =

NDC or ndc may refer to:

== Education ==
- National Defence College (disambiguation)
- NATO Defence College, Rome, Italy
- Notre Dame College, Ohio
- Notre Dame College, Dhaka, Bangladesh
- Notre Dame College, Mymensingh, Bangladesh
- Notre Dame College, Shepparton, Australia
- Notre Dame College (Hong Kong)
- Notre Dame College (New Hampshire), United States
- Notre Dame College (Staten Island), United States

== Government ==
- National Defence Commission of North Korea
- National Development Company
- National Development Council of India
- National Development Council of Taiwan
- Nationally Determined Contribution, key component of international climate change agreements
- New Deal for Communities, UK
- U.S. Army Natick Development Center, a research and development center for soldier equipment

== Healthcare ==
- NDC Health or NDC, a former division of McKesson Corporation.
- National drug code, US medication identifier

== Politics ==
- National Democratic Coalition (disambiguation)
- National Democratic Congress (Ghana), a political party in Ghana
- National Democratic Congress (Grenada), a political party in Grenada
- National Democratic Congress (Zambia), a political party in Zambia
- New Democrat Coalition, a group in the U.S. Democratic Party
- North District Council, the district council for the North District in Hong Kong
- National Dialogue Conference, for Yemeni crisis
- National Democratic Congress (Nigeria), a political party in Nigeria

== Other uses ==
- National Destination Code, a part of MSISDN, identifies one or part of a PLMN
- National Development Complex, Pakistan
- New Distribution Capability, a data exchange format for airlines by the International Air Transport Association
- National Dual Contract in Welsh Rugby Union
- Network Distribution Center of the United States Postal Service
- Nippon Decimal Classification, Japanese library classification
- Nduma Defense of Congo, a militia
- N.D.C., a 2002 single by Australian band Jebediah
- Non-Destructive Characterisation, in nondestructive testing
- IATA code for Nanded Airport, India
