= Unione Nazionale =

Unione Nazionale is Italian for "National Union" and may refer to:

- National Union (Italy, 1923), a pro-fascist Catholic party
- National Union (Italy, 1924), an anti-fascist liberal party
- National Union (Italy, 1947), a parliamentary group

== See also ==
- National Union (disambiguation)
