= Workers' Party =

Workers' Party is a name used by several political parties throughout the world. The name has been used by both organisations on the left and right of the political spectrum. It is currently used by followers of Marxism, Marxism–Leninism, Maoism, Juche, social democracy, democratic socialism, national socialism, socialism, communism and Trotskyism.

== Current Workers' Parties ==
Country	Party	Political orientation
Algeria	Workers' Party	Trotskyist
Argentina	Workers' Party	Trotskyist
Australia	Australian Workers Party	Social democracy
Bangladesh	Workers Party of Bangladesh	Marxist–Leninist
Belgium	Workers' Party of Belgium	Marxist
Brazil	Workers' Party	Social democracy
Brazil	Unified Socialist Workers' Party	Trotskyist
Brazil	Party of Worker's Cause	Trotskyist
Costa Rica	Workers' Party	Trotskyist
Czech Republic	Workers' Party of Social Justice	Neo-Nazism
Egypt	Workers Democratic Party	Social democracy
Ecuador	Workers' Party of Ecuador	Communist
Finland	Workers' Party of Finland	Socialist
France	Workers' Party (France, 2015)	Communist
Guinea-Bissau	Workers' Party	Socialist
Hungary	Hungarian Workers' Party	Marxist–Leninist
India (Maharashtra state)	Peasants and Workers Party of India	Marxist
India (West Bengal state)	Workers Party of India	Communist
Ireland (incl. Northern Ireland)	Workers' Party	Marxist–Leninist
Jamaica	Workers Party of Jamaica	Marxist–Leninist
Montenegro	Workers' Party	Labour rights
Nepal	Nepal Workers Peasants Party	Juche
North Korea	Workers' Party of Korea	Juche
Paraguay	Workers' Party	Trotskyist
Singapore	Workers' Party	Social democracy
Spain	Workers' Party	Communist
Sweden (Västerbotten County)	Workers' Party	Trotskyist
Turkey	Workers' Party of Turkey	Marxist–Leninist
United Kingdom	Workers Revolutionary Party	Trotskyist
United Kingdom	Workers Party of Britain	Socialist
United States	Workers Party (United States)	Marxist–Leninist
United States	South Carolina Workers Party	Labor rights
United States	Workers Party of Massachusetts	Socialist
United States	West Virginia Mountain Party	Ecosocialism
Uruguay	Workers' Party	Trotskyist

== Defunct Workers' Parties ==
Defunct Workers' parties include:

Country	Party	Political orientation	Reason defunct
Australia	Workers Party	Libertarian	
Bahamas	Workers' Party		
Barbados	Workers Party of Barbados	Marxist	Defunct due to unpopularity
Brazil	Worker's and Peasant's Bloc		1937–1930.
Brazil	Work's National Union		1945–1948.
Brazil	Nationalist Workers' Party		1989.
Brazil	Nationalist Brazilian Workers' Party		1989–1992. Merged into Labour Party of Brazil.
Brazil	General Workers' Party		1995–2003. Merged into Liberal Party.
Cambodia	Workers' Party of Kampuchea (1960–1966)	Communist	Renamed to Communist Party of Kampuchea in 1966. Dissolved in 1981.
Canada	Workers' Party of Canada (1922–1924)	Communist	Legal face of the illegal Communist Party until the government's ban was lifted.
Canada	Workers' Party of Canada (1934–1937)	Trotskyist	Dissolved upon entry into the Co-operative Commonwealth Federation. Reformed in 1939 as the Socialist Workers League.
Canada	Revolutionary Workers Party (1946–1952)	Trotskyist	Entered the Co-operative Commonwealth Federation.
Croatia	Croatian Workers Party (1906–1918)	Left-wing populist	
Czech Republic	Workers' Party	National Socialist	Banned in 2010 by the Supreme Administrative Court of the Czech Republic
Estonia	Estonian Workers' Party	Communist	
Ethiopia	Workers' Party of Ethiopia	Marxist–Leninist	Overthrown in 1991
Finland	Socialist Workers' Party of Finland	Marxist	Banned in 1923
France	Workers' Party (France, 1991–2008)	Trotskyist	
Germany	German Workers' Party	Nationalist	Renamed the National Socialist German Workers' Party in 1920
Germany	National Socialist German Workers' Party	National Socialist	Dissolved and banned in 1945
Germany	Workers' Party of Germany	Juche	
Haiti	Haitian Workers' Party	Marxist–Leninist	
Hungary	Hungarian Workers' Party	National Socialist	Dissolved and regrouped
Ireland	Irish Workers' Party	Communist	Merged with the Communist Party of Northern Ireland to reconstitute the all-Ireland Communist Party of Ireland in 1962
Israel	Workers Party of Eretz Israel (Mapai)	Labor Zionism	Merged into the Israeli Labor Party
Israel	United Workers Party (Mapam)	Labor Zionism	Merged into Meretz
Israel	Workers of Agudat Yisrael	Haredi Judaism	
Korea	Workers' Party of North Korea; Workers' Party of South Korea	Communist; Communist	Merged to form the Workers' Party of Korea in 1949
Latvia	Workers' Party	Left-wing politics	
Mexico	Mexican Workers' Party	Social democratic	Merged with the Unified Socialist Party of Mexico to form the Mexican Socialist Party in 1987
New Zealand	Workers Party of New Zealand	Marxist	Renamed to Fightback in 2013
North Macedonia	Workers Party	Left-wing politics	
Poland	Polish Workers' Party	Communist	Merged to form the Polish United Workers' Party in 1948
Poland	Polish United Workers' Party	Marxist–Leninist	Self-dissolved in 1990
Poland	Zionist Workers Party		
Romania	Romanian Workers' Party	Communist	Renamed the Romanian Communist Party in 1965
South Africa	Workers Party of South Africa	Trotskyist	Banned in 1953
Spain	Workers' Party of Marxist Unification	Marxist	Dissolved in 1980
Trinidad and Tobago	Workers and Farmers Party	Marxist	Defunct due to unpopularity
Trinidad and Tobago	British Empire Citizens' and Workers' Home Rule Party	Garveyism	Popularly known as the Butler Party, defunct due to unpopularity
Trinidad and Tobago	Progressive Workers Democrat Movement		Defunct due to unpopularity
Turkey	Workers' Party	Scientific socialist	Renamed the Patriotic Party in 2015
Turkey	Kurdistan Workers' Party		Ceasefire with the government in 2025
United Kingdom	International Leninist Workers Party	Marxist–Leninist	Dissolved into the Socialist Labour Party in 1996
United Kingdom	Workers Party of Scotland	Marxist–Leninist	
United States	Democratic Workers Party	Marxist–Leninist	Dissolved in 1986
United States	Workers Party	Trotskyist	Renamed the Independent Socialist League in 1949
United States	American Workers Party	Musteite	Merged into Workers Party of the United States
United States	Workers Party of America	Marxist–Leninist	Became Communist Party USA in 1929.
United States	Workers Party of the United States	Trotskyist	Absorbed into the Socialist Party of America in 1936
Vietnam	Worker's Party of Vietnam	Marxist–Leninist	Renamed the Communist Party of Vietnam in 1976

== See also ==
- List of Labour parties
- Communist party (disambiguation)
- National Socialist Workers Party (disambiguation)
- National Workers Party (disambiguation)
- Socialist party (disambiguation)
- Socialist Workers Party (disambiguation)
- United Workers' Party (disambiguation)
- Lists of political parties
