= Christian Democratic Party (disambiguation) =

A Christian democratic party is a political party that seeks to apply Christian principles to public policy.

Christian Democratic Party or Christian Democrats may also refer to :

== Active parties ==
- African Christian Democratic Party, South Africa
- Albanian Christian Democratic Party of Kosovo
- Christian Democratic Party of Albania
- Christian Democratic Party (Argentina)
- Christian Democratic Party (Australia)
- Christian Democratic Party (Bolivia)
- Christian Democrat Party of Chile
- Christian Democratic Party of Cuba
- Christian Democrat Party (Democratic Republic of the Congo)
- Christian Democrats (Denmark)
- Christian Democratic Party (El Salvador)
- Christian Democratic Party of Honduras
- Christian Democracy (Italy, 2004)
- Christian Democracy (Italy, 2012)
- Christian Democratic Party (Italy)
- Christian Democratic Party (Norway)
- Christian Democratic Party (Papua New Guinea)
- Christian Democratic Party (Paraguay)
- Christian Democratic Party of Russia
- Christian Democratic Party (Rwanda)
- Christian Democratic Party of Serbia
- Christian Democrats (Sweden)
- Christian Democratic Party (Timor-Leste)
- Christian Democratic Party of Uruguay
- Demochristian Party of Albania
- Sammarinese Christian Democratic Party, San Marino
- United Christian Democratic Party, South Africa

== Historical parties ==
- Christian Democratic Party (Belize)
- Christian Democratic Party (Brazil)
- Christian Democratic Party (Burundi)
- Croatian Christian Democratic Party, Croatia
- Christian Democratic Party (Czech Republic)
- Christian People's Party (Estonia)
- Christian Democracy (Italy), 1943
- Christian Democracy (Italy, 2002)
- Christian Democracy for Autonomies, Italy
- Christian Democratic Party (Jamaica)
- Christian Democratic Party of Moldova
- Christian Democratic Party (Namibia)
- Christian Democratic Party (Netherlands)
- Christian Democratic Party (Samoa)
- Slovene Christian Democrats, Slovenia
- Christian Democratic Party (South Africa)
- Christian Democratic Party (Spain)

== See also ==
- List of Christian democratic parties
- Christian Democratic Union (disambiguation)
- Christian People's Party (disambiguation)
- Christian Social Party (disambiguation)
