= ALD =

ALD or Ald may refer to:

== Medicine, science and technology ==
- Adrenoleukodystrophy, a disease linked to the X chromosome
- Alcoholic liver disease
- Aldolase or ALD, an enzyme occurring naturally in animals
- Assistive listening device used to improve hearing ability
- Atomic layer deposition, a thin-film deposition technique
- Asymmetric Laplace distribution, in probability theory and statistics

== Places ==
- Alderley Edge railway station, Cheshire, UK (National Rail code ALD)
- Alderney, a Channel Island, Chapman code
- Alderson station, West Virginia, US (Amtrak station code ALD)
- Allahabad Junction railway station, Uttar Pradesh, India (station code ALD)
- Alerta Airport, Peru (IATA code ALD)

== Politics ==
- Autonomy Liberty Democracy, a coalition of centre-left political parties in Aosta Valley, Italy
- Arakan League for Democracy, a political party active in Rakhine State, Myanmar (Burma)

== Businesses ==
- Aimé Leon Dore, American fashion brand
- ALD Automotive, a French fleet managing and operational car leasing company

== Other uses ==
- Ald (unit), an old Mongolian measure equal to the length between a man's outstretched arms
- Alderman, a member of a municipal assembly or council
- Assistant lighting designer, in the theatre
- Oxford Advanced Learner's Dictionary
- ALD, the Liberty dollar (private currency)
- Acting lance daffadar, a military rank in Indian and Pakistani armies

== See also ==
- Aldehyde, an organic compound
  - Aldehyde dehydrogenase (ALDH), a type of enzyme
- Aldolase, or Fructose-bisphosphate aldolase, an enzyme
- ALD-52, a chemical analogue of lysergic acid diethylamide (LSD)
- ALDE (disambiguation)
- Alde (disambiguation)
