= CVP =

CVP may mean:

== Medicine ==
- Central venous pressure, the pressure of blood in the thoracic vena cava
- CVP (chemotherapy), regime of Cyclophosphamide + Vincristine + Prednisone/Prednisolone

== Water ==
- Crane Valley Partnership, related to the River Crane, London, England
- Central Valley Project, water project in California, USA

== Transport ==
- Continuous Voyage Permit, related to Transport in Australia
- CVP, the code for Kovilpatti railway station, Tamil Nadu

== Organisations ==
- Christelijke Volkspartij, Belgian political party, later renamed Christen-Democratisch en Vlaams (CD&V)
- Christlichdemokratische Volkspartei der Schweiz, the Christian Democratic People's Party of Switzerland
- Christian People's Party (disambiguation), multiple parties in Germany

== Business ==
- Corporación Venezolana de Petroleo, a subsidiary of Petróleos de Venezuela S.A.
- CVP analysis (Cost-Volume-Profit analysis)
- Customer value proposition
- Centerview Partners, an American independent investment banking firm

== Science and technology ==
- Content Vectoring Protocol
- Closest vector problem
- Circuit value problem, in computer science

== Other ==
- The Chess Variant Pages, A website about chess variants
