= NUDP =

NUDP may refer to:

- National Union for Democratic Progress, political party in Liberia
- National Union for Democracy and Progress, several pages
- New United Democratic Party, political party in South Korea
