= Union of the Left =

Union of the Left may refer to:

- Union of the Left (France)
- Union of the Left (Poland)

== See also ==
- Left Union (disambiguation)
- The Union (Italy)
- Union of the Socialist Left
- United Left (disambiguation)
