= Alliance Party =

Alliance Party may refer to the following political parties:

- Alliance Party of Kenya (Kenya)
- Alliance (New Zealand political party) (New Zealand)
- Alliance Party of Northern Ireland (United Kingdom)
- Alliance Party (Fiji)
- Alliance Party (Malaysia)
- Alliance Party (Panama)
- Alliance Party (Sweden)
- Alliance Party (United States)

== See also ==
- Alliance (disambiguation)
- National Alliance (disambiguation)
- New Alliance Party (disambiguation)
