= Alliance for Democracy =

Alliance for Democracy may refer to:

- Alliance for Democracy (Dominican Republic)
- Alliance for Democracy (Malawi)
- Alliance for Democracy in Mali
- Alliance for Democracy (Nigeria)
- Alliance for Democracy (UK)
- Alliance for Democracy (USA)
- Alliance for Democracy, a fictional multinational organization in S. M. Sterling's Domination of Draka series of alternate-history novels

== See also ==
- Alliance of Democracies
- Alliance of Democrats (disambiguation)
- Democratic Alliance (disambiguation)
