= UWP =

UWP may refer to:

== Education ==
- University of Wisconsin–Parkside, located in Somers, Wisconsin, US
- University of Wisconsin–Platteville, located in Platteville, Wisconsin, US
- Up with People, an education organization with headquarters in the US

== Information technology ==
- Universal Windows Platform, platform-homogeneous application architecture created by Microsoft and first introduced in Windows 10

== Politics ==
- United Workers' Party (disambiguation)
  - Mapam (United Workers' Party), in Israel
  - Polish United Workers' Party, in Poland
  - United Workers' Party (Dominica), in Dominica
  - United Workers Party (Saint Lucia), in Saint Lucia
