= National Union =

National Union may refer to:

== Political organisations ==
- National Union (Chad), a political party
- National Union Movement (Chile), a pro-Pinochet political party from 1983 to 1987
- National Union Party (Costa Rica), several liberal conservative parties
- National Union (Egypt), Nasser's party in Egypt and the United Arab Republic, 1957–1962
- National Union (Gabon), a political party
- National Union Party (Iran), a royalist party
- National Union (Israel), an alliance of right-wing and nationalist parties from 1999 to 2013
- National Union (Italy, 1923), a pro-fascist Catholic party
- National Union (Italy, 1924), an anti-fascist party
- National Union (Italy, 1947), a parliamentary group
- National Union Movement (Jordan), founded in 2024
- National Union (Latvia), a far-right party from 1919 to 1934
- National Union (Madagascar), an alliance of TIM, AVI and RPSD
- National Union (Netherlands), a fascist party active during the 1920s and 1930s
- National Union (Peru), a political party
- National Union (Portugal), a party of the Estado Novo regime from 1930 to 1974
- National Union (Poland), a landowners' organization in the Prussian partition from 1910 to 1914
- National Union (South Africa), a short-lived party founded in 1960
- National Union (Spain, 1900), a regenerationist party from 1900 to 1902
- National Union (Spain), a far right electoral coalition in 1979
- National Union (Switzerland), a French-speaking fascist party between 1932 and 1939
- National Union Party (United States), a temporary coalition of Republicans, War Democrats, and Unconditional Unionists during the 1860s

== Other uses ==
- National Union (club), a political London gentlemen's club from 1887 to c.1900

== See also ==
- National Union of Greece, an antisemitic nationalist party from 1927 to 1944
- National Unionist Party (Greece), a centre-left party from 1935 to 1950
- National Union for Territories Group, a far-right group in the Senate of France
- Nationalist Union of the People, a political alliance in Bolivia from 1978
- Kenya African National Union, a political party
- Liberia National Union, a political party
- Lithuanian Nationalist Union, a political party from 1924 to 1940
- Russian National Union, a Neo-Nazi party from 1993 to c.1998
- Transvaal National Union, an organisation supporting uitlanders from 1895 to 1896
- Ukrainian National Union (political party), a far-right organisation
- Union Nationale (Quebec), a provincial party in Canada from 1935 to 1989
- Union of Nationalists, a political alliance in Greece from the 1940s
- National Unity (disambiguation)
- National Union for Democracy and Progress (disambiguation)
