= New Turkey Party =

New Turkey Party may refer to:

- New Turkey Party (1961), a defunct party founded in 1961
- New Turkey Party (2002), a defunct party founded in 2002
- New Turkey Party (current), a defunct party founded in 2023

== See also ==
- New Party (Turkey)
