= PNP =

PNP or PnP may refer to:

== Government ==
- Provincial Nomination Program, an immigration scheme by the Government of Canada
- Peruvian National Police Policía Nacional del Perú)
- Philippine National Police

== Organizations ==
- Pick n Pay, a major South African supermarket chain
- Princess Naoko Planning, Naoko Takeuchi's studio
- Princeton Newport Partners, a hedge fund
- Press Network of Pakistan, Islamabad based media house

== Politics ==
- New Progressive Party (Puerto Rico)
- Partido Nashonal di Pueblo, a Curaçaoan political party
- National Popular Party (Romania)
- Parti national populaire, a 1970s political party in Quebec, Canada
- People's New Party, Japan
- Peoples National Party (disambiguation)
- Peruvian Nationalist Party
- Progressive National Party (disambiguation)

== Science and technology ==
- Purine nucleoside phosphorylase, an enzyme
- 4-Nitrophenol or p-nitrophenol
- Pyridoxine phosphate, a form of vitamin B_{6}
- PNP transistor
- P versus NP problem
- Plug and play, not requiring configuration
  - Legacy Plug and Play or Legacy PnP
- Perspective-n-Point in computer vision
- Pick-and-place machine for assembling electronic circuit boards
- Print-and-play, board games with parts designed to be printed by players

== Other uses ==
- Party and play (PnP), sex with drug use
- Pindus National Park, a protected area in Greece

== See also ==
- P&P (disambiguation)
- UPnP (UPnP), networking protocols
