= Up =

Up most often refers to the relative direction opposed to down.

Up or UP may also refer to:

== Arts and media ==
=== Film ===
- Up! (1976 film), a sex comedy by Russ Meyer
- Up (1984 film), an Oscar-winning short film by Mike Hoover and Tim Huntley
- Up (2009 film), an animated feature by Disney/Pixar

=== Music ===
==== Bands ====
- The Up, a Detroit protopunk band

==== Albums ====
- Up (ABC album), 1989
- Up (Right Said Fred album), 1992
- Up (Great Big Sea album), 1995
- Up (R.E.M. album), 1998
- Up (Peter Gabriel album), 2002
- Up! (album), by Shania Twain, 2002
- Up (soundtrack), for the Disney/Pixar film, 2009
- Up (Pop Evil album), 2015

==== Songs ====
- "Up" (Aespa song), 2024
- "Up" (Cardi B song), 2021
- "Up" (Inna song), 2021
- "Up" (James Morrison song), 2011
- "Up" (Olly Murs song), 2014
- "Up" (The Saturdays song), 2008
- "Up!" (Bini & BGYO song), 2022
- "Up!" (LoveRance song), 2011
- "Up!" (Samantha Jade song), 2014
- "Up!" (Shania Twain song), 2002
- "Up", a 2021 song by Dune Rats
- "Up", a song by Kim Fowley from the 1968 album Outrageous
- "Up", a song by Justin Bieber from the 2010 album My World 2.0
- "Up!", a song by M83 from the 2008 album Saturdays = Youth
- "Up", a song by Nav from the 2017 mixtape Nav
- "Up", a song by Oneohtrix Point Never from the 2011 album Replica
- "Up", a 2007 song by Rob Crow
- "Up", a song by the Scythe from the 2026 album Strictly 4 the Scythe
- "Up", a song by Take That from the 2017 album Wonderland

=== Television ===
- Up (TV program), on MSNBC
- Up (film series), a British documentary series following several people over their lives
- Up (TV channel), formerly known as GMC
- RTLup, a German television channel
- VOXup, a sister German television channel of VOX (German TV channel)

=== Other uses in arts and media ===
- Up, a 1968 novel by Ronald Sukenick
- Up (video game), based on the Disney/Pixar film
- Up!, a musical comedy also known as Via Galactica
- United Press, now United Press International

== Businesses and organizations ==
=== Businesses ===
- Up (airline), a former low-cost airline
- Bahamasair, IATA airline code UP
- Union Pacific Railroad
- Union Pearson Express, or UP Express, an airport rail link in Toronto, Canada
- Abbreviation for university press
- Up (Australian bank), a digital bank

=== Political parties ===
- National Popular Party (Romania), a Romanian political party, "Uniunea Patrioților" in Romanian
- Patriotic Union (Colombia), a Colombian political party
- Labour United, a Polish political party, "Unia Pracy" in Polish
- Unidad Popular, a Chilean coalition of political parties
- Unidade Popular, a Brazilian political party
- Union for the Homeland, an Argentine political coalition, "Unión por la Patria" in Spanish
- United Party (disambiguation), any of several political parties
- Unity Party (disambiguation), any of several political parties

=== Schools ===
- Palacký University Olomouc, Czech Republic
- Panamerican University, Mexico, "Universidad Panamericana" in Spanish
- Pancasila University, Indonesia
- Pedagogical University, Mozambique
- Umutara Polytechnic, Rwanda
- University of Patras, Greece
- University of Pennsylvania, United States
- University of the Philippines, national university system of the Philippines
- University of Phoenix, United States
- University of Poitiers, France
- University of Portland, United States
- University of Porto, Portugal
- University of Potsdam, Germany
- University of Pretoria, South Africa

=== Other organizations ===
- UP Warriorz, an Indian T20 cricket team in the Women's Premier League

== Places ==
- -up, a suffix in Australian place names
- United Provinces (disambiguation)
- University Park, Pennsylvania, United States
- University Park, Texas, United States
- Upper Peninsula of Michigan, United States
- Uttar Pradesh, India
- Eup (administrative division), also spelled ŭp, an administrative unit in both North Korea and South Korea

== Science, technology, and mathematics ==
- Uncertainty principle, a fundamental limit to measurement precision
- Unified Process, a software development process framework
- Unrotated projectile, an anti-aircraft weapon
- UP (complexity)
- Up (game theory)
- Up quark, in physics
- Upper Paleolithic, a stone age

== Other uses ==
- Volkswagen Up, an automobile
- Up, a cocktail term
- Up, a railroad direction
- Up, a term in sports designating one's turn, similar to "at bat" in baseball
- Underpowered (game balance)
- Unitary patent, also known as "European patent with unitary effect", a type of European patent
- Universitas Pancasila railway station (coded IP) in Jakarta, Indonesia
- Union Pearson Express (or UP Express), an airport rail link Toronto, Ontario, Canada

== See also ==
- Up Up Up Up Up Up, a 1999 album by Ani DiFranco
- Upp (disambiguation)
- Upward (disambiguation)
- Position (geometry)
- Straight up (bartending)
- ↑ (disambiguation) (up arrow)
- 1-up, an extra life in video games
- N-up, a printing page layout
