= 1992 Guyanese general election =

- 5 October 1992

53 of the 65 seats in the National Assembly 33 seats needed for a majority
- Registered: 384,195
- Turnout: 88.70% (▲14.87pp)
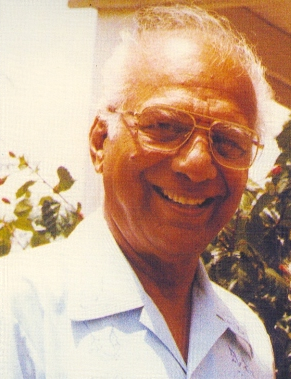

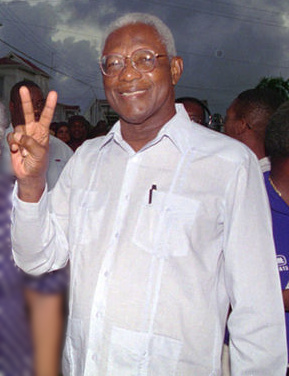
	First party	Second party
Candidate	Cheddi Jagan	Desmond Hoyte
Party	PPP/C	PNC
Last election	15.77%, 8 seats	78.54%, 42 seats
Seats won	32	31
Seat change	▲24	▼23
Popular vote	162,058	128,286
Percentage	53.45%	42.31%
Swing	▲36.23pp	▼37.68pp
- Results by district
President before election
Desmond Hoyte
PNC
Elected President
Cheddi Jagan
PPP/C

General elections were held in Guyana on 5 October 1992. They were the first free and fair elections since 1964. The newly created People's Progressive Party/Civic alliance ended the People's National Congress' 28-year rule, winning 28 of the 53 seats and 53.5% of the vote following a landslide victory. Voter turnout was 80.4%.

== Electoral system ==
The National Assembly had 65 members; 53 elected by proportional representation in a nationwide constituency, 10 appointed by the Regional Councils elected on the same date as the national members, and 2 appointed by the National Congress of Local Democratic Organs, an umbrella body representing the regional councils.

The President was elected by a first-past-the-post double simultaneous vote system, whereby each list nominated a presidential candidate and the presidential election itself was won by the candidate of the list having a plurality.

== Results ==
Party	Presidential candidate	Votes	%	Seats				
Party	Presidential candidate	Votes	%	Elected	Regional appointees	NCLDO appointees	Total	+/–
People's Progressive Party/Civic	Cheddi Jagan	162,058	53.45	28	4	0	32	+24
People's National Congress	Desmond Hoyte	128,286	42.31	23	6	2	31	–23
Working People's Alliance	Clive Y. Thomas	6,086	2.01	1	0	0	1	0
United Force	Manzoor Nadir	3,183	1.05	1	0	0	1	–1
Democratic Labour Movement	Paul Tennassee	1,557	0.51	0	0	0	0	0
United Republican Party	Leslie Ramsammy	1,343	0.44	0	0	0	0	0
People's Democratic Movement	Llewelyn John	270	0.09	0	0	0	0	0
Union of Guyanese International	Lindley GeBorde	134	0.04	0	0	0	0	0
National Republican Party	Robert Gangadeen	114	0.04	0	0	0	0	0
United Workers Party	Winston Payne	77	0.03	0	0	0	0	0
National Democratic Front	Joseph Bacchus	68	0.02	0	0	0	0	0
Total		303,176	100.00	53	10	2	65	0
Valid votes		303,176	98.17					
Invalid/blank votes		5,666	1.83					
Total votes		308,842	100.00					
Registered voters/turnout		348,195	88.70					
Source: Nohlen, IPU, Carter Center
