= NUP =

NUP is an abbreviation for:

- National Umma Party Sudan. a political party in Sudan
- National Union Party (disambiguation), a number political parties in various states
- National Unity (Israel), a centre-right political alliance since 2022
- National Unity Party (Philippines)
- National Unity Platform, main opposition party in Uganda
- Neapolis University, Pafos, a university in Cyprus
- Necrotizing ulcerative periodontitis, a subclassification of Necrotizing periodontal diseases
- New Union Party, a political party in the United States
- New Unity Partnership, a trade union in the United States
- Northwestern University Press
- Nottingham University Press
- Nuclear Pore
- Número único previsional ('unique social security number'), the identification number for social security in El Salvador

It is also the ISO 639-3 code for the Nupe language.
