= Fatherland (disambiguation) =

Fatherland is the nation of one's "fathers", "forefathers", or "patriarchs".

Fatherland may also refer to:

== Film ==
- Fatherland (1986 film), a film directed by Ken Loach
- Fatherland (1994 film), a television film inspired by Harris's novel
- Fatherland (2025 film), a film directed by Joel Lamangan
- Fatherland (2026 film), a film directed by Paweł Pawlikowski

== Literature ==
- Fatherland (novel), a 1992 alternative history novel by Robert Harris
- Fatherland (short story), a 2011 short story by Viet Thanh Nguyen

== Music ==
- "Fatherland", a 1993 song by Die Krupps from II - The Final Option
- Fatherland (album), a 2017 solo album by Kele Okereke

== Other uses ==
- Fatherland (horse) (1990–1993), an Irish-bred Thoroughbred racehorse
- Fatherland (movement), a political organization started in 2017 in Serbia and Kosovo that represents the Serbian minority in Kosovo
- The Fatherland, a 1914–1917 American World War I-era pro-German periodical

== See also ==
- Fatherland Party (disambiguation)
- Fatherland Union (disambiguation)
- For the Fatherland, a compilation album by Prussian Blue
- Great Patriotic War (term), term for the Eastern Front of WWII in Russian historiography sometimes translated as "Great Fatherland War"
- Patria Grande, Spanish term sometimes translated as "Great Fatherland"
