= Christian social =

Christian social may refer to:

- Christian left
- Christian socialism, a political ideology.
- Christian Social Party (disambiguation), a list of parties of which some do and some do not adhere to this ideology.
- The self-described ideology of the Christian Union (Netherlands)
