= Joint Services Staff College =

Joint Services Staff College may refer to:

- Joint Services Staff College (UK), the former name of the "Joint Service Defence College"
- Joint Services Staff College (Australia), the former name of the "Centre for Defence and Strategic Studies"
