= Liberal National Party =

Liberal National or Liberal National Party may mean:

- Liberal National Party of Queensland, a current Australian political party
- National Liberal Party (UK, 1931), a former British political party also known as the Liberal National Party

== See also ==
- Liberal–National Coalition, a political coalition in Australia
- National Liberal Party (disambiguation)
