= Political moderate =

Rejection of radical or extreme political views

Moderate is an ideological category that designates a rejection of radical or extreme views, especially in regard to politics and religion. In American politics, "moderate" is an ideological category which entails centrist views on a liberal–conservative spectrum.

== Political position ==
=== Japan ===
Japan's right-wing Liberal Democratic Party (LDP) has traditionally been divided into two main factions: the bureaucratic "conservative mainstream" (保守本流) and the hawkish nationalist "conservative anti-mainstream" (保守傍流). Among them, "conservative mainstream" is also considered a moderate wing within the LDP. The LDP's former faction Kōchikai is considered a moderate wing. The current LDP has conflicts between moderate patriotist and extreme nationalist supporters.

The Democratic Socialist Party (DSP) was formed by a group of politicians who splintered off of the Japan Socialist Party (JSP) in 1960. The party advocated a moderate social-democratic politics and supported the U.S.-Japan Alliance. The party started to slowly support neoliberalism from the 1980s, and was disbanded in 1994.

Moderate social democrats of the JSP formed the Democratic Party of Japan (DPJ) with conservative-liberal Sakigake and other moderates of the LDP. Most of the DPJ's mainstream factions moved to the Constitutional Democratic Party of Japan (CDP), but the former DPJ's right-wing moved to the Democratic Party for the People after 2019.

=== United States ===
Gallup polling indicates that American voters identified as moderate between 35 and 38% of the time during the 1990s and 2000s. Voters may identify with moderation for a number of reasons: pragmatic, ideological, or otherwise; however, the number of people that vote for centrist political parties is a statistical anomaly, in part due to the entrenched nature of the country's two-party system.

Scholars have debated to what extent moderate political views result in greater electability. According to a 2020 study, moderates have historically performed better in American elections. However, the study finds, "this gap has disappeared in recent years, where moderates and ideologically extreme candidates are equally likely to be elected."

According to a 2026 study, "across a wide range of issues, most Americans appear to have moderate preferences over policy. As expected, Democrats tend to be more liberal than Republicans, but there is significant overlap on every issue, and the average extent of disagreement is modest."

== See also ==
- Blairism
- Brownism
- Centrism
- Centre-left politics
- Centre-right politics
- Independent voter
- Median voter theorem
- Moderate Democrats
- Moderate conservatism
- Moderate Party (disambiguation)
- Moderate Republicans (modern United States)
- New Labour
- New Democrats
- No Labels
- Radical centrism
- The Establishment
