= U of P =

U of P may refer to:

- Univerzita Palackého, a university in the Czech Republic
- University of Patras, a university in Greece
- The Pan-American University, a university in Mexico
- University of the Philippines, a university in the Philippines
- University of Porto, a university in the Portugal
- University of Pretoria, a university in South Africa
- University of Portland, a university in the United States
- University of Pennsylvania, a university in the United States
- University of Pittsburgh, a university in the United States

== See also ==
- UP (disambiguation)
