= Alianza Nacional =

Alianza Nacional may refer to:

- National Alliance (Peru)
- National Alliance (Spain)
- National Alliance (Uruguay)
