= United Democratic Party =

United Democratic Party may refer to:

- United Democratic Party (Belize)
- United Democratic Party (British Guiana)
- United Democratic Party (Cayman Islands)
- United Democratic Party (The Gambia)
- United Democratic Party (Kazakhstan)
- United Democratic Party (Kenya)
- United Democratic Party (Malaysia)
- United Democratic Party (Meghalaya) (India)
- United Democratic Party (Myanmar)
- United Democratic Party (Namibia)
- United Democratic Party (Nepal)
- United Democratic Party (Marshall Islands)
- United Democratic Party (Solomon Islands)
- United Democratic Party (South Korea, 1995)
- United Democratic Party, the former name of the Democratic Party (South Korea, 2008)
- United Democratic Party (Tanzania)

== See also ==
- Democratic Party (disambiguation)
- United Party (disambiguation)
