= People's Alliance Party =

People's Alliance Party may refer to:

- People's Alliance Party (Albania)
- People's Alliance Party (Solomon Islands)

== See also ==
- People's Alliance (disambiguation)
- People's Alliance of New Brunswick
- People's Alliance for Democracy
