= National Action =

National Action may refer to:

- National Action (Australia), a defunct political party
- National Action (Chile, 1963), a defunct political party
- National Action (Italy), a political party
- National Action (Malta), a defunct political party
- National Action (South Africa), a political party
- National Action, a historical political party in Spain, in 1932 renamed Popular Action (Spain)
- National Action (UK), a proscribed neo-Nazi organisation

== See also ==
National Action Party (disambiguation)
