= Union of Guyanese International =

Political party in Guyana

The Union of Guyanese International (UGI) was a political party in Guyana led by Lindley GeBorde.

== History ==
The UGI contested the 1992 general elections, although its name was wrongly printed on ballot papers as United Guyanese International. In the elections the party received just 134 votes and failed to win a seat. It ran in the 1994 local elections, but did not contest any further elections at national level.
