= National Unity =

National Unity may refer to the following political parties:

- National Unity Party (Albania)
- National Unity (Armenia)
- National Unity (Azerbaijan)
- National Unity (Czech Republic)
- National Unity (Greece)
- National Unity (Ireland)
- National Unity (Israel)
- National Unity (Peru, 2000)
- National Unity (Peru, 2025)

== See also ==
- National Union (disambiguation)
- National Unity Party (disambiguation)
- National unity government
- Nasjonal Samling ('National Rally'), a Norwegian far-right party
- Quebec sovereignty movement
