= Nation Party =

Nation Party may refer to:

- Nation Party (Turkey, 1948)
- Nation Party (Turkey, 1962)
- Nation Party (Turkey, 1992)
- Egyptian Nation Party
- Nation Party of Iran
- Japan Nation Party
- Parti Bangsa Malaysia
- Party of the Nation, or National Renaissance Front of Romania
- National Umma Party, Sudan
- Thai Nation Party
- Welsh Nation Party

== See also ==
- National Party (disambiguation)
- Nation and Justice Party, Turkey
