= Homelands =

Homelands may refer to:

- Homeland, native lands
- Homelands (festival), British dance music festival.
- Homelands (Fables), mythical lands in the comic book series Fables.
- Homelands (Magic: The Gathering), MTG expansion set.
- Bantustan, part of the Apartheid system
- The Homelands, football fields in Kingsnorth, England.
- Homelanders, the generation following the Millennials.

== See also ==
- Homeland (disambiguation)
