= Michael Kyaw Myint =

Convicted Burmese businessman

- Born: Kyaw Myint; 1951 (age 74–75); Kachin State, Burma
- Other names: Michael Hua; Michael Hua Hu; Zakhung Zung Sau
- Occupation: Businessman
- Organization: United Wa State Army
- Political party: United Wa State Party; United Democratic Party
- Criminal charges: Money laundering Insider trading Absconding
- Criminal status: Convicted
- Spouse: Nan Bauk
- Children: 4

Michael Kyaw Myint Hua Hu (Burmese: ကျော်မြင့်; Chinese: 胡华; pinyin: Hú Huá), also known as Zakhung Zung Sau, is a Sino-Burmese businessman, known for his ties to the United Wa State Army (UWSA) and for founding the now-defunct United Democratic Party.

== Early life ==
Kyaw Myint was born in 1951, in Kachin State, Burma (now Myanmar). He married Nan Bauk, the youngest daughter of Zau Mai, a high-ranking officer in the United Wa State Army and Communist Party of Burma, of Kachin descent. Kyaw Myint became intimately involved in the UWSA's illicit business activities, including heroin and methamphetamine trafficking.

== Criminal activities ==
=== Money laundering ===
In the 1990s, Kyaw Myint established Myanmar Kyone Yeom, to launder the UWSA's drug proceeds. The company was ultimately closed in 1998 by the Myanmar Investment Commission for involvement in money laundering activities. Kyaw Myint was sentenced to ten years in prison, but he escaped from Mandalay's Obo Prison in 1999. He successfully sought political asylum in the United States, in exchange for cooperating with the US Drug Enforcement Administration. In 2002, Kyaw Myint gained political asylum in Canada, and subsequently migrated to Vancouver.

=== Insider trading ===
In January 2009, the U.S. Securities and Exchange Commission halted trading on Future Canada China Environment, which has ties to Kyaw Myint, after its stock market value soared to over $1 billion USD. In 2011, the British Columbia Securities Commission permanently banned Kyaw Myint from participating in British Columbia's securities markets and fined him for illegal insider trading and perjury, for using insider knowledge to buy shares in Maple Leaf Reforestation, and for lying to investigators.

In 2012, he moved to Kunming, China, exporting goods to Myanmar. In 2013, Kyaw Myint returned to Myanmar, living in Yangon, where he established the Myanmar Kyaw Investment Group Company.

=== Political activities ===
In 2007, Kyaw Myint founded the United Democratic Party (UDP) while living in Canada. In 2010, he formally registered UDP under the name "Hla Myint" to contest the 2010 Myanmar general election. On 17 October 2020, the Union Election Commission formally dissolved the party, finding that the party had violated the Political Parties Registration Law.

=== Re-arrest ===
On 29 September 2020, he was detained on a fugitive warrant. A government investigation also found that he had breached money laundering laws and financial regulations, after authorities found that at least $12.5 million USD had been illegally transferred from China into his company's bank accounts, and that Kyaw Myint's company had provided illegal loans to individuals. On 20 October, Kyaw Myint was charged with absconding from prison, under article 224 of the penal code. On 19 November, he was sentenced to 2 years in prison, pending a potential criminal prosecution for breaching money laundering laws.

== Personal life ==
Kyaw Myint is married to Nan Bauk and has four children.
