= Left Union =

Left Union may refer to:

- Catalan Left Union, a Spanish electoral coalition in 1986
- Left Union for a Clean and Holy Republic, a Bulgarian electoral coalition in 2021
- Revolutionary Left Union, a Peruvian electoral coalition in 1980
- Union of the Left (Poland), the former name of Freedom and Equality party

== See also ==
- Union of the Left (disambiguation)
