= National Democratic Coalition =

The National Democratic Coalition may refer to:

- National Democratic Coalition (Ecuador)
- National Democratic Coalition (Iraq)
- National Democratic Coalition (Liberia)
- National Democratic Coalition (Nigeria)
- National Democratic Alliance, coalition of predominantly right-wing political parties in India, led by the Bharatiya Janata Party

== See also ==
- Democratic Coalition (disambiguation)
- Democratic Alliance (disambiguation)
