= Colorado Party =

Colorado Party (Spanish: Partido Colorado 'colored party', colored referring to red) can refer to two South American political parties:

- Colorado Party (Paraguay)
- Colorado Party (Uruguay)

== See also ==
- Red Party (disambiguation)
- Template:Colorado political parties
- Colorado Center Party
