= Motherland Party =

Motherland Party may refer to:

- Motherland Party (Azerbaijan), established 1990
- Motherland (Latvia), established 2004
- Motherland Party (Iran), in the 1940s
- Motherland Party (Moldova), a political party in Moldova
- Motherland Party (Mongolia), established 1992
- Motherland Party (Turkey), established 1983
- Motherland Party (Turkey, 2011), established 2011
- Motherland (Ukraine), established 2001
- Rodina (political party), or Motherland-National Patriotic Union, Russia
- Electoral Bloc Motherland, Moldova
- Motherland Democratic Coalition, Mongolia

== See also ==
- Fatherland Party (disambiguation)
- Motherland Defenders Party, a Ukraine political party
- List of generic names of political parties
