= Christian Party =

Christian Party may refer to:

- Christian Party of Austria
- Christian Party (Lithuania)
- Christian Party (Samoa)
- Christian Party (St. Maarten)
- Christian Party (UK), includes the Scottish Christian Party and the Welsh Christian Party
- Christian Party (United States, 1930s), a fascist party founded by William Dudley Pelley

== See also ==
- Christian Centre, a conservative fringe party in Germany
- National Christian Party, Romania 1935–1938
- List of Christian democratic parties
- Social Christian Party (disambiguation)
