= Progressive National Party =

Progressive National Party can refer to the following political parties

- Progressive National Party (Panama)
- Progressive National Party (Suriname)
- Progressive National Party (Turks and Caicos Islands)

== See also ==
- PNP (disambiguation)
- Progressive Party (disambiguation)
- National Progressive Party (disambiguation)
