= Alliance of Liberals and Democrats for Europe (disambiguation) =

Alliance of Liberals and Democrats for Europe is a transnational political alliance.

Alliance of Liberals and Democrats for Europe may also refer to:

- Alliance of Liberals and Democrats for Europe group, a former European Parliament group that merged in 2019 into Renew Europe
- Alliance of Liberals and Democrats for Europe Party, the European political party
- Alliance of Liberals and Democrats for Europe in the Parliamentary Assembly of the Council of Europe
- Alliance of Liberals and Democrats for Europe in the European Committee of the Regions

== See also ==
- ALDE (disambiguation)
