= Clive Y. Thomas =

Guyanese economist and political activist

Clive Youlande Thomas (born 6 February 1938) is a Guyanese economics professor and political activist. He publishes on issues relating to development and poverty eradication in Guyana and the greater Caribbean region.

Thomas is currently Presidential Advisor on Sustainable Development and State Assets Recovery at the Ministry of the Presidency; and Chairman of the Guyana Sugar Corporation. He retired after fifty years as Professor of Economics and Director of the Institute of Development Studies, University of Guyana.

== Background ==
Thomas was born on 6 February 1938, as the first of seven children of Clementine Semple and Basil Thomas. He was raised in Georgetown until his academic achievements at Queen's College earned him a scholarship to study at University of Guyana. He obtained his Doctorate in 1964 at the University of London. He joined the University of the West Indies as a university lecturer, until 1969 when he was banned from Jamaica for protesting Walter Rodney's ban from teaching. During his time at UWI, he became involved with other academics in the field of agricultural economics and was a part of the editorial advisory board of New World Journal, a quarterly publication for political economic analysis of colonial countries from the view point from within. Thomas returned to the University of Guyana as a professor and served as director of the Institute for Development Studies, created in 1973 as a department within the Faculty of Social Sciences.

Thomas was elected chair of the University of Guyana Staff Association, and acted in an advisory role for other non-government organizations that campaigned for democracy and social justice. He was also a founding member of Ratoon, a group of university lecturers that strove to enact on research through education. In 1974, Thomas helped Walter Rodney in building the Working People's Alliance (WPA) as a reaction to the political landscape that had been divided by ethnicity. Strife between Afro-Guyanese and Indo-Guyanese was historically encouraged as a form of labour control for the benefit of plantation owners, and at the time also a strategy for the Forbes Burnham administration to maintain political power. Thomas authored many papers for the WPA, including "Bread and Justice. The Struggle for Socialism in Guyana", a booklet that connected economic, social, and political justice in context of small countries. Because the WPA and affiliated groups were seen as a threat to the Burnham government, it was a tumultuous period for Guyanese activism: Walter Rodney was assassinated, Joshua Ramsammy (a colleague of Thomas) was shot, and attempts to kidnap Thomas.

Power struggles still continued after Burnham's death in 1985. In the 1992 Guyanese general election, "the country's first free and fair election since independence" Thomas won a parliamentary seat for the WPA. He was soon awarded Guyana's Cacique Crown of Honour for his contributions to democracy and education in the country.

As Guyana's markets were opened under the advice of WTO, Thomas continued publishing economic literature geared at preparing Guyana in context of the regulation of the WTO. He was actively involved in Transition, Guyana's only academic publication, as well as writing articles for Stabroek News in 2002.

In 2015, Thomas was appointed Presidential Advisor on Sustainable Development.

== Academics ==
He has held Visiting Professorships in Africa (University of Dar-es-Salaam), Canada (Visiting Distinguished Professor at the Norman Patterson School of International Relations), United States (Leonard O’Connor Professor, Colgate University), and the West Indies (George Beckford Professor in Political Economy).

== Organizational works ==
Thomas was co-ordinator of the Regional Programme of Monetary Studies, a member of the Commonwealth Group of Experts on the Changing World Economy and North-South Relations (1990–1991) and the UNDP Group of Experts on Designing the Future: South-South Cooperation in Science and Technology, 2000 and served as a member of the WHO/PAHO Advisory Committee on Health Research, 1996–1999, and was appointed in 2002 to the United Nations Secretary-General's Millennium Project Task Force to monitor the implementation of the Millennium Development Goals. In 2003 he was member of the Caribbean Commission on Health and Development and of UNCTAD's High Level Expert Group on Commodity-Dependent Countries.

He is director of the State Assets Recovery Agency (SARA), which was assembled to "investigate, trace, identify and recover unlawfully obtained state properties from a public official or other persons, wherever in the world it is located, through civil proceedings".

== Awards and honours ==
Acknowledgement of Thomas's work from Guyana and the Caribbean:

- Cacique Crown of Honour for Contributions to Education, Government of Guyana National Awards Scheme 1994
- George Beckford Award for Contributions to Caribbean Economy, Association of Caribbean Economists, 2001
- Honorary Professor, Sir Arthur Lewis Institute of Social and Economic Studies (UWI), 2004
- Honoree: 41st Regional Monetary Studies, Trinidad and Tobago, November 2010.

== Major publications ==
Thomas is the author and co-author of 30 books, and more than 154 academic articles, contributions, and research papers:

- "Guyana: Countering the Risks of Money Laundering, Terrorist Financing and Arms Proliferation (With Addendum)"
- "Eight Essays on the Amaila Falls Hydro Project"
- "Thirty Years After the Third World Debt Crisis: Sovereign Debt Stress in CARICOM (With Specific Reference to Guyana)"
- Study prepared for the United Nations Economic Commission for Latin America and the Caribbean, March 2011, co-authored with Thomas Singh.

In 2002, Thomas became a regular contributor to Stabroek News, writing economics articles for the section "Guyana and the Wider World".
