= National Workers Party =

The National Workers Party can refer to:

- National Workers Party (Pakistan), a left-wing party.
- National Workers' Party (Spain), a far right party.
- National Workers' Party, a centre party from Poland.
- National Workers' Party (United Kingdom) a far right party led by A. F. X. Baron

== See also ==
- National Socialist Workers Party (disambiguation)
- Socialist Workers Party (disambiguation)
- Workers' Party (disambiguation)
