= National Democratic Alliance (disambiguation) =

National Democratic Alliance (NDA) is a coalition of predominantly right-wing political parties in India.

National Democratic Alliance may also refer to:

- National Democratic Alliance (Armenia)
- National Democratic Alliance (Aruba)
- National Democratic Alliance (Georgia)
- National Democratic Alliance (Hungary)
- National Democratic Alliance (Iraq)
- National Democratic Alliance (Israel), a common misnomer for the National Democratic Assembly
- National Democratic Alliance (Italy) (defunct party)
- National Democratic Alliance (Kuwait)
- National Democratic Alliance, a political party in Libya
- National Democratic Alliance (Malawi)
- National Democratic Alliance (Russia)
- National Democratic Alliance (Sierra Leone)
- National Democratic Alliance (Sudan)
- National Democratic Alliance (Trinidad & Tobago)
- Ukrainian National Democratic Alliance (1925–1939)

== See also ==
- Democratic Alliance (disambiguation)
- National Alliance (disambiguation)
- National Democratic Alliance Army, a rebel army in northeastern Burma
