= National Socialist Movement =

National Socialist Movement may refer to:

- Nazi Party, a political party in Germany
  - National Socialist Freedom Movement, a legal alternative created during the period when the Nazi Party was banned
- National Socialist Movement (UK, 1962), a British neo-Nazi group
- National Socialist Movement (UK, 1997), a British neo-Nazi group active during the late 1990s
- National Socialist Movement (United States), a neo-Nazi organization based in Lakeland, Florida
- National Socialist Movement (Netherlands), a Dutch fascist and later national socialist political party
- National Socialist Movement of Chile, a political movement in Chile
- National Socialist Movement of Denmark, a neo-Nazi political party in Denmark
- National Socialist Movement of Norway, a Norwegian neo-Nazi group

== See also ==
- National Socialist Party (disambiguation)
- National Socialist White People's Party
