= National Unity Party =

The National Unity Party, National United Party, Party of National Unity or National Unity Front may refer to:

- National United Party of Afghanistan (founded 2003)
- National Unity Party (Albania)
- National United Party (Armenia), defunct
- National Unity Front, in Bolivia (founded 2003)
- National Unity Party (Canada)
- National Unity Party (Central African Republic)
- Party of National Unity (Czechoslovakia)
- National Unity Party (Dominican Republic) (founded 2002)
- Party of National Unity (Fiji)
- National Unity Party (Guinea-Bissau)
- National Unity Party (Haiti)
- Party of National Unity (Hungary) (1932–1939)
- National Unity Party (Israel)
- National United Front of Kampuchea (1970–75)
- Party of National Unity (Kenya) (founded 2007)
- National Unity Party (Malawi)
- National Unity Party (Moldova)
- National Unity Party (Mozambique)
- National United Front, Myanmar (1955–1962)
- National Unity Party (Myanmar) (founded 1988)
- National Unity Party (Northern Cyprus)
- National Unity Party (Philippines)
- Front of National Unity, in Poland (1952–1983)
- National Unity Alliance, in Sri Lanka (1999–2010)
- National Unity party (United Kingdom) (founded 2025)
- National Unity Party (United States), the party affiliation under which John B. Anderson ran for president in 1980
- National United Party (Vanuatu)

== See also ==
- National Unity (disambiguation)
- National unity government
- National Unity Movement (disambiguation)
- National Party (disambiguation)
- United National Party, Sri Lanka
- United Party (disambiguation)
- Unity Party (disambiguation)
