= Upward =

Upward or Upwards may refer to:

== Arts ==
- Upward (Kandinsky), a 1929 painting by Russian abstract painter Wassily Kandinsky
- Upwards (album), a 2003 album British rapper Ty

== Organizations ==
- Upward Bound, a federally funded educational program within the United States
- Upward Bound High School, a school in Hartwick, New York

== People ==
- Allen Upward (1863–1926), British poet, lawyer, politician and teacher
- Christopher Upward (1938–2002), British orthographer, son of Edward Upward
- Edward Upward (1903–2009), British novelist and short-story writer, cousin of Allen Upward

== Science ==
- Upward (military project), the code name for assistance given to NASA during Project Apollo

== Sport ==
- the Up'ards, the name of one side of the Royal Shrovetide Football contest played in Ashbourne in Derbyshire every year, the other being Down'ards

== See also ==
- up (disambiguation)
