= P&P =

P&P may refer to:

- People & Planet, a UK student campaign network
- Photochemistry and Photobiology, an academic journal
- Picture-in-picture, a feature of some television receivers and similar devices
- Postage and packaging, mail charges
- Pride and Prejudice, a novel by Jane Austen
  - Pride and Prejudice (disambiguation), film adaptations of the Austen novel of the same name
- Progress and Poverty, an 1879 book by social theorist and economist Henry George
- Principles and parameters
- SMT placement equipment or pick-and-place machines, surface mount technology equipment
- Powell and Pressburger, a film-making partnership
- Paper and pencil game, board games and the likes played using pencils or pens
- "P & P", a song by Kendrick Lamar from his 2009 extended play, Kendrick Lamar
- Plug and Play, for solutions where no configuration is needed

== See also ==
- PNP (disambiguation)
