= Fatherland Party =

Fatherland Party may refer to:

- Amanat (political party), Kazakh political party previously known as "Radiant Fatherland"
- Batkivshchyna, Ukrainian political party
- Fatherland – All Russia
- Fatherland Party (Norway)
- German Fatherland Party
- Isamaa, Estonian political party
- National Party – Greeks
- National Will Party, Iranian political party previously known as "Fatherland Party"

== See also ==
- Motherland Party (disambiguation)
- Fatherland Union (disambiguation)
- List of generic names of political parties
