= Nationalist Party =

Nationalist Party may refer to:

== Current parties ==
- Bangladesh Nationalist Party
- Basque Nationalist Party
- Cornish Nationalist Party
- Nacionalista Party (Philippines)
- Nationalist Movement Party (Turkey)
- Nationalist Party of Canada
- Nationalist Party of China, another name for the Kuomintang (Taiwan)
- Nationalist Party (Malta)
- Puerto Rican Nationalist Party

== Defunct parties ==
- Nationalist Party (Australia)
- Nationalist Party (Bolivia)
- Nationalist Party of Bulgaria
- Nationalist Party (Burma)
- Nationalist Party of Cantabria
- Nationalist Party of Castile and León
- Nationalist Party of Greater Vietnam
- Nationalist Party (Greece)
- Nationalist Party (Iceland)
- Nationalist Party (Ireland)
- Nationalist Party (Ivory Coast)
- Nationalist Party (Northern Ireland)
- Nationalist Party (Panama)
- Nationalist Party (Peru)
- Nationalist Party of Peru (Revilla)
- Nationalist Party (Quebec)
- Nationalist Party of the Rif of Melilla
- Nationalist Party (Solomon Islands)
- Nationalist Party (Thailand)
- Nationalist Party of the Valencian Country

== See also ==
- National Party (disambiguation)
