= Christian Democratic Union =

Christian Democratic Union may refer to:

- Christian Democratic Union (Armenia)
- Christian Democratic Union (Belize), a former trade union
- Christian Democratic Union (Bolivia)
- Christian Democratic Union (Dominican Republic)
- Christian Democratic Union (East Germany)
- Christian Democratic Union (Ecuador)
- Christian Democratic Union of Germany
- Christian Democratic Union (Latvia)
- Christian Democratic Union (Lebanon)
- Christian Democratic Union (Lithuania)
- Christian Democratic Union (Namibia)
- Christian Democratic Union (Netherlands)
- Christian Democratic Union (Ukraine)
- Christian and Democratic Union (Czech Republic)

== See also ==
- Christian Democratic Party (disambiguation)
- List of Christian democratic parties
