= Democratic Coalition =

Democratic Coalition may refer to:

- Democratic Coalition (Greece) (1936, Δημοκρατικός Συνασπισμός), a former electoral alliance
- Democratic Coalition (Greece, 2015) (Δημοκρατική Συμπαράταξη), an electoral alliance
- Democratic Coalition (Hungary) (est. 2011, Demokratikus Koalíció), a political party in Hungary
- Democratic Coalition of Namibia (1994–2009)
- British Columbia Democratic Coalition (2004–2005), a coalition of provincial parties in Canada
- Coalition démocratique de Montréal (1989–2001), a former municipal party in Quebec, Canada

- Coalition Démocratique–Montréal Écologique (1994–1998), a former municipal alliance in Quebec, Canada

- New Zealand Democratic Coalition (1996), a proposed party in New Zealand
- Slovak Democratic Coalition (1997–2002, Slovenská demokratická koalícia, SDK), a former political party in Slovakia
- Democratic Coalition (Spain) (1979), a former electoral alliance around the People's Alliance
- The Democratic Coalition, an anti-Donald Trump political action group. (Formerly known as The Democratic Coalition against Trump.)
- United Democratic Coalition (est. 1987, Coligação Democrática Unitária, CDU), a Portuguese electoral alliance
- National Democratic Alliance, coalition of predominantly right-wing political parties in India, led by the Bharatiya Janata Party

== See also ==
- National Democratic Coalition (disambiguation)
- Democratic Alliance (disambiguation)
- Democratic Party (disambiguation)
- Democrat Party (disambiguation)
- Lists of political parties
