= Izquierda Unida =

Izquierda Unida ("United Left") is the name of a number of political parties or coalitions in Spanish-speaking countries:

- United Left (Argentina)
- United Left (Peru)
- United Left (Spain)

== See also ==
- United Left (disambiguation)
