= Homeland, Missouri =

Unincorporated community in Missouri, U.S.

Coordinates: 36°40′03″N 91°55′10″W

Homeland is an unincorporated community in southwest Howell County, in the Ozarks of southern Missouri, United States. The community is located on U.S. Route 160, approximately four miles southwest of West Plains. Arrowhead Lakes on Spring Creek lie just to the southeast.

== History ==
A post office called Homeland was established in 1873, and remained in operation until 1895. Early settlers who petitioned to secure the post office named the community after their home.
