= National Democratic Congress =

National Democratic Congress may refer to:

- National Democratic Congress (Ghana)
- National Democratic Congress (Grenada)
- National Democratic Congress (Zambia)

== See also ==
- National Democratic Party (Egypt)
- National Democratic Party (Ghana)
