= Radical Democratic Party =

Radical Democratic Party is the name of several past and present political parties:

- Estonian Radical Democratic Party
- Radical Democratic Party (Bulgaria)
- Radical Democratic Party (India)
- Radical Democratic Party (Spain)
- Radical Democratic Party of Switzerland
- Radical Democratic Party (Germany)
- Radical Democratic Party (United States)
