= National Alliance =

National Alliance may refer to:

== Electoral alliances ==
- National Alliance (Egypt) (2015)
- National Alliance (Ireland) (2024 onwards)
- National Alliance (Pakistan) (2002-2004)
- Nation Alliance (Turkey) (2018-2023)

== Political parties and organizations ==
- Anguilla National Alliance
- National Alliance (Australia) (1974)
- National Alliance (Greece)
- National Alliance (Italy)
- National Alliance (Latvia) (2010 onwards)
- National Alliance (Lithuania)
- National Alliance (Malaysia)
- National Alliance (Netherlands) (2003-2007)
- National Alliance (Norway)
- National Alliance of Democratic Forces
- National Alliance of Russian Solidarists
- National Alliance (Peru)
- National Alliance of Workers, Farmers, University Students, and Reservists
- National Alliance (Portugal)
- National Alliance (Saint Lucia)
- National Alliance (Sint Maarten)
- National Alliance (South Africa)
- National Alliance (Spain)
- National Alliance (Sweden)
- National Alliance (United States)
- National Alliance (Uruguay)
- National Alliance July 18 (1977)
- National Alliance Party (Papua New Guinea)
- National Alliance Party of Fiji
- National Alliance Party of Kenya
- Nationalist Alliance (2005-2008)
- San Marinese National Alliance
- Somali National Alliance

== Publications ==
- National Alliance (newspaper), a newspaper of the Farmers' Alliance

== See also ==
- National Democratic Alliance (disambiguation)
