= Popular Alliance =

Popular Alliance may refer to:

- Popular Alliance (Bolivia), a 2025 political alliance
- Popular Alliance (Peru), a 2015–2016 political coalition
- Popular Alliance (San Marino), a 1993–2017 political party
- Popular Alliance (San Marino, historical), a 1945–1973 political alliance
- Popular Alliance (Spain), or People's Alliance, a 1976–1989 political coalition

== See also ==
- People's Alliance (disambiguation)
