= Democratic Alliance (Sweden) =

Swedish anti-socialist organisation

Democratic Alliance (Swedish: Demokratisk Allians) was a Swedish anti-Socialist youth organisation. It was known for its support of the United States in the Vietnam War, of NATO, of South African apartheid, and its strong criticism of Olof Palme, then Prime Minister of Sweden.

The organisation was founded in 1967 in Stockholm. It was dissolved in 1976.

The heritage of DA has been passed on by Contra, a foundation which publishes a magazine by the same name. It takes libertarian and conservative positions and claims credit for introducing the ideas of Milton Friedman in Sweden.

Leading members of DA have been Carl G. Holm, founder of the magazine Contra, and Tommy Hansson, currently editor of Contra.
