= Democratic People's Party =

Democratic People's Party may refer to:

- People's Democratic Party of Afghanistan, now abolished
- Democratic People's Party (Germany)
- Democratic People's Party (Ghana)
- Democratic People's Party (Mauritania)
- Democratic People's Party (Montenegro), a member of the Democratic Front coalition
- Democratic People's Party (Namibia)
- Democratic People's Party (Northern Cyprus)
- Democratic People's Party (Nigeria)
- Social Democratic Party (Portugal), known as the Democratic Peoples' Party from 1974 to 1976
- Democratic People's Party (San Marino)
- Democratic People's Party (South Korea)
- Democratic People's Party (Turkey)
- Loktantrik Janata Dal (India)

== See also ==
- Democratic Party (disambiguation)
- People's Party (disambiguation)
- People's Democratic Party (disambiguation)
