= Democratic Alliance Party =

The Democratic Alliance Party is the name of several parties:

- Democratic Alliance Party (Albania)
- Democratic Alliance Party (Haiti)
- Democratic Alliance Party (Solomon Islands)
- Democratic Alliance Party (Tunisia)
- Democratic Party (Cook Islands), previously known as "Democratic Alliance Party"
