= New National Party =

New National Party may refer to:

- New National Party (Grenada)
- New National Party (Netherlands)
- New National Party (Germany)
- New National Party (South Africa)
- New National Party (South Korea)
- New National Party (Barbados)
- New National Party, a proposed name for the National Democratic Party (Egypt)

== See also ==
- New Nation Party, an unregistered political party in New Zealand
- National Party (disambiguation)
