= Alde =

Alde may refer to:

- Alde Mudflats, nature reserve in Suffolk, England
- River Alde, Suffolk, England
- Alde Valley School, Leiston, Suffolk, England
- Alliance of Liberals and Democrats for Europe Party, a European political party
- Alliance of Liberals and Democrats, a former political party in Romania

== People with the name ==
- Edward Allde, English printer
- Alda of Alania, 11th-century Alan princess
- John Allde, Scottish stationer and printer
- Yvette Alde (1911–1967), French artist

== See also ==
- ALDE (disambiguation)
