= Action Party =

Action Party may refer to a number of political parties:

== Active parties ==
- Action Party (Morocco)
- Action Party for Animal Welfare
- Action Party for Development
- Action Party for the Independence of Kurdistan
- Action (Italian political party)
- ActionSA
- Aksyon Demokratiko
- Guyana Action Party
- People's Action Party
- Sardinian Action Party

== Defunct parties ==
- Action Party (Italy, 1853)
- Action Party (Italy)
- Action Party (Latvia)
- Action Party (UK)
- Canadian Action Party
- Liberian Action Party
