= Christian Democratic Party (Namibia) =

- Leader: Piet Junius

The Christian Democratic Party was a political party in Namibia. It is known for its centrist and Christian democratic values. Led by Petrus "Piet" Matheus Junius, the Christian Democratic Union merged into CDP, strengthening its political presence in the country.

It was part of the Democratic Turnhalle Alliance of Namibia (DTA), along with many other small/regional parties including the Democratic Turnhalle Party and the National Unity Democratic Organization (NUDO). The DTA was set up as a South African-supported opposition group to the pro-independence SWAPO movement/party. In 2017, the DTA changed its name to the Popular Democratic Movement (PDM).

In October 1989, the party was a signatory to the report of the UN Security Council concerning the question of Namibia.

== See also ==
- List of political parties in Namibia
