= John F. Pollard =

British historian and academic

John Francis Pollard (born 23 November 1944) is a British historian, an emeritus fellow of Trinity Hall, Cambridge, fellow of the Royal Historical Society, and Emeritus Professor of Modern European History at Anglia Ruskin University. His research interests include fascist and neo-fascist movements, the ideology of present-day neo-Nazism, political and social Catholicism and history of the nineteenth and twentieth century Italy and the Papacy.

== Biography ==
Pollard was born in South Shields, County Durham, on 23 November 1944. After graduating from South Shields Grammar-Technical School for Boys, he studied history at Trinity Hall, Cambridge, where he took his B.A. Degree in 1966 and M.A. in 1970. Pollard completed his PhD at the University of Reading, with a Doctoral thesis on fascism – From the Conciliazione to the Riconciliazione: The Church and the Fascist Regime in Italy, 1929 to 1932. In 1990, he received the title of Professor of Modern European History at Anglia Polytechnic University (APU). He took early retirement from APU in 2003, but continues to teach undergraduate and graduate students as a Supervisor in the Faculty of History of the University of Cambridge. In 2019, he was awarded the degree of Doctor of Letters (Litt.D.) by the University of Cambridge.

== Notable publications ==
- 2014 The Papacy in the Age of Totalitarianism, 1914-1958, Oxford University Press
- Pollard, John F. (2008). "Clerical Fascism: Context, Overview and Conclusion". Clerical Fascism in Interwar Europe. London-New York: Routledge. pp. 221–234. ISBN 9781317968993.
- 2007 Catholicism in Modern Italy: Religion, Politics and Society, 1861-2005, Routledge
- 2005 Money and the Rise of the Modern Papacy: Financing the Vatican, 1850-1950, Cambridge University Press
- 1999 The Unknown Pope: Benedict XV (1914-1922) and the Pursuit of Peace, Geoffrey Chapman
- 1998 The Fascist Experience in Italy, Routledge
- 1985 The Vatican and Italian Fascism, 1929-1932: A Study in Conflict, Cambridge University Press
