= Leslie Ramsammy =

Guyanese politician

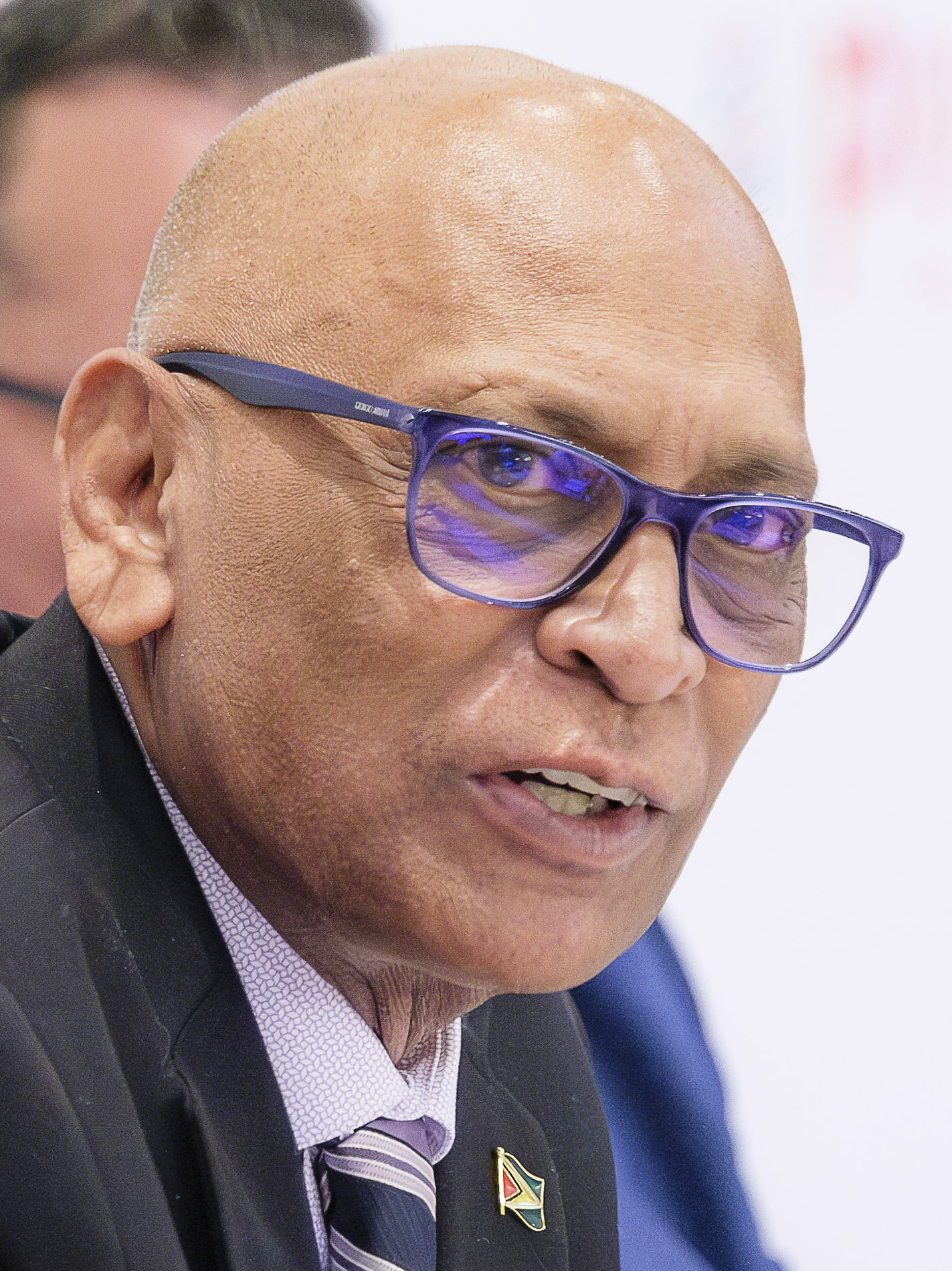
- Ramsammy in 2024

Minister of Agriculture, Guyana
- In office November 2011 – 2015

Personal details
- Occupation: Politician

Leslie Ramsammy is a Guyanese politician who is a member of the National Assembly.

He was appointed minister of agriculture on 28 November 2011, after the general elections, and served until 2015.

== Career ==
Though Ramsammy initially aspired to be a journalist, he travelled to the United States of America to study microbiology. After this, he returned to Guyana during a time of political transition where he says he got "caught up in the development." Since then, he has served in a wide range of public office positions.

Prior to his appointment as agriculture minister, Ramsammy served as Guyana’s Minister of Health for approximately 10 years, making him one of the longest serving ministers of health in the world. During that time, he participated in various international fora and groupings.

At the global and American regional levels, Ramsammy has served as the President of the World Health Assembly and the PAHO Directing Council, and he was the representative for Latin America and the Caribbean on the Board of the Global Fund to fight AIDS, Tuberculosis, and Malaria.

At the Caribbean regional level, he has been Chairman of the Caribbean Community’s Council for Human and Social Development, Chair of the Caucus of CARICOM Ministers responsible for Health, and was recently named Chairman of the Executive Board of the newly established Caribbean Public Health Agency, CARPHA, which aims to integrate the current CARICOM specialized centres and more efficiently and effectively address the regional public health needs of CARICOM countries.

From January to March 2015, Ramsammy was a Menschel Senior Leadership Fellow at the Harvard T.H. Chan School of Public Health. In this role, he taught a course in the Department of Global Health and Population titled, "Politics, Public Health, and the Right to Health."

== Ideology ==
During his time as President of the 61st World Health Assembly, Ramsammy was allowed to vocalise some of his key philosophies on public health. He believes that global health must be prioritized by Member States, that countries must be clear about their ambitions, and calls for global resources to be mobilized for more equitable health.
