= Peoples National Party (disambiguation) =

People's National Party or Peoples National Party may refer to:

== Current ==
- People's National Party in Jamaica
- People's National Party (Russia)
- People's National Party (Tonga)
- United Kashmir People's National Party
- Awami National Party, in Pakistan, sometimes called the People's National Party
- Kuomintang, Republic of China, is sometimes translated in English as the People's National Party
- Kongunadu Makkal Desia Katchi (lit. 'Kongunadu People's National Party'), Kongu Nadu, India

== Historical ==
- People's National Party (Belize)
- People's National Party (Fiji)
- People's National Party (Ghana)

== See also ==
- Peoples Party (disambiguation)
- National Party (disambiguation)
