= Mark Biondich =

Canadian historian

Mark Biondich is a Canadian historian specializing in Southeast Europe, especially former Yugoslavia, with an emphasis on nationalism. He holds a Ph.D. from the University of Toronto. In 1999–2000 he conducted research at the USHMM.

== Works ==
- Biondich, Mark (2007a). "Controversies Surrounding the Catholic Church in Wartime Croatia, 1941–45". The Independent State of Croatia 1941-45. Routledge. pp. 31–59. ISBN 9780415440554.
- Biondich, Mark (2007b). "Radical Catholicism and Fascism in Croatia, 1918–1945". Totalitarian Movements and Political Religions. 8 (2): 383–399. doi:10.1080/14690760701321346. S2CID 145148083.
- Biondich, Mark (2006). "Controversies Surrounding the Catholic Church in Wartime Croatia, 1941–45". Totalitarian Movements and Political Religions. 7 (4): 429–457. doi:10.1080/14690760600963222. S2CID 143351253.
- Biondich, Mark (2005). "Religion and Nation in Wartime Croatia: Reflections on the Ustaša Policy of Forced Religious Conversions, 1941-1942". The Slavonic and East European Review. 83 (1): 71–116. doi:10.1353/see.2005.0063. JSTOR 4214049. S2CID 151704526.
- Biondich, Mark (2002). "Persecution of Roma-Sinti in Croatia, 1941-1945". Roma and Sinti. Under-Studied Victims of Nazism: 33–47.
- Biondich, Mark: The Croat Peasant Party, and the Politics of Mass Mobilization, 1904-1928 Toronto: University of Toronto Press, 2000. https://doi.org/10.3138/9781442680203
