= National Union (Poland) =

National Union Związek Narodowy (Polish)
- Leader: Jarogniew Drwęski
- Founded: June 1910
- Dissolved: 1914
- Newspaper: Dziennik Poznański; Przegląd Wielkopolski
- Membership: 430
- Ideology: Conservatism

The National Union (Polish: Związek Narodowy, ZN) was a Polish political organization functioning in the Prussian partition founded by conservative landowners to oppose the National Democratic (Endecja) movement and its anti-German orientation. ZN accused Endecja's political organizations (Polish Democratic Society, National League) of radicalism.
