= National Republican Party (disambiguation) =

The National Republican Party was a political party in the United States 1824–1834.

National Republican Party may also refer to:

- National Republican Party (Costa Rica), 1901–1952
- National Republican Party (El Salvador), 1930–1931
- National Republican Party (Guyana), 1990–2000
- National Republican Party (Portugal), 1918–1923
- National Republican Party of Russia, 1990–1998
- National Republican Party (Spain), 1895–1897
