= Workers' Socialist Party =

Workers' Socialist Party may refer to:

- Workers' Socialist Party (Bolivia) (1970s)
- Workers Socialist Party of Bolivia (1940)
- Workers' Socialist Party (Chile) (1940-1944)
- Workers' Socialist Party (Mexico) (1975-1987)
- Workers' Socialist Party (Panama)
- Partido Socialista de los Trabajadores (Spain) (1979-1993)
- Workers and Socialist Party (South Africa)
