= Unity Party =

The Unity Party is the name of several political parties around the world, including:

Current-day parties with that name include:

- Unity Party of America
- Unity Party (Australia)
- Unity Party (Azerbaijan)
- Unity Party (Hungary, 2009)
- Unity (Haiti) (Inite), est. 2009
- Unity Party of Kenya (UPK, est. 2011)
- Unity (Latvian political party)
- Unity Party (Liberia)
- Unity Party (Sierra Leone)
- Unity (Slovenia) (Sloga), est. 2018
- Unity Party (South Ossetia)
- Unity (Sweden) (Enhet)

Historical parties of the name include:

- Batasuna ("Unity")
- British Columbia Unity Party
- Ihud
- Latvian Unity Party
- Unity (Northern Ireland)
- Unity (Russian political party)
- Unity (Ukraine)
- Unity Party (China)
- Unity Party (Hungary)
- Unity Party (Israel)
- Unity Party (Japan)
- Unity Party of Nigeria (UPN, active 1978-1983)
- Unity Party (Quebec)
- Unity Party (Turkey)
- Yedinstvo, a faction within the Russian Social Democratic Labor Party

== Afghanistan ==
- Islamic Unity Party of Afghanistan
- National Islamic Unity Party of Afghanistan
- People's Islamic Unity Party of Afghanistan

== See also ==
- National Unity Party (disambiguation)
- Socialist Unity Party (disambiguation)
- United Party (disambiguation)
