= National Defence University =

National Defence (or Defense) University (or College) may refer to:

Alphabetical by country

== University ==
- Marshal Fahim National Defense University, Afghanistan
- National Defense University (Azerbaijan)
- People's Liberation Army National Defense University, China
- National Defence University (Finland)
- Supreme National Defense University, Iran
- National Defense University (Kazakhstan)
- National Defence University of Malaysia
- National Defence University (Nepal), Banepa, Nepal
- National Defence University (Pakistan)
- National Defence University of Warsaw, Poland
- Carol I National Defence University, Romania
- Korea National Defense University, South Korea
- National Defense University (Republic of China), Taiwan
- National Defense University (Turkey)
- National Defence University of Ukraine
- National Defense University (United States)

== College ==
- National Defence College (Bangladesh)
- National Defense College of Cuba
- National Defence College (India)
- National Defense College (Israel)
- National Defence College, Kenya
- National Defence College (Myanmar)
- National Defence College, Nigeria
- National Defense College of the Philippines
- National Defence College, Sri Lanka
- National Defence College of Thailand
- National Defence College, Uganda
- National Defense College of the United Arab Emirates
- Joint Service Defence College, formerly the National Defence College, United Kingdom

== See also ==
- NATO Defence College
- Royal Military College (disambiguation)
- Staff College
