= Action Party for the Independence of Kurdistan =

Action Party for the Independence of Kurdistan Parti Kari Sarbakhoy Kurdistan
- Leader: Yousif Hanna Yousif
- Founder: Mohammed Hussein Halleq
- Split from: Iraqi Communist Party
- Ideology: Kurdish nationalism Self-determination; Marxism–Leninism
- Political position: Left-wing

The Action Party for the Independence of Kurdistan (Kurmanji Kurdish: Parti Kari Sarbakhoy Kurdistan / Party Khabat bo Serbogoy Kurdistan) is a political party in Kurdistan Region. It is part of the Kurdistan Regional Government.

The party split from the Iraqi Communist Party and became affiliated with the Patriotic Union of Kurdistan. Its founder, Mohammed Hussein Halleq, was murdered in 1995. His successor, Yousif Hanna Yousif, or Abu Hikmat, joined the Kurdistan Democratic Party of Iraq-led government as a minister.
