= Homeland Party =

Homeland Party may refer to:

- Homeland Party (Iran), a defunct Iranian political party
- Homeland Party (Turkey), a Turkish political party
- Homeland Party (Turkey, 2021), a Turkish political party
- Homeland Party (Egypt), an Islamist political party in Egypt
- Homeland Party (Libya), an Islamist political party in Libya
- Homeland Party (Armenia), a political party in Armenia
- Homeland Party (UK), a fascist political party in the United Kingdom

== See also ==
- Our Homeland Movement, a far-right political party in Hungary
