= National Progressive Party =

National Progressive Party may refer to:

- National Progressive Party (Carniola), Austria-Hungary, 1894 - after 1918
- National Progressive Party (Finland), 1918–1951
- National Progressive Party (Greece), founded 1950; see List of political parties in Greece
- National Progressive Party (Kiribati), fl.2003
- National Progressive Party (Laos), 1950–1958
- National Progressive Party (Lesotho), fl.2002
- National Progressive Party (Montserrat), founded before 1991
- National Progressive Party (Namibia), founded 1988
- National Progressive Party (New South Wales), Australia, 1913
- National Progressive Party (Panama), 1959–1968
- National Progressive Party (Sint Maarten), Netherlands Antilles, fl.2002
- National Progressive Party (Zambia), Zambia, fl.1964
- National Progressives of America, United States, founded 1938

== See also ==
- Progressive Party (disambiguation)
- Progressive National Party (disambiguation)
- National Party (disambiguation)
