= Liberal Alliance =

Liberal Alliance may refer to:

- Liberal Alliance (Chile), a historical political party in Chile
- Liberal Alliance (Denmark), a political party in Denmark, formerly known as New Alliance
- Liberal Alliance (Greece), a political party in Greece
- Liberal Alliance of Montenegro, a former political party in Montenegro
- Nicaraguan Liberal Alliance, a political party in Nicaragua

== See also ==
- Alliance of Liberals and Democrats for Europe, a political grouping in the European Parliament
- SDP-Liberal Alliance, a former electoral alliance in the United Kingdom
- Alliance Party of Northern Ireland, a liberal political party in Northern Ireland
- GSLP–Liberal Alliance, a political alliance in Gibraltar
