= National People's Party =

The National People's Party may refer to:

- National People's Party (Bangladesh), see List of political parties in Bangladesh
- National People's Party (Curaçao)
- National People's Party (Czechoslovakia)
- National People's Party (The Gambia)
- German National People's Party
- National People's Party (Greece), see National Radical Party (Greece)
- Indian National Lok Dal
- National People's Party (India)
- Rashtriya Janata Dal (National People's Party), party in the state of Bihar, India
- Rashtriya Lok Dal (National People's Party), India
- Rashtravadi Janata Party (Nationalist People's Party), India
- Rashtriya Samaj Paksha (National People's Party), party in the state of Maharashtra, India
- National People's Party (Indonesia)
- National People's Party (Norway)
- National People's Party (Pakistan)
- National People's Party (Rhodesia), see Rhodesian general election, 1965
- National People's Party (Sierra Leone), see Sierra Leonean general election, 1996
- National People's Party (South Africa, 1981), which later became the Minority Front
- National People's Party (South Africa, 2007)
- National People's Party (Sri Lanka), see List of political parties in Sri Lanka
- Kuomintang (Taiwan), sometimes translated as National People's Party
- National People's Party (Zimbabwe)

== See also ==
- National Popular Party (disambiguation)
