= Joint Service Defence College =

- The Joint Service Defence College Crest
- Former names: Joint Services Staff College (1947–71); National Defence College (1971–83)
- Type: Staff college
- Active: 1947–1997
- Campus: Latimer (1947–1983) Greenwich (1983–1997)

The Joint Service Defence College (JSDC) was a training academy for military personnel from 1947 to 1997. It has since been amalgamated into the Joint Services Command and Staff College.

== History ==
The college was established as the Joint Services Staff College (JSSC) in 1947 with Rear Admiral Cyril Douglas-Pennant as its first commandant. It was based at Latimer House in Latimer, Buckinghamshire. It was renamed the National Defence College (NDC) in 1971. On 12 February 1974, the IRA detonated a bomb at the NDC; there were no fatalities. In 1983, the NDC was renamed the Joint Service Defence College (JSDC), and moved to the Royal Naval College, Greenwich. The college was closed in 1997 and amalgamated into the new Joint Services Command and Staff College.

== Staff and students ==
The Commandant was a Major-general or equivalent. Senior Directing Staff included Royal Navy, British Army, Royal Air Force, civilian colonels and equivalent: civilian G5 or Assistant Secretary (Counsellor). Officers attending the course, which focussed on managing tri-service operations, were typically of lieutenant-colonel rank or equivalent and had to have the potential to rise at least two grades in rank. Three courses, each of nine months, were held every two years, each with 60 officers (typically 17 from each service plus 9 others from the civil service or the police). Those officers passing the course, or serving on the directing staff for at least six months, received the letters jsdc. The majority of students went on to joint, central staff or international appointments. The crest featured a cormorant, which was also the name of the college magazine.

== Alumni ==
=== Air Force ===
- Air Commodore Maqbool Rabb, 5th Chief of Staff (Pakistan)
- Air Chief Marshal Arjan Singh, 6th Chief of the Air Staff (India).
- Air Marshal Asghar Khan, 1st Commander-in-Chief of the Pakistan Air Force.
- Air Chief Marshal Lewis Hodges

=== Army ===
- General Yakubu Gowon, 3rd Head of State of Nigeria and first Chief of Army Staff (Nigeria).
- Major General Akbar Khan, Chief of the General Staff, Pakistan Army. Ringleader of the Rawalpindi conspiracy.

=== Navy ===
- Vice Admiral Nilakanta Krishnan, 2nd Flag Officer Commanding-in-Chief Eastern Naval Command (India).
- Vice Admiral A. R. Khan, 3rd Commander-in-Chief of the Pakistan Navy
- Vice Admiral S. M. Ahsan, 4th Commander-in-Chief of the Pakistan Navy
- Vice Admiral Muzaffar Hassan, 5th Commander-in-Chief of the Pakistan Navy

== See also ==
- National Defence College (disambiguation)
