= Civic Democratic Party (disambiguation) =

The Civic Democratic Party is a political party in the Czech Republic.

Civic Democratic Party may also refer to:

- Civic Democratic Party (Bosnia and Herzegovina), a political party in Bosnia
- Civic Democratic Party (Slovakia), former Slovak wing of the party in Czechoslovakia
- Civic Democratic Party (Hungary), a political party in Hungary
- Civic Democratic Party (Lithuania), a political party in Lithuania
- Civic Democratic Party (Serbia), a former political party in Serbia
