= People's Alliance =

People's Alliance may refer to:

- People's Alliance (Volksunie), Belgian political party which split in 2001 into the Nieuw-Vlaamse Alliantie and Spirit
- People's Alliance (Bulgaria), a Bulgarian party from 1921 to 1923
- People's Alliance (Iceland), an electoral alliance in Iceland from 1956 to 1968 and a political party from 1968 to 1998
- Pakatan Rakyat, an informal Malaysian political coalition known as the People's Alliance
- People's Alliance (Maldives), a political party in the Maldives, created in 2008
- Progress Party (Russia), formerly known as the People's Alliance
- People's Alliance for Reform, a political alliance in Singapore
- People's Alliance (Sri Lanka), a political front led by Sri Lanka Freedom Party
- People's Alliance (Spain), conservative political party in Spain, formed by a group of Franco's partisans after his death
- People's Alliance (Turkey), an electoral alliance in Turkey, established in February 2018 between the AKP and MHP
- Peoples Alliance [sic], a 2003 UK political party re-formed as The New Party
- The People's Alliance (Durham, NC), a progressive grassroots consumer watchdog organization in Durham, North Carolina
- People's Alliance (Fiji), a Fijian political party

== See also ==
- People's Alliance Party (disambiguation)
- People's Alliance of New Brunswick, a political party in Canada, created in 2010
- People's Alliance for Democracy, a Thai political movement and pressure group
- People's Alliance for Gupkar Declaration, a political party in Jammu and Kashmir, India
- Popular Alliance (disambiguation)
- United People's Freedom Alliance, Sri Lanka
