= National Unity Movement =

The National Unity Movement is the name of several political parties:

- National Unity Movement (Nicaragua)
- National Unity Movement, see 1996 Sierra Leonean general election
- National Unity Movement of Equatorial Guinea, see 1968 Spanish Guinean general election
- Russian National Unity movement

== See also ==
- Democratic National Union Movement, a Cambodian political party
- National Solidarity Movement of Afghanistan
