= Blue Party =

Blue Party may refer to:

- The Blue Party (Germany), a national conservative party in Germany
- Blue Party (Dominican Republic), a historical political party in the Dominican Republic
- Parti bleu, a historical political party in pre-Confederation Canada
- Semayawi Party, also known as the Blue party, a defunct political party in Ethiopia
- Political colour § Blue for a general discussion of the use of the color blue by political parties

== See also ==
- New Blue Party of Ontario, a minor conservative party in Ontario, Canada
