= Workers' League =

There have been several political parties named the Workers League:

- Workers League (Lebanon) (Toilers League)
- Workers League (UK), a split from the International Socialists (UK)
- Workers League (US), now known as the Socialist Equality Party
