= United Democratic Party (Myanmar) =

Burmese political party

The United Democratic Party (Burmese: ညီညွတ်သောဒီမိုကရက်တစ်ပါတီ; abbreviated UDP) was a Burmese political party. The party was registered in May 2010, and dissolved by Myanmar's Union Election Commission in October 2020, for possessing illegal funds. UDP was also known as the Rose Party for the rose featured in its party logo. The party had courted enduring scrutiny for its controversial ties to Michael Kyaw Myint, a convicted businessman with ties to the United Wa State Party.

== History ==
UDP was first registered with the Union Election Commission (UEC) in May 2010 to contest seats in the 2010 Myanmar general election. In the 2010 and 2015 elections, UDP won no seats. In the 2020 Myanmar general election, the party had planned to contest 1,130 constituencies, second only to the ruling National League for Democracy (NLD) and more than the opposition Union Solidarity and Development Party. On 17 October 2020, the Union Election Commission formally dissolved the party, finding that the party had violated the Political Parties Registration Law, which prohibits political parties from using funds from foreign governments, organisations, and religious institutions.

In October 2021, in the aftermath of the 2021 Myanmar coup d'état, the military-run Myanma Alin newspaper published an op-ed criticising the civilian government's decision to disband UDP. On 9 February 2023, the UEC permitted the party to re-register, after ex-party members submitted filings under two names: "Union Democracy Party" and "Union Development Party." The re-registered party will retain the same party logo and policy platform.
