= People's Action Party (disambiguation) =

The People's Action Party is a major conservative centre-right political party in Singapore.

People's Action Party may also refer to:

- People's Action Party (Cameroon); see Paul Abine Ayah
- People's Action Party (Ghana, 1969–1970)
- People's Action Party (Ghana, 2018–2022)
- Niue People's Party (formerly the Niue People's Action Party)
- People's Action Party (Papua New Guinea)
- People's Action (Romania)
- People's Action Party (Vanuatu)
- People's Action Party of Vietnam, an exile group
