= United Workers Party (Guyana) =

The United Workers Party (UWP) was a political party in Guyana.

== History ==
The UWP was established in 1991. In the 1992 general elections it received just 77 votes and failed to win a seat. The party did not contest any further elections.
