= Democratic Alliance =

Democratic Alliance may refer to:

== Current political parties ==
- Democratic Alliance for the Betterment and Progress of Hong Kong
- Democratic Alliance (Portugal, 2024)
- Democratic Alliance (South Africa)
- Democratic Alliance (Ukraine)
- Democratic Alliance (Venezuela)
- Democratic Alliance List, Palestine
- Democratic Alliance Party (Haiti)
- DEMOS (Montenegro)
- National Democratic Alliance, India
- Democratic Alliance of Nagaland, India
- Singapore Democratic Alliance

== Defunct political parties or coalitions ==
- British Columbia Democratic Alliance
- Democratic Alliance (Hong Kong)
- Democratic Alliance (Bulgaria)
- Democratic Alliance of Chile
- Democratic Alliance (Chile, 1983)
- Democratic Alliance for Egypt
- Democratic Alliance (Greece)
- Democratic Alliance (Guinea-Bissau)
- Democratic Alliance (Italy)
- Democratic Alliance (Palestine)
- Democratic Alliance (Philippines)
- Democratic Alliance (Portugal, 1979)
- Democratic Alliance (Quebec)
- Democratic Alliance (Sweden)
- Democratic Republican Alliance, France
- Democratic Progressive Alliance, India (now Secular Progressive Alliance)

== See also ==
- Alliance for Democracy (disambiguation)
- Democratic Alliance Party (disambiguation)
- Democratic Coalition (disambiguation)
- Democratic Movement (disambiguation)
- Democratic Party (disambiguation)
- Democratic Union (disambiguation)
- National Democratic Alliance (disambiguation)
