= Social Christian Party =

Social Christian Party may refer to:

- Social Christian Party (Bolivia)
- Social Christian Party (Brazil)
- Social Christian Party (Ecuador)
- Social Christian Party (Italy)
- Social Christian Party (Nicaragua)
- Social Christian Party (Ukraine)

== See also ==
- Christian Social Party (disambiguation)
