= Socialist Workers Party =

Socialist Workers Party may refer to:

- Flemish Socialist Workers Party
- Estonian Socialist Workers' Party
- German Socialist Labour Party in Poland – Left
- Hungarian Socialist Workers' Party
- Hungarian Socialist Workers' Party (1993)
- Independent Socialist Workers Party, Czechoslovakia
- Italian Socialist Workers' Party
- Jewish Socialist Workers Party, Russian Empire
- Luxembourg Socialist Workers' Party
- Polish Socialist Workers Party
- Revolutionary Socialist Workers' Party (France)
- Revolutionary Socialist Workers' Party (Turkey)
- Socialist Workers Party (Algeria)
- Socialist Workers' Party (Argentina)
- Socialist Workers Party (Australia)
- Socialist Workers' Party (Belgium)
- Socialist Workers' Party (Chile)
- Socialist Workers Party (Croatia)
- Socialist Workers Party (Cuba)
- Socialist Workers Party (Denmark)
- Socialist Workers Party (Finland)
- Socialist Workers' Party (Greece)
- Socialist Workers Party (India)
- Socialist Workers Network – until 2018, the Irish Socialist Workers' Party was known as the SWP
- Socialist Workers' Party (Mexico)
- Socialist Workers' Party (Netherlands, 1959)
- Socialist Workers Party (Palestine)
- Socialist Workers Party (Peru), founded 1971, member of LIT-CI
- Socialist Workers Party (United States)
- Socialist Workers Party (UK)
- Socialist Workers' Party of China
- Socialist Workers' Party of Finland
- Socialist Workers' Party of Germany
- Socialist Workers' Party of Greece
- Socialist Workers Party of Hungary
- Socialist Workers' Party of Sweden
- Socialist Workers' Party of Yugoslavia (communists)
- Spanish Socialist Workers' Party
- United Jewish Socialist Workers Party, Russian Empire and Poland
- United Socialist Workers' Party, Brazil
- Zionist Socialist Workers Party, Russian Empire and Poland

== See also ==
- National Socialist Workers Party (disambiguation)
- Workers' Socialist Party (disambiguation)
- List of socialist parties
