= Social Democratic Union =

Social Democratic Union may refer to:

- Social Democratic Union (Croatia)
- Social Democratic Union (Ireland), started by Tommy Broughan in 2014 after he left the Labour Party
- Social Democratic Union (Latvia)
- Social Democratic Union (Serbia)
- Social Democratic Union (Romania)
- Social Democratic Union (Ukraine)
- Social Democratic Union of Macedonia
- Social Democratic Union of Workers and Smallholders, a political party in Finland
- Social Democratic Union 'Proletarian', a political party in Bulgaria
- Social Democratic Unionists, a political party in Syria
- Polish Social Democratic Union, defunct political party in Poland
