= National Action Party =

National Action Party may refer to:

- National Action Party (El Salvador) (Partido Acción Nacional)
- National Action Party (Mexico) (Partido Acción Nacional)
- National Action Party (Nicaragua) (Partido Acción Nacional)
- National Action Party (Turkey) (Milliyetçi Hareket Partisi)
- National Action Party (UK)

== See also ==
- Action Party (disambiguation)
- National Action (disambiguation)
- National Socialist Action Party, a British neo-Nazi political party in the early 1980s
