= Christian Democratic Union (Namibia) =

Political party in Namibia

- Leader: Andrew Kloppers
- Founded: 1982
- Dissolved: 1989
- Merger of: Liberal Party and Democratic People's Party
- Merged into: Christian Democratic Party
- Ideology: Christian democracy
- Member of: Democratic Turnhalle Alliance (1982–1988)

The Christian Democratic Union was a political party in Namibia led by Andrew Kloppers.

== History ==
It was formed in 1982 through a merger of the Liberal Party and the Democratic People's Party. The party joined the Democratic Turnhalle Alliance.

A section of the Liberal Party reconstituted its party under the leadership of Barney Barnes, and stayed out of the alliance.

In 1988, the CDU broke with the alliance.

In March 1989, the CDU merged into Christian Democratic Party.

== See also ==
- List of political parties in Namibia
