= Conservative People's Party =

Conservative People's Party may refer to:

- Conservative People's Party (Argentina)
- Conservative People's Party (Bohemia), a political party in the 1900s and 1910s
- Conservative People's Party (Denmark)
- Conservative People's Party of Estonia
- Conservative People's Party (Germany), a short-lived party of the late 1920s and early 1930s
- Conservative People's Party (Poland)
- Swiss Conservative People's Party, predecessor of the Christian Democratic People's Party of Switzerland

== See also ==
- Conservative Party (disambiguation)
- People's Party (disambiguation)
