= National Socialist Party =

National Socialist Party most often refers to the National Socialist German Workers' Party (German: Nationalsozialistische Deutsche Arbeiterpartei, NSDAP), commonly known as the Nazi Party, which existed in Germany between 1920 and 1945 and ruled the country from 1933 to 1945. However, similar names have also been used by a number of other political parties around the world, with various ideologies, some related and some unrelated to the NSDAP.

National Socialist Party may also refer to:

== Asia ==
- Chinese National Socialist Party, China (democratic socialist, unrelated to the NSDAP)
- Đại Việt National Socialist Party, 1936-1945, Vietnam (pro-Japanese, monarchist, nationalist)
- Iranian National Socialist Party (est. 1952) (pro-Hitler, antisemitic (against both Arabs and Jews))
- Jatiyo Samajtantrik Dal (National Socialist Party), Bangladesh (Nationalist, historically socialist)
- National Revolutionary Socialist Party, India (Marxist/Leftist)
- National Socialism Association, Taiwan (neo-Nazi)
- National Socialist Council of Nagaland, India (Maoist)
- National Socialist Japanese Workers' Party, Japan (nationalist, neo-Nazi)
- National Socialist Party (Jordan), 1954–1957 (socialist)
- National Socialist Party (Philippines), 1935–1936 (nationalist)
- National Socialist Party (Thailand), 1957–1958 (pro-military)
- National Socialist Party of Tripura, India (Tripuri nationalist)
- Syrian Social Nationalist Party (secular, nationalist, pro-Syria)

== Africa ==
- South African Gentile National Socialist Movement (German-style National Socialist, antisemitic, pro-White African)

== Europe ==
- National Socialist Freedom Movement, formed by Nazi Party members in the aftermath of the Beer Hall Putsch, which saw the Nazi Party being outlawed.
- Austrian National Socialism (pan-German nationalist)
- Bulgarian National Socialist Party (Bulgarian, antisemitic)
- National Socialist Workers' Party of Denmark (German-style National Socialist, antisemitic)
- National-Social Association, in Germany, founded by Friedrich Naumann in 1896. It is unrelated to Nazism. (Social liberal, progressive, pro-Germany, anti-Marxist)
- Greek National Socialist Party (Italian-style fascist, pro-Hitler)
- Hungarian National Socialist Party (one of several such groups, 1920s-40s) (German-style National Socialist, antisemitic)
- National Socialist Party (UK), a breakaway group from the British Socialist Party formed in 1916; historically Marxist, it reverted to a previous name as the Social Democratic Federation in 1919 and then merged with the Labour Party
- National Socialist League (United Kingdom) (United Kingdom 1930s) (British, pro-Hitler)
- National Socialist Action Party (United Kingdom, est. 1982) (British, possibly anti-immigrant)
- National Socialist Dutch Workers Party (favoured German annexation of the Netherlands)
- Nasjonal Samling (Norway) (German-style National Socialist, antisemitic, anti-Masonic)
- National Socialist Workers' Party of Norway (German-style Nazi, antisemitic)
- Russian National Socialist Party (Russian nationalist, fascist, theocratic (Orthodox Christian), socialist, anti-immigrant)
- Italian National Socialist Workers' Party (Italian nationalist, antisemitic, anti-immigrant)
- Czech National Social Party, a civic nationalist and moderate left-wing party known as the Czechoslovak National Socialist Party between 1926 and 1948
- German National Socialist Workers' Party (Czechoslovakia) (Sudeten German, antisemitic)
- Sudeten German National Socialist Party (Sudeten German, pro-annexation-by-Germany)
- Czech National Socialist Party (Socialist)
- Czechoslovak National Socialist Party (Liberal socialist)
- National Socialist Party (Romania) (German-style National Socialist)
- Swedish National Socialist Farmers' and Workers' Party (Agrarism, pro-Hitler)
- National Socialist People's Party of Sweden (Italian/German style fascist/National Socialist)
- National Socialist Workers' Party (Sweden) (started as a German-style National Socialist party, but became more leftist and independently Swedish before declining during WWII)
- Klaipėda Region Christian Socialists Workers' Union (German-Lithuanian National Socialist party of the Klaipėda Region)

== North America ==
- American Nazi Party, founded by George Lincoln Rockwell
- National Socialist League (United States) ("Aryan", pro-Hitler) (1974–1984)
- National Socialist Party of America (white, antisemitic, anti-black) (1970–1981)
- National Unity Party of Canada (pro-Anglo-Canadian/French-Canadian), known at one point as the Canadian National Socialist Unity Party (1930s-1940s)

== South America ==
- National Socialist Movement of Chile (pro-Hitler, fascist)
- Frente Nacional Socialista Argentino (Neo-Nazi)

== Oceania ==
- National Socialist Party of Australia (neo-Nazi organisation) (1967–1977)
- National Socialist Party of New Zealand (German-style National Socialist, antisemitic (both anti-Arab and antisemitic)) (1969–1980)

== See also ==
- Independent National Socialism
- National Socialist Movement (disambiguation)
- National Socialist Workers Party (disambiguation)
- List of socialist parties
- Nazism
- Neo-Nazism
- Republican Fascist Party
