= Red Party =

Red Party may refer to

- Red Party (Canada)
- Red Party (Dominican Republic)
- Red Party (Norway)
- Red Party (Paraguay) (Partido Colorado)
- Red Party (Taiwan)
- Red Party (UK)
- Red Party (Uruguay) (Partido Colorado)
- Political colour § Red for a general discussion of the use of the color red by political parties
