= National Union (Italy, 1923) =

Italian Catholic political party

National Union Unione Nazionale
- Leader: Carlo Ottavio Cornaggia Medici
- Founded: 1923; 102 years ago
- Ideology: Clerical fascism

National Union (Italian: Unione Nazionale) was a pro-fascist Italian Catholic political party during the 1920s, the first of several "Clerico-Fascist" political organizations established within the decade. The party was established with the permission of Pope Pius XI, dealing the final blow to the anti-fascist Catholic Italian People's Party.

The National Union's membership primarily came from aristocratic and pro-monarchist Catholics in Turin, Milan, and Naples, along with members of the Black Nobility. These groups represented over half of the signatories of the party's April 1923 manifesto. Pollard describes the National Union as "essentially an aristocratic clique". Its manifesto credited fascism with the goal of establishing "a lasting social Christian and Italian order".

According to the pro-Fascist Il Momento of Turin, the party was notorious for its "hostility towards the works and towards trade union organizations".

The National Union, and the similar Centro Nazionale, supported the Fascist list in the March 1929 elections, only to virtually disappear from the political map after the conclusion of the Lateran treaties. The Centro Nazionale dissolved in the summer of 1930, leaving the National Union as the sole remaining "Clerico-Fascist" political party.

== See also ==
- Clerical fascism
- Cornaggia Medici
