= New Alliance Party (disambiguation) =

The New Alliance Party is a former political party in the United States.

New Alliance Party may also refer to:

- New Alliance Party (Mexico), a political party in Mexico
- New Alliance Party (Cook Islands)

== See also ==
- New Alliance (Benin)
- New Alliance (Denmark)
- New Alliance for Democracy and Development in Burundi
