= Alliance of Democrats =

Alliance of Democrats may refer to:

- Alliance of Democrats (Lesotho), a political party in Lesotho
- Alliance of Democrats (Poland), a political party in Poland
- Alliance of Democrats (political international), a loose political international which operated from 2005 to 2012
