= United Party =

United Party is a term used various political parties:

- United Australia Party
- United Party (British Virgin Islands)
- United Party (The Gambia)
- United Party (Ghana)
- United Party of Jamaica
- United Party (Kenya)
- United Party (New Zealand)
- United Party (Papua New Guinea)
- United Party of Retirees and Pensioners, Portugal
- United Party (South Africa)
- United Party (Southern Rhodesia)
- United Party (Zambia)
- United Party for National Development, Zambia

== See also ==
- People's United Party, Belize
- United Democratic Party (disambiguation)
- United Progressive Party (disambiguation)
- United Workers' Party (disambiguation)
- National Unity Party (disambiguation)
