= National Union for Democracy and Progress =

The National Union for Democracy and Progress can refer to:

- National Union for Democracy and Progress (Benin)
- National Union for Democracy and Progress (Cameroon)
- National Union for Democracy and Progress (Central African Republic)
- National Union for Democracy and Progress (Guinea-Bissau)
- National Union for Democracy and Progress (São Tomé and Príncipe)

== See also ==
- National Union for Democratic Progress, Liberian political party
