= New Party =

New Party may refer to:

- New Party (Corrientes), Argentina
- Civic Front of Córdoba, formerly known as New Party against Corruption, for Honesty and Transparence
- New Party (Brazil)
- New Party (Canada)
- New Party (Cyprus)
- New Party (Greece, 1873)
- New Party (Greece, 1947)
- New Party (Hungary)
- New Party Japan
- New Party (Latvia), a defunct political party in Latvia
- New Party (Serbia)
- New Party (Taiwan)
- New Party (Turkey, 1993)
- New Party (Turkey, 2008)
- New Party (Turkey, 2026)
- New Party (UK) - the party of Oswald Mosley
- The New Party (UK, 2003) - the party founded by Robert Durward in 2003
- New Party (United States)
- New Party Sakigake
- Japan New Party
