= United Left =

United Left may refer to:

== Current parties ==
- Estonian United Left Party
- European United Left–Nordic Green Left
- United Left (Chile)
- United Left (Costa Rica)
- United Left (Galicia)
- United Left (Netherlands)
- United Left (Paraguay)
- United Left (San Marino)
- United Left (Spain)
- United Left (Venezuela)
- United Left/The Greens–Assembly for Andalusia

== Former parties ==
- United Left (Argentina)
- United Left (Austria)
- United Left (Bolivia, 1985)
- United Left (Bolivia) (1989–c. 2002)
- United Left (Denmark), the name used 1870–95 by the current-day Venstre
- United Left (East Germany)
- United Left (France) (2009–2015)
- United Left (Greece)
- United Left (Ireland)
- United Left (Peru)
- United Left (Poland)
- United Left (Slovenia)
- United Left Alliance, Ireland
- United Left Front (1967), India
- United Left Front (Nepal, 1990)
- United Left Front (Nepal, 2002)
- United Left for Cusano Milanino
- European United Left (1989–93)
- European United Left (1994–95)

== Other ==
- al-Yesaar al-Mouwahid (The United Left) is the name of the newspaper of the Unified Socialist Party (Morocco).

== See also ==
- Izquierda Unida (disambiguation)
