= Moderate Party (disambiguation) =

The Moderate Party is a liberal-conservative major political party in Sweden.

Moderate Party may also refer to:

== Asia ==
- Moderate Socialists Party, a historic party in Iran
- Moderate leaders, a group of former political leaders in India active between 1885 and 1905.

== Europe ==
- Moderate Party (Spain), a political party in nineteenth-century Spain
- Social Democratic Party (Estonia), known as the "Moderates (Estonian: Mõõdukad)" between 1996 and 2004
- Moderates of Åland, a political party in Finland later Moderate Coalition for Åland
- Moderates (Denmark), a political party founded by former prime minister Lars Løkke Rasmussen

=== Italy ===
- Moderates and Populars, a political party in Italy
- Moderates (Italy), a political party in Italy
- Moderate Party (Italy), a historic party in Italy

=== UK ===
- Moderate Party (Scotland), a group of clerics in the Church of Scotland in the eighteenth century
- Moderate Party (London), the opposition to the Progressive Party in the London County Council and its boroughs which in 1906 became the Municipal Reform Party

== North America ==
- Ontario Moderate Party, a political party in the Canadian province of Ontario

=== US ===
- Moderate Party (Illinois), a former political party made by Bill Scheurer for his campaign for the US House in 2006
- Moderate Party of Rhode Island, the third largest political party in Rhode Island
- Moderate Party (New Jersey), a political party seeking to restore fusion voting in New Jersey founded in 2022

== South America ==
- Moderate Party (Brazil), a nineteenth-century political party in Brazil

== See also ==
- Centre-left politics
- Centre-right politics
