= Christian Social Party =

Christian Social Party may refer to:

- Christian Social Party (Austria)
- Humanist Democratic Centre, Belgian party founded in 1972 formerly known as Christian Social Party
- Christlich Soziale Partei (Belgium), in the German-speaking Community of Belgium
- Christian Social Party (Belgium, 1945–68)
- Christian Social Party (Chile)
- Christian Social Party (Ecuador)
- Christian Social Party (Germany)
- Christian Social Union of Bavaria
- Christian Socialist Party (Hungary)
- Christian Social Party (Liechtenstein)
- Moravian-Silesian Christian Social Party in Moravia
- Christian Social Party (Netherlands)
- Christian Social Party of Obwalden
- Christian Social Party (Switzerland)
- Christian Social Party (Venezuela)

== See also ==
- Social Christian Party (disambiguation)
