= National Alliance (Peru) =

National Alliance (in Spanish: Alianza Nacional), was a right-wing political party in Peru, formed in 1947. The party comprised several groups opposed to the American Popular Revolutionary Alliance and was led by editor Pedro Beltrán Espantoso and conservative senator Hector Boza.
