= National Socialist Workers Party =

National Socialist Workers Party primarily refers to the National Socialist German Workers' Party/Nazi Party (1920-1945)

National Socialist Workers Party may also refer to:

- National Socialist Workers' Party (Sweden) (1933-1950)
- National Socialist Workers' Party of Denmark (1930-1945)
- German National Socialist Workers' Party (Czechoslovakia) (1919-1933)
- Bulgarian National Socialist Workers Party (1932-1934)
- National Socialist Dutch Workers Party (1931-1941)
- Swedish National Socialist Farmers' and Workers' Party (1924-1930)
- Iran National-Socialist Workers Party
- Hungarian National Socialist Party (1920s-1944)
- Austrian National Socialist Party (1918-1933)
- Sudeten German Party (1933-1938)
- National Socialist Workers' Party (Poland) (1933-1934)

== See also ==
- National Socialist Party (disambiguation)
- National Workers Party (disambiguation)
