= National Popular Party =

National Popular Party may refer to:

- National Popular Party (Chile), a former political party in Chile
- National Popular Party (Romania), a political party in Romania
- Parti national populaire, a political party in Quebec

.
