= Fatherland Union =

Fatherland Union is a translated name for:

- Pro Patria Union, a defunct political party in Estonia
- Homeland Union – Lithuanian Christian Democrats, a political party in Lithuania
- Patriotic Union, a political party in Liechtenstein

See also: Fatherland
