= National Liberal Party =

National Liberal Party may refer to:

== Active parties ==
- National Liberal Party (El Salvador)
- National Liberal Party (Lebanon)
- National Liberal Party (Moldova)
- National Liberal Party (Romania)
- National Liberal Party (UK, 1999)

== Defunct parties ==
- National Liberal Party (Australia)
- National Liberal Party (Bermuda)
- National Liberal Party (Bulgaria)
- National Liberal Party (Denmark)
- National Liberal Party (Estonia)
- National Liberal Party (Germany), 1867–1918
- National Liberal Party (Hawaii)
- National Liberal Party (Hungary)
- National Liberal Party (Kingdom of Bohemia), known as Young Czech Party, 1874–1918
- National Liberal Party (Romania, 1875), a dissolved party in Romania
- National Liberal Party–Brătianu, Romania, 1930–1938
- National Liberal Party–Tătărescu, Romania, 1944–1950
- National Liberal Party (UK, 1922), 1922–1923, led by David Lloyd George, merged with UK Liberal Party
- National Liberal Party (UK, 1931), 1931–1968, merged with UK Conservative Party
- National Liberal Party – the Third Way, see Third Way (UK organisation)

== See also ==
- National liberalism
- Liberal Party (disambiguation)
