= United Workers' Party =

The United Workers' Party may refer to:

- Polish United Workers' Party
- United Workers' Party (Dominica)
- United Workers Party (Guyana)
- United Workers Party (Israel), commonly known as Mapam
- United Workers Party (Saint Lucia)
- United Workers Party (United States)
