= Christian People's Party =

Christian People's Party is a name or former name of several European and Latin American Christian Democratic parties including:

- Christian People's Party (Belgium)
- Christian People's Party (Denmark), now the Christian Democrats
- Christian People's Party (Dominican Republic)
- Christian People's Party (Estonia)
- Christian People's Party (Faroe Islands)
- Christian People's Party (Germany, 1920)
- Christian People's Party (Germany, 1965)
- Christian Democratic Party (Norway)
- Christian People's Party (Peru)
- Christian People's Party (Poland)
- Ruthenian Peasants Party (Czechoslovakia)

== See also ==
- Christian Democratic People's Party of Switzerland
