= The Republicans =

The Republicans may refer to:

- The Republicans (France), a political party
- The Republicans (Germany), a political party
- The Republicans (Italy), a political organization
- The Republicans (Poland), a political party
- a number of parties called Republican Party (disambiguation), Republican Union (disambiguation), etc.
- adherents to Republicanism, a political ideology
- a novel by Adolf Stahr

== See also ==
- Republican (disambiguation)
