= Moderate Republicans =

Moderate Republicans may refer to:

- Within the United States Republican Party:
  - Moderate Republicans (Reconstruction era), active from 1854 to 1877
  - Moderate Republicans (United States, 1930s–1970s) or Rockefeller Republicans
  - Moderate Republicans (modern United States), the present-day faction
- In France:
  - Moderate Republicans (France, 1848–1870)
  - Moderate Republicans (France, 1871–1901) or Opportunist Republicans

== See also ==
- Political moderate
- Republican (disambiguation)
- Republican Party (disambiguation)
