= Douluo Continent =

2021 Chinese television series

- Also known as: Soul Land; Soul Continent
- Genre: Fantasy; Action; Adventure; Xianxia
- Based on: Douluo Dalu There are up to 500 dimensions. (斗罗大陆) by Tang Jia San Shao
- Written by: Tang Jia San Shao; Wang Juan
- Directed by: Yang Zhen Yu
- Starring: Xiao Zhan; Wu Xuanyi
- Opening theme: "Standing Proudly at the Edge of the Clouds" (傲立云端) by Gao Tai Yu, Ao Zi Yi and Liu Run Nan
- Ending theme: "Starry River" (星河) by Wu Xuanyi
- Country of origin: China
- Original language: Mandarin
- No. of seasons: 1
- No. of episodes: 40 (Original version); 33 (CCTV version)

Production
- Producers: Fang Fang (芳芳） Yu Wan Qin（余婉琴） Li Xiao Biao（李小宝） Zhang Meng（张萌） Xu Jian (徐建); Ren Qiang (任强); Jing Qi Shen (景麒駪)
- Production locations: Hengdian World Studios; Xiangshan Film and Television Town
- Camera setup: Multi-camera
- Running time: 45 minutes
- Production companies: Tencent Penguin Pictures; New Classics Media

Original release
- Network: Tencent Video; CCTV
- Release: February 5, 2021 – April 2021

Related
- The Land of Warriors

Douluo Continent (simplified Chinese: 斗罗大陆; traditional Chinese: 鬥羅大陸; pinyin: Dòuluō Dàlù) is a 2021 Chinese television series based on a fantasy web novel of the same name by Tang Jia San Shao, starring Xiao Zhan and Wu Xuanyi. It premiered on Tencent Video, CCTV, and WeTV on February 5. It was successful despite its data suppression.

== Plot ==
Based on the novel of the same name, "Douluo Continent" tells the story of Tang San, who lost his mother at a young age, overcame many difficulties with his perseverance and strength.

Tang San (Xiao Zhan) lives with his alcoholic blacksmith father Tang Hao. Tang San yearns to know about his mother, but Tang Hao never talks about his wife. When Tang San attends a Spirit Awakening ceremony with Spirit Master Su Yun Tao, he discovers that his Spirit is Blue Silver Grass, which he is told is the most common of useless spirits. Tang San's Spirit Strength, however, is exceptional—and he discovers he has a second Spirit, which he keeps hidden and only reveals to his father. Tang Hao tells his son that only by becoming the strongest and most courageous man of Douluo Continent, he would be qualified to hear of his mother. Tang San goes to study at Nuo Ding Spirit Master Academy, where he befriends fellow student Xiao Wu (Wu Xuanyi) and Spirit theorist Yu Xiao Gang (Chen Calvin), who suspects Tang San has a second spirit, and teaches him about Blue Silver Grass being not useless as most other Spirit Masters claim, and how to gain power as a Spirit Master. Running into trouble with highborn student and bully Xiao Chen Yu (Wang Kai), and to avoid entanglement with the Spirit Hall organisation that virtually controls Spirit Masters on Douluo Continent, Tang San and Xiao Wu leave Nuo Ding academy, where they meet several other powerful and enigmatic Spirit Masters on their way through the ranks of their profession.

== Background ==
Tang Jia San Shao used traditional Chinese culture and historical stories as the blueprint and motif to create the original Chinese IP "Douluo Continent" through online literature. Tang Jia San Shao invested a lot of emotion in the creation. The male protagonist in "Douluo Continent" is based on the author himself, and many other characters are also from relatives and friends around him, taken from real life experiences.

== Cast ==
=== Main ===
- Xiao Zhan as Tang San
  - Han Hao Lin as Tang San (young)

A former young prodigy of the renowned Tang Sect. Wielder of dual martial souls, Sky Hammer and Lan Yin Grass.

- Wu Xuanyi as Xiao Wu (voiced by Qiao Shi Yu)

An orphan girl whose martial soul is a rabbit.

=== Supporting ===
Shrek's Seven Monsters (史莱克七怪）

- Gao Tai Yu as Dai Mu Bai (voiced by Wei Chao)
- Liu Mei Tong as Zhu Zhu Qing (voiced by Li Shi Meng)
- Liu Run Nan as Ou Si Ke
- Ding Xiao Ying as Ning Rong Rong (voiced by Liu Qing)
- Ao Zi Yi as Ma Hong Jun (voiced by Su Shang Qing)

Shrek Academy (史莱克学院）

- Calvin Chen as Yu Xiaogang / Grandmaster (voiced by Wang Kai)
- Qiu Xin Zhi as Frander, founder and director of Shrek Academy (Shi Lai Ke)
- Zhang Wen as Liu Erlong (voiced by Ma Hai Yan)

==== Others ====
- Zhong Zhen Tao as Tang Hao (voiced by Xuan Xiao Ming), Tang San's father.
- Zhu Zhu as Bi Bidong
- Huang Can Can as Hu Liena / Qian Ren Xue (voiced by Lu Xi Ran)
- Bao Xiao Song as Prince Xue Xing
- Shen Xiao Hai as Ning Feng Zhi
- Wen Sheng Hao as Ju Dou Luo
- Wang Yi Fan as Ye Zhiqiu
- Liu Jiao Xin as Dugu Bo
- Ren Qing Na Mu as Dugu Ya
- Li De Xin as Yu Tianheng
- Miao Hao Jun as Village Leader Ye Huo (voiced by Zhang Yao Han)
- Yu An as Tai Long
- Bao Bo Yu as Xue Qinghe
- Du Jun Ze as Dai Weishi
- Guo Jia Nuo as Shi Nian / Jian Dou Luo
- Li Hao as Wang Sheng
- Ma Dong Chen as Xiao Chenyu
- Ma Rui Ze as Liu Long
- Liu Wei as Village Leader of Sheng Hun Village
- Cui Peng as Su Yuntao (voiced by Chen Guang)
- Song Qing as Bu Le
- Wang Gen as Xue Beng
- Liu Ya Peng as Ma Hongjun's father

== Production ==
The series production for Douluo Continent was first announced in 2017. On November 1, 2018, preparations for filming were ready and by the end of 2018, preparations for filming had begun. Filming began in January 2019 until July of the same year.

Xiao Zhan and Wu Xuanyi were first announced as the main characters of this series on December 28, 2019, together with the release of the official poster of this series featuring the two main characters.

== Awards and nominations ==
Year	Award	Category	Nominee	Result	Ref.
2021	Siam Series Awards	Most Popular Chinese Online Drama Award	Doulou Continent	Won	
2021	Golden Goose Award	Annual Audience Favorite Drama	Doulou Continent	Won	
2021	DataWin Prosperity Award	Highest Prosperity Costume Drama Award	Doulou Continent	Won	
2021	DataWin Prosperity Award	Outstanding Prosperity Award	Doulou Continent	Won	
2021	Sanook Awards	Best Chinese Series of the Year	Doulou Continent	Won	
2021	Weibo TV Series Awards	Best Scenes	Doulou Continent	Won	
2021	Weibo TV Series Awards	Most Popular Television Series	Doulou Continent	Won	
2021	Weibo TV Series Awards	Most Popular Actresses	Wu Xuanyi	3rd	
2021	Weibo TV Series Awards	Most Popular Actor	Xiao Zhan	Won	
2021	WeTV Awards	Favorite Actor	Xiao Zhan	Won	
2021	WeTV Awards	Favorite Drama	Doulou Continent	Won	
2021	WeTV Awards	Best of Chinese Series	Doulou Continent	Won	
2021	WeTV Awards	Artist of the Year	Xiao Zhan	Nominated	
2021	WeTV Awards	Best Actor	Xiao Zhan	Won	
2021	Beijing Daily's Film and Television Awards	Best Actor	Xiao Zhan	Won	
2021	Beijing Daily's Film and Television Awards	Best Actresses	Wu Xuanyi	Nominated	
2021	Beijing Daily's Film and Television Awards	Best Drama	Doulou Continent	Nominated	
2021	Weibo Night	Most Popular Drama of the Year	Doulou Continent	Won	
2022	Weibo Night	Weibo King	Xiao Zhan	Nominated	
2022	Weibo Night	Weibo Queen	Wu Xuanyi	Nominated	
2022	Weibo TV and Internet Video Summit Awards	Audience Favourite Works	Doulou Continent	Nominated	
2022	Weibo TV and Internet Video Summit Awards	Most Favourite Male Characters (Tang San)	Xiao Zhan	Nominated	
2022	Weibo TV and Internet Video Summit Awards	Most Favourite Female Characters (Xiao Wu)	Wu Xuanyi	Nominated	
2022	31st Golden Eagle Awards	Best TV Series	Doulou Continent	Nominated	
2022	Weibo Music Awards	Best Soundtrack	The Youth on a Horse" (策马正少年) (by Xiao Zhan)	Nominated	

== International broadcast ==
Network	Country or region	Ref.
AsiaUHD	Korea	
Astro TV	Malaysia	
GMA Network	Philippines	
MediaCorp Channel 8	Singapore	
SKY PerfecTV!	Japan	
Viki	International	
WeTV	International	
YouTube	International	
