= Republican Liberal Party =

Republican Liberal Party may refer to:

- Republican Liberal Party (Panama)
- Republican Liberal Party (Portugal) (1919–1923)

== See also ==
- Liberal Republican Party (disambiguation)
- Republican Party (disambiguation)
