= Sunshine by My Side =

Chinese television series

- Promotional poster
- Traditional Chinese: 骄阳伴我
- Hanyu Pinyin: Jiao Yang Ban Wo
- Genre: Romance; Comedy; Life
- Based on: My Dear Boy (Taiwanese original story)
- Written by: Li Xiao
- Directed by: Song Xiaofei
- Starring: Xiao Zhan; Bai Baihe
- Country of origin: China
- Original language: Mandarin
- No. of seasons: 1
- No. of episodes: 36

Production
- Producer: Gong Yu
- Editors: Lu Tian; Zheng Dan; Wu Peina
- Running time: 45 minutes

Original release
- Network: Tencent; iQiyi; CCTV
- Release: September 1 – September 17, 2023

Sunshine By My Side is a 2023 Chinese urban romance TV series produced by CCTV, iQiyi, Tencent Video and New Classics Media. It is directed by Song Xiaofei, written by Li Xiao and Jiang Wuji, and starred by Xiao Zhan, Bai Baihe, Tian Yu, and Zhu Zhu, with Yuan Wenkang, Liu Xun, Xiang Hanzhi, Wu Xingjian, and Han Qiuchi as the main actors, Yang Haoyu, Wang Lin, and Dai Lele as special actors, and Wu Dairong and Bu Guanjin as guest actors. It tells the love story of Jian Bing and Sheng Yang who support each other along the way. The drama is adapted from the TV series "My Boy". It started filming on September 27, 2022, and completed filming on February 7, 2023. It is scheduled to premiere on CCTV-8's prime time on September 1, 2023, and will premiere on iQiyi and Tencent Video.

== Synopsis ==
The drama tells the story of an advertising director Jian Bing (played by Bai Baihe) and a newcomer designer Sheng Yang (played by Xiao Zhan) who meet by chance. The two, who have contrasting personalities, gradually develop romantic feelings for each other in their daily interactions.

== Cast ==
Actor	Role
Xiao Zhan	Sheng Yang
Bai Baihe	Jian Bing
Tian Yu	Xue Yiming
Zhu Zhu	Liang Shanshan
Yuan Wenkang	Fang Mu
Liu Xun	Song Chen
Xiang Hanzhi	Pan Rou
Wu Xingjian	Hao Junjie
Han Qiuchi	Wang Youde
Yang Haoyu	Sheng Xiangqian
Wang Lin	Luo Meijuan
Dai Lele	Liu Jiale
Wu Dairong	Jian Zhongde
Bu Guanjin	Jane Frost

== Reception ==
A high-profile urban emotional drama "The Sun With Me" has achieved remarkable results upon the beginning of broadcast. The drama set a record for CCTV's highest ratings in the past five years, ranking among the CCTV ratings.

Currently, the series has also been streamed overseas, earning a high score at 8.8 points out of 10 on the US review aggregator, IMDb. Due to Xiao Zhan's unstoppable momentum, "The Sun Is With Me" was also co-broadcast on CCTV, iQiyi, and Tencent Video, which is unprecedented and shows that it is very popular. In addition, the number of episodes broadcast online is 4 episodes earlier than the TV broadcast, and the ratings of "Sunshine With Me" so far on CCTV have exceeded 1.
