= Radical Republicans (disambiguation) =

Radical Republicans were a United States political movement.

Radical Republican may also refer to:

- Radical Party (France), formerly the Republican, Radical and Radical-Socialist Party
- Radicalism (historical), European left-wing movement
- Radical Republican Party, Spanish political party

== See also ==
- Republican Party (disambiguation)
- Political radicalism
- Republicanism
