= Republican Era =

Republican Era can refer to:

- Minguo calendar, the official era of the Republic of China

It may also refer to any era in a country's history when it was governed as a republic or by a Republican Party. In particular, it may refer to:

- Roman Republic (509 BCE–27 BCE)
- Commonwealth of England (1649–1653)
- Republican Chile (1818–1891)
- History of Ecuador (1830–1860), the beginning of that country's republican era
- Republic of Cuba (1902–1959)
- Republic of China (1912–1949)
- Second Spanish Republic (1931–1939)
- Turkey (1922–present)
