= SpyING =

Chinese television series

- Simplified Chinese: 谍报上不封顶
- Hanyu Pinyin: Die Bao Shang Bu Feng Ding
- Genre: Spy; Republican
- Written by: Xu Ruo Xin, Gong Qi
- Directed by: Zhang Kai Zhou
- Starring: Xiao Zhan; Zhou Yu Tong
- Country of origin: China
- Original language: Mandarin
- No. of seasons: 1
- No. of episodes: 40

Production
- Production location: China
- Running time: 45 minutes

Original release
- Network: Youku

SpyING is an upcoming Chinese television drama series produced for Youku by Daylight Entertainment / Noon Sunshine style productions. It was directed by Zhang Kai Zhou and produced by Hou Hong Liang.

== Plot ==
Set in Nanjing around 1948, the story revolves around Ren Shaobai (Xiao Zhan), an underground Communist Party member who has long been hiding. After his contact is sacrificed, he resurfaces inside the Ministry of National Defense, goes deep into the intelligence network, and becomes an aide in the intelligence department. Meanwhile, Lan Youyin, the widow of a lost comrade and a mathematical genius, secretly plans assassination missions for unknown motives. Their paths cross, evolve from hostility to cooperation, and Ren Shaobai must navigate loyalty, moral ambiguity, secrets and danger.

== Cast and characters ==
=== Main ===
- Xiao Zhan as Ren Shao Bai
  - Xiao Tian Ren as Ren Shao Bai [Young]
- Zhou Yu Tong as Lan You Yin

=== Supporting ===
- Feng Hui as Li He Lin
- Lin Bo Yang as Shen Tong
- Gu Zhi Xin as Peng Yong Cheng
- Zheng Jia Bin as Lu Peng
- Shen Jia Yu as Zhu Yan Jun
- Liu Yi Hong as Wen Rang
- Xing Min Shan as Cao Jiang Xian

and many others

== Production ==
The series was mainly filmed in the Jiangsu-Zhejiang-Shanghai region. Filming started on 25 May 2025 and wrapped up on September 30, 2025.

It is expected to premiere on the streaming platform 优酷 (Youku) in 2026.
