= Xia Zhiguang =

Chinese actor and singer (born 2000)

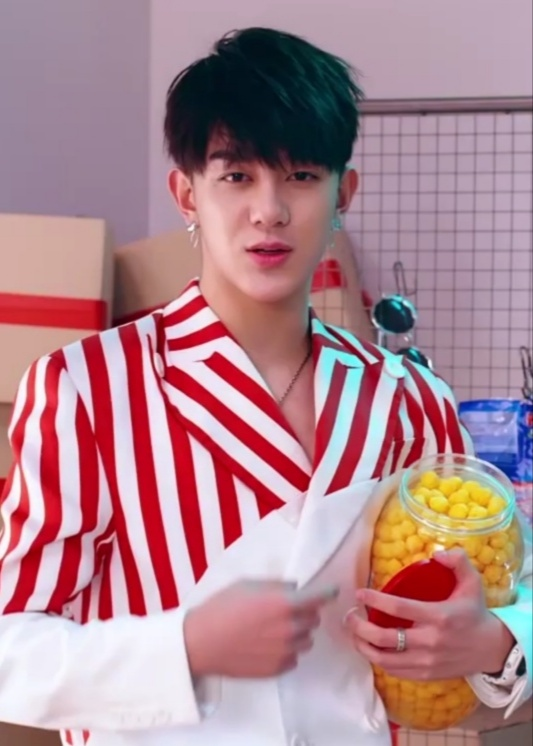
- Xia in 2019
- Born: 4 January 2000 (age 26); Hefei, Anhui, China
- Education: Shanghai Theatre Academy
- Occupations: Actor; singer
- Years active: 2015–present
- Agent: Huanyu Film
- Height: 183 cm (6 ft 0 in)
- Musical career
- Genres: Mandopop
- Instrument: Vocals
- Formerly of: X Nine; R1SE

Chinese name
- Simplified Chinese: 夏之光
- Hanyu Pinyin: Xià Zhīguāng

Xia Zhiguang (Chinese: 夏之光, born January 4, 2000) is a Chinese actor and singer. He began his career in the entertainment industry when he participated in the idol survival show X-Fire (2015) and joined the Chinese boy group X Nine. Later, he participated in the second season of Produce 101 China and finished fourth place, becoming a member of R1SE. Following R1SE and X Nine's disbandment, Xia focused on acting. As an actor, he is well-known for his roles in The Spirealm (2024), Dashing Youth (2024), and Blossom (2024).

== Filmography ==
=== Films ===
Year	Title	Role	Ref.
2018	Monster Hunt 2	Village dancer	
2026	All The Good Eyes	Wang Fang	
TBA	Sen Zhong You Lin		

=== Television series ===
Year	Title	Role	Notes	Ref.
2018	Oh! My Emperor	Yao Guang		
2019	Nine Kilometers of Love	Zhou Yuhang		
2021	Please Classmate	Li He		
2021	Everybody in the House	Xia Tiegang		
2023	Got a Crush on You	Qian Cheng		
2024	The Spirealm	Ruan Lanzhu		
2024	Dashing Youth	Sikong Changfeng		
2024	Strange Tales of Jiang Cheng	Qin Huole		
2024	Blossom	Yuan Tong / Ji Yong / Ji Jianming		
2025	Home About Us	Cheng Xu		
2025	Blood River	Sikong Changfeng	Guest appearance	
2025	Whispers of Fate	Fu Zhumei	Guest appearance	
2026	Veil of Shadows	Liu Weixue		
TBA	Shadows of Desire	Li Mingshu		

=== Television shows ===
Year	Title	Role	Notes	Ref.
2015	X Fire	Contestant		
2018	Super Nova Games	Contestant		
2019	Produce Camp 2019	Contestant	Finished 4th	
2019	Super Nova Games Season 2	Contestant		
2020	Produce Camp 2020	Senior		
2020	Super Nova Games Season 3	Contestant		
2021	Produce Camp 2021	Senior		
2021	Welcome Buddies	Cast member		
2024	Random Journey on the Way	Cast member		
2024	Guo Yi Shao Nian Zhi	Cast member		
2025	Love Actually Season 4	Panelist	(Episode 10–26)	
2025	Guo Yi Shao Nian Zhi Season 2	Cast member		
