= The Oath of Love =

Chinese television series

- Promotional poster
- Traditional Chinese: 餘生，請多指教
- Simplified Chinese: 余生，请多指教
- Hanyu Pinyin: Yúshēng, qǐng duō zhǐjiào
- Genre: Romance; Medical drama
- Based on: Entrust the Rest of My Life to You (余生, 请多指教) by Bo Lin Shi Jiang
- Written by: Bo Lin Shi Jiang
- Directed by: Lü Ying
- Starring: Yang Zi; Xiao Zhan
- Country of origin: China
- Original language: Mandarin
- No. of seasons: 1
- No. of episodes: 30

Production
- Producer: Wu Tianxu
- Editors: Lu Tian; Zheng Dan; Wu Peina
- Running time: 45 minutes
- Production company: Shanghai Tencent Penguin Film Culture Communication Co. Ltd

Original release
- Network: Tencent; Hunan TV
- Release: March 15 – March 31, 2022

The Oath of Love (Chinese: 余生，请多指教; pinyin: yú shēng, qǐng duō zhǐ jiāo) is a 2022 Chinese romance medical drama television series directed by Lü Ying, starring Yang Zi and Xiao Zhan. It premiered from March 15 to March 31, 2022 on WeTV internationally, Hunan TV Primetime and Tencent Web Platform.

== Plot ==
Lin Zhi Xiao (Yang Zi) is a gifted young cellist about to graduate from university. She works hard to overcome her flightiness from her youth, and is hoping to make a career in playing cello. However, when her father is diagnosed with cancer, she stops everything and spends time at the hospital caring for him. Gu Wei is his surgical doctor. He is very solemn and almost cold, although glimpses of his warm heart can be seen from time to time. As Zhi Xiao's father progresses through treatment, she and Dr. Gu become close—she helps him learn how to enjoy life, and he helps her focus on what she truly wants in life.

== Cast and characters ==
=== Main cast ===
- Yang Zi as Lin Zhixiao

3rd year university student in the music department, majoring in cello. She is energetic, positive, kind, does not admit defeat easily, and is like a sun that brightens up your life. She is able to distinguish right from wrong, sometimes smart, but sometimes acts on impulse. She is persistent in achieving her goals and does not give up easily. Although she is a bit ignorant and slow when it comes to relationships, once she is sure about her feelings and intentions, she will press forward courageously.

- Xiao Zhan as Gu Wei

Chief surgeon at a gastroenterology center. He is very capable, but he takes to heart his failures and setbacks a bit too excessively. A patient's death on the table almost became the last straw for him, and he was facing huge psychological stress. When Gu Wei met Lin Zhixiao, they became the sun that warmed each other, and hand in hand, they walked out of the haze of problems and enjoyed the rest of their lives together.

=== Supporting cast ===
- Zhai Zilu as Gu Xiao

Gu Wei's cousin. He is a typical son in a rich family. He is flirtatious and cynical. His hobbies are spending money and dating. He does not get into serious relationships, however, after meeting San San, he feels that he has found true love. He is very nosy towards Gu Wei's relationship status and tries to help him in his relationship, but always ends up causing trouble instead.

- Ma Yujie as Gao Xi

A Gastrointestinal chief surgeon. She is the assistant director's daughter and is Gu Wei's classmate and colleague. She is excellent, calm, smart and capable. However, she is arrogant on the inside and she strictly keeps a distance from her patients. At work, she is very good partners with Gu Wei, and everyone thinks that she is the most suitable person for Gu Wei to marry. She loves and respects Gu Wei a lot and always tries to help him at work. However, her values clashes with Gu Wei's values, and she isn't able to enter into Gu Wei's inner world.

- Li Muchen as Xiao Shan / San San

Lin Zhixiao's best friend. They advise each other about life and relationships. She often stands up for Lin Zhixiao. She is beautiful, generous, smart, and someone who dares to love and hate. She has high emotional intelligence and is someone who has a deep understanding of the way of life. She seems to be a master at love, has a playful attitude towards love and is never sloppy, but in fact, she desires for a good love and will become reckless when encountering true love.

- Li Yunrui as Shao Jiang

Lin Zhixiao's love interest and spiritual support when she was a teenager. He is bright, full of talent, and a perfect senior in everyone's eyes. However, because he went overseas after graduating from high school, the relationship between him and Lin Zhixiao came to an end and he felt regretful. After he returned from overseas, he competed against Gu Wei for Lin Zhixiao.

- Zhao Shiyi as Yin Xi
- Zhang Yuqi as Jin Shi
- Wang Chengyang as Du Wenjun
- Du Shuangyu as Yan Bingjun
- Chen Xiaowei as Yang Xiaoran
- Hao Wenting as Li Huijuan

Lin Zhixiao's mother. Formerly a language teacher in a high school, she later quit the job for her family. She is fashionable, enlightening, and she interacts with Lin Zhixiao like sisters instead of mother and daughter. She has a very good relationship with Lin Zhixiao's father, and is the "big princess" he has been protecting using his life.

- Xia Zhiqing as Lin Jianguo

Lin Zhixiao's father. He is a dean in a high school. He seems strict and old-fashioned. After getting off from work, he will change the atmosphere of the house into that of the school. He often gets into conflicts with Lin Zhixiao, but in fact, he loves his daughter very much and silently tries to understand her thoughts and likings. He has a sharp tongue but a soft heart, and is like a typical Chinese father who doesn't know how to express his feelings. With a history of gastric ulcer for 20 years, he was later diagnosed with gastric cancer and became Gu Wei's patient.

== Production ==
Filming began in August 2019 and officially ended on November 6, 2019. Filming took place in Wuxi, Jiangsu Province, China.

== Broadcast ==
On August 5, 2021, it was announced that the drama would air on September 8, 2021. However, on September 5, 2021, just 3 days before the previously confirmed airing date, it was announced that the airing of the drama would be postponed, and that the specific airing date would be announced at further notice. On March 14, 2022, The new release date was officially announced, premiers March 15, on the Chinese streaming platform Tencent Video and WeTV. It can also be seen on the Rakuten Viki streaming service.

== Soundtracks ==
No.	Title	Lyrics	Music	Singers	Length
1.	"The Oath of Love (余生，请多指教)" (Theme song)	Zhang Ying	Luo Kun	Xiao Zhan, Yang Zi	3:02
2.	"The Greatest Fortune (最幸福的幸运）"	Zhang Ying	Luo Kun	Xiao Zhan
3.	"Somebody Liking Someone （一个人喜欢一个人）"	Zhang Ying	Luo Kun	Yang Zi

== Awards and nominations ==
Year	Award	Category	Nominee	Result	Ref.
2022	Tencent Group	Business Breakthrough Award	The Oath of Love	Won	
2022	Weibo TV and Internet Video Summit Awards	Audience Favourite Works	The Oath of Love	Won	
2022	Weibo TV and Internet Video Summit Awards	Top 10 Television and Music Soundtrack	"The Oath of Love" (余生，请多指教) (By Xiao Zhan and Yang Zi)	Nominated	
2022	Weibo TV and Internet Video Summit Awards	Most Favourite Male Characters (Gu Wei)	Xiao Zhan	Nominated	
2022	Weibo TV and Internet Video Summit Awards	Most Favourite Female Characters (Lin Zhixiao)	Yang Zi	Nominated	
2022	31st Golden Eagle Awards	Best TV Series	The Oath of Love	Nominated	
2022	Tencent Video Golden Goose Awards	Audience Favourite Series of the Year	The Oath of Love	Won	
2022	Tencent Video Golden Goose Awards	Outstanding Producer of the Year	Wu Tianxu	Won	
2022	Beijing Daily's Film and Television Awards	Role Model	Xiao Zhan	Nominated	
2022	Weibo TV Series Awards	Most Popular Television Series	The Oath of Love	Won	
2022	Weibo TV Series Awards	Romantic Characters of The Year	Gu Wei (Xiao Zhan)	Won	
2022	Weibo TV Series Awards	Romantic Characters of The Year	Lin Zhixiao (Yang Zi)	Won	
2022	WeTV Awards	Best of Chinese Series	The Oath of Love	Won	
2022	WeTV Awards	Best Drama	The Oath of Love	Won	
2022	Entertainment Impact Award	TV Drama of the Year	The Oath of Love	Won	
2022	Entertainment Impact Award	All-End Hot TV Series of the Year	The Oath of Love	Won	
2022	Entertainment Impact Award	Screen Influential Role of the Year	Xiao Zhan	Won	
2023	POP GOLDEN AWARDS	Golden Chinese Drama Award	The Oath of Love	Won	
2023	POP GOLDEN AWARDS	The Golden TV/Drama Actor Award (International)	Xiao Zhan	Nominated	
2023	Weibo Night	Drama of the Year	The Oath of Love	Won	
