= Republican Alternative Party =

Republican Alternative Party may refer to:

- Republican Alternative Party (Azerbaijan)
- Republican Alternative Party (Spain)

== See also ==
- Republican Party (disambiguation)
