= Xiao Zhan =

Chinese actor and singer (born 1991)

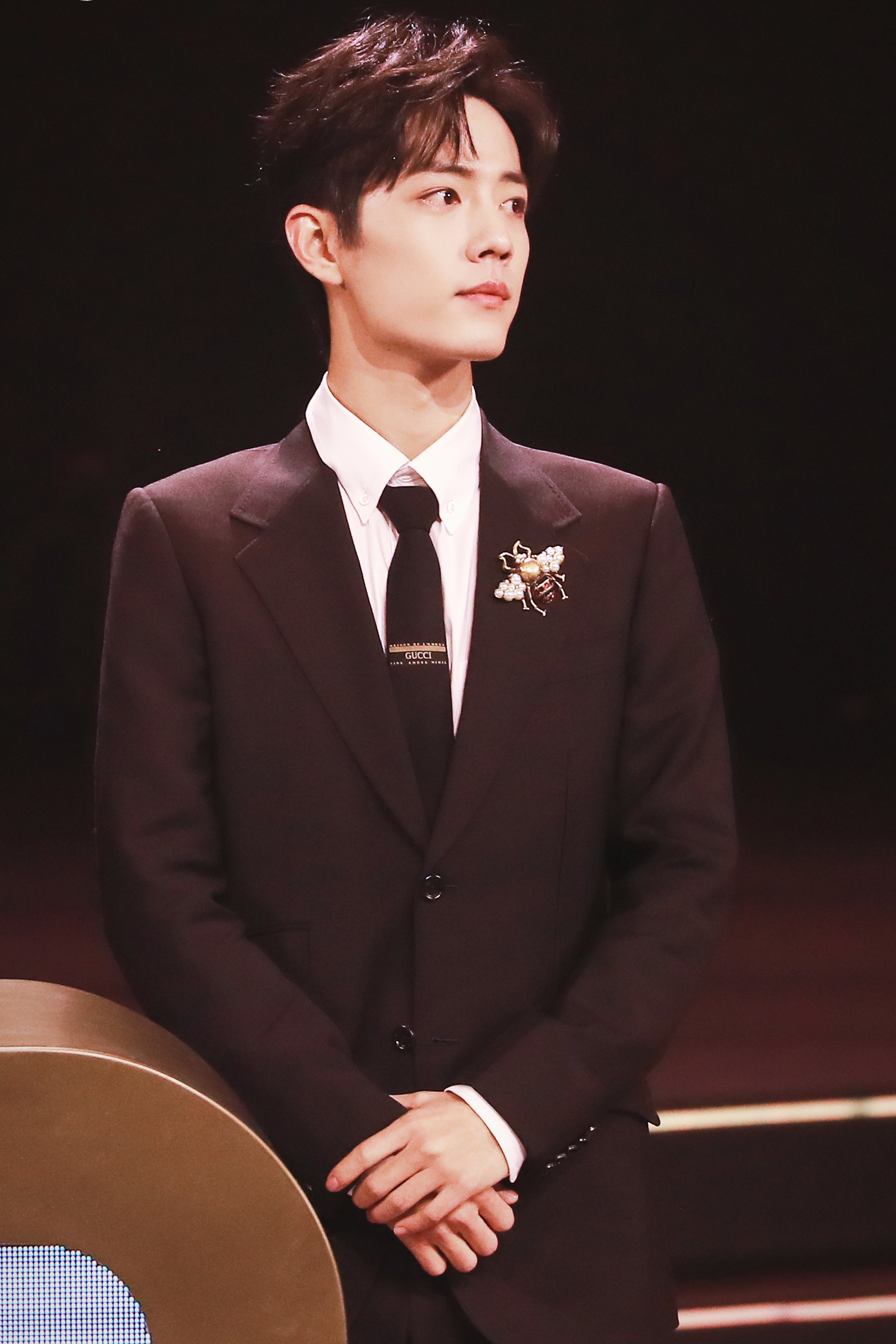
- Xiao in January 2020
- Born: 5 October 1991 (age 35); Chongqing, China
- Other name: Sean Xiao
- Education: Modern International Art Design Academy, Chongqing Technology and Business University
- Occupations: Actor; singer
- Years active: 2015–present
- Height: 183 cm (6 ft 0 in)
- Musical career
- Genre: Mandopop
- Instrument: Vocals
- Label: Xiao Zhan Studio
- Formerly of: X Nine

Chinese name
- Traditional Chinese: 肖戰
- Simplified Chinese: 肖战
Transcriptions
Standard Mandarin
- Hanyu Pinyin: Xiāo Zhàn
- IPA: [ɕjáʊ ʈʂân]

Xiao Zhan (Chinese: 肖战, born 5 October 1991) is a Chinese actor and singer. He began his career in the entertainment industry when he participated in the idol survival show X-Fire (2015) and joined the Chinese boy group X Nine. He achieved breakthrough success with the xianxia drama The Untamed (2019), followed by dramas Joy of Life (2019), The Wolf (2020), Douluo Continent (2021), Ace Troops (2021), The Oath of Love (2022), The Youth Memories (2023), The Longest Promise (2023), Sunshine by My Side (2023), The Legend of Zang Hai (2025), Small Town Remedy (2026) as well as films Jade Dynasty (2019), Legends of the Condor Heroes: The Gallants (2025) and Gezhi Town (2025).

As a singer, Xiao Zhan released "Spotlight" in 2020, which set the Guinness World Record for the highest-selling digital single of all time, the fastest-selling digital track, and the biggest-selling digital single in China. In 2024, he released his first studio album WM, which became the best-selling album of all time on TME Physical Album Sales Chart and earned him "Album of the Year" at the QQ Music Awards.

== Early life and education ==
Xiao Zhan was born on 5 October 1991, in Chongqing. From childhood, he began to learn painting and play the violin. He studied at Modern International Art Design Academy at Chongqing Technology and Business University wherein he was a member of the class literary committee and an active participant in the university choir, the head of the vocal music department of the student art troupe, the head of the male vocal department, and participated in the school's language art troupe as an actor. He was once awarded the title of the top ten singers on campus.

In 2012, he set up a photography studio with his friends and served as their main photographer. After his graduation in 2014 and prior to his debut, Xiao worked as a photographer and graphic designer.

== Acting career ==
=== 2015–2018: Career beginnings ===
Xiao Zhan’s acting career began on the set of the youth fantasy series, Super Star Academy. He joined the filming on April 15, 2016 and portrayed the leading character, Fang Tian Ze. The series premiered on September 29 and garnered 1.68 billion views on Tencent Video.

In 2017, between April 9 and September 18, Xiao Zhan was filming for The Wolf, as Ji Chong, one of the main characters, who has double identity, the bounty hunter and the prince. This was his first participation in a major drama production (49 episodes) with well known production team and cast members, he gained a lot of acting experience on the set of this drama.

In 2018, he starred as Beitang Moran in the well-received historical romance web drama Oh! My Emperor, which garnered over 3.58 billion views. His portrayal of a domineering yet gentle prince earned him recognition. Additionally, he played Liu Xiuya in the fantasy action drama Battle Through the Heavens that same year.

He made cameo appearances in series and films between 2016 and 2018, including Shuttle Love Millennium 2, Monster Hunt 2, and The Rookies.

=== 2019–2020: Breakthrough and rise to prominence ===
In 2019, Xiao starred in the xianxia drama The Untamed, adapted from the web novel Grandmaster of Demonic Cultivation by Mo Xiang Tong Xiu (墨香铜臭). His portrayal of the carefree and unrestrained Wei Wuxian, who evolves into the darker and tormented Yiling Laozu (Yiling Patriarch), received very positive reviews, aiding the series' rise in popularity; it had gained over 10 billion views by December 2021. The series also gained a huge following overseas after it became available on Netflix on 25 October 2019. In the same year, he portrayed the protagonist Zhang Xiaofan in the film Jade Dynasty, adapted from the xianxia novel Zhu Xian by Xiao Ding (萧鼎). The film topped the China box office on its opening day that earned over 400 million yuan within 18 days of release and became the highest-grossing Chinese language movie in Thailand in a decade. In September 2019, it was announced that Xiao had established his own studio, "XZ STUDIO," in collaboration with Wajijiwa Entertainment.

On January 24, 2020, Xiao appeared as a participant in CCTV New Year's Gala for the first time, acting out a skit Like You Like Me alongside Xie Na. On 26 November 2020, the historical drama Joy of Life streamed on Tencent and iQIYI, where he played the supporting role Yan Bingyun, and featured him in the soundtrack "余年" (Remaining Years). Xiao starred in The Wolf as Ji Chong and was released on Tencent Video, iQiyi, and Youku on 19 November 2020. The series topped the popularity indexes in mainland China since its release and surpassed 500 million views on a single platform within 11 days. As of December 2020, the total number of viewership on the three platforms has exceeded 1 billion, with an average daily view of nearly 100 million. In late 2020, Xiao was filming Ace Troops, which wrapped production on 14 December 2020.

=== 2021–2024: Mainstream success and theater debut ===
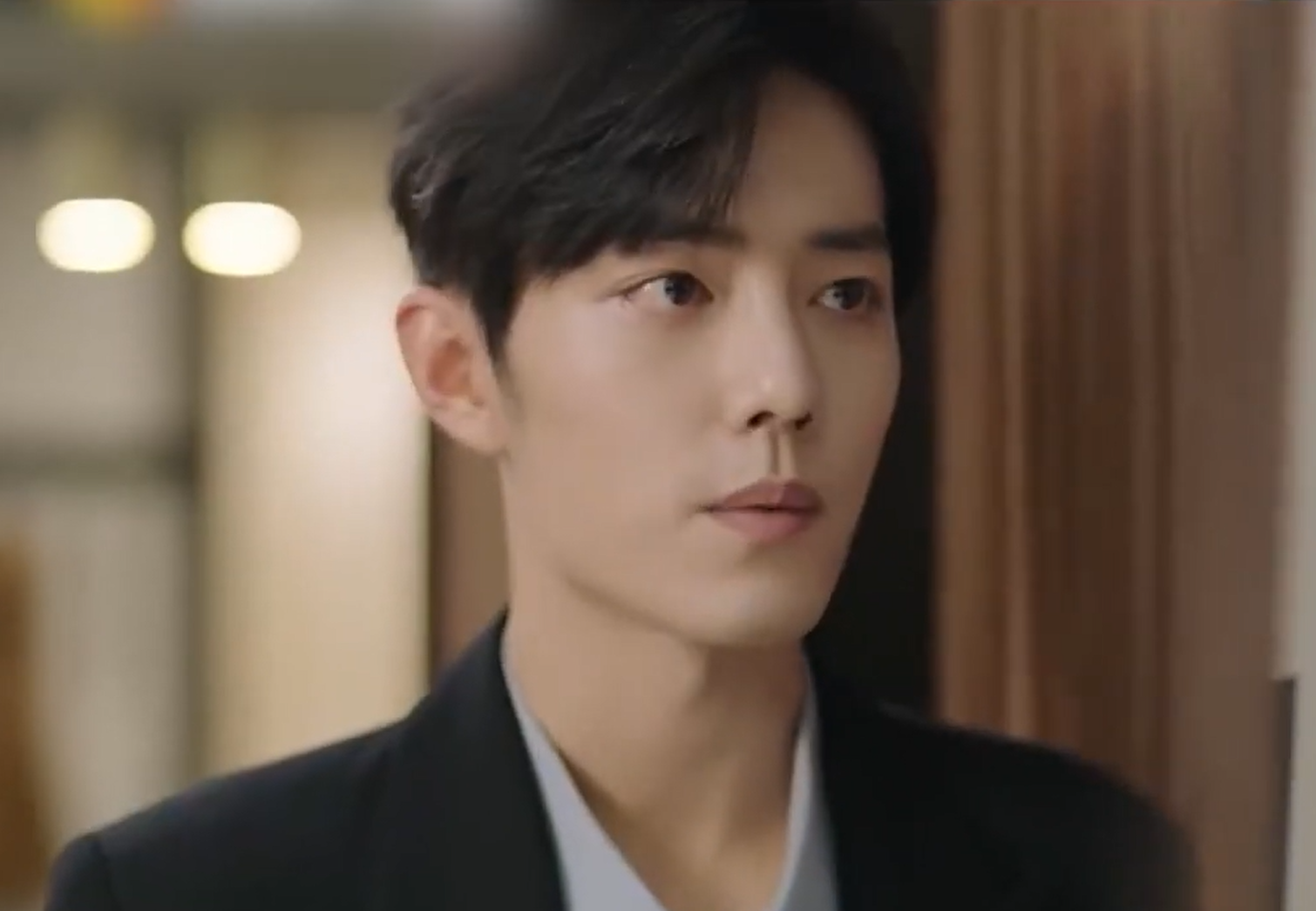
Xiao Zhan in 2022

In February 2021, the drama Douluo Continent, adapted from the acclaimed book series of the same name by Tang Jia San Shao, premiered on CCTV-8, CCTV Video App and Tencent Video. Xiao played as the protagonist Tang San, a rare wielder of dual martial souls. Douluo Continent was one of the most successful dramas in China, with a total of 5.70 billion views, the highest single-day broadcast volume of 211 million views, and an average of 138 million views per episode. China Literature also recognized it as one of the most successful dramas adapted from IP of the year.

On 29 March 2021, Xiao was announced as the main lead Shi Ying in the historical drama The Longest Promise, inspired by the fantasy novel "Mirror: Zhu Yan" (朱颜) by author Cang Yue (沧月). The first trailer was released on 7 June 2021, and the series filming wrapped on 4 August 2021.

On 22 April 2021, he made his theater debut, starring in Yang Hua's version of the critically acclaimed eight-hour drama A Dream Like a Dream (如夢之夢), wherein the first day served as a paid tribute to the volunteers, community workers and medical staff in Wuhan. He played the central character of nameless Patient No. 5, and had since continued to act the role for over three years, touring with the cast in cities such as Qingdao, Chengdu, Hangzhou, Shenzhen, and Beijing as well as participating for a total of 72 performances until May 2023. The production is listed in the China Performance Industry Association's Performance Market Annual Report for 2021, ranking as No. 1 in the Theater Category for the Highest Average Ticket Sales in a Single Screening and Annual Ticket Sales and Screenings. In a heartwarming gesture to bless Xiao on his first theater play, fans from all over the world flooded the Wuhan QinTai Theatre with flower stands, forming a picturesque "Flower Ocean." Later that evening, in a demonstration of gratitude and generosity, his studio requested the flowers be distributed among the people of Wuhan.

On 26 December 2021, the military drama Ace Troops broadcast exclusively on Jiangsu TV and iQIYI platforms. The drama was well received, and data from CVB, China Audiovisual Big Data, showed an increase in viewership of up to 125% during the drama's airing period for the Jiangsu Television Channel.

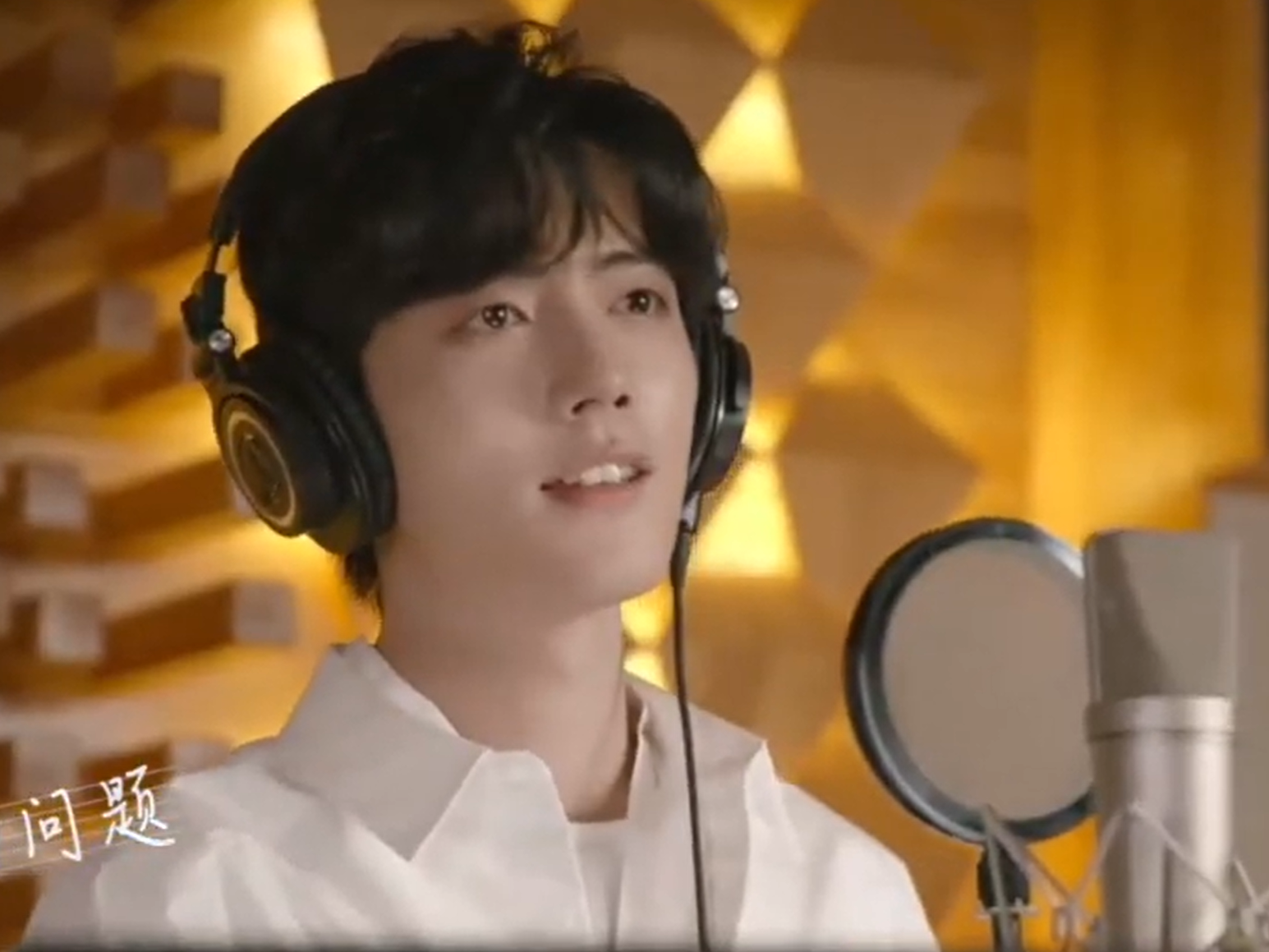
Xiao Zhan in 2022

On 15 March 2022, he played Gu Wei, a warm and gentle doctor, in the highly anticipated modern romance drama The Oath of Love, which began broadcasting on Hunan Television Primetime, as well as the Tencent Online Platform, and simultaneously on WeTV for international audience. The drama received positive reviews, was a commercial success, and hit 4 billion views on 20 April 2022, in just 37 days of broadcast, and won the "Tencent Business Breakthrough Award," one of the highest platform-level award. The Weibo Character Index for Xiao's portrayal of Gu Wei is breaking a new height at 120. The WeChat Index for Gu Wei hits 164 millions. On 28 September 2022, Xiao was announced as a lead for Sunshine by My Side.

In May 2023, Xiao was confirmed to play the pivotal role of Guo Jing, the lead character in Hong Kong director Tsui Hark's highly anticipated big-budget adaptation of the 1957 seminal wuxia novel The Legend of the Condor Heroes, written by Jin Yong. On 1 June 2023, The Youth Memories aired on state-run CCTV-8, Tencent Video, Dragon TV, and online platforms. The show has consistently exceeded 2% in real-time TV ratings, has been the top show among shows airing in the same time slot, and was the first show in 2023 to surpass 30,000 heat index on Tencent Video. For his portrayal of Xiao Chunsheng, he received acting awards, namely, Outstanding Actor at the 19th Chinese-American Film and TV Festival Golden Angel Awards and Breakthrough Actor of the Year at the 2nd Chinese TV Drama CMG Annual Ceremony.

On 2 July 2023, The Longest Promise premiered on WeTV. The drama exploded to the top spot on Weibo's hot search upon its release. After the premiere, it hit 21,000 popularity points on Tencent and increased to 26,000 points 3.5 hours later. On 7 July, the drama made its debut on Netflix, five days after being released on WeTV. It has become one of the top five most popular series in Thailand. Since its premiere, it has achieved the highest single-day viewership in multiple countries, including the United States, Canada, Australia, and New Zealand. After the completion of its exclusive VIP broadcast, the drama comments have surpassed 10 million, setting a record for a character's popularity that surpasses 50 million and acquiring over 100 million interactive bullet screen comments on Tencent Video.

On 1 September 2023, Sunshine by My Side was aired on CCTV-8, IQIYI and Tencent Video. The series set a record for CCTV's highest ratings in the past five years. The drama also topped the Maoyan platform and became the most popular drama at that time, surpassing well-established titles such as Lost You Forever and Glory of Our Fathers. On 30 December 2023, The Legend of Zang Hai, directed by Zheng Xiaolong and starring Xiao as the male lead, was officially launched and a concept poster was released.

=== 2025–present: Critical recognition and expansion in film and television ===
In 2025, Xiao starred in two top-grossing films. The first was Tsui Hark's historical martial arts film Legends of the Condor Heroes: The Gallants, in which he played Guo Jing. It was released on 29 January, Chinese New Year in China, and was internationally distributed by Sony Pictures International Productions, releasing it in Malaysia, Singapore, Thailand, Australia, New Zealand, United States, and Indonesia in February. The second was Gezhi Town, Kong Sheng's war drama film set during the Battle of West Hubei in the Second Sino-Japanese War, which was released in China on 6 December. For his portrayal of Mo Dexian, Xiao won Best Actor of the Golden Petrel Awards at the Asian Art Film Festival and Most Popular Actor of the Year of the Flying Tiger Awards at the Beijing College Student Film Festival.

The same year, he made a television comeback in the historical drama The Legend of Zang Hai as the titular character, which premiered on 18 May 2025 on CCTV-8 and Youku. The drama was an absolute blockbuster, breaking records for daily viewership, global streaming, and cross-platform market share in over 190 countries and regions. His performance named him Outstanding Quality Star of the year at the SMG TV Series Quality Awards and Popular Actor of the Year at the Beijing Daily's Film and Television Awards. This also earned him nominations for Best Actor category at the Macau International Television Festival, CMG China TV Drama Annual Ceremony, and the prestigious 31st Shanghai TV Festival Magnolia Awards. This latter was presented at the Magnolia Awards Banquet on June 25, 2026. The next day, Xiao led the singing of the theme song, "Singing with a Smile," during the main awarding ceremony. In 2026, at age 34, he became the first actor born in the 1990s and the youngest recipient to win Best Actor honors in back-to-back blockbuster hits, with The Legend of Zang Hai and Gezhi Town, which led to Chinese media dubbing him the "Double Emperor of Movie and Television."

In 2026 on 1 August, the web feature film Mo Dexian, starring Xiao, premiered exclusively on Ju Haocan TV on-demand platform. The three-part film is set during the War of Resistance Against Japanese Agression. According to the source, during the production of the film Gezhi Town (2025), the Daylight Entertainment creative team developed back stories and character details which could not be explored in the theatrical film, due to the runtime limitations. The web film Mo Dexian is a complete reworking of the original production, resulting in a fully independent film with its own artistic expression.

On 21 October Small Town Remedy premiered on CCTV-8 and IQIYI. In this realistic medical television drama, directed by Zhang Xiaobo, Xiao portrays neurosurgeon, Liu Zheng Liang who returned to his hometown in the Northeast China after his career in the South was implicated in unfortunate events. The drama was popular and received positive reviews during its broadcast. In November, it was shortlisted for the 17th Macau International Television Festival.

== Music career ==
=== 2015-2018: Debut and “Satisfaction” ===
In early 2015 Xiao Zhan was contacted by one of the produces from the talent/ competition variety show X-Fire, inviting him to audition for the program, he agreed and subsequently won a place on the show. His solo public debut was on the first episode of X-Fire (燃烧吧少年) singing his cover of “Cruel Moonlight” (残酷月光) which aired on Zhejiang Satellite TV on 21 November 2015. On 31 December Xiao, along with the other contestants, participated in the Zhejiang TV New Year’s Eve Concert performing “Freeze” (冻结) and “Be A Man” (燃烧吧少年). After X-Fire concluded in February 2016, X Nine was formed, Xiao and eight others from the show joined the boy band, where he served as one of the lead vocalists. On 28 September a press conference was held for the group’s official debut performance of the self-titled track “X Nine” (X Jiu, X玖) from its mini album of the same name, released four days prior. In 2017, X Nine held their first concert, "In My Own Name," at the Shanghai Stadium and won the Most Popular Group of the Year at the Asia Golden Melody Awards .

In 2018, Xiao recorded his first original soundtrack, “Stepping on Shadows” (踩影子), the ending theme song for the series Oh! My Emperor, in which he plays Beitang Moran.

On 5 October 2018, his 27th birthday, Xiao’s first, personal solo single “Satisfaction” (满足) was released on NetEase Cloud Music. The music video for the single premiered on 16 November.

=== 2019-2023: Popularity, recognition and “Spotlight” ===
In July 2019 Xiao’s original soundtracks for The Untamed album were released, namely "Song Ends with Chen Qing” (曲尽陈情) and "Unrestrained” (Wú Jī, 无羁), a solo and a duet versions, in the series he plays the protagonist Wei Wuxian. On 12 September, his original soundtrack "Asking the Youth" (问少年), for the film Jade Dynasty, was released, in this movie he portrays Zhang Xiaofan. The same year, CCTV-15 presented a special program entitled “I Love You China”, Xiao was invited to sing the tribute song, “My Chinese Heart” (我的中国心, this was as part of the celebrations for the 70th Anniversary of the founding of the People’s Republic of China and aired during the National Day holiday. The performance on 4 October, coincided with the release of this song’s music video, recorded by Xiao for the tribute music album “Youth Sings for the Motherland.” For the same album, he participated in recording of a music video for the song “My People, My Country” (我和我的祖国), together with the original singer, soprano Li Guyi and 15 other inspiring young artists, released both as music video and audio track on September 30. He contributed to the album with another music video, “Best Summer,” a duet released on 5 November.

From October 2019, up to January 2020, Xiao participated in the first season of the variety show, Singing with Legends-Our Song. This was Dragon TV's new program where experienced singers were paired with new singers to compete on the same stage, performing popular classics. For his blind selection, Xiao sang “Satisfaction”, his first single. Some of the classics he performed on the show include duets such as “Follow the Feeling” (跟着感觉走), “Night at the Naval Port”(军港之夜) “Inquiring”(问情) and “Perfect Life”.

In 2020, on 1 January, an official music video “Remaining Years” (Yu Nian, 余年) was released, the ending theme song from the television series Joy of Life 1 ( 庆余年) sang by Xiao who also plays Yan Bingyun in the drama. On 18 January, he performed the song live on stage at the 2019 Yuewen Original Literature Awards Ceremony. On 26 January, he took part in the third edition of the CCTV-1 music variety show Everlasting Classics, program combining Chinese poetry with modern music. Xiao performed the classic “Bamboo and Rock”(竹石) and a duet, the show’s theme song “Thousand Years of Singing”(千年一声唱). On 8 February, during the Lantern Festival, a charity song “Peace and Happiness Every Year” (Sui Sui Ping An , 岁岁平安) was released, a collaboration between Xiao and Li Yuchun (Chris Lee). The song was dedicated to Wuhan, aimed to comfort the public and express hope that loved ones would stay safe during the COVID-19 pandemic. Li Yuchun wrote and composed the song. On 13 April, Xiao participated in the special edition of the Beautiful China music album and reinterpreted the classic patriotic song “Ode to the Red Plum Blossom” (红梅赞), he also published an essay about the song and his cover of the song.

On 25 April 2020, Xiao released his digital single "Spotlight" (光点), globally distributed as "Made to Love", which went on to become the highest selling digital single of all time with over 54 million copies sold. For this song, he entered the Guinness World Records for the fastest-selling digital track in China and Biggest-selling digital single. On 9 March 2021, the single was named the 7th Best Selling Digital Single of 2020 globally by the IFPI, having amassed 1.48 billion subscription stream equivalents worldwide. The song was also listed as one of 10 biggest-selling digital single worldwide by Guinness World Records.

On 25 October 2020, Xiao participated in the Double Ninth Festival Gala ( Chongyang Festival) themed “Years of Flowing Fragrance, Reunion Again on Chongyang,” with his rendition of the classic song “The Brightest Star in the Night Sky” (夜空中最亮的星), televised on CCTV-3. In the later half of 2020, Xiao made an appearance during the finale of the second season of Everybody Stand By, performing “Running to You with All I Have” (用尽我的一切奔向你) by Bibi Zhou. He also performed two songs during the Tencent Video All Star Awards 2020, a duet “The Oath of Love” (余生请多指教) and a solo “The Luckiest Fortune” (最幸运的幸运) the theme songs from The Oath of Love (2022).

In 2021, on 19 February, Xiao released the original soundtrack "Righteous Youth on Horseback” (策马正少年) the theme song for the series Douluo Continent, in which he plays the main character, Tang San. On 5 March, as the Men’s Ice Hockey and the National Stadium Winter Dream Promotion Ambassador, for the 2022 Beijing Winter Olympics, Xiao participated in the Winter Dream Promise show, aired on BRTV. He performed the opening song “Winter Dream” (冬梦), sang alongside children’s choir and his cover of “Something Just Like That”. On 16 October, Xiao sang the theme song “Chinese Power” at the closing ceremony of the 6th Jackie Chen International Action Film Festival Week in Datong, Shanxi Province, China. On 31 December, the original soundtrack, "We Had Been Together" (我们曾经在一起) was released, the ending theme song for Ace Troops, was recorded by Xiao in a duet. He plays Gu Yiye In the drama.

In 2022, on 20 February, Xiao’s music video for the theme song "The Luckiest Fortune” (最幸运的幸运), from the series The Oath of Love, was released, another music video "The Oath of Love” (余生，请多指教) a duet, was released in previous year on Qixi Festival.

In 2023 on 29 June, Xiao had his first appearance at the Greater Bay Area Film and Music Gala in Hong Kong, where he sang "Walk Gracefully Once” (潇洒走一回). The same year, to commemorate the 10th anniversary of the Belt and Road initiative, the China News Network released a tribute song titled "Fellow Travelers," performed by Xiao, officially released on October 16.

=== 2024-present: Established vocalist, recording artist and “WM” ===
At the 2024 China Online Audio-Visual Gala, Xiao made a stage debut for the song "Fellow Travelers" (同路人). The event themed "Together Towards the Future," guided by the NRAT, was broadcast on 3 February. On 10 February, Xiao sang "As You Wish" (如愿) at the 2024 BRTV Spring Festival Gala. The same year On 19 September, during the opening of the Beijing Culture Forum, Xiao performed "The Moon Represents My Heart" at its Performing Arts Gala. On 22 September, Xiao returned to the Greater Bay Area Film and Music Gala, performing a group song “Heaven and Earth Dragon Scale” (天地龙鳞), a duet "Empty World” (這世界那麼多人) and a solo cover of "The Past Is Gone With The Wind “( 往事随风).

WM (我们) is the first physical music album released by Xiao in 2024. It contains 12 songs, and Zheng Nan serves as the music director for the album. The songs were made available in batches for online, free listening from 12 November, then on 19 November, and on 26 November 2024. The physical vinyl record was available for pre-sale from 11 December 2024, with sales exceeding RMB 50 million (about US$7 million) within four minutes of its release. It is the best-selling album of all time on TME Physical Album Sales Chart. On 27 December, at the Asian Pop Music Awards, Chinese language category, Xiao received nomination for Best Male Artist Award for his debut album WM and the track “We”(我们) also known as “Wild” was nominated for the Song of the Year. On 9 March 2025 at the QQ Music Super Peak Night he won the Album of the Year Award and on 24 August, the same year he was presented with the Physical Album of the Year Award, at the 6th Tencent Music Entertainment Awards. On 21 May 2025, Xiao’s music video “Life of Us” (漂流) received Audience Honor in the Design category in Images at the 17th Shorty Awards.

In 2025, on 29 January, Xiao had a stage debut for “Lighthouse”(灯塔) a song from his album WM, at the Beijing TV Spring Festival Gala. The same year, on 28 September, Xiao attended the Greater Bay Area Film and Music Gala in Macao, performing "Music All Night" (整晚的音乐) by Harlem Yu. On 7 December, the music video for the film Gezhi Town is released, Xiao sings the original theme song, titled also “Gezhi Town”(得闲谨制), in the movie, he portrays Mo Dexian. On 31 December, Xiao attended the Dragon TV New Year's Eve Gala, held at the Shanghai Mercedes-Benz Cultural Center where he performed "Gezhi Town” (得闲谨制, "Go Ahead" (不要回头) a song from his album WM and a cover of "What Are You Going To Do If You Don't Dance” (现在不跳舞要干嘛).

In 2026, on 17 February, Xiao made a stage debut of the song "Year after Year" (岁岁年年) at the Beijing TV Spring Festival, aired by BRTV and on all its platforms. The People's Daily Mid-Autumn Festival theme song “Year after Year” by Xiao , officially released on 6 October 2025, was selected as one of twenty Outstanding Songs of 2025 by Chinese Musicians’ Association at the “Hear China, Hear You” Contemporary Song Selection and Performance Event on 15 May 2026. Xiao had a guest appearance at Na Ying’s Beijing concert on 22 August. They sang together “A Thousand Years of Singing” (千年一声唱), it was their second rendition of the song, the first time was on Everlasting Classics show in 2020, he also sang his cover of “Spring Blossoms” (春暖花开).

== Other ventures ==
=== Endorsements and commercial influence ===
Over the course of his career, Xiao has consistently ranked among China's most influential public figures in brand value, driven by continuous commercial demand from both domestic and international consumer markets.

In 2018, Xiao was appointed as a brand spokesperson for South Korean beauty brands Hera and AHC. After the success of The Untamed, he became one of the most sought-after endorsers, collaborating with 19 brands between 2019 and 2020, including mass-market consumer goods and luxury fashion and beauty houses like Lay's, Olay, McVitie's, Braun, Vidal Sassoon, Crest, Luckin Tea, Zwilling J. A. Henckels, Budweiser, Oppo Reno3 Pro, Qeelin, Roseonly, and Piaget. Following his appointment as spokesperson for Estée Lauder's fragrance and beauty line, the brand topped sales rankings during the 11:11 and Black Friday shopping events. In December 2019, he became the brand spokesperson for New Smiling Proud Wanderer, a Perfect World Games' MMORPG, starring as the protagonist Linghu Chong in its concept promotional film.

In 2021, Xiao secured endorsements with 28 domestic and international brands such as Zenith, Molsion, Liushen, Liuliumei, Li-Ning, Tod’s, Gucci, Breo, Mendate, Ocak. Notably, following state-backed boycotts of Western brands due to forced labor allegations in the Xinjiang cotton industry, The Business of Fashion reported that his partnership with Li-Ning significantly amplified the guochao (national trend) movement, contributing to a 56.1% revenue increase for the sportswear giant that year.

In 2022, Xiao expanded his commercial portfolio with 14 new endorsements, including Dove, Darlie, Anessa, Rio, and Maison Margiela. His appointments as brand spokesperson consistently drove significant revenue spikes; the New Year's Day announcement naming him SAIC Audi's face drove over ¥200 million in monthly sales, while his February partnership with NARS Cosmetics generated ¥80 million on its first day. Similar surges followed the April announcement of his ambassadorship for Pepsi, which surpassed ¥100 million in sales by month's end, and mid-year campaigns for L'Oréal PRO and Yves Saint Laurent, which generated ¥40 million in 24 hours and over ¥72 million on a single platform, respectively. Later that year, an August livestream appearance for Li Ning drew 30 million viewers.

By 2023, media outlets and retail analysts frequently referred to Xiao as the "King of Luxury" due to his extensive portfolio of high-end endorsements. This included long-term global ambassadorships with brands such as Gucci, Tod's, Ralph Lauren, and L’Oreal PRO, many of which were established in 2021. Xiao added Oreo, Chali, and Boucheron to his endorsements while upgrading his partnership with Roborock to global brand ambassador. Media coverage frequently highlighted his commercial impact—dubbed the "Xiao Zhan Effect"—noting that a Ralph Lauren fragrance campaign sold 40,000 bottles within six hours of his endorsement. During September's Fashion Month, his digital presence drove significant Earned Media Value (EMV) for major labels; despite his physical absence from the "Gucci Ancora" show, his online promotion generated 10 million Weibo interactions and $3.77 million in EMV. Also that year, he fronted the global 70th-anniversary campaign for Gucci's Horsebit 1953 loafer. Launchmetrics data further indicated that Xiao generated $19.8 million in media value for Tod's, alongside $9.3 million on Weibo following the launch of his Instagram account.

In 2024, Xiao expanded his global endorsements to include Chi Forest, IF Coconut Water, Miiow, Angel, Eve Lom and Saky. He was also named the first global ambassador for the English luxury homeware brand Wedgwood. To mark the appointment, a public mural combining his image with the brand's iconic Portland vase was unveiled in Shoreditch, London.

In 2025, Xiao secured global ambassadorships for Honor, L'Oréal Men Expert, Lamett China, Philips Sonicare and Yue Sai Yuxi. On September 16, he was announced as the brand spokesperson for Meituan.

In 2026, on April 22, Xiao was named brand ambassador for Harmony Intelligent Mobility Alliance (HIMA) specifically for Huawei-SAIC Shangjie Z7 and Z7T( Shangjie brand is a collaboration between Huawei technology and SAIC Motor) to attract younger consumers. His June 2026 appointment as global spokesperson for household brand Super Energy generated over ¥100 million in online sales. That same month, Jing Daily (Note: Jing Daily is an English language online publication based in New York City which focuses on luxury consumer trends in China and Asia.) reported that his collaboration with Tod's sold out its new product line in less than a minute during the 618 shopping festival amidst more than 20 luxury brands vying for consumers' attention.

In May, 2026 Li-Ning officially announced the renewal of the global endorsement deal with Xiao Zhan. Since partnering with him on March 26, 2021, Li-Ning has launched multiple co-branded product lines, each of which has sparked strong consumer demand. Under the renewed agreement, Xiao has been elevated from Global Ambassador for Li-Ning Sports Fashion to Global Brand Ambassador.

Xiao has maintained a multi-year commercial partnership with Mengniu Dairy Group since September 2019, sequentially serving as spokesperson for several of its sub-brands, including True Fruit (2019), Deluxe Ice Cream (2021) and Selected Ranch (2023). In January 2026, he was appointed as brand spokesperson for Mengniu's premium pasteurized milk line, Shiny Meadow, fronting the conglomerate's global marketing campaigns as an official sponsor of the 2026 FIFA World Cup.

=== Philanthropy ===
On 2 February 2015, Xiao participated in the filming of Tencent Video's public welfare short film "Young Self-Save Firewall." Shortly after his 2016 debut, he donated ¥17,000 to the Angel Animal Protection - Animal Care Center to purchase 100 cat nests to keep stray cats warm during the winter.

On 14 May 2019, Xiao participated in the "Book Road Project," jointly organized by the China Foundation for Poverty Alleviation and Sina News APP to raise electronic book resources for poor students. On 29 August, Xiao, as the brand ambassador of Crest, recorded a short video announcing that part of the profits would be used for charity. On 13 November, Xiao supported the public welfare project "Yuanshanli Kids' Football Dream," calling for attention to left-behind children. On 19 November, Xiao participated in the fourth "Everyone is a Volunteer" themed charity event, calling for attention to the autism community.

In January 2020, during COVID-19, his studio donated various medical supplies, equipment and ventilators to hospitals in need. On 8 February, Xiao and Li Yuchun sang the charity song "Peace Every Year" to show their support to those fighting the epidemic. On 26 February, Xiao narrated the anti-epidemic public welfare short video Zhihu's "Thirty-Three," which marked the 33 days of the Chinese New Year in which people jointly fought against the epidemic. On 10 May, Xiao participated in the People's Daily charity live broadcast "Revitalize Hubei, People's Action," donating all profits from charity T-shirt sales to Hubei's economic recovery. On 11 June, the Wei County People's Government and People's Online jointly organized the "Public Welfare to Aid Farmers Media Integration Tour" event, with Xiao serving as the poverty alleviation product experience officer.

In 2021, he also donated ¥1 million (US$210,000) to Zhengzhou Red Cross to help with flood relief in Henan province.

In 2022, Xiao donated ¥500,000 (US$70,500) to the Amity Foundation in support of the epidemic prevention and control work in Shanghai. On 22 April, the procurement of 1,000 material packages was completed, each including rice, edible oil, and milk; another batch of 1,125 material packages had also been purchased, including rice, eggs, milk, edible salt, soy sauce, etc. Subsequent packages were later delivered and received by the towns and neighborhood committees within the Pudong New Area and distributed to groups in need. On 8 September, his studio donated ¥1 million to Red Cross Society to help with earthquake relief efforts in Luding County, Ganzi Prefecture in Sichuang province.

Since 2023, Xiao has been making steady donations to the Huang Xiaoming Tomorrow Charity Foundation through the "Joining Hands for Tomorrow" relief initiatives for those affected by natural disasters—the Gansu earthquake in December 2023, the Tibet earthquake in January 2025, the Beijing rainstorms and floods in July 2025, and the Guangxi flood in July 2026.

=== Ambassadorships ===
Xiao has taken various civic and government-affiliated ambassadorships. These roles focus on cultural diplomacy, international trade, and national tourism promotion, distinct from his state and cultural awards.

List of ambassadorship roles held by Xiao Zhan
| Year | Title / Role | Appointing Body / Event | Notes | Ref. |
|---|---|---|---|---|
| 2020 | Promotional Ambassador | Beijing Television Spring Festival Gala | Promoted the state-run holiday broadcast, performing the opening number "Asking Youth" | |
| 2020 | Poverty Alleviation Product Experience Officer | Yu County Government | Conducted field visits to Yu County and poverty alleviation industries to promote local agricultural and cultural products | |
| 2021 | Member | Shanghai Public Security Bureau Anti-Fraud Alliance | Promoted public awareness campaigns targeting online long cons and fraudulent fund transfers | |
| 2021 | Public Welfare Dream Ambassador | Hangzhou Asian Games Organizing Committee (2022 Asian Games) | Promoted the "Finding 2022 Asian Games Dreams" campaign and recorded the one-year countdown theme song "We Are All Heading For A Better Future" | |
| 2021 | National Stadium Winter Dream Promotion Ambassador and Ice Hockey Sport Promotion Ambassador | 2022 Beijing Winter Olympics | Raised public awareness for ice hockey and the National Stadium venue | |
| 2025 | Promotional Ambassador | WorldSkills Shanghai 2026 Executive Bureau and WorldSkills International | Appointed on World Youth Skills Day to promote vocational education and the 48th WorldSkills Competition | |
| 2026 | Promotional Ambassador | Great Dramas to Watch (Ju Hao Kan) Big-Screen On-Demand Zone | Appointed at the National Radio and Television Administration platform's launch ceremony to promote high-quality digital broadcasting, home entertainment development, and audio-visual cultural content | |

== Media image ==
Several media publications consider Xiao to be among China's most beloved celebrities and versatile leading men of his generation. (Note: Attributed to multiple sources.) In 2019, Forbes China included him in their 30 Under 30 list, which consisted of 30 influential people under 30 years old who have had a substantial effect in their fields. During the APEC Summit, Xiao has been selected for the Asia-Pacific Leaders Under 35 in 2025 list, which recognized entrepreneurial leaders and industry elites who have made contributions to the economic development and social progress of the APAC region. Japanese media hailed him as a leading figure ushering in a new era of Asian cinema. Xiao has also been crowned the Weibo King for three consecutive years (2019, 2020, and 2026) at the Weibo Night, honoring his substantial influence on entertainment and culture.

Tempo reported that Xiao was one of China's highest-paid actors, ranking alongside multi-decade legends like Jackie Chan and Andy Lau. Tatler Asia noted that he is one of the most "bankable C-drama actors" and represents the "gold standard" for his ability to carry large-scale productions with the audience attention. Being the first post-90s actor to win the Best Actor honors, the Flying Tiger Award and CMG Award, respectively, for his works The Legend of Zang Hai and Gezhi Town, he has earned the honorific title "Double Emperor of Film and Television" in his native country.

Beyond successful viewership, Xiao sustains revenues with a portfolio of luxury and mass endorsements that consistently renew. Xiao has been dubbed by Chinese media as the "King of Luxury," being the face of variety of high-end brands such as Zenith, Ralph Lauren, Tiffany & Co., Boucheron, and YSL Beauty, to name a few. He has attended Milan Fashion Week multiple times, notably returning in 2023, 2025, and 2026 as a global ambassador for Gucci and Tod's for fall/winter shows. His most recent front-row appearances in 2026 for both companies in a single day received extensive coverage, ranking in the top 25 most mentioned celebrities on social media with 2.6% share of voice and generated 96% of mentions and engagement according to data-tracking platforms Onclusive and Meltwater. Matteo Tamburini, the creative director of Tod's, drew inspiration for his capsule collections from meaningful creative exchange with Xiao and his distinct take on "simplicity" and "modern, effortless, and versatile" personal style. People magazine noted that his SAIC endorsement provided a tangible testament to his public image of "careful selection and pursuit of quality." Known for his brand value, Chinese media service platform Morketing analyzed his data and interviews, saying that his supporters have high purchasing power that causes company's sales to spike and earn back their investment within hours and double it to equal revenue within a day.

Xiao has been included and topped yearly listings and internet rankings of the world's most handsome and influential men. (Note: Attributed to multiple sources.) His visual appeal have been picked up by several media outlets, appearing on the covers of the Chinese edition of internationally recognized fashion magazines, including Grazia, Elle, BELLA, Cosmopolitan, Harper's Bazaar, Nylon, Vogue, Madame Figaro, Esquire, Marie Claire, and GQ.

Describing his off-screen persona and acting approach, directors and co-stars who worked with Xiao found him to be unpretentious, very polite, and humble. Xiao topped Sohu Entertainment's "Most Media-Favorite Artists of 2025" list, supported by feedback from 60 journalists and entertainment industry professionals. Reviews highlighted his willingness to engage in unscripted interviews and delve into discussions about his craft, noting that his "comments are never empty," and lauded him for his humility, patience, and respect for crew members regardless of his status, describing him as "easy to work with, inclusive, and open-minded." In The Legend of Zang Hai, Cao Yiwen highlighted his crying scenes that were incredibly moving, noting his "meticulous attention to detail." Producer Zhang Ben echoed the same, saying, that he is "very self-disciplined actor with high standards for himself and his creative work." As per Zheng Xiaolong, he may appear "elegant and refined on the surface" but he is able to express what's hidden deep within, adding that he is a "child with understanding" who puts soul into the character that people can empathize with. Kong Sheng selected Xiao's portrayal of Mo Dexian in Gezhi Town, capturing a reaction of an ordinary man who only wants to survive when he is pushed to the edge, for W's movie issue that gathered 21 Chinese film and TV directors to share the "best performance moments treasured in their hearts." Professor Huang Huilin, founder of the Academy for International Communication of Chinese Culture and the Beijing College Student Film Festival, revealed that Xiao meets the "Four Uprights" (in character, artistry, professional work, and pursuits) required of a true cultural and artistic worker.

== 227 incident ==
Starting in February 2020, an organised, online hate campaign targeting Xiao Zhan, his associates and fans, making it difficult /impossible for him and persons connected to him to live normal life and to access work.

On 6 May 2020, he made his first official appearance after the incident in an interview with Economic View, explaining his perspective on the issue. Two days later, Xiao was invited by BTV to perform "Bamboo Rock" (竹石) in support of China's frontline healthcare workers amidst the COVID-19 pandemic in China.

On 19 December 2020, Xiao made his first live performance on the Tencent Video All Star Night Show, where his fans brought lights to show their support; this became known as the "Red Ocean". This resulted in trending topics on Weibo for domestic fans and Twitter for fans abroad, signifying his popularity despite the controversy.

In August 2025, the Beijing Internet Court issued a civil judgment in an online infringement liability dispute involving Chinese entertainer Xiao Zhan and two individuals, Lou Chenjing and Guo Yuwei. According to court documents published on the People's Court Announcement Network and the corporate information platform Tianyancha, the court found that Lou and Guo, identified in reports as moderators of the Sina Weibo "227" super topic, had used a shared Weibo account (UID: 3274253145) to publish content deemed by the court to be factually inaccurate and contributory to online harassment targeting Xiao Zhan.

The court ordered the defendants to publish a formal apology statement on the associated Sina Weibo account for 48 consecutive hours, pay compensation totaling 11,000 yuan to the plaintiff, and cease further dissemination of the contested content.

Legal analysts have highlighted the ruling as a positive development in China's efforts to address online defamation and establishing clearer accountability in digital communication.

== Filmography ==
=== Film ===
| Year | English title | Chinese title | Role | Notes | Ref. |
|---|---|---|---|---|---|
| 2018 | Monster Hunt 2 | 捉妖记2 | Little demon | Cameo | |
| 2019 | The Rookies | 素人特工 | Yuan Jinglin | Cameo | |
| 2019 | Jade Dynasty | 诛仙 | Zhang Xiaofan | Main Lead | |
| 2025 | Legends of the Condor Heroes: The Gallants | 射雕英雄传：侠之大者 | Guo Jing | Main Lead | |
| 2025 | Gezhi Town | 得闲谨制 | Mo Dexian | Main Lead | |

=== Television series ===
| Year | English title | Chinese title | Role | Notes | Ref. |
|---|---|---|---|---|---|
| 2016 | Super Star Academy | 超星星学园 | Fang Tianze | Lead role | |
| 2016 | Shuttle Love Millennium | 相爱穿梭千年貳：月光下的交换 | Boss Liang | Cameo | |
| 2018 | Oh! My Emperor | 哦！我的皇帝陛下 | Beitang Moran | Support role | |
| 2018 | Battle Through the Heavens | 斗破苍穹 | Lin Xiuya | Support role | |
| 2019 | The Untamed | 陈情令 | Wei Wuxian | Lead role | |
| 2019 | Joy of Life | 庆余年 | Yan Bingyun | Support role | |
| 2020 | Heroes in Harm's Way | 最美逆行者 | Cai Ding | Cameo (ep. 7–8) | |
| 2020 | The Wolf | 狼殿下 | Ji Chong | Lead Role | |
| 2021 | Douluo Continent | 斗罗大陆 | | Tang San | Lead Role | |
| 2021 | Ace Troops | 王牌部队 | Gu Yiye | Lead Role | |
| 2022 | The Oath of Love | 余生，请多指教 | Gu Wei | Lead Role | |
| 2023 | The Youth Memories | 梦中的那片海 | Xiao Chunsheng | Lead Role | |
| 2023 | The Longest Promise | 玉骨遥 | Shi Ying | Lead Role | |
| 2023 | Sunshine by My Side | 骄阳伴我 | Sheng Yang | Lead Role | |
| 2025 | The Legend of Zang Hai | 藏海传 | Zang Hai | Lead Role | |
| 2026 | Small Town Remedy | 小城良方 | Liu Zheng Liang | Lead Role | |
| TBA | SpyING | 谍报上不封顶 | Ren Shaobai | Lead Role | |
| TBA | The Infinite 10 Days | 十日终焉 | Qi Xia | Lead Role | |

=== Theatre ===
| Year | English title | Chinese title | Role | Ref. |
|---|---|---|---|---|
| 2021–2023 | A Dream Like A Dream | 如夢之夢 | Patient No. 5 | |

=== Short film ===
| Year | English title | Chinese title | Role | Notes | Ref. |
|---|---|---|---|---|---|
| 2015 | Eighteen | 十八岁 | Xiao Zhan | | |
| 2015 | Heartbreak Singing Machine | 失恋点唱机 | Chen's ex-boyfriend | | |
| 2015 | Youth Self-Saving Fire Defense Wall | 少年自救防火墙 | | | |
| 2016 | Warrior Spirit | 骑士精神 | Wind warrior | | |
| 2016 | The Brightest Star in the Sky | 夜空中最亮的星 | | | |
| 2019 | Feel The World | 慢游旅行家 | | Macau edition | |
| 2019 | Xiao Zhan Lipstick Movie | 口红微电影 | | Estee Lauder short film | |
| 2019 | Family Rules | 家规 | | | |
| 2019 | New Smiling Proud Wanderer | 新笑傲江湖 | Linghu Chong | Concept film | |
| 2020 | Buying Ears | 买耳朵 | | | |
| 2022 | Back | | | JD Electronics short film | |

=== Television show ===
| Year | English title | Chinese title | Network | Role | Ref. |
|---|---|---|---|---|---|
| 2015–2016 | X Fire | 燃烧吧少年 | ZJTV | Cast member | |
| 2017 | Day Day Up | 天天向上 | Hunan TV | Participant | |
| 2017 | Happy Camp | 快乐大本营 | Hunan TV | Participant | |
| 2018 | Produce 101 | 创造101 | Tencent | Guest performer | |
| 2018 | Happy Camp | 快乐大本营 | Hunan TV | Participant | |
| 2019 | Day Day Up | 天天向上 | Hunan TV | Participant | |
| 2019 | Happy Camp | 快乐大本营 | Hunan TV | Participant | |
| 2019 | Ai Si Bu Si | 爱思不si | Kuran | Participant | |
| 2019 | Our Song Season 1 | 我们的歌 | Dragon TV | Cast member | |
| 2019 | Who's The Murderer: Season 5 | 明星大侦探第五季 | Mango TV | Guest ep11,12,13 | |
| 2020 | Everybody Stand By - Season 2 | 演员请就位2 | Tencent | Guest | |
| 2020 | Sweet Tasks Season 2 | 甜蜜的任务 2020 | MangoTV | Guest | |
| 2021 | Marvelous City | 奇妙之城 | Youku | Participant | |
| 2021 | The Winter Dream Promise | 冬梦之约 | | Guest | |
