= Jade Dynasty (film) =

2019 Chinese film

- Film poster
- Traditional Chinese: 誅仙
- Simplified Chinese: 诛仙
- Hanyu Pinyin: Zhū Xiān
- Directed by: Ching Siu-tung
- Screenplay by: Shen Jie; Song Chaoyun
- Based on: Zhu Xian by Xiao Ding
- Produced by: Li Ning; Zuo Runbei
- Starring: Xiao Zhan; Li Qin; Meng Meiqi; Tang Yixin
- Cinematography: William Chan
- Edited by: Angie Lam; Marco Mak
- Music by: Teddy Robin; Wan Pin Chu
- Production companies: New Classics Pictures; Huaxia Film Distribution iQIYI Motion Pictures; Alibaba Pictures; Tao Piao Piao
- Distributed by: New Classics Media
- Release date: 13 September 2019
- Running time: 101 minutes
- Country: China
- Language: Mandarin
- Box office: $57 million

Jade Dynasty (Chinese: 诛仙), also known as Jade Dynasty 1 and Zhu Xian, is a 2019 Chinese fantasy action film directed by Ching Siu-tung and starring Xiao Zhan, Li Qin, Meng Meiqi, and Tang Yixin. The film is adapted from Xiao Ding's eponymous novel. The film was released in China on September 13, 2019.

== Plot ==
The film follows the story of Zhang Xiaofan, a kindhearted and pure village boy who is thrown into a world of chaos after his village gets massacred, and then becomes a disciple of the Qingyun Sect. Zhang Xiaofan learns martial arts from three masters and becomes a master of the mythical realm, while at the same time, experiencing a complicated relationship with three beautiful women, Lu Xueqi, Tian Ling'er, and Bi Yao.

== Cast ==
- Xiao Zhan as Zhang Xiaofan
- Li Qin as Lu Xueqi
- Meng Meiqi as Bi Yao
- Tang Yixin as Tian Ling'er
- Qiu Xinzhi as Tian Buyi
- Cecilia Yip as Master Shuiyue
- David Chiang as Reverend Daoxuan
- Norman Chui as Reverend Cangsong
- Bryan Leung as Zeng Shuqiang
- Bao Xiaosong as Shang Zhengliang
- Chen Liwei as Reverend Tianyun
- Li Shen as Lin Jingyu

== Production ==
The film was shot on locations in Beijing, Sichuan, Henan, and Hebei between October 16, 2018 and January 29, 2019.

== Reception ==
The film topped the mainland Chinese box office on its day of release, grossing 142.22 million yuan.

In Thailand, the Jade Dynasty broke the record of ticket sales for domestic films for the first time in 10 years.

== Soundtrack ==
No.	Title	Lyrics	Music	Singer	Length
1.	"Love Knot (情意结)"	Zhou Xiaoyi	Wan Pin Chu	Zhou Shen
2.	"Asking the Youth (问少年)" (Theme song)	Zhou Xiaoyi	Wan Pin Chu	Xiao Zhan
3.	"Folding Flowers (折花)" (Promotional song)	Zhou Xiaoyi	Wan Pin Chu	Meng Meiqi

== Release ==
Jade Dynasty was slated for release on August 8, 2019 in China but was postponed to September 12, 2019. The release date was later shifted to September 13, 2019.
