= Yan Xujia =

Chinese singer and actor

- 焉栩嘉
- Born: September 23, 2001 (age 24); Yantai, Shandong, China
- Other names: Davis Yan, 808Bass, Jiajia
- Occupations: Rapper; singer; songwriter; dancer; actor
- Years active: 2015–present
- Television: X Fire, Produce Camp 2019
- Musical career
- Genres: Mandopop; Hip hop
- Instruments: Vocals, Guitar
- Years active: 2015–present
- Label: Wajijiwa Entertainment
- Member of: X Nine
- Formerly of: R1SE
Yan Xujia
- Traditional Chinese: 焉栩嘉
- Simplified Chinese: 焉栩嘉
Transcriptions
Standard Mandarin
- Hanyu Pinyin: Yān Xǔjiā

Yan Xujia (Chinese: 焉栩嘉; pinyin: Yān Xǔjiā) is a Chinese rapper, singer, songwriter, dancer and actor. In 2015, he participated the program X-fire and debut as a member of X Nine. Later, he participated in Produce Camp 2019, finished third and debut as a member of R1SE.

== Early life and education ==
Yan was born on September 23, 2001, in Yantai, Shandong. He grew up in Shenzhen. In August 2020, he started his education at the Beijing Film Academy after being placed 23rd nationally in its admissions exams.

== Career ==
=== 2009-2015: Child actor ===
Having been interested in acting from a young age, Yan started his career as a child actor. He began filming advertisements and joining talent shows since 2009. His first acting role began in the 2012 film Legend of Zhong Kui. In March 2011, he filmed The Glamorous Imperial Concubine.

=== 2015-2019: X Nine ===
On July 21, 2015, he took part in the competition X Fire, where in the first episode, he was chosen to be in Li Yuchun's team. He was signed by EE-Media. On September 24, 2016, as part of X Nine, the album X Nine was released. On September 28, he debut as a member of the group X Nine, with Yan as a rapper on the team. He was later signed by Wajijiwa Entertainment.

=== 2019-2021: Produce Camp and R1SE ===
On April 6, 2019, Produce Camp 2019 was released on Tencent Video, with Yan as one of the competitors. On June 8, 2019, in the finals of Produce Camp 2019, Yan finished third with vote of 11,164,384, and debut as a member of the group R1SE. On that same night, the song R.1.S.E. was released as their debut song, which also served as the promo song for the 2019 film Men in Black: International. On June 9, the drama Gank Your Heart was released, in which Yan portraying a young genius Esports competitor. On August 6, the first EP for R1SE was released. On August 11, the mini group reality show Super R1SE was released on Tencent Video. On October 12, Yan participated in the Super Novae Games as part of R1SE. On November 16, R1SE started their national concert tour, beginning in Guangzhou, the second concert was held in Chongqing. However, the third concert in Shanghai was cancelled due to COVID-19. Later, the documentary Autumn with 11 Youths was released on December 1, documenting R1SE crossing paths with youths of their age, and exploring different ways of life. The group's second EP was released as the same time as the documentary.

On January 19, 2020, Yan guest starred on the Hunan TV variety show Happy Camp. On May 29, Yan participated in the competition We Are Blazing as a member of R1SE. On June 12, the anniversary EP of R1SE was released. On June 14, R1SE was disbanded, and Yan updated his Weibo account to include X Nine as part of his account name. In June, Yan was part of filming of a school drama Please Class Mate. The drama was released on April 24, 2021.
