= Ace Troops =

2021 Chinese television series

- Official poster
- Simplified Chinese: 王牌部队
- Hanyu Pinyin: Wáng Pái Bù Duì
- Genre: Action; War; Military
- Directed by: Tian Yi
- Starring: Huang Jingyu; Xiao Zhan; Bai Lu
- Opening theme: "Never Been Apart" by Huang Jingyu, Zhong Chuxi
- Ending theme: "We Were Once Together" by Xiao Zhan, Tan Weiwei
- Country of origin: China
- Original language: Mandarin
- No. of seasons: 1
- No. of episodes: 40

Production
- Producer: Ji Daoqing
- Running time: 45 minutes

Original release
- Network: iQiyi; Jiangsu TV
- Release: December 26, 2021 – January 16, 2022

Ace Troops (Chinese: 王牌部队; pinyin: Wáng Pái Bù Duì) is a 2021 Chinese television drama jointly produced by Beijing iQiyi Technology Co., Ltd., Beijing Contemporary Time Media Co., Ltd., the Propaganda Department of the CPC Changzhou Municipal Committee, the Political Work Department of the Eastern Theater Army, etc., written by Zhou Zhifang, Liu Yan, and Hu Jian, directed by Liu Yan, directed by Tian Yi, starring Huang Jingyu, Xiao Zhan and Zhong Chuxi with special appearance by Bai Lu.

Filming began on August 15, 2020, in Shenyang, Liaoning Province, and took 122 days to complete on December 14, 2020, in Fuzhou, Fujian Province.

== Plot ==
Gao Liang, a recruit from a miner's family, and Gu Yiye, a recruit from a military family, are incompatible and sparks fly because of their very different backgrounds and extremely competitive personalities. On the first day of enlistment, they were both thrown into the most backward team in the division during a dramatic combat training and began their military career. After experiencing confrontation, competition, war, and the fate of sharing weal and woe, they are not only opponents and enemies, but also comrades who cherish each other and share life and death. They have experienced major events such as war, mine clearance in Guangxi, stationing in Hong Kong, and the 1998 flood control, and have also experienced the impact of a series of new military changes in the process of our army's development and evolution from motorized infantry to mechanization and then to informatization. At the same time, the relationship and family life of this pair of enemies are also full of twists and turns and conflicts. The rough Gao Liang and the literary youth Jiang Nanzheng, the aristocratic Gu Yiye and the rural girl A Xiu, the two couples have very different personalities and cultural backgrounds, and their emotional entanglements are complex and subtle, constantly creating episodes under the main plot line. The painful running-in and burning passion are intertwined, and the two military couples finally gain true, pure and beautiful love.

== Cast ==
=== Main ===
Actor	Role	Introduction
Huang Jingyu	Gao Liang	Born in a grass-roots family. Because his brother Gao Shan died in the war, Gao Liang yearned for the army and joined the army. After meeting Gu Yiye for the first time, Gao Liang regarded him as a goal that he had been striving to surpass. During his recruitment period, he met Zheng Yuan and grew up under his guidance. After that, he shined in the army with his excellent ability and his own efforts. In terms of love, after decades of twists and turns, he finally got married with Jiangnan Zhengxiu. Finally, Gao Liang was promoted to the rank of colonel and served as the deputy dean of the Army Special Operations College
Xiao Zhan	Gu Yiye	Gu Yiye gave up the college examination entrance and chose to join the army, with the goal of breaking through his own limits and realizing the ideal of making the army smarter, stronger and more powerful. In the border counterattack, Zhang Fei sacrificed himself to save Gu Yiye, causing Gu Yiye to suffer from post-traumatic stress syndrome. Because of responsibility, Gu Yiye married Zhang Fei's widow, Xiu. Later, in Operation Blue, Gu Yiye commanded the joint information force of the navy, army and air force and fought a beautiful island attack. Finally, he became the deputy chief of staff of a group army in the N theater.
Zhong Chuxi	Jiang Nanzheng	Jiang Nanzheng was born into a musical family. His father was Zheng Yuan, the commander of the 234th Division, and his mother was an excellent music professor. During the border counterattack, Jiang Nanzheng realized the importance of communications, so he gave up being a singer and chose to take the exam to enter the Communication College. He continued to study for a master's degree and became an expert in military communications. Jiang Nanzheng and Gu Yiye were each other's first love, and later he got together with Gao Liang.
Mao Linlin	A Xiu	A Xiu is Zhang Fei's fiancée, beautiful, careful and hardworking. After A Xiu visited Zhang Fei, the two applied for a marriage introduction letter from the army. But not long after, Zhang Fei participated in the border counterattack and eventually died to save Gu Yiye, leaving the pregnant A Xiu a widow. Gu Yiye took on the responsibility of taking care of A Xiu and her son and Zhang Fei's mother. After Zhang Fei's mother died, A Xiu observed mourning for three years and then married Gu Yiye.

=== Supporting ===
- Bai Lu as Hu Yang - She is a determined, strong-willed military surgeon who is compassionate and deeply loyal to her comrades. Set in a world of intense training and combat, Hu Yang’s character is shaped by her resilience and dedication to her duties. Her relationship with Gu Yiye is central to her storyline. She harbors feelings for him, yet he views her more like a sister, valuing their companionship without romantic inclinations. Despite Hu Yang’s hopes, Gu Yiye's affections remain focused elsewhere, creating a subtle tension between them as she silently supports him through challenging missions and personal struggles. Hu Yang’s unrequited love for Gu Yiye brings depth to her character, as she embodies quiet strength and loyalty, remaining steadfast in her role and demonstrating a willingness to put duty above personal desires.
- Li Youbin as Zheng Yuan
- He Zhengjun as Wang Tianming
- Fu Chengpeng as Qin Hanyong
- Xu Honghao as Song Jianshe
- Hou Mengsha as Han Chunyu
- Liu Xiaojie as Zhao Hongying
- Zhao Xun as Niu Mancang
- Zhang Jin as Xia Lin
- Mao Yi as Jiang Weixing
- Xia Houbin as Chen Dashan
- Guan Yajun as Lu Pingfan

== Reception ==
In 2022, Ace Troops was selected as the 2022 iQiyi Scream Night Drama Unit Annual Quality Drama. It also has been shortlisted for the Feitian Award and the Golden Eagle Award in the three major TV drama awards. Even aside from the award factor, "Ace Troops" excelled in all aspects such as ratings, popularity, and social effects. The first broadcast of Jiangsu Satellite TV won the annual champion of Cool Cloud. According to statistics, "Ace Troops" has been broadcast on TV for more than 30 rounds in less than 10 months.

Since the drama's broadcast, Xiao Zhan's emotional scenes impressed viewers and demonstrated his growth as an actor. When Xiao Zhan's captain sacrifices his life to save him from a landmine, he bursts uncontrollably into tears. This scene was very difficult to film, since Xiao Zhan had to adjust his mood and emotions in a short period of time. In the behind-the-scenes footage, the actor could be seen sitting quietly alone as he immersed himself into character before delivering his impactful performance.
