= X Nine =

Chinese boy group

- Also known as: X玖少年团
- Origin: Shanghai, China
- Genres: Mandopop
- Years active: 2016–2025
- Labels: EE-Media (2016–2017); Wajijiwa Entertainment (2017–2025)
- Past members: Xiao Zhan; Gu Jiacheng; Wu Jiacheng; Peng Chuyue; Guo Zifan; Zhao Lei; Xia Zhiguang; Yan Xujia; Chen Zexi
- Website: Official Weibo

X Nine (Chinese: X玖少年团; pinyin: X Jiǔ Shào Nián Tuán, stylized as X-NINE) was a Chinese boy group under Wajijiwa Entertainment. Consisting of eight members: Xiao Zhan, Gu Jiacheng, Wu Jiacheng, Peng Chuyue, Guo Zifan, Zhao Lei, Xia Zhiguang, and Yan Xujia, the group debuted on September 28, 2016 with their first single, "In Our Own Name" (Chinese: 以己之名; pinyin: Yǐ Jǐ Zhī Míng). They were formed through EE Media, Tencent Video, and SM Entertainment's joint Chinese idol survival program X-Fire (燃烧吧少年).

== Name ==
The X in the group's name represents "unknown and infinite possibilities" while the character 玖 (jiǔ) references the Chinese folktale, The Nine Sons of The Dragon (Chinese: 龙生九子; pinyin: Lóng Shēng Jiǔ Zî).

== Members ==
Final

- Xiao Zhan (肖战) – Main vocalist, visuals
- Peng Chuyue (彭楚粤) – Leader, Main vocalist
- Zhao Lei (赵磊) – Main vocalist
- Wu Jiacheng (伍嘉成) – Leader, Main vocalist
- Guo Zifan (郭子凡) – Main dancer
- Xia Zhiguang (夏之光) – Main dancer
- Gu Jiacheng (谷嘉诚) – Rapper, Visual
- Yan Xujia (焉栩嘉) – Rapper

Former

- Chen Zexi (陈泽希) – Rapper, dancer

== Discography ==
=== Single ===
#	Information
1	"In Our Own Name (以己之名)" Release date: September 24, 2016; Label: EE-Media; Language: Chinese
2	"B.O.Y.S." Release date: November 9, 2016; Label: EE-Media; Language: Chinese
3	"Eight Principles of Yong (永字八法)" Release date: December 18, 2016; Label: EE-Media; Language: Chinese
4	"Say No (炫斗青春)" Release date: April 28, 2017; Label: EE-Media; Language: Chinese
5	"We Want What We Want" Release date: January 2, 2018; Label: Wajijiwa Entertainment; Language: Chinese
6	"May I Have Your Heart-IP? (永不下线的,才算爱吗?)" Release date: February 2, 2018; Label: Wajijiwa Entertainment; Language: Chinese
7	"BIG SHOW" Release date: March 16, 2018; Label: Wajijiwa Entertainment; Language: Chinese
8	"Face Face (顏值说)" Release date: April 17, 2018; Label: Wajijiwa Entertainment; Language: Chinese
9	"I Want to Give You (我想给你)" Release date: April 24, 2018; Label: Wajijiwa Entertainment, Zhi Hui Da Gou, and Tian Cai Lian Meng; Language: Chinese
10	"Fights Break Sphere (斗破苍穹)" Release date: August 30, 2018; Label: Dai Mao Hu Yu; Language: Chinese

=== Mini albums ===
#	Album information	Tracklist	Sales	Ref.
1	"X Jiu (X玖)": Release date: September 24, 2016; Label: EE-Media	Tracklist: 1. In Our Own Name (以己之名); 2. B.O.Y.S; 3. Eight Principles of Yong (永字八法)	320,439	
2	"Keep Online": Release date: February 14, 2018 (YES Version) May 9, 2018 (NO Version); Label: Wajijiwa Entertainment	YES Version: 1. We Want What We Want; 2. May I Have Your Heart-IP? (永不下线的,才算爱吗?); 3. BIG SHOW; 4. Face Face (顏值说); NO Version: 1. Like! Like! (你想我吗?) – Wu Jiacheng, Peng Chuyue, Gu Jiacheng, Xiao Zhan; 2. Signal (信号) – Zhao Lei, Wu Jiacheng, Peng Chuyue, Xiao Zhan; 3. Game Player (玩家) – Zhao Lei, Xia Zhiguang, Guo Zifan, Yan Xujia; 4. Fervor (炽热) – Xia Zhiguang, Gu Jiacheng, Guo Zifan, Yan Xujia; lyrics: Gu Jiacheng, Yan Xujia	440,000+	

== Filmography ==
=== Films ===
- Monster Hunt 2 (2018)
- Super Star Academy
- Oh! My Emperor!
- Fights Break Sphere (2018)

=== Variety shows ===
- X-Fire (2015)
- X Nine Channel (2016–2017)

=== Radio ===
- X Nine's Exclusive Radio

== Awards and nominations ==
=== Asian Music Gala Awards ===
Year	Category	Nominated work	Result	Ref.
2017	Most Popular Group Award	—N/a	Won	

=== Asian New Songs Annual Festival ===
Year	Category	Nominated work	Result	Ref.
2017	Most Popular Group Award	—N/a	Won	

=== Tencent Video Starlight Awards ===
Year	Category	Nominated work	Result	Ref.
2016	Boyband of the Year Award	—N/a	Won	

=== Fans Carnival Annual Festival ===
Year	Category	Nominated work	Result	Ref.
2016	Newcomer Group of the Year Award	—N/a	Won	
