= The Wolf (TV series) =

Chinese television series

- Promotional poster
- Genre: Historical fiction; Romance
- Written by: Wu Zhiwei; Huang Jirou; Chen Jianhao; Meng Zhi; Chen Pengwen
- Directed by: Chen Yushan (general); Wang Wei; Cao Hua
- Starring: Darren Wang; Li Qin; Xiao Zhan; Xin Zhilei
- Opening theme: "Wǒ shì shéi" by Jolin Tsai
- Ending theme: "Dào liú" by Jolin Tsai
- Country of origin: China
- Original language: Mandarin
- No. of episodes: 49

Production
- Producers: Chen Yushan (general); Huang Aisha
- Production location: China
- Running time: 45 minutes
- Production companies: New Classic Television Culture Investment Co., Ltd.; Shanghai Youhug Media Co.，Ltd.
- Budget: US$47 million

Original release
- Network: Tencent Video; iQiyi; Youku
- Release: November 19, 2020 – January 14, 2021

The Wolf (Chinese: 狼殿下; pinyin: Láng Diànxià; lit. 'Wolf Highness', 'Wolf Prince') is a 2020 Chinese television series starring Darren Wang, Li Qin, Xiao Zhan, Xin Zhilei, Kuo Shu-yao, and Lin Yo-wei. It aired on Tencent Video, IQIYI, and Youku on November 19, 2020.

== Synopsis ==
Ma Zhaixing, the daughter of Kuizhou city governor Ma Ying, met a kindhearted teenage boy who grew up in the mountain forest. When the teenage boy saved a young wolf, he was implicated in a murder and was hunted down, falling off a cliff. He was adopted as a son by Chu Kui, the emperor of Yang empire, and given the title of Prince Bo. Eight years later, Prince Bo encountered Ma Zhaixing by chance. He liked the wisdom and bravery of Ma Zhaixing. Ma Zhaixing also found that although Prince Bo was in a high status, he still retains his natural kindness and sense of justice. With the support of Ma Zhaixing, Prince Bo opposed harsh governance, helped civilians, supported justice, and prevented brothers from fighting. After going through many trials and tribulations, the two finally found their own happiness.

== Cast ==
=== Main ===
- Darren Wang as Chu Youwen – Prince Bo, Chu Kui's adoptive son.
- Li Qin as Ma Zhaixing, daughter of Kuizhou city governor.
- Xiao Zhan as Ji Chong/Li Ju Yao, abounty hunter whose actual identity is the 2nd Prince of Jin.
- Xin Zhilei as Yao Ji, a killer under Chu Kui who is adept at using poison.
- Kuo Shu-yao as Yelü Baona, a Khitan princess.
- Lin Yo-wei as Zhu Yougui, the second son of Chu Kui.

=== Supporting ===
- Ding Yongdai as Chu Kui, historical prototype: Zhu Wen, king of Yang Kingdom.
- Yan Shikui as Ma Ying, governor of Kuizhou city.
- Zang Hongna as Ma Jing, descendant of a general.
- Wang Jiayi as Zhu Youzhen, the fourth son of Chu Kui
- Ma Dongchen as Mo Xiao, Prince Bo's guard who is the leader of the Night Fury.
- Zhang Xin as Wen Yan, Prince Bo's guard who is a warrior of Night Fury.
- Zhao Cuiwei as Hai Die, a warrior of Night Fury.
- Shi Liang as Li Cunxu, king of Jin Kingdom.
- Gong Zhengnan as Li Jiji, the first son of Li Cunxu.

== Soundtrack ==
The soundtrack album The Wolf Original Television Series Soundtrack was digitally released on November 22, 2020, under NetEase Cloud Music and Migu Music in China. The album was divided into two parts: "Part 1" needs to be paid, "Part 2" is free to listen and download. On December 24, the album was officially released worldwide.

Part 1
No.	Title	Lyrics	Music	Performer(s)	Length
1.	"Who Am I" (我是谁)	Neoh Kim Hin; Jony J	Mourice; Kingman	Jolin Tsai; Jony J	3:59
2.	"Turn Back Time" (倒流)	Chen Li'an; David Ke	Xiao Yu	Jolin Tsai	4:25
3.	"Opposite" (对立面)	Huang Ziyuan	Kingman	Jolin Tsai	3:50
4.	"Who Am I" (渤王心痛 Instrumental)		Mourice; Kingman		1:58
5.	"Sirius" (男女主题思念 Instrumental)		Mourice; Kingman		2:05
6.	"Stone" (疾冲心酸 Instrumental)		Gem		2:11
Total length:					18:28

Part 2
No.	Title	Lyrics	Music	Performer(s)	Length
1.	"Sirius" (天狼星)	Hush	Mourice; Kingman	Xiao Yu	3:51
2.	"Stone" (石头)	Yuen Chen	Gem	Jacob Hwang	3:28
3.	"One More Day" (再一天)	Minnie Hsu	Roal; Miiii	Kuo Shu-yao	3:30
Total length:					10:49

== Production ==
The series was filmed in various locations in China from April to September 2017. The actors stayed at Shangri-La City in Yunnan and Xiangshan Film and Television Town in Zhejiang.
