= The Legend of Zang Hai =

Chinese television series

- Promotional poster
- Simplified Chinese: 藏海传
- Hanyu Pinyin: Zàng Hǎi Zhuàn
- Genre: Revenge; Historical drama
- Created by: Kennedy Xu
- Written by: Zhao Liuyi
- Directed by: Zheng Xiaolong, Cao Yiwen
- Starring: Xiao Zhan; Zhang Jingyi; Zhou Qi; Huang Jue
- Narrated by: Zhao Ming Zhou
- Country of origin: China
- Original language: Mandarin
- No. of seasons: 1
- No. of episodes: 40

Production
- Production location: China
- Running time: 45 minutes

Original release
- Network: Youku; Viu; Netflix; Viki
- Release: May 18 – June 13, 2025

The Legend of Zang Hai is a 2025 Chinese television series produced by Youku, Quantum Entertainment, and Chunyu Film and Television. It was directed by Zheng Xiaolong and Cao Yiwen, and written by Zhao Liuyi.

The series was originally released on Youku and CCTV8 on 18 May 2025. It was later made available on streaming platforms like Viu, Disney+, and Viki.

== Plot ==
After experiencing the massacre of his family, the main protagonist Zang Hai goes through decades of ambush and precipitation, and finally completes revenge with exquisite and reasoned calculations. In the process, after gaining more power, Zang Hai gradually put down his obsession and sought the welfare of the people of the world.

== Cast and characters ==
=== Main ===
- Xiao Zhan as Zang Hai / Zhi Nu
  - Jiang Rui Lin as young Zhi Nu
- Zhang Jingyi as Xiang An Tu
- Zhou Qi as Zhuang Zhi Xing
- Huang Jue as Zhuang Lu Yin / Duke Ping Jin

=== Supporting ===
- Liang Chao as Master Gao Ming
- Song Yuan Fu as Guan Feng
- Yang Bo Xiao as Shi Lei
- Liu Chao as Zhuang Zhi Fu
- Wang Kun Lun as Master Zhang
- Sha Bao Liang as Chu Huai Ming
- Xing Min Shan as Cao Jiang Xian
- Yang Yu Tong as Zhao Tong Er / Ba Gong Zi [8th young master]
- Jin Tie Feng as Shi Yi Ping
- Qiao Zhen Yu as Lord Yong Rong
- Tian Xiao Jie as Shi Bing Wen
- Michelle Bai as Liu Chu
- Yu Nan as Xiang Yu Su Ti
- Zhao Zi Qi as Jiang Xiang
- Zhang Guo Qiang as Emperor
- Xu Ling Yue as Shen Wan
- Liu Ming Ming as Shi Quan
- Tan Yang as Zhuang Shan

and many others

=== Guest ===
- Wallace Chung as Kuai Duo [Zang Hai's father]
- Michelle Chen as Zhao Shang Xian [Zang Hai's mother]
- Huang Jun Peng as Ji Qun
- Lin Ya Dong as King Yan
- Shao Wen as Yang Zhen
- Shi Yu as Eunuch Sun
- Zhang Duo as Master Xing Dou
- Sun Zheng Yu as Song Xin [Old man]
- Lin Ya Dong as King Yan

== Production ==
It started filming in Hengdian on December 30, 2023 and wrapped up mid June 2024. The series tells the story of Zang Hai's life.

== Television soundtrack ==
The Legend of Zang Hai television series features a number of original soundtrack pieces. Below is a list of the tracks included in the official soundtrack release:

The Legend of Zang Hai Original Television Soundtrack
No.	Title	Lyrics By	Composed By	Performed By
1	"It's Me" (Theme Song)	Yi Chu Zhen	Hu Xiaoqiu	Sun Nan
2	"Hidden Star" (Insert Song)	Zhou Jieli	Hu Xiaoqiu	Yuan Yuwei
3	"Blooming Cang Mang" (Insert Song)	Yang Sili, He Lan	Yang Sili	Wang Xinye
4	"Who Waits" (Insert Song)	Yang Sili, He Lan	Yang Sili	Liu Yuxin
5	"Moon Song" (Insert Song)	Zhou Jieli	Hu Xiaoqiu	Dan Yichun
6	"Amidst the Wind and Moon" (Insert Song)	Gu Xing	Chen Xinqing, Mo Qiao	Xilinnayi Gao
7	"Returning to the Moonlight"	—	Yan Qingsai	—

== Reception ==
The Legend of Zang Hai was one of the most highly anticipated Chinese dramas of 2025. It is the first drama to break 9.7 million reservations on Youku. The drama achieved explosive ratings and critical acclaim upon its premiere, exceeding 100 million views and surpassed 10,000 in popularity heat index on Youku just 38 hours after its premiere, becoming the fastest drama to reach this milestone setting a record in the history of the platform. The final episode reached a peak market share of over 40.1%, topping the charts for 23 consecutive days. It also ranked highly on several charts, including the overall online drama series effective viewership ranking and the ranking of newly released drama series with 30 days of effective viewership.

On the first day of the broadcast of Legend of Zang Hai, the peak ratings of CCTV reached 2.4666%. In the first week of its launch, the drama swept the ratings on various major streaming charts: it topped the Disney+ chart in Taiwan for 7 consecutive days. It also topped the charts in Hong Kong. X trends: "Legend of Zang Hai" entered the Trends charts in Thailand, Vietnam, Malaysia, Egypt, Ukraine, India and other places on the day of its launch. #Legend of Zang Hai ranked in the top 12 of the global trend, #ZangHaiZhuan ranked in the top 1 of the Thai trend, and multiple entries related to Legend of Zang Hai and Xiao Zhan ranked in the top 5 in Thailand. It ranked in the top 10 in Vietnam, Malaysia and other regions. In addition, the title and starring related entries entered the top 5 and top 9 of the longest-lasting tag list in Ukraine within 24 hours. The Legend of Zang Hai has exceeded 1 billion views (currently at 3 billion views) and its popularity has skyrocketed. Xiao Zhan's performance was highly praised by the director and he wanted to work with him again.

Its overseas cooperation map spans 15 regions, covering platforms such as Singapore Singtel, Malaysia Astro, Thailand Truevision, Vietnam FPT, Philippines and Indonesia Viu, North America Viki, Cambodia PPCTV, Japan C7, and South Korea SBS. The head of Disney Asia Pacific said: "The Legend of Zang Hai broke the cultural barrier. The data proves that it is not only a hit in China, but also a common choice of audiences around the world."

When asked to comment on the mainland TV series Legend of Zang Hai, which has ranked in the "Top 10 Hot Broadcasts of the Day in Taiwan" for seven consecutive days and media reports from the island indicating that the series is so captivating that viewers cannot bear to stop watching, and they have highlighted the memorable quotes from the series, Zhu Fenglian, a spokesperson for the Taiwan Affairs Office of the State Council said that a large number of original cultural masterpieces have emerged, receiving high market recognition and widespread appreciation from audiences.

In 2025, the Beijing Television Artists Association, with support from the Beijing Municipal Broadcasting authorities, released a curated list of innovative and recommended television works across genres. The Beijing Television Arts Innovation 推优 honors outstanding productions that demonstrate artistic innovation, cultural impact, and industry significance in both content and craft. Inclusion on this list signifies that Legend of Zang Hai is recognized as one of the most noteworthy and artistically innovative dramas of the year by a respected television arts organization in China.

== Accolades ==
Award	Category	Nominee	Results	Ref.
Weibo TV & Internet Video Summit Award (2024)	Most Anticipated TV Series of the Year	Legend of Zang Hai	Won	
China Television Annual Ranking Award (2025)	Jury Award for Anticipated Television Series of the Year	Legend of Zang Hai	Won	
Hengdian Film and Television Festival-11th Wenrong Awards	Outstanding Drama Series of the Year	Legend of Zang Hai	Won	
Hengdian Film and Television Festival-11th Wenrong Awards	Outstanding Young Director of the Year	Cao Yiwen	Won	
Hengdian Film and Television Festival-11th Wenrong Awards	Outstanding Young Creative Producer of the Year	Zhang Ben	Won	
Hengdian Film and Television Festival-11th Wenrong Awards	Quality Organization of the Year	Youku	Won	
Weibo Annual Blockbuster Certification	Most Popular Drama of the Year	Legend of Zang Hai	Won	
Hengdian Film Festival of China	Best Art Direction for a Television Series	Legend of Zang Hai	Won	
Hengdian Film Festival of China	Best Net Drama	Legend of Zang Hai	Won	
Hengdian Film Festival of China	Best Young Director for a Television Series	Cao Yiwen	Won	
21st Chinese American Film and Television Festival-Golden Angel Awards	Best TV Series of the Year	Legend of Zang Hai	Won	
21st Chinese American Film and Television Festival-Golden Angel Awards	Outstanding Young Director of the Year	Cao Yiwen	Won	
8th 初心榜 (“Initial Heart List”) 2025	Annual Outstanding Drama (“年度杰出剧集”)	Legend of Zang Hai	Won	
8th 初心榜 (“Initial Heart List”) 2025	Outstanding Young Director of the Year	Cao Yiwen	Won	
8th 初心榜 (“Initial Heart List”) 2025	Outstanding Young Producer of the Year	Zhang Ben	Won	
Weibo Vision Conference (2025)	Most Influential / Annual Influential Work	Legend of Zang Hai	Won	
16th Macau International Television Festival-Golden Lotus Awards	Best TV Series	Legend of Zang Hai	Won	
16th Macau International Television Festival-Golden Lotus Awards	Best Director	Zheng Xiaolong, Cao Yiwen	Nominated	
16th Macau International Television Festival-Golden Lotus Awards	Best Actor	Xiao Zhan	Nominated	
16th Macau International Television Festival-Golden Lotus Awards	Best Actress	Zhang Jingyi	Nominated	
16th Macau International Television Festival-Golden Lotus Awards	Best Supporting Actor	Huang Jue	Nominated	
16th Macau International Television Festival-Golden Lotus Awards	Best Cinematography	Pan Xing	Nominated	
16th Macau International Television Festival-Golden Lotus Awards	Best Screenplay	Zhao Liu Yi	Won	
Sohu Fashion Awards (2025)	Annual Domestic TV Drama	Legend of Zang Hai	Won	
4th CMG China TV Drama Annual Ceremony	Overseas Influential TV Drama of the Year	Legend of Zang Hai	Won	
4th CMG China TV Drama Annual Ceremony	Newcomer of the Year	Cao Yiwen	Won	
4th CMG China TV Drama Annual Ceremony	Best Actor	Xiao Zhan	Nominated	
4th CMG China TV Drama Annual Ceremony	Breakthrough Actress	Zhang Jingyi	Nominated	
4th CMG China TV Drama Annual Ceremony	Powerful Actor of the Year	Huang Jue	Nominated	
4th CMG China TV Drama Annual Ceremony	Producer of the Year	Cao Ping	Won	
4th CMG China TV Drama Annual Ceremony	Art Director of the Year	Liu Chengyi	Won	
4th CMG China TV Drama Annual Ceremony	Outstanding TV Series of the Year	Legend of Zang Hai	Won	
Beijing Daily's Film and Television Awards	Most Popular Male Actor of the Year	Xiao Zhan	Won	
Beijing Daily's Film and Television Awards	Most Popular Drama Series of the Year	Legend of Zang Hai	Won	
2026 SMG TV Series Quality Awards	Annual Quality Role Model Drama	Legend of Zang Hai	Won	
2026 SMG TV Series Quality Awards	Quality Director of the Year	Zheng Xiaolong, Cao Yiwen	Won	
2026 SMG TV Series Quality Awards	Annual Excellent Quality Star	Xiao Zhan	Won	
2026 SMG TV Series Quality Awards	Annual Quality Producer	Cao Ping	Won	
2026 SMG TV Series Quality Awards	Annual Quality Art Director	Liu Chengyi	Won	
2026 SMG TV Series Quality Awards	Annual Quality Rising Star	Zhou Qi	Won	
2026 SMG TV Series Quality Awards	Annual Quality Highlight Drama Star	Huang Jue	Won	
2026 SMG TV Series Quality Awards	Outstanding Performance Drama Star of the Year	Michelle Chen	Won	
2026 SMG TV Series Quality Awards	Annual Quality Highlight Drama Star	Wallace Chung	Won	
31st Shanghai Television Festival-Magnolia Awards	Best Drama	Legend of Zang Hai	Nominated	
31st Shanghai Television Festival-Magnolia Awards	Best Director	Zheng Xiaolong, Cao Yiwen	Nominated	
31st Shanghai Television Festival-Magnolia Awards	Best Leading Actor	Xiao Zhan	Nominated	
31st Shanghai Television Festival-Magnolia Awards	Best Supporting Actor	Huang Jue	Nominated	
31st Shanghai Television Festival-Magnolia Awards	Best Art Director	Liu Chengyi	Nominated	
31st Shanghai Television Festival-Magnolia Awards	Best Cinematography	Pan Xing	Nominated	
34th Zhejiang Television Peony Awards	Best Television Drama for International Communication	Legend of Zang Hai	Won	
