= People's Republican Party =

People's Republican Party may refer to:

- People's Republican Party (Trinidad and Tobago)
- People's Republican Party (Singapore), see list of political parties in Singapore
- People's Republican Party (British Honduras), British Honduras is the old name for Belize
- Peoples Republican Party, a political party in India, also known as the Republican Party of India (Kawade)

== See also ==
- Republican People's Party (disambiguation)
- Republican Party (disambiguation)
- People's Party (disambiguation)
