= Popular Republican Union =

Popular Republican Union may refer to the following Christian democratic parties in France:

- Popular Republican Union (1919–1946)
- Popular Republican Union (2007)
- Popular Republican Union of Gironde

== See also ==
- Republican Union (disambiguation)
