= The Youth Memories =

2023 Chinese television series

- Promotional poster
- Simplified Chinese: 梦中的那片海
- Hanyu Pinyin: Meng Zhong De Na Pian Hai
- Genre: Youth Drama; Romance
- Written by: Xu Bing, Zhou He Yang
- Directed by: Fu Ning
- Starring: Xiao Zhan; Li Qin
- Country of origin: China
- Original language: Mandarin
- No. of seasons: 1
- No. of episodes: 38

Production
- Producers: Yang Xia, Yang Xiao Pei
- Running time: 45 minutes

Original release
- Network: CCTV; Tencent
- Release: June 1 – June 18, 2023

The Youth Memories is a mainland Chinese TV series set in Beijing in the 1970s that tells an inspirational story of a group of young people growing up, pursuing their dreams, and struggling. The protagonist and his good brothers experienced the college entrance examination, going into business, starting a business, going abroad, and entering politics. In the process of supporting each other, they found the meaning of struggle. The play was directed by Fu Ning, written by Xu Bing and Zhou Heyang, and starred by Xiao Zhan and Li Qin. The official cast was announced in February 2022, and filming was completed in June of the same year. It premiered on CCTV-8 prime time on June 1, 2023.

== Synopsis ==
The Youth Memories is a show about a group of youths and their struggles as they chase their dreams in 1970's Beijing.

== Cast ==
=== Main ===
Actor	Character	Introduction
Xiao Zhan	Xiao Chunsheng	Xiao Chunsheng is optimistic and cheerful by nature, and he is upright and loyal. He is the core figure of the "Shichahai Squad". Xiao Chunsheng has always had a dream of being a hero, but due to family reasons, he could not pass the political review and could not join the army smoothly. He could only carry infinite sincerity and integrate his destiny into the great era. In the years of passion and ideals, Xiao Chunsheng followed the reform and opening up of the motherland, devoted himself to the field of medical equipment, and made great achievements in it. He not only witnessed the progress of history, but also achieved himself.
Li Qin	Tong Xiaomei	Tong Xiaomei, a Beijing girl pursuing her dream of becoming a doctor, [ 3 ] grew up in a relatively democratic family. She is a kind-hearted, gentle and quiet girl, but she is also very opinionated. In her eyes, becoming a doctor is a firm belief. She is willing to serve patients in this world, and is always ready to put on her clothes and go to the battlefield without gunpowder. She likes Xiao Chunsheng's freedom, openness, righteousness and kindness, but the order of appearance made her choose to put away her love, silently give, and work hard to help the other party.

=== Supporting ===
Actor	Character	Introduction
Liu Rui Lin	Ye Guo Hua	Ye Guohua is not aggressive, knows how to respect and understand others, is a gentleman, and is a warm man. Because of his good family conditions, Ye Guohua has a good family background, and with the support of his good friend Xiao Chunsheng, he has never suffered any setbacks since he was a child, and everything has come naturally. Although he and Xiao Chunsheng have been close since childhood, they have gradually become estranged because of emotional issues, and even made wrong decisions at many critical moments, which directly led to the two brothers drifting apart.
Cao Fei Ran	He Hong Ling	He Hongling was born into a musical family. She is good at playing the violin and has a high musical talent. However, due to the limitations of the times and her family background, she is constrained in every way. Her life experience as a teenager made her proud and precocious, and also made her a contradictory person struggling between sensibility and rationality, ideals and reality. The ideal her was attracted to Xiao Chunsheng, and it was a fascinating love. However, in reality, she knew very well that life was never just about love, and Ye Guohua could give her a better life.
Zhao Xin	Ye Fang	Ye Fang and Ye Guohua are twin siblings. They are smart and calm, and can see through many people and things. They are regarded as prophets because they predicted the success of the resumption of the college entrance examination. Ye Fang did not like the marriage arranged by her family, so she used Chen Hongjun, who liked her, to set up a plan to dissolve the marriage. She stayed with Chen Hongjun and urged him to make progress. In the end, Chen Hongjun could not stand Ye Fang treating her like a son, and he could not let Ye Fang give birth to a child for him, so they divorced.
Cui Hang	Chen Hong Jun	Chen Hongjun was from an ordinary family. He was funded and protected by Xiao Chunsheng, Ye Guohua and others. Ye Fang also urged him to study, and he became one of the first batch of college students after the resumption of the college entrance examination. Chen Hongjun's desires grew bigger and bigger. He ignored Ye Fang's advice and joined the customs. When Xiao Chunsheng was frustrated, Chen Hongjun helped him to work in the customs anti-smuggling team, but he was not a good person. Chen Hongjun was resentful and set up a trap to force Xiao Chunsheng to leave. Officer Chen Hong became more and more powerful, and his hands became longer and longer. He colluded with officials and businessmen and was finally imprisoned.
Zhang Ling Xin	Xiao Yan Qiu	Xiao Chunsheng's elder sister. Because her father Xiao Yanpei was isolated for investigation, she couldn't study well when she was young, couldn't get a good job, and missed the best time of love in her youth. Xiao Chunsheng left home to join the army and asked Qi Tian to take care of her. The two gradually attracted each other, started a business together, worked hard together, and finally formed a family and lived a happy life.
Lenox Lu	Qi Tian	Qi Tian is a well-known tough guy in the city of Sijiu. He values friendship and loyalty. Because his brother Guo Heizi threw Chen Hongjun's hat away, he had a formal contact with Xiao Chunsheng. He gradually obeyed Xiao Chunsheng and recognized him as a brother. Entrusted by Xiao Chunsheng, he took care of Xiao Yanqiu during his time in the army. After getting along with her, Qi Tian started a business with her, worked hard together, and got married together. Finally, at the invitation of Xiao Chunsheng, he joined Xiao Chunsheng's Chunxiao Medical Business.

== Reception ==
This series has captivated attention since its casting and production to its on-air debut. The conscientious craftsmanship of the production team, evident in details like costumes and props, coupled with the dedicated performances of the group of young actors, has resulted in the show achieving both impressive viewership ratings and positive acclaim.

The show has consistently exceeded 2% in real-time TV ratings, and it has also been the top show among shows airing in the same time slot. The Youth Memories has a heat index of 30,000 on Tencent. It has become the first to cross 30,000 and also the first big hit for the streaming platform in 2023.

PR Times article says The Youth Memories starring Xiao Zhan achieved an astonishing record of surpassing 100 million viewer comments in the fastest time ever. In addition, it has won more than 20 prestigious awards, including the 2023 China-Beijing Television Drama Festival and the Weibo Viewpoint Awards, and its reputation is growing both at home and abroad. In addition, a special screening was held prior to the broadcast in Japan, attracting many fans from all over the country and attracting attention to this work.

== Awards ==
Year	Award Ceremony	Award	Finalist	Result	Ref
2023	19th Chinese American TV Festival Golden Angel Awards	Outstanding Actor	Xiao Zhan	Won	
2023	2nd Chinese TV Drama CMG Annual Ceremony	Breakthrough Actor of the Year	Xiao Zhan	Won	
2024	Beijing News 2023 TV Series/Actor List	Most Popular TV Series of the Year	The Youth Memories	Won	
2024	Beijing News 2023 TV Series/Actor List	Breakthrough Actor of the Year	Xiao Zhan	Won	
2024	2024 Capital TV Program Spring Promotion Conference	Quality TV Series of the Year	The Youth Memories	Won	
2024	CMG Second Annual Chinese TV Drama Awards	Breakthrough Actor of the Year	Xiao Zhan	Won	
2024	China Quality TV Drama Awards	Most Media Focused Actor of the Year	Xiao Zhan	Won	
