= Small Town Remedy =

Upcoming Chinese television series

- Simplified Chinese: 小城良方
- Hanyu Pinyin: Xiao Cheng Liang Fang
- Genre: Medical; Drama; Life
- Written by: Nie Cheng Shuai
- Directed by: Zhang Xiao Bo
- Starring: Xiao Zhan
- Country of origin: China
- Original language: Mandarin
- No. of seasons: 1
- No. of episodes: 30

Production
- Production location: China
- Running time: 45 minutes

Original release
- Network: iQiyi

Small Town Remedy (sometimes also translated as Small Town Prescription) is an upcoming Chinese television drama, produced by Ningmeng Pictures (柠萌影视) and co-produced with iQIYI. The drama is written by Nie Chengshuai, directed by Zhang Xiaobo, with Su Xiao as the executive producer and Xia Jie as the producer.

== Plot ==
The story centers on Liu Zhengliang, a talented doctor (neurosurgeon) who, after a major setback, returns to his small hometown to rebuild his life. In his hometown, he connects with a group of "unreliable" but kind-hearted people, and together they tackle meaningful issues, especially relating to primary healthcare in rural or small-town settings.

== Cast and characters ==
=== Main ===
- Xiao Zhan as Liu Zheng Liang
- Ni Da Hong as Long Dong Dong
- Jiang Yan as Ai Chen
- Shi Peng Yuan as Liu Zheng Guang
- Jian Ren Zi as Che Ming Ming
- Zhang Guo Qiang as Huang Dong Sheng

=== Supporting ===
- Wang Yan Lin as Chen Jun Nan
- Chen Jin as Mi Si

== Production ==
The series is being mainly filmed in the Jinzhou, Liaoning. Filming started on 18 October 2025 and is set to wrap in Feb 2026. The drama was featured at the 2025 Tokyo International Film Festival China pavilion, signaling early international interest.

It is expected to premiere on the streaming platform iQIYI and Viu in 2026.
