= Republican faction =

Republican faction may refer to:

- Republic of China nationalism, also called the "Republican faction" (民國派).
  - Pro–Republic of China sentiment
  - Pro-ROC camp (Hong Kong)
- Republican faction (Spanish Civil War)

== See also ==
- Republican (disambiguation)
