= Gezhi Town =

- Theatrical release poster
- Simplified Chinese: 得闲谨制
- Directed by: Kong Sheng
- Written by: Lan Xiaolong
- Produced by: Hou Hongliang
- Starring: Xiao Zhan; Peng Yuchang; Zhou Yiran; Yang Xinming; Alan Aruna; Gan Yunchen; Zhou Siyu; Yin Zheng
- Cinematography: Zeng Jian
- Edited by: Derek Hui
- Music by: Guo Sida
- Production companies: Daylight Entertainment Co., Ltd. Tianjin Maoyan Weiying Media; China Film Group Corporation; Yichang Sanxia Media; Tencent Penguin Pictures; Sina Entertainment
- Distributed by: CMC Pictures
- Release date: 6 December 2025
- Running time: 122 minutes
- Country: China
- Language: Mandarin
- Box office: US$60.7 million

Gezhi Town is a 2025 Chinese war drama film directed by Kong Sheng, written by Lan Xiaolong, and produced by Hou Hongliang. The project has been in development for nine years and marks Daylight Entertainment's first venture into the film industry. The film features an ensemble cast led by Xiao Zhan, Peng Yuchang, and Zhou Yiran, with Yang Xinming, Alan Aruna, Gan Yunchen, Zhou Siyu, and Yin Zheng in supporting roles. It is set during the Battle of West Hubei in the Second Sino-Japanese War. The film was released in China on December 6, 2025.

== Plot ==
After the fall of Nanjing and a large evacuation, a group of refugees / civilians flee to a remote mountain/small-town area near Yichang (or deep mountain region). They settle in what becomes a small town / refuge zone. The peace is disrupted when a group of Japanese soldiers accidentally enter, causing a confrontation. Led by "ordinary" labor-class people (not professional soldiers), including Mo Dexian, these displaced civilians are forced to defend their home

== Cast ==
- Xiao Zhan as Mo Dexian
- Peng Yuchang as Xiao Yan
- Zhou Yiran as Xia Cheng
- Yang Xinming as Grandpa Mo
- Alan Aruna as Ma Guofu
- Gan Yunchen as Mei Defu
- Zhou Siyu as Kang Lingbao
- Yin Zheng as Okawara

== Production ==
The film, which tells the story of the Battle of Yichang was filmed in Yichang and surrounding areas in Hubei Province, China. The filming started in mid July 2024 and was completed in October 17th 2024. The crew also sent a letter of thanks to the Yichang Museum for lending out many folk artifacts.

According to screenwriter Lan Xiaolong, the creation of "Gezhi Town" stemmed from a long-standing friendship among the main creators. The script was completed ten years ago, and the biggest impetus for this collaboration was the long-standing friendship with Kong Sheng and Hou Hongliang. Directors Kong Sheng and Lan Xiaolong conducted multiple on-site inspections to find a filming location that matched the atmosphere of "Gezhi Town," ultimately choosing Yichang as the main filming location. "The mountains and waters here have a unique sense of layering, possessing both the grandeur of the Three Gorges and the simplicity of village dwellings, perfectly matching our imagination of the story's setting." This extreme pursuit of scene authenticity is also a direct manifestation of the "carefree" spirit.

== Reception ==
According to real-time data from Maoyan Professional Edition, as of 10:36 PM on December 3rd, the presale box office for “Gezhi Town”, has officially exceeded 100 million yuan and grossed over 100 million yuan on its opening day, taking nearly 15 hours to achieve the best opening day performance for a domestic film since late September.

On December 5th, Daylight Entertainment's first theatrical film, "Gezhi Town," held a special screening and meet-and-greet with the cast and crew in Yichang. Director Kong Sheng, executive producer Hou Hongliang, lead actors Xiao Zhan and Zhou Yiran, along with supporting actors Aruuna, Gan Yunchen, Zhou Siyu, and Yan Zhidu, attended the event. They watched the film together with veterans of the War of Resistance Against Japan, retired soldiers, role models, historical experts, and media reporters, and shared their creative insights. The film was released nationwide on December 6th.

The film has received high praise from audiences, achieving a score of 9.6 on Taopiaopiao, 9.6 on Lighthouse Pro, 8.6 on IMDb, 8.5 on Douban with over 50,000 reviews, a 9.7 rating on Maoyan [1]with 2,41,000 people indicating that they want to see it, emphasizing its high production value and emotional resonance, and an 8.8 rating from professional film critics. It blends the fates of ordinary people with historical narrative, showcasing the beauty of humanity and spirit of craftsmanship. Short reviews repeatedly mention "Daylight Entertainment's quality assurance" and "Xiao Zhan's groundbreaking performance.

== Accolades ==
| Award | Category | Nominee | Results | Ref. |
|---|---|---|---|---|
| Asian Art Film Festival-Golden Petrel Awards | Best Director | Kong Sheng | Won | |
| Asian Art Film Festival-Golden Petrel Awards | Best Actor | Xiao Zhan | Won | |
| Asian Art Film Festival-Golden Petrel Awards | Best Screenplay | Lan Xiaolong | Won | |
| Asian Art Film Festival-Golden Petrel Awards | Best Film | Gezhi Town | Nominated | |
| Asian Art Film Festival-Golden Petrel Awards | Best Supporting Actor | Yin Zheng | Nominated | |
| Asian Art Film Festival-Golden Petrel Awards | Best Art Direction | Gezhi Town | Nominated | |
| 33rd Beijing College Student Film Festival-Flying Tiger Awards | Most Popular Annual Male Actor | Xiao Zhan | Won | |
| 21st Changchun Film Festival-Golden Deer Awards | Best Film | Gezhi Town | Won | |
| 21st Changchun Film Festival-Golden Deer Awards | Best Music | Guo Sida | Won | |
| 39th China Film Golden Rooster Awards | Best Art | Wang Jing | Won | |
