= Republican Movement =

Republican Movement may refer to:

- Australian Republican Movement
- New Zealand Republic (formerly Republican Movement of Aotearoa New Zealand)
- British republican movement
- Citizens for a Canadian Republic
- Republican Movement (Colombia)
- Republican Movement (Ireland)
- Republican Movement (Mauritius)
- Republican Democratic Movement, a political party in Rwanda
- Senegalese Republican Movement
- Republican Movement (Switzerland)
- Movimiento Republicano, the Venezuelan Republican Movement
- Welsh Republican Movement

== See also ==
- Republican (disambiguation)
- Republicanism
