= Republican Party (Estonia) =

Estonian political party

The Republican Party (Estonian: Vabariiklik Partei) was a political party in Estonia, founded in 1999. The chairman of the party was Kristjan-Olari Leping, a lecturer of economic theory at the pärnu college of the University of Tartu. The party was of neo-conservative, new rightist and national conservative orientation; it identifies itself as close to Pro Patria Union and Reform Party of Estonia, but more radical. The organization was also strongly eurosceptic.

On 19 May 2005 the party had 1080 members. The party had participated only in local election (in Pärnu). The members are mostly younger people, esp. college students. The party was more active during the pre-2003 period, in the course of debate over EU membership. The Republicans cooperated with other minor parties that opposed the EU entry (Estonian Social Democratic Labour Party, Estonian Independence Party, Estonian Christian Democrats).

== See also ==
- Estonian Independence Party
- Libertas Estonia
