= Republican Union =

Republican Union may refer to:

- Republican Union (France)
- Republican Union (French Somaliland)
- Republican Union (Portugal)
- Republican Union (Puerto Rico)
- Republican Union (Spain, 1886)
- Republican Union (Spain, 1903)
- Republican Union (Spain, 1934)

== See also ==
- Popular Republican Union (disambiguation)
- Republican (disambiguation)
- Republic (disambiguation)
- Republicanism
