= Oh! My Emperor =

2018 Chinese web television series

- 哦！我的皇帝陛下
- Genre: Romance; Historical drama; Comedy; Fantasy
- Written by: Yu Haixia; Yin Hang
- Directed by: Gao Bo
- Starring: Gu Jiacheng; Zhao Lusi; Xiao Zhan; Wu Jiacheng; Peng Chuyue; Chen Zexi; Yan Xujia; Xie Lintong; Song Nanxi
- Opening theme: "I want to give you" by X Nine
- Ending theme: "Movement" by Cyndi Wang
- Country of origin: China
- Original language: Chinese
- No. of seasons: 2
- No. of episodes: 42

Production
- Running time: 25 minutes

Original release
- Network: Tencent Video
- Release: April 25, 2019

Oh! My Emperor (Chinese: 哦！我的皇帝陛下; pinyin: Ó! Wǒ de huángdì bìxià) is an ancient costume love idol drama jointly produced by Wajijiwa Entertainment, Tencent Pictures and Wugu Yuanfeng Culture Media, directed by Gao Bo, Gu Jiacheng, Wu Jiacheng, Xiao Zhan, Zhao Lusi, Peng Chuyue, Chen Zexi, Yan Xujia, Xie Lintong and Song Nanxi co-starred, and Wang Yu played a special role.

The play tells the story of Luo Fei Fei, a 21st-century doctor, who is transported to a mysterious world of the past: Huang Dao Guo. In that nation, leadership is rotated among the twelve constellations every thousand years. The current emperor is Bei Tang Yi of the Capricorn constellation.

The play is divided into two seasons. The first and second seasons were broadcast exclusively on Tencent Video on April 25, 2018, and May 23, 2018.

== Synopsis ==
In the glorious nation of Huang Dao, life is good. An ancient and mysterious land, full of wonder and beauty, the people enjoy a good life ruled by a benevolent king, born of the stars, the physical embodiment of one of the twelve constellations of the zodiac. To keep discord from arising among the other stars, a new king is chosen every thousand years.

As current emperor of the Huang Dao nation, Bei Tang Yi (Gu Jia Cheng), of the Capricorn constellation, is charged with keeping the peace. But everything changes the day Luo Fei Fei (Zhao Lu Si) appears, almost as if by magic.

A medical intern from the 21st century, Fei Fei has no idea where she is or how she came to be there but one thing is certain, her sudden arrival manages to disrupt the delicate balance of power that holds the zodiac members together. Setting off a chain of events that threaten to ruin everything, Fei Fei finds herself the villain in a story she barely understands.

With no idea how she came to Huang Dao, and no idea as to how to get back to her own time, Fei Fei must find a way to survive in this strange new world. Fortunately, she has the emperor’s uncle, Bei Tang Mo Ran (Xiao Zhan) on her side. But will that be enough to save her from the watchful eyes of an emperor who can’t seem to find a way to let her go?

== Cast ==
=== Main ===
- Zhao Lusi as Luo Feifei (洛菲菲)
  - Luo Feifei is a medical intern from the 21st century. Due to an accident, she traveled to the mysterious and ancient country—Huang Dao, the Zodiac Kingdom. In the Zodiac Kingdom, Luo Feifei is the successor star lord of Ophiuchus.
- Gu Jiacheng as Bei Tang Yi (北堂弈)
  - Beitang Yi is the star lord of Capricornus, and the current king of the Zodiac, with the ability to petrify. When Beitang Yi succeeded to the throne, he had no military power in his hands, and wanted to get military power from his uncle Beitang Moran to realize military and political unification.
- Xiao Zhan as Bei Tang Mo Ran (北堂墨染)
  - Beitang Moran is the star lord of Aquarius, the uncle of Beitang Yi, who has the ability to predict. Moran was ordered by the late emperor to take charge of the military power and exercise the responsibility of assisting the government; when Beitang Yi proposed to return the military power, Mo Ran set up a difficult test for him, and finally Beitang Yi passed the test, and Mo Ran returned the military power. Because Beitang Moran foresaw that Luo Feifei was closely related to the fate of Huang Daoguo, he protected her in many ways, and found that he had a deep-rooted love for her during the relationship.
- Wu Jiacheng as Bei Tang Tang (北堂棠)
  - Bei Tangtang is the star lord of Pisces, the younger brother of Bei Tangyi, who has the ability to clone. Bei Tangtang saw the affection between his brother and Luo Feifei, and tried his best to match the two. Because Xi Fenglie was taken to the Orion country, Bei Tangtang sneaked into the Orion country to save people, discovered the conspiracy of the Orion country, and at the same time fell in love with Xia Bing at first sight.

=== Supporting ===
- Peng Chuyue as Bai Wuchen (白无尘)
  - Bai Wuchen is the star lord of Virgo, a celebrity of the zodiac, and has the ability of telekinesis. Bai Wuchen and Chu Shengnan are childhood sweethearts and have a marriage contract. At the beginning, Chu Shengnan didn't like Bai Wuchen, but Bai Wuchen followed her all the time and greeted her well. At the same time, with the help of Luo Feifei and Xie Yanran, Bai Wuchen finally moved Chu Shengnan.
- Xie Lintong as Chu Shengnan (楚胜男)
  - Chu Shengnan is the star lord of Leo, the female general of Huang Guodao, who has the ability of lion roar. Chu Shengnan is straightforward and generous. Although he is a daughter, he has the spirit of not losing a man, and he takes protecting Huang Daoguo as his duty.
- Song Nanxi as Xie Yanran (谢嫣然)
  - Xie Yanran is the star lord of Cancer, the daughter of the Prime Minister of the Zodiac, and has the ability of invisibility. Although Xie Yanran was regarded as the future queen by the royal family of Huang Daoguo, she fell in love with Beitang Moran; for this reason, Xie Yanran encouraged Luo Feifei to pursue the emperor Beitang Yi, so that she could avoid marrying into the palace, and she bravely went to find her love.
- Emn Chen as Su Xun Xian (苏寻贤)
  - Su Xun Xian is the star lord of Gemini, (...), and can speak with animals fluently. (...)
- Yan Xu Jia as Shang Yu (尚宇)
  - Shang Yu is the star lord of Aries, (...), and has the ability of super speed. (...)
- Zhou Zhuo as Fang Jian (方健)
  - Fang Jian is the star lord of Scorpio, (...), and can create an invisible barrier. (...)
- Li Wei Xi as Mei Da Ren (梅大仁)
  - Mei Da Ren is the star lord of Taurus, (...), and has the ability to determine outcomes. (...)
- Huang Tian Yu as Xi Feng Lie (西风烈)
  - Feng Lie is the star lord of Sagittarius, (...), and has the ability to control fire. (...)
- Liu Lang as Zhang Tian Zheng (张天正)
  - Zhang Tian Zheng is the star lord of Libra, (...), and has the ability to puppeteer individuals. (...)

== Episodes ==
=== Series overview ===
Season	Episodes	Originally released
1	21	April 25, 2018
2	21	May 23, 2018

== Production ==
Song Nanxi revealed that everyone would learn various dialects during breaks on the set, and she and Wu Jiacheng shared dialect secrets with each other, and asked the other party to correct their Cantonese pronunciation. In addition, people usually make funny faces, save ugly photos, and make emoticons to make jokes.

The play was filmed in many places such as Tianmo, Kangxi Grassland and Baihe Grand Canyon, and was also filmed in many film and television bases such as China Film and Xingmei.

== Soundtrack ==
Title	Lyricist	Composer	Singer	Notes
《我想给你》I want to give you	Yuan Bo & Xiao Chuan	Yuan Bo	X Nine	Opening song
《境迁》Movement	Pei Zhisen	Zhang Weihao	Version 1: Wang Xinling Version 2: Wang Xinling, Wu Jiacheng	Ending theme
《好像掉进爱情海里》Like falling into the sea of love	Zhang Weihao	Zhang Weihao	Version 1: Zhao Lusi Version 2: Gu Jiacheng, Zhao Lusi	
《她》Her	Liao Juntao	Liao Juntao	Liao Juntao	
《有你的世界》A World With You	Yuan Bo	Yuan Bo	Peng Chuyue	
《踩影子》Tread the Shadow	Peng Chuyue	Peng Chuyue	Xiao Zhan	
《两个世界》Two Worlds	Zhang Weihao	Zhang Weihao	Zhang Weihao	
《我在人民广场跳广场舞》I'm Dancing in the People's Square	Cui Shu	Lu Shilang	Cui Zige	
《一程山路》A Mountain Road	Mao Buyi	Mao Buyi	Mao Buyi	
