= Republican People's Party (disambiguation) =

The Republican People's Party is a political party in Turkey.

Republican People's Party may also refer to:

- Republican People's Party (Egypt)
- Republican People's Party (El Salvador)
- Republican People's Party (Kazakhstan)
- Republican People's Party (Moldova), now called "Our Party"

== See also ==
- People's Republican Party (disambiguation)
- Republican Party (disambiguation)
- People's Party (disambiguation)
