= Liberal Republican Party =

Liberal Republican Party may refer to:

- Liberal Republican Party (Republic of the Congo), a party active in parliament
- Liberal Republican Party (Turkey), a short-lived party active in 1930
- Liberal Republican Party (United States), which contested the 1872 presidential election

== See also ==
- Liberal Republican Right, an interwar party in Spain
- Rockefeller Republican, a faction of the US Republican Party
- Republican Liberal Party (Panama), a defunct political party in Panama
- Republican Liberal Party (Portugal), an interwar party in Portugal
