= Republican =

Republican may refer to:

== Political ideology ==
- An advocate of a republic, a type of government that is not a monarchy or dictatorship, and is usually associated with the rule of law.
  - Republicanism, the ideology in support of republics or against monarchy; the opposite of monarchism
    - Republicanism in Australia
    - Republicanism in Barbados
    - Republicanism in Canada
    - Republicanism in Ireland
    - Republicanism in Morocco
    - Republicanism in the Netherlands
    - Republicanism in New Zealand
    - Republicanism in Spain
    - Republicanism in Sweden
    - Republicanism in the United Kingdom
    - Republicanism in the United States
  - Classical republicanism, republicanism as formulated in the Renaissance
- A member of a Republican Party:
  - Republican Party (disambiguation)
  - Republican Party (United States), one of the two main parties in the United States
  - Fianna Fáil, a conservative political party in Ireland
  - The Republicans (France), the main centre-right political party in France
  - The Republican Proposal, PRO, Republican Party of Argentina
  - Republicans (Brazil), a conservative political party in Brazil
  - Republican People's Party (disambiguation)
- Particular governments that called themselves republics, including:
  - List of republics
  - Roman Republic, as well as supporters of the Republic during the Roman Empire
  - Second Spanish Republic, during the Spanish Civil War, as well as its supporters
    - Republican faction (Spanish Civil War)
  - Islamic Republic of Afghanistan, which governed Afghanistan from 2004 to 2021
    - Republican insurgency in Afghanistan
  - Various French Republics, most notably the First Republic established during the French Revolution and the Second Republic, the first post-Revolution republic in France

== People ==
- Upper Republican, a distinct culture of Native Americans along the upper Republican River

== Publications ==
- The Republican, a British newspaper established as Sherwin's Political Register by Richard Carlile in 1817 and renamed in 1819
- The Republican (Springfield, Massachusetts), a newspaper published in Springfield, Massachusetts
- Lawrence Republican, a defunct newspaper published before the American Civil War in Lawrence, Kansas
- Missouri Republican, newspaper based in St. Louis, Missouri (1808–1919)
- Woodville Republican, a weekly newspaper published in Woodville, Mississippi

== Places in the United States ==
- Republican City, Nebraska, a village in the state of Nebraska
- Republican River, a river that flows through Colorado, Nebraska, and Kansas
- Republican Township, Jefferson County, Indiana
- Republican Township, Clay County, Kansas
- Republican, North Carolina

== See also ==
- Republic (disambiguation)
- Republicain (disambiguation)
- Republican faction (disambiguation)
- Republican Movement (disambiguation)
- Republican Union (disambiguation)
- Republican Party (disambiguation)
- Republican People's Party (disambiguation)
- The Republicans (disambiguation)
