= New Classics Media =

Chinese entertainment media production company

- Type: limited liability company
- Industry: Television production
- Founded: February 7, 2007; 19 years ago in Dongyang
- Founder: Huayi Cao (曹华益)
- Headquarters: 26th Floor, Fosun International Center No.237, Chaoyang North Road, Beijing, Chaoyang District
- Area served: China
- Key people: Huayi Cao
- Products: television series, films, Film and television clothing rental
- Total assets: 16.5 billion RMB (2007)
- Owners: Tencent
- Parent: Tencent
- Website: https://www.ncmchina.com/

New Classics Media (Chinese: 新丽传媒) is a Chinese entertainment and media company established in 2007 that primarily invests in and produces Chinese television dramas and films. It has participated in and initiated many film and television productions. The company specializes in the production and distribution of Chinese historical costume dramas, offering services such as script discovery, costume design, prop sourcing, and publicity. It has been owned by publicly listed China Literature, the ebook business unit under Tencent, since 2018.

== Productions ==
Year	English title	Notes
2012	Beijing Love Story	
2015	Tiger Mom	
2016	The Imperial Doctress	
2016	Yu Zui	
2016	Rookie Agent Rouge	
2017	White Deer Plain	
2017	The First Half of My Life	
2017	Rule the World	
2018	The Evolution of Our Love	
2018	Ruyi's Royal Love in the Palace	
2018	Battle Through the Heavens	
2019	Fall in Love at First Kiss	Feature film
2019	Jade Dynasty	Feature film
2019	Joy of Life	
2019	The Wolf	
2020	Soul Land	Animated film
2020	Awakening of Insects	
2020	The Deer and the Cauldron	
2020	City of Desire	
2020	My Best Friend's Story	
2021	The Rebel	
2022	A Lifelong Journey	
2024	Joy of Life 2	
2024	Guardians of the Dafeng	
