= Republican Party =

Republican Party is a name used by many political parties around the world, a reference to republicanism, a political ideology.

Republican Party may refer to:

== Africa ==
- Republican Party (Liberia)
- Republican Party (Malawi)
- Republican Party (Namibia)
- Republican Party (Tunisia)
- Republican and Liberal Party, political party in Republic of Congo
- Republican Party (Zambia)

== Americas ==
=== Brazil ===
- Republicanos
- Party of the Republic, in Brazil
- Republican Party (Brazil), active 1945–1965
- Republican Party of São Paulo, active in Brazil 1873–1937
- Republican Party of the Social Order, in Brazil

=== Canada ===
- Republican Party (Canada)
- Republican Party of Canada
- Republican Party of Alberta

=== Chile ===
- Republican Party (Chile, 2019)
- Republican Party (Chile, 1982), active in Chile 1982-1987

=== United States ===
- Republican Party (United States), active since 1854
- American Republican Party (1843), active c. 1840s
- Democratic-Republican Party, active c. 1790s–1820s
- Liberal Republican Party (United States), active 1872
- National Republican Party, active c. 1820s
- Puerto Rico Republican Party
- Republican Party of the Virgin Islands

=== Other Republican Parties in the Americas ===
- Republican Party (Jamaica)

== Asia ==
=== India ===
- Republican Party of India
  - Factions, splinter groups and attempts at unification:
    - Republican Party of India (Athawale)
    - Republican Party of India (Gavai)
    - Peoples Republican Party
    - Republican Party of India (Democratic)
    - Republican Party of India (Kamble)
    - Republican Party of India (Khobragade)
    - Republican Party of India (United)

=== Other Republican Parties in Asia ===
- Republican Party of Afghanistan
- Republican Party (Cambodia)
- Republican Party (China)
- Republican Party (Indonesia)
- Islamic Republican Party, in Iran
- Republican Party (Maldives)
- Mongolian Republican Party
- Civic Will – Republican Party, in Mongolia
- Republican Turkish Party, in Northern Cyprus
- Republican Party (Pakistan)
- Republican Party (Philippines)
- Minkuotang, in Taiwan
- Republican Party (Timor-Leste)

== Europe ==
=== France ===
- Republican, Radical and Radical-Socialist Party
- Independent Republicans
- Republican Party (France)
- Rally for the Republic
- Democratic Republican Alliance
- The Republicans (France)

=== Iceland ===
- Republican Party (Iceland, 1953)
- Republican Party (Iceland, 2013)

=== Ireland ===
- Fianna Fáil, full name Fianna Fáil – The Republican Party, in Ireland
- Republican Sinn Féin
- Sinn Féin

=== Italy ===
- European Republicans Movement
- Italian Republican Party
- The Republicans (Italy)

=== Other Republican Parties in Europe ===
- Republican Party of Albania
- Republican Party of Armenia
- Republican Party (Bosnia and Herzegovina)
- Republic of Bulgaria (Bulgaria)
- Republican Party of Farmers and Peasants (Czechoslovakia)
- Rally for the Republic – Republican Party of Czechoslovakia (Czechoslovakia, now Czech Republic)
- Republican Party (Estonia)
- Republic (Faroe Islands)
- Republican Party of Georgia
- The Republicans (Germany)
- Republican Party (Hungary)
- Republican Party of Moldova
- The Republicans (Poland)
- Portuguese Republican Party
- Republican Party (Spain, 1913)
- Republican Party (Romania)
- Republican Party (Turkey)
- Republican Party of the Russian Federation
- Yugoslav Republican Party
- Maltese National Republican Alliance

== Oceania ==
- Republican Party of Australia
- Republican Party of Guam
- New Zealand Republican Party (1967)
- New Zealand Republican Party (1995)
- Republican Party (Northern Mariana Islands)
- Vanuatu Republican Party

== See also ==
- Republican (disambiguation)
- Republican People's Party (disambiguation)
- People's Republican Party (disambiguation)
- Republicanism, an ideology of being a citizen in a state as a republic under which the people hold popular sovereignty
- Republican Alternative Party (disambiguation)
- Republican Liberal Party (disambiguation)
