= List of awards and nominations received by Xiao Zhan =

Chinese actor and singer (born 1991)

Xiao Zhan awards and nominations
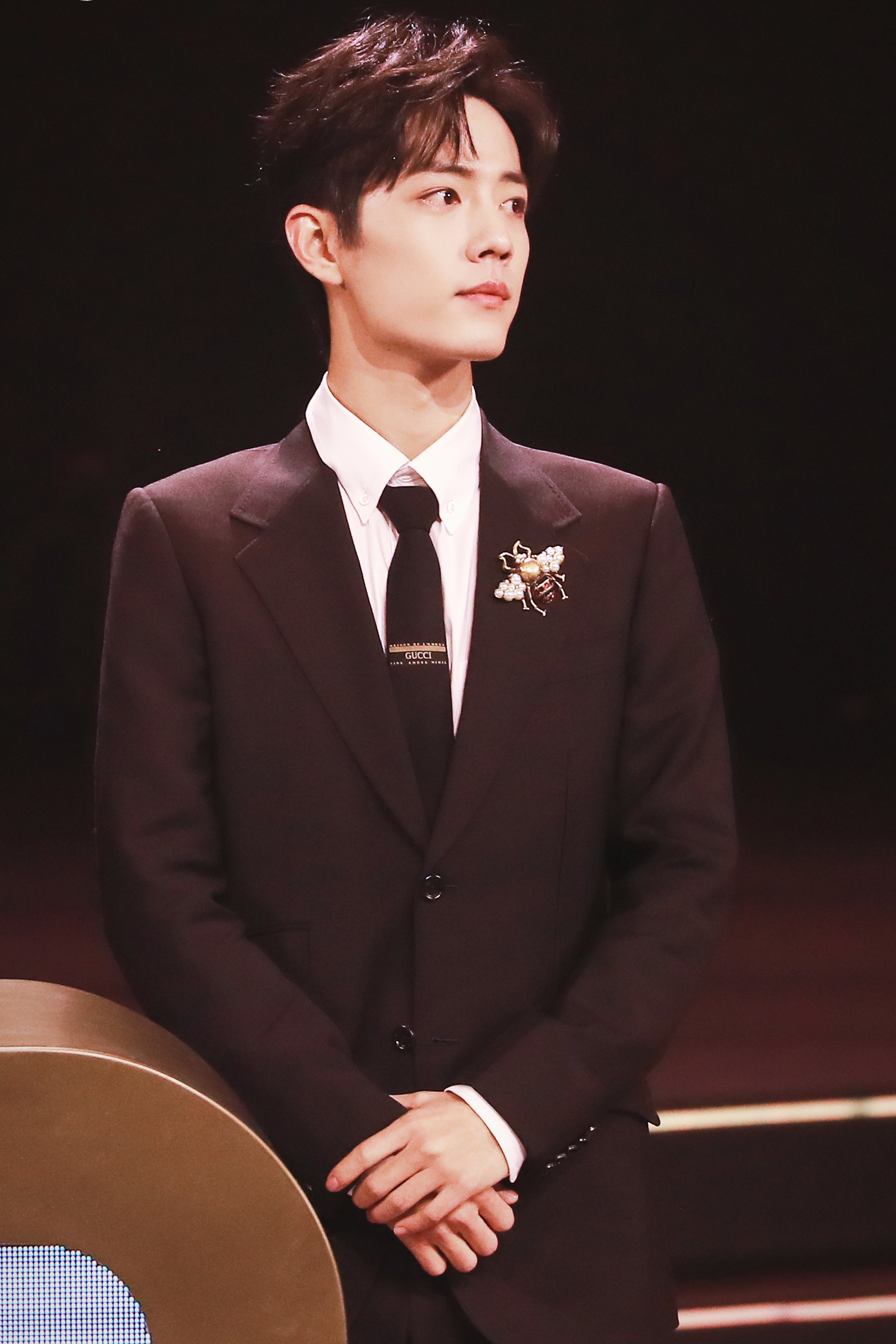
- Xiao in 2020
Awards and nominations
Award	Wins	Nominations
Ammolite Awards	1	1
Beijing Daily Film and Television Awards	4	4
China Literature Awards Ceremony	2	2
China Screen Awards	1	1
China TV Drama Awards	1	1
CMG Awards	1	2
Cultural and Entertainment Industry Congress	0	5
Flying Tiger Awards	1	1
Golden Angel Awards	1	1
Golden Lotus Awards	0	1
Golden Petrel Awards	1	1
Huading Awards	1	1
iQIyI Scream Night	1	1
Magnolia Awards	0	1
Sina Film & TV Awards	1	1
SMG Awards	1	1
Sougou IN Awards	1	1
The Actors of China Awards	1	1
Tencent Entertainment White Paper Annual Ceremony	5	5
Tencent Video All Star Awards	5	6
Wenrong Awards	0	1
Weibo Awards	9	12
Weibo TV and Internet Video Summit Awards	0	9
Weibo TV Series Awards	5	6
WeTV Awards	8	12

Totals (Note: Certain award groups do not simply award one winner. They acknowledge several different recipients, have runners-up, and have third place. Since this is a specific recognition and is different from losing an award, runner-up mentions are considered wins in this award tally. For simplification and to avoid errors, each award in this list has been presumed to have had a prior nomination.)
- Wins: 75
- Nominations: 113

Xiao Zhan is a Chinese actor and singer who has received various accolades throughout his career, including a CMG Award, a SMG Award, a Flying Tiger Award, a Golden Angel Award, and a Huading Award, as well as earning nominations for a Golden Grove Award, a Golden Lotus Awards, and a Magnolia Awards.

For his acting career, his breakthrough role as Wei Wuxian in The Untamed (2019), widely considered a massive cultural phenomenon both in China and internationally, won him two awards, namely, Best Newcomer at the Huading Awards and Best Actor in the Web Series category at the Yinchuan Internet Film Festival. Subsequently, his role as Xiao Chunsheng in The Youth Memories (2023) declared him the winner of the Golden Angel TV Award for Best Actor at the Chinese American TV Festival and Breakthrough Actor of the Year at the CMG Annual Chinese TV Drama Ceremony. In 2026, at age 34, he became the first actor born in the 1990s and the youngest recipient to win Best Actor honors in back-to-back blockbuster hits, both television and film, with The Legend of Zang Hai (2025) and Gezhi Town (2025), which earned him the "Double Emperor" moniker in Chinese entertainment. His performance as Zang Hai also secured a highly coveted nomination for the prestigious Magnolia Awards at the Shanghai Television Festival.

For his music career, the theme song of the 2019 drama The Untamed, sung by him in a duet titled "Unrestrained" (无羁), won Song of the Year at both the Tencent Music Entertainment Awards and the Kugou Music Awards. As a solo artist, without any prior promotion, his digital single "Spotlight" (光点) (released internationally as "Made to Love") achieved major streaming milestones, such as Guinness World Records for the highest-selling digital single of all time and the International Federation of the Phonographic Industry's 7th best-selling single globally in 2020. His first studio album, WM (我们), released in 2024, swept the Album of the Year titles at the Tencent Music Entertainment Awards and the QQ Music Super Peak Night.

Xiao's media and popularity recognition are mapped through his consistent nominations and wins on entertainment awards, such as Beijing Daily Film and Television Awards, Cultural and Entertainment Industry Congress, Weibo Awards, WeTV Awards, and Tencent Entertainment White Paper Annual Ceremony.

== Film and television awards ==
Name of the award ceremony, year presented, category, nominee of the award, and the result of the nomination
Award ceremony	Year	Category	Nominee(s) / Work(s)	Result	Ref.
Asian Art Film Festival – Golden Petrel Awards	2026	Best Actor	Gezhi Town	Won	
Beijing College Student Film Festival – Flying Tiger Awards	2026	Best Actor (Note: He became the first actor born in the 1990s to win major Best Actor honors in both television and film, which led to Chinese media dubbing him the "Double Emperor of Movie and Television.")	Gezhi Town	Won	
China Television Drama Production Industry Association Awards – Golden Grove Award	2026	Best Actor of the Year	The Legend of Zang Hai	Nominated	
China Quality Television Drama Awards	2024	Media Attention Actor of the Year	The Youth Memories	Won	
Chinese American TV Festival – Golden Angel Awards	2024	Outstanding Actor	The Youth Memories	Won	
CMG Annual Chinese TV Drama Ceremony	2024	Breakthrough Actor of the Year	The Youth Memories / Sunshine by My Side	Won	
CMG Annual Chinese TV Drama Ceremony	2026	Actor of the Year	The Legend of Zang Hai	Nominated	
Hengdian Film Festival of China - Wenrong Awards	2019	Best Actor	The Untamed	Nominated	
Huading Awards	2019	Best Newcomer	The Untamed	Won	
Macau International Television Festival - Golden Lotus Awards	2026	Best Actor	The Legend of Zang Hai	Nominated	
New Era International Television Festival - Ammolite Awards	2026	Most Influential Actor of the New Era	The Legend of Zang Hai	Won	
Shanghai Television Festival - Magnolia Awards	2026	Best Actor	The Legend of Zang Hai	Nominated	
SMG TV Series Quality Awards	2026	Outstanding Quality Actor of the Year	The Legend of Zang Hai	Won	
The Actors of China Awards	2019	Best Actor (Web series)	The Untamed	Nominated	
Yinchuan Internet Film Festival	2019	Best Actor (Web series)	The Untamed	Won	

== Music awards ==
Name of the award ceremony, year presented, category, nominee of the award, and the result of the nomination
Award ceremony	Year	Category	Nominee(s) / Work(s)	Result	Ref.
Chinese Top Ten Music Awards	2020	Top Ten Songs	"Unrestrained" (with Wang Yibo)	Won	
Chinese Top Ten Music Awards	2020	Top Ten Songs	"Remaining Years"	Won	
JOOX Thailand Music Awards	2020	Top Social Global Artist of the Year	—N/a	Won	
Kugou Music Awards	2019	Song of the Year	"Unrestrained" (with Wang Yibo)	Won	
QQ Music Super Peak Night	2025	Peak Album of the Year	WM (我们)	Won	
Sina Cultural & Entertainment Awards	2020	Top 10 Music Works	"Spotlight" (光点)	Won	
Tencent Entertainment White Paper Annual Ceremony	2020	Male Singer of the Year	"Spotlight" (光点)	Won	
Tencent Music Entertainment Awards	2019	Song of the Year	"Unrestrained" (with Wang Yibo)	Won	
Tencent Music Entertainment Awards	2020	Popular Digital Single of the Year	"Spotlight" (光点)	Won	
Tencent Music Entertainment Awards	2025	Physical Album of the Year	WM (我们)	Won	
Weibo Music Awards	2024	Recommended Person of the Year	—N/a	Won	
Weibo Music Awards	2024	Recommended Song of the Year	“Fellow Travelers” (同路人)	Won	
Weibo Music Awards	2025	Recommended Person of the Year	—N/a	Won	
Weibo Music Awards	2025	Recommended Song of the Year	Wild (我们)	Won	
Weibo Music Awards	2025	Recommended MV of the Year	Wild (我们)	Won	
Weibo TV and Internet Video Summit Awards	2022	Top 10 Television and Music Soundtrack	"Winter Dream" (冬梦)	Nominated	
Weibo TV and Internet Video Summit Awards	2022	Top 10 Television and Music Soundtrack	"We had been together" (我们曾经在一起) (with Tan Weiwei)	Nominated	
Weibo TV and Internet Video Summit Awards	2022	Top 10 Television and Music Soundtrack	"The Oath of Love" (余生，请多指教) (with Yang Zi)	Nominated	

== Other accolades ==
=== Media and popularity recognition ===
Name of the award ceremony, year presented, category, nominee of the award, and the result of the nomination
Award ceremony	Year	Category	Nominee(s) / Work(s)	Result	Ref.
Baidu Entertainment Hot Point Awards	2019	Hottest Star of the Year	—N/a	Won	
Baidu Entertainment Hot Point Awards	2022	Actor of the Year	—N/a	Won	
Beijing Daily Film and Television Awards	2022	Popular Actor of the Year	Douluo Continent	Won	
Beijing Daily Film and Television Awards	2023	Popular Actor of the Year	The Oath of Love	Won	
Beijing Daily Film and Television Awards	2024	Popular Actor of the Year	The Youth Memories	Won	
Beijing Daily Film and Television Awards	2026	Popular Actor of the Year	The Legend of Zang Hai	Won	
Beijing News Annual Television Ranking Award	2019	Actor of the Year	The Untamed	Nominated	
China Literature Awards Ceremony	2019	Actor of the Year	The Untamed / Jade Dynasty	Won	
China Literature Awards Ceremony	2019	Heartthrob Actor	Jade Dynasty	Won	
China Movie Channel M List	2019	Most Promising Actor	Jade Dynasty	Nominated	
China Screen Awards	2020	New Actor of the Year	Jade Dynasty	Won	
COSMO Beauty Ceremony	2018	Beautiful Idol of the Year	—N/a	Won	
COSMO Glam Night	2019	Person of The Year (Dream)	—N/a	Won	
Cultural and Entertainment Industry Congress	2019	Best Actor (Drama)	The Untamed	Nominated	
Cultural and Entertainment Industry Congress	2019	Breakthrough Actor (Drama)	The Untamed	Nominated	
Cultural and Entertainment Industry Congress	2019	Best Couple (with Wang Yibo)	The Untamed	Nominated	
Cultural and Entertainment Industry Congress	2019	Breakthrough Actor (Film)	Jade Dynasty	Nominated	
Cultural and Entertainment Industry Congress	2025	Best Actor (Drama)	The Legend of Zang Hai	Nominated	
Douyin Star Night	2020	Popularity Star Award	—N/a	Won	
Golden Bud Network Film and Television Festival	2019	Best Actor	The Untamed	Nominated	
Golden Tower Awards	2026	Most Popular Actor	The Legend of Zang Hai	Won	
Hengdian World Studio Classic Ranking	2019	Most Popular Character	The Untamed	Won	
iQIyI Scream Night	2019	Rising Popular Actor	—N/a	Won	
Jinri Toutiao Awards Ceremony	2020	Most Noticed Male Celebrity	—N/a	Won	
Night of the Film	2019	Most Promising Actor	Jade Dynasty	Nominated	
Sina Film & TV Awards	2019	Most Popular Actor of the Year	The Untamed	Won	
Sougou IN Awards	2019	Most Promising Artist	—N/a	Won	
Tencent Entertainment White Paper Annual Ceremony	2019	Television Actor of the Year	—N/a	Won	
Tencent Entertainment White Paper Annual Ceremony	2019	Star Celebrity Board: Television Actor of the Year	—N/a	Won	
Tencent Entertainment White Paper Annual Ceremony	2019	Influence Star of the Year	—N/a	Won	
Tencent Entertainment White Paper Annual Ceremony	2019	Star Celebrity Board: Influential Artist of the Year	—N/a	Won	
Tencent Entertainment White Paper Annual Ceremony	2020	Star Power of the Year	—N/a	Won	
Tencent Video All Star Awards	2016	Best New Actor	Super Star Academy	Nominated	
Tencent Video All Star Awards	2018	Doki Popularity Award	—N/a	Won	
Tencent Video All Star Awards	2019	Doki Popularity King	—N/a	Won	
Tencent Video All Star Awards	2019	VIP Star	—N/a	Won	
Tencent Video All Star Awards	2019	Popular TV Actor of the Year	The Untamed	Won	
Tencent Video All Star Awards	2020	VIP Star	—N/a	Won	
Weibo Night	2019	Hot Figure of the Year	The Untamed	Won	
Weibo Night	2019	Weibo King (Note: He won the highest title at the Weibo Night for three consecutive years. Established by Sina Corporation, the event honors influential figures across entertainment and other domains based on platform metrics and underscores its role as an internet industry benchmark.)	—N/a	Won	
Weibo Night	2020	Weibo King	—N/a	Won	
Weibo Night	2022	Popular Figure of the Year	—N/a	Nominated	
Weibo Night	2022	Weibo King	—N/a	Nominated	
Weibo Night	2022	Weibo Quality Actor of the Year	—N/a	Won	
Weibo Night	2023	Weibo King	—N/a	Nominated	
Weibo Night	2023	Outstanding Actor of the Year	—N/a	Won	
Weibo Night	2023	Netizens’ Favorite Characters	—N/a	Won	
Weibo Night	2025	Most Influential Actor of the Year	—N/a	Won	
Weibo Night	2026	Weibo King	—N/a	Won	
Weibo Night	2026	Weibo Annual Role Model Actor	—N/a	Won	
Weibo TV and Internet Video Summit Awards	2022	Best Artist	—N/a	Nominated	
Weibo TV and Internet Video Summit Awards	2022	Expressive Actor of the Year	—N/a	Won	
Weibo TV and Internet Video Summit Awards	2022	Most Favorite Male Characters	Doulou Continent	Nominated	
Weibo TV and Internet Video Summit Awards	2022	Most Favorite Male Characters	Ace Troops	Nominated	
Weibo TV and Internet Video Summit Awards	2022	Most Favorite Male Characters	The Oath of Love	Nominated	
Weibo TV and Internet Video Summit Awards	2024	Most Popular Actor	—N/a	Nominated	
Weibo TV and Internet Video Summit Awards	2024	Most Popular Roles	The Youth Memories	Nominated	
Weibo TV and Internet Video Summit Awards	2024	Most Popular Roles	The Longest Promise	Nominated	
Weibo TV and Internet Video Summit Awards	2024	Most Popular Roles	Sunshine by My Side	Nominated	
Weibo TV Series Awards	2019	Most Popular Actor	The Untamed	Nominated	
Weibo TV Series Awards	2019	Most Popular Character	The Untamed	Won	
Weibo TV Series Awards	2020	Most Popular Actor	The Wolf	Won	
Weibo TV Series Awards	2021	Most Popular Actor	Douluo Continent	Won	
Weibo TV Series Awards	2022	Romantic Character of the Year	The Oath of Love	Won	
Weibo TV Series Awards	2022	The Fighting Role of the Year	Ace Troops	Won	
WeTV Awards	2020	Best Male Lead	The Untamed	Won	
WeTV Awards	2020	Best Male Actor of the Year	—N/a	Won	
WeTV Awards	2021	Best Actor	Douluo Continent	Won	
WeTV Awards	2021	Favorite Actor	Douluo Continent	Won	
WeTV Awards	2021	Artist of the Year	Douluo Continent / The Untamed	Nominated	
WeTV Awards	2021	Top Actor	—N/a	Nominated	
WeTV Awards	2021	Best Man Crush Monday of The Year	—N/a	Nominated	
WeTV Awards	2022	Best Actor	—N/a	Won	
WeTV Awards	2022	Artist of the Year	—N/a	Nominated	
WeTV Awards	2022	Best Arms Carry (with Yang Zi)	The Oath of Love	Won	
WeTV Awards	2022	Best Couple (with Yang Zi)	The Oath of Love	Won	
WeTV Awards	2022	Best Hero	The Oath of Love	Won	

=== Listicles ===
Name of publisher, year listed, listicle, and placement
Publisher	Year	Listicle	Placement	Ref.
APEC Summit	2025	Asia-Pacific Leaders Under 35 in 2025	Included	
Forbes China	2019	30 Under 30	Included	
Sina Entertainment	2019	The Most Beautiful Performance – Outstanding Actor of the Year	Included	
Sohu Entertainment	2026	China's Most Media-Favorite Artists of 2025	1st	
Thailand Headlines	2019	Person of the Year	Included	
The Beijing News	2020	Entertainment Person of the Year	Included	

=== World records ===
†	Indicates a former held world record

Name of publication, year the record was awarded, name of the record, and the name of the record holder
Publication	Year	World records	Record holder	Ref.
Guinness World Records	2020	Fastest-selling digital track (China)	"Spotlight" (光点)	
Guinness World Records	2023	Biggest-selling digital single	"Spotlight" (光点)	

=== Streaming milestones ===
Name of publication, year awarded, achievement, work(s), and the result
Organizations	Year	Achievement	Work(s)	Result	Ref.
International Federation of the Phonographic Industry	2020	IFPI's Best-selling Global Digital Single of 2020	"Spotlight" (光点)	7th	
QQ Music	2019	10 million certification	"Songs Ends With Chen Qing"	Won	

=== Miscellaneous awards ===
Name of organizations, year presented, category, and the result
Organizations	Year	Category	Result	Ref.
China Celebrity Charity Gala	2019	Philanthropy Award	Won	
The 2021 SportsMoney Awards	2021	Best Sports Endorsement	Won	
