= Xiao Zhan discography =

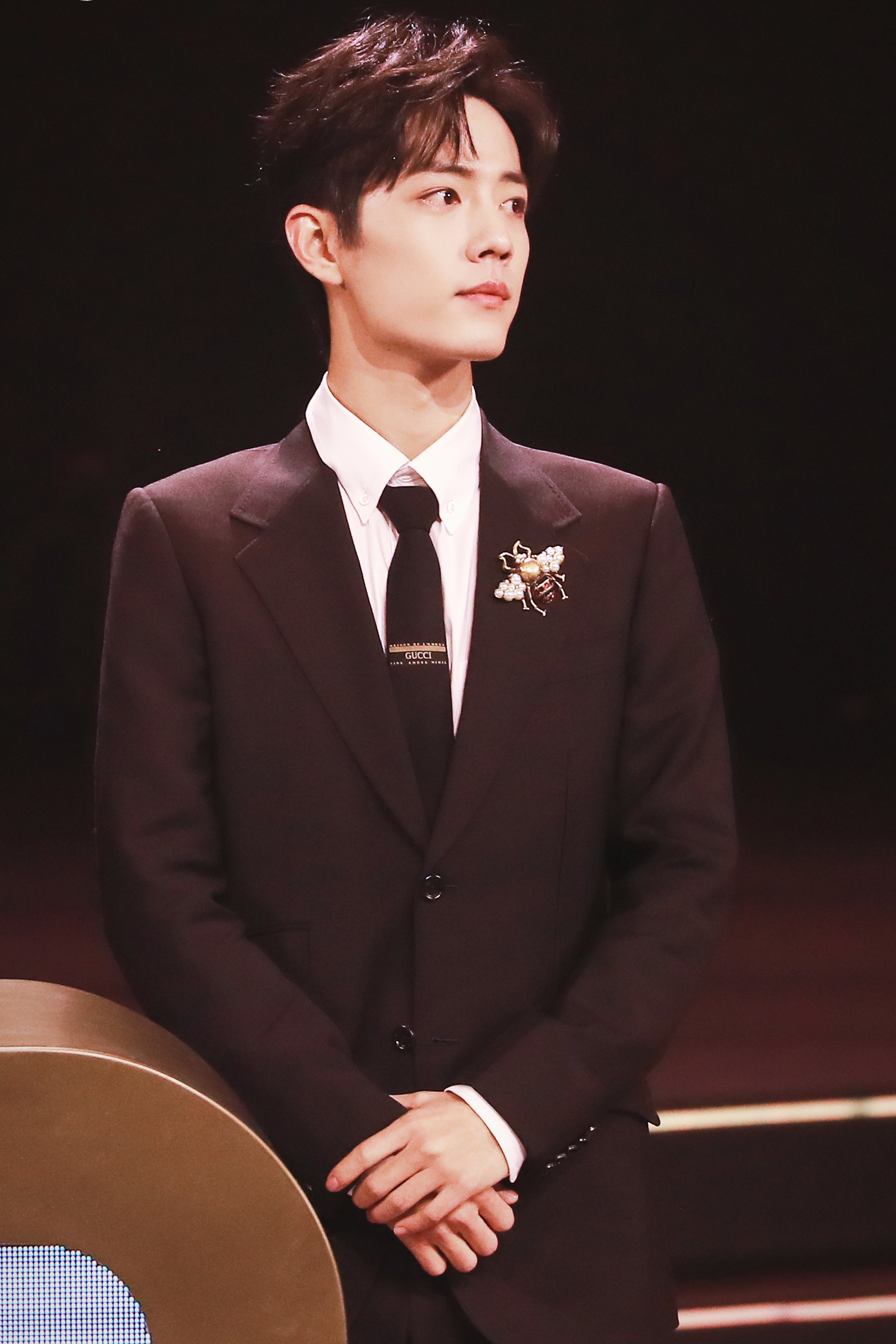
- Xiao in 2020
- Studio albums: 1
- Singles: 17

This is the discography of Chinese recording artist Xiao Zhan. He made his debut as a solo singer with the release of the soundtrack "Stepping on Shadows" for Oh! My Emperor. His 2020 single "Spotlight" is the best-selling selling digital single in China with over 54 million downloads.

"WM" is the first physical music album released by Xiao Zhan on December 11, 2024. It contains 12 songs and Zheng Nan serves as the music director of the entire album. The song was made available for free online listening on November 12, November 19, and November 26, 2024, and the physical vinyl record was available for pre-sale on December 11, 2024, with sales exceeding RMB 50 million within four minutes of its release, it topped the QQ Music physical sales charts (overall, monthly, annual, and all-time) within 14 hours, achieving the highest title of "Hall of Fame Epic Record" and breaking the historical record for the fastest to achieve "Hall of Fame Epic Record". The platform does not display the total sales, but conservative estimates based on different channels suggest at least 300 to 400 million.

The album released globally on March 15, 2025 and was very well-received. The album won "Top Album of the year" during QQ music event. On the first day of its release on iTunes it ranked second in the worldwide chart and third in Europe. 3 MVs are currently topping the TOP3 worldwide chart for the most popular MV on iTunes. At Weibo Music Awards the song "Wild" from the album won "Recommended Song of the Year" and "Recommended MV of the Year". It is the best-selling album of all time on TME Physical Album Sales Chart.

== Studio albums ==
List of studio albums
Title	Album details	Peak chart positions
Title	Album details	CHN TME
WM (我们)	Released: November 10, 2024; Label: Xiao Zhan Studio; Formats: CD, digital download; Track listing: 1. "Intro"; 2. "Wild" (我們); 3. "Anonymous" (都一樣); 4. "Return" (還原); 5. "Glimmering" (熒); 6. "Life of Us" (漂流); 7. "Beacon" (燈塔); 8. "Night Person" (夜行人的自白); 9. "Half-Dream" (歸零); 10. "Go head" (不要回頭); 11. "Bonne Nuit" (晚安); 12. "Outro"; Personnel: Zheng Nan – producer, composer, arranger, lyricist; Xiao Zhan – lyricist, vocals; Zhao Jing – mixing engineer	1

== Singles ==
=== 2010s ===
Title	Year	Peak chart positions	Album	Ref.
Title	Year	CHN TME	Album	Ref.
"Stepping on Shadows" (踩影子)	2018	—	Oh! My Emperor OST	
"Battle Through the Heavens" (斗破苍穹) (with Wu Jiacheng, Peng Chuyue & Gu Jiacheng)	2018	—	Battle Through the Heavens OST	
"Satisfied" (满足)	2018	—	Non-album single	
"Unrestrained" (无羁) (with Wang Yibo)	2019	1	The Untamed OST	
"Unrestrained" (无羁) (solo version)	2019	—	The Untamed OST	
"Song Ends with Chen Qing" (曲尽陈情)	2019	1	The Untamed OST	
"Asking Youth" (问少年)	2019	9	Jade Dynasty OST	
"Two Tigers" (两只老虎)	2019	9	Two Tigers OST	
"Remaining Years" (余年)	2019	4	Joy of Life OST	
"Blue Sea Ambition" (沧海一声笑)	2019	15	New Smiling, Proud Wanderer OST	
"—" denotes releases that did not chart or chart did not exist.				

=== 2020s ===
Title	Year	Peak chart positions			Sales	Album	Ref.
Title	Year	CHN TME	HUN	US World	Sales	Album	Ref.
"Sing in a Thousand Years" (千年一声唱) (with Na Ying)	2020	—	—	—	—N/a	Everlasting Classics Season 3	
"Bamboo Stone" (竹石)	2020	—	—	—	—N/a	Everlasting Classics Season 3	
"Spotlight" (光点)	2020	1	26	5	CHN: 54,337,019	Non-album single	
"The Youth on a Horse" (策马正少年)	2021	4	—	—	—N/a	Douluo Continent OST	
"We had been together" (我们曾经在一起) (with Tan Weiwei)	2021	7	—	—	—N/a	Ace Troops OST	
"The Oath of Love" (余生，请多指教) (with Yang Zi)	2022	17	—	—	—N/a	The Oath of Love OST	
"The Luckiest Fortune" (最幸运的幸运 )	2022	1	—	—	—N/a	The Oath of Love OST	
"—" denotes releases that did not chart or was not released in that region.

== Other appearances ==
Title	Year	Peak chart positions	Album	Note(s)	Ref.
Title	Year	CHN	Album	Note(s)	Ref.
"My Motherland and I" (我和我的祖国)	2019	—	Youth for the Motherland Singing	Project for People's Republic of China's 70th anniversary	
"My Chinese Heart" (我的中国心)	2019	—	Youth for the Motherland Singing	Project for People's Republic of China's 70th anniversary	
"The Best Summer" (最好的夏天)	2019	12	Youth for the Motherland Singing	Project for People's Republic of China's 70th anniversary	
"Firmly Believe Love Will Win" (坚信爱会赢)	2020	10	Non-album singles	COVID-19 pandemic support song	
"Sui Sui Ping An" (岁岁平安)	2020	3	Non-album singles	COVID-19 pandemic support song	
"Ode to the Red Plum Blossoms" (红梅赞)	2020	—	Non-album singles	Beautiful China campaign	
"Bamboo Rock" (竹石)	2020	—	Non-album singles	COVID-19 pandemic support song	
"Brightest Star in the Night Sky" (夜空中最亮的星)	2020	—	Non-album singles	CCTV-3 Double Ninth Festival	
"We Are All Dream Chasers" (我们都是追梦人)	2020	—	Gutian Heart to Heart		
"Winter Dream" (冬梦)	2021	—	2022 Beijing Winter Olympics		
"Chinese Dream, My Dream" (中国梦·我的梦)	2022	—	2022 China Online Audiovisual Annual Festival		
"Fellow Travellers" (同路人)	2023	6	10th Anniversary of the "Belt and Road"		
"—" denotes releases that did not chart.
