= Wanting Qu =

- Born: Qu Wanting; October 10, 1983 (age 43); Harbin, Heilongjiang, China
- Education: Seneca College
- Occupations: Pianist; lyricist; singer; songwriter
- Years active: 2010–present
- Works: Discography
- Partner(s): Gregor Robertson (2015–2017); River Fox (?–present)
- Musical career
- Genres: Soul; pop rock; synthpop; R&B; C-pop
- Instruments: Piano; guitar; keyboard; electric piano; synthesizer
- Labels: Nettwerk; Universal Music China

Chinese name
- Chinese: 曲婉婷
Transcriptions
Standard Mandarin
- Hanyu Pinyin: Qū Wǎntíng

Wanting Qu (Chinese: 曲婉婷; pinyin: Qū Wǎntíng; born October 10, 1983 as Qu Wanting), known mononymously in English as Wanting (/wɑːn'tɪŋ/), is a Chinese pianist and singer-songwriter who is currently based in Vancouver, British Columbia, Canada.

Born and raised in Harbin, China, Wanting moved to Canada aged 16 and is known for her signature song "You Exist In My Song" from her debut album Everything in the World (2012).

Wanting's career has suffered in China after being embroiled in a high-profile controversy following her mother, Zhang Mingjie's detention over embezzlement of 350 million yuan, later changed to bribery, and has been banned in mainland China since 2026.

== Career ==
Wanting Qu was born and raised in Harbin, Heilongjiang, China, where her mother Zhang Mingjie worked as a city official. She moved to Canada at 16 to study, eventually earning a degree in international business, and relocated to Vancouver where she began her musical career.

In 2009, she became the first Chinese artist to be signed to the Nettwerk label; she is managed by Terry McBride. Her first album, Everything in the World (produced by Winston Hauschild and jointly released with Universal Music China in 2012) went platinum in China within its first week on sale, and her singles "You Exist in My Song" and "Drenched" were used in the soundtrack for the Hong Kong film Love in the Buff. The music video for "You Exist in My Song" is one of seven Chinese music videos to reach 200 millions on YouTube.

In 2013, she became the first ever tourism ambassador for Vancouver, with the intention of raising Canada's profile among destinations for Chinese visitors.

Wanting appeared on the 2013 CCTV New Year's Gala, where she performed "You Exist in My Song".

The song "Star in You" from the album Everything in the World was featured in Degrassi: The Next Generation in the episode "Bitter Sweet Symphony, Part II" on February 22, 2013.

On October 26, 2015, while making the third album; Wanting released her new English single "Love Birds" on her YouTube channel.

On February 23, 2026, it was rumoured that Wanting had allegedly created a real-name verified Douyin account, promoting her new album Love Letter where Wanting wore a red hoodie with the word "China" on it. The account had the tag of an "Original Musician" and was banned within 48 hours after creation on February 22. The album was released on July 3 under her own imprint, Wanting Music Inc.

== Personal life ==
It was reported in January 2015 that Wanting and Vancouver mayor Gregor Robertson were dating, and they publicly confirmed that they were in a relationship in February 2015. The relationship drew criticism from some as Robertson was still married to Amy Robertson (although the two had separated). They broke up in May 2017.

On July 18, 2026, Wanting revealed on her Instagram that at 36 years old, she was diagnosed with breast cancer on April 2020 in her left breast. She later underwent mastectomy and has been cancer-free ever since. Wanting also stated that she has a new boyfriend, River Fox.

=== Zhang Mingjie's arrest ===
On April 24, 2015, Wanting's mother Zhang Mingjie was arrested in China due to severe corruption, embezzlement (of roughly $350 million CNY or $55 million USD) and abuse of power, claiming that she had participated in the "sale of state properties below market value for personal profit". Wanting's mother had previously been relieved from her duties related to the city's urban construction and renewal activities in the fall of 2014. Wanting did not publicly comment on the matter, but uploaded an "enigmatic" photo to her Weibo account urging "patience". She later posted a message on Instagram saying "I want nothing but love, health and happiness for her. She's my mother. I'm her only child. No one can replace her in my heart. Despite our differences, we share the same blood." Both Nettwerk and Robertson's office declined to comment, with Robertson's director of communications saying "That's not something that this office would be commenting on". In 2016, it was reported that Zhang was facing the death penalty in China.

On March 9, 2018, Wanting gave an update on her mother's case, saying that she believed Chinese law was "perfect and righteous" and that she had faith there would be a positive outcome. She added that no judgment had been issued since the trial's end in 2016. Wanting's comments regarding her mother being "her hero" have caused controversy in China, with some accusing Wanting of overlooking the seriousness of the case and refusing to believe her mother could be guilty. On 18 November 2021, Zhang was sentenced to life imprisonment after the courts of China found her guilty of bribery and abuse of power.

On April 14, 2023, Sina Finance had reported that two apartments located in Daoli District, Harbin registered under Wanting's name were liquidated in relation to Zhang's detention.

== Discography ==
- Everything in the World (2012)
- Say the Words (2013)
- LLL (2017)
- Love Letter (2026)

== Awards ==
=== Global Chinese music awards ===
Wanting has won three Global Chinese Music Awards.

Year	Nominee / work	Award	Result
2012	Wanting Qu	Best Newcomer	Won
2012	Wanting Qu	Outstanding Regional Artist Award (Beijing)	Won
2012	"You Exist in My Song"	Best Song	Won

=== Chinese music awards ===
Wanting has won four Chinese Music Awards.

Year	Nominee / work	Award	Result
2012	Wanting Qu	Best New Artist	Won
2012	Wanting Qu	Best New Original Artist	Won
2012	Wanting Qu	Best Music Composer	Won
2012	"You Exist in My Song"	Best Song	Won

=== Music Times Awards ===
Wanting has won one Music Times Award.

Year	Nominee / work	Award	Result
2012	Everything in the World	Best Album of the Year	Won
