= List of best-selling singles =

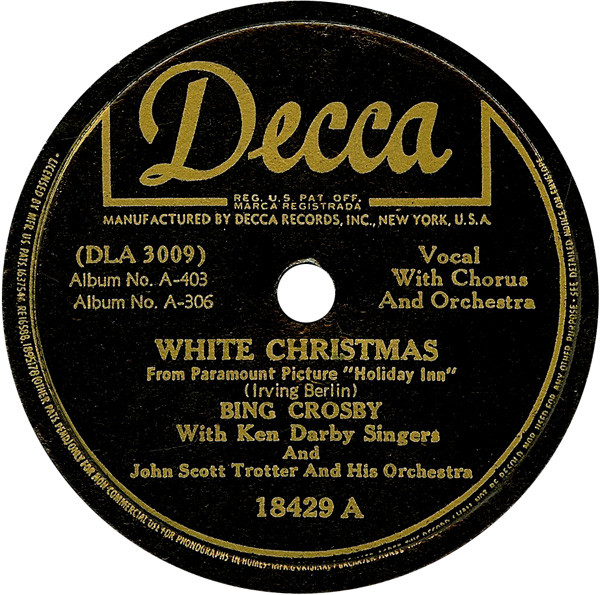
1942 10-inch 78 rpm release of the single "White Christmas" by Bing Crosby

This is a compendium of the best-selling music singles, based on claimed sales by various sources, certified units by certifying authorities worldwide, as well as year-end singles charts by the International Federation of the Phonographic Industry (IFPI).

A precise list of best-selling singles is hard to determine, as no organization has consistently tracked global music sales throughout history. Although the IFPI has published year-end global singles charts since 2007, it has never provided comprehensive all-time worldwide sales figures for singles. It is also difficult to compare the commercial performance of singles from different eras, due to shifts of music consumption over time. From the late 19th century to the early 2000s, physical singles were the major metric to measure a song's success. Digital downloads became the most dominant format between the mid-2000s and the mid-2010s, before being overtaken by music streaming.

According to the IFPI, a digital track purchase is roughly equal to 0.3 of a physical single. (Note: 1 album sold equals 3 physical singles or 10 track downloads.) During the physical era, it was uncommon for singles to achieve Multi-Platinum certification compared to the digital era. During the first 55 years of RIAA certification (1958–2013), Elton John's "Something About the Way You Look Tonight"/"Candle in the Wind 1997" was the only single to receive Diamond certification for physical release. After the inclusion of streaming for RIAA certifications in 2013, three digital singles were immediately certified Diamond that year. By October 2019, a total of 33 singles had been certified Diamond by the RIAA.

According to Guinness World Records, Bing Crosby's "White Christmas" (1942) is the best-selling single worldwide, with estimated sales of over 50 million copies. The song's success was before the existence of certification systems, hence the accuracy is often disputed. Guinness World Records also states that "Candle in the Wind 1997" is "the biggest-selling single since UK and US singles charts began in the 1950s, having accumulated worldwide sales of 33 million copies". In 2023, Guinness World Records declared "Spotlight" by Chinese singer Xiao Zhan as the best-selling digital single of all time, with 54.3 million downloads. In 2025, Guinness World Records declared that Whitney Houston's "I Will Always Love You" was the best-selling single worldwide by a female artist, with over 24 million copies sold. According to official certifications worldwide, Ed Sheeran's "Shape of You" is the highest-certified single ever.

== By claimed sales ==
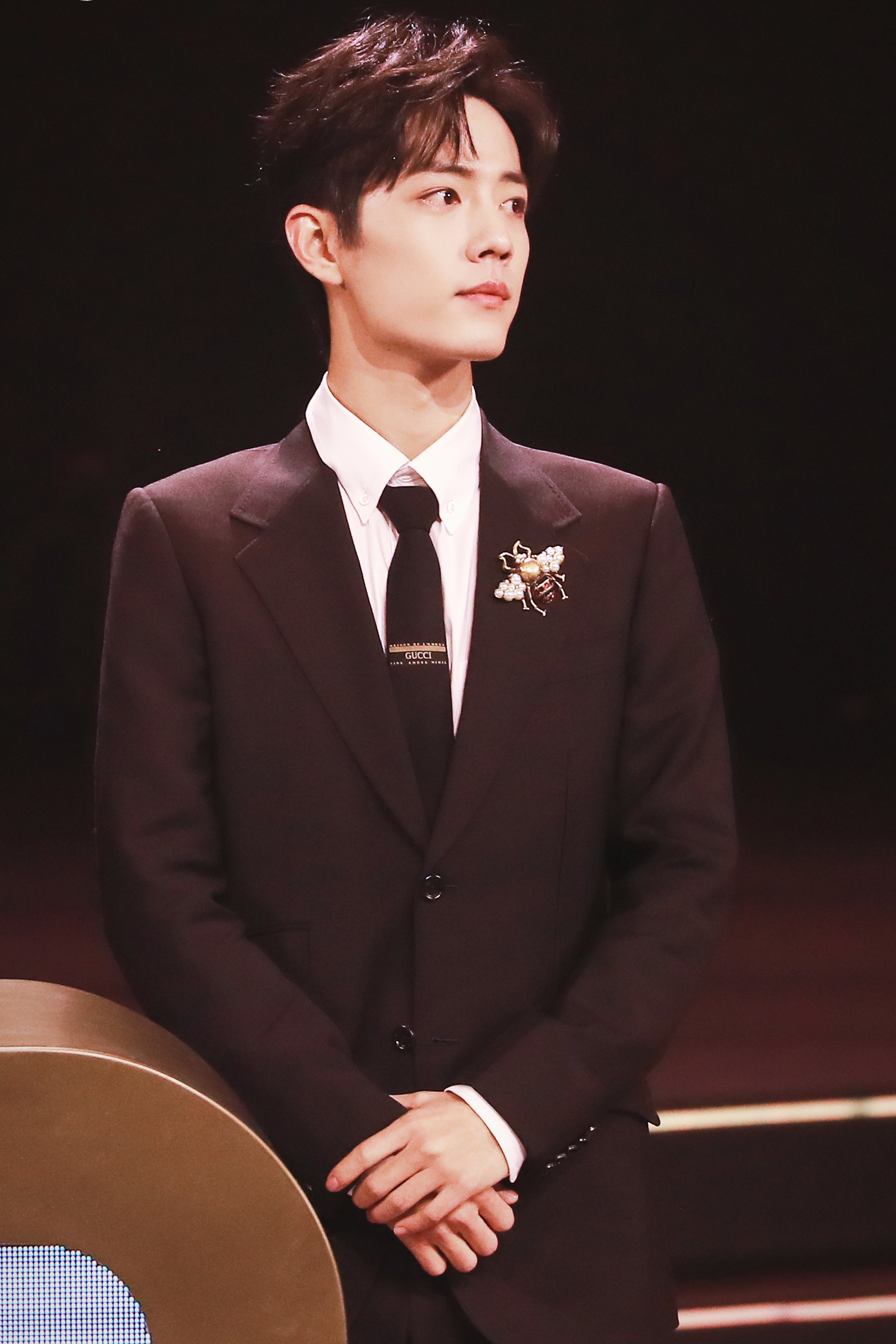
Xiao Zhan's "Spotlight" was reported as the best-selling digital single of all time.

The following is a list of singles that have sold at least 20 million copies (pure sales) according to various sources. Since no official organization provides global record sales, reported figures are often exaggerations. Therefore, this list is ordered by the release year of singles instead of their claimed sales figures.

Top singles with claimed pure sales of at least 20 million according to various sources
Year	Single	Artist	Claimed sales (in million)	Ref.
1935	"Silent Night"	Bing Crosby	30	
1942	"White Christmas"	Bing Crosby	50	
1946	"Petit Papa Noël"	Tino Rossi	30	
1954	"Rock Around the Clock"	Bill Haley & His Comets	25	
1960	"It's Now or Never"	Elvis Presley	20	
1985	"We Are the World"	USA for Africa	20	
1992	"I Will Always Love You"	Whitney Houston	24	
1997	"Something About the Way You Look Tonight"/"Candle in the Wind 1997"	Elton John	33	
2010	"Rolling in the Deep"	Adele	20.6	
2020	"Spotlight"	Xiao Zhan	54.3	

== By year ==
Kesha's "Tik Tok" is the first single to sell over 10 million digital copies in a year according to the IFPI.

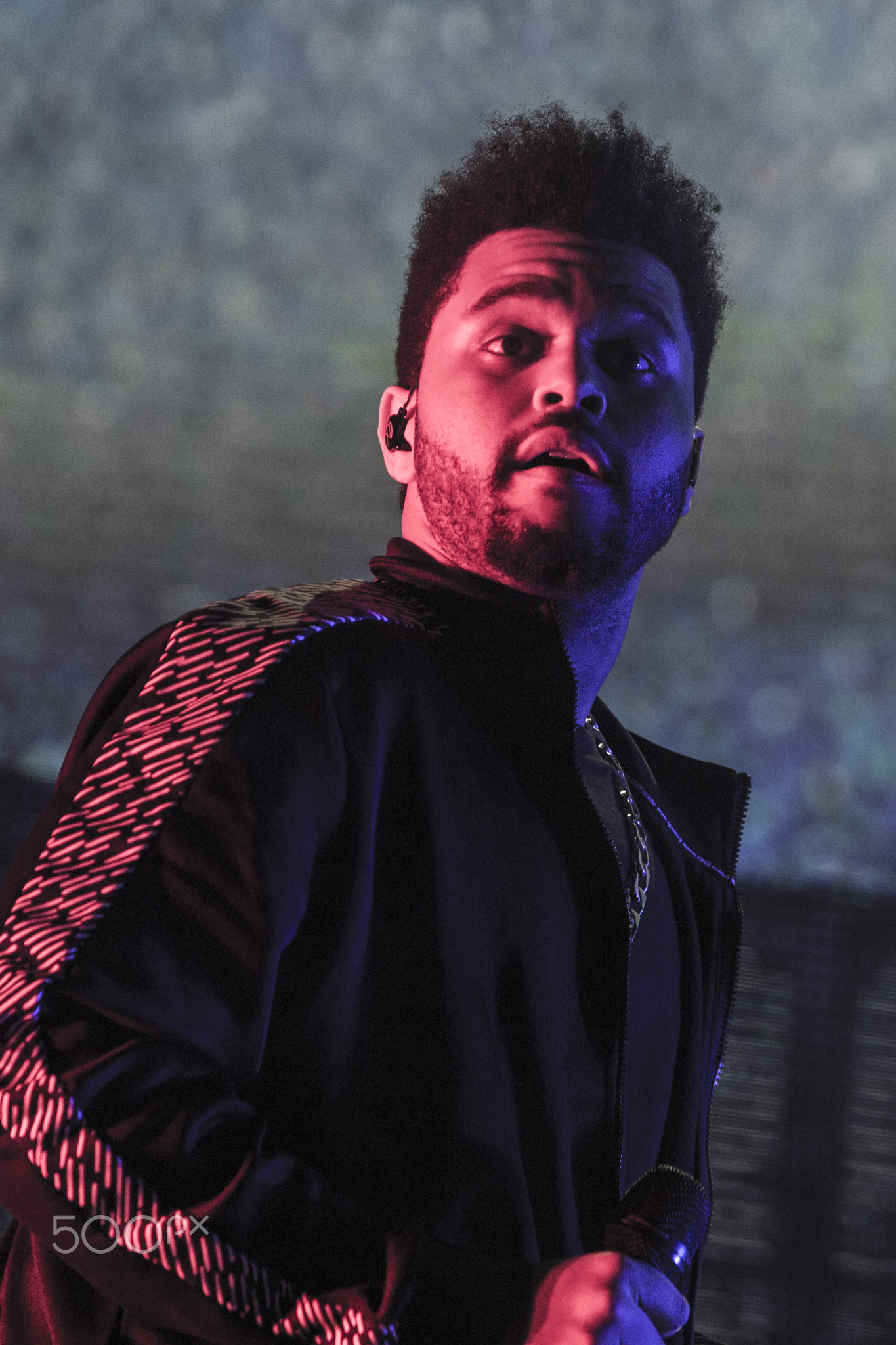
The Weeknd is the first artist to top the IFPI's year-end global single chart twice, with "Blinding Lights" in 2020 and "Save Your Tears" in 2021.

Best-selling singles of the year reported by various sources (non-IFPI)
Year	Single	Artist	Ref.
1966	"The Ballad of the Green Berets"	Barry Sadler	
1968	"Hey Jude"	The Beatles	
1969	"Sugar, Sugar"	The Archies	
1990	"Vogue"	Madonna	
1996	"Killing Me Softly"	Fugees	
1998	"My Heart Will Go On"	Celine Dion	

IFPI's top singles of the year based on pure digital sales
Year	Single	Artist	Sales (in million)	Ref.
2007	"Girlfriend"	Avril Lavigne	7.3	
2008	"Lollipop"	Lil Wayne featuring Static Major	9.1	
2009	"Poker Face"	Lady Gaga	9.8	
2010	"Tik Tok"	Kesha	12.8	
2011	"Just the Way You Are"	Bruno Mars	12.5	
2012	"Call Me Maybe"	Carly Rae Jepsen	12.5	

IFPI's top singles of the year based on track-equivalent units
Year	Single	Artist	Units (in million)	Ref.
2013	"Blurred Lines"	Robin Thicke featuring T.I. and Pharrell	14.8	
2014	"Happy"	Pharrell Williams	13.9	
2015	"See You Again"	Wiz Khalifa featuring Charlie Puth	20.9	
2016	"One Dance"	Drake featuring Wizkid and Kyla	12.5	
2017	"Shape of You"	Ed Sheeran	26.6	
2018	"Havana"	Camila Cabello featuring Young Thug	19	
2019	"Bad Guy"	Billie Eilish	19.5	

IFPI's top singles of the year based on subscription-stream equivalents
Year	Single	Artist	Streams (in billion)	Ref.
2020	"Blinding Lights"	The Weeknd	2.72	
2021	"Save Your Tears"	The Weeknd	2.15	
2022	"As It Was"	Harry Styles	2.28	
2023	"Flowers"	Miley Cyrus	2.70	
2024	"Beautiful Things"	Benson Boone	2.11	
2025	"APT."	Rosé and Bruno Mars	2.06	

== See also ==
- Hit song
- IFPI Global Recording Artist of the Year
- List of best-selling singles by country
- List of best-selling Latin singles
