= SAPPRFT's Opinions On Strengthening The Programme Management of Satellite Television Channels =

2011 Chinese government directive

Opinions On Strengthening The Programme Management of Satellite Television Channels (Chinese: 关于进一步加强电视上星综合频道节目管理的意见) is a government directive ordered by the State Administration of Press, Publication, Radio, Film and Television (SAPPRFT) of China in 2011, aiming at stopping the over-emphasis on purely entertainment programmes in the satellite television channels in China.

== Directive ==
The policy was announced in 2011 and imposed in 2012. The targets of the policy are only those satellite TV channels, not including CCTV and non-satellite provincial TV channels. SAPPRFT focused on the following seven genres of programmes:

- Dating game show
- Talent show
- Variety show about love stories
- Game show
- General variety show
- Talk show
- Reality television

SAPPRFT required that there should not be more than nine programmes of the above genres from 19:30 to 22:00 every day in all satellite TV channels as a whole, and each channel should not broadcast more than 2 programmes of the above genres every week and not more than 90 minutes every day.

SAPPRFT also demanded the satellite TV channels increase the proportion of documentary programmes, news programmes, educational programmes, programmes for children and youth, and also programmes about economic issues and science.

SAPPRFT also impose a policy requiring the TV channels to limit the participation of actors coming from Taiwan and Hong Kong.

== Effects ==
The policy had a great impact on those TV channels that had been focusing on producing entertainment programmes, among which included Hunan Television, Dragon Television, Jiangsu Television, Zhejiang Television, and Shenzhen Satellite TV (深圳卫视). Some of the programmes that had been planned needed to be suspended.
