= Wanting Qu discography =

- Studio albums: 3
- EPs: 2
- Reissues: 1

The discography of Chinese singer-songwriter Wanting Qu consists of three studio albums and two extended plays. Her debut studio album Everything in the World (2012) was certified platinum in both China and Hong Kong, and gold in Malaysia.

== Albums ==
=== Studio albums ===
List of studio albums, showing selected details, sales, and certifications
Title	Album details	Peak chart positions		Sales	Certifications
Title	Album details	CHN	HK	Sales	Certifications
Everything in the World	Released: April 24, 2012; Label: Nettwerk Music; Format: CD, digital download, streaming	1	1	CHN: 120,000; MLY: 10,000	CHN: 6× Platinum; HKRIA: Platinum; RIM: Gold
Say the Words	Released: October 18, 2013; Label: Nettwerk Music; Format: CD, digital download, streaming	2	1		
LLL	Released: October 27, 2017; Label: Nettwerk Music; Format: CD, digital download, streaming	—	—		

=== Reissues ===
List of reissue albums
Title	Album details
Everything in the World (Deluxe Version)	Released: November 14, 2012; Label: Nettwerk Music; Format: CD, digital download, streaming

== Extended plays ==
List of extended plays, showing selected details
Title	Details
Love I Am	Released: April 25, 2009; Label: Nettwerk Music; Format: CD, digital download
Drenched	Released: April 24, 2012; Label: Nettwerk Music; Format: Digital download

== Singles ==
=== As lead artist ===
List of singles
Title	Year	Album
"What Should I Do" (如何是好)	2011	Non-album single
"Life is Like a Song"	2012	Everything in the World
"Drenched"	2012	Everything in the World
"You Exist in My Song" (我的歌声里)	2012	Everything in the World
"Love Ocean" (爱的海洋)	2013	Say the Words
"We Under the Sunshine" (阳光下的我们)	2013	Say the Words
"When It's Lonely" (我为你歌唱)	2013	Say the Words
"The Courage to Love" (爱的勇气)	2014	Non-album singles
"Love Birds"	2015	Non-album singles
"Best Plan" (最好的安排)	2016	Non-album singles
"Your Girl"	2016	Non-album singles
"On the Edge"	2016	Non-album singles
"Moon and Back (JordanXL Remix)"	2017	Non-album singles
"Kissing Paradise"	2017	LLL
"You Can't Hurt Me Anymore (Napa Cabbage Remix)"	2018	Non-album singles
"Mute" (哑巴)	2021	Non-album singles

=== Other appearances ===
Title	Year	Album
Sirens	2012	Time Will Tell
One Day	2015	How
One Day(Chinese Version)	2015	How
"There's One Type of Certainty in Life" (生命有一種絕對)	2015	Her Story With Mayday
Sans toi (Version mandarin)	2016	Une place pour moi
On the Edge	2016	On the Edge
Sans toi (Version mandarin)	2017	Ça ira
Something About You	2017	Fire on the Beach
