= Xiao Zhan incident =

2020 online controversy

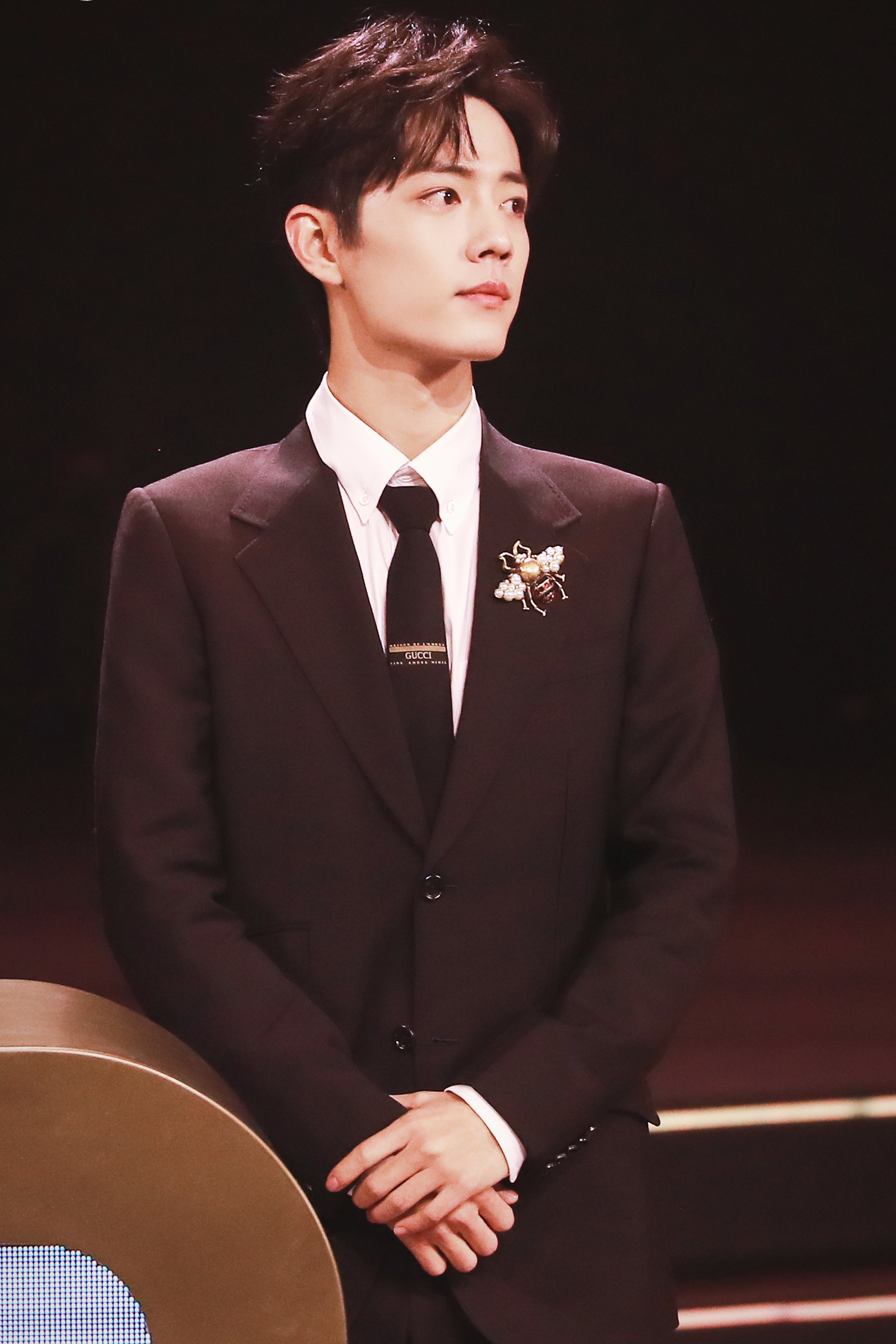
Chinese actor and singer Xiao Zhan

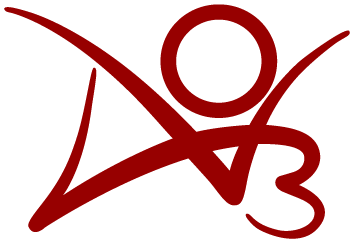
Archive of Our Own

The Xiao Zhan incident, also known as the 227 incident, is a 2020 online controversy that originated between the fans of Chinese actor Xiao Zhan and Archive of Our Own users in mainland China. The incident started when the internet censorship system known as the Great Firewall of China blocked the fan fiction publishing platform Archive of Our Own in the country, due to concerns about the actor's fanbase regarding vulgar and explicit content on the website.

== Background ==
On January 30, 2020, a user named "Didi Escape Stories" (迪迪出逃记, Dídí Chūtáojì) from the fan fiction site Archive of Our Own (AO3) began serializing a novel titled Falling (《下坠》, Xiàzhuì), which focuses on Xiao Zhan and his fellow Chinese actor Wang Yibo. The two idol-actors initially starred as the leads in the popular TV series The Untamed (2019), which is based on the boys' love novel Mo Dao Zu Shi. The erotic story reimagined Xiao as a transgender prostitute and Wang as a high school student.

On February 24, links to chapters 12 and 13 of the novel Falling were posted by the author on the Chinese social networking site Weibo. On February 26, 2020, some of Xiao's fans noted that the work contained explicit pornographic content and the feminization of Xiao, illustrated by the two artists "Brother Tidal Bore" (一只汐哥哥, Yīzhǐxī Gēgē) and "Persistent White" (一个执白, Yīgè Zhíbái). Many fans took it as an insult to the actor, denouncing it on Weibo. The author of Falling and the graphic artists were the main targets of criticism. Two users, "Wanna Get Some Sweet Congee?" (来碗甜粥吗, Láiwǎn Tiánzhōu Ma) and "Little Rabbit Zanbi from Banan District" (巴南区小兔赞比, Bānánqū Xiǎotù Zànbǐ), the "opinion leaders" among Xiao Zhan's fanbase, are recognized as the leaders of the reporting incident against the author and the graphic artists. In a Weibo post on February 26, the latter said that "actors and their fans" do not need to "accept vulgar underage prostitution literature based on artists" and "such behavior not only infringes on the artist's reputation, but also pollutes the online environment and brings down a large number of underaged fans who lack judgement".. From February 27, some fans circulated guides on how to effectively report the material. On February 29, 2020, Archive of Our Own was officially blocked in mainland China due to the country's policy and regulations, according to Cyberspace Administration of China. The next day, AO3 users and some other related groups who believed that the AO3 were blocked due to Xiao fans reports, showed their anger and disappointment by cyber-attacking Xiao, his general fans and even brands that Xiao endorses. The group formed a Weibo supertopic group titled "227 (February 27) Memorial Day", referring to the reporting day which was on February 27, 2020.

On April 23, 2020, Xiao Zhan Studio, through a commissioned law firm, issued a legal statement against certain internet users for "spreading malicious intent and defamatory sexual insults" toward Xiao. The studio declared that rights-protection actions were now being comprehensively carried out.

In August 2025, according to Tianyancha's legal information, the Beijing Internet Court served people surnamed Guo and Luo with a civil judgment in a case involving online infringement liability disputes between Xiao, Luo, and Guo. According to the People's Court Announcement Network, the two surnames were subsequently linked to Lou Chenjing and Guo Yuwei, the hosts or moderators of the "227" Weibo supertopic and the leading figures in the 227 incident. The court ruled that the defendants jointly operated an account to spread false information and incite cyberbullying surrounding Xiao and were required to publish an apology statement on their Sina Weibo account for 48 consecutive hours publicly apologizing to the plaintiff and compensating Xiao a total of 11,000 yuan, along with other issues not publicly released. Six years of legal action ultimately showed that the 227 incident was not simply a fanbase dispute but involved a well-organized smear campaigns.

== History ==
=== 227 Incident ===
The banning of Archive of Our Own in mainland China caused controversy among its users. Their criticisms were further amplified by controversial behaviors of some of Xiao's fans, and claimed that the actor should take responsibility for his fans' actions. A section of the site's users called for a protest on Xiao's brand deals and endorsed products, flooding the brand's pages with negative comments. They formed a Weibo supertopic group titled "227 (February 27) Memorial Day", referring to the incidents that occurred regarding the reporting of Xiao's fans in February 27. This led to increasing cyber attacks towards Xiao Zhan, his fans, and even bystanders. This includes Chinese variety show host He Jiong, who was attacked by the group following a rumor that Xiao would be making an appearance on his show. Some accounts that led online attacks and harassment against the actor were labelled as paid, "professional" anti-fans. In August 2025, according to Tianyancha's legal information, the Beijing Internet Court recently published reports involving online infringement liability disputes between Xiao, "Luo" and "Guo" who were the hosts of the Weibo "227" super topic and the leading figures in the 227 incident. The court ruled that the defendants, "Lou" and "Guo" , must publish an apology statement on their Sina Weibo account for 48 consecutive hours, publicly apologizing to the plaintiff, Xiao, and compensating Xiao a total of 11,000 yuan, among other things that not published.

=== Apology from Xiao Zhan Studio ===
On March 1, 2020, Xiao Zhan's management "Xiao Zhan Studio" issued an apology on Weibo for taking up public resources during the COVID-19 period and for causing troubles to the public.

=== Boycott against Xiao-endorsed brands ===
On March 17, 2020, many Chinese users of Archive of Our Own announced their boycott against the brands that Xiao endorses. These include international luxury brands Estée Lauder, Piaget, and Cartier.

=== Xiao's first interview after the incident ===
On May 6, 2020, Xiao was interviewed by Economic View regarding the incident. He was, at the time, also faced with harassment from internet users for controversial remarks made on Weibo during his college years. Xiao apologized for his old posts and expressed his confusion toward the incidents starting from February 27, 2020. He disagreed, however, with the view that idols need to be responsible for fan's behaviors as he noted idols and fans should be equal, and idols are not superiors to fans. He also said he would guide fans "by being a positive role model, and that he hoped they would live their lives well and won't do anything extreme that would hurt others or themselves."

=== Policy response ===
This conflict among online fan communities resulted in public attention and scrutiny from policymakers. Beginning in June 2021, the Cyberspace Administration of China initiated a series of policies and campaigns against "resentment and abuse, upvoting/downvoting and trolling, disinformation and name-calling, doxing, and privacy violations of online fandom communities." Major Chinese social media platforms revised their policies accordingly. In August 2025, the progress of the lawsuit between Xiao and two of "227" super topic hosts and leader figures in 227 Incident finally published by Beijing Court Report, Beijing Court found Lou and Guo guilty and required an apology statement be published on their Sina Weibo account for 48 consecutive hours, publicly apologizing to Xiao and compensating him 11,000 yuan, along with other requirements that were not publicly announced while other cases were still in process.

== See also ==
- Boycott
- Cyberbullying
- "Spotlight" (Xiao Zhan song)
