= Tencent Music Entertainment =

Chinese music distribution company

Tencent Music Entertainment Group
- Formerly: China Music Corporation
- Type: Public
- Traded as: NYSE: TME (ADS); SEHK: 1698
- ISIN: US88034P1093
- Predecessor: China Music Corporation; Tencent's QQ Music division
- Founded: July 2016; 10 years ago
- Headquarters: Shenzhen, Guangdong, China
- Products: QQ Music, Kugou, Kuwo, WeSing, Ultimate Music
- Revenue: ▲CN¥31.24 billion (2021)
- Owners: Tencent (57% with 61.6% Shareholders Voting Right) Pacific Alliance Group (9.1% with 11% Shareholders Voting Right) Spotify (16.47%) CICFH entities (6.1% and 7.4% Shareholders Voting Right) Zhenyu Xie (4% and 4.9% Shareholders Voting Right) Dhanin Chearavanont (4% and 4.7% Shareholders Voting Right)
- Number of employees: 5,966 (December 2021)
- Parent: Tencent Interactive Entertainment Group
- Website: tencentmusic.com

Tencent Music Entertainment Group (TME; Chinese: 腾讯音乐娱乐集团) is a company that develops music streaming services for the Chinese market. Tencent Music Entertainment's apps include QQ Music, KuGou, Kuwo, and WeSing, which have more than 800 million active users and 120 million paying subscribers. As of July 2016, Tencent Music Entertainment's three services held an estimated 56% market share of music streaming services in China.

In the first quarter of 2021, Tencent Music Entertainment announced it had 60.9 million paying users, up 42.6% compared to the 42.7 million paying users in the first quarter of 2020. In addition, the total number of music streaming users was announced to be 615 million, a drop of 6.4% compared to the first quarter of 2020 (657 million).

== History ==
Tencent Music Entertainment was established in July 2016 with Tencent's purchase of China Music Corporation to strengthen its music offerings. On July 4, 2018, Sony/ATV Music Publishing acquired an equity stake in Tencent Music Entertainment. In October 2018, the firm filed for IPOs of around $2 billion in the United States.

In December 2018, the company announced an IPO with the total value of shares around $1.23 billion, which includes 82 million ADS and 164 million regular shares priced around $13 - $15.

On January 30, 2019, SM Entertainment, the largest entertainment agency of South Korea entered into strategic partnership agreement with China's Tencent Music Entertainment that included music distribution and marketing in the Chinese market.

In June 2020, the Government of India banned QQ Music with 58 other Chinese origin apps citing data and privacy issues. The border tensions in 2020 between India and China might have also played a role in the ban.

As of 2023, 16.47% of Tencent Music Entertainment class A ordinary shares are owned by Spotify.

On May 27, 2025, Hybe Corporation announced it would sell all of its shares in SM Entertainment to the company.

On June 10, 2025, it was announced Tencent Music Entertainment would buy Ximalaya.

== Charts ==
Tencent Music Entertainment currently has four charts: The TME UNI Chart, launched in 2018; the TME Wave Chart, launched in 2020; the TME Korean Chart, launched in 2024; and the TME Physical Album Sales Chart, launched in 2021.

Tencent Music Entertainment began releasing the first "Chinese Digital Music Annual Report" in 2019 and continues to do so every year. The annual report includes rankings of top songs, albums, and artists from all three charts and an overall Chinese Digital Music ranking based on the comprehensive results from TME UNI Chart and TME Wave Chart.

=== TME UNI Chart ===
The name, UNI, is a homophone for "up to you" (由你) in Chinese as this chart is determined by the listeners. The TME UNI Chart contains two lists: Real-time List and Past List. Real-time List shows the top 200 songs and updates every ten minutes. Past List shows the top 100 songs from each charting week, which runs from Monday to Sunday. In 2023, Tencent Music Entertainment Group announced a partnership with Billboard to integrate the TME UNI Chart into Billboard's official Hits of the World collection of global record charts.

Eligible songs must be new songs within six weeks of their initial release on Tencent Music Entertainment's platform and are not part of the following song types:

- Songs without clear ownership and/or credit to the songwriters
- Cover songs without any adaptations
- User-generated, demo, trial, and/or incomplete version of songs
- Live versions of songs performed during commercial performances, concerts, or television programs
- Instrumental and/or background music
- Songs with vulgar lyrics and/or content that do not comply with relevant national regulations
- Songs released more than three months ago that are later added to Tencent Music Entertainment's platform

Songs are ranked based on streaming, social, and sales activity from registered accounts on QQ Music, KuGou Music, KuWo Music, WeSing, Joox, Weibo Music, and Weixin Video Account.

=== TME Wave Chart ===
The TME Wave Chart is a monthly ranking of the top songs in China compiled based on scores and recommendations from more than 250 music industry professionals.

=== TME Korean Chart ===
The TME Korean Chart ranks the top Korean-language songs within China based on streaming and sales activity from the platforms QQ Music, KuGou Music, KuWo Music, Polka Dot, and Joox as well as data from Circle Chart and Hanteo Chart.

The TME Korean Chart contains two lists: Real-time List and Past List. Real-time List shows the top 200 songs and updates every ten minutes. Past List shows the top 100 songs from each charting week, which runs from Monday to Sunday. Songs are ranked based on streaming (50%), sales (30%), and social activities (20%).

This chart follows a set of rules based on length of time since a song's release on Tencent Music Entertainment platform:

- Weeks 1-12: Songs are eligible to chart
- Weeks 13-26: Songs that fall outside the Top 100 are removed from and cannot reenter the chart
- Weeks 27-52: Songs that fall outside the Top 50 are removed from and cannot reenter the chart
- Weeks 52 and beyond: Songs that fall outside the Top 25 are removed from and cannot reenter the chart

=== TME Physical Album Sales Chart ===
The TME Physical Album Sales Chart is a sales chart that ranks the physical record sales based on data from QQ Music and KuGou Music. It contains four lists: Weekly, Monthly, Annual, and Overall.
