= Spotlight (Xiao Zhan song) =

2020 single by Xiao Zhan

"Made to Love"

Single by Xiao Zhan
- Language: Mandarin
- Released: April 25, 2020
- Genre: R&B; pop; electronic
- Length: 3:37
- Label: NSM Music
- Composers: Rik Annema; Leroy Sanchez; Wynne Bennett
- Lyricists: Rik Annema; Leroy Sanchez; Wynne Bennett; NANA
- Producers: Wynne Bennett; The Anteloops

Audio sample
- file; help

Spotlight
- Simplified Chinese: 光点
- Traditional Chinese: 光點
Transcriptions
Standard Mandarin
- Hanyu Pinyin: Guāngdiǎn

"Made to Love", also known as "Spotlight", (Note: Simplified Chinese: 光点; traditional Chinese: 光點; pinyin: Guāngdiǎn; lit. 'spot of light'; also translated as "Spot Light", "Spot of Light", "Light Spot", "Light", or "Guang Dian".) is a single by Chinese recording artist Xiao Zhan. It was released on April 25, 2020, as a digital download and was seen as Xiao Zhan's response to the boycott against him on the Chinese internet. As a result, at the same time that "Made to Love" became an extremely successful single, it received polarized reviews online. Selling more than 25 million copies in the first two days after its release, the single was one of the most streamed songs of 2020 and broke the Guinness World Record for the fastest-selling digital track in China.

== Production and release ==
"Made to Love" is Xiao Zhan's first R&B song. Its lyrics are in Chinese and English, and its production involved people from North America, Northern Europe, Spain, and the Netherlands. In addition to performing the song, Xiao Zhan also created the cover art. Xiao Zhan explained the abstract painting as follows: "Veins and arteries are connected in the heart, blue lines and red lines crisscross to form the shape of love, and light starts from love."

The single did not have a publicity campaign before its release. At midnight on April 25, 2020, Xiao Zhan updated his Weibo, shared the single's cover art, and wrote: "I'll bear everything that has happened in mind. Thanks for all the well-intentioned criticism and corrections. Growing on the way." Accompanying this announcement, he also changed his Weibo profile picture, which he had been using for four years, to a picture of the single's cover art. Soon afterwards, Xiao Zhan's studio released the new song "Made to Love". The song became available for download on Tencent Music's services QQ Music, KuGou, and Kuwo.

The song was seen as a response to the Boycott against Xiao Zhan Incident.

== Commercial performance ==
The single was released online on April 25, 2020, and sold at a price of ¥3. On the day of its release, it sold 24,370,000 copies, grossing over ¥73 million (US$10 million) and surpassing Cai Xukun's EP Young (2019), which sold 13,350,000 copies and grossed over ¥66 million. On its second day it surpassed 25 million copies, setting a new record. The single reached the top of QQ Music's annual bestseller list, QQ Music's list of top new songs, and Tencent's "up to you" list (由你音乐榜). It was reported that on April 25, "Xiao Zhan's worldwide fan club" was the biggest buyer on QQ Music, with 9,088,000 digital album purchases. On April 28, sales surpassed ¥100 million.

"Made to Love" became the most-downloaded song and the highest-grossing digital single in Chinese music history. The single's sales by April 26 broke the Guinness World Record for the fastest-selling digital track in China. The Tencent Music Entertainment Awards named it the most popular digital single of 2020. It was listed seventh on IFPI's international list of the 10 bestselling singles of the year and on Guinness World Records' list of 2020's most streamed tracks with 1.48 billion subscription stream equivalents.

Fans encouraged each other to buy multiple copies of the song as a show of support for Xiao Zhan; they saw the single as an opportunity for Xiao Zhan to improve his reputation amid the ongoing controversy. This boosted the single's sales, with fans reportedly buying an average of close to 66 copies each. The mass-purchasing campaign was controversial enough that Xiao Zhan's agency posted on Weibo reminding fans to focus on their other priorities in life.

== Reception ==
On April 26, 2022, it was reported that after the single's release, its rating on Douban reached 7.5 out of 10; it "received praise from critics in the music industry and got a bumper harvest in both sales and word of mouth". The single's Douban rating was volatile: it rose to 10 points out of 10, then dropped to 3.2 out of 10, with reviews from 48,000 Douban users. The rating later rose back to 6. At noon on April 26, the single's rating was 5.7, with reviews from more than 75,000 users, among which 54.6% had given 5-star reviews and 30.3% had given 1-star reviews. Together, these polarized ratings represented 84.8% of the single's reviewers.

Supporters say that the lyrics and Xiao Zhan's singing are excellent, and that Xiao Zhan handled the R&B riffs well. Opponents say that "Made to Love" is a typical example of an assembly-line product of the idol industry, that its melody is comfortable but has no personality, and that the lyrics are cliched. According to an analysis in National Business Daily, "Most fans' line of thinking is, 'Maybe his singing isn't the best, but it does make you want to support him'."

== Charts ==
=== Weekly charts ===
Chart performance for "Made to Love"
| Chart (2020–22) | Peak position |
|---|---|
| China (TME UNI Chart) | 1 |
| Hungary (Single Top 40) | 26 |
| Japan Download Songs (Billboard Japan) | 61 |
| US World Digital Song Sales (Billboard) | 5 |

=== Year-end charts ===
2020 year-end chart positions
| Chart (2020) | Position |
|---|---|
| China (TME UNI Chart) | 1 |
| Worldwide (IFPI) | 7 |

== See also ==
- Anti-boycott
