= Music censorship in China =

Chinese music censorship constitutes a multifaceted and enduring phenomenon that has wielded a substantial influence in molding the cultural milieu of China. Spanning across a spectrum of musical genres, from time-honored folk tunes to contemporary pop and rock, the realm of music in China has endured protracted governmental regulation and surveillance. This oversight transcends the mere confinement of content and encompasses a myriad of determinants, such as lyrical content, artistic expression, and the very appearance of musicians themselves. Chinese music censorship has evolved over the years, with different eras marked by varying levels of control, specific ideologies and policies, as well as the advancement in technology.

== Timeline ==
=== 1949-1976: Formation of the PRC & the Cultural Revolution ===
Following the formation of the People's Republic of China (PRC), the Chinese government and musical artists were consistently in line with one another; with the government specifically calling for the production of socialist propaganda and artists responding by creating music praising the revolutionary spirit of the time period and professing their hopes for the future. During the Cultural Revolution (1966–1976), practically all forms of music deemed not communist and upholding the PRC was banned in efforts to purge capitalistic messaging, with some artists even facing imprisonment and violence. The legacy of censorship and government control from this particular period have influenced the music industry ever since.

=== 1977-1995: Deng Xiaoping and economic reform to Tiananmen Square ===
After the death of Chairman Mao Zedong in 1976 and the replacement of his successor Hua Guofeng with Deng Xiaoping in 1981, a series of economic/market reforms were pursued, with the aim of 'opening up' China and liberalizing. With the government more focused on economic policymaking than cultural production, popular music was able to diversify away from solely socialist messaging and became more widespread amongst the masses. Much of the music in China during the 1980s originated in Hong Kong and Taiwan through the smuggling and spread of cassettes, and this music was then reproduced by mainland Chinese artists. During this time period the Chinese rock scene flourished for a short period, as well as love songs sung by pop stars. Following the 1989 Tiananmen Square protests and massacre, the Chinese government clamped down on music that had any connection to the pro-democracy movement. Pro-democracy anthems were strictly banned and multiple artists faced state pressure and prosecution. Many artists engaged in self-censorship, avoiding politically sensitive topics and themes in their music to avoid government reprisals. Additionally, there were significant crackdowns on live performances, with artists being forced to gain licenses to perform live and go through an authorisation process which included presenting their lyrics to authorities such as the Bureau of Culture. Multiple artists had concerts and tours canceled arbitrarily, and the Chinese rock scene was particularly targeted because of its allegedly rebellious nature and subversive messaging through artists' long hair, musical lyrics, and performances.

=== 1995-Present: Rise of the internet and Xi Jinping era ===
As the influence of digital platforms and the internet has grown, the Chinese government has encountered new challenges in regulating music content and the methods of censorship have shifted within the increasingly interconnected world. During this era, there emerged a noteworthy shift towards acknowledging the necessity of digital technology, resulting in a discernible, though relative, relaxation of control measures in comparison to the immediately post-Tiananmen era.

The initial rise of digital music services in the 1990s prompted the government to implement measures aimed at monitoring and controlling online music content. This included content filtering and removal, primarily targeting material considered politically sensitive, explicit, or subversive. Such measures reflected the government's evolving strategies to adapt to the digital age while maintaining oversight of cultural expression. A key development was the introduction of real-name registration requirements on online platforms in 2012, which mandated that users register with their actual identities. This provided authorities with the means to monitor users' activity, including the sharing of music. This focus on online surveillance underscored the government's efforts to assert control in the digital sphere. The emergence of the "Great Firewall of China" during this era imposed restrictions on access to foreign websites and services, with implications for the availability of music and music streaming platforms. The regulation of online music licensing and distribution also became more pronounced, with songs required to receive pre-approval before being made publicly accessible. While the government retained control over online content, this period represented a phase of relative openness within an evolving cultural and technological landscape.

Under the more recent general secretaryship of Xi Jinping, there has been a surge in increasingly rigorous censorship measures. The 'Xi Jinping Era' has brought about a pronounced crackdown on music that challenges the Communist Party's authority, criticizes government policies, or addresses sensitive political issues, resulting in significant consequences for artists and songs that diverge from the government's prescribed guidelines. Additionally, there is a renewed emphasis on the promotion of traditional Chinese culture and nationalist sentiments within music, underscoring the extent of ideological conformity expected during this era. The emphasis is specifically on themes of patriotism, social harmony, and adherence to party ideology.

== Examples of music censorship in China ==
=== Entertainment shows ===
In China's entertainment industry, there is a growing phenomenon of altering music lyrics in TV shows and live performances. This trend is driven by a set of unspoken rules that seek to promote a more positive and censor-friendly atmosphere. Chinese TV shows, particularly variety and singing competitions, have imposed a ban on discussing themes related to death, sorrow, loneliness, decadence, and supernatural beliefs. Recent examples illustrate this phenomenon, such as when the feminist song "母系社会" 'Matriarchy' was performed with drastically altered lyrics, replacing potentially sensitive words with more innocuous ones, such as changing"着床" to "擦窗" 'Going Bed Turns into Window Cleaning' to remove any counter narratives. These changes not only impact artistic freedom but also generate controversy and debate among both artists and audiences, as they significantly deviate from the original meaning of the songs. It is a reflection of the broader control that the Chinese authorities exert over cultural and creative expressions, limiting freedom and creativity while reinforcing a sanitized and government-approved narrative.

=== Cui Jian ===
Cui Jian's song 'Nothing to My Name' (一无所有) has been called the unofficial anthem for the 1989 Tiananmen Square protests. Cui visited the student protestors at Tiananmen Square, giving a concert to support the hunger strikes fifteen days before the government crackdown. The song has become highly politicized because of its association with the protests, widely interpreted as expressing the younger generation's anger over their lack of freedom and rights. However, Cui has denied that the song is about the government, calling it "just a love song" though 'Nothing to My Name' has kept its controversial status in the eyes of the Chinese government. In 2014, China Central Television refused Cui Jian permission to sing 'Nothing to My Name' on the state broadcaster's annual gala show celebrating the lunar new year. Cui's manager, You You, announced that Cui had quit the show because he did not want to sing another song. Cui subsequently received praise for refusing to comply with China's censorship measures.

After the Tiananmen Square incident, it has been claimed that Cui was banned from performing in Beijing from 1989 to 2007 but was still allowed to make a select few performances, such as an organized tour to promote the Asian Games in 1990. He and his producers were restrained by music publishing laws in the 1980s, bypassing them by issuing Cui's cassettes through companies in Taiwan and Hong Kong. This helped him to circumvent political censorship, but was used to a lesser extent after independent record labels were allowed to exist from the mid-1990s.

=== Li Zhi ===
Li Zhi is an independent folk singer whose music has delved into sensitive topics within mainland China, resulting in censorship. His works often include deep reflection on reality and major political movements. This includes songs like "广场" (Square) and "1990年的春天" (Spring of 1990), which can be seen as commemorations of the 1989 Tiananmen Square incident, as well as a song titled "人民不需要自由" (The People Don't Need Freedom), satirizing the strict governmental control and a repressed society. As a result, Zhi's music works and personal pages related to him have disappeared from online music media. On April 3, 2019, the Sichuan Provincial Department of Culture and Tourism announced that they halted an artist's plan to conduct a series of concert tour performances in Sichuan due to 'improper behavior', which indirectly referred to Lizhi, and it was speculated the cancellation is in fear of any commentary for the approaching 30th anniversary of the Tiananmen massacre. His official accounts on Chinese social media platforms WeChat and Weibo, under the name "南京李志" (Li Zhi of Nanjing), have also been subject to censorship. Music websites in mainland China, such as QQ Music, NetEase Cloud Music, and Douban Albums, have removed Li Zhi's works and pages.

=== GAI, PGOne, & Chinese hip-hop ===
Hip-hop has existed as an underground subculture in China since the 1980s, and the 2000s onwards saw the integration of 'soft' hip hop sounds and aesthetics in popular music, including propaganda promoting Xi Jinping's political doctrines in a 2016 animation published by Xinhua News Agency. In 2017 the show The Rap of China appeared on iQiyi, China's Netflix equivalent, with the first season garnering 2.68 billion views within the year. The show proved to quickly catapult underground Chinese hip hop culture into the commercial mainstream of China, a broadly rebellious culture that the Chinese Ministry of Culture blacklisted dozens of songs from in 2015 for content that they claimed would encourage obscenity, violent crime and immorality.

After this sudden rise to the mainstream, hip-hop faced a ban in China, when the co-winner of The Rap of China in 2017, PGOne, became embroiled in an affair scandal, leading to public discussion of lyrics from his 2015 song 'Christmas Eve' that were deemed to be misogynistic and encouraging of drug use. Following the scandals, various national institutions denounced PGOne, and the State Administration of Radio, Film, and Television (SARFT) declared the authority's intention to prohibit tattooed artists and hip-hop culture on television broadcasting. Although hip-hop has continued as a significant cultural force in China, it is controlled by Xi's cultural tone of "decency" that "reflect[s] Chinese spirit, and guide[s] the general public in the positive direction".

GAI, the other co-winner of The Rap of China in 2017, survived the hip-hop censorship by "sacrificing artistic independence and subjecting to public acceptability and political correctness," releasing three patriotic songs after the ban, such as 2019's 'Long! Live! China!', which holds a 3.8/10 rating on China's major review-aggregation website, Douban, considered hypocritical and propagandistic by fans. GAI's pre-mainstream music and image, exemplified in songs such as 2015's 'Gangsta', was rapped in Sichuan dialect that reflected the authentic reality of his troubled experiences as a poor, marginalized migrant growing up in Neijiang and depicts drug use, prostitution, gambling, gang warfare, police brutality, human trafficking, and in the intense music video shows the bodies of several tattooed men, including GAI, smoking. In 2016–17, GAI wrote a series of songs that softened his earlier controversy whilst maintaining intensity and authenticity, and more clearly highlighted his moral values of jianghu (Chinese: 江湖)(brotherhood between strangers, loyalty, and a belief in cause-effect/karma) and jiaguo (Chinese: 家国)(self-discipline to fulfill family and national duties), rooted in Chinese literary and Confucian culture. In contrast, the music video for GAI's 'The Great Wall' shows him wearing sportswear brand Li-Ning with 'China' printed on the front of the jacket, his tattoos concealed, his mannerisms more restrained, standing on top of the Great Wall of China with the lyrics distinctly praising a nationalistic, patriotic outlook.

== See also ==
- Censorship in China
