= Shenzhen Satellite TV =

- Country: China
- Broadcast area: international
- Stations: ShenzhenTV
- Headquarters: Guangzhou-Shenzhen

Programming
- Language: Chinese language

Ownership
- Owner: Shenzhen Radio, Film and Television Group

History
- Founded: 2004
- Launched: 28 May 2004

Shenzhen Satellite TV is a flagship television channel operated by the Shenzhen Media Group. It broadcasts simultaneously in both standard-definition and high-definition formats, airing 24 hours a day. The channel began trial broadcasts on May 28, 2004, and officially launched via satellite in December 2004. It was approved as a city-level satellite television channel with the purpose of serving as a communication platform aimed at Hong Kong audiences.

Shenzhen Satellite TV's programming includes news, television dramas, current affairs commentary, variety shows, and financial programs.

The channel is broadcast nationwide via the ChinaSat 6A and ChinaSat 9 satellites and has gained a certain level of influence among Chinese communities both within China and abroad. Its current affairs program Winning High Ground (Chinese: 决胜制高点) ranked fifth in the 2013 national variety show rankings. According to CSM Media Research data from 2011, Shenzhen Satellite TV ranked among the top ten provincial-level satellite channels in China, with its prime-time ratings placing it eighth nationwide.

The international version of the channel, internally referred to as the Shenzhen International Channel, is broadcast via the Apstar 5 satellite, covering Southeast Asia, Central Asia, Oceania, and the Pacific region. It is also available on the Great Wall TV platform in the Americas, Europe, Canada, Southeast Asia, Australia, and New Zealand. There are differences among the international general version, the Hong Kong version, and the mainland Chinese version. For example, the Hong Kong version includes certain Cantonese-language programs, while the American version does not rebroadcast CCTV's Xinwen Lianbo.

== History ==
On May 28, 2004, Shenzhen Satellite TV began trial broadcasting, airing on the Shenzhen Cable TV network and Channel 26 of Hong Kong Cable TV (Hong Kong version). In December of the same year, the channel officially launched its satellite broadcast.

In 2005, the Finance Channel (Shenzhen TV Channel 8) was rebranded as Shenzhen Satellite TV, broadcasting simultaneously with the original domestic satellite version. It replaced the previous version aired on Tianwei Cable TV.

In 2008, Shenzhen Satellite TV launched a major television event titled "Sailing Across the Seas – The Shenzhen Satellite Ship's Coastal Tour to Commemorate the 30th Anniversary of Reform and Opening-Up", which began with a departure ceremony held at Bund Park in Tianjin Binhai New Area. The event featured a sailboat named Shenzhen Satellite Ship traveling from Tianjin along the coastline to Shenzhen, aiming to promote the achievements of the Shenzhen Special Economic Zone and the reform and opening-up policy.

In May 2009, Shenzhen Satellite TV underwent a rebranding. During prime time, it launched a series of news programs including Live Hong Kong and Macau, Shenzhen News, and Decryption. At that time, aside from one or two news programs on certain CCTV channels, most provincial satellite channels across China were primarily broadcasting dramas or entertainment shows during prime time.

On September 28, 2009, the high-definition version of Shenzhen Satellite TV officially launched. Initial cable TV operators carrying the HD signal included Beijing Gehua Cable, Jiangsu Cable, Hangzhou Wasu, Shenzhen Tianwei Cable, and Shanghai Oriental Cable.

On December 1, 2010, the Hong Kong version of Shenzhen Satellite TV began broadcasting on digital terrestrial television in Hong Kong via Asia Television (ATV), on Channel 17, marking the full landing of Shenzhen Satellite TV across the Hong Kong territory. Prior to this, the Hong Kong version had already been available on Channel 26 of Hong Kong Cable TV and Channel 852 of now Broadband TV.

In October 2013, Shenzhen Satellite TV officially partnered with Tudou.com, enabling resource sharing and content rights integration.

On November 15, 2014, at approximately 7:27 a.m., Shenzhen Satellite TV updated its program design and rebranded its on-air packaging, including previews and promos.

On May 15, 2015, the All-Media Integrated News Center of Shenzhen Media Group was officially launched. From that day, all news and information programs under Shenzhen Satellite TV have been produced and broadcast from this new center.

On April 2, 2016, following the non-renewal of ATV's free television license, the Hong Kong SAR government reclaimed ATV's analog and digital spectrum. As a result, the international version of Shenzhen Satellite TV ceased its terrestrial broadcast in Hong Kong.

On May 4, 2016, now Broadband TV Hong Kong launched Shenzhen Satellite TV on Channel 540, marking the channel's return to broadcasting in Hong Kong.

On July 28, 2017, Shenzhen Satellite TV was added to the "Hu Hu Tong" direct broadcast satellite platform operated by China's State Administration of Press, Publication, Radio, Film and Television, making it available to all Hu Hu Tong users.

On November 28, 2017, during the "2018 Shenzhen Satellite TV AMAZING X Presentation", Shenzhen Satellite TV announced a new strategic partnership with iQIYI. Under this agreement, ten major drama series produced by iQIYI would premiere exclusively on Shenzhen Satellite TV nationwide starting in 2018.

On December 8, 2017, in the early morning, Shenzhen Satellite TV updated its logo along with the rest of Shenzhen TV. The new logo retained the white silk-like base while embedding a pink card-like square shape, with the channel name displayed at the bottom.

On September 1, 2018, Hong Kong Cable TV moved the Hong Kong version of Shenzhen Satellite TV from Channel 26 to Channel 335.

Beginning on December 7, 2018, Shenzhen Satellite TV's standard-definition channel started broadcasting in 16:9 aspect ratio.

On February 4, 2019, during the 2019 CCTV Spring Festival Gala, both the HD and SD domestic feeds of Shenzhen Satellite TV temporarily switched to unified HD broadcast. After the broadcast ended, the feeds resumed simulcasting CCTV-1, with HD feeds carrying CCTV-1 HD and SD feeds carrying CCTV-1 SD signals.

== Program ==
=== News and Information ===
Shenzhen Satellite TV produces news programs including general news programs, current affairs commentary programs, and military analysis programs.

==== SZTV News ====
SZTV News is the main evening news program broadcast by Shenzhen Satellite TV. It premiered on January 1, 1984, the day Shenzhen TV Station was founded. It mainly covers major political news and people's livelihood news in Shenzhen, and sometimes also covers domestic, Hong Kong-Macau-Taiwan, and international news. The program airs daily from 18:30 to 19:00 (Mainland China version).

To enrich the content and format of Shenzhen political news reporting, since January 11, 2021, Shenzhen Satellite TV aired a political commentary segment titled Evening Report every night from 22:20 to 22:30, which was divided into two parts: Today's Viewpoint and Evening Commentary. The former reported the latest trends across various industries and fields, while the latter invited experts to analyze Shenzhen's political affairs.

(As of June 27, 2024, the program has been discontinued, and the time slot was replaced by Straight Finance produced by the International Communication Center's Straight News team.)

At the end of the program, during the weather forecast segment, real-time cityscape footage similar to that of Hong Kong Cable News is shown.

==== Noon Focus ====
Noon Focus (formerly titled 30 Minutes at Noon) is a news program that premiered on January 1, 2005, and is broadcast daily at 11:50 a.m. on Shenzhen Satellite TV. The program is divided into two parts: the first part broadcasts major domestic, Hong Kong-Macau-Taiwan, and international news, as well as important local news in Shenzhen, but contains relatively little political content; the second part features social news and the popular science weather segment Talking About the Sky and Earth (Highlights Edition).

When the program first launched, its runtime was 30 minutes. After the channel was reformatted, the program was also extended, and it currently runs for 50 minutes.

==== Greater China Live ====
Greater China Live premiered on May 1, 2006, and is broadcast every night at 22:30 (Mainland China version). The program provides information on international current affairs, military, entertainment, culture, lifestyle, and finance, with coverage extending beyond Hong Kong, Macau, and Taiwan. The show presents its reports through live connections, special commentaries, and interviews. During broadcast, a news ticker runs along the bottom of the screen displaying news briefs.

For major events, the program sends reporters for on-site coverage and collaborates with media outlets across Mainland China, Hong Kong, Macau, and Taiwan, including Sina.com, Sohu.com, TVB (Hong Kong), Wen Wei Po, Hong Kong Commercial Daily, TVBS (Taiwan), and TDM (Macau).

In 2009, Greater China Live was selected as one of the Top 12 Programs of the Year by Variety, the magazine overseen by the State Administration of Radio, Film and Television.

Currently, Greater China Live shares a production team with Straight Finance, Military Live Room, Hot Spot Debate, and Key Insight. This team is known as the Straight News team, formerly known as the Greater China Live team.

==== Hot Spot Debate ====
Hot Spot Debate is a current affairs program launched by Shenzhen Satellite TV on April 2, 2012. Each episode focuses on the in-depth analysis of a single current affairs topic, with commentary provided by several guest analysts. The program utilizes a virtual studio and incorporates 3D special effects.

Hot Spot Debate ranked fifth in the 2013 national variety show rankings. The program airs every Monday from 21:18 to 22:25 (Mainland China version).

==== Key Insights ====
Key Insights is a cutting-edge news program produced by Shenzhen Satellite TV, focusing on the analysis of international current affairs. It premiered on March 6, 2013. The program analyzes international news events by examining the micro-expressions of key news figures. It is filmed in a virtual studio and features psychology experts and current affairs commentators as guests.

The show airs every Wednesday from 21:20 to 22:25 (Mainland China version).

==== Military Situation ====
Military Situation is an international current affairs program on Shenzhen Satellite TV. Like Key Insights and Hot Spot Debate, the program uses a virtual studio and invites current affairs commentators to participate. Its coverage is not limited to military topics—for example, in 2014, it reported on the Malaysia Airlines Flight MH370 crash.

The program airs every Tuesday from 21:20 to 22:25 (Mainland China version).

=== Special Programming ===
==== Special Arrangements During Typhoons ====
If the Shenzhen Meteorological Observatory issues a yellow typhoon warning signal or a higher-level signal, Shenzhen TV will begin broadcasting a special typhoon report every hour starting from 8:00 AM until 12:00 midnight. If the warning signal is still in effect by noon, the regular program "Midday 30 Minutes" scheduled at 11:50 AM will be suspended and replaced by approximately 10 minutes of major political news, followed by continued special typhoon programming.

==== Variety Shows ====
Shenzhen TV's variety shows are generally broadcast from Thursday to Sunday nights and rebroadcast during the daytime. Most of these variety shows follow a seasonal format, with some running for several months before ending. Shenzhen TV also occasionally hosts large-scale events. Some of the station's well-known variety shows include The Generation Show, Dinner Is Over Show, Men Left Women Right, and Big Star Birthday Party.

On May 27, 2011, Shenzhen TV underwent a revamp and began airing a self-produced program every evening at 9:20 PM during prime time, seven days a week. This schedule, which includes a mix of variety and news programs, is known as the "Evening 9:20 Program Group" and has been maintained to this day.

Currently, programs aired during evening prime time include the news and information shows Winning the High Ground (Monday), Military Live Room (Tuesday), Key Insight (Wednesday), and the variety shows Hello! Interviewer (Thursday) and Love Finds the Right Door (Friday), among others.

=== Seasonal Variety Shows ===
==== The Generation Show ====
The Generation Show is a seasonal interactive variety program broadcast by Shenzhen TV. The show is adapted from VRT variety program De generatieshow. In each episode, celebrities popular among audiences born in the 1960s, 1970s, 1980s, 1990s, and 2000s are invited to compete in a series of decade-themed quizzes and games. The program incorporates elements such as archival footage, physical objects, musical performances, and fashion shows to evoke memories from different generations.

The show is hosted by Zhao Yio and has aired eighteen seasons since its debut on May 7, 2011.

==== Crazy Jungle ====
Source:

==== Frontiers of Sci-Tech Innovation ====
China's first daily science and innovation news program centered on AIGC (Artificial Intelligence Generated Content) and big data.

==== Variety Shows No Longer Airing ====
- Super Emotional Face-Off
- Hongkongers in the Hometown
- Overseas Students
- Top Trending Songs
- Decoded
- Big Star Birthday Party
- Mengniu Sour Yogurt Music Dream Academy
- Heartbeat Accelerator
- Telling You Today
- Don't Lie to Me
- 22-Degree Observation
- The Great Traveler
- Men Left Women Right
- The Great Entertainer
- A Cappella Troupe
- Lip Sync Battle
- One-Click Start
- Maker Planet
- Maker Planet 2
- Night Questions
- Dinner Is Over Show
- The Generation Show
- Bailao Club
- Partners of China
- The Amazing Race China
- Crazy Jungle
- 投吧 Together
- Speeding Up for Dreams
- Innovators
- Love Finds the Right Door
- Warrior's Journey
- Glory of the Warriors
- Shining Daddy
- Shining Daddy 2
- Saturday with Daddy
- Innovative Youth Talk
- Book Aroma Journey
- Made by China and Germany
- The Power of Faith
- Speed Travel Journal
- Whose Home Is This?
- Hot Topics Cloud Login
- Dance! Qiwu
- Time's Friend
- Wisdom of Water
- Trends
- Uncle Kai's Magical Fairy Tale Night
- Surging China
- The Green Dream of the Desert
- Unlimited Firepower
- My Lab Coat
- My Lab Coat 2
- Hello! Interviewer
- Dance! Qiwu 2
- Early Morning World – Yum with Dim Sum
- Two Days and One Night: Mountains and Sea
- Summer Shockwave
- Interesting Dorm Chat
- Hot Mama Academy
- Warmth Around You
- Ten Minutes Between Classes
- Let's Explore Love Together
- New Year Concert
- Fanden Reading: Just Evolution Annual Speech
- Hong Kong, Our Story
- Hi! Free Life
- A Very Quiet Distance
- Greater Bay Area Guest Room
- Wonderful Residents
- Between Classes: See the Rivers and Mountains
- Evening News Report
- Dinner Is Over Show
- Men Left Women Right
- Evening News Report
- The Ambassador's Mission

=== TV Dramas ===
Like other provincial satellite TV stations, Shenzhen TV dedicates the majority of its daily programming schedule to TV dramas, including idol dramas, contemporary dramas, and costume dramas, mainly domestic productions. Occasionally, it also produces original dramas, such as Painted Skin. Premiere episodes are primarily scheduled during the evening time slots.

- Monday to Thursday, Saturday, Sunday: 19:30–21:30
- Friday: 19:30–21:00

=== Animation ===
Shenzhen TV broadcasts animated shows during weekday mornings (Monday to Friday), primarily featuring animations produced in mainland China.

=== Documentaries ===
Shenzhen TV airs the program Mystery Moment during weekday lunchtimes (Monday to Friday). It also produces documentaries irregularly, such as Home Chef, and broadcasts documentaries produced by CCTV-4. Additionally, in response to requirements from the State Administration of Radio, Film, and Television, Shenzhen TV airs documentaries with the theme of the "Chinese Dream."

Home Chef

Home Chef is a seasonal documentary series broadcast by Shenzhen TV, with two seasons aired so far. The first season tells stories related to food during the entrepreneurial journey of a food e-commerce business, while the second season adopts a microfilm style, with each episode focusing on one theme and portraying the cultural and emotional significance behind the featured food stories. The first season aired every Sunday at 21:20 starting November 15, 2015, with a total of 12 episodes. The second season aired every Friday at 21:25 starting November 25, 2016.

The first season of Home Chef was purchased by Hong Kong TVB and began airing on the J5 channel on December 15, 2016.

=== Major Events ===
Shenzhen TV occasionally collaborates with other organizations to hold large-scale events, including its annual Shenzhen TV New Year's Eve Concert during the Spring Festival.

- "Sailing Ten Thousand Miles — Shenzhen TV Ship Commemorates the 30th Anniversary of Reform and Opening-Up Coastal Voyage" (2008): A documentary program featuring the sailing of the yacht "Shenzhen TV Ship" from Tianjin along the coastline to Shenzhen. The journey's main purpose was to promote the achievements of the Shenzhen Special Economic Zone and the reform and opening-up policy. (Special page [archived in the Internet Archive])
- The Amazing Race (2014–2017): The Chinese version of the American CBS reality show The Amazing Race, documenting multiple teams competing in a global race over one month.
- China Super Music Contest (2013–2014): A national-level music competition jointly organized by the China Federation of Literary and Art Circles and the China Musicians Association, hosted by Shenzhen Broadcasting and Television Group.
- China-Korea Dream Team (2015):A reality show co-produced by Shenzhen TV and South Korea's KBS. The show originated from KBS's variety program Dream Team and featured celebrity teams from China and Korea competing in various challenges.

=== Prime-Time Domestic Programs in China ===
News programs are in green；variety and lifestyle programs are in gold；drama series and films are in beige。

Time	18:30	19:00	19:30	21:00	21:20	22:00	22:30	23:30
Monday	ShenzhenTV News	Broadcast of CCTV's news broadcast	Golden Theater: The Next Stop is Happiness		Winning Point		Live Streaming Hong Kong, Macau and Taiwan
Tuesday	ShenzhenTV News	Broadcast of CCTV's news broadcast	Golden Theater: The Next Stop is Happiness		Live Military News		Live Streaming Hong Kong, Macau and Taiwan
Wednesday	ShenzhenTV News	Broadcast of CCTV's news broadcast	Golden Theater: The Next Stop is Happiness		Key Insight		Live Streaming Hong Kong, Macau and Taiwan
Thursday	ShenzhenTV News	Broadcast of CCTV's news broadcast	Golden Theater: The Next Stop is Happiness		Hello! Interviewer		Live Streaming Hong Kong, Macau and Taiwan
Friday	ShenzhenTV News	Broadcast of CCTV's news broadcast	Golden Theater: 《Find Yourself》		Love finds the right door		Live Streaming Hong Kong, Macau and Taiwan
Saturday	ShenzhenTV News	Broadcast of CCTV's news broadcast	period show				Live Streaming Hong Kong, Macau and Taiwan
Sunday	ShenzhenTV News	Broadcast of CCTV's news broadcast	otaku cafeteria	Warrior's Glory			Live Streaming Hong Kong, Macau and Taiwan

== Program Characteristics ==
In mainland China, due to the high policy risk associated with news programs and the difficulty in achieving high ratings, and because local stations generally lack their own news resources, most provincial-level satellite channels rarely broadcast news programs during prime time, instead focusing mainly on producing variety shows and airing drama series. Shenzhen Satellite TV, by contrast, places significant emphasis on news programming, which sets it apart from the vast majority of other satellite channels.

Shenzhen Satellite TV began broadcasting in 2004. In its early days, 80% of its programs were broadcast in Cantonese, reflecting the city's nature as a "migrant city." However, as the State Administration of Radio, Film and Television (SARFT) designated Southern TV as the sole Cantonese-language comprehensive satellite channel, Shenzhen Satellite TV was required to switch entirely to Mandarin broadcasting.

At that time, many provincial-level satellite channels, such as Zhejiang Satellite TV and Hunan Satellite TV, had already gained experience and audiences through the production of variety shows. After Shenzhen Satellite TV switched to Mandarin and began nationwide coverage (entering the Guangzhou market in 2006), it sought higher viewership by leveraging its geographical proximity to Hong Kong and focusing on news programming, which has helped it maintain a position in the second tier of national satellite channels.

In 2006, Shenzhen Media Group was approved to establish a news bureau and studio in Hong Kong. It began dispatching reporters to major international events, and subsequently established news bureaus and studios in Beijing, Shanghai, and Taipei. When major events occur, Shenzhen Satellite TV is able to conduct on-site reporting in a timely manner.

On May 1, 2006, Shenzhen Satellite TV launched the news program "Greater China Live", which summarizes and reports on current affairs, politics, and military news related to Hong Kong, Macau, Taiwan, and the international community, and invites commentators from various regions to provide analysis.

Subsequently, "Military Situation" in 2011, "Hot Spot Debate" in 2012, and "Key Insights"in 2013 were launched to analyze political news from various perspectives. These programs make Shenzhen Satellite TV's prime-time lineup distinct from other satellite channels.

== Station Logo ==
Shenzhen Satellite TV shares the same logo as Shenzhen Media Group: the S-shaped curve represents the initial letter of the pinyin "Shēn", and the reversed Z-shape represents the initial of "Zhèn" (圳). The three lines in the logo were originally rendered in the three primary colors of television signal: red, green, and blue, but were later changed to monochrome.During the early phase of satellite broadcasting, Shenzhen Satellite TV used a red version of the logo, with the two Chinese characters "深圳" (Shenzhen) displayed on the right in a freehand calligraphy style. Before satellite launch, like other channels, the logo was a white "S" emblem accompanied by standard font text such as "SZTV-X". After some time, the channel reverted to the original style, with a white "S" logo and the two Chinese characters "深圳" in standard font. Other channels also adopted this format with the white "S" logo and the channel name in regular font. In 2010, the domestic version of the Shenzhen Satellite TV logo added the characters "卫视" (Satellite TV) to indicate the full name.

On December 8, 2017, in the early morning, Shenzhen TV underwent a network-wide logo update. The new logo was based on the existing white silk-like "S" emblem, with a pink card-like rectangular element embedded within it, and the channel name written beneath the logo. A rotating halo effect with bright highlights was also added for animation. For Shenzhen Satellite TV specifically, the logo text remains "深圳卫视" (for the domestic version) and "深圳" (for the international version).

== Hosts ==
- Wang Haidong
- Shi Qiang (Qiangzi)
- Liu Yuxuan
- Liu Hanze
- Ma Zhijie (Ma Yi)
- Zhang Yi
- Tang Wanqi
- Liu Yingying (also Producer of Science & Innovation Programs at the Satellite Center)
- Feng Xi
- Lu Zihao

== Broadcast Format ==
Standard Definition (SD):Aspect ratio 16:9, 576i resolution, audio in stereo.

High Definition (HD):Aspect ratio 16:9, 1080i resolution, audio in stereo and surround sound.

The terrestrial digital television version broadcast in Shenzhen uses the DTMB standard, with video encoded in MPEG-4 and audio encoded in MPEG-1.

Before the SD version of Shenzhen Satellite TV adopted 16:9 aspect ratio broadcasting, news programs were broadcast by cropping the 16:9 image to a 4:3 frame. Therefore, elements such as the scrolling subtitles at the bottom of the screen and the weather warning icon in the upper right corner were adjusted to accommodate viewers watching the SD version.Drama series and variety programs added black bars at the top and bottom of the screen to prevent subtitles or characters from being partially cut off.For programs with a 4:3 aspect ratio, the HD version of Shenzhen Satellite TV adds black bars on both sides.In news programs, 4:3 news footage is displayed with the sides filled by a blurred background.

=== Reception Methods ===
Satellite Signal Reception: Both the standard definition (SD) and high definition (HD) versions of Shenzhen Satellite TV broadcast to the East Asia region via the Apstar 5 satellite on the 138Ku band and the ChinaSat 6A satellite on the C band (the HD version is encrypted).

Cable Digital Television: Shenzhen Satellite TV (including both SD and HD versions) is available on Shenzhen Tianwei Cable as well as cable TV networks in cities across China.

Terrestrial Digital Television: In the Shenzhen area, the HD version of Shenzhen Satellite TV broadcasts free terrestrial digital TV signals using the DTMB standard on 474 MHz, transmitted from the Wutong Mountain peak to the entire city.

Broadband Television:Shenzhen Satellite TV is accessible via IPTV platforms operated by the three major telecom operators in cities across China (domestic version including HD), and via Hong Kong's now TV (international version).

== Controversies ==
In 2011, the Hong Kong Broadcasting Authority received multiple complaints alleging that several episodes of the program "Greater China Live" contained advertising content that violated the Hong Kong Television Programme and Advertising Code of Practice.

The self-produced program "Come On, Kids" aired by Shenzhen Satellite TV in 2014 sparked criticism from viewers and netizens due to its coverage of the childbirth process. Opponents argued that the program was excessively graphic, violated others' privacy, disrupted delivery room procedures, and "contravened broadcasting ethics." Supporters, however, stated that the show "expressed the greatness of maternal love," reflected the value of life, and served as a reference for inexperienced families. The program was suspended on May 23, 2014.

In November 2018, the Fujian IPTV platform, through the three major telecom operators, took Shenzhen Satellite TV offline—both SD and HD versions disappeared from the platform. The local audience showed no unusual reactions, and the channel was later restored. It is rumored that this was related to competitive tensions caused by Shenzhen Tianwei Cable TV and Shenzhen Telecom IPTV (Shenzhen Guangxin platform) simultaneously dropping Southeast Satellite TV and Xiamen Satellite TV, with Shenzhen Satellite TV's "Greater China Live" competing directly with Southeast Satellite TV's "Strait Express" . The exact reasons remain unclear.

On August 8, 2022, amid the Taiwan Strait tensions triggered by U.S. House Speaker Nancy Pelosi's visit to Taiwan, Shenzhen Satellite TV reported that Pelosi's husband, Paul Pelosi, manages the Asia-focused fund Mingji Asia Fund Management in Hong Kong, overseeing assets totaling US$17.4 billion. This prompted Mingji Asia to issue a statement clarifying that the company has no direct business relationship with the Pelosi family, and pointed out that some media articles repeatedly mistaken the founder, Paul Matthews, for Pelosi's husband Paul Pelosi.

== See also ==
- Shenzhen Media Group
- iQIYI
