= People's Party =

People's Party, Peoples Party or Popular Party may refer to one of the following political parties.

Translations into English of the names of the various countries' parties are not always consistent, but People's Party is the most common.

== Armenia ==
- People's Democratic Party (Armenia)
- People's Party (Armenia)
- People's Party of Armenia

== Aruba ==
- Aruban People's Party (founded 1942, Dutch: Arubaanse Volkspartij, Papiamento: Partido di Pueblo Arubano, AVP)

== Austria ==
- Austrian People's Party (founded 1945, German: Österreichische Volkspartei, ÖVP)
- German People's Party (Austria)
- Trentino People's Party

== Australia ==
- Australian People's Party
- Queensland People's Party
- People's Party (Victoria)

== Barbados ==
- People's Party for Democracy and Development

== Belarus ==
- Belarusian Popular Party

== Belgium ==
- Christene Volkspartij
- Christian Social Party (Belgium, defunct)
- People's Party (Belgium) (French: Parti populaire, Dutch: Volkspartij, PP)

== Botswana ==
- Botswana People's Party

== British Guiana ==
- Popular Party (British Guiana)

== Bulgaria ==
- People's Party (Bulgaria)

== Burundi ==
- Party of the People (Burundi) (1959–????, French: Parti du Peuple, PP)
- People's Party (Burundi) (1992–????, French: Parti Populaire, PP)

== Burma (Myanmar) ==
- People's Party (Burma) (Colonial era party founded 1925, dissolved 1932)
- People's Party (Myanmar) (Founded in 2017)
- People's Party of Myanmar Farmers and Workers (Founded in 2014)

== Cambodia ==
- Cambodian People's Party (founded 1951, Khmer: គណបក្សប្រជាជនកម្ពុជា, Kanakpak Pracheachon Kâmpuchéa, CPP)

== Canada ==
- People's Party of Canada (founded 2018)

== Catalonia ==
- People's Party of Catalonia (1973)

== China (East Turkestan) ==
- East Turkestan People's Revolutionary Party

== Congo, DR ==
- People's Party for Reconstruction and Democracy (founded 2002, French: Parti du Peuple pour la Reconstruction et la Démocratie, PPRD)

== Croatia ==
- Croatian People's Party (disambiguation) (Croatian: Narodna stranka)
- Croatian Popular Party (disambiguation) (Croatian: Pučka stranka)

== Cuba ==
- People's Party (Cuba)

== Curaçao ==
- National People's Party (Curaçao) (founded 1947, Papiamento: Partido Nashonal di Pueblo, Dutch: Nationale Volkspartij, PNP)

== Czechoslovakia ==
- Czechoslovak People's Party (founded 1919, Czech: Československá strana lidová, ČSL)

== Denmark ==
- Danish People's Party (disambiguation) (Danish: Dansk Folkeparti, DF)
- Conservative People's Party (Denmark) (founded 1916, Danish: Det Konservative Folkeparti, DKF)
- Socialist People's Party (Denmark) (Danish: Socialistisk Folkeparti, SF)
- People's Party (Faroe Islands) (founded 1939)

== Egypt ==
- People Party (founded 2012)

== Estonia ==
- Conservative People's Party of Estonia (founded 2012, Estonian: Eesti Konservatiivne Rahvaerakond, EKRE)

== European Union ==
- European People's Party (founded 1976, EPP)

== Finland ==
- Swedish People's Party of Finland (founded 1906, Swedish: Svenska folkpartiet i Finland, SFP, Finnish: Suomen ruotsalainen kansanpuolue, RKP)
- People's Party (Finland, 1932)

== Germany ==
- Bavarian People's Party
- German People's Party (1868) (1868–1910)
- German People's Party (1918–1933)
- Wendish People's Party
- German National People's Party
- All-German People's Party
- Conservative People's Party (Germany)
- Saxon People's Party

== Greece ==
- People's Party (Greece)

== Greenland ==
- People's Party (Greenland)

== Guam ==
- Popular Party (Guam)

== Guatemala ==
- People's Party (Guatemala)

== Guinea ==
- People's Party of Guinea (French: Parti du peuple de Guinée)

== Guinea-Bissau ==
- Guinean People's Party (founded 2000, Portuguese: Partido Popular Guineense, PPG)

== Hong Kong ==
- New People's Party (Hong Kong) (founded 2011, NPP)

== Iceland ==
- People's Party (Iceland, 2016)
- People's Party (Iceland)

== India ==
- Janata Dal (Secular) or People's Party (Secular), founded in 1999
- Janata Dal (United) or People's Party (United), founded in 2003
- Kongunadu Makkal Katchi or Kongunadu People's Party, founded in 2001
- Bharatiya Janata Party or Indian People's Party (BJP), founded in 1980
- Aam Aadmi Party or Common Man Party (AAP), founded in 2012
- People's Party of Arunachal
- People's Party of Punjab
- Janata Party (1977–2013)

== Iran ==
- Party of the Iranian People
- People's Party (Iran)

== Iraq ==
- People's Party (Iraq) or People's Party for Reform, founded in 2011

== Italy ==
- Sardinian People's Party
- South Tyrolean People's Party
- Italian People's Party (1919)
- Italian People's Party (1994)
- Trentino Tyrolean People's Party

== Kazakhstan ==
- People's Party of Kazakhstan

== Kenya ==
- Peoples Party of Kenya

== Latvia ==
- People's Party (Latvia)

== Liberia ==
- Liberian People's Party

== Malaysia ==
- Parti Rakyat Malaysia or Malaysian People's Party, PRM
- Parti Rakyat Sarawak or Sarawak People's Party, PRS

== Malawi ==
- People's Party (Malawi)

== Mexico ==
- Popular Socialist Party (Mexico)

== Mongolia ==
- Mongolian People's Party

== Montenegro ==
- People's Party (Montenegro)
- People's Party (Montenegro, 1906)

== Netherlands ==
- Catholic People's Party
- Evangelical People's Party (Netherlands)
- People's Party for Freedom and Democracy
- Roman Catholic People's Party

== Nigeria ==
- All Nigeria Peoples Party

== Norway ==
- Norwegian People's Party

== Northern Cyprus ==
- People's Party (Northern Cyprus)
- Populist Party (Northern Cyprus)

== Palestine ==
- Palestinian People's Party

== Pakistan ==
- Pakistan People's Party
- Pakistan Peoples Party (Shaheed Bhutto)

== Panama ==
- People's Party (Panama)

== Papua New Guinea ==
- People's Party (Papua New Guinea)

== Poland ==
- Polish People's Party
- People's Party (Poland)
- Conservative People's Party (Poland)

== Portugal ==
- CDS – People's Party (founded 1974)

== Puerto Rico ==
- People's Party (Puerto Rico)
- Popular Democratic Party (Puerto Rico)

== Romania ==
- People's Party (interwar Romania)
- German People's Party (Romania)
- People's Party (Romania, 2005–06)
- People's Party – Dan Diaconescu

== Russia ==
- People's Party of the Russian Federation

== Samoa ==
- People's Party (Samoa)
- Samoa All People's Party

== San Marino ==
- Sammarinese Populars (founded 2003, Italian: Popolari Sammarinesi, PS)

== Serbia ==
- People's Party (Serbia, 1990)
- People's Party (Serbia, 2008)
- Serbian People's Party (2014)
- People's Party (Serbia, 2017)

== Seychelles ==
- People's Party (Seychelles)

== Sierra Leone ==
- Sierra Leone People's Party
- Peoples Party (Sierra Leone)

== Singapore ==
- Singapore People's Party

== Slovakia ==
- Kotleba – People's Party Our Slovakia
- Slovak People's Party

== Slovenia ==
- Slovenian People's Party

== South Africa ==
- Het Volk (political party)
- Volksparty

== South Korea ==
- People's Party (South Korea, 2016)
- People's Party (South Korea, 2017)
- People Party (South Korea)
- People's Party of Korea (1945–1947)
- People's Party (South Korea, 1963)

== South Ossetia ==
- People's Party of South Ossetia

== Spain ==
- People's Party (Spain)
- People's Party (Spain, 1976)
- People's Party of Catalonia (1973)

== Sweden ==
- Liberal People's Party (Sweden) (founded 1934, Swedish: Folkpartiet liberalerna, L)

== Switzerland ==
- Swiss People's Party
- Evangelical People's Party of Switzerland
- Christian Democratic People's Party of Switzerland

== Syria ==
- People's Party (Syria)

== Taiwan ==
- Taiwan People's Party (since 2019)
- Taiwanese People's Party (1927–1931)

== Thailand ==
- Khana Ratsadon, the group that abolished absolute monarchy, later a political party, in existence from 1927 to 1947
- People's Party (Thailand), known in Thai as Phak Prachachon, a political party since 2024. A reformist group and a successor to Future Forward Party and Move Forward Party
- People's Power Party (Thailand), 1998–2008 political party preceding the modern Pheu Thai Party

== Tibet ==
- People's Party of Tibet

== Tonga ==
- Tonga People's Party

== Turkey ==
- People's Party (Turkey) (more commonly known as the Populist Party (Turkey) (1983–1985))

== Ukraine ==
- People's Party (Ukraine)

== United Kingdom ==
- British People's Party (disambiguation)
- PEOPLE Party (1972–1975)
- People's Justice Party (UK) (1998–2006)

== United States ==
- People's Party (Indiana) (1854-1860)
- People's Party (Illinois) (1873–1875)
- People's Party (Utah) (1870–1891)
- People's Party (United States) (1891–1908)
- People's Party (United States, 1971)
- People's Party (United States, 2017)

== See also ==
- Partido Popular (disambiguation)
- Populist Party (disambiguation)
- People's Movement (disambiguation)
- British People's Party (disambiguation)
- Danish People's Party (disambiguation)
- German People's Party (disambiguation)
- Conservative People's Party (disambiguation)
- Democratic People's Party (disambiguation)
- Liberal People's Party (disambiguation)
- National People's Party (disambiguation)
- People's Democratic Party (disambiguation)
- People's Labour Party (disambiguation)
- People's Republican Party (disambiguation)
- Republican People's Party (disambiguation)
- Socialist People's Party (disambiguation)
- Sinmindang (disambiguation), literally "New People's Party" in Korean language
- Popular Action Party (disambiguation)
- Popular Democrat Party (disambiguation)
- Popular Democratic Party (disambiguation)
- Popular National Party (disambiguation)
- Popular Socialist Party (disambiguation)
- Popular Unity Party (disambiguation)
