= Popular Union =

Popular Union may refer to:

- Popular Union of Equatorial Guinea
- Union populaire française (France)
- Popular Union Party (Panama)
- Popular Union (Peru)
- Union populaire (Quebec)
- Popular Union for the Republic (Togo)

Other uses include:

- Democratic and Popular Union (Bolivia)
- Federal Popular Union (Argentina)
- National Union of Popular Forces (Morocco)
- New Ecologic and Social People's Union (France)
- Popular National Union (Poland)
- Popular Political Union of Trentino (Italy)
- Popular Socialist Union (Chile)
- Popular Unions of Bipartisan Social Groups (Greece)
- Union for a Popular Movement (France)

== See also ==
- People's Union
- Popular Unity
- People's Movement
- Popular front
- People's Party
- Popular Democratic Union
- Popular Republican Union
