= Popular democracy =

Notion of direct democracy

Popular democracy is a notion of direct democracy based on referendums and other devices of empowerment and concretization of popular will. The concept evolved out of the political philosophy of populism, as a fully democratic version of this popular empowerment ideology, but since it has become independent of it, and some even discuss if they are antagonistic or unrelated now (see Values). Though the expression has been used since the 19th century and may be applied to English Civil War politics, at least the notion (or the notion in its current form) is deemed recent and has only recently been fully developed.

== Early usages of the terms and/or the concept ==
Some figures, like TV documentary producer, director and writer Colin Thomas, see the Levellers, resistance of groups to both the Stuart monarchy and Oliver Cromwell's English Republic as early popular democracy advocacy groups. Thomas sees the line of this early popular democracy going through the dissenting church, to the American Revolutionaries and later British trade unionism.

Thomas Paine's Common Sense is sometimes considered to defend a form of popular democracy. Andrew Jackson was considered a defender of popular democracy as a politician and president, and his presidency is considered as having made the transition from republic (Jeffersonian democracy) to popular democracy (Jacksonian democracy) in the United States

Walt Whitman uses the word in Democratic Vistas as description of the vague notion of masse democracy with universal suffrage of a more or less direct and participatory type he defended. He admitted that the system had some dangers, but it "practically justifies itself beyond the proudest claims and wildest hopes of its enthusiasts". William Jennings Bryan may be considered a popular democrat for his support of a democracy based on popular sovereignty.

Theodore Roosevelt is considered a defender of a popular democrat insurgency against big business and elitism.

In the end of the first half of the 20th century, the Christian democratic parties preferred the term "popular democrats" to Christian democrats.

== Mid-20th century ==
In post-independence India, popular democracy, together with economic and social liberalism and hindu nationalism, is considered one of the main currents that tried to define Indian politics since 1947.

Iran is sometimes referred as having a history of popular democracy in parallel with the Pahlevi Monarchy before the overthrowing of Mossadeq and reinstating of the Shah.

Eugene McCarthy was seen as a popular democrat presidential campaigner in 1968.

In 1969 Muammar al-Gaddafi overthrew the pro-western monarchy and created a system he claimed to be a popular democracy.

== Late 20th century ==
Similarly to Gaddafi, Hafez al-Assad, officially ended the one party state of Ba'ath Syria created by the 1963 coup d'état in 1970, declaring the creation of a multi-party popular democracy.

In 1975 Al Gaddafi wrote The Green Book, where he defends his political system as a form of "direct and popular democracy" based on the will of the people instead of representative parliaments.

After the fall of Ferdinand Marcos in 1986, a research and advocacy centre called the Institute for Popular Democracy was created who frequently criticizes "elite politics" and defends reformist local social movements.

Some Burkinabé Communists founded a group who supported a Marxist-Leninist People's Democracy (though with a free-market economic plan) in 1989, the Organization for Popular Democracy - Labour Movement. In 1991 they renounced Marxism-Leninism and transformed their Marxism-Leninism into a form of popular democrat philosophy.

Václav Havel's civil-society-centered democratic Czechoslovakia was considered another form of popular democracy by some.

In 1996 the popular democratic Organization for Popular Democracy - Labour Movement created the Congress for Democracy and Progress, being the current ruling party in Burkina Faso.

== Today ==
The internet is sometimes considered as a vital part or an example of modern popular democratic practices.

Some Marxist groups consider that the current Middle East is currently prepared for and wishes popular democracy (which in this context may be referring to Marxist People's Democracy) but that the "neoconservative design upon the region" and American power prevents this.

There are some signs interpreted by analysts as possibilities of popular democracy, in Nigeria, Abkhazia and Georgia.

Former Venezuelan president Hugo Chávez was sometimes considered to either be practicing or simulating popular democracy.

In 2003 it was published one of the main book-length appraisals of popular democracy, Hilary Wainwright's Reclaim the State: Experiments in Popular Democracy, a criticism of both social democracy and big government and neoliberalism and big business.

== Values ==
As popular democracy is an ideal of direct and participatory democracy based on grassroots, there aren't exactly very defined values beyond support of this kind of democracy over more representative types. But some attempts have been made to define popular democrat ideals based around the idea that this direct democracy is just a step for a full democracy. Some proposals of popular democratic common values have been:

- Civil rights (freedom of speech, debate and enquiry)
- Direct democracy
- respectable, bias-free mass media
- Economic democracy
- Equality before the law
- Popular sovereignty
- Anti-partisanship

Participatory budget and the policies of the Porto Alegre Forum are also associated with popular democracy by some left-wing authors.

As the ideal of popular democracy came out of prepositions of Populism (ex: popular rule in democracy is fairer than elitist parliaments; decisions by general referendums are fairer than decisions by limited groups like parliaments and governments), and as platforms of certain groups claiming to be popular democratic are very similar to those of various democratic and undemocratic populist movements, there is discussion on the relation between both political philosophies.

== Support ==
This ideal is currently supported by Glenn Smith (who was connected to the Rockridge Institute, a now defunct organization) and many other Progressive, Liberal and Populist Democrats.

Taking advantage of the vagueness of the concept many parties in a wide range of ideologies call themselves Popular Democratic Party, Popular Democrat Party or People's Democratic Party, or even Democratic Popular Party or Democratic People's Party and support or claim to support popular sovereignty in some form of popular democracy.

Alistair McConnachie writes frequent articles supporting popular democracy for the think tank Sovereignty, which he directs.

Self-described Populist Harry C. Boyte adopts some popular democrat themes in his support of grassroots democracy.

The Nepalese Maoists also support a socialist, non-elitist, form of popular democracy, which may be understood as a form of Maoist people's democracy but based more on popular participation and less on Vanguard parties.

== Criticism ==
Whitman wrote Democratic Vistas in answer to criticism of universal suffrage and full democracy of Thomas Carlyle in Latter-Day Pamphlets, who considered the popular democratic system to be too many rights given to uneducated masses of the people, as rule should be kept in the hands of highly educated people and aristocrats. These criticisms have been repeated numerous times as a way of showing popular democracy as just another word for mob rule.

The idea of majoritarian, popular-will based democracy has been accused of facilitating the persecution of Sri Lankan Tamils.

Other limitations of popular democracy have been indicated in its relation to other social movements (as feminism and trade unionism).

== See also ==
- Populism
- Popular Democratic Party (disambiguation)
- People's Democratic Party (disambiguation)
- Democratic Popular Party (disambiguation)
- Democratic People's Party (disambiguation)
