= St. Anthony's College, Mijas =

St. Anthony's College

Location
- Mijas; Spain
- Coordinates: 36°33′09″N 4°41′08″W

Information
- Type: Independent School, International School, Day, Co-educational, Nursery School, Primary School, Secondary School,
- Established: 1968
- Website: St Anthony's College

St Anthony's College is an independent educational establishment located between Mijas and Fuengirola, Spain. It is notable as it is the oldest British college on the Costa del Sol, and indeed in Andalucia. It currently offers British education, with convalidated Spanish curriculum from ages 3–18 and has a large range of nationalities in both its student faculty and its teaching staff. It is an accredited school with the British Council, the Spanish Ministry of Education and the Junta Andalucia.

== Location ==
The college is situation on the Camino de Coín, 5 km from Fuengirola and 8 km from Mijas Pueblo. The College serves both of these two population centres as well as Mijas Costa, La Cala de Mijas, Alhaurin el Grande and Coín.

== History ==
=== Origins ===
St Anthony's College was established in 1968 in Benalmadena, initially a drama school it became full education in 1974. The school also moved to Plaza de la Constitucíon, Fuengirola, before moving again to Avenida Acapulco, Los Boliches (current address of the Swedish school) It initially had 6 students and 1 member of staff.

=== Expansion ===
The college moved to its current location on the Camino de Coín in 1994 and has continued to grow ever since, adding a school hall (with stage), science laboratories and an astroturf playing field.

== Houses ==
As with many independent schools, St Anthony's College is divided in houses. These are:

- Cordoba (Blue)
- Granada (Green)
- Sevilla (Yellow)

== Sports ==
St Anthony's College participates in a range of sports. Traditionally, the main college sports have been Football and Basketball, however students also experience competition in Athletics, Swimming, Cross-Country running, Tag Rugby, Hockey, Volleyball and Badminton. The college's sport colours are Red, Black and White. The college participates in school competitions annually and term-by-term.

The college participates in many national and international trips annually of sporting, charitable and cultural significance. Recently these have included trips to Brussels and the European Parliament, World War One trenches, Berlin, Skiing in Sierra Nevada, Adventure trips to Cazorla National Park and trips around the local Malaga area.

The college is also the centre for Stagecoach Drama School and Field of Dreams Football Academy

== Alumni ==
- Duane Da Rocha, Spanish Olympic swimmer
