= People's Union =

People's Union may refer to:

== Political parties ==
- People's Union (Belgium)
- People's Union of Estonia
- Bharatiya Jana Sangh (lit. 'Indian People's Union')
- People's Union (Iraq)
- People's Union (Italy)
- People's Socialist Union (Ivory Coast)
- People's Union (Nigeria)
- People's Union (Russia)
- People's Union (Slovakia)
- People's Union for Wallis and Futuna
- Hungarian People's Union (Hungary)
- Kenya People's Union (Kenya)
- Leonese People's Union (Leon, Spain)
- Spanish People's Union (Spain)

== Other uses ==
- People's Freedom Union (United States)
- People's Union for Civil Liberties (India), a human rights body

== See also ==
- Popular (disambiguation)
- Popular Union
- Popular Unity (disambiguation)
- People's Movement (disambiguation)
- Popular front
- Popular Front (disambiguation)
- People's Party (disambiguation)
- Popular Democratic Union (disambiguation)
- Popular Republican Union (disambiguation)
