= People's Democratic Union =

People's Democratic Union may refer to:

- Russian People's Democratic Union
- People's Democratic Union "New Ukraine"
- Popular Democratic Union (disambiguation)
- Democratic People's Union, Bosnia-Herzegowina

== See also ==
- People's Democratic United Front, a former political coalition in Nepal
- People's Union (disambiguation)
- Democratic Union (disambiguation)
