= Danish People's Party (disambiguation) =

The Danish People's Party is an active political party in Denmark.

Danish People's Party may also refer to:

- Danish People's Party (1993), a defunct local-level political party of Odense
- Danish People's Party (1941–43), a national-socialist party during the German occupation in World War II

== See also ==
- Party of the Danes
