= People's Democracy Party (disambiguation) =

People's Democracy Party may refer to:

- People's Democracy Party (Turkey), Kurdish party 1994–2003
- People's Democracy Party (South Korea), communist party founded 2016
- People's Democracy (Ireland), radical socialist group 1968–1996, mainly in Northern Ireland

== See also ==
- People's Democracy (disambiguation)
- People's Democratic Front (disambiguation)
- People's Democratic Movement (disambiguation)
- People's Democratic Party (disambiguation)
