= Folkpartiet =

Folkpartiet (Swedish: People's Party) may refer to:

- Folkpartiet liberalerna (Liberal People's Party), former name of the Swedish Liberals party
- Svenska Folkpartiet i Finland (Swedish People's Party of Finland), a liberal-centrist political party in Finland representing the Swedish-speaking population

== See also ==
- People's Party
