= Mijas =

- Flag Coat of arms

- Location of Mijas in Spain Mijas (Spain)
- Coordinates: 36°35′44″N 4°38′14″W
- Sovereign state: Spain
- Autonomous community: Andalusia
- Province: Málaga
- Comarca: Málaga
- Judicial district: Costa del Sol Occidental

Government
  - Mayor: Ana Mata (PP) (2023)

Area
  - Total: 148.8 km^{2} (57.5 sq mi)
- Elevation: 428 m (1,404 ft)

Population (2025-01-01)
  - Total: 95,104
  - Density: 639.1/km^{2} (1,655/sq mi)
- Demonym: Mijeños
- Time zone: UTC+1 (CET)
  - Summer (DST): UTC+2 (CEST)
- Website: Official website

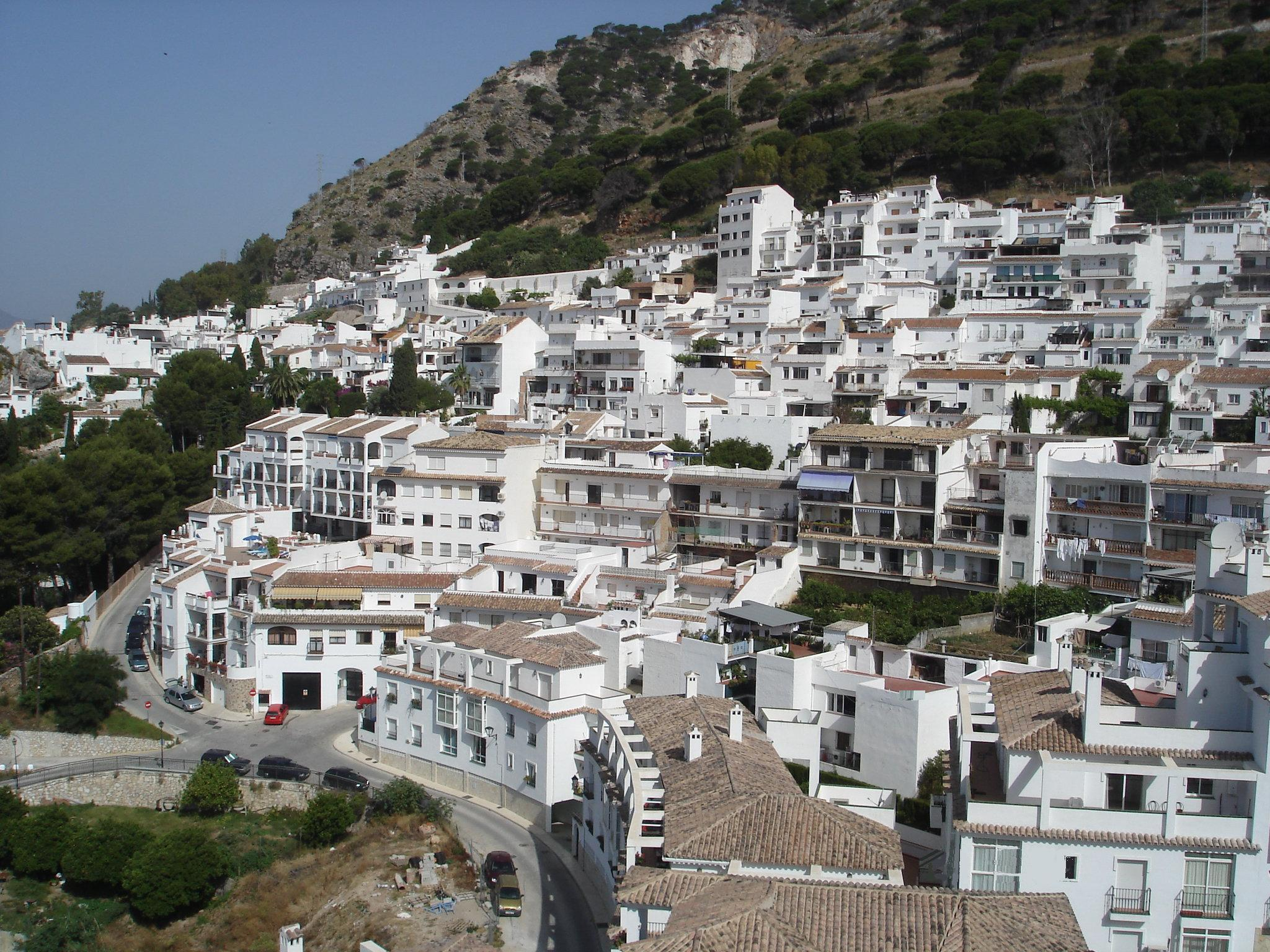
Mijas pueblo

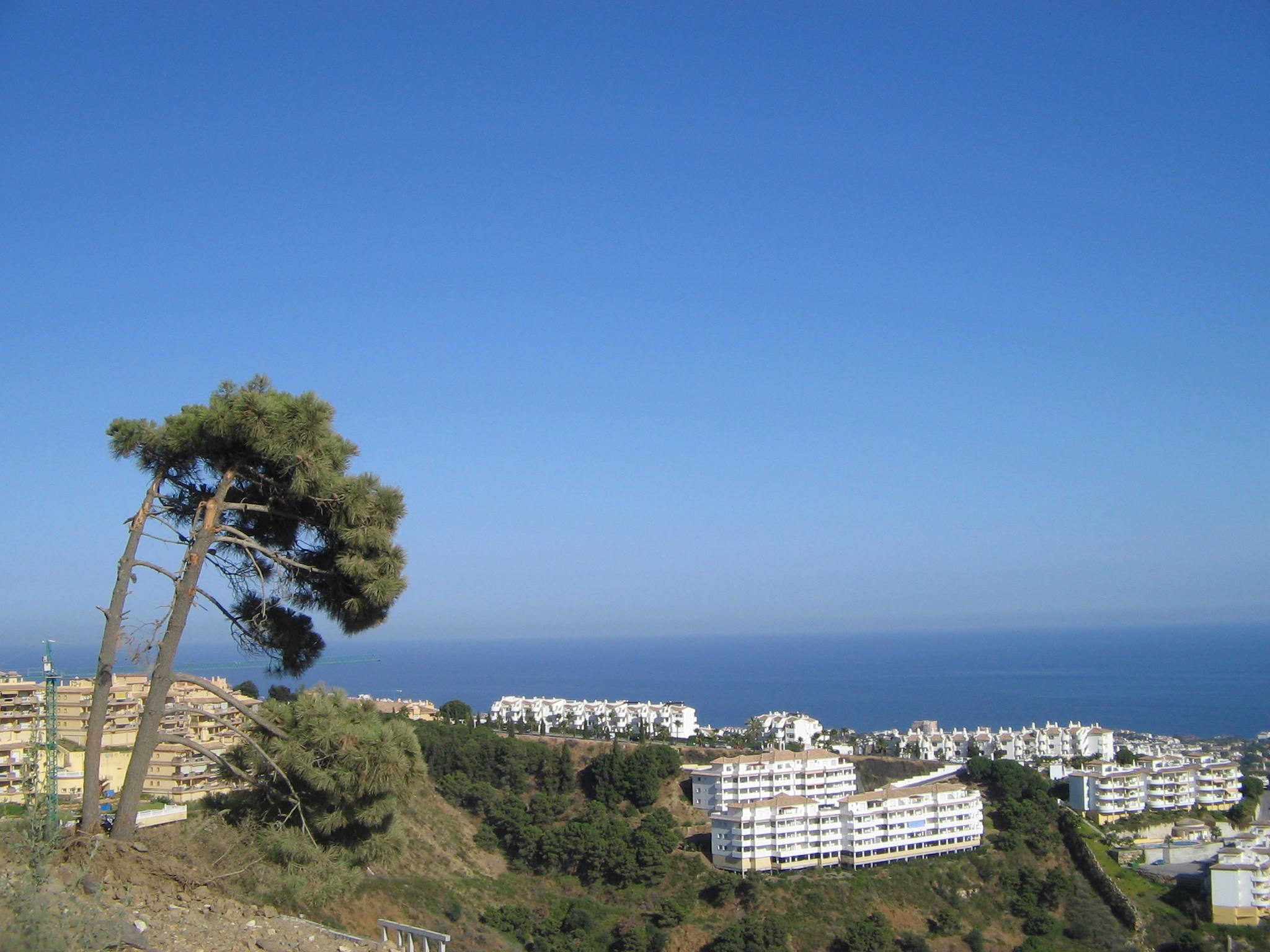
Calahonda

Mijas (/ˈmiːhəs/ MEE-həs; Spanish: [ˈmixas]) is a municipality in the Province of Málaga, in the autonomous community of Andalusia. Located on the southeastern coast of Spain, Mijas belongs to the region of Costa del Sol Occidental. Its center is a typical Andalusian white-washed village, Mijas Pueblo, located on a mountainside about 430 metres or 1,476 feet above sea level, in the heart of the Costa del Sol region.

The municipality has three nuclei, gathering the majority of its population:

- Mijas Pueblo (a hillside village, administrative center of the municipality)
- La Cala de Mijas (a coastal village and a seaside resort)
- Las Lagunas (a suburban and commercial area to the north and west of, and largely integrated with, Fuengirola).

Mijas Costa is used to denominate the coastal area of Mijas, especially the villages Calahonda, Riviera and La Cala de Mijas.

The economy of Mijas is primarily based on tourism, featuring local historical museums and many souvenir shops. The municipality has seven golf courses (four more are under construction), including the La Cala Resort, which is the biggest golf resort in Spain. Agricultural products include potatoes, cereals, and avocados.

== History ==
Mijas was founded in prehistoric times by the Tartessians. The remains of the original fortification are still visible on parts of the exterior wall of the city. The area's mineral wealth attracted ancient Greeks and Phoenicians to the village, as described in Ptolemy's second-century Geography.

The Romans, who kept up a lively commerce with Mijas, knew it as Tamisa. Roman domination was later replaced with the Visigoths' rule after 714 AD. The Visigoths, in turn, were succeeded by the Moors. The Moors allowed the village inhabitants to preserve their property, religion, and customs in exchange for a third of their goods from agriculture, livestock, and farming. It was also the Moors who abbreviated the name of Tamisa to Mixa, which later became modern day Mijas.

During the time of the Emirate of Córdoba, the village was conquered by Umar ibn Hafsun. The village remained under the rule of Bobastro, who was defeated by Abd al-Rahman III in the late 9th century.

In 1487, Mijas resisted the attacks of the Catholic monarchs during the siege of Málaga. After Málaga fell, the inhabitants surrendered and most were sold as slaves. During the Revolt of the Comuneros a few decades later, Mijas remained loyal to the Spanish crown, which granted it the title of Muy Leal ("Very Loyal"). Soon after, Joanna of Castile promoted it to the status of villa (town) and it was exempt from royal taxes.

During this period and into the 19th century, Mijas suffered from intense pirate activity along the coast. It was this pirate activity that motivated the construction of the watchtowers that still stand today.

=== Modern age ===
In the 19th century, Mijas's livelihood was mainly agriculture, fishing, and some farming and mineral extraction. Grape vines were the main source of wealth in Mijas until the Phylloxera plague destroyed all of the vineyards. Also important to Mijas's economy was paper production. Some mills located in the area of Osunillas date back to 1744. The mid-1800s were a productive time for local industry, thanks to the arrival of Valencia's paper-makers, carpenters from Alcoy (an Alicante's Spanish town), and a mop, which created new functional links among manufacturers. Especially notable were the "paper beds", which were very useful in Málaga because they were used as raisin wrappers.

An important historical event happened on December 2, 1831. General Torrijos landed at the beach El Charcón with 52 men. They crossed Mijas, climbed the hill to the top and took refuge at a house on Alqueria in Alhaurin de la Torre, on Molinas County property. They were surrounded by troops, sent by the governor Gonzales Moreno. Torrijos and his companions were shot on the San Andres beaches on December 11, 1831.

In 1873 a road opened between Mijas and Fuengirola, ending the segregation between the two towns which had been in effect since 1841. However, the village remained isolated until the arrival of the first newspaper, Second Republic. There was no phone service until 1953 and the town's architecture consisted mostly of shacks. The population was scattered across the countryside, which consisted of small farms. During the post-war period, hunger and unemployment increased. The only work in the area was the collection of grass for the esparto, but the effects of droughts weakened even this industry. During this era, Mijas also was the scene of anti-Franco army operations because of the support and respect of the army in this area.

In the 1950s, an asbestos factory was built to reduce unemployment and the first small hotel was built because of the growing fame of the Costa del Sol. With the advent of tourism, the towns of La Cala and Las Lagunas began construction of urban residential areas, resulting in the birth of Chollocasa, Cala, and many more cities. Las Lagunas appeared out of nowhere from the interior of a farming community and La Cala was a rural village with just 19 farming families.

== Climate ==
The climate of Mijas, due to its proximity to the sea, enjoys semi-tropical temperatures with winter days being mostly warm/hot and agreeable, and days of hot/very hot weather from May until October. The months of July and August are very hot with temperatures at the end of July and early August hovering around 30C. Winter nights can be occasionally chilly but with only an occasional light frost. The rainfall is below 600 millimetres (24 inches) per year and occurs mainly between October and April. The town boasts some 2,920 hours of sunshine per year.

The climate changes gradually with increasing elevation in the mountains. Temperatures can drop to 10 °C (50 °F). In the peaks, over 600 m (2,000 ft) high, some ice may form in winter, while precipitation increases to almost 800 mm (32 in).

== Education ==
The areas of Mijas, Costa del Sol, and Fuengírola have a state education system. There are also private fee-paying International colleges for all ages, within easy reach. The local International, private fee-paying college is St. Anthony's College, Mijas.

== See also ==
- List of municipalities in Málaga
