= Unidad Popular =

Unidad Popular may refer to:

- Popular Unity (Chile), a left-wing political alliance in Chile that supported Salvador Allende in 1970
- Popular Unity (Spain), a left-wing political alliance in Spain founded in 2015

== See also ==
- Popular Unity (disambiguation)
