= Populist (disambiguation) =

A populist is someone who advocates for any of a variety of political stances that emphasize the idea of the "common people", often in opposition to a perceived elite.

Populist may also refer to:

- Populist Caucus, a Democratic Congressional caucus founded by Bruce Braley of Iowa
- Populist Party (United States), an alternate name of the People's Party, a major political party in the United States in the late 19th century
- The Progressive Populist, a newspaper founded in 1995 based in Storm Lake, Iowa

== See also ==
- Narodnik, a trend of agrarian socialism in late Tsarist Russia
- Populist Party (disambiguation), groups worldwide
