= People's Democratic Party =

People's Democratic Party may refer to:

- People's Democratic Party of Afghanistan
- People's Democratic Party (Armenia)
- People's Democratic Party (Belize)
- People's Democratic Party (Bhutan)
- People's Democratic Party (Chile)
- People's Democratic Party (Dominican Republic)
- People's Democratic Party (Fiji)
- Peoples Democratic Party (India)
- People's Democratic Party (Indonesia)
- Peoples Democratic Party (Kenya)
- People's Democratic Party of Liberia
- People's Democratic Party (Macedonia)
- Peoples Democratic Party (Nigeria)
- People's Democratic Party (Serbia)
- People's Democratic Party (Sierra Leone)
- People's Democratic Party (South Korea)
- People's Democratic Party (Spain), 1982–1989
- People's Democratic Party (Spain, 1974)
- People's Democratic Party (Sudan)
- People's Democratic Party of Tajikistan
- People's Democratic Party (Taiwan)
- People's Democratic Party (Tonga)
- People's Democratic Party (Transnistria) or Proriv
- People's Democratic Party (Trinidad and Tobago)
- Peoples' Democratic Party (Turkey)
- People's Democratic Party (Ukraine)
- People's Democratic Party of Uzbekistan
- People's Democratic Party (Zimbabwe)
- Eelam People's Democratic Party, Sri Lanka
- Jammu and Kashmir People's Democratic Party, India

== See also ==
- Democratic People's Party (disambiguation)
- Democratic Party (disambiguation)
- People's Party (disambiguation)
- People's Democracy (disambiguation)
- People's Democratic Front (disambiguation)
- People's Democratic Movement (disambiguation)
- People's Democracy Party (disambiguation)
