= People's Democratic Front =

People's Democratic Front or Popular Democratic Front can refer to:

- People's Democratic Front (Burma)
- People's Democratic Front (Hyderabad), India
- People's Democratic Front (Indonesia)
- People's Democratic Front (Iran)
- People's Democratic Front (Meghalaya), India
- People's Democratic Front (Peru)
- People's Democratic Front (Romania)
- Popular Democratic Front (Italy)

== See also ==
- People's Democracy (disambiguation)
- People's Democratic Movement (disambiguation)
- People's Democracy Party (disambiguation)
- People's Democratic Party (disambiguation)
