= People's democracy (disambiguation) =

People's Democracy may refer to:

- People's democracy (Marxism–Leninism), an ideological concept conceived by communist parties in the aftermath of World War II
- People's Democracy (Ireland), a defunct political party in Northern Ireland
- People's Democracy (newspaper), weekly publication of the Communist Party of India (Marxist)
- People's Multiparty Democracy, the ideological line of the Nepal Communist Party
- Whole-process people's democracy, a concept conceived by the Chinese Communist Party

== See also ==
- People's republic
- People's Democratic Front (disambiguation)
- People's Democratic Movement (disambiguation)
- People's Democracy Party (disambiguation)
- People's Democratic Party (disambiguation)
