= Croatian Popular Party =

Croatian Popular Party (Croatian: Hrvatska pučka stranka, pronounced [xř̩ʋaːtskaː pûːt͡ʃka strâŋka]) may refer to:

- Croatian Popular Party (1997), a political party in Croatia
- Croatian Popular Party (1919), a political party in the Kingdom of Serbs, Croats and Slovenes

== See also ==
- Croatian People's Party (disambiguation)
