= Populist Party =

Populist Party may refer to:

== Asian and European political parties and movements ==
- Croatian Popular Party (1919), a Croatian right-wing party also known as Croatian Populist Party
- Indonesian National Populist Fortress Party, an Indonesian populist party supportive of Pancasila ideology
- Narodnik, a movement in late Tsarist Russia, whose name can be translated as "Populist" and whose ideology has been referenced as "Populism", in scholarly literature
- People's Party (Greece), a conservative-monarchist early 20th century Greek party, whose name can be translated as Populist Party
- People's Party (Spain), a conservative party in Spain
- Populist Party (France), a nationalist and eurosceptic organization in France
- Populist Party (Northern Cyprus), a defunct party in Northern Cyprus
- Populist Party (Turkey), a former social democratic Turkish political party translated both as People's Party and as Populist Party
- Social Democratic Populist Party (Turkey), a former social democratic Turkish political party
- Vietnam Populist Party, a pro-democracy party in Vietnam, called For The Vietnamese People Party by the state media

== North American political parties ==
- People's Party (United States) or Populist Party (1887–1908), a radical agrarian-oriented American political party
- People's Party (United States, 1971) (1973–1976), sometimes also called Populist Party; inspired by the People's Party of the 1887–1908 period
- Populist Party (United States, 1984) (1984–1996), a far-right political party
- Populist Party Ontario, a minor provincial political party in Ontario, Canada

== See also ==
- People's Party (disambiguation)
- Partido Popular (disambiguation)
