= People's Labour Party =

People's Labour Party may refer to:

- People's Labour Party (Cuba)
- People's Labour Party (Papua New Guinea)
- People's Labour Party (Saint Kitts and Nevis)
- People's Labour Party (Turkey)
- People's Labour Party (United Kingdom)

== See also ==
- Laboring People's Party, South Korea
- People's Party (disambiguation)
- Labour Party (disambiguation)
