= People's Unity Party =

People's Unity Party can refer to:

- People's Unity Party (Finland)
- People's Unity Party (Gabon)
- People's Unity Party (Papua New Guinea)
- People's Unity Party (Tajikistan)
- People's Unity Party (Tunisia)
- People's Unity Party – Socialist Party, a defunct political party in Iceland
- Samajik Ekta Party (India)

== See also ==
- Popular Unity Party (disambiguation)
