= People's Democratic Movement (disambiguation) =

The People's Democratic Movement may refer to:

- People's Democratic Movement (Chile)
- People's Democratic Movement (Dominica)
- People's Democratic Movement (Grenada)
- People's Democratic Movement (Guyana)
- People's Democratic Movement (Meghalaya), India
- People's Democratic Movement (Montserrat)
- People's Democratic Movement (Papua New Guinea)
- People's Democratic Movement (Turks and Caicos Islands)

== See also ==
- People's Democracy (disambiguation)
- People's Democratic Front (disambiguation)
- People's Democracy Party (disambiguation)
- People's Democratic Party (disambiguation)
