= British People's Party =

British People's Party may refer to the following parties in the United Kingdom:

- British People's Party (1939)
- British Democratic Party (British People's Party (1979))
- British People's Party (2005)
- British People's Party (2015)
