= Democratic Union =

Democratic Union may refer to:

- Croatian Democratic Union
- Croatian Democratic Union of Bosnia and Herzegovina
- Mongolian Democratic Union
- Democratic Union of Alto Adige
- Democratic Union (Argentina)
- Democratic Union (Bosnia and Herzegovina)
- Democratic Union (Czech Republic)
- Democratic Union (Germany)
- Democratic Union (Greece)
- Democratic Union (Guatemala)
- Democratic Union (Israel)
- Democratic Union (Italy)
- Democratic Union (Morocco)
- Democratic Union (North Macedonia)
- Democratic Union (Poland)
- Democratic Union (Russia)
- Democratic Union (Slovakia)
- Democratic Union (Ukraine)

== See also ==
- People's Democratic Union (disambiguation)
- Democratic Alliance (disambiguation)
- Democratic Party (disambiguation)
