= Danish People's Party (1993) =

Local political party in Odense, Denmark

The Danish People's Party was a small local-level political party in the Danish city of Odense, existing for a few months in 1993.

The founder of the party, Per Rosen Madsen, was a member of the Progress Party. Due to internal struggles he was excluded from the party in 1991. In 1993 he registered the Danish People's Party with the home office. The party received very few votes in the local elections of November 1993 and Per Rosen Madsen eventually gave up.

== See also ==
- Politics of Denmark
