= La Cala de Mijas =

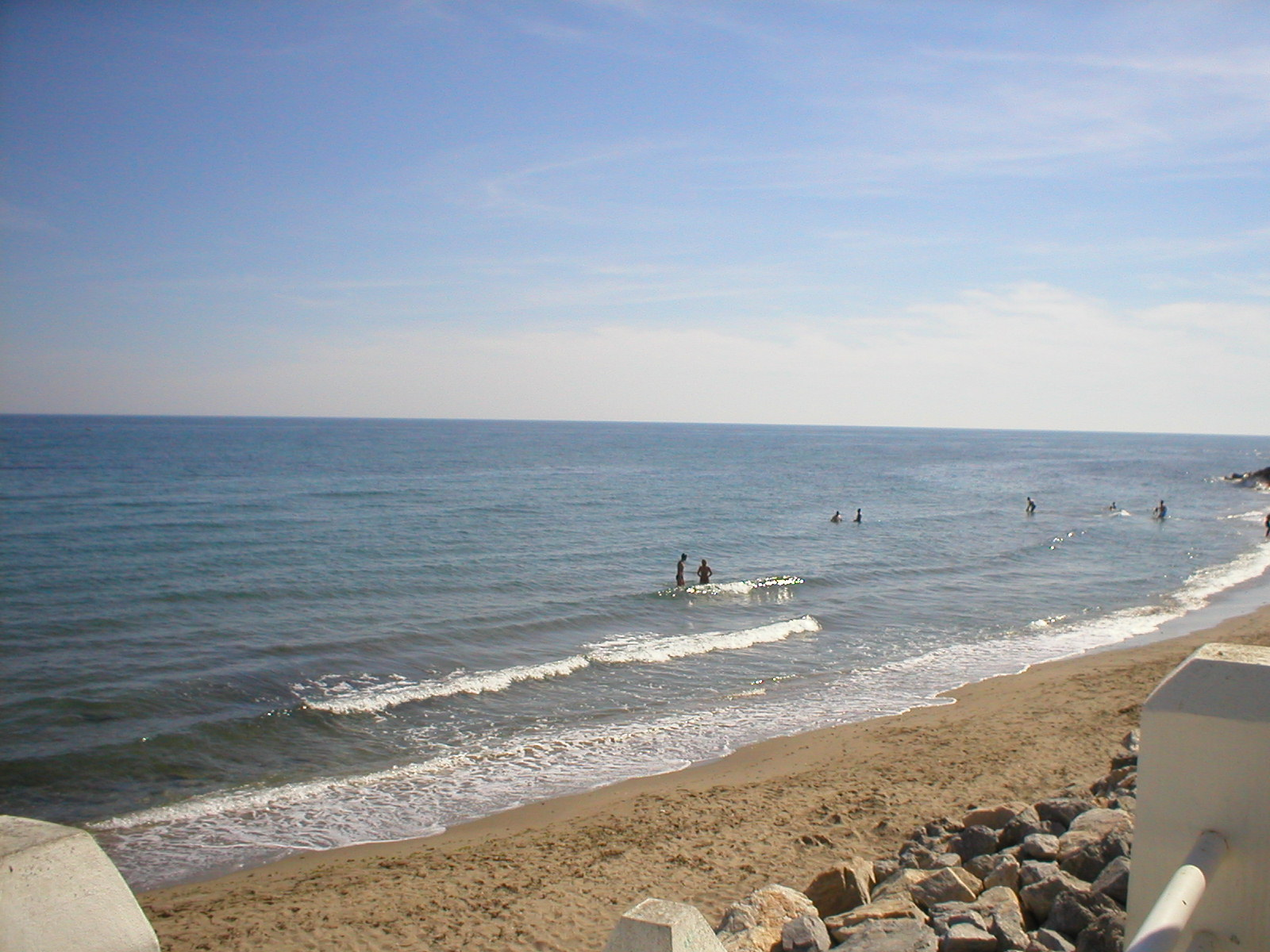

- Flag Seal

- Location in Spain.
- Coordinates: 36°30′17″N 4°40′49″W
- Comarca: Costa del Sol Occidental

Population (2018)
  - Total: 3,980
- Demonym: Mijeños
- Time zone: UTC+1 (CET)
  - Summer (DST): UTC+2 (CEST)
- Website: Official website

La Cala de Mijas (English: Mijas Bay) forms part of the Municipality of Mijas in the province of Málaga, Andalusia, southern Spain.

In the middle of the Costa del Sol, La Cala is located in the coastal zone of the municipality, and except for a few rocks is practically urbanized within a 12 kilometres (7.5 mi) radius. It sits between the limits of Fuengirola to the east, and Marbella to the west.

With a population of 4,000 inhabitants, the town is dedicated to tourism, but has some municipal services such as health centers, schools, house of culture and library.

Of ecological importance is the sea floor, which houses a rich biodiversity with the coexistence of a large number of European, African, Atlantic and Mediterranean species.

== History ==
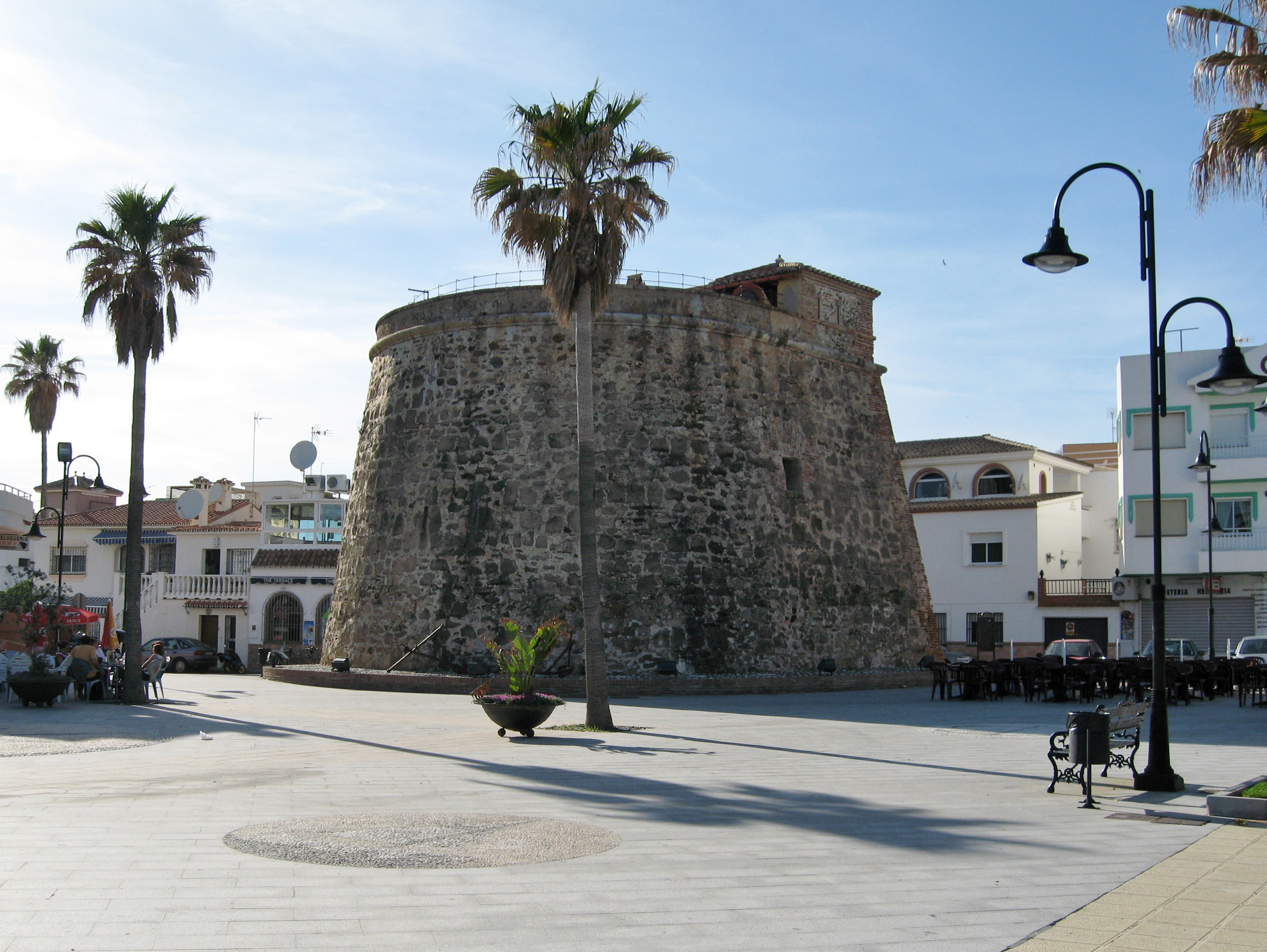
The castle tower at Mijas

La Cala de Mijas was an agricultural and small, typically Andalusian white-washed fishing village, until the beginning of the Spanish tourist boom in the 1960s.

Historically it has been a place of defence, fortified with four towers along the coast Mediterranean coast of Andalusia, whose function was to give notice of the presence of enemy ships to the garrisons of Fuengirola, Benalmádena and Marbella. This was one of the places where the Berbers attacked. The towers are:

- Torre de Calahonda (from the 16th century)
- New Tower of La Cala del Moral (probably the most modern tower along the coast, 19th century)
- Battery Torre La Cala del Moral (16th century)
- Calaburras Tower (built around 1515 in the Punta de Calaburras)

Known previously as "La Cala del Moral" (English: the Bay of Mulberries) due to the mulberry trees growing in the area, the name was changed in the 1970s to La Cala de Mijas in order to avoid confusion with the similarly named Cala del Moral just outside Málaga. In those early tourist days, La Cala boasted some 30 fishermen's cottages, a couple of bars, an open-air summer cinema, a butcher's, grocer's, a small chapel, a school and little else.

== Education ==
La Cala de Mijas is served by IES Torre Almenara, IES La Cala de Mijas, El Chaparral and Jardin Botanico.

== Transport ==
=== Bus ===
Buses from Fuengirola to Marbella and a bus service that loops from Myramar shopping centre both provide bus transport access to La Cala de Mijas

=== Car ===
The A-7 Highway Provides access to La Cala de Mijas from Marbella, Fuengirola, Benalmadena, Torremolinos, Málaga airport and Málaga city
