= British People's Party (2015) =

- Founded: December 2015
- Dissolved: November 2016
- Ideology: British nationalism British unionism Conservatism (British); Economic democracy Euroscepticism
- Political position: Centre-right

Website
- British People's Party

The British People's Party, officially registered as the British People's Party - Unity, Equality, Freedom, was a short-lived British political party that was registered with the Electoral Commission and launched in December 2015. It ceased to exist in 2016.

== Electoral performance ==
Ben Marshall, a member of the Pilsley Parish Council, joined the party the day after its launch to become its first councillor.

The party's first electoral contest was for a parish council by-election in Kintbury on 21 January 2016, winning 31 votes (8.2%).

The party unsuccessfully contested the North East Derbyshire District Council by-election in Tupton ward on 15 September 2016.
