= Mijas Pueblo =

Town in Andalusia, Spain

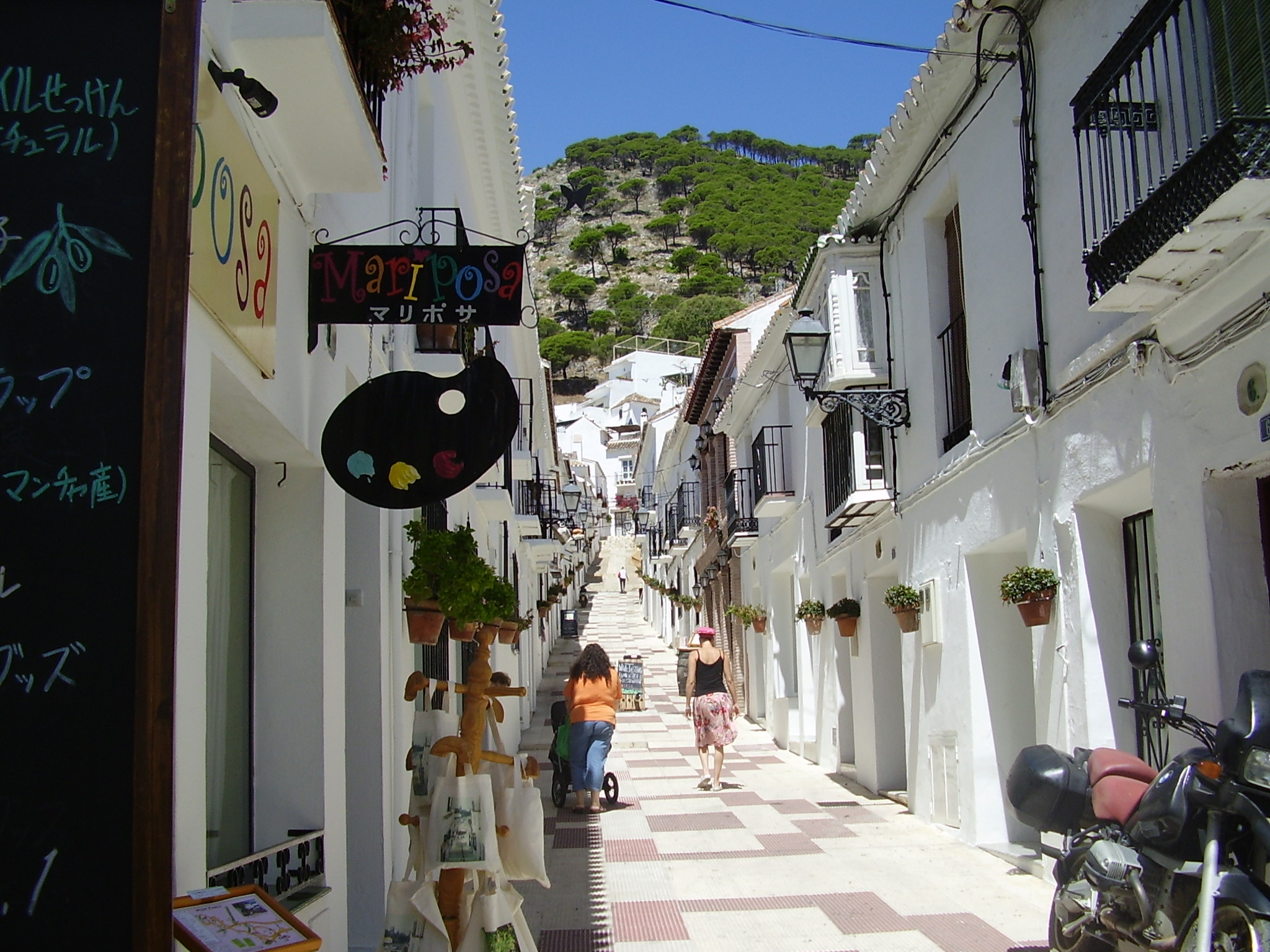
Mijas Pueblo

Mijas Pueblo is the historical core of the municipality of Mijas, situated in the heart of the Costa del Sol in southwestern Spain, on the hillside above the city of Fuengirola. It lies only 30 kilometres from Málaga Airport. It has a varied landscape that goes from the mountains all the way to the sea.

The area of Mijas is mostly mountainous with growing developments along the coast and on the gentler parts of the mountain slopes. The Pasadas and Ojen rivers cross this area, they join to form the Rio Fuengirola which flows into the sea almost on the limits between Fuengirola and Mijas.

The Municipality, one of the largest in the Province of Málaga, with 147 km^{2} is divided into three different urban areas: Mijas Pueblo, conserving the charm of a traditional Andalucian "white village", Las Lagunas on the coast (the most modern area of Mijas where you can find industrial and commercial areas), and La Cala, a small but rapidly expanding seaside village in the centre of the 12 kilometres of beaches on the Mijas coast.

Inhabited since ancient times, a small village Mijas was devoted mainly to agriculture and fisheries to the explosion of the tourist boom in the 1950s. Since then, tourism and construction sector have been the engines of local economy, triggering at the same time the population and per capita income, albeit at a high environmental cost. Today it is a multicultural city with a high percentage of residents of foreign origin and a major residential centers of tourism in Andalusia.

== Climate ==
The climate of Mijas, due to the proximity of the sea, usually features mild temperatures, with an average of 18 °C without heat in summer and little frost in winter. The rainfall is below 600ml per year, with the most rain between November and January. The town boasts some 2,920 hours of sunshine per year. As one ascends the mountains, the climate changes gradually. Temperatures can drop to 10 °C. In the peaks there may be some ice in winter, over 600 meters, while precipitation increases to almost 800ml.

== Gallery ==
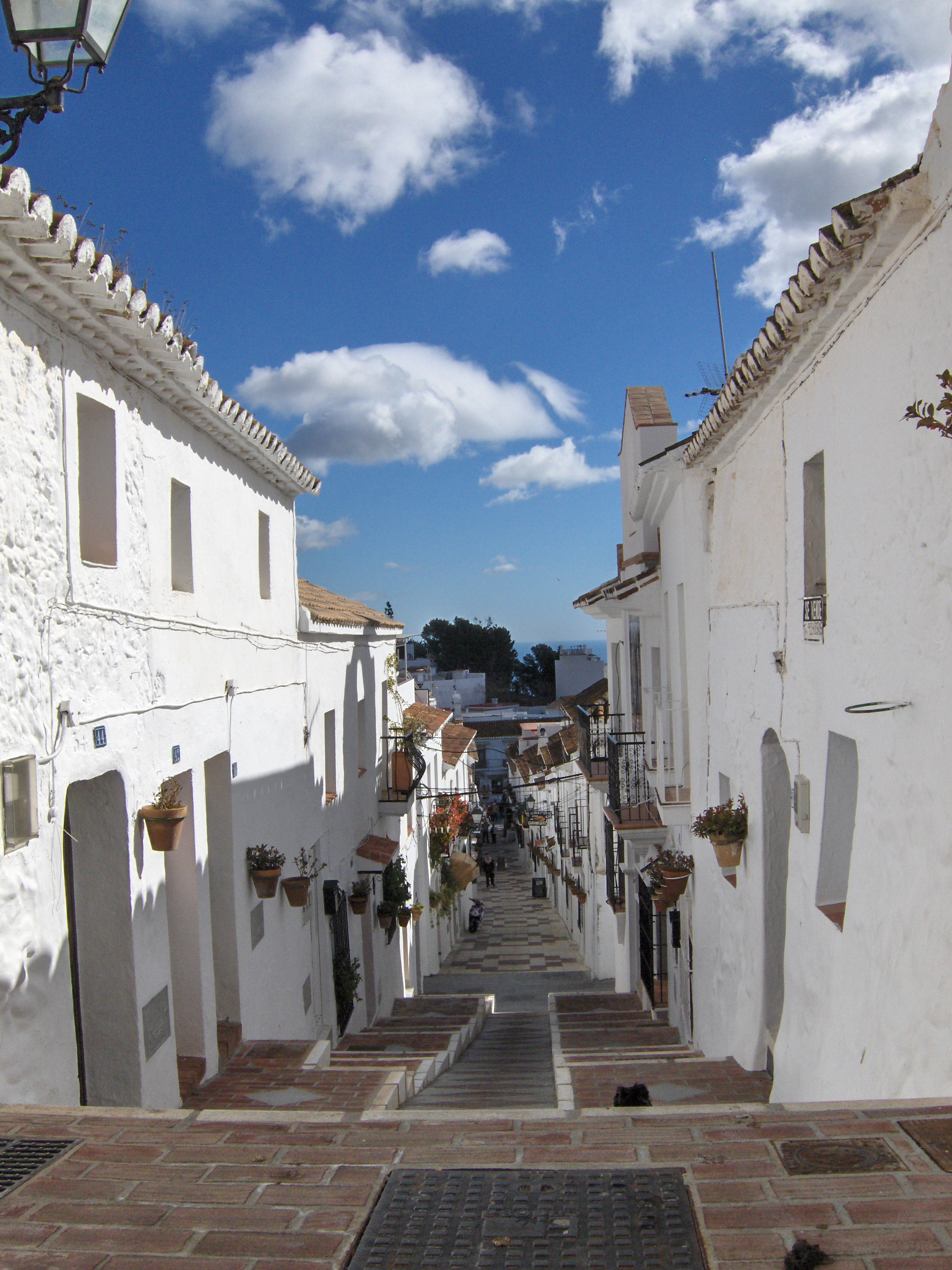
The view of Mijas Costa from Mijas Pubelo
Calle de San Sebastian

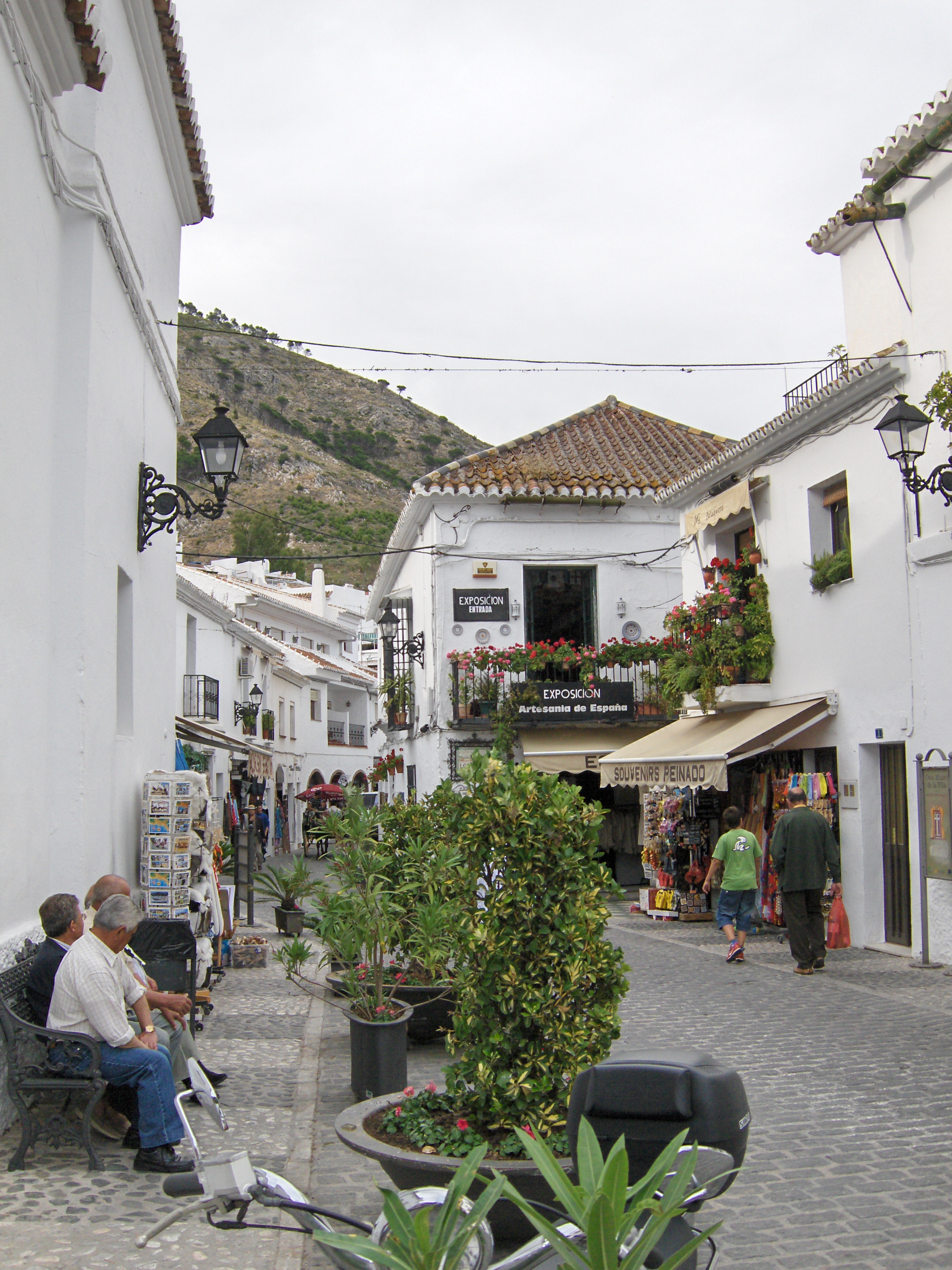
Plaza de la Libertad

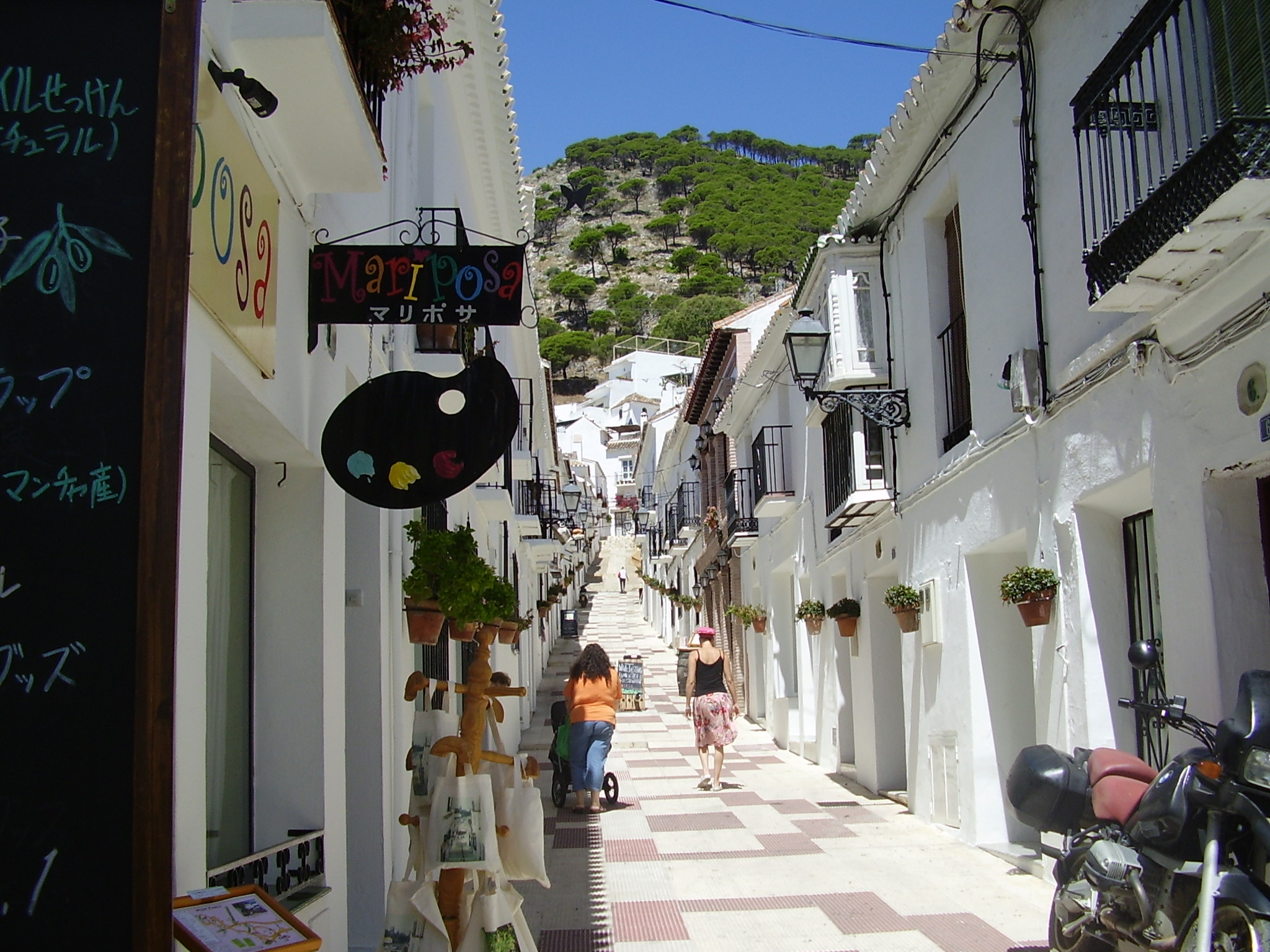
Street

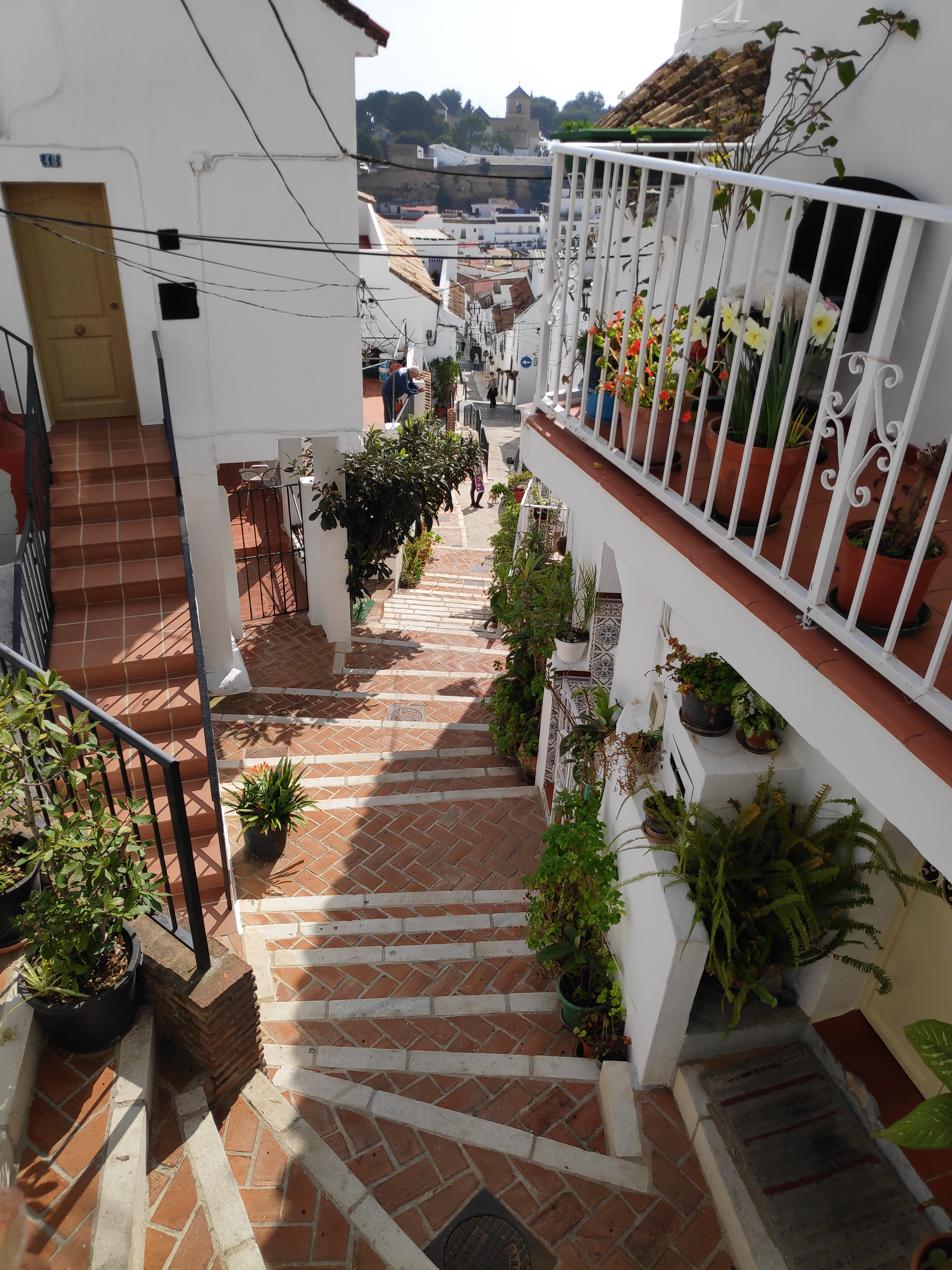
