= People's Party of Catalonia (1973) =

People's Party of Catalonia Partit Popular de Catalunya
- Secretary-General: Joan Colomines i Puig
- Founded: 1973
- Dissolved: 1 November 1976
- Split from: National Front of Catalonia
- Merged into: Socialist Party of Catalonia–Congress
- Newspaper: Nova Catalunya
- Ideology: Democratic socialism Catalan nationalism Antifascism; Workers' self-management
- Political position: Left-wing

People's Party of Catalonia (in Catalan: Partit Popular de Catalunya, PPC) was a political party in Catalonia, Spain. PPC was founded in 1973 as from a split of the National Front of Catalonia (FNC).

== History ==
Its secretary general was Joan Colomines i Puig. The party participated in the unitary organizations of the antifascist opposition in Catalonia, specially the Assembly of Catalonia. The first congress, and legal public act, of the party was celebrated in March 1976 in Barcelona.

In 1976 CSC merged with other groups and parties to form the Socialist Party of Catalonia–Congress.

== See also ==
- National Front of Catalonia
- Socialist Party of Catalonia–Congress
- List of political parties in Catalonia
