= People's Democratic United Front =

The People's Democratic United Front was a short-lived political coalition in Nepal, formed by the Communist Party of Nepal and the Nepal Praja Parishad in July 1951 to fight against the Rana-Nepali Congress combine. Tanka Prasad Acharya was the chairman of the front and Shailendra Kumar Upadhyaya the general secretary. Except for the two main political parties, constituents of the front included the Nepal Youth Association, the All Nepal Youth Association, All Nepal Workers Association, All Nepal Women's Association, All Nepal Students Federation, Progressive Study Group and Social Reform Association.
