= Danish People's Party (1941–1943) =

- Founded: March 1, 1941
- Ideology: Corporativism; Anti-communism

The Danish People's Party (Danish: Dansk Folkeparti) was a political party in Denmark during the German occupation in World War II.

== History ==
The Danish People's Party was formed on March 1, 1941 by former members of the Nazi DNSAP, as well as some politicians originally from the liberal Danmarks Retsforbund, National Cooperation, the Conservative People's Party and the Social Democratic Party. The party supported a corporativist state and was anti-communist.

The first leader of the party was Victor Pürschel, a former conservative MP and deputy spokesman. Wilfred Petersen quickly became the new leader of the party which was then influenced by his sympathies for Nazism and antisemitism. However, this caused Victor Pürschel and other leading members to leave the party during 1943. This reduced Danish People's Party to a historical footnote that was soon forgotten. After the war, some of its founders were convicted for unnational behaviour.

When the current Danish People's Party were founded in 1995, opponents drew attention to the fact that the name had been used in the past by a Nazi-friendly party. Representatives of the new Danish People's Party, however, rejected any connection with the wartime party, largely unknown by 1995, and said they regarded the coincidence as unimportant.

== See also ==
- Politics of Denmark
