= Democratic Popular Party =

Democratic Popular Party may refer to:-

- The Social Democratic Party (Portugal) formerly known as Democratic Popular Party
- The Popular Democratic Party of Puerto Rico
- The Democratic Popular Party (Spain)
- The Popular Democratic Party (France)
