= Popular National Party =

Popular National Party may refer to:

- Popular National Party (Quebec), Canada
- Popular National Party (Tanzania)
