= Popular Unity Party =

Popular Unity Party may refer to:

- Popular Unity (Greece)
- People's Unity Party – Socialist Party, Iceland
- Popular Unity Party (Iraq)
- Popular Unity Party (Portugal)
- Popular Unity Party (Tunisia)

== See also ==
- Popular Unity (disambiguation)
- People's Unity Party (disambiguation)
