= Mijas Costa =

Mijas Costa is the main commercial and residential zone of, although not limited to, Fuengirola.

== Overview ==
Covering 12 kilometers, Mijas Costa encompasses El Chaparral, La Cala, Riviera and Calahonda, from East to West respectively. The area is a large tourist hub due to the commercial centers, supermarkets, golf course, sports centers, bars and restaurants.

== See also ==
- Mijas
