= Popular Action Party =

Popular Action Party may refer to:

- Popular Action (Peru), a populist political party in Peru
- Popular Action Party (Panama), a Panamanian political party
