= Popular Democrat Party =

Popular Democrat Party may refer to:

- Popular Democratic Party (Puerto Rico) (Spanish: Partido Popular Democrático)
- Popular Democrats (Sweden) (Swedish: Folkdemokraterna)
- Popular Democrats (Italian: Democratici Popolari), Italy
- Democrat Party (Thailand) (Thai: พรรคประชาธิปัตย์, romanized: Phak Prachathipat)
