= Popular Democratic Party =

Popular Democratic Party may refer to:

- Popular Democratic Party (Dominican Republic)
- Popular Democratic Party (France)
- Popular Democratic Party (Lebanon)
- Popular Democratic Party of Moldova
- Popular Democratic Party (Puerto Rico)
- Popular Democratic Party (South Korea)
- Popular Democratic Party (Ukraine)
