= People's Democracy Party (South Korea) =

Political party in South Korea

People's Democracy Party 민중민주당
- Leader: Lee Sang-hoon
- Founded: 5 November 2016
- Headquarters: #1107 Le Meilleur Jongno Town, 19 Jongno, Jogno 1-ga Jongno-gu, Seoul
- Membership (2024): 9,871
- Ideology: Communism; Left-wing nationalism; Korean nationalism; Korean reunification; Anti-imperialism; Anti-militarism
- Political position: Far-left
- International affiliation: World Anti-Imperialist Platform; Sovintern
- National Assembly: 0 / 300

Website
- pdp21.kr

- People's Democracy Party
- Hangul: 민중민주당
- Hanja: 民衆民主黨
- Revised Romanization: Minjungminjudang
- McCune–Reischauer: Minjungminjudang

Abbreviation
- Hangul: 민중당
- Hanja: 民衆黨
- Revised Romanization: Minjungdang
- McCune–Reischauer: Minjungdang

The People's Democracy Party (Korean: 민중민주당) is a far-left political party in South Korea that advocates the establishment of a people's democracy, in which the proletariat owns the productive forces. The party has taken various anti-imperialist and anti-militarist positions, including the end of conscription in South Korea, the withdrawal of U.S. troops from South Korea, and the negotiation of a peace agreement with North Korea.

== History ==
The Founding Preparatory Committee of the Hwansu Welfare Party (환수복지당) was formed on 12 July 2016 and it held a press conference on 18 July. The inauguration ceremony of the Hwansu Welfare Party was subsequently held on 5 November 2016, and the party registered with the National Election Commission (NEC) on 21 November.

The Hwansu Welfare Party merged with organizations affiliated with the National Liberation and People's Democracy political camps on 15 August 2017. The party subsequently renamed itself to the People's Democracy Party-Hwansu Welfare Party (민중민주당-환수복지당), later shortened to the "People's Democracy Party".

== Ideology and policies ==
The People's Democracy Party aims to establish a people's democracy in South Korea, in which workers, farmers, and small merchants (i.e. the proletariat and petite bourgeoisie) are the owners of the productive forces. The party program calls for free housing, education, and medical care, as well as an end to conscription in South Korea. The party has been described as far-left in South Korean media.

=== Foreign policy ===
The party is opposed to the U.S. military presence in Asia, advocating for the departure of the United States Forces Korea and the suspension of "Foal Eagle" exercises between the U.S. and South Korea. The party has stated that "South Corea [sic] is a complete colony occupied by the U.S. military, is politically oppressed by the U.S., and is economically subordinate to imperialist countries, including the U.S.," and therefore "True peace is possible only without imperialism; the head of imperialism is the U.S." The party has also expressed opposition to the current government of Japan, calling it "militaristic" and "imperialist". The party advocates engagement with North Korea and has called for an end to the Korean conflict through an immediate inter-Korean peace deal. The party also advocates the reunification of Korea under a federal system, and opposes "reunification by absorption" (as West Germany had done with East Germany) or reunification through war. The party supports a "collective security system" in East Asia, with ultimate goal of peace in all of Asia.

The party is a member of the World Anti-Imperialist Platform. The party supports the Russian invasion of Ukraine, echoing the Russian government's claims of it being a campaign of "de-Nazification". The party has accused the U.S. and NATO of supporting "neo-Nazis" and "Banderites" in Ukraine to threaten Russia.

== Election results ==
=== Legislative elections ===
| Election | Constituency votes | Share of votes | Seats won | +/− | Outcome |
|---|---|---|---|---|---|
| 2020 | 63 | 0.00% | 0 / 300 | | No seats |
| 2024 | 290 | 0.00% | 0 / 300 | Steady | No seats |
