= People's Democratic Party (Armenia) =

Armenian political party

For Democratic Statehood Party Հանուն Ժողովրդավար Պետականության կուսակցություն
- Leader: Arsen Sargsyan
- Founded: 11 February 2024
- Headquarters: Yerevan, Armenia
- Ideology: Pro-Western; Pro-Europeanism
- National Assembly: 0 / 107

Website
- Website

The For Democratic Statehood Party (Armenian: Հանուն Ժողովրդավար Պետականության կուսակցություն, romanized: Zhoghovurdneri demokratakan kusakts’ut’yun), also known as the For Democratic Statehood Party (Armenian: Հանուն Ժողովրդավար Պետականության կուսակցություն, romanized: Hanun Zhoghovrdavar Petakanut’yan kusakts’ut’yun) and For Democratic Statehood Party, is an Armenian political party that is headquartered in Yerevan. It is led by Arsen Sargsyan.

== History ==
The party held its founding congress on 11 February 2024 in Yerevan. Arsen Sargsyan, the president of the "Aratta-Van" NGO, was elected as Chairman of the party. The party has no political representation within the National Assembly and currently acts as an extra-parliamentary force.

== Ideology ==
The party describes itself as pro-state, patriotic, and supports advancing Armenia's democracy and human rights. The party also supports the reunification of Artsakh with Armenia. In regards to foreign policy, the party identifies as Pro-Western and supports Armenia's membership in the European Union. On 22 August 2025, the party released a joint statement along with the European Party of Armenia calling on the government of Armenia to immediately submit the country's EU candidacy application.

== See also ==
- Programs of political parties in Armenia
