= People's Movement =

A popular movement is a type of group action also called a social movement.

People's Movement or Popular Movement may also refer to a number of political parties:

- Algerian Popular Movement (Mouvement Populaire Algérien, founded 2013)
- People's Movement for the Liberation of Angola (Movimento Popular de Libertação de Angola, MPLA, founded 1956)
- Barbuda People's Movement, Antigua and Barbuda (founded 1989)
- Argentina:
  - Catamarca Popular Movement (Movimiento Popular Catamarqueño, founded 1971)
  - Fueguian People's Movement (Movimiento Popular Fueguino, founded 1985)
  - Neuquén People's Movement (Movimiento Popular Neuquino, founded 1961)
- People's Electoral Movement (Aruba) (Movimiento Electoral di Pueblo, MEP, founded 1971)
- People's Progressive Movement (Barbados) (1956-1966)
- Cameroon People's Democratic Movement (CPDM, French: Rassemblement démocratique du Peuple Camerounais, RDPC, renamed 1985)
- People's Progressive Movement (Cayman Islands) (founded 2002)
- People's Movement against the EU, Denmark (Folkebevægelsen mod EU, founded 1972)
- People's Movement for Justice and Welfare, Denmark (Folkebevægelsen Ret- & Velfærd, founded 2006)
- Democratic People's Movement, Ecuador (Movimiento Popular Democrático, MPD, founded 1978
- Patriotic People's Movement (Finland) (Isänmaallinen kansanliike, IKL, 1932-1944)
- France:
  - Popular Republican Movement (Mouvement républicain populaire, MRP, 1944-1967)
  - Union for a Popular Movement (Union pour un mouvement populaire, UMP, 2002-2015)
- People's Labour Movement, Grenada
- India:
  - Loktantrik Morcha Himachal Pradesh
  - Loktantrik Morcha (Rajasthan)
  - Jana Andolan Party
- Popular Movement in Iraq (الحراك الشعبي في العراق / Ạlḥrạkạlsẖʿbyfyạlʿrạq, founded 2011)
- Popular Movement (Italy) (Movimento Popolare, 1975-1994)
- People's Movement (Ireland) (Gluaiseacht an Phobail)
- People's Movement of Kosovo (Lëvizja Popullore e Kosovës, LPK, 1982-2013)
- People's Movement of Kyrgyzstan (2004-2005)
- People's Movement (Lebanon) (حركة الشعب / Harakat-el-shaab, founded 2000)
- People's Progressive Movement (Malawi)
- Malaysian People's Movement Party, Malaysia (Parti Gerakan Rakyat Malaysia, founded 1968)
- Popular Movement (Morocco) (Arabic: الحركة الشعبية / Al-Haraka Al-Sha'biya, French: Mouvement populaire, founded 1957)
- two multi-party movements in Nepal:
  - People's Movement I (1990) (जनआन्दोलन / Jana Andolan)
  - 2006 democracy movement in Nepal, also known as People's Movement II or Jana Andolan II
- People's Movement (New Zealand) (1930s-1940s)
- People's Democratic Movement, Papua New Guinea (founded 1985)
- People's Movement Party, Romania (Mișcarea Populară, MP, founded 2013)
- People's Movement for the State, political movement in Serbia
- Trinidad and Tobago:
  - People's National Movement (founded 1955)
    - Tobago Council of the People's National Movement (founded 1998)
  - People's Popular Movement (1986)
- People's Movement (Tunisia), founded 2011
- People's Movement of Ukraine (Народний Рух України / Narodnyi Rukh Ukrajiny, founded 1990)
- Popular Movement (Uzbekistan), or Unity (Birlik, founded 1989)

== See also ==
- People's Party (disambiguation)
