= Popular Democratic Union =

Popular Democratic Union may refer to:

- Popular Democratic Union (Ecuador)
- Popular Democratic Union (El Salvador)
- Popular Democratic Union (Portugal)
- Popular Democratic Union (Yemen)
- People's Democratic Union (disambiguation)

See also

- Popular Democratic Unity, a former political front in Peru.
- Democratic and Popular Union, a former political party in Bolivia.
