= Croatian People's Party =

Croatian People's Party may refer to:

- Croatian People's Party (1990), a political party in Croatia, named so between 1990 and 2005 when it was renamed to include the suffix Liberal Democrats
- People's Party (Kingdom of Croatia), a political party in Austria-Hungary between 1841 and 1918
- People's Party (Dalmatia), a political party in Austria-Hungary between 1861 and 1905
- Croatian People's Party (1919), a political party in the Kingdom of Serbs, Croats and Slovenes between 1841 and 1929
