= Popular Unity =

Popular Unity may refer to:

Alphabetical by country

- Popular Unity (Argentina), a left-wing nationalist party founded in 2010
- Popular Unity (Brazil), a left-wing party founded in 2016
- Popular Unity (Chile), a left-wing political alliance that supported Salvador Allende in 1970
- Popular Unity (Ecuador), a left-wing party founded in 2014
- Popular Unity (Greece), a left-wing parliamentary group founded in 2015
- Popular Unity (Italy), a minor social-democratic party 1953–1957
- Popular Unity (Montenegro), a political alliance 1996–1998
- Popular Unity (Poland), an agrarian party in 1923 and 1926
- Popular Unity Candidacy, a left-wing and pro-Catalan independence party in Spain, founded in 1986
- Popular Unity (Spain), a left-wing party 2015–2016
- Popular Unity Movement, a socialist party in Tunisia founded in 1973
- Popular Unity (Uruguay), a left-wing political alliance founded in 2013

== See also ==
- Popular Unity Party (disambiguation)
