= Partido Popular =

Partido Popular may refer to:

- People's Party (Panama)
- People's Party (Spain, 1976), dissolved in 1977
- People's Party (Spain), founded in 1989
- The original name of the Popular Socialist Party (Mexico)
- Partido Popular Democrata, original name of the Social Democratic Party (Portugal)
