= A Little Bit (disambiguation) =

"A Little Bit" is a song by Jessica Simpson from her 2001 album Irresistible, later covered by Rosie Ribbons.

A Little Bit may also refer to:

- "A Little Bit" (Pandora song), a song by Pandora from her 1997 album Changes
- "A Little Bit", a song by A-ha from their 2002 album Lifelines
- "A Little Bit", a song by Jay Chou from his 2016 album Jay Chou's Bedtime Stories
- "A Little Bit", a song by MYMP from their 2003 album Soulful Acoustic
- "A Little Bit", a song by Nina Åström, the Finnish entry in the Eurovision Song Contest 2000

== See also ==
- "Give a Little Bit", a 1977 song by Supertramp
- "Little Bit", a 2007 song by Lykke Li
- Little Bit..., a 1993 EP by Wands
- Lil Bit (disambiguation)
- "A Little Bit More", a 1973 song by Bobby Gosh
