= Shouldn't Be =

Single by Jay Chou and A-Mei

from the album Jay Chou's Bedtime Stories
- Released: June 17, 2016
- Recorded: 2016
- Genre: Pop
- Length: 4:50
- Label: JVR Music
- Songwriter(s): Vincent Fang
- Producer(s): Jay Chou

Jay Chou singles chronology
"Rhythm of the Rain" (2015)	"Shouldn't Be" (2016)	"Failure at Love" (2016)

A-Mei singles chronology
"A Bloody Love Story" (2015)	"Shouldn't Be" (2016)	"Story Thief" (2017)

Music video
- "Shouldn't Be" on YouTube

"Shouldn't Be" (Chinese: 不該; Bù Gāi) is a song by Taiwanese recording artists Jay Chou and A-Mei. It was first released on June 17, 2016, for digital consumption as the lead single for Chou's fourteenth studio album, Jay Chou's Bedtime Stories (2016), under JVR Music. The duet was written by Chou's frequent collaborator Vincent Fang, whilst production was handled by Chou. "Shouldn't Be" serves as the opening theme for the Chinese television drama Ice Fantasy (2016), which was broadcast by Hunan Broadcasting System. The song was included on the drama's official soundtrack.

Musically, "Shouldn't Be" is a pop ballad that incorporates the use of synthesizers in the post-chorus. Its production utilizes instrumentations of the piano, violin, and drums, while its lyrical content discusses pain associated with lost love and the separation of lovers. The song received positive reviews from music critics, who praised the vocal performance of both singers as well as the production of the track.

Commercially, the song charted at number 19 on the Singapore Regional chart in 2018. An accompanying music video for "Shouldn't Be" features actor Edison Huang cloning himself in an attempt to remain with his lover, while Chou and A-Mei sing the track amid a futuristic set. During Chou's The Invincible World Tour in October 2017, A-Mei and Chou delivered a performance of the song; A-Mei surprised the audience by appearing at Chou's final show in Taipei, where both artists performed "Shouldn't Be".

== Background and release ==
"Shouldn't Be"
A 25-second sample of "Shouldn't Be", showcasing the song's production and the singers' vocals.

Jay Chou and A-Mei have previously expressed interest in working with each other for years, as both artists have crossed paths numerous times at different concerts and events. Despite their frequent joint performances, Chou felt that their collaborations were limited to these events. This led him to create the song "Shouldn't Be", a special homage to their friendship. While composing the duet, Chou paid particular attention to ensuring the compatibility of both artists' vocal ranges. He also aimed for the melody to build up to a powerful crescendo.

== Music video ==
The music video of the song features actor Edison Huang as the lead character, with Chou and A-Mei performing the song on a futuristic set throughout the video. Talking about the filming process, A-Mei commented, "When I was shooting from the back, I wanted to tease Jay Chou. I wanted to make a face or something, but when I saw how devoted he was, so I couldn't bear to make a face!" Jay Chou also expressed similar remarks, saying that they were both too serious and devoted, so he eventually gave up.

The narrative of the music video sees the male lead cloning himself. He reminisces about the romantic moments he shared with the female lead. After his death, the heartbroken woman attempts to find love again. However, when the clone of the male lead reappears, he discovers that his lover has already moved on, is married, and has children.

== Accolades ==
At the Global Chinese Golden Chart Awards, "Shouldn't Be" was named one of the Top 20 Songs of the Year.

== Charts ==
=== Weekly charts ===
Chart performance for "Shouldn't Be"
Chart (2016–2018)	Peak position
China Airplay (Billboard Radio China)	2
Singapore Regional (RIAS)	19

== Release history ==
Region	Date	Format	Label	Ref.
Various	June 17, 2016	Digital download; streaming	JVR Music	
