= The Invincible World Tour =

2016–19 concert tour by Jay Chou

- Tour by Jay Chou
- Location: Asia; Europe; Oceania; North America
- Associated album: Jay Chou's Bedtime Stories
- Start date: June 30, 2016
- End date: May 2, 2019
- No. of shows: 120
- Attendance: 3,000,000

Jay Chou concert chronology
- Opus Jay World Tour (2013–15); The Invincible World Tour (2016–19); Carnival World Tour (2019–25)

The Invincible World Tour (Chinese: 地表最強世界巡迴演唱會) was the seventh concert tour by Taiwanese recording artist Jay Chou, held in support of his fourteenth studio album Jay Chou's Bedtime Stories (2016). The tour began in Shanghai at the Mercedes-Benz Arena on June 30, 2016, and spanned 120 dates in various countries including China, Malaysia, Singapore, United Kingdom, Taiwan, Australia, the United States, and France. The tour attracted an estimated total of 3 million people.

== Production ==
The Invincible World Tour in Taipei saw upgraded outfits, visual and special effects, and stage props. The concert was divided into eight thematic sections, each offering a different experience. The total production cost surpassed NT$180 million, making it the most expensive concert held by Chou up to that point.

A live album of the tour was released in November 2019.

== Commercial performance ==
Pollstar ranked Chou's June 2018 Shanghai concert at number 36 in their annual top 100 international box office report, with an attendance of 43,769 people and $9,381,304 in revenue.

== Controversies ==
Chou's concert in Singapore on September 3, 2016, faced several controversies, including poor sound quality. Attendees seated close to the stage reported difficulty discerning the vocals of the singer at certain points during the concert, attributing this to the overpowering bass and excessive reverb. In addition, allegations were made regarding inadequate ventilation and crowd management.

== Set list ==
Setlist

Main set

1. Hero
2. Nunchucks
3. I Find It Hard to Say
4. Bedtime Stories
5. Nocturne
6. In the Name of Father
7. Sailor Afraid of Water
8. Mermaid / Fun Fair
9. Wu Ding
10. Tornado
11. Ukulele
12. Silence
13. Diary: Fly for Love
14. Maple Leaf + A Step Back + Step Aside
15. Dad, I'm Home
16. Extra Large Shoes
17. Peninsula Ironbox
18. Magician
19. Starry Mood / Romantic Cellphone / Superman Can't Fly / Back to the Past
20. Sunshine Geek

Encore:

1. Nocturne
2. Now You See Me
3. Love Confession

Double encore:

1. Simple Love
2. Let's Go
3. Waiting For You
4. Blue and White Porcelain
5. Rice Field
6. Handwritten Past
7. Silence
8. Love Confession
9. Sunny Day
10. Common Jasmine Orange

== Tour dates ==
List of 2016 concert dates
Date (2016)	City	Country	Venue	Attendance
June 30	Shanghai	China	Mercedes-Benz Arena	44,000
July 1	Shanghai	China	Mercedes-Benz Arena	44,000
July 2	Shanghai	China	Mercedes-Benz Arena	44,000
July 3	Shanghai	China	Mercedes-Benz Arena	44,000
July 8	Beijing	China	LeSports Center	—
July 9	Beijing	China	LeSports Center	—
July 10	Beijing	China	LeSports Center	—
July 22	Guangzhou	China	Guangzhou International Sports Arena	—
July 23	Guangzhou	China	Guangzhou International Sports Arena	—
July 24	Guangzhou	China	Guangzhou International Sports Arena	—
August 6	Kuala Lumpur	Malaysia	Stadium Merdeka	—
August 27	Dalian	China	Dalian Sports Centre Stadium	—
September 3	Singapore		National Stadium	40,000
September 16	Qingdao	China	Yizhong Sports Center	—
September 24	Zhengzhou	China	Henan Province Sports Centre	—
September 30	Taiyuan	China	Shanxi Sports Stadium	—
October 15	Changzhou	China	Changzhou Olympic Sports Centre Stadium	—
October 22	Hefei	China	Hefei Olympic Sports Centre Stadium	—
November 5	Fuzhou	China	Fuzhou Olympic Sports Centre Stadium	—
November 12	Nantong	China	Nantong Sports Conference and Exhibition Center	—
November 18	Changsha	China	Helong Sports Center Stadium	—
November 19	Changsha	China	Helong Sports Center Stadium	—
November 26	Jiaxing	China	Jiaxing Sports Centre Stadium	—
December 10	Nanning	China	Guangxi Sports Centre Stadium	—
December 17	Huizhou	China	Huizhou Olympic Stadium	—

List of 2017 concert dates
Date (2017)	City	Country	Venue	Attendance
January 8	Hong Kong		Hong Kong Coliseum	90,000
January 9	Hong Kong		Hong Kong Coliseum	90,000
January 10	Hong Kong		Hong Kong Coliseum	90,000
January 11	Hong Kong		Hong Kong Coliseum	90,000
January 13	Hong Kong		Hong Kong Coliseum	90,000
January 14	Hong Kong		Hong Kong Coliseum	90,000
January 15	Hong Kong		Hong Kong Coliseum	90,000
January 16	Hong Kong		Hong Kong Coliseum	90,000
January 17	Hong Kong		Hong Kong Coliseum	90,000
March 17	London	England	Wembley Arena	12,500
March 18	London	England	Wembley Arena	12,500
April 7	Shenzhen	China	Shenzhen Stadium	—
April 8	Shenzhen	China	Shenzhen Stadium	—
April 15	Kunming	China	Kunming Tuodong Sports Centre Stadium	—
April 16	Kunming	China	Kunming Tuodong Sports Centre Stadium	—
April 22	Nanning	China	Guangxi Sports Centre Stadium	—
April 29	Xi'an	China	Shaanxi Province Stadium	—
April 30	Xi'an	China	Shaanxi Province Stadium	—
May 13	Chongqing	China	Chongqing Olympic Sports Center	80,000
May 14	Chongqing	China	Chongqing Olympic Sports Center	80,000
May 20	Nanjing	China	Nanjing Olympic Sports Centre Stadium	—
May 21	Nanjing	China	Nanjing Olympic Sports Centre Stadium	—
May 26	Tianjin	China	Tianjin Olympic Center Stadium	—
May 27	Tianjin	China	Tianjin Olympic Center Stadium	—
June 2	Shenyang	China	Shenyang Olympic Sports Centre Stadium	—
June 3	Shenyang	China	Shenyang Olympic Sports Centre Stadium	—
August 25	Beijing	China	Workers' Stadium	100,000
August 26	Beijing	China	Workers' Stadium	100,000
September 2	Jinan	China	Jinan Olympic Sports Centre Stadium	—
September 9	Taizhou	China	Taizhou Sports Centre Stadium	—
September 16	Suzhou	China	Suzhou Sports Center	—
September 28	Taipei	Taiwan	Taipei Arena	44,000
September 29	Taipei	Taiwan	Taipei Arena	44,000
September 30	Taipei	Taiwan	Taipei Arena	44,000
October 1	Taipei	Taiwan	Taipei Arena	44,000
October 14	Nanchang	China	Jiangxi Olympic Sports Center Stadium	—
October 21	Xiamen	China	Xiamen People's Stadium	—
October 22	Xiamen	China	Xiamen People's Stadium	—
October 28	Hangzhou	China	Yellow Dragon Sports Centre Stadium	—
October 29	Hangzhou	China	Yellow Dragon Sports Centre Stadium	—
December 2	Foshan	China	Century Lotus Stadium	—
December 3	Foshan	China	Century Lotus Stadium	—

List of 2018 concert dates
Date (2018)	City	Country	Venue	Attendance
January 6	Singapore		National Stadium	40,000
January 27	Kuala Lumpur	Malaysia	Stadium Merdeka	—
March 15	Hong Kong		Hong Kong Coliseum	—
March 16	Hong Kong		Hong Kong Coliseum	—
March 17	Hong Kong		Hong Kong Coliseum	—
March 18	Hong Kong		Hong Kong Coliseum	—
March 19	Hong Kong		Hong Kong Coliseum	—
March 21	Hong Kong		Hong Kong Coliseum	—
March 22	Hong Kong		Hong Kong Coliseum	—
March 23	Hong Kong		Hong Kong Coliseum	—
March 24	Hong Kong		Hong Kong Coliseum	—
March 25	Hong Kong		Hong Kong Coliseum	—
April 7	Sydney	Australia	Qudos Bank Arena	10,261
April 21	Zhuhai	China	Zhuhai Stadium	60,000
April 22	Zhuhai	China	Zhuhai Stadium	60,000
May 1	Chengdu	China	China Modern Pentathlon Games Center	—
May 2	Chengdu	China	China Modern Pentathlon Games Center	—
May 11	Changsha	China	Helong Sports and Culture Center Stadium	—
May 12	Changsha	China	Helong Sports and Culture Center Stadium	—
May 19	Jinhua	China	Jinhua Stadium	—
May 26	Changzhou	China	Changzhou Olympic Sports Center Stadium	—
May 27	Changzhou	China	Changzhou Olympic Sports Center Stadium	—
June 15	Shanghai	China	Mercedes-Benz Arena	43,769
June 16	Shanghai	China	Mercedes-Benz Arena	43,769
June 17	Shanghai	China	Mercedes-Benz Arena	43,769
June 18	Shanghai	China	Mercedes-Benz Arena	43,769
June 23	Fuzhou	China	Fuzhou Olympic Sports Centre Stadium	—
June 24	Fuzhou	China	Fuzhou Olympic Sports Centre Stadium	—
July 7	Zhengzhou	China	Henan Provincial Stadium	—
July 8	Zhengzhou	China	Henan Provincial Stadium	—
July 14	Dalian	China	Dalian Sports Center Stadium	—
July 15	Dalian	China	Dalian Sports Center Stadium	—
July 28	Xuzhou	China	Xuzhou Olympic Sports Center Stadium	—
August 23	Qingdao	China	Conson Stadium	—
August 24	Qingdao	China	Conson Stadium	—
September 1	Taiyuan	China	Shanxi Sports Centre Stadium	—
September 2	Taiyuan	China	Shanxi Sports Centre Stadium	—
September 29	Luoyang	China	Luoyang Stadium	—
September 30	Luoyang	China	Luoyang Stadium	—
October 20	Shaoxing	China	Shaoxing China Textile City Sports Center	—
October 21	Shaoxing	China	Shaoxing China Textile City Sports Center	—
October 27	Quanzhou	China	Quanzhou Sports Center	—
October 28	Quanzhou	China	Quanzhou Sports Center	—
November 17	Guiyang	China	Guiyang Olympic Sports Center	—
November 18	Guiyang	China	Guiyang Olympic Sports Center	—
December 14	Macau		Cotai Arena	—
December 15	Macau		Cotai Arena	—
December 16	Macau		Cotai Arena	—
December 17	Macau		Cotai Arena	—

List of 2019 concert dates
Date (2019)	City	Country	Venue	Attendance
February 9	Las Vegas	United States	MGM Grand Garden Arena	—
February 10	Las Vegas	United States	MGM Grand Garden Arena	—
April 26	London	England	The O2 Arena	21,726
April 27	London	England	The O2 Arena	21,726
May 2	Paris	France	Accor Arena	8,100
Total				3,000,000

== Live album ==
The Invincible Concert Tour

Live album by Jay Chou
- Released: November 1, 2019
- Genre: Mandopop
- Language: Mandarin
- Label: JVR

Jay Chou chronology
Jay Chou's Bedtime Stories (2016)	The Invincible Concert Tour (2019)	Greatest Works of Art (2022)

The Invincible Concert Tour (traditional Chinese: 地表最強世界巡迴演唱會; simplified Chinese: 地表最强世界巡回演唱会) is the sixth live album by Taiwanese singer Jay Chou, released on November 1, 2019, by JVR Music.

=== Track listing ===
DVD

1. "Opening" / "Hero" (英雄)
2. "Nunchucks" (雙截棍)
3. "I Find It Hard To Say" (開不了口)
4. "Bedtime Stories" (床邊故事) featuring Devon Song & Gary Yang
5. "Ye Qu" (夜曲) / "Stolen Love" (竊愛)
6. "In The Name of Father" (以父之名)
7. "Mermaid" (美人魚)
8. "I Want Summer" (我要夏天) featuring Patrick Brasca
9. "My Time" (我的時代) performed by Patrick Brasca
10. "Sunny Day" (晴天)
11. "Rice Field" (稻香)
12. "Blue and White Porcelain" (青花瓷)
13. "Diary of Love" (愛的飛行日記) performed by Gary Yang
14. "Maple Leaf" (楓) / "A Step Back" (退後) / "Step Aside" (擱淺) performed by Devon Song
15. "Dad, I'm home" (爸，我回來了)
16. "Extra Large Shoes" (鞋子特大號)
17. "Peninsula Ironbox" (半島鐵盒)
18. "Ancient Indian Turtledove" (印第安老斑鳩)
19. "Big Ben" (大笨鐘) / "Secret Sign" (暗號) / "Rainbow" (彩虹) / "Tornado" (龍捲風)
20. "Tu Er Qi Ice Cream" (土耳其冰淇淋)
21. "How You See Me" featuring Mai Zheng-wei
22. "Love Confession" (告白氣球)
23. "Grandpa's Tea" (爺爺泡的茶) featuring Patrick Brasca, Devon Song, Gary Yang, Mai Zheng-wei
24. "Qi Li Xiang" (七里香) featuring Patrick Brasca, Devon Song, Gary Yang, Mai Zheng-wei
25. "Let's Go" (説走就走) featuring Patrick Brasca, Devon Song, Gary Yang, Mai Zheng-wei
