= Love Confession =

- Title card

Single by Jay Chou

from the album Jay Chou's Bedtime Stories
- Released: October 28, 2016
- Recorded: 2016
- Genre: Pop; R&B
- Length: 3:36
- Label: JVR Music
- Songwriter: Vincent Fang
- Producer: Jay Chou

Jay Chou singles chronology
| "Failure at Love" (2016) | "Love Confession" (2016) | "Waiting for You" (2018) |

Music video
- "Love Confession" on YouTube

"Love Confession" (Chinese: 告白氣球; Gàobái qìqiú; lit. Confession balloon) is a song by Taiwanese recording artist Jay Chou, released for his fourteenth studio album, Jay Chou's Bedtime Stories (2016), under JVR Music. Its music video was released on October 28, 2016. Self-produced by Chou, the song was written his frequent collaborator Vincent Fang. Musically, it is a pop and R&B song with lyrics containing themes of romance.

The song received positive reviews from music critics, who praised Chou's vocal performance and the song's composition. It stayed at number one position on the Billboard Radio China Top 10 chart in China for nine non-consecutive weeks, and re-charted at number five on the Malaysia Chinese chart compiled by the Recording Industry Association of Malaysia (RIM). It was named one of the Top Ten Golden Songs Award by Billboard Radio China for its success in the country.

An accompanying music video for "Love Confession" was filmed in Paris and features Patrick Brasca. It is the second most-viewed Chinese music video on YouTube, with over 265 million views. Chou has performed the song on several of his world tours, including the Invincible World Tour and the Carnival World Tour.

== Background and composition ==
"Love Confession"
"Love Confession" is a pop and R&B song with lyrics containing themes of love and romance.

Chou drew inspiration for "Love Confession" from the landscapes of France, and wanted to evoke the feelings of a first love. He aimed to create a work similar to "Simple Love" from his 2001 album Fantasy. Chou commented, "Because I rarely write works like 'Simple Love', I wanted to test the waters and see how people react. It seems that I haven't been able to write this kind of song for a long time. I used to write a lot of sad songs."

"Love Confession" opens with R&B elements written to reflect the excitement of falling in love. Vincent Fang used balloons to symbolize the lightheartedness of girls expressing that they are difficult to win over. During the creative process, Chou commented that "Love Confession" was the simplest and easiest to write in the album.

== Music video ==
The music video for "Love Confession" was filmed in Paris, France, and features Chou strolling along the Seine River. It features Patrick Brasca in the leading role. Initially designed for a Christmas-themed atmosphere in Paris, the production team later re-designed the video set to evoke the warmth of the sunset and afternoon tea time. It became the first video by a Taiwanese male artist to reach 200 million views on YouTube, and remains the second most-viewed video by a Sinophone artist on the platform to date.

== Live performances ==
Jiang Jinfu and Chen Yaan covered "Love Confession" at the Hunan Satellite TV Lantern Festival Gala on February 11, 2017. Chou made a performance of the song at the CCTV Spring Festival Gala on February 15, 2018.

== Charts ==
=== Weekly charts ===
| Chart (2016–2022) | Peak position |
|---|---|
| China Airplay (Billboard Radio China) | 1 |
| Malaysia Chinese Chart (RIM) | 5 |

=== Year-end charts ===
| Chart (2016) | Position |
|---|---|
| China Airplay (Billboard Radio China) | 6 |
