= Just a Little Bit =

Just a Little Bit may refer to:

- "Just a Little Bit" (Blue Cheer song)
- "Just a Little Bit" (Kids of 88 song)
- "Just a Little Bit" (Mutya Buena song)
- "Just a Little Bit" (Rosco Gordon song), recorded by many artists
- "Just a Lil Bit", a song by 50 Cent
- "Just a Little Bit", a song by Christina Milian from So Amazin'
- "Just a Little Bit", a song by Magnum from Sleepwalking
- "Just a Little Bit", a song by Maria Mena from Mellow
- "Just a Little Bit", a song by Stone Roses from Garage Flower
- "I Want Your Lovin' (Just a Little Bit)", a song by Curtis Hairston
- "Wiggle It (Just A Little Bit)", a song by 2 in a Room
- Just a Little Bit, a series of romance novels by Eileen Wilks

== See also ==
- Lil Bit (disambiguation)
- "Ooh Aah... Just a Little Bit", a song by Gina G
- Just a Little (disambiguation)
- "A Little Bit", a song by Jessica Simpson
