= Lil Bit (disambiguation) =

"Lil Bit" is a song by American hip hop artist Nelly with country duo Florida Georgia Line.

Lil Bit may also refer to:

- "Lil Bit", a song by Blackbear
- "Lil Bit", a song by K Camp
- "Lil Bit", a song by Peking Duk and Tommy Trash

== See also ==
- Lil Bitts, Trinidadian musician
- "Little Bit", 2008 song by Lykke Li
- A Little Bit (disambiguation)
- Just a Little Bit (disambiguation)
