= Just a Little =

Just a Little may refer to:

- "Just a Little" (The Beau Brummels song), 1965
- "Just a Little" (Liberty X song), 2002
- "Just a Little", a song by Stray Kids from Hollow, 2025

== See also ==
- Just a Little Bit (disambiguation)
