= Jay Chou =

Taiwanese singer-songwriter (born 1979)

- 周杰倫
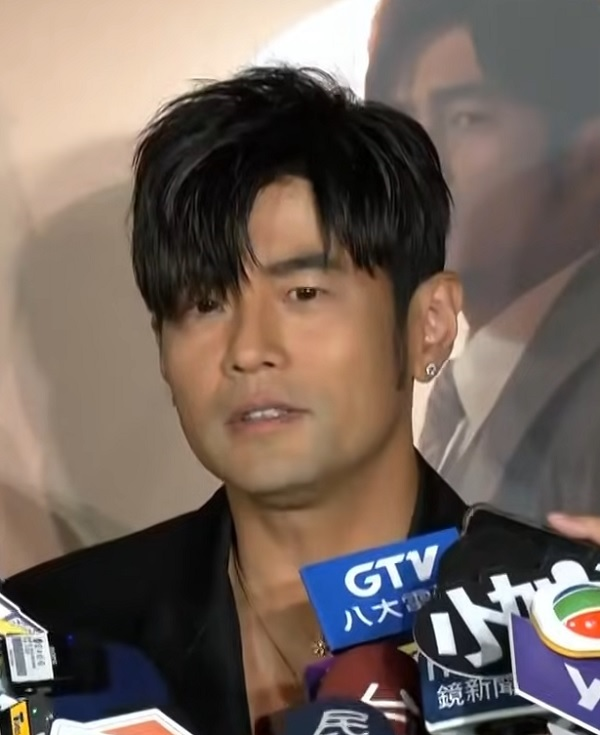
- Chou in 2026
- Born: Jay Chou Chieh-lun; 18 January 1979 (age 47); Linkou, Taipei County, Taiwan
- Occupations: Singer; songwriter; record producer; actor; television personality; businessman
- Years active: 2000–present
- Works: Albums; singles; songs recorded
- Spouse: Hannah Quinlivan (m. 2015)
- Children: 3
- Awards: Full list
- Musical career
- Origin: Taipei, Taiwan
- Genres: Mandopop; R&B; Chinese rock; Chinese hip-hop
- Instruments: Vocals; piano; cello; guitar; guzheng; dizi; drums
- Labels: Alfa Music [zh]; BMG; Sony Music; Sony BMG; JVR Music [zh]; Universal Music

Chinese name
- Traditional Chinese: 周杰倫
- Simplified Chinese: 周杰伦
Transcriptions
Standard Mandarin
- Hanyu Pinyin: Zhōu Jiélún
- Wade–Giles: Chou Chieh-lun
Southern Min
- Hokkien POJ: Chiu Kia̍t-lûn

Jay Chou Chieh-lun (traditional Chinese: 周杰倫; simplified Chinese: 周杰伦; pinyin: Zhōu Jiélún; born 18 January 1979) is a Taiwanese singer-songwriter, actor, director, and businessman. Widely regarded as one of the most influential figures in the Chinese-speaking world, he is referred to as the "King of Mandopop".

Chou signed to Alfa Music in 2000, and made his debut with the studio album Jay (2000). He rose to prominence with his second album Fantasy (2001), which became one of the best-selling albums in Taiwan in the 21st century. Chou incorporated diverse genres such as R&B and alternative rock in albums such as Yeh Hui-Mei (2003) and November's Chopin (2005), as well as influences from traditional Chinese music in works such as Common Jasmine Orange (2004). The latter featured the titular single and became the best-selling physical album in China in the 21st century, having sold over 2.6 million copies.

In 2007, Chou established his own label and management company JVR Music. His commercial success continued with albums such as On the Run! (2007), Capricorn (2008), and Jay Chou's Bedtime Stories (2016), all of which featured hit songs including "Blue and White Porcelain", "Rice Field", and "Love Confession", and "Shouldn't Be". He became the first Mandopop artist to top the IFPI Global Album Sales Chart, with Greatest Works of Art (2022) being the world's best-selling record in pure sales in 2022. Venturing outside of music, Chou made his acting debut in the film Initial D (2005), which was followed by roles in Curse of the Golden Flower (2006), Kung Fu Dunk (2008), The Treasure Hunter (2009), and Hollywood films The Green Hornet (2011) and Now You See Me 2 (2016).

Chou is one of the best-selling recording artists in Taiwanese history, having sold over 30 million albums worldwide. He is the most-awarded singer at the Golden Melody Awards—with 15 accolades, and his music videos are among the most-viewed on YouTube—with six surpassing 100 million views, the most for any Chinese artist. Chou's Opus Jay World Tour (2013–2015) generated over US$250 million in revenue while The Invincible World Tour (2016–2019) drew an audience of over 3 million.

== Early life ==
Jay Chou was born and raised in Linkou, Taipei County, Taiwan. Both his parents were secondary school teachers: his mother, Yeh Hui-mei (葉惠美; Yè Huìměi), who was an art teacher, while his father, Chou Yao-chung (周耀中; Zhōu Yàozhōng), is a biomedical researcher. His mother noticed his sensitivity to music and took him to piano lessons at the age of four.

During his childhood, he was fascinated with capturing sounds and songs with his tape recorder, which he carried everywhere with him. In the third grade, he became interested in music theory and also started cello lessons. He was an only child and loved to play piano, imitate TV actors, and perform magic tricks. His favorite composer was, and is still to this day, Frédéric Chopin.

Jay graduated from Taipei Jinhua High School. His parents divorced when he was 14 and he was teased by his classmates, which caused him to become reclusive and introverted. He had no friends and preferred to be alone, listening to music, contemplating and daydreaming. At Tamkang Senior High School, he majored in piano and minored in cello. He showed a talent for improvisation, became fond of pop music, and began to write songs. Chou was conscripted for mandatory military service after graduating from high school with inadequate grades for university. However, severe back pain triggered by sports eventually led to the diagnosis of ankylosing spondylitis, and he was exempted from military service. Meanwhile, he found a job as a waiter.

Chou's mother initially inspired Chou to become a music teacher, while Chou remained relatively clueless on what to do with his life. Without his knowledge, a friend registered both their names in a talent show called Super New Talent King in 1998. Chou played the piano accompaniment for his friend, whose singing was described as "lousy". Although they did not win, the show's host, Jacky Wu, happened to glance at the music score and was impressed with its complexity. Wu then asked who wrote it, discovered Chou and hired him as a contract composer and paired him with the novice lyricist Vincent Fang for his then record company, Alfa Music. Chou then spent most of his time in Wu's studio learning music producing, sound mixing, recording, and writing songs.

== Career ==
=== 2000–2002: Debut and commercial success ===
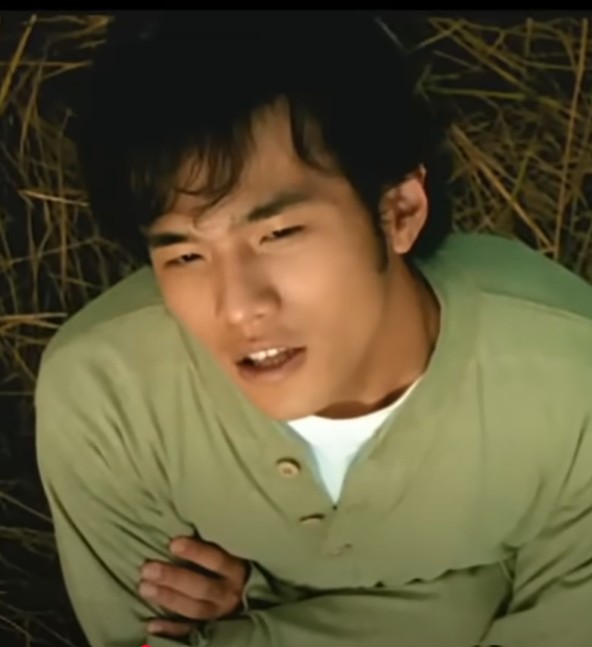
Jay Chou in the music video for "Starry Mood" in 2000

In 2000, under the recommendation of JR Yang, Jay Chou began to sing his own songs. Wu told Chou that he would help him release an album after he wrote 50 songs and he would pick 10 from there. Chou already had an arsenal of songs he wrote for others but had been rejected, so among those he chose 10 for his first album. Chou released his debut album Jay under Alfa Music under Jacky Wu in November 2000. Chou arranged the compilation, harmony, and production of all the songs. The album combines R&B, hip-hop, and other musical styles. Among them, the hit song "Starry Mood" (星晴) won the 24th China Top Ten Chinese Gold Songs. The album was promoted heavily by Jacky Wu in the entertainment shows he hosted. Chou himself also appeared on a few television programs to promote the album. Chou was marketed as a talented singer-composer with a unique tune. His collaboration with Vincent Fang and Vivian Hsu on the release brought about a few hits.

In 2001, Chou held his first series of five solo concerts, titled the Fantasy Concert, with the first stop on 11 January 2001, at the Taoyuan Arena, Taiwan. Followed by two shows at the Hong Kong Coliseum, one in Malaysia and ended in Singapore on 10 February 2002. On 9 July 2001, songwriters Jay and Yungai Hayung performed "The Roof", which was included in the album "A Little Wild" by Yungai Hayung. After promoting his debut album, Chou returned to the studio for the next twelve months to record and produce his next album, Fantasy, which helped him become an established star. This album was released in September 2001 and became a big hit, selling an estimated two million copies in Taiwan alone. However, in late 2001, Wu, due to mismanagement, decided to sell Alfa Music, including Chou's contract, to Holiday Co., Ltd., a KTV chain operator. The sale, finalized in 2002, soured Chou's relationship with Wu, leading to a prolonged feud which ended in 2018. Fantasy went on receiving ten nominations and won five awards at the 13th Golden Melody Awards in 2002, where Chou notably did not thank Wu. The album's R&B hits such as "Simple Love" (簡單愛) "Love Before BC" (愛在西元前), which won Chou the Best Composer award, and "Can't Express Myself" (開不了口) are still some of Chou's most popular songs to this day.

Chou's third album, The Eight Dimensions, became another commercial success and is similar in style to his second. Another collaboration with Fang, The Eight Dimensions included songs that invoke imagery, Chou's "mumbling" style, and mainly R&B tunes. The singer has sold over 750,000 copies of Fantasy as of 2002, throughout the region. In the same year, Chou held his debut concert tour The One. There was also more crossover activity between Malaysia and Indonesia, as well as steadily increasing activity by Japanese acts in the region. Chou released the compilation album Partners in April 2002, featuring 12 songs consisting of Chou's musical and Vincent Fang's lyrical compositions. Fang has written the words to more than 40 of Chou's songs, was the chief editor of Chou's book Grandeur de D Major, and is now Chou's business partner (together with Chou's manager JR Yang) for the record company JVR Music. His second concert tour, The One Concert, commenced on 28 September 2002, at Taipei Municipal Stadium, followed by 11 stops and ended at Shenzhen Stadium, China on 3 January 2004.

=== 2003–2005: Yeh Hui-Mei, Common Jasmine Orange, and November's Chopin ===
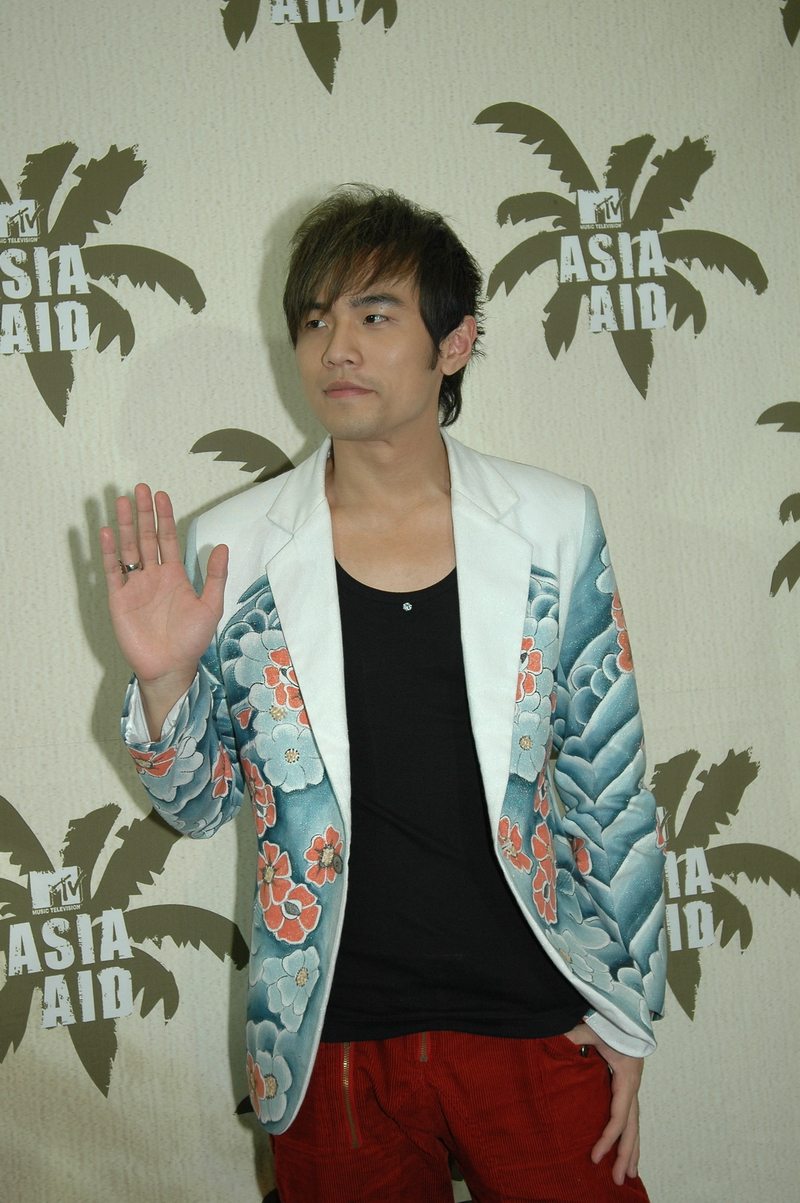
Chou at the MTV Asia Awards 2005

In 2003, Chou released his fourth album, Yeh Hui-Mei, which was named after his own mother. After the release of this album, he attended the Golden Melody Awards for his previous album's nomination. The album The Eight Dimensions was nominated for 5 categories but failed to win a single category. As a result, Chou didn't take his losses too lightly, as he wrote on his next album the song "Grandmother" (外婆) that he actually took the Golden Melody Awards way too seriously. Ironically, his then-current album Yeh Hui-mei would later go on to win a Golden Melody as "Best Album of the Year" award the following year in 2004.

Yeh Hui-mei was both a commercial and musical success. The album features songs on mafia and drug lords "In Father's Name" (以父之名) which at first hearing was very unorthodox but displays Jay's creative writing and producing ability. This album can be seen as Jay's second milestone because it gained an extremely positive reaction from both critics and supporters of his music. Jay also wanted to prove that he is a versatile artist and does not only write R&B songs, but he also ventured into more rock-flavored tunes such as "Sunny Day" (晴天) which was one of the most played songs of the year. This song gained widespread popularity and high school students started learning guitar to play the drift of the song's intro. He has performed live duets with Landy Wen, Jolin Tsai, and former girlfriend and news anchor Patty Hou.

In 2004, his album Common Jasmine Orange, released by Sony Music, excelled in Taiwan, Hong Kong and mainland China. Despite insurmountable piracy in Taiwan, which has reduced the recording industry to 5 to 10 percent from his heyday as a Taiwanese singer, Chou managed to produce a record that sold a record 300,000 copies in spite of the ordeal. In Hong Kong, his album surpassed local albums with sales of 50,000 units. In China, the official figure reached 2.6 million units, a figure that no other Mandopop artist has attained. The World Music Awards in September 2004 held in Las Vegas formally acknowledged him as the most popular Chinese singer based on commercial sales performance.

Chou started the band Nan Quan Mama in 2004, selecting band members and overseeing their album production. The group has been noted for sounding too similar to their mentor; as a result, Chou has reduced his involvement in the band, though he continues to increase their exposure by inviting them as guests performers for his concerts and music videos.

Chou formally entered the film industry in 2005 with the release of the movie Initial D. Some reviewers criticized his bland acting while others felt he performed naturally, but only because the character's personality closely mirrored his own. His performance in Initial D won him Best Newcomer Actor in Golden Horse Awards and Hong Kong Film Awards. In 2005, his album November's Chopin continued this record of success with sales of 2,500,000 copies sold in Asia including 280,000 copies sold in Taiwan. It became his first album to reach number one in Taiwan following the creation of the G-Music Combo album chart in July 2005. The track "Hair Like Snow" incorporated traditional Chinese instruments including the pipa and yangqin.

=== 2006–2009: Still Fantasy, On the Run!, and Capricorn ===
Two studio recordings of duets have been officially placed in his albums: "Coral Sea" in 2005 with Lara Veronin (of Nan Quan Mama) and "Faraway" in 2006 featuring Fei Yu-ching. Chou's second film was Curse of the Golden Flower (2006). As a supporting character, he drew much of the attention of Chinese reporters; Chou's involvement in this movie was announced in its own press conference, separate from the meeting held for Chow Yun-fat, Gong Li, and the other actors. Chou portrayed Prince Jai, the ambitious second eldest prince and general of the Imperial army whose personality epitomizes Xiao (孝), the Chinese virtue of filial piety. In this internationally released film, North American audiences saw Chou for the first time. According to Chinese movie critics, comments about his acting ranged from "lacks complexity" to "acceptable", but was critically praised by Western reviewers. His performance in Curse of the Golden Flower was nominated Best Supporting Actor in the Hong Kong Film Awards.

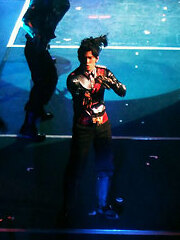
Chou performing in December 2007

Chou continued to make one album per year; the singer's seventh studio album, Still Fantasy, was released on 5 September 2006. The album peaked at number one on the Taiwanese G-Music Chart and number 63 on the Japanese Oricon Album Chart, and sold 250,000 copies in Taiwan. The record produced the tracks "Far Away", "Listen to Mom", and "White Windmill", which were listed at number two, number eight and number 53, respectively, on year-end song chart compiled by Hit FM. In April 2006, the album's track "Chrysanthemum Terrace" won Best Original Film Song at the 26th Hong Kong Film Awards.

On the Run! was released on 2 November 2007. The record contained hits such as "Blue and White Porcelain" (青花瓷). It peaked at number one on the album charts in Taiwan and received a platinum certification from the Recording Industry Association of Singapore (RIAS) in 2020. The songs "Cowboy is Very Busy", "Rainbow", and "Sunshine Nerd", were ranked at number 11, number 28, and number 59, respectively, on the year-end Hit FM Top 100 Singles chart. Chou embarked on The World Tour in support of the release, visiting numerous countries including Taiwan, China, Singapore, Malaysia, Australia, Canada and the United States from November 2007 to August 2009. The first concert at the Banqiao Stadium in Taipei attracted an audience of 30,000 people. Chou's three-day concert at the Nippon Budokan in Tokyo in February 2008 drew a total of 30,000 people. In February 2008, Chou portrayed a kung fu student and dunking prodigy in the film Kung Fu Dunk, and the film earned over ¥100 million (US$14.7 million).

Chou's ninth studio album, Capricorn, was released on 14 October 2008. The record produced songs such as "Floral Sea" (花海), Lan-Ting-Xu" (蘭亭序), and "Rice Field" (稻香). Streamed more than one billion times, "Rice Field" is a song about childhood memories and is reportedly written after the 2008 Sichuan Earthquake. "Rice Field", "Give Me the Time of a Song", and "The Promised Love", were ranked number 3, number 17, and number 56, respectively, on year-end Hit FM Top 100 Singles chart in 2008. The album became certified platinum in Singapore in 2020. In October 2009, Chou was featured on Cindy Yen's song "Sand Painting".

=== 2010–2016: The Era, Wow!, Opus 12, Aiyo, Not Bad, and Jay Chou's Bedtime Stories ===
On 18 May 2010, Chou released his tenth studio album, The Era. The record produced songs such as "Fireworks Cool Easily" and "Say Goodbye". "Superman Can't Fly", "Rain Falls All Night", and "The Era", were ranked at number 2, number 10, and number 39 respectively on the 2010s Hit FM Top 100 Singles of the Year chart. The album received seven nominations at the Golden Melody Awards and won three awards for Best Mandarin Album, Best Mandarin Male Singer and Best Musical Arranger.

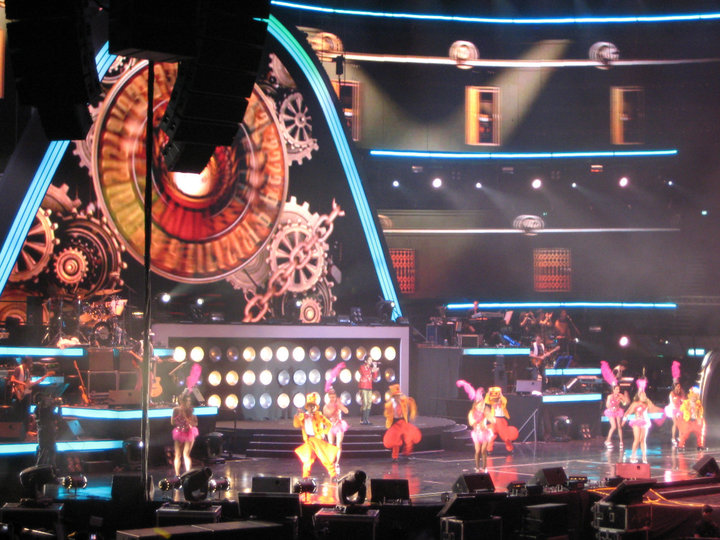
The Era World Tour in Singapore, 2010

To celebrate his 10-year career in the entertainment industry, Chou embarked on his fifth concert tour, The Era World Tour. The tour kicked off with a series of three concerts at the Taipei Arena from 11 to 13 June 2010. It then continued with 40 more stops, ending on 17–18 December 2011 at the Kaohsiung Arena. The stage design for The Era World Tour combined elements of avant-garde futurism and medieval aesthetics. 50,000 people attended the concert in Zhengzhou, China on 4 September 2010. In 2011, Chou collaborated with the late NBA player Kobe Bryant on the single "The Heaven and Earth Challenge" to promote youth creativity, as well as an upcoming slam-dunk competition in China. The song was released at a press conference before the NBA All-Star Game on 20 February 2011. Chou portrayed Kato in The Green Hornet, directed by Michel Gondry and released in January 2011, after Hong Kong actor Stephen Chow withdrew from the project; the film grossed over $228 million worldwide. MTV Networks' NextMovie.com named him one of the "Breakout Stars to Watch for in 2011". In May 2011, Chou started filming for a new movie, The Viral Factor directed by Dante Lam and starred various well known artistes such as Nicholas Tse. The movie was released in theatres over Asia on 17 January 2012. With most of the scenes shot in the Middle Eastern and Southeast Asian countries, earlier filming process has been slightly disrupted due to political conflicts in the Middle East.

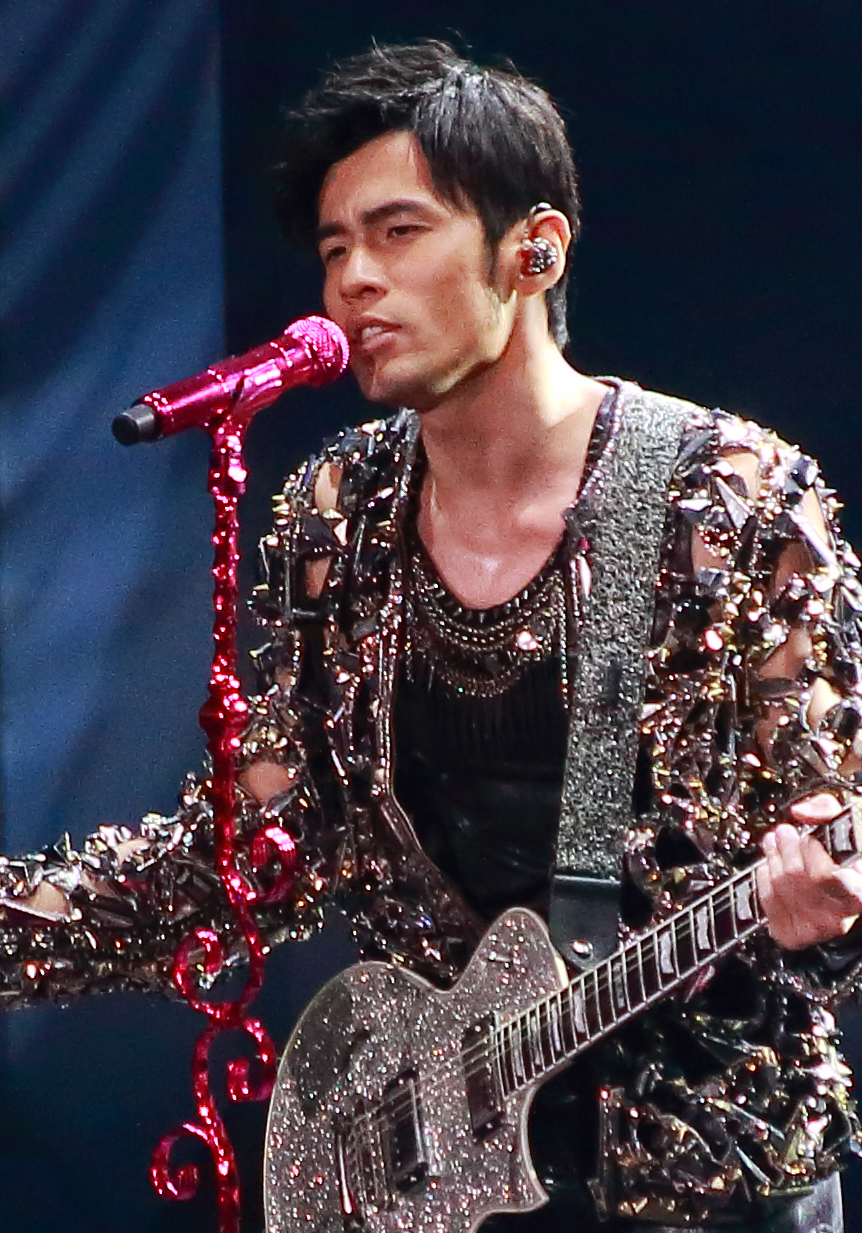
Chou performing during the Opus Jay World Tour in 2013

Chou released his eleventh studio album, Wow!, on 11 November 2011. The album received three nominations at the Golden Melody Awards and won the award for Best Album Packaging. His next studio album, Opus 12, was released on 28 December 2012. It became his seventh consecutive studio album to top the G-Music combo album chart in Taiwan, and received a platinum certification in Singapore in 2020.

To promote his album, Jay Chou launched his sixth concert tour, the Opus Jay World Tour, in May 2013. The opening concert of the tour took place at the Mercedes-Benz Arena in Shanghai from 17 to 19 May 2013. Chou's performance at the Allphones Arena in Sydney, Australia in April 2014 generated $1.4 million in revenue. Following the success of the Opus Jay World Tour, Chou revealed a follow-up concert leg named the Opus II Jay World Tour. The second leg commenced at the Shanghai Stadium on 2 May 2014, attracting close to 80,000 fans. His next studio album, Aiyo, Not Bad, was released on 26 December 2014. The record became his first to reach number one on the Billboard US World Albums chart and won Best Selling Digital Album of the Year at the QQ Music Awards and Miguhui Awards in 2015. In December 2015, the Opus Jay World Tour concluded with a total attendance of 1,800,000 people and over $250 million in revenue.

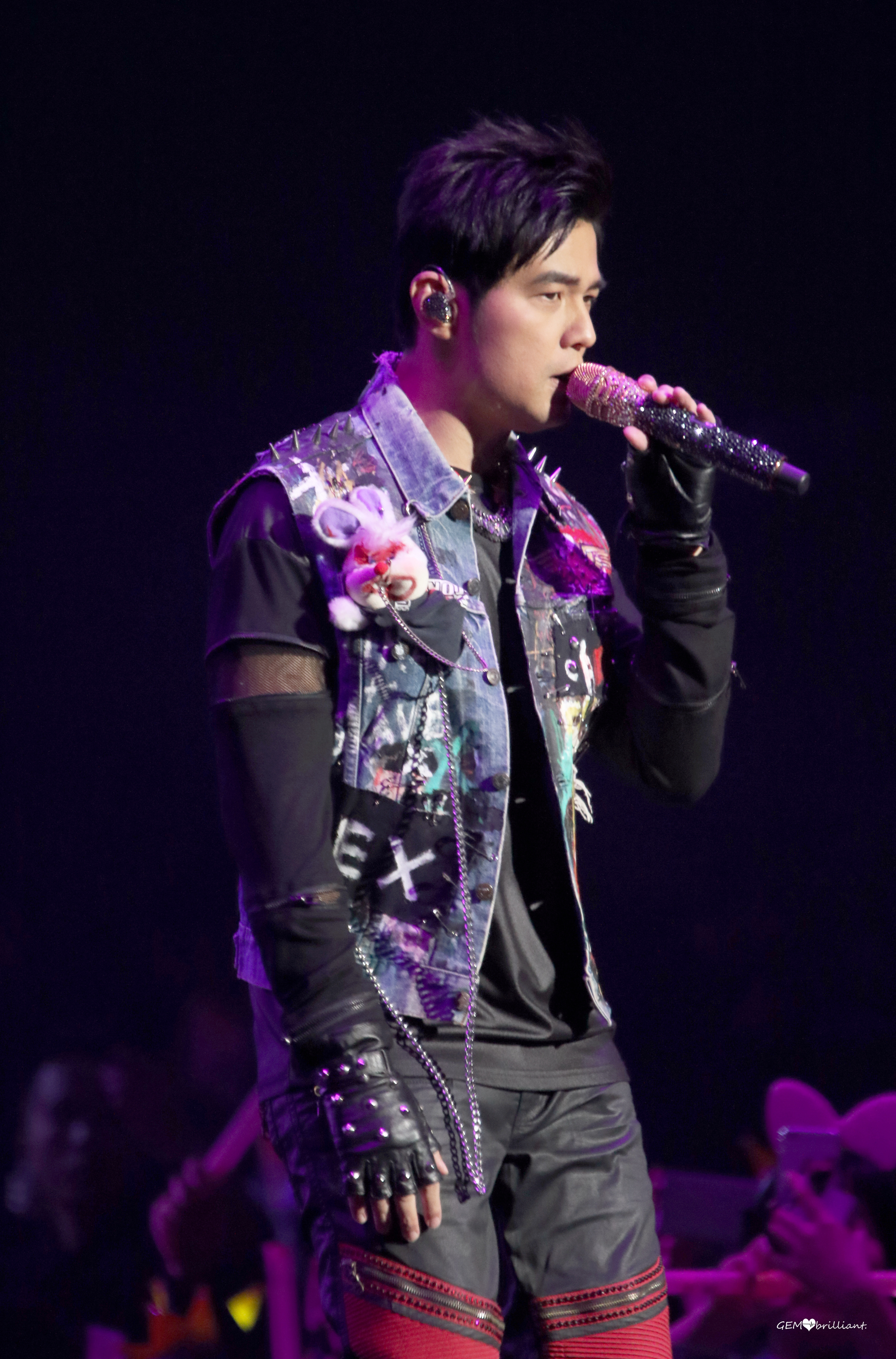
Chou performing in 2016

Chou's fourteenth studio album, Jay Chou's Bedtime Stories, was released on 24 June 2016. That same year, Chou and fellow Taiwanese recording artist A-Mei released the collaboration single "Shouldn't Be" (不該), which was included on the album's tracklist. The song won the 2016 Top 20 Golden Melody Awards in the Global Pop Music Gold List. One week after the release of Chou's fourteenth album, the singer embarked on his seventh world tour, The Invincible World Tour. The tour opened with a four-day concert at the Mercedes-Benz Arena in Shanghai from 30 June to 3 July, which saw a total attendance of 44,000 people. His concert at the Singapore National Stadium in Singapore on 3 September 2016 drew a crowd of 40,000 people.

Chou also recorded the song "Try" with Patrick Brasca for the Kung Fu Panda 3 movie.

Chou co-starred with English actor and former Harry Potter superstar Daniel Radcliffe in Now You See Me 2, which was released in June 2016. In 2018, it was announced that Chou joined the cast of Vin Diesel's fourth XXX film.

In 2021, Chou was briefly starred in Nezha, where he was the executive producer for the film. With a budget reportedly up to more than 400 million yuan ($61.8 million), the film used some expensive racing cars for the action sequences, accounting for about 80% of the entire content. Directed by Chen Yi-xian, the film also stars Tsao Yu-ning, Van Fan, and Alan Kuo. Chou and pop idol Wang Junkai show up in the film in cameo appearances.

=== 2017–2021: Concert tours and singles ===
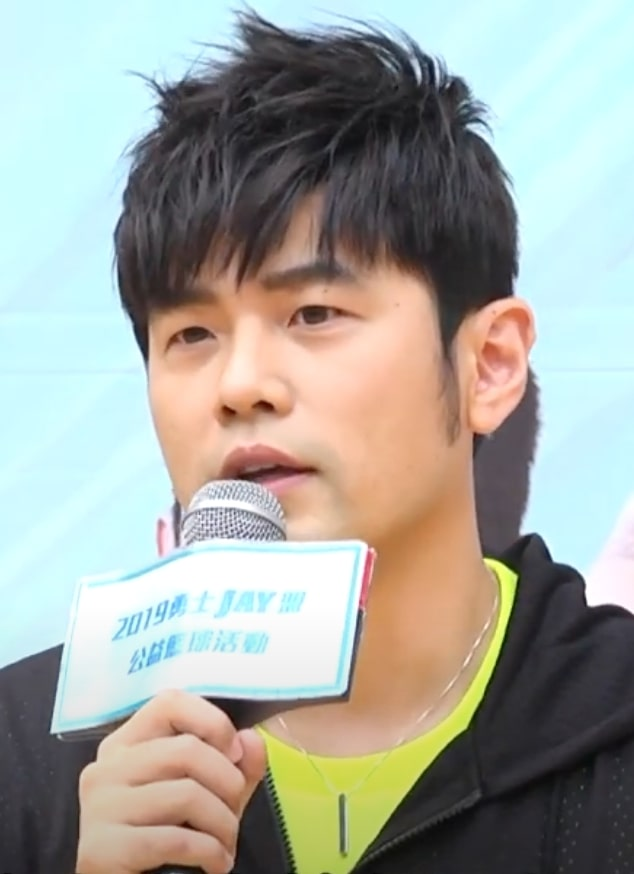
Chou in 2019

Chou's nine-day concert at the Hong Kong Coliseum in January 2017 attracted a total of 90,000 fans, while the concerts at the Beijing National Stadium on 25–26 August 2017, attracted 100,000 fans. The second leg of The Invincible World Tour commenced at the Singapore National Stadium on 6 January 2018, also drawing a crowd of 40,000. On 18 January 2018, Chou released the duet "Waiting for You" (等你下課) with Gary Yang. It entered the top five on the record charts in Malaysia and Singapore and was certified gold in the latter country. The content is about a young man who secretly fell in love with a girl. He regretted that he didn't study well and couldn't enter the same university with her. In order to wait for her to finish class, he rented a house near the girl's residence, waited for her silently, played the piano and wrote a love letter. He just wanted to convey his mind to her, but he couldn't find the time and way. He had to wait for the girl to finish class every day.

The Invincible World Tour concluded after 120 concerts in May 2019, drawing an estimated total of 3 million people. Chou made his chart comeback after a three-year hiatus with his long-awaited new single "Won't Cry". The song, which features Mayday vocalist, Ashin, was released on 16 September 2019, and its music video has since been viewed over 22 million times on YouTube. The song was reported to have caused QQ Music, China's biggest streaming platform, to crash on the day of its release. It additionally peaked at number one on the record charts in Singapore and Malaysia. To celebrate his 20th milestone year in the entertainment industry, his eighth world tour titled The Carnival World Tour was launched in Shanghai on 17 October 2019, with more stops to be announced. However, the tour was halted in January 2020 due to the COVID-19 pandemic. The single "Mojito" was released on 12 June 2020, becoming a viral sensation. The song, which effuses amorous feelings of Cuba with the name originating from the Cuban cocktail of the same name, sold more than 3 million digital downloads on the day of release, reportedly causing QQ Music to again crash.

=== 2022–2025: Greatest Works of Art and global commercial success ===
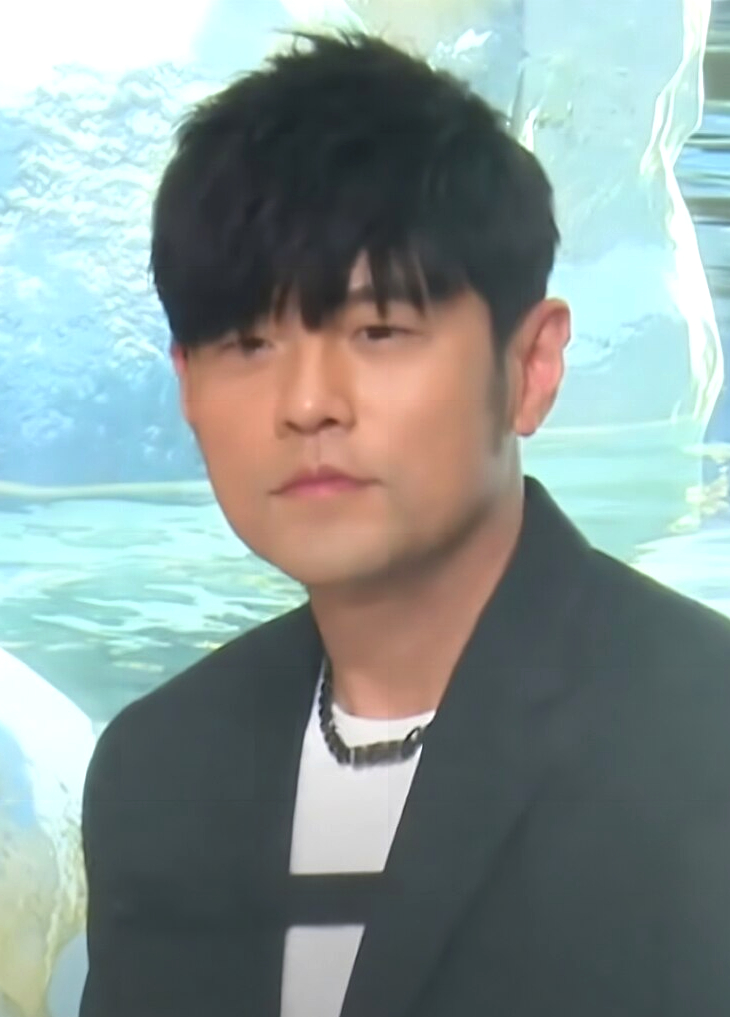
Chou at an event in Shanghai in July 2023

On 15 July 2022, Chou released his fifteenth studio album titled Greatest Works of Art. The record was preceded by six singles released from 2018 to 2022—"Waiting for You" with Gary Yang, "If You Don't Love Me, It's Fine", "Won't Cry" with Mayday vocalist Ashin, "Mojito", and the title track. The album saw commercial success worldwide; it was the best-selling album of 2022 globally in pure sales according to the International Federation of the Phonographic Industry (IFPI). Across all formats, the album reportedly sold over 7.2 million units. In China, the album sold five million units within one week and set a record for the highest first-week sales for an album worldwide, breaking the record previously held by Adele's album 25 in the United States in 2015, which sold three million units.

Following the commercial success of Greatest Works of Art, Chou resumed the Carnival World Tour at the Singapore National Stadium on 17–18 December 2022, which was attended by a total of 60,000 people. Chou performed in mainland China for the first time since the pandemic in June 2023, playing a four-day concert in Haikou, Hainan, for a total of 154,600 people. The tour attracted 95,100 tourists from outside of the province, resulting in a significant increase in the city's tourism. The Carnival Tour also boosted economic activities in other cities within mainland China such as Tianjin and Hohhot; both of which experienced a significant surge in tourism revenue following Chou's concerts, each nearing a total of ¥3 billion. On 21 December 2023, Chou and Gary Yang released a Christmas collaboration titled "Christmas Star".

=== 2026-present: Children of the Sun and other celebrity appearances ===
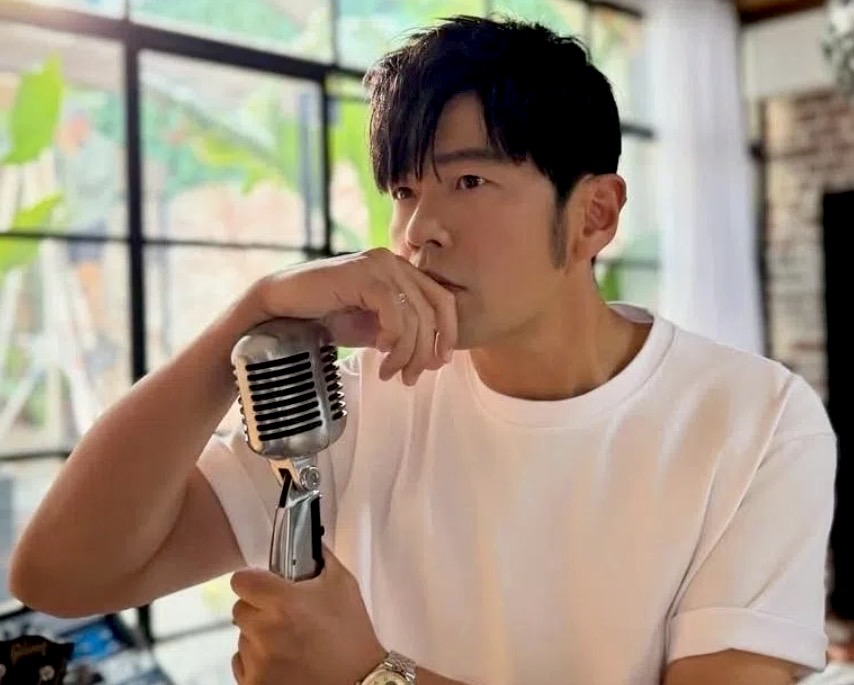
Chou in 2026

In January 2026, Chou participated as a celebrity wildcard in the Australian Open's inaugural 1 Point Slam exhibition match at the Rod Laver Arena in Melbourne. This was his first appearance as a competitor in an international tennis event. The Australian Open official announced his participation on its social media. Chou also stated that if he won the competition, he would donate all the prize money to charity organizations. In the first round, Chou faced an amateur Australian player, Petar Jovic. However, he failed to return Jovic's serve and was eliminated immediately, which ended his match in less than one minute.

On 26 March 2026, Chou released his sixteenth studio album, Children of the Sun. This marked Chou's first full-length album in more than three years, featuring 12 new songs, along with a bonus track titled "Christmas Star" which was previously released as a single with Gary Yang in 2023, bringing the total to 13 tracks. The record included songs such as "Children of the Sun", "Sicily" and "The Day It Rained". The song, "I Do", unveiled Chou's marriage proposal to his wife, Hannah Quinlivan, back in 2014 in its music video. As of 27 March 2026, the record has sold around 2.8 million USD worth of copies.

== Artistry ==
=== Influences ===
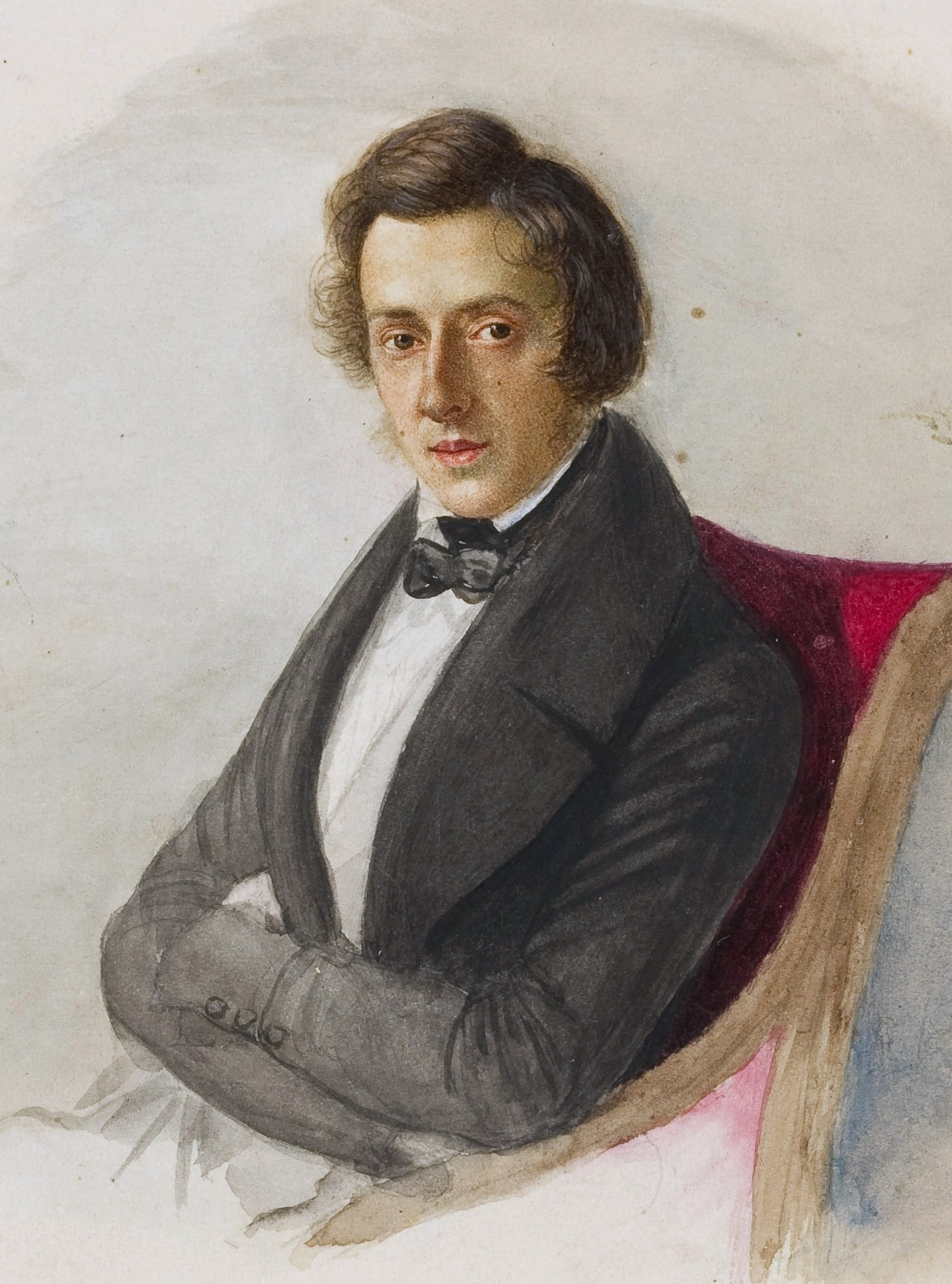
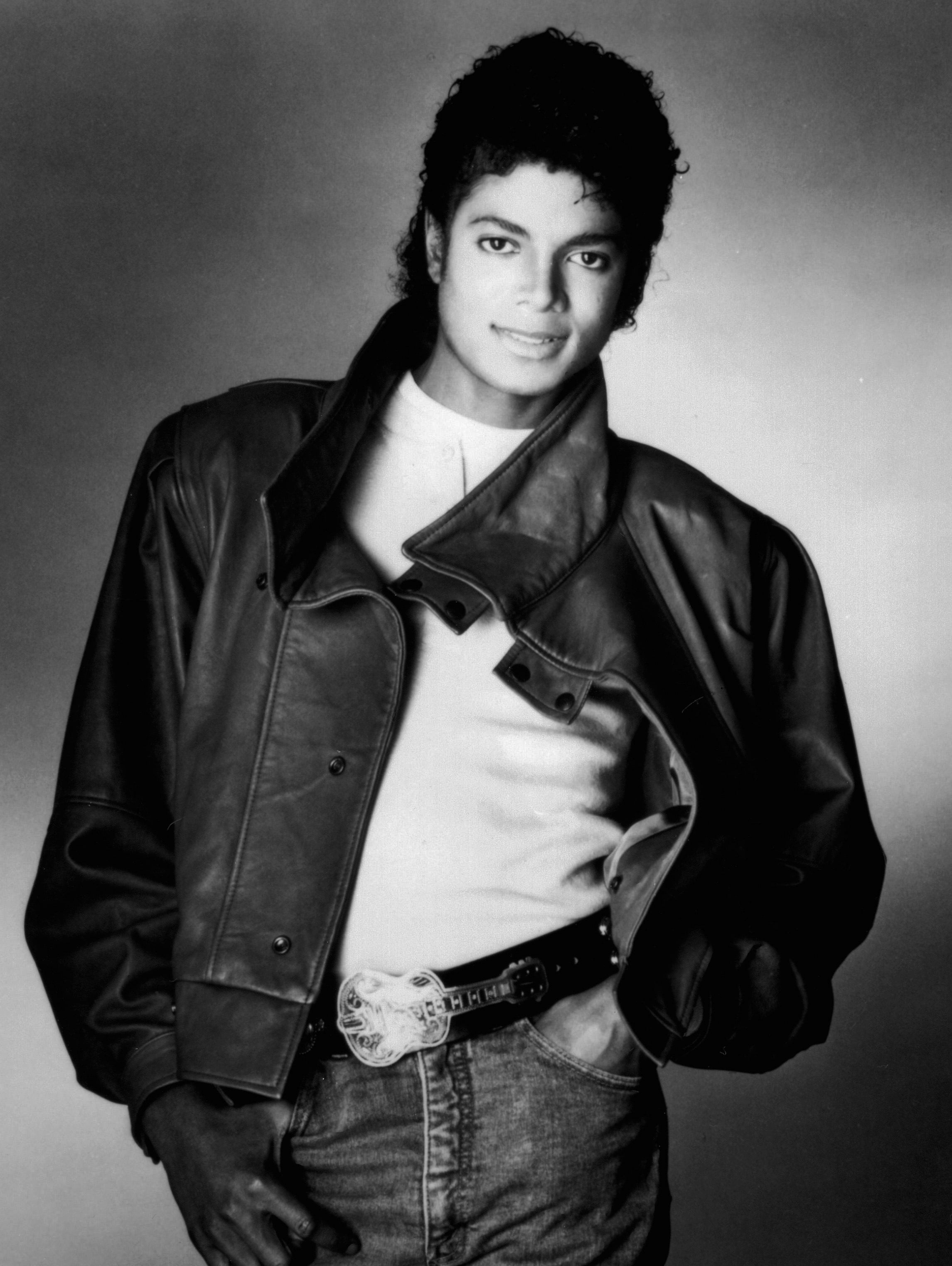
Chou credits composer Frédéric Chopin and singer Michael Jackson as some of his major influences.

Chou has drawn inspiration from a wide range of musical styles, blending Western hip-hop, rap, and R&B styles with classical and operatic elements rooted in Romanticism. He has cited Romantic composer Frédéric Chopin as his biggest influence and his favorite musician as a child, recalling, "Chopin is my favorite. [...] I think my music is heavily influenced by his. A lot of my hip-hop music in the background, has classical music and has a classical influence. That's why my music is different from other hip-hop songs." His admiration for the composer directly inspired his sixth studio album November's Chopin (2005) and its lead single "Nocturne", with the China Internet Information Center describing the record as "almost a concept album, with its autumnal theme and contemplative mood."

=== Musical styles and composition ===
Chou's music has been the center of much discussion across Chinese and other Sinophone-speaking regions around the world. This was for the reason that his music greatly and distinctively stood out from other mainstream Chinese popular musical artists given how varied his songs were at that time. What distinguished and separated Chou from the quintessential Chinese popular musical artist was that his pieces combined ancient themes with futuristic ones, including things like space ships, all while employing graphic storytelling skills to evoke vivid imagery to his audience. What also made Chou different was his enunciation, or lack thereof, whether rapping or singing, was also critiqued when listeners often found that they could not decipher the words sung until they looked up the lyrics. Critics referred to his singing as "mumbling". This garnered a lot of attention and reporters often quiz Chou on his singing style. Chou defended this as his signature style to infuse the vocals with the music and "make it blend" well together. Chou also stated that he wants the listeners to look at the lyrics stating the lyrics written by Vincent Fang are very deep.

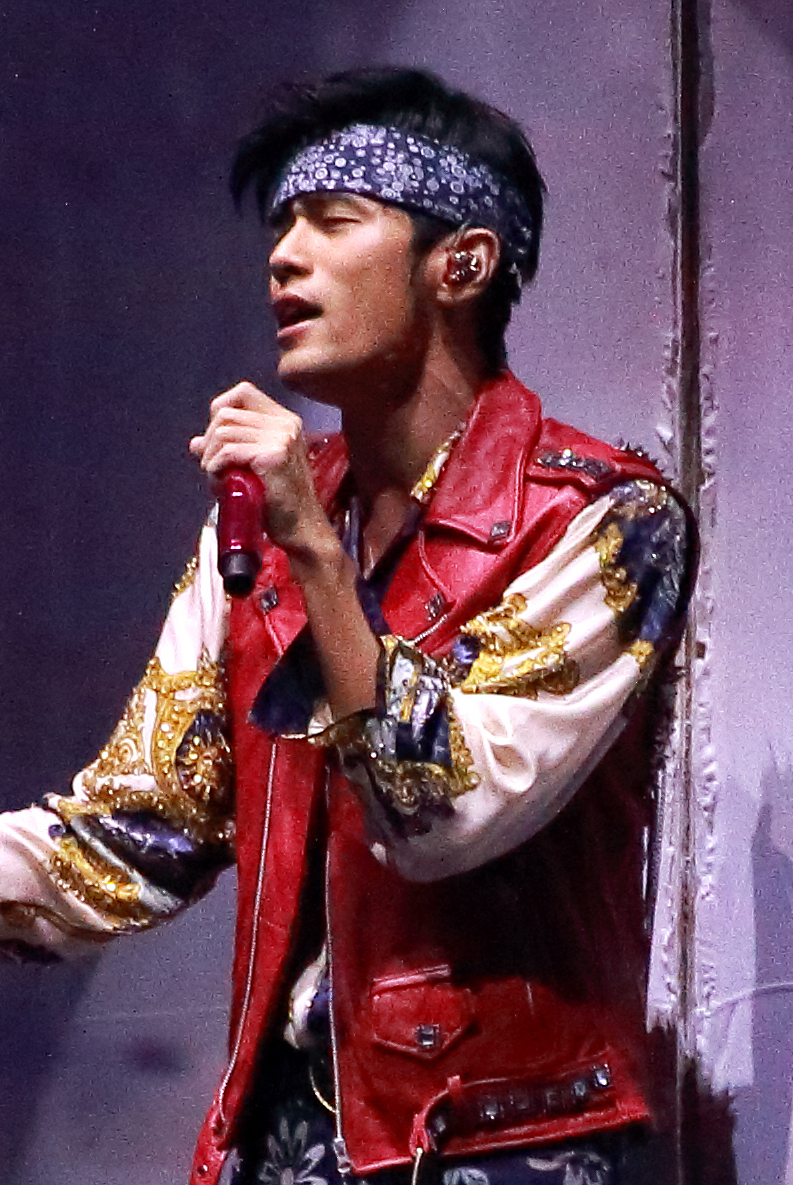
Chou performing in 2013

Chou's compositions are loosely categorized as pop music. While many of his works fall into contemporary Western R&B, rap, and rock genres, the term "Chou Style" has been popularized to describe his trademark cross-cultural music and insistence on singing with slurred enunciation. The Taipei Times once described the meaning of "Chou Style": "In what has become the archetypal Chou style, Taiwan's favorite son blends pop, rap, blues and a smorgasbord of aesthetic elements of world music to create his dream-like never-never land..." His fusion of traditional Chinese instruments and Western popular musical styles such as R&B or rock became known as "Zhongguo feng", which literally means "Chinese Style Music".^{[a]} Some of these fusion-based songs are written in the Pentatonic Scale as opposed to the more common seven-note scale (Diatonic scale) to accentuate a distinct East Asian musical style, where Chou's most popular songs all at least retain some rudimentary elements of indigenous and traditional Han Chinese cultural and musical forms. Sound effects from everyday life are frequently woven into his music, such as bouncing ping pong balls, touch tone phone dialing, helicopter blades, dripping rain, and radio static noise (Musique concrète).^{[b]}

His compositions frequently utilizes classical textures. For example, counterpoint was used in "Perfection" and "Sorry", while polyphony can be found in "The Wound That Ends War" and "Twilight's Chapter Seven". Chou's albums have been noted for the lack of change compared to his earlier works, yet he firmly stated that he will not alter his style: "They say I've been standing still ... but this is the music I want, and I don't see what I want by moving ahead." To demonstrate his point, he named his 2006 album Still Fantasy after his 2001 album Fantasy. His use of relaxed enunciation has been criticized as "mumbling" which he also insisted will not change; however, recently he has adopted clearer pronunciation for certain songs, particularly more traditional Chinese style songs, such as "Faraway" which features Fei Yu-ching and "Chrysanthemum Terrace".

=== Lyrics ===
Chou is considered more of a singer-composer than a lyricist. Several "regulars" write the lyrics for most of his music, but the content and style is unified with his own personality and image, covering a diverse range of topics and ideas. Vincent Fang accounts for more than half of the lyrics in his albums, helping to establish an important element in Chou's music: the use of meaningful, imagery- and emotionally rich lyrics, sometimes written in the form of poetry with reference to Chinese history or folklore.^{[c]} In addition to writing romantic hits,^{[d]} he also touches on war, the Bible, sports, and martial arts.^{[e]} Vivian Hsu is a singer herself and has helped with Chou's earlier hits.^{[f]}

Chou himself has written lyrics for many ballads,^{[g]} but has also discussed societal ills such as drug addiction in "Coward" and loss of the rural countryside to urbanization in "Terrace Fields". Domestic violence discussed in "Dad, I'm Home" received a great deal of commotion since he was the first to bring up this taboo subject in Sanscript music. "In the Name of Father" detailing the cruelty and brutality of the violence, this song is not Jay's personal experience. Jay describes the phenomenon of domestic violence in society, and wants to appeal the public pay more attention to domestic violence.

=== Chinese cultural elements ===
Chou leads a new trend of music which combines western musical elements and Chinese literature terminology. Because of this unique combination, he makes the subtle distinction between himself and other musicians by leading a musical style that incorporates elements of Chinese culture called "Zhongguo feng" in the history of East Asian popular music. The success of his Western-Chinese musical combination is built on his marketing strategies and the musical elements involved in his works. In early 21st century, the People's Republic of China initiated the reform and opening up. The new generation was looking for a consumption pop culture which would reflect individual uniqueness in the social circumstance. Chou has also successfully generated airtime on CCTV by fitting in with the mainland China's political and cultural agenda by celebrating traditional Chinese cultural values.

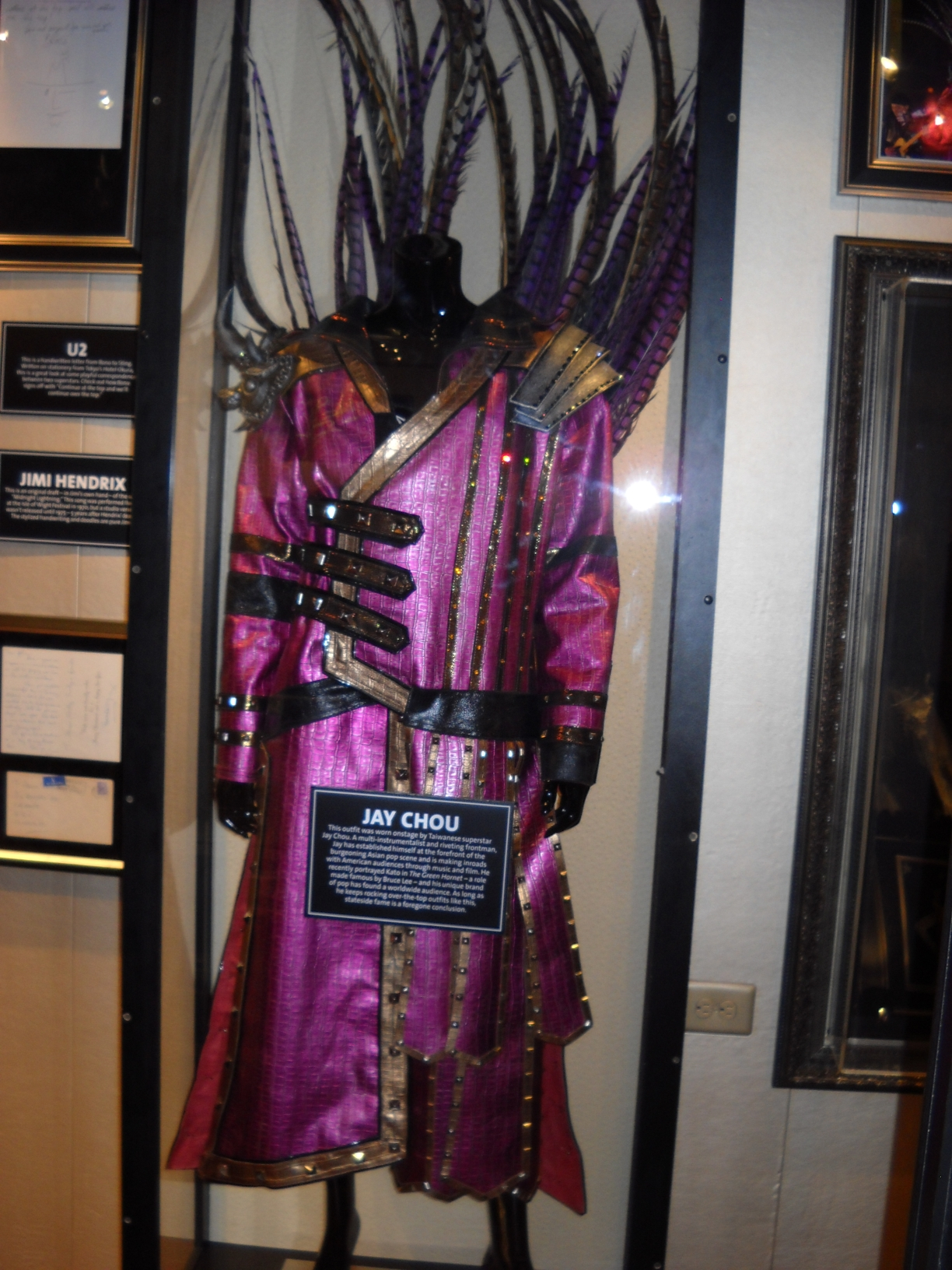
Chou's 2007 tour outfit exhibited at the Hard Rock Cafe 40th anniversary tour in Seattle, 2011

Elements of traditional Chinese culture incorporated into Chou's music have contributed and galvanized his status within the realm of modern East Asian popular music. The blowing Zhongguo feng in his music leads a new trend of Chinese pop music that incorporates a vast amount of traditional Chinese components, rather than simply following a Western music format. Chou's Zhongguo feng is highlighted in his lyrics and the use of traditional Chinese musical instruments in his music. The lyricist Vincent Fang has worked with Jay Chou since 2000, and Fang's work is featured by addressing traditional elements of Chinese culture, such as poetry and Confucianism. His representative work "Chrysanthemum Terrace", released in 2006, shows a vast amount of cultural elements. In this work, Fang puts images which indicate certain traditional ideas to build an ancient monarchy setting. He uses chrysanthemum as a metaphor of love. In the line "Chrysanthemums broken, scattered across the floor, your smile has faded" (菊花殘 滿地傷 你的笑容已泛黃), as well with "Blue and White Porcelain" and "Orchid Pavilion".

Chou also performs in a rhythm and blues style, but within this Western musical form, he has incorporated indigenous Han Chinese melodies, themes, and rhythms. His 2003 song "East Wind Breaks" features a typical Chinese melody performed in a Western-oriented R&B style; its instrumentation also creates a Chinese atmosphere with the pipa. In the lyrics, Chou expresses sadness and loneliness subtly, similar to traditional Chinese poetry. Chou also uses traditional Chinese musical instruments, combining traditional Chinese musical elements with Western popular musical forms.

== Other ventures ==
=== Directing ===
Chou acquired his first directing experience in 2004 through music videos. He initially experimented with a song by the group Nan Quan Mama titled "Home" (Chinese: 家; pinyin: jiā) where he was involved throughout the entire process from research to editing. After learning the difficulties of being a director, he refused to direct again even at the request of his record company. However, his interest resurfaced again as he directed music videos for 4 of the 12 songs in own album November's Chopin in 2005, and later television advertisements. By 2006, he had taken responsibility for the storyboard, directing, and editing of music videos for all his songs. It is unclear how the public appraises his work, since music videos are rarely the subject of critical review; however, director Zhang Yimou said that Chou's directing abilities may surpass his own in the future, after viewing several of Chou's music videos.

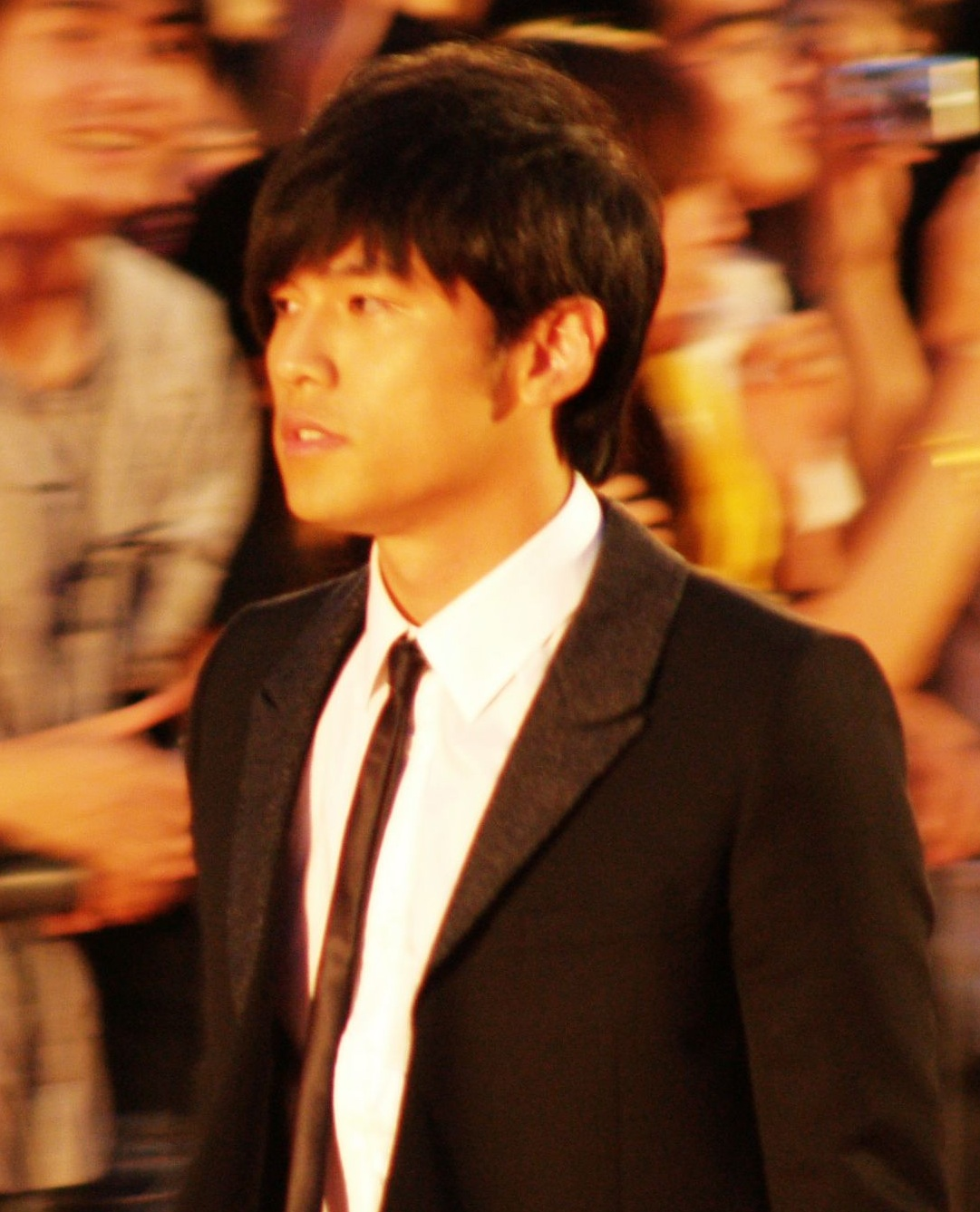
Chou at the 2007 Shanghai Film Festival

In February 2007, Chou began directing his first film Secret. The script written by Chou was inspired by his relationship with a high school girlfriend, with a plot focused on music, love, and family. He stars as the lead actor of the film with Gwei Lun-mei as the female lead, and Hong Kong veteran actor Anthony Wong as Chou's father. Despite previous experience in filming music videos, Chou admits that movies are more challenging due to storyline and time constraints. This movie was released in July 2007. In 2013, Jay Chou released his second directorial film, a musical drama titled The Rooftop. It generated a more muted response compared to his directorial debut, the box office receipts in mainland China on the other hand were more positive.

=== Grandeur de D Major ===
Chou published his first book titled Grandeur de D Major (simplified Chinese: D调的华丽; traditional Chinese: D調的華麗; pinyin: D diào de huálì) on 25 November 2004.^{[j]} This 200-page book features a prologue written by his family, friends, and co-workers; the main section is a compilation of his personal attitudes, philosophies, and recollections of childhood experiences along with pictures from his music videos, many of which have never been released; and lastly, a list of the artist's major awards, musical and lyrical compositions, and discography. For the usually low-profile singer, this book revealed his personality and convictions that has served as the basis of his musical and public image. He demonstrated a strong appreciation of family values with an especially deep connection with his mother and maternal grandmother. His confidence and dedication towards music is evident as he dedicated 2 out of 7 chapters to music: the current state of the industry, his composition methodology, and the importance of individualism to his success in music. This pride is contrasted against his modesty and self-assessed naïveté about many aspects in life, particularly regarding relationships and marriage.

=== Endorsements ===
Chou has been a spokesperson for popular brands such as Pepsi (2002–2007), Panasonic (2001–2005), Motorola (since 2006), M-Zone/China Mobile (since 2003), Levi's (2004–2005), Deerhui (sporting goods, since 2003), Metersbonwe Group (casual wear, since 2003), Colgate (2004–2005), popular computer game Warcraft III: Reign of Chaos (2002), and science and nature magazine National Geographic (2005). To maximize the celebrity branding effect, advertisements are nearly always linked to his music and TV commercials are occasionally directed by him. He acted as the tourism ambassador for Malaysia in 2003. In April 2008, Jay signed with Sprite and collaborated with artistes such as Angela Chang and JJ Lin in commercials. He also did a Sprite commercial with NBA player Kobe Bryant and specially wrote a song named "Battle of the Incomparable" that also featured Bryant for the commercial. In June 2011, Chou expanded his area of endorsement into the field of technology, becoming the designer and spokesperson of the "N43SL Jay Chou Edition" laptop of ASUS Computers. The laptop is most notable for its lid design, sound system, start-up and shut-down tones, and a unique "J" font for its key. All of which, except for the sound system, are designed and composed by Jay himself. In 2015, Chou formally endorsed Luxgen, a Taiwanese automaker.

=== Philanthropy ===
Outside of his traditional ventures in business and entertainment, Chou is also an ardent philanthropist. He has been the spokesperson for "Angel Heart Foundation" since 2012, a non-profit charity for children with intellectual disability. In 2013, he hosted a voluntary concert for them.

In 2014, Jay accepted the Ice Bucket Challenge from Andy Lau, and also donated NT$100,000 to Taiwanese ALS Foundation, and also donated NT$2 million in the aftermath of 2014 Kaohsiung gas explosions. He also attended the charity event from Fubon Charity Foundation, and has been the ambassador for the charity, which helps school children with disabilities, hardship or giving children living in poverty a scholarship for their education. He had already donated NT$970 million in the last 5 years, sponsoring over 300 of the thousand benefactors, and would extend the offer by 5 years, and opened 300 more scholarships, and donated a lump sum of NT$10.8 million in the next 5 years worth NT$2.16 million each year. In June 2014, he also went on tour with Will Liu to visit many schoolchildren in remote areas of Taiwan. Jay's second tour is scheduled in August 2015, two months after he officially became the spokesperson for the scholarship plan.

=== Business ventures ===
During the mid to late 2010s, Chou made forays in his business career by venturing into the eSporting sphere. In 2016, he purchased the esports (League of Legends) team Taipei Assassins and renamed it J Team. His role is limited to being a backing investor and team owner despite himself holding the titular role of a 'captain/leader,' as he will only partake in celebrity matches, and would not involve in the day-to-day operations and coaching of the team.

In 2017, Chou spent about 18 million RMB to construct a Jay eSports building in Shenzhen, which provided updated computer devices and the streaming areas for eSports players in China. More importantly, if Chou decides to hold more and more eSports events in the Jay eSports building, which is helpful for the germination of the eSports industry in China.

== Public image ==
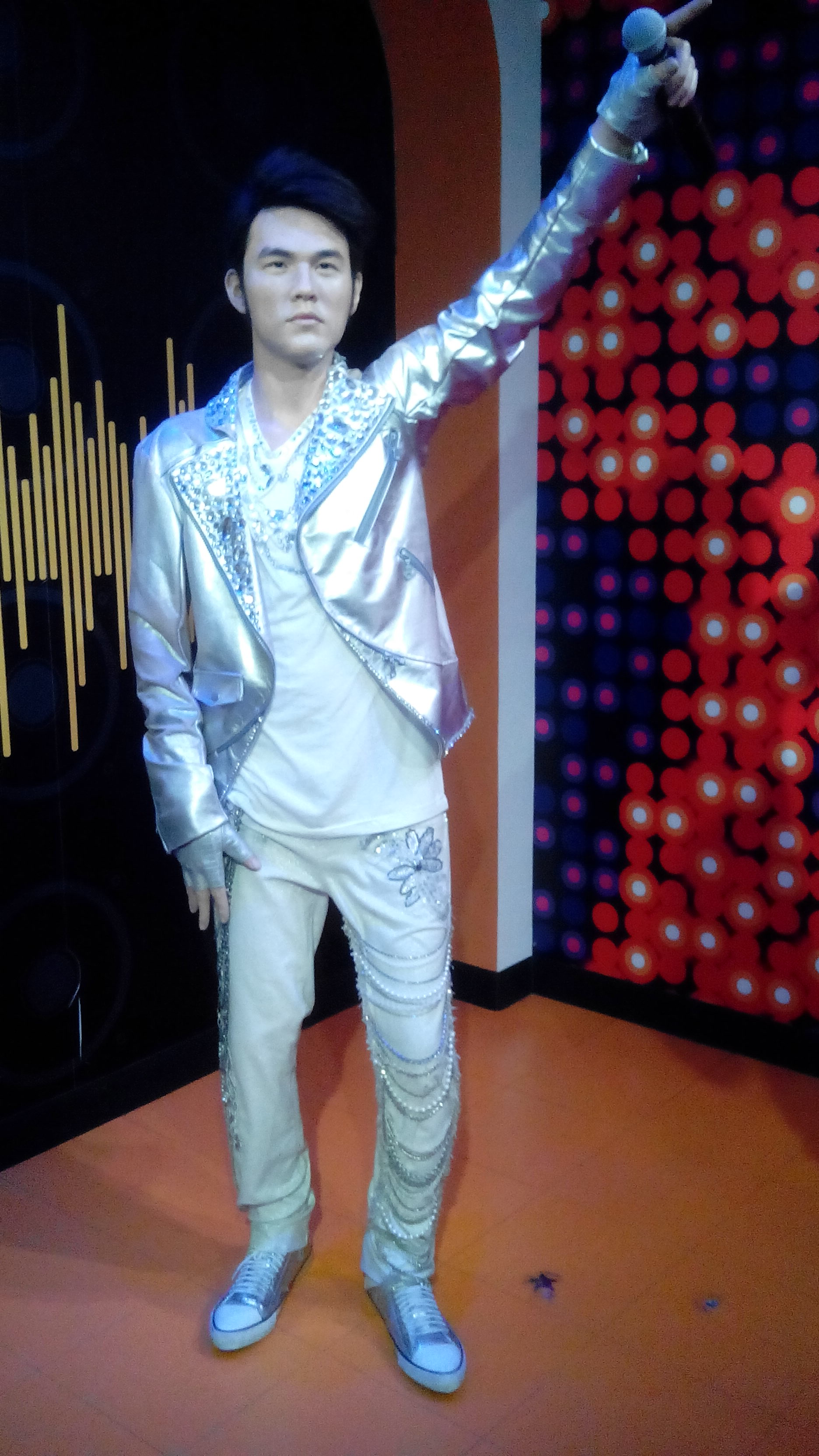
Chou's wax statue at Madame Tussauds Hong Kong

Despite living under continual media scrutiny, Chou's public image has changed little over the years as he emphasizes individuality as his "personal philosophy". In his music, this is also evident as he fuses Chinese and Western styles and explores topics unconventional for a pop singer, which have been described as "authentic" and "revolutionary". The media describes a hard-working perfectionist with clear self-direction who is occasionally regarded as competitive and a "control freak".

There is a misunderstanding about his nickname "President Chou" (Chinese: 周董; pinyin: Zhōu dǒng), used by both the press and fans to underscore his domineering personality and impact on East Asian popular music, but also points at his musical talent. It also points to the fact that he is the CEO, spokesperson and chairperson of his many business ventures like clothing lines and his own talent agency (JVR Music). Yet the origin of this nickname emerges from his fever of collecting antiques as the word "董" comes from "antique" in Chinese (古董), and according to JJ Lin, they both like to collect and drive antique cars. When he initiated Nan Quan Mama, it was also based on his pen name in his high school years, and the band's name was also dedicated to his mother. In fact, Nanquan is an actual style of martial arts from south of the Yangtze River. As Jay was influenced by action movies, he also wrote songs about martial arts, even when he had no formal training in any martial arts discipline.

Outside of music, Chou is reported as shy, quiet, modest, and views filial piety as "the most important thing". In line with his aim to present a positive image, he is a non-smoker and non-drinker and does not go to nightclubs. Government officials and educators in East Asia have awarded him for his exemplary behaviour, designated him a spokesperson in the youth-empowerment project "Young Voice" in 2005 and an anti-depression campaign in 2007. His lyrics for two songs^{[h]} have been incorporated into the school syllabus to inspire motivational and filial attitudes. In November 2007, Chou was criticized by some for attending the funeral of Taiwanese gang leader Chen Chi-li to console Chen's son Baron Chen, whom Chou met while filming Kung Fu Dunk.

=== Relationship with the media and paparazzi ===
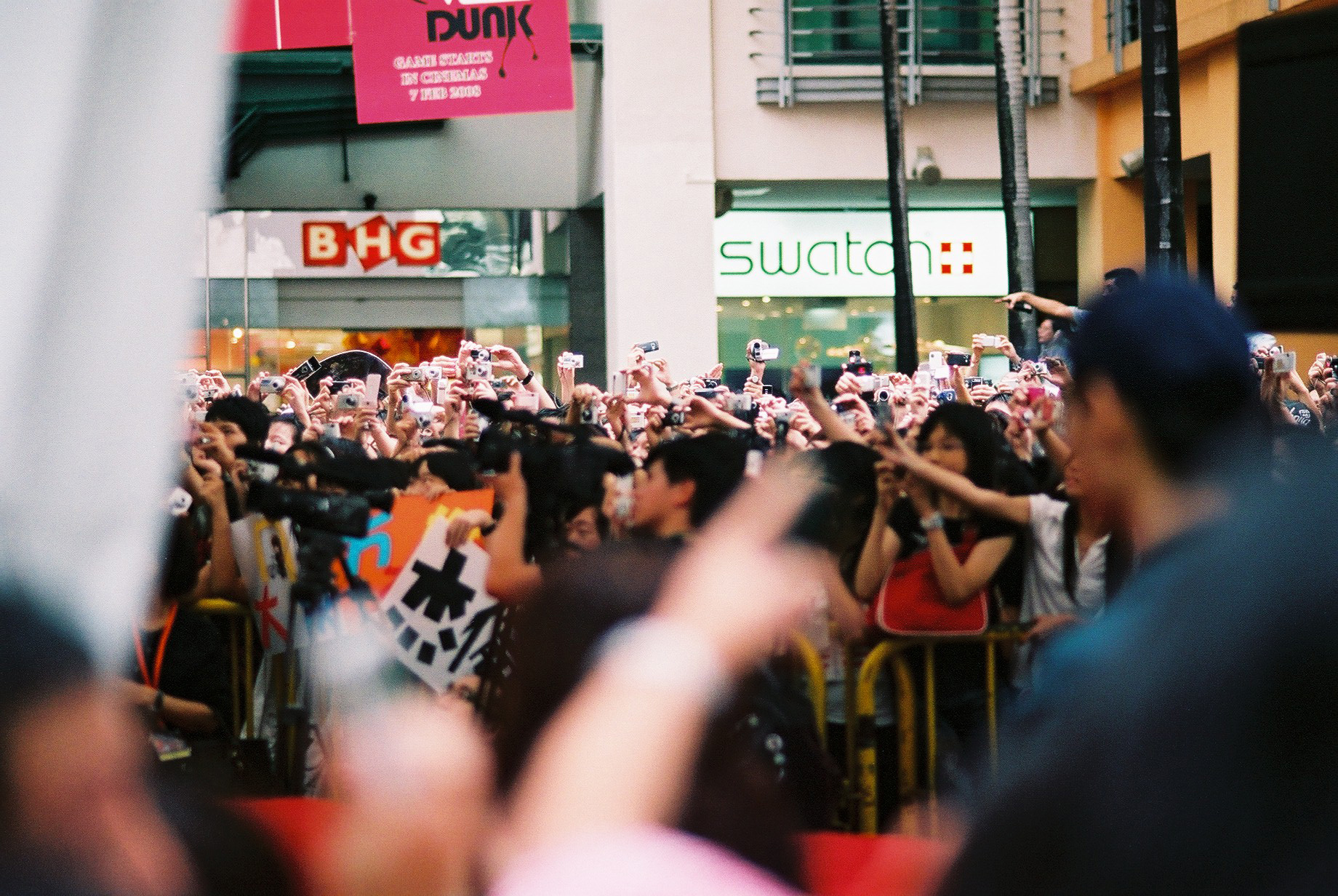
Fans waiting for Chou in Hong Kong, February 2008

Chou has been known for his tense relationship with and strong dislike of paparazzi. In 2005, He released a diss track, "Besieged From All Sides", targeting paparazzi and tabloids. In 2007, he released a song, "Not Good Enough For You", about a relationship that broke down due to intrusive media attention. Through his career, he had multiple physical confrontations with paparazzi, though his attitude over them has mellowed in recent years. To discourage unsolicited photography, Chou is known to photograph the paparazzi who follow him. Despite his aversion to paparazzi, Chou acknowledges that not all media attention is unwelcome. Coverage by international media such as Time, The Guardian, and Reuters help ascertain his influence on mainstream culture. At the end of 2009, he was included on JWT's annual list of 100 Things to Watch in 2010.

=== Fanbase ===
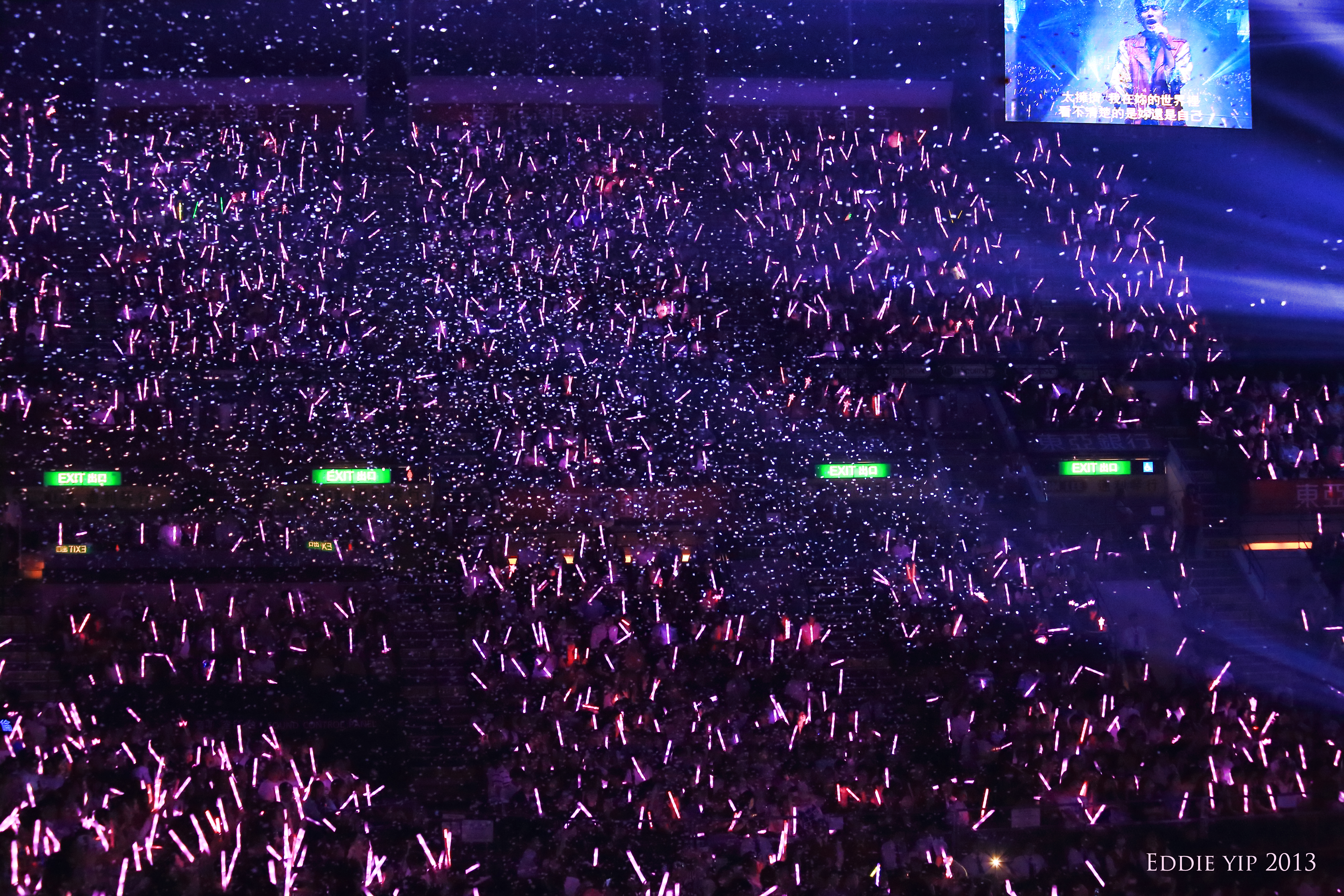
Chou's Opus Jay World Tour in Hong Kong, 2013

Chou's fanbase originated from Taiwan and grew extensively to other Mandarin-speaking regions. The Sinophone-speaking populations of China, Hong Kong, Macau, Singapore, and Malaysia make up a significant percentage of Chou's fans. Despite rampant piracy issues in East and Southeast Asia, particularly in China, every album Chou has released so far has surpassed sales in excess of 2 million. According to Baidu, the most popular internet search engine in China, Chou was the number one searched male entertainer in 2002, 2005, 2006, and 2007.

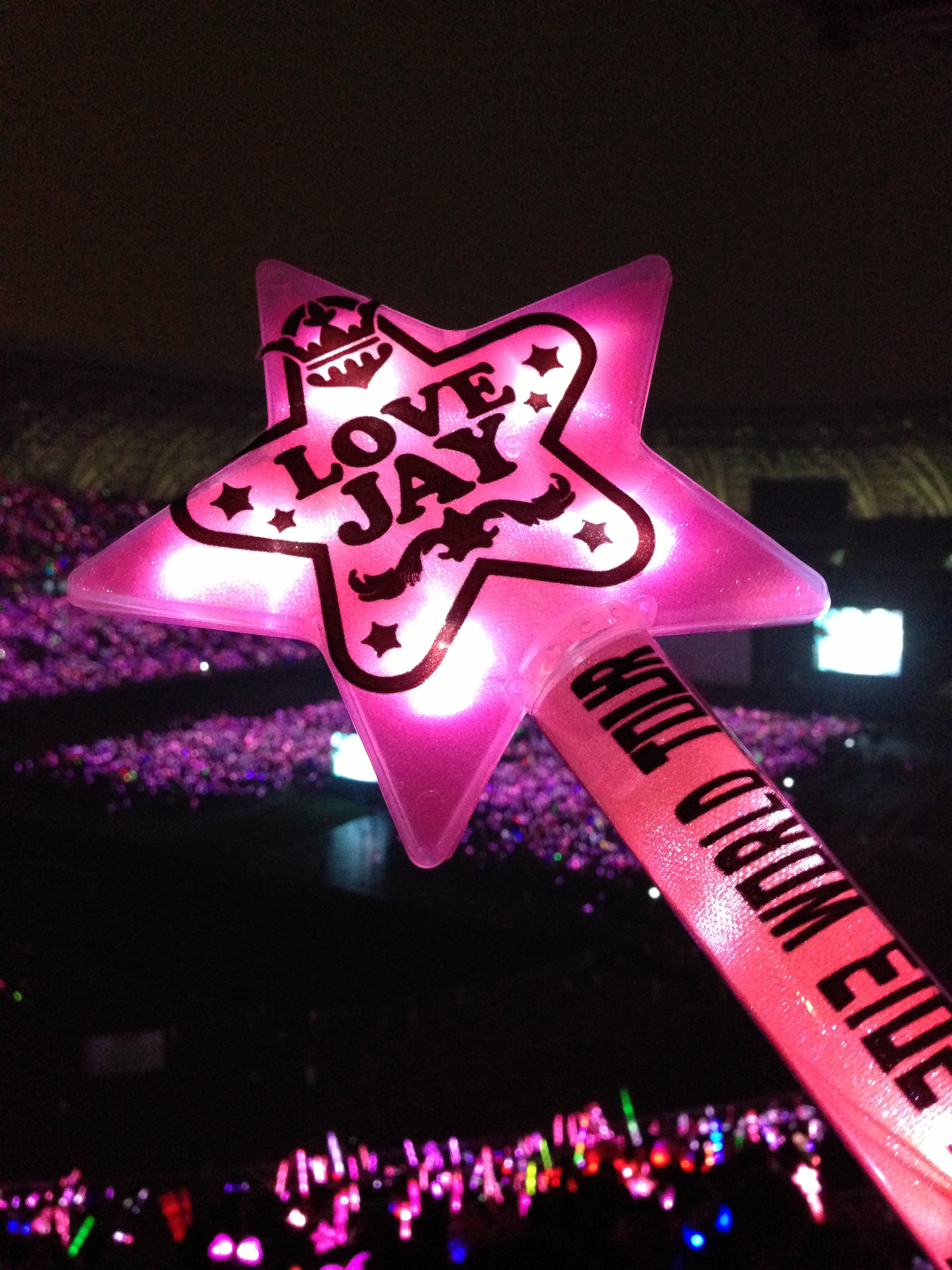
A fan holding a lightstick at Chou's concert in Tianjin, 2013

In 2006, Chou composed and sang the theme song for Fearless, a movie released in major theatres in most English-speaking countries, though the impact to his fame has been minimal. His role in Curse of the Golden Flower (limited release) marks his acting debut in North America. Despite having a supporting but important role in the story's plot, the North American version of the official posters only featured a view of his back, greatly contrasting the East Asian versions where his face and name were clear and placed between the leading actor and actress. Although Chou is still far from being well known English-speaking audiences in the Western world, this movie nonetheless brought him international exposure. Chou gained further exposure to Western audiences in his starring role as crimefighter Kato in January 2011's The Green Hornet.

== Impact and legacy ==
Chou has been recognized as one of the most prominent and influential figures in the Chinese-speaking world. An editorial written by Kerry Brown of Chatham House named Chou as one of China's 50 most influential figures in 21st century, one of only three singers on a list dominated by politicians and corporate owners. In September 2009, Chou was voted as the third most influential Chinese cultural celebrity in the past 60 years in a government online poll to celebrate the 60th anniversary of the People's Republic of China, ranking only behind Teresa Teng and Faye Wong. In December 2009, CNN included Chou in their list of "Who Mattered Most in Asia in 2009", having earned NT$554 million during the year.

On 16 July 2003, "In the Name of the Father" was first broadcast on 50 radio stations across Asia, with an audience of 800 million listeners tuning in simultaneously. 16 July was subsequently designated as "International Jay Chou Day" in recognition of the singer's contributions to the Chinese music industry. In Cupertino, California, 31 December 2010, was designated as Jay Chou Day by mayor Joseph Wong, which marked the last day of the first decade of the 21st century. In 2011, 257248 Chouchiehlun, an asteroid discovered at the Lulin Observatory in Taiwan, was named in honor of Chou.

== Awards and achievements ==
From the launch of his music career in 2000, Chou has won singer-songwriter and producer awards in Asia. The highly coveted Golden Melody Awards in Taiwan ^{[i]} awarded "Best Album" for his debut CD Jay (2000) in 2001, and five awards (including "Best Album", "Best Composer", and "Best Producer") in the following year for the album Fantasy (2001). However, failure to win "Best Album" for three consecutive years has left him disheartened with award ceremonies. Although he continues to win more than 20 awards per year from various organizations in Asia, Chou has stated he will rely more on album sales as an indicator of his music's quality and popularity.

Jay Chou scored strong radio and video airplay in Italy with his track "Nunchucks", in 2002. Chou dominated the 12th annual Channel V Music Awards ceremony, which was held 11 January 2006, at Queen Elizabeth Stadium in Hong Kong. In the Taiwan/Hong Kong category, the Sony BMG Hong Kong-signed artist was named best male singer, most popular male singer and best singer/songwriter. Chou also collected the best music video award and received one of the best song of the year awards, both for "Night Song".

In 2004, 2006, 2007 and 2008, he was awarded Best-Selling Chinese Artist by World Music Awards for the albums Common Jasmin Orange, Still Fantasy and On the Run. Chou was named the best Asian artist at the eighth annual CCTV/MTV Music Awards, held 12 October 2006, at the Beijing Exhibition Centre Auditorium. Five Chinese musicians gained exposure for their participation in events associated with the 2008 Olympic Games in Beijing, China, including Jay Chou. Chou won the Favorite Male Artist of the 20th Golden Melody Awards in Taiwan. He did not attend the event to collect the award as he was on tour in mainland China at the time.

== Personal life ==
=== Relationships ===
From 1998, Chou dated singer Devin Wu (formerly known as Peggy Wu), his labelmate at Jacky Wu's Alfa Music, for over a year until a third party intervened. In 2010, Devin Wu told Next Magazine that she lost her virginity to Chou when she was 16 while he was 18.

Chou was romantically linked to Taiwanese singer Jolin Tsai, for whom he composed hit songs such as "Can't Speak Clearly" and "The Prague Square". In December 2001, Tsai and Chou were first spotted dining at an izakaya in Shinjuku, Japan. In February 2005, Chou was spotted shopping with Taiwanese news presenter Patty Hou in Shibuya, Japan. After that, Tsai deliberately avoided meeting Chou and Hou during public events, while Jacky Wu, Chou's former boss, confirmed Chou and Tsai had been dating. This revelation further compounded the feud between Chou and Wu, which began over Wu's sale of Alfa Music. In June 2010, Tsai and Chou made amends, and Tsai appeared as a special guest at Chou's concert in Taipei to much public fanfare. In July 2013, when being interviewed by Taiwanese host Matilda Tao, Tsai admitted for the first time that she had been in a relationship with Chou, revealing that she ended it after discovering his affair with Hou through the news.

In November 2014, Chou confirmed his relationship with model Hannah Quinlivan, who first met Chou when she was 14 and had been working for him as a clothing shop assistant since 2007. The couple had been dating since 2010, and married in July 2014. They held a wedding ceremony on 17 January 2015, one day before Chou's birthday, in Europe. A separate wedding open to friends and family occurred on 9 February in Taipei. A third reception was held in Australia in March. The couple have three children: a daughter born in 2015, a son born in 2017, and a daughter born in 2022.

=== Religion ===
Chou became an Evangelical Protestant Christian as his wife, his mother and some of his friends, including Will Liu and Vanness Wu, are Protestants. He was baptised in 2012.

=== Health ===
Chou suffers from ankylosing spondylitis, which exempted him from Taiwan's military service in 1999. In early 2006, he was accused of evading military service by using falsified medical records and was subsequently investigated by prosecutors. After reviewing Chou's medical records and questioning five medical professionals, the prosecutors concluded that Chou was legitimately exempted due to his medical condition. The case was closed in late 2006 with no charges filed. While declining to disclose the identity of the whistleblower, prosecutors also clarified that they were not a member of the entertainment industry, as Chou had suspected.

== Discography ==
- Jay (2000)
- Fantasy (2001)
- The Eight Dimensions (2002)
- Yeh Hui-Mei (2003)
- Common Jasmine Orange (2004)
- November's Chopin (2005)
- Still Fantasy (2006)
- On the Run! (2007)
- Capricorn (2008)
- The Era (2010)
- Wow! (2011)
- Opus 12 (2012)
- Aiyo, Not Bad (2014)
- Jay Chou's Bedtime Stories (2016)
- Greatest Works of Art (2022)
- Children of the Sun (2026)

== Filmography ==
Films starred

- Initial D (2005)
- Curse of the Golden Flower (2006)
- Kung Fu Dunk (2008)
- The Treasure Hunter (2009)
- True Legend (2010)
- The Green Hornet (2011)
- The Viral Factor (2012)
- Now You See Me 2 (2016)

Films directed and starred in

- Secret (2007)
- The Rooftop (2013)

== Concert tours ==
- Fantasy Tour (2001–2002)
- The One World Tour (2002–2004)
- Incomparable Tour (2004–2006)
- The World Tour (2007–2009)
- The Era World Tour (2010–2011)
- Opus Jay World Tour (2013–2015)
- The Invincible World Tour (2016–2019)
- Carnival World Tour (2019–2025)
- Carnival II World Tour (2026-)

== Enterprises ==
- J Team
- JVR Music

== See also ==
- Forbes China Celebrity 100
- Honorific nicknames in popular music
- List of best-selling albums in Taiwan

== Notes ==
- a. Examples of Chou's Chinese style R&B: "East Wind Breaks" (東風破), "Hair Like Snow" (髮如雪), "Faraway" (千里之外). Examples of Chinese style rock: "Nunchucks" (雙截棍), "Dragon Fist" (龍拳), "Golden Armor" (黃金甲).
- b. Examples of sound effects used in Chou's music: ping pong balls in "Class2 Grade3" (三年二班), touch-tone phone dialing in "Blue Storm" (藍色風暴), helicopter blades in "My Territory" (我的地盤), dripping rain in "You Can Hear" (妳聽得到), and radio static noise in "Nocturne" (夜曲).
- c. Examples of Oriental-style lyrics by Vincent Fang: "Shanghai 1943" (上海一九四三), "Wife" (娘子), and "Chrysanthemum Flower Platform" (菊花台).
- d. Examples of romantic lyrics by Vincent Fang: "Love Before Anno Domini" (愛在西元前), "Nocturne" (夜曲), "Common Jasmin Orange" (七里香), and "Perfectionist" (完美主義).
- e. Vincent Fang's lyrics discuss war in "The Last Campaign" (最後的戰役) and "Wounds That End War" (止戰之殤), the Bible in "Blue Storm" (藍色風暴), sports in "Bullfight" (鬥牛) and "Class2 Grade3" (三年二班), and martial arts in "Nunchucks" (雙截棍) and "Ninja" (忍者).
- f. Examples of Vivian Hsu's work: "Adorable Woman" (可愛女人), "Tornado" (龍捲風), and "Simple Love" (簡單愛).
- g. Examples of romantic lyrics by Jay Chou: "Black Humor" (黑色幽默), "Silence" (安靜), "Iron Box of an Peninsula" (半島鐵盒), "Fine Day" (晴天), "Excuse" (藉口), "Black Sweater" (黑色毛衣), and "White Windmills" (白色風車).
- h. "Snail" (蝸牛) and "Listen To Mother's Words" (聽媽媽的話).
- i. Golden Melody Awards: "...the Chinese pop music industry's equivalent of the Grammy Awards in the US are held annually to award professionals making music in Mandarin, Taiwanese, Hakka and any of Taiwan's Aboriginal languages."
- j. A similar book was published in Japanese, titled Grandeur de D major – Jay Chou Photo Essay (ISBN 4-901873-50-4).
