= Carnival World Tour =

2019–25 concert tour by Jay Chou

The Carnival World Tour
- Tour by Jay Chou
- Location: Asia; Australia; Europe
- Associated album: Various
- Start date: October 17, 2019
- End date: October 11, 2025
- No. of shows: 110

Jay Chou concert chronology
- The Invincible World Tour (2016–2019); The Carnival World Tour (2019–2025); Carnival II World Tour (2026–)

The Carnival World Tour (Chinese: 嘉年華世界巡迴演唱會) is the eighth concert tour by Taiwanese recording artist Jay Chou. The tour began in Shanghai at the Mercedes-Benz Arena on October 17, 2019, and spans 110 dates in Asia, Oceania, and Europe. Initially halted by the COVID-19 pandemic in January 2020, the concert tour resumed in Singapore in December 2022. It concluded at the Shanghai Stadium on October 11, 2025.

Chinese media sources have highlighted the surge in economic activities and the significant boost in tourism experienced by the cities that were visited by the Carnival World Tour.

== Commercial performance ==
=== General sale ===
Over 890,000 users were recorded queuing for the Taipei Dome concerts scheduled for December 2024, with Tuoyuan Ticketing System commenting, "We used more than 10,000 virtual machines and the largest bandwidth in history". 150,000 tickets for the four shows were sold out in five minutes.

== Economic impact ==
=== Civil transport ===
Chou's concerts in Shanghai in October 2023 brought elevated economic effects to the city's tourism sector. According to statistics from Tongcheng Travel, despite the tourism off-season following the Mid-Autumn Festival and National Day holidays, the bookings of hotels in Shanghai from October 12 to 15 ranked amongst the top three nationwide, surging approximately 80%. Demand for taxi travel in the Shanghai area increased by more than 70%, while the demand to and from the Shanghai Stadium increased by as much as 300%. Demand for trips to and from large transportation hubs such as airports and train stations in the city increased by 110%.

=== Tourism ===
In Haikou, Hainan, the tour brought a significant tourism boost to the city. The concerts attracted 95,100 tourists from outside of the province and brought ¥976 million (US$134 million) in tourism revenue, nearly triple the amount earned during the Dragon Boat Festival and ¥100 million more than during Labour Day.

In Tianjin and Hohhot, the Carnival World Tour brought ¥3 billion and ¥2.88 billion in tourism revenue, respectively. More than 100,000 tourists travelled to Taiyuan, Shanxi to attend the concerts. Tourist attractions in Fuzhou saw a significant increase in visitors due to the tour; the Sanfang Qixiang saw a 77% increase in foot traffic, Yantai Mountain saw an increase of 64%, whereas West Lake Park saw an increase of 90.4% in visitors.

== Tour dates ==
List of concert dates
Date	City	Country	Venue	Attendance
October 17, 2019	Shanghai	China	Mercedes-Benz Arena	—
October 18, 2019	Shanghai	China	Mercedes-Benz Arena	—
October 19, 2019	Shanghai	China	Mercedes-Benz Arena	—
October 20, 2019	Shanghai	China	Mercedes-Benz Arena	—
October 26, 2019	Jinan	China	Jinan Olympic Sports Center Stadium	—
October 27, 2019	Jinan	China	Jinan Olympic Sports Center Stadium	—
November 2, 2019	Nanjing	China	Nanjing Olympic Sports Centre	—
November 3, 2019	Nanjing	China	Nanjing Olympic Sports Centre	—
November 9, 2019	Changsha	China	Helong Sports Center Stadium	—
November 10, 2019	Changsha	China	Helong Sports Center Stadium	—
November 16, 2019	Hangzhou	China	Yellow Dragon Sports Centre Stadium	—
November 17, 2019	Hangzhou	China	Yellow Dragon Sports Centre Stadium	—
November 23, 2019	Xiamen	China	Xiamen Sports Centre Stadium	—
November 24, 2019	Xiamen	China	Xiamen Sports Centre Stadium	—
December 29, 2019	Shenzhen	China	Shenzhen Universiade Sports Centre	88,000
December 30, 2019	Shenzhen	China	Shenzhen Universiade Sports Centre	88,000
January 10, 2020	Singapore		National Stadium	—
January 11, 2020	Singapore		National Stadium	—
December 17, 2022	Singapore		National Stadium	60,000
December 18, 2022	Singapore		National Stadium	60,000
January 15, 2023	Kuala Lumpur	Malaysia	Bukit Jalil National Stadium	45,000
March 4, 2023	Sydney	Australia	Sydney Showground Stadium	24,000
May 5, 2023	Hong Kong		Central Harbourfront Event Space	—
May 6, 2023	Hong Kong		Central Harbourfront Event Space	—
May 7, 2023	Hong Kong		Central Harbourfront Event Space	—
May 10, 2023	Hong Kong		Central Harbourfront Event Space	—
May 11, 2023	Hong Kong		Central Harbourfront Event Space	—
May 13, 2023	Hong Kong		Central Harbourfront Event Space	—
May 14, 2023	Hong Kong		Central Harbourfront Event Space	20,000
June 29, 2023	Haikou	China	Wuyuan River Stadium	154,600
June 30, 2023	Haikou	China	Wuyuan River Stadium	154,600
July 1, 2023	Haikou	China	Wuyuan River Stadium	154,600
July 2, 2023	Haikou	China	Wuyuan River Stadium	154,600
August 17, 2023	Hohhot	China	Hohhot City Stadium	184,000
August 18, 2023	Hohhot	China	Hohhot City Stadium	184,000
August 19, 2023	Hohhot	China	Hohhot City Stadium	184,000
August 20, 2023	Hohhot	China	Hohhot City Stadium	184,000
September 7, 2023	Tianjin	China	Tianjin Olympic Center	185,000
September 8, 2023	Tianjin	China	Tianjin Olympic Center	185,000
September 9, 2023	Tianjin	China	Tianjin Olympic Center	185,000
September 10, 2023	Tianjin	China	Tianjin Olympic Center	185,000
September 21, 2023	Taiyuan	China	Shanxi Sports Centre Stadium	—
September 22, 2023	Taiyuan	China	Shanxi Sports Centre Stadium	—
September 23, 2023	Taiyuan	China	Shanxi Sports Centre Stadium	—
September 24, 2023	Taiyuan	China	Shanxi Sports Centre Stadium	—
October 12, 2023	Shanghai	China	Shanghai Stadium	320,000
October 13, 2023	Shanghai	China	Shanghai Stadium	320,000
October 14, 2023	Shanghai	China	Shanghai Stadium	320,000
October 15, 2023	Shanghai	China	Shanghai Stadium	320,000
December 8, 2023	Bangkok	Thailand	Rajamangala Stadium	70,000
December 9, 2023	Bangkok	Thailand	Rajamangala Stadium	70,000
January 9, 2024	London	United Kingdom	The O2 Arena	—
January 10, 2024	London	United Kingdom	The O2 Arena	—
January 13, 2024	Paris	France	Paris La Défense Arena	—
March 2, 2024	Sydney	Australia	Sydney Showground Stadium	—
March 16, 2024	Melbourne	Australia	Rod Laver Arena	—
March 17, 2024	Melbourne	Australia	Rod Laver Arena	—
April 6, 2024	Yokohama	Japan	K-Arena Yokohama	—
April 7, 2024	Yokohama	Japan	K-Arena Yokohama	—
April 18, 2024	Hangzhou	China	Hangzhou Olympic Sports Expo Center	200,000
April 19, 2024	Hangzhou	China	Hangzhou Olympic Sports Expo Center	200,000
April 20, 2024	Hangzhou	China	Hangzhou Olympic Sports Expo Center	200,000
April 21, 2024	Hangzhou	China	Hangzhou Olympic Sports Expo Center	200,000
May 16, 2024	Fuzhou	China	Haixia Olympic Center	—
May 17, 2024	Fuzhou	China	Haixia Olympic Center	—
May 18, 2024	Fuzhou	China	Haixia Olympic Center	—
May 19, 2024	Fuzhou	China	Haixia Olympic Center	—
May 30, 2024	Changsha	China	Helong Sports Center Stadium	148,900
May 31, 2024	Changsha	China	Helong Sports Center Stadium	148,900
June 1, 2024	Changsha	China	Helong Sports Center Stadium	148,900
June 2, 2024	Changsha	China	Helong Sports Center Stadium	148,900
September 12, 2024	Shenzhen	China	Shenzhen Universiade Sports Centre	—
September 13, 2024	Shenzhen	China	Shenzhen Universiade Sports Centre	—
September 14, 2024	Shenzhen	China	Shenzhen Universiade Sports Centre	—
September 15, 2024	Shenzhen	China	Shenzhen Universiade Sports Centre	—
September 26, 2024	Nanjing	China	Nanjing Olympic Sports Centre	—
September 27, 2024	Nanjing	China	Nanjing Olympic Sports Centre	—
September 28, 2024	Nanjing	China	Nanjing Olympic Sports Centre	—
September 29, 2024	Nanjing	China	Nanjing Olympic Sports Centre	—
October 11, 2024	Singapore		National Stadium	—
October 12, 2024	Singapore		National Stadium	28,000
October 13, 2024	Singapore		National Stadium	—
October 26, 2024	Kuala Lumpur	Malaysia	Bukit Jalil National Stadium	60,000
December 5, 2024	Taipei	Taiwan	Taipei Dome	152,000
December 6, 2024	Taipei	Taiwan	Taipei Dome	152,000
December 7, 2024	Taipei	Taiwan	Taipei Dome	152,000
December 8, 2024	Taipei	Taiwan	Taipei Dome	152,000
January 4, 2025	Dubai	United Arab Emirates	Coca-Cola Arena	—
January 5, 2025	Dubai	United Arab Emirates	Coca-Cola Arena	—
March 28, 2025	Sanya	China	Sanya Sports Center Stadium	127,400
March 29, 2025	Sanya	China	Sanya Sports Center Stadium	127,400
March 30, 2025	Sanya	China	Sanya Sports Center Stadium	127,400
April 25, 2025	Nanning	China	Guangxi Sports Center Stadium	142,000
April 26, 2025	Nanning	China	Guangxi Sports Center Stadium	142,000
April 27, 2025	Nanning	China	Guangxi Sports Center Stadium	142,000
June 27, 2025	Hong Kong		Kai Tak Stadium	120,000
June 28, 2025	Hong Kong		Kai Tak Stadium	120,000
June 29, 2025	Hong Kong		Kai Tak Stadium	120,000
July 11, 2025	Xiamen	China	Xiamen Sports Centre Stadium	—
July 12, 2025	Xiamen	China	Xiamen Sports Centre Stadium	—
July 13, 2025	Xiamen	China	Xiamen Sports Centre Stadium	—
September 19, 2025	Jinan	China	Jinan Olympic Sports Center Stadium	—
September 20, 2025	Jinan	China	Jinan Olympic Sports Center Stadium	—
September 21, 2025	Jinan	China	Jinan Olympic Sports Center Stadium	—
September 26, 2025	Wuhan	China	Wuhan Sports Centre Stadium	—
September 27, 2025	Wuhan	China	Wuhan Sports Centre Stadium	—
September 28, 2025	Wuhan	China	Wuhan Sports Centre Stadium	—
October 9, 2025	Shanghai	China	Shanghai Stadium	180,000
October 10, 2025	Shanghai	China	Shanghai Stadium	180,000
October 11, 2025	Shanghai	China	Shanghai Stadium	180,000
Total				N/A
