= Jay Chou's Bedtime Stories =

- Digital cover

Studio album by Jay Chou
- Released: 24 June 2016
- Recorded: 2014–2016
- Genres: Pop; R&B
- Length: 37:53
- Language: Mandarin
- Label: JVR Music
- Producer: Jay Chou

Jay Chou chronology
Opus Jay World Tour (2016)	Jay Chou's Bedtime Stories (2016)	The Invincible Concert Tour (2019)

Singles from Jay Chou's Bedtime Stories
- 1. "Shouldn't Be" Released: 17 June 2016; 2. "Failure at Love" Released: 29 June 2016; 3. "Love Confession" Released: 28 October 2016

Jay Chou's Bedtime Stories (traditional Chinese: 周杰倫的床邊故事; simplified Chinese: 周杰伦的床边故事; pinyin: Zhōu Jiélún Chuángbiān Gùshì) is the fourteenth studio album by Taiwanese singer-songwriter Jay Chou, released on 24 June 2016, by JVR Music. The album was self-produced by Chou, who wrote the album with his long-time collaborator Vincent Fang and Alang Huang. The singer envisioned Jay Chou's Bedtime Stories as an audiobook, where he narrates ten music stories. Its composition primarily utilizes pop and R&B styles.

The album was subject to positive reviews from music critics, praising its musical styles and production quality. It reached number one on the Hong Kong album chart and number three on the US World Albums chart published by Billboard. In China, the digital album recorded over 2 million units in sales.

The album produced the songs "Shouldn't Be", which features Taiwanese singer A-Mei, as well as "Failure of Love", and "Love Confession". It was nominated for three Golden Melody Awards in Taiwan, and won Best Mandarin Album of the Year at the 2017 Chinese Music Awards. Chou embarked on the Invincible World Tour a week after the release of the album, which spanned shows across Asia, Europe, North America, and Oceania.

== Background and release ==
Jay Chou's Bedtime Stories was produced over a span of 18 months. Initially, the album title and promotional photos were set to be revealed on 6 June 2016, but they were leaked online on 2 June. Chou's record company, JVR, announced their intention to pursue legal action, but it was later discovered that the source of the leak was the iTunes pre-order page.

Chou envisioned the album to resemble that of an audiobook, with him narrating ten imaginative music stories. The album cover was designed by Chou himself, the first time he had done so since November's Chopin (2005). It was shot on the set built for the "Bedtime Stories" music video. Under the large clock on the wall, Chou sits in the middle of an old house while narrating the album's stories.

== Composition and songs ==
The lyrics of "Bedtime Stories" are about various bedtime stories being told to children. "Let's Go" incorporates the elements of American cowboy folk music into the structure of rock music. The lyrics speak about one's urge to travel freely without boundaries. "A Little Bit" is a slower song incorporating piano and strings. The lyrics speak of a man who never paid any attention to his girlfriend, who then eventually leaves him. "Lover of Past Life" is a song dedicated to his daughter, with its lyrics describing Chou's unceasing love for his daughter and what's in store for her future. The song is in 3/4 time, and features a R&B rock beat. Chou wrote the song after hearing his daughter play only a few notes on a toy piano.

"Hero" is a rock song with heavily incorporated electric guitar. This song was made for the online multiplayer game, League of Legends. "Shouldn't Be" is a duet between Jay Chou and A-Mei. This song begins with piano, but later incorporates electronic sounds. The lyrics are about how fate does not allow two lovers to be together. It was featured in Ice Fantasy as the opening theme. "Turkish Ice Cream" is a mixture of rock, hip-hop, and a tinge of middle eastern elements, while its lyrics emphasize how Chou can do anything he wants with his songs. The music video features NBA star and friend Jeremy Lin.

The lyrics of "Love Confession" describe someone wanting to confess their love to another. The music video is set in Paris, with clips of Jay Chou singing along the Seine River. "Now You See Me" was featured in the Hollywood film Now You See Me 2, which Chou made a cameo in. This song blends Chinese folk elements with a modern hip-hop rhythm, and contains influences from Arabian and Indian musical styles. The music video for the ballad track "Failure at Love" features Chou walking through Prague in the winter.

== Commercial performance ==
Jay Chou's Bedtime Stories peaked at number one on the Hong Kong Record Merchants Association (HKRMA) album chart. It also reached number three on the Billboard US World Albums chart during the chart issue dated 16 July 2016, marking his second entry on the chart.

== Promotion and tour ==
On 30 June 2016, Chou embarked on The Invincible World Tour with four consecutive shows at the Mercedes-Benz Arena in Shanghai, China. It spanned 120 shows across Asia, Europe, North America, and Oceania, attracting a total of 3 million people.

== Awards ==
Awards and nominations
Year	Award	Category	Nominated work	Result	Ref.
2017	Chinese Music Awards	Best Mandarin Album	Jay Chou's Bedtime Stories	Won	
2017	Golden Melody Awards	Best Male Vocalist Mandarin	Jay Chou's Bedtime Stories	Nominated	
2017	Golden Melody Awards	Song of the Year	"Love Confession"	Nominated	
2017	Golden Melody Awards	Best Music Video	"Bedtime Stories"	Nominated	

== Track listing ==
All music is composed by Jay Chou.

Jay Chou's Bedtime Stories track listing
No.	Title	Lyrics	Length
1.	"Bedtime Stories" (床邊故事)	Vincent Fang	3:46
2.	"Let's Go" (說走就走)	Vincent Fang	4:26
3.	"A Little Bit" (一點點)	Vincent Fang	3:42
4.	"Lover of Past Life" (前世情人)	Alang Huang	3:20
5.	"Hero" (英雄)	Jay Chou	3:21
6.	"Shouldn't Be" (不該; with A-Mei From Ice Fantasy Theme Songs)	Vincent Fang	4:50
7.	"Turkish Ice Cream" (土耳其冰淇淋)	Jay Chou	3:15
8.	"Love Confession" (告白氣球)	Vincent Fang	3:35
9.	"Now You See Me"	Vincent Fang	2:54
10.	"Failure at Love" (愛情廢柴)	Jay Chou	4:45
Total length:			37:53

== Personnel ==
- Jay Chou - vocals, producer
- Vincent Fang - lyricist (1, 2, 3, 6, 8, 9)
- Patrick Brasca - vocals, guitarist (Track 8)
- Yanis Huang - music arrangement (1-6, 9, 10)
- Jeremy Lin - special guest (Track 7)

== Charts ==
=== Weekly charts ===
Chart (2016)	Peak position
Hong Kong Albums (HKRMA)	1
US World Albums (Billboard)	3

=== Year-end charts ===
Chart (2016)	Position
Taiwanese Albums (Note: Best-selling albums of the year in Taiwan as reported by media outlets)	2
