= Xiamen People's Stadium =

Multi-use stadium in Xiamen, China

Coordinates: 24.4631°N 118.0816°E

The Xiamen People's Stadium (Chinese: 厦门市人民体育场; Pe̍h-ōe-jī: E mng chhi the iok tiuⁿ) is a multi-use stadium in Xiamen, China. It is currently used mostly for football matches and athletics events. The stadium has a capacity of 7,000 people.

== See also ==
- List of football stadiums in China
- List of stadiums in China
- Lists of stadiums
