= Patrick Brasca =

Taiwanese Canadian singer

Patrick Brasca 派偉俊
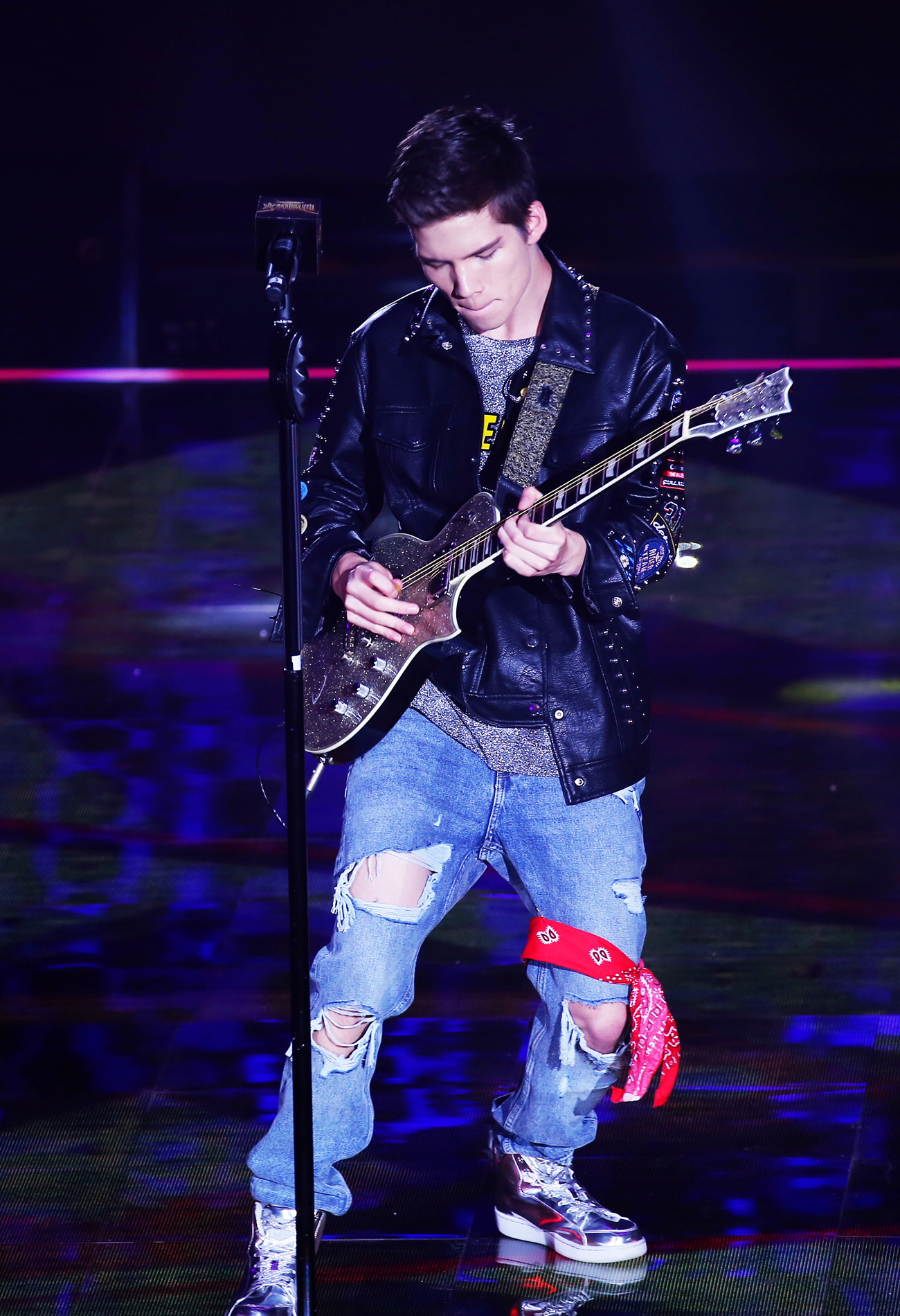

Background information
- Born: 林煒竣; September 6, 1999 (age 27); Tamshui, Taipei County, Taiwan
- Origin: Taiwan
- Genre: Pop
- Occupation: Singer
- Years active: 2009–present
- Label: JVR Music

Chinese name
- Traditional Chinese: 派偉俊
- Simplified Chinese: 派伟俊
Transcriptions
Standard Mandarin
- Hanyu Pinyin: Pài Wěijùn
- Wade–Giles: Pʻai^{4} Wei^{3}-chün^{4}

Real name
- Traditional Chinese: 林煒竣
- Simplified Chinese: 林炜竣
Transcriptions
Standard Mandarin
- Hanyu Pinyin: Lín Wěijùn
- Wade–Giles: Lin^{2} Wei^{3}-chün^{4}

Patrick Brasca (Chinese: 林煒竣; pinyin: Lín Wěijùn, born September 6, 1999) known professionally in Chinese as Pai Weijun (派偉俊) is a Canadian-Taiwanese pop singer and songwriter known for singing the theme song "Try" of the film Kung Fu Panda 3.

== Career ==
Patrick Brasca is of mixed Italian and Taiwanese heritage. He learned African drums when he was just three and learned the acoustic guitar when he was 9. At the age of 11, he had already set his hopes on becoming a singer. At the mere age of 13, while taking part in a variety show hosted by Harlem Yu, Brasca met Jay Chou, who signed him to his record company JVR Music. Brasca also uses the mononym Patrick in some of his recordings.

On 29 October 2015, he released the single "Can't Lose You Now" (Chinese: 保護你) with an accompanying music video. It became part of the soundtrack of popular Taiwanese TV series Love or Spend (Chinese: 戀愛鄰距離; pinyin: liàn'ài lín jù lí). Brasca followed up this release with "My Time" (我的時代) on 20 November 2015 and "I Like You" on 17 December 2015. The two songs were included on his first EP single also called My Time in 2015.

The Taiwanese musician, pop singer, songwriter, record producer, director and actor Jay Chou suggested that Brasca become part of the soundtrack of 2016 animated action comedy martial arts film Kung Fu Panda 3, produced by DreamWorks Animation and Oriental DreamWorks. The bilingual theme song from the film titled "Try" featured Patrick Brasca (in English) and Jay Chou (in Chinese). Brasca took part in the writing of the English lyrics of the track. The soundtrack album was released on January 22, 2016 with Brasca and Jay Chou's "Try" as its title track. In January 2025, he release another song named "Six Degrees" with Jay Chou, who previously collaborate since Try.

== In popular culture ==
Brasca sang "Be Strong", the theme song for the 2016 International Children's Games held in New Taipei City in Taiwan.

== Albums ==
- Angst (Chinese: 燥熱) (2020)
  - [10 tracks: Butterflies (Chinese: 蝴蝶) (2:51) / Champagne (Chinese: 香檳配你的美) feat. ANGIE (3:06) / I Like The Way (Chinese: 偷渡) (3:40) / Somebody (2:44) / Don't Wanna Lie ft. 8lak & Hosea (2:53) / You Are (2:53) / Won't Say I Love You (Chinese: 我不說愛你) (2:48) / Matches (Chinese: 火柴) (2:50) / Runaway (2:50) / Angst (Chinese: 燥熱) (2:58)]

=== EPs ===
- My Time (2015)
  - [2 track EP: "Can't Lose You Now" (4:07) / "My Time (4:03)]

=== Songs and music videos ===
- "Love Confession" (with Jay Chou) (2016)
- "Soar High" (Chinese: 飛得更高) (2019)
- "Don't Wanna Lie" (feat. 8lak, Hosea) (2020)
- "4 Get Bout U" (Chinese: 忘記你) (with Tyson Yoshi) (2020)
- "Butterfly" (Chinese: 蝴蝶) (2020)
- "Somebody" (2020)
- "Champagne" (Chinese: 香檳配你的美) (feat. ANGIE) (2020)
- "I Like the Way" (Chinese: 偷渡) (2020)
- "Runaway" (2021)
- "Cold" feat. @莫宰羊 (2021)
- "Hold On" (with 高爾宣OSN) (2024)
- "Six Degrees" (with Jay Chou) (2025)
- “1000 Times+1" feat. mac ova seas (2025)
- "Unsent" feat. Chen Hua (2025)
- "Touch the Screen to Miss You" (with 911) (2026)
- "Gold Rush Town" (with Jay Chou) (2026)

=== Soundtracks ===
Love or Spend (2015)

- "Can't Lose You Now" (Chinese: 保護你)
- "My Time" (Chinese: 我的時代)
- "I Like You" (Chinese: 我喜歡你)

Kung Fu Panda 3 (2016)

- "Try" (with Jay Chou)

Superpower (2017)

- "Superpower" (2017) (closing song)

GunGirls (2017)

- "Gun Fire" (Chinese: 戰鬥吧槍娘) (closing song)

Dream Breaker (2018)

- "City of Dreams" (Chinese: 不醒之城)

=== Remix ===
- Jay Chou – 忍者 (Patrick Brasca x MADREX Remix) (2019)

=== Others ===
- "Be Strong" (theme song of the 2016 International Children's Games) (2016)
- "奇市江湖" (theme song of the 2017 Taobao Marketplace Festival)

== Filmography ==
- Kung Fu Panda 3 (2016)

== See Also ==
- JVR Music
