= List of songs recorded by Jay Chou =

Taiwanese singer-songwriter Jay Chou has written and performed over 150 songs and has written or co-written every song in his fifteen-album discography. He has also recorded songs for film soundtracks, including for the film Secret (2007) and The Rooftop (2013). Many of his songs have achieved record chart success across various countries in Asia, and some have re-entered the charts in multiple regions years or even decades after their initial release.

== List of songs ==
Year	Album	Track	Track title	Lyricist	Music genre/style	Major instrument(s)	Lyrics theme/style
2000	Jay 杰倫	1-01	Adorable Lady 可愛女人	Vivian Hsu	R&B	Guitar (acoustic)	Romance
2000	Jay 杰倫	1-02	Perfectionism 完美主義	Vincent Fang	R&B	Piano	Romance
2000	Jay 杰倫	1-03	Starry Mood 星晴	Jay Chou	R&B	Guitar (acoustic)	Romance
2000	Jay 杰倫	1-04	Wife 娘子	Vincent Fang	"Zhong guo feng", hip-hop	Guitar (acoustic)	Romance
2000	Jay 杰倫	1-05	Basketball Match 鬥牛	Vincent Fang	Hip-hop	Synthesizer	Competition, sportsmanship, basketball
2000	Jay 杰倫	1-06	Black Humor 黑色幽默	Jay Chou	R&B	Piano	Romance
2000	Jay 杰倫	1-07	Istanbul 伊斯坦堡	Vivian Hsu	R&B	Synthesizer	Romance
2000	Jay 杰倫	1-08	Ancient Indian Turtledove 印地安老斑鳩	Vincent Fang	Hip-hop	Synthesizer	Humor
2000	Jay 杰倫	1-09	Tornado 龍捲風	Vivian Hsu	R&B	Guitar, piano, violin	Romance, tornado
2000	Jay 杰倫	1-10	Counter-clockwise Clock 反方向的鐘	Vincent Fang	R&B, hip-hop	Piano, guitar (acoustic, electric), synthesizer	Romance
2001	Fantasy 范特西	2-01	Love Before BC 愛在西元前	Vincent Fang	R&B	Guitar (acoustic)	Romance
2001	Fantasy 范特西	2-02	Dad, I'm Home 爸，我回來了	Jay Chou	Hip hop soul	Violin, cello, guitar (acoustic)	Family, domestic violence
2001	Fantasy 范特西	2-03	Simple Love 簡單愛	Vivian Hsu	R&B	Guitar (acoustic)	Romance
2001	Fantasy 范特西	2-04	Ninja 忍者	Vincent Fang	Rock	Synthesizer	Combat, ninja
2001	Fantasy 范特西	2-05	Hard to Say it Out 開不了口	Vivian Hsu	R&B	Guitar (acoustic), violin, cello	Romance
2001	Fantasy 范特西	2-06	Shanghai 1943 上海一九四三	Vincent Fang	R&B	Guitar (acoustic)	Chinese history, family
2001	Fantasy 范特西	2-07	Sorry 對不起	Vincent Fang	R&B	Guitar (acoustic)	Romance
2001	Fantasy 范特西	2-08	William Castle 威廉古堡	Vincent Fang	Electronic, hip-hop	Synthesizer, organ	Humor, vampires
2001	Fantasy 范特西	2-09	Nunchucks 雙截棍	Vincent Fang	"Zhong guo feng", rock	Guitar (electric), erhu	Combat
2001	Fantasy 范特西	2-10	Silence 安靜	Jay Chou	R&B	Piano, violin, cello	Romance
2002	The Eight Dimensions 八度空間	3-01	Half-Beast Human 半獸人	Vincent Fang	Hip-hop, orchestral	Orchestra, synthesizer	Fantasy, Warcraft
2002	The Eight Dimensions 八度空間	3-02	Peninsula Ironbox 半島鐵盒	Jay Chou	R&B	Guitar (acoustic)	Romance
2002	The Eight Dimensions 八度空間	3-03	Secret Sign 暗號	Xu Shi Chang 許世昌	R&B	Guitar (acoustic)	Romance
2002	The Eight Dimensions 八度空間	3-04	Dragon Fist 龍拳	Vincent Fang	"Zhong guo feng", rock	Guitar (electric)	Chinese pride, Chinese history
2002	The Eight Dimensions 八度空間	3-05	The Train's Destination 火車叨位去	Vincent Fang	R&B, hip-hop	Guitar (acoustic)	Romance, trains
2002	The Eight Dimensions 八度空間	3-06	Split/Leave 分裂/离开	Jay Chou	R&B	Piano, violin, cello	Academic failure
2002	The Eight Dimensions 八度空間	3-07	Grandpa's Tea 爺爺泡的茶	Vincent Fang	Pop	Guitar (acoustic), violin	Family, grandfather
2002	The Eight Dimensions 八度空間	3-08	Back to the Past 回到過去	Will Liu 劉耕宏	R&B	Guitar (acoustic)	Romance
2002	The Eight Dimensions 八度空間	3-09	Little Blacksmith in Milan 米蘭小鐵匠	Vincent Fang	Hip-hop	Guitar (acoustic)	Humor
2002	The Eight Dimensions 八度空間	3-10	The Last Battle 最後的戰役	Vincent Fang	R&B, orchestral	Guitar (acoustic), violin, cello	War, friendship, death
2003	Yeh Hui-mei 葉惠美	4-01	In the Name of Father 以父之名	Alang Huang	Hip hop soul	Guitar (acoustic), synthesizer	Sin, forgiveness
2003	Yeh Hui-mei 葉惠美	4-02	Coward 懦夫	Jay Chou	Rock	Guitar (electric)	Drug addiction
2003	Yeh Hui-mei 葉惠美	4-03	Sunny Day 晴天	Jay Chou	Rock	Guitar (acoustic)	Romance
2003	Yeh Hui-mei 葉惠美	4-04	Class 3-2 三年二班	Vincent Fang	Hip-hop	Violin, cello, guitar (bass)	Competition, sportsmanship, Ping-Pong
2003	Yeh Hui-mei 葉惠美	4-05	Dong Feng Po 東風破	Vincent Fang	"Zhong guo feng", R&B	Erhu, pipa	Romance
2003	Yeh Hui-mei 葉惠美	4-06	You Hear Me 妳聽得到	Zeng Yu Ting 曾郁婷	R&B	Piano, synthesizer	Romance
2003	Yeh Hui-mei 葉惠美	4-07	Same Tone 同一種調調	Vincent Fang	Hip-hop, tango	Violin, guitar (acoustic)	Friendship
2003	Yeh Hui-mei 葉惠美	4-08	Her Eyelashes 她的睫毛	Vincent Fang	Soft rock	Guitar (electric)	Romance
2003	Yeh Hui-mei 葉惠美	4-09	Cliff 愛情懸崖	Vivian Hsu	R&B	Piano, violin, cello, guitar (electric)	Romance
2003	Yeh Hui-mei 葉惠美	4-10	Terrace Field 梯田	Jay Chou	Hip-hop	Piano, horn	Eco-awareness, urbanization
2003	Yeh Hui-mei 葉惠美	4-11	Double Blade 雙刀	Vincent Fang	Rock	Guitar (electric), violin, cello	Revenge, combat
2004	Common Jasmine Orange 七里香	5-01	My Territory 我的地盤	Vincent Fang	Pop, hip-hop	Piano, harpsichord, scratch	Individualism
2004	Common Jasmine Orange 七里香	5-02	Common Jasmine Orange 七里香	Vincent Fang	R&B	Guitar (acoustic), violin, cello	Romance
2004	Common Jasmine Orange 七里香	5-03	Excuse 藉口	Jay Chou	Soft rock	Piano	Romance
2004	Common Jasmine Orange 七里香	5-04	Grandma 外婆	Jay Chou	R&B	Synthesizer	Family, grandmother, failure
2004	Common Jasmine Orange 七里香	5-05	General 將軍	Alang Huang	"Zhong guo feng", hip-hop	Violin, synthesizer	Chinese chess
2004	Common Jasmine Orange 七里香	5-06	Step Aside 擱淺	Devon Song 宋健彰	R&B	Piano, violin, cello	Romance
2004	Common Jasmine Orange 七里香	5-07	Chaotic Dance 亂舞春秋	Vincent Fang	"Zhong guo feng", hip-hop	Guitar (acoustic), guzheng, scratch, synthesizer	Humor, Chinese history
2004	Common Jasmine Orange 七里香	5-08	Struggle 困獸之鬥	Will Liu 劉耕宏	Rock	Guitar (electric), harmonica	Personal struggles
2004	Common Jasmine Orange 七里香	5-09	Fun Fair 園遊會	Vincent Fang 方文山	R&B	Guitar (acoustic), synthesizer	Romance
2004	Common Jasmine Orange 七里香	5-10	Wounds of War 止戰之殤	Vincent Fang	R&B, classical	Piano	War, children
2005	November's Chopin; 11月的蕭邦	6-01	Nocturne 夜曲	Vincent Fang	R&B	Guitar (acoustic), piano	Romance, death
2005	November's Chopin; 11月的蕭邦	6-02	Blue Storm 藍色風暴	Vincent Fang	Rock	Guitar (electric), scratch	Bible
2005	November's Chopin; 11月的蕭邦	6-03	Hair Like Snow 髮如雪	Vincent Fang	"Zhong guo feng", R&B	Pipa, yangqin, synthesizer	Romance
2005	November's Chopin; 11月的蕭邦	6-04	Black Sweater 黑色毛衣	Jay Chou	R&B	Guitar (acoustic)	Romance
2005	November's Chopin; 11月的蕭邦	6-05	Surrounded 四面楚歌	Jay Chou	Hip-hop	Violin, Cello, synthesizer	Life, paparazzi
2005	November's Chopin; 11月的蕭邦	6-06	Maple Leaf 楓	Devon Song 宋健彰	R&B	Piano, violin, cello	Romance
2005	November's Chopin; 11月的蕭邦	6-07	Romantic Cellphone 浪漫手機	Vincent Fang	R&B	Guitar (electric)	Romance
2005	November's Chopin; 11月的蕭邦	6-08	Against 逆鱗	Alang Huang	Hip-hop, orchestral	Orchestra	Motivational
2005	November's Chopin; 11月的蕭邦	6-09	Malt Sugar 麥芽糖	Vincent Fang	R&B	Violin, guitar (electric)	Romance
2005	November's Chopin; 11月的蕭邦	6-10	Coral Sea 珊瑚海	Vincent Fang	R&B	Piano, violin, guitar (acoustic, electric)	Romance
2005	November's Chopin; 11月的蕭邦	6-11	Drifting 飄移	Vincent Fang	Electronic, hip-hop	Synthesizer	Competition, car racing
2005	November's Chopin; 11月的蕭邦	6-12	All the Way North 一路向北	Vincent Fang	Soft rock	Guitar (electric)	Romance
2006	Still Fantasy 依然范特西	7-01	Chapter Seven 夜的第七章	Alang Huang	Hip-hop, orchestral	Violin, cello, piano, synthesizer	Detective story
2006	Still Fantasy 依然范特西	7-02	Listen to Mom 聽媽媽的話	Jay Chou	Hip-hop	Piano, harpsichord	Family, mother, filial piety
2006	Still Fantasy 依然范特西	7-03	Far Away 千里之外	Vincent Fang	"Zhong guo feng", R&B	Erhu, piano, pipa	Romance
2006	Still Fantasy 依然范特西	7-04	Chinese Herbal Manual 本草綱目	Vincent Fang	Hip-hop, electronic	Synthesizer	Chinese pride, Chinese medicine
2006	Still Fantasy 依然范特西	7-05	A Step Back 退後	Devon Song 宋健彰	R&B	Piano, guitar (acoustic)	Romance
2006	Still Fantasy 依然范特西	7-06	Moulin Rouge 紅模仿	Jay Chou	Spanish	Guitar (acoustic), trumpet	Individualism, motivational
2006	Still Fantasy 依然范特西	7-07	Rainy Mood 心雨	Vincent Fang	R&B	Violin, cello, piano	Romance
2006	Still Fantasy 依然范特西	7-08	White Windmill 白色風車	Jay Chou	R&B	Violin, synthesizer	Romance
2006	Still Fantasy 依然范特西	7-09	Rosemary 迷迭香	Vincent Fang	Bossanova	Violin, cello, guitar (acoustic)	Romance, attraction
2006	Still Fantasy 依然范特西	7-10	Chrysanthemum Terrace 菊花台	Vincent Fang	"Zhong guo feng", orchestral	Violin, cello, guitar (acoustic), guzheng	Love, family, death
2007	On the Run! 我很忙	8-01	Cowboy on the Run 牛仔很忙	Alang Huang	Country	Violin, guitar (acoustic), banjo	Nonviolent life, alcohol abstinence, cowboy
2007	On the Run! 我很忙	8-02	Rainbow 彩虹	Jay Chou	Soft rock	Guitar (acoustic)	Romance
2007	On the Run! 我很忙	8-03	Blue and White Porcelain 青花瓷	Vincent Fang	"Zhong guo feng"	Guitar (acoustic), guzheng, dizi	Romance
2007	On the Run! 我很忙	8-04	Sunshine Nerd 陽光宅男	Vincent Fang	Rock	Piano, guitar (electric)	Relationship advice
2007	On the Run! 我很忙	8-05	A Dandelion's Promise 蒲公英的約定	Vincent Fang	Soft rock	Piano, strings	Romance, reminiscence
2007	On the Run! 我很忙	8-06	Incomparable 無雙	Vincent Fang	Rock	Guitar (electric), synthesizer, piano	Fantasy, competition
2007	On the Run! 我很忙	8-07	Not Good Enough For You/Distance 我不配/距離	Vincent Fang	Soft rock	Guitar (acoustic), piano	Romance
2007	On the Run! 我很忙	8-08	Pull Apart 扯	Vincent Fang	Hip-hop	Synthesizer	Stupidity, Chinese yo-yo
2007	On the Run! 我很忙	8-09	Sweet 甜甜的	Vincent Fang	Pop	Guitar (acoustic), piano	Romance
2007	On the Run! 我很忙	8-10	The Longest Movie 最長的電影	Jay Chou	Soft rock	Piano, strings	Romance
2008	Capricorn 魔杰座	9-01	Dragon Rider 龍戰騎士	Vincent Fang	Hip hop, Rock	Guitar (acoustic), synthesizer	Dragon war, Romance
2008	Capricorn 魔杰座	9-02	Give Me the Time of a Song 給我一首歌的時間	Jay Chou	R&B	Guitar (electric)	Romance
2008	Capricorn 魔杰座	9-03	Snake Dance 蛇舞	Alang Huang	Hip hop, R&B	Guitar (acoustic)	Romance, Egypt
2008	Capricorn 魔杰座	9-04	Floral Sea 花海	Gu Xiao Li; Linda Huang	Pop	Violin, cello, guitar (bass)	Romance
2008	Capricorn 魔杰座	9-05	Magician 魔術先生	Vincent Fang	Hip-pop	Piano, Trumpet	Humor, Magic
2008	Capricorn 魔杰座	9-06	The Promised Love 說好的幸福呢	Vincent Fang	R&B	Piano, synthesizer	Romance
2008	Capricorn 魔杰座	9-07	Orchid Pavilion 蘭亭序	Vincent Fang	"Zhong guo feng"	Erhu, violin, guitar (acoustic)	Romance
2008	Capricorn 魔杰座	9-08	Drifting Poet 流浪诗人	Vincent Fang	Soft rock, R&B, Country	Guitar (electric), Harmonica	Romance
2008	Capricorn 魔杰座	9-09	Time Machine 時光機	Vincent Fang	Rock	Piano, violin, cello, guitar (electric)	Childhood, Doraemon
2008	Capricorn 魔杰座	9-10	Uncle Joker 喬克叔叔	Alang Huang	Hip-hop	Piano, horn	Humor, Joker, Clown
2008	Capricorn 魔杰座	9-11	Rice Field 稻香	Jay Chou	Folk, R&B	Guitar (electric), violin, cello	Happiness, Memories, Family
2010	The Era 跨時代	10-01	The Era 跨時代	Alang Huang	Electronic, Rap	Piano	Vampire, Upbeat
2010	The Era 跨時代	10-02	Say Goodbye 說了再見	Gu Xiao Li; Linda Huang 黄淩嘉	Soft pop	Piano	Romance, Regret
2010	The Era 跨時代	10-03	Fade Away 煙花易冷	Vincent Fang	"Zhong guo feng"	Piano	Romance
2010	The Era 跨時代	10-04	Free Tutorial Video 免費教學錄影帶	Alang Huang	Rap, Blues	Guitar	Humor, fame
2010	The Era 跨時代	10-05	Long Time No See 好久不見	Jay Chou	R&B	Guitar	Romance
2010	The Era 跨時代	10-06	Rain All Night 雨下一整晚	Vincent Fang	"Zhong guo feng"	Guitar, guzheng	Romance
2010	The Era 跨時代	10-07	Hip-hop Flight Attendant 嘻哈空姐	Vincent Fang	Electronic	Piano	Beauty, Attraction
2010	The Era 跨時代	10-08	Tears of Scattered Emotion 我落淚 情緒零碎	Vincent Fang	Rock	Piano	Romance
2010	The Era 跨時代	10-09	Diary of Love 愛的飛行日記	Vincent Fang	R&B	Guitar	Romance
2010	The Era 跨時代	10-10	Self-directed Act 自導自演	Jay Chou	R&B	Synthesizer, piano	Romance
2010	The Era 跨時代	10-11	Superman Can't Fly 超人不會飛	Jay Chou	R&B	Piano	Fame, Life
2011	Wow! 驚嘆號	11-01	Exclamation Point 驚嘆號	Vincent Fang	Rock	Synthesizer	Pride
2011	Wow! 驚嘆號	11-02	Enchanting Melody 迷魂曲	Vincent Fang	Electronic	Synthesizer	Romance, hypnotism
2011	Wow! 驚嘆號	11-03	Mine Mine	Jay Chou	R&B	Piano	Romance
2011	Wow! 驚嘆號	11-04	Princess Syndrome 公主病	Jay Chou	R&B	Guitar (electric)	Romance
2011	Wow! 驚嘆號	11-05	How Are You 你好嗎	Josh Lo; Chavy Lee	R&B, orchestral	Piano, strings	Romance
2011	Wow! 驚嘆號	11-06	Healing Rice Dumpling 療傷燒肉粽	Jay Chou			Romance, rice dumplings
2011	Wow! 驚嘆號	11-07	Piano of Sorrow 琴傷	Vincent Fang		Piano	Romance
2011	Wow! 驚嘆號	11-08	Sailor Afraid of Water 水手怕水	Alang Huang			Humor, sailor
2011	Wow! 驚嘆號	11-09	Not the End of the World 世界未末日	Vincent Fang			Motivational
2011	Wow! 驚嘆號	11-10	Shadow Play 皮影戲	Action Tang 從從	"Zhong guo feng", R&B	Synthesizer	Humor, Shadow play
2011	Wow! 驚嘆號	11-11	Sports Car Model 超跑女神	Vincent Fang			Beauty, romance, sports car
2012	Opus 12 十二新作	12-01	Four Seasons Train 四季列車	Vincent Fang			Attraction, trains
2012	Opus 12 十二新作	12-02	Sign Language 手語	Jay Chou	Hip-hop		Romance
2012	Opus 12 十二新作	12-03	Eunuch with a Headache 公公偏頭痛	Vincent Fang			Humor, eunuch
2012	Opus 12 十二新作	12-04	Obviously 明明就	Vincent Fang		Piano	Romance
2012	Opus 12 十二新作	12-05	Smile 傻笑	Vincent Fang			Romance
2012	Opus 12 十二新作	12-06	A Larger Cello 比較大的大提琴	Vincent Fang			Humor, country-side
2012	Opus 12 十二新作	12-07	Love You No Matter What 愛你沒差	Linda Huang			Romance
2012	Opus 12 十二新作	12-08	Mundane Inn 紅塵客棧	Vincent Fang	"Zhong guo feng"		Romance
2012	Opus 12 十二新作	12-09	Dream 夢想啟動	Kevin Lin			Motivational
2012	Opus 12 十二新作	12-10	Big Ben 大笨鐘	Jay Chou			Romance
2012	Opus 12 十二新作	12-11	You Are Everywhere 哪裡都是你	Jay Chou			Romance
2012	Opus 12 十二新作	12-12	Ukulele 烏克麗麗	Jay Chou			Humor, summer
2014	Aiyo, Not Bad 哎呦，不錯哦	13-01	Yang-Ming Mountain 陽明山	Vincent Fang			Humor, friendship
2014	Aiyo, Not Bad 哎呦，不錯哦	13-02	Stolen Love 竊愛	Alang Huang	European Tango		Romance
2014	Aiyo, Not Bad 哎呦，不錯哦	13-03	What Kind of Man 算什麼男人	Jay Chou		Piano	Romance
2014	Aiyo, Not Bad 哎呦，不錯哦	13-04	Passer-by 天涯過客	Vincent Fang	"Zhong guo feng"		Romance
2014	Aiyo, Not Bad 哎呦，不錯哦	13-05	What's Wrong 怎麼了	Vincent Fang			Romance
2014	Aiyo, Not Bad 哎呦，不錯哦	13-06	One Breath 一口氣全唸對	Vincent Fang	Hip-hop		Humor
2014	Aiyo, Not Bad 哎呦，不錯哦	13-07	I Want Summer 我要夏天	Jay Chou			Summer
2014	Aiyo, Not Bad 哎呦，不錯哦	13-08	Handwritten Past 手寫的從前	Vincent Fang		Piano, guitar	Romance
2014	Aiyo, Not Bad 哎呦，不錯哦	13-09	Extra Large Shoes 鞋子特大號	Vincent Fang	R&B		Humor, Charlie Chaplin
2014	Aiyo, Not Bad 哎呦，不錯哦	13-10	Listen to Dad 聽爸爸的話	Jay Chou	Ballad	Piano, electric guitar, strings	Romance, family, father
2014	Aiyo, Not Bad 哎呦，不錯哦	13-11	Mermaid 美人魚	Josh Lo; Jessie Huang	R&B		Romance, mermaid
2014	Aiyo, Not Bad 哎呦，不錯哦	13-12	Rhythm of the Rain 聽見下雨的聲音	Vincent Fang			Romance
2016	Jay Chou's Bedtime Stories 周杰倫的床邊故事	14-01	Bedtime Stories 床邊故事	Vincent Fang	R&B, hip-hop	Synthesizer	Humor
2016	Jay Chou's Bedtime Stories 周杰倫的床邊故事	14-02	Let's Go 說走就走	Vincent Fang	Cowboy folk music, rock		Humor, travelling
2016	Jay Chou's Bedtime Stories 周杰倫的床邊故事	14-03	A Little Bit 一點點	Vincent Fang	Ballad		Romance
2016	Jay Chou's Bedtime Stories 周杰倫的床邊故事	14-04	Lover From a Previous Life 前世情人	Alang Huang 黃俊郎	R&B		Fatherly love
2016	Jay Chou's Bedtime Stories 周杰倫的床邊故事	14-05	Hero 英雄	Jay Chou	Rock		Fantasy, competition
2016	Jay Chou's Bedtime Stories 周杰倫的床邊故事	14-06	Shouldn't Be 不該	Vincent Fang	R&B		Romance
2016	Jay Chou's Bedtime Stories 周杰倫的床邊故事	14-07	Turkish Ice Cream 土耳其冰淇淋	Jay Chou	Hip-hop		Humor, Ice Cream
2016	Jay Chou's Bedtime Stories 周杰倫的床邊故事	14-08	Love Confession 告白氣球	Vincent Fang			Romance
2016	Jay Chou's Bedtime Stories 周杰倫的床邊故事	14-09	Now You See Me	Vincent Fang			Humor, fantasy
2016	Jay Chou's Bedtime Stories 周杰倫的床邊故事	14-10	Failure at Love 愛情廢柴	Jay Chou	Ballad		Romance
2022	Greatest Works of Art 最偉大的作品	15-01	Intro	N/A		Piano	
2022	Greatest Works of Art 最偉大的作品	15-02	Greatest Works of Art 最偉大的作品	Alang Huang 黃俊郎	R&B, hip-hop	Violin, harp, piano	Art, history
2022	Greatest Works of Art 最偉大的作品	15-03	Still Wandering 還在流浪	Vincent Fang	R&B		Romance
2019	Greatest Works of Art 最偉大的作品	15-04	Won't Cry 說好不哭	Vincent Fang	Ballad	Piano, strings	Romance
2022	Greatest Works of Art 最偉大的作品	15-05	Cold Hearted 紅顏如霜	Vincent Fang	Chinese Wind		
2018	Greatest Works of Art 最偉大的作品	15-06	If You Don't Love Me, It's Fine 不愛我就拉倒	Jay Chou; Devon Song	Rock		Romance
2020	Greatest Works of Art 最偉大的作品	15-07	Mojito	Alang Huang 黃俊郎	Latin jazz		Mojito
2022	Greatest Works of Art 最偉大的作品	15-08	You Are the Firework That I Missed 錯過的煙火	Vincent Fang			Romance
2018	Greatest Works of Art 最偉大的作品	15-09	Waiting for You 等你下課	Jay Chou			Romance
2022	Greatest Works of Art 最偉大的作品	15-10	Pink Ocean 粉色海洋	Vincent Fang			
2022	Greatest Works of Art 最偉大的作品	15-11	Reflection 倒影	Vincent Fang			
2019	Greatest Works of Art 最偉大的作品	15-12	I Truly Believe 我是如此相信	Vincent Fang			
2026	Children of the Sun 太陽之子	16-01	Children of the Sun 太陽之子	Vincent Fang	Rock		
2026	Children of the Sun 太陽之子	16-02	Sicily 西西里	Vincent Fang	Pop		
2026	Children of the Sun 太陽之子	16-03	The Day It Rained 那天下雨了	Jay Chou	R&B		
2026	Children of the Sun 太陽之子	16-04	The Girl from Hunan 湘女多情	Vincent Fang	"Zhong guo feng"		
2026	Children of the Sun 太陽之子	16-05	Who Cares 誰稀罕	Jay Chou	Pop		
2026	Children of the Sun 太陽之子	16-06	Aurora in July 七月的極光	Vincent Fang	Electronic		
2026	Children of the Sun 太陽之子	16-07	Aegean Sea 愛琴海	Will Liu	Pop		
2026	Children of the Sun 太陽之子	16-08	I Do	Vincent Fang	R&B		
2026	Children of the Sun 太陽之子	16-09	Saint 聖徒	Huang Yu Xun	Hip-Hop		
2026	Children of the Sun 太陽之子	16-10	My Daughter, Your Highness 女兒殿下	Jay Chou	Pop		
2026	Children of the Sun 太陽之子	16-11	Gold Rush Town 淘金小鎮	Vincent Fang	Rock		
2026	Children of the Sun 太陽之子	16-12	Country Road 鄉間的路	Vincent Fang	Soft Rock		
2023	Children of the Sun 太陽之子	16-13	Christmas Star 聖誕星	Jay Chou	Orchestra Music		

== Notes ==
=== List omissions ===
The following releases by Chou are omitted from this list:

- Singles
  - 千山萬水 (2008-04-30)
  - 阿爸 (2010-10-22)
  - 天地一鬥 ft. Kobe Bryant (2011-02-23)
  - 稻香搖滾版 (2024-07-02)
- EPs
  - Fantasy Plus 范特西Plus (2001-12-24)
  - Hidden Track 尋找周杰倫 (2003-11-11)
  - Fearless 霍元甲 (2006-01-20)
  - Curse of the Golden Flower 黃金甲 (2006-12-7)
- Live albums
  - The One Concert Live 2002The One演唱會 (2002-10-21)
  - Incomparable Concert Live 2004無與倫比演唱會 (2004-12-03)
  - 2007 World Tour Concert Live 2007世界巡迴演唱會 (2008-01-31)
  - The Era Concert Live 2010超時代演唱會 (2011-01-25)
  - Opus Jay Concert Live 2013魔天倫演唱會 (2016-05-10)
  - The Invincible Concert Live 地表最強巡迴演唱會 (2019-11-11)
- Soundtrack albums
  - Secret 不能說的秘密 (2007-08-13)
  - The Rooftop 天台 (2013-07-12)
- Compilation albums
  - Partners (2002-04-26)
  - Initial J: Jay Chou's Greatest Hits (2005-08-31)
- Appears on
  - 屋頂 with Landy Wen (on the 2001-07-05 album 有點野)
  - 畫沙 with Cindy Yen (on the 2009 album 袁詠琳同名專輯)
  - 你是我的OK繃 with The Drifters (on the 2010 album 浪花兄弟同名專輯)
  - Try with Patrick Brasca (2016-01-08)
  - Six Degrees with Patrick Brasca (2025-01-09)

=== Music genre/style definitions ===
Chou's combines a number of popular and culturally-distinct music styles. The following criteria are used to categorize music styles mentioned in the above list:

Common styles used in Chou's music:

R&B
Contemporary R&B is a genre of pop music, characterized by smooth vocal arrangements and a smooth beat. This is very different from traditional "Rhythm and Blues" which is not usually used in Chou's compositions.
"Zhong guo feng"
Chou has popularized a style of music called "Zhong guo feng", which means "Chinese Style" (中國風). ("Feng" on its own means "wind," but in context it is a shortening of the phrase "feng ge" (風格), meaning characteristic style or genre.) Zhong guo feng features traditional Chinese instruments and Western instruments, sometimes written in the Pentatonic Scale. Lyrics may be in the form of Chinese poetry and discuss themes related with Chinese history and folklore.
Hip hop
Rap and beat-heavy; may involve use of scratch, sound sampling, synthesizer music.
Pop
Although "pop music" can be used to describe any music that is popular, pop music refers to songs with a simple melody and beat, having a repetitive structure, and is easy to sing along.
Rock
Music with heavy use of guitar, drums, bass; strong beat.
Soft rock
A genre of rock music, using similar instruments and others such as the piano. Lyrics are usually "less confrontational" than rock music.
Electronic
A general term for music where the instrumental track is largely synthesizer-based.
Classical music
Western classical music styles of the Baroque, Classical, and Romantic era (1600-1910).
Orchestra music
A genre of classical music. Instruments include woodwinds, brass, percussion, and strings.

Less common styles used in Chou's music:

Hip hop soul
A genre of R&B and soul singing styles, mixed with hip hop beats. Lyrics tend to be darker in theme.
Spanish
Involves distinct Spanish musical styles such as Flamenco music and the use of instruments such as the Flamenco guitar.
Tango
See Tango and Argentine music
Bossanova
A type of music which originated from Brazil.
