= Jay Chou singles discography =

Jay Chou discography
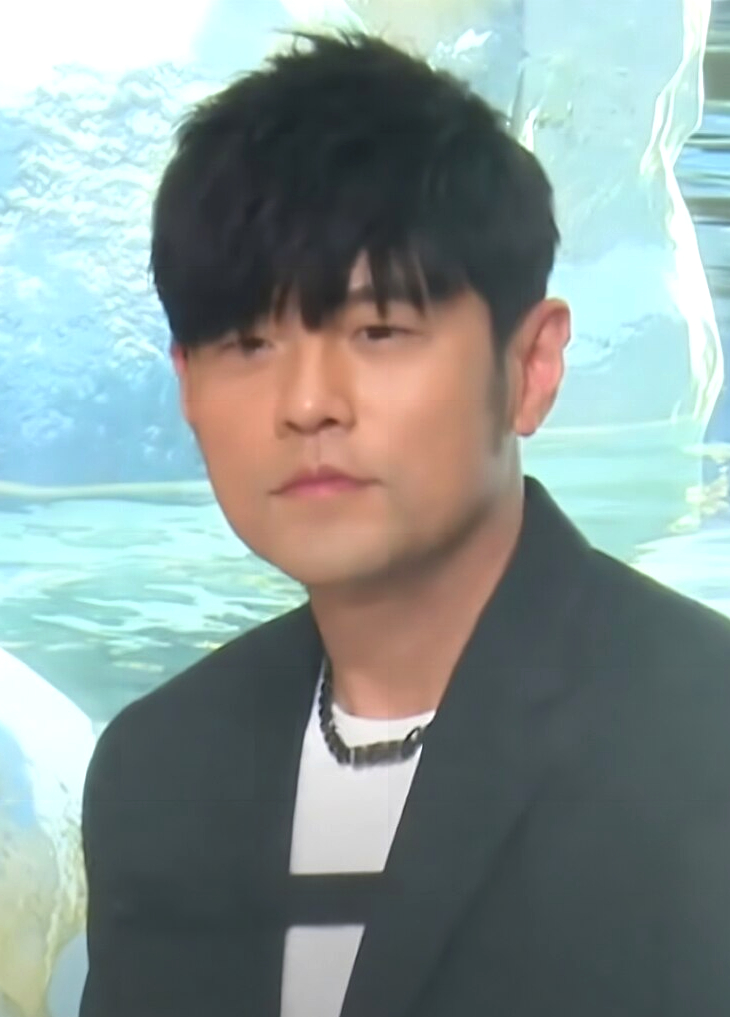
- Chou in 2023
- Singles: 53
- Promotional singles: 5
- Soundtracks: 2

Taiwanese singer-songwriter Jay Chou has released fifteen studio albums since his debut in 2000. His sophomore studio album, Fantasy (2001), spawned singles such as "Simple Love" and "Silence", while his next album, The Eight Dimensions (2002), was supported with singles such as "Secret Signal" and "Back to the Past". His fourth studio record, Yeh Hui-Mei (2003), produced singles such as "Sunny Day" and "Dong-Feng-Po", the former of which re-charted within the top 20 on the charts in Taiwan, Malaysia and Singapore 15 years after its release.

Common Jasmine Orange (2004) produced the title track of the same name, which was named the most popular song of the year in Taiwan by Hit FM. The album also spawned the single as "Step Aside". Various singles were promoted for November's Chopin (2005), including "Coral Sea", "All the Way North", and "Maple Leaf". "Blue and White Porcelain" (2007) drew inspiration from porcelain—a national treasure in China—as the song's central motif, which won Song of the Year at the Golden Melody Awards. His 2008 single, "Rice Field", also won the same award the following year's ceremony.

Aiyo, Not Bad (2014) contained several singles including "What Kind of Man" and "Rhythm of the Rain". Jay Chou's Bedtime Stories (2016) spawned several hits including the collaboration "Shouldn't Be" with A-Mei and the song "Love Confession". "Won't Cry" (2019) and "Mojito" (2020) reached number one on the charts in China and garnered over 9 million downloads in the country. The single "Greatest Works of Art" from the album of the same name (2022) reached number one in Taiwan, China, Hong Kong, and Malaysia.

== Singles ==
=== 2000s ===
List of singles released in the 2000s, with associated albums
| Title | Year | Peak chart positions | | | Album |
| Title | Year | TWN (Note: Billboard's Hits of the World charts (including Hong Kong Songs and Taiwan Songs) were launched in February 2022.) | MLY Chin. | SGP Reg. | Album |
|---|---|---|---|---|---|
| "Adorable Lady" (可愛女人) | 2000 | — | — | — | Jay |
| "Tornado" (龍捲風) | 2000 | — | — | — | Jay |
| "Starry Mood" (星晴) | 2000 | — | — | — | Jay |
| "Simple Love" (簡單愛) | 2001 | — | — | — | Fantasy |
| "Can't Express Myself" (開不了口) | 2001 | — | — | — | Fantasy |
| "Silence" (安靜) | 2001 | — | — | — | Fantasy |
| "Back to the Past" (回到過去) | 2002 | — | — | — | The Eight Dimensions |
| "Peninsula Ironbox" (半島鐵盒) | 2002 | — | — | — | The Eight Dimensions |
| "Dong-Feng-Po" (東風破) | 2003 | — | — | — | Yeh Hui-Mei |
| "Sunny Day" (晴天) | 2003 | 9 | 2 | 16 | Yeh Hui-Mei |
| "In the Name of the Father" (以父之名) | 2003 | — | — | — | Yeh Hui-Mei |
| "Common Jasmine Orange" (七里香) | 2004 | 12 | 4 | — | Common Jasmine Orange |
| "Step Aside" (擱淺) | 2004 | 5 | 3 | 20 | Common Jasmine Orange |
| "Excuse" (藉口) | 2004 | — | — | — | Common Jasmine Orange |
| "Nocturne" (夜曲) | 2005 | 14 | — | — | November's Chopin |
| "Coral Sea" (珊瑚海) (with Lara Liang) | 2005 | 23 | — | — | November's Chopin |
| "All the Way North" (一路向北) | 2005 | 16 | 7 | — | November's Chopin |
| "Hair Like Snow" (髮如雪) | 2005 | — | — | — | November's Chopin |
| "Maple Leaf" (楓) | 2005 | 10 | 6 | — | November's Chopin |
| "Far Away" (千里之外) (featuring Fei Yu-ching) | 2006 | — | — | — | Still Fantasy |
| "A Step Back" (退後) | 2006 | 13 | — | — | Still Fantasy |
| "Listen to Mom" (聽媽媽的話) | 2006 | — | — | — | Still Fantasy |
| "Secret" (不能說的秘密) | 2007 | — | — | — | Secret OST |
| "Cowboy on the Run" (牛仔很忙) | 2007 | — | — | — | On the Run! |
| "Blue and White Porcelain" (青花瓷) | 2007 | — | — | — | On the Run! |
| "Rice Field" (稻香) | 2008 | — | — | — | Capricorn |
| "The Promised Love" (說好的幸福呢) | 2008 | — | 10 | — | Capricorn |
| "Give Me the Time of a Song" (給我一首歌的時間) | 2008 | — | — | — | Capricorn |
| "Sand Painting" (畫沙) (with Cindy Yen) | 2009 | — | — | — | Cindy Yen |
"—" denotes releases that did not chart, chart did not exist, or was not released in that region.

=== 2010s ===
List of singles released in the 2010s, with chart positions and associated albums
| Title | Year | Peak chart positions | | | | | | | Sales | Certifications | Album |
| Title | Year | TWN | CHN | MLY (Note: Starting the week ending 24 March 2022, the Recording Industry Association of Malaysia's Top 20 International and Domestic Singles chart was reconfigured to be exclusively for international single releases. The same week, the Top 10 Chinese Singles chart was introduced.) | MLY Chin. | NZ Hot | SGP | US World | Sales | Certifications | Album |
|---|---|---|---|---|---|---|---|---|---|---|---|
| "Superman Can't Fly" (超人不會飛) | 2010 | — | — | — | — | — | — | — | | | The Era |
| "Fade Away" (煙花易冷) | 2010 | — | — | — | — | — | — | — | | | The Era |
| "Mine Mine" | 2011 | — | — | — | — | — | — | — | | | Wow! |
| "Exclamation Point" (驚嘆號) | 2011 | — | — | — | — | — | — | — | | | Wow! |
| "Ming Ming Jiu" (明明就) | 2012 | — | — | — | — | — | — | — | | | Opus 12 |
| "Hong-Chen Inn" (紅塵客棧) | 2012 | — | — | — | — | — | — | — | | | Opus 12 |
| "You Are Everywhere" (哪裡都是你) | 2013 | — | — | — | — | — | — | — | | | The Rooftop OST |
| "What Kind of Man" (算什麼男人) | 2014 | — | — | — | — | — | — | — | | | Aiyo, Not Bad |
| "Handwritten Past" (手寫的從前) | 2014 | — | — | — | — | — | — | — | | | Aiyo, Not Bad |
| "Rhythm of the Rain" (聽見下雨的聲音) | 2015 | — | — | — | — | — | — | — | | | Aiyo, Not Bad |
| "Shouldn't Be" (不該) (with A-Mei) | 2016 | — | 2 | — | — | — | — | — | | | Jay Chou's Bedtime Stories |
| "Failure at Love" (愛情廢柴) | 2016 | — | — | — | — | — | — | — | | | Jay Chou's Bedtime Stories |
| "Love Confession" (告白氣球) | 2016 | — | 1 | — | 5 | — | — | — | | | Jay Chou's Bedtime Stories |
| "Waiting for You" (等你下課) (with Gary Yang) | 2018 | 22 | 1 | 5 | 9 | — | 4 | — | | RIAS: Gold | Greatest Works of Art |
| "If You Don't Love Me, It's Fine" (不愛我就拉倒) | 2018 | 17 | 1 | — | 8 | — | 2 | — | | | Greatest Works of Art |
| "Won't Cry" (說好不哭) (with Ashin) | 2019 | 6 | 1 | 1 | 4 | 25 | 1 | 5 | CHN: 10,922,798 | | Greatest Works of Art |
| "I Truly Believe" (我是如此相信) | 2019 | 18 | 1 | — | 10 | — | 15 | — | | | Greatest Works of Art |
"—" denotes releases that did not chart, chart did not exist, or was not released in that region.

=== 2020s ===
List of singles released in the 2020s, with chart positions and associated albums
| Title | Year | Peak chart positions | | | | | | | | Sales | Album |
| Title | Year | TWN | CHN | HK | MLY | MLY Chin. | NZ Hot | SGP | US World | Sales | Album |
|---|---|---|---|---|---|---|---|---|---|---|---|
| "Mojito" | 2020 | 20 | 1 | — | — | — | 24 | 2 | 7 | CHN: 9,214,674 | Greatest Works of Art |
| "Greatest Works of Art" (最偉大的作品) | 2022 | 1 | 1 | 1 | — | 1 | 35 | 7 | — | | Greatest Works of Art |
| "Still Wandering" (還在流浪) | 2022 | 1 | 2 | 5 | 5 | 1 | — | 6 | — | | Greatest Works of Art |
| "Christmas Star" (聖誕星) (with Gary Yang) | 2023 | 2 | 1 | 21 | — | 1 | 18 | — | — | | Non-album singles |
| "Six Degrees" (with Patrick Brasca) | 2025 | 6 | 3 | — | — | — | — | — | — | | Non-album singles |
"—" denotes releases that did not chart, chart did not exist, or was not released in that region.

== Promotional songs ==
| Title | Year | Notes |
|---|---|---|
| "Wo Men Zai Chengzhang" (我們在成長) | 2002 | Promotional song for RTHK Solar Project |
| "Over Mountains and Oceans" (千山萬水) | 2008 | Song for the 2008 Summer Olympics |
| "Spark" (天地一鬥) | 2011 | Promotional song for Sprite |
| "Hero" (英雄) | 2016 | Promotional song for League of Legends |

== Other charted songs ==
| Title | Year | Peak chart positions | | | | | Album |
| Title | Year | TWN | CHN | HK | MLY | SGP | Album |
|---|---|---|---|---|---|---|---|
| "Orbit" (軌跡) | 2003 | 15 | — | — | — | — | Hidden Track |
| "Cold Hearted" (紅顏如霜) | 2022 | 4 | 3 | 22 | 23 | 17 | Greatest Works of Art |
| "You Are the Firework I Missed" (錯過的煙火) | 2022 | 6 | 9 | — | — | — | Greatest Works of Art |
| "Reflection" (倒影) | 2022 | 12 | 10 | — | — | — | Greatest Works of Art |
| "Pink Ocean" (粉色海洋) | 2022 | 14 | 7 | — | — | — | Greatest Works of Art |
"—" denotes releases that did not chart.

== As featured artist ==
| Title | Year | Album |
|---|---|---|
| "You're My Bandaid" (你是我的OK繃) (The Drifters featuring Jay Chou) | 2010 | The Drifters |

== Songwriting credits ==
- 1999 – "蝸牛" (Snail) by Valen Hsu, Chyi Chin, Panda Hsiung, and Power Station
- 1999 – "姐你睡了嗎" (Have you fallen asleep, sis?) by Vivian Hsu
- 2001 – "你怎麼連話都說不清楚" (Can't Speak Clearly) from Lucky Number by Jolin Tsai
- 2001 – "Dao Ma Dan" by Coco Lee
- 2002 – "熱帶雨林" (Tropical Rainforest) from Youth Society by S.H.E
- 2003 – "騎士精神" (Spirit of the Knight) from Magic by Jolin Tsai
- 2003 – "說愛你" (Say Love You) from Magic by Jolin Tsai
- 2003 – "布拉格廣場" (Prague Square) from Magic by Jolin Tsai
- 2004 – "就是愛" (It's Love) from Castle by Jolin Tsai
- 2004 – "倒帶" (Rewind) from Castle by Jolin Tsai
- 2004 – "海盜" (Pirates) from Castle by Jolin Tsai
- 2004 – "候鳥" (Migratory Bird) from Encore by S.H.E
- 2005 – "自我催眠" (Self-Hypnosis) from Hypnosis Show by Show Lo
- 2006 – "失憶" (Amnesia) from Kissing the Future of Love by Fish Leong
- 2006 – "觸電" (Electric Shock) from Forever by S.H.E
- 2007 – "淘汰" (Elimination) from Admit it by Eason Chan
- 2007 – "我不是F4" (I'm Not F4) from I'm Not F4 by Vic Chou
- 2007 – "小小" (Little Little) from Little Little by Joey Yung
- 2010 – "想你就寫信" (If I Think of You I'll Write You a Letter) from The Drifters by The Drifters
- 2011 – "月光" (Moonlight) by Gary Yang
- 2011 – "幸福微甜" (Love Is Sweet) from Perfection by Super Junior–M
- 2012 – "都要微笑好嗎" (Keep Smiling) from First Time OST by Angelababy
- 2015 – "剩下的盛夏" (The Rest of Our Summer) by TFBOYS
- 2018 – "謝謝一輩子" (Thank you for a lifetime) by Jackie Chan
- 2018 – "一路上小心" by Jacky Wu
- 2020 – "等風雨經過" (Waiting for the Wind and Rain to Pass) by Jacky Cheung
- 2022 – "Amigo" by Nine One One

== Music videos directed ==
- 2004 – "家" (Home) from Nan Quan Mama's Summer by Nan Quan Mama
- 2005 – "不作你的朋友" (Not Gonna Be Your Friend) from Once Upon a Time by S.H.E
- 2010 – "你是我的OK繃" (You're My Bandaid) from The Drifters by The Drifters
