= List of awards and nominations received by Jay Chou =

This is the list of awards and nominations received by Taiwanese singer Jay Chou.

== Golden Horse Awards ==
The Golden Horse Awards (Chinese: 金馬獎; pinyin: Jīn Mǎ Jiǎng) are presented annually by the Government Information Office of Republic of China (Taiwan). It recognises achievement in filmmaking and is Taiwan's equivalent to Academy Awards and BAFTA.

Year	Category	Nomination	Result	Ref.
2005	Best New Performer	Jay Chou for Initial D	Won	
2005	Best Original Song	"Drifting" by Jay Chou from Initial D	Nominated	
2007	Best Original Score	Terdsak Janpan & Jay Chou for Secret	Nominated	
2007	Best Original Song	"Secret" from Secret	Won	
2007	Taiwanese Outstanding Filmmaker	Jay Chou	Nominated	
2008	Best Original Song	"Master Chou" from Kung Fu Dunk	Nominated	

== Golden Melody Awards ==
The Golden Melody Awards (Chinese: 金曲獎; pinyin: Jīn Qǔ Jiǎng) are presented annually by the Government Information Office of Republic of China (Taiwan). It recognises achievement in music production and is Taiwan's equivalent to the Grammy Awards. Since his debut in 2000, he has received 15 awards from 49 nominations.

Year	Category	Nomination	Result	Ref.
2001	Best Mandarin Album	Jay	Won	
2001	Best Composer	Jay Chou for "Adorable Lady"	Nominated	
2001	Best Album Producer	Jay Chou	Nominated	
2001	Best New Artist	Jay Chou	Nominated	
2002	Best Mandarin Album	Fantasy	Won	
2002	Best Composer	Jay Chou for "Love Before BC"	Won	
2002	Best Album Producer	Jay Chou	Won	
2002	Best Mandarin Male Singer	Jay Chou	Nominated	
2003	Best Mandarin Album	The Eight Dimensions	Nominated	
2003	Best Album Producer	Jay Chou	Nominated	
2004	Best Mandarin Album	Yeh Hui-mei	Won	
2004	Best Composer	Jay Chou for "East Wind Breaks"	Nominated	
2004	Best Lyricist	Jay Chou for "Terraced Field"	Nominated	
2004	Best Album Producer	Jay Chou	Nominated	
2004	Best Mandarin Male Singer	Jay Chou	Nominated	
2005	Best Mandarin Album	Common Jasmin Orange	Nominated	
2005	Best Composer	Jay Chou for "Common Jamsine Orange"	Nominated	
2005	Best Mandarin Male Singer	Jay Chou	Nominated	
2007	Song of the Year	"Far Away" feat. Fei Yu-ching	Nominated	
2007	Best Music Video Director	Jay Chou for "Moulin Rouge"	Nominated	
2007	Best Single Producer	Jay Chou for "Fearless"	Won	
2008	Song of the Year	"Blue and White Porcelain"	Won	
2008	Best Mandarin Album	On the Run!	Nominated	
2008	Best Composer	Jay Chou for "Blue and White Porcelain"	Won	
2008	Best Instrumental Album	Secret	Nominated	
2008	Best Instrumental Composer	Jay Chou & Terdsak Janpan for "Piano Room"	Won	
2008	Best Instrumental Album Producer	Jay Chou for Secret	Won	
2009	Song of the Year	"Rice Field"	Won	
2009	Best Mandarin Album	Capricorn	Nominated	
2009	Best Music Video	Jay Chou for "Magician"	Won	
2009	Best Composer	Jay Chou for "Rice Field"	Nominated	
2009	Best Lyricist	Jay Chou for "Rice Field"	Nominated	
2009	Best Album Producer	Jay Chou	Nominated	
2009	Best Mandarin Male singer	Jay Chou	Won	
2011	Song of the Year	"Superman Can't Fly"	Nominated	
2011	Best Mandarin Album	The Era	Won	
2011	Best Composer	Jay Chou for "Fireworks Cool Easily"	Nominated	
2011	Best Album Producer	Jay Chou	Nominated	
2011	Best Mandarin Male Singer	Jay Chou	Won	
2012	Best Music Arranger	Jay Chou for "Sailor Afraid of Water"	Nominated	
2012	Best Mandarin Male Singer	Jay Chou	Nominated	
2013	Best Mandarin Album	Opus 12	Nominated	
2013	Best Album Producer	Jay Chou for Opus 12	Nominated	
2013	Best Mandarin Male Singer	Jay Chou	Nominated	
2015	Best Mandarin Album	Aiyo, Not Bad	Nominated	
2015	Best Album Producer	Jay Chou for Aiyo, Not Bad	Nominated	
2017	Song of the Year	"Love Confession"	Nominated	
2017	Best Music Video	"Bedtime Stories"	Nominated	
2017	Best Mandarin Male Singer	Jay Chou	Nominated	

== Hong Kong Film Awards ==
The Hong Kong Film Awards (Chinese: 香港電影金像獎), founded in 1982 and presented annually in April, recognizes achievement in filmmaking and is Hong Kong's equivalent to Academy Awards and BAFTA.

Year	Category	Nomination	Result	Ref.
2006	Best New Performer	Jay Chou for Initial D	Won	
2006	Best Original Song	"Drifting" from Initial D	Nominated	
2007	Best Supporting Actor	Curse of the Golden Flower	Nominated	
2007	Best Original Song	"Chrysanthemum Terrace" from Curse of the Golden Flower	Won	
2007	Best Original Song	"Fearless" from Fearless	Nominated	

== MTV Movie & TV Awards ==
The MTV Movie & TV Awards (formerly known as the MTV Movie Awards) is a film and television awards show presented annually on MTV.

Year	Category	Nomination	Result	Ref.
2011	Best Breakthrough Performance	The Green Hornet	Nominated	

== World Music Awards ==
The World Music Awards is an international awards show founded in 1989 that annually honors recording artists based on worldwide sales figures provided by the International Federation of the Phonographic Industry (IFPI).

Year	Category	Nomination	Result
2004	Best Selling Chinese Artist	Common Jasmin Orange	Won
2006	Best Selling Chinese Artist	Still Fantasy	Won
2007	Best Selling Chinese Artist	On the Run!	Won
2008	Best Selling Chinese Artist	Capricorn	Won

== MTV Video Music Awards Japan ==
MTV VMAJ was started in 2002.

Year	Award	Nominated work	Result
2002	Best Asian Artist		Won
2004	Best buzz ASIA - Taiwan	"In Name of Father"	Nominated
2005	Best buzz ASIA - Taiwan	"Hair Like Snow"	Won
2008	Best buzz ASIA - Taiwan	"Cowboy on the Run"	Nominated
