= Opus Jay World Tour =

2013–15 concert tour by Jay Chou

- Tour by Jay Chou
- Location: Asia; Australia
- Associated album: Opus 12
- Start date: May 17, 2013
- End date: December 20, 2015
- No. of shows: 76
- Attendance: 1,800,000
- Box office: $250 million

Jay Chou concert chronology
- The Era World Tour (2010–11); Opus Jay World Tour (2013–15); The Invincible World Tour (2016–18)

The Opus Jay World Tour was the sixth concert tour by Taiwanese recording artist Jay Chou, held in support of his twelfth studio album Opus 12 (2012). The tour visited various countries including China, Taiwan, Malaysia, Indonesia and Australia from May 2013 to December 2015. A live album of the tour was released on May 10, 2016.

The tour attracted a total of 1.8 million people, and grossed NT$7.245 billion (US$250 million) in revenue.

== Commercial performance ==
According to Billboard, the concert in Sydney, Australia on April 11, 2014, grossed $1.4 million in revenue.

== Gallery ==
Opus Jay World Tour in Hong Kong gallery
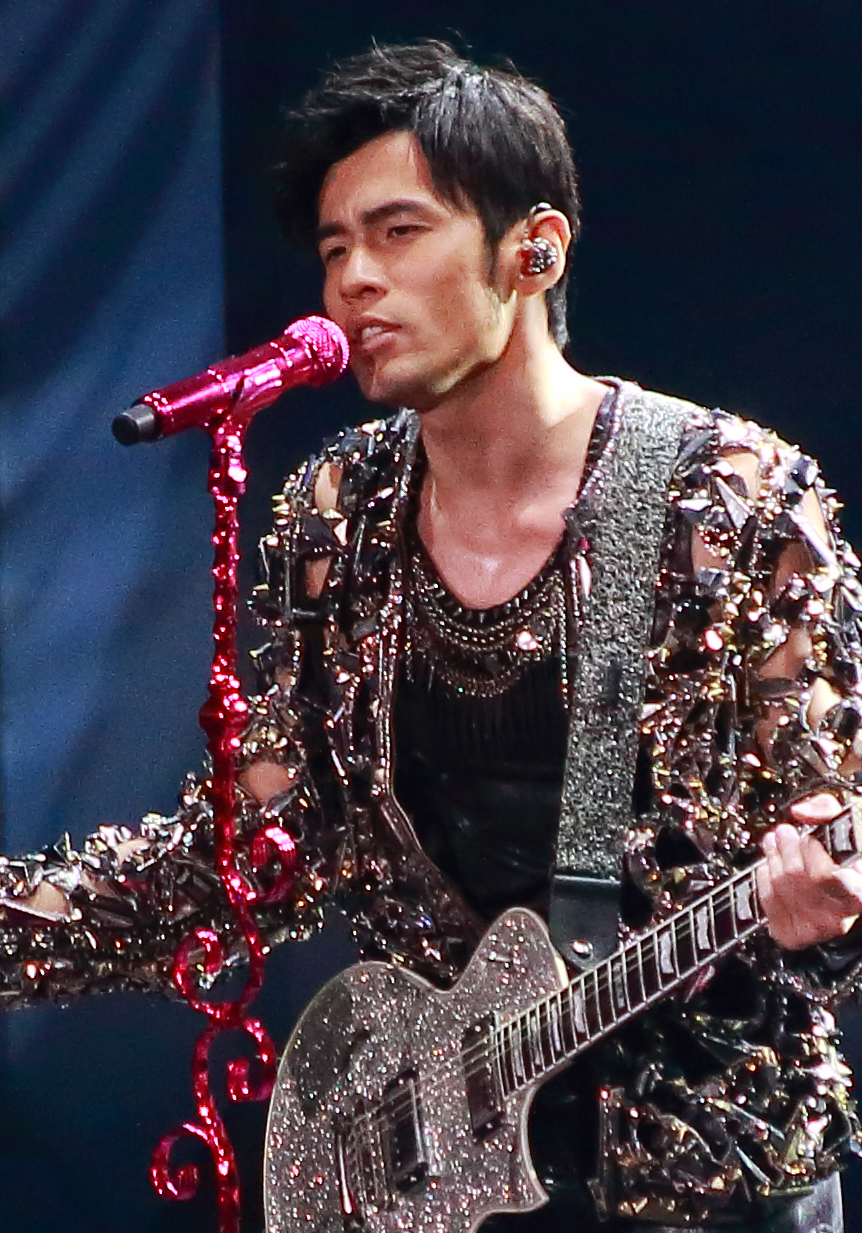

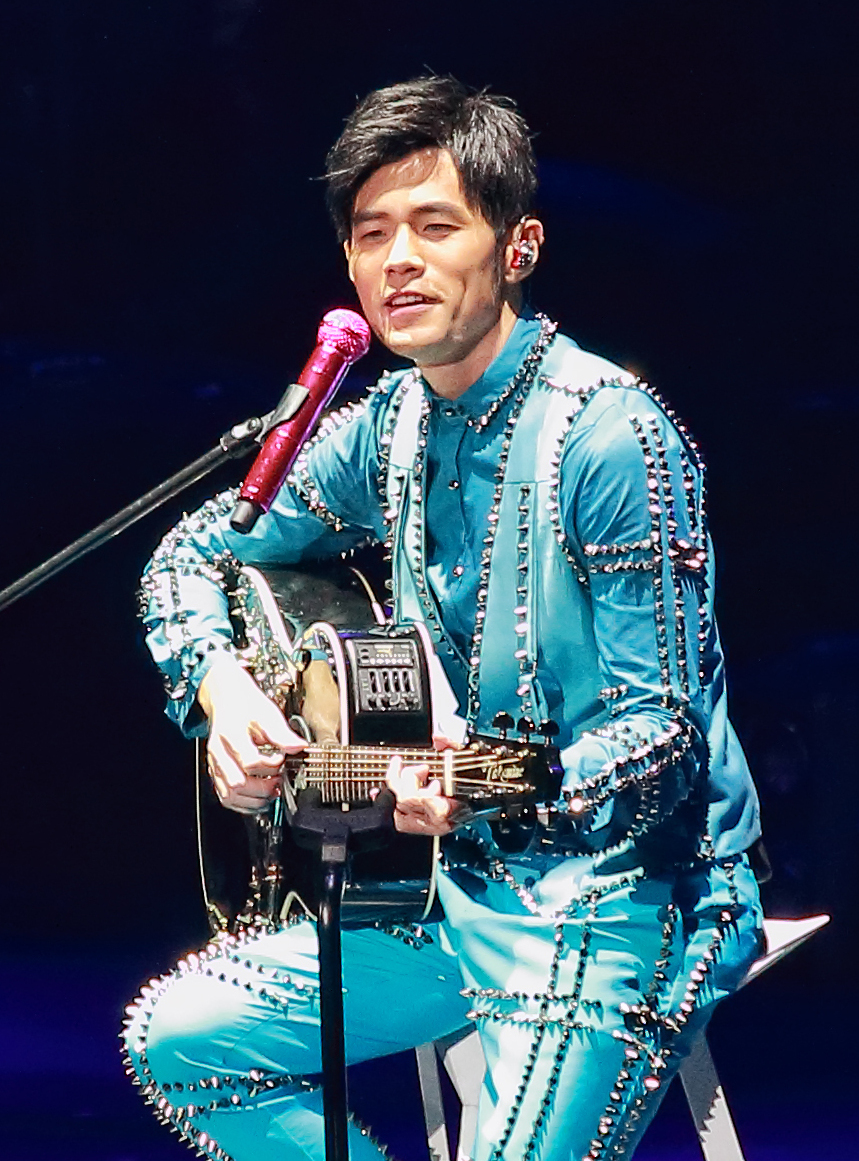

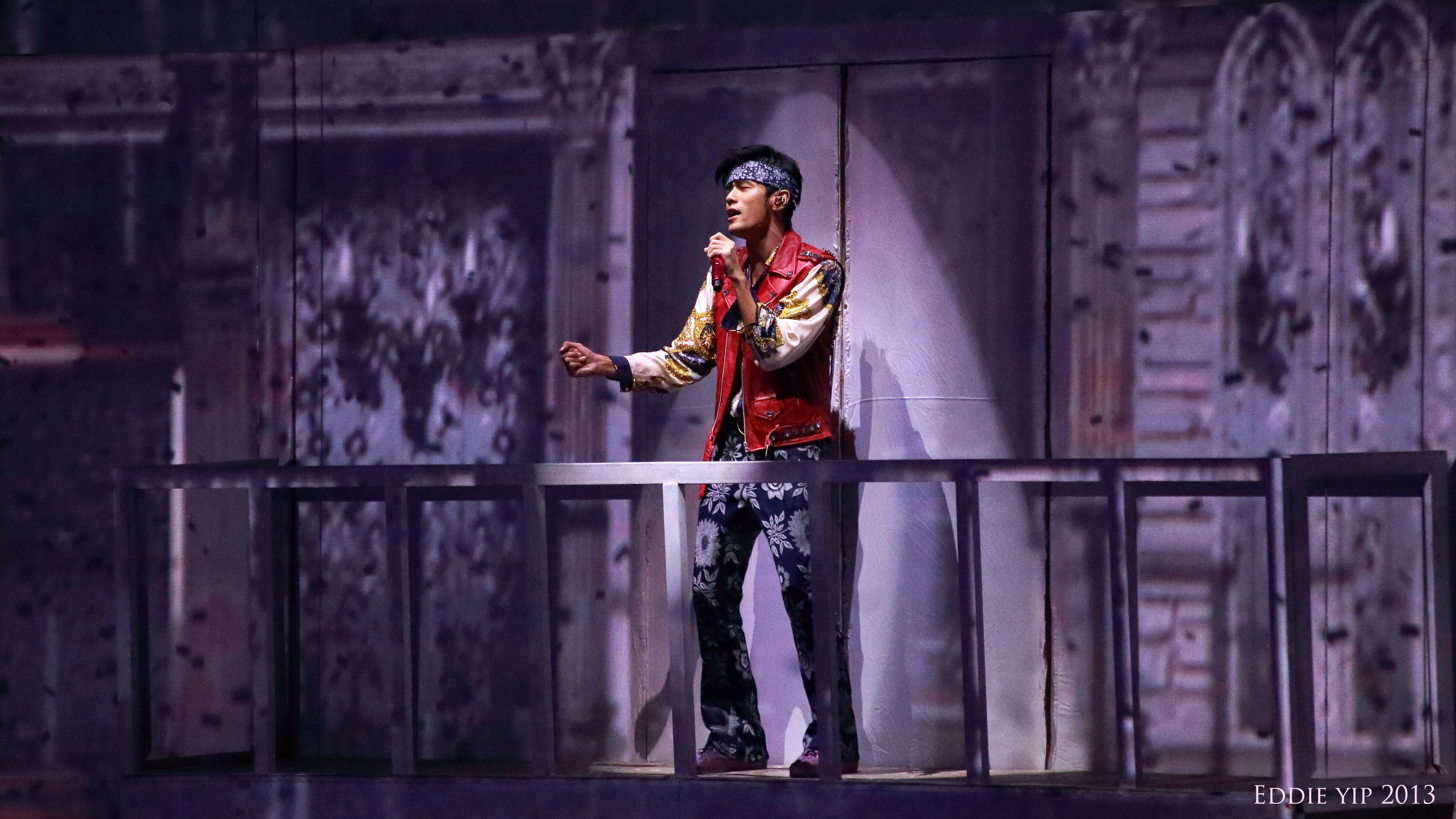

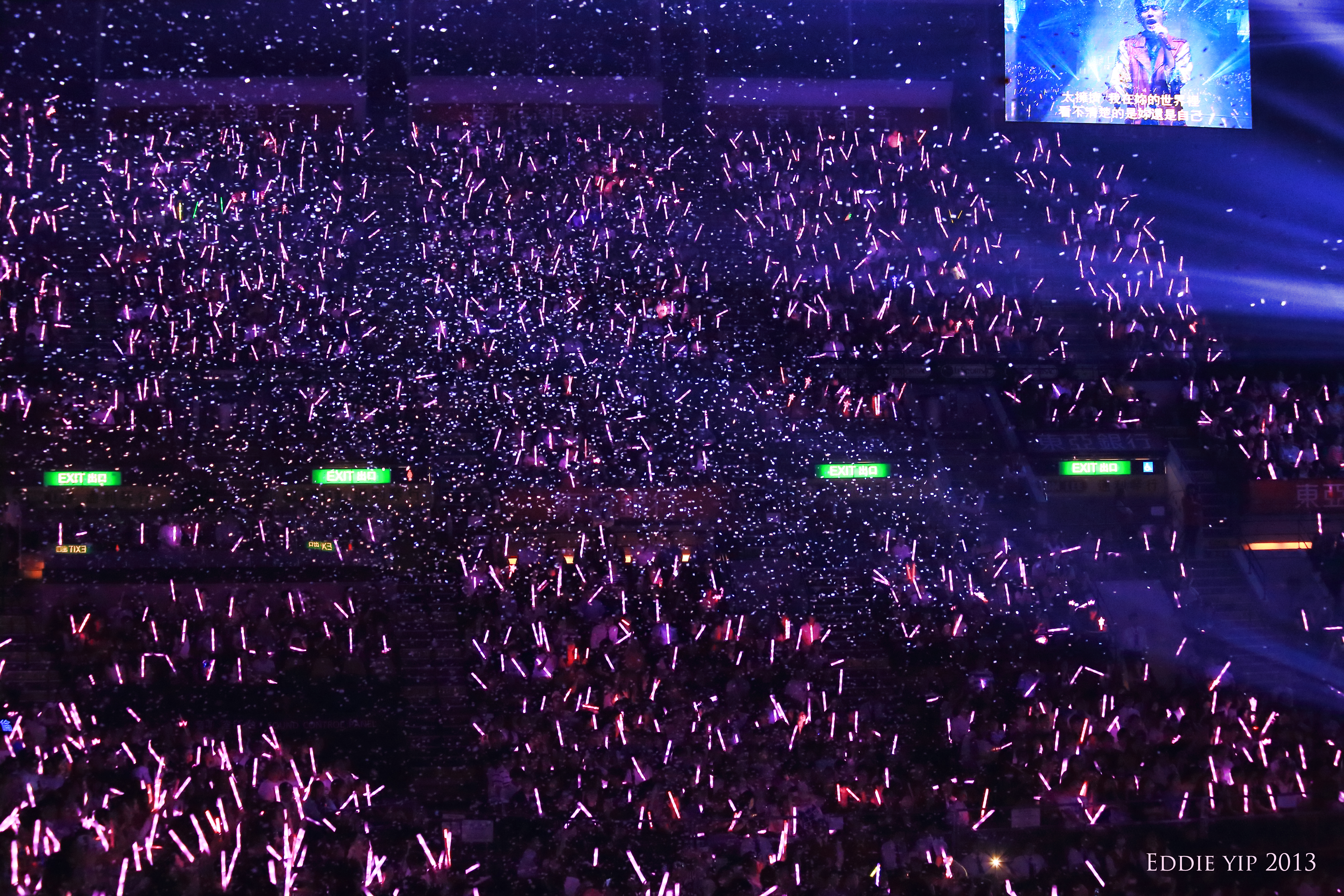

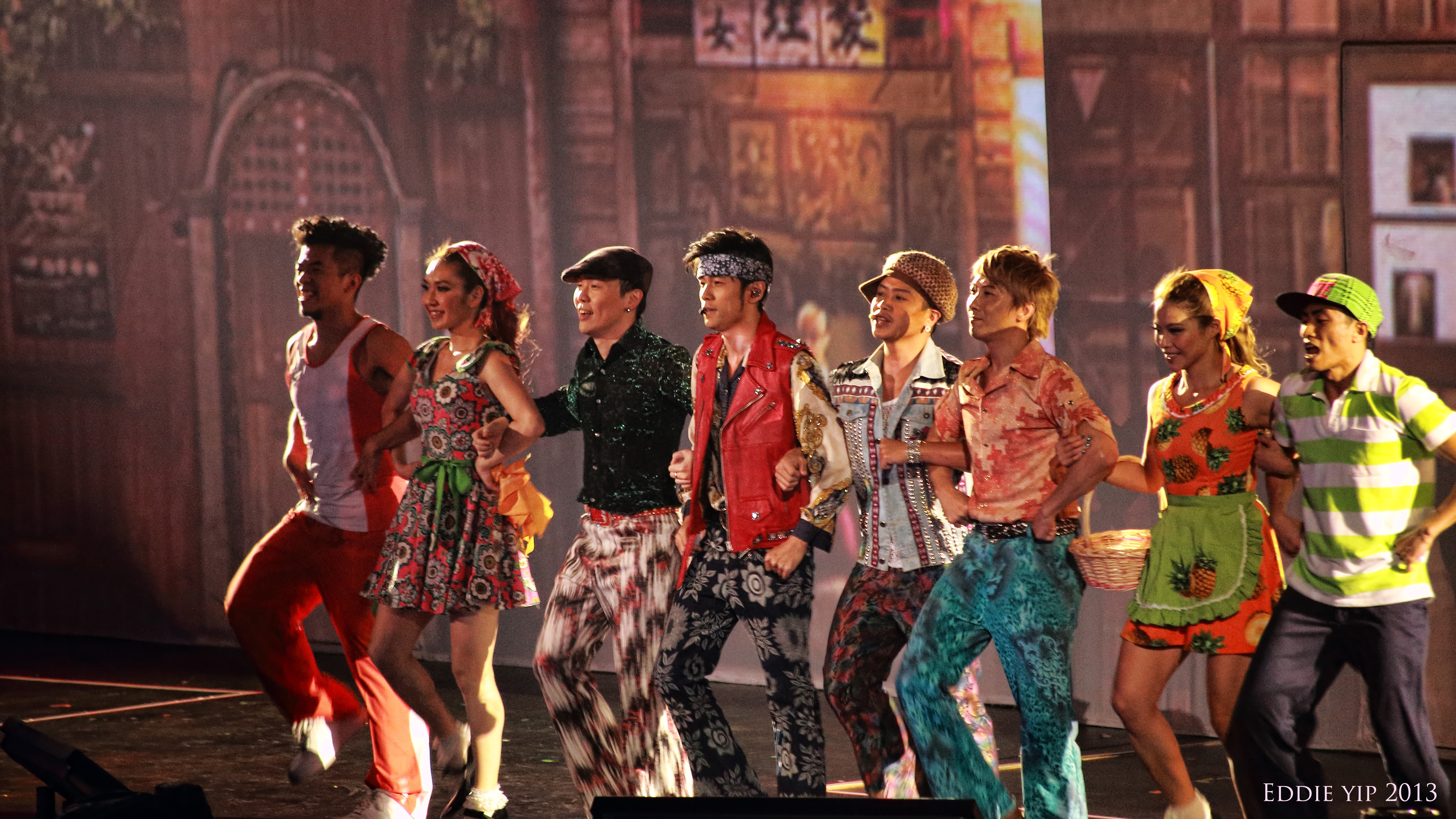

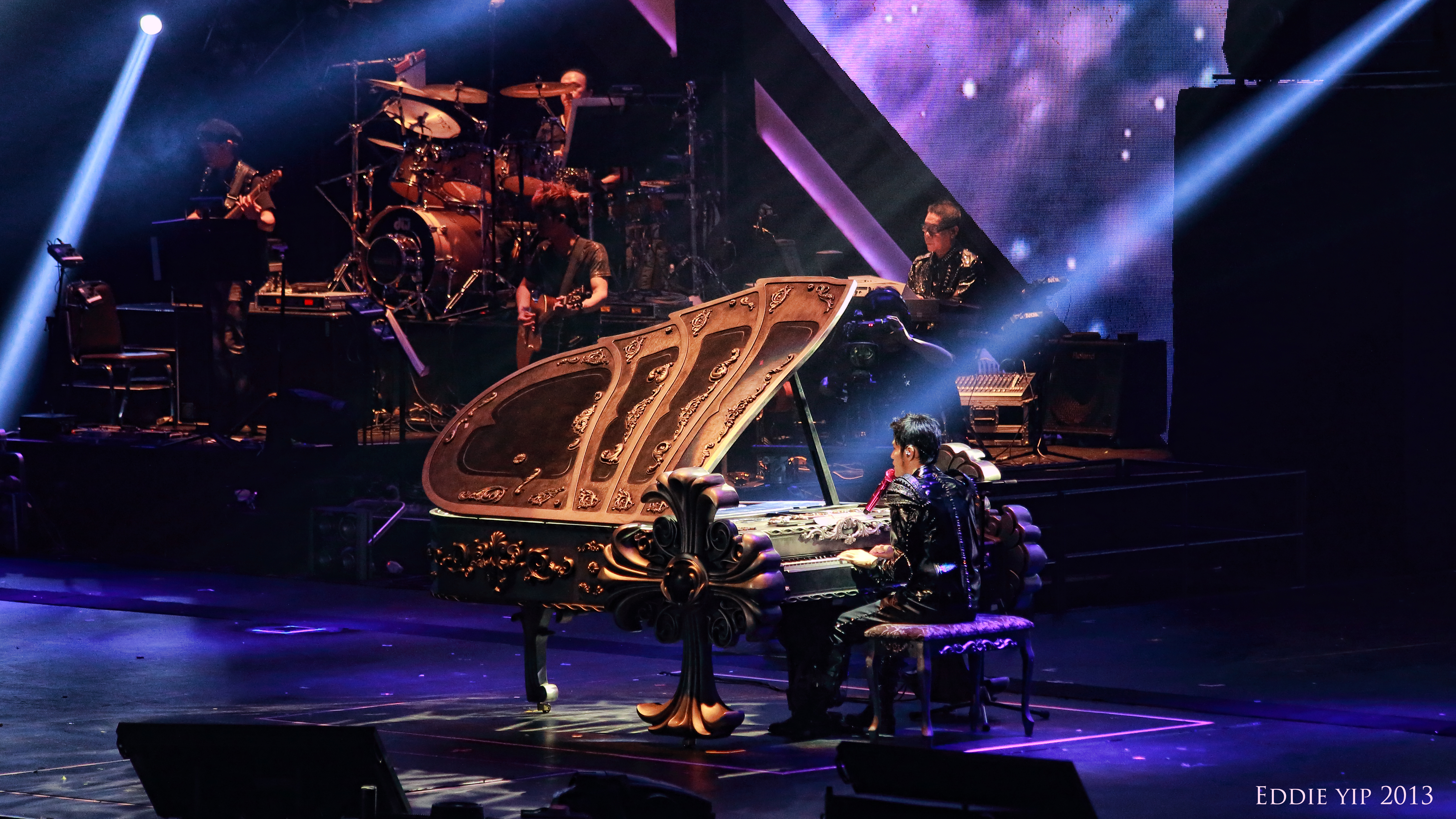

== Tour dates ==
List of concert dates
Date	City	Country	Venue	Attendance
May 17, 2013	Shanghai	China	Mercedes-Benz Arena	—
May 18, 2013	Shanghai	China	Mercedes-Benz Arena	—
May 19, 2013	Shanghai	China	Mercedes-Benz Arena	—
May 24, 2013	Beijing	China	Capital Indoor Stadium	—
May 25, 2013	Beijing	China	Capital Indoor Stadium	—
May 26, 2013	Beijing	China	Capital Indoor Stadium	—
June 6, 2013	Singapore		Singapore Indoor Stadium	—
June 7, 2013	Singapore		Singapore Indoor Stadium	—
June 8, 2013	Singapore		Singapore Indoor Stadium	—
June 22, 2013	Chengdu	China	Chengdu Sports Centre Stadium	—
June 29, 2013	Wuhan	China	Wuhan Sports Center Stadium	—
July 12, 2013	Guangzhou	China	Guangzhou International Sports Arena	—
July 13, 2013	Guangzhou	China	Guangzhou International Sports Arena	—
July 20, 2013	Nanning	China	Guangxi Sports Centre Stadium	—
July 27, 2013	Tianjin	China	Tianjin Olympic Centre Stadium	—
August 2, 2013	Kuala Lumpur	Malaysia	Putra Indoor Stadium	—
August 3, 2013	Kuala Lumpur	Malaysia	Putra Indoor Stadium	—
August 4, 2013	Kuala Lumpur	Malaysia	Putra Indoor Stadium	—
September 6, 2013	Taipei	Taiwan	Taipei Arena	—
September 7, 2013	Taipei	Taiwan	Taipei Arena	—
September 8, 2013	Taipei	Taiwan	Taipei Arena	—
September 13, 2013	Hong Kong		Hong Kong Coliseum	—
September 14, 2013	Hong Kong		Hong Kong Coliseum	—
September 15, 2013	Hong Kong		Hong Kong Coliseum	—
September 16, 2013	Hong Kong		Hong Kong Coliseum	—
September 17, 2013	Hong Kong		Hong Kong Coliseum	—
September 19, 2013	Hong Kong		Hong Kong Coliseum	—
September 20, 2013	Hong Kong		Hong Kong Coliseum	—
September 21, 2013	Hong Kong		Hong Kong Coliseum	—
September 22, 2013	Hong Kong		Hong Kong Coliseum	—
September 30, 2013	Xi'an	China	Shaanxi Province Stadium	—
October 12, 2013	Jakarta	Indonesia	Mata Elang International Stadium	—
October 19, 2013	Fuzhou	China	Fuzhou Stadium	—
November 2, 2013	Chongqing	China	Chongqing Olympic Sports Centre Stadium	—
November 9, 2013	Nanjing	China	Nanjing Olympic Sports Centre Stadium	—
November 16, 2013	Hangzhou	China	Yellow Dragon Sports Centre Stadium	—
November 24, 2013	Shenzhen	China	Shenzhen Bay Sports Centre Stadium	—
April 11, 2014	Sydney	Australia	Allphones Arena	—
April 25, 2014	Guiyang	China	Guiyang Olympic Sports Centre Stadium	—
May 2, 2014	Shanghai	China	Shanghai Stadium	50,000
May 10, 2014	Changsha	China	He Long Stadium	—
May 17, 2014	Hefei	China	Hefei Olympic Sports Centre Stadium	—
May 24, 2014	Beijing	China	Workers' Stadium	—
May 31, 2014	Zhengzhou	China	Henan Province Sports Centre	—
June 28, 2014	Qingdao	China	Yizhong Sports Center	—
July 12, 2014	Dalian	China	Dalian Sports Centre Stadium	—
July 19, 2014	Changzhou	China	Changzhou Olympic Sports Centre Stadium	—
September 6, 2014	Guangzhou	China	Tianhe Stadium	—
September 13, 2014	Taiyuan	China	Shanxi Sports Stadium	—
November 14, 2014	Kuala Lumpur	Malaysia	Putra Indoor Stadium	—
November 15, 2014	Kuala Lumpur	Malaysia	Putra Indoor Stadium	—
November 19, 2014	Hong Kong		AsiaWorld–Expo	—
November 20, 2014	Hong Kong		AsiaWorld–Expo	—
November 21, 2014	Hong Kong		AsiaWorld–Expo	—
November 22, 2014	Hong Kong		AsiaWorld–Expo	—
November 23, 2014	Hong Kong		AsiaWorld–Expo	—
November 24, 2014	Hong Kong		AsiaWorld–Expo	—
December 27, 2014	Singapore		Singapore National Stadium	30,000
April 11, 2015	Chengdu	China	Chengdu Sports Centre Stadium	—
April 18, 2015	Chongqing	China	Chongqing Olympic Sports Centre Stadium	—
April 25, 2015	Tianjin	China	Tianjin Olympic Centre Stadium	—
May 1, 2015	Xi'an	China	Shaanxi iRENA	—
May 9, 2015	Wuhan	China	Wuhan Sports Center Stadium	—
May 16, 2015	Nanjing	China	Nanjing Olympic Sports Centre Stadium	—
May 23, 2015	Hangzhou	China	Yellow Dragon Sports Centre Stadium	—
June 6, 2015	Jinan	China	Jinan Olympic Sports Centre Stadium	—
June 13, 2015	Xiamen	China	Xiamen Sports Centre Stadium	—
June 20, 2015	Shenzhen	China	Shenzhen Bay Sports Centre Stadium	—
September 12, 2015	Shenyang	China	Shenyang Olympic Sports Centre Stadium	—
September 19, 2015	Luoyang	China	Luoyang Sports Centre Stadium	—
September 26, 2015	Foshan	China	Century Lotus Stadium	—
October 17, 2015	Xuzhou	China	Xuzhou Olympic Sports Centre Stadium	—
October 24, 2015	Lishui	China	Lishui Stadium	—
November 7, 2015	Suzhou	China	Suzhou Sports Center	—
November 14, 2015	Nanchang	China	Jiangxi Olympic Sports Centre Stadium	—
December 20, 2015	Kunming	China	Kunming Tuodong Sports Centre Stadium	—
Total				1,800,000

== Live album ==
Opus Jay World Tour

Live album by Jay Chou
- Released: May 10, 2016
- Recorded: September 6, 2013
- Venue: Taipei Arena
- Genre: Mandopop
- Language: Mandarin
- Label: JVR Music

Jay Chou chronology
Aiyo, Not Bad (2014)	Opus Jay World Tour (2016)	Jay Chou's Bedtime Stories (2016)

Opus Jay World Tour (simplified Chinese: 魔天伦世界巡回演唱会; traditional Chinese: 魔天倫世界巡迴演唱會) is the fifth live album by Taiwanese singer Jay Chou, released on May 10, 2016, by JVR Music and included a date filmed at Taipei Arena on September 6, 2013, from the Opus Jay World Tour.

=== Track listing ===
DVD

1. "Opening"
2. "Exclamation Point" (驚嘆號)
3. "Dragon Fist" (龍拳)
4. "The Final Battle" (最後的戰役)
5. "The Rooftop" (天台) feat. Devon Song
6. "A Larger Cello" (比較大的大提琴) feat. Cindy Yen, Gary Yang, Devon Song & Darren Chiu
7. "Slow Dance" (快門慢舞) feat. Cindy Yen & Darren Chiu
8. "Fight Dance" (打架舞) feat. Devon Song & Darren Chiu
9. "You are Everywhere" (哪裡都是你)
10. "All the Way North" (一路向北)
11. "Secret That Can't Be Told" (不能說的秘密)
12. "Nunchucks" (雙截棍)
13. "Obviously" (明明就)
14. "Mine Mine"
15. "Tornado" (龍捲風)
16. "Eunuch With a Headache" (公公偏頭痛)
17. "Blue and White Porcelain" (青花瓷)
18. "Basketball Match" (鬥牛) / "Sailor Afraid of Water" (水手怕水) / "Big Ben" (大笨鐘)
19. "Rainbow" (彩虹) / "Orbit" (軌跡)
20. "Sign Language" (手語)
21. "I Find it Hard to Say" (開不了口)
22. "Ukulele" (烏克麗麗)
23. "Sunshine Homeboy" (陽光宅男) feat. Cindy Yen, Gary Yang, Devon Song & Darren Chiu

CD 1

1. "Exclamation Point" (驚嘆號)
2. "Dragon Fist" (龍拳)
3. "The Final Battle" (最後的戰役)
4. "The Rooftop" (天台) feat. Devon Song
5. "A Larger Cello" (比較大的大提琴) feat. Cindy Yen, Gary Yang, Devon Song & Darren Chiu
6. "Slow Dance" (快門慢舞) feat. Cindy Yen & Darren Chiu
7. "Fight Dance" (打架舞) feat. Devon Song & Darren Chiu
8. "You are Everywhere" (哪裡都是你)
9. "All the Way North" (一路向北)
10. "Secret That Can't Be Told" (不能說的秘密)
11. "Nunchucks" (雙截棍)

CD 2

1. "Obviously" (明明就)
2. "Mine Mine"
3. "Tornado" (龍捲風)
4. "Eunuch with a Headache" (公公偏頭痛)
5. "Blue and White Porcelain" (青花瓷)
6. "Basketball Match" (鬥牛) / "Sailor Afraid of Water" (水手怕水) / "Big Ben" (大笨鐘)
7. "Rainbow" (彩虹) / "Orbit" (軌跡)
8. "Sign Language" (手語)
9. "I Find it Hard to Say" (開不了口)
10. "Ukulele" (烏克麗麗)
11. "Sunshine Homeboy" (陽光宅男) feat. Cindy Yen, Gary Yang, Devon Song & Darren Chiu
