= Children of the Sun (Jay Chou album) =

Studio album by Jay Chou
- Released: 25 March 2026
- Genre: Mandopop
- Length: 48:28
- Language: Mandarin
- Label: JVR Music
- Producer: Jay Chou

Jay Chou chronology
Greatest Works of Art (2022)	Children of the Sun (2026)

Singles from Children of the Sun
- 1. "Christmas Star" Released: 22 December 2023

Children of the Sun (Chinese: 太陽之子) is the sixteenth studio album by Taiwanese singer-songwriter Jay Chou, released on 25 March 2026 by JVR Music. The album was self-produced and composed by Chou, who wrote the album with his long-time collaborator Vincent Fang, along with Alan Huang, and Will Liu.

== Background ==
Children of the Sun marks Chou's first album in over four years, following the release of Greatest Works of Art in 2022. Regarding the four-year gap, Chou said: "Just because my last album came out in 2022 doesn't mean I spent three or four years writing this one. Over the years, I've slowed down the pace of life and gradually poured that energy into my music. I write when inspiration strikes, sing when I have the time and shoot music videos when I can. The most productive time has actually been these past few months since the concert tour ended. If I didn't tour, play basketball or wait for Vincent Fang to write the lyrics, maybe I could finish an album in a month."

The album's title was inspired by a nickname given to Chou by the Hong Kong singer Jacky Cheung in May 2023, during Chou's Carnival World Tour stop in Hong Kong. The stop coincided with days of rain that happened to clear shortly before each performance, leading Cheung to send Chou a box of mangoes with a handwritten note labelled "Children of the Sun". (Note: 太陽之子 can translate to either "Children of the Sun" or "Child of the Sun".)

== Music and composition ==
The album opens with its title track, which blends classical and rock elements with lyrics about confronting and overcoming one's inner darkness. "My Daughter, Your Highness", dedicated to and featuring voice memos from Chou's youngest daughter, details Chou's experience as a father with a "cheerful melody".

== Promotion and release ==
The first teaser for the album, featuring visuals inspired by Gustav Klimt's painting The Kiss, was released on March 18. Subsequent teasers were released daily until March 23.

In mainland China, Tencent Music launched exclusive pre-orders for the album on March 19, which included limited collectible bundles through QQ Music and Kugou Music.

A music video for the title track was released on 24 March 2026. A screening for the video co-hosted by Chou was held in Taipei on the same day, which was attended by 100 fans selected by lottery. The album was released digitally a day later on 25 March; a worldwide physical release followed on 10 April 2026.

== Commercial performance ==
The album sold two million copies on QQ Music two days after its release.

== Track listing ==
All music is composed by Jay Chou.

No.	Title	Lyrics	Notes	Length
1.	"Children of the Sun" (太陽之子)	Vincent Fang		4:57
2.	"Sicily" (西西里)	Vincent Fang		3:49
3.	"The Day It Rained" (那天下雨了)	Jay Chou		3:43
4.	"The Girl from Hunan" (湘女多情)	Vincent Fang		3:58
5.	"Who Cares" (誰稀罕)	Jay Chou		4:22
6.	"Aurora in July" (七月的極光)	Vincent Fang		3:13
7.	"Aegean Sea" (愛琴海)	Will Liu		3:34
8.	"I Do"	Vincent Fang		3:36
9.	"Saint" (聖徒)	Alan Huang		2:55
10.	"My Daughter, Your Highness" (女兒殿下)	Jay Chou		3:44
11.	"Gold Rush Town" (淘金小鎮)	Vincent Fang		4:10
12.	"Country Road" (鄉間的路)	Vincent Fang		3:22
13.	"Christmas Star" (聖誕星)	Jay Chou	featuring Gary Yang	3:01
Total length:				48:28

== Personnel ==
Adapted from Tidal.

- Jay Chou – vocals, producer, composer (1-13)
- Gary Yang – vocals (track 13), recording engineer
- A-Tai (陳陸泰) – mastering engineer
- Yanis Huang – mixing engineer (1, 2, 4, 10, 13); recording arrangements (1, 2,4,10,13)
- Michael Lin – mixing engineer (3), recording arrangements (3)
- Itun Zhou (周已敦) – mixing engineer (5–9, 11–12)
- LuuX (呂尚霖) – recording arrangements (5, 8, 11)
- Patrick Brasca – recording arrangements (5–9, 11, 12)
- Max Aidan – recording arrangements (6)
- Johnpiz (蔣希謙) – recording arrangements (7, 12)
- Li Wangzhe (李汪哲) – recording engineer (3, 11)
- Vincent Fang – director (2, 4, 6); lyricist (1, 2, 4, 6, 8, 11, 12)
- Will Liu - lyricist (track 7)

== Charts ==
=== Weekly charts ===
Weekly chart performance for Children of the Sun
Chart (2026)	Peak position
China Physical Albums (TME)	2
Hong Kong Albums (HKRMA)	2
Japanese Albums (Oricon)	36
New Zealand Albums (RMNZ)	37

=== Monthly charts ===
Monthly chart performance for Children of the Sun
Chart (2026)	Peak position
China Physical Albums (TME)	4
