= Fang Wen Shan =

Fang Wen Shan (方文山) may refer the following names in Hanyu Pinyin:

- Bangmunsan (방문산), a mountain in the South Korea
- Vincent Fang (born 1969), Taiwanese lyricist
