= I Truly Believe =

Single by Jay Chou

from the album Greatest Works of Art
- Language: Mandarin
- Released: December 16, 2019
- Recorded: 2019
- Genre: Pop
- Length: 4:26
- Label: JVR Music
- Songwriter: Vincent Fang
- Producer: Jay Chou

Jay Chou singles chronology
"Won't Cry" (2019)	"I Truly Believe" (2019)	"Mojito" (2020)

Music video
- "I Truly Believe" on YouTube

"I Truly Believe" (Chinese: 我是如此相信; pinyin: Wǒ shì rúcǐ xiāngxìn) is a song by Taiwanese singer-songwriter Jay Chou. It was released for digital download and streaming on December 16, 2019, under JVR Music. It was included in Chou's fifteenth studio album Greatest Works of Art, which was released in July 2022.

"I Truly Believe" was written by Vincent Fang while the production and composition of the track was handled by Chou. It serves as the theme song for the Chinese action film Skyfire (2019), which stars Chou's wife Hannah Quinlivan. Commercially, the song reached number one on the TME Uni Chart in China and re-charted in Malaysia, Singapore, and Taiwan after the release of Greatest Works of Art in 2022.

== Background and release ==
"I Truly Believe" was released as the theme song to support the movie Skyfire, which stars Chou's wife Hannah Quinlivan. As a former film director with an interest in the growth of Chinese-language cinema, Chou felt moved after watching the film and subsequently wrote the song.

The track captures Chou's emotions following the movie, with the chorus lyrics expressing heartfelt gratitude to his fans and the audience. To promote the film's box office performance, the song was initially only available to listeners who had watched the movie, before it was officially released.

== Music video ==
The music video for "I Truly Believe" intersperses scenes from Skyfire.

== Accolades ==
On January 16, 2021, the song won the 43rd Top Ten Chinese Golden Songs Mandarin Song Award.

== Credits and personnel ==
- Jay Chou – vocals, background vocals, production, music video director
- Vincent Fang – lyrics
- Yanis Huang – arrangement

== Charts ==
Chart performance for "I Truly Believe"
Chart (2019–2022)	Peak position
China (TME Uni Chart)	1
Malaysia Chinese Chart (RIM)	10
Singapore Regional (RIAS)	15
Taiwan (Billboard)	18

== Release history ==
Release dates and formats
Region	Date	Format	Label
Various	December 16, 2019	Digital download; streaming	JVR Music
