= Still Wandering =

Single by Jay Chou

from the album Greatest Works of Art
- Language: Mandarin
- Released: July 15, 2022
- Genre: Pop; R&B
- Length: 4:25
- Label: JVR Music
- Songwriter: Vincent Fang
- Producer: Jay Chou

Jay Chou singles chronology
| "Greatest Works of Art" (2022) | "Still Wandering" (2022) | "Christmas Star" (2023) |

Music video
- "Still Wandering" on YouTube

"Still Wandering" (Chinese: 還在流浪; pinyin: Hái zài liúlàng) is a song by Taiwanese singer-songwriter Jay Chou. It was released on July 15, 2022, as part of his fifteenth studio album Greatest Works of Art (2022) under JVR Music. The song was written by Vincent Fang, who also handled production.

== Background ==
"Still Wandering" reflects on Chou's memories with a former lover, with its lyrical content containing places that they shared moments, such as, "By the time you get my letter, I'll still be out wandering / The alley we walked down holding hands together / The church where we had our first kiss, I still remember / And that wall where we painted our hearts together".

== Music video ==
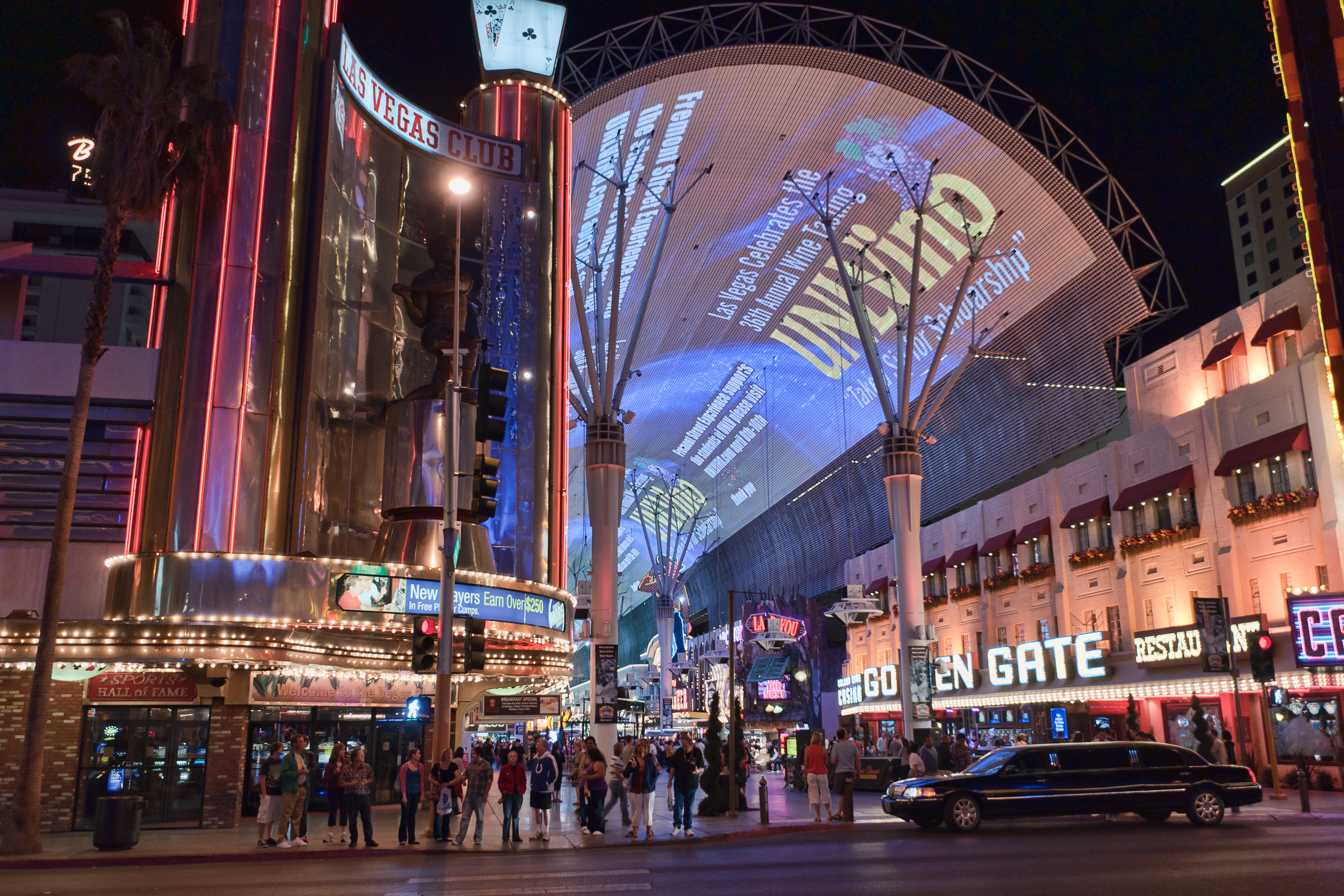
The music video was filmed in Las Vegas, including at Fremont Street.

The music video for "Still Wandering" was shot in Las Vegas, United States. It switches from Chou walking along the streets of the city to him at his house, and eventually packing his belongings in a suitcase.

== Credits and personnel ==
- Jay Chou – vocals, background vocals, production
- Vincent Fang – lyrics
- Yanis Huang – arrangement

== Charts ==
Chart performance for "Still Wandering"
| Chart (2022) | Peak position |
|---|---|
| China (TME UNI Chart) | 2 |
| Hong Kong (Billboard) | 5 |
| Malaysia (Billboard) | 5 |
| Malaysia Chinese Chart (RIM) | 1 |
| Singapore (RIAS) | 6 |
| Taiwan (Billboard) | 1 |

== Release history ==
Release dates and formats
| Region | Date | Format | Label |
|---|---|---|---|
| Various | July 15, 2022 | Digital download; streaming | JVR Music |
