= Wow! (Jay Chou album) =

Exclamation Mark

Studio album by Jay Chou
- Released: 11 November 2011
- Recorded: 2011
- Genre: Mandopop
- Language: Mandarin
- Label: JVR
- Producer: Jay Chou

Jay Chou chronology
The Era 2010 World Tour (2011)	Exclamation Mark (2011)	Opus 12 (2012)

Singles from Wow!
- 1. "Exclamation Point" Released: 24 October 2011; 2. "Mine Mine" Released: 4 November 2011

Wow! or known as Exclamation Point (traditional Chinese: 驚嘆號; simplified Chinese: 惊叹号; pinyin: Jīng Tàn Hào) is the eleventh studio album by Taiwanese singer Jay Chou, released on 11 November 2011 by JVR Music.

The album was nominated for three Golden Melody Awards and won for Best Album Packaging.

== Track listing ==
All music is composed by Jay Chou.

CD
No.	Title	Lyrics	Length
1.	"Exclamation Point" (驚嘆號)	Vincent Fang	3:51
2.	"Enchanting Melody" (迷魂曲)	Vincent Fang	3:49
3.	"Mine Mine"	Jay Chou	4:26
4.	"Princess Syndrome" (公主病)	Jay Chou	3:39
5.	"How Are You" (你好嗎)	Josh Lo, Chavy Lee	3:42
6.	"Healing Rice Dumpling" (療傷燒肉粽)	Jay Chou	3:06
7.	"Piano of Sorrow" (琴傷)	Vincent Fang	3:20
8.	"Sailor Afraid of Water" (水手怕水)	Alang Huang	2:40
9.	"Not the End of the World" (世界未末日)	Vincent Fang	4:21
10.	"Shadow Puppetry" (皮影戲)	Action Tang	3:27
11.	"The Goddess of Race" (超跑女神)	Vincent Fang	2:35

DVD
No.	Title	Length
1.	"Exclamation Point" (驚嘆號)
2.	"Enchanting Melody" (迷魂曲)

== Awards ==
Award	Category	Nominated work	Result
Golden Melody Awards	Best Mandarin Male Singer	Jay Chou for Wow!	Nominated
Golden Melody Awards	Best Musical Arranger	Jay Chou for "Sailor Afraid of Water"	Nominated
Golden Melody Awards	Best Album Packaging	Mori Chen for Wow! (Limited USB Edition)	Won
