= Won't Cry =

Single by Jay Chou and Ashin

from the album Greatest Works of Art
- Released: 16 September 2019
- Genre: Pop
- Length: 3:42
- Label: JVR Music
- Songwriter: Vincent Fang

Jay Chou and Ashin singles chronology
"If You Don't Love Me, It's Fine" (2018)	"Won't Cry" (2019)	"I Truly Believe" (2019)

Music video
- "Won't Cry" on YouTube

"Won't Cry" (Chinese: 說好不哭) is a song by Taiwanese singer-songwriter Jay Chou and Mayday vocalist, Ashin. Written by lyricist Vincent Fang and composed by Chou, it serves as the third single from Chou's fifteenth studio album, Greatest Works of Art (2022). It was released on 16 September 2019 on digital platforms under the label JVR Music.

The song saw great commercial success upon release. Twenty-five minutes after it was made available, 2.29 million downloads of the song were recorded in mainland China. Less than two hours after its release, total digital sales had exceeded ¥11 million ($1.5 million). It peaked at number one on the single charts in China, Malaysia and Singapore, and number five on the US World Digital Songs chart. In 2022, it charted at number six on the Billboard Taiwan Songs chart.

== Background and composition ==
"Won't Cry" is a love song about "fulfill" and "promise". This beautiful love story was played slowly only with piano. The whole song is based on the piano, and the string is weaving a lyrical scene. The atmosphere of a love movie; the lyrics are the first person of the boy, and the mood transition and story line of this love; a few short lyrics that illustrates the love between men and women because they consider each other too much. The delicate thoughts express their enthusiasm, which makes them easy to resonate and bring in feelings; each love has its own grievances and helplessness. Even if it is going to break up, it is necessary to "won't cry " and smile.

== Release ==
"Won't Cry" was released on 16 September 2019. In half an hour, the total sales volume reached 2 million copies across QQ Music, KuGou Music, and KuWo Music. The single achieved the highest digital sales record on QQ Music and earned the Gold Diamond certification with 15 million RMB within 12 hours. On September 17, the song had achieved a total sales of 5.485 million copies. As of 2019, the total sales reached 16.456 million RMB, ranking seventh in the 2019 digital album sales list.

== Music video ==
The music video was directed by Muh Chen, describing the story of a pair of lovers in Tokyo. The director invited the Japanese actress Ayaka Miyoshi and actor Keisuke Watanabe to perform in the music video. The two of them played as a dream couple, with the girl first working at a tea shop and meeting the boy while making a delivery. The two begin going out together, and the girl supports the boy's interest in photography by signing him up for an international photography school. The boy is accepted and had to go abroad for further study. Upon hearing this, the girl gives the boy a new camera and watches him leave. Finally, the boy returns to the girl after he finished his studies.

Jay Chou and Ashin also performed in the video, playing the piano and guitar respectively. It was filmed in Tokyo at the top floor of a building.

== Promotion and live performances ==
On 10 September 2019, Jay Chou uploaded a photo of Jiugongge on his personal social networking site to announce "Won't Cry" and again announced that he would premiere a new song at 11:00 on 16 September. Jay Chou's text: "The first broadcast at 11:00 on the 16th, I can only say that if you don't catch the first broadcast, you will cry! Just like watching the game, others have told you who won the game... then you will say, 'Why don’t you tell me the first broadcast early', then I will say, I have already told you...”

This song used for the first time during Mayday's 2019 concert tour Just Rock it!!! - Blue at Hongkou Football Stadium, Shanghai on 25 October 2019 with Jay Chou as a special guest star. And the live music video was released through B'in Music channel on 25 January 2020.

== Charts ==
Chart performance for "Won't Cry"
Chart (2019–2022)	Peak position
China (TME UNI Chart)	1
Malaysia (RIM)	1
New Zealand Hot Singles (RMNZ)	25
Singapore (RIAS)	1
Taiwan (Billboard)	6
US World Digital Songs (Billboard)	5
