= Greatest Works of Art =

2022 studio album by Jay Chou

Studio album by Jay Chou
- Released: 15 July 2022
- Genre: Mandopop
- Length: 44:18
- Language: Mandarin
- Label: JVR Music
- Producer: Jay Chou

Jay Chou studio album chronology
The Invincible Concert Tour (2019)	Greatest Works of Art (2022)	Children of the Sun (2026)

Singles from Greatest Works of Art
- 1. "Waiting for You" Released: 18 January 2018; 2. "If You Don't Love Me, It's Fine" Released: 14 May 2018; 3. "Won't Cry" Released: 16 September 2019; 4. "I Truly Believe" Released: 16 December 2019; 5. "Mojito" Released: 12 June 2020; 6. "Greatest Works of Art" Released: 6 July 2022

Greatest Works of Art (traditional Chinese: 最偉大的作品; simplified Chinese: 最伟大的作品; pinyin: Zuì Wěidà de Zuòpǐn) is the fifteenth studio album by Taiwanese singer-songwriter Jay Chou, released on 15 July 2022 by JVR Music. It is Chou's first album since Jay Chou's Bedtime Stories in 2016. The album draws inspiration from European art, and features genres such as pop, R&B, and soft rock.

Greatest Works of Art was preceded by six singles released from 2018 to 2022—"Waiting for You" with Gary Yang, "If You Don't Love Me, It's Fine", "Won't Cry" with Mayday vocalist Ashin, "Mojito", and the title track "Greatest Works of Art." The song "I Truly Believe" was released in 2019 as the theme for the 2019 Chinese action film Skyfire. The title track and "Still Wandering" also had music videos shot for them, released in July 2022.

The album experienced commercial success, selling over 200,000 copies in its first week of release in Taiwan and went on to become the country's best-selling album of 2022. It additionally peaked at number one on the Hong Kong album charts and the top-forty in Australia and New Zealand. It was the best-selling album of 2022 worldwide in pure sales, and holds the record for highest first-week sales, selling five million copies upon release in China in July 2022.

== Background ==
The album, named for its title track, is an homage to modernist European art and culture, with Chou himself being an avid art collector. Prior to the album's release, Chou said the material would be "old sounds recorded with vintage instruments".

Greatest Works of Art attracted attention due to users leaving low ratings for the album on Douban prior to its release, which Douban later removed and apologised for allowing in a post on Weibo.

== Promotion ==
Chou first released the album in June 2022 in a vlog filmed in Paris, where he also shot the music video for the title track. The album was promoted on Spotify billboards in New York City, Toronto and Taiwan, with Chou also releasing a track-by-track commentary edition of the album on Spotify.

== Commercial performance ==
According to a report released by the IFPI in March 2023, Greatest Works of Art was the best-selling album in pure sales worldwide in 2022 with 7.2 million of copies sold. The album sold five million copies in China in its first week, the highest first-week sales for an album worldwide, a record previously held by Adele's album 25, which sold 3.38 million copies in its first week of availability in the United States in 2015. It also sold 200,000 copies in Taiwan in its first week.

The album also became Chou's first album to chart in Australia, where it debuted at number 29 on the chart dated 25 July 2022.

== "Greatest Works of Art" music video ==
The title track of the album had its own music video recorded, released on 6 July 2022 on Jay Chou's official YouTube channel. The music video was filmed in Paris, and features references to several famous modernist painters in Europe within both the video and lyrics. The video begins with Chou and a friend strolling through the La Samaritaine department store in Paris at night dressed as security guards. The two then remove their disguises to reveal formal clothing, with Chou playing a piano and magically transporting the two back to Paris during the 1920s. The song Chou plays is from the soundtrack of his 2007 film Secret.

The two first encounter Belgian surrealist painter René Magritte, with Chou using magic to create the apple seen in Magritte's 1966 painting The Son of Man and the lyrics referencing his 1929 painting The Treachery of Images. Afterwards, the two meet Spanish surrealist painter Salvador Dalí, with Chou using magic to bend a spoon and inspiring Dalí to do the same with clocks, referencing Dalí's 1931 work The Persistence of Memory. The lyrics also mention Dalí's surrealist art piece Lobster Telephone. The video then cuts to the two interacting with Chinese painter Sanyu. Chou magically makes flowers bloom from the branches of a plant Sanyu was going to paint, leading Sanyu to gift Chou a painting of a cross-legged woman.

The song then transitions to the chorus, which references French artist Henri Matisse, Dutch post-impressionist painter Vincent van Gogh's 1889 painting The Starry Night, and Norwegian artist Edvard Munch's 1893 painting The Scream. Afterwards, the video has a piano interlude, with an appearance by Chinese pianist Lang Lang playing with Chou.

The video returns to Chou and his friend, with Chou inviting French painter Claude Monet to paint a portrait of him. Chou and Monet then admire ornate flower pattern wallpaper, with Chou magically making one physically appear and giving it to Monet, a reference to the painter's many works featuring water lilies. The video then cuts to Chou and his friend in the Café de la Rotonde looking through the various photographs they had taken of the famous painters they had seen during their journey, before they are met by Chinese poet Xu Zhimo, who shows them his writings. The lyrics also reference Xu's 1928 poem Leaving Cambridge Again.

The time travel effect ends before the two are able to figure out the identity of the pianist for whom they are searching, and the two return to the modern day with their photographs and Sanyu's painting. Finally, they are confronted by Lang Lang, who is the unknown pianist and has returned with them back to the present.

== Track listing ==
All music is composed by Jay Chou.

Greatest Works of Art track listing
No.	Title	Lyrics	Length
1.	"Intro"		0:29
2.	"Greatest Works of Art" (最偉大的作品)	Alang Huang; Di Xie	4:04
3.	"Still Wandering" (還在流浪)	Vincent Fang	4:25
4.	"Won't Cry" (說好不哭; with Ashin)	Vincent Fang	3:40
5.	"Cold Hearted" (紅顏如霜)	Vincent Fang	4:17
6.	"If You Don't Love Me, It's Fine" (不愛我就拉倒)	Jay Chou; Devon Song	4:06
7.	"Mojito"	Alang Huang	3:05
8.	"You Are the Firework I Missed" (錯過的煙火)	Vincent Fang	4:17
9.	"Waiting for You" (等你下課; with Gary Yang)	Jay Chou	4:30
10.	"Pink Ocean" (粉色海洋)	Vincent Fang	3:06
11.	"Reflection" (倒影)	Vincent Fang	3:54
12.	"I Truly Believe" (我是如此相信 From Movie Skyfire Theme Songs)	Vincent Fang	4:25
Total length:			44:23

== Charts ==
Chart performance for Greatest Works of Art
Chart (2022)	Peak position
Australian Albums (ARIA)	29
Hong Kong Albums (HKRMA)	1
Japanese Download Albums (Billboard Japan)	32
New Zealand Albums (RMNZ)	40
US World Albums (Billboard)	13

== See also ==
- List of best-selling albums in China
- List of best-selling albums in Taiwan
