= Aiyo, Not Bad =

Studio album by Jay Chou
- Released: 26 December 2014
- Recorded: 2014
- Studios: JVR Studio (Taipei); Platinum Studio (Taipei)
- Genres: Pop; R&B
- Length: 46:25
- Language: Mandarin
- Label: JVR
- Producer: Jay Chou

Jay Chou chronology
| Opus 12 (2012) | Aiyo, Not Bad (2014) | Opus Jay World Tour (2016) |

Singles from Aiyo, Not Bad
- 1. "What Kind of Man" Released: 18 December 2014; 2. "Handwritten Past" Released: 30 December 2014; 3. "Listen to Dad" Released: 1 February 2015; 4. "Rhythm of the Rain" Released: 10 April 2015

Aiyo, Not Bad (traditional Chinese: 哎呦, 不錯哦; simplified Chinese: 哎呦, 不错哦; pinyin: āi yōu bú cuò ó) is the thirteenth studio album by Taiwanese singer Jay Chou, released on 26 December 2014 by JVR Music.

== Accolades ==
The album was nominated for three Golden Melody Awards.

Awards and nominations
| Organization | Year | Category | Result | Ref. |
|---|---|---|---|---|
| QQ Music Awards | 2015 | Best Selling Digital Album of the Year | Won | |
| Golden Melody Awards | 2015 | Best Mandarin Album | Nominated | |
| Golden Melody Awards | 2015 | Best Album Producer (Jay Chou) | Nominated | |
| Golden Melody Awards | 2015 | Best Album Packaging (Jonah Lee) | Nominated | |
| Miguhui Awards | 2015 | Best Selling Album of the Year | Won | |

== Track listing ==
All music is composed by Jay Chou.

Aiyo, Not Bad track listing
| No. | Title | Lyrics | Length |
|---|---|---|---|
| 1. | "Yang-Ming Mountain" (陽明山) | Vincent Fang | 2:32 |
| 2. | "Stolen Love" (竊愛) | Alang Huang | 3:24 |
| 3. | "What Kind of Man" (算什麼男人) | Jay Chou | 4:48 |
| 4. | "Passer-by" (天涯過客) | Vincent Fang | 4:13 |
| 5. | "What's Wrong" (怎麼了 feat. Cindy Yen) | Vincent Fang | 3:52 |
| 6. | "Read Them Out in One Breath" (一口氣全唸對) | Vincent Fang | 2:38 |
| 7. | "I Want Summer" (我要夏天 feat. Gary Yang) | Jay Chou | 3:39 |
| 8. | "Handwritten Past" (手寫的從前) | Vincent Fang | 4:57 |
| 9. | "Extra Large Shoes" (鞋子特大號) | Vincent Fang | 3:41 |
| 10. | "Listen to Dad" (聽爸爸的話) | Jay Chou | 4:23 |
| 11. | "Mermaid" (美人魚) | Lu Yuxuan, Huang Jiexi | 3:39 |
| 12. | "Rhythm of the Rain" (聽見下雨的聲音) | Vincent Fang | 4:39 |
| Total length: | | | 46:25 |

== Legacy ==
"Mermaid" is a featured track in Ruby Gillman, Teenage Kraken, The Little Mermaid and Luca Mandarin soundtrack songs.

== Personnel ==
- Jay Chou - vocals, producer
- Vincent Fang - MV director (Track 4), lyricist (1, 4, 5, 6, 8, 9, 12)
- Yanis Huang - music arrangement (2, 3, 4, 8, 9, 10, 12)
- Funky Tu - MV director (Track 10)
- Lu Yuxuan - lyricist (Track 11)
- Huang Jiexi - lyricist (Track 11)
- Cindy Yen - vocals (Track 5)
- Gary Yang - vocals (Track 7)
- Huang Alang - lyricist (Track 2)

== Charts ==
=== Weekly charts ===
| Chart (2015) | Peak position |
|---|---|
| Hong Kong Albums (HKRMA) | 1 |
| US World Albums (Billboard) | 1 |

=== Year-end charts ===
| Chart (2014) | Position |
|---|---|
| Taiwanese Albums (Note: Best-selling albums of the year in Taiwan as reported by media outlets) | 2 |
