= Mojito (Jay Chou song) =

Single by Jay Chou

from the album Greatest Works of Art
- Released: 12 June 2020
- Genre: Mandopop
- Length: 3:05
- Label: JVR Music
- Composer: Jay Chou
- Lyricist: Alang Huang
- Producer: Jay Chou

Jay Chou singles chronology
"I Truly Believe" (2019)	"Mojito" (2020)	"Greatest Works of Art" (2022)

Music video
- Mojito on YouTube

"Mojito" is a single by Taiwanese singer Jay Chou. The song was written by Alang Huang and composed by Jay Chou. It was released on 12 June 2020, and was included on Chou's 2022 album Greatest Works of Art.

== Background ==
The title of the song, "Mojito", originates from a Cuban cocktail called mojito, and Alang Huang wrote the lyrics based on this drink. The song is full of Cuban flavors and Latin rhythms, and is written in the romantic mood of being mesmerized by the moment someone to meet the love. The song was arranged by Chou's longtime partner Yanis Huang, and in order to ensure that the song has an original Cuban feel, local Cuban musicians were recruited to perform the music.

== Music video ==
The music video for "Mojito" was released on 12 June 2020 on Jay Chou's official YouTube channel. The music video was filmed in Cuba, and Chou said that Cuba has always been a place he wanted to visit. During the filming, Chou and his friends wore summer shirts with local specialities and rode in a vintage car on the Malecón Marina Boulevard, which featured a salsa dance scene. After they arrived in Havana, the group also arrived at La Bodeguita Del Medio, where they recited the first line of the song's lyrics after the bartender mixed up a mojito.

== Commercial success ==
After the song was released on China's digital music platforms, the sales volume exceeded one million copies in one hour after the song was released. As of 3 pm on 12 June 2020, the cumulative total sales exceeded 3 million copies and the revenue exceeded CN¥9 million. When the song was released on QQ Music, the platform crashed for a while. The music video of the song reached 3 million views in 16 hours after it was released on YouTube.

In its first week of release, "Mojito" successfully climbed all the major music charts, including Taiwan's "iRadio Gold Chart", Hong Kong's "Hot Local Chart", "Chinese Songs Dragon and Tiger Chart", "Chill Club Recommended Chart", and China's "QQ Music Peak Chart - Hot Songs". On KKBOX, "Mojito" won the champion of KKBOX Chinese Singles Weekly Chart in Taiwan, Malaysia and Singapore, and the first runner-up in Hong Kong.

"Mojito" was one of the hottest Chinese songs in 2020, and was on the KKBOX 2020 Chinese Mid-Year Chart within a few months of its release. In the Q2 2020 Chinese Digital Music Industry Quarterly Report released by Tencent's 'You Music Research Institute', the song was ranked in the top of the list of 'Quarterly Best-Performing Top 10 Singles and MVs'. The song topped the "Top 10 Best Performing Singles and MVs of the Quarter" list. "Mojito" ranked fifth in the annual Hot Music Video Chart in Taiwan released by YouTube.

== Impact ==
With the release of the song, the interest in Cuban tourism in the Chinese-speaking region was aroused. According to data from China's online travel service platform, Ma Mee Wo Travel, as of noon on 12 June 2020, Cuba search heat was up 1,113% day-over-day. It also drove an increase in sales of mojitos, making them a hot product in bars, and the number of related instructional videos skyrocketed along with it

The song's exotic flavor has also led to many fans competing to cover it in various languages. Since the release of Mojito, the Chinese short video platform TikTok has started a "#mojito cover contest", with Chinese netizens mimicking the way Mojito is sung. On the TikTok Voice challenge "#mojito cover contest", the video had more than 41 million views. Some of the more famous cover adaptations include the "anti-drug version of mojito" sung by the Hainan anti-drug police, and the public health version of "Mojito" composed by the School of Public Health at Fudan University (licensed and agreed to be used by JVR Music), etc. On 15 July 2020, KMT Kaohsiung mayoral by-election contender Li Meijhen released an adapted version of the song "Kaohsiung Mojito" on Facebook; however, it was questioned by netizens about copyright and payment issues. JVR Music issued a statement saying that the company's colleagues did receive an inquiry from JVR Music's team and said that it was "a misunderstanding", and that Li Meijhen's team had taken down the video on its own initiative.

== Charts ==
Chart performance for "Mojito"
Chart (2020–2022)	Peak position
China (TME UNI Chart)	1
New Zealand Hot Singles (RMNZ)	24
Singapore (RIAS)	2
Taiwan (Billboard)	20
US World Digital Songs (Billboard)	7

== Awards ==
Year	Unit	Award	Result	Reference
2020	China Songs Top List	Most Popular Songs of the Year	Nominated	

=== Golden Melody Awards ===
Year	Unit	Award	Result
2021	32th Golden Melody Awards	Best Single Producer	Nominated
