= If You Don't Love Me, It's Fine =

Single by Jay Chou

from the album Greatest Works of Art
- Language: Mandarin
- Released: May 14, 2018
- Recorded: 2018
- Genre: Pop rock
- Length: 4:05
- Label: JVR Music
- Songwriter(s): Jay Chou
- Producer(s): Chou; Devon Song

Jay Chou singles chronology
"Waiting for You" (2018)	"If You Don't Love Me, It's Fine" (2018)	"Won't Cry" (2019)

Music video
- "If You Don't Love Me, It's Fine" on YouTube

"If You Don't Love Me, It's Fine" (Chinese: 不愛我就拉倒; pinyin: Bù ài wǒ jiù lādǎo) is a song by Taiwanese singer-songwriter Jay Chou. It was released on May 14, 2018, as the second single for this fifteenth studio album Greatest Works of Art (2022) under JVR Music. The song was written by Jay Chou whilst production was handled by Chou and Devon Song.

"If You Don't Love Me, It's Fine" remained at number one on the Billboard Radio China Top 10 chart for multiple consecutive weeks, and was ranked number four on the chart's annual ranking for 2018. In 2022, it charted at number two on the Singapore singles chart compiled by the Recording Industry Association Singapore (RIAS).

== Background ==
"If You Don't Love Me, It's Fine"
"If You Don't Love Me, It's Fine" is a pop rock song with its lyrics brushing off rejection.

"If You Don't Love Me, It's Fine" was written by Chou and Devon Song backstage at a concert. While preparing for a performance, Chou overheard Song say "Forget it if you don't want it" during a phone call. After the concert, Chou borrowed a guitar from a fellow musician and invited Song to his room to collaborate. Both of them worked on the song until 5 a.m., with Chou composing the melody while he and Song co-wrote the lyrics.

== Commercial performance ==
"If You Don't Love Me, It's Fine" reached number two in Singapore, number eight on the Chinese singles chart in Malaysia, and number seventeen on the Billboard Taiwan Songs chart during the week of July 30, 2022.

== Music video ==
The music video depicts the story of a motorcyclist and his lover. It opens with Chou gazing at the pouring rain from a high-ceiling room, featuring a grey marble grand piano and a Harley-style motorcycle. It then shifts to the motorcyclist racing down the expressway, interspersed with flashbacks of memories with his ex-lover.

== Accolades ==
The song won Top Songs of the Year at the 2019 Chinese Songs Music Festival held in Macau.

== Credits and personnel ==
- Jay Chou – vocals, background vocals, lyrics, production, music video director
- Devon Song – production
- Chen Shih-han – arrangement

== Charts ==
=== Weekly charts ===
Chart (2018–2022)	Peak position
China Airplay (Billboard Radio China)	1
Malaysia Chinese Chart (RIM)	8
Singapore (RIAS)	2
Taiwan (Billboard)	17

=== Year-end charts ===
Chart (2018)	Position
China Airplay (Billboard Radio China)	4

== Release history ==
Release dates and formats
Region	Date	Format	Label
Various	May 14, 2018	Digital download; streaming	JVR Music
