= The Era (album) =

Studio album by Jay Chou
- Released: 18 May 2010
- Recorded: 2010
- Genre: Mandopop
- Length: 45:19
- Language: Mandarin
- Label: JVR
- Producer: Jay Chou

Jay Chou chronology
Capricorn (2008)	The Era (2010)	The Era 2010 World Tour (2011)

Singles from The Era
- 1. "Superman Can't Fly" Released: 26 April 2010; 2. "Say Goodbye" Released: 18 May 2010; 3. "Long Time No See" Released: 18 May 2010

The Era (traditional Chinese: 跨時代; simplified Chinese: 跨时代; pinyin: Kuà Shí Dài) is the tenth studio album by Taiwanese singer-songwriter Jay Chou, released on 18 May 2010 by JVR Music. In Taiwan, the album reached number one on the G-Music chart and was the second best-selling album of the year.

== Songs ==
The tracks, "Superman Can't Fly", "Rain Falls All Night", and "The Era", are listed at number 2, number 10, and number 39 respectively on the 2010s Hit FM Top 100 Singles of the Year chart.

== Commercial performance ==
The Era debuted at number one on the G-Music album chart in Taiwan during the chart issue date 20 May 2010. It was the second best-selling album in Taiwan during 2010. In Hong Kong, the album reached number one on the HKRMA album chart.

== Awards ==
The album was nominated for six Golden Melody Awards and won for Best Mandarin Male Singer, Best Mandarin album, and Best Musical Arrangement for "Free Tutorial Video".

Year	Award	Category	Nominated work	Result
2011	Golden Melody Awards	Song of the Year	"Superman Can't Fly"	Nominated
2011	Golden Melody Awards	Best Mandarin Album	The Era	Won
2011	Golden Melody Awards	Best Mandarin Male Singer	Jay Chou for The Era	Won
2011	Golden Melody Awards	Best Album Producer	Jay Chou for The Era	Nominated
2011	Golden Melody Awards	Best Composer	Jay Chou for "Fireworks Cool Easily"	Nominated
2011	Golden Melody Awards	Best Lyricist	Vincent Fang for "Fireworks Cool Easily"	Nominated
2011	Golden Melody Awards	Best Musical Arranger	Again Tsai for "Free Tutorial Video"	Won

== Track listing ==
All music is composed by Jay Chou.

The Era – Standard edition
No.	Title	Lyrics	Length
1.	"The Era" (跨時代)	Alang Huang	3:16
2.	"Say Goodbye" (說了再見)	Ku Hsiao-li, Huang Ling-jia	4:44
3.	"Fireworks Cool Easily" (煙花易冷)	Vincent Fang	4:25
4.	"Free Tutorial Video" (免費教學錄影帶)	Alang Huang	4:01
5.	"Long Time No See" (好久不見)	Jay Chou	4:14
6.	"Rain All Night" (雨下一整晚)	Vincent Fang	4:18
7.	"Hip-hop Flight Attendant" (嘻哈空姐)	Vincent Fang	2:50
8.	"Tears of Scattered Emotion" (我落淚，情緒零碎)	Vincent Fang	4:20
9.	"Diary of Love" (愛的飛行日記 feat. Gary Yang)	Vincent Fang	4:16
10.	"Self-directed Act" (自導自演)	Jay Chou	4:17
11.	"Superman Can't Fly" (超人不會飛)	Jay Chou	4:59
Total length:			45:19

The Era – DVD
No.	Title	Length
2.	"Free Tutorial Video" (免費教學錄影帶)
11.	"Superman Can't Fly" (超人不會飛)

== Charts ==
=== Weekly charts ===
Chart (2010)	Peak position
Hong Kong Albums (HKRMA)	1
Japanese Albums (Oricon)	195
Taiwanese Albums (G-Music)	1

=== Year-end charts ===
Chart (2010)	Position
Taiwanese Albums (Note: Best-selling albums of the year in Taiwan as reported by media outlets)	2
