= Opus 12 =

2012 studio album by Jay Chou

Studio album by Jay Chou
- Released: 28 December 2012
- Recorded: 2012
- Genre: Mandopop
- Length: 48:08
- Language: Mandarin
- Label: Sony; JVR
- Producer: Jay Chou

Jay Chou chronology
Wow! (2011)	Opus 12 (2012)	Aiyo, Not Bad (2014)

Singles from Opus 12
- 1. "Hong-Chen Inn" Released: 5 December 2012; 2. "Ming Ming Jiu" Released: 5 December 2012; 3. "Big Ben" Released: 28 December 2012

Opus 12 (Chinese: 12新作; pinyin: Shí èr xīn zuò) is the twelfth studio album by Taiwanese singer-songwriter Jay Chou, released on 28 December 2012 by JVR Music. The album was nominated for four Golden Melody Awards.

== Release and promotion ==
On 5 December 2012, the album's lead single "Hong-Chen Inn" premiered on Hit FM. Chou had previously performed an erhu solo from the song during The World Tour in 2007, which later evolved into "Hong-Chen Inn". On the same day, "Ming Ming Jiu," the album's second single, premiered on Beijing Music Radio.

The album was made available for pre-order starting 12 December 2012, and was distributed in several formats: a "Hardcover Edition" and a "Limited USB Edition" (with a "Paperback Edition" also available). On 24 December, a Hit FM press conference revealed all 12 songs on the album. It was announced that these songs would debut on Hit FM on 27 December, the day before the album's release. During the album release press conference that same day, Chou announced that pre-orders had surpassed 200,000 copies.

=== Album cover ===
The cover of Opus 12 resembles that of Chou's previous album Capricorn (2008) and features an oil painting background. In the image, Chou is seen wearing a black see-through outfit and riding a mythical unicorn.

== Critical reception ==
Some critics felt that Opus 12 "offered a fresh sense of novelty," while others felt that "the production felt formulaic, making the overall direction of the album predictable." Despite these mixed reviews, several critics selected "A Larger Cello" as the standout track of the album.

== Commercial performance ==
"Hong-Chen Inn" and "Ming Ming Jiu" reached the top of the charts on iTunes in Taiwan, Hong Kong, Macau, Singapore, and Malaysia, as well as Baidu Music, Kugou Music, Xiami Music, and Yinyue Tai in China.

== Music videos ==
JVR Music released behind-the-scenes footage of the "Hong-Chen Inn" music video on its official YouTube channel on 10 December 2012, with the full version following on 11 December. The video stars Darren from Wave Brothers and Gülnezer Bextiyar, with Chou lip-syncing as a storyteller. It was filmed at the Huairou Studio in Beijing. The inn's plaque in the video was written by Vincent Fang, the song's lyricist.

Fang Wenshan wrote the lyrics for "Ming Ming Jiu" based on Chou's connotations of Scotland, including elements such as seagulls, bagpipes, and medieval Edinburgh. Chou filmed his scenes in Scotland. The video for "Big Ben" stars Liang Xinyi and Chou as a couple going through a breakup. It was filmed in London, including at the Big Ben.

== Track listing ==
All music is composed by Jay Chou.

Opus 12 – CD
No.	Title	Lyrics	Length
1.	"Four Seasons Train" (四季列車)	Vincent Fang	2:40
2.	"Sign Language" (手語)	Jay Chou	4:48
3.	"Eunuch with a Headache" (公公偏頭痛)	Vincent Fang	3:03
4.	"Ming Ming Jiu" (明明就)	Vincent Fang	4:18
5.	"Smile" (傻笑 feat. Cindy Yen)	Vincent Fang	4:50
6.	"A Larger Cello" (比較大的大提琴 feat. Lara Veronin & Gary Yang)	Vincent Fang	4:12
7.	"No Difference in Loving You" (愛你沒差)	Huang Lingjia	4:41
8.	"Hong-Chen Inn" (紅塵客棧)	Vincent Fang	4:35
9.	"Dream Initiated" (夢想啟動)	Kevin Lin	3:25
10.	"Big Ben" (大笨鐘)	Jay Chou	4:02
11.	"You are Everywhere" (哪裡都是你; From The Rooftop (film) Theme Songs)	Jay Chou	4:39
12.	"Ukulele" (烏克麗麗)	Jay Chou	2:55
Total length:			48:08

Opus 12 – DVD
No.	Title	Length
1.	"Worldly Tavern" (紅塵客棧)
2.	"Eunuch with a Headache" (公公偏頭痛)
3.	"Big Ben" (大笨鐘)

== Awards ==
Awards and nominations
Year	Award	Category	Nominated work	Result
2013	Golden Melody Awards	Best Mandarin Album	Opus 12	Nominated
2013	Golden Melody Awards	Best Mandarin Male Singer	Jay Chou for Opus 12	Nominated
2013	Golden Melody Awards	Best Album Producer	Jay Chou for Opus 12	Nominated
2013	Golden Melody Awards	Best Musical Arranger	Huang Yuxun for "A Larger Cello"	Nominated

== Charts ==
=== Weekly charts ===
Chart (2013)	Peak position
Chinese Albums (Sino Chart)	6
Hong Kong Albums (HKRMA)	1
Taiwanese Albums (G-Music)	1

=== Year-end charts ===
Chart (2012)	Position
Taiwanese Albums (Note: Best-selling albums of the year in Taiwan as reported by media outlets)	4

== Sales and certifications ==
Region	Certification	Certified units/sales
Singapore (RIAS)	Platinum	10,000^{*}
Taiwan	—	65,000
^{*} Sales figures based on certification alone.
