= Yanis Huang =

Chinese musician

Yanis Huang is a Taiwanese songwriter and producer. He works in arrangement, harmonizing, production, movie soundtracks, live performances, and concert production. He won awards, such as “Best Arrangement of the Year” in Beijing Pop Music Awards, "Best Original Song” in Golden Horse Awards, and "Song of the Year” in Golden Melody Awards.

== Career ==
He works as an exclusive writer for Warner Chappell Music. He has arranged and produced the works of singers including Jay Chou, Jeff Chang, Wilber Pan, Tiger Huang, Angela Chang, Fahrenheit, Power Station, Alex To, Elva Hsiao, Andrew Tan, Ricky Hsiao, Ariel Lin, Vivian Hsu, Where Chou, Cyndi Wang, and Weibird. His soundtracks include Rhythm of The Rain 聽見下雨的聲音, The Rooftop 天台, The Harbor 港都, L-O-V-E 愛到底 - 華山 22, and Your Name Engraved Herein 刻在我心底的名字. Huang and Jay Chou are friends and work partners. Chou makes requests or ask for feedback directly, and the two exchange ideas. Jay Chou's “Rice Field 稻香”, which won “Song of the Year” in the 20th Golden Melody Awards was arranged by Huang.

== Artistry ==
Huang had many discussions with the movie director during the arrangement of Your Name Engraved Herein 刻在我心底的名字. He read the film treatment carefully, made demos, and revised it based on feedback. He also collaborated with Chris Hou on the film soundtrack of Your Name Engraved Herein 刻在我心底的名字.

Huang shared in an interview that his songs had a lot to do with the songs he usually listens to. He recommends that young music talents should listen to a wide range of music, and practice developing melodies while watching movies or reading books.

== Works ==
=== Arrangements ===
Singer	Song	Year
Sam Lee	你走了	2004
Michelle Vickie	獨立、學著、如果不能愛	2004
Jordan Chan	離不開你	2004
Van Fan	愛情程式、在這裡分手、相愛	2004
Michelle Vickie	隱形的雪、想飛越、過渡時期、自然醒	2005
Sam Lee	很想說	2006
Michelle Vickie	白色羽毛	2006
Gigi Leung	謝謝你這些日子	2006
Energy	愛失控、虛假遊戲、不在乎有沒有以後	2006
Where Chou	等待花季	2007
Michelle Vickie	Aitai、也許、獨立、學著、如果不能愛、隱形的雪、想飛越、過渡時期、自然醒	2007
Michael Shih	笑輪迴	2007
Michael Shih	想你紀念日、我的、	2007
Michael Shih	我的沙發讓你躺、地球運轉手、閒閒來泡茶、孔雀魚、人生一首歌、	2007
Shin	我恨你	2007
Wilber Pan	愛不離	2007
MOMO TV	MOMO歡樂谷、玩具兵團要回家、快樂BABY-Q、水瓶裡的魚、扭扭體操、老爺車、加加油、See you tomorrow、小小星願	2008
Cyndi Wang	因為是你	2008
Elva Hsiao	時光隧道	2008
Ariel Lin	麵包的滋味/你的味道	2008
Alex To	未完待續	2008
Wilber Pan	同一個遺憾	2008
Jay Chou	稻香、喬克叔叔、時光機、蛇舞、花海	2008
Yungai Hayung (Landy)	我全都相信	2009
Fu Wei	風中的早晨、女人花、Just Once、對愛渴望	2009
Fahrenheit	留下來	2009
Cindy Yen	畫沙、熱氣球、舞帶威脅、很旅行的愛情、那年我們一起許願	2009
Cyndi Wang	瞬間	2009
Cyndi Wang	很愛	2009
Wilber Pan	無重力	2009
Tiger Huang	沒完沒了	2009
Michael Shih	天之驕子、歹勢、台語歌、魔力安全倒、阿布水	2009
Ariel Lin	你有我	2010
Nan Quan Mama	愛你，離開你	2010
Hebe Tien	給小孩	2010
Jay Chou	自導自演、煙花易冷、跨時代	2010
Michael Shih	麻雀雖小、豆花車倒攤、只是想要告讓你、黑面、十八、純情人的行船曲	2010
A-Lin	後來你好嗎	2011
Michael Shih	環島旅行、烘爐地之戀、情人裝vs.林柔均、台中腔、環島旅行(中)、四界全是你、天邊海角找無你、愛情卡路里、環島旅行(南)vs.林柔均、水果共和國	2011
Rainie Yang	二度戀愛	2011
Wilber Pan	我的電話、我們都怕痛	2011
A-Lin	勇敢的不是我	2011
Tiger Huang	愛情開箱文、順其自然	2011
Jay Chou	公主病、琴傷、你好嗎	2011
Selina Jen	愛我的每個人、夢	2011
Ella Chen	懂我再愛我	2012
Christine Fan	十七歲的北極星	2012
Angela Chang	有形的翅膀	2012
Joey Yung	正好、維加斯有點好萊塢	2012
Claire Kuo	放下	2012
Jolin Tsai	柵欄間隙偷窺你、彩色相片	2012
Jing Chang	痛也愛你、你走了、我往前	2012
Yen-J	悲觀樂觀	2012
Evan Yo	怎麼愛你都不夠、誰知道、想(弦樂)	2012
A-Lin	我能體諒	2012
Jay Chou	明明就、傻笑、比較大的大提琴、愛你沒差、紅塵客棧、大笨鐘、哪裡都是你	2012
Olivia Ong	守望	2013
Daniel Chan	把你寫進我的情歌裡	2013
Power Station	莫忘初衷(Never Alone)	2013
Alan Ko	故事畫面	2013
Terry Lin	煙花易冷	2013
Vivian Hsu	來愛我啦	2013
Michael Shih	社會黑暗	2013
Andrew Tan	皮膚、再痛也沒關係	2013
Coco Lee	Stuck On U偷心賊	2013
Ricky Hsiao	簡單的快樂	2013
Michael Shih	頭家、雙重標準、不想納稅、轉大人、黑白舞、鬼調歌頭、都更、不通戲弄我的鋼琴	2014
Wei Bird	在你身邊	2014
Jay Chou	竊愛、算什麼男人、天涯過客、手寫的從前、鞋子特大號、聽爸爸的話、聽見下雨的聲音	2014
Nine Chen	醒來以後	2015
Yungai Hayung (Landy)	失控(衛視中文台韓劇王的面孔 片尾曲)	2015
Alan Ko&Darren	兄弟還記得嗎	2015
Amei	高山青、風從哪裡來	2015
Jay Chou	床邊故事、說走就走、一點點、前世情人、英雄、不該、Now You See Me、愛情廢柴	2016
Nan Quan Mama	逆襲、環繞世界一周、心中的太陽、東山再起	2016
Angela Chang	眼淚	2017
Jay Chou / Gary	等你下課	2018
Jay Chou	說好不哭	2019
Jay Chou	我是如此相信	2019
Jay Chou	mojito	2020
Jacky Cheung	等風雨經過	2020
Jay Chou / Patrick Brasca	Six Degrees	2025
Jay Chou	太陽之子、西西里、湘女多情、女兒殿下、聖誕星	2026

=== Composition ===
Singer	Song	Year
Jacky Wu	多情的港口無情的天	1998
Yungai Hayung (Landy)	第六感、醉後、Touch Your Mind	1999
Joey Yung	你是我堅強的唯一理由	2000
SBDW	九十九種浪漫	2000
Jacky Wu	沒你的城市、不愛我的畫面	2000
Yee-ling Huang	愛情的八字	2001
Yungai Hayung (Landy)	淚不停	2001
Yungai Hayung (Landy)	書籤	2002
Billie Wang	別再說	2002
Nylon Chen	微笑的眼淚	2009
Alan Ko	故事畫面	2013
Yanis Huang	幸福透著光	2013
Jennifer Pan	我要幸福了	2014
Miya	殺豬刀	2014
Yanis Huang	愛如櫻	2016
Ailing Tai	不如沒問過	2017
Andrew Tan	翻轉世界	2018

=== Production ===
Singer	Album	Song	Year
Chou Girls	鄒女在唱歌	The entire album	2008
Billie	旅程	The entire album	2008
Vivian Hsu	聽見下雨的聲音電影原聲帶	來愛我啦	2013
Miya	我	殺豬刀、向前走、是我	2014
Yanis Huang	幻城原聲帶	愛如櫻	2016
Nan Quan Mama	拳新出擊	環繞世界一周、心中的太陽	2016
Crowd Lu	刻在你心底的名字電影片尾曲	刻在我心底的名字	2020

== Awards ==
Award	Song	Result
“Best Arrangement of the Year” in Beijing Pop Music Awards		Won
"Song of the Year” in Golden Melody Awards	Rice Field 稻香	Won
"Best Original Song” in Golden Horse Awards	Your Name Engraved Herein 刻在我心底的名字	Won
“Song of the Year” in Golden Melody Awards	Your Name Engraved Herein 刻在我心底的名字	Won
“Best Singles Producer” in Golden Melody Awards	Your Name Engraved Herein 刻在我心底的名字	Nominated
