= Vincent Fang (lyricist) =

Taiwanese lyricist (born 1969)

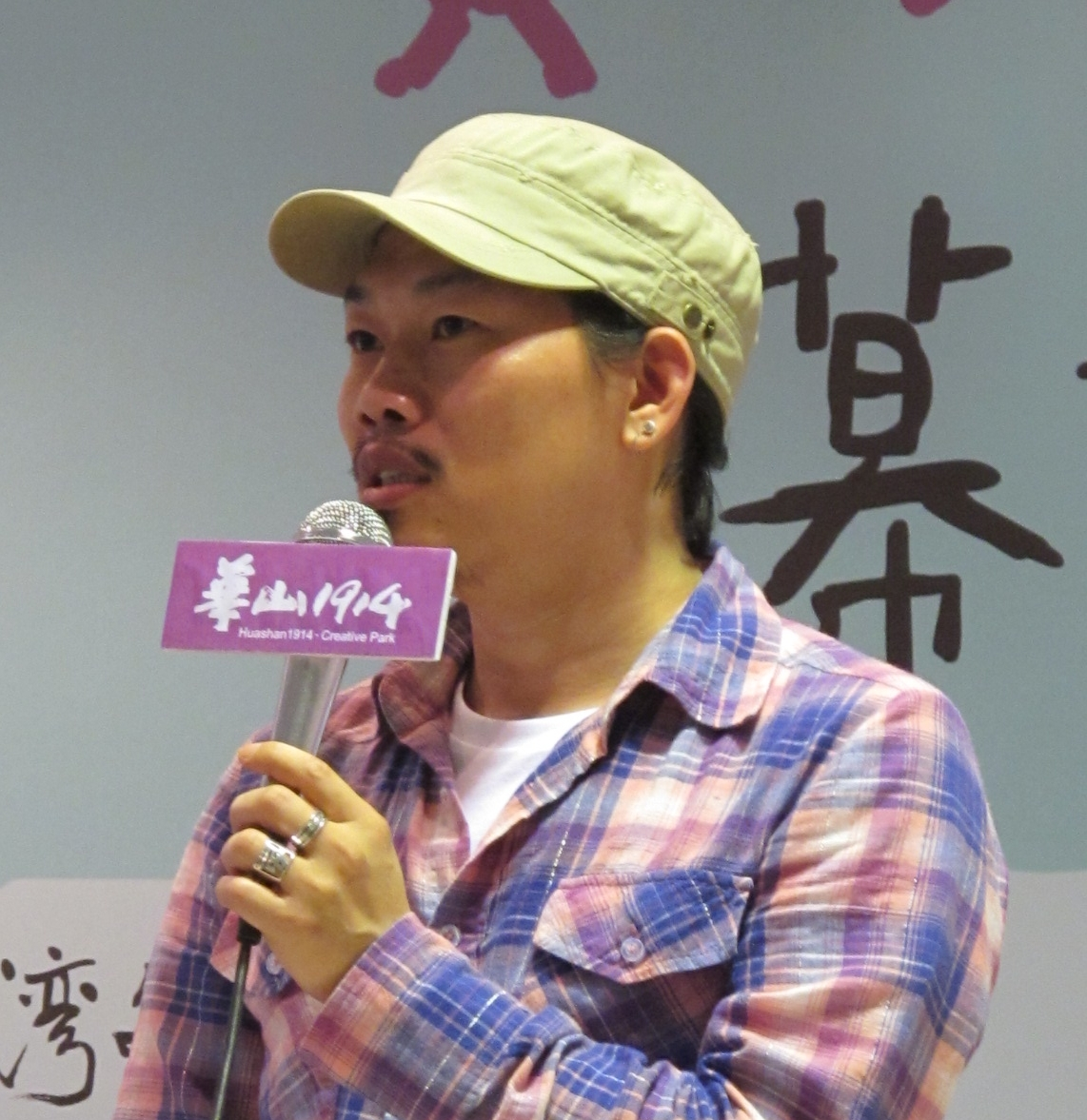
- Born: 26 January 1969 (age 57); Hualien County, Taiwan
- Occupations: Lyricist, author
- Awards: Golden Melody Awards – Best Lyricist; 2007 "青花瓷" (Blue and White Porcelain)
- Musical career
- Origin: Taiwan
- Genre: Mandopop
- Label: JVR Music

Vincent Fang (Chinese: 方文山; pinyin: Fāng Wénshān; born 26 January 1969) is a Taiwanese lyricist, best known for his collaboration with singer-songwriter Jay Chou. Fang has been nominated for multiple Golden Melody Awards, and won Best Lyricist at the 19th Golden Melody Awards for Jay Chou's "青花瓷" (Blue and White Porcelain) from On the Run. He is considered to be at the forefront of China Wind music, with his works often treated as poetry of artistic merit that garners high critical regard.

In 1997, he sent samples of his lyrics to record companies, hoping to find a new career that complemented his passion for writing. Record company owner Jacky Wu was impressed with his work and hired Fang to work with Chou, who had just started his songwriting career. In 2000, Chou released his first album (titled Jay) and since then produced albums in which Fang contributes the majority of the lyrics. Chou's fame grew rapidly across Asia, pulling Fang into the limelight as well.

Fang's lyrics are noted for covering a wide of issues from family to war, beyond what is normally discussed in love ballads. He is known for using a writing style similar to traditional Chinese poetry, making frequent references to Chinese history and folklore, esp. in Chinese style music (中國風), a fusion genre made popular in the 2000s (decade) by Jay Chou, fusing modern rock and contemporary R&B together with traditional Chinese music. He calls his style of lyrical poetry "Su Yan Rhyme Poetry 素顏韻腳詩", which has become a new poetry form in modern Chinese musical literature.

== Early life ==
Born in 1969, Vincent Fang grew up in Taiwan and was raised in what he calls a "blue-collar family". He is of Hakka Chinese ancestry with his ancestral home in Yudu, Jiangxi. In his youth, he gave very little effort in school and received poor grades. After graduating from high school, at the age of 20, Fang served his mandatory military service in the Republic of China Army. When he was off-duty, he spent his free time reading and watching movies, which triggered an interest in language and words.

After completing his military service in 1991, Fang worked over 20 odd jobs over the following 7 years, including newspaper deliveryman, electronics repairman, factory worker, security alarm serviceman and truck driver. Despite taking these jobs and having no formal post-secondary training in linguistics, he was determined to shift into a writing career. In 1992, he decided that his dream job would be a movie scriptwriter, which he complemented by taking several relevant night courses. After a year, he was no closer to his goal. He planned an alternate path to enter the film business: establish his stature in the entertainment industry by first entering music field as a lyricist, then transit into script writing.

== Music career ==
=== Entry into the music business ===
Over 2 years starting in 1995, he wrote more than 100 lyrics, hoping to use this collection to impress potential employers. To contact record producers, he searched the CD liner notes of popular Chinese singers for mailing addresses and sent his entire lyrics collection to them. Of more than 100 mails sent, only a single person replied: Jacky Wu, an influential television show host in Taiwan who was looking for new talent to join his record company. In 1997, at the age of 28, Fang signed the official contract to work as a lyricist. Wu arranged Fang to work with Jay Chou, a newly hired composer who just graduated from secondary school. Together, they wrote songs for popular Chinese artists but neither acquired much fame. Fang's talent was recognized after Chou began a successful singer-songwriter career that was partially attributable to Fang's lyrics.

=== Collaboration with Jay Chou ===
In 1998, Fang and Chou began to work together, initially using Fang's collection of 100 lyrics. For their first song, Chou composed a tune for Fang's "You are happier than before" which was placed in an album by Wu, their mentor. After several initial songs, it became habitual for Chou to conceptualize the song and write the melody first, subsequently to be filled by Fang's text. When singers requested songs from them, Fang would personally deliver the demo tape to the interested parties. Over a two-year period, their work was incorporated into various albums of hit singers and bands, such as Landy Wen, Valen Hsu, Leo Ku, S.B.D.W, and Jacky Wu. He also stars in Jay Chou's MTV "coral sea" 珊瑚海 where he played the protagonist of the story.

In 2000, Chou began his singing career with his debut CD Jay. Since then, Fang has been responsible for more than half of the lyrics in all Chou's albums. Despite Chou's reputation as a "mumble rapper", the audience's appreciation for Fang's lyrics is not compromised.

=== Awards ===
Fang's lyrics have twice won Taiwan's Golden Melody Awards; he was nominated for 8 years straight. Fang has won more than a dozen awards in Asia for his lyrical compositions.

== Other activities ==
Additionally, Fang has authored four books and established his own publishing company Chinapublishing (華人版圖) in March 2002. He is currently involved in the fashion label Story.

=== Literary works ===
- 《吳宗憲的深情往事》 (Jacky Wu's deep feelings and past)
- 《半島鐵盒》 (The iron box of the peninsular)
- 《演好你自己的偶像劇》 (Acting your roles in idol drama)
- 《關於方文山的素顏韻腳詩》 (About Vincent Fang's Su Yan Rhyme Poetry)
- 《中國風—歌詞裡的文字遊戲》 (China Wind Musical style - the literary and poetry games in the lyrics)
- 《青花瓷—隱藏在釉色裡的文字秘密》 (The song "Blue and White Porcelain" - the hidden literary meanings in the glaze)

== Discography ==
Children of the Sun (Chinese: 太陽之子) is the sixteenth studio album by Taiwanese singer-songwriter Jay Chou, released on 25 March 2026 by Alfa Music and JVR Music, including "Children of the Sun", "Sicily", "The Girl From Human", "The Aurora In July", "I Do", "Gold Rush Town", "Country Road".
