= Perth Rectangular Stadium =

Stadium in Vincent, Western Australia

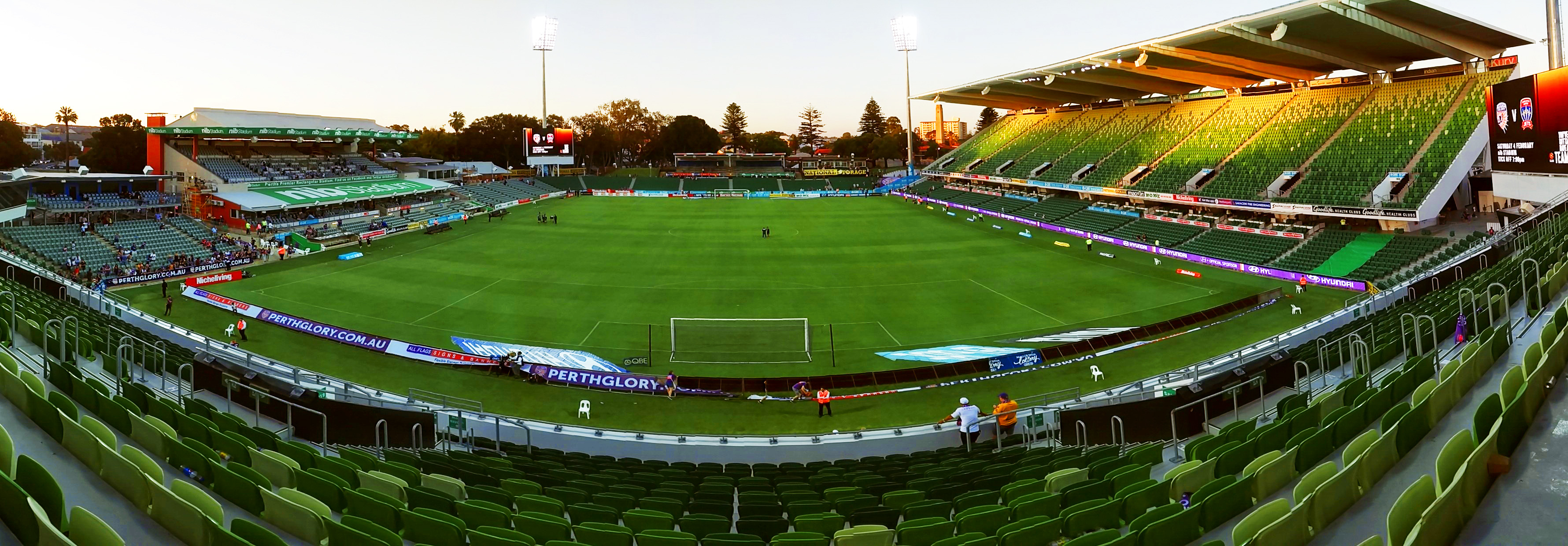
- Panoramica
- Interactive map of Perth Rectangular Stadium
- Full name: HBF Park
- Former names: Loton Park; Members Equity Stadium; ME Bank Stadium; nib Stadium; Perth Oval
- Location: Lord Street; Perth, Western Australia
- Coordinates: 31°56′45″S 115°52′12″E
- Owner: City of Vincent
- Operator: VenuesWest
- Capacity: 20,500 (Sports mode)
- Executive suites: 24
- Surface: Grass
- Scoreboard: LED Screen
- Record attendance: Overall: 32,000 (Concert, 2015); Sports: 27,473 (Interstate football, 1929)
- Public transit: Claisebrook

Construction
- Built: 1910
- Renovated: 2004, 2012 and 2023

Tenants
- Football Perth Glory (NSL, A-League) (1996–present); Australia national football team Rugby League Perth Bears (NRL) (2027–); Melbourne Storm (NRL) (2026); Rugby Union Western Force (Super Rugby) (2010–present); Australia national rugby union team Australian Rules East Perth Royals (WAFL) (1910–1939, 1941–1987, 1990–2003); Australia international rules team

Website
- www.hbfpark.com.au

Western Australia Heritage Register
- Type: State Registered Place
- Designated: 2 September 1998
- Reference no.: 2992

Perth Rectangular Stadium (known under naming rights as HBF Park) is a stadium located near the Perth central business district. It is primarily used for soccer and rugby union as the home ground of Perth Glory FC in the A-League Men and the Western Force in the Super Rugby Pacific. It is also set to host rugby league from 2027 when the Perth Bears join the National Rugby League (NRL).

The land on which the stadium was built, known as Loton Park, was made a public reserve in 1904, with the main ground developed several years later. From 1910 until 2003, it was known as Perth Oval and was the home ground of the East Perth Football Club in the West Australian Football League (WAFL). It hosted several of the competition's grand finals during that time. In 2004, the ground was redeveloped, altering it from an oval field to a rectangular field. It now hosts a capacity of 20,500 spectators. Perth based health insurer HBF have held naming rights to the stadium since 2021.

The stadium hosted games during the 2023 FIFA Women's World Cup and 2026 AFC Women's Asian Cup.

== Current use ==
The stadium is currently used for hosting sports events and concerts.

=== Sport ===
In sports mode the stadium has a capacity of around 20,500. Soccer club Perth Glory has played at the ground since 1996. The stadium is unusual among modern Australian stadiums for having a standing terrace at the northern end of the ground, called 'The Shed'.

The ground has hosted rugby union team Western Force since 2010. The Force's move to the stadium led to a minor redevelopment of facilities at the ground, including an increase in capacity and improved lighting.

For 2008 the stadium hosted WA Reds home matches in the Bundaberg Red Cup.

Since 2009, there have been annual NRL games played at the oval, generally as South Sydney Rabbitohs home games, with the Manly Warringah Sea Eagles joining in 2016. The stadium has housed the administrative facilities of the Western Australia Rugby League since 2003. The stadium will become the home ground of the newly formed NRL team the Perth Bears from 2027.

In 2015, the stadium hosted a 2018 FIFA World Cup qualifier between Australia and Bangladesh, the first A-international in Perth in over a decade.

The stadium was one of the host venues for the 2023 FIFA Women's World Cup.

=== Concerts ===
The capacity for concerts is now over 25,000. A record 32,000 crowd attended the Ed Sheeran concert in 2015.

== History ==
=== Early history ===
The land on which the stadium is built was known as Loton's Paddock after the previous owner William Loton, Lord Mayor of Perth. The paddock had been reclaimed from part of Stone's Lake, which was part of a lake system known as The Great Lakes District which included Lake Monger and Herdsman Lake.

Loton sold the land to the City of Perth in 1904 with the purpose of providing recreation for the residents of the area. After the 2004 redevelopment, part of the ground reverted to public open space and the original name, Loton Park was re-applied, to honour Loton, and Yoordgoorading, the Noongar name for the former lake.

Lacrosse was one of the main sports played on the oval from the early 1900s to the 1940s, being the home of the WA Lacrosse Association during this time. Australian rules football was also occasionally played on the oval from 1905.

In the early 1930s large white entry gates were built on the north west corner of the ground. These have since been heritage listed.

=== Soccer ===
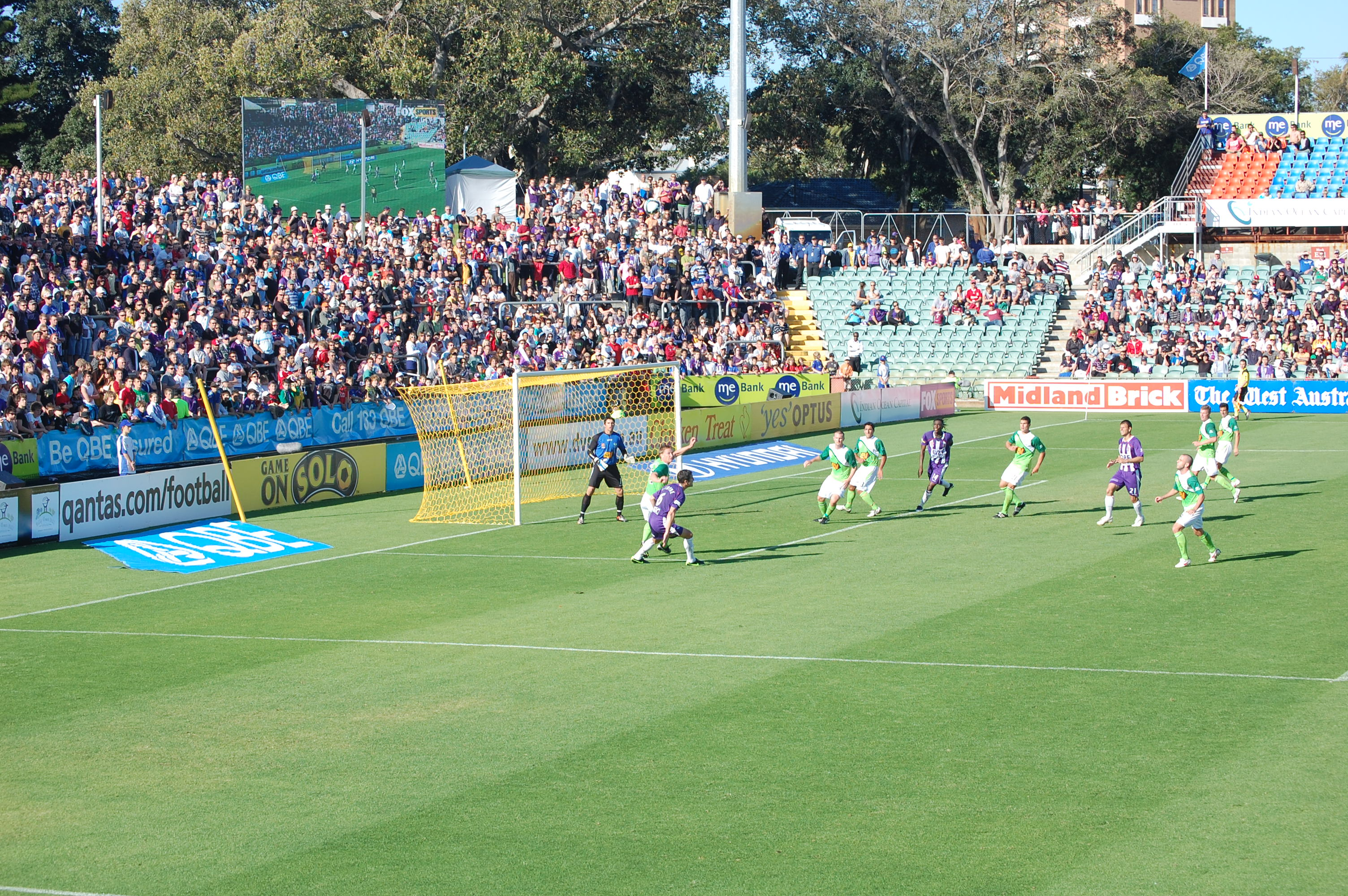
Perth Glory and North Queensland Fury in 2009 during an A-League match

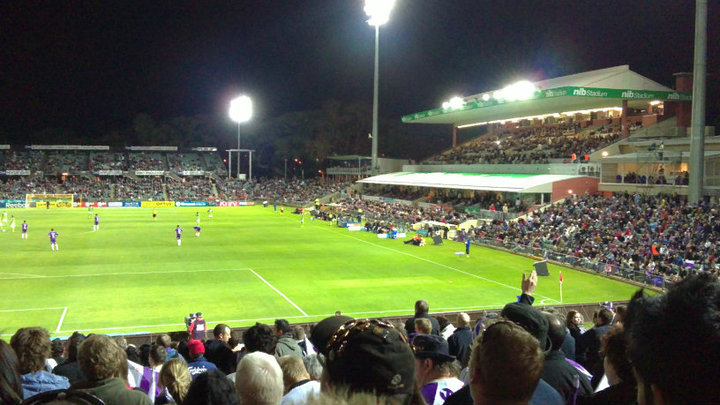
Perth Glory and North Queensland Fury in 2010 during an A-League match

Soccer was an early tenant at Loton Park, playing regular matches as early as 1903, when over 2,000 spectators attended a Charity Cup match between Olympic FC and Civil Service.

In 1905 the land was offered to the Western Australian British Football Association for £2,000, equivalent to A$337,400 in 2022, but the asking price was considered too high.

The venue was the scene of a humiliation in 1927 when the WA state team were thrashed 11–3 by Bohemians, a team representing Czechoslovakia.

Prior to the 2004 redevelopment, the venue was oval-shaped and, when Perth Glory entered the National Soccer League (NSL) in 1996, temporary stands were moved on to the pitch to get supporters closer to the action. After playing in these conditions for four years, it became apparent that the Glory would need their own rectangular stadium and, after Glory's proposed redevelopment of Leederville Oval was rejected, the Town of Vincent completely overhauled the ground into a rectangular stadium.

The venue hosted the 2014 W-League semi-final and grand final matches involving Perth Glory Women.

2015 saw the return of the Australia national soccer team to Perth after a 10-year absence, with a 5–0 2018 FIFA World Cup qualifier win against Bangladesh on 3 September, in front of a 19,495-strong crowd. The following year on 1 September the Socceroos returned for another World Cup qualifier against Iraq, with 18,923 in attendance. The stadium was due to host a 2022 FIFA World Cup qualifier against Kuwait in 2020; however, the COVID-19 pandemic meant that this did not go ahead. In June 2024, the stadium hosted a 2026 FIFA World Cup qualifier against Palestine.

Perth Rectangular Stadium was selected to host several group stage matches of the 2023 FIFA Women's World Cup. The venue received a $32 million upgrade before the tournament, which included new LED floodlighting, upgrades of player and media facilities, pitch improvements, new player races and bench areas, and additional temporary seating for spectators.

==== Men's international soccer ====
Game	Date	Team	Result	Team	Attendance	Part of
1	3 September 2015	Australia	5–0	Bangladesh	19,495	2018 World Cup qualification – Second Round
2	1 September 2016	Australia	2–0	Iraq	18,923	2018 World Cup qualification – Third Round
3	11 June 2024	Australia	5–0	Palestine	18,261	2026 World Cup qualification – Second Round

==== Women's international soccer ====
Game	Date	Team	Result	Team	Attendance	Part of
1	26 March 2018	Australia	5–0	Thailand	7,549	Friendly
2	26 June 2025	Australia	3–0	Slovenia	8,678	Friendly
3	29 June 2025	Australia	1–1	Slovenia	13,115	Friendly
4	8 July 2025	Australia	3–2	Panama	10,657	Friendly

===== 2023 FIFA Women's World Cup =====
The venue hosted five group stage matches of the 2023 FIFA Women's World Cup.

Game	Date	Team	Result	Team	Attendance	Part of
1	22 July 2023	Denmark	1–0	China	16,989	2023 FIFA Women's World Cup Group D
2	26 July 2023	Canada	2–1	Republic of Ireland	17,065	2023 FIFA Women's World Cup Group B
3	29 July 2023	Panama	0–1	Jamaica	15,987	2023 FIFA Women's World Cup Group F
4	1 August 2023	Haiti	0–2	Denmark	17,897	2023 FIFA Women's World Cup Group D
5	3 August 2023	Morocco	1–0	Colombia	17,342	2023 FIFA Women's World Cup Group H

===== 2024 AFC Women's Olympic Qualifying Tournament =====
Perth hosted six international matches over three match days as part of the second round of Asian qualifiers for the Paris 2024 Olympic Games. Perth Rectangular Stadium was originally scheduled to host all three match days however the second match day involving matches between Philippines and Australia, and Iran and Chinese Taipei was moved to larger capacity Perth Stadium due to strong demand.

Game	Date	Team	Result	Team	Attendance
1	26 October 2023	Chinese Taipei	1–4	Philippines	2,725
2	26 October 2023	Australia	2–0	Iran	18,798
5	1 November 2023	Philippines	1–0	Iran	3,111
6	1 November 2023	Australia	3–0	Chinese Taipei	19,084

===== 2026 AFC Women's Asian Cup =====
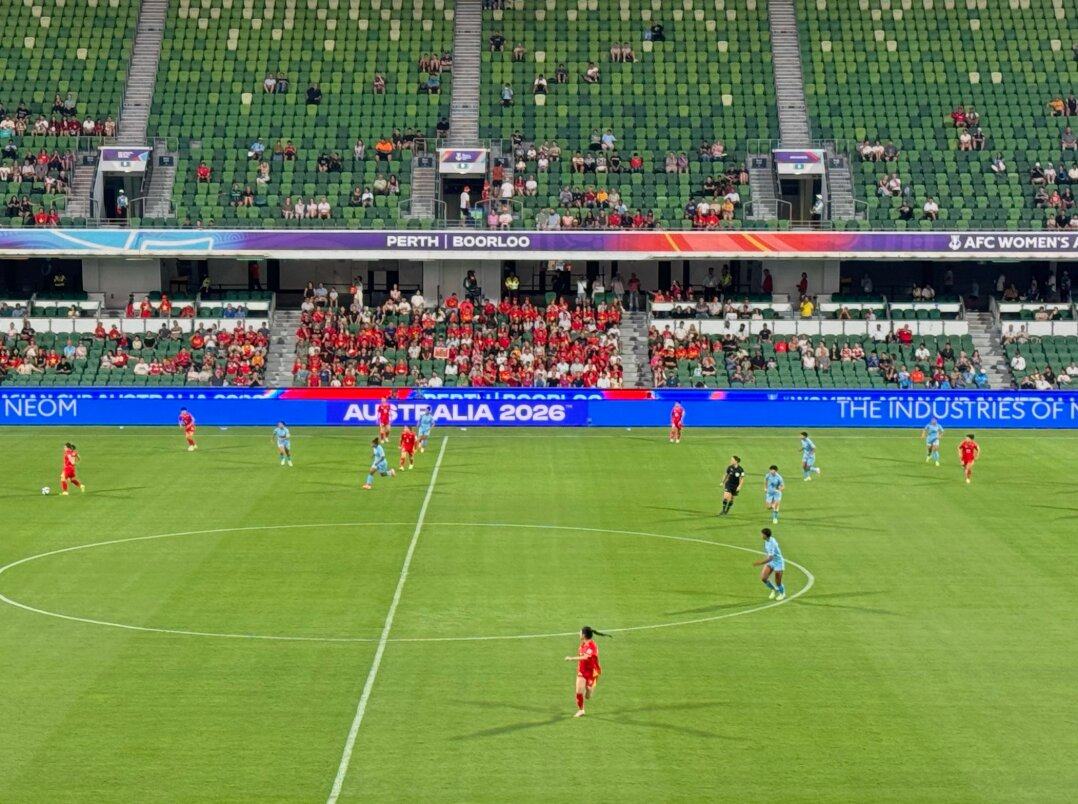
A moment from India vs Vietnam 2026 AFC Women's Asian Cup group match at the stadium.

Perth hosted 10 games at the 2026 AFC Women's Asian Cup. 8 matches, including 2 quarter-final matches was held at the Rectangular Stadium, with the opening game and one semi-final was held at Perth Stadium.

Game	Date	Team	Result	Team	Attendance
1	4 March 2026	Japan	2–0	Chinese Taipei	1,223
2	4 March 2026	Vietnam	2–1	India	1,961
3	7 March 2026	Chinese Taipei	1–0	Vietnam	1,784
4	7 March 2026	India	0–11	Japan	3,233
5	9 March 2026	Bangladesh	0–4	Uzbekistan	1,117
6	10 March 2026	Japan	4–0	Vietnam	3,648
7	13 March 2026	Australia	2–1	North Korea	16,466
8	14 March 2026	China	2–0 (a.e.t.)	Chinese Taipei	5,238

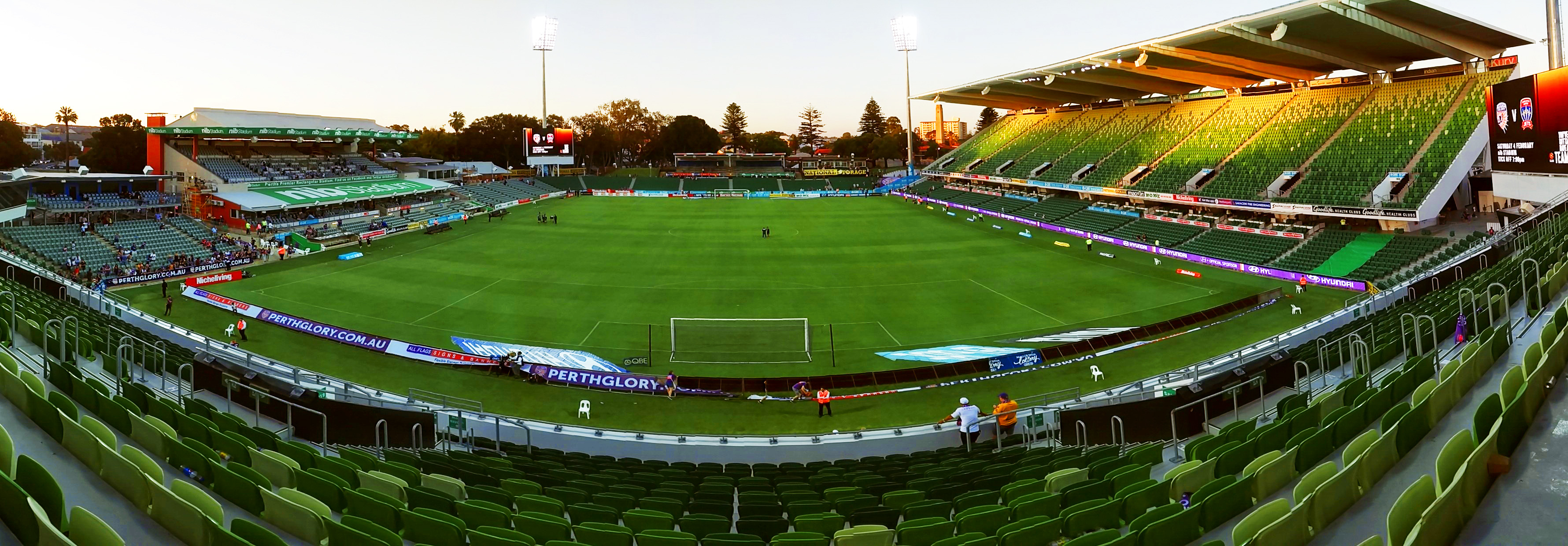
Perth Rectangular Stadium panorama following a Perth Glory match, January 2017

=== Australian rules football ===
==== WAFL ====
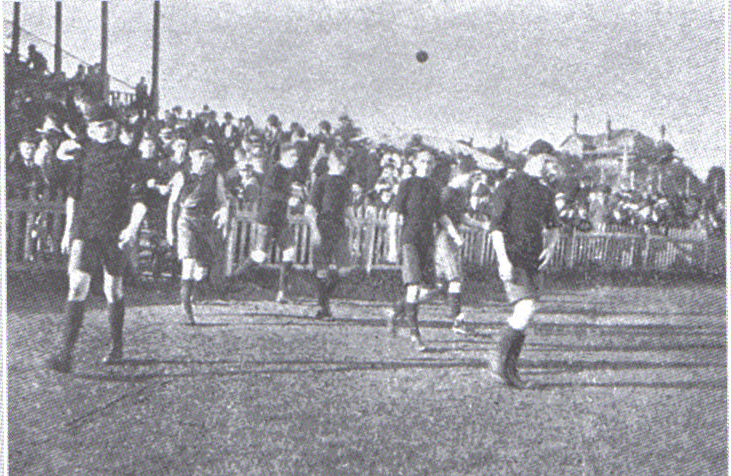
Christian Brothers College players walking onto Perth Oval in 1919

Australian rules football club East Perth Football Club moved to Perth Oval from Wellington Square in 1910, and played at the ground until 1999 except in 1940 due to a dispute with the Perth City Council over rents, and in 1988 and 1989 when the WAFL attempted an unsuccessful move to the WACA. After the Royals played their last match at the ground, they permanently moved away in 2003.

In 1956 the F.D. Book Stand was built as part of East Perth Football Club's golden jubilee celebrations. It was named after administrator Fred Book, who was instrumental in ensuring Perth Oval stayed as a sporting ground during World War II.

Six West Australian Football League Grand Finals were played at Perth Oval, the first being in 1912 and the last in 1935. The ground was also briefly used as a home base for East Perth's WAFL rivals West Perth and Perth at various points.

==== Interstate football ====
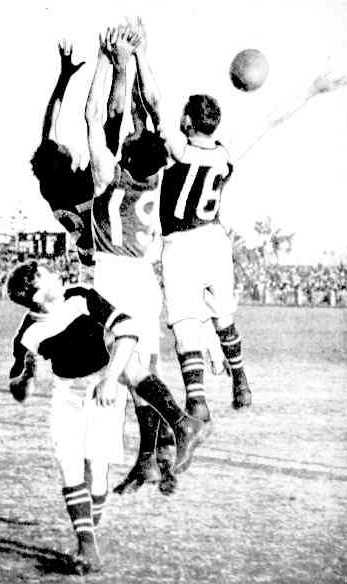
South Australia vs Western Australia during the 1921 Perth Carnival set a new record crowd of 26,461.

Eleven interstate matches were played at Perth Oval between 1921 and 1935, when it was succeeded by Subiaco Oval as the primary venue for interstate football. The de facto final of the 1921 Perth Carnival was played at Perth Oval between Western Australia and South Australia, with Western Australia winning by 10 points to emerge as interstate carnival champions for the first time. The match attracted 26,461 people, a Western Australian sporting record attendance.

In July 1929, Perth Oval hosted four interstate matches as part of the centenary of Western Australia celebrations. The first of these, featuring Western Australia and Victoria, set a new state record sporting crowd of 27,473 attendees, the largest sporting crowd ever at the venue. This remained a state record until the 1937 Perth Carnival.

=== Cricket ===
The venue was home to Western Australian Grade Cricket teams North Perth and University. North Perth played at the oval between 1910 and 1975 and University between 1913 and 1929.

=== Rugby union ===
Rugby was played at the venue as early as 1905. The ground has occasionally been used by the Western Australian Rugby Union to host state league finals matches at least as far back as 1940.

The Perth Spirit hosted at the venue during the 2007 Australian Rugby Championship (ARC), and has been the home ground of the Western Force in the Super Rugby since the 2010 season.

In July 2015, the first rugby union Test match was announced to take place at the venue in Australia's 2016 Rugby Championship campaign. The match was scheduled against Argentina, with a 2017 Test also confirmed to take place at the venue against South Africa.

After an almost ten year absence, Australia confirmed they would return to Perth Rectangular Stadium for a Test match in the inaugural Nations Championship tournament against Italy.

List of rugby union Test matches at Perth Rectangular Stadium
Date	Home	Score	Away	Attendance	Competition	Refs
17 September 2016	Australia	36–20	Argentina	16,202	2016 Rugby Championship	
9 September 2017	Australia	23–23	South Africa	17,528	2017 Rugby Championship	
18 July 2026	Australia	57–10	Italy	19,268	2026 Nations Championship	

=== Rugby league ===
Rugby league has been an annual fixture at Perth Rectangular Stadium since 2009, with South Sydney Rabbitohs hosting a home game once a season until 2017 with the Manly-Warringah Sea Eagles joining them for 2016 and 2017. The biggest crowds have occurred in games involving the New Zealand Warriors. It was announced in January 2016 that the stadium would host Perth's first rugby league test match between the Australian Kangaroos and the New Zealand Kiwis on 15 October 2016.

The venue hosted the 2017 Rugby League World Cup, the 2020 NRL Nines and the 2026 Rugby League World Cup.

From 2027, the Perth Bears will use the stadium as its primary home ground.

List of rugby league test matches played at Perth Rectangular Stadium.

Game	Date	Team	Result	Team	Attendance	Part of
1	15 October 2016	Australia	26–6	New Zealand	20,283	2016 Four Nations warm-up
2	12 November 2017	England	36–6	France	14,744	2017 World Cup Group A
3	12 November 2017	Wales	6–34	Ireland	14,744	2017 World Cup Group C
4	17 October 2026	England	70–6	Wales	7,188	2026 Women's Rugby League World Cup
5	17 October 2026	England	12–30	Tonga	18,302	2026 Men's Rugby League World Cup Pools B & C
6	24 October 2026	England	82–0	France	10,723	2026 Men's Rugby League World Cup Pools B & C
7	24 October 2026	Australia	78–0	England	13,087	2026 Women's Rugby League World Cup

The first game played at the venue was in the 1997 Super League season. The Perth-based Western Reds moved their round 4 game against the Canterbury Bulldogs to the oval due to the unavailability of their usual home ground, the WACA. On that occasion the Reds won 36–6 in what was the venue's smallest rugby league attendance (until 2017) of 7,135.

==== NRL games ====
Game	Date	Team	Result	Team	Attendance	Part of
1	23 March 1997	Western Reds	36–6	Canterbury Bulldogs	7,135	1997 Super League season
2	7 May 2005	Cronulla-Sutherland Sharks	28–24	New Zealand Warriors	13,293	2005 NRL season
3	13 June 2009	Melbourne Storm	28–22	South Sydney Rabbitohs	15,197	2009 NRL season
4	26 June 2010	South Sydney Rabbitohs	16–14	Melbourne Storm	13,164	2010 NRL season
5	24 June 2011	South Sydney Rabbitohs	16–12	Brisbane Broncos	15,371	2011 NRL season
6	23 March 2012	Brisbane Broncos	20–12	South Sydney Rabbitohs	15,599	2012 NRL season
7	7 July 2013	South Sydney Rabbitohs	30–13	New Zealand Warriors	20,221	2013 NRL season
8	29 March 2014	Canterbury-Bankstown Bulldogs	40–12	Melbourne Storm	12,014	2014 NRL season
9	7 June 2014	South Sydney Rabbitohs	34–18	New Zealand Warriors	20,267	2014 NRL season
10	6 June 2015	South Sydney Rabbitohs	36–4	New Zealand Warriors	20,272	2015 NRL season
11	5 June 2016	Gold Coast Titans	29–28	South Sydney Rabbitohs	13,142	2016 NRL season
12	16 July 2016	Manly-Warringah Sea Eagles (GP)	15–14	New Zealand Warriors	11,109	2016 NRL season
13	21 May 2017	Melbourne Storm	14–6	South Sydney Rabbitohs	11,433	2017 NRL season
14	1 July 2017	Manly-Warringah Sea Eagles	26–22	New Zealand Warriors	6,258	2017 NRL season
15	2 August 2024	Sydney Roosters	40–34	Dolphins	20,027	2024 NRL season

=== Record attendances ===
The record crowd for the ground is 32,000 for the Ed Sheeran concert on 2 December 2015, overtaking the previous record of just under 32,000 for the Foo Fighters concert earlier that year.

The record sport attendance is 27,473, for an interstate Australian football match between Western Australia and Victoria on 6 July 1929 – which was at the time the record football crowd in Western Australian history. The highest crowd for a club match was 26,760 for the 31 May 1969 derby Australian football match between East Perth and West Perth.

The record soccer crowd for a match at the ground is 19,495, for a 2018 FIFA World Cup qualifier between the Socceroos and Bangladesh, bettering the previous record of 18,067 in the 1998–99 NSL season game between Perth Glory and South Melbourne FC.

The record rugby union crowd at the venue prior to the 2012–13 redevelopment is an estimated 22,000 in a Super Rugby 2011 Season game between the Western Force and Crusaders on 30 April 2011.

The record sports crowd at the venue since the 2012–13 redevelopment is 20,727 in a 2015 NRL season game between the South Sydney Rabbitohs and New Zealand Warriors on 6 June 2015.

== Music ==
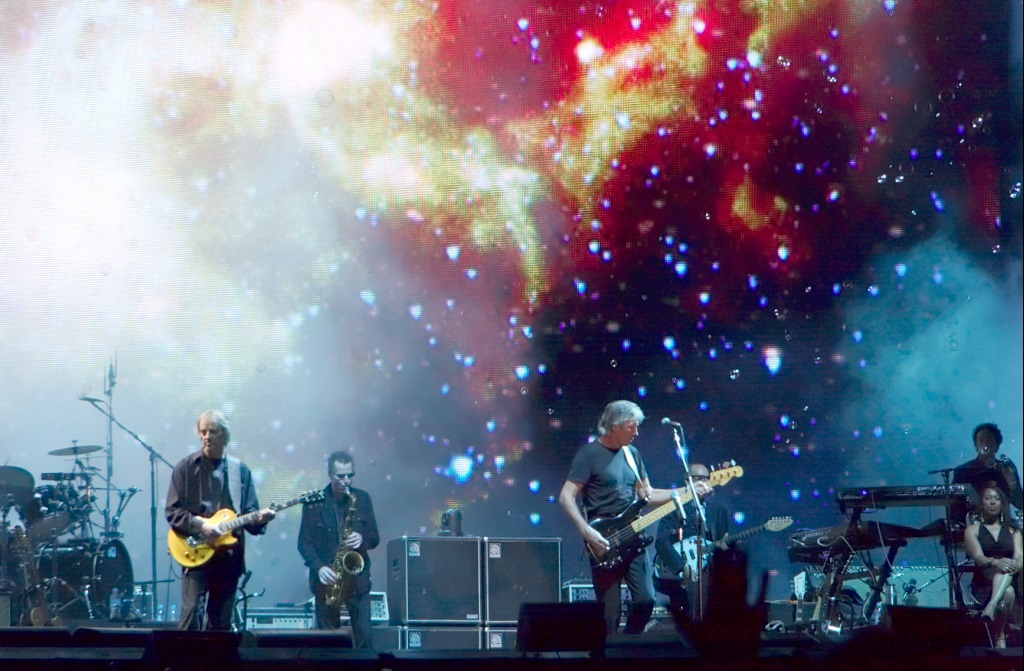
Roger Waters performing on his Dark Side Of The Moon Live tour in 2007

Perth Rectangular Stadium has been the venue of major music concerts, including:

Concerts
Year	Date	Artist/s
2005	15 February	Tom Jones and John Farnham
2005	19 February	Moonlight Music and Wine Festival
2005	29 October	Luciano Pavarotti
2007	9 February	Roger Waters
2007	11 February	Eric Clapton
2008	1 February	The Police
2008	2 February	The Police
2008	5 March	Rod Stewart
2008	29 March	Jack Johnson
2008	8 April	Celine Dion
2008	10 May	Elton John
2008	31 October	Def Leppard
2008	1 November	Eros Ramazzotti
2008	23 November	Billy Joel
2009	4 April	The Who
2009	14 November	Pearl Jam
2009	11 December	Fleetwood Mac
2009	12 December	Fleetwood Mac
2010	25 January	Raggamuffin
2010	18 April	Supafest
2010	24 November	Leonard Cohen
2010	4 December	Jack Johnson
2010	10 December	Eagles
2011	29 March	Neil Diamond
2011	6 April	Lionel Richie
2011	15 October	Def Leppard
2011	22 October	Meat Loaf
2011	19 November	Kings of Leon
2011	28 November	Foo Fighters
2012	4 February	Rod Stewart
2013	11 December	Taylor Swift
2015	8 March	Foo Fighters
2015	2 December	Ed Sheeran
2016	20 November	RNB Fridays Live
2017	6 March	Justin Bieber
2017	14 October	RNB Fridays Live
2017	2 December	Paul McCartney
2018	20 January	Foo Fighters
2018	9 November	RNB Fridays Live
2019	5 March	Red Hot Chili Peppers
2019	8 November	RNB Fridays Live
2019	30 November	Elton John
2019	1 December	Elton John
2022	5 November	Fridayz Live
2023	20 February	Harry Styles
2023	29 November	Foo Fighters

Additionally, in September 2020 Tame Impala performed on the pitch in the empty park amid the COVID-19 pandemic in promotion of EA Sports FIFA 21.

== See also ==
- List of soccer stadiums in Australia
- Lists of stadiums
