= Movable seating =

Feature of facilities like stadiums

Movable seating is a feature of some facilities like stadiums, often known as convertible stadiums, or moduable stadiums. It allows for the movement of parts of the grandstand to allow for a change of the playing surface shape. This allows games that use various shaped playing surfaces such as an oval field, for cricket and/or Australian rules football; or a rectangular field, for football (soccer), rugby league, rugby union, American football, and/or Canadian football; or a diamond field, for baseball; to be played in the same stadium. This is particularly useful in Australia and the United States, where various professional sports with varying field configurations are popular spectator pastimes. The process of conversion from one form to another is time consuming, depending on the stadium it can take from 8 to 80 hours. Many stadiums were built in the United States in the 1960s and 1970s to host both baseball and American football.

== Stadiums with movable seating ==
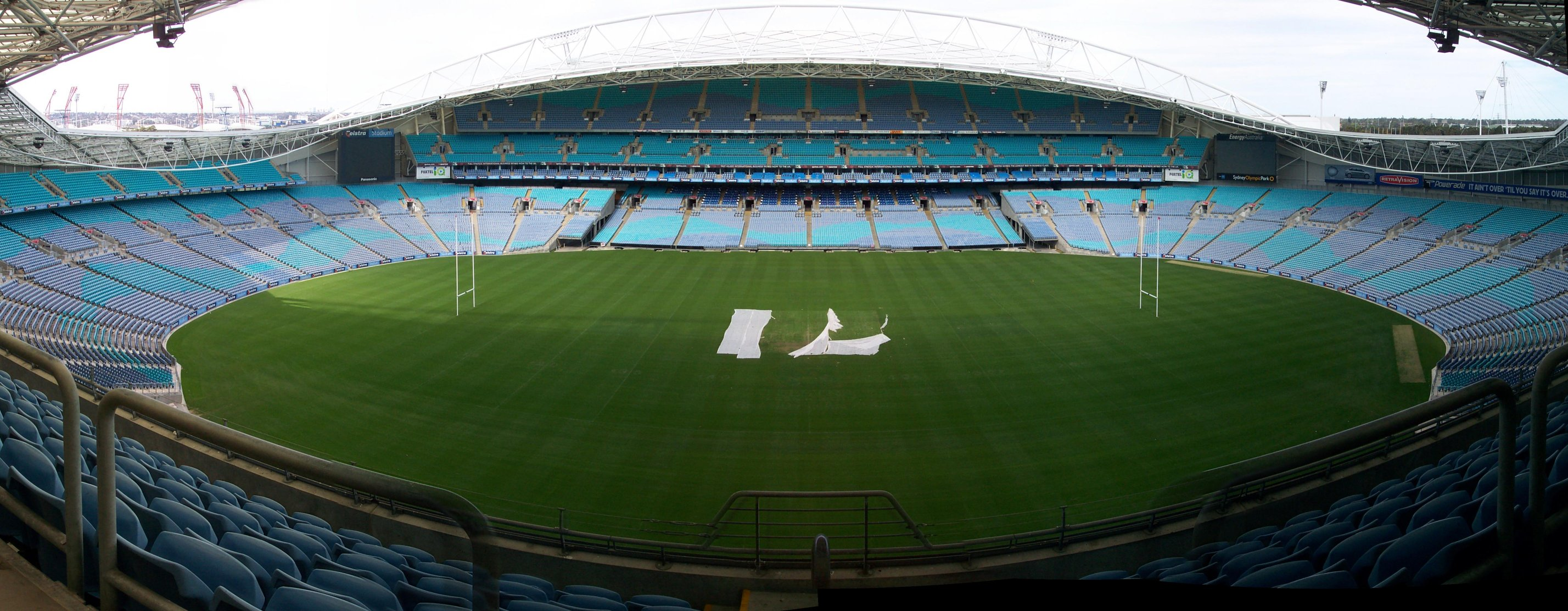
Stadium Australia showing a configuration of seating in progress

=== Asia ===
- Saitama Super Arena in Saitama City, Saitama, Japan, has separate layouts for arena-style seating for basketball and hockey and stadium-style seating for soccer, American football, and concerts. This is made possible by a large movable block.

=== Europe ===
- Allianz Park, the stadium that is the most notable structure within the Barnet Copthall leisure complex in London, England, United Kingdom, has movable seating that was installed for the benefit of its primary tenant, the Saracens rugby union club, in a renovation that was completed in early 2013. The movable stands allow the stadium to continue to serve in its original role as an athletics (track and field) venue.
- London Stadium, formerly known as Olympic Stadium in London, England, United Kingdom, was originally built for the 2012 Summer Olympics with fixed seating, but movable sections were added to provide optimal configurations for its original purpose of athletics, association football and concerts. West Ham United F.C. moved into the reconfigured venue starting in the 2016–17 season.
- Paris La Défense Arena, located near the La Défense business district in the Paris suburb of Nanterre, opened in October 2017 after many delays. The stadium features a movable seating block that allows it to accommodate field or court sports.
- Stade de France in the Paris suburb of Saint-Denis, France was built for the 1998 FIFA World Cup. It has a movable stand which covers an athletics track.

=== North America ===
- Aloha Stadium in Honolulu, Hawaii, United States, opened in 1975, and has four movable sections allowing it to be reconfigured for baseball, American football, soccer, or concerts. However, the stadium managers permanently locked the stands in the football configuration effective in 2007, citing maintenance costs for the equipment used to move the sections.
- BC Place in Vancouver, British Columbia, has movable sections that can configured for Canadian football and soccer or baseball.
- Caesars Superdome originally been designed to accommodate baseball. The sideline seats used for football could be pulled backwards, to widen the field. The Minor League New Orleans Pelicans played one year there (1977), and several Major League teams played exhibition games. However, it was not ideal for baseball: some upper-deck seats did not get a full view of the field. Major League Baseball never considered New Orleans seriously as an expansion site. After Hurricane Katrina, when the Superdome was renovated, the movable seats were replaced with permanent seating. It is thus no longer capable of accommodating baseball.
- Hard Rock Stadium in Miami Gardens, Florida, United States, home of the Miami Dolphins (National Football League) and Miami Hurricanes (NCAA football), originally had a movable stand used to accommodate the Florida Marlins. The Marlins opened LoanDepot Park in 2012, following which the movable stand was permanently locked into a football-only configuration. This stand was later demolished in a 2015 reconstruction of the stadium's lower bowl.
- Olympic Stadium in Montreal, Quebec, Canada, has two movable sections allowing it to be reconfigured for baseball, Canadian football, soccer and concerts.
- Mercedes-Benz Stadium in Atlanta, Georgia, United States, home to the NFL's Atlanta Falcons and Major League Soccer's Atlanta United since August 2017, has retractable lower-bowl seats along the sidelines. This allows an appropriate playing area for soccer, whose regulation field is nearly 20 meters wider than that of American football.
- RingCentral Coliseum in Oakland, California, United States, has been the home venue for the NFL’s Oakland Raiders and baseball’s Oakland Athletics for most of its existence, and thus has movable seating. However, the Raiders relocated to Las Vegas after the 2019 season, leaving baseball as the only sport regularly played at the Coliseum.
- Robert F. Kennedy Memorial Stadium in Washington, D.C., United States, used movable seating to accommodate two different pairs of teams:
  - Starting in 1962, the year after the stadium opened, the NFL's Washington Commanders and the second incarnation of the Washington Senators shared the stadium until the Senators moved to the Dallas–Fort Worth Metroplex in 1971. During this time, several different soccer teams also used RFK in its (American) football configuration.
  - The MLB Washington Nationals and D.C. United (Major League Soccer) shared the stadium from 2005 until 2008, when the Nationals moved to a new ballpark.
- Rogers Centre in Toronto, Ontario, Canada, has separate layouts for the Toronto Blue Jays (American League) and the Toronto Argonauts (Canadian Football League). For several years in the 21st century, the Buffalo Bills (NFL) played one regular-season home game there each year, using the CFL seating configuration and an NFL-regulation field. The Argonauts moved to an expanded and renovated BMO Field in 2016, after which the movable seating was permanently locked into its baseball configuration.
- U.S. Bank Stadium in Minneapolis, Minnesota, United States, which opened in 2016 as the new home of the Minnesota Vikings (National Football League), is purposed for football but is able to convert to baseball for the University of Minnesota men's baseball team.

=== Oceania ===
- Stadium Australia (Accor Stadium) was the Olympic Stadium at the Sydney 2000 Summer Olympics in Australia. Post-Olympics during 2001–2003, it was re-configured and movable seating was implemented allowing the stadium to transition between a rectangular or an oval playing surface.
- Marvel Stadium (Docklands Stadium) in Melbourne, Victoria, Australia, was completed in 1999. Features such as movable seating and a retractable roof allow for the venue to host many sports and entertainment events. It is also the first stadium in Australia to have this feature.
- Optus Stadium in Perth, Australia, a venue built with an oval pitch for cricket and Australian rules football, has several "drop-in" movable seating areas positioned to "fill in" much of the sides of the pitch when the venue is used for rectangular-field sports.

== Proposed stadiums with movable seating ==
- The Australian Capital Territory's minister for sport has proposed a 'super stadium' with removable seating as a replacement for the ageing Canberra Stadium.
- In 1964, a stadium complex was proposed in San Diego by Barron Hilton in which grandstands would float on water between football and baseball fields. The enormous price tag ensured the complex was never built.

== Former stadiums with movable seating ==
- The Hubert H. Humphrey Metrodome in Minneapolis, Minnesota, United States, featured movable seating, with layouts for baseball and football. Before its 2014 demolition, it was home to the Minnesota Vikings (NFL), served as a part-time home for the Minnesota Golden Gophers college baseball team (representing the University of Minnesota), and was also used for other college baseball games. It had also been home to the Minnesota Twins (American League) and the university's football program, but the Twins moved into their new Target Field in April 2010 and the Gophers football team opened their new TCF Bank Stadium in September 2009. The Metrodome also hosted NBA and college basketball games as well as soccer events. The Metrodome was replaced on-site by U.S. Bank Stadium, a stadium which also features movable seating.
- Mile High Stadium in Denver, Colorado, United States, added a large movable stand in a 1977 expansion project. A hydraulic process allowed the stadium to change from a football to a baseball configuration in about two hours. The longtime home of the NFL's Denver Broncos and minor league baseball's Denver Bears/Zephyrs, it became the original home of baseball's Colorado Rockies in 1993. The Rockies drew all-time MLB record crowds in their first two seasons before leaving Mile High for their new Coors Field in 1995. Mile High was torn down after its football-only replacement, currently known as Empower Field at Mile High, was opened in 2001.
- Shea Stadium in New York City was built to function as both a football and baseball stadium. The New York Mets called Shea Stadium home from 1964 until 2008. The New York Jets played there from 1964 until 1983. Field level seats were arranged in two crescent shaped sections that could be moved on below-ground rails. In the football configuration these sections faced each other from opposite sides of the playing field. For baseball, the sections were rotated so that they would come close to meeting in the territory behind home plate. One section would be along the first base side foul line while the other was on the third base side. One consequence of the movable sections was that in the baseball configuration the seats were a larger distance from the foul lines than in most baseball-only parks. The seats also directly faced the foul line regardless of where they were located. Fans seated beyond first or third base would have to turn to face the infield. Another problem was that moving the seats damaged the grass playing surface. Late season Mets games often had sections of dead grass in the corners of the outfield from when the seats were moved for Jets games. After the Jets moved to Giants Stadium in New Jersey following the 1983 NFL season, the seats were left in the baseball configuration. Seats were later added along the baselines, reducing the size of foul territory.
- Candlestick Park in San Francisco, California, was opened in 1960 as a baseball-only stadium for the San Francisco Giants. In 1971 the San Francisco 49ers football team moved in, which required the stadium to be significantly expanded and completely enclosed the previously open outfield with upper deck seating. For football, a large seating section covered the right field area which gave the stadium an unorthodox appearance. The Giants moved to the venue now known as Oracle Park after the 2000 season, and the stadium remained in its football configuration for the rest of its life. The 49ers moved to Levi's Stadium after the 2013 season, and demolition of Candlestick Park began in February 2015.
- San Diego Stadium (formerly Jack Murphy Stadium, Qualcomm Stadium, and SDCCU Stadium) in San Diego, California, United States, was formerly shared by the San Diego Padres of Major League Baseball, the San Diego Chargers of the National Football League, and the San Diego State Aztecs. The Padres moved to Petco Park in 2004, leaving football as the only major sport played in SDCCU Stadium. The Chargers moved to Los Angeles in 2017. The stadium was closed in March 2020 and demolished in 2021.
