= Carnival II World Tour =

2026 concert tour by Jay Chou

The Carnival II World Tour
- Tour by Jay Chou
- Official Carnival II World Tour poster, Hangzhou
- Location: Asia; Australia
- Associated album: Children of the Sun
- Start date: April 3, 2026
- No. of shows: 23

Jay Chou concert chronology
- The Carnival World Tour (2019–2025); The Carnival II World Tour (2026–)

The Carnival II World Tour (Chinese: 嘉年華II世界巡迴演唱會) is the ongoing ninth concert tour by Taiwanese recording artist Jay Chou. The tour began in Hangzhou at the Hangzhou Olympic Sports Centre Stadium on April 3, 2026. As of June 2026, 18 shows have been announced.

This tour's concept is "One City, One Theme." Each city will have its own exclusive concert title and thematic design named after Chou's songs.

== Production ==
Featuring a 14-meter-tall mecha and a 28 backup dancers, the estimated production cost exceeds NT$500 million (approximately USD$15.8 million).

== Set list ==
This set list was taken from the show in Hangzhou on April 3, 2026. It does not represent all shows throughout the tour.

- Children of the Sun
- Incomparable
- Big Ben + Pink Ocean
- Simple Love
- You Hear Me

Transition: Extreme Racing Circuit

- Drifting
- Who Cares
- The Day It Rained

Transition: Heartfelt VCR with Piano (Snail by Cao Yang)

- Black Humor
- Sunny Day
- The Promised Love

Transition: Special Guests Performance (Legendary by Alan Kuo, Cao Yang, Gary Yang)

- Hair Like Snow
- The Girl from Hunan
- Fade Away
- Dragon Fist + Nunchucks
- In the Name of Father
- Nocturne

Transition: Guess the Song

- Rosemary + Mojito
- I Do
- My Daughter, Your Highness
- Rice Field (rock version)

Transition: Band + Dancer Solo

- Class 3-2
- Love Confession

Transition: Special Guest Performance (Love is Extraordinary by Will Liu)

- Song requests (performed with Will Liu, Alan Kuo, Cao Yang, and Gary Yang):
  - A Dandelion's Promise
  - Aegean Sea
  - Step Aside
  - Floral Sea
  - Say Goodbye
  - Rain All Night
  - Grandpa's Tea
- Waiting for You

== Tour dates ==
List of concert dates
Date	City	Country	Venue	Theme	Attendance
April 3, 2026	Hangzhou	China	Hangzhou Olympic Sports Centre Stadium	Fireworks (烟花)	150,000
April 4, 2026	Hangzhou	China	Hangzhou Olympic Sports Centre Stadium	Fireworks (烟花)	150,000
April 5, 2026	Hangzhou	China	Hangzhou Olympic Sports Centre Stadium	Fireworks (烟花)	150,000
April 17, 2026	Nanning	China	Guangxi Sports Center	Sweet (甜甜的)	149,300
April 18, 2026	Nanning	China	Guangxi Sports Center	Sweet (甜甜的)	149,300
April 19, 2026	Nanning	China	Guangxi Sports Center	Sweet (甜甜的)	149,300
May 15, 2026	Wenzhou	China	Wenzhou Olympic Sports Center Stadium	Snail (蜗牛)	120,000
May 16, 2026	Wenzhou	China	Wenzhou Olympic Sports Center Stadium	Snail (蜗牛)	120,000
May 17, 2026	Wenzhou	China	Wenzhou Olympic Sports Center Stadium	Snail (蜗牛)	120,000
June 26, 2026	Beijing	China	Beijing National Stadium	Dragon Fist (龙拳)	195,000
June 27, 2026	Beijing	China	Beijing National Stadium	Dragon Fist (龙拳)	195,000
June 28, 2026	Beijing	China	Beijing National Stadium	Dragon Fist (龙拳)	195,000
October 17, 2026	Melbourne	Australia	Marvel Stadium	Pink (粉色)	—
November 21, 2026	Sydney	Australia	ENGIE Stadium	Ocean (海洋)	—
December 4, 2026	Guangzhou	China	Tianhe Sports Center Stadium	Time Machine (時光機)	—
December 5, 2026	Guangzhou	China	Tianhe Sports Center Stadium	Time Machine (時光機)	—
December 6, 2026	Guangzhou	China	Tianhe Sports Center Stadium	Time Machine (時光機)	—
December 18, 2026	Sanya	China	Sanya Sports Center Egret Stadium	Sunlight (陽光)	—
December 19, 2026	Sanya	China	Sanya Sports Center Egret Stadium	Sunlight (陽光)	—
December 20, 2026	Sanya	China	Sanya Sports Center Egret Stadium	Sunlight (陽光)	—
January 8, 2027	Singapore		National Stadium, Singapore	Sunny Day (晴天)	—
January 9, 2027	Singapore		National Stadium, Singapore	Sunny Day (晴天)	—
January 10, 2027	Singapore		National Stadium, Singapore	Sunny Day (晴天)	—
January 23, 2027	Kuala Lumpur	Malaysia	Bukit Jalil National Stadium	Rice Field (稻香）	—
March 26, 2027	Fuzhou	China	Fuzhou Strait Olympic Sports Center Stadium	Happiness(幸福）	—
March 27, 2027	Fuzhou	China	Fuzhou Strait Olympic Sports Center Stadium	Happiness(幸福）	—
March 28, 2027	Fuzhou	China	Fuzhou Strait Olympic Sports Center Stadium	Happiness(幸福）	—
April 9, 2027	Wuhan	China	Wuhan Sports Center Main Stadium	Preface to the Orchid Pavilion (蘭亭序）	—
April 10, 2027	Wuhan	China	Wuhan Sports Center Main Stadium	Preface to the Orchid Pavilion (蘭亭序）	—
April 11, 2027	Wuhan	China	Wuhan Sports Center Main Stadium	Preface to the Orchid Pavilion (蘭亭序）	—
Total					N/A
