= Fridayz Live =

Australian annual concert series

- Genre: Hip-hop, R&B, pop
- Dates: October/November
- Years active: 2016–2023, 2025–present
- Founders: Hit Radio Network; Frontier Touring
- Website: fridayz.live

Fridayz Live (formerly known as RNB Fridays Live) is an annual concert series held in Australia. The series was co-founded by the Hit Radio Network and Frontier Touring in 2016. The event features several stages featuring musical artists from many genres of music, including R&B, hip hop, electronic dance music, and pop. The concert series are held in venues across major cities in Australia. The shows are hosted by late Fatman Scoop, with DJ Horizon as the resident DJ.

== Concert series by year ==
Year	Headliner(s)	Featured act(s)	Dates
2016	Nelly; TLC	Montell Jordan; Blu Cantrell; Dante Thomas; Kevin Lyttle; DJ Horizon; Mýa; 112; Blackstreet	18 November: Qudos Bank Arena, Sydney; 19 November: Eatons Hill Outdoors, Brisbane; 20 November: The Gates at nib Stadium, Perth; 22 November: Titanium Security Arena, Adelaide; 25 November: Hisense Arena, Melbourne
2017	Craig David; Sean Paul; Ne-Yo; Kelly Rowland	Kelis; En Vogue; Mario; Christina Milian; Monifah; Ruff Endz	12 October: Qudos Bank Arena, Sydney; 13 October: Qudos Bank Arena, Sydney; 14 October: nib Stadium, Perth; 15 October: Adelaide Entertainment Centre, Adelaide; 19 October: Hisense Arena, Melbourne; 20 October: Hisense Arena, Melbourne; 21 October: Brisbane Showgrounds, Brisbane
2018	Usher; Salt-n-Pepa; Trey Songz	Taio Cruz; Lil Jon; Eve; Naughty by Nature; Ginuwine; Estelle; Next; Yo! Mafia	9 November: nib Stadium, Perth; 10 November: Marvel Stadium, Melbourne; 11 November: Adelaide Showground, Adelaide; 16 November: Brisbane Showgrounds, Brisbane; 17 November: Spotless Stadium, Sydney
2019	Janet Jackson; Black Eyed Peas; 50 Cent	Jason Derulo; Brandy; Keri Hilson; Sisqo; J-Kwon; Horizon; Yo! Mafia	8 November: HBF Park, Perth; 9 November: Marvel Stadium, Melbourne; 10 November: Adelaide Showground, Adelaide; 15 November: Brisbane Showgrounds, Brisbane; 16 November: Giants Stadium, Sydney
2022	Macklemore; TLC; Akon; Craig David (Melbourne, Perth and Adelaide)^{[A]}; Jeremih (Brisbane and Sydney)^{[A]}	Ashanti; Shaggy; Jay Sean; Dru Hill; Lumidee; Havana Brown; Yo! Mafia	4 November: Rod Laver Arena, Melbourne; 5 November: HBF Park, Perth; 6 November: Entertainment Centre, Adelaide; 11 November: Showgrounds, Brisbane; 12 November: Giants Stadium, Sydney
2023	Jason Derulo; Flo Rida; Kelly Rowland	Boyz II Men; JoJo; 112; Baby Bash; Travie McCoy; Havana Brown; Vinn Rock; Kay Gee; Yo! Mafia	10 November: Rod Laver Arena, Melbourne; 11 November: RAC Arena, Perth; 12 November: AEC Arena, Adelaide; 16 November: Spark Arena, Auckland; 17 November: Brisbane Showgrounds, Brisbane; 18 November: Giants Stadium, Sydney
2025	Mariah Carey; Pitbull	Wiz Khalifa; Lil Jon; Eve; Tinie Tempah; Jordin Sparks	17 October: Brisbane Showgrounds, Brisbane; 18 October: ENGIE Stadium, Sydney; 24 October: Langley Park, Perth; 25 October: Marvel Stadium, Melbourne

Notes

- A Craig David pulled out of Brisbane and Sydney for undisclosed reasons one month prior. Jeremih was announced as the replacement at the same time.

== Box office score data ==
Venue	City	Tickets sold / Available	Gross revenue
2016
Qudos Bank Arena	Sydney	14,450 / 14,450 (100%)	$1,025,490
2017
Qudos Bank Arena	Sydney	21,770 / 25,554 (85%)	$2,096,200
2018
nib Stadium	Perth	23,029 / 25,000 (92%)	$2,204,360
Marvel Stadium	Melbourne	51,104 / 53,036 (96%)	$4,730,440
Adelaide Showgrounds	Adelaide	14,297 / 17,785 (80%)	$1,429,980
Brisbane Showgrounds	Brisbane	33,189 / 33,232 (~100%)	$3,583,000
Spotless Stadium	Sydney	42,013 / 42,013 (100%)	$4,191,310
2019
HBF Park	Perth	17,278 / 29,313 (59%)	$1,756,360
Marvel Stadium	Melbourne	23,205 / 40,956 (57%)	$2,252,470
Brisbane Showgrounds	Brisbane	30,695 / 36,050 (85%)	$3,235,850
Giants Stadium	Sydney	27,334 / 30,247 (90%)	$2,812,120
TOTAL		298,364 / 347,636 (95%)	$29,317,580
