= Docklands Stadium =

Stadium in Melbourne, Victoria, Australia

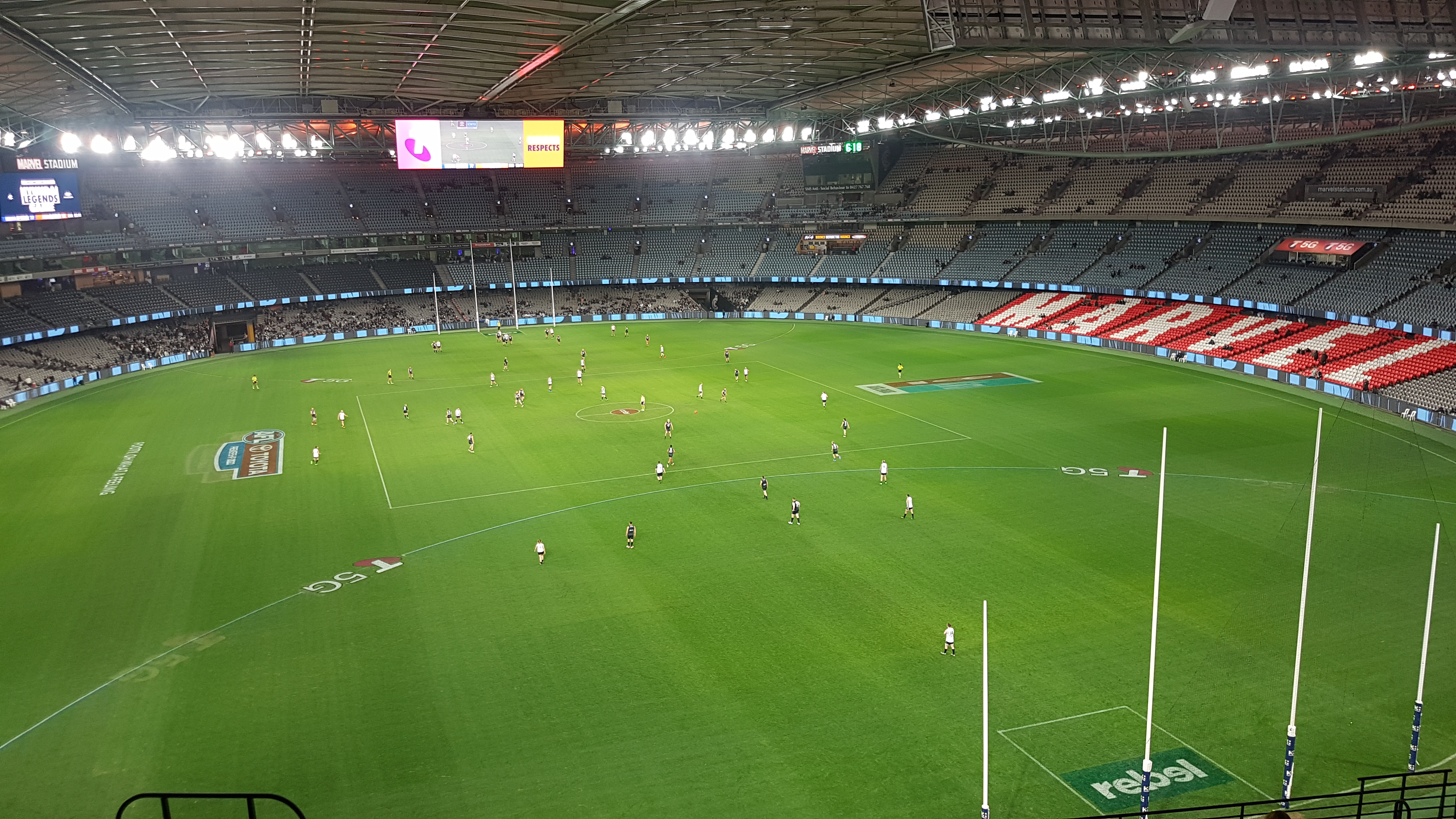
- Docklands Stadium in July 2022
- Interactive map of Docklands Stadium
- Former names: Colonial Stadium (2000–2002); Telstra Dome (2002–2009); Etihad Stadium (2009–2018)
- Location: Harbour Esplanade, Docklands, Melbourne, Victoria, Australia
- Coordinates: 37°48′59″S 144°56′51″E
- Owner: Australian Football League
- Operator: Australian Football League (2020–present); Melbourne Stadiums Limited (2000–2020)
- Capacity: 56,347 (venue capacity); 53,343 (seating capacity); 47,000 (cricket and rectangular mode)
- Roof: Retractable
- Surface: Grass
- Record attendance: 76,150 (Adele, March 2017)
- Field size: 160 m × 129 m (525 ft × 423 ft)
- Public transit: Harbour Esplanade; Southern Cross; Docklands

Construction
- Groundbreaking: October 1997
- Opened: 9 March 2000
- Cost: A$460 million
- Architect: HOK Sport Venue Event in association with Daryl Jackson
- General contractor: Baulderstone Hornibrook

Tenants
- Australian Football League Essendon Football Club (2000–present); St Kilda Football Club (2000–present); Western Bulldogs (2000–present); North Melbourne Football Club (2000–present); Carlton Football Club (2005–present) Cricket Melbourne Renegades (BBL; 2011–2026) Other Melbourne Storm (NRL; 2001, Finals 2006–09, 2010, 2023); Melbourne Victory (A-League Men; 2006–2021); Australia men's national soccer team (selected matches); Australia women's national soccer team (selected matches); Australia national rugby union team (selected matches); Australia national rugby league team (selected matches)

Website
- marvelstadium.com.au

Ground information
- End names
- Lockett End; Coventry End

International information
- First men's ODI: 16 August 2000: Australia v South Africa
- Last men's ODI: 3 February 2006: Australia v South Africa
- As of 22 August 2015; Source: ESPNcricinfo

Docklands Stadium (known under naming rights as Marvel Stadium) is a stadium located in the Melbourne suburb of Docklands. It is primarily used for Australian rules football as the home ground of several teams in the Australian Football League (AFL).

The stadium was built at a cost of A$460 million and opened in 2000 as a replacement for Waverley Park. Offices at the precinct serve as the headquarters of the AFL, which had exclusive ownership of the venue since October 2016. The stadium features a retractable roof and the ground level seating can be converted from oval to rectangular configuration. The stadium hosts a total capacity of 56,347 spectators, being reduced to 47,000 when playing cricket and in rectangular mode. The Walt Disney Company subsidiary Marvel Comics have owned naming rights to the stadium since 2018.

The stadium has been used as a significant home ground for cricket, soccer, rugby union, and rugby league teams, including the Melbourne Renegades in the Big Bash League (BBL) from 2011 until 2026 and Melbourne Victory FC in the A-League from 2006 until 2021.

== History ==
=== Construction ===
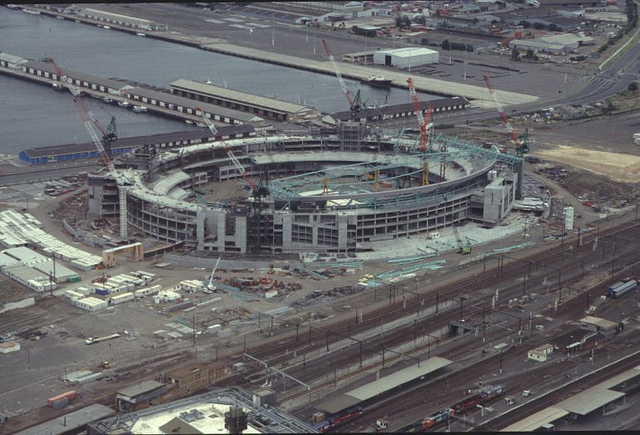
Docklands Stadium under construction in December 1998

Plans for the stadium were announced in October 1996 as a more centrally located replacement for the much larger but ageing Waverley Park as a headquarters for the Australian Football League. It was built in the Melbourne Docklands to the immediate west of the CBD, a central but largely deserted industrial area which had just begun its own urban renewal project. Construction of the stadium by Baulderstone began in October 1997 under the working name "Victoria Stadium", and was completed ahead of the 2000 AFL season. The stadium was originally developed by the Seven Network under chairman and major shareholder Kerry Stokes, in conjunction with junior partners in the Docklands Stadium Consortium. Following completion in 2000, the stadium was controlled by the Seven Network. The remaining leasehold interest in the stadium was sold to James Fielding Funds Management in June 2006 for A$330 million.

The stadium, like Waverley Park, was built primarily for Australian rules football, unlike most grounds of a similar size in Australia which were originally designed for cricket then later developed for football. It was the first Australian rules football stadium built with a retractable roof, which throughout its history has usually been closed for night matches and for wet weather day matches; the roof closure policy for dry weather day matches has varied. It was the first stadium in Australia to have movable seating. All four level-one tiers of the stadium can be moved up to 18 metres forward into a rectangular configuration. Despite this being a key feature of the stadium design, it has rarely been used, due to damage to turf, time to deploy the seats, and a reduced capacity, since the corner bays of the stadium become unavailable in rectangular configuration.

=== Development ===
Construction was finished only weeks before the first match, and some scheduled pre-season matches were relocated as a result. The first match to be played at the ground was between Essendon and Port Adelaide, before a crowd of 43,012, on 9 March 2000. Essendon won the match by 94 points, and Michael Long kicked the first goal at the ground. The game was to have been played under the closed roof, but due to technical issues it remained open. Six days later, Barbra Streisand staged the venue's first concert. The stadium's third football game, between Western Bulldogs and Brisbane Lions on 19 March, was the first to be played under the roof. On 16 August 2000, the world's first indoor One Day International was held at the venue between Australia and South Africa. The first game played in the rectangular configuration was a Melbourne Storm game in July 2001. The first soccer match played was in round 5 2001 of the National Soccer League between South Melbourne FC and Melbourne Knights FC.

From the beginning, the stadium's playing surface was criticized for its slipperiness, hardness and lack of grass coverage, and the increased risk of injury that this causes to players. Maintaining surface quality remains one of the stadium's biggest challenges. The stadium's orientation and highly built-up grandstands mean that the Northern end of the stadium in particular receives only 6 weeks of sunlight a year. Concerts held at the stadium are also usually placed at the Southern end due to the ability for grass to recover more quickly. The entire surface undergoes regular, expensive replacement during the season with turf grown externally, under contract by HG Turf, whereas the responsibility of laying and managing the turf lies with Docklands Stadium management. Since 2007, elaborate heating and lighting to better allow grass to be grown and managed within the stadium have been in use.

The venue was damaged by a thunderstorm in March 2010 during the 2010 Victorian storms. The external roof at Gate 2 caved in, causing damage and flooding inside the entertainment area. That evening's pre-season match between St Kilda and Fremantle was delayed due to WorkSafe inspections, but it still went ahead before a small crowd of 5,000.

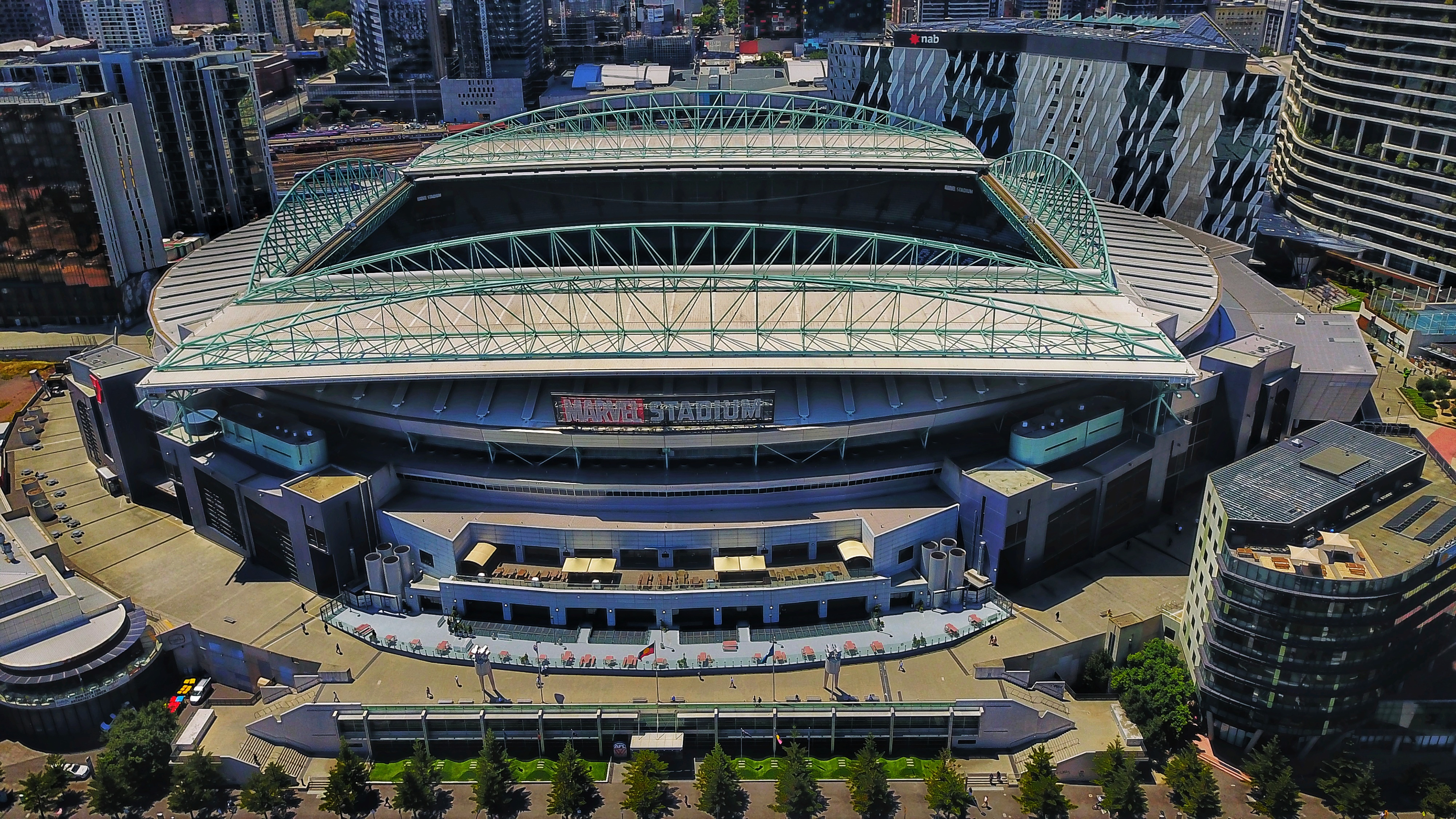
Marvel Stadium pictured from above (February 2019)

In 2015, LED electronic advertising was added around the perimeter of the ground on level 1 and 2, as well as a strip synthetic turf around the edge of the fence, outside the boundary line. The synthetic strip was narrowed after Brisbane Lions player Michael Close suffered a season ending ACL injury on the uneven surface during a game in 2015.

The stadium became unpopular with many of its tenant clubs, especially St Kilda, North Melbourne and Western Bulldogs, as high operating costs and the high proportion of gate revenues which were paid back to the stadium meant that clubs earned much lower returns for a game at Docklands than they would have earned from the same attendance at the Melbourne Cricket Ground. At least 20,000 spectators were usually required to break even on a game. Those three clubs all received compensation payments from the AFL to balance the weak deals, and sold occasional home matches to small interstate or international venues for greater financial returns than they could earn at Docklands.

The stadium and broader precinct underwent a $225 million redevelopment, funded by the AFL and Victorian Government, between 2021 and 2024. This included two new video screens, which hang underneath the stadium's roof and were installed behind the goal at each end of the stadium ahead of the 2022 AFL season. The rest of the redevelopment upgraded stadium infrastructure, connected the precinct to the Melbourne CBD and opened up access to the Docklands waterfront. The redevelopment was completed in March 2024.

In May 2023, Docklands Stadium opened The Runner, becoming the first venue in the Southern Hemisphere to utilize Amazon's Just Walk Out technology for checkout-free purchases. The Runner outlets, consisting of one bar and one food kiosk, work by having attendees scanning their credit or debit card, or mobile wallet payment option at the entry, entering to collect their items, and then leaving the outlet without having to wait in line to checkout. The outlets utilize cameras, sensors, machine learning algorithms, motion tracking and artificial intelligence like computer vision and deep learning techniques, including generative AI, to accurately determine who took what in any retail environment.

=== Ownership ===
Under the terms of the agreement governing construction and operation of the venue, in 2025 the AFL was to win ownership of the stadium for a nominal $30 fee; but the AFL Commission opted to purchase exclusive ownership of the stadium earlier than this, in October 2016, for approximately $200 million. This purchase left the stadium's tenant AFL clubs millions of dollars better off, as they and the AFL arranged more favorable tenancy agreements; although clubs continue to make more money at the Melbourne Cricket Ground, leading to a push from tenant clubs Carlton, Essendon and St Kilda to reduce their annual matches at the ground. The stadium was eventually integrated into the AFL structure several years later, ending the independent management of the venue by Melbourne Stadiums Limited.

The purchase also soon proved critically important to the AFL's finances during the COVID-19 pandemic, when it was able to leverage its ownership of the stadium in obtaining a $500–600 million line of credit to cover cash flow shortages when the 2020 AFL season was suspended.

== Naming rights history ==
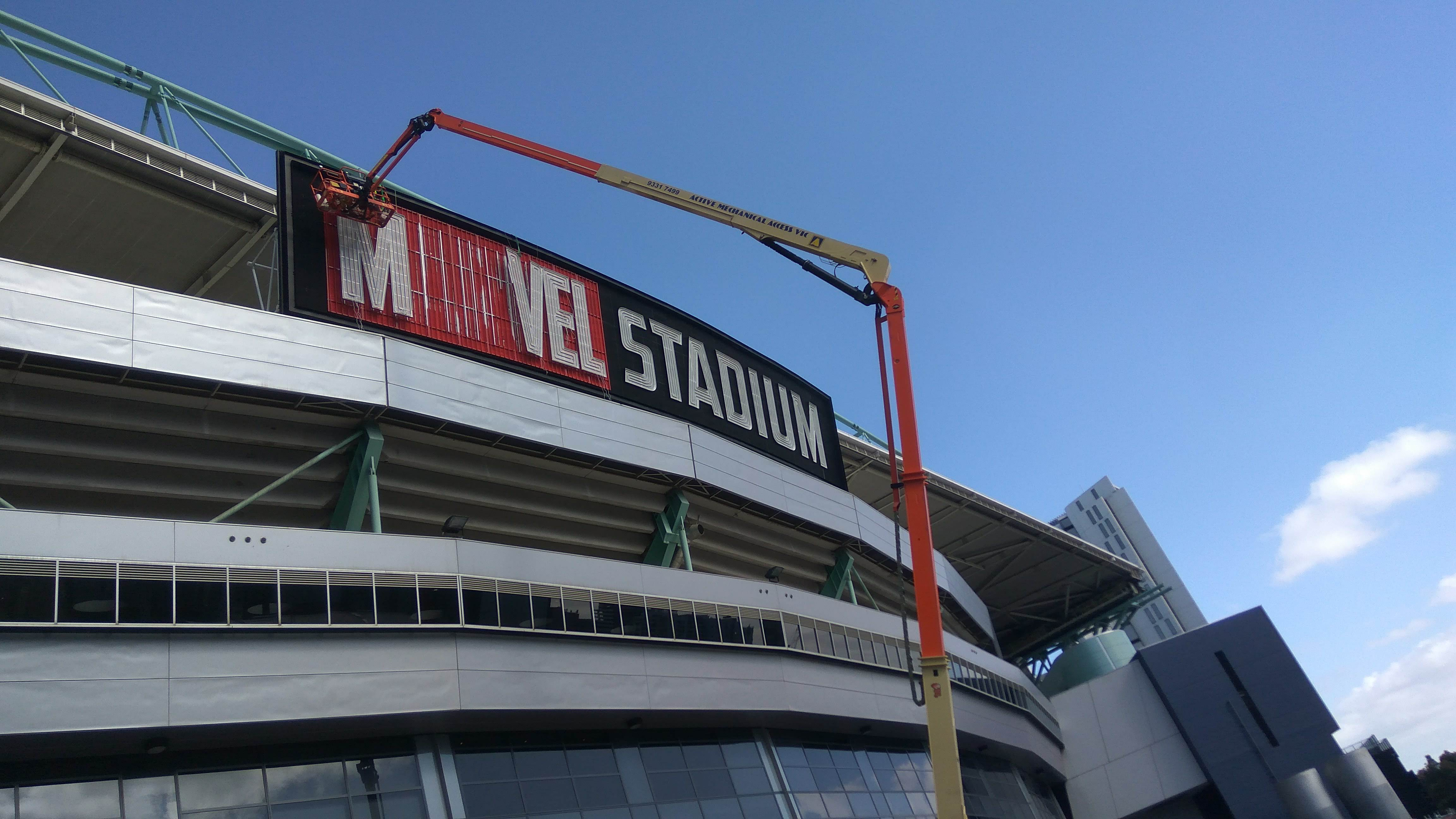
Docklands Stadium being renamed from Etihad Stadium to Marvel Stadium

The stadium has never operated under the name 'Docklands Stadium', having been covered by naming rights deals throughout its entire operating history. When it opened, the Colonial State Bank paid $32.5 million for 10 years of naming rights, and the stadium opened as Colonial Stadium. The same year, Commonwealth Bank took over the Colonial State Bank and began to discontinue the brand. Commonwealth then sold the balance of the naming rights contract to Telstra for about $50 million, and the stadium's name was changed to Telstra Dome in October 2002. During this time it was colloquially referred to as "The Dome" – a colloquialism used actively by clubs which were sponsored by rival telecommunications companies (such as Essendon with 3 and Carlton with Optus).

In March 2009, the naming rights transferred to Etihad Airways. The venue became known as Etihad Stadium under a five-year deal, which was later extended to ten years, at a cost estimated at between $5–$8 million per year. This once again caused problems, as the AFL would not initially recognize the new name due to its deal with rival airline Qantas. The league recognized the new name only after further negotiation between the two parties.

In September 2018, the stadium was renamed Marvel Stadium after the stadium operators negotiated an eight-year deal with the Walt Disney Company, the parent company of Marvel Entertainment, to change the naming rights and install a Marvel retail store at the venue. In July 2026, the stadium operators signed a new long-term deal to continue using the Marvel Stadium name.

== Stadium features ==
- Oval-shaped, turf playing surface of 19,053 square metres (205,080 sq ft) or 170 by 140 m (560 by 460 ft)
- Retractable roof 38 metres (125 ft) above the playing surface, opens east–west, and takes eight minutes to fully open or close.
- Movable seating (4 sections of the lower tier can move 18 metres forward to give a rectangular configuration)
- Two large internal video screens, one behind each goal (installed 2022); and two smaller internal video screens on opposite flanks of the field (original construction) – displaying scores, video replays and advertisements.
- 1,000 video seats
- 13 function rooms
- 66 corporate boxes
- Premium Club membership area, The Medallion Club
- 1700 car parking spaces across 3 levels beneath the playing surface.
- Over 700 2,000-watt lights for arena illumination
- A varying capacity of between 12,000 and 74,000, depending on the event. For example, seats can be laid on the ground.
- An AFL capacity of 53,359
- Dimensions of playing area are 159.5 metres by 128.5 metres (174.4 yards by 140.5 yards)

The ends of the ground, where the AFL goal posts are located, are named after the two leading goalkickers in VFL/AFL history: the northern end is the Lockett End, after Tony Lockett; and the southern end is the Coventry End, after Gordon Coventry. Some clubs informally use alternative names during their home games in place of those to honour their own histories.

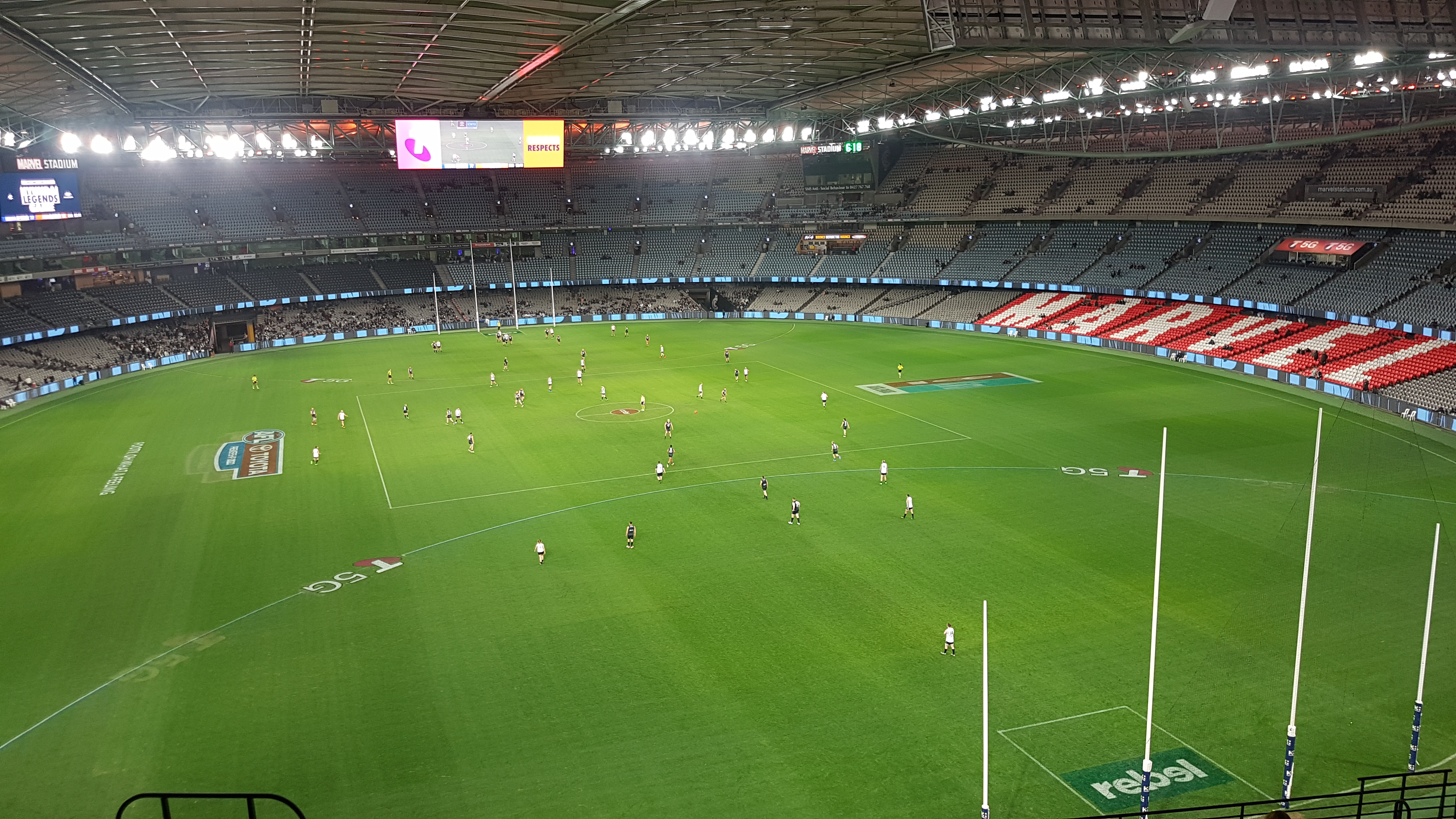
Marvel Stadium in oval configuration in 2022

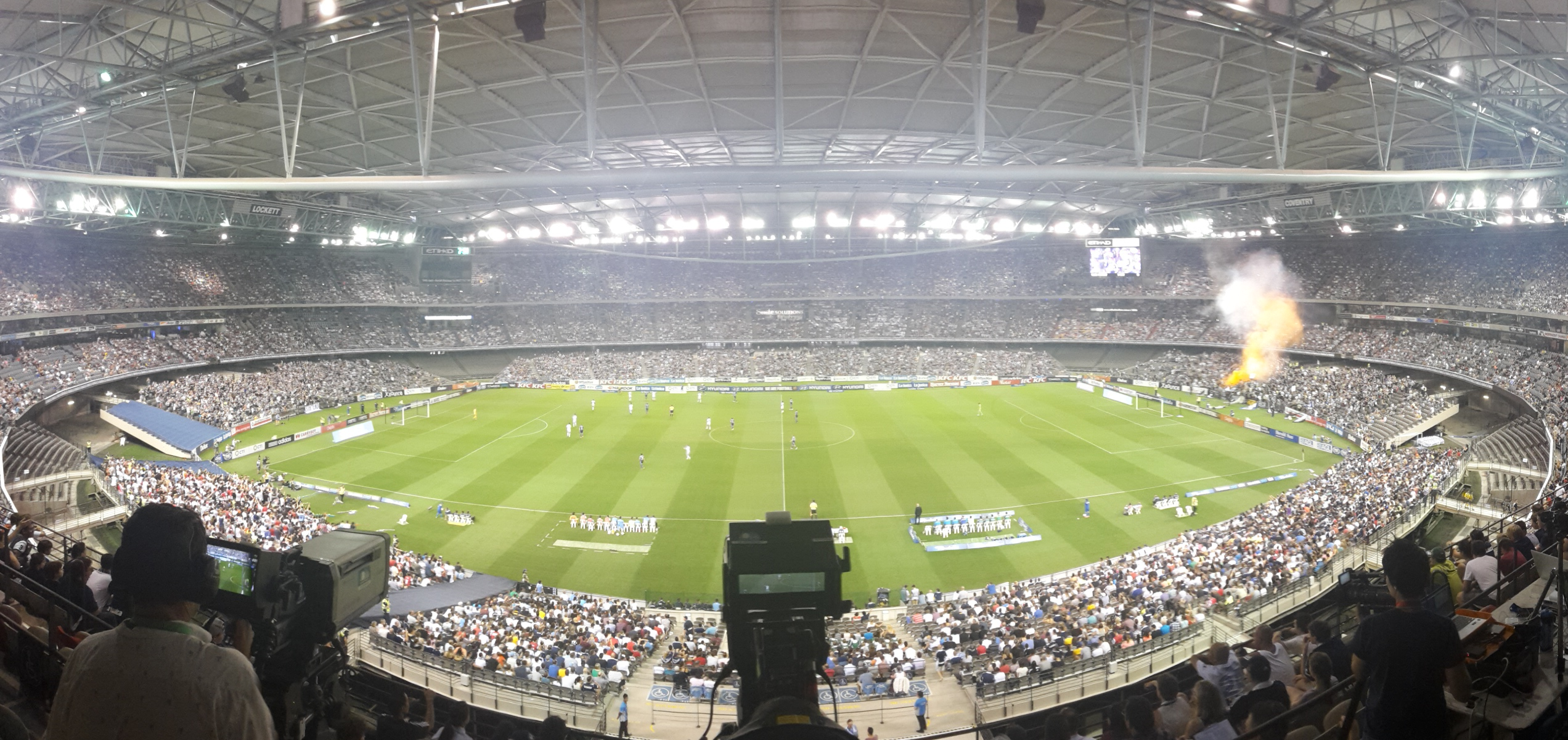
Docklands Stadium in rectangular configuration in 2015

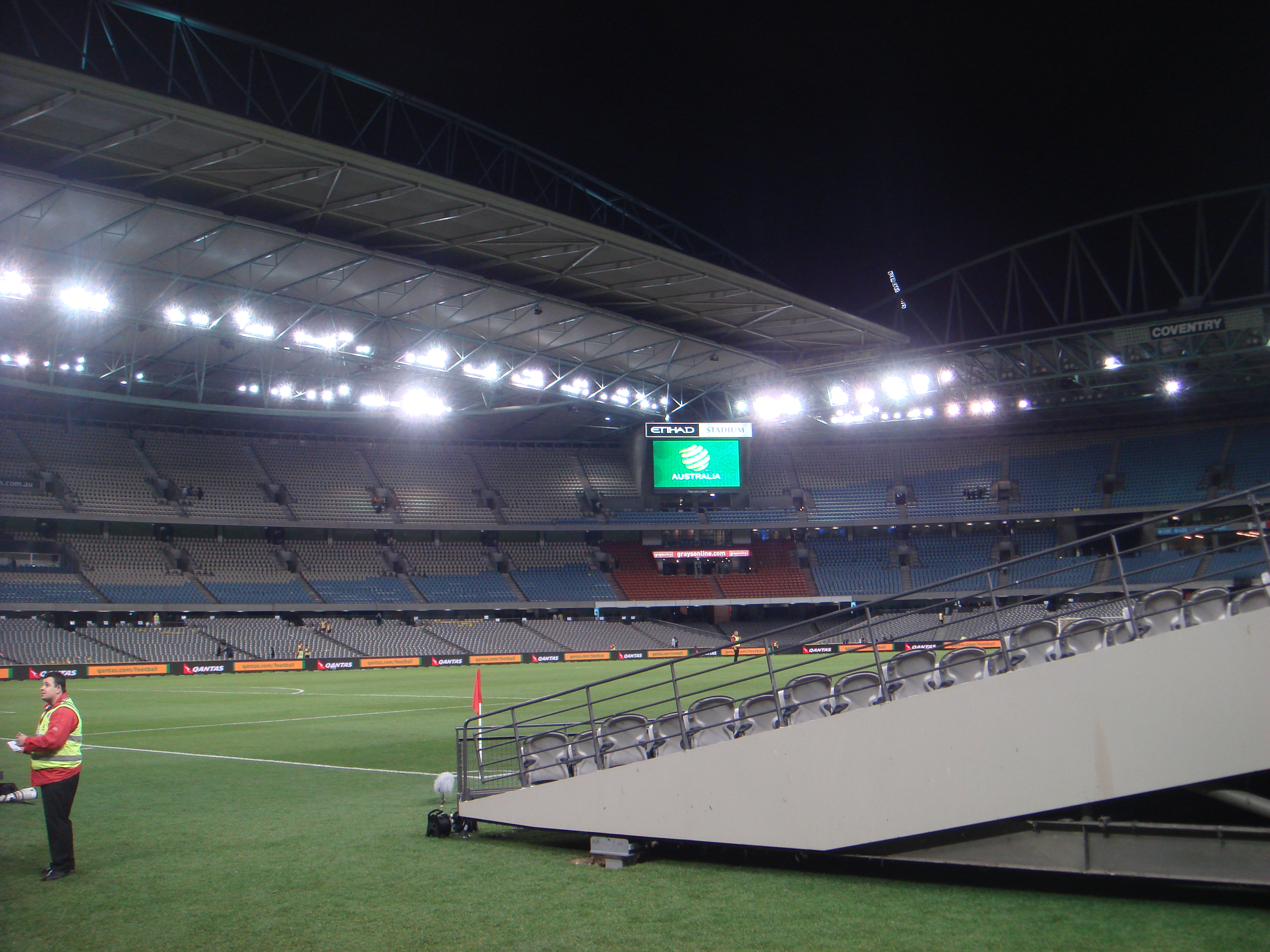
A section of the movable seating

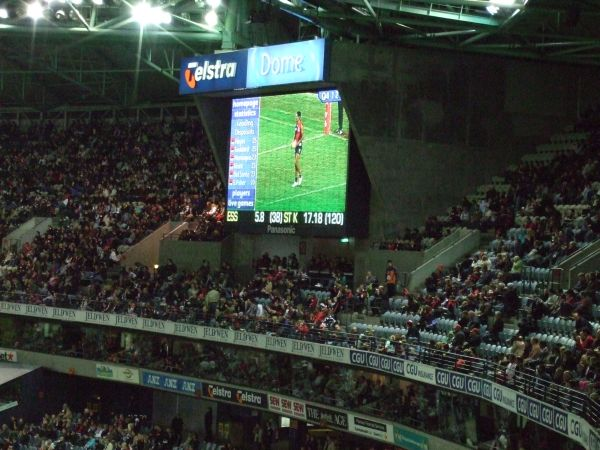
One of the original, smaller LCDs at Docklands Stadium

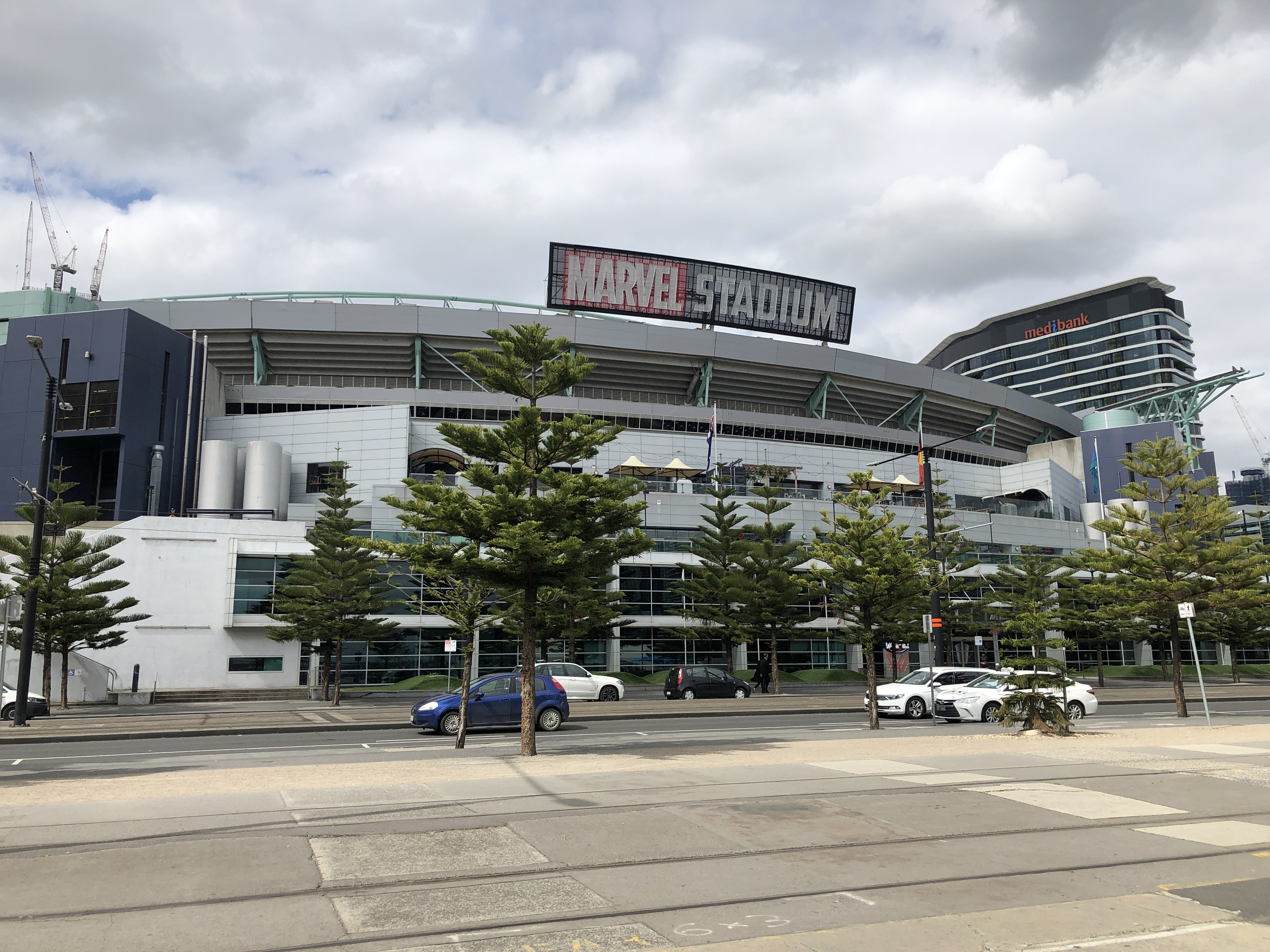
Exterior view of the stadium as seen from the harbour side

== Use ==
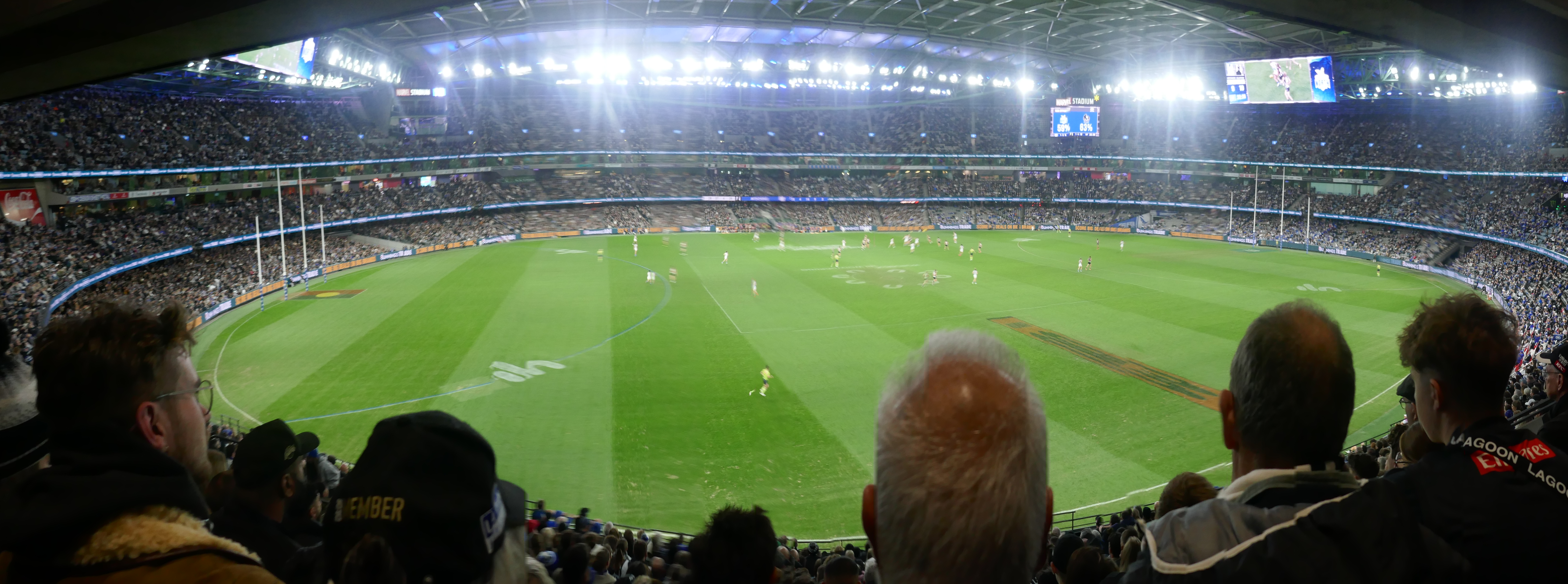
A panoramic view of Marvel Stadium during an AFL match in May 2025

=== Australian rules football ===
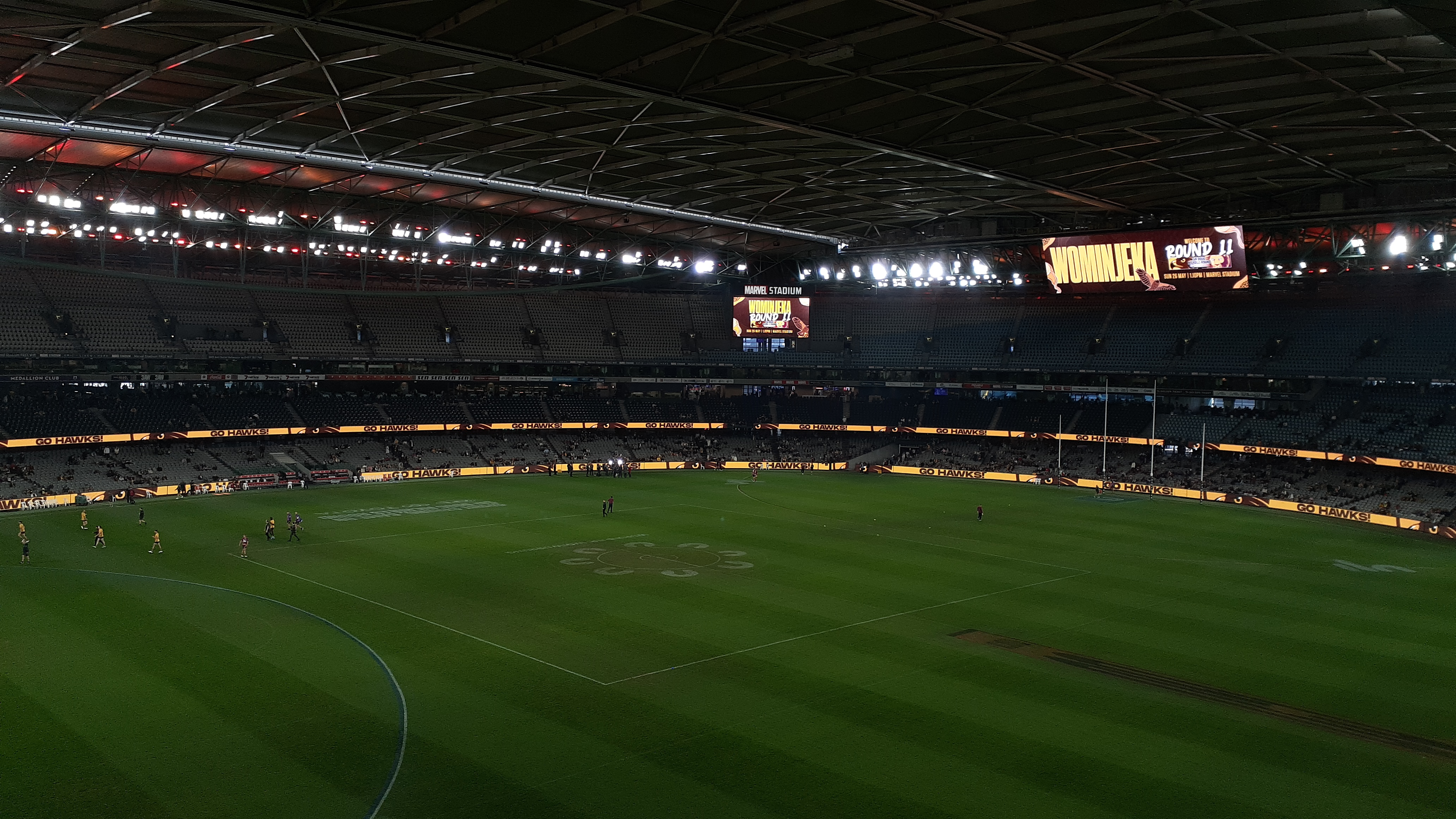
Docklands Stadium prior to an AFL match in May 2024

Docklands Stadium was initially built as the principal venue for Australian rules football matches after the Melbourne Cricket Ground (MCG), following Waverley Park's closure in 2000. As of 2024, five AFL teams have deals in place to play home games at Docklands Stadium:

- St Kilda – ten home games per year. The club has played almost all home games at the venue since it opened in 2000.
- Western Bulldogs – nine home games per year. The club has played almost all home games at the venue since it opened in 2000.
- North Melbourne – nine home games per year. The venue has been the club's primary home ground since 2005, but it had previously played about five games per year from 2000 to 2004.
- Essendon – seven home games per year. The club has a 25-year deal, which has been in place since the stadium opened in 2000.
- Carlton – six home games per year. The club has a deal for six home games per year in place since 2005, with the exception of 2015–2017 when five home games were played.

All Victorian-based AFL teams, including those not listed here, have played some home games at the ground during its history, owing to a contractual requirement between the AFL and the stadium's original owners to stage at least 46 AFL matches per year until 2013, and 40 matches per year thereafter. Geelong and Collingwood both had deals to play around four home matches per year during the 2000s, with the latter playing two home games per year at the ground since 2014. Most other clubs still play one or two home matches there per year to make up the numbers; for example, Hawthorn have played one home game per year at the ground since 2017, and Richmond played one home game per year at the ground between 2011 and 2025.

In 2020, to mark 20 years of AFL football at the ground, the AFL named the 20 biggest moments and stories involving games played at the stadium in a video. The top 5 were as follows:

1. Jason McCartney's AFL return after nearly dying in the 2002 Bali bombings – North Melbourne vs Richmond, Round 11 (6 June), 2003
2. Lance Franklin completing a 100-goal season in 2008 – Hawthorn vs Carlton, Round 22 (30 August), 2008
3. Wayne Carey's return to face North Melbourne after his extramarital scandal involving former teammate Anthony Stevens – North Melbourne vs Adelaide, Round 6 (2 May), 2003
4. James Hird leading a final-quarter comeback with 15 touches and the winning goal – Essendon vs West Coast, Round 3 (10 April), 2004
5. St Kilda and Geelong facing off after both clubs started the 2009 season 13–0, the latest meeting of unbeaten teams in a season – St Kilda vs Geelong, Round 14 (5 July), 2009

The venue's roof was closed for all AFL matches between 2019 and 2025. In 2026, the AFL changed its policy to having an opened the roof for clear and warm night and twilight fixtures. During all other fixture times, and if it is too cool, or poor weather is predicted, then the retractable roof will remain closed. This policy has led to an overwhelming majority of games still being played under the retractable roof.

=== Cricket ===
The venue's major summer tenant was Big Bash League side Melbourne Renegades, which played its home games at the Docklands Stadium from the league's inception in 2011/12 to 2025/26. A drop-in pitch is used to facilitate cricket at the venue. At the end of the 2016/17 Big Bash, the stadium was rated the most entertaining venue for T20 cricket in Australia.

In 2016, Chris Gayle of the Renegades and the West Indies tied the record for the fastest T20 half century (12 balls) during the last round of BBL 5 at the ground against the Adelaide Strikers.

Although it is a rare occurrence during games, a number of batters have hit the ball high enough to strike the underside of the roof, which is 38 metres (125 feet) above the playing surface. For example, in 2018, Perth Scorchers batsman Ashton Turner hit a Dan Christian delivery into the roof; under the BBL rules, such a hit is considered to be six runs, with the ball being considered dead and unable to be caught for the purpose of getting the batsman out.

The Renegades left Docklands Stadium prior to the start of the 2026/27 season, announcing they'd be playing home matches at the MCG, following in the footsteps of their cross-town rivals, the Melbourne Stars.

=== Soccer ===
The first time it was used for soccer was in 2001 between South Melbourne and Melbourne Knights in the NSL. A-League team Melbourne Victory played home matches at the stadium between 2006–07 and 2020–21. Originally, the plan was that the stadium would only be used for games against its biggest rivals, Sydney FC, in the 2006–07 A-League; but after the success of that game, the club shifted permanently from Olympic Park Stadium to Docklands from the 2006–07 season until the 2009–10 season. This gave the stadium its first major summer tenant. After the opening of the Melbourne Rectangular Stadium in 2010, the club played only high-drawing games and finals at Docklands, with all other games being played at the new stadium; and as of the 2022–23 season, Victory ceased playing home matches at the stadium. The stadium hosted the 2024 A-Leagues All Stars Games on 24 May 2024, as part of Global Football Week Melbourne.

=== Rugby league ===
In the 2001 National Rugby League season, the stadium was the permanent home ground for the Melbourne Storm, but this deal lasted only one year. The club occasionally hosted high-drawing home games and finals at Docklands after that, including their first three home games of the 2010 NRL season while awaiting the completion of their then new home ground AAMI Park. In 2023, the Storm returned to play two games at the ground, while AAMI Park was unavailable in July–August due to the 2023 FIFA Women's World Cup.

Docklands has also hosted interstate and international rugby league games. As Telstra Dome, Docklands hosted its first State of Origin game in 2006 as it hosted the deciding third game. As Etihad Stadium, the stadium also hosted Origin games in 2009 and 2012. The 2012 match attracted 56,021, a new record for rugby league at the stadium.

=== Other sports ===
The stadium has been converted to host several other sporting events. In its early years, the stadium was used for off-season one day international cricket matches, but has also held some summer matches, particularly in 2006 when the Melbourne Cricket Ground was unavailable due to preparations for the 2006 Commonwealth Games. The venue has also hosted international rugby union – including being Melbourne's venue during the 2003 Rugby World Cup – although the Melbourne Rectangular Stadium now hosts most such games. The venue has hosted international basketball, Rugby 7s at the 2006 Commonwealth Games, a 2002 non-televised WWE live event as part of the WWE Global Warning Tour: Melbourne, the 2015 UFC 193 in front of a then-record UFC attendance of 56,214 fans, a motorcycle speedway event (when it played host to the 2015 Speedway Grand Prix of Australia on a 346 metres (378 yards) long temporary track), and a controversial international darts event in 2015 in which spectators seated on the arena started throwing chairs and furniture.

=== Non-sports events ===
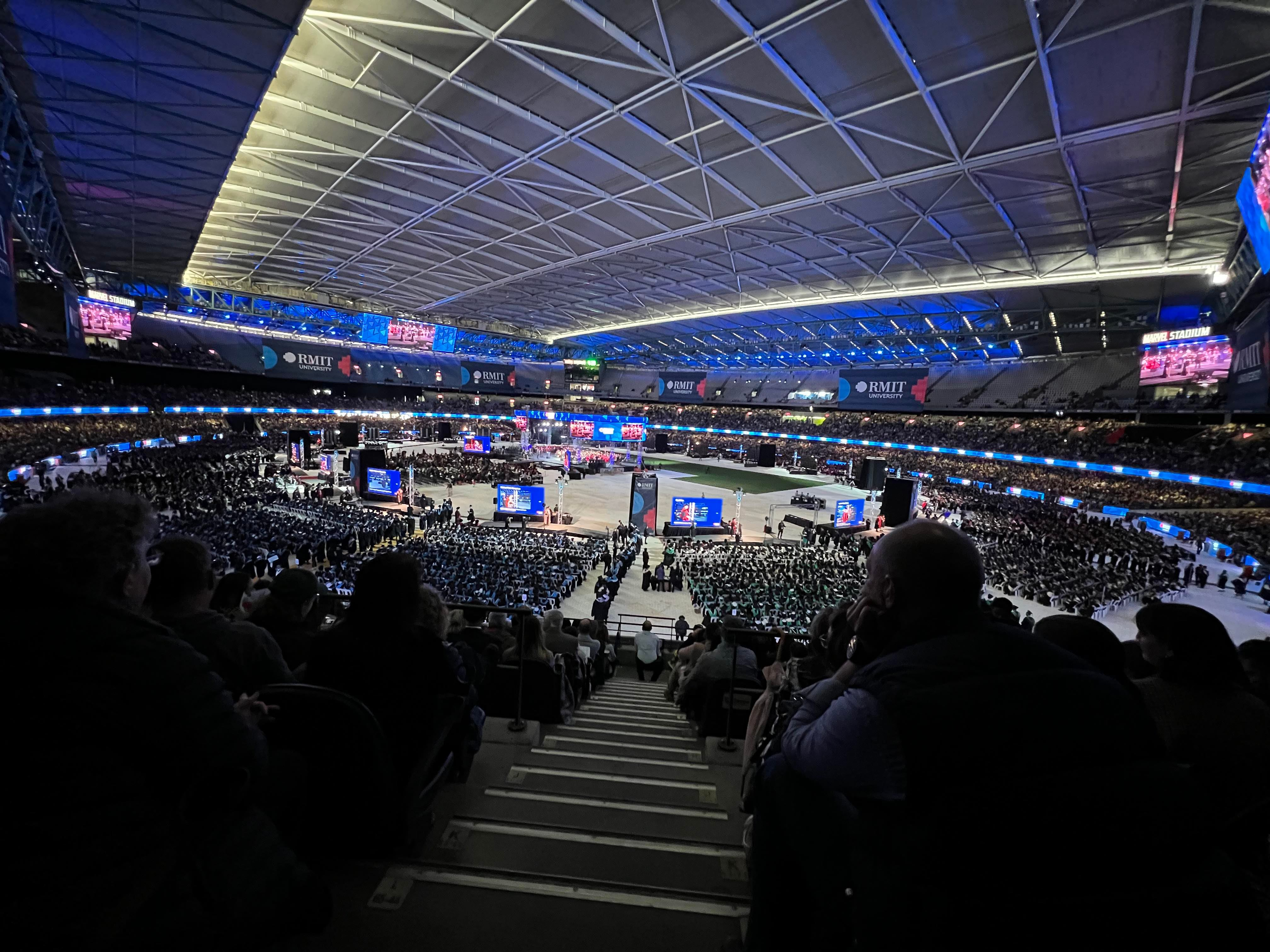
Docklands Stadium being used for a RMIT University graduation ceremony in 2022

Outside of sporting events, the stadium hosts special events and concerts. Adele holds the record for the largest concert attendance at the stadium, on the Adele Live 2017 tour. Ed Sheeran holds the record for the largest concert series attendance at the stadium, on the Divide World Tour. In November 2023, the stadium was the first in Australia to hold a K-pop concert and the first in Australia to be headlined by a female group, when Twice held their Ready to Be World Tour concert at the stadium.

RMIT University uses the stadium as the site for its graduation ceremonies annually.

On 9 July 2026, Indian Prime Minister Narendra Modi and Australian Prime Minister Anthony Albanese would stage a rally in Docklands Stadium with thousands in attendance.

List of all concerts held at Docklands Stadium
Date	Performer(s)	Attendance	Event	Ref.
15 & 17 March 2000	Barbra Streisand	70,000	Timeless Tour	
1 December 2002	Red Hot Chili Peppers	21,729	By The Way Tour	
28 February 2003	KISS	33,000	Recording of Kiss Symphony: Alive IV	
20 March 2003	Bruce Springsteen & the E Street Band	—	Rising Tour	
10 December 2003	Robbie Williams	57,027	2003 Tour	
17 December 2005	Green Day	8,439	American Idiot World Tour	
18 & 19 November 2006	U2	127,275	Vertigo Tour	
17 & 18 December 2006	Robbie Williams	125,274	Close Encounters Tour	
13–15 November 2008	André Rieu	38,605	Stadium tour with the Johann Strauss Orchestra	
20 November 2009	Pearl Jam	45,000	Backspacer Tour	
3 March 2010	George Michael	47,000	George Michael Live in Australia	
11,13 & 15 February 2010	AC/DC	181,495	Black Ice World Tour	
1 & 3 December 2010	U2	105,312	U2 360° Tour	
11 December 2010	Bon Jovi/Kid Rock	54,414	Circle Tour	
31 December 2010	Armin van Buuren	15,000	Armin Only Mirage	
1 December 2011	Eminem	61,405	Recovery Tour	
13 November 2012	Coldplay	63,378	Mylo Xyloto Tour	
5 January 2013	Mariah Carey	46,500	One-off performance	
5 & 6 March 2013	KISS/Mötley Crüe	—	Monster Tour	
7 & 8 December 2013	Bon Jovi	91,505	Because We Can: The Tour	
14 December 2013	Taylor Swift	47,257	Red Tour	
19 February 2014	Eminem	59,675	Rapture Tour	
18 & 19 September 2014	Justin Timberlake	41,777	20/20 Experience World Tour	
14 & 15 February 2015	One Direction	59,253	On the Road Again Tour	
28 February 2015	Foo Fighters	56,981	Sonic Highways World Tour	
6 & 8 December 2015	AC/DC	100,000	Rock or Bust World Tour	
12, 13 & 14 February 2016	Royal Edinburgh Military Tattoo	152,673	One-off performance	
9 & 10 December 2016	Coldplay	109,492	A Head Full of Dreams Tour	
10 March 2017	Justin Bieber	54,821	Purpose World Tour	
18 & 19 March 2017	Adele	152,300	Adele Live 2017	
30 January 2018	Foo Fighters	—	Concrete and Gold Tour	
9, 10, 11 & 12 March 2018	Ed Sheeran	256,622	÷ Tour	
26 October 2018	Taylor Swift	63,027	Reputation Stadium Tour	
10 November 2018	Usher	51,104	RNB Fridays Live	
9 November 2019	Janet Jackson	23,205	RNB Fridays Live	
15 November 2019	U2	59,726	Joshua Tree Tour 2019	
7 & 9 February 2023	Red Hot Chili Peppers	104,535	Red Hot Chili Peppers 2022 Global Stadium Tour	
24 & 25 February 2023	Harry Styles	114,829	Love on Tour	
21 October 2023	Paul McCartney	52,000	Got Back Tour	
4 November 2023	Twice	—	Ready to Be World Tour	
14 November 2023	Def Leppard and Mötley Crüe	—	World Tour	
23 & 24 February, 12 & 13 March 2024	Pink	228,000	Summer Carnival tour	
5 & 6 October 2024	The Weeknd	112,694	After Hours til Dawn Tour	
19 October 2024	Stray Kids	—	Dominate World Tour	
22 & 23 October 2024	Travis Scott	—	Circus Maximus Tour	
30 & 31 October, 2 & 3 November 2024	Coldplay	227,000	Music of the Spheres World Tour	
16 & 18 November 2024	Pearl Jam	116,000	Dark Matter World Tour	
7 & 8 February 2025	Luke Combs	—	Live in Australia 2025	
1 March 2025	Green Day	—	The Saviors Tour	
31 October, 1 & 4 November 2025	Oasis	180,000	Oasis Live '25 Tour	
8 November 2025	Metallica	60,000	M72 World Tour	
5 & 6 December 2025	Lady Gaga	125,941	The Mayhem Ball	
26, 27 & 28 February 2026	Ed Sheeran	173,387	Loop Tour	
24 September 2026	Dom Dolla	—	Melbourne 2026	
17 October 2026	Jay Chou	—	"Carnival II" World Tour	
11 November 2026	Robbie Williams	—	Britpop Tour	
14 November 2026	Foo Fighters	—	Take Cover Tour	
27 & 28 November, 2 & 4 December 2026	Harry Styles	—	Together, Together	
11 December 2026	Guns N' Roses	—	Guns N' Roses World Tour 2026	
27 January 2027	System of a Down & Faith No More	—	Australia and New Zealand 2027	
10, 12 & 13 February 2027	BTS	—	WORLD TOUR 'ARIRANG'	
19, 20, 23 & 24 February 2027	Bruno Mars	—	The Romantic Tour	
4 March 2027	Bon Jovi	—	Forever Tour	
2, 3 & 4 December 2027	Zach Bryan	—	Young Manhood and Other Donatable Organs Tour	

== Records ==
=== Attendance ===
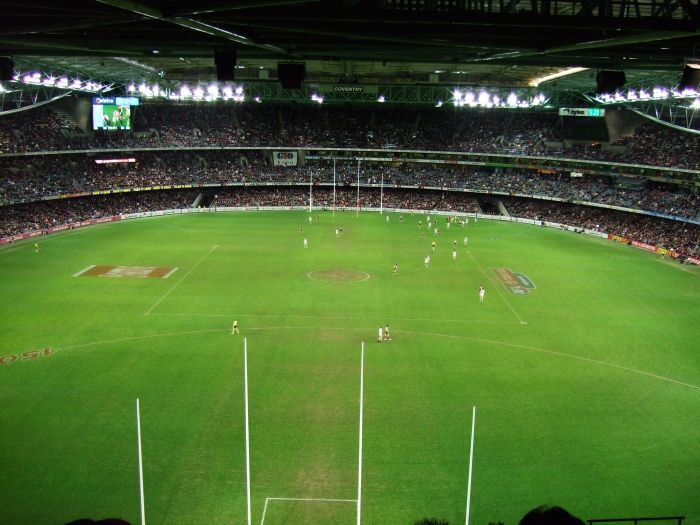
A 2008 AFL match at Docklands Stadium

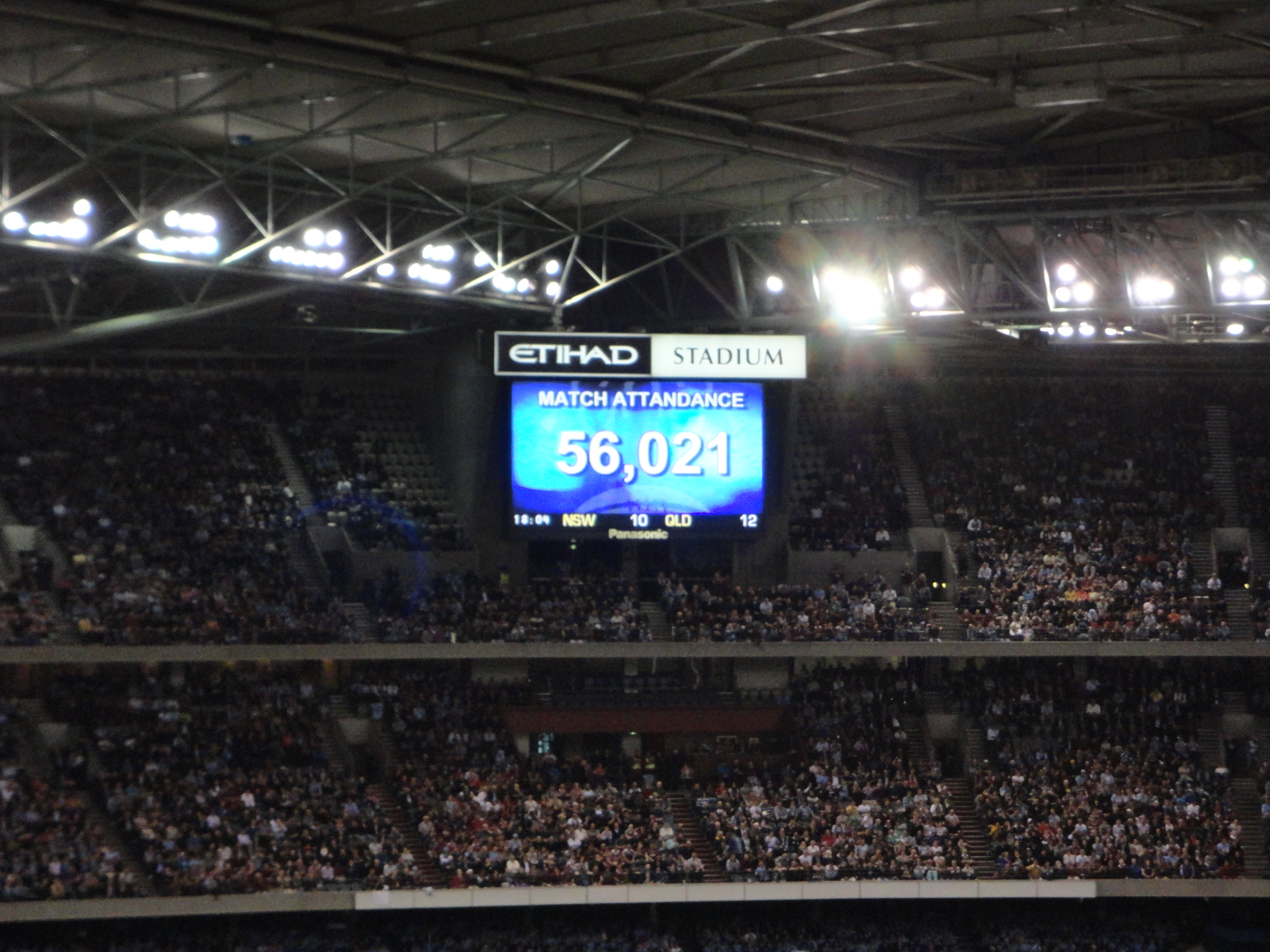
Record setting attendance at the 23 May 2012 State of Origin match between Queensland Maroons and the New South Wales Blues

Sport	Date	Crowd	Event
UFC	6 October 2019	57,127	UFC 243
Rugby union	29 June 2013	56,771	2013 British & Irish Lions tour to Australia: Australia vs British & Irish Lions
WWE	10 August 2002	56,734	WWE Global Warning Tour: Melbourne
State of Origin	23 May 2012	56,021	2012 State of Origin Game I: Queensland vs New South Wales
A-League	18 February 2007	55,436	2007 A-League Grand Final: Melbourne Victory vs Adelaide United
AFL	5 July 2009	54,444	2009 AFL season: St Kilda vs Geelong
International Football (Womens)	28 February 2024	54,120	2024 Olympics Qualification Playoff 2nd Leg: Australia vs Uzbekistan
International Football (Mens)	6 February 2008	50,969	2010 World Cup Qualification Third Round: Australia vs Qatar
International Rules	28 October 2005	45,428	2005 International Rules Series 2nd Test: Australia vs Ireland
Big Bash League	12 January 2018	44,316	2017–18 Big Bash League Round 7: Melbourne Renegades vs Melbourne Stars
Boxing	5 June 2022	41,129	George Kambosos Jr. vs. Devin Haney
One Day International		38,364	Commonwealth Bank Series
NRL	23 September 2007	33,427	2007 NRL Preliminary Final: Melbourne Storm vs Parramatta Eels

=== AFL records ===
==== Players ====
- Most games played: Nick Riewoldt (St Kilda), 184
- Most goals kicked: Nick Riewoldt (St Kilda), 452
- Most goals kicked in a match: Mark LeCras (West Coast), 12.2 (74), vs Essendon 17 July 2010
- Most disposals in a match: Bailey Dale (Western Bulldogs), 49 vs Essendon, 17 May 2025
- First AFL goal kicked: Michael Long (Essendon), 9 March 2000

==== Teams ====
- Highest winning percentage: Geelong at 66.50% from 68 wins, 34 losses and one draw
- Lowest winning percentage: Gold Coast at 27.27% from 9 wins, 24 losses
- Most wins: St Kilda with 160 wins, 6 draws and 126 losses at 55.82%
- Highest score: Geelong 35.12 (222) defeated Richmond 9.11 (65), 6 May 2007
- Lowest score: Adelaide 2.9 (21) defeated by Essendon 11.18 (84), 9 July 2021
- Highest margin: Geelong (vs Richmond), 157 points, 6 May 2007
- Highest score in a quarter: Essendon 15.4 (94) vs. Gold Coast 0.1 (1), 1 May 2011

Last updated 28 August 2023.

=== International cricket ===
The following table summarises the ODI centuries scored at Docklands.

No.	Score	Player	Team	Balls	Inns.	Opposing team	Date	Result
1	106	Michael Bevan	Australia	125	1	South Africa	16 August 2000	Won
2	114*	Steve Waugh	Australia	103	1	South Africa	16 August 2000	Won
3	103	Adam Gilchrist	Australia	79	1	ICC World XI	7 October 2005	Won

== Transport access ==
Docklands Stadium is primarily serviced by trains at Southern Cross Station, which is located on the City Loop and is serviced by most major metropolitan and country train and coach lines. The stadium is located on a public pedestrian concourse adjoining the northern end of the station.

The stadium is serviced by several tram routes:

- On Harbour Esplanade: Route 70, Route 75 and City Circle
- On La Trobe St: Route 86, Route 30 and City Circle

The stadium has a 500-vehicle carpark underneath the field, which is accessible by the public for event days.

== In popular culture ==
The venue appeared in the 2007 film Ghost Rider. Its name, wherever visible, was digitally changed to the SoBe Dome. It can be seen in the video for Jessica Mauboy's single "Running Back", as well as some television shows, such as the Seven Network's City Homicide and Network Ten's Rush.
