= Messiah (disambiguation) =

Messiah is a title given to a saviour or liberator of a group of people in Abrahamic religions.

Messiah also may refer to:

== Religious figures and titles ==
- Christ (title), Greek translation of Messiah
- Jesus, the Messiah in Christianity
- Messiah ben Joseph, or Mashiach ben Yoseph, a Jewish messiah from the tribe of Ephraim, descendant of Joseph
- Moshiach, the Messiah in Judaism

== Film ==
- The Messiah (1975 film), an Italian film
- Messiah (1999 film), a French film performance of Handel's oratorio
- The Messiah (2007 film) or Mesih, a 2007 film by Nader Talebzadeh
- Messiah (2011 film), a 2011 film
- Messiah, a 2016 short film by Australian actor and filmmaker Damian Walshe-Howling
- Sir Syed Ahmad Khan: The Messiah, a 2024 Indian Urdu-language biographical film

== Television ==
- Messiah (British TV series), a BBC television drama series
- Messiah (American TV series), a Netflix TV drama
- Messiah (Derren Brown special), a Channel 4 television show

== Literature ==
- The Messiah (novel), a novel by Marjorie Holmes
- Der Messias (Klopstock), an epic poem (ed. 1748 to 1773) by Friedrich Gottlieb Klopstock
- Messiah (English poem), a 1709 poem by Alexander Pope
- Messiah (Latin poem), a poem by Alexander Pope
- Messiah (Starling novel), a 1999 thriller by Boris Starling
- Messiah (Vidal novel), a 1954 satirical novel by Gore Vidal
- The Messiah, a novel by Marek Halter
- The Messiah, a play by the National Theatre of Brent

== Music ==
- Messiah (Handel), a 1741 oratorio by George Frideric Handel
- Messiah Stradivarius, a 1716 Stradivari violin

=== Artists ===
- Messiah (Swiss band), a death/thrash metal band from Switzerland
- Messiah (UK duo), a techno group from London
- Mr. Messiah or Yuri Kostrov, Russian electronic musician and DJ
- Mesiah or Eirik Norheim (born 1967), Norwegian musician, former member of Mayhem
- Messiah (rapper)

=== Albums ===
- Messiah (Fear Factory album)
- Messiah (Mormon Tabernacle Choir album)
- Messiah (EP), a Godflesh EP

=== Songs ===
- "Messiah", a 1994 song by The Farm
- "Messiah", a 2013 song by I See Monstas
- "Messiah", a 2015 song by Madonna from Rebel Heart
- "Messiah", a 2019 song by Nebula from Holy Shit

== Sports ==
- The Messiah (wrestler) (born 1977), American professional wrestler
- Lionel Messi or Messiah, Argentinian football player

== Other uses ==
- Messiah (software), a computer animation and rendering package
- Messiah (video game), a 2000 third person shooter video game by Interplay
- Messiah Cathedral, an Indonesian megachurch of the predominantly Indonesian-Chinese Indonesian Reformed Evangelical Church
- Messiah College, a Christian liberal arts college in Grantham, Pennsylvania
- Messiah complex, a state of mind in which an individual holds a belief that they are destined to become a savior

== People ==
- Aaron Messiah (1858-1940), French architect
- Albert Messiah (1921–2013), French physicist and author of a classic graduate text on quantum mechanics
- Messiah Marcolin (born 1967), real name Bror Jan Alfredo Marcolin, also known as Eddie Marcolin, a vocalist in the doom metal band Candlemass

== See also ==
- The Anointed One (disambiguation)
- The Chosen One (disambiguation)
- Christ (disambiguation)
- Church of the Messiah (disambiguation)
- Dark Messiah (disambiguation)
- False messiah
- Kevin Keegan (born 1951), former English association football player known as the Geordie messiah
- Mashiach (disambiguation)
- Massiah v. United States, a 1964 US Supreme Court case
- New Messiah (disambiguation)
- Savage Messiah (disambiguation)
