= The One =

The One may refer to:

== Buildings ==
- The One (shopping centre), a shopping centre in Tsim Sha Tsui, Kowloon, Hong Kong
- The One (Toronto), a mixed-use skyscraper under development in Toronto, Canada
- The One, a residential skyscraper under construction in Brisbane Quarter, Australia
- The One (Colombo), a project skyscraper under construction in Colombo, Sri Lanka
- The One (Los Angeles), a mansion in Bel Air, Los Angeles, and marketed as one of the largest homes in the United States

== Fictional characters ==
- The Chosen One (trope), a narrative trope
- The One, character in the Animorphs book series
- The One Who Is The One, the principal antagonist in James Patterson's Witch and Wizard
- The One, character in Transformers
- "The One" an alternative name for Neo in The Matrix franchise
- The One, character played by Bruce Payne in Billy the Kid and the Green Baize Vampire

== Film and television ==
- The One (2001 film), an action film starring Jet Li
- The One (2003 film), a romantic comedy film starring Richard Ruccolo
- The One (2011 film), an American romantic comedy film directed by Caytha Jentis
- "The One" (The Amazing World of Gumball), episode
- "The One" (Ghost Whisperer episode), episode
- The One (TV program), a 2008 Australian TV program about psychics
- The One: Making a Music Star, a July 2006 reality television program
- The One..., a British television sketch show that ran from 2010 to 2012
- The One (video), a recording of Michael Jackson's 2004 CBS special
- The One, a designated contestant in 1 vs. 100
- The One (TV series), a 2021 series released by Netflix
- The One (2022 film), a Russian disaster-survival film directed by Dmitry Suvorov
- "The One" (Small Achievable Goals), episode

== Literature ==
- The One (magazine), a video game magazine from the United Kingdom
- The One (comics), a comic book series by Rick Veitch
- The One (manhua), a manhua by Nicky Lee
- The One, concept in the Young Wizards book series

== Music ==
- The One (singer), South Korean singer
- The One (band), a British band
- The One, fans of Babymetal
- The one or downbeat, a beat in music

=== Albums and EPs ===
- The One (Afgansyah Reza album), 2010
- The One (Annihilator EP), 2004
- The One (Chris Jasper album), 2014
- The One (Chubb Rock album), 1991
- The One (Elton John album), 1992
- The One (Eric Benét album), 2012
- The One (Frankie J album), 2004
- The One (Jane Zhang album), 2006
- The One (Kita Alexander EP), 2022
- The One Concert Live, by Jay Chou, 2002
- The One (Sergey Lazarev album), 2018
- The One (Shinichi Osawa album), 2007
- The One (Silly Fools album), 2008
- The One (Uverworld album), 2012
- The One, by Ganja White Night, 2019

=== Songs ===
- "The One" (Aneta Sablik song), 2014
- "The One" (Backstreet Boys song), 2000
- "The One" (The Chainsmokers song), 2017
- "The One" (Elton John song), 1992
- "The One" (Foo Fighters song), 2002
- "The One" (Gary Allan song), 2002
- "The One." (Kesha song), 2025
- "The One" (Kodaline song), 2015
- "The One" (Kylie Minogue song), 2008
- "The One" (Mary J. Blige song), 2009
- "The One" (Medina song), 2011
- "The One" (M.I.A. song), 2022
- "The One" (Shakira song), 2002
- "The One" (Slaughterhouse song), 2009
- "The One" (Tamar Braxton song), 2013
- "The One" (Upper Street song), 2006
- "The 1", by Taylor Swift, 2020
- "The One", by Babymetal from Metal Resistance, 2016
- "The One", by Band-Maid from Epic Narratives, 2024
- "The One", by Betty Who from Betty, 2019
- "The One", by Carly Rae Jepsen from Emotion: Side B, 2016
- "The One", by Exo-CBX from Hey Mama!, 2016
- "The One", by Deuce from Nine Lives, 2012
- "The One", by Garbage from Not Your Kind of People, 2012
- "The One", by Jennifer Lopez from This Is Me... Then, 2002
- "The One", by Kanye West, Big Sean, 2 Chainz, and Marsha Ambrosius from Cruel Summer, 2014
- "The One", by Limp Bizkit from Chocolate Starfish and the Hot Dog Flavored Water, 2000
- "The One", by MacKenzie Porter from Drinkin' Songs: The Collection, 2020
- "The One", by Mariah Carey from Charmbracelet, 2002
- "The One", by Mark Owen from The Art of Doing Nothing, 2013
- "The One", by Millionaires, 2008
- "The One", by The Moody Blues from Strange Times, 1999
- "The One", by New Power Generation from Newpower Soul, 1998
- "The One", by Planningtorock from W, 2011
- "The One", by The Prom Kings from their eponymous album, 2005
- "The One", by Reks from Grey Hairs, 2008
- "The One", by Rita Ora from Bang, 2021
- "The One", by Ronan Keating from Twenty Twenty, 2020
- "The One", by Sharam from Get Wild, 2009
- "The One", by Terri Clark from Roots and Wings, 2011
- "The One", by Theory of a Deadman from Savages, 2014
- "The One", by Tracy Bonham from The Burdens of Being Upright, 1996
- "The One", by Twin Shadow from Confess, 2012
- "The One", by White Zombie from the soundtrack of Escape from L.A., 1996
- "The One", by W&W, 2015
- "The 1", by Janet Jackson from Discipline, 2008
- "The One: Crash to Create", by Luna Sea, 2012
- "Lighters (The One)", originally titled "The One", by Gabz, 2013

== Other uses ==
- California State Route 1, commonly referred to as "the 1" by people from Southern California
- The One (Neoplatonism)
- The One (company), a United Arab Emirates-based furniture company

== See also ==
- Absolute (philosophy)
- The Chosen One (disambiguation)
- The Great One (disambiguation)
- Henology
- Henosis
- Monad (philosophy)
- Monotheism
- One (disambiguation)
- The One and Only (disambiguation)
- The One That Got Away (disambiguation)
- Soulmate
- La Une, a Belgian TV channel
