= The Chosen One =

The Chosen One(s) may refer to:

- The Chosen One (trope), a narrative trope

== People ==
- Adam, "The Chosen One", the first man in the Bible or First man in the Qur'an nicknamed Adam-I-Safi
- LeBron James, American basketball player nicknamed "The Chosen One"
- Jeff Jarrett, American wrestler nicknamed "The Chosen One"
- Jesus, often referred to as "The Chosen One" (see names and titles of Jesus in the New Testament)
- Drew McIntyre, Scottish wrestler nicknamed "The Chosen One"
- David Moyes, Scottish football manager nicknamed "The Chosen One"
- Mustafa, Arabic for "the Chosen One", an epithet of Muhammad
- Josh Rosen, American football quarterback nicknamed "the Chosen One"
- Tyron Woodley, American mixed martial artist

== Arts, entertainment, and media ==
=== Fictional entities ===
- Anakin Skywalker, the one who was destined to bring balance to the Force in Star Wars
- Sal-Afsan, the Chosen One as prophesied by Lubal in the Quintaglio Ascension trilogy
- Ash Ketchum, protagonist of Pokémon: The Movie 2000
- Buffy Summers, referred to as 'the chosen one' in the series Buffy the Vampire Slayer
- Chandler Jarrell, the hero in The Golden Child, a 1986 film starring Eddie Murphy
- Chosen One (Star Wars), a prophecy-related concept in Star Wars
- Gabriel Belmont, main character in Castlevania: Lords of Shadow and its sequels
- Gohan, character from Dragon Ball Z referred to as the Chosen One during his fight with Cell
- Harry Potter (character), lead character in the Harry Potter series
- Neo (The Matrix), character in The Matrix franchise
- Nina Martin, lead character in seasons one and two of the TV series, House of Anubis
- Perry, a fictional character in The Brothers Grunt
- Sgt. Alex Lannon, lead character in Dominion
- Slayer (Buffy the Vampire Slayer), a young female bestowed with mystical powers in the fight against forces of darkness
- The Chosen One, character in Kung Pow! Enter the Fist
- The Chosen One, player character in the Fallout 2 video game
- The Chosen One, a character in the Animator vs. Animation series created and animated by Alan Becker
- Vladimir Dracula, lead character of the TV series, Young Dracula
- The chosen one, a leading role in The Rite of Spring by Igor Stravinsky

=== Films ===
- The Chosen Ones (1964 film), a Spanish film directed by Tulio Demicheli
- The Chosen One (1990 film), an Indian film directed by Aribam Syam Sharma
- The Chosen One: Legend of the Raven, a 1998 crime thriller starring Carmen Electra
- The Chosen One (2003 film), a Chilean slasher film directed by Nacho Argiró and Gabriel López
- The Chosen One (2007 film), an animated action comedy
- The Chosen One (2010 film), a comedy-drama directed by and starring Rob Schneider
- The Chosen Ones (2014 film), a German drama directed by Christoph Röhl
- The Chosen Ones (2015 film), a Mexican drama directed by David Pablos

=== Literature ===
- "The Chosen One", a 1967 short story by Rhys Davies
- The Chosen One (novel), a 2009 teen novel by Carol Lynch Williams
- The Chosen One, a 2010 novel by Sam Bourne
- Chosen Ones, a 2020 novel by Veronica Roth

=== Music ===
==== Albums ====
- Chosen One (Hillsong album), 1996
- Chosen One (Olu Maintain album), 2014
- Chosen Ones, a live album by Christian parody band ApologetiX (2007)
- The Chosen One, by Hipnosis (2004)
- The Chosen Ones (DJ Booker and NLE Choppa album), 2024
- The Chosen Ones (Stratovarius album), 1999
- The Chosen Ones – Greatest Hits, an album by Black Sorrows (1993)
- Chosen One (Gettomasa album), an album by Finnish rapper Gettomasa (2016)

==== Songs ====
- "Chosen One" (Smog song), 1993
- "The Chosen One", a song by The Darkest of the Hillside Thickets from the album Spaceship Zero, 2000
- "Chosen One" (The Concretes song), 2006
- "The Chosen One", a song by The B-52s for the soundtrack to Pokémon the Movie 2000
- "The Chosen One", a song by Borealis from the album Purgatory (2015)
- "The Chosen One", a song by Bread from the album Lost Without Your Love (1977)
- "The Chosen One", a song by Maher Zain from the album Thank You Allah (2009)
- "The Chosen One", the opening theme of American Dragon: Jake Long
- "The Chosen Ones" (song), by Black Sorrows (1988)
- "The Chosen One", a song by Bryan Ferry from the album Boys and Girls (album) (1985)
- "The Chosen One", a song by O.C. from the album Jewelz (1997)

=== Television ===
- The Chosen One (2019 TV series), a Brazilian web television series
- Sugo (English: 'The Chosen One'), Philippine fantasy drama television series
- The Chosen One (2023 TV series), an American Netflix television series

== See also ==
- Chosen Few (disambiguation)
- Messiah
- The Anointed One (disambiguation)
- The One (disambiguation)
- The Chosen People
