= The Eight Dimensions =

Studio album by Jay Chou
- Released: 18 July 2002
- Recorded: 2002
- Genre: Mandopop
- Language: Mandarin
- Labels: BMG, RCA, Alfa
- Producer: Jay Chou

Jay Chou chronology
Fantasy Plus (2001)	The Eight Dimensions (2002)	The One Concert (2002)

The Eight Dimensions (traditional Chinese: 八度空間; simplified Chinese: 八度空间; pinyin: Bā dù kōng jiān) is the third studio album by Taiwanese singer Jay Chou. It was released on 18 July 2002, by BMG Taiwan and Alfa Music. Chou acted as the album's sole composer, as he had on all of his preceding albums, while the lyrical content was penned by several collaborators such as Vincent Fang and Will Liu. Musically, The Eight Dimensions is an R&B and pop album that incorporates various genres such as rock, hip-hop, and soul.

The Eight Dimensions received generally favorable reviews from music critics, who directed most of the acclaim towards its sonic quality. The album was a massive commercial success and was Taiwan's best-selling album of 2002 with 335,000 copies sold, becoming Chou's second consecutive best-selling annual album after Fantasy (2001). It has since sold over 2.2 million copies across Asia. Chou promoted the album by embarking on The One World Tour, which ran from September 2002 to December 2004.

== Background and development ==
The Eight Dimensions is mainly composed of R&B songs. The arrangement of the album tracks is similar to the previous album Fantasy, with a few mainstream R&B love songs and a few Chou-style narrative works with strange styles. In the album, Chou added some different elements, trying to change the appearance of the songs through some musical effects and various arrangements.

All the songs in the album were composed by Chou, and Vincent Fang, Hsu Shih-chang, Will Liu and Chou participated in the lyrics of the album songs. Chou incorporated a lot of fantasy elements in his composition and added a lot of unrestrained ideas.

== Writing and composition ==
"Half-beast Human" is primarily electronic, with a prominent violin strings playing over the rather fast paced beat. "Peninsula Ironbox" is an R&B song with prominent usage of acoustic guitar incorporated into the music production. "Secret Code" is an R&B song about the unspoken communication between two lovers. "Dragon Fist" incorporates traditional Chinese instruments (dizi, yangqin, and gu) infused with electric guitar background over a rock beat. "The Train's Destination" is sung in the Minnan dialect for the first time.

"Split" is a power ballad with lyrics reflecting Chou's experience of not being able to attend university due to his rather poor grades. "Grandpa's Tea" is a lively song about the joy of watching Grandpa brewing a traditional Chinese tea. "Back to the Past" is an R&B love song that depicts the lonely feeling of mourning love in the dead of night. "Little Blacksmith in Milan" is rapped and sung over an Italian folk-style musical arrangement. "The Final Battle" is a song about the intense emotion in the battlefield.

== Release ==
On 26 June 2002, it was announced that Chou would be releasing a new album in the summer to compete with other prolific artists such as Andy Lau, David Tao, A-Mei, S.H.E and Vanness Wu. In early July 2002, it was announced that The Eight Dimensions would be released on 18 July. On 10 July 2002, the single "The Final Battle" premiered simultaneously on 20 radio stations across four continents to an audience of 500 million listeners around the world, reaching as far as London, Australia and New Zealand. On 11 July 2002, Chou attended a pre-order event for his new album in Taipei. Chou held a press conference for his new album on its release date; at the event the record company hilariously arranged for seven women in bellybands to appear as Jolin Tsai.

The Eight Dimensions was sold out on the first day of its release; fans complained that they could not buy the album and the record company said that the album's sales had reached platinum figures. On the first day of the release of the album, its sales accounted for more than 70% of the sales of Taipei record stores. On 18 August 2002, Chou held a press conference for the album in Beijing.

=== Title and artwork ===
The inspiration for the album The Eight Dimensions comes from some movies and music videos that Chou usually watches. Therefore, the songs in the album are like movies, and the plots of each part are different. The literal Chinese name for the album is named "Octave Space" because Chou wanted to create his own music in the space of the Western octave scale and show the eighth art in the field of music. The album cover is a futuristic looking graphic, which includes a superimposed model of Chou's skull/head.

=== Singles and music videos ===
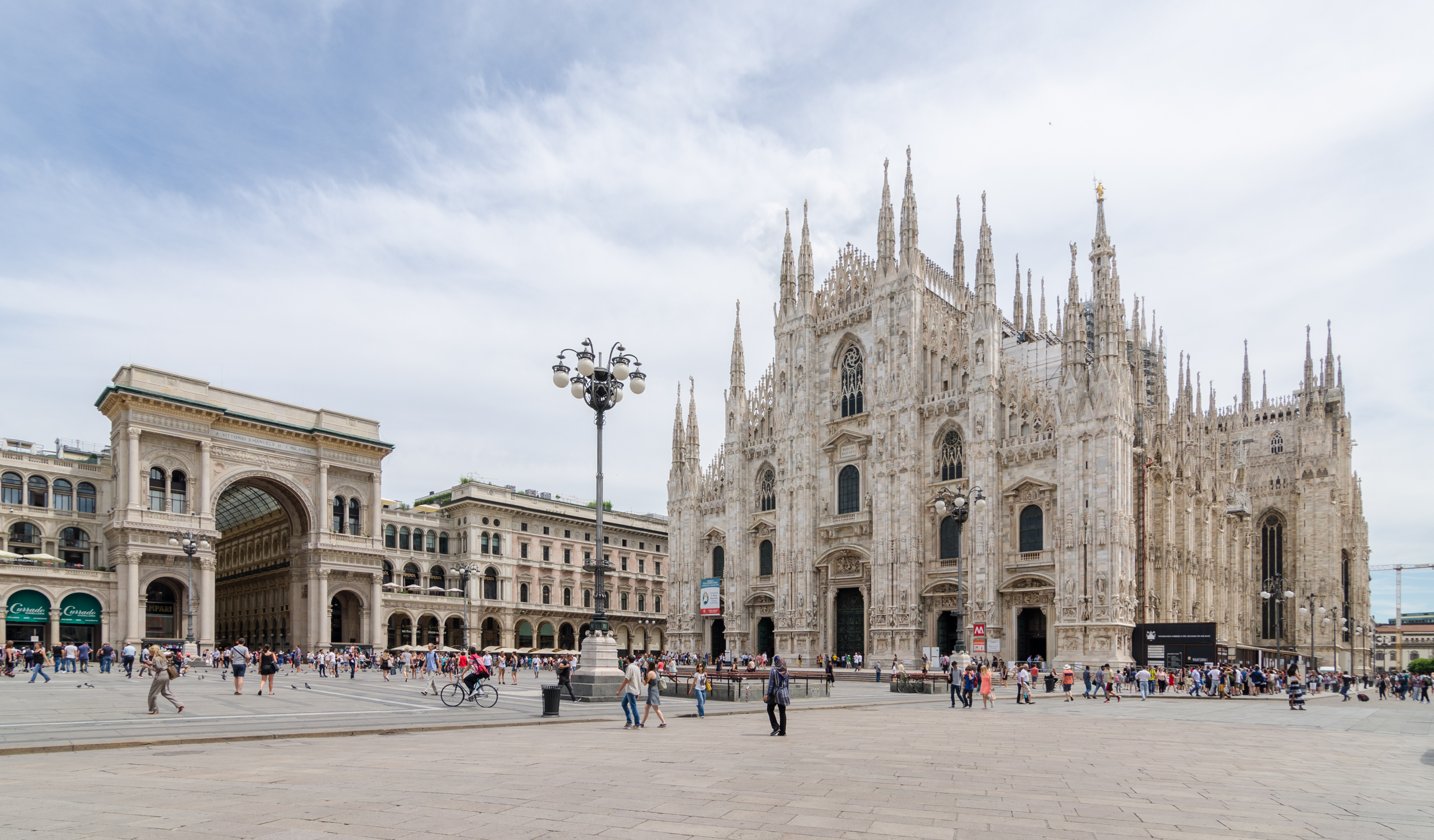
The music video for "Little Blacksmith in Milan" depicts scenes in Milan, Italy

In 2002, Chou served as the spokesperson for Warcraft III: The Frozen Throne in Taiwan. He also produced and sang the Chinese theme song of Warcraft III: The Frozen Throne, "Half-beast Human"; Chou said that he wrote this song after watching the game screen more than a month ago and understanding the entire story of the game. The song's music video, which was directed by Kuang Sheng, uses the beautiful scenes from the game as the background, with Chou interspersed in the background.

In early March 2002, Taiwan Chinese Culture Enterprise Co., Ltd. launched the book "Peninsula Ironbox." The book was written by Chou's lyric partner Vincent Fang, and Chou starred in the book. Although the book contains more than 200 pictures of Chou's life, many people still call it an alternative "photo album." Soon after, Chou wrote his own lyrics, using the box to fill with memories of his lover, and created the song "Peninsula Ironbox." The song's music video was directed by Kuang Sheng, which revolves around scenes of weird items/characters in the ironbox as Chou whizzes pass through each of them.

The music video for "Secret Code" was directed by Zhang Hengtai, and features Chou and his love interest being playful with one another as what couples usually do, and also scenes of Chou singing over a hanging microphone. The music video for "Dragon Fist" was directed by Richard Ouyang and revolves around martial arts. The music video for "The Train's Destination" was directed by Kuang Sheng and revolves around scenes of Chou singing in a train carriage, reminiscing the past.

The music video for "Split" was directed by Kuang Sheng, and contains scenes of Chou in two persona: one who is attending university whilst another who is a dropout. The music video for "Grandpa's Tea" was directed by Zhang Hengtai, and depicts an old man brewing tea gleefully, along with Chou rapping and singing against a traditional Chinese home background. The music video for "Back to the Past" was directed by Zhou Getai and depicts the intense infatuation of a girl towards the boy (Jay Chou), whilst Chou is singing in the school yard. Kuang Sheng directed the music video for "Little Blacksmith in Milan," which contains scenes of Chou roaming around the city of Milan, with Milan's unique architecture featured dominantly in the video. The music video for "The Final Battle" was directed by Kuang Sheng and was shot on a battlefield.

The tracks, "Secret Code," "Back to the Past," and "The Final Battle" are listed at number 1, number 5, and number 42 respectively on the 2002's Hit FM Top 100 Singles of the Year chart.

== Critical reception ==
Professional ratings
Review scores
Source	Rating
MTVChinese.com	3/5 stars

MTVChinese.com awarded the album three out of five stars and stated that it didn't have many new ideas and was weaker than the previous two albums. An editor from Apple Music Taiwan commented: "In the 43-minute-long Octave Space, Jay Chou uses his exuberant creativity and imagination to continuously show such ambition, and in a seemingly limited musical space, he has opened up a fantasy world without dimensional restrictions." Tencent Music's Wave Review Panel ranked The Eight Dimensions 5th place in their list of the "200 Best Chinese Albums of 2001–2020", recognizing the record as maintaining the consistent standard of Jay Chou's albums.

== Accolades ==
In 2003, the album won the G-Music Billboard Platinum Music Award for Top Ten Gold Discs, the Chinese Pop Music Media Award for Top Ten Chinese Albums, and the Singapore Golden Melody Award for the Best-selling Male Singer Album of the Year. The album was nominated for five 14th Golden Melody Awards. The album also won for an IFPI Hong Kong Top Sales Music Award for Best Selling Mandarin Album of the Year.

"Peninsula Ironbox" won the 2002 MusicRadio China Top Chart "Hong Kong and Taiwan Top Ten Golden Songs" award and the 3rd Chinese Music Media Awards "Top Ten Chinese Songs of 2002." In 2003, the song "Back to the Past" won the Gold Award for Most Popular Mandarin Song at the 2002 Top Ten Golden Songs Awards, the HITO Pop Music HITO Longevity Song Award and the HITO Pop Music HITO Male Favorite Karaoke Award. On January 14, 2003, the song "Secret Code" won the Hito Pop Music Award for "Hito Chinese Song"; on March 28 of the same year, the song won the 3rd Music Billboard "Hong Kong and Taiwan Annual Top Ten Golden Songs" award.

== Live performances ==
On 11 August 2002, Chou performed the song "Dragon Fist" at the Hong Kong Fan Club. On 20 August 2002, Chou performed at the 2002 "For the Next Generation" Asian Outstanding Musicians Concert at Shanghai with singers such as Kelly Chen, Jordan Chan and Karen Mok. Chou performed "Peninsula Ironbox" at the 2002 MusicRadio China TOP Chart Awards Ceremony. On 18 October 2002, Chou performed "Dragon Fist" at the 11th Golden Rooster and Hundred Flowers Film Festival Opening Ceremony. In 2003, Chou performed "Back to the Past" at the 2002 Top Ten Songs Awards Ceremony. On 28 March 2003, Chou performed "Secret Code" at the 3rd Music Billboard Awards Ceremony. On 31 December 2003, Chou performed "Grandpa's Tea" at the 2004 Dongfeng Satellite TV New Year's Eve Concert. Li Fei and Chou performed the song "Dragon Fist" together at the Spring Festival Gala on 21 January 2004. On 20 August 2011, Chou performed "The Final Battle" at the Hong Kong Noisy Music Festival.

On 28 September 2002, Chou began to embark on his second concert tour entitled The One World Tour. The tour began at the Taipei Municipal Stadium in front of 35,000 fans. The tour ended at the Huanglong Sports Center on 3 December 2004.

== Track listing ==
All music is composed by Jay Chou.

No.	Title	Lyrics	Length
1.	"Half-beast Human" (半獸人)	Vincent Fang	4:05
2.	"Peninsula Ironbox" (半島鐵盒)	Jay Chou	5:17
3.	"Secret Code" (暗號)	Hsu Shih-chang	4:28
4.	"Dragon Fist" (龍拳)	Vincent Fang	4:32
5.	"The Train's Destination" (火車叨位去)	Vincent Fang	4:34
6.	"Split" (分裂)	Jay Chou	4:12
7.	"Grandpa's Tea" (爺爺泡的茶)	Vincent Fang	3:57
8.	"Back to the Past" (回到過去)	Will Liu	3:51
9.	"Little Blacksmith in Milan" (米蘭的小鐵匠)	Vincent Fang	3:58
10.	"The Final Battle" (最後的戰役)	Vincent Fang	4:11
