= List of Greek morphemes used in English =

Greek morphemes are parts of words originating from the Greek language. This article lists Greek morphemes used in the English language.

== Common morphemes ==
Morpheme	Definition	Example word
Andr	Man	Android: a machine made to look like a man
Anthrop	Humankind	Anthropology: the study of humankind (see logy)
Arch	Rule; govern	Gynarchy: Government by a woman [see gyn]
Archae	Ancient; old	Archaeology: The science or study of antiquities, esp. prehistoric antiquities, such as the remains of buildings or monuments of an early epoch, inscriptions, implements, and other relics, written manuscripts, etc. [see logy]
Bath	Depth	Bathometer: a device measuring depth (see meter)
Biblio	Book	Bibliophobia: the fear of books [see phobia]
Caco	Bad	Cacography: poor handwriting [see graph]
Centr	Center	Centerpiece: an ornamental object used in a central position, esp. on the center of a dining-room table
Chrom	Color	Polychrome: having many colors [see poly]
Chron	Time	Chronological: being in time order
Cycl	Circle	Bicycle: a vehicle with two wheels in tandem, usually propelled by pedals connected to the rear wheel by a chain, and having handlebars for steering and a saddlelike seat. [see bi]
Dem	People	Democracy: Government by the people; a form of government in which the supreme power is retained and directly exercised by the people
Di	Two	Dichromatic: having two colors [see chrom]
Dyn	Power	Dynasty: a sequence of rulers from the same family, stock, or group
Erg	Work	Ergonomics: the science of equipment design, intended to maximize productivity, especially in the workplace
Eu	Good	Euphony: pleasant combinations of sound [see phon]
Gen	Origin; kind	Genesis: the first book in the Bible
Geo	Earth	Geology: the study of the earth [see logy]
Gon	Angle	Polygon: a many sided shape [see poly]
Graph; gram	Write; draw; record	Telegraph: the long-distance transmission of written messages without physical transport of letters [see tele]
Gyn	Woman	Misogyny: The hatred of women [see miso]
Helio	Sun	Heliotherapy: therapeutic exposure to sunlight [see therap]
Hem; haem	Blood	Hemorrhage: a profuse discharge of blood
Hemi	Half	Hemisphere: one of the halves into which the earth is divided
Hetero	Unlike; different	Heterogeneous: Differing in kind; having unlike qualities; possessed of different characteristics; differing in origin [see gen]
Homo	Same	Homogenous: Having a resemblance in structure, due to descent from a common progenitor with subsequent modification [see gen]
Iso	Equal	Isography: Imitation of another's handwriting [see graph]
Latry	Worship	Idolatry: the religious worship of idols
Log	Word; idea; study	Dialog: A conversation between people. (dia: through) + (logos: speech, reason) = ("exchange of thoughts")
Logy; ology	Discourse; learn	Trilogy: a set of three works of art that are connected
Macro	Long	Macrocosm: any large thing; universe
Mancy	Prophecy	Bibliomancy: prophesying by use of books [see biblio]
Machia; Machy	War; fight	Theomachy: war or struggle between gods [see theo]
Mania	Madness	Pyromaniac: A person suffering from pyromania; A person who is obsessed with fire; one who lights things on fire
Mega	Large	Megalomania: a mental disorder characterized by delusions of power [see mania]
Meter	Measure	Diameter: the length of a straight line passing from side to side of any figure or body, through its center
Micro	Small	Microscopic: so small it's hard to see [see scop]
Miso	Hate	Misology: the dislike of arguments (see log)
Mono	One	Monopoly: an exclusive privilege to carry on a business, traffic, or service, granted by a government
Olig	Few	Oligarchy: a form of government all the power resides with few people [see arch]
Ortho	Correct; straight	Orthodontics: the branch of dentistry dealing with the prevention and correction of irregular teeth
Pan	All	Pandemic: prevalent throughout an entire country, continent, or the whole world [see dem]
Para	Beside; beyond; abnormal	Paralysis: loss of muscle function for one or more muscles
Path	Feeling; disease	Sociopath: a person, whose behavior is antisocial and who lacks a sense of moral responsibility or social conscience.
Phil	Friend	Philanthropy: the desire to help others [see anthrop]
Phobia	Fear of	Arachnaphobia: The fear of spiders
Phon	Sound	Euphonic: Pleasing to the ear [see eu]
Poly	Many	Polymath: a person whose expertise spans a significant number of different subject areas
Rhe	Flood; flow; gush; burst	Logorrhea: a flood of words spoken quickly (see log)
Scop; scept	Look at; examine	Kaleidoscope: A toy in which reflections from mirrors make patterns
Sphere	Ball	Atmosphere: the layer of air and gas around the Earth and other planets
Stat; stas	Stop	Static: showing little or no change
Tel; tele	Far; distant	Telephone: Apparatus designed to convert sound waves into electrical waves which are sent to and reproduced data distant point [see phon]
Theo	God	Atheist: one who believes in no gods
Therap	Cure	Therapy: Treatment of illness or disability

== See also ==
- English words of Greek origin
