= Hipnosis =

Hipnosis may refer to:

- Hipnosis (Italian band), an Italian synthpop group
- Hipnosis (Cuban band), a Cuban rock band
- Hipnosis (Chetes album), 2010
- Hipnosis (Jackie McLean album), 1978
- Hipnosis (Shootyz Groove album), 1997

== See also ==
- Hipgnosis, an English art design group active from the late-1960s to the early-1980s
- Hypnosis, a state of human consciousness involving focused attention and reduced peripheral awareness characterized by enhanced capacity for response to suggestion
