= Few =

A few means one or more, but not many. Few or FEW may also refer to:

== People ==
- Bobby Few (1935–2021), an American musician
- Ignatius Alphonso Few (1789–1845), an American preacher and academic, first president of Emory College (now Emory University)
- Mark Few (born 1962), an American basketball coach
- Robyn Few (1958–2012), an American rights activist
- William Few (1748–1828), an American founding father from Georgia
- William Preston Few (1867–1940), the first president of Duke University
- Francis E. Walter (1894–1963), an American politician from Pennsylvania
- Frank Elbridge Webb (1869–1949), an American engineer and presidential candidate

== Other uses ==
- The Few, British aviators in the Battle of Britain
- Few (album), fifth studio album by rock band He Is Legend
- Francis E. Walter Dam, a dam, recreational area, and disc golf course in Pennsylvania
- French Engineering Works, a South African tool manufacturer
- FEW, Französisches Etymologisches Wörterbuch (German: French Etymological Dictionary)

== See also ==
- Chosen Few (disambiguation)
- Quantity
- Fue (disambiguation)
