= Zvi Eckstein =

Israeli economist

- צבי אקשטיין
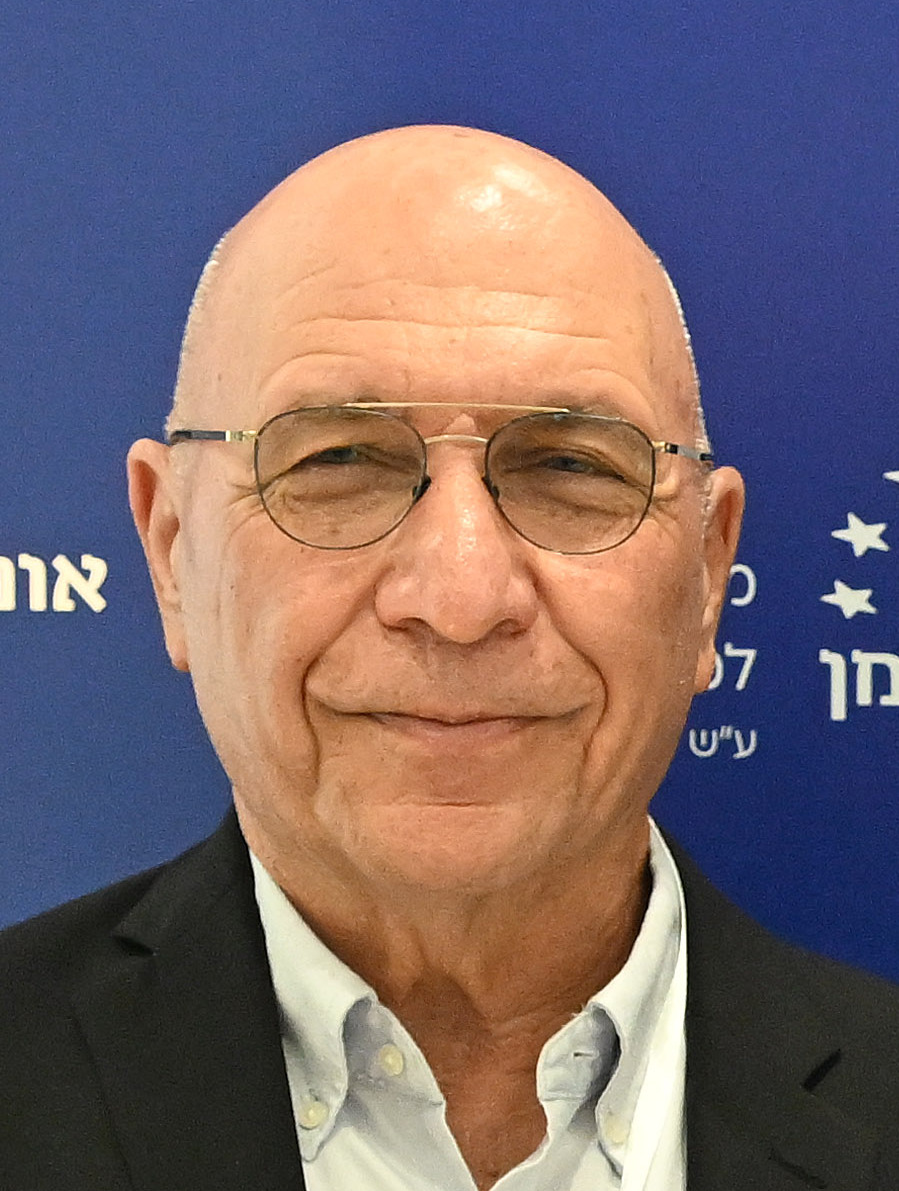
- Eckstein, 2024
- Born: April 9, 1949 (age 77); Ramat Gan

Academic background
- Education: University of Minnesota; Tel-Aviv University
- Doctoral advisor: Anne Osborn Krueger

Academic work
- Institutions: Yale University; Tel Aviv University; Carnegie-Mellon University; University of Pittsburgh; Boston University; University of Minnesota; Bank of Israel; Interdisciplinary Center Herzliya

Zvi Eckstein (Hebrew: צבי אקשטיין; born April 9, 1949) is an Israeli professor emeritus and former dean of the Tiomkin School of Economics and head of the Aaron Institute for Economic Policy at Reichman University in Herzliya. He is a professor emeritus at Tel Aviv University's Eitan Berglas School of Economics, and the Judith C. and William G. Bollinger visiting professor at the Wharton School, University of Pennsylvania. Served as Deputy Governor of the Bank of Israel (2006–2011) and the Walras-Bowley Lecturer and a Fellow of the Econometric Society in Pittsburgh, Pennsylvania, U.S.

== Biography ==
Zvi Eckstein was born in Ramat Gan and moved with his mother to Kibbutz Yakum, where he lived until after his army service. He served in the armored corps of the IDF. He has a bachelor's degree in economics from Tel Aviv University (1974) and studied at the University of Minnesota, USA (1976-1980), for which he received a Korda scholarship and received his doctorate in 1981. His Doctoral Dissertation was: "Rational Expectations Modeling of Agricultural Supply: The Egyptian Case". His doctorate instructors were professors Anne Krueger (World Bank Chief Economist, and the first deputy managing director of the International Monetary Fund (IMF) and the professors Christopher Sims and Thomas Sargent (2011 Nobel prize in economics recipients). Worked at Yale University, Department of Economics & Economic Growth Center as assistant professor (1980-1984)

In 1983 was appointed as lecturer at the department of economics, Tel-Aviv University, appointed senior lecturer with tenure in 1985, an associate professor in 1989 and a full professor in 1999. Head of the Eitan Berglas School of Economics (1999-2001). Was a visiting associate professor at the department of economics Carnegie Mellon University, GSBA, (1986-1987), Visiting associate professor at the department of economics at University of Pittsburgh. (1987-1988). Professor at the Department of Economics, Boston University (1989-2001). Department of Economics professor at the University of Minnesota (2001-2006).

He has won 7 research grants from the National Science Foundation (USA), 3 research grants from the Israel Science Foundation (ISF), a research grant from the National Institute of Child Health and Human Development, a research grant from the German-Israeli Foundation for Scientific Research and Development and a research grant from the United States – Israel Binational Science Foundation. On June 19, 2008 Zvi Eckstein gave the Walras-Bowley lecture at The Econometric Society North America Summer Meetings. This is an annual lecture that is delivered by a selected European economist and the subject of his lecture, presented along with Dr. Osnat Lifshitz was "Dynamic Female Labor Supply". Served as editor of the European Economic Review

Since January 2011 Eckstein has been serving as dean founder of the school of economics at the Interdisciplinary Center Herzliya – IDC. Serves also as dean of Arison School of Business at the IDC since August 2014. Serves as head of the Aaron Economic Policy Institute, IDC, Herzliya, since the establishment of the institute in March 2014.Since 1981 he is a member of the econometric society and American Economic Association. Since 1997 he is a research fellow at the Centre for Economic Policy Research (CEPR). Since 1998 he is a research fellow at the Institute for the Study of Labor (IZA).In 2000 was chosen to be a fellow of The Econometric Society.

== Personal life ==
Zvi Eckstein is married to Hadassa since 1975 with whom he has 3 children.

== Business and public activity ==
Zvi Eckstein Served as Chairman of the Investment Committee and Director in LHAK Mutual funds of Bank Hapoalim, Israel (1992-1993). Served as Director from the Public of Mey Eden Cooperation, Israel. (1992-1997). Appointed by the minister of absorption Yair Tzaban to Chairman of a professional committee “For the advancement of the employment of engineers and other experts among the immigrants and for the utilization of the human capital of the recent immigration wave” (1995-1994). Chairman of the Investment Committee and Director of the Provident Funds of the Mercantile Discount Bank, Israel. (1993-1998, 2002-2006). He is a member of an Israeli government committee on the minimum wage (2000). Chairman of the Investment Committee and Director at the Provident Funds of Bank Leumi of Israel Ltd (1998-2001).

Is a Member of a Public committee appointed by the Minister of Industry, Commerce and Employment, Ehud Olmert, on revising the Anti-Trust law (2005). The same year was appointed member of a Public committee by the Defense Minister of Israel, Shaul Mofaz, on shortening the Length of Mandatory Military Service. Consultant, Federal Reserve Bank of Minneapolis (2001-2006).

While Eckstein was deputy governor at the Bank of Israel, he was head of governmental committees on foreign workers affairs, agricultural workers and Palestinian workers in Israel. He also stood at the head of the committee appointed by the minister of industry trade and labor and that outlined the long term labor policy in Israel (2010-2011).

Was head of two research teams that investigate the economic achievements of the High tech sector in Israel – one at the Office of the Chief Scientist and the other by the Science, Technology and space minister, Yaakov Peri (2013–2014).

=== Bank of Israel ===
Zvi Eckstein served as the deputy to the governor of the Bank of Israel, Stanley Fischer (2006-2011). As part of his job he led the Repo clearing process (a financial instrument to get cash in equivalent exchange for bonds and vice versa), created the regulative infrastructure that fits the Repo market in Israel. Established the capital market forum together with the accountant general in the finance ministry and was head of an interministerial team that created a regulative infrastructure and legislation of financial flows securitization in Israel. Was in charge of establishing the division of statistics, in charge of establishing and functioning of the markets division, took part in the decisions in the debates of the small team over the height of the interest rate and took part in the decisions on intervening in the Forex market as of March 2008.

== Published works ==
=== The Chosen Few: How Education Shaped Jewish History, 70-1492 ===
The Chosen Few: How Education Shaped Jewish History, 70-1492 discusses 3 economic aspects of the Jewish people, from the destruction of the second temple until the expulsion from Spain – the transfer from agriculture to trade work and the rest of the urban professions, creating the Jewish Diaspora and diluting the Jewish population especially after the destruction of the second temple and till the 7th century. The book was co-written with Maristella Botticini, head of the Gasparini Institute for Economic Research (IGIER) at Bocconi University in Milan. It was published first in English at Princeton University Press in 2012. Translated to Italian and Hebrew – published with Tel-Aviv University publications in 2013.

=== Immigration and labor market mobility in Israel, 1990 to 2009 ===
After the Dissolution of the Soviet Union in 1989, There was a large immigration of Soviet Jews to Israel. Over the following ten years, Israel absorbed approximately 900,000 immigrants from the former Soviet Union, an amount was equivalent to around one fifth of the Israeli population. The majority of these new immigrants of working age had a college education and were very experienced. As they arrived in Israel, they got a lot of benefits, including, Hebrew language training, housing subsidies, and professional education. It propose a natural experiment for testing the consequences of a large immigration inflow of skilled workers This book provides a detailed analysis of the gradual process of occupational upgrading of immigrants and the attributed rise in their wages.

The authors propose that even a very large and unexpected wave of immigration can be fit in the local labor market without any significant long-term contradictory economic effect on natives. The return on investment in local human capital (language and profession that matches skills) is very high. With that said it takes an average period of 5–7 years.

The book was published by MIT Press in 2012 and was co-written with Dr. Sarit Cohen Goldner from Bar-Ilan University and Professor Yoram Weiss from Tel-Aviv University

=== The Great Recession: Lessons for central bankers ===
The Subprime mortgage crisis shook not only the global economics but also the common perception regarding economic policy. The book tests both the central role banks played in the crisis and the role they could play in preventing or preparing for future crises.

The authors focus on monetary policy, new field of macroprudential policy, and the exchange rate matters, capital flows, financial markets and banking. They examine both developed and emerging economies, trying to understand why some, including Israel and Australia, suffered mildly from the crisis, while others – for instance Ireland – suffers from a serious financial crisis.

Eckstein edited the book together with Jacob Braude, from the research department at the Bank of Israel, Professor Stanly Fischer, Former governor of the Bank of Israel and Dr. Karnit Flug, current governor of the Bank of Israel.

== Main articles summary ==
=== Development, growth and population ===
Cities and Growth: Theory and Evidence from France and Japan

The relative population of the top 40 urban areas of France and Japan remained constant during the industrialization and urbanization periods of these countries. The authors showed that larger cities will have higher levels of human capital, higher rents and higher wages per worker. The article displays the phenomenon of cities common growth rate, the preservation of a relative city size of large cities and the lack of adding new cities or crashing of old cities during the process of urbanization that accompanies the process of economic growth. The article was co-written with prof. Jonathan Eaton from Brown University.

=== Labor Economics ===
Why Youth Drop out of High School: The Impact of Preferences, Opportunities, and Abilities

The authors developed a model that analyses the influence of studies in high-school on decisions regarding employment during school, on the accomplishments and the decision to finish high school without a diploma. The model's estimates indicate that youth that drops out of high school has different characteristics than of those who finish high school – they are of lower abilities in school or have lower motivation, they have lower expectations regarding the rewards they will receive after school ends, they place a higher value on leisure and have a lower consumption value of school attendance. The article was co-written with prof. Kenneth I. Wolpin from Rice University, Houston, Texas, USA.

Dynamic labor force participation of married women and endogenous work experience

The authors show that the decision whether to work or not is influenced by the return on the experience. This is why a woman who has acquired work experience at a young age – takes advantage of it at a later age. In this way women with education receive higher pay and acquire additional experience. Also the authors found that the younger your children the larger the husbands' salary is, the women's participation in the labor force lessens. The article was co-written with prof. Kenneth I, Wolpin of Rice University.

The Effects of Compulsory Schooling on Growth, Income Distribution and Welfare

In the article the authors use an OLG model with productive capital and human capital affecting the quality of labor. Every generation parents invest in the education of their children ignore its external influence on the aggregate production function. Government intervention in providing Compulsory education increases economic growth, while the intergenerational income distribution becomes more equal. in addition, in the long term, most of the individuals in every generation are better off due to compulsory education. The article was co-written with prof. Itzhak Zilcha, Tel-Aviv University.

Duration to First Job and the Return to Schooling: Estimates from a Search-Matching Model

The article investigates the properties of joint distribution of the duration to the first post-schooling full-time job and of the accepted wage for that job within a search-matching-bargaining theoretic model. The article was co-written with prof. Kenneth I. Wolpin of University of Pennsylvania.

Estimating a Market Equilibrium Search Model from Panel Data on Individuals

In this Paper Eckstein and Wolpin estimate a market equilibrium search model using panel data. This is the first work that estimated a Nash labor market equilibrium model based on data of individuals whereas the wage is resolved endogenic. The main finding is that a model of this sort fails to give an answer to the dispersion extent of wages between individuals with professional background and equal human capital. Therefore, it is necessary to enable in models the existence of companies with different productivity for workers with equal human capital.

=== Monetary and Macro Economics ===
Macroeconomic Consequences of Terror: Theory and the Case of Israel

The article was written in 2004 and analyses the effect of terror on the Israeli economy in the years preceding it and especially during the second intifada. The research allows understanding the changes in the trend and business cycle of the Israeli economy. The estimates show that terror has a large impact on the aggregate economy. Terror, that changed the death toll by about the same size as due to car accidents, is expected to decrease annual consumption per by about 5 percent by 2004. Had Israel not suffered from terror over the three years prior to the publication of the article, the authors estimated that the output per capita would have been 10 percent higher than it was in 2004.The article was co-written with prof. Daniel Tsiddon from Tel-Aviv University and Bank Leumi.

Stopping the inflation

Eckstein showed that stopping the inflation in Israel was done mostly as a cause of eliminating the government deficit which was financed in advanced by printing money. This was done with an insignificant price on employment but with a great benefit as a result of the inflation decline and by decreasing the damage it causes to individuals benefits in the economy.

=== Development Growth and Population ===
A Rational Expectations Model of Agricultural Supply

The article discusses the Egyptian agriculture from the beginning of the 20th century until the year 1968. There is a cyclical effect in the agriculture industries (Spider Effect). When a price goes up – the output increases more than usual and when the price goes down the output decreases more than usual. The economic literature used to address it as an irrationality of farmers. Eckstein showed that it can be attributed to the crop rotation. When the price increases the output is increased more than usual to increase profit. This causes a decrease in the fertility of the soil, since the same soil is used for the same product and later the output is decreased, when really this is a normal and rational effect.

== Books ==
- M. Botticini and Z. Eckstein, "The chosen Few: How Education Shaped Jewish History, 1492-70", Princeton University Press, August, 2012
- J. Braude, Z. Eckstein, S. Fischer, and K. Flug (editors) “The Great Recession: Lessons for Central Bankers, The MIT Press, December 2012.
- S. Cohen Goldner, Z. Eckstein and Y. Weiss Immigration and Labor Market Mobility in Israel, 1990 to 2009, The MIT Press, September 2012.
- M. Blecher, Z. Eckstein, Z. Hercowitz and L. Leiderman (editors), "Financial Factors in Stabilization and Growth", Cambridge University Press, 1996.
- Z. Eckstein (editor) Aspects of Central Bank Policy Making, Springer-Verlag: Heidelberg, 1991.
