= Mashiach (disambiguation) =

Mashiach or Moshiach (Hebrew: משיח) is a Hebrew term for the messiah in Judaism. Mashiach may also refer to:

== People ==
- Jesus
- Messiah ben Joseph
- Hasun ben Mashiach, tenth-century Karaite scholar
- Menashe Masiah (b. 1973) Israeli football referee
- Nimrod Mashiah (b. 1988) Israeli windsurfer

== See also ==
- Messiah
- Mashiach Borochoff House, US
- Messiah (disambiguation)
