= Fantasy Plus =

EP by Jay Chou
- Released: 24 December 2001
- Recorded: 2001
- Genre: Mandopop
- Language: Mandarin
- Label: BMG, Alfa Music
- Producer: Jay Chou

Jay Chou chronology
Fantasy (2001)	Fantasy Plus (2001)	The Eight Dimensions (2002)

Fantasy Plus (Chinese: 范特西Plus) is the first EP by Taiwanese singer Jay Chou, released on 24 December 2001 by Alfa Music. It features a CD contains three live tracks and a VCD contains thirteen music videos.

== Track listing ==
CD

1. "Snail" (蝸牛) (Original artist: Valen Hsu, Power Station, Panda Hsiung and Chyi Chin)
2. "You're Happier than Before" (你比從前快樂) (Original artist: Jacky Wu)
3. "End of the World" (世界末日) (Original artist: S.B.D.W)

VCD

1. "Love Before the Century" (愛在西元前)
2. "Dad, I've Come Back" (爸，我回來了)
3. "Simple Love" (簡單愛)
4. "Ninja" (忍者)
5. "Couldn't Say" (開不了口)
6. "Shanghai 1943" (上海一九四三)
7. "Sorry" (對不起)
8. "William Castle" (威廉古堡)
9. "Nunchucks" (雙截棍)
10. "Silence" (安靜)
11. "Snail" (蝸牛)
12. "You're Happier than Before" (你比從前快樂)
13. "End of the World" (世界末日)
