= Chosen Few =

(The) Chosen Few may refer to:

== In Music ==
- Boy Wonder "Chosen Few", Dominican American musician, producer and filmmaker

=== Bands ===
- The Chosen Few (reggae group), a Jamaican group
- The Chosen Few, a 1960s rock group from Newcastle, England who evolved into Skip Bifferty
- The Chosen Few (garage rock band), a 1960s Detroit band, whose members included Ron Asheton
- The Chosen Few, a US hardcore punk band formed by members of U.S. Chaos
- The Chosen Few (1970s Australian band), a punk band which formed in 1978
- The Chosen Few (1980's Australian Band), a rock band active between 1985 and 1992
- Chosen Few, Dutch Hardcore DJs / producers team that released gabber classic, "Name Of The DJ"
- The Chosen Few, the band of English singer/songwriter Paul Bonin
- The Chosen Few, the former name of the Faith Band
- Wigan's Chosen Few, credited with the 1975 UK hit "Footsee"

=== Recordings ===
- The Chosen Few (The Dooleys album), 1979, and the title track
- The Chosen Few (Boot Camp Clik album), 2002
- The Chosen Few (Judas Priest album), 2011
- The Chosen Few, a solo album by blues guitarist Mark Flanagan
- "The Chosen Few", a song by the Dropkick Murphys
- "Chosen Few" (song), a single by German thrash metal group Kreator
- "...A Chosen Few," a song on the Electric Wizard album Let Us Prey
- "The Chosen Few" (Electric Wizard song), on the album Witchcult Today

== Other ==
- "The Chosen Few", a 2002 episode of the television series Third Watch
- The Chosen Few MC, a name for a number of outlaw motorcycle clubs
- The Chosen Few (book), The Chosen Few: How Education Shaped Jewish History, 70-1492, 2012, Princeton University Press
- The Chosin Few, American veterans of the Battle of Chosin Reservoir of the Korean War

== See also ==
- The Chosen One (disambiguation)
- Chosen people
