= Adorable Lady =

Single by Jay Chou

from the album Jay
- Language: Mandarin
- Released: November 7, 2000
- Genre: Pop; R&B
- Length: 4:57
- Label: BMG
- Songwriter(s): Vivian Hsu
- Producer(s): Jay Chou

Jay Chou singles chronology
"Adorable Lady" (2000)	"Tornado" (2000)

Music video
- "Adorable Lady" on YouTube

"Adorable Lady" (Chinese: 可愛女人; pinyin: Kě'ài nǚrén) is the debut single by Taiwanese recording artist Jay Chou. It is taken from his debut studio album Jay, which was released through BMG on November 7, 2000. It is a midtempo pop and R&B number with lyrics written by Vivian Hsu and composition and production handled by Chou himself. The song became a hit in Greater China after the album's release and instantaneously put Chou's singing career on the map.

The accompanying music video was directed Kuang Sheng and is solely focused on Chou and Hsu bonding with each other in a dimly lit room. The song was heavily promoted by television shows and radio, and Chou himself appeared on programs to promote the song and its parent album. In 2001, Chou was nominated for the Best Composer Award at the 12th Golden Melody Awards for this song.

== Background and composition ==
"Adorable Lady"
A sample of "Adorable Lady," a pop and R&B ballad that described the fantasies of a lovesick man

In his early years, Jay Chou was still working in the Alfa Music Studio founded by Jacky Wu. Wu invited JR Yang to help him manage the company. When Yang met Chou, he asked him to bring him a demo tape of a song he had written and listen to it. Chou rummaged through a drawer and took out a cassette of “Adorable Lady.” When Yang listened to it, he was captivated by Chou's singing voice and praised him. "Adorable Lady" was the title track of Chou's first full-length album, and he did all the composing, harmonizing and programming by himself. "Adorable Lady“ was originally written to be sung by Wu, who had already written a version of the lyrics called ”Spring, Summer, Autumn and Winter“, but he felt that he couldn't sing it and returned it. It was only after that that the lyrics were filled out as ”Adorable Lady" by Vivian Hsu, and sung by Chou himself.

Musically, "Adorable Lady" is a midtempo pop and R&B ballad. The whole song exhibits a brand new R&B flavor, with simple lyrics but exudes infinite imagination, getting rid of the general ballad style in the market. Lyrically, it depicts a lovesick man fawning over and fantasizing about his lover. "Adorable Lady" is a typical Chou-style R&B song, which is clearly a commercial style, but at that time, such a light and rhythmic style was a new product in the Chinese music scene.

== Music video ==
A screenshot from the song's music video.

The accompanying music video was directed by eminent director Kuang Sheng. The director of the production skillfully arranged for the two of them to have a storyline that would leave room for the audience's imagination.

Vivian Hsu wrote the lyrics for this song and made a guest appearance in the video, thus becoming the heroine of Chou's first hit song music video. Hsu had never filmed a music video for any other artist before, and had been a good friend of Chou's for many years, with the two having collaborated on music several times before. In the course of production, she agreed to play the female lead in "Adorable Lady."This was a very important support for Chou, who was a newcomer at the time. Hsu's move not only greatly increased Jay Chou's popularity, but also increased the attention of Jay Chou's news.

== Live performances ==
Chou performed the song live at the 12th Golden Melody Awards on May 5, 2001.
