= Jay (album) =

2000 studio album by Jay Chou

- Regular edition cover

Studio album by Jay Chou
- Released: 7 November 2000
- Recorded: 2000
- Genre: R&B
- Length: 42:49
- Language: Mandarin
- Label: BMG
- Producer: Jay Chou

Jay Chou chronology
Jay (2000)	Fantasy (2001)

Alternative cover
- CD+VCD cover

Singles from Jay
- 1. "Adorable Lady" Released: 7 November 2000; 2. "Tornado" Released: 7 November 2000; 3. "Starry Mood" Released: 7 November 2000

Jay (traditional Chinese: 杰倫; simplified Chinese: 杰伦; pinyin: Jié lún) is the debut studio album by Taiwanese singer Jay Chou. It was released on 7 November 2000, by BMG Taiwan. It was entirely produced and composed by Chou, with lyrics written by Chou alongside his creative partners Vincent Fang and Vivian Hsu. Musically, the record incorporates popular music genres such as pop, hip-hop, R&B, and adult contemporary.

Jay received highly positive reviews from music critics; it is retrospectively credited for starting a whole new era of C-Pop music and is seen as one of the most impactful albums from Greater China of the 21st century. Commercially, the album was a success, shipping over 250,000 copies in Taiwan, and became the top seller for four consecutive months. It finished as one of the highest-selling albums of 2001 in the country, and is one of the best-selling albums in Taiwan of the 21st century. The album also earned an IFPI Hong Kong Top Sales Music Award for Top 10 Best Selling Mandarin Albums of the Year in 2001.

== Background and development ==
In September 1997, Chou was discovered by Jacky Wu at a talent show and joined Wu's record company Alpha Music as a music production assistant. However, no singer was willing to accept the songs that Chou wrote. In December 1999, Wu told Chou that if he could write 50 songs in 10 days, he would help him select 10 songs to make an album. In the end, Chou completed it as promised. He single-handedly took care of the production, composition, and chorus writing of 10 songs, the arrangement of three songs, and the lyrics of two songs, creating his first album.

In July 2000, Chou showed the demo of "Adorable Lady" to JR Yang. JR Yang praised him and planned an album for him. The lyricism, composition, chorus, and guitar of "Starry Mood" were all done by Chou himself, with the song being submitted to Forward Music before 2000. Huang Shu-Jun, who was signed to Forward Music at the time, felt that the song was very well written and expressed to the company that he wanted to sign a contract with Chou, but when he wanted to use this song later, Chou had already started recording the album Jay.

When Chou created the song "Wife", he improvised a rap, and the words of the rap were extended to a passage in the song. This incident made Vincent Fang very angry. Fang felt that he could write another rap. Chou also insisted that the improvised version was the most perfect. If it was re-recorded, it would lose its original flavor, and Fang had to compromise in the end. "Tornado" was originally a sincere work dedicated to Jacky Wu by Chou when he debuted, but it was withdrawn on the grounds of unsuitability, and finally placed on the LP. Chou asked his colleague and mentor, Hsu, to write the lyrics of "Tornado" for him. He has gone on record saying that Hsu is a lovely woman, very talented, and writes imaginative lyrics that fit his songs. The best place she could be when writing lyrics for Chou was on the airplane; the lyrics to "Tornado" came to her partly on the plane, so she hurriedly wrote them on a sickbag.

== Writing and composition ==
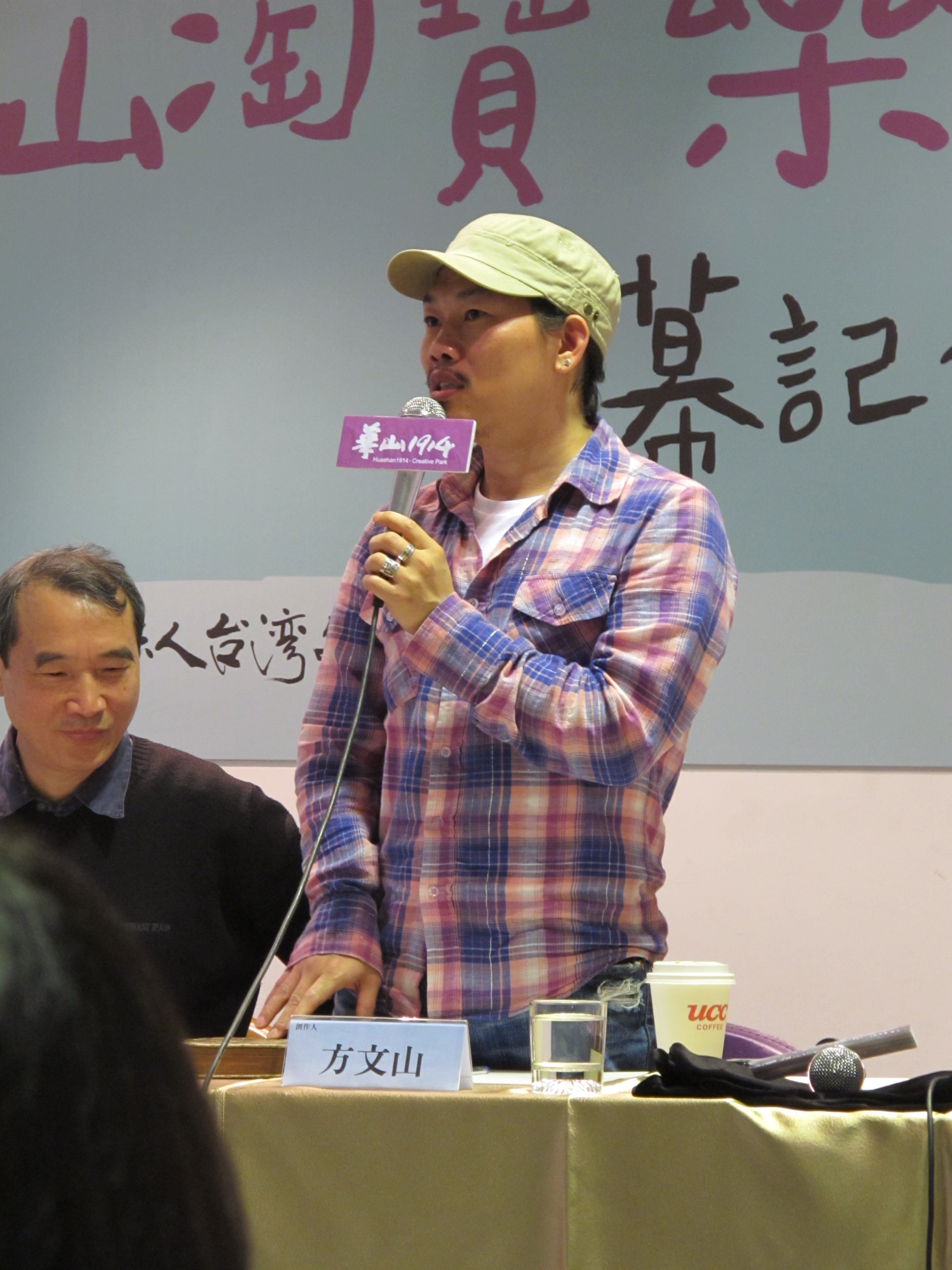
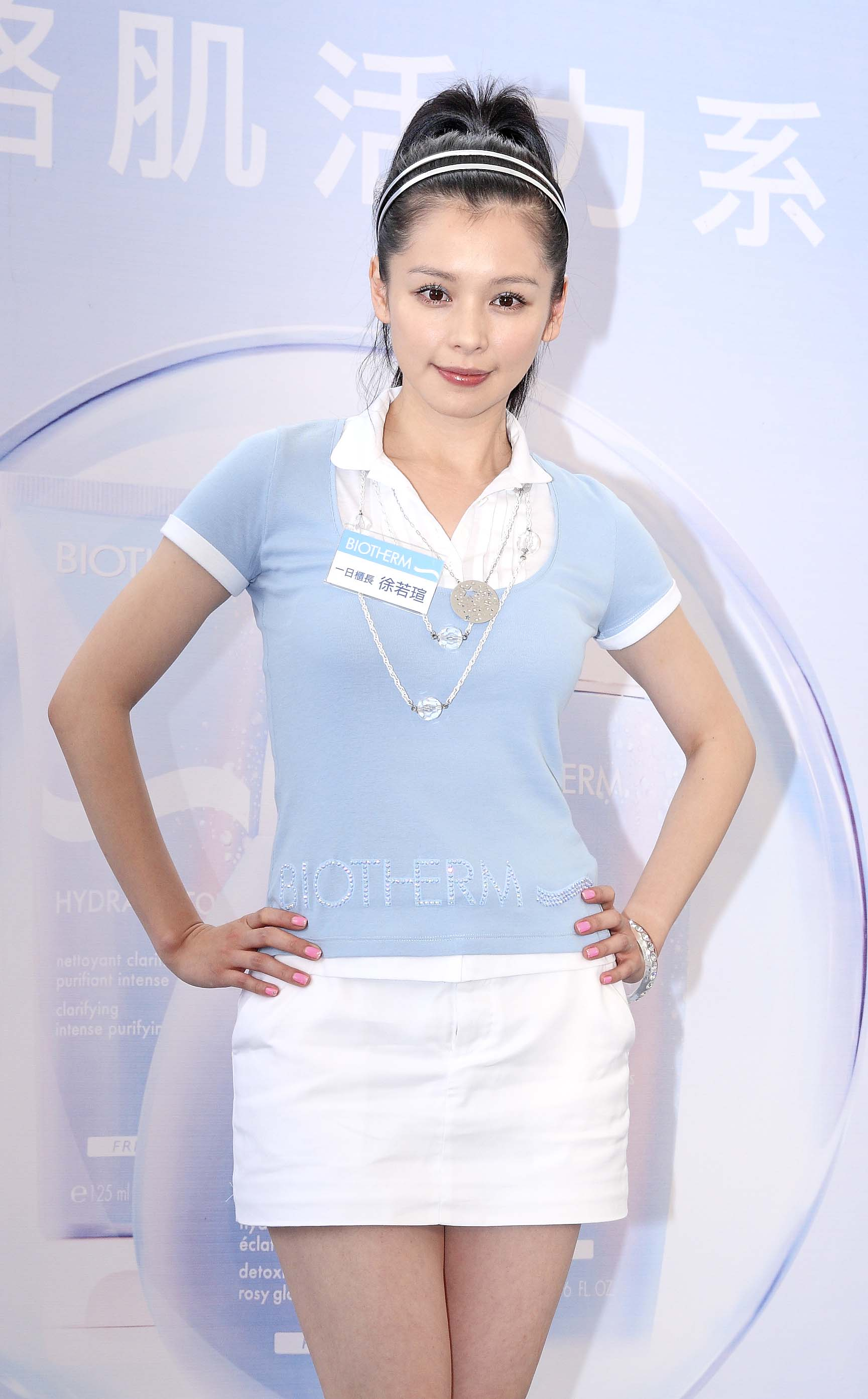
Vincent Fang (left) and Vivian Hsu (right), two of Chou's collaborators on the album

The whole album is based on R&B and hip-hop, with the addition of Baroque strings and bands to create a vintage British style, and in particular, the Spanish style strings in the songs are very similar to that of a movie soundtrack. The album Jay mixes a lot of urban contemporary music styles to shake up the mainstream cornerstones of the Chinese music scene. At the same time, it's a dual-core record with rhythmic dynamics on top of its melodies, re-calibrating the balance of modern songs with rhythms and melodies to give it a fresher and richer appeal of individuality. Chou served as the album's sole composer, while he enlisted Vincent Fang and Vivian Hsu to assist with the songwriting.

The lead single "Adorable Lady" is written and arranged by Chou, with lyrics by Vivian Hsu, and the whole song has an R&B flavor. With simple lyrics that give out infinite space for the imagination, "Adorable Lady" breaks away from the usual ballad style in the Mandopop market, while having a new feel to it. The power ballad "Black Humor" is a deep description of Chou's inner world of emotions, remembering the moment when his girlfriend left him, with a twelve-piece string orchestra and a traditional old-fashioned band, presenting a British vintage flair.

The songs "Perfectionism," "Wife," "Basketball Match," "Ancient Indian Turtledove" and "Counter-Clockwise Clock" were all solely lyricized by Vincent Fang. The lyrics of the song "Perfectionism" depict the perfectionist characteristics of a girl which gave a boy heart-rending regrets of having the painful relationship with her. The lyrics also literally contained Chou's name being repeated over the chorus' tune. In terms of its music production, the song was played with several layers of piano tunes, a vigorous bass, and distinctive synthesizers. "Wife" describes the undying affection of the wife through thick and thin, and contains Chou's iconic mumbling rap style that would be synonymous with him throughout his career. The lyrics to "Basketball Match" describes the scenes during a basketball game along with the singer's hostility towards the opposing team mates who embarrassed him during the basketball match. The song was composed with a slow R&B style, with parts of the song being rapped. The most special thing about "Basketball Match" is that the number's intro was also recorded on the spot at a basketball court.

Hsu wrote the song "Istanbul" for the album when she traveled to Turkey. The song "Ancient Indian Turtledove" was created by Chou after he watched the movie Shanghai Noon. Chou created the song "Ancient Indian Turtledove" with lyrics from "Black Humor" after watching Shanghai Noon, and then took the lyrics from "Black Humor" and let Fang write new lyrics. The song was recorded in an impromptu manner, with the aim of presenting it in the most authentic way possible, while taking influences from acid jazz, which is unorthodox in Chinese popular music. The track "Tornado" is presented in an R&B way, with its break adding extremely conflicting Spanish strings. "Counter-Clockwise Clock" is the closing song on the album Jay, and the only song in the album that doesn't have a Western flavor. The intro and the mother tongue phonetic symbols of the BPM are added, and except for the B section, which has a sonata-like feel with some chord changes, the whole song is completed with 3 chords, and it has an oriental melancholic flavor.

== Release and promotion ==
The first edition of the album is the First Yellow Cover Edition. The second edition is the Second Edition Blue Cover with a Free Calendar Transparent Card. The third edition is in a blue cover and came with a bonus VCD that included seven music videos. The fourth and final edition of the record is the cassette version.

=== Singles and music videos ===
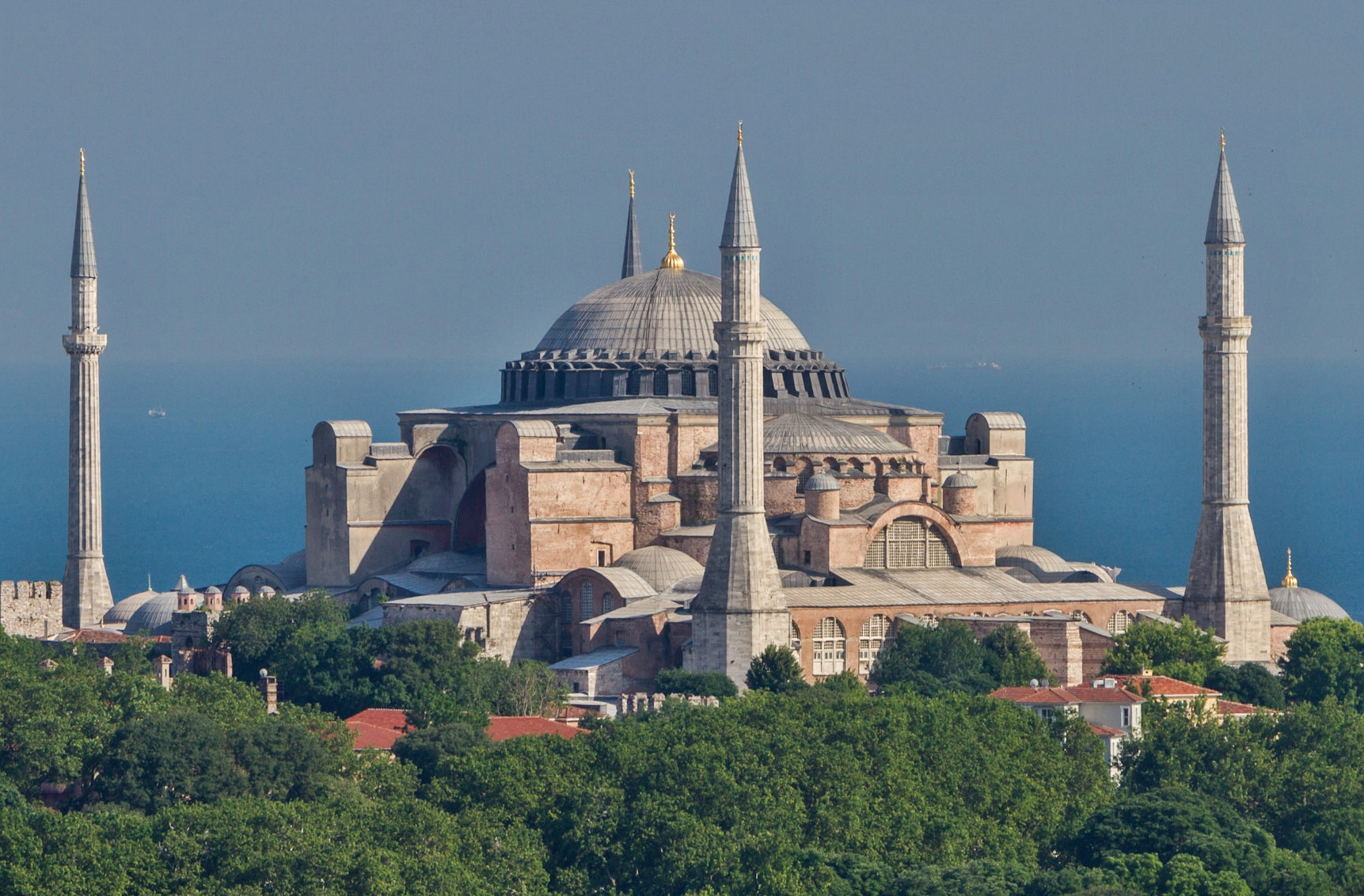
The music video for "Istanbul" depicts scenes in Istanbul, Turkey

The music video for "Adorable Lady" was directed by prolific Taiwanese music video director Kuang Sheng. The female lead in the music video was Vivian Hsu, who had never filmed a music video for any other artist before, and had been a good friend of Chou's for many years, with the two having collaborated on music several times before. In the course of production, she agreed to play the female lead in "Adorable Lady." The director of the production skillfully arranged for the two of them to have a storyline that would leave room for the audience's imagination. The music video for "Perfectionism" was directed by Shockley Huang, which contains scenes of Chou playing piano over a deserted field. The music video for "Starry Mood," which was directed by Huang Xiao Jia, depicts Chou singing in the grassland. The music video for "Wife" was set in a traditional Chinese home, with Chou singing in various parts of the gardens and rooms; it was directed by Kuang Sheng.

Jacky Wu directed the music video for "Basketball Match," which was entirely filmed in a basketball court, underneath a motorway. Kuang Sheng directed the music video for "Black Humor," which was shot in black and white with scenes of Chou lamenting over his love life and shots of a Caucasian lady. The music video for "Istanbul" was directed by Kuang Sheng and it depicts scenes in Istanbul with shots of Chou singing casually. The music video for "Ancient Indian Turtledove" consists of clips from a series of Chou's concert in 2001. The music video for "Tornado" was directed by Kuang Sheng, which portrays scenes of Chou bracing the tornado winds as well as embracing the video's heroine. The music video for "Counter-Clockwise Clock" was directed by Kuang Sheng, and it was shot entirely in a sepia filter, indicating the melancholic atmosphere of the lyrics as well as the melodies.

In January 2001, "Adorable Lady", was listed at number 74 on the 2000 Hit FM Top 100 Singles of the Year chart. In January 2002, "Starry Mood" was listed at number 80 on the 2001 edition of the chart.

== Reception ==
Professional ratings
Review scores
Source	Rating
MTVChinese.com	4/5 stars

Jay received highly positive reviews from contemporary music critics. A reviewer MTVChinese.com awarded the album four out of five stars and stated that the album can be said to be one of the most eye-catching albums in the recent Mandarin market. The reviewer capped off the review by saying: "I particularly recommend the non-title songs in the album. I believe you will have more interesting new discoveries about Jay Chou." A reviewer from NetEase stated: "Although Jay Chou's style has the shadow of David Tao and Alex To, after all, the singer's first album will inevitably give people a feeling of "copying". As long as Jay makes some adjustments to his own music style, he may become a role model for other new singers." At the end of the review, they said: "I really think Jay Chou has great potential, and let us see what outstanding performance Jay will have in 2001!" An editor from Apple Music Taiwan said that the album was bursting with infinite novel musical elements.

The website Hypebeast did a retrospective of the album 20 years after its debut and minutely went over how much impact it had on the Mandopop scene by buoying genres like hip hop, R&B and rap music in the mainstream. Eric and Bakery Kung of GQ Taiwan wrote in a retrospective review: "Even after 20 years, when I listen to Jay Chou's first album again, no matter whether it's a new and different style of music, or the lyrics of Fong and Tsui, under the chaotic market of Chinese music, the melody is still new and trendy, so the creation is no longer limited to the market of love songs, and develops the colorful and strange without any boundaries, leaving behind countless Jay's classics, and becoming the representative masterpieces of the watershed that can't be forgotten."

== Accolades ==
The album was nominated for five Golden Melody Awards and won for Best Pop Vocal Album. The album also won an IFPI Hong Kong Top Sales Music Award for Top 10 Best Selling Mandarin Albums of the Year. On 18 January 2002, "Starry Mood" won the "Outstanding Mandarin Song Award" gold award at the Top Ten Chinese Gold Songs Awards. "Black Humor" won one of the Top Ten Chinese Golden Songs at the 1st Malaysian Golden Melody Awards Ceremony, where he also won the Best Composer Award. "Ancient Indian Turtledove" made it onto the leaderboard of the top ten outstanding singles in 2000 by the Taiwan Chinese Musicians Exchange Association. "Tornado" won the 2001 Metro Karaoke Song Award at the 2001 Metro Music Awards.

== Track listing ==
All music is composed by Jay Chou.

No.	Title	Lyrics	Length
1.	"Adorable Lady" (可愛女人)	Vivian Hsu	3:56
2.	"Perfectionism" (完美主義)	Vincent Fang	4:01
3.	"Starry Mood" (星晴)	Jay Chou	4:16
4.	"Wife" (娘子)	Vincent Fang	4:28
5.	"Basketball Match" (鬥牛)	Vincent Fang	4:36
6.	"Black Humor" (黑色幽默)	Jay Chou	4:40
7.	"Istanbul" (伊斯坦堡)	Vivian Hsu	3:26
8.	"Ancient Indian Turtledove" (印地安老斑鳩)	Vincent Fang	5:02
9.	"Tornado" (龍捲風)	Vivian Hsu	4:08
10.	"Counter-Clockwise Clock" (反方向的鐘)	Vincent Fang	4:16
Total length:			42:49

== Sales and certifications ==
Region	Certification	Certified units/sales
Hong Kong	—	100,000
Singapore (RIAS)	Gold	5,000^{*}
Taiwan	—	250,000
^{*} Sales figures based on certification alone.
