= Fue =

Fue or FUE may refer to:

== People ==
- Masato Fue (born 1973), Japanese footballer
- Fue Lee (born 1991), American politician

== Places ==
- French University of Egypt, El Shorouk, Cairo
- Future University in Egypt, New Cairo
- Fuerteventura Airport, Canary Islands, Spain (IATA:FUE)

== Other uses ==
- Fue (flute), a Japanese musical instrument
- Follicular unit extraction, in medicine
- A Samoan fly-whisk
- Borgu Fulfulde, spoken in West Africa (ISO 639-3:fue)

== See also ==
- Few (disambiguation)
