= Fantasy (Jay Chou album) =

Studio album by Jay Chou
- Released: 14 September 2001
- Recorded: 2001
- Genre: Mandopop
- Length: 39:30
- Language: Mandarin
- Label: BMG; Alfa
- Producer: Jay Chou

Jay Chou chronology
Jay (2000)	Fantasy (2001)	Fantasy Plus (2001)

Singles from Fantasy
- 1. "Simple Love" Released: 14 September 2001; 2. "Silence" Released: 14 September 2001; 3. "I Find it Hard to Say" Released: 14 September 2001

Fantasy (Chinese: 范特西; pinyin: Fàn tè xī) is the second studio album by Taiwanese singer Jay Chou. It was released on 14 September 2001, by BMG Taiwan. Akin to his debut record, Fantasy was entirely composed and produced by Chou himself, while the lyrics were penned by him along with Vincent Fang and Vivian Hsu. Fantasy not only breaks new ground in Chou's production standards, but also matures in its creation. The album not only includes lyrical R&B songs, but also broadens his horizons to include other styles such as hip-hop, rock, rap and traditional Japanese music.

Fantasy received generally positive reviews from music critics, who complimented the album's production and praised the mixture of musical genres. Commercially, the album attained huge success in Greater China. The album sold over 460,000 copies in Taiwan, making it the country's best-selling album of 2001, as well as the fourth best-selling album in Taiwan of the 21st century. Fantasy is also credited for helping Chou buoy his popularity across the mainland China. The album has since sold over 1.7 million copies throughout Asia overall. Chou promoted the album by embarking on the Fantasy Tour, which ran from November 2001 to February 2002.

== Background ==
On 7 November 2000, Chou released his debut album, Jay, which sold more than 250,000 copies in Taiwan. The album was a groundbreaking release, combining R&B, hip-hop, classical and Chinese style; which established Chou's image as a "Chou-esque" singer. After the success of his first solo album, Chou faced pressure from all sides but continued to do his own thing and produced the album Fantasy. In addition to producing and editing music albums for himself, Chou had also started composing music for other well-known singers such as S.H.E, Jordan Chan, Landy Wen, Jolin Tsai, Andy Lau, among others.

In 2000, Vivian Hsu's studio album Jiaban de Tianshi, which she devoted herself to creating, was a commercial failure, and she fell into a deep depression as a result. At this time, Chou, who was just starting out, listened carefully to Hsu's album and decided to invite her to compose songs for him. Therefore, Hsu wrote the lyrics for three songs for him, including "Simple Love."

== Development and production ==
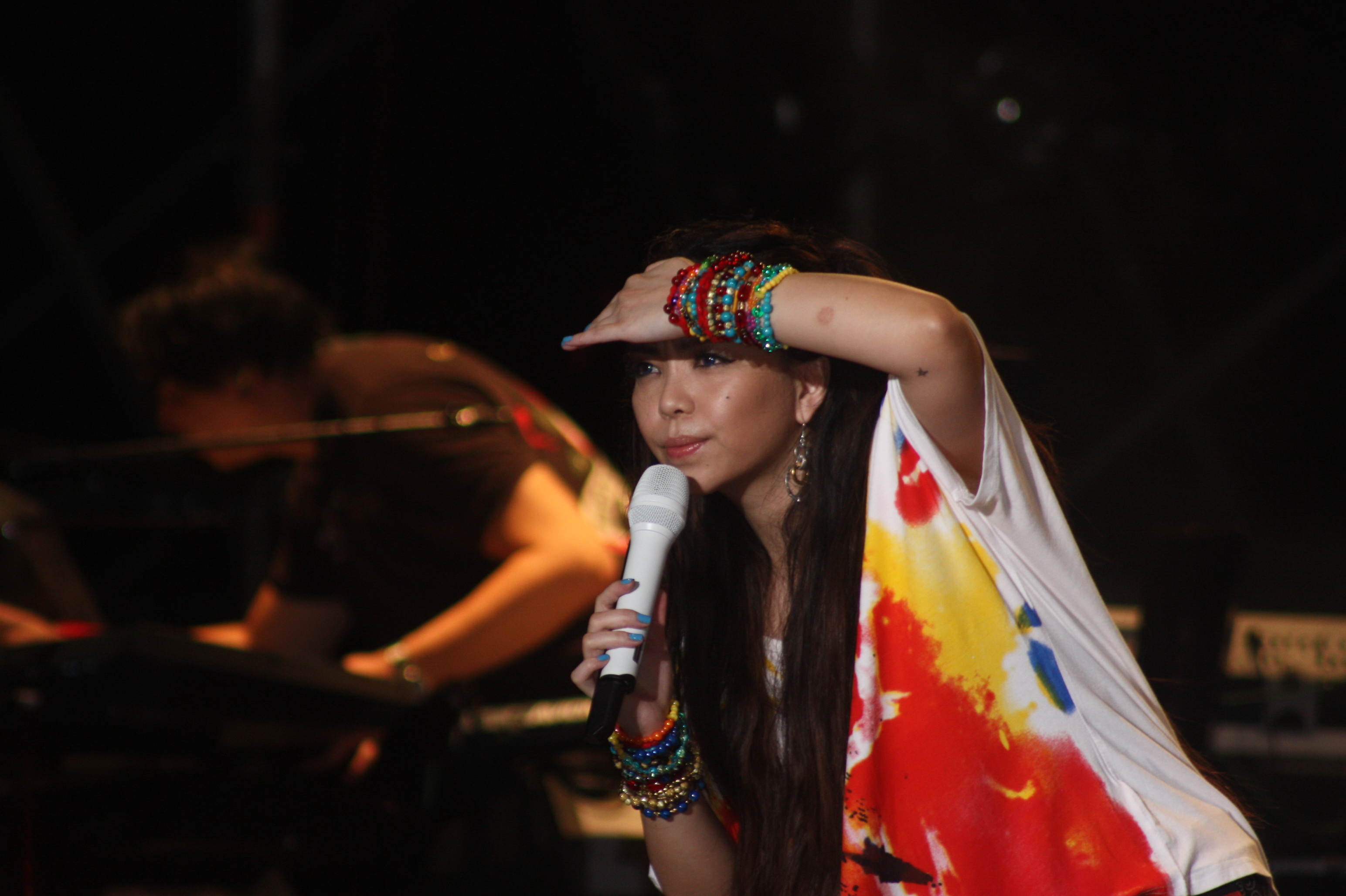
The song "Ninja" was originally written for A-Mei (pictured in 2011), but she rejected it

The album Fantasy is produced by Chou, with all the ten songs composed by him. For lyrics, Chou is responsible for two of the songs, while the rest of the lyrics are written by Vincent Fang and Vivian Hsu respectively. During the creative process of Fantasy, Chou put various creative ideas such as nostalgia, love, domestic violence, and martial arts into the songs. The record company also attached great importance to this album; not only did they make music videos for all ten songs in the album, but they also promoted it extensively across the country and even across Asia, hoping to push Chou's music to a new peak. Chou was personally very worried that the album's performance would not be as good as he had hoped; therefore, he was under a lot of pressure.

The song "Dad, I'm Home" was originally intended to be sung by Kang Kang. Chou and Fang originally decided on the song title "Slap My Girl," but when it was submitted to Jacky Wu, it was rejected. Later, it was written as "Dad, I'm Home" and given to Kang Kang to sing, who thought it sounded weird and difficult to sing, and rejected it again. In the end, Chou had to sing it himself. When Chou debuted, he wrote "Ninja" for A-Mei, but she rejected it because of his "rapid" rap. Some of the simple Japanese words in the song were learned by Chou after watching Japanese television dramas without asking a teacher to teach him. During the production of the album, Chou changed the title of the song "I Find It Hard To Say" without telling Hsu in advance.

When Chou was working on the demo for the track "William Castle," he had already thought of using vampires as the theme of the song. Chou then told the story to Fang, who then searched for information and discussed it with Chou, eventually forming the lyrics of the song. In terms of composition, Chou came up with the idea of using MIDI to make a pipe organ when he was working on the demo of "William Castle," and added sound effects such as the sound of horses' hooves to the intro.

== Composition and content ==
"Love Before BC" is a pop and R&B song written by Chou after a trip to a museum, and was based on the story of Nebuchadnezzar II, the king of Babylon, and his wife Amytis. "Dad, I'm Home" is a song about domestic violence penned solely by Chou after hearing about his friend's experience. "Simple Love" is a representation of rhythmic love songs, with a simple arrangement featuring Spanish guitar plucking and percussion that creates a picture of puppy love. "Ninja" is sung in Chou's typical style—not emphasizing on the words, but focusing on the music, and the mysterious oriental music, portraying the image of a ninja. This is another one of Chou's songs that incorporates oriental music after the song "Wife" on his debut album.

"I Find it Hard to Say" adds a heavier rhythm into its R&B framework, combined with a smooth rap and a classical prelude. The song "Shanghai 1943" is based on the story of a Taiwanese veteran who misses his parents. The song "Sorry" describes Chou's saudades, his deep feelings for the past, and his apologies, which indicates his cherishing of his previous relationships, and therefore wants to say "sorry." The song "William Castle" is a British style song that adds classical baroque string accompaniment and a band into the creation. The rap at the end of the song comes from the lyrics of the song "Basketball Match," which was added live by Chou during his final recording. The style of the track "Nunchucks" is a mix of rock and roll with a rapid-fire rap. Chou created the power ballad "Silence" based on his own experiences growing up; he learned to play the piano at a young age, playing quietly in a secluded corner surrounded by silence with only the piano to keep him company, so he skillfully blended his growing up experience with his first love experience to create the song.

== Title and artwork ==
The title of the album comes from the transliteration of the English word "Fantasy." The reason why the album is titled "Fantasy" is because Chou wanted to use music to bring people a whimsical imagination, and the name "Fantasy" also reflected Chou's consistent music philosophy—music is fantasy, fantasy is happy. The album cover is a close up of Chou's face while he's wearing a red hoodie.

== Release and promotion ==
To promote Fantasy, Chou embarked on his first very concert tour titled Fantasy Tour, which had five stops in total. The first stop was at Taoyuan where he performed at the Taoyuan Arena on 3 November 2001. At the Taoyuan Arena show, Coco Lee performed as his special guest as they performed "Dow Ma Dan" together. The second and third shows were played at the Hong Kong Coliseum in Hong Kong on 5 November 2001, and 6 November 2001. The fourth show was played in Kuala Lumpur, Malaysia at the Axiata Arena on 8 February 2002. The final stop of the show was played in Singapore at Suntec City on 10 February 2002.

=== Singles and music videos ===
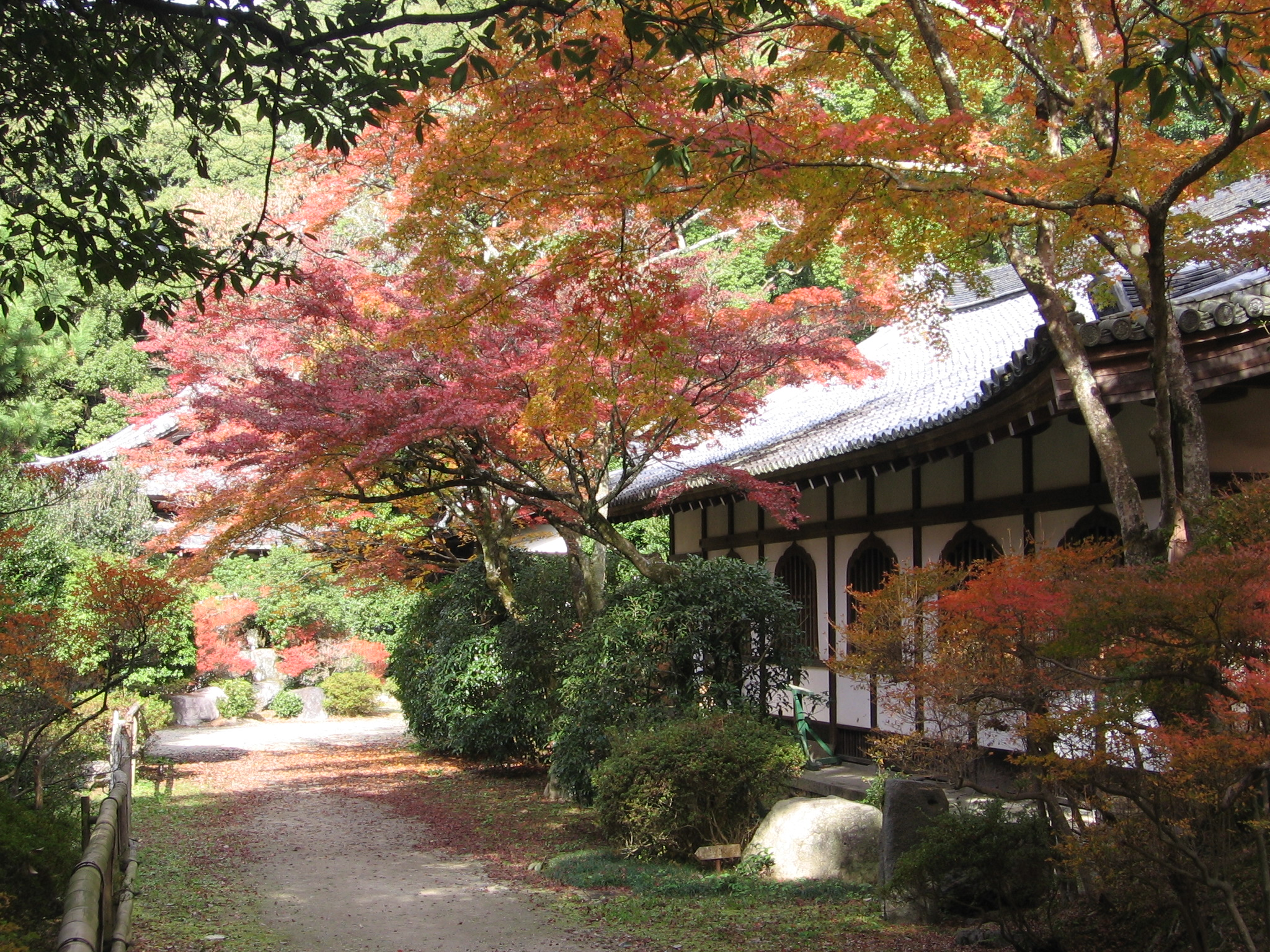
The music video for "Ninja" was filmed in a Japanese garden

The music video for "Love Before BC," which was directed by Kuang Sheng, depicts scenes of ancient ruins in sepia filter. The music video for "Dad, I'm Home" was directed by Jeff and was shot in an abandoned house, with the opening scene showing Chou playing the cello. Shockley Huang directed the music video for "Simple Love," which tells a pure and shy love story. The heroine in the music video of "Simple Love" is Miyu Furukawa, a model for Japan's Non-no magazine, who was only 13 or 14 years old at the time. The music video for "Ninja" was directed by Huang and features Chou in his iconic red hoodie rapping in a traditional Japanese garden with scenes of ninjas acrobatically jumping around. Kuang Sheng directed the music video for "I Find It Hard To Say", which is inspired by the movie Ghost (1990); it features Chou crashing from a spacecraft, reincarnating as another person while pondering upon his love interest who didn't seem to recognize him.

Kuang Sheng directed the music video for "Shanghai 1943"; it portrays scenes of Chou singing against the backdrop of the bustling Shanghai streets during the 1940s. The video for "Sorry" used edited concert footage instead of actually having a storyline. The music video for "William Castle" also contains footage of Chou's concert as well as him singing casually. The music video of the song "Nunchucks" was directed by Kuang Sheng; it tells the story of a man who is strong in martial arts, who fights for justice and teaches people not to use force, and that force is not the only way to solve things. The music video for "Silence" was directed by Shockley Huang. When filming the video, Chou quietly played the piano, sometimes pacing quietly, from early morning to sunset. The piano accompanied him through the night. At times, he closed his eyes with deep emotion and walked with bare feet, his past love just like the scenery outside his window. At the end of the "Silence" video, Chou puts on his suit and runs out of the door, drenched in the rain, seemingly telling himself to get out of the love that is hard to part with. In January 2002, the tracks "Simple Love" and "I Find It Hard to Say" were listed at number 2 and number 17 respectively on the 2001 Hit FM Top 100 Singles of the Year chart.

== Reception ==
Professional ratings
Review scores
Source	Rating
MTVChinese.com	3.5/5 stars

Leo Liu of MTVChinese.com awarded the album three and a half stars out of five. He stated that even though the melodies were good and the talent was inevitable, there was something lacking. He stated at the end: "Overall, it is a pity that the quality is not as neat and smooth as the previous one. In addition, the 'recording technology' problem was pointed out by the golden song judges in the previous album, but the feeling remains the same in this album. Too much computer midi makes people feel unrealistic. I hope the next album can be improved."

Eric of GQ Taiwan stated in a retrospective review: "Even after 15 years, when I listen to "Fantasy" again and again, I will still be moved by the avant-garde melody. Both the lyrics and music are quite trendy. Who would have thought that the boy in the red hat T-shirt on the album cover still dominates the entire Chinese pop music circle." In 2020, to celebrate Chou's 20th anniversary in the industry, NetEase conducted a ranking of Chou's best albums; Fantasy won first place on the list. Tencent Music's Wave Review Panel ranked Fantasy first place in their list of the "200 Best Chinese Albums of 2001–2020": they praised Chou's work on the record for using R&B and hip-hop elements brilliantly, while also appreciating Vincent Fang's imaginative lyrics.

== Accolades ==
The album received ten nominations at the 13th Golden Melody Awards and won five awards, including Album of the Year, Best Album Producer, and Best Composer. The album also won for an IFPI Hong Kong Top Sales Music Award for Top 10 Best Selling Mandarin Albums of the Year. In 2008, "Love Before BC" was selected by Southern Weekly as one of the Top Ten Classic Songs in the Thirty Years of Reform and Opening Up. In 2002, "Simple Love" made it onto the leaderboard of the "Top Ten Outstanding Golden Songs of the Year" at the TOP Chinese Music ceremony. "I Find it Hard to Say" won the Gold Award for the Most Popular Mandarin Song at the Top Ten Golden Songs Awards and the Top Ten Chinese Songs at the Second Chinese Pop Music Media Awards. "Silence" won the Best Golden Song Award at the 2nd Global Chinese Music Awards Ceremony.

== Track listing ==
All music is composed by Jay Chou.

No.	Title	Lyrics	Length
1.	"Love Before BC" (愛在西元前)	Vincent Fang	3:54
2.	"Dad, I'm Home" (爸，我回來了)	Jay Chou	3:55
3.	"Simple Love" (簡單愛)	Vivian Hsu	4:31
4.	"Ninja" (忍者)	Vincent Fang	2:38
5.	"I Find it Hard to Say" (開不了口)	Vivian Hsu	4:44
6.	"Shanghai 1943" (上海一九四三)	Vincent Fang	3:15
7.	"Sorry" (對不起)	Vincent Fang	3:45
8.	"William Castle" (威廉古堡)	Vincent Fang	3:56
9.	"Nunchucks" (雙截棍)	Vincent Fang	3:21
10.	"Silence" (安靜)	Jay Chou	5:34
Total length:			39:30

== Charts ==
=== Weekly charts ===
Chart (2001)	Peak position
Malaysian Albums (RIM)	4
Singaporean Albums (RIAS)	1

=== Year-end charts ===
Chart (2001)	Position
Taiwanese Albums (Note: Best-selling albums of the year in Taiwan as reported by media outlets)	1

== Sales and certifications ==
Region	Certification	Certified units/sales
Hong Kong	—	100,000
Taiwan	—	460,000
Summaries
Asia	—	1,700,000
