= The One That Got Away =

The One That Got Away may refer to:

== Film and television ==
- The One That Got Away (1957 film), about Franz von Werra
- The One That Got Away (1964 film), an Australian TV film
- The One That Got Away (1996 film), an ITV television film adaptation of the Chris Ryan book
- The One That Got Away (Philippine TV series), a 2018 drama series aired on GMA Network
- The One That Got Away (American TV series), a 2022 dating reality television series
- The One That Got Away (British TV series), a 2025 British crime drama, set in Wales
- "The One That Got Away" (American Dad!), an episode of the television show
- "The One That Got Away" (Modern Family), an episode of the television show
- "The One That Got Away" (NYPD Blue), an episode of the television show
- "The One That Got Away" (Touched by an Angel episode), 1996
- "The One That Got Away!", an episode of the television show The Raccoons
- "The One That Got Away", an episode of the television show Little Bear

== Literature ==
- The One That Got Away (book), a 1995 book written under the pseudonym 'Chris Ryan' about the Gulf War
- The One That Got Away, a 1956 book by James Leasor about Franz von Werra
- The One That Got Away, a 2008 collection of short stories by Zoë Wicomb, set in Cape Town and Glasgow
- The Ones that Got Away, a 2011 book by Stephen Graham Jones

== Music ==
=== Albums ===
- The One That Got Away (album), a 1993 album by Thin White Rope

=== Songs ===
- "The One That Got Away" (Natasha Bedingfield song), 2006
- "The One That Got Away" (Katy Perry song), 2011
- "The One That Got Away" (Jake Owen song), 2012
- "The One That Got Away", a 1976 song by Tom Waits from his album Small Change
- "The One That Got Away", a 1984 song by Al Stewart from his album Russians & Americans
- "The One That Got Away", a 1990 song by John Gorka from his album Land of the Bottom Line
- "The One That Got Away", a 1990 song by Little River Band from their album Get Lucky
- "The One That Got Away", a 2006 song by Pink from her album I'm Not Dead
- "The One That Got Away", a 2011 song by April Smith & The Great Picture Show from their album Songs for a Sinking Ship
- "The One That Got Away", a 2013 song by The Civil Wars from their album The Civil Wars
- "The One That Got Away", a 2023 song by Hunter Hayes from his album Red Sky

== See also ==
- "One That Got Away", a song by Michael Ray
- "The Man That Got Away", a torch song published in 1953, sung by Judy Garland in the 1954 film A Star Is Born
