= New Messiah =

New Messiah may refer to

== People ==
- a new Messiah
- David Koresh
- "New Messiah Stage 3", from Japanese game Castlevania: The Adventure ReBirth

== Music ==
- New Messiah (Fear Factory song)
- "New Messiah", single by Strange Nature
- "A New Messiah", song by Diamond Head (band)
- "Maybe I'm The New Messiah", a song by Deadguy
- "A New Messiah", a song by Black Messiah from the album Oath of a Warrior
- "New Messiah" a song by The Philosopher Kings, from the album Famous, Rich and Beautiful 1997
- "The New Messiah", a song by Swedish band The Soundtrack of Our Lives from the album A Present from the Past
- "The New Messiah", a 1985 12″ EP by The Bomb Party
- "New Messiah", a 1986 song by Secession remixed by Zeus B. Held
- "New Messiah", a song from Frida Hyvönen Gives You: Music from the Dance Performance PUDEL
