= The Great One =

The Great One may refer to:

== People ==
- Alberto Contador (born 1982), Spanish professional cyclist
- Roberto Clemente (1934–1972), Hall of Fame Major League Baseball player
- Jackie Gleason (1916–1987), American comedian and actor
- Wayne Gretzky (born 1961), Canadian ice hockey player
- Stephen Hendry (born 1969), Scottish professional snooker player
- Dwayne Johnson (born 1972), also known as The Rock, actor and professional wrestler
- Rob Leatham (born 1961), professional shooter and 16-time USPSA national champion
- Mark Levin (born 1957), conservative radio talk show host
- Bob Maher, Jr. (born 1978), American professional Magic: The Gathering player

== Literature ==
- Great Ones, fictional characters from H. P. Lovecraft's Dreamlands
- The leader of the spiders in the Doctor Who story Planet of the Spiders

== Other uses ==
- The Babylonian name for the constellation Aquarius
- The English translation of the Dena'ina name Denali, a mountain in Denali Park, Alaska

== See also ==
- The Next One (ice hockey)
- List of people known as The Great
