= Savage Messiah =

Savage Messiah may refer to:

- Savage Messiah (1972 film), a 1972 British biographical film
- Savage Messiah (2002 film), a 2002 Canadian drama film
- Savage Messiah (band), an English thrash/heavy metal band
- Savage Messiah (novel), a 2005 novel by Robert Newcomb
- Savage Messiah, a zine and blog by the British artist Laura Oldfield Ford
