= Dark Messiah =

Dark Messiah may refer to:

== Arts and entertainment ==
- Dark Messiah of Might and Magic, a 2006 video game
- Hellnight, or Dark Messiah, a 1998 video game
- Dark Messiah, a Marvel Comics character
- Dark Messiah, a 1990 novel by Martin Caidin

== Religion ==
- Armilus, a figure in Jewish eschatology
- Antichrist, a figure in Christian eschatology
- Al-Masih ad-Dajjal, a figure in Islamic eschatology
