= The One Concert =

Live album by Jay Chou
- Released: 21 October 2002
- Recorded: 28 September 2002
- Venue: Taipei Municipal Stadium
- Genre: Mandopop
- Language: Mandarin
- Label: BMG, Alfa Music

Jay Chou chronology
| The Eight Dimensions (2002) | The One Concert (2002) | Yeh Hui-Mei (2003) |

The One Concert (traditional Chinese: The One演唱會; simplified Chinese: The One演唱会) is the first live album by Taiwanese singer Jay Chou, released on 21 October 2002 by BMG Taiwan and included a date filmed at Taipei Municipal Stadium on 28 September 2002 from The One Concert.

== Track listing ==
1. "Nunchucks" (雙截棍) – 4:13
2. "Half-Beast Human" (半獸人) - 4:30
3. "Ninja" (忍者) – 2:53
4. "Grandpa's Tea" (爺爺泡的茶) – 4:47
5. "Secret Signal" (暗號) – 4:51
6. "Love Before the Century" (愛在西元前) – 4:19
7. "Iron Box of an Island" (半島鐵盒) – 6:13
8. "Back to the Past" (回到過去) – 4:11
9. "Basketball Match" (鬥牛) – 4:45
10. "Split" (分裂) – 4:35
11. "Silence" (安靜) – 4:53
12. "Black Humor" (黑色幽默) – 4:52
13. "Find Myself" (找自己) – 3:43
14. "Tornado" (龍捲風) – 4:11
15. "Starry Mood" (星晴) – 4:21
16. "Dragon Fist" (龍拳) – 4:13
17. "Shanghai 1943" (上海一九四三) – 3:31
18. "Can't Speak Clearly" (你怎麼連話都說不清楚) – 4:06
19. "The Final Battle" (最後的戰役) – 4:25
20. "Simple Love" (簡單愛) – 4:35
21. "Couldn't Say" (開不了口) – 9:19

Bonus MVs:

1. "Half-Beast Human" (半獸人)
2. "Iron Box of an Island" (半島鐵盒)
3. "Secret Signal" (暗號)
4. "Dragon Fist" (龍拳)
5. "Where's the Train Going?" (火車叨位去)
6. "Split" (分裂)
7. "Grandpa's Tea" (爺爺泡的茶)
8. "Back to the Past" (回到過去)
9. "Little Blacksmith in Milan" (米蘭的小鐵匠)
10. "The Final Battle" (最後的戰役)
