= French Engineering Works =

South African tool manufacturer

French Engineering Works logo

The French Engineering Works, or FEW, is a manufacturer, exporter and importer of High Speed Steel cutting tools. The firm was founded in Johannesburg, South Africa, in 1918 by Herman Moser to manufacture rock drill spares for the mining industry in Johannesburg.

The business diversified into manufacture of precision tools, and HSS cutting tools for the metal industry. Their product range includes taps, dies, bits, cutters, toolbits, and thread-rolling dies (flat and circular).
