= The Chosen Few (book) =

2012 book by Zvi Eckstein and Maristella Botticini

The Chosen Few: How Education Shaped Jewish History, 70-1492
- Author: Zvi Eckstein and Maristella Botticini
- Language: English
- Genre: Non-fiction
- Publisher: Princeton University Press
- Publication date: 2012
- Publication place: United States

The Chosen Few: How Education Shaped Jewish History, 70-1492 is a 2012 book by Zvi Eckstein and Maristella Botticini. It won the 2012 National Jewish Book Award.

The book proposes theories about three economic aspects of Jewish history: the transition from agriculture to trade and other urban professions, the creation of the Jewish diaspora, and the decline of Jewish population particularly after the destruction of the Second Temple in 70 CE until the 7th century.

It has been translated to Italian and Hebrew, and was published by Tel Aviv University Press in 2013. As of 2014, the book is being translated to Spanish, Vietnamese, Polish, Chinese and French.

== Overview ==
Cristiana Facchini of the Università di Bologna, describes the book as arguing that in the late Roman period Judaism was unique because it enforced "a communal regulation" to teach children Torah, with the result that Jews became a uniquely literate group. The Authors then apply modern choice analysis and economic behavior theory, and, in particular, the literature on religious affiliation as a matter of choice in an open market of ideas in which many options are available, portraying Jewish parents in the 1st through 7th centuries as being required to make an expensive choice to forgo the labor of children on the farm and, instead, pay tuition for an education that conferred no economic advantage in a community of peasant farmers. Many, according to Botticini and Eckstein, chose Christianity, resulting in the demographic decline of the Jewish community.

Botticini and Eckstein next theorize that the rise of Islam offered new opportunities in trade and craft production, reinforcing literacy among Jews, 70% of whom lived under Muslim governments in the Middle Ages. In Chapters 7 and 8, Botticini and Eckstein argue that the Jewish diaspora spread as Jews sought commercial opportunities in far off places, and were invited to settle by European rulers who sought their expertise in commerce, craft production and as physicians. In Cristiana Facchini words, this is The Chosen Few's "Grand Narrative," "literacy and economic performances. An inadvertent revolution was launched by rabbis in the midst of a great trauma (the fall of the temple and of the Jewish kingdom) leading to "compulsory religious education of male children," and thence, ultimately, to specialization in commerce and banking.

Botticini and Eckstein then ask why and how Jews came to specialize in money-lending, and answer, " “We show that the entry and then specialization of the Jews in lending money at interest can be explained by their comparative advantage in the four assets that were and still are the pillars of the financial intermediation: capital, networking, literacy and numeracy, and contract enforcement institutions.”

== Reception ==
Reception in the popular press was enthusiastic.

Reviews by economists have been mixed. Carmel U. Chiswick called the book, "a very convincing Cliometric analysis that we can expect to inform all future economic histories of the Jews."

Writing in The Journal of Economic History, Philip Ackerman-Lieberman points out that Botticini and Eckstein support their theoretical model with, "assumptions about the historical record which are by no means warranted. Their assumption that classical rabbinic texts can be read as accurate depictions of historical reality leads them to the conclusion that literacy and contract enforcement were universal Jewish institutions. The evidence for either of these is thin at best—and, indeed, the work of Catherine Heszer in antiquity and Avner Greif in the medieval period suggests that these were anything but what Botticini and Eckstein imagine!" Furthermore, according to Ackerman-Lieberman, "Their reading of both the primary sources and the secondary literature on Jewish demography is also tendentious, rejecting more recent advances in scholarship and rereading medieval travelogues in the service of their historical narrative."

Some historians have been scathing. Robert Chazan, writing in The American Historical Review, described Chosen Few as "fashion(ing) a series of significant distortions." For Chazan, "the first major flaw in the book," is that the authors propose "one unified explanation" for the Jewish absence from farming and participation in banking, when, in fact these were a, "protracted and complex set of historical developments," taking place "over many centuries and in multiple venues," which, "cannot be clarified by one simple explanation." The availability of schooling to rural Jewish families in the 3rd to 6th is central to Botticcini and Eckstein's argument, but, according to Chazen, "There is no authority on late antique Judaism who would subscribe to the authors' portrayal of the evolution of Judaism during that period... That rabbis had the authority to erect the kind of perfected schooling system described in this book is—given the current state of research—unthinkable." Chazan calls their assessment of rabbinic sources, "incorrect." Writing in GeneWatch, Diana Muir and Paul Appelbaum question whether the late Roman era "selection event" in which Botticini and Eckstein claim that Jews who chose not to educate their children converted to Christianity "ever occurred," describing Botticini and Eckstein's reliance on population numbers not supported by the sources they cite, or by scholarship.
