= The Anointed One =

The Anointed One or The Anointed may refer to:

- The Messiah, a savior and liberator in Abrahamic religions
  - The Messiah in Judaism
  - The Christ (title), the Messiah in Christianity
  - The Masih (title), the Messiah in Islam
- The anointed, a group of Christians, according to the beliefs of Jehovah's Witnesses
- Anointed One (Buffy the Vampire Slayer), a character in the television series Buffy the Vampire Slayer
- "The Anointed One" (song), a 2003 song by Ted Leo and the Pharmacists
- The Anointed, a 1937 novel by Clyde Brion Davis
- The Anointed One: An Inside Look At Nevada Politics, a 2000 book by Jon Ralston

== See also ==
- Anointing, the ritual act of putting aromatic oil on a person
