= Hipnosis (Cuban band) =

Rock band from Cuba

- Origin: Marianao, La Habana, Cuba
- Genres: Heavy metal; death metal; power metal; thrash metal; gothic metal
- Years active: 2001–present
- Labels: EGREM
- Members: Fanny Tachín; Giovanny Milhet; Raymond Rodriguez; Alain Candia; Indira Labanino

Hipnosis is a rock band from Marianao, La Habana, Cuba. Formed in 2001, the band rose to national fame in 2004 with its debut video, The Chosen One. Hipnosis fuses varied influences taken from heavy metal, thrash, doom and grunge styles. They arrived in the United States on July 21, 2013 and requested political asylum. They now reside in Pembroke Pines, FL.

== Band history ==
Hipnosis began in 2001, bringing together young people with different musical influences including types of metal such as Heavy Metal, Death Metal, Power Metal, Thrash Metal and Gothic Metal.

After being selected in 2003 as the best novel group in a poll promoted by the television program Cuerda Viva, they produced the album The Chosen One (2004), which was nominated by Cubadisco 2005 in the Rock and Opera Prima categories. Giovany Milhet is the composer of all the songs on the album. There follow-up album, Revelation, won the Cuba Disco Award for Best Rock/Metal Album of 2013. They continue to perform in the United States.

== Discography ==
- The Chosen One (2004)
- Revelation (2012)

== Demos ==
- Hope (2002)
- Labyrinth (2003)
- In your Dreams (2007)
