= Jay Chou albums discography =

Jay Chou discography
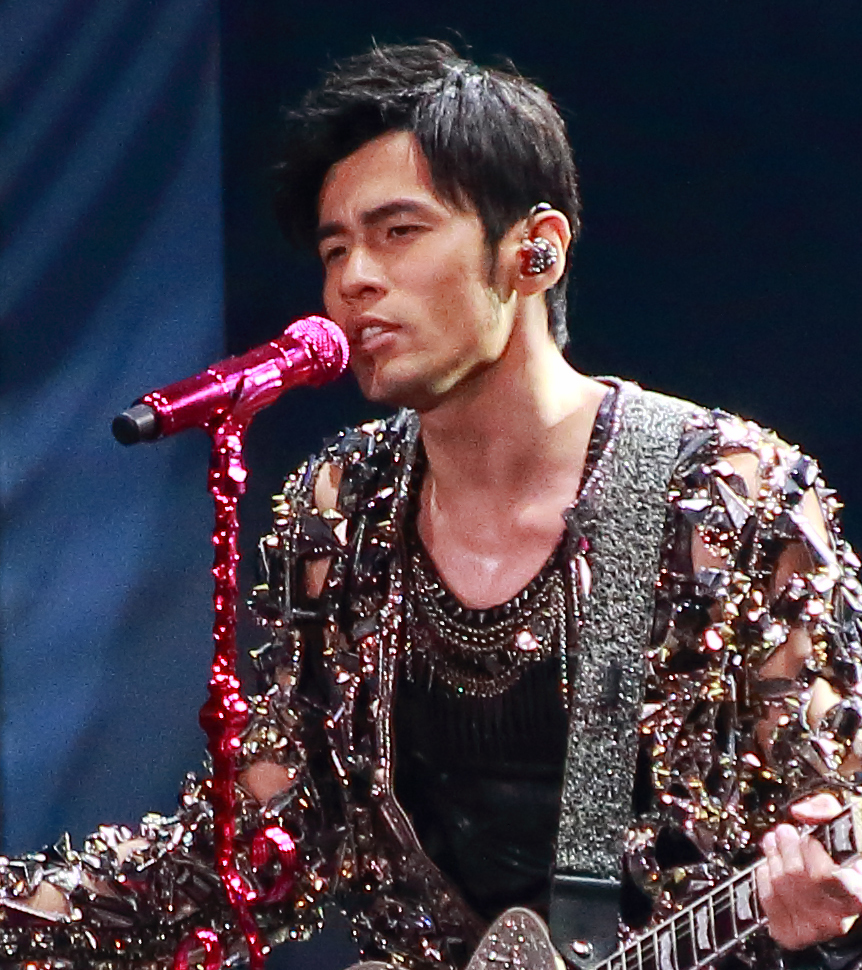
- Chou in 2013
- Studio albums: 16
- Extended plays: 4
- Soundtrack albums: 2
- Live albums: 6
- Compilation albums: 1
- Video albums: 2

The discography of Taiwanese singer-songwriter Jay Chou consists of sixteen studio albums, six live albums, four extended plays, and one compilation album. In 2000, Chou signed under Alfa Music and released his debut studio album Jay, which sold over 250,000 copies in Taiwan. His subsequent studio albums also saw commercial success in Taiwan and Asia, such as Fantasy (2001), The Eight Dimensions (2002), Yeh Hui-Mei (2003) and Common Jasmine Orange (2004). Each release sold over 300,000 copies in Taiwan, making all some of the best-selling albums in the territory.

According to the Guinness World Records, Common Jasmine Orange is the best-selling physical album in China in the 21st century with sales of 2,600,000 copies. His next album, November's Chopin (2005), sold over 280,000 copies in Taiwan and became Chou's fifth consecutive best-selling album of the year, a record that he held since 2001. In August 2007, Chou released the soundtrack album Secret for his directorial debut feature film of the same name, which were both critically successful.

Aiyo, Not Bad (2014) reached number one on the Billboard World Albums chart, while Jay Chou's Bedtime Stories (2016) was a top-seller as well. His fifteenth album, Greatest Works of Art (2022), sold over 200,000 copies in Taiwan and reached the top 40 in Australia and New Zealand. It was deemed the number one best-selling album of 2022 worldwide across all formats by the International Federation of the Phonographic Industry (IFPI).

In Singapore, four of Chou's albums have reached number one on the RIAS album chart during its existence from 2001 to 2005, while seven of his studio albums have reached number one on the Taiwanese G-Music album chart from 2005 to 2015. In Hong Kong, over seven of his records have topped the HKRMA album chart.

== Albums ==
=== Studio albums ===
Title	Album details	Peak chart positions							Sales	Certifications
Title	Album details	TWN	AUS	HK	JPN	NZ	SGP	US World	Sales	Certifications
Jay	Released: 7 November 2000; Label: EMI, Virgin, Alfa Music; Formats: CD, digital download	—	—	—	—	—	—	—	TWN: 250,000; HK: 100,000; SGP: 5,000 (Note: Sales figures are based on the Singaporean gold certification alone.)	RIAS: Gold
Fantasy	Released: 14 September 2001; Label: EMI, Virgin, Alfa Music; Formats: CD, digital download	—	—	—	—	—	1	—	Asia: 1,700,000; TWN: 460,000; HK: 100,000	
The Eight Dimensions	Released: 18 July 2002; Label: EMI, Virgin, Alfa Music; Formats: CD, digital download	—	—	—	—	—	1	—	TWN: 400,000	
Yeh Hui-Mei	Released: 31 July 2003; Label: EMI, Virgin, Alfa Music; Formats: CD, digital download	—	—	—	—	—	1	—	Asia: 3,000,000; TWN: 350,000; SGP: 5,000	RIAS: Gold
Common Jasmine Orange	Released: 3 August 2004; Label: EMI, Virgin, Alfa Music; Formats: CD, digital download	—	—	—	—	—	1	—	Asia: 3,500,000; CHN: 2,600,000; TWN: 300,000	
November's Chopin	Released: 1 November 2005; Label: EMI, Virgin, Alfa Music; Formats: CD, digital download	1	—	—	99	—	—	—	Asia: 3,000,000; TWN: 280,000; SGP: 10,000 (Note: Sales figures are based on the Singaporean platinum certification alone.)	RIAS: Platinum
Still Fantasy	Released: 5 September 2006; Label: EMI, Virgin, Alfa Music; Formats: CD, digital download	1	—	—	63	—	—	—	TWN: 250,000	
On the Run!	Released: 2 November 2007; Label: EMI, Virgin, Alfa Music, JVR Music; Formats: CD, digital download	1	—	—	141	—	—	—	Asia: 1,070,000; SGP: 10,000	RIAS: Platinum
Capricorn	Released: 14 October 2008; Label: EMI, Virgin, Alfa Music, JVR Music; Formats: CD, digital download	1	—	1	—	—	—	—	TWN: 150,000; SGP: 10,000	RIAS: Platinum
The Era	Released: 18 May 2010; Label: EMI, Virgin, Alfa Music, JVR Music; Formats: CD, digital download	1	—	1	195	—	—	—		
Wow!	Released: 11 November 2011; Label: EMI, Virgin, Alfa Music, JVR Music; Formats: CD, digital download	1	—	1	—	—	—	—		
Opus 12	Released: 28 December 2012; Label: Universal, Virgin, Alfa Music, JVR Music; Formats: CD, digital download	1	—	1	—	—	—	—	SGP: 10,000	RIAS: Platinum
Aiyo, Not Bad	Released: 26 December 2014; Label: Universal, Virgin, Alfa Music, JVR Music; Formats: CD, digital download	—	—	1	—	—	—	1	CHN: 174,689 (dl.)	
Jay Chou's Bedtime Stories	Released: 24 June 2016; Label: Universal, Virgin, Alfa Music, JVR Music; Formats: CD, digital download	—	—	1	—	—	—	3	CHN: 2,008,669 (dl.)	
Greatest Works of Art	Released: 15 July 2022; Label: Universal, Virgin, Alfa Music, JVR Music; Formats: CD, digital download	—	29	1	—	40	—	13	CHN: 7,235,393 (dl.); TWN: 200,000	
Children of the Sun	Released: 25 March 2026; Label: Universal, Alfa Music, JVR Music; Formats: CD, digital download	—	—	1	36	37	—	—	JPN: 1,079	
"—" denotes releases that did not chart, were not released in that region, or chart did not exist.

=== Live albums ===
Title	Album details	Peak chart positions		Sales
Title	Album details	TWN DVD	JPN DVD	Sales
The One Concert	Released: 21 October 2002; Label: EMI, Virgin; Formats: CD, digital download	—	—	
2004 Incomparable Concert	Released: 3 December 2004; Label: EMI, Virgin; Formats: CD, digital download	12	—	Asia: 1,000,000
2007 the World Tours	Released: 31 January 2008; Label: EMI, Virgin; Formats: CD, digital download	1	—	
The Era 2010 World Tour	Released: 25 January 2011; Label: EMI, Virgin; Formats: CD, digital download	1	—	
Opus Jay World Tour	Released: 10 May 2016; Label: Universal, Virgin; Formats: CD, digital download	—	—	
The Invincible Concert Tour	Released: 1 November 2019; Label: Universal, Virgin; Formats: CD, digital download	—	—	
Carnival World Tour Japan Special Edition	Released: 3 April 2024 (JPN); Label: A-Sketch; Formats: CD, digital download	—	21	

=== Compilation albums ===
Title	Album details
Initial J (イニシャル・J)	Released: 31 August 2005 (JPN); Label: EMI, Virgin; Formats: CD, digital download

=== Video albums ===
Title	Album details
Dragon Rider (龍戰騎士)	Released: 20 January 2009; Label: EMI, Virgin; Formats: CD, digital download
J Moment	Released: 17 July 2012; Label: Universal, Virgin; Formats: CD, digital download

=== Soundtrack albums ===
Title	Album details	Peak chart positions	Sales
Title	Album details	KOR Int.	Sales
Secret	Released: 13 August 2007; Label: EMI, Virgin; Formats: CD, digital download	6	KOR: 7,439
The Rooftop	Released: 12 July 2013; Label: Universal, Virgin; Formats: CD, digital download	—	

== Extended plays ==
Title	EP details	Peak chart positions
Title	EP details	SGP
Fantasy Plus	Released: 24 December 2001; Label: EMI, Virgin; Formats: CD, digital download	—
Hidden Track	Released: 11 November 2003; Label: EMI, Virgin; Formats: CD, digital download	3
Fearless	Released: 20 January 2006; Label: EMI, Virgin; Formats: CD, digital download	—
Curse of the Golden Flower	Released: 7 December 2006; Label: EMI, Virgin; Formats: CD, digital download	—
