= List of Jay Chou concert tours =

Jay Chou concert tours
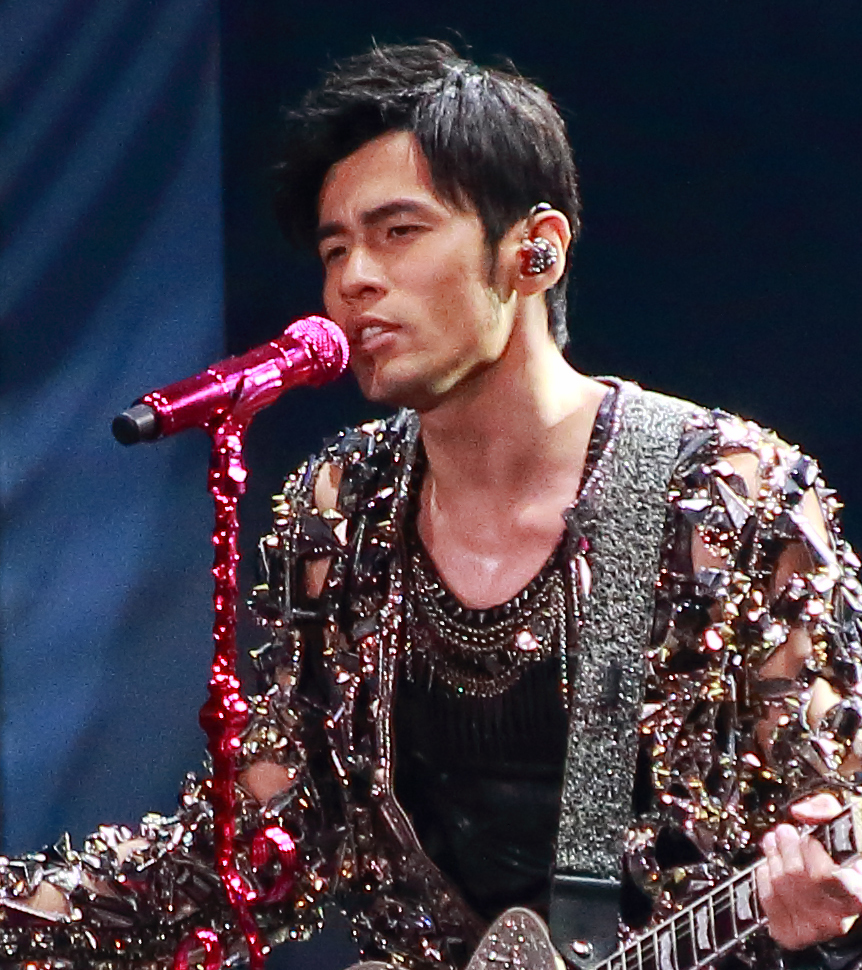
- Chou performing during the Opus Tour in Hong Kong in 2013
- Concert tours: 8
- One-off concerts: 1

Taiwanese singer-songwriter Jay Chou has embarked on eight concert tours since his debut in 2000. After releasing his second album Fantasy (2001), Chou promoted the release with his first concert tour, titled the Fantasy Tour. He embarked on his first worldwide tour later that year in September called the One World Tour, which spanned 16 shows across Asia and North America. His following tour, the Incomparable World Tour, ran from October 2004 and lasted until February 2006. During The World Tour, which began in November 2007, Chou set a record for the most-attended pop concert at the Shanghai Stadium with 60,000 people in attendance.

The Opus Jay World Tour began in May 2013 and attracted a total of 1,800,000 people before concluding in December 2015, grossing NT$7.245 billion ($250 million) in revenue. His subsequent tour, The Invincible World Tour, began in June 2016 following the release of his fourteenth studio album Jay Chou's Bedtime Stores. It became his most expansive tour yet, spanning 120 concerts across Asia, North America, Europe, and Oceania, making him one of the few Mandopop acts to hold a tour exceeding 100 shows. It was attended by 3,000,000 people in total, making it amongst the most-attended tours by a Greater Chinese artist.

The Carnival World Tour began in October 2019 and currently spans 92 shows across various continents. In mainland China, media outlets reported elevated economic activity and a significant increase in tourism in cities visited by the tour. Several cities have reported economic impacts even surpassing those of major public holidays such as May Day and the Dragon Boat Festival.

== Concert tours ==
Title	Dates	Associated album(s)	Continent(s)	Shows	Attendance	Revenue	Ref.
Fantasy Tour	November 3, 2001 – February 10, 2002	Fantasy	Asia	5	—	—	
The One World Tour	September 28, 2002 – January 3, 2004	The Eight Dimensions	Asia; North America	16	—	—	
Incomparable World Tour	October 2, 2004 – February 6, 2006	Common Jasmine Orange; November's Chopin	Asia; North America	24	—	—	
The World Tour	November 10, 2007 – August 28, 2009	On the Run! Capricorn	Asia; North America; Oceania	42	—	—	
The Era World Tour	June 11, 2010 – December 18, 2011	The Era	Asia; North America	61	—	—	
Opus Jay World Tour	May 17, 2013 – December 20, 2015	Opus 12; Aiyo, Not Bad	Asia; Oceania	76	1,800,000	$250,000,000	
The Invincible World Tour	June 30, 2016 – May 2, 2019	Jay Chou's Bedtime Stores	Asia; Europe; North America; Oceania	120	3,000,000	—	
Carnival World Tour	October 17, 2019 – October 11, 2025	Greatest Works of Art	Asia; Europe; Oceania	110	—	—	
Carnival II World Tour	April 3, 2026 –	Children of the Sun	Asia; Europe; Oceania		—	—	

=== Fantasy Tour ===
The Fantasy Tour (Chinese: 范特西 世界巡回演唱会) was the first concert tour by Jay Chou. It spanned five shows across Taiwan, China, Malaysia, and Singapore.

Date	City	Country	Venue
November 3, 2001	Taoyuan	Taiwan	Taoyuan Arena
November 4, 2001	Hong Kong		Hong Kong Coliseum
November 5, 2001	Hong Kong		Hong Kong Coliseum
February 8, 2002	Kuala Lumpur	Malaysia	Putra Indoor Stadium
February 10, 2002	Singapore		Suntec City Mall

=== The One World Tour ===
The One World Tour was the second concert tour by Jay Chou. It spanned 16 shows across Asia and North America. The tour began at the Taipei Municipal Stadium on September 28, 2002, which drew around 30,000 people.

Date	City	Country	Venue
September 28, 2002	Taipei	Taiwan	Taipei Municipal Stadium
December 12, 2002	Hong Kong		Hong Kong Coliseum
December 13, 2002	Hong Kong		Hong Kong Coliseum
December 14, 2002	Hong Kong		Hong Kong Coliseum
December 15, 2002	Hong Kong		Hong Kong Coliseum
December 16, 2002	Hong Kong		Hong Kong Coliseum
December 25, 2002	Las Vegas	United States	MGM Grand Las Vegas
January 11, 2003	Singapore		Singapore Indoor Stadium
January 12, 2003	Singapore		Singapore Indoor Stadium
February 28, 2003	Vancouver	Canada	Queen Elizabeth Theatre
May 17, 2003	Kuala Lumpur	Malaysia	Stadium Merdeka
September 12, 2003	Beijing	China	Workers' Stadium
December 12, 2003	Shanghai	China	Shanghai Stadium
December 20, 2003	Guangzhou	China	Tianhe Stadium
December 23, 2003	Bangkok	Thailand	Impact, Muang Thong Thani
January 3, 2004	Shenzhen	China	Shenzhen Stadium
