= Jay Chou filmography =

List of acting performances

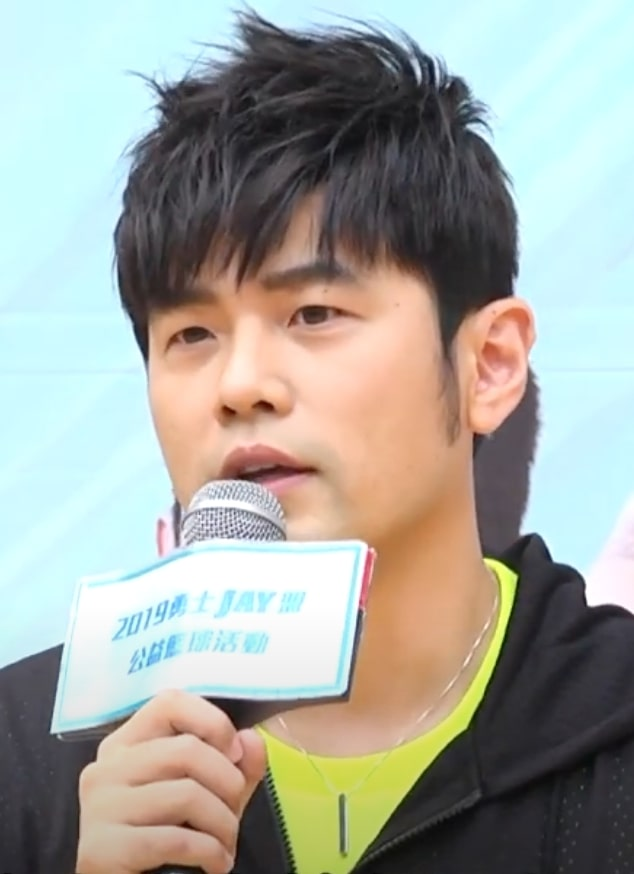
- Chou in 2019
- Feature films: 15
- Television shows: 3
- Reality shows: 7
- Musicals: 1

Taiwanese singer-songwriter and actor Jay Chou has worked in fifteen feature films, three television shows, appeared in seven reality or variety shows, and worked in one adapted musical. He has also directed, starred in, and recorded soundtrack albums for two feature films: Secret (2007), and The Rooftop (2013).

== Feature films ==
Jay Chou film appearances
Year	English title	Chinese title	Role	Notes
2003	Hidden Track	尋找周杰倫	Himself	Cameo
2005	Initial D	頭文字D	Takumi Fujiwara	
2006	Curse of the Golden Flower	滿城盡帶黃金甲	Prince Jai (Prince Yuanjie)	
2007	Secret	不能說的秘密	Jay Ye Xiang Lun	Directorial film debut. Other roles: writer, producer, actor and composer.
2008	Kung Fu Dunk	功夫灌篮	Fang Shi Jie	
2009	The Treasure Hunter	刺陵	Qiao Fei	
2010	True Legend	蘇乞兒	God of Wushu / Drunken God	
2011	The Green Hornet		Kato	Hollywood debut film
2012	The Viral Factor	逆戰	Jon Wan	
2012	Abba	阿爸	Himself	Cameo
2013	The Rooftop	天台	Wax	Also as director, screenwriter and producer
2016	Kung Fu Panda 3		Master Monkey	Mandarin dub for Chinese and Taiwanese release. Also producer of theme song "Try"
2016	Now You See Me 2		Li	
2016	10,000 Miles	一萬公里的約定	Himself	Cameo; Also executive producer
TBA	XXX 4			

== Films directed and starred in ==
Films that Jay Chou has directed and starred in
Year	English title	Original title	Role
2007	Secret	不能說的·秘密	Ye Xianglun
2013	The Rooftop	天台	Wax (浪子膏)

== Television shows ==
Jay Chou television show appearances
Year	English title	Original title	Role
1998	Thyme Fried Fish	百里香煎魚	Musician
2010	Pandamen	熊猫人	Detective Leo Lee; director
2011	Blue Star	藍星	

== Reality and variety shows ==
Jay Chou reality and variety show appearances
Year	English title	Original title	Role	Notes
2010	Mr.J Channel	MR.J頻道	Host	
2015	The Voice of China 4	中国好声音4	Judge	
2016	Sing! China	中国新歌声1	Judge	
2017	Sing! China 2	中国新歌声2	Judge	
2018	Sing! China 3	中国好声音2018	Judge	
2018	This is Dunk	这！就是灌篮	Judge	
2020	J-Style Trip	周遊記	Himself	Netflix travelogue

== Adapted musical ==
Jay Chou adapted musicals
Year	Title	Director	Introduction
2016	Secret	John Rando	Adapted from the movie of the same name by Jay Chou. Produced by the Broadway in China and Broadway teams in the United States, it runs through Jay Chou's classic songs over the years, starting a global tour in Beijing Tianqiao Art Center in December 2016.
