= Initial J =

2005 compilation album by Jay Chou

Greatest hits album by Jay Chou
- Released: 31 August 2005
- Genre: Mandopop
- Length: 52:24
- Language: Mandarin
- Labels: Sony, Alfa Music
- Producer: Jay Chou

Jay Chou chronology
2004 Incomparable Concert (2005)	Initial J (2005)	November's Chopin (2005)

Initial J is the first greatest hits album by Taiwanese singer Jay Chou, released on 31 August 2005 by Sony Music Japan and Alfa Music. It features each songs from Jay, Fantasy, The Eight Dimensions, Yeh Hui-mei, Common Jasmin Orange and November's Chopin.

== Track listing ==
Standard edition

1. "All the Way North" (一路向北) – 4:57 (from album November's Chopin)
2. "Nunchucks" (雙截棍) – 3:23 (from album Fantasy)
3. "Adorable Woman" (可愛女人) – 4:01 (from album Jay)
4. "The Final Battle" (最後的戰役) – 4:14 (from album The Eight Dimensions)
5. "Double Blade" (雙刀) – 4:56 (from album Yeh Hui-mei)
6. "Ninja" (忍者) – 2:41 (from album Fantasy)
7. "In Father's Name" (以父之名) – 5:43 (from album Yeh Hui-mei)
8. "Black Humor" (黑色幽默) – 4:45 (from album Jay)
9. "My Territory" (我的地盤) – 4:02 (from album Common Jasmine Orange)
10. "East Wind Breaks" (東風破) – 5:17 (from album Yeh Hui-mei)
11. "Common Jasmin Orange" (七里香) – 4:59 (from album with the same name)
12. "Drifting" (飄移) – 3:49 (from album November's Chopin)

Limited edition

1. "Adorable Woman" (可愛女人) – 4:01 (from album Jay)
2. "Black Humor" (黑色幽默) – 4:45 (from album Jay)
3. "Ninja" (忍者) – 2:41 (from album Fantasy)
4. "Nunchucks" (雙截棍) – 3:23 (from album Fantasy)
5. "The Final Battle" (最後的戰役) – 4:14 (from album The Eight Dimensions)
6. "In Father's Name" (以父之名) – 5:43 (from album Yeh Hui-mei)
7. "East Wind Breaks" (東風破) – 5:17 (from album Yeh Hui-mei)
8. "Double Blade" (雙刀) – 4:56 (from album Yeh Hui-mei)
9. "Common Jasmin Orange" (七里香) – 4:59 (from album with the same name)
10. "Grandma" (外婆) – 4:07 (from album Common Jasmine Orange)
11. "Drifting" (飄移) – 3:49 (from album November's Chopin)
12. "All the Way North" (一路向北) – 4:57 (from album November's Chopin)

Bonus MVs

1. "Adorable Woman" (可愛女人)
2. "Black Humor" (黑色幽默)
3. "The Final Battle" (最後的戰役)
4. "In Father's Name" (以父之名)
5. "East Wind Breaks" (東風破)
6. "Double Blade" (雙刀)
7. "Common Jasmin Orange" (七里香)
8. "Drifting" (飄移)
