= Jay Chou discography =

Jay Chou discography may refer to:

- Jay Chou albums discography
- Jay Chou singles discography
