= November's Chopin =

Studio album by Jay Chou
- Released: 1 November 2005
- Recorded: 2004–2005
- Studios: Alfa Studio (Taipei); Yang Dawei Studio (Taipei)
- Genres: R&B; pop; soft rock
- Length: 51:58
- Language: Mandarin
- Labels: Alfa Music; Sony BMG
- Producer: Jay Chou

Jay Chou chronology
Initial J (2005)	November's Chopin (2005)	Fearless (2006)

Singles from November's Chopin
- 1. "Nocturne" Released: 17 October 2005; 2. "Hair Like Snow" Released: 1 November 2005; 3. "Maple Leaf" Released: 1 November 2005; 4. "Coral Sea" Released: 1 November 2005; 5. "All the Way North" Released: 1 November 2005

November's Chopin (traditional Chinese: 十一月的蕭邦; simplified Chinese: 十一月的肖邦; pinyin: Shíyī yuè de xiāobāng) is the sixth studio album by Taiwanese recording artist Jay Chou. It was released on 1 November 2005, by Alfa Music and Sony BMG. The album's production was handled entirely by Chou himself, while the lyrical content was handled by frequent collaborator Vincent Fang along with songwriters Devon Song, Alang Huang, and Michael Lin. November's Chopin, like its predecessors, is primary a R&B and pop record that also utilizes soft rock. The title of the album pays homage to Polish composer and pianist Frédéric Chopin, whom Chou has admired since his childhood.

The album was met with positive reviews from music critics upon its release. In Taiwan, it peaked at number one on the G-Music album chart for multiple weeks and was best-selling album of the year, with sales of over 280,000 copies. It became the singer's fifth consecutive yearly number-one album in Taiwan since his second studio album, Fantasy, in 2001. It was also a massive commercial blockbuster in mainland China, selling 2 million copies there. November's Chopin was later certified platinum in Singapore in 2019. In all, the album has sold 2.7 million copies in Asia.

Multiple singles were promoted for November's Chopin—"Nocturne", "Hair Like Snow", "Maple Leaf", "Coral Sea", and "All the Way North". The album received several accolades and regional award ceremonies, including Best Original Album at the Metro Radio Music Awards as well as Song of the Year and Best Music Video for "Nocturne" at the China Music Awards. The Chinese Musicians Exchange Association named the record one of the top 10 albums of 2005.

== Background and production ==
Because of his busy schedule filming and promotion for his first movie, Initial D, and his Incomparable Tour, Chou's album, November's Chopin, missed his usual summer release window. On 20 September 2005, it was reported that Chou had already begun recording demos for his new album. After concluding his concerts in Harbin and Shenzhen, Chou announced that he would release his new album in November 2005. On 14 October 2005, Sony Music announced that Chou 's latest album for 2005 would be officially released globally on November 1st; the album, originally titled the obscure "Jay the Thief," had been changed to "November's Chopin."

The title of the song “Nocturne” comes from Chopin’s work “ Nocturne ”, and it is the earliest completed work on the album. "Hair Like Snow" is a song brought about by lyricist Vincent Fang. Originally, Chou did not plan to include a song with Eastern elements in the album, but Fang had already written the lyrics for "Hair Like Snow". Chou changed his mind and felt that he still wanted to influence others rather than be influenced by others. Therefore, he spent only two hours composing "Hair Like Snow", while the "la-er-la" section in the latter part of the song was an improvisation by Chou while recording in the studio, inspired by Nan Quan Mama's song "Mudanjian."

Chou felt that including a song expressing a young girl's sentiments on the album would be more likely to sell well, so with the market in mind, he wrote "Coral Sea." Before recording the song, Chou, with the intention of giving Lara Veronin a boost, and because he felt that Veronin's voice was clean and perfectly suited to the song, chose to collaborate with Veronin to complete the song.

== Composition and songs ==
Fellow Taiwanese singer Lara Veronin (pictured) was featured on a duet on the album.

"Nocturne" is an R&B track with a light classical-themed background music played by piano and acoustic guitar, and was the first piece to be completed for the record in November 2004. The lyrics describe the death of a lover, using metaphors involving black crows and wells to express emotion. The production of "Blue Storm" utilizes distorted electric guitar and turntable scratching, while its lyrics deal with religious themes. The track "Hair Like Snow" incorporates traditional Chinese instruments including the pipa and yangqin, while the vocals are sung softly. Towards the end, a false voice is used.

"Black Sweater" is an R&B piece with a slow tempo, and incorporates acoustic guitar on top of soft vocals. The lyrics expresses one's longing for their beloved. "Surrounded" utilizes violin, cello and synthesizers, while its lyrics express his resentment towards the paparazzi. Chou openly calls them "dogs" who "bite an apple in their mouths and hold a camera in their hands". Toward the end of the track, Chou raps a few lines in Korean.

"Maple Leaf" incorporates piano, violin and cello over a soft R&B beat. The lyrics describe the sorrow behind a lost love. "Romantic Cellphone" is a R&B piece that features an electric guitar, whereas "Against" is a hip-hop number. "Malt Candy" uses violin and electric guitar with lyrics focusing on romance themes. "Coral Sea" is a duet between Jay Chou and Lara Veronin and utilizes instrumentations from piano, violin, acoustic and electric guitars.

== Title and artwork ==
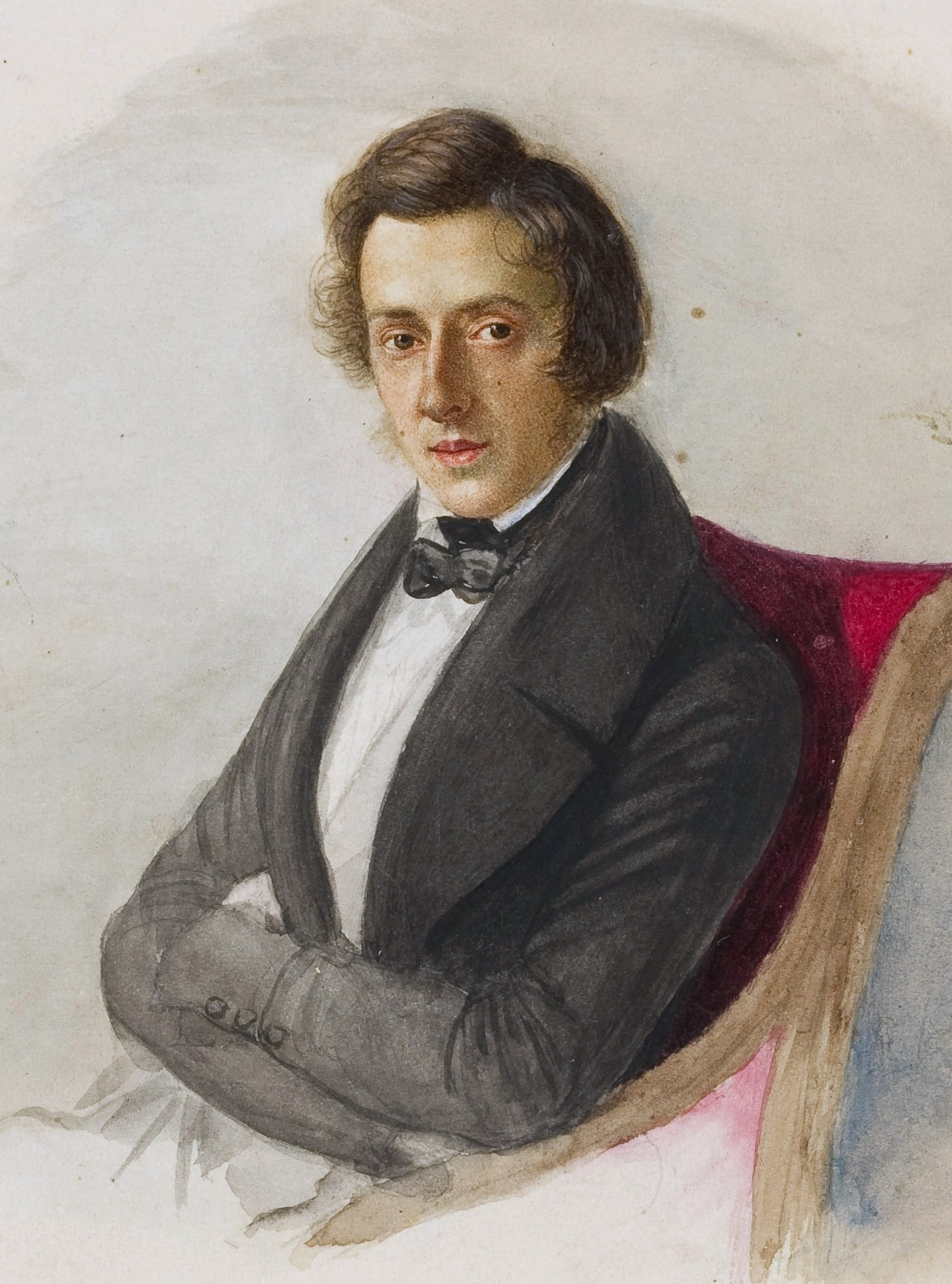
The album was named after composer Frédéric Chopin, which Chou credits as his childhood idol.

Because at the 16th Golden Melody Awards, Chou and Nan Quan Mama performed a piano duet, Alpha Records was inspired by the idea of “in the name of the piano poet,” which led to the album ultimately being titled November’s Chopin. Chopin also happens to be Chou’s idol, so he immediately agreed to the name. Since the album was produced in Taiwan, the Mainland China release directly adopted the Taiwanese translation of “Chopin” as “Xiao Bang” (萧邦). After filming in Italy, Vladivostok, and Japan, the album cover and interior photos for November's Chopin were all taken in Venice, with the album cover being shot in front of Piazza San Marco. The entire album photoshoot cost an astonishing 1 million yuan, excluding airfare and accommodation, setting a new record for Chou's most expensive photoshoot at that point.

== Release and promotion ==
The pre-sale for November's Chopin began in various regions on 19 October 2005. The album's lead single "Nocturne" premiered on radio Hit FM and was broadcast simultaneously on 50 radio stations across Asia on 17 October 2005, which was the anniversary of Chopin's death. The music video for "Nocturne" premiered in Asia on 21 October 2005.

On 1 November 2005, it was announced that the album had surpassed 70,000 preorders in Taiwan and 1.5 million preorders across Asia. The album sold sold 30,000 copies on its first day in Sichuan and nearly 30,000 copies were snapped up by fans within three hours of its release in Chengdu. On 14 December 2005, Chou appeared in Beijing to attend a ceremony held by his record company to celebrate the achievement of November's Chopin selling 2 million copies in mainland China. On 17 December 2005, the media revealed that November's Chopin was the best-selling record of the year in Taiwan, making it the singer's fifth consecutive yearly number-one album in Taiwan since his second studio album, Fantasy, in 2001. It also ranked first place on the 2005 annual sales charts of both G-Music and Five Music.

=== Singles and music videos ===
The music video for "Nocturne" was directed by Kuang Sheng and shot in New York City; the video contains scenes of Chou looking back the sweet memories of his dead girlfriend through recorded videos. The music video for "Blue Storm" was directed by Chou himself and filmed largely in a church. The music video for "Hair Like Snow" was also directed by Chou and tells a tragic, multi-lifetime love story featuring period-accurate traditional costumes and dramatic martial arts choreography. The music video for "Black Sweater" was directed by Kuang Sheng and the video perfectly blends classic stone arch bridges, gondolas navigating the Venetian canals (sound of rowing), and the melancholic atmosphere of late autumn. The music video for "Surrounded" was directed by Kuang Sheng and was filmed in Venice, with scenes of Chou being a James Bond-like spy, constantly avoiding being detected.

The music video for "Maple" was directed by Chou; the video was shot with Japanese cultural settings, featuring Will Liu as the man who replaced Chou as the love of a beautiful lady after the lady lost her memories. The music video for "Romantic Cellphone" was directed by Lai Wei-Kang and Shawn Yu and features a Cantonese speaking lady being playful with Chou over a feature phone. The music video for "Against" was directed by Kuang Sheng and was shot in New York City, with scenes of Chou having a rap battle in an underground stage. The music video for "Malt Candy" was directed by Chou, with scenes of Chou and his bandmates playing over a very cute background. The music video for "Coral Sea" was directed by Vincent Fang, with storyline revolving around the classic story of a girl caught in a love triangle between both rich man and poor dude.

On 6 January 2006, the tracks "Nocturne", "Coral Sea" and "Hair Like Snow", were listed at number 1, number 7, and number 31 respectively on the 2005 Hit FM Top 100 Singles of the Year chart.

== Critical reception ==
Professional ratings
Review scores
Source	Rating
MTVChinese.com	3/5 stars
Taipei Times	(favorable)

November's Chopin received generally positive reviews from music critics. Apin of MTVChinese.com gave the album a score of three out of five stars; the reviewer felt November’s Chopin is polished but ultimately predictable, offering all the usual “Jay‑style” elements without the spark or innovation of his earlier work. They reminisce about how fresh and exciting Chou’s early songs felt and argue that this album lacks that same impact, despite still sounding like unmistakable Jay Chou. While praising “Nocturne” and some melodies, they note that many tracks resemble older songs and that the promised classical influence didn’t live up to expectations. In the end, they conclude that their own high hopes—and Chou’s own hype—may have set the bar too high.

Gavin Phipps of the Taipei Times gave the album a warmly enthusiastic review on his "Best CDs of 2005" article, calling November’s Chopin Chou’s most mature and introspective album yet. Phipps acknowledges that ranking it the year’s best might look like favoritism, but argues the choice is justified by its musical depth and huge commercial impact. Phipps highlighted Chou’s shift toward moody, piano‑ and guitar‑driven ballads as a successful evolution that impressed older listeners in particular, and they frame the album as a clear artistic high point in his career.

In 2020, to celebrate Chou's 20th anniversary in the industry, NetEase conducted a ranking of Chou's best albums, with November's Chopin being placed third on the list. Yuan Yong‑xing of HERE magazine, praised Chou’s 2005 album November’s Chopin for its strong production, cohesive structure, and continued influence on Mandopop. Yuan highlights standout tracks such as “Nocturne” and notes that the album maintains Chou’s creative consistency despite limited stylistic innovation.

== Accolades ==
November's Chopin was nominated for two Golden Melody Awards. The album won for an IFPI Hong Kong Top Sales Music Award for Top 10 Best Selling Mandarin Albums of the Year. The album was awarded the Best Original Album award at the 2005 Metro Radio Music Awards. The album was also placed on the shortlist of the Top 10 Albums of the Year by the Chinese Musicians Exchange Association.

"Nocturne" won the Hot Song Award at the 2005 Metro Radio Music Awards; the song also won Song of the Year and it's accompanying video won the Best Music Video Award at the 2006 China Music Awards. Vincent Fang won the Best Lyricist award for the song "Hair Like Snow" at the Chinese Music Media Awards. The track, "Drifting," was nominated a Golden Horse Award for Best Original Film Song and a Hong Kong Film Award for Best Original Film Song.

== Track listing ==
All music is composed by Jay Chou.

November's Chopin track listing
No.	Title	Lyrics	Length
1.	"Nocturne" (夜曲; Yèqǔ)	Vincent Fang	3:48
2.	"Blue Storm" (藍色風暴; Lán sè fēngbào)	Vincent Fang	4:46
3.	"Hair Like Snow" (髮如雪; Fà rú xuě)	Vincent Fang	5:01
4.	"Black Sweater" (黑色毛衣; Hēisè máoyī)	Jay Chou	4:11
5.	"Surrounded" (四面楚歌; Sì miàn chǔ gē)	Jay Chou, Michael Lin (Rap)	4:07
6.	"Maple Leaf" (楓; Fēng)	Devon Song	4:37
7.	"Romantic Cellphone" (浪漫手機; Làngmàn shǒujī)	Vincent Fang	3:59
8.	"Against" (逆鱗; Nìlín)	Alang Huang	3:54
9.	"Malt Candy" (麥芽糖; Mài yá táng)	Vincent Fang	4:20
10.	"Coral Sea" (珊瑚海; Shān hú hǎi; featuring Lara Liang)	Vincent Fang	4:16
11.	"Drifting" (飄移; Piāoyí; From Initial D (film) Theme Songs)	Vincent Fang	4:04
12.	"All the Way North" (一路向北; Yī lù xiàng běi; From Initial D (film) Theme Songs)	Vincent Fang	4:54
Total length:			51:58

== Charts ==
=== Weekly charts ===
Chart (2005)	Peak position
Japanese Albums (Oricon)	99
Taiwanese Albums (G-Music)	1

=== Year-end charts ===
Chart (2005)	Position
Taiwanese Albums (Note: Best-selling albums of the year in Taiwan as reported by media outlets)	1

== Certifications ==
Region	Certification	Certified units/sales
China	—	2,000,000
Singapore (RIAS)	Platinum	10,000^{*}
Taiwan	—	280,000
^{*} Sales figures based on certification alone.
