= Kung Fu Dunk =

2008 Taiwanese-Hong Kong-Chinese film by Kevin Chu

- Poster featuring Jay Chou as lead actor
- Directed by: Kevin Chu
- Written by: Wang Yu-chen; Lam Chiu-Wing; Kevin Chu
- Produced by: Zhao Xiaoding
- Starring: Jay Chou; Eric Tsang; Charlene Choi; Chen Bolin
- Cinematography: Zhao Xiaoding
- Edited by: Zhao Xiaoding
- Music by: Jay Chou
- Distributed by: Shanghai Film Group Corporation (China); Emperor Motion Pictures (Hong Kong); MediaCorp Raintree Pictures (Singapore)
- Release date: 7 February 2008
- Running time: 98 minutes
- Countries: Taiwan; Hong Kong; China
- Languages: Mandarin; Cantonese

Kung Fu Dunk (traditional Chinese: 功夫灌籃; simplified Chinese: 功夫灌篮; pinyin: Gōngfū Guànlán), also known by its former title Slam Dunk, is a 2008 Chinese-language action comedy film. It was directed by Taiwanese director Kevin Chu and filmed in Taiwan and mainland China. The film was previously titled Slam Dunk, but the title was later changed to avoid confusion with the Slam Dunk manga and anime series which it was roughly based on despite the film itself having no association whatsoever. The filming, however, conveyed a strong flavour of Hong Kong films, reminiscent of movies like Shaolin Soccer. It features a list of pop stars from Taiwan and Hong Kong, along with well-known actors of Mainland China.

In 2008, the theme song "周大俠" (Hero Chou), which was composed by Jay Chou (who also stars) with lyrics by Vincent Fang and performed by Yi Chuan, was nominated for Best Original Song at the 45th Golden Horse Awards, which is included as a bonus track on Jay Chou 2007 World Tour Concert Live.

== Plot ==
The film revolves around an orphaned boy called Fang Shi-jie (Jay Chou), who grew up in a kung fu school and becomes a talented basketball player. Every morning, he is used as a punchbag in a demonstration by the principal of the school. When he uses shaolin iron vest (iron shirt) technique, as to not feel the principal's punches, the principal makes him stay on the streets for one night without dinner. He demonstrates his incredible accuracy to a down-and-out hustler, Wang Li by throwing cans into a bin almost ten metres away. Wang tells him, that if he can throw a coin into his mouth from twenty metres away, he would treat him to dinner. They go to a five-star French restaurant, where Wang Li's daughter works, and eat leftovers. Li convinces Shi-jie to help them make some money for themselves. After eating, they go to a Casino owned by one of Wang Li's old friend's son, Brother Hu. There, Shi-jie wins hundreds of dollars playing darts. The resulting fight causes thousands of dollars' worth of damage. The next morning, before school starts, Bi Tianhao, the principal of Fireball University puts the principal of the kung fu school onto his paylist. Then, after a massive beating by Bi Tianhao's thugs, Shi-jie is expelled. The next night, Shi-jie is once again sitting on the park bench where he met Wang Li, who is still there. On the pretext of helping him search for his family, Wang Li invites him to play basketball at 'First University' as the new star of its basketball team. Meanwhile, Wang Li capitalises on media interest in Shi-jie to make money via interviews and news articles.

After joining the basketball team, Shi-jie finds that Li-ji (Lily) (Charlene Choi) whom he had admired for a long time is the sister of Ting Wei (Bolin Chen), the leader of the basketball team. Shi-jie is desperate to draw her attention. Therefore, he attempts to compete with Xiao Lan (Baron Chen), who is Li-li's idol. The competition between Shi-jie and Xiao Lan generates an unstable atmosphere within the team. After Ting Wei counsels Shi Jie, the basketball team becomes more unified. Meanwhile, he helped Shi Jie combine his foundation of Kung-Fu skills into basketball techniques, which in turn brings his skills into full play and helps the team win many rounds of the inter-varsity tournament.

By the time of the finals, the major competitor faced by Shi-jie and his team members is the team of Fireball University, led by Li Tian. Li used to be on the First University basketball team alongside Ting Wei and Xiao Lan, but became arrogant and was lured to their competitor's camp. The competing team composed of players who had been banned from all basketball games in Japan. Fireball University also bribed the referee of the final game. Although Wang Li had enlisted the aid of Shi-jie's kung-fu teachers, the opposing team had put in place a number of measures to prevent First University from winning, up to and including injuring First University's star players Shi-jie, Ting Wei and Xiao Lan. Thus, due to both unscrupulous fouls from the opposing team and the referee's biased decisions and outright interference by punching out the last ball that Shi-jie throws, First University is defeated. Unwilling to admit defeat to such unjust conditions, Shi-jie recalls a technique his first teacher had utilised, and manages to turn back the clock to the time just before Shi-jie is to make his last throw of the game. Given a second chance and instead of trying to make the same last throw which will be interfered by the referee again, Shi-jie decides to pass to Ting Wei, who in turn dunks it past Li Tian into the basket. Eventually, First University wins.

After the game, Shi-jie discovered that his dad is the richest man in Asia. He later visits his father, and discovers that he was abandoned for his safety during a difficult financial time of his father's life. His dad insisted that he go to London to expand his future. Later that night, Shi-jie decided to stay with Wang Li instead, who later suggested for him to show his skills in an event greater than any basketball match - the Olympic Games.

== Cast ==
- Jay Chou as Fang Shi-jie
- Eric Tsang as Zhen Wangli
- Charlene Choi as Li-li (Lily)
- Chen Bolin as Ting Wei
- Baron Chen as Xiao Lan
- Wang Gang as Wang Biao
- Will Liu as Li Tian
- Ng Man-tat as Master Wu
- Bryan Leung as Master Fei
- Eddy Ko as Shi-jie's master
- Kenneth Tsang as Wang Yi-wan
- Huang Bo as Master Huang
- Yan Ni as Master Ni

In the initial planning for filming, director Kevin Chu wanted NBA player Yao Ming to make a cameo appearance in the film. However, he is unlikely to do so due to injuries.

Chinese sports commentator Huang Jianxiang makes a guest appearance where he commentates on a match. The final minutes of this match is a parody of Huang's live-action commentary of the Australia-Italy match at the 2006 World Cup that garnered international attention.

== Filming ==
Most of the filming was completed in Shanghai, evidenced by the Shanghai skyline at night, as well the numerous scenes filmed at the interior and exterior of the Shanghai Science and Technology Museum in Pudong.

Dailies were leaked on several websites, lacking CGI and sound effects.

== Sequel ==
In 2008, it was widely reported that the sequel is on the way, and production has begun.
