= Common Jasmine Orange (song) =

Single by Jay Chou

from the album Common Jasmine Orange
- Released: July 2004
- Recorded: 2003
- Studio: Alfa Studio (Taipei)
- Genre: Soft rock
- Length: 4:57
- Label: JVR Music
- Songwriter: Vincent Fang
- Producer: Jay Chou

Jay Chou singles chronology
"In the Name of the Father" (2003)	"Common Jasmine Orange" (2004)	"Wounds of War" (2004)

Music video
- "Common Jasmine Orange" on YouTube

"Common Jasmine Orange" (Chinese: 七里香; pinyin: Qī Lǐ Xiāng) is a song by Taiwanese singer-songwriter Jay Chou, from his fifth studio album of the same name (2004). "Common Jasmine Orange" was written by frequent collaborator Vincent Fang while production and composition was handled by Chou. It premiered on various radio stations in Asia on July 21, 2004, as the lead single from the album. The title of the single and the album took inspiration from the poem Seven Miles of Fragrance by Xi Murong.

Musically, "Common Jasmine Orange" is a soft rock number that incorporates elements of R&B and traditional Chinese instrumentations. Music critics praised the song for its composition and lyrics, drawing parallels with Chinese music and influences. The single performed well in Taiwan, ranking number one on the Hit FM Top 100 Singles of the Year list for 2004. In 2023, it reached number four on the Malaysian Chinese Chart compiled by RIM.

The music video for the single features Japanese actress Chie Tanaka and depicts Chou alongside Chie in various settings in the countryside. The song won various awards at regional award ceremonies, including three awards at the Hong Kong Jade Solid Gold Awards, Outstanding Chinese Popular Song at the Top Ten Chinese Gold Songs Awards, Song of the Year at the Global Chinese Golden Chart Awards, amongst others.

== Background and composition ==
"Common Jasmine Orange"
A 27-second sample of "Common Jasmine Orange", highlighting its soft rock and R&B production that draws influences from traditional Chinese music.

"Common Jasmine Orange" is a Chinese-style poetic love song that was inspired by the poem Seven Miles of Fragrance by Xi Murong. Commentators have described the song as a romantic summer number that captures the feelings one gets from a love interest.

== Music video ==
The music video for the song was filmed in Takasaki, Gunma Prefecture, Japan. The chosen locations for the shoot included local shrines, rice paddies, and fields of flowers. During the filming of the movie Initial D in Japan, Chou requested a day off from the crew to shoot the music video. In the video, he and actress Chie Tanaka are shown running through the garden hand in hand and sitting on a swing.

== Usage in education ==
In 2007, the lyrics of "Common Jasmine Orange" appeared on an exam at Xuhui High School in Taipei. In the exam, the questions asked: "In Jay Chou's song 'Common Jasmine Orange', he creates the image of 'summer' to express his love for a woman. What is the symbolic meaning?", as well as: "In the line 'The taste of saury, both the cat and you want to know', what techniques does the author use to express the man's passion for a woman?" In response, lyricist Vincent Fang said that even he could not answer the questions, and in the end only five students passed.

== Accolades ==
Awards and nominations for "Common Jasmine Orange"
Organization	Year	Award	Result	Ref.
China Music Awards	2005	Best Song of the Year	Won	
Global Chinese Golden Chart Awards	2005	Top 25 Songs	Won	
Golden Melody Awards	2005	Best Composer	Nominated	
Hito Music Awards	2005	Audience Favorite Song	Won	
Hito Music Awards	2005	Top Ten Chinese Songs of the Year	Won	
Jade Solid Gold Awards	2004	Best Composer	Won	
Jade Solid Gold Awards	2004	Best Producer	Won	
Jade Solid Gold Awards	2004	Best Arranger	Won	
Music Radio China Top Chart Awards	2005	Most Popular Hong Kong & Taiwan Songs	Won	
RTHK Top 10 Gold Songs Awards	2004	Best Lyricist of the Year	Won	
RTHK Top 10 Gold Songs Awards	2005	Outstanding Chinese Popular Song	Won	
RTHK Top 10 Gold Songs Awards	2005	Top Ten Golden Songs Award	Won	

== Charts ==
=== Weekly charts ===
Chart (2023)	Peak position
Malaysian Chinese Chart (RIM)	4

== Release history ==
"Common Jasmine Orange" release history
Region	Date	Format	Label	Ref.
Taiwan	July 21, 2004	Contemporary hit radio	JVR Music	
China	July 21, 2004	Contemporary hit radio	JVR Music	
Singapore	July 21, 2004	Contemporary hit radio	JVR Music	
Malaysia	July 21, 2004	Contemporary hit radio	JVR Music	
Hong Kong	July 21, 2004	Contemporary hit radio	JVR Music	
