= Hidden Track (film) =

2003 Hong Kong film by Audrey Lam

- Film poster
- Traditional Chinese: 尋找周杰倫
- Simplified Chinese: 寻找周杰伦
- Directed by: Audrey Lam
- Written by: Audrey Lam
- Produced by: Teddy Chan
- Starring: Po Lok Tung; Shawn Yue; Daniel Wu; David Wu; Eason Chan; Emme Wong; Denise Ho; Ah Niu; Jay Chou
- Cinematography: Kwan Pun Leung
- Music by: Peter Kam
- Production companies: China Film Co-Production Corporation; Sum-Wood Productions
- Distributed by: Jin Chuan Pictures
- Release date: 13 November 2003
- Running time: 100 minutes
- Country: Hong Kong
- Languages: Cantonese; Mandarin

Hidden Track (尋找周杰倫) is a 2003 Hong Kong romance film directed by Audrey Lam and features an ensemble cast of Po Lok Tung, Shawn Yue, Daniel Wu, David Wu, Eason Chan, Emme Wong, Denise Ho, Ah Niu, and Jay Chou.

== Cast ==
- Po Lok-Tung - Pu Pu
- Shawn Yue - Yu Wenle
- Daniel Wu as Joe
- David Wu - Ng Dai-Wai
- Ah Niu - Chan Hing-Cheung
- Denise Ho - Wan-Si
- Eason Chan (Yik-Shun) - Chen Yixun
- Emme Wong - Yi-Man
- Tang Siu-Yun
- Jay Chou - Himself

== Plot ==
After her boyfriend ends their relationship. Pu Pu asks to listen one last time to a song they shared, a hidden track by Jay Chou. She then travels to Hong Kong to stay with her sister and begins searching for the song. Along the way, she encounters several people as she navigates love and relationships. Although Jay Chou's music is central to the story, he makes only a brief appearance in the film.

== Awards ==
23rd Annual Hong Kong Film Award
• Nomination - Best New Artist (Po Lok-Tung)

== See also ==
- Hidden Track (EP)
