= Banqiao Stadium =

Stadium in Banqiao, New Taipei, Taiwan

- 板橋體育場
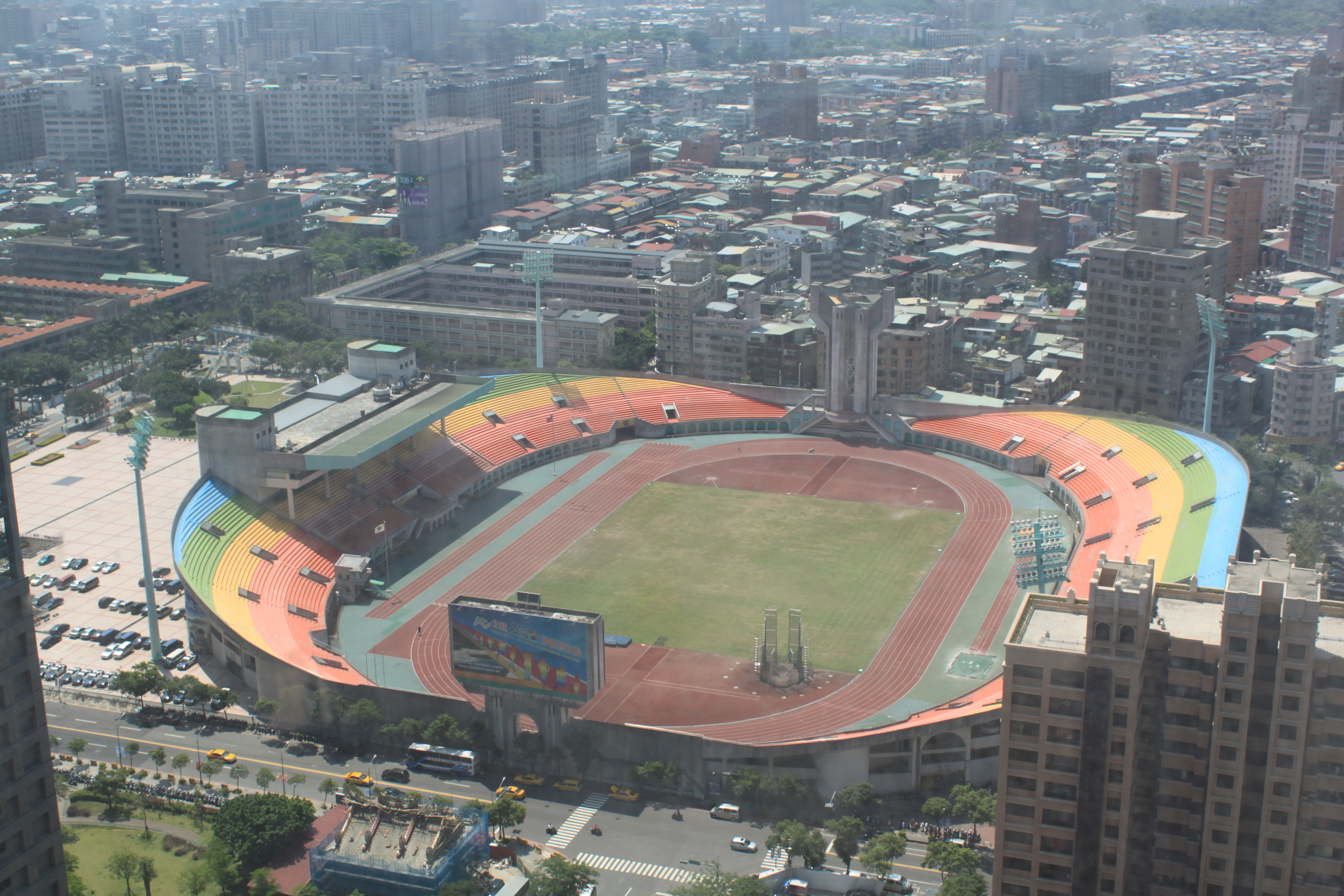
- Interactive map of Banqiao Stadium
- Location: Banqiao, New Taipei, Taiwan
- Coordinates: 25.010099°N 121.468276°E
- Capacity: 30,000
- Type: stadium

Construction
- Opened: 1987

The Banqiao Stadium (traditional Chinese: 板橋體育場; simplified Chinese: 板桥体育场; pinyin: Bǎnqiáo Tǐyùchǎng) is a multi-purpose stadium in Banqiao District, New Taipei, Taiwan. It is administered by the New Taipei City Government. It consists of several parts, of which the Banqiao First Stadium (Traditional Chinese: 板橋第一運動場) is able to hold 30,000 people and was opened in 1987. It is currently used mostly for football matches. In recent years, it has also been used for outdoor concerts. Guns N' Roses kicked off their 2009-2011 World Tour at the stadium on 11 December 2009.

== Transportation ==
The stadium is accessible within walking distance South East from Banqiao Station or South West from Banxin metro station.

== See also ==
- List of stadiums in Taiwan
