= Hidden Track (EP) =

EP by Jay Chou
- Released: 11 November 2003
- Recorded: 2003
- Genre: Mandopop
- Language: Mandarin
- Label: Sony, Alfa
- Producer: Jay Chou

Jay Chou chronology
Yeh Hui-Mei (2003)	Hidden Track (2003)	Common Jasmine Orange (2004)

Hidden Track (traditional Chinese: 尋找周杰倫; simplified Chinese: 寻找周杰伦; pinyin: Xúnzhǎo Zhōu JiéLún; lit. 'Looking for Jay Chou') is the second EP by Taiwanese singer Jay Chou, released on 11 November 2003 under label Alfa Music. The EP also serves as the sound track to the 2003 film on the same name.

The "vmp65l3 5. ru,6xjp6" on the EP cover corresponds to the Bopomofo for "Looking for Jay Chou" (Zhuyin Fuhao: ㄒㄩㄣˊ ㄓㄠˇ ㄓㄡ ㄐㄧㄝˊ ㄌㄨㄣˊ) when using the Bopomofo Chinese input method.

== Track listing ==
CD

1. "Orbit" (軌跡) – 5:22
2. "Broken String" (斷了的弦) – 4:53
3. "Orbit" (Instrumental) – 5:22
4. "Broken String" (Instrumental) – 4:53

DVD

1. "In the Name of Father" (以父之名)
2. "Coward" (懦夫)
3. "Sunny Day" (晴天)
4. "Class 3-2" (三年二班)
5. "East Wind Breaks" (東風破)
6. "You Hear Me" (妳聽得到)
7. "Same Tone" (同一種調調)
8. "Her Eyelashes" (她的睫毛)
9. "Cliff" (愛情懸崖)
10. "Terrace Field" (梯田)
11. "Double Blade" (雙刀)
