= Initial D (film) =

2005 Hong Kong film by Andrew Lau and Alan Mak

- Theatrical release poster
- Traditional Chinese: 頭文字D
- Simplified Chinese: 头文字D
- Hanyu Pinyin: Tóuwénzì D
- Jyutping: Tau4 Man4 Zi6 D
- Directed by: Andrew Lau; Alan Mak
- Screenplay by: Felix Chong
- Based on: Initial D by Shuichi Shigeno
- Produced by: Andrew Lau
- Starring: Jay Chou; Anne Suzuki; Edison Chen; Anthony Wong; Shawn Yue; Chapman To; Jordan Chan; Kenny Bee
- Cinematography: Lai Yiu-fai; Andrew Lau; Ng Man-Ching
- Edited by: Wong Hoi
- Music by: Chan Kwong-wing
- Production companies: Media Asia Films; Sil-Metropole Organisation; Basic Pictures
- Distributed by: Media Asia Distribution
- Release date: 23 June 2005
- Running time: 110 minutes
- Country: Hong Kong
- Language: Cantonese
- Budget: US$12 million
- Box office: US$10.8 million

Initial D is a 2005 Hong Kong action film directed by Andrew Lau and Alan Mak. It is a film adaptation of the Japanese manga series of the same name, combining elements from the series' several manga volumes as well as the anime's first, second, and third stages. The main character, Takumi Fujiwara, is portrayed by Jay Chou in his film acting debut.

== Plot ==
Takumi Fujiwara is a high school student who has been delivering tofu to the resorts in Mount Akina in his father Bunta's Toyota Sprinter Trueno AE86. He also works part-time at a gas station where his friend Itsuki, the owner's son and a high school dropout, aspires to be a street racer. Natsuki Mogi, an attractive classmate, smiles as she walks by Takumi, but she is an escort, who has been secretly going on dates with a sugar daddy who drives a Mercedes-Benz S-Class.

Street racers Takeshi Nakazato of the NightKids, who drives a Nissan Skyline GT-R VSpec II R32, and Ryosuke Takahashi of the RedSuns, who drives a Mazda Savanna RX-7 Type-R FC, talk about racing each other after they defeat the competition at Akina. When Takeshi visits the gas station to issue a challenge to the racing god of Mt. Akina, Itsuki (with Takumi riding along) arrives to defend that title, but in the ensuing race, Itsuki is embarrassed thoroughly and damages his Nissan Silvia. However, Takeshi is later beaten in an unofficial race by the AE86. Takeshi returns to the gas station to ask who owns the AE86. Yuichi asks Bunta if he has been racing again; he learns that Takumi has been driving the AE86 for the past five years and has been steadily improving his racing skills. Natsuki wants to go on a beach date with Takumi, so Bunta agrees to loan him the car and fill the gas tank provided that he wins the race at Akina.

Takumi defeats Takeshi in the downhill race in front of Ryosuke, Itsuki, and the other RedSuns and NightKids. Natsuki and Takumi enjoy a beach date. Takumi teaches Itsuki how to race a Trueno he has purchased. Halfway down the mountain, Seiji Iwaki of the Emperor Team in his Mitsubishi Lancer Evolution IV GSR, taunts them and angers Takumi to the point that he races and defeats Seiji, causing the latter to spin out and damage the side of his Evo.

Takumi discovers that Itsuki's car does not perform like his father's car, which Ryosuke tells him it has been custom-tuned and modified. Takumi agrees to race Ryosuke in three weeks, but on the way downhill, Emperor team leader Kyoichi Sudo in his Mitsubishi Lancer Evolution III RS overtakes Takumi; in the ensuing race, the AE86's engine breaks down. Ryosuke tells Takumi that he will challenge Kyoichi, and offers to lend him one of his cars, but Takumi declines. Bunta tells Takumi that Natsuki is visiting her hometown for two weeks. Bunta and Yuichi have the AE86 outfitted with a new Twin Cam 20-valve SilverTop AE101 racing engine. Takumi struggles with the modified car well until Bunta shows him how to take advantage of its new mechanics.

After seeing Natsuki with the Mercedes driver coming from a love hotel, Itsuki tells Takumi that Natsuki is a prostitute, which angers Takumi and they fight. The afternoon before the race he thinks he sees Natsuki in the Mercedes at a railroad crossing but is unable to catch up to them. He later calls Natsuki, who tells him she is coming back tonight but is with the Mercedes driver whom she tells they cannot see each other anymore.

At the showdown, Ryosuke offers to team with Takumi on defeating Kyoichi, but Takumi declines. During the race, Ryosuke lets Kyoichi pass him and then follows closely. Ryosuke and Takumi use the gutter trick to overtake Kyoichi. Despite the warning messages of a driver going up the hill, Kyoichi's Evo III tries to overtake the two but is forced to swerve off the road from the oncoming car and flips off the cliffside, totaling his Evo III. Ryosuke overtakes Takumi at the five hairpin turns. Bunta explains to the watchers that the FC's tires are losing their grip and that it is up to Takumi to compete against himself and not his opponent. Takumi undertakes Ryosuke on the last hairpin turn to win the race.

Ryosuke offers Takumi to join his new racing team, but Takumi goes to see Natsuki. However, he sees the Mercedes driver drop off Natsuki with a hug. Takumi and Natsuki see each other but Takumi runs away, while Natsuki falls to the ground crying. Takumi tearfully drives away. Takumi calls Itsuki to apologize and then calls Ryosuke to accept his offer to join Ryosuke’s new expedition team (Project D).

== Cast ==
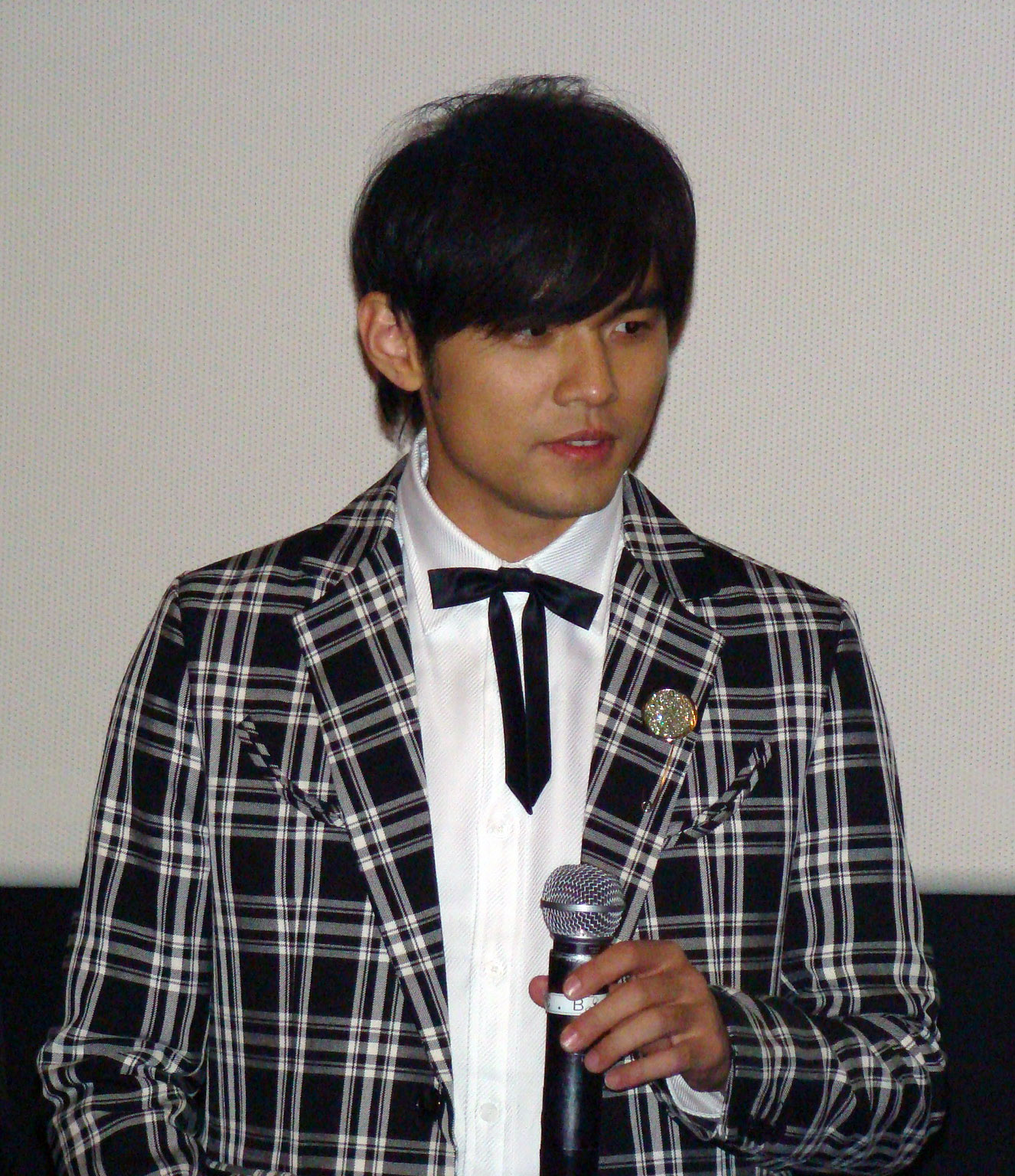
Jay Chou made his acting debut in Initial D.

- Jay Chou as Takumi Fujiwara
- Anne Suzuki as Natsuki Mogi, Takumi's classmate and love interest
- Edison Chen as Ryosuke Takahashi, leader of the RedSuns
- Anthony Wong as Bunta Fujiwara, Takumi's father, a former racer who now runs a tofu shop
- Shawn Yue as Takeshi Nakazato, leader of the NightKids
- Chapman To as Itsuki Tachibana, Takumi's friend and leader of the Akina SpeedStars. His father owns the gas station.
- Jordan Chan as Kyoichi Sudo, leader of Team Emperor
- Kenny Bee as Yuichi Tachibana, the gas station owner and Bunta's friend
- Tsuyoshi Abe as Kenji, one of the gas station attendants and a SpeedStars member
- Liu Keng Hung, as Seiji Iwaki, a member of Team Emperor
- Chie Tanaka as Miya, a female gas station attendant Itsuki dates
- Kazuyuki Tsumura as Mr. X, Natsuki's sugar daddy

== Production ==
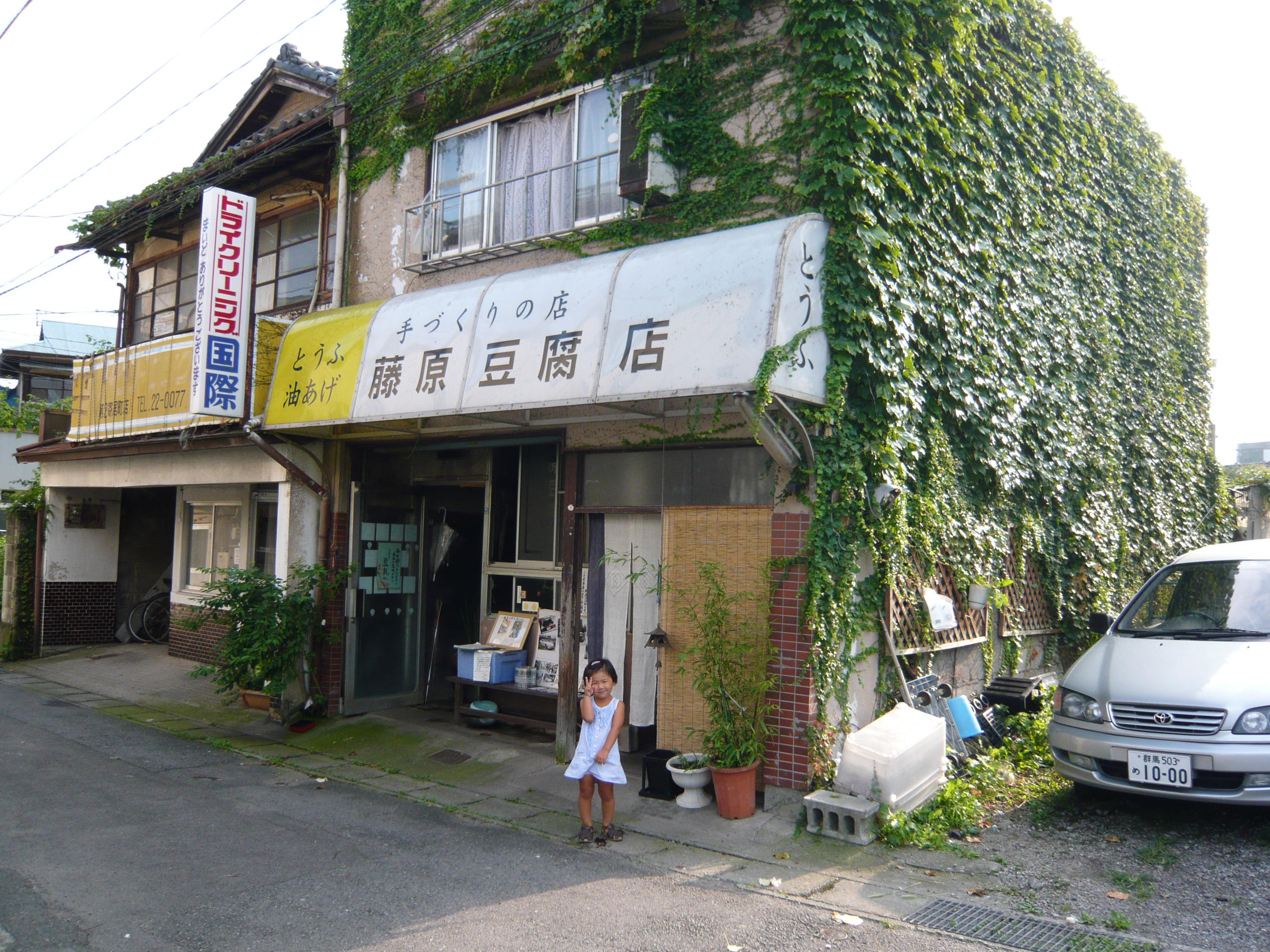
Fujino Store Tofu Shop in Gunma, which was renamed and modeled to Fujiwara Tofu Shop for the live-action film.

The Hong Kong, Taiwan, Japanese, American and British versions each have different soundtracks. The AAA song "Blood on Fire" (2005), the film's main theme song, sold 58,052 single units, grossing approximately ¥29.03 million. The Mink insert song "Beautiful" sold 2,786 units, grossing ¥2.93 million. The U.K. release of the film features an entirely different soundtrack composed and compiled by Richie Warren of Fuel.

== Release ==
Initial D was released on 23 June 2005 in several Asian markets including Hong Kong, Japan, Thailand, Singapore, South Korea, Taiwan and mainland China. In the Philippines, the film was released on 12 July 2006. In North America, the film screened at the Chicago International Film Festival on 15 October 2005 and had a limited run at the Imaginasian Theater in New York City on 30 December 2005.

In September 2025, the film received 4K digital restoration mastering to commemorate its 20th anniversary of release, led by L'Immagine Ritrovata Asia and Dolby Atmos sound remastering under supervision of directors Andrew Lau and Alan Mak and score composer Chan Kwong-Wing. The film was re-released on 17 September 2025.

The 20th Anniversary 4K Version of the film had special screening in the Filmmaker in Focus: Andrew Lau section of the 25th New York Asian Film Festival on 12 July 2026 as part of the 25th anniversary of the festival.

== Home media ==
Initial D was released as a direct to video DVD in Australia on 21 October 2005. It was released in the United Kingdom on 28 April, and the Philippines on 12 July 2006. Tai Seng Entertainment, the distributor of Initial D in the United States, released Initial D on Blu-ray on 22 January 2008. This is an exclusive release for the Blu-ray format which included an English dub.

In Japan, the DVD release sold 250,000 units, grossing approximately ¥998 million ($13 million) in video sales revenue.

== Critical reception ==
On review aggregator website Rotten Tomatoes, the film received an approval rating of 33% based on 6 reviews, with an average rating of 4.1/10.

== Accolades ==
Initial D won six awards out of 15 nominations from the 42nd Golden Horse Awards in 2005 and 25th Hong Kong Film Awards in 2006.

=== 42nd Golden Horse Awards ===
Category	Nomination	Result	Ref
Best Supporting Actor	Anthony Wong Chau-Sang	Won	
Best New Performer	Jay Chou	Won	
Best Adapted Screenplay	Felix Chong Man-Keung	Nominated	
Best Original Song	"飄移" (Drifting) by Jay Chou from November's Chopin	Nominated	
Best Visual Effects	Victor Wong, Eddy Wong, Bryan Cheung	Nominated	
Best Sound Effects	Kinson Tsang King-Cheung	Nominated	

=== 25th Hong Kong Film Awards ===
Category	Nomination	Result	Ref
Best Supporting Actor	Anthony Wong Chau-Sang	Won	
Best New Performer	Jay Chou	Won	
Best Sound Design	Kinson Tsang King-Cheung	Won	
Best Visual Effects	Victor Wong, Eddy Wong, Bryan Cheung	Won	
Best Film	Initial D	Nominated	
Best Director	Andrew Lau Wai-Keung, Alan Mak Siu-Fai	Nominated	
Best Editing	Wong Hoi	Nominated	
Best Original Score	Chan Kwong-Wing	Nominated	
Best Original Song	"飄移" (Drifting) by Jay Chou from November's Chopin	Nominated	

== Cancelled sequel ==
A sequel was being discussed after the release of the film, however, a concrete conclusion could not be reached due to obstacles that include the storyline, filming locations, casts, and safety reasons. In March 2014, director and producer, Andrew Lau, reconfirmed in an exclusive interview that a sequel would surely follow but is tight-lipped on the release date. Jay Chou and Edison Chen would reprise their roles from the first film. In 2018, Felix Chong, the screenwriter for the first film, stated that he and Lau previously had plans to develop the sequel but both have since moved onto other projects, citing production costs being too high due to Lau's insistence on using real cars instead of CGI. In 2020, director Andrew Lau stated that if a sequel is put into production he would likely not be directing it, citing the toll the first film took on his health, licensing issues, and once again budget issues, and also suggesting that Takumi should take on a mentor role similar to his father in the first film.

It was later revealed that the screenplay of the sequel was completed in 2020, and the production began procuring race cars. However, production was unable to secure the intellectual property rights from the publisher Kodansha, and the sequel has to be cancelled.
