= True Legend =

2010 Chinese-Hong Kong film by Yuen Woo-ping

- Promotional poster
- 苏乞儿
- Directed by: Yuen Woo-ping
- Written by: Christine To
- Produced by: Bill Kong; Zhang Zhenyang
- Starring: Vincent Zhao; Zhou Xun; Jay Chou; Michelle Yeoh; Andy On; David Carradine; Guo Xiaodong; Feng Xiaogang; Cung Le; Gordon Liu; Bryan Leung; Jacky Heung
- Cinematography: Zhao Xiaoding
- Edited by: Wenders Li
- Music by: Shigeru Umebayashi
- Distributed by: EDKO Films
- Release dates: 9 February 2010 (China); 11 February 2010 (Hong Kong)
- Running time: 115 minutes
- Countries: China; Hong Kong
- Language: Mandarin
- Budget: US$20,000,000
- Box office: RMB 46.5 million

True Legend (苏乞儿) is a 2010 Chinese–Hong Kong martial arts film directed by Yuen Woo-ping, his first since Tai Chi Boxer (1996). A Chinese-Hong Kong co-production, the film starred Vincent Zhao as Chinese folk hero Su Can, and co-starred Zhou Xun, Jay Chou, and Andy On. Gordon Liu, Leung Kar-yan, Michelle Yeoh, and David Carradine make cameo appearances. Set in late 19th-century and early 20th-century China, the film follows a retired general whose peaceful life is interrupted when his vengeful sworn brother returns from war armed with a deadly skill. Weakened but not destroyed, he learns drunken boxing from the God of Wushu to defeat his sworn brother.

The film has been shown in both 2D and 3D, and was promoted as the first Chinese 3D film. It was released in the United States on 13 May 2011 by Indomina, grossing US$62,200 during its run. Though it was a rather large financial loss for producer Bill Kong, making only RMB 46.5 million (US$6.82 million) against an estimated budget of US$20 million, the film received generally positive reviews from critics, particularly for its action choreography. True Legend was awarded the Lotus Action Asia at the 13th Deauville Asian Film Festival and won the Best Asian Action Movie award.

== Synopsis ==
Su Can, a former general, has retired from military service to focus on wushu. He has a tense relationship with his sworn brother Yuan Lie, who is jealous of him. Years ago, Su's father had killed Yuan's father when the latter had fallen to evil. Su's father has since adopted Yuan, but fears that the boy might follow in his father's footsteps.

Five years later, Su has married Yuan's sister Ying and they have a son Feng. Yuan has also returned to serve as a governor, and he kills Su's father in revenge. When Su confronts Yuan, the latter defeats and wounds him before throwing him down a waterfall. Ying jumps into the water in an attempt to save Su, and both of them are lost. Yuan then takes custody of Feng.

Ying and Su survive their fall and are saved by a healer. Su is devastated to learn that he is crippled and turns to alcohol to drown his sorrows. Later, with Ying's support, he recovers, relearns martial arts and spars with an imaginary "God of Wushu". He eventually faces Yuan in battle and saves Feng, but Ying dies after being buried alive on Yuan's order.

Su becomes insane after losing his wife and roams the streets with his son. During this time, he picks up drunken boxing from sparring with the "God of Wushu", and regains his sanity. Later, he meets an old comrade and gets involved in a fighting arena, defeating some foreign challengers with his newly mastered skills.

== Cast ==
- Vincent Zhao as Su Can
- Zhou Xun as Yuan Ying
- Jay Chou as the God of Wushu
- Michelle Yeoh as Yu Shulian
- Andy On as Yuan Lie
- David Carradine as Anton
- Guo Xiaodong as Colonel Ma
- Feng Xiaogang as the pickpocket
- Cung Le as a militia leader
- Gordon Liu as the Old Sage
- Bryan Leung as Su Wankun
- Jacky Heung as a prince
- Yan Ni as the bar owner
- Will Liu as Iron Lad
- Jiang Luxia as Iron Maiden
- Li Zo as Feng (age 5)
- Suen Han-wen as Feng (age 8)
- Conan Stevens as Malotoff
- Jon Heidenreich as a fighter
- Sylvester Terkay as the older Scot brother
- Matt Wiese as the younger Scot brother
- Dominique Vandenberg as Bald One-Eye

== Production ==
When director Yuen Woo-ping was given the script by producer Bill Kong, the latter reportedly recommended Vincent Zhao for the lead role, saying that Zhao had been acting in many television series in recent years and should appear more in films. Yuen, after looking through some of Zhao's older films, chose him for the lead role. To prepare for his role, Zhao lost up to 9 kilograms (20 lb) as "Beggar Su can't be too plump." Zhao also had to take breakdancing classes for about two months as Yuen wanted a more rhythmic and modern form of drunken boxing.

Yuen also initially wanted Feng Xiaogang to portray the Old Sage but Feng turned down the offer due to schedule conflicts. However, Feng had the chance to direct a scene in the film where he appeared as a pickpocket teaching Su Can's son to steal. Nevertheless, the scene never made it into the film's final cut as Yuen and the producers felt that it was unnecessary.

True Legend began shooting in the mountainous region in a suburb of Beijing on August 28, 2008. Filming wrapped up in late January 2009. The set of the scene in which Su Can saves the prince broke a record for the largest set ever built inside a Chinese filming studio. The shooting lasted five months. While still in pre-production, Yuen and his staff took more than four months to scout for possible shooting locations. They eventually selected Huangshan, the Hukou Waterfalls, and traditional Hui-style residences in Anhui. Yuen preferred to shoot the film in their original buildings instead of in replicas in sound stages.

The scene in which Andy On and Vincent Zhao fight at the Hukou Waterfalls was the hardest fight scene to shoot in the entire film. As Yuen stated,

"The safety issue for that scene was the biggest challenge of the whole movie. The landscape looks magnificent but are very dangerous; there was no chance for us to make any mistakes. We meticulously planned out the whole choreography and tested and rehearsed it for many times before rolling the camera. We also double-wired our talent just to make sure they were completely safe. This fighting sequence took us 15 working days to complete."

The film's action choreography received both praise and ridicule, with some saying that it was unmemorable. Despite this, Yuen explained that "if it's too fanciful, the audience won't be able to see all the moves clearly." Instead, he wanted to create a hybrid (traditional and modern) form of martial arts, thus Vincent Zhao incorporated breakdancing moves into drunken boxing in some of the fight scenes.

When asked why only 20 minutes of the film was in 3D, Yuen explained that making a full 3D film is very expensive and takes up a lot of human resources. He added that he hired up to 100 digital artists, who took about six months to convert the two most important action scenes into 3D. Despite his efforts, a number of countries which bought the distribution rights did not release the film in 3D as it was too troublesome for movie theatre staff to inform the audience when to put on and remove the 3D glasses.

Jay Chou also helped with designing some of the outfits.

== DVD release ==
On October 25, 2010, DVD was released in Optimum Home Entertainment in Europe in Region 2.

== Reception ==
On review aggregator website Rotten Tomatoes, the film has an approval rating of 63% based on 38 reviews. The film has a score of 62 out of 100 on Metacritic, based on 10 reviews.

The film was awarded the Lotus Action Asia at the 13th Deauville Asian Film Festival and won the Best Asian Action Movie award.

Reviewer Charlie Jane Anders of Gizmodo praised the film as "pure old-school awesomeness", comparing it to Crouching Tiger, Hidden Dragon (2000) and Hero (2002).

Reviewer Peter Bradshaw of The Guardian gave True Legend 2 out of 5 stars, writing that it "boasts some great action scenes. But otherwise it's a slightly plodding account of Chinese myth and legend."

In a review of True Legend for The New York Times, reviewer Mike Hale wrote, "Like so many of the bloated, moralistic epics being pumped out by the Chinese film industry, it maneuvers cardboard characters through a story built almost entirely from aphorisms, scheming and pledges of revenge."
