= Common Jasmine Orange =

Studio album by Jay Chou
- Released: 3 August 2004
- Recorded: 2003–2004
- Studio: Alfa Studio (Taipei)
- Genres: R&B; soft rock; pop
- Length: 42:30
- Language: Mandarin
- Label: Alfa Music
- Producer: Jay Chou

Jay Chou chronology
Hidden Track (2003)	Common Jasmine Orange (2004)	2004 Incomparable Concert (2005)

Alternative cover
- 2009 Chinese reissue cover

Singles from Common Jasmine Orange
- 1. "Common Jasmine Orange" Released: 29 December 2003; 2. "Wounds of War" Released: 17 April 2004; 3. "Step Aside" Released: 3 August 2004; 4. "Excuse" Released: 3 August 2004

Common Jasmine Orange (Chinese: 七里香; pinyin: Qī Lǐ Xiāng) is the fifth studio album by Taiwanese recording artist Jay Chou. It was released 3 August 2004, by Alfa Music. The album's lyrics were written by a team of songwriters including Chou, the singer's frequent collaborator Vincent Fang, Alang Huang, Devon Song, and Will Liu, whilst composition was handled entirely by Chou himself. The album was recorded and mixed in Taipei, while the string accompaniment parts were recorded in Beijing.

Musically, the material of Common Jasmine Orange spans R&B, soft rock, and pop genres with influences from traditional Chinese and Japanese music. Chou envisioned himself as a narrator in the record, offering his personal narratives through lyrics which incorporate themes such as romance and war. The artwork for the album's cover sleeve was shot in Vladivostok, Russia, and features Chou donning a military uniform in front of an abandoned structure with a young girl standing in front of him.

Critics appreciated the musical styles of Common Jasmine Orange and its usage of traditional elements. It saw commercial success across Asia, peaking atop the album charts in Singapore and Malaysia upon release. In Taiwan, it sold more than 320,000 copies and was the highest-selling album of 2004. Common Jasmine Orange saw major commercial success in China; according to Guinness World Records, it is the best-selling physical album in China in the 21st century. According to the IFPI, the album was the 43rd best-selling album of 2004 globally.

The album produced singles such as the title track "Common Jasmine Orange", which premiered on radio stations in several Asian countries on 21 July 2004. Other singles include "Wounds of War", "Step Aside", and "Excuse", while music videos were produced for all ten tracks on the record. Chou promoted the album by embarking on the Incomparable Tour after the release of the album, which began in Taipei on 2 October 2004, and concluded in Tokyo on 6 February 2006.

== Background and development ==
Confident of the album's music and wanting the listener to focus on the music, Chou positioned the album as a return to the purity of music and titled the album with the lead single "Common Jasmine Orange." Chou composed all of the songs in Common Jasmine Orange. Half of the lyrics were penned by the singer's frequent collaborator Vincent Fang, while the remaining tracks were written by Chou, Alang Huang, Devon Song, and Will Liu. G-Power and sound engineer Gary Yang also worked on the record, both of whom were members of Nan Quan Mama. Chou positioned himself as a storyteller in the album, and presented his stories and imagined scenes to the audience through music.

On 4 June 2004, it was revealed that Chou would release a new album on 28 July; Chou said frankly that he hopes to bring his music to the overseas music scene, saying: "I hope that people abroad, not just in Asia, can know my music. Why can't Chinese music perform on the world stage? I hope that one day Chinese music can become the world's mainstream music." On 8 June 2004, it was revealed that he postponed the release of the album to August 2004. On 24 June, the album was reported to be completed.

=== Title and artwork ===
The romanized name of the album "Qilixiang" comes from the work "Qilixiang" by the famous poet Xi Murong. The album cover was envisioned to be shot in a location that exudes vitality. After a careful selection process, Vladivostok, Russia was chosen as the location for the album cover shoot. Chou donned a military uniform while a young Russian girl holding a stuffed animal was positioned in front of him. The singer specifically chose Vladivostok as the location of the shoot due to the city's historical association with war and its slightly poignant aesthetic.

== Composition ==
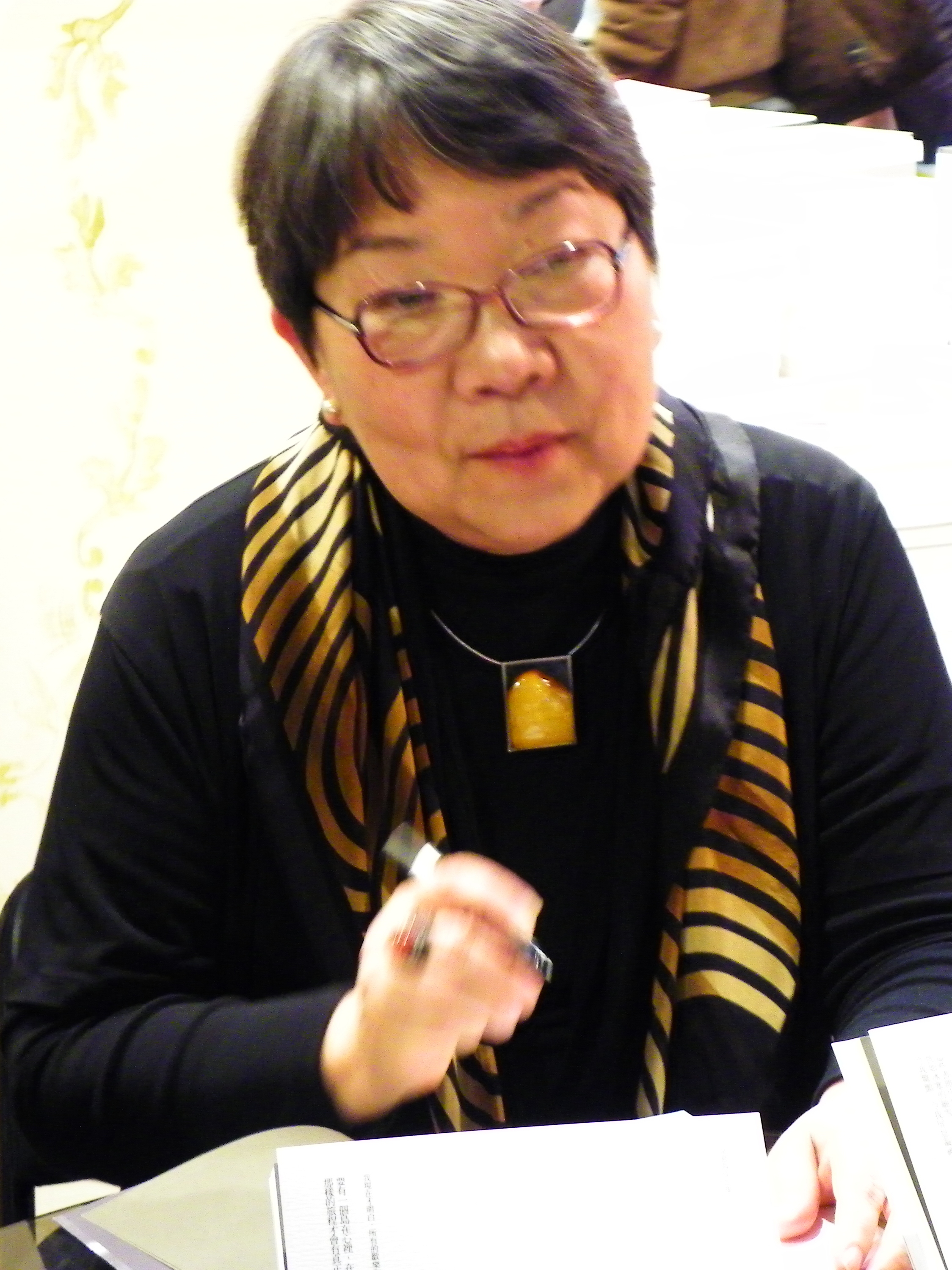
The album's title track was inspired by a poem from Xi Murong (pictured)

In Common Jasmine Orange, Chou adopts the persona of a storyteller, using music as a medium to share his narratives and imaginative visuals with his listeners. "My Territory" is a song that blends Chinese folk music instrumentation with electronic music beats and mixed sound effects. "Common Jasmine Orange" is a Chinese-style poetic love song that was inspired by the poem Seven Miles of Fragrance by Xi Murong. Commentators have described the song as a romantic summer number that captures the feelings one gets from a love interest. "Excuse" is a usual "Chou-style" love song accompanied by piano. "Grandma" was written by Chou and is a heartfelt tribute to the elderly; in the process of writing the song, Chou expressed discontent with certain award ceremonies. "General" contains long sections of rapping, a multi-part chorus, and a folk-flavored instrumental, all of which are essential elements of Chou's music.

"Step Aside" is a power ballad accompanied by piano and strings. The song "Chaotic Dance" draws creative inspiration from the historical events of the Three Kingdoms in the late Eastern Han Dynasty. "Struggle" features a rock orchestration, and the song is an attempt by Chou to break new ground, both in terms of the band's accompaniment and the style of the song. "Fun Fair" is an R&B style love song. "Wounds of War" is a melancholic piano based song written during the early stages of the Iraq War.

== Release and promotion ==
On 16 July 2004, it was announced that pre-orders for Common Jasmine Orange would start the following week. On 18 July 2004, it was announced that the album would be released on 3 August. The album was made available for pre-order on 21 July 2004; the album's title track was also premiered simultaneously on 50 radio stations across Asia that day. At a press conference on 5 August 2004, the record company announced that the sales orders in Asia exceeded 1,000,000 copies on the day of the album's release, and held a special "ice-breaking ceremony" to congratulate the album's good performance.

== Singles and music videos ==
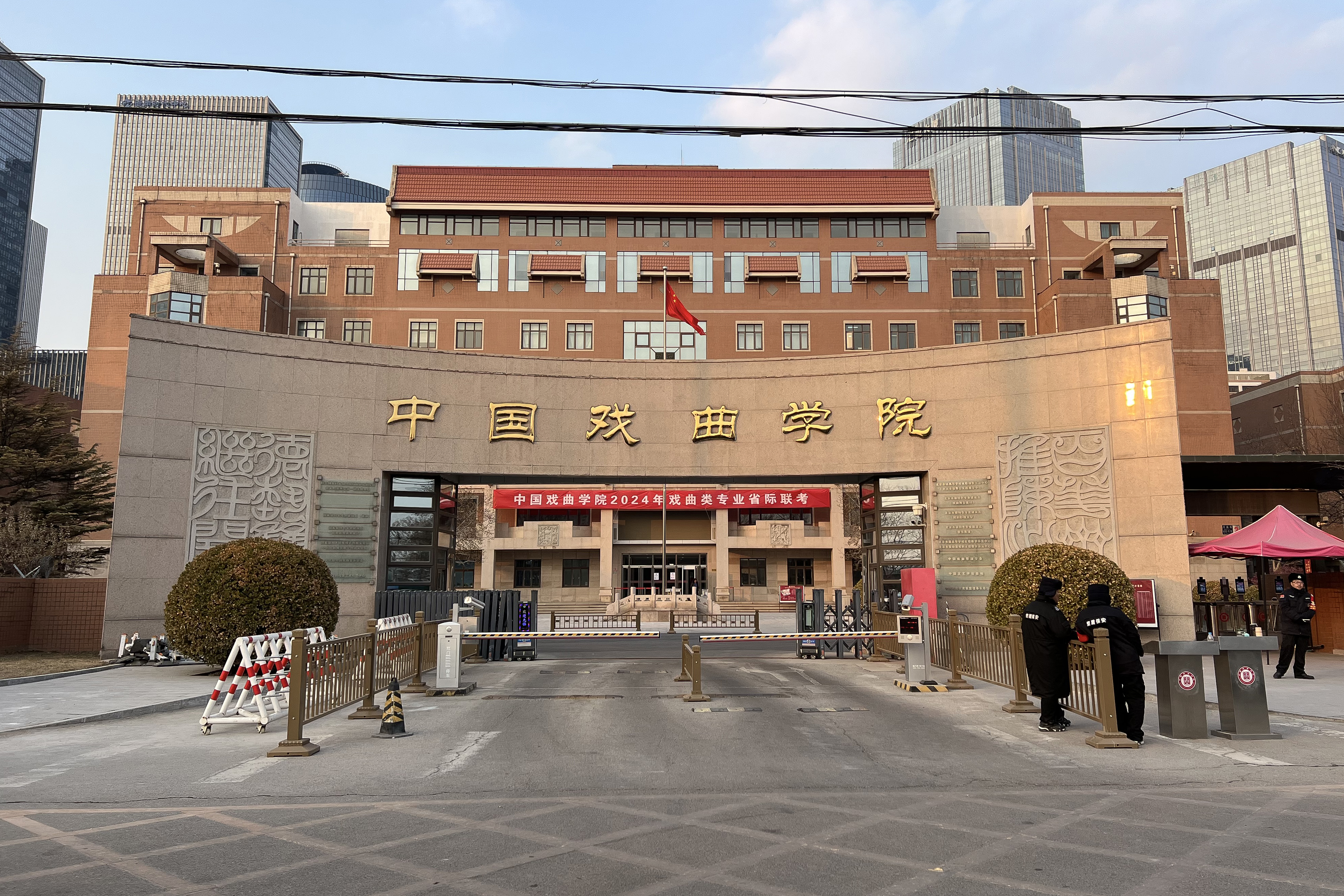
National Academy of Chinese Theatre Arts, the filming location of the music video for "My Territory"

The song "My Territory" was specially created by Chou for the advertising song of China Mobile's M-Zone. The music video for "My Territory" was filmed at the high school attached to the National Academy of Chinese Theatre Arts; due to Chou's appearance, the filming site attracted many teachers and students from the school. Due to the large number of onlookers, the camera was not properly adjusted several times. The video was directed by Kuang Sheng and tells the story of Chou's deep friendship with his classmates who were also sent to opera schools when they were young. The music video for the album's title track was directed by Kuang Sheng, filmed in Takasaki, Gunma Prefecture, Japan, and stars Chie Tanaka; the video depicts them falling in love, running hand in hand in the garden and swinging on the swing.

The video for "Excuse" was directed by Kuang Sheng and filmed in the alleys of Vladivostok's busiest shopping street; Chou acted as a street performer in the video, becoming the lead singer and guitarist of a band, and invited local Vladivostok bands to perform with him. The music video for "Grandma" was filmed at the bank of the Tamsui River and an old restaurant, directed by Kuang Sheng and featured Chou's grandmother, mother Yeh Hui-Mei and cousin. In the music video for "General," which was directed by Xu Renfeng, a young man and an old man are playing chess; the process is exciting, as if it is a real war, like a duel between a vigorous young general and an experienced old general.

Kuang Sheng directed the music video for "Step Aside," which portrays Chou as a hospital janitor who fell in love with a very beautiful patient. The background of the music video of "Chaotic Dance" is the Three Kingdoms period, so in the video, Chou wears ancient costumes and braids, dressing up as a man from the Central Plains; the video was directed by Kuang Sheng. In the Kuang Sheng-directed music video for "Struggle," Liu Genghong plays a big star and Chou plays his driver. The music video for "Fun Fair" was shot in a carnival, with scenes of Jay Chou being playful with his love interest. The music video for "Wounds of War" was directed by Kuang Sheng and filmed in Vladivostok, and 15 local soldiers and 40 children were invited to perform. On 6 January 2005, the tracks "Common Jasmine Orange", "Excuse" and "Wounds of War", were listed at number 1, number 10, and number 88 respectively on the 2004 Hit FM Top 100 Singles of the Year chart.

== Critical reception ==
Professional ratings
Review scores
Source	Rating
MTVChinese.com	4/5 stars
Sputnikmusic	4/5 stars

Apin of MTVChinese.com awarded the album four stars out of five, saying that the whole album is far more pleasant to listen to than its predecessor, Yeh Hui-Mei. About Common Jasmine Orange in its entirety, he stated: "It’s not good or bad, I just feel that every song in this album is relatively low-key and not deliberately eye-catching." Sputnikmusic gave the album a strongly positive review that portrayed Common Jasmin Orange as a complex, emotionally expressive, stylistically varied Jay Chou album that flows more cohesively than Yeh Hui Mei. The reviewer praised Chou as a mysterious, intellectually compelling artist who blends Western and Asian influences while avoiding shallow pop conventions. Phoenix News's Zhang Yi commented: "Common Jasmine Orange is Jay Chou's album with the most abundant musical levels so far. Almost every song has been arranged with great effort, and even the slow songs have many levels!"

In 2020, to celebrate Chou's 20th anniversary in the industry, NetEase conducted a ranking of Chou's best albums, with Common Jasmine Orange being placed fourth on the list. Tencent Music's Wave Review Panel ranked Yeh Hui-Mei 3rd place in their list of the "200 Best Chinese Albums of 2001–2020", appreciating the record for showing the beauty of oriental music to the world with full imagination.

== Commercial performance ==
Common Jasmine Orange achieved commercial success throughout Asia. In Singapore, the album peaked at number one on the Recording Industry Association Singapore (RIAS) album chart in the issue dated 21 August 2004, and remained atop the chart for multiple weeks. It was Chou's fourth consecutive album to reach number one in Singapore. In Malaysia, it peaked at number one on the Recording Industry Association of Malaysia (RIM) Chinese album chart in the issue dated 24 August 2004. In Taiwan, it was the best-selling album of the year according to domestic news publications with sales of 320,000 copies, making it the singer's fourth consecutive best-selling album of the year after Fantasy (2001), The Eight Dimensions (2002) and Yeh Hui-Mei (2003).

In China, Common Jasmine Orange saw major commercial success. According to Guinness World Records, it is the best-selling physical album released during the 21st century in China with sales of over 2,600,000 copies. The International Federation of the Phonographic Industry (IFPI) ranked the album at number 43 on their list of the best-selling albums worldwide during 2004. It went on to sell over 3,500,000 copies throughout Asia.

== Accolades ==
Common Jasmine Orange earned six nominations at the 16th Golden Melody Awards. The album won an IFPI Hong Kong Top Sales Music Award for Best Selling Mandarin Album of the Year. In 2004, the song "Common Jasmine Orange" won three awards at the Hong Kong TVB8 Top Ten Golden Songs Awards: Best Composition, Best Producer, and Best Arranger. In 2005, "Common Jasmine Orange" was placed on the leaderboard of the Top 10 song awards at the 2004 RTHK Top 10 Gold Songs Awards and won the Outstanding Chinese Pop Song Award, while Chou won the Silver Award for National Most Popular Male Singer. The song won the 11th China Music Awards's Best Song of the Year and many other awards. In 2005, the song "General" won the Top Ten Outstanding Singles Award from the Chinese Musicians Exchange Association.

== Track listing ==
All music is composed by Jay Chou.

Common Jasmine Orange track listing
No.	Title	Lyrics	Length
1.	"My Territory" (我的地盤; Wǒ de dìpán)	Vincent Fang	4:00
2.	"Common Jasmine Orange" (七里香; Qī lǐ xiāng)	Vincent Fang	4:55
3.	"Excuse" (藉口; Jièkǒu)	Jay Chou	4:16
4.	"Grandma" (外婆; Wàipó)	Jay Chou	4:00
5.	"General" (將軍; Jiāngjūn)	Alang Huang	3:20
6.	"Step Aside" (擱淺; Gēqiǎn)	Devon Song	3:56
7.	"Chaotic Dance" (亂舞春秋; Luàn wǔ chūnqiū)	Vincent Fang	4:36
8.	"Struggle" (困獸之鬥; Kùn shòu zhī dòu)	Will Liu	4:25
9.	"Fun Fair" (園遊會; Yuán yóu huì)	Vincent Fang	4:11
10.	"Wounds of War" (止戰之殤; Zhǐ zhàn zhī shāng)	Vincent Fang	4:34
Total length:			42:30

== Charts ==
=== Weekly charts ===
Chart (2004)	Peak position
Malaysian Albums (RIM)	1
Singaporean Albums (RIAS)	1

=== Year-end charts ===
Chart (2004)	Position
Taiwanese Albums (Note: Best-selling albums of the year in Taiwan as reported by media outlets)	1

== Sales ==
Region	Certification	Certified units/sales
China	—	2,600,000
Taiwan	—	300,000

== See also ==
- List of best-selling albums in China
