= Fearless (Jay Chou EP) =

EP by Jay Chou
- Released: 20 January 2006
- Recorded: 2005
- Genre: Mandopop
- Language: Mandarin
- Label: Alfa Music，Sony BMG
- Producer: Jay Chou

Jay Chou chronology
| November's Chopin (2005) | Fearless (2006) | Still Fantasy (2006) |

Fearless (Chinese: 霍元甲; pinyin: Huò Yuánjiǎ) is the third EP by Taiwanese singer Jay Chou, released on 20 January 2006 by Alfa Music and Sony BMG. Its first track serves as the ending theme for the film of the same name.

== Track listing ==
1. "Fearless" (霍元甲)
2. "Face the World" (獻世) (Cantonese) (Original artist: Jordan Chan)

Bonus MVs from November's Chopin

1. "Nocturne" (夜曲)
2. "Blue Storm" (藍色風暴)
3. "Hair Like Snow" (發如雪)
4. "Black Sweater" (黑色毛衣)
5. "Besieged From All Sides" (四面楚歌)
6. "Maple" (楓)
7. "Romantic Cellphone" (浪漫手機)
8. "Reverse Scale" (逆鱗)
9. "Malt Candy" (麥芽糖)
10. "Coral Sea" (珊瑚海)
11. "Drifting" (飄移)
12. "All the Way North" (一路向北)

== Awards ==
| Award | Category | Nominated work | Result |
|---|---|---|---|
| Golden Medley Awards | Best Single Producer | Jay Chou for "Fearless" | Won |
| Golden Medley Awards | Best Musical Arranger | Eric Hong for "Fearless" | Nominated |
