= Will Liu =

Taiwanese singer and actor (born 1972)

- Born: Liú Gēnghóng; 7 October 1972 (age 54); Kaohsiung, Taiwan
- Occupations: Singer; actor
- Years active: 2005–present
- Spouse: Vivi Wang (m. 2007)
- Children: 3

Chinese name
- Traditional Chinese: 劉畊宏
- Simplified Chinese: 刘畊宏
Transcriptions
Standard Mandarin
- Hanyu Pinyin: Liú Gēnghóng
Southern Min
- Hokkien POJ: Lâu Keng-hông
- Musical career
- Genre: Mandopop
- Instrument: Vocals
- Label: Sony BMG (2005–present)
- Formerly of: S.B.D.W

Will Liu (Chinese: 劉畊宏; pinyin: Liú Gēnghóng; Pe̍h-ōe-jī: Lâu Keng-hông) (born 7 October 1972) is a Taiwanese singer and actor from Kaohsiung. He has released the albums Caihong Tiantang (彩虹天堂) [2005] and City of Angels (天使之城) [2007] and was formerly a member of the boy band S.B.D.W, along with Jacky Wu.

As an actor, he has appeared in the films Initial D (2005), Kung Fu Dunk (2008), The Treasure Hunter (2009), True Legend (2010), and Unbeatable (2013), among others.

== Selected filmography ==
List of appearances, with year, title, and role shown
Year	Title	Role	Notes
2005	Initial D	Seiji Iwaki	
2008	Kung Fu Dunk	Li Tian	
2009	The Treasure Hunter	Friday	
2010	True Legend	Iron Lad	
2013	Unbeatable	Rock Kong	
2019	Super Penguin League	Himself	Season 2
