= The Era World Tour =

2010–2011 concert tour by Jay Chou

- Tour by Jay Chou
- Associated album: The Era
- Start date: June 11, 2010
- End date: December 18, 2011
- No. of shows: 46

Jay Chou concert chronology
- The World Tour (2007–08); The Era World Tour (2010–11); Opus Jay World Tour (2013–15)

The Era World Tour (Chinese: 超时代) was the fifth concert tour by Taiwanese recording artist Jay Chou, held in support of his tenth studio album The Era (2010). The tour visited various countries including Taiwan, China, Singapore, Malaysia, Canada and the United States from June 2010 to December 2011.

A live album of the tour recorded during the first concert in Taipei was released on January 25, 2011.

== Production ==
=== Stage design ===
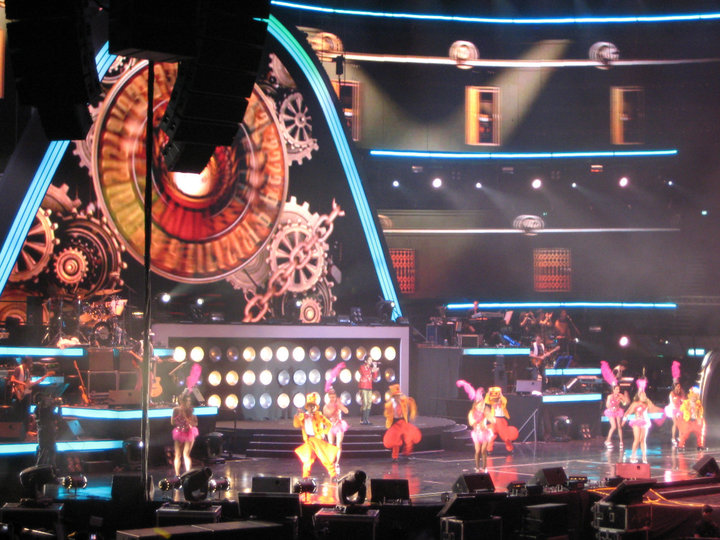
The Era World Tour in Singapore

The stage design for The Era World Tour combined elements of avant-garde futurism and medieval aesthetics. Chou appeared as a time-traveler navigating through dimensions of time and space, while the stage visuals conceptualized around the themes of a "future world" and a spaceship. The design also integrated elements such as "medieval century" and rock and roll.

As Chou's previous concerts in Taipei were mostly held outdoors, with the Era World Tour marking his debut performance at the Taipei Arena. Chou utilized new visual effects for the concerts, integrating projection art content with the use of over 2,000 LEDs and "360-degree floating stereoscopic imaging," which projected a three-dimensional image into the air from all directions, offering fans an immersive 360-degree viewing experience. These visual effects created the illusion of Chou traversing different times and spaces.

== Tour dates ==
List of tour dates
Date	City	Country	Venue	Attendance
June 11, 2010	Taipei	Taiwan	Taipei Arena	—
June 12, 2010	Taipei	Taiwan	Taipei Arena	—
June 13, 2010	Taipei	Taiwan	Taipei Arena	—
June 25, 2010	Shanghai	China	Shanghai Stadium	50,000
July 3, 2010	Beijing	China	Workers' Stadium	50,000
July 10, 2010	Tianjin	China	Tianjin Olympic Centre Stadium	—
July 17, 2010	Changzhou	China	Changzhou Olympic Sports Centre Stadium	—
July 23, 2010	Singapore		Singapore Indoor Stadium	—
July 24, 2010	Singapore		Singapore Indoor Stadium	—
July 25, 2010	Singapore		Singapore Indoor Stadium	—
July 31, 2010	Qingdao	China	Yizhong Sports Center	—
September 4, 2010	Zhengzhou	China	Henan Province Sports Centre	50,000
September 12, 2010	Xi'an	China	Shaanxi iRENA	—
September 16, 2010	Hong Kong		Hong Kong Coliseum	—
September 17, 2010	Hong Kong		Hong Kong Coliseum	—
September 18, 2010	Hong Kong		Hong Kong Coliseum	—
September 19, 2010	Hong Kong		Hong Kong Coliseum	—
September 21, 2010	Hong Kong		Hong Kong Coliseum	—
September 22, 2010	Hong Kong		Hong Kong Coliseum	—
September 23, 2010	Hong Kong		Hong Kong Coliseum	—
September 24, 2010	Hong Kong		Hong Kong Coliseum	—
September 26, 2010	Hefei	China	Hefei Olympic Sports Centre Stadium	—
September 30, 2010	Nanjing	China	Nanjing Olympic Sports Centre Stadium	—
October 16, 2010	Wuhan	China	Wuhan Sports Center Stadium	—
October 23, 2010	Chengdu	China	Chengdu Sports Centre Stadium	—
October 30, 2010	Fuzhou	China	Fuzhou Stadium	—
November 6, 2010	Chongqing	China	Chongqing Olympic Sports Centre Stadium	—
November 13, 2010	Hangzhou	China	Yellow Dragon Sports Centre Stadium	—
November 20, 2010	Ningbo	China	Ningbo Sports Centre Stadium	—
December 23, 2010	Vancouver	Canada	Rogers Arena	—
December 31, 2010	San Jose	United States	HP Pavilion at San Jose	—
January 8, 2011	Los Angeles	United States	Los Angeles Memorial Sports Arena	—
January 15, 2011	Guangzhou	China	Tianhe Stadium	—
March 4, 2011	Kuala Lumpur	Malaysia	Putra Indoor Stadium	—
March 5, 2011	Kuala Lumpur	Malaysia	Putra Indoor Stadium	—
April 29, 2011	Luoyang	China	Luoyang Sports Centre Stadium	—
May 1, 2011	Jinan	China	Jinan Olympic Sports Centre Stadium	—
June 25, 2011	Changsha	China	He Long Stadium	—
July 16, 2011	Nantong	China	Nantong Stadium	—
August 27, 2011	Shenyang	China	Shenyang Olympic Sports Centre Stadium	—
September 11, 2011	Suzhou	China	Suzhou Sports Center	—
September 17, 2011	Shenzhen	China	Shenzhen Stadium	—
September 30, 2011	Dalian	China	Jinzhou Stadium	—
November 5, 2011	Jiangyin	China	Jiangyin Stadium	—
December 17, 2011	Kaohsiung	Taiwan	Kaohsiung Arena	—
December 18, 2011	Kaohsiung	Taiwan	Kaohsiung Arena	—
Total				N/A

== Live album ==
The Era 2010 World Tour

Live album by Jay Chou
- Released: January 25, 2011
- Recorded: June 11, 2010
- Venue: Taipei Arena
- Genre: Mandopop
- Language: Mandarin
- Label: JVR Music

Jay Chou chronology
The Era (2010)	The Era 2010 World Tour (2011)	Wow! (2011)

The Era 2010 World Tour (simplified Chinese: 超时代; traditional Chinese: 超時代) is the fourth live album by Taiwanese singer Jay Chou, released on January 25, 2011, by JVR Music and included a date filmed at Taipei Arena on June 11, 2010, from The Era World Tour.

=== Track listing ===
DVD

1. "Opening"
2. "Dragon Knight" (龍戰騎士)
3. "The Era" (跨時代)
4. "Snake Dance" (蛇舞) feat. Lara Veronin
5. "Love Before the Century" (愛在西元前)
6. "I'm Not Worthy Enough" (我不配)
7. "Hip-hop Stewardess" (嘻哈空姐)
8. "William Castle" (威廉古堡)
9. "Magician" (魔術先生)
10. "Black Humor" (黑色幽默) feat. Cindy Yen
11. "If I Think of You I'll Write You a Letter" (想你就寫信) performed by The Drifters
12. "You're My Bandaid" (你是我的OK繃) feat. The Drifters
13. "Fragrant Rice" (稻香)
14. "Sunshine Homeboy" (陽光宅男)
15. "Tornado" (龍捲風)
16. "Where's the Promised Happiness" (說好的幸福呢) / "Elimination" (淘汰) / "Blue and White Porcelain" (青花瓷)
17. "Free Tutorial Video" (免費教學錄影帶)
18. "Time Machine" (時光機)
19. "Dad, I've Come Back" (爸，我回來了) / "Who Knows My Mind" (心事無人知)
20. "It Rains All Night" (雨下一整夜)
21. "Diary: Fly for Love" (愛的飛行日記) feat. Gary Yang
22. “Superman VCR" (超人VCR)
23. "In Father's Name" (以父之名)
24. "Couldn't Say" (開不了口)
25. "Give Me Some Time for a Song" (給我一首歌的時間) feat. Jolin Tsai
26. "East Wind Breaks" (東風破)
27. "Nunchucks" (雙截棍)

CD 1

1. "Dragon Knight" (龍戰騎士)
2. "The Era" (跨時代)
3. "Snake Dance" (蛇舞) feat. Lara Veronin
4. "Love Before the Century" (愛在西元前)
5. "I'm Not Worthy Enough" (我不配)
6. "Hip-hop Stewardess" (嘻哈空姐)
7. "William Castle" (威廉古堡)
8. "Magician" (魔術先生)
9. "Black Humor" (黑色幽默) feat. Cindy Yen
10. "If I Think of You I'll Write You a Letter" (想你就寫信) performed by The Drifters
11. "You're My Bandaid" (你是我的OK繃) feat. The Drifters
12. "Fragrant Rice " (稻香)
13. "Sunshine Homeboy" (陽光宅男)
14. "Tornado" (龍捲風)
15. "Where's the Promised Happiness" (說好的幸福呢) / "Elimination" (淘汰) / "Blue and White Porcelain" (青花瓷)

CD 2

1. "Free Tutorial Video" (免費教學錄影帶)
2. "Time Machine" (時光機)
3. "Dad, I've Come Back" (爸，我回來了) / "Who Knows My Mind" (心事無人知)
4. "It Rains All Night" (雨下一整夜)
5. "Diary: Fly for Love" (愛的飛行日記) feat. Gary Yang
6. "In Father's Name" (以父之名)
7. "I Find It Hard to Say" (開不了口)
8. "East Wind Breaks" (東風破)
9. "Nunchucks" (雙截棍)
