= The World Tour (Jay Chou) =

2007–08 concert tour by Jay Chou

- Tour by Jay Chou
- Associated album: On the Run!
- Start date: November 10, 2007
- End date: August 28, 2009
- No. of shows: 42

Jay Chou concert chronology
- Incomparable Tour (2004–06); The World Tour (2007–08); The Era World Tour (2010–11)

The World Tour was the fourth concert tour by Taiwanese recording artist Jay Chou, held in support of his eighth studio album On the Run! (2007). The tour visited various countries including Taiwan, China, Singapore, Malaysia, Australia, Canada and the United States from November 2007 to August 2009.

== Concerts ==
On February 16, 2008, Chou became the second Mandopop artist to perform at the Nippon Budokan in Tokyo. In response to the 2008 Sichuan earthquake, the concert held in Chongqing on May 24, 2008, was changed to a charity fundraising concert. All proceeds from the concert were donated to the disaster area.

== Development ==
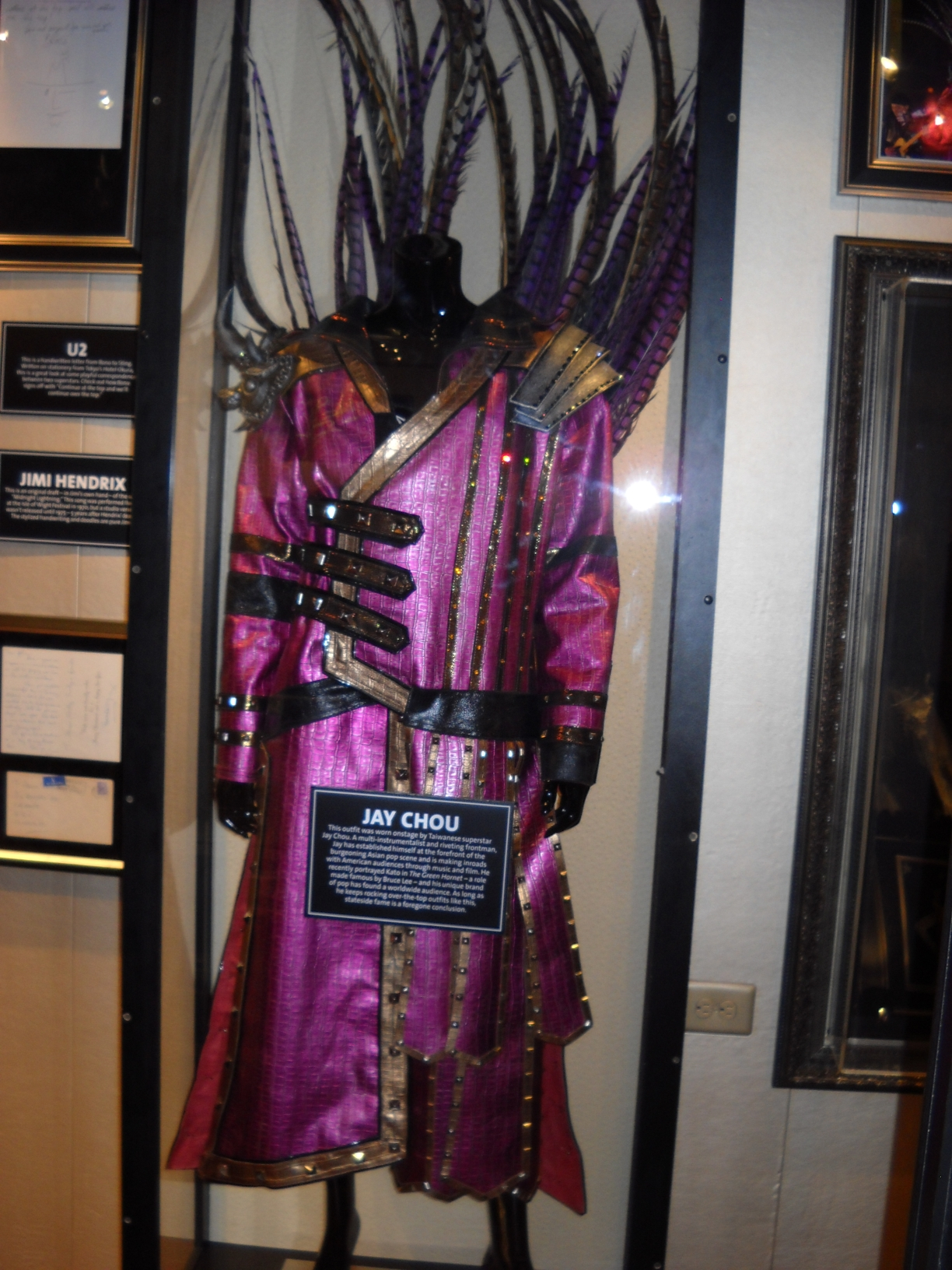
Chou's tour outfit at the Hard Rock 40th Anniversary exhibition in Seattle

The World Tour marked Chou's first large-scale world tour since the founding of his own record label, JVR Music. The tour features songs from his past seven albums, as well as tracks from his then-new album On the Run!, totaling nearly 30 songs. Chou commented, "The performance will be even more impressive than three years ago, truly extraordinary. There will be more dance routines than before, and I've learned a lot that will be incorporated into the show."

== Broadcast and recordings ==
A live album, recorded at the Banqiao Stadium concert in Taipei on November 10, 2007, was released by Sony Music Taiwan and JVR Music on January 31, 2008.

== Gallery ==
The World Tour gallery
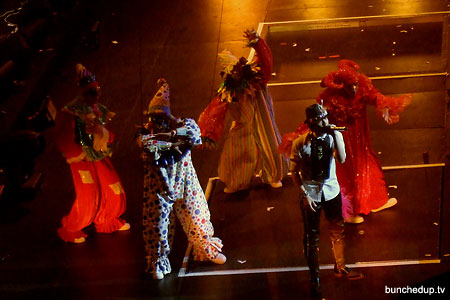

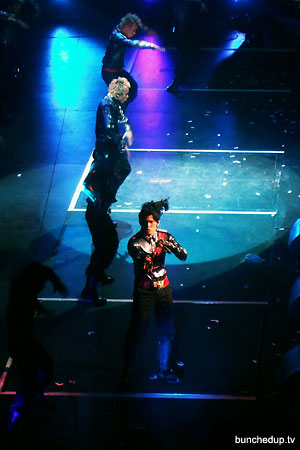

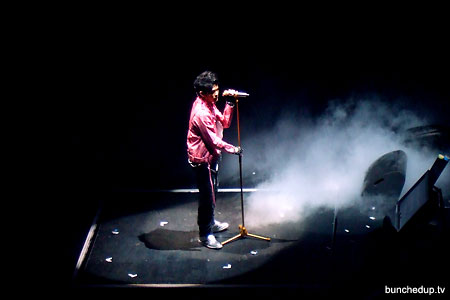

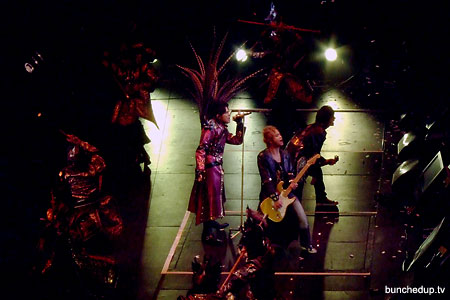

== Tour dates ==
List of concert dates
Date	City	Country	Venue	Venue
November 10, 2007	Banqiao City	Taiwan	Banqiao Stadium	30,000
November 24, 2007	Shanghai	China	Shanghai Stadium	60,000
December 5, 2007	Hong Kong	China	Hong Kong Coliseum	—
December 6, 2007	Hong Kong	China	Hong Kong Coliseum	—
December 7, 2007	Hong Kong	China	Hong Kong Coliseum	—
December 8, 2007	Hong Kong	China	Hong Kong Coliseum	—
December 9, 2007	Hong Kong	China	Hong Kong Coliseum	—
December 11, 2007	Hong Kong	China	Hong Kong Coliseum	—
December 12, 2007	Hong Kong	China	Hong Kong Coliseum	—
December 24, 2007	Los Angeles	United States	Galen Center	—
January 12, 2008	Guangzhou	China	Tianhe Stadium	—
January 18, 2008	Singapore		Singapore Indoor Stadium	—
January 19, 2008	Singapore		Singapore Indoor Stadium	—
February 16, 2008	Tokyo	Japan	Nippon Budokan	30,000
February 17, 2008	Tokyo	Japan	Nippon Budokan	30,000
February 18, 2008	Tokyo	Japan	Nippon Budokan	30,000
February 23, 2008	Kuala Lumpur	Malaysia	Stadium Merdeka	—
April 5, 2008	Macau	China	Venetian Arena	—
April 19, 2008	Nanjing	China	Nanjing Olympic Sports Centre	—
April 26, 2008	Tianjin	China	Tianjin Olympic Center Stadium	—
May 1, 2008	Beijing	China	Workers' Stadium	—
May 24, 2008 (Note: Concert was renamed "抗震救災周杰倫慈善募捐演唱會 Jay Chou Donation Drive Concert" due to the 2008 Sichuan earthquake)	Chongqing	China	Chongqing Olympic Sports Centre Stadium	—
June 21, 2008	Changsha	China	Helong Stadium	—
June 28, 2008	Guiyang	China	Guiyang New Stadium	—
July 5, 2008	Wenzhou	China	Wenzhou Sports Centre	—
September 5, 2008	Xi'an	China	Shaanxi Arena	—
October 2, 2008	Yangzhou	China	Yangzhou Sports Centre	—
October 18, 2008	Xiamen	China	Xiamen Sports Centre Stadium	—
October 25, 2008	Wuhan	China	Wuhan Sports Center Stadium	—
November 7, 2008	Chengdu	China	Chengdu Sports Centre Stadium	—
November 15, 2008	Hangzhou	China	Yellow Dragon Sports Centre Stadium	—
November 22, 2008	Nanning	China	Old Guangxi Stadium	—
November 29, 2008	Kunming	China	Kunming Tuodong Sports Centre Stadium	—
December 18, 2008	Toronto	Canada	Air Canada Centre	—
December 21, 2008	Montville	United States	Mohegan Sun Arena	—
February 14, 2009	Shenzhen	China	Shenzhen Stadium	—
April 25, 2009	Luoyang	China	Luoyang Stadium	—
May 1, 2009	Kunshan	China	Kunshan Sports Centre Stadium	—
May 16, 2009	Quanzhou	China	Straits Sports Centre Stadium	—
July 3, 2009	Sydney	Australia	Acer Arena	—
August 22, 2009	Foshan	China	Century Lotus Stadium	—
August 28, 2009	Shenyang	China	Shenyang Olympic Sports Centre Stadium	—

== Live album ==
2007 the World Tour

Live album by Jay Chou
- Released: January 31, 2008
- Recorded: November 10, 2007
- Venue: Banqiao Stadium
- Genre: Mandopop
- Length: 94:00
- Label: Sony, JVR

Jay Chou chronology
On the Run! (2007)	2007 the World Tour (2008)	Capricorn (2008)

2007 the World Tour (simplified Chinese: 2007世界巡回演唱会; traditional Chinese: 2007世界巡迴演唱會) is the third live album by Taiwanese singer Jay Chou, released on January 31, 2008, by Sony Music Taiwan and JVR Music and included a date filmed at Banqiao Stadium on November 10, 2007, from the 2007 World Tour.

=== Track listing ===
1. "Golden Armor" (黃金甲) – 3:17
2. "Incomparable" (無雙) – 5:06
3. "A Secret That Can't Be Told" (不能說的秘密) – 4:57
4. "A Step Back" (退後) – 4:24
5. "Sweet" (甜甜的) – 4:11
6. "The Longest Movie" (最長的電影) – 4:01
7. "A Dandelion's Promise" (蒲公英的約定) – 4:13
8. "White Windmill" (白色風車) – 4:38
9. "Chrysanthemum Terrace" (菊花台) – 5:02
10. "Malt Sugar" (麥芽糖) – 4:23
11. "Cowboy is Very Busy" (牛仔很忙) – 2:45
12. "Listen to Mom" (聽媽媽的話) – 3:25
13. "Herbalist Manual" (本草綱目) feat. Alan Ko – 3:30
14. "A Thousand Miles Away" (千里之外) feat. Fei Yu–ching – 4:17
15. "Nocturne" (夜曲) – 3:43
16. "Rosemary" (迷迭香) – 4:12
17. "Sunshine Homeboy" (陽光宅男) – 5:54
18. "Hair Like Snow" (發如雪) – 6:06
19. "Fearless" (霍元甲) – 3:18
20. "Nunchucks" (雙截棍) – 3:04
21. "Master Chou" (周大俠) feat. Funky Tu – 2:15
