= Incomparable Tour =

2004–2006 concert tour by Jay Chou

- Tour by Jay Chou
- Associated album: Common Jasmine Orange
- Start date: 2 October 2004
- End date: 6 February 2006
- No. of shows: 21 in Asia; 3 in North America; 24 in total

Jay Chou concert chronology
- The One Tour (2002–04); Incomparable Tour (2004–06); The World Tour (2007–08)

The Incomparable Tour (traditional Chinese: 無與倫比演唱會; simplified Chinese: 无与伦比演唱会) was the third concert tour by Taiwanese recording artist Jay Chou, held in support of his fifth studio album Common Jasmine Orange (2004). The tour visited various countries including Taiwan, China, Singapore, Malaysia, the United States and Japan from October 2004 to February 2006.

== Commercial performance ==
The concerts at the Tokyo International Forum on 5 and 6 February 2006, attracted around 10,000 people in total.

== Tour dates ==
List of concert dates
Date	City	Country	Venue
2 October 2004	Taipei	Taiwan	Taipei Municipal Stadium
24 October 2004	Wuhan	China	Xinhua Road Sports Centre Stadium
9 November 2004	Hong Kong		Hong Kong Coliseum
10 November 2004	Hong Kong		Hong Kong Coliseum
11 November 2004	Hong Kong		Hong Kong Coliseum
12 November 2004	Hong Kong		Hong Kong Coliseum
13 November 2004	Hong Kong		Hong Kong Coliseum
14 November 2004	Hong Kong		Hong Kong Coliseum
15 November 2004	Hong Kong		Hong Kong Coliseum
26 November 2004	Singapore		Singapore Indoor Stadium
27 November 2004	Singapore		Singapore Indoor Stadium
3 December 2004	Hangzhou	China	Yellow Dragon Sports Centre Stadium
18 December 2004	Los Angeles	United States	Shrine Auditorium
24 December 2004	Montville	United States	Mohegan Sun Arena
25 December 2004	Montville	United States	Mohegan Sun Arena
29 January 2005	Kuala Lumpur	Malaysia	Stadium Merdeka
1 July 2005	Shanghai	China	Shanghai Stadium
8 July 2005	Beijing	China	Workers' Stadium
17 September 2005	Suzhou	China	Suzhou Sports Center
24 September 2005	Harbin	China	HICEC Stadium
30 September 2005	Shenzhen	China	Shenzhen Stadium
17 December 2005	Guangzhou	China	Tianhe Stadium
5 February 2006	Tokyo	Japan	Tokyo International Forum
6 February 2006	Tokyo	Japan	Tokyo International Forum
Total

== Live album ==
2004 Incomparable Concert

Live album by Jay Chou
- Released: 21 January 2005
- Recorded: 2 October 2004
- Venue: Taipei Municipal Stadium
- Genre: Mandopop
- Label: Alfa; Warner

Jay Chou chronology
Common Jasmine Orange (2004)	2004 Incomparable Concert (2005)	Initial J (2005)

2004 Incomparable Concert (traditional Chinese: 2004無與倫比演唱會; simplified Chinese: 2004无与伦比演唱会) is the second live album by Taiwanese singer Jay Chou, released as of 21 January 2005 by Alfa Music and Warner Music Taiwan, and included a date filmed at Taipei Municipal Stadium on 2 October 2004 from the 2004 Incomparable Concert.

=== Track listing ===
1. "In Father's Name" (以父之名) – 5:59
2. "The Wound That Ends War" (止戰之殤) – 4:37
3. "Her Eyelashes" (她的睫毛) – 3:50
4. "Sunny Day" (晴天) – 4:58
5. "You Can Hear it" (妳聽得到) – 3:49
6. "Terrace Field" (梯田) / "Dad, I've Come Back" (爸，我回來了) – 4:36
7. "Fun Fair" (園遊會) – 4:18
8. "Tornado" (龍捲風) – 4:08
9. "General" (將軍) – 3:01
10. "Chaotic Dance" (亂舞春秋) – 4:35
11. "Starry Mood" (星晴) / "Back to the Past" (回到過去) / "The Final Battle" (最後的戰役) / "Love Me, Don't Go" (愛我別走) – 12:41
12. "My Territory" (我的地盤) – 3:59
13. "The Cliff of Love" (愛情懸崖) – 4:22
14. "Step Aside" (擱淺) – 4:21
15. "Excuse" (藉口) – 4:21
16. "Break Up" (瓦解) – 3:36
17. "Double Blade" (雙刀) / "Nunchucks" (雙截棍) / "Dragon Fist" (龍拳) – 6:59
18. "Struggle" (困獸之鬥) – 4:23
19. "Rewind" (倒帶) – 4:36
20. "Simple Love" (簡單愛) – 6:33
21. "Common Jasmine Orange" (七里香) – 5:02
22. "Grandma" (外婆) – 4:18
23. "Broken String" (斷了的弦) – 4:50
24. "East Wind Breaks" (東風破) – 5:14
25. "Orbit" (軌跡) – 6:34

Bonus MVs

1. "My Territory" (我的地盤)
2. "Common Jasmine Orange" (七里香)
3. "Excuse" (藉口)
4. "Grandma" (外婆)
5. "General" (將軍)
6. "Step Aside" (擱淺)
7. "Chaotic Dance" (亂舞春秋)
8. "Struggle" (困獸之鬥)
9. "Fun Fair" (園遊會)
10. "The Wound That Ends War" (止戰之殤)
