= Yeh Hui-Mei =

Studio album by Jay Chou
- Released: 31 July 2003
- Recorded: 2003
- Studio: Alfa Studio (Taipei)
- Genre: R&B; pop; alternative rock
- Length: 48:08
- Language: Mandarin
- Label: Alfa Music
- Producer: Jay Chou

Jay Chou chronology
The One Concert (2002)	Yeh Hui-Mei (2003)	Hidden Track (2003)

Singles from Yeh Hui-Mei
- 1. "In the Name of the Father" Released: 16 July 2003; 2. "Sunny Day" Released: 31 July 2003; 3. "Dong-Feng-Po" Released: 31 July 2003

Yeh Hui-Mei (Chinese: 葉惠美) is the fourth studio album by Taiwanese recording artist Jay Chou. It was released by Alfa Music on 31 July 2003, and was distributed throughout Asia in physical and digital formats. Chou enlisted various collaborators to assist with the album's lyrical content, including Vincent Fang, Alang Huang, Tseng Yu-ting, and Vivian Hsu, while Chou served as the album's sole composer. Named after the singer's mother, Yeh Hui-Mei utilizes genres such as pop, R&B, and alternative rock, whilst containing influences from classical music, opera, and hip-hop. The record's production and visuals utilize both retro and contemporary elements.

The album received positive reviews from music critics, who praised its production and composition. Yeh Hui-Mei saw commercial success in various countries across Asia; in Singapore, it reached number one on the Recording Industry Association Singapore (RIAS) album chart upon release. In Taiwan, it was the best-selling album of 2003 with 335,000 copies sold, becoming Chou's third consecutive best-selling annual album after The Eight Dimensions (2002) and Fantasy (2001). Yeh Hui-Mei went on to sell over three million copies throughout Asia, and was certified gold by the RIAS.

Yeh Hui-Mei produced various singles—the track "In the Name of the Father" premiered on radio stations ahead of the album's release on 16 July, while the singles "Sunny Day" and "Dong-Feng-Po" were promoted after the album's release. Several of the record's other tracks were also featured in promotional campaigns in Greater China. At the 15th Golden Melody Awards, Yeh Hui-Mei won two awards out of eight nominations: Album of the Year, while the video for "Class 3-2" won Best Music Video. The album's other accolades include Most Popular Album of the Year the 4th Global Chinese Music Awards and the Asia Album Award at the 2004 Metro Radio Mandarin Hits Music Awards.

== Background and development ==
Chou assumed creative control over all aspects of Yeh Hui-Mei, composing all of the tracks on the album and served as the executive producer and visual director. Alongside Chou and Vincent Fang, other musicians such as Alang Huang, Tseng Yu-ting and Vivian Hsu helped write the lyrical content for the record. Chou not only composed the songs and wrote the lyrics for three of them, but also served as the album's producer and stylist. In terms of the cover art, Yeh Hui-Mei added retro elements, and Chou also wore a retro suit to participate in the shooting.

Chou's musical philosophy in creating the album was to seek change. Out of his humanistic aspirations, Chou added different views and ideas to the album. The lead single "In the Name of the Father" was inspired by Chou's experience with his father. Chou's father, Chou Yiu-Chung, was an introvert and didn't talk much to Chou, so Chou wrote the song "In the Name of My Father" for him. The song "Class 3-2" was inspired by Jay's experience of playing pool with his friend Fang.

== Writing and composition ==
Yeh Hui-Mei carries a variety of styles, including vintage style, classical, opera, hip-hop and rock. The album is full of human, musical, experimental, satirical and social realism images that stimulate the flesh and blood of people.

"In the Name of the Father" is a song with a special mix of vintage music and piano, complemented by a fusion of Italian opera. The lyrics are based on "Godfather, Godfather, Father", explaining the Godfather's helplessness, the father's mercy, the selflessness of Godfather, etc., explaining that in order to reach a higher position, a person must give up some of the freedom and ideas he should have, but often behind the glory, he only gets lonely company. "Coward" utilizes a heavy metal rap rock music style, plus a rap chorus with children; the lyrics mainly use irony of drugs to express doubts and anger about those who are addicted to drugs and take drugs. "Sunny Day" is an intimate love song. "Class 3-2" is a medium-tempo R&B song that uses the sound of ping-pong balls runs throughout. Chou imitates the style of ancient tunes with the song "Dong-Feng-Po," supplemented by the integration of erhu and pipa.

"You Hear Me" is a love song between lovers, speaking on how the secrets between them are only known to each other, and the love that depends on each other makes people reluctant to leave. "Same Tone" uses the sound of the pipa to create a Western classical atmosphere, and the interlude adds Argentine tango music to run through it. "Her Eyelashes" has the message that love has no fixed rules. "Love Cliff" has Chou and Vivian Hsu working together again; Hsu's way of writing lyrics shows that love is like a cliff, the deeper you love, the deeper you fall. "Terrace Field" uses an Aboriginal chorus, Chinese folk music and classical piano in the composition; the lyrics imply that people's destruction of the environment is cruel, and that the environment has been destroyed and the happiness of the past is gone forever. "Double Blade" expresses the Chinese being bullied in Chinatown, and their rebellion against the humble and peace-loving attitude of their parents, against the environment, and against inequality.

== Release ==
On 16 July 2003, the album's title and release date for 31 July was announced. On 19 July 2003, the album became available for pre-order with a free small oil painting of the album cover. The song "Same Tone" was used in a commercial for Pepsi-Cola. On 30 July 2003, Chou held a press conference for the release of the album in Taipei, Taiwan; at the press conference, the 13-minute movie version of "Double Blade" shot by Chou in the United States was also screened. It was reported that the album's pre-orders sold more than 1 million copies, bringing Chou 30 million Taiwan dollars in royalties. On 9 August 2003, Chou held a signing event in Ximending, Taipei that was attended by over 4,000 fans.

On 20 August, the press conference for Chou's "2008--Beijing is Waiting for You" charity concert was held in Beijing; Sina Entertainment live-broadcast the press conference that allowed Chou to chat with his fans online for about half an hour. Chou attended the new album launch held at the Kowloonbay International Trade & Exhibition Centre on 27 August 2003, and met with fans. On 31 August 2003, Chou signed autographs for fans at the "Jay Chou Yeh Hui-Mei CD Autograph Session" held at Fashion Walk in Causeway Bay, Hong Kong. On the evening of 7 September 2003, Chou held a press conference at the Beijing Tianlun Dynasty Holiday Hotel for his concert "Beijing Looking Forward to You 2008" to be held at the Workers' Stadium on 12 September.

=== Title and artwork ===
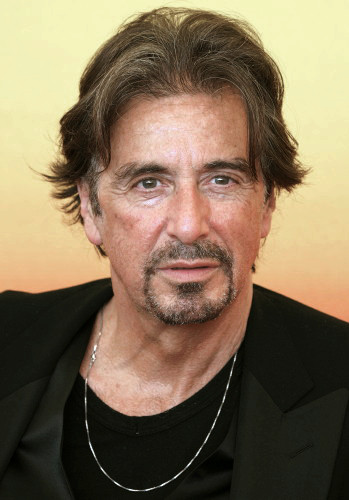
The album cover was inspired by the iconic image of Al Pacino (pictured) seated in a chair in The Godfather.

The album title uses the name of the singer's mother "Yeh Hui-Mei" because Chou thought that the title song of the album should be called "In the Name of the Father," so he used his mother's name as the album title for the sake of "balance." The album cover design of Yeh Hui-Mei features Chou donning a retro-style suit whilst sitting on a vintage chair and pays homage to the classic movie The Godfather.

=== Singles and music videos ===
On 16 July 2003, "In the Name of the Father" was premiered simultaneously on more than 50 radio stations across Asia, with an estimated 800 million people listening to it at the same time. Therefore, 16 July every year is designated as "Jay Chou Day." In order to match the song and image, Chou went to Rome to shoot the music video for "In the Name of the Father," which was directed by Kuang Sheng. The video tells the story of a child who grew up as a killer in a gangster family; one day, he suddenly discovered that the godfather who adopted him turned out to be the one who killed his biological father.

The music video for "Sunny Day" was filmed in Tamsui, New Taipei City, directed by Shockley Huang and features actress Doris Lai. After seeing Lai's commercial, Chou selected her to play the heroine in the music video. When filming the video, Lai had just graduated from high school. In the video for "Sunny Day," Chou broke the habit of never kissing the heroine of the video, and made a breakthrough performance with 19-year-old Lai. In two kissing scenes, the man took the initiative to kiss the woman, and the two locked lips for 10 seconds. This was also Chou's first kiss on screen. The video for "Class 3-2," which was directed by Kuang Sheng, revolves around a school ping pong match. Kuang Sheng directed the video for "Dong-Feng-Po," which revolves around Chou singing in a house, shifting between past (1920s China) and the present. The music video for "You Hear Me" was directed by Ko-tai Chou and filmed in Prague. The heroine of the music video for "You Hear Me" is Pei Weiying, who plays a girl who makes Chou's heart beat in the video.

The music video for "Same Tone" was directed by David Tsui and shows Chou throwing a paper ball into a wastebasket and Yao Ming throwing a basketball into the basket. Chou said that although Yao Ming was not found to shoot this video in person, his images were used in post-production. The music video for "Her Eyelashes" was directed by Sun Dongming and was shot in Paris, with scenes of Chou being playful with a girl. The music video for "Love Cliff" was directed by Kuang Sheng and revolves around Chou and his piano in solitary. Kuang Sheng also directed the music video for "Terrace Field," which contains scenes where Chou raps in the streets where it was once an agricultural field. The video for "Double Blade" was directed by Alexi Tan and was filmed in Los Angeles. In order to cooperate with the promotion of Yeh Hui-Mei, Chou secretly practiced martial arts and acted as an actor in "Double Blade" filmed by a Hollywood film production team. The short film was about 15 minutes long and was later edited into a six minute video.

On 12 January 2004, the tracks "Sunny Day," "Her Eyelashes" and "Dong-Feng-Po" were listed at number 2, number 15 and number 41 respectively on the 2003 Hit FM Top 100 Singles of the Year chart.

== Critical reception ==
Professional ratings
Review scores
Source	Rating
Sputnikmusic	4/5 stars

The album was well-received by music critics. In a positive Sputnikmusic review of Yeh Hui Mei, it classifies the album as a standout, genre‑blending Mandopop album, praising Chou’s creativity and musical range while noting the record can feel stylistically scattered. The reviewer argues Chou far surpasses typical Mandopop conventions, and the album’s diversity is both its greatest strength and its main weakness. Music critic Wu Jianheng gave Yeh Hui-Mei a very high evaluation, believing that the album began to convey Chou's concern for society, his thoughts were more mature, and the quality was good. In 2020, to celebrate Chou's 20th anniversary in the industry, NetEase conducted a ranking of Chou's best albums; Yeh Hui-Mei made it onto the runner-up spot on the list.

Apple Music Taiwan stated that Yeh Hui-Mei was full of hard work and sincerity. Apple Music China stated: "Jay Chou travels through time and space, skillfully blending retro and modern, creating new elements that are not found in current pop music." Tencent Music's Wave Review Panel ranked Yeh Hui-Mei 4th place in their list of the "200 Best Chinese Albums of 2001–2020", recognizing the record as a perfect balance in various aspects such as musical level, personal expression, commercial success, and style breakthrough. "In the Name of the Father" is a religious song and has been praised as one of Chou's best works.

== Accolades ==
The album was nominated for eight Golden Melody Awards and won two awards, including Album of the Year and Best Music Video for "Class 3-2". The album also won an IFPI Hong Kong Top Sales Music Award for Best Selling Mandarin Album of the Year. It also won the Metro Mandarin Power Asia Album Award at the 2004 Metro Radio Mandarin Hits Music Awards Presentation, and the Most Popular Album of the Year Award at the 4th Global Chinese Music Awards. On 28 March 2004, Eric Hung won the Best Arrangement Award at the 4th Top Chinese Music Awards for the song "In the Name of the Father." Since 2004, the song "Sunny Day" has won many music awards including the "Best Song Award in Hong Kong and Taiwan" in the 10th China Music Awards, and made it onto the leaderboard of the "Top 20 Songs of the Year" in the 4th Global Chinese Music Awards. In 2004, "Class 3-2" made it onto the leaderboard of the "Top Ten Hits" at the 4th Top Chinese Music Awards.

In 2004, "Dong-Feng-Po" made it onto the leaderboard of the Top Ten Singles Award at the 4th Chinese Pop Media Awards, the Most Popular Song Award in Hong Kong and Taiwan at the 11th China Pop Chart, the Song of the Year in Taiwan and Hong Kong at the Music Radio China Top Chart Awards, and the Best MV Work Award in Hong Kong, Taiwan and Overseas Chinese at the 7th China Central Television (CCTV) Music Television Competition, and Vincent Fang was awarded the Best Lyricist Award in Hong Kong, Taiwan and Overseas Chinese at the 4th Top Chinese Music Awards for the song. "You Can Hear" won the Mandarin Power Song Award at the Metro Radio Mandarin Hits Music Awards Presentation.

== Live performances ==
Chou was one of the performing artists at the closing concert of the Sun Project that was held in Hong Kong on 29 August, that also featured acts such as Gigi Leung, Twins, Eason Chan, Ronald Cheng, Miriam Yeung, Joey Yung, Boy'z, Alex Ng and Edmond Leung. On 12 September 2003, Chou held a two hour concert at the Workers' Stadium in front of tens of thousands of fans. On 15 November 2003, Chou performed at the "2003 Asian Superstar Anti-Piracy Passion Concert" that was held at the 80,000-seat Stadium in Shanghai and featured other prolific singers like Harlem Yu, Faye Wong, Leehom Wang, Ken Chu, Vanness Wu, Jolin Tsai, A-do, Shin Seung Hun, Mika Nakashima, Comic Boyz and Chemical Boys. On the evening of 21 November 2003, the "Dynamic Zone-2003 Nanjing Concert" was held at Wutaishan Stadium in Nanjing that featured Chou, Where Chou, Chris Yu, Landy Wen, Lam Chi-liang and other singers. On 12 December 2003, Chou held a solo concert in Shanghai at the Shanghai Stadium. The "Dynamic Zone Jay Chou Guangzhou Concert" was held at Tianhe Stadium on the evening of 20 December 2003, in front of 37,000 spectators.

== Track listing ==
All music is composed by Jay Chou.

Yeh Hui-Mei track listing
No.	Title	Lyrics	Arrangement	Length
1.	"In the Name of the Father" (以父之名; Yǐ fù zhī míng)	Alang Huang	Eric Hung	5:42
2.	"Coward" (懦夫; Nuòfū)	Jay Chou	Jay Chou	3:38
3.	"Sunny Day" (晴天; Qíngtiān)	Jay Chou	Jay Chou	4:29
4.	"Class 3-2" (三年二班; Sān nián èr bān)	Vincent Fang	Eric Hung	4:40
5.	"Dong-Feng-Po" (東風破; Dōng fēng pò)	Vincent Fang	Michael Lin	5:15
6.	"You Hear Me" (妳聽得到; Nǐ tīng dédào)	Tseng Yu-ting	Michael Lin	3:50
7.	"Same Tone" (同一種調調; Tóng yīzhǒng diàodiao)	Vincent Fang	Baby Chung	3:51
8.	"Her Eyelashes" (她的睫毛; Tā de jiémáo)	Vincent Fang	Jay Chou	3:52
9.	"Cliff" (愛情懸崖; Àiqíng xuányá)	Vivian Hsu	Baby Chung	4:22
10.	"Terrace Field" (梯田; Tītián)	Jay Chou	Jay Chou	3:33
11.	"Double Blade" (雙刀; Shuāng dāo)	Vincent Fang	Baby Chung	4:51
Total length:				48:08

== Charts ==
=== Weekly charts ===
Chart (2003)	Peak position
Malaysian Albums (RIM)	4
Singaporean Albums (RIAS)	1

=== Year-end charts ===
Chart (2003)	Position
Taiwanese Albums (Note: Best-selling albums of the year in Taiwan as reported by media outlets)	1

== Sales ==
Region	Certification	Certified units/sales
Singapore (RIAS)	Gold	5,000^{*}
Taiwan	—	350,000
Summaries
Asia	—	3,000,000
^{*} Sales figures based on certification alone.
