= Qing handicrafts =

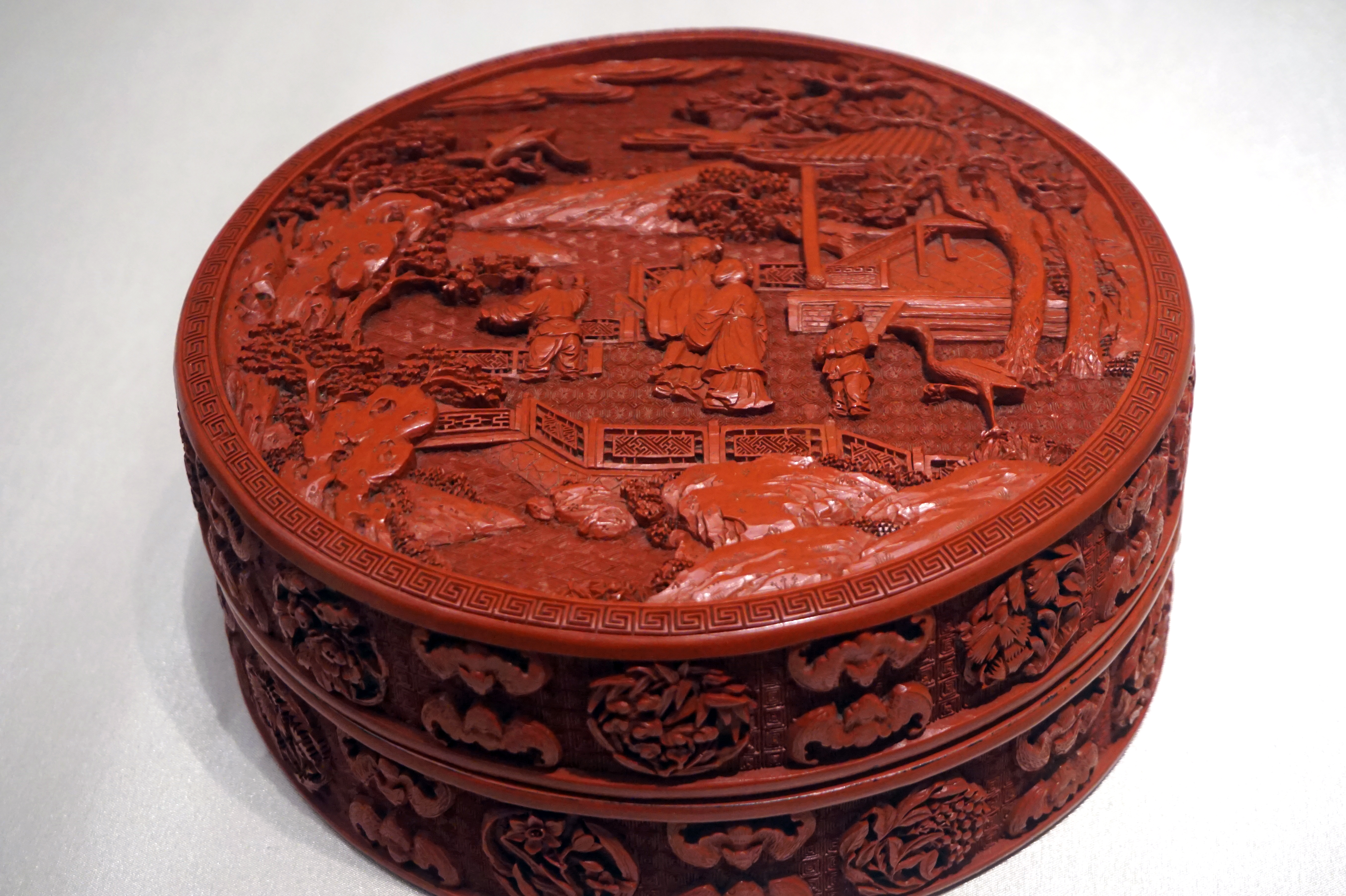
A red box carved with a crane motif. Qing dynasty (1644–1911), Qianlong period (1736–95).

Handicrafts (手工业 shougongye) produced during the Qing dynasty (1644–1911) were objects designed and hand-made by craftsmen. They were heavily ornate, incorporating Tibetan, Middle Eastern, Indian, and European techniques. The design or decorative aspect of the craft was as important as the crafting technique itself and Qing artisans were particular about the materials they used, such as jade (yu), stones, and wood. In their designs artisans drew heavily from a number of motifs, both mythical and natural. Certain areas in China became well known for specific types of handicrafts; for example, Jingdezhen was known as the capital of porcelain. During the Qing era, Imperial Workshops built in Beijing brought together artisans and raw materials that were once only obtainable in disparate regions. This allowed for the combining of technologies and materials to produce new types of handicrafts. The tributary system also brought new sources for materials and artisans that were not from the production centers.

To the state, crafts were an important part of the Qing dynasty's economy and were regulated by the state. With the stronger presence of Western powers in the nineteenth century, handicrafts, especially porcelain, took on different characteristics depending on whether it was for domestic consumption and international export. Unlike the Ming, the proliferation of handicrafts in the Qing dynasty not only attests to the dynasty's "materialistic mandate" and but also the value of craftsmanship. Studies of the technological advancement of handicrafts in the Qing dynasty show the early stages of Chinese industrialization.

== Materials ==
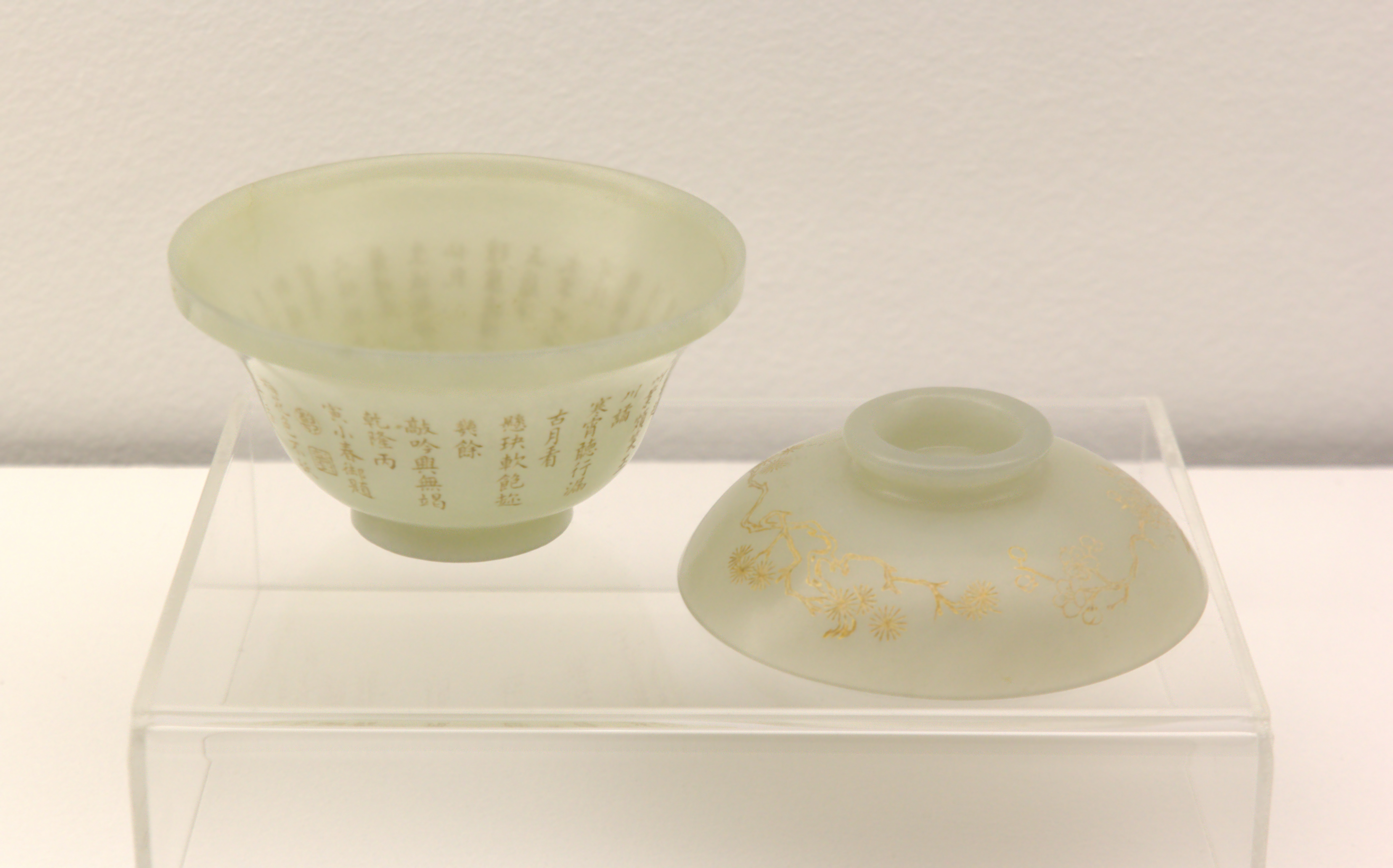
Bowl made out of jade with gold inlay. Qing dynasty (1644–1911), Qianlong period (1736–95).

A list of common materials that were used by artisans.

- Jade (yu)
- Hardstone
- Bamboo
- Silk
- Clay
- Lacquer
- Hardwood
- Ivory
- Marble
- Glass

== Types of handicrafts ==
Handicrafts in the Qing era are marked by their ornamentation, use of colors, and innovative production technologies. These aspects not only enhanced the quality of objects produced, but added to their value as luxury products as it was easier for artisans to incorporate more complex techniques in their work. The advancement of handicraft technology and the contact between specialized artisans at imperial workshops resulted in the possibility of combining multiple raw materials in a singular object, such as the hardwood being inlaid with enamelled porcelain. With the increase of trade networks and the tributary system, the centers of certain handicraft traditions shifted as raw materials such as hardwoods and ivory from Southeast Asia, marble from Yunnan, and jade from Burma were able to be imported from different locations. For example, Suzhou became the center of the production of carved lacquer, jade carving, metalwork, silks, and furniture by the 18th century, replacing than the various center located in the towns of western Zhejiang. Taste for handicrafts also differed between the court and the literati. For example, the imperial household preferred blue-and-white porcelain in the 18th century while the literati preferred archaistic bronzes or ceramic imitations of bronzes. Handicrafts from the imperial manufactory set the standard, but the commercial market had a larger output in comparison.

=== Porcelain ===
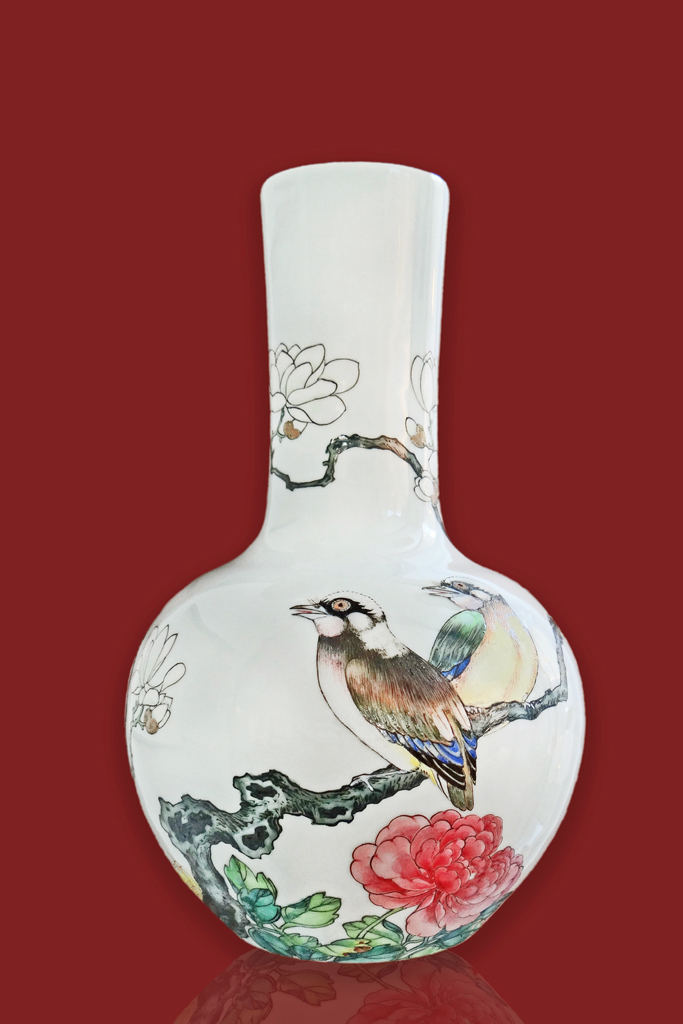
Porcelain vase from Jingdezhen, Jiangxi. Qing dynasty.

Further information: Chinese ceramics

Porcelain changed significantly throughout the Qing era itself, moving from transitional porcelain to monochrome porcelain, porcelain with painted scenes, and export porcelain. Jingdezhen was the capital of Chinese porcelain since the Ming dynasty but other sites of porcelain production included Dehua, known for their production of porcelain dolls in both the Ming and Qing eras. Other forms of pottery like Yixing clayware were also popular in the Qing era. Wares in the mid-18th century were named after superintendents due to their achievements in the improvement of quality of porcelain: 'Lang ware' was named after Lang Tingji, 'Nian ware' after Nian Xiyao, and 'Tang ware' after Tang Ying.

Porcelain in the Qing dynasty features opaque overglaze colors, especially highlighted through the style of monochrome porcelain. Monochrome porcelain also highlights the importance of smoothness (run) found in Qing era decoration and handicrafts. Glazes, in fact, only became a major party of decorative art during the Qing dynasty after the Kangxi, Yongzhen, and Qianlong emperors came into contact with Jesuit missionary glassmakers. Qing (青) (not to be confused with the character for the Qing dynasty, 清), meaning green, blue-green, or blue, was one type of glaze that artisans strove to perfect through techniques such as firing lavender glaze and apple-green enamel-type glaze at high temperatures to produce a multitude of tints and hues. Glazes also allowed for patterning techniques such as the "cracked-ice" style that was first featured on porcelain from the Ming dynasty (1368–1644). Techniques for ceramic production advanced as emperors dug up earlier productions of ceramics from the palace collection to serve as models. Moreover, contact with imported enamels from Europe encouraged the pursuit of an even more diverse palette of colors, including sepia enamel (grisaille).

=== Inkstone ===
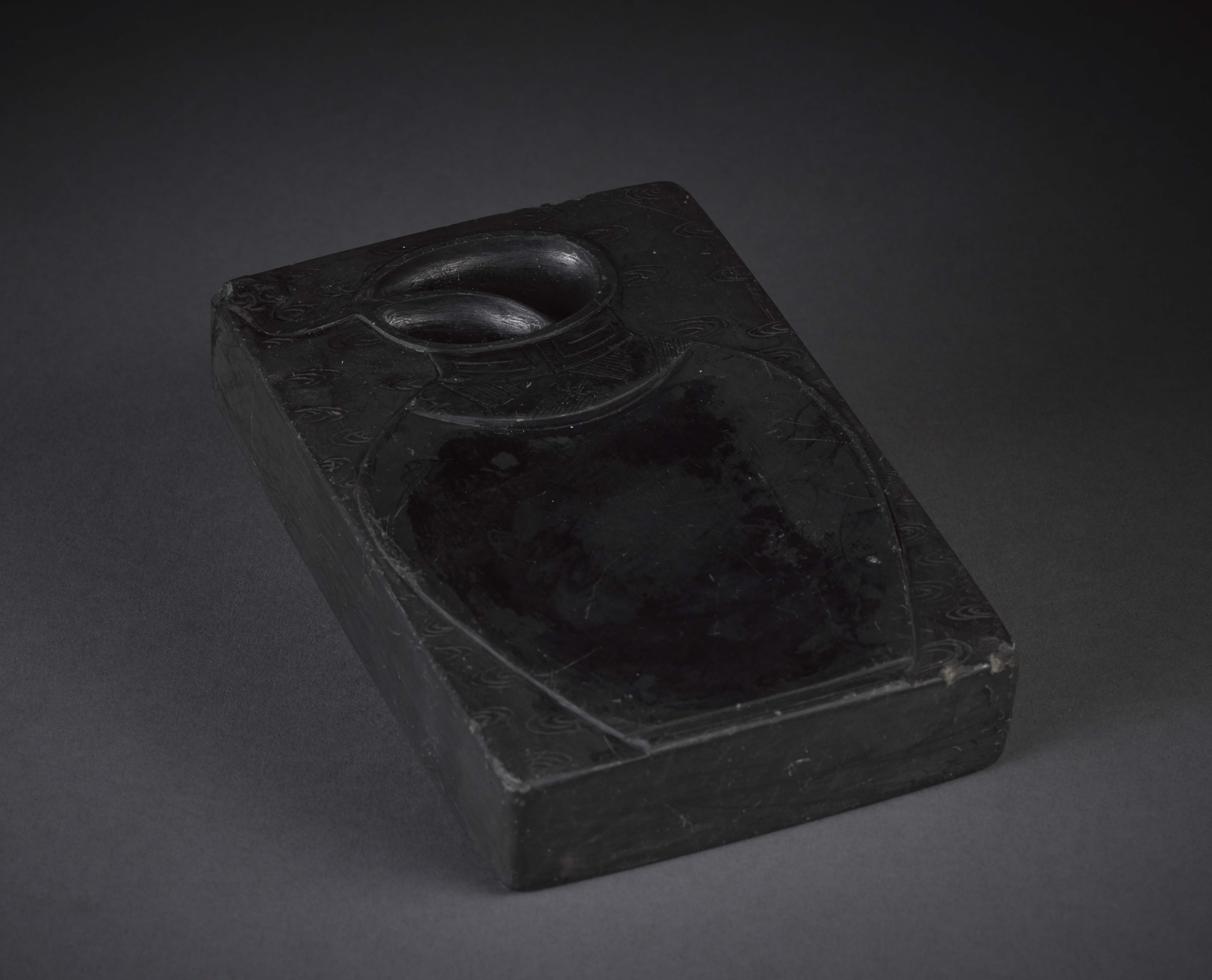
Inkstone with jar pattern, 1800–1894.

Inkstone (also called ink-slab, ink palette, or even Mr. Clay Water) were essential writing instruments in early modern East Asia. In China, inkstones were used in the culture of wen (writing, literature, civility), as a collectible object and desired gift, and as a marker of status. They were made out of clay, lacquered wood, old bricks, fallen times, glass, or semi-precious stones but were most often made from specifically harvested stones found in quarries. During the Qing era, the Kangxi emperor insisted that inkstones were to be made out of a new material, Songhua stone, in hopes of grafting a Manchu identity on a Chinese instrument. Songhua stones, being slender, flat, and thin, often patterned with bright green or purple veins or layers, could be easily shaped and carved with innovative technology that allowed for a combination of materials and techniques. However, inkstones made from Duan and She stones remained the favorites of Chinese scholars and literati.

Gu Erniang (fl. 1700–1722) was the most famous female stone-carver and one of the most accomplished among all stone-makers in the Qing era from Suzhou province. Accounts from her patrons in the Inkstone Chronicle compiled by Lin Fuyin (ca. 1690–1572) reveal the importance of both artisans and literati in the life of inkstones and vice versa. The mark of Gu also attests to her identity as a "super-brand" and the popularization of inkstones as collectible items, as it was during this era when marking handicrafts with signs of authorship became a common practice.

=== Furniture and wood carving ===
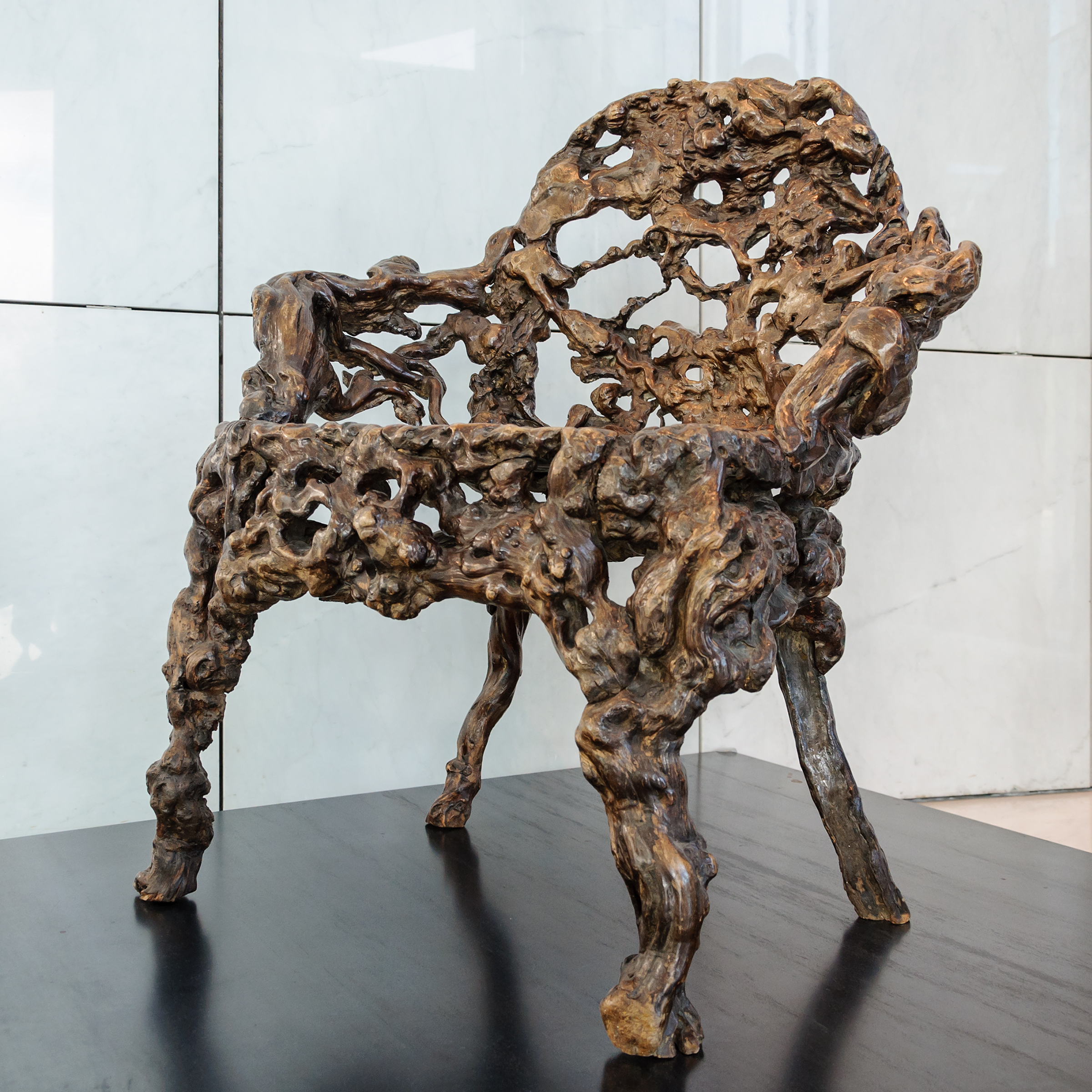
Armchair made in the root-wood style. Qing dynasty (1644–1911), Qianlong period (1736–95).

Many Jiangnan cities became known for furniture and carved objects during the Qing era. Highly ornate and decorative furniture made from the best wood could only be found in the dwellings of the literati and court elite. In the 16th century, hardwood furniture from Jiangnan was on the rise. In contrast to lacquered soft-wood furniture, exposed wood became the norm and a luxury surface. Main types of hardwood include zitian (紫檀, rosewood or red sandalwood), hualimu (花梨木 rosewood), jichimu (鸡翅木 lit. chicken wing wood), tielimu (铁力木 ironwood), wumu (乌木 ebony), and hongmu (红木 mahogany) who all had their own distinctive color and grain. Softwoods like southern elm and namu burl were also popular, alongside spotted bamboo.

Furniture and wood carving in the Qing era owes much of taste to styles from previous dynasties. Root-wood is one popular style of furniture and incense stand that has proliferated since the Tang dynasty (618–907). It is made by separate pieces of wood being joined by pegs in order to emulate the form of a tree's single root. Furthermore, Ming literati taste continued to influence furniture styles in Shanxi such that even 19th century furniture retained principles of Ming dynasty cabinetry.

=== Textiles ===
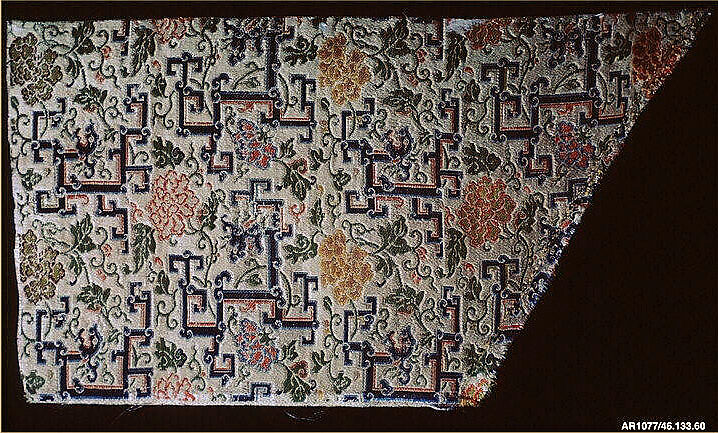
Textile with Peonies and Lattice, 18th century

In the early Qing era, there were about 800 textile looms in Suzhou, but by the reign of the Qianlong emperor and the Jiaqing emperor, there were as many as 30,000 looms in Nanjing, 10,000 in Suzhou, and 3,000 in Hanzhou. Southern China was known for its innovation of dress and fashion due to the strong silk industry in Nanjing, Suzhou, and Hangzhou. Textiles were used to accent plain furniture with bright colors, but they were also used as tributary items due to the high value of silk. Textile artisans and embroiderers used the technique trompe l'œil to create the illusion of a painting mounted on a scroll but the technique also became adapted in large-scale building projects.

Kesi (cut silk) silk tapestry is one type of textile that was first used in the Tang dynasty, but continued to proliferate until the end of the Qing. The technique of cutting silk can also be used to replicate famous paintings and paintings of literati but mostly featured symmetrically composed designs. Kesi was mostly used for table and chair coverings during formal occasions but their patterning also became imbued in other forms of surfaces, such as lacquer, jade, and bamboo carving. Kesi silk tapestry were among the many art forms catalogued during the Qianlong emperor's reign (producing the Bidian Zhulin and the Shiqu Baoji, published in 1744–1745, 1793, and 1816), alongside painting and calligraphy.

== Motifs ==
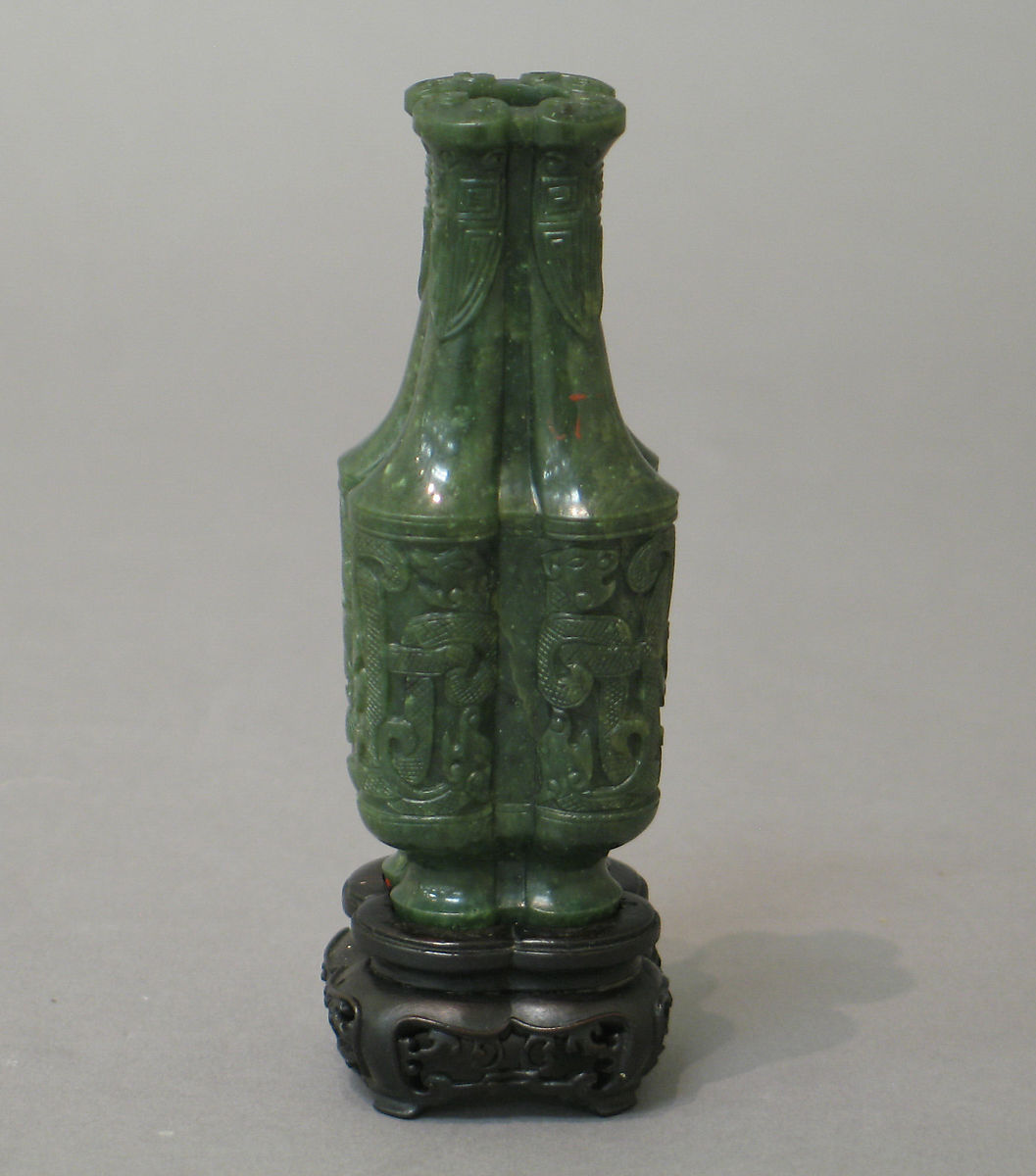
Vase with archaic motifs from the Zhou dynasty (1046–256 B.C.). Qing dynasty (1644–1911), Qianlong period (1736–95)

Handicrafts during the Qing era were more elaborate in terms of its decoration and shapes, especially prominent in crafts produced for the imperial family or ceremonial purposes. Handicrafts also became the surfaces where stories were told or where literati artists displayed their technique. They also become important objects for use, display, and collection. There were crafts that presented more than one of these motifs outlined below but not all surfaces were inlaid with motifs either.

- Mythical motifs: dragons (long) were a popular symbol used in handicrafts and Qing art in general. Under Kangxi rule, its identity as a shape-shifting creature signifies the inheritance of the Chinese imperial tradition that was significant during an era where the dynasty's identity as "foreign" rule had to be legitimated. Hanjun bannerman Liu Yuan (ca. 1641-before 1691) is one artisan who was well known for his use of dragons. Other mythical motifs include qilin, flying horses, and magic fish.
- Religious motifs: lotus imagery was often used in reference to The Lotus Sutra, a central text of Mahayanist Buddhism. Daoist and Confucian symbols were also found among surfaces and sometimes found together. Ceremonies also required the use of handicrafts and homes were often turned into religious spaces during festivals, marriages, deaths, and ancestor worship. During this time, Buddhist statues continued to be produced, especially when the Qing state made alliances with Tibet and Mongolia.
- Natural motifs: natural motifs demonstrate the way man-made environment was connected to the natural environment and thus nature was a heavy point of reference in both Ming and Qing handicrafts. As countrysides rapidly urbanized, nature became increasingly important, even if it was represented artificially through handicrafts. In contrast to religious motifs, secular motifs could evoke prosperity, happiness, fertility and more. For example, fish (yu) were used to symbolize abundance and plenty. Items like pine, bamboo, and prunus were depicted together as the "three friends of the coldest part of the year."
- Archaic motifs: the style of archaic bronzes produced during the Tang dynasty was a popular form of vessel in the Qing period, so much so that replicas and forgeries were made. Patterns and vessel shapes from even earlier Chinese history were also valued. Patination was used as a technique to simulate the aged look of bronzes and archaic vessels. Archaic objects projected a sense of antiquity and political authority in connecting art forms to Chinese art traditions of the past. Jesuit priest Matteo Ricci wrote that to the Chinese archaic bronze collector, "they desire them with a certain particular corrosion."
- Women as motifs: the beautiful young woman (美人 meiren) was a common motif in decorative handicrafts for she symbolized the pleasure of viewing the object and real-life women as well. Women in white make-up was also a comparison for the measure of whiteness on the surfaces of vases and handicrafts and often depicted with white porcelain bowls or white jade vases. The blackness of women's hair was evoked in the comparison to lacquer.

== Imperial workshops ==
Imperial workshops, or Palace Workshops, (造辦處 zaobanchu) were first established during the Kangxi emperor's reign in 1680 around the Forbidden City and Yuanmingyuan palace. Imperial workshops was one place where technocratic culture was formed. They were established for the maintenance and creation of objects for the imperial family or ceremonial functions of the court but they also thrived as an area of artistic production as artisans and craftsmen from all over China, Asia, and even overseas (Jesuits from Europe) came into contact with each other. In addition, official workshops were established in certain provinces and the court continued to send out orders to those workshops, making certain areas well known for their production of a single type of handicraft. The first forty years of the imperial workshop system is unknown due to a lack of archives, but some aspects can be constructed from material evidence of the objects that were produced. Under the reign of the Yongzheng emperor (1723–1735), imperial workshops became better rationalized and organized as different offices were established to maximize operational capacity.

Imperial workshops, being in close proximity to the imperial seat, boasted an "imperial" style that was meant to differentiate between objects produced in the imperial quarters and those outside the court. In fact, all objects also had to be made and released with the emperor's approval. As a result, handicrafts produced during different reigns varied in style because the emperors had their own "imperial style". For example, the Yongzheng emperor favored West Hill stones for inkstones and preferred details like a contrast of colors between the inkstone's box and stone.

== Handicraft regulations ==
Zeli (則例) or "regulations and precedents" were legal documents produced by the Qing court for administrative units. Jiangzuo zeli (匠作則例) or "handicraft regulations" were sets of texts and lists produced by officials that set the precedent for the production of buildings and handicrafts as determined by the imperial standard. They include administrative references, account books, and cost estimates. Before building products and luxury production, cost estimates, a list of materials and workloads, and technical data had to be submitted to the Ministry of Public Works and these were record in the jiangzuo zeli.

The handicraft regulations are not only a valuable source to the technical history of handicrafts in Qing China but demonstrate the regulation of economy and wages. In contemporary China, architects and historians use these documents to analyze and rebuild historical buildings for the preservation of Chinese cultural heritage.

== See also ==
- Porcelain trade in Qing China
- Qing art
- Chinese textiles
