= Sheng-Ching Chang =

Taiwanese art historian and professor (born 1963)

張省卿
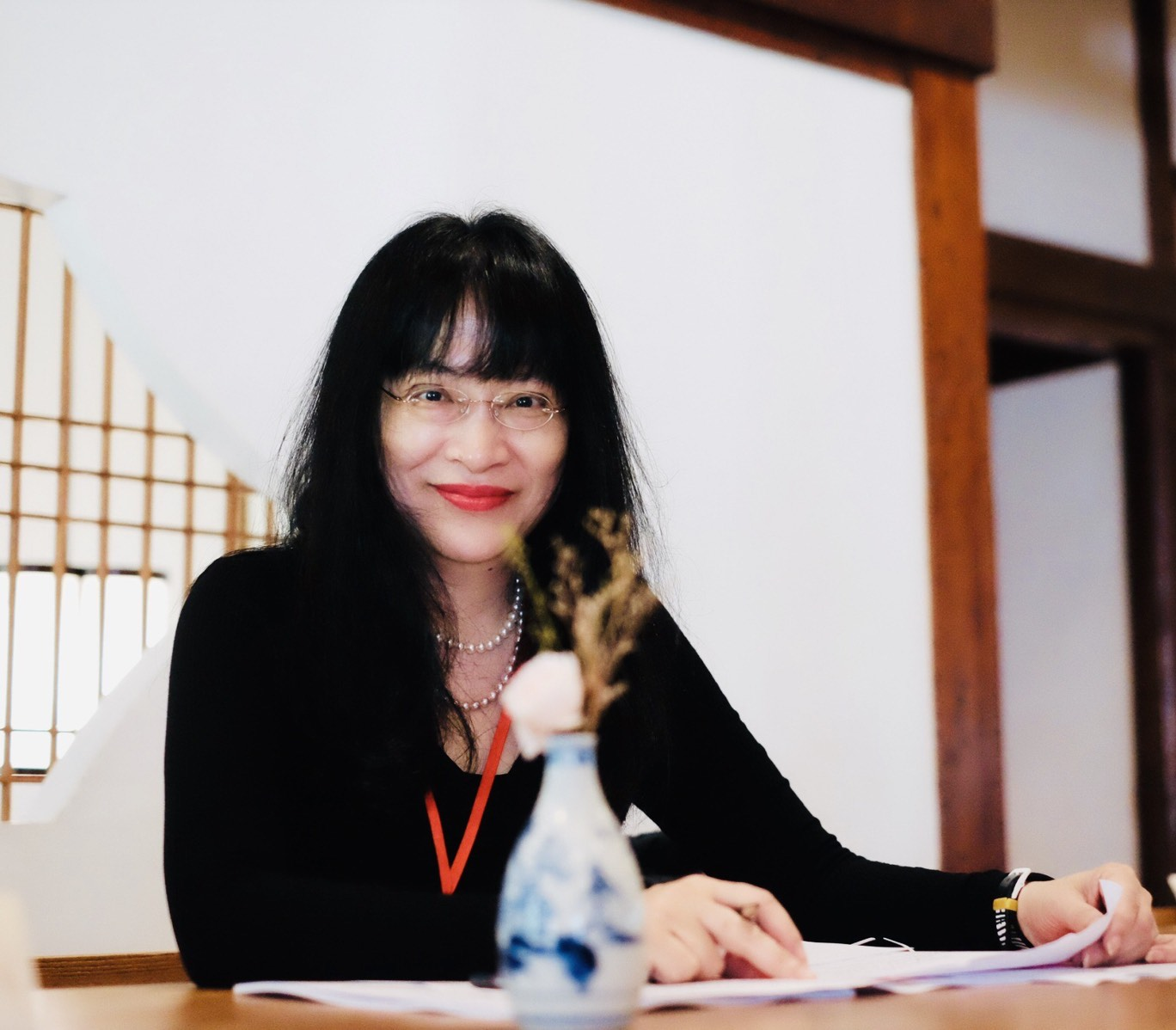
- Prof. Dr. Sheng-Ching Chang at Beitou Museum of Art, Taipei, March 26, 2021
- Born: 1963 (age 62–63); Tainan, Taiwan
- Occupation: Professor

Academic background
- Education: Fu Jen Catholic University (BA); University of Hamburg (MA); Humboldt University of Berlin (PhD)

Academic work
- Institutions: Fu Jen Catholic University; Taipei National University of Arts; National Taiwan University of Arts

Sheng-Ching Chang (張省卿; born 1963 in Tainan, Taiwan) is a Taiwanese art historian. She serves as the director of the Graduate Institute of Museum Studies at Fu Jen Catholic University and a professor at the Department of History of Fu Jen Catholic University in Taipei.

== Life ==
She attended Fu Jen Catholic University in Taipei, Taiwan, receiving a B.A. with a major in history and a minor in international trade. From 1986 to 1995, she studied at the University of Hamburg in Germany, obtaining a master's degree in art history and history with her thesis Das Porträt von Johann Adam Schall von Bell in Athanasius Kirchers 'China illustrata' (The Portrait of Johann Adam Schall von Bell in Athanasius Kircher's 'China illustrata' ). From 1996 until 2002, she studied at the Department of Art History of the Humboldt University of Berlin, Germany, where she received her PhD with her thesis The Image of China in Nature and Landscape of Athanasius Kircher's 'China illustrata'.

From 1988 to 1997, Chang worked as a journalist for the Taiwanese newspapers Independent Morning Post, Independent Evening Post and Independent Weekly Post. She wrote for magazines such as Artist, ARTIMA and Art of Collection in Taipei and Nineties in Hong Kong. She was also a photographic reporter for the Taiwanese edition of National Geographic Magazine and an editor for the German magazines Diskus and Pen, which discuss topics including the development of art and culture in Europe and Asia.

Chang worked as an assistant professor of history and art history at Fu Jen Catholic University, Taipei National University of Arts and National Taiwan University of Arts in Taipei from 2002 until 2006. She was later appointed full associate professor (2009) and full professor (2016) at the History Department and Graduate Institute of Fu Jen University. In 2018, she was an adjunct professor at the Graduate Institute of Art History at National Taiwan Normal University in Taipei, Taiwan. Since 2020, she has served as the director of the Graduate Institute of Museum Studies at Fu Jen. Her research focus has been on European art history in the global context, the history of artistic and cultural exchange between the East and the West, the methodology of art history, and the history of colonial urban development. From 2023 to 2024, she serves as a visiting scholar at the Humboldt University of Berlin and participates in the university's Cluster of Excellence "Matters of Activity. Image Space Material" project. In 2024, she also holds a professorship at the China Center for Science and Technology at Technische Universität Berlin.

Since 2005, along with her lecturing responsibilities, Chang has organized yearly conferences in collaboration with her colleagues at Fu Jen Catholic University on the 'History of Cultural Exchange', as well as a series of yearly lectures (2008–) and workshops (2011–) examining 'World History'. She has organized panels at institutions across Asia and Europe, including the Institute of History at the University of Oxford, LMU Munich, the Institute of Oriental Studies of Jagiellonian University in Kraków, the Taipei National Palace Museum and the China Central Academy of Fine Arts in Beijing. In 2019, Chang was at the Jagiellonian University as a special professor, where she lectured on "Chinese Art History and Its Globalization" (on the following six subjects: "Chinese Cities: Beijing," "Chinese Gardens: Suzhou Gardens," "Chinese Architecture: Nanjing Pagoda," "Chinese Painting: Landscape Painting," "Chinese Sculpture: Buddha statues" and "Chinese Handicraft: Blue and White Porcelain") Further, she edited the Fu Jen Historical Journal, reviewed the Journal of Fine Arts at Taipei National University of the Arts and sat on scholarships and history research association boards. She served as a faculty promotion dissertation review committee member at the College of Liberal Arts, National Taiwan University and the College of Liberal Arts, National Taiwan Normal University.

== Scholarships and prizes ==
- 1990 – 1995 Scholarship from the German Friedrich - Naumann Foundation for a Master's degree
- 1996 – 1999 Scholarship from the German Heinrich - Böll Foundation for a PhD
- 2000 – 2001 Scholarship from the Taipei Chiang Ching-Kuo Foundation for PhD students in the Europe International Scholarly Exchange Program
- 2003 Financial support from the German Research Foundation (Deutsche Forschungsgemeinschaft) for the publication of a monograph
- 2003: Grant from the National Science Council of Taiwan
- 2007 – 2008: Grant from the National Science Council of Taiwan: The influence of German style urban planning on the central area of administrative buildings in the city of Taipei by the Japanese colonial administration
- 2006 – 2009, 2013: Five-time recipient of the Annual Award from Fu Jen Catholic University for research achievements
- 2010 – 2011: Grant from the National Science Council of Taiwan: Reconstruction of Chinese style gardens in Germany from 17th and 18th Century
- 2011 – 2012: Grant from the National Science Council of Taiwan: The Reconstruction of Chinese Style Gardens in Eastern Germany in the latter half of the 18th century using the example of the Garden of Wörlitz (1700-1813)
- 2016 – 2018: Grant from the National Science Council of Taiwan: The Construction of Chinoiserie Gardens in 18 th Century Sanssouci in Potsdam, Prussia
- 2017: Received the Academic Research Award of Fu Jen Catholic University for a monograph
- 2018 – 2021: Grant from the National Science Council of Taiwan: The beautiful Utopia in Images of Mechanics from 17th and 18th century Europe and Exchange with China
- 2019 – 2021: Grant from the National Science Council of Taiwan: Exchange of Chinese and Western scientific images in the 17th and 18th centuries (II) with the example of the Yijing binary diagrams
- 2020 – 2021: Grant from the National Science Council of Taiwan: Scientific and Artistic exchange between China and the West in the 17th and 18th centuries based on binary diagrams from Yijing (III)

== Publications ==
=== Monographies ===
- Natur und Landschaft － der Einfluss von Athanasius Kirchers China illustrata auf die europäische Kunst, Berlin (Dietrich Reimer Verlag GmbH), 2003.
- The Influence of German Style Urban Planning on the Central Area of Administrative Buildings in the City of Taipei by the Japanese Colonial Administration, Taipei (Fu Jen Catholic University Press), 2008.
- The East enlightening the West – Chinese elements in the 18th century landscape gardens of Wörlitz in Germany, Taipei (Fu Jen Catholic University Press), 2015.
- A New Perspective: History of Eastern and Western Art Exchange under Globalization, Taipei (China Times Publishing Co.), 2022.
- 1723, 11 Windows of World History: Contact, Convergence and Creation, See the Pattern and Changes of the Modern World from the Characters in Global History, pp. 246–301, Taipei,(Linkingbooks), December 2023.

=== Chapters of monographies ===
- Studentenprotest und Repression in China, April bis Juli 1989, in Ruth Cremerius, Doris Fischer and Peter Schier, eds. Hamburg (Institut für Asienkunde, Mitteilungen des Instituts für Asienkunde Hamburg), 1990.
- "Das Porträt von Johann Adam Schall von Bell in Athanasius Kirchers 'China illustrata' " in: Roman Malek ed., Western learning and Christianity in China - The Contribution and Impact of Johann Adam Schall von Bell, S. J.（1592-1666）vol. 2, St. Augustin (Monumenta Serica), 1998.
- "Encounter of the European and Chinese Dragon in the 17th and 18th centuries", in Collection of essays of the symposium on the 40th anniversary of the founding of the History Department of Fu Jen Catholic University, Taipei (History Department of Fu Jen Catholic University), 2003.
- "Chinese illustrations of nature in the 17th and 18th centuries and their influence on European art, landscape gardening and urban landscapes", in Sinology as a Bridge between Chinese and Western Cultures: A Selection of Special Lectures of the Monumenta Serica Sinological Research Center, Taipei (Fu Jen Catholic University Press), 2010.
- "Ostasiatische Kunst, China und Europa", in Enzyklopädie der Neuzeit (1450-1850), Band 9, Stuttgart (J.B. Metzler Verlag), 2011.
- "The construction of Chinese style gardens in 18th century German by using the garden of Wörlitz (1764-1813) and the Chinese garden of Oranienbaum (1793-1797) as examples", in Face to Face. The transcendence of the arts in China and beyond – Historical Perspectives, II, 2, Rui Oliveira Lopes ed., Lisbon (Artistic Studies Research Centre, Faculty of Fine Arts University of Lisbon), 2014.
- Preliminary History of Fu Jen Catholic University, Co-editor, Taipei (Fu Jen Catholic University Press), 2015.

=== Published articles ===
- "The poet and Geisha Hsüeh Tao in the 8th and 9th centuries", in Historical Journal, Taipei, No. 39, 1984.
- "Chinese porcelain of the Ming period (1368-1644)", in Historical Journal, Taipei, No. 40, 1985.
- "Dokument 1: Augenzeugenbericht eines Studenten über das Massaker vom 4. Juni 1989", in China aktuell, Hamburg (Institut für Asienkunde, Berichtsmonat), 1989.
- "Max Beckmann", in Artist, Taipei, Nr. 187, 1990.
- "Brunelleschi and Renaissance architecture", in ARTIMA, Taipei, Nr. 44, 1993.
- "Cultural exchange between the East and the West with the example of a portrait of Adam Schall von Bell", in The National Palace Museum Monthly of Chinese Art, Taipei, Nr. 169, 1997.
- "The emergence of art history as a discipline of science and the art historian Aby Warburg", in Artist Magazine, Taipei, No. 265, 1997.
- "Kulturaustausch zwischen Europa und Asien in Natur und Landschaftdarstellungen", in Diskus, Göttingen (Heinrich-Böll-Stiftung), 1997.
- "Administrative buildings of the Taiwan governor's office, 1912-1919: a study of central and local administrative architecture", in Fu Jen Historical Journal, no.17, Taipei (Department of History of Fu Jen Catholic University), 2006.
- "Exchange between Eastern and Western architecture from the perspective of the central axis alignment with the example of the administrative buildings of Taiwan's governor's office", in Fu Jen Historical Journal, no.19, Taipei (Department and Graduate Institute of History of Fu Jen Catholic University), 2007.
- "Images of China's Imperial City of the 17th and 18th centuries in Europe", in Art Journal, no.2, Taipei (Taipei National University of the Arts, Art Faculty), 2008.
- "The Pineapple Images by Michael Boym and the Circulation of Pineapple Images in Europe in the 17th Century", in The National Palace Museum Research Quarterly, vol. 28, no. 1, Taipei, (The National Palace Museum Press), 2010.
- "A Study of Documents and Review of Research on the History of Exchange in Landscape Gardens in Germany", in Fu Jen Historical Journal, no.34, Taipei, (Department and Graduate Institute of History of Fu Jen Catholic University), 2015.
- "The Layout of the building complex in the Historicism style in the new Chengchung area of Taipei City during the Japanese colonial period", in Newsletter of the Association of Art History Research of Taiwan, issue 3, Taipei (Association of Art History Research of Taiwan), 2017.
- "Transitional Justice in the Spaces of the Humboldt Forum in Berlin and Freedom Square in Taipei", in: The Sculpture Research Semiyearly, issue 22, Taipei (Juming Museum), 2019.
- "Introduction Encounter of Christianity and Ethnic Minorities", in: Monthly Review of Philosophy and Culture, vol. 49, no. 6, pp. 1–2, 2022.
- "Chinoiserie Art that Drives Freedom and Enlightenment Thoughts in Europe", in Art and Collection, no. 364, pp. 18–25, 2023.
- "Discussing the Humanistic Spirit of European Art History from the Collection of the Pontifical Library of the Vatican", in: The National Palace Museum Monthly of Chinese Art, no. 483, pp. 20–33, 2023.
- "The Classic Renaissance Architecture of Europe —The Humanistic Spirit of Freedom, Justice, and Independence", in: The National Palace Museum Monthly of Chinese Art, December 2023.
- "Chinese-style Crafts: Prelude to the European Industrial Revolution", in Art and Collection, no. 376, pp. 44–51, January 2024.

== Academic lecture ==
- Dec. 11th 2021, "Chinese Elements in European Natural Landscape Gardens in the Age of Enlightenment", hosted by the National Palace Museum, a special speech at the Southern Branch of The National Palace Museum.
- April 28, 2023, "The Humanistic Essence of European Art History - On the Collection of the Apostolic Library of the Vatican", hosted by the National Palace Museum, a special lecture at the Northern Branch of The National Palace Museum.
- February 6th 2024, "Leibniz und das I Ging" presented at Humboldt University Berlin as part of the "Matters of Activity" series organized by the Cluster of Excellence.
- February 13, 2024, "Die Entwicklungsgeschichte Innovativer Konzepte in den Kunstsammlungen von China und Europa" (The Development History of Innovative Concepts in Art Collections of China and Europe) presented at the Center for Cultural Studies on Science and Technology in China, Technische Universität Berlin, as part of the Faculty I – Humanities and Educational Sciences series.
- June 18, 2024, "Blue-and-White Porcelain and Prelude to the European Industrial Revolution", presented at Sèvres - Musée National de la Céramique, Paris, France.
