= Ting Ting Chaoro =

Classical Meitei language song

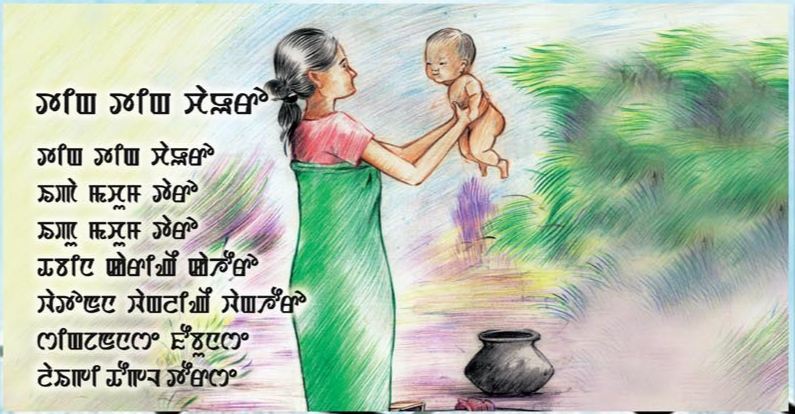
- An illustration of the Meitei language traditional song "Ting Ting Chaoro" of Kangleipak in Meitei script

Song
- Language: Meitei language (Manipuri language)

Ting Ting Chaoro (Meitei: ꯇꯤꯡ ꯇꯤꯡ ꯆꯥꯎꯔꯣ) is a classical Meitei language song. It is usually sung by mothers while bathing their children. It is also sung by the maibis (traditional Meitei priestesses) during Lai Haraoba festival.

== Song ==
Lyrics	Romanisation	English translation	Note(s)
ꯇꯤꯡ ꯇꯤꯡ ꯆꯥꯎꯔꯣ	Ting ting Chaoro	Grow fast grow fast	
ꯏꯄꯥ ꯃꯆꯨꯝ ꯇꯥꯔꯣ	Epa machum taro	Let the qualities of the father be there in you	
ꯏꯄꯨ ꯃꯆꯨꯝ ꯇꯥꯔꯣ	Epu machum taro	Let the qualities of the grandfather be there in you	
ꯊꯕꯤꯅ ꯀꯥꯔꯤꯉꯩ ꯀꯥꯍꯧꯔꯣ	Thabina karingei kahouro	Let you grow like the cucumber	
ꯅꯨꯃꯤꯠꯅ ꯋꯥꯡꯂꯤꯉꯩ ꯋꯥꯡꯍꯧꯔꯣ	Numitna wanglingei wanghouro	Let you rise as the sun rises.	

== Significance ==
It is believed that children inherit traits and behaviors from their grandparents. Singing the Ting Ting Chaoro song is thought to pass down the natural and cultural qualities of ancestors, along with their unique values. It also helps preserve cultural heritage through traditions and social-religious practices.

== In later versions ==
The modern song Ting Ting Chaoro is the second track of the album Ema Gi Wari, having two parts. The first part talks about the struggles and lives of Meitei people in the Barak and Surma Valleys, caused by a disaster. The "hey-hey heya-hey" chant sounds like a call used during hard work in the fields. The backing vocals create a feeling of unity and hope. This part of the song shows the start of a new civilization, from building homes by the river to opening a market. The second part is a traditional Meitei rhyme about raising a child. It stands for hope, a fresh start after disaster, and new beginnings after tragedy.

== See also ==
- Tha Tha Thabungton
- Te Te Tenawa
