= Average minute audience =

Television audience measurement

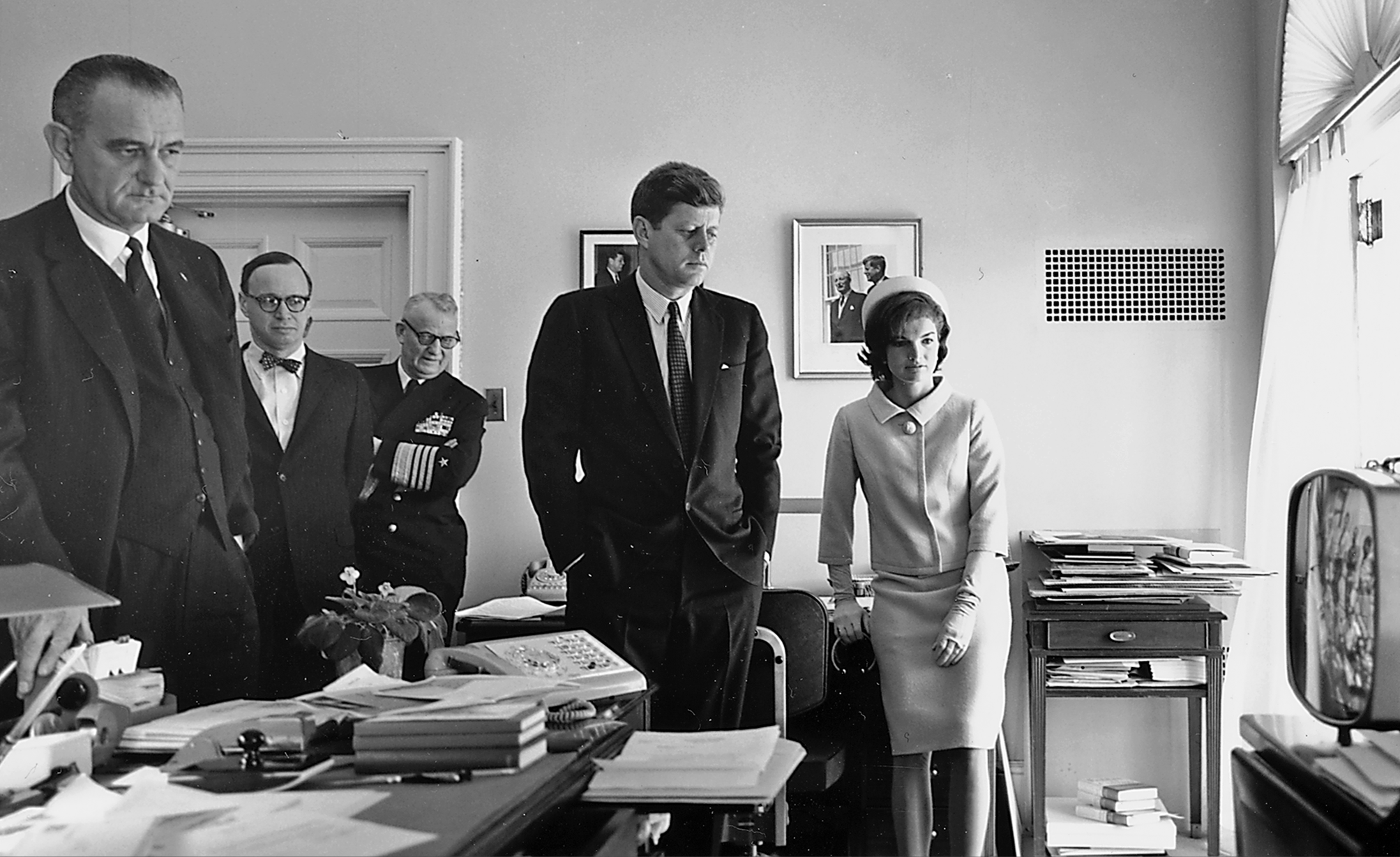
Kennedy, his wife Jacqueline, Johnson, and others watching the flight of Astronaut Shepard on television on May Fifth of 1961.

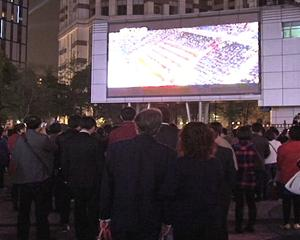
Viewers in Shanghai watching the 2010 Shanghai Expo opening ceremony

Average minute audience (AMA) is a type of measurement that directly reflects the audience size of a given program, historically referring more chiefly to television program AMA. It is calculated by averaging the number of viewers for each minute of programming throughout the event. It is commonly used by broadcasters, advertisers, and researchers to evaluate the performance and popularity of content.

AMA can vary depending on the target group, but generally the higher the value, the greater the popularity of the program. Target groups could include age, gender, ethnicity, religion, or any combination of these. AMA can also be reported for different time periods, such as live, same-day, or delayed viewing. The term "average minute audience" is a standard metric used in television audience measurement.

According to Nielsen Media Research, it is defined as "the average number of individuals or (homes or target group) viewing a TV channel, which is calculated per minute during a specified period of time over the program duration." It is often used to compare the viewership of different programs or events, such as sports leagues or awards shows. Despite its origin in television, AMA metrics have been used by streaming services such as Netflix, although sometimes without third-party involvement nor confirmation.

== Description ==
AMA is one of several ratings metrics provided by Nielsen Media Research, the leading company in TV audience measurement in the United States. Nielsen uses a sample of 40,000 homes and about 100,000 people that is demographically representative of the population as a whole to estimate the AMA for various TV channels and programs. Nielsen also provides other ratings metrics, such as rating, share, reach, and gross rating points.

AMA is often used to compare the viewership of different TV programs or events, especially in genres such as sports, news, and awards shows. For example, AMA can be used to rank the most-watched sports leagues or events in a given year or season. AMA can also be used to measure the impact of social media or other factors on TV viewership. For instance, AMA can be used to analyze how Twitter activity influences the audience size of live TV events.

The AMA has some limitations as a measure of TV audience size. For one thing, it does not account for the quality or engagement of the viewership. For example, a program with a high AMA may have a lot of viewers who are not paying attention or who are switching channels frequently. Conversely, a program with a low AMA may have a loyal and attentive fan base. Moreover, AMA does not capture the full extent of TV consumption across different platforms and devices. For example, AMA does not include online streaming services, video on demand, or mobile devices. Therefore, the AMA may underestimate the total audience size of some TV programs or events that have a significant online or mobile presence.

== History ==
The history of Average Minute Audience (AMA) is closely related to the history of television audience measurement, which is the process of estimating the number and characteristics of viewers of TV programs or events. AMA is a standard metric used in television audience measurement that was introduced by Nielsen Media Research in 2007 as a way to capture the average audience across all platforms, including live TV, DVR, video on demand, and online streaming. AMA replaced the previous metric of average quarter-hour (AQH) ratings, which only measured the audience in 15-minute intervals. AMA is now widely used by broadcasters, advertisers, and researchers to evaluate the performance and popularity of TV content.
