= Mo Li Hua =

Chinese folk song

Song
- Language: Chinese
- Genre: Folk
- Length: Around 2–3 minutes

Audio sample
- A machine-generated soundfile of a synthesizer piano arrangement: file; help

"Mo Li Hua" (Chinese: 茉莉花; pinyin: Mòlìhuā or Mòlihuā; lit. 'Jasmine Flower', (Note: Though most commonly known in English as the Jasmine Flower, the title has also been translated as Beautiful Jasmine Flower or Such a Beautiful Jasmine. It has also been transliterated as Mo Li Hua, Mo-Li Hua, Moli Hua and Molihua.) also called Sinfa) is a Chinese folk song of the "xiǎodiào" ("short tune") genre, from the Jiangnan region (south of the lower Yangtze river, around Suzhou, Shanghai and Hangzhou). The song is usually dated to the 18th century reign of the Qianlong Emperor (Qing dynasty), though some argue it is Ming era (pre-1644). Over time, many regional variations gained popularity in China and abroad.

The song was popular in China in the 18th century, and was first published in Europe in 1804. At the beginning of the 20th century, it was frequently played across China by travelling musicians. It was also adapted as temporary national anthem by Qing officials in Europe, and became popular there. Giacomo Puccini's 1920s opera Turandot uses it as the leitmotif for the titular fairy-tale Chinese princess.

The tune has been adapted and referenced in "various traditional Chinese and international music concert circuits, concerts by pop bands and solo singers, scholarly debates, new choral arrangements, and state-sponsored events as an emblem of national pride" and has been called a "significant national musical and cultural icon" of China, akin to Korea's "Arirang" and Japan's "Sakura Sakura". The song was widely used by the Chinese government in turn-of-the-century official events, (Note: such as the Hong Kong and Macau handovers, the 2004 Summer Olympics, the 2008 Summer Olympics, the 2010 Shanghai Expo opening ceremony, and many Central Committee of the Chinese Communist Party (CCP) meetings.) but became censored (Note: Chinese authorities censored mentions of the song and videos of then CCP general secretary Hu Jintao singing it.) after the 2011 Chinese pro-democracy protests, also called the Jasmine ("Mo li hua") Revolution, (Note: "茉莉花革命", Mo li hua Revolution) which used the song as a deniable and hard-to-block way of expressing support for democracy.

== History ==
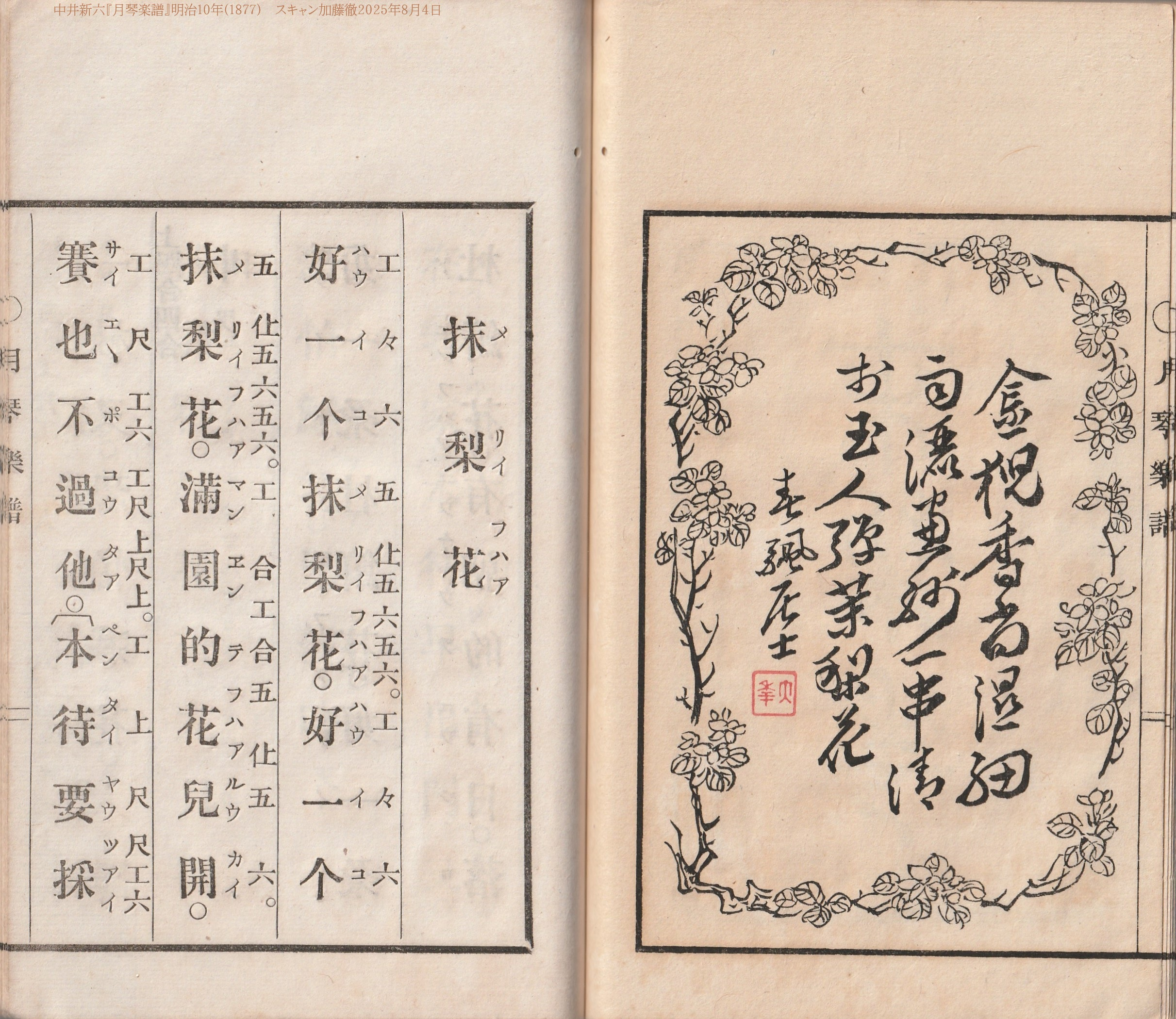
- Older lyrics to "Mo Li Hua". From a Japanese music book, Gekkin Gakufu (月琴楽譜) (1877) (Note: The song has been mistakenly titled as 抹梨花, which is pronounced similarly.)
- MIDI file based on this Japanese version

Melody as published by John Barrow in 1804

The song has been generally cited to originate during the Qianlong era (1735–1796) of the Qing dynasty, though ethnomusicologist Frederick Lau has noted that "we now know that the earliest "Molihua" lyrics appeared during the Ming dynasty Wanli period (1563–1620)." There are several regional versions of the song, with different lyrics and melody. One version of the song describes a custom of giving jasmine flowers, popular in the southern Yangtze delta region of China. Another, longer version describes the fear of plucking the flower. Through these variations, the song has also been called "Xian Hua Diao" ("Fresh Flower Melody") and in northern China, the song is sometimes called "La Mei Hua" ("Waxed Plum Blossom") or "Yu Mei Hua" ("Jade Plum Blossom"). The song descends from the "xiǎoqǔ/xiǎodiào" genre, which have the characteristics of being "usually multistanza in form and with uniform phrase structures and equal numbers of words." It has been played on ancient metal bells (bianzhong) and modern jade chimes. It uses the five note (pentatonic) scale ubiquitous in Chinese music. The tune is one of xiaodiao ("short tunes"), popular in Chinese urban areas.

British diplomat John Barrow, assistant attaché to George Macartney during the Macartney diplomatic mission to the imperial court of Qianlong, was the first to copy the tune into western notation, in 1793. When he published it in Europe in 1804, he noted that the tune seemed to be one of the most popular songs in China. His publication gave the song a "grand entrance on the world stage" and "widespread international popularity", according to ethnomusicology scholar Frederick Lau.

The song was one of the first Chinese folk songs to become widely known outside China. Beginning in 1896, the song was sometimes used as a temporary national anthem by the Qing Chinese officials in Europe before the adoption of "Cup of Solid Gold" as the official national anthem of the Qing state in 1911. The song was also analyzed in the unfinished three volume work of the 19th century Austrian-Czech music historian August Wilhelm Ambros, "History of Music," who remarks on the musical leaps within the melody. As such, the melody had already become well known among Western listeners when it was used by Giacomo Puccini in his opera Turandot (1926), boy choir air "Là, sui monti dell'est", where it is associated with 'Turandot's splendor'.

In 1982 the song found a place on a UNESCO list of recommended songs. When China regained sovereignty of Macau and Hong Kong, in 1999 and 1997, respectively, this music was played in the ceremonies. The song was said to be a favorite of the former CCP general secretary, Jiang Zemin (it was at his request that the song was played during the transfer ceremony in Hong Kong). The tune was played during Central Committee of the Chinese Communist Party (CCP) meetings, and was widely used as hold music by provincial government offices.

During the 2011 Chinese pro-democracy protests, many protesters reposted videos of Chinese Communist Party (CCP) officials singing "Mo Li Hua", and suggested playing it on cell phones as a form of antigovernment protest. The song was placed on authorities' list of online censored materials. Videos of the song, including at least one from an official event (a 2006 Kenyan students' welcome for CCP general secretary Hu Jintao, in which he sings the song and explains its importance), were removed from Chinese websites, and searches for the song's name were blocked. The censorship attracted widespread media attention and was difficult because of the popularity of the song and its association with Chinese culture and history. Physical jasmine flowers were also restricted. At least one new version of the song has been developed by the activists as a response, with lyrics translating in part as "You can’t find jasmine flowers in China/If you have one in your hand, Public Security will arrest you".

== Lyrics ==
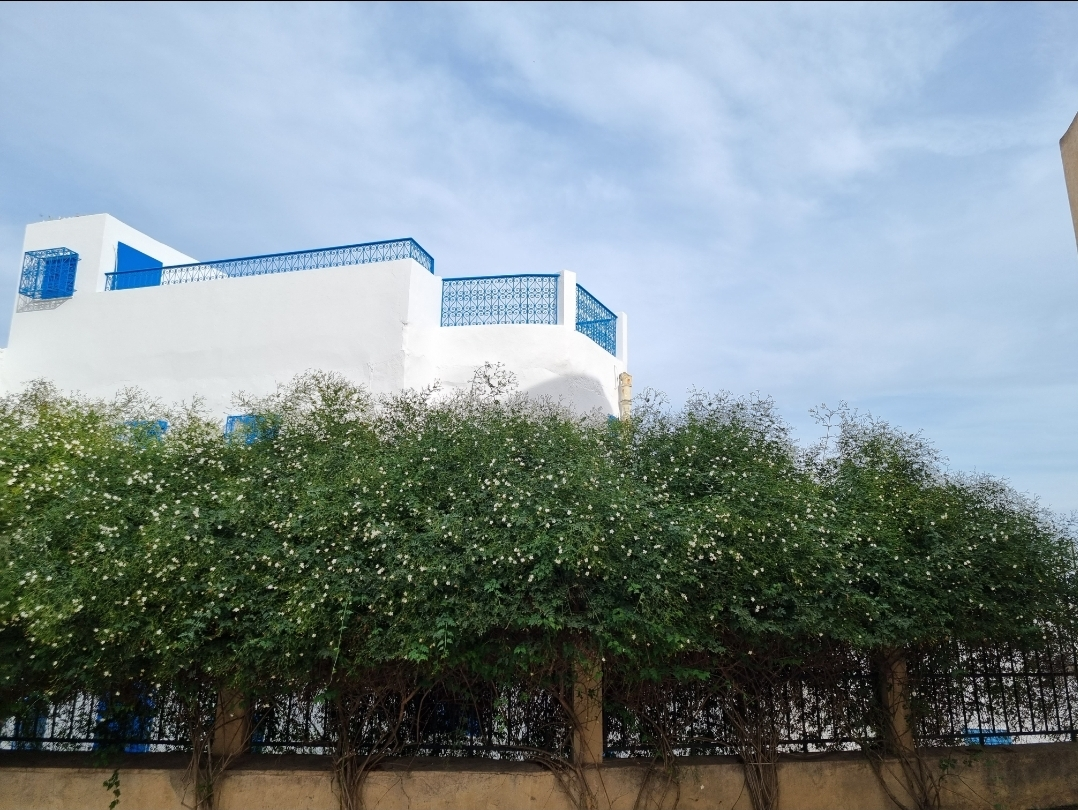
A hedge of blossoming jasmine in Tunisia

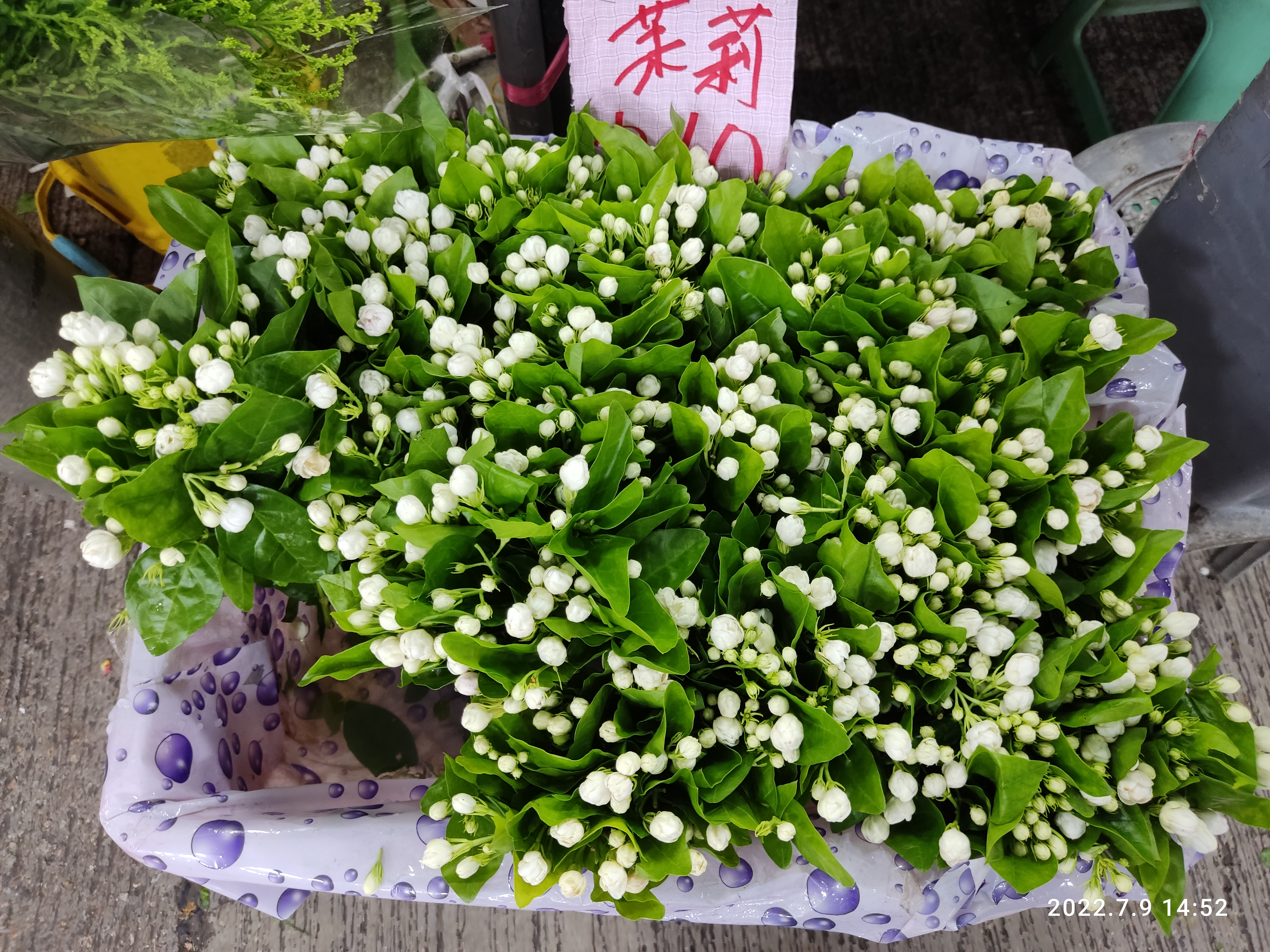
Jasmine for sale in Hong Kong, 2022

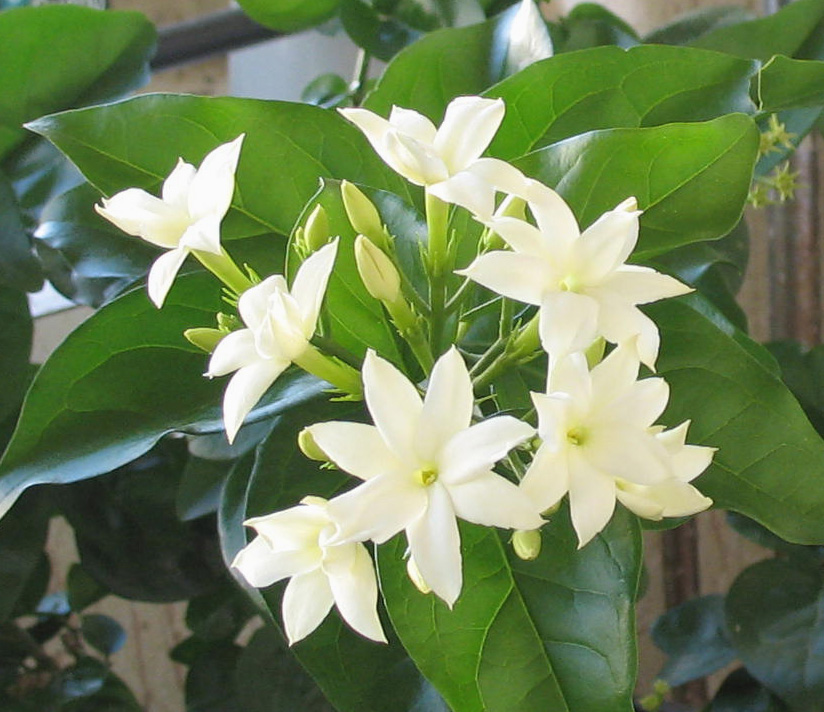
Close-up of the blossom

There are several versions of the song, with different lyrics and melody.

=== First variant ===
One of the popular versions lyrics goes:

==== Traditional Chinese ====
好一朵美麗的茉莉花
好一朵美麗的茉莉花
芬芳美麗滿枝椏
又香又白人人誇
讓我來將你摘下
送給別人家
茉莉花呀茉莉花

==== Simplified Chinese ====
好一朵美丽的茉莉花
好一朵美丽的茉莉花
芬芳美丽满枝桠
又香又白人人夸
让我来将你摘下
送给别人家 (Note: In some cases, biérén (别人) is replaced with qíngláng (情郎), meaning "male lover" (boyfriend))
茉莉花呀茉莉花

==== Pinyin ====
Hǎo yī duǒ měilì de mòlihuā
Hǎo yī duǒ měilì de mòlihuā
Fēn fāng měilì mǎn zhī yā
Yòu xiāng yòu bái rén rén kuā
Ràng wǒ lái jiāng nǐ zhāi xià
Sòng gěi biérén jiā
Mòlihuā ya mòlihuā

==== Literal translation fitting music ====
What a pretty Jasmine flower,
What a pretty Jasmine flower,
Nice to see and nice to smell!
Praiseworthy scent, and white as well!
You are what I'd like to pluck
– Giving other people (luck).
Oh so pretty, Jasmine Flower!

==== Poetic translation ====
Flower of jasmine, so fair!
Flower of jasmine, so fair!
Budding and blooming here and there,
Pure and fragrant all do declare.
Let me pick you with tender care,
Sweetness for all to share.
Jasmine fair, oh Jasmine fair.

==== Literary translation ====
What a Jasmine Brimming with Beauty
What a jasmine brimming with beauty!
What a jasmine brimming with beauty!
Aromas round twigs dance glee.
It's sweet 'n white, all praise highly.
Please allow me to pick thee,
as a gift ne'er twee.
Jasmine thee, yeah, Jasmine thee.

==== English version sing-along ====
Hǎo yī duǒ měi lì de mò li huā
Hǎo yī duǒ měi lì de mò li huā
Fragrant flowers filled the air,
Beautiful blossoms everywhere
Choose a blossom white and pure
Give to the one that you adore
Mò li huā, yā, mò li huā.

=== Second variant ===
Another popular versions' lyrics, with three strophes:

==== Traditional Chinese ====
好一朵茉莉花,
滿園花開香也香不過她,
我有心采一朵戴
又怕看花的人兒罵.

好一朵茉莉花,
茉莉花開雪也白不過她,
我有心采一朵戴,
又怕旁人笑話.

好一朵茉莉花,
滿園花開比也比不過她,
我有心采一朵戴,
又怕來年不發芽.

==== Simplified Chinese ====
好一朵茉莉花,
好一朵茉莉花,
满园花开香也香不过它,
我有心采一朵戴
又怕看花的人儿要将我骂.

好一朵茉莉花,
好一朵茉莉花,
茉莉花开雪也白不过它,
我有心采一朵戴,
又怕旁人笑话.

好一朵茉莉花,
好一朵茉莉花,
满园花开比也比不过它,
我有心采一朵戴,
又怕来年不发芽.

==== Hanyu Pinyin ====
Hǎo yī duo mòlìhuā,
Mǎn yuán huā kāi xiāng yě xiāng bùguò tā,
Wǒ yǒuxīn cǎi yī duo dài
kàn huā de rén er mà.
Hǎo yī duo mòlìhuā,
Mòlìhuā kāi xuě yě bái bu guò tā,
Wǒ yǒuxīn cǎi yī duo dài,
pángrén xiàohuà.
Hǎo yī duo mòlìhuā,
Mǎn yuán huā kāi bǐ yě bǐ bùguò tā,
Wǒ yǒuxīn cǎi yī duo dài,
Yòu pà láinián bù fāyá.

==== Literal translation ====
What a jasmine flower!
Of all the fragrant flowers and grasses in the garden,
there is none as fragrant as it.
I want to pluck one and wear it,
but the gardener would scold me.

What a jasmine flower!
When jasmine blooms.
not even snow is whiter.
I want to pluck one and wear it
But I'm afraid those around me would mock me.

What a jasmine flower!
Of all the blooms in the garden,
none compares to it.
I want to pluck one and wear it
But I'm afraid it wouldn't bud next year.

== In popular culture ==
=== In Western Classical music ===
The 19th century Russian composer Anton Arensky arranged the tune in the 1890s in one of his character pieces, Étude sur un thème chinois, Op. 25, No. 3.

==== Puccini's Turandot leitmotif ====
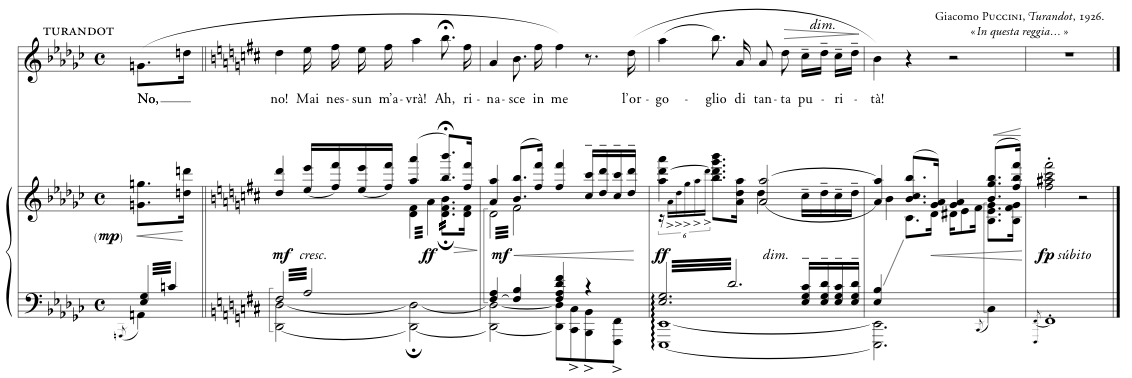
- The fairy-tale Chinese princess' leitmotif in Giacomo Puccini's 1926 opera Turandot, based on the "Mo Li Hua" melody
- Part of the aria "In questa reggia" from Turandot, part of which is shown in the score

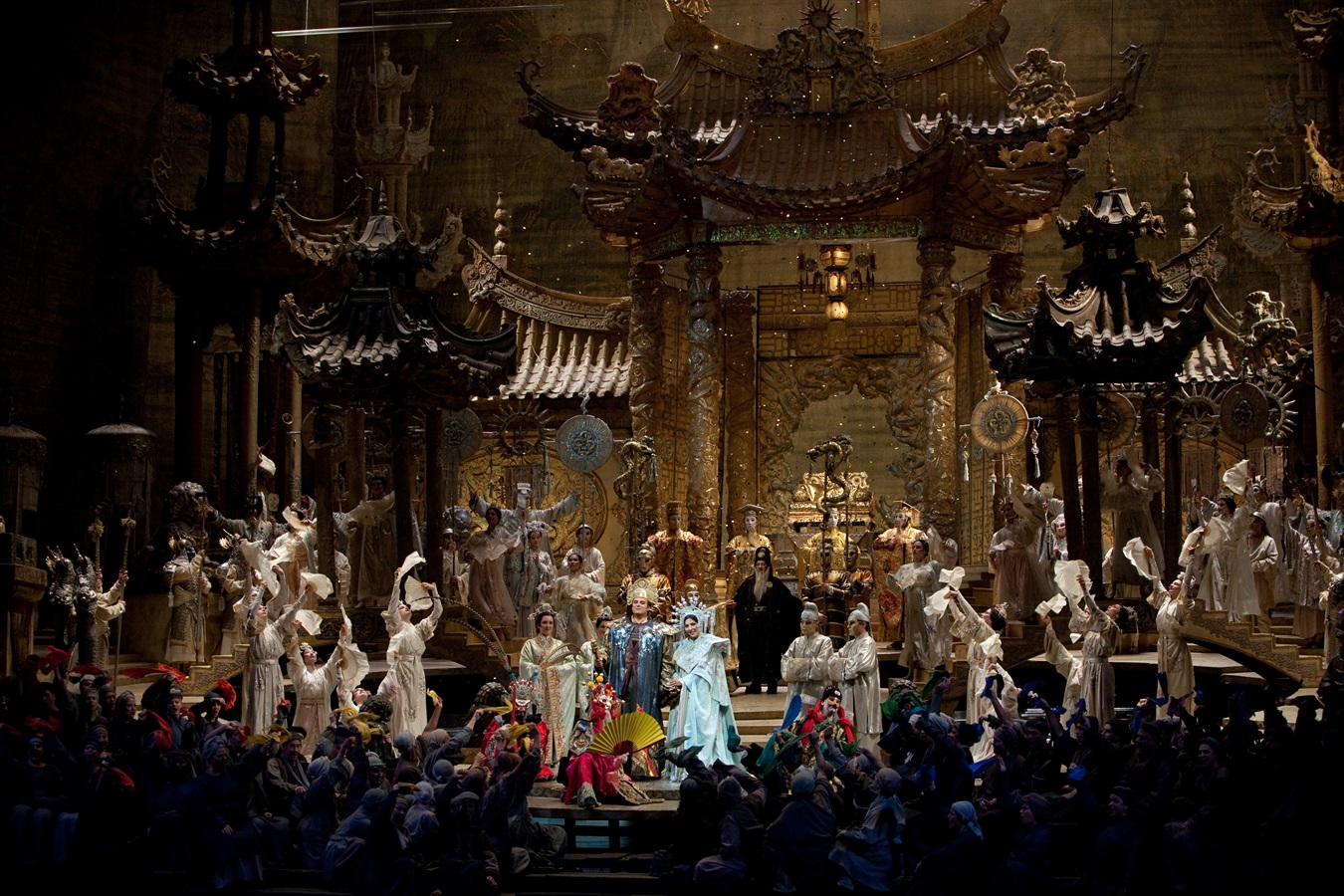
A production of Turandot by the Metropolitan Opera, New York

Puccini began working on his (ultimately incomplete and final opera piece) Turandot in March 1920 after meeting with librettists Giuseppe Adami and Renato Simoni. In his impatience, he began composition in January 1921, before Adami and Simoni had produced the text for the libretto. As with Madama Butterfly, Puccini strove for a semblance of authenticity by using music from the region, even commissioning a set of thirteen custom-made gongs.

Music historians have subsequently traced Puccini's fascination with Chinese music that led to the usage of the folk song as "thanks to a music box, coming from a former Italian diplomat who had served in China, which he received as a gift," who was likely the Baron Edoardo Fassini-Camoss. Three of the four melodies within this music box were incorporated by Puccini into his opera, the most memorable of which was the folk melody "Mo Li Hua." W. Anthony Sheppard, Marylin and Arthur Levitt Professor of Music at Williams College has traced this music box to have been likely the source of the Turandot leitmotif. Sheppard notes that the accompanying music sheets for this music box version which Puccini would have referenced also had mistakenly titled the name of the song as "Sinfa" (fresh flowers). Mo Li Hua serves as a leitmotif for Princess Turandot's splendor. In total, eight of the themes from Turandot appear to be based on traditional Chinese music and anthems.

Turandot is set in Imperial China; the tune serves as the leitmotif for the titular fairy-tale Chinese princess.

Puccini's Turandot rendition of "Mo Li Hua" has gained its own compositional popularity. The Chinese-American composer Tan Dun's Symphony 1997, which commemorated the handover of Hong Kong, uses a setting inspired by Puccini's. His 1990 Nine Songs: Water Spirit performance, where "Mo Li Hua" was referenced, has also been argued by composer Christian Utz to be an evolution upon Puccini's quotated version rather than having drawn from the original folk tune itself.

=== Notable performances ===
The song is said to have been a favourite of former paramount leader Jiang Zemin (CCP general secretary, 1989–2002), and was used in the 1997 Hong Kong handover ceremony at his request.

At the closing ceremonies of the 2004 Summer Olympics in Athens, Greece, Mo Li Hua was sung, partially unaccompanied by a young Chinese girl, and partially accompanied by the music by a Peking University students (whose version has been described as infused with a techno beat), to introduce the next Olympic Games site. An adaptation of the melody by Tan Dun and Wang Hesheng, chosen from more than 4,000 pieces, was played during the medal ceremonies at the Beijing 2008 Olympic Games as the introductory motif of the victory theme.

It was also performed at the 2010 Shanghai Expo opening ceremony by an orchestra with the pianist Lang Lang.

It was played at the ceremony awarding the 2010 Nobel Peace Prize to Liu Xiaobo.

=== In movies and television shows ===
Mo Li Hua appeared in a 1937 Hollywood movie The Good Earth (based on a novel by Pearl S. Buck). During World War II, some Hollywood films used the "Mo Li Hua" tune to represent the Chinese.

The tune, without lyrics, was also used as a musical theme in Avatar: The Last Airbender, a 2005–2008 television series.

=== Notable recordings ===
The song has been adapted by many artists around the world, for example by Kenny G. The YouTube comments for his performance later became an outlet for Chinese protesters to express support for democracy.

In 2009, Russian singer Vitas, during the Chinese premiere of his program Sleepless Night, at least has also performed "Mo Li Hua" (never included in digital download until then).

In 2013, the international Canadian-origin superstar Celine Dion performed the song in Mandarin on the Chinese CCTV-1 as part of its CMG New Year's Gala show welcoming in the 2013 Spring Festival/Chinese New Year. She sang in a duet with Chinese soprano and 2006 Grammy Award nominee classical/folk singer Song Zuying.

Since 2018, Kazakh singer Dimash Qudaibergen has performed this song in Mandarin on four occasions, three years in a row, during New Year and Chinese New Year celebration galas on various TV stations including a duet with the first Chinese Vocaloid dubbed "Luo Tianyi" as vocalist on 23 January 2020.

In 2018, the song was heard in the beginning of music video of Glukoza and Leningrad's song "Zhu-Zhu" ("Жу-жу"). The song was also in beginning of music video of 2021 song by Glukoza named "Moths" ("Мотыльки").

==== In games ====
In the 2016 turn-based strategy 4X video game developed by Firaxis Games, Civilization VI, "Mo Li Hua" is the civilization theme for China, progressing from the original melody during the ancient period to an orchestral evolution of the song in the modern period.

== See also ==
- Jasminum sambac, the species of jasmine the song is based on.
- Music of China
- List of Chinese folk songs
