= Bi Shang Guan =

2019 Chinese song

Single by Yi Ke Xiao Cong and Zhang Xiyun
- Language: Mandarin Chinese
- Released: 27 June 2019
- Genre: Chinese pop, Gufeng music
- Length: 4:44
- Composer: Zhou Mingcong
- Lyricist: Xiao Liu
- Producer: Zhou Mingcong

"Bi Shang Guan" (simplified Chinese: 壁上观; traditional Chinese: 壁上觀; pinyin: Bì shàng guān) is a Mandarin Chinese song performed by the Chinese guofeng music project Yi Ke Xiao Cong and singer Zhang Xiyun, also known as Zhang Xiaohan. It was released as a digital single on 27 June 2019. The song was written by lyricist Xiao Liu and composed by Zhou Mingcong, who was also credited as producer.

== Background and composition ==
"Bi Shang Guan" is associated with the neochinese popular music. The song's lyrics and promotional materials draw on imagery of Dunhuang Buddhist cave murals, including references to apsaras, palace scenes, musical instruments and desert landscapes. According to a 2024 report by Jiemian News, Zhou Mingcong described the song's concept as a story about a traveller or archaeologist who enters a mural world in the desert, witnesses the splendour and decline of an ancient civilization, and then wakes from the vision.

The original recording was arranged by Gan Hu, with instrumental and production credits including guitars by Wang Xiaodong and Gu Xiong, pipa by Sun Ying, backing vocals by Zeng Jie and mixing by Gu Xiong. The song has been described in Chinese media as combining pop, traditional vocal elements and Chinese opera-influenced singing.

== Release ==
The single was released on 27 June 2019. Douban Music lists the release under Zhang Xiaohan and gives the release date as 27 June 2019. A same-day promotional article described it as a new single by the guofeng music team Yi Ke Xiao Cong, performed by Zhang Xiaohan. MusicBrainz also lists a China release event on 27 June 2019 for a two-track release by Yi Ke Xiao Cong and Zhang Xiyun, including the song and an instrumental version.

== Cover versions ==
Several cover versions and remixes were released after the song's renewed popularity. Deng Yujun, also known as Dengshenme Jun, released a version of "Bi Shang Guan" in August 2024. Apple Music also lists a 2024 single of "Bi Shang Guan" by Yi Ke Xiao Cong and Xiao K, released by Chengdu Changhe Culture Development Co., Ltd.
