= Wang Hesheng =

Wang Hesheng may refer to:

- Wang Hesheng (composer) (born 1955), Chinese composer
- Wang Hesheng (politician) (born 1961), Chinese politician
