= Expo 2010 opening ceremony =

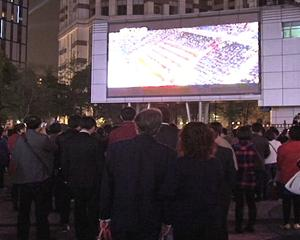
Citizens watching the ceremony from Nanjing road

The 2010 Shanghai Expo opening ceremony (Chinese: 中国2010年上海世界博览会开幕式) occurred on April 30, 2010 at the Shanghai World Expo Cultural Center in Shanghai, People's Republic of China, a day before the opening of the Expo 2010.The opening ceremony was planned and designed by ECA2's founder, Yves Pepin.

== Pre-ceremony ==
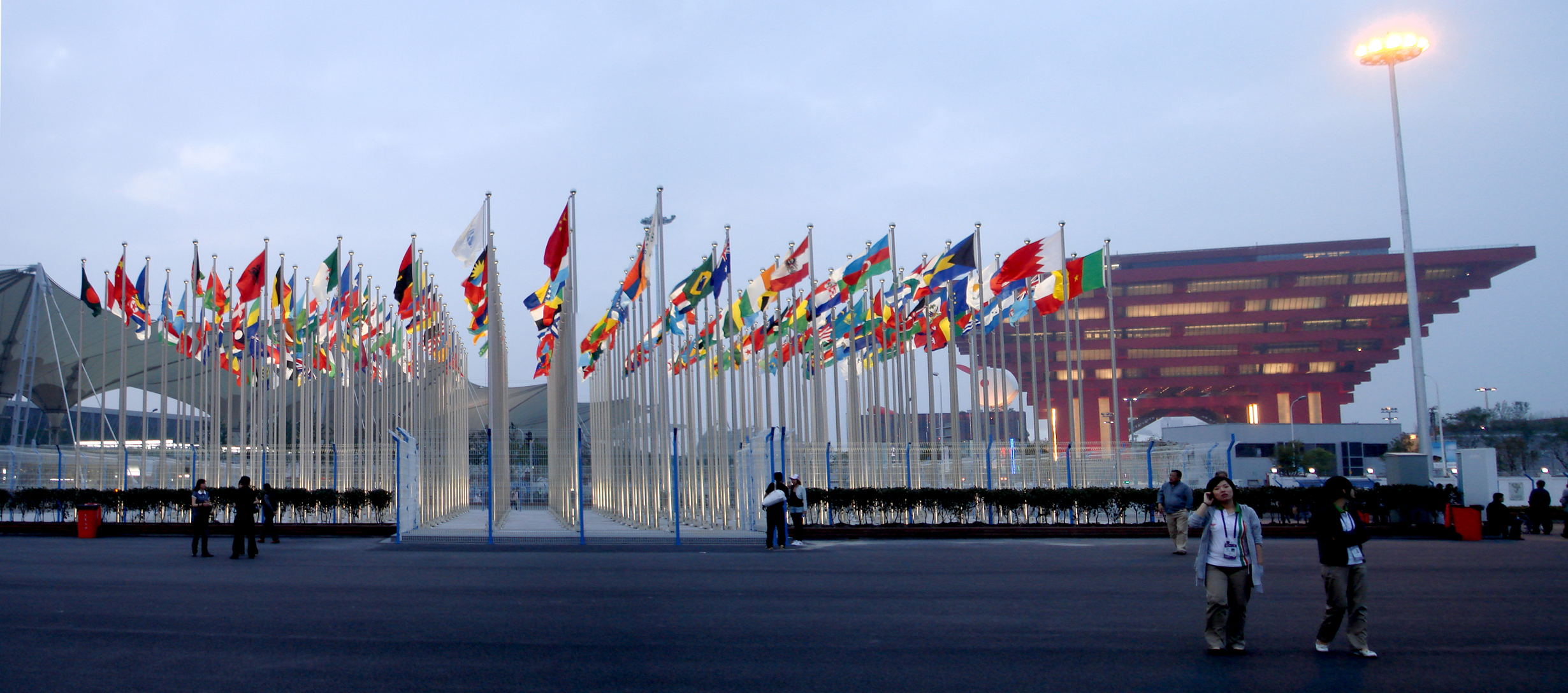
All nation flags raised

On April 29, 2010 General Secretary Hu Jintao of the Chinese Communist Party (CCP) sat down with former Chairman Lien Chan of the Kuomintang in a pre-expo meeting.

In the morning of April 30, the flags of 189 nations, 57 international organizations, the World expo bureau flag and the Shanghai expo flag were all raised at the expo venues.

== Outdoor opening fireworks ==
The event began at 8:10 pm with a massive river side display of fireworks and lights.

== Indoor ceremony ==
=== Leader entrances ===
Chinese leader Hu Jintao enters Expo Culture center with many world leaders. Twenty foreign heads of state or government attended the opening ceremony:

- Armenian President Serzh Sarkisyan
- Cambodian Prime Minister Hun Sen
- Republic of the Congo President Denis Sassou-Nguesso
- (Europe) European Commission President José Manuel Barroso
- French President Nicolas Sarkozy and his wife Carla Bruni
- Gabonese President Ali Bongo Ondimba
- Kazakh Prime Minister Karim Masimov
- Kenyan President Mwai Kibaki
- (North Korea) Kim Yong Nam, President of the Presidium of the Supreme People's Assembly of the Democratic People's Republic of Korea
- South Korean President Lee Myung-bak
- Malawian President Bingu wa Mutharika
- Malian President Amadou Toumani Touré
- Maltese President George Abela
- Micronesian President Emanuel Mori
- Mongolian President Tsakhiagiin Elbegdorj
- Dutch Prime Minister Jan Peter Balkenende
- Palestinian President Mahmoud Abbas
- Seychelles President James Alix Michel
- Turkmen President Gurbanguly Berdymukhamedov
- Vietnamese Prime Minister Nguyen Tan Dung

In addition, speakers of legislative bodies, deputy heads, and ministers of over 20 other countries also attended the opening ceremony. Just a few hours before the opening ceremony, the Maltese President, George Abela suffered from an accident, which left his second Lumbar vertebrae slightly damaged. He was taken to the Ruijin Hospital in Shanghai, and therefore couldn't attend the ceremony. Chinese leader Hu Jintao paid him a visit at the hospital the following day. Hong Kong and Macau Special administrative region chief exec Donald Tsang and Fernando Chui both attended with a group of delegates.

=== Presentations ===
The song "Harmonious Gathering" (和谐欢歌) was performed by Hong Kong's Jackie Chan and PRC's Song Zuying. The PRC flag was raised, and the March of the Volunteers was played. Then the international bureau exposition flag was raised, and the expo song was played. This was followed by the raising of the Shanghai Expo flag and the playing of the Shanghai Expo song. Then the flag-bearers of 246 participating countries and international organizations paraded out. Wang Qishan, Vice Premier of China and BIE president Jean-Pierre Lafon both gave a speech. Hu Jintao then opened up the expo performances with an official statement.

== Performances ==
The first song (相约上海) was sung by PRC's Mao Amin, Lau Yuan-yuan (刘媛媛) and Taiwan's Wakin Chau. They were also accompanied by dancers. An orchestra featuring PRC pianist Lang Lang played "Jasmine Flower", "The Blue Danube", "New Shanghai concerto" (新上海协奏曲), and "Yangtze river song" (长江之歌).

The theme song "Better city, Better life" was followed and sung by United States's Jonathan Buck and Siedah Garrett. An instrumental performance of "Brave Bugle" (勇敢的号角) is performed by a New Zealand troupe (纽西兰毛利艺术团). Japan's Shinji Tanimura then perform the song "star" (星). Afterwards the song "A type of love" (一种爱) was performed by the South Africa's Soweto Gospel Choir. Italy's Andrea Bocelli then followed up with a performance of "Nessun dorma".

The expo theme song (致世博) was performed by PRC's Huang Ying (黄英), Liao Chang (廖昌永), Tan Jing and Sun Nan. Two Tibetan orphans who survived the earlier 2010 Yushu earthquake joins the stage.

== Outdoor performances ==
=== Fireworks ===
Fireworks climax viewed from under Nanpu Bridge towards the SW

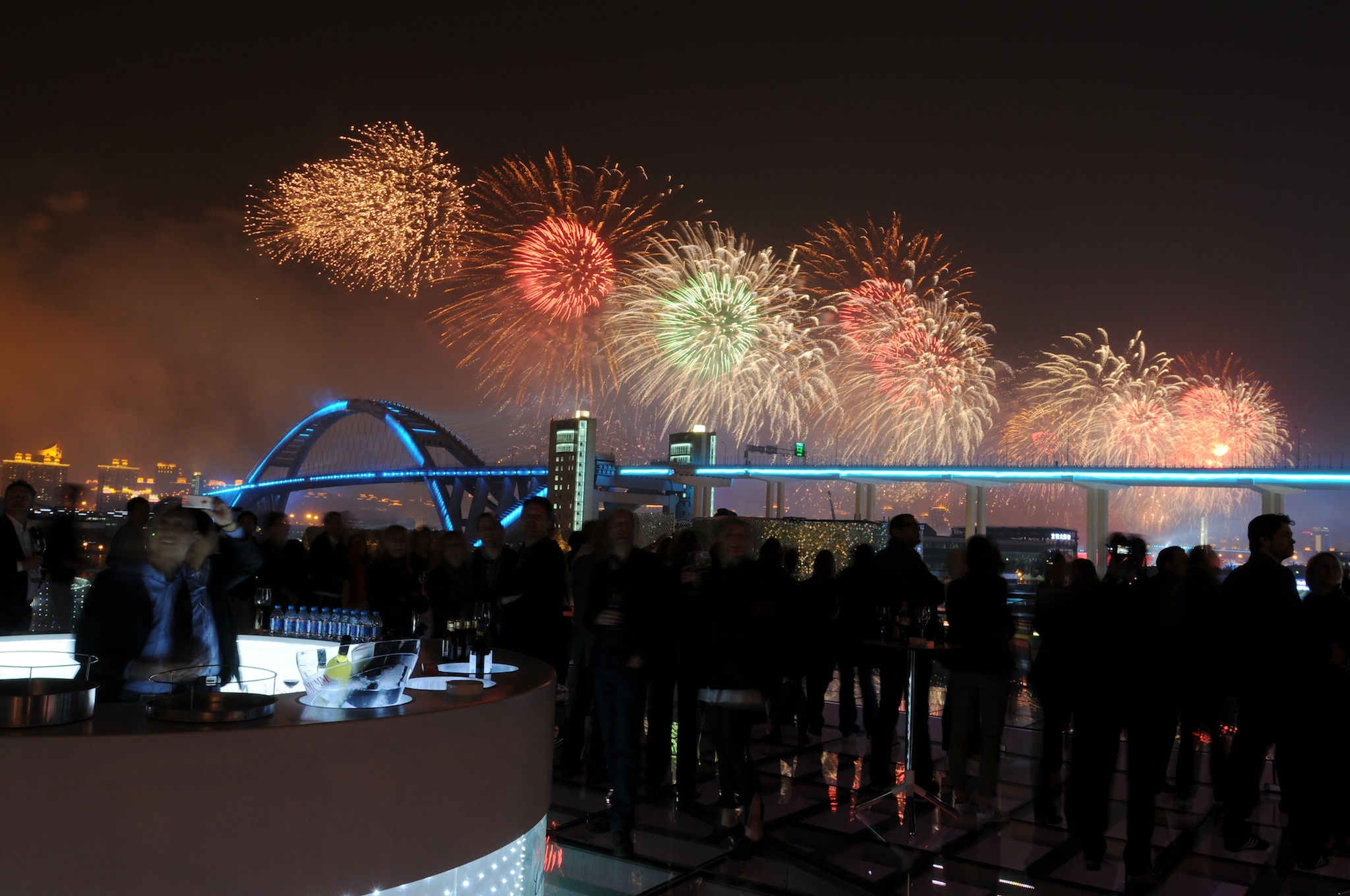
Opening ceremony

The 30-minute outdoor ceremony took place along a 3.4-km stretch of the Huangpu River in central Shanghai. It set numerous world records, such as the biggest LED screen, the largest searchlight installation and one of the largest pyrotechnic displays ever created. The outdoor portion was produced by David Atkins enterprise.

=== Part 1 ===
First music piece was "China welcomes you" (中国欢迎你) accompanied by Spring Festival Overture. First music of that piece was "Civilization" (文明之光), followed by "Better City, Better Life" (城市，让生活更美好), followed by "Urban Rhapsody" (都市协奏曲). In this part was included the track "The Dragon" composed by Vangelis in his conceptual album China

=== Part 2 ===
Second piece was "Happy at expo" (欢聚在世博) accompanied by Waltz The Blue Danube, Violin concerto, Butterfly Lovers' Violin Concerto. First music of that piece was "One World, One Home" (同一世界，同一家园), followed by "Water of Life" (生命之水).

=== Part 3 ===
Third piece was "World celebrate together"(世界同欢庆) accompanied by the piece (在快速机器上的短暂骑行), "Oh, destiny goddess" (哦！命运女神), Ode to Joy (欢乐颂), "Night of fire festival" (火把节之夜), "Good beijing news to mountain village" (北京喜讯到山寨), White jasmine (茉莉花).

== Concerts ==
In a separate concert Song Zuying performed with Taiwan's Jay Chou in a celebration of the opening ceremony.

== See also ==
- List of participants at the Expo Shanghai 2010
- 2008 Summer Olympics opening ceremony
- 2008 Summer Paralympics opening ceremony
- 2009 East Asian Games opening ceremony
