= Zhongguo feng (music) =

Music genre

- Stylistic origins: Chinese music; hip hop; pop; rock; folk; R&B; jazz
- Cultural origins: Early 2000s
- Typical instruments: Vocals; pipa; erhu; piano; guitar; violin; drums; dizi; gong; yangqin

Regional scenes
- Mainland China, Taiwan, Hong Kong

Other topics
- Mandopop; Cantopop; Hokkien pop; C-pop; Music of China

Zhongguo feng
- Traditional Chinese: 中國風
- Simplified Chinese: 中国风
Transcriptions
Standard Mandarin
- Hanyu Pinyin: Zhōngguó fēng

Zhongguo feng (simplified Chinese: 中国风; traditional Chinese: 中國風; pinyin: zhōngguó fēng; lit. 'China style'), also known as guofeng music (simplified Chinese: 国风音乐; traditional Chinese: 國風音樂; pinyin: guófēng yīnyuè; lit. 'China-style music') is a genre of Chinese popular music considered to adopt a more "traditional" style than regular modern popular music, with vocals, melody and lyrics influenced by Chinese opera (xiqu) and musical performing arts (quyi). It is different from Chinese classical music (guoyue) and folk music (min'ge) in that, Zhongguo feng is essentially contemporary pop music infused with elements of Chinese culture and philosophy, and also often with a strong thematic emphasis on cultural pride; while the latter two focus more on traditional oriental instrumental rhythms and vocal performance.

While Mandopop singers such as Huang An, Sarah Chen and Tu Honggang already gained popularity in Mainland China and Taiwan during the 1990s, Taiwanese singer-songwriter Jay Chou is typically regarded as the first Zhongguo feng artist to have widespread influence in Greater China. Following the success of Chou's early works including "Wife" (娘子) and "East Wind Breaks" (東風破), the genre emerged in the C-pop music scene in the early 2000s. Contemporary singers such as Phoenix Legend, Li Yugang, Zhou Shen and Sa Dingding are also prominent examples of Zhongguo feng, particularly in the era of music streaming services.

Gufeng music is a similar but different music genre that is often confused with Zhongguo feng, with gufeng referring more specifically to modern musical compositions and tanci-like songs with similar instrumental and vocal styles of classical music.

== History ==
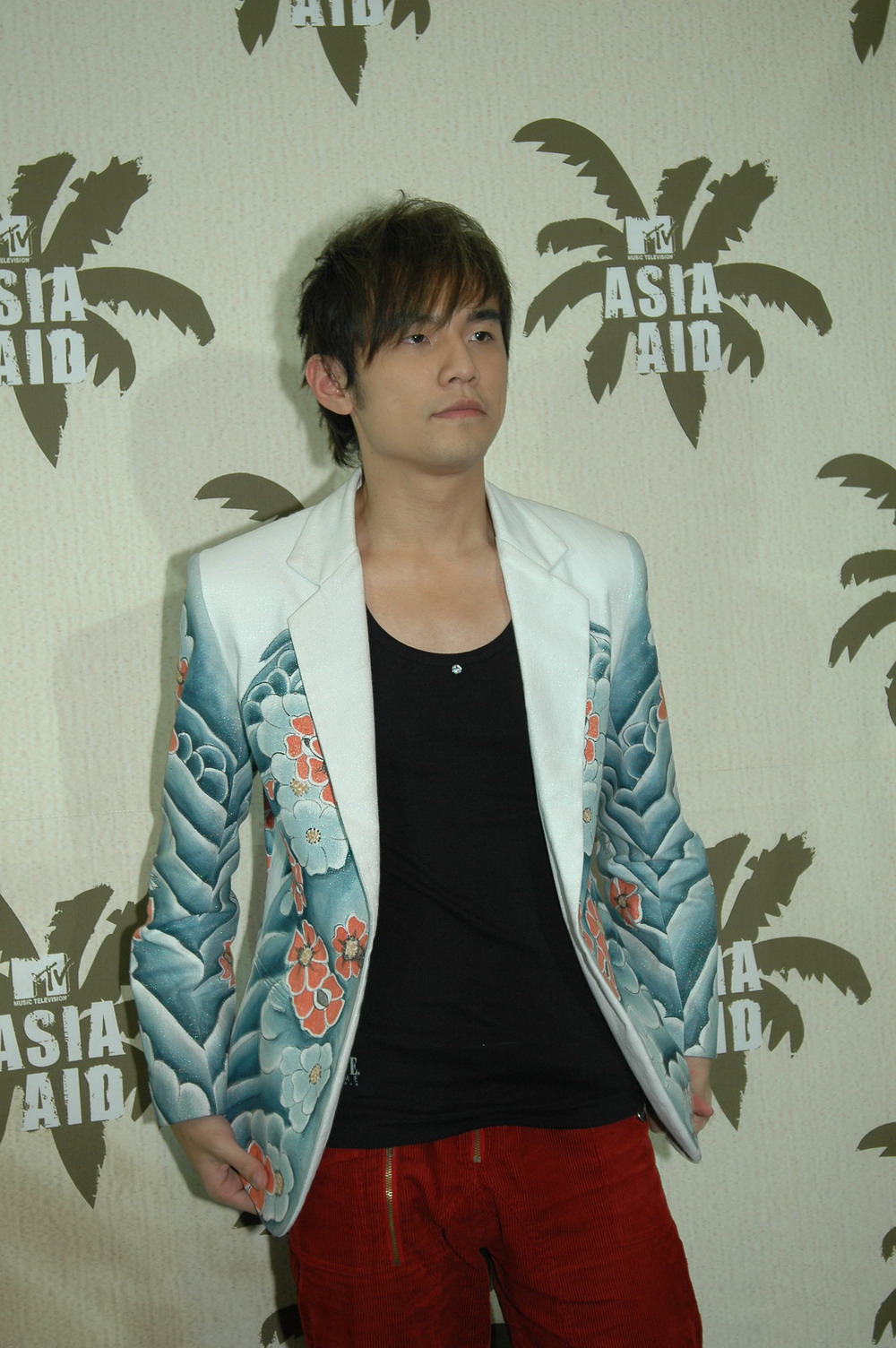
Jay Chou is regarded as a central figure of modern Zhongguo feng music.

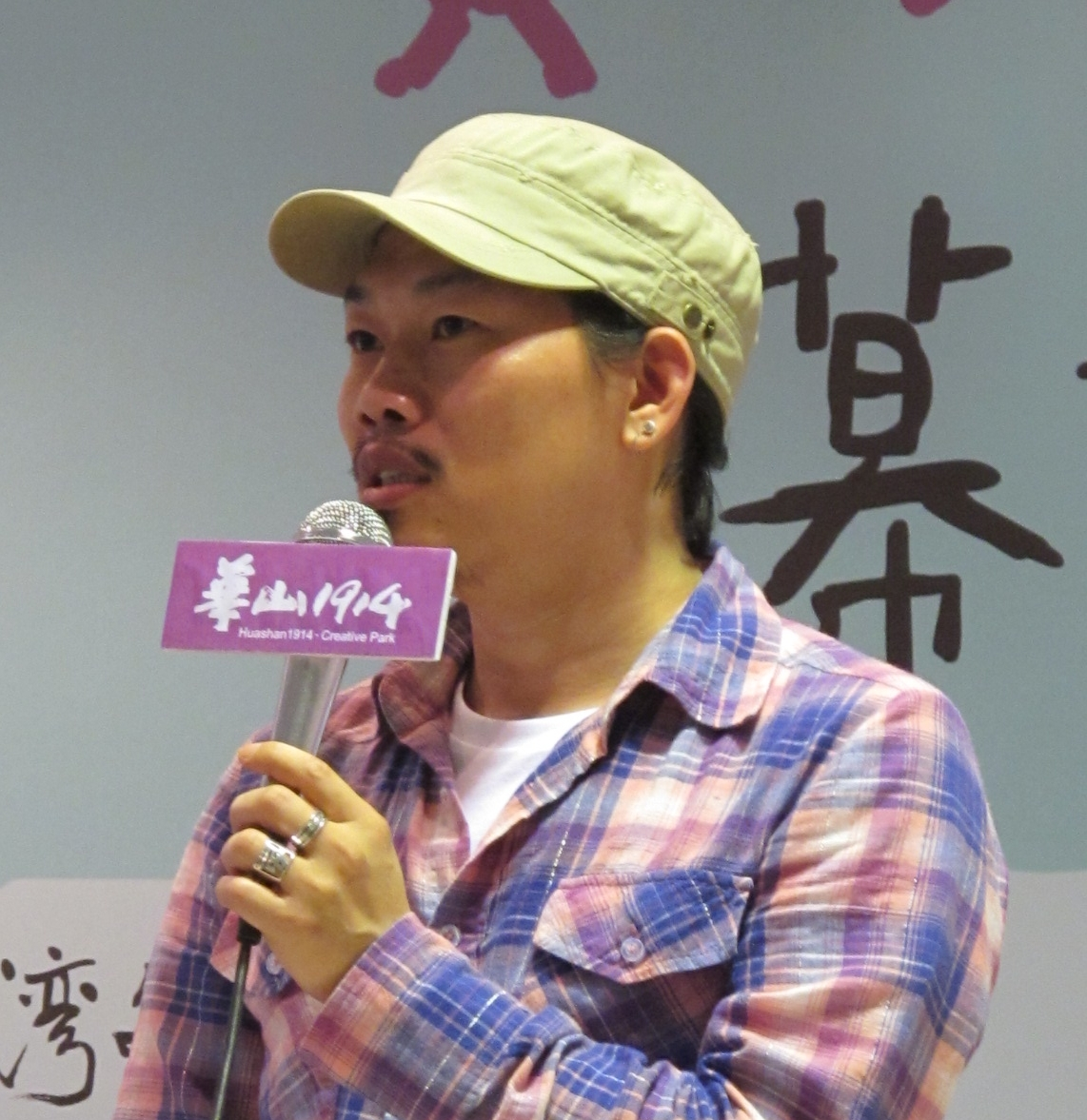
Vincent Fang is an acclaimed Zhongguo feng lyricist.

It is hard to pinpoint the exact origins of Zhongguo feng music, although Jay Chou is largely credited as an influential figure in modern Zhongguo feng music in the early 2000s. Music ethnographers and researchers have also studied Zhongguo feng in relation to the sociocultural and political conditions in different time periods such as the May Fourth movement and the end of Cultural Revolution.

Departing from the days of revolutionary and ultra-nationalistic songs during Mao's dictatorship until the end of the 1970s, the 1980 saw the introduction of rock music into China, with its people beginning to embrace new steady and upbeat rhythms. Western bands were introduced into the Mainland market in the 1990s, with genres such as Western rock, hip hop and R&B becoming a la mode with Chinese youths. Towards the end of the 1990s or early 2000s, big names such as David Tao gradually began embracing erhus or qins. Slowly, more singers also began infusing age-old traditions with Western hip hop.

Throughout Jay Chou's discographies in the 2000s, many of his top-rated tracks were known as Zhongguofeng. Featured in his debut album Jay in 2000, "Wife" is one of Jay Chou's most famous songs in the Zhongguo feng music genre. Leehom Wang is also known for his brand of Zhongguo feng music, known as "chinked-out", since 2004. Other factors that contributed to the popularity of Zhongguo feng music include the efforts of the Chinese state in building a sense of nationalism, and national pride from the successful 2008 Beijing Olympics. The continued popularity of Zhongguo feng music can be attributed to various platforms such as online music platforms (e.g Baidu music, QQ Music, KuGou, XiaMi Music), social media (e.g Sina Weibo, WeChat), live performances of Zhongguo feng music and television shows (e.g Singer (Hunan Television), Voice of China and Xingguang Dadao).

== Characteristics ==
Broadly, Zhongguo feng music usually use the minor scale or the pentatonic scale, or include traditional Chinese instruments in the music arrangement, as well as using language with elements of ancient music and scenery. It can be distinguished through its fusion of classical Chinese melody and global music styles, or through the usage of traditional cultural elements in its lyrics, either implicitly or explicitly in contemporary contexts.

=== Genres ===
In his book, Vincent Fang highlights how there is no fixed genre for Zhongguo feng music; more important is its use of lyrics, tunes and arrangements. As such, many popular Zhongguo feng music have employed a diverse range of genres, including R&B, rock and roll, hip hop, punk, jazz, country music and Peking opera. Zhongguo feng music is also increasingly being presented in more forms.

For example, Chou and Fang's 2003 song, "The East Wind Breaks" (东风破; dōngfēng pò), from his fourth album Yeh Hui-mei adopts a typical Chinese melody, but is composed in an R&B style. The song is distinctive for the effect of "a musician playing a Chinese pipa in a classic called 'Dong Feng Po' with a mild sense of melancholy," while Chou's rapping injects a sense of "modernity".

=== Instruments and setups ===
Many Zhongguo feng songs use the pentatonic scale which uses five notes per octave, in contrast to the familiar heptatonic scale which uses seven notes per octave.

Zhongguo feng pop music typically involves the use of traditional Chinese instruments, such as the pipa (stringed Chinese lute), guzheng (Chinese zither), erhu (Chinese two-stringed fiddle), dizi (Chinese bamboo flute), yangqin (Chinese hammered dulcimer), dagu (Chinese bass drum), gong, paiban (clapper) and others. Zhongguo feng music can also include the use of Western instruments such as the piano, guitar, violin and cello.

For instance, while Jay Chou performs in a western form using a rhythm and blues style, he inserts Chinese melodies, themes, and rhythms into the song. "East Wind Breaks" features a typical Chinese melody performed in R&B style, with its instrumentation creating a Chinese atmosphere with a Chinese pipa.

=== Lyrics ===
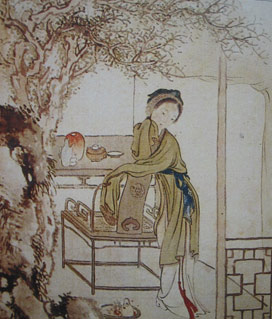
A scene from Dream of the Red Chamber, one of China's Four Great Classical Novels.

The lyrics of Zhongguo feng music typically makes allusions to aspects of Chinese cultures, which can include tales, superstitions, legends, word games, paintings, regional operatic and theatrical forms, and even children's songs. Zhongguo feng songs may also make references to the Chinese landscape in a romanticised tone, celebrating their pertinence to a version of China that is culturally familiar, if stereotyped.

Vincent Fang, a lyricist well-known for his collaborations with Jay Chou, is held at the forefront of Zhongguo feng music, with his works often treated as poetry of great artistic merit that garners high critical regard. Fang uses a poetic style which he calls "suyan yunjiaoshi" (素颜韵脚诗) in his lyrics to evoke vivid imageries of traditional Chinese culture.

In the lyrics of "East Wind Breaks" written by Fang, Jay Chou expresses sadness and loneliness subtly, similar to traditional Chinese poetry:

谁在用琵琶弹奏 一曲东风破
岁月在墙上剥落 看见小时候
犹记得那年我们都还很年幼
而如今琴声幽幽 我的等候 你没听过

Who uses pipa to perform Dong Feng Po
I can see my childhood when paints peel off from the wall
And remembering those were the old days when we were young
But now you still haven't heard of the melancholy in my pipa music

The title of Leehom Wang's "Mistake in the Flower Fields" (花田错; huātián cuò) references a well-known story in Beijing opera of the same name. The song lyrics also alludes to classical Chinese works such as the novel "Dream of the Red Chamber" (红楼梦; hónglóumèng) and mentions "butterfly chalice" which could be a reference to the film, The Butterfly Chalice, or the legend of The Butterfly Lovers. The lyrics also uses imageries that are common in operas and poems, such as "paper window" and "candle light".

=== Music videos ===
Through an online questionnaire conducted with Chinese respondents, researchers identified the various classical imageries that are commonly associated with Zhongguo feng music videos. The five main categories include: animals (swallows, butterflies, horses, wolves), sceneries (bridges, pavilions, mountains, towers, cities, temples), historical human figures (Cao Cao, Li Bai, Huo Yuanjia), natural phenomena (bright moon, white clouds, lakes, light rains), and seasons and festivals (Spring Festival, Spring Lantern Festival, Tomb Sweeping Day, Mid-Autumn) imageries.

== Notable artists ==
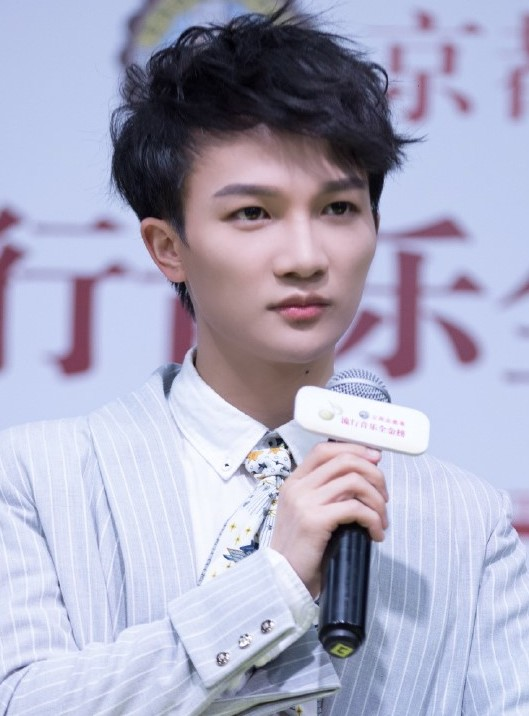
Zhou Shen, a guofeng singer notable for his countertenor vocal range

Zhongguo feng has been supported by several Taiwanese singers such as Jay Chou, Wang Leehom, David Tao, Kenji Wu, Tank (Taiwanese singer), Zhou Shen and girl group S.H.E.

== Culture and politics ==
=== 'Chineseness', imagined communities and gender ===
Researchers have explored the impact of Zhongguo feng music on the notions of 'Chineseness' and imagined communities. Lin discusses about how Zhongguo feng music, which is both trendy and traditional, helps connect youths to music fads while at the same time reinforcing their internalisation of Chinese heritage. Similarly, Wang examined how the global popularity of Mandopop artists "induces the notion of an 'imagined community' of Chinese listeners that are dispersed across time and space, enabling both music and Chineseness to cross borders". The idea of cultural China "restores geographical determinism or the accommodation of China with a territorial mainland", as a kind of "pan-national fundamentalism".

Through an analysis of six Hong Kong Zhongguo feng music videos, researchers Chow and de Kloet highlight that they paradoxically evoke and undermine Chineseness at the same time. These videos undermine Chineseness by rendering it as a distant gaze, as ambiguous space and ongoing struggles, as well as through its feminisation of Chineseness, which opens up dialogue for questions on history and gender performance. They posit that the female voices of the Hong Kong Zhongguo feng offer: "the courage to think otherwise, to feminise and thereby problematise Chineseness, to suggest that the Chinese tradition, value and culture evoked so positively in the male-dominated Zhongguo feng pop may not necessarily be something to celebrate if you are not one of them".

Chow and de Kloet also highlight the sharp gender division of Zhongguo feng in terms of Hong Kong (female-dominated) and in Taiwan (male-dominated) where Zhongguo feng has almost been monopolised Jay Chou and other male artists. In a related note, it is also worth mentioning about Taiwanese girl group S.H.E's controversy over their single Chinese Language (中国话; zhōngguó huà) for being deemed as too pro-Beijing.

=== Geopolitics ===
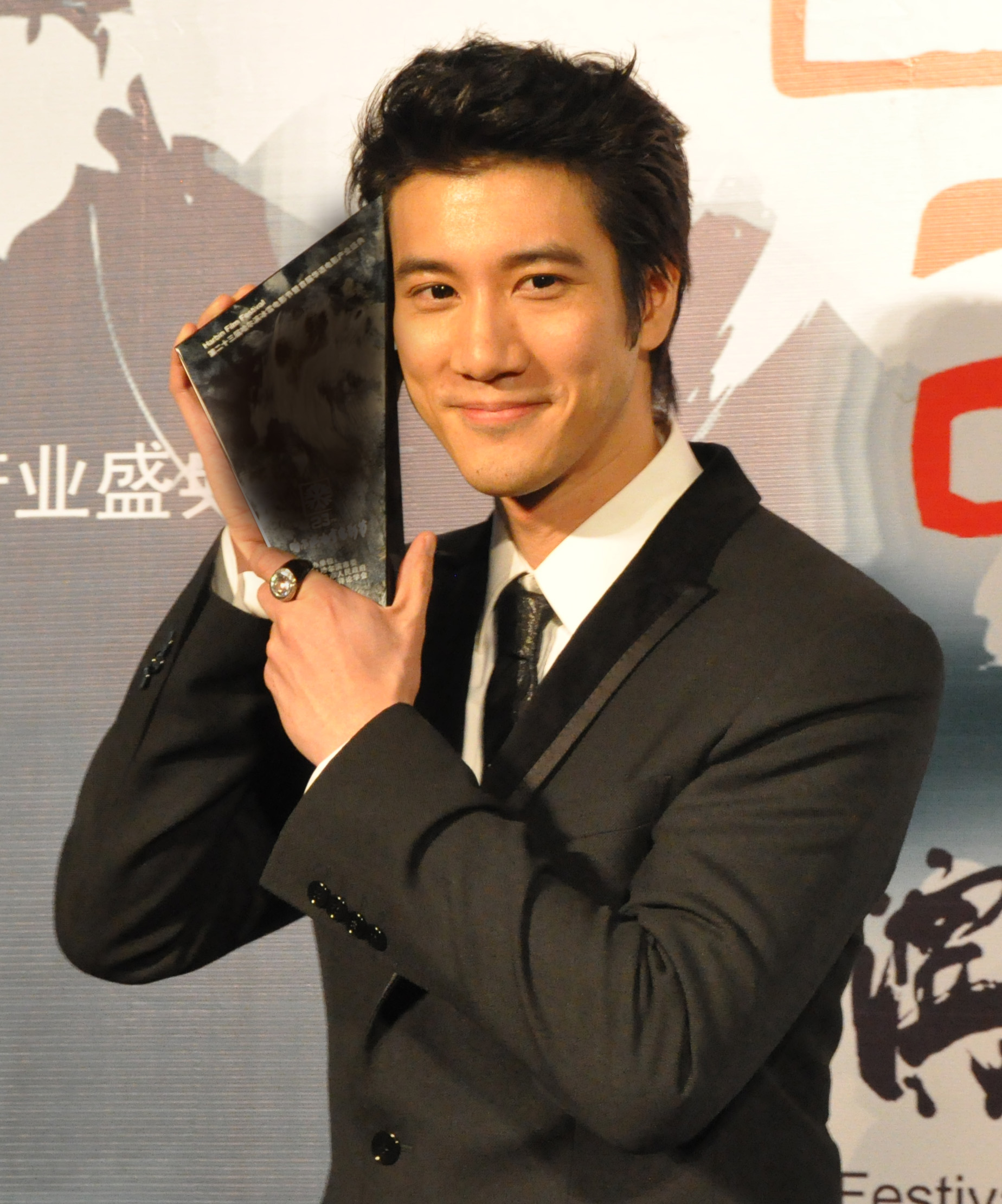
Chinese-American Mandopop singer, Wang Leehom.

Researchers have studied how Jay Chou's Western-style-Chinese-pop is a benchmark case study where a foreign artist successfully reproduces popular culture that preserves its Chineseness while concurrently embracing the West. This illustrates how a state-owned enterprise collaborated with a foreign group such as Jay's production team, and demonstrates how foreign cultural forms such as R&B are not unacceptable in China, and are even being encouraged and used insofar as they can help serve the state.

In response to what is officially deemed as "unstable attitudes of the two-party regime in Taiwan, the CCTV New Year's Gala annually includes some Taiwan Mandopop performances to "recall Taiwan peoples' Chinese identities. Since the 2000s, Zhongguo feng pop songs from Taiwan is observed to replace other types of Taiwanese popular songs in the Spring Gala. Influenced by this shift, popular Taiwanese Zhongguo feng singers Jay Chou and Leehom Wang with their songs "Blue and White Porcelain" (2008) and "The Twelve Zodiacs" (2013) are frequently invited to the Gala. Liu, An and Zhu posits how the 'Chineseness' in these songs portray a unified Chinese identity, as well as reinforce the same cultural root of Taiwan and mainland China and the 'One China' policy of the PRC government.

=== Use of Zhongguo feng songs in Chinese music curriculum ===
As most of Jay Chou's hit songs are Zhongguo feng songs, they are highly popular in the Chinese music curriculum, especially since they "break unwritten rules by combining tunes from different genres from both Chinese and Western paradigms and integrating them with Chinese ethnic nationalism". The singer is said to have a great impact on young Chinese people's sense of being Chinese with his extensive use of traditional Chinese cultural symbols, some of which were adapted from ancient Chinese poems and literary classics.

In 2010, Jay Chou's "Blue and White Porcelain" (青花瓷; qīnghuācí) was used in a monthly examination at a high school in Wuhan City, requiring students to complete a line taken from the song. Many people criticised the teacher who set the examination paper, suggesting that he might be a Jay Chou fan. The teacher denied this, explaining that the song was used because his students like listening to pop music and he wanted them to understand how classical Chinese music can be integrated into pop music.

== Criticisms or controversies ==
=== Accuracy of cultural content ===
Critics highlight the importance of having accurate cultural content in Zhongguo feng songs as this has important implications on society and cultural dissemination. For instance, a renowned collector pointed out the inaccurate portrayal of historical facts in Jay Chou's "Blue and White Porcelain". Researcher Chen expresses worry that inaccurate cultural content would lead to errors or misconceptions about Chinese culture, especially with Jay Chou's songs increasingly being selected as elementary school study materials or middle school exam questions.

=== Commercialisation ===
Another critique about Zhongguo feng popular music is its monotony and repetitive content as a result of commercialisation. As homogeneity, standardisation and duplication are typical characteristics of cultural products, Chen highlights how the popularity of Zhongguo feng music has led to a lot of mimicking by other artistes. As not all lyricists have the foundation for producing profound classical poetry and modern poetic songs, it has resulted in repetitive and stereotypical productions of Zhongguo feng music. In addition, many netizens have also accused other singers of plagiarising Jay Chou's "East Wind Breaks". The monotony and repetitive content would result in audience's weariness towards the arts as well as restrict Zhongguo feng music to a limited domain in spite of China's vast history and culture.

=== Political controversies ===
The only Zhongguo feng song involved in any significant controversy was "Chinese Language" (中国话; zhōngguó huà) by Taiwanese girl group, S.H.E. Their single was criticised for "being too pro-Beijing, with claims that the girls should not sing 'the whole world is learning Chinese language (zhongguo hua), but instead 'Taiwanese language' (taiwan hua)".

== See also ==
- Mandopop
- Cantopop
- Taiwanese pop
- Gangtai
- C-pop
- Music of China
- Music of Hong Kong
- Music of Taiwan
