= List of Chinese folk songs =

This is a list of Chinese folk songs, categorized by region.

In the 1990s, with the spread of music television in China, a new type of folk song began to emerge, known as new folk songs (新民歌) or TV program folk songs (晚会民歌). This type of music typically employs Chinese national vocal (minzu) vocals, with content focused on reflecting national history and culture or promoting the "main melody" — praising the Chinese Communist Party, the minzu, and the People's Liberation Army. Representative singers include Song Zuying, Peng Liyuan, Wang Hongwei.

== Hunan ==
- La Meizi

== Jiangsu ==
- "Mo Li Hua"
- "The Good Scenery of Suzhou" (苏州好风光)
- "Scenery of Wuxi" (无锡景)
- "Beautiful Lake Tai" (太湖美)
- "Lady Meng Jiang"
- "Yangtze River Boatmen"

== Northeastern China ==
- "Northeastern Cradle Song" (东北摇篮曲)

== Sichuan ==
- Kangding Love Song (康定情歌)

== Shaanxi ==
- Xin Tian You

- "Lan Huahua"

== Xinjiang ==
- Lift Your Veil (掀起你的蓋頭來)
