= Gufeng music =

Chinese music genre

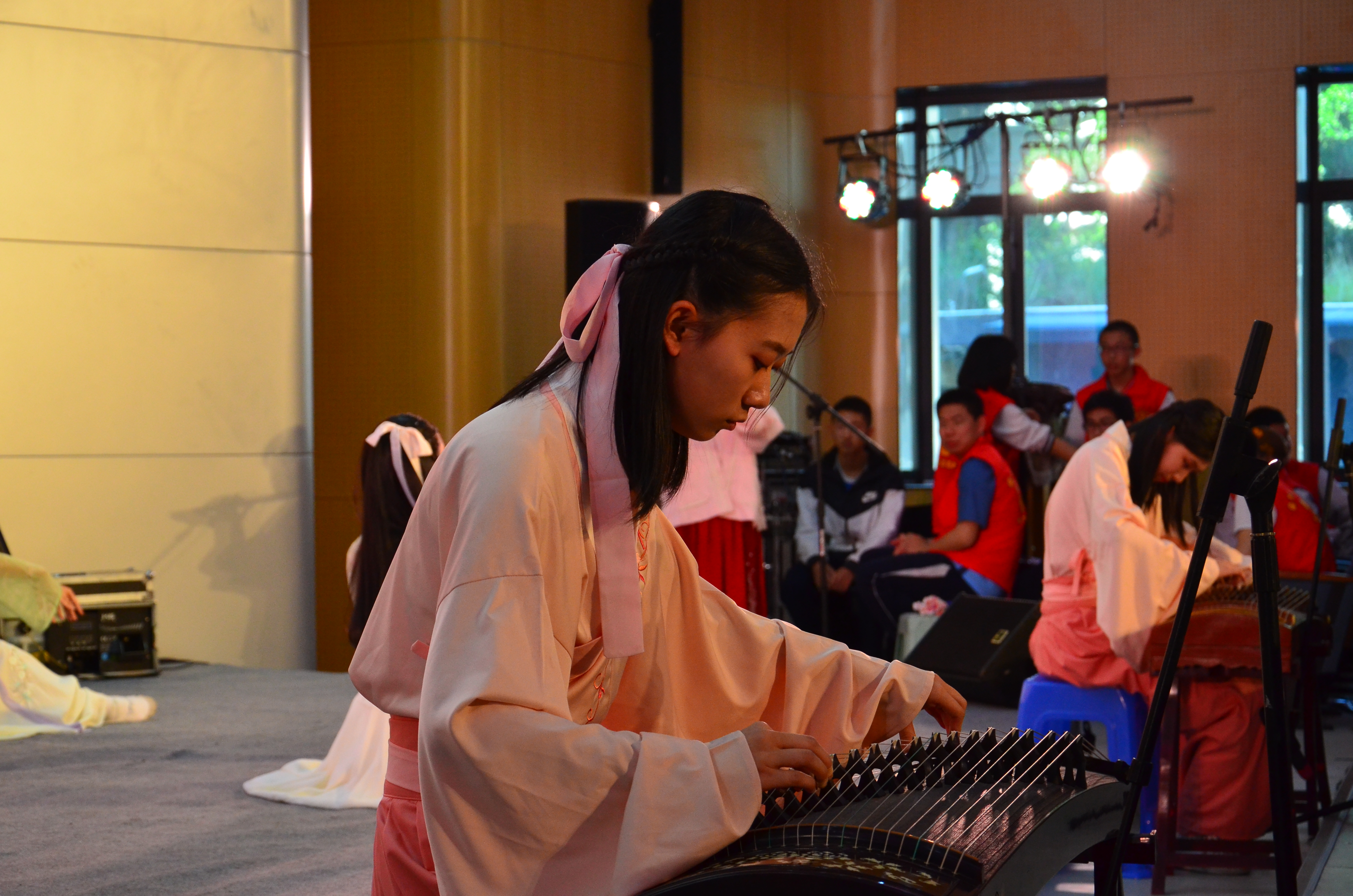
Students wearing Hanfu and playing Gufeng music

Gufeng music (traditional Chinese: 古風音樂; simplified Chinese: 古风音乐; pinyin: gǔfēng yīnyuè; Jyutping: gu2 fung1 jam1ngok6; lit. 'ancient-style music') is a genre of modern Chinese music originated from Mainland China, typically referring to modern musical compositions with heavy influences from traditional Chinese music (guoyue), narrative singing (tanci) and folk songs (min'ge), often accompanied by Chinese musical instruments. The lyrics of Gufeng music, if any at all, can be in Literary or Vernacular Chinese, and are often based on ancient mythological legends and poetic verses with frequent themes in classical romance, chivalrism, introspection and folklores. It is similar but different to Zhongguo feng (or simply guofeng) music, which are modern C-pop (typically Mandopop) songs with Chinese cultural elements and often also a strong emphasis on cultural pride.

The genre became prolific mostly during the early 21st century due to the rise of internet music in the Greater China region, and in recent years is often used as theme songs and soundtracks in xianxia, wuxia and historical fantasy works such as television drama, video games and animation, etc. It has also become popular among internet subcultures with nostalgia towards past golden ages of China, such as New Confucianism and the Hanfu movement.

== History ==
Gufeng music was usually called Xianxia music (仙侠; xianxia being a genre of Chinese fiction that is similar to wuxia, but with more mythological elements), and what now seems like a movement began rather quietly in 2005, calling for netizens to write lyrics with ancient-styled poems for the music in some popular PC games, including The Legend of Sword and Fairy and Xuan-Yuan Sword. The name seems to derive from the namesake lyricist column on Fenbei, and the basic concept of Chinoiserie music, a term which describes Western approximations of Chinese music.

== References and sources ==
References
