= Northeastern Cradle Song =

Northeast Chinese lullaby

Northeastern Cradle Song (Chinese: 东北摇篮曲) is a lullaby known widely in China, and is a folk song representative of Northeast China.

== General ==
The Northeastern Cradle Song is a lullaby known to many people in China. It is a folk song representative of Northeast China.

This cradle song is said to be originally sung in Pulandian, now part of Greater Dalian, at the time when Pulandian was called New Jin Prefecture (in Chinese: 新金县), located north of Jinzhou (in Chinese: 金州)).

== Lyrics ==
There are slight differences in the lyrics that people use. The following has been taken in Dalian, Liaoning Province, China.

Simplified Chinese	Traditional Chinese	English
东北摇篮曲 １． 月儿明，风儿静， 树叶遮窗棂。 小宝宝，快睡觉， 睡在那个梦中。 ２． 月儿那个明，风儿那个静， 摇篮轻摆动。 娘的宝宝，闭上眼睛， 睡呀睡在那个梦中。	東北搖籃曲 １． 月兒明，風兒靜， 樹葉遮窗欞。 小寶寶，快睡覺， 睡在那個夢中。 ２． 月兒那個明，風兒那個靜， 搖籃輕擺動。 娘的寶寶，閉上眼睛， 睡呀睡在那個夢中。	Northeastern Cradle Song 1. The moon is bright, the wind is quiet, The tree leaves hang over the window. My little baby, go to sleep quickly, Sleep, dreaming sweet dreams. 2. The moon is bright, the wind is quiet, The cradle moves softly. My little one, close your eyes, Sleep, sleep, dreaming sweet dreams.

== In popular culture ==
- In the film The Last Emperor, Ar Mo sang this lullaby twice, to her own baby and to Puyi.

== See also ==
- Lullaby
- Folk song
- Northeast China
- Tha Tha Thabungton
