= Tha Tha Thabungton =

Meitei language lullaby

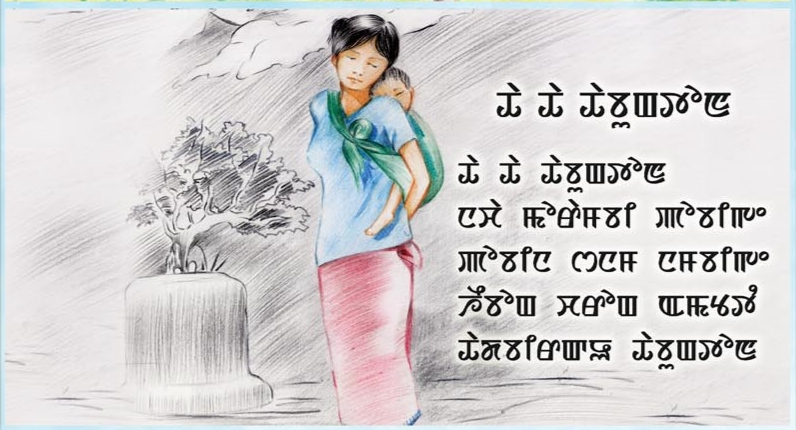
- An illustration of the Meitei language cradle song "Tha Tha Thabungton" in Meitei script

Song
- Language: Meitei language (officially called Manipuri language)
- English title: "Moon Moon Young Moon" or "Moon Moon Full Moon"

Tha Tha Thabungton (Meitei: Thaa Thaa Thaabungton; Old Manipuri: Thaa Thaa Thaapungton (Note: In this particular case, the only difference between the Modern Meitei (Modern Manipuri) and the Ancient Meitei (Old Manipuri) is the changing of "b" with "p".)) is a traditional Meitei language lullaby. It is one of the Meitei folk songs traditionally sung by parents, usually mothers. It has reference to the aspects of bringing up their child, besides their biological relationship with their child. It also has reference to the musical harmony with the care of the child, which may also influence on the child's life and health.

In Meitei society, mothers usually carry their children on their backs or shoulders and sing the "Tha Tha Thabungton" cradle song, giving reference to the Thaa (Meitei for 'moon')) and the Heibong (Meitei for 'ficus/fig fruit')).

== Etymology ==
According to the opinion of some writers, "thabungton" (Meitei: ꯊꯥꯕꯨꯡꯇꯣꯟ) is the shortened form of "tha mapung maton" (Meitei: ꯊꯥ ꯃꯄꯨꯡ ꯃꯇꯣꯟ) (morphologically, "moon-full-top", literally meaning "full moon").

== Lyrics ==
Lyrics in Meitei script	Lyrics in Eastern Nagari script (Note: Meitei language (officially called Manipuri language) is also written in Eastern Nagari script (Bengali-Assamese script), besides the Meitei script.)	Lyrics in Romanization	Lyrics in English translations (Translation by Mohendra Irengbam)	Lyrics in English translations (Translation by Oriental Institute of Cultural and Social Research)
ꯊꯥ ꯊꯥ ꯊꯥꯕꯨꯡꯇꯣꯟ ꯅꯆꯥ ꯃꯣꯔꯥꯝꯕꯤ ꯄꯣꯕꯤꯒꯦ ꯄꯣꯕꯤ ꯁꯅꯝ ꯅꯝꯕꯤꯒꯦ ꯍꯩꯕꯣꯡ ꯆꯔꯣꯡ ꯑꯃꯇꯪ ꯊꯥꯗꯕꯤꯔꯛꯎ ꯊꯥꯕꯨꯡꯇꯣꯟ ꯫	থা-থা থাবুংতোন, নচা মোরাম্বী পোবীগে পোবী শনম নম্বীগে হৈবোং চরোং অমত্তা থাদবিরকউ থাবুংতোন ।	Tha tha thabungton, nacha morambi pobige, pobi sanam nambige, heibong charong amatang thadabiraku thabungton.	Moon, moon, young moon, let me carry piggyback your morambi child. Please throw down a bunch of figs, youngmoon.	Oh Moon! Let me carry your darling child on my back. ...

The Meitei language term "Morambi" (Meitei: ꯃꯣꯔꯥꯝꯕꯤ) is translated as "darling child" in the publication of the "Oriental Institute of Cultural and Social Research". On the other hand, the same term "Morambi" (Meitei: ꯃꯣꯔꯥꯝꯕꯤ) is defined as "a figure of baby, usu made of cloth" in a publication of the University of Chicago.

== In popular culture ==
- The lullaby "Tha, Tha Thabungton" (Meitei: ꯊꯥ ꯊꯥ ꯊꯥꯕꯨꯡꯇꯣꯟ) was featured in the 1972 Meitei language feature film Matamgi Manipur (Meitei: ꯃꯇꯝꯒꯤ ꯃꯅꯤꯄꯨꯔ).
- The lullaby "Tha Tha Thabungton..." (Meitei: ꯊꯥ ꯊꯥ ꯊꯥꯕꯨꯡꯇꯣꯟ) was featured in a theatrical production named "Heyang Athouba" as a part of the "Rhythm of Manipur's 3rd Opera Production" organized at the JN Manipur Dance Akademi, Imphal on 28 July 2013.

== Similar lullabies ==
- Der Mond ist aufgegangen - a German language lullaby
- Northeastern Cradle Song - a Chinese language lullaby

== See also ==
- Lairembigee Eshei
- Shakuhachi meets Pena
- Nura Pakhang (Eu e Tu)
