= List of participants at Expo 2010 =

At Expo 2010, which was celebrated in Shanghai from 1 May to 31 October 2010 were present 242 participants: 192 nations and 50 international organizations. This represents the largest participation at any expo.

== Participants ==
=== Nations ===
192 nations registered for the Expo (three countries that had already confirmed its participation needed to withdraw because of internal problems: Burkina Faso, Bhutan and Kuwait). These are 186 independent countries, recognized by the UN (the home country, Mainland China, included); two non UN-recognized nations: Taiwan and Palestine; two associated states of New Zealand: Cook Islands and Niue, and the two Mainland China SARs: Hong Kong and Macau.

The next table shows, by confirmation date, the nations that have notified the Government of the People's Republic of China its participation at the Expo; the fourth column indicates if the state had constructed its own individual pavilion; the last column indicates the section which the pavilion was located within the Expo site.

Nr.	Nation	Confirmation date	Non-joint pavilion	National Day	Section
1	France	10 March 2006		21 June 2010	C9
2	Ukraine	13 March 2006		24 August 2010	C10
3	Bahrain	17 March 2006		22 October 2010	A3
4	Mali	27 March 2006		31 May 2010	C4
5	Cambodia	30 March 2006		28 June 2010	B3
6	Canada	3 April 2006		1 July 2010	C7
7	Mauritania	4 April 2006		19 July 2010	C4
8	Algeria	10 April 2006		31 July 2010	C5
9	Republic of the Congo	10 April 2006		16 June 2010	C4
10	Hungary	10 April 2006		22 August 2010	C11
11	Switzerland	11 April 2006		12 August 2010	C9
12	New Zealand	12 April 2006		9 July 2010	B3
13	Central African Republic	13 April 2006		25 September 2010	C4
14	Cuba	14 April 2006		26 July 2010	C8
15	Zambia	25 April 2006		24 October 2010	C4
16	Turkmenistan	26 April 2006		20 May 2010	A3
17	Tajikistan	27 April 2006		22 September 2010	A10
18	Lesotho	4 May 2006		4 October 2010	C4
19	Uzbekistan	6 May 2006		31 August 2010	A10
20	Eritrea	8 May 2006		25 May 2010	C4
21	Monaco	11 May 2006		7 October 2010	C9
22	Seychelles	15 May 2006		18 June 2010	C4
23	Burundi	16 May 2006		3 July 2010	C4
24	Armenia	17 May 2006		21 September 2010	C11
25	Togo	17 May 2006		20 August 2010	C4
26	Comoros	25 May 2006		6 July 2010	C4
27	Netherlands	30 May 2006		18 May 2010	C6
28	Singapore	2 June 2006		7 August 2010	B3
29	Sri Lanka	5 June 2006		18 July 2010	A3
30	Equatorial Guinea	6 June 2006		15 August 2010	C4
31	Pakistan	9 June 2006		14 August 2010	A3
32	Cape Verde	12 June 2006		10 July 2010	C4
33	Nepal	12 June 2006		3 September 2010	A2
34	Spain	13 June 2006		30 August 2010	C9
35	Vanuatu	14 June 2006		8 October 2010	B2
36	Egypt	15 June 2006		23 July 2010	C5
37	Guinea	15 June 2006		2 October 2010	C4
38	Kyrgyzstan	15 June 2006		4 August 2010	A10
39	Mongolia	15 June 2006		13 September 2010	A10
40	Vietnam	15 June 2006		2 September 2010	A9
41	Myanmar	19 June 2006		1 June 2010	A9
42	Benin	20 June 2006		6 October 2010	C4
43	Samoa	22 June 2006		1 June 2010	B2
44	Kazakhstan	26 June 2006		5 June 2010	A10
45	Nigeria	26 June 2006		21 August 2010	C5
46	Australia	29 June 2006		8 June 2010	B3
47	Djibouti	3 July 2006		30 June 2010	C4
48	Italy	3 July 2006		2 June 2010	C6
49	Papua New Guinea	4 July 2006		17 September 2010	B2
50	Germany	7 July 2006		19 May 2010	C9
51	Albania	11 July 2006		5 May 2010	C11
52	Dominica	11 July 2006		17 July 2010	C7
53	Ivory Coast	12 July 2006		8 August 2010	C4
54	Angola	14 July 2006		26 September 2010	C5
55	Turkey	14 July 2006		20 June 2010	C10
56	Philippines	17 July 2006		9 June 2010	B3
57	Bolivia	24 July 2006		13 August 2010	C8
58	Luxembourg	3 August 2006		10 October 2010	C6
59	Tanzania	4 August 2006		7 July 2010	C4
60	Croatia	7 August 2006		15 May 2010	C7
61	Palau	7 August 2006		23 October 2010	B2
62	Senegal	7 August 2006		24 July 2010	C4
63	United Kingdom	9 August 2006		8 September 2010	C6
64	Bulgaria	11 August 2006		14 June 2010	C11
65	Poland	14 August 2006		22 May 2010	C9
66	Belgium	25 August 2006		13 June 2010	C9
67	Zimbabwe	25 August 2006		10 August 2010	C4
68	Namibia	31 August 2006		26 August 2010	C4
69	Laos	6 September 2006		12 October 2010	A9
70	Rwanda	12 September 2006		4 July 2010	C4
71	Tonga	28 September 2006		1 August 2010	B2
72	Montenegro	3 October 2006		24 May 2010	C11
73	Yemen	4 October 2006		14 October 2010	A3
74	Sudan	11 October 2006		11 July 2010	C4
75	Trinidad and Tobago	11 October 2006		17 July 2010	C7
76	Lithuania	12 October 2006		15 July 2010	C7
77	Kenya	17 October 2006		9 September 2010	C4
78	Morocco	17 October 2006		30 September 2010	A3
79	Federated States of Micronesia	17 October 2006		29 August 2010	B2
80	Costa Rica	20 October 2006		29 October 2010	C8
81	Japan	20 October 2006		12 June 2010	A9
82	Gabon	30 October 2006		30 July 2010	C4
83	Saudi Arabia	4 November 2006		23 September 2010	A2
84	Palestine	6 November 2006		16 October 2010	A3
85	Moldova	14 November 2006		27 August 2010	C11
86	Cameroon	21 November 2006		3 October 2010	C4
87	India	51.11.2006		15 August 2010	A2
88	Belarus	5 December 2006		11 October 2010	C11
89	Guatemala	5 December 2006		15 September 2010	C8
90	Indonesia	7 December 2006		17 August 2010	B3
91	Malaysia	11 December 2006		12 September 2010	B3
92	Portugal	12 December 2006		6 June 2010	C11
93	South Korea	20 December 2006		26 May 2010	A9
94	Russia	20 December 2006		28 September 2010	C7
95	Serbia	3 January 2007		27 June 2010	C9
96	Tunisia	3 January 2007		19 September 2010	C5
97	Greece	15 January 2007		19 June 2010	C10
98	Czech Republic	24 January 2007		17 May 2010	C11
99	Uruguay	24 January 2007		25 August 2010	C8
100	Sierra Leone	25 January 2007		7 May 2010	C4
101	Finland	26 January 2007		27 May 2010	C10
102	Azerbaijan	30 January 2007		15 October 2010	C11
103	Macedonia	12 February 2007		7 September 2010	C11
104	Romania	23 February 2007		29 July 2010	C7
105	Ireland	26 February 2007		17 June 2010	C10
106	Brunei	7 March 2007		8 May 2010	B3
107	Democratic Republic of the Congo	12 March 2007		23 June 2010	C4
108	Madagascar	15 March 2007		30 May 2010	C4
109	Argentina	16 March 2007		10 June 2010	C5
110	Cyprus	20 March 2007		28 August 2010	C11
111	Lebanon	26 March 2007		22 June 2010	A10
112	Peru	30 March 2007		28 July 2010	C8
113	Chile	3 April 2007		18 September 2010	C8
114	Uganda	13 April 2007		9 October 2010	C4
115	Georgia	17 April 2007		28 October 2010	C11
–	Bhutan	18 April 2007			
116	Thailand	24 April 2007		5 September 2010	B3
117	Guyana	25 April 2007		17 July 2010	C7
118	Ethiopia	26 April 2007		10 September 2010	C4
119	Austria	3 May 2007		21 May 2010	C7
120	Fiji	7 May 2007		6 August 2010	B2
121	Mauritius	9 May 2007		29 May 2010	C4
122	Mozambique	16 May 2007		25 June 2010	C4
123	Niger	22 May 2007		3 August 2010	C4
124	Haiti	23 May 2007		17 July 2010	C7
125	Iraq	27 May 2007			A9
126	Jamaica	31 May 2007		17 July 2010	C7
127	Guinea-Bissau	5 June 2007		24 September 2010	C4
128	Liberia	8 June 2007		23 August 2010	C4
129	Denmark	11 June 2007		29 June 2010	C10
130	Oman	12 June 2007		22 July 2010	A3
131	Sweden	14 June 2007		23 May 2010	C10
132	Chad	14 June 2007		11 August 2010	C4
133	Cook Islands	18 June 2007		5 August 2010	B2
134	San Marino	18 June 2007		4 June 2010	C11
135	Somalia	26 June 2007		26 June 2010	C4
136	Iran	4 July 2007		11 June 2010	A10
137	Maldives	8 July 2007		15 June 2010	A10
138	Ghana	10 July 2007		8 July 2010	C4
139	Suriname	26 July 2007		17 July 2010	C7
140	Ecuador	3 August 2007		14 August 2010	C8
141	Afghanistan	5 August 2007		19 August 2010	A3
142	Bangladesh	14 August 2007		20 September 2010	A10
143	Norway	16 August 2007		28 May 2010	C10
144	Venezuela	17 August 2007		5 July 2010	C8
145	United Arab Emirates	26 August 2007		27 September 2010	A3
146	Syria	31 August 2007		17 October 2010	A3
147	North Korea	10 September 2007		6 September 2010	A10
148	Mexico	21 September 2007		16 September 2010	C8
149	Grenada	24 September 2007		17 July 2010	C7
150	Botswana	25 September 2007		21 July 2010	C4
151	Jordan	26 September 2007		25 July 2010	A3
152	Slovakia	27 September 2007		4 September 2010	C11
153	Niue	12 October 2007		19 October 2010	B2
154	Bosnia and Herzegovina	18 October 2007		9 May 2010	C11
155	Nicaragua	23 October 2007		14 September 2010	C8
156	Estonia	1 November 2007		18 October 2010	C10
157	South Africa	2 November 2007		9 August 2010	C5
158	Libya	11 November 2007		29 September 2010	C5
159	Kiribati	15 November 2007		12 July 2010	B2
160	Solomon Islands	15 November 2007		27 July 2010	B2
161	Tuvalu	20 November 2007		13 October 2010	B2
162	Israel	3 December 2007		6 May 2010	A3
163	Brazil	11 December 2007		3 June 2010	C8
164	Malta	16 January 2008		14 May 2010	C11
165	Iceland	23 January 2008		11 September 2010	C10
166	Marshall Islands	13 February 2008		17 August 2010	B2
167	Qatar	14 March 2008		20 October 2010	A3
168	Malawi	1 April 2008		14 July 2010	C4
169	Antigua and Barbuda	3 April 2008		17 July 2010	C7
170	El Salvador	24 April 2008		20 July 2010	C8
171	Slovenia	17 June 2008		24 June 2010	C5
172	Dominican Republic	4 July 2008		5 October 2010	C8
173	Barbados	22 July 2008		17 July 2010	C7
–	Burkina Faso	28 July 2008			
–	Kuwait	8 August 2008			
174	Timor-Leste	26 September 2008		13 July 2010	A10
175	Latvia	29 September 2008		21 October 2010	C10
176	Bahamas	8 October 2008		17 July 2010	C7
177	Panama	23 October 2008		16 August 2010	C8
178	Paraguay	3 November 2008			C8
179	Liechtenstein	13 November 2008		1 September 2010	C11
180	Honduras	23 December 2008		27 October 2010	C8
181	Nauru	7 January 2009		26 October 2010	B2
182	Belize	23 March 2009		17 July 2010	C7
183	Saint Lucia	17 April 2009		17 July 2010	C7
184	Saint Vincent and the Grenadines	27 April 2009		17 July 2010	C7
185	Saint Kitts and Nevis	28 April 2009		17 July 2010	C7
186	Colombia	8 May 2009		16 July 2010	C8
187	Gambia	23 May 2009		15 June 2010	C4
188	United States	15 June 2009		4 July 2010	C8
189	China	–		1 October 2010	A0
190	Hong Kong	–			A0
191	Macau	–			A0
192	Taiwan	–		10 October 2010	A2

=== Organizations ===
50 organizations in total participated at the Expo: 40 international organizations and 10 non-governmental organizations.

Nr.	International Organization	Confirmation date	Own pav.	Honour Day	Section
01	Convention on Biological Diversity	7 April 2006		24 October 2010	B2
02	CIS	14 April 2006			
03	WTO	18 May 2006		24 October 2010	B2
04	World Water Council	2 June 2006			B3
05	UNIDO	13 June 2006		24 October 2010	B2
06	UN Framework Convention on Climate Change	7 July 2006		24 October 2010	B2
07	World Bank	19 July 2006		24 October 2010	B2
08	United Nations	28 July 2006		24 October 2010	B2
09	League of Arab States	15 September 2006			B3
10	IFRC	29 September 2006		8 May 2010	B2
11	OCDE	13 October 2006			B3
12	African Union	10 December 2006		3 June 2010	C4
13	WMO	14 December 2006		9 May 2010	B2
14	UN-HABITAT	2 January 2007		24 October 2010	B2
15	South Pacific Tourism Organization	31 January 2007		21 May 2010	B2
16	UNESCO	16 February 2007		24 October 2010	B2
17	Pacific Islands Forum	31 May 2007			B2
18	World Trade Centers Association	4 June 2007		9 June 2010	B2
19	Boao Forum for Asia	12 September 2007		22 May 2010	B3
20	CARICOM	17 September 2007		17 July 2010	C7
21	Caribbean Development Bank	11 October 2007			C7
22	United Nations High Commissioner for Refugees	30 October 2007		24 October 2010	B2
23	UNICEF	6 November 2007		24 October 2010	B2
24	FAO	8 November 2007		24 October 2010	B2
25	OIEA	8 November 2007		24 October 2010	B2
26	IMO	8 November 2007		24 October 2010	B2
27	Joint United Nations Programme on HIV/AIDS	8 November 2007		24 October 2010	B2
28	United Nations Capital Development Fund	8 November 2007		24 October 2010	B2
29	UNEP	8 November 2007		24 October 2010	B2
30	WIPO	8 November 2007		24 October 2010	B2
31	United Nations Population Fund	9 November 2007		24 October 2010	B2
32	WWF	12 November 2007		5 June 2010	B3
33	CAMESA	5 December 2007			B3
34	ITU	13 December 2007		17 May 2010	B2
35	International Development Information Network Association-DEVNET	12 January 2008		8 September 2010	B2
36	Forum Francophone des Affaires	4 February 2008		18 June 2010	B3
37	Global Environment Facility	5 February 2008			B3
38	WHO	13 March 2008		24 October 2010	B2
39	UNCTAD	7 April 2008		24 October 2010	B2
40	IEA	9 April 2008		24 October 2010	B2
41	ASEAN	16 June 2008			B3
42	EUMETSAT	11 June 2008		24 October 2010	B2
43	United Cities and Local Governments	19 June 2008			B3
44	Group on Earth Observations	30 June 2008			
45	IAPT	17 October 2008		28 August 2010	B3
46	European Union	4 February 2009			C9
47	ICM	17 March 2009		18 May 2010	B3
48	International Network for Bamboo and Rattan	4 May 2009		20 May 2010	B3
49	WTO	30 July 2009		24 October 2010	B2
50	Shanghai Cooperation Organisation	23 September 2009			B3
