= Tenawa =

Parrot in Meitei mythology

Tenawa (Meitei: ꯇꯦꯅꯋꯥ)
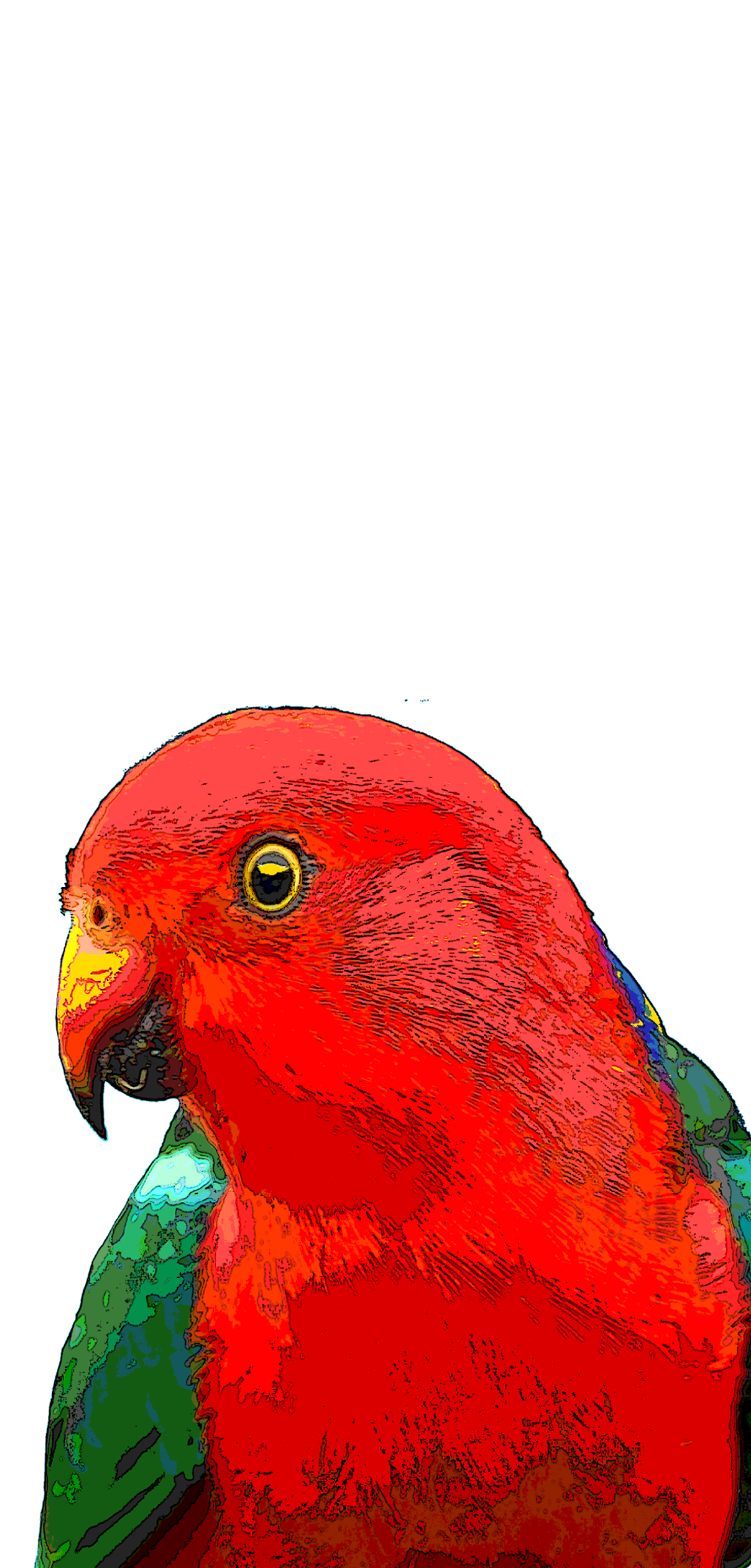
- A Tenawa (transl. the parrot)

Creature information
- Other name(s): Tenouwa, Tenauwa
- Grouping: Animal
- Sub grouping: Parrot
- Similar entities: Pebet, Khambrangchak, Kakyen
- Folklore: Meitei folklore

Origin
- Country: India
- Region: Manipur

Tenawa (transl. the parrot), sometimes spelled as Tenouwa, appears frequently in Meitei mythology and Meitei folktales of the Meitei folklore of Ancient Kangleipak (early Manipur).

== Story of Sanagi Tenawa ==
In the Meitei folktale of "Sanagi Tenawa" (transl. The Golden Parrot), in a rocky land, there existed a divine golden parrot whose magical influence made all the trees capable of talking and moving like animals. The parrot's fame spread across distant lands.

=== Prince's journey to find the parrot ===
In a faraway kingdom, a courageous and wise prince heard tales of this parrot and decided to bring it to his realm. One night, he set off with his friend, the minister's son, without informing anyone, fearing the king would forbid such a perilous journey. For three full moons, they traveled tirelessly until they reached the rocky land, marveling at the animated trees and rocks. While exploring, they discovered a cave entrance and believed the parrot was inside. They dismounted and secured their horses to nearby trees.

=== Meeting with a tree monster ===
As the prince led the way into the cave, a booming voice halted him. "Stop, prince, I know you seek the parrot," it declared. They turned to see a tree monster guarding the entrance. "You must answer my three questions to proceed. Fail, and you will turn to stone like these princes, or you may return home empty-handed," the monster warned. "We seek the golden parrot and will not leave without it. Ask your questions," the prince replied. The monster's first question was, "Who is the happiest person alive?" The prince answered, "One who owes no debt and is healthy and free from illness." The second question followed, "What are the essential qualities of a king?" "A king should act according to the people's wishes, care for the poor and destitute, and treat everyone equally," the prince responded. Satisfied, the monster asked the final question, "Who are the gods one can see with their own eyes?" "One's birth parents are the gods visible to them," the prince answered. Impressed by the prince's wisdom, the monster said, "You may enter the cave. I have awaited someone who could answer my questions. Now, I must leave." With that, the monster vanished.

=== Finding the parrot ===
Inside the cave, they found the golden parrot perched on a golden plate. "I have been imprisoned by the tree monster. I am glad to see you," the parrot said. "We have come to take you to the palace. But first, how can we restore the princes turned to stone?" the prince asked. "Sprinkle water from that golden pond on them," the parrot instructed. The prince fetched water from the pond and sprinkled it over the stones, reviving the princes. They thanked the prince and returned to their kingdoms. The prince and his friend, with the parrot, returned to their horses. As the parrot left the land, the once lively trees and bushes became still again. Back at the palace, the parrot was placed on a golden throne. The kingdom's trees and vegetation came to life, singing and dancing in honor of the parrot and the prince. And everyone in the kingdom lived happily ever after.

== Story of Mee na Tenawa Onba ==
In the Meitei folktale of "Mee na Tenawa Onba" (transl. Human Turning into Parrot), Yukokthong Yaimaba, the grandson of the Koubru King, wasn't interested in traditional duties like farming. Instead, he decided to pursue a career in business. During his travels, he arrived at Kabo Valley and stayed with a woman named Haoningsang Poudongnu.

=== Fatherless life of the maiden ===
Over time, Poudongnu gave birth to a daughter. Her father had left before she was born and never returned. As the years passed, Poudongnu's daughter, named Songri, grew into a beautiful young woman, but her father remained absent. Poudongnu raised Songri by begging from house to house to meet their basic needs. When Songri became an adult, she took over the responsibilities of farming and chopping wood, allowing her mother to stop begging. Their farmland was exceptionally fertile, and the sight of their lush paddy fields was admired by everyone. However, the beauty of the fields attracted many birds, which began to damage the crops.

=== Relationship with her father ===
One day, while Songri was tending to the fields, her father, Yukokthong, who had been away for 14 years, happened to pass by. He was captivated by the sight of the young woman in the fields and went to rest at a nearby place. The father and daughter could not recognize each other. They gave their hearts to each other. Later, they departed promising to meet each other again. When Songri returned home, she saw the same man smoking traditional tobacco and asked her mother about him. Her mother revealed that he was her father, who had been away seeking fortune. Terrified of the truth, Songri declared that she would end her life by jumping into the Ningthi River. Her mother, unaware of her daughter's resolve, continued with her chores.

=== Missing of the maiden ===
After feeding her husband, Poudongnu noticed that Songri was still missing. She searched for her daughter all night, asking friends and neighbors, but to no avail. In a dream, Songri appeared to her mother, saying she had transformed into a small fish and could be brought back to life if caught and wrapped in six layers of cloth. Poudongnu followed her daughter's instructions, went to the river, and began catching fish. She released each one, looking for her daughter. Eventually, she returned home in sorrow. In another dream, Songri revealed that she was among the stones Poudongnu had thrown back into the river. Poudongnu rushed to the spot, found her daughter, and wrapped her in warm clothes as instructed.

=== Transformation into a Tenawa ===
Curious, Poudongnu opened the bundle before the specified time and found her daughter transformed into a Tenawa (transl. the parrot). Songri explained that they could no longer be together and that she had to fly to the mountains. Accepting their fate, Poudongnu let her daughter go, and Songri flew away, singing "te te", which is the sound produced by a Tenawa (transl. the parrot).

== Story of Sanagi Saji amadi Sanagi Tenawa ==
In the Meitei folktale of "Sanagi Saji amadi Sanagi Tenawa" (transl. The golden Deer and the golden Parrot), in a grand palace, a Prince and the Minister's son shared a deep bond of friendship. When the time came for their education, they set off together. As they walked, they reached a fork in the road. "Let's part ways here and meet again at this spot after a year," they agreed, and each went their separate way.

=== The magical performances ===
A year later, they reunited at the same place. On their journey back through the forest, the Minister's son suggested, "Let's show each other what we've learned." He lay on the ground, chanted over his palms, and rubbed his face. A golden deer emerged from his mouth, played around, and then returned inside. The Prince then demonstrated his skill. He lay down, chanted, and a golden parrot flew out of his mouth, perching on a branch. The Minister's son, consumed by greed, thought, "If I turn into a golden deer and enter his body, I can become the Prince and eventually the King." He transformed into a deer and entered the Prince's mouth. Taking over the Prince's body, he dismembered and burned his own body.

=== Trap of the prince as a parrot ===
The golden parrot, witnessing this, lamented, "You destroyed yourself out of jealousy. Now I must live as a wild bird." With tears, it flew away. The Minister's son, now in the Prince's form, returned to the palace. When asked about his friend, he replied, "We parted ways." He lived as the Prince and, after the old King's death, became the new King. Meanwhile, the real Prince, now a golden parrot, wandered until he flew into another palace. He perched near a Princess weaving cloth. She fell in love with the beautiful bird. The parrot visited her daily, and one day she confessed her love. "If you want to keep me, promise never to sell or give me away," the parrot said. She agreed, and he allowed her to cage him. People came from afar to see the golden parrot. The Minister's son heard of the parrot and suspected it was the real Prince. He wrote to the King, offering to buy the bird. The Princess refused, and the Minister's son threatened war if they didn't comply.

=== The parrot prince in danger ===
The elderly King, father of the Princess who cared for the Parrot, was too frail to engage in battle. To protect her father's life, the Princess broke her promise to the Parrot and handed it over to the Minister's son. The Minister's son took the Parrot to the palace, planning to execute it publicly as a grand spectacle. When the time arrived, a large crowd gathered in the palace courtyard. The Parrot was paraded around the palace by the King, his Ministers, and servants before its scheduled execution. As the King strolled, the Parrot wept. Leima, the Minister's son's wife and former wife of the Prince, saw the golden Parrot crying and began to cry as well. The Parrot spoke to Leima, saying, "Dear Leima, I am your true husband, the real Prince. After completing our education, the Minister's son and I demonstrated our magical abilities in the forest. While I transformed into a golden Parrot, the greedy Minister's son turned into a golden Deer and entered my body, taking my place as the Prince. He is not the real Prince." Leima and the Parrot then devised a plan.

=== Escape from the trap ===
Upon the King's return to the palace, Leima, as planned with the Parrot, addressed the King in front of the crowd, "Mighty King, you studied magical powers for a year. Show us what you learned." The King hesitated but eventually agreed. A clean sheet was laid on the ground, and the King lay on it, chanting and rubbing his palms on his face. A golden Deer emerged from the King's mouth, delighting the crowd with its beauty. Seizing the moment, Leima opened the golden cage, and the Parrot flew into the King's body. The golden Deer, unable to re-enter the body, fled into the forest. The true Prince revealed his identity to the crowd and ruled the kingdom happily ever after.

== In Meitei rhymes ==
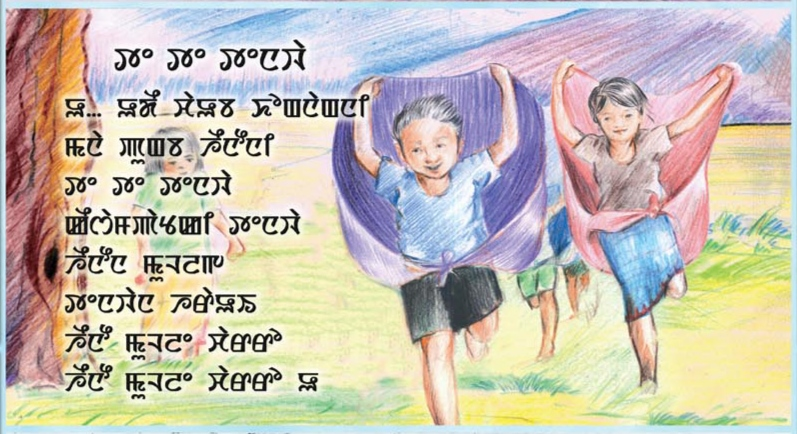
Lyrics of "Te Te Tenawaa" (transl. Te Te Parrot), a traditional Meitei children's song of Kangleipak

Tenawa (Meitei: ꯇꯦꯅꯋꯥ) is notably mentioned in a Meitei language rhyme song for the children, usually sung during the playing of a traditional Meitei game called "Uraobi" (transl. shouting of uuuu...), or "Uraobi Tanaba".

| Lines | Meitei language passage | English translation | Significance | Notes |
|---|---|---|---|---|
| Line 1 | Uuuu... (Meitei: ꯎꯎꯎꯎ...) | Oooo... | Tenawa, a type of domestic bird, was trained to communicate and served as an alarm for the Meitei people. This practice emerged when dog rearing was discontinued during the conversion to Hinduism by the kings of Manipur. Despite changes in its role and usage, the oral tradition continues to thrive within the community. | |
| Line 2 | Udagi Chaoba Khongnangni (Meitei: ꯎꯗꯒꯤ ꯆꯥꯎꯕ ꯈꯣꯡꯅꯥꯡꯅꯤ) | Banyan is the bigger tree | Tenawa, a type of domestic bird, was trained to communicate and served as an alarm for the Meitei people. This practice emerged when dog rearing was discontinued during the conversion to Hinduism by the kings of Manipur. Despite changes in its role and usage, the oral tradition continues to thrive within the community. | |
| Line 3 | Mana Pungba Heinouni (Meitei: ꯃꯅꯥ ꯄꯨꯡꯕ ꯍꯩꯅꯧꯅꯤ) | It's a leafy mango tree | Tenawa, a type of domestic bird, was trained to communicate and served as an alarm for the Meitei people. This practice emerged when dog rearing was discontinued during the conversion to Hinduism by the kings of Manipur. Despite changes in its role and usage, the oral tradition continues to thrive within the community. | |
| Line 4 | Heinouna Mullaga (Meitei: ꯍꯩꯅꯧꯅ ꯃꯨꯜꯂꯒ) | When the mango is ripe | Tenawa, a type of domestic bird, was trained to communicate and served as an alarm for the Meitei people. This practice emerged when dog rearing was discontinued during the conversion to Hinduism by the kings of Manipur. Despite changes in its role and usage, the oral tradition continues to thrive within the community. | |
| Line 5 | Tenawana haraowi (Meitei: ꯇꯦꯅꯋꯥꯅ ꯍꯔꯥꯎꯋꯤ) | Parrot feels delighted | Tenawa, a type of domestic bird, was trained to communicate and served as an alarm for the Meitei people. This practice emerged when dog rearing was discontinued during the conversion to Hinduism by the kings of Manipur. Despite changes in its role and usage, the oral tradition continues to thrive within the community. | |
| Line 6 | Te te Tenawa (Meitei: ꯇꯦ ꯇꯦ ꯇꯦꯅꯋꯥ) | Te Te the Parrot | Tenawa, a type of domestic bird, was trained to communicate and served as an alarm for the Meitei people. This practice emerged when dog rearing was discontinued during the conversion to Hinduism by the kings of Manipur. Despite changes in its role and usage, the oral tradition continues to thrive within the community. | |
| Line 7 | Keishampat ki Tenawa (Meitei: ꯀꯩꯁꯥꯝꯄꯥꯠ ꯀꯤ ꯇꯦꯅꯋꯥ) | Parrot of Keishampat | Tenawa, a type of domestic bird, was trained to communicate and served as an alarm for the Meitei people. This practice emerged when dog rearing was discontinued during the conversion to Hinduism by the kings of Manipur. Despite changes in its role and usage, the oral tradition continues to thrive within the community. | |

== See also ==
- List of Meitei folktales
