= Wang Hesheng (composer) =

Chinese composer

Wang Hesheng (Chinese: 王和声; pinyin: Wáng Héshēng; born Luoyang, 27 December 1955) is a composer of the Military Band of the People's Liberation Army of China, also a member of Chinese Musicians Association. In 1985, he studied composition from Professor Mu Hong in the central Conservatory of Music. He became a professional composer of the Military Band of the People's Liberation Army of China after graduation in 1988.

Over the last ten years, Wang has created more than 600 instrumental music and vocal music, with wide range of materials and different styles. The latter include solo, ensemble, symphony for symphonic band, and symphonic chorus. He has attached great importance to national characteristic, popularity and sense of the times in his creation. Twenty pieces of his works have been awarded the prize in the country and the army. And a lot of compositions have been published and recorded on the discs and the tapes.

Wang's major works are: Yuanmingyuan – a symphonic tone poem for symphonic band, Beautiful Evening of Prairie, Dance under the moonlight (a trumpet solo), Yihai – a symphonic tone-poem for symphonic band, and Plum Blossom (咏梅) a symphonic chorus etc.

He co-created the admission music (金声玉振 jīn shēng yù zhèn) for the award ceremony of the 2008 Beijing Olympic Games with Tan Dun.

== Selected works ==
- Plum Blossom：咏梅 (为毛主席诗词谱曲)
- Ah, bottom of the waves 啊！小浪底
- Return of the trumpet 回归号角 (instrumental)
- The footsteps of youth: 青春的脚步
- The sacred fire of my heart: 心中的圣火
- Dance of the golden snake：金蛇狂舞(板胡领奏)
- Ode for the national flag: 国旗颂
- Might of the Sea: 大海神威
- I love you, China: 我爱你中国
- The people and army are devoted to the Party: 人民军队忠于党
- Ode for mother: 母亲颂
- Dance steps under moonlight：月光下的舞步(小号独奏)
- Eternal Jinggang Mountains: 永远的井冈
