= Lara Veronin =

Taiwanese musician

Lara Veronin 梁心頤
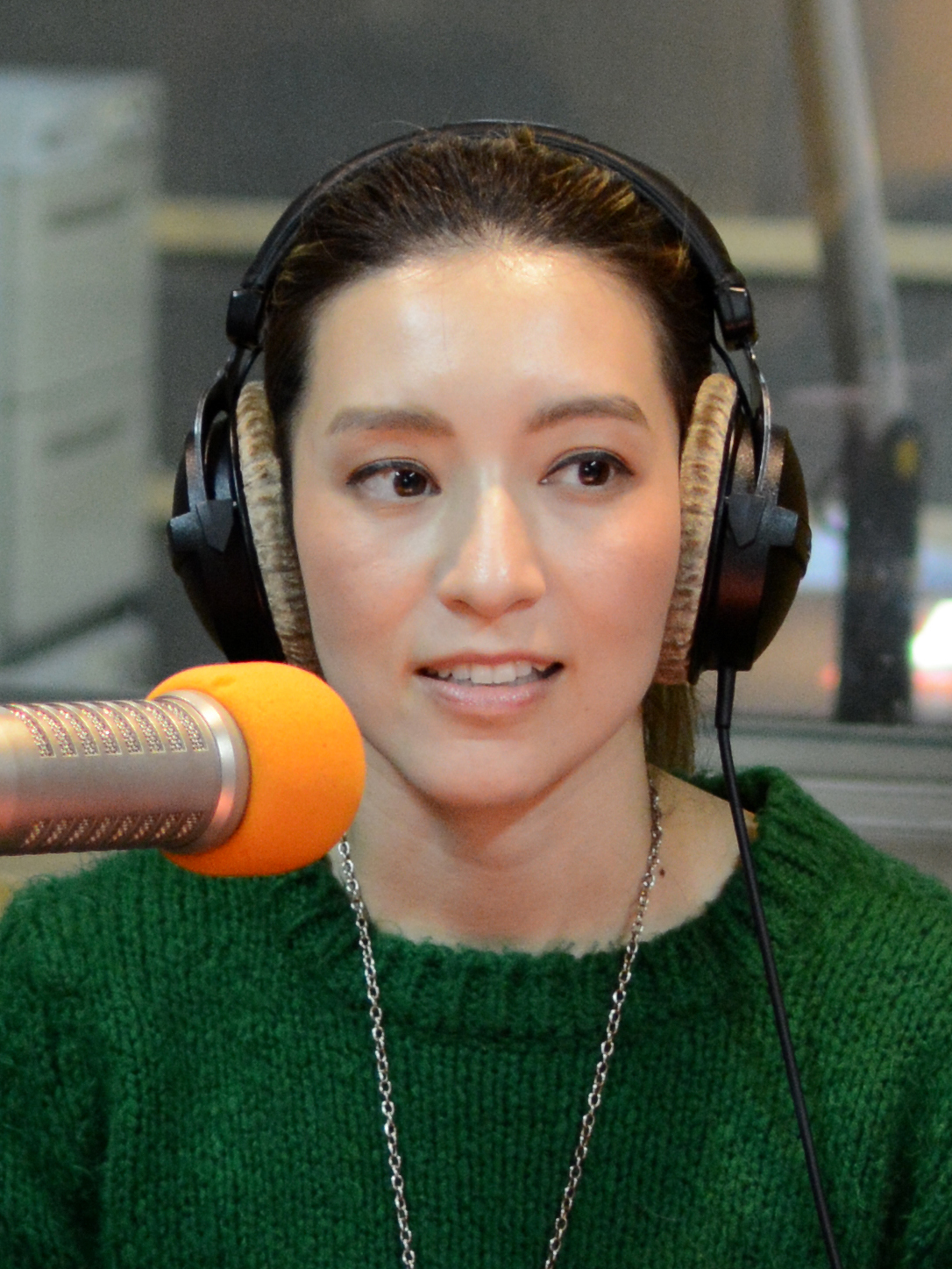

Background information
- Also known as: Lara Liang (梁心頤)
- Born: Lara Veronin; California, United States
- Genres: Pop, Folk rock
- Occupation: Singer-songwriter
- Instrument: Guitar
- Years active: 2004–present
- Labels: Alfa Music (2004–2009); JVR Music (2009–2013); Meimeiwawa Multimedia (2013–2020); NSMG (2021–present)
- Formerly of: Nan Quan Mama

Lara Veronin, also known as Lara Liang (traditional Chinese: 梁心頤; simplified Chinese: 梁心颐; pinyin: Liáng Xīnyí), is a Taiwanese-American singer.

== Career ==
=== Nan Quan Mama ===
Lara was born in California, United States in 1988, and she moved back to Taipei, Taiwan with her older sister, Esther Veronin, and her parents in 2001, where she graduated from Taipei American School in 2006.

Having participated in music performances and music groups from a young age, Veronin was discovered in 2005 by Taiwanese pop star Jay Chou and became the female frontman in Chou's second iteration of his band project: "Nan Quan Mama". That same year, Lara also skyrocketed to fame when she released a duet with Jay Chou titled "Coral Sea" (Shān Hú Hǎi). In Nan Quan Mama, Veronin acted not only as a performer but often also as songwriter and/or lyricist, where she collaborated often with bandmate Chase Chang (Chinese:張傑|p=Zhāng Jíe) on creating tracks.

During this time, Veronin also made her first forays into acting, having starred in 2006 Taiwanese drama series Engagement for Love (《爱情经纪约》; àiqíng jīngjì yuē) with Alex To and Ambrose Hsu. She also was lead actress in 2012 Taiwanese drama series "Alice in Wonder City" (《給愛麗絲的奇蹟》; gěi aìlìsī dė qíjī).

=== JVR Music ===
In 2009, Lara left Nan Quan Mama and started her solo career at Jay Chou's label, JVR Music. On December 6, 2010, she formally released her first solo album, "Hello Lara Liang" (《Hello 梁心頤》).

On October 29, 2012, Lara released her second solo album titled "Free Spirit" (《自由靈魂》), where she started participating in musical and creative direction, composing, and producing as well as in the styling and marketing aspects of album release. Her second album also boasted 11 songs, and she even collaborated with former Nan Quan Mama bandmate Chase on one of the songs, "Fragments"(suì piàn).

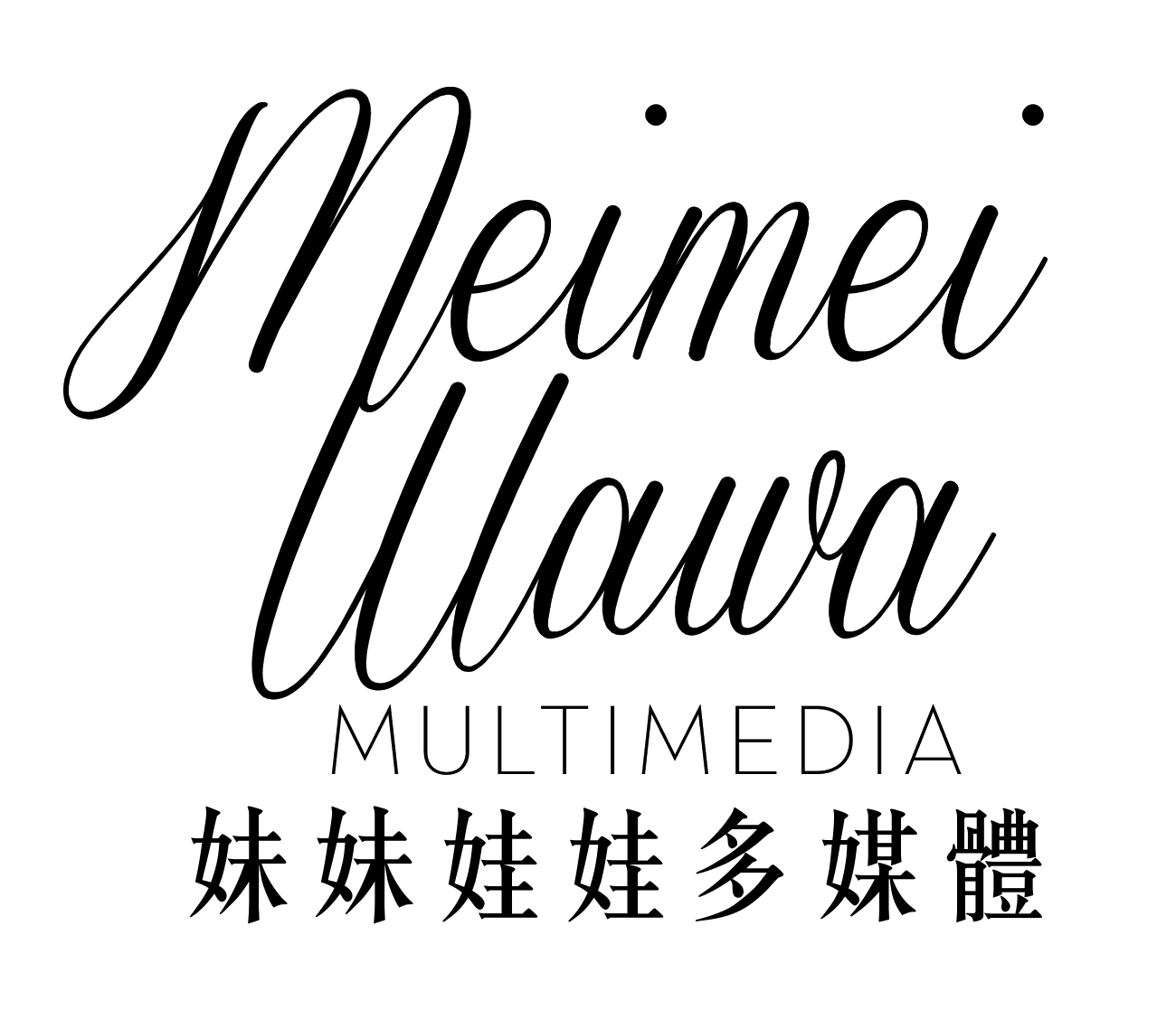
The independent multimedia firm started by Lara and sister Esther Veronin

=== Meimeiwawa Multimedia ===
After much deliberation, Veronin decided to leave JVR Music in 2013 and founded Meimeiwawa Multimedia (mèimèiwáwá dūoméitǐ; "Meiwa Media" for short) with her sister Esther Veronin. Meiwa Media, while simultaneously doubling as Lara's record label and talent agency, also operates as a creative platform putting out content in music, entertainment, and various other subjects. Over the years, the company has put out several visual ventures such as short films, vlogs, and an internet faux-reality web series, titled "Meiwa Diaries". Temporarily setting aside music, Lara joined her sister in the ranks of film production and co-wrote a micro movie titled "TAWKI: Taipei As We Know It", where she also played Holly, the lead. Since then, the Veronin sisters have put out multiple short films and micro movies with Lara as lead actress, including the 2014 production "Who Killed Joanna Wang?" starring Joanna Wang as well as the 2015 productions "Still Better Than Love" and "She Wore Red", which won the award for Best Cinematography in the Tainan 39-Hour Short Film Contestival.

In 2015, Lara released her first single under the Meimeiwawa Multimedia label, a song called "Dida". The accompanying music video was filmed in Taipei and directed by Esther Veronin. The video was selected as the theme song to the "Fluid Sexuality International Film Festival" in 2015 due to the fact that it touched upon LGBT themes, something both Veronin sisters have publicly expressed support for. The song was also released in collaboration with the Red Cross Society of the Republic of China where a limited amount of physical albums were released for sale, and all profits went towards donations for the Red Cross.

Over the next two years, three more of Lara's singles were released under Meiwa Media：

- 2016《Where Do We Go》
- 2017《Play/Turn》
- 2017《Sunshine》

In 2018, the Veronin sisters decided to challenge themselves by making Lara's third solo album, "Thousand-Faced Beast" into a feature-length film titled "Tomorrow's Star". While Lara takes her debut on the silver screen, once again, as lead actress, she and Esther do not forget to focus on their imperative of empowering females in the independent art industry. Other actors include known Taiwanese celebrities such as Mathilde Lin, Johnny Lu, Denny Huang, Phoebe Yuan, and Stephen Rong. All eight songs and their music videos from the album were woven into the movie in a manner akin to musical films, and four of the songs ("Thousand-Faced Beast", "Watch Out", "Precious Pain", and "No Absolutes") were also released separately as digital singles.

=== NSMG ===
Since 2021, Lara has exclusively partnered with NSMG to release her latest album “Dear You”, a tribute to Mandopop love ballads. Focused tracks "Quitting U" and "No More U" have achieved chart-topping success across streaming platforms.

== Personal life ==
Besides voice acting for Disney, Veronin has dabbled in hosting for television and radio, as well as contributed articles to magazines. She stated that one of her first passions was, and is, writing and she hopes to pursue this in various ways in the future.

On May 29, 2015, Veronin's mother died after collapsing from a cardiac stress test after complaints of chest pain.

== Solo concerts ==
Since the release of her first album "《HELLO 梁心頤》" in 2010, Lara has been active in live performances. In 2015 she also took up a residency at Brown Sugar Jazz Club with sister Esther Veronin. While sometimes she performs with a backing track out of convenience, she tries to perform with a live band whenever possible.

Lara also performs frequently at schools and commercial events around Taiwan, as well as in Malaysia, Australia, and North America. Oftentimes during her solo performances, she also invites friends to join her onstage. Some performers that she's collaborated with in live gigs include, but are not limited to: Joanna Wang, Dawen, Maxine Chi, Alex Ni, DJ Noodles, and Haor.

Taiwan Solo Concerts
Series	Years	Month	Day	Venue	City
《HELLO 梁心頤》Concert	2010	December	10	Eslite Bookstore Musicstore	Taipei
《HELLO 梁心頤》Concert	2010	December	12	Dream Mall Oval Plaza	Kaohsiung
《HELLO 梁心頤》Concert	2011	April	3	Riverside Café	Taipei
US Cotton Concert	2011	June	3	Legacy Taipei	Taipei
《Freedom Flower》Music Party	2012	November	17	Park of South	Tainan
《Freedom Flower》Music Party	2012	November	18	Chungyo Department Store	Taichung
《Freedom Flower》Music Party	2012	November	24	Hanshin Arena Shopping Plaza	Kaohsiung
《Freedom Flower》Music Party	2012	November	25	Taipei Metro Tamsui metro station Back Plaza	New Taipei City
《Freedom Flower》Music Party	2012	December	7	ThERE CAFÉ	Taoyuan
《Freedom Flower》Music Party	2012	December	28	Ximen Riverside Café	Taipei
《In Amalgamy》 Concert	2014	January	18	Legacy Taipei	Taipei
《Dida》 Mini Concert	2015	January	30	Ximen Riverside Café	Taipei
Voice Up Concert	2016	May	8	Legacy Taipei	Taipei
《Where Do We Go》 Rooftop Concert	2017	February	4	「ATT 4 FUN」FRANK Taipei	Taipei
《Because Of You》 Concert	2017	October	1	Woolloomooloo Out West	Taipei
Sofar Sounds Taipei	2018	April	22	Believer Café & Bar	Taipei
Discover Asia – 《Thousand-Faced Beast》Concert	2018	November	11	Syntrend Creative Park Clapper Studio	Taipei

== Work in Music ==
While she was with Nan Quan Mama, Lara took part in the creation and performance of four albums, all distributed by Alfa Music and Sony Music. After leaving Nan Quan Mama, Lara released two solo albums under JVR Music, and then one more solo albums under Meimeiwawa Multimedia after she left JVR in 2013. She has also received some accolades from competitions or general outstanding musicianship.

=== Albums ===
Nan Quan Mama
Year	Album name (Chinese)	Album name (English)	Distribution
2005	《南搞小孩》	《Problem Children》	Alfa Music & Sony Music
2006	《藏寶圖》	《Treasure Map》	Alfa Music, YaLu Music, & Sony Music
2007	《調色盤》	《Color Palette》	Alfa Music & Sony Music
2008	《2號餐》	《Meal no. 2》	Alfa Music & Sony Music

Solo
Year	Date	Album name (Chinese)	Album name (English)	Distribution	Note
2010	December 6	《HELLO 梁心頤》	《HELLO Lara Liang》	JVR Music	
2012	October 29	《自由靈魂》	《Free Spirit》	JVR Music	
2018	October 23	《千面獸》	《Thousand-Faced Beast》	Meimeiwawa Multimedia	October 23 is digital, physical release is December 5, 2018
2020	November 17	《RE》	《RE》	Meimeiwawa Multimedia	Digital Mix Album release is November 17, 2020
2021	July 20	《來者何人N!》	《Dear You N!》	NSMG	Digital Album release is July 20, 2021
2021	September 14	《來者何人{}》	《Dear You {}》	NSMG	Digital Album release is September 14, 2021

=== Non-Album Music ===
Apart from releasing music in albums, Lara also has physical and digital singles, both released and unreleased. Three unreleased singles were written as spokesperson brand theme songs.

Solo Singles
Year	Month	Title	Distribution	Type	Note
2010	November	《我沒有+Where Have All The Flowers Gone》	JVR Music及Sony Music Taiwan	Digital & Physical	
2010	December	《Everything》	JVR Music及Sony Music Taiwan	Physical	
2012	May	《Darling》	JVR Music及Sony Music Taiwan	Digital & Physical	
2012	October	《Free Spirit》	JVR Music及Sony Music Taiwan	Digital	
2013	March	《Dream Garden》	JVR Music及Sony Music Taiwan	Digital	
2014	December	《Dida》	Meimeiwawa Multimedia	Digital	
2016	December	《Where Do We Go》	Meimeiwawa Multimedia	Digital & Physical	
2017	February	《Where Do We Go (Soul Remix)》	Meimeiwawa Multimedia	Digital	Feat. TroutFresh & SmashRegz
2017	April	《Where Do We Go (Ukulele Version)》	Meimeiwawa Multimedia	Digital	Ukulele version
2017	August	《Play/Turn》	Meimeiwawa Multimedia	Digital	
2017	September	《Sunshine》	Meimeiwawa Multimedia	Digital	
2017	October	《Realization》	Meimeiwawa Multimedia	Digital	with JerryC
2018	August	《Thousand-Faced Beast》	Meimeiwawa Multimedia	Digital	
2018	September	《Watch Out》	Meimeiwawa Multimedia	Digital	
2018	September	《Precious Pain》	Meimeiwawa Multimedia	Digital	
2018	October	《No Absolutes》	Meimeiwawa Multimedia	Digital	
2019	January	《Open Heart (Terry Zhong Remix)》	Meimeiwawa Multimedia	Digital	

Brands & Shows Jingles
Year	Month	Title (Chinese)	Title (English)	Performer	Credit	Note
2009	January	《眼鏡寶貝》	《Glasses Baby》	Nan Quan Mama	Lyrics	"Formosa Optical" Jingle
2012	May	《夢織花園》	《Dream Garden》	Lara Liang	Lyrics	Opening theme for 《Alice in Wonder City》
2012	September	《悄悄佔據你》	《Taking Over Slowly》	Lara Liang	Topline	Theme for micro movie 《Taking Over Slowly》

=== Awards and Accolades ===
Year	Event	Award
2008	KKBOX Digital Music Charts	Chinese Singles Charts 3rd Place 《Rainy Day》
2011	2010 Annual Sprite China Original Pop Music Chart Awards	《Newcomer Award 2010》
2016	10th "Music King" Awards Ceremony	《Most Improved Singer》
2018	Pop Awards New Flow Annual Awards	《Best Singer – Electronica》

== Songwriting ==
Lara has taken on the bulk of her own songwriting as well as occasionally writing for other musicians on their works.

Songwriting Credit
Year	Month	Album (Chinese)	Album (English)	Performer	Title (Chinese)	Title (English)	Credit
2005	May	《2號餐》	《Meal no.2》	Nan Quan Mama	《寫給巧克力的歌》	《A Song for Chocolate》	Topline
2005	August	《調色盤》	《Color Palette》	Nan Quan Mama	《TONIGHT》		Lyrics
2006	May	《調色盤》	《Color Palette》	Nan Quan Mama	《水晶蜻蜓》	《Crystal Dragonfly》	Topline
2006	July	《調色盤 (影音加值搖滾盤)》	《Color Palette》(Special)	Nan Quan Mama	《Rock》		Lyrics
2007	July	《藏寶圖》	《Treasure Map》	Nan Quan Mama	《湘南海鷗》	《Xiangnan Seagull》	Lyrics
2007	July	《藏寶圖》	《Treasure Map》	Nan Quan Mama	《公主戀愛手冊》	《A Princess's Guide to Love》	Lyrics
2007	July	《藏寶圖》	《Treasure Map》	Nan Quan Mama	《Here We Go》		Lyrics
2007	July	《藏寶圖》	《Treasure Map》	Nan Quan Mama	《泡沫》	《Bubbles》	Topline
2008	July	《南搞小孩》	《Problem Children》	Nan Quan Mama	《下雨天》	《Rainy Day》	Lyrics
2009	October	《袁詠琳Cindy同名專輯》	《Cindy Yen》	Cindy Yen	《雨後天空》	《Sky After Rain》	Lyrics
2009	October	《袁詠琳Cindy同名專輯》	《Cindy Yen》	Cindy Yen	《笨魚》	《Dumb Fish》	Lyrics
2010	December	《HELLO 梁心頤》	《HELLO Lara Liang》	Lara Liang	《Everything》		Lyrics
2010	December	《HELLO 梁心頤》	《HELLO Lara Liang》	Lara Liang	《胡椒與鹽》	《Salt & Pepper》	Lyrics
2010	December	《HELLO 梁心頤》	《HELLO Lara Liang》	Lara Liang	《我不再怕》	《Not Scared Anymore》	Lyrics
2010	December	《HELLO 梁心頤》	《HELLO Lara Liang》	Lara Liang	《當秋天遇上秋天》	《When Autumn Meets Autumn》	Lyrics
2010	December	《HELLO 梁心頤》	《HELLO Lara Liang》	Lara Liang	《John》		Lyrics
2010	December	《HELLO 梁心頤》	《HELLO Lara Liang》	Lara Liang	《貝殼》	《Seashell》	Topline
2010	December	《HELLO 梁心頤》	《HELLO Lara Liang》	Lara Liang	《Crescent City》		Lyrics
2010	December	《HELLO 梁心頤》	《HELLO Lara Liang》	Lara Liang	《小樹》	《Little Tree》	Lyrics
2010	December	《HELLO 梁心頤》	《HELLO Lara Liang》	Lara Liang	《奇妙》	《Magical》	Lyrics
2011	October	《樂酷．概念合輯》	《Cool Music．Concept》	梁心頤	《4Chords》		Topline
2011	October	《2 be Different》		Cindy Yen	《我想要迷路》	《I Want to Get Lost》	Lyrics
2011	October	《I'm Not A Gentleman》		Gary Yang	《Someday You'll See》		Lyrics
2011	October	《I'm Not A Gentleman》		Lara Liang & Gary Yang	《黑色靜態》	《Static Black》	Lyrics
2011	December	《自由靈魂》	《Free Spirit》	Lara Liang	《Talking》		Topline
2011	December	《自由靈魂》	《Free Spirit》	Lara Liang	《自由靈魂》	《Free Spirit》	Lyrics
2011	December	《自由靈魂》	《Free Spirit》	Lara Liang	《Darling》		Topline
2011	December	《自由靈魂》	《Free Spirit》	Lara Liang	《蘋果》	《Apple》	Lyrics
2011	December	《自由靈魂》	《Free Spirit》	Lara Liang	《蛻變》	《Metamorphoses》	Topline
2011	December	《自由靈魂》	《Free Spirit》	Lara Liang	《碎片》	《Fragments》	Lyrics
2011	December	《自由靈魂》	《Free Spirit》	Lara Liang	《骨頭》	《Bones》	Topline
2011	December	《自由靈魂》	《Free Spirit》	Lara Liang	《不敢哭》	《Don't Dare Cry》	Lyrics
2011	December	《自由靈魂》	《Free Spirit》	Lara Liang	《舒適的牢籠》	《Comfortable Cage》	Lyrics
2014	December	《滴答》單曲	《Dida》 Single	Lara Liang	《滴答》	《Dida》	Lyrics
2016	December	《Where Do We Go》EP		Lara Liang	《Where Do We Go》		Topline
2017	August	《千面獸》	《Thousand-Faced Beast》	Lara Liang	《玩轉》	《Play/Turn》	Topline
2017	September	《陽光》單曲	《Sunshine》 Single	Lara Liang	《陽光》	《Sunshine》	Topline
2018	October	《千面獸》	《Thousand-Faced Beast》	梁心頤	《千面獸》	《Thousand-Faced Beast》	Topline
2018	October	《千面獸》	《Thousand-Faced Beast》	梁心頤	《蹦蹦蹦》	《Watch Out》	Lyrics
2018	October	《千面獸》	《Thousand-Faced Beast》	梁心頤	《最愛的痛》	《Precious Pain》	Lyrics
2018	October	《千面獸》	《Thousand-Faced Beast》	梁心頤	《沒有絕對》	《No Absolutes》	Lyrics
2018	October	《千面獸》	《Thousand-Faced Beast》	梁心頤	《明日之星》	《Tomorrow's Star》	Lyrics
2018	October	《千面獸》	《Thousand-Faced Beast》	梁心頤	《閉眼》	《Eyes Closed》	Topline
2018	October	《千面獸》	《Thousand-Faced Beast》	梁心頤	《忘掉》	《Forget》	Topline
2018	October	《千面獸》	《Thousand-Faced Beast》	梁心頤	《心打開》	《Open Heart》	Topline
2018	November	《千面獸》	《Thousand-Faced Beast》	梁心頤		《Burn》	Lyrics
2018	November	《千面獸》	《Thousand-Faced Beast》	梁心頤		《Eyes Closed》	Lyrics
2018	November	《千面獸》	《Thousand-Faced Beast》	梁心頤		《Fight》	Topline

== Filmography ==
Apart from being a singer and songwriter, Lara has also participated in many cinematic projects ranging from music videos to TV series and musicals before even starting her multimedia company.

Naturally once she established Meimeiwawa Multimedia, she started taking on the role of writer as well as producer on certain ventures. In her 2018 joint project with her sister of the 《Thousand-Faced Beast》and《Tomorrow's Star》 double feature, she also took up the role of lead actress in her first feature-length film.

Television
Year	Month	English title	Chinese title	Role
2006	Nov	Engagement For Love	《愛情經紀約》	Xuan Meng Tiao
2012	May	Alice in Wonder City	《給愛麗絲的奇蹟》	Lan Die Fei

Micro Films
Year	Month	Title (Chinese)	Title (English)	Role	Note
2012	Apr	《愛情的兩張臉》	《Two Faces of Love》	Lara Liang/Xiao P	Collaboration with Pond's
2012	Sep	《悄悄佔據你》	《Slowly Taking Over》	Guan Xin Jue	Collaboration with Test Rite
2013	Sep	《台北據我們所知(番外篇) – 果汁刮刮樂》	《TAWKI: Taipei As We Know It – Scratch & Win》	Holly	
2014	May	《下流社會》	《Lower Society》	Doudou	
2014	Oct	《誰殺了王若琳》	《Who Killed Joanna Wang?》	Lara Liang	Won 「Best Costume」&「Best Music」at 48 Hour Film Project Taipei
2015	Spr	《紅》	《She Wore Red》	Her	Won「Best Cinematography」at Tainan 39-hour Film Contestival
2017	Jul	《比真愛還好》	《Still Better Than Love》	Tang	

Feature-Length Film
Year	English title	Chinese title	Role	Notes
2011	《Tangled》	《魔髮奇緣》	Rapunzel (Voice)	Mandarin version
2018	《Tomorrow's Star》	《明日之星》	Lssse	Cinematic Visual Album

=== Musicals and Music Videos ===
Musicals
Year	Month	Title (Chinese)	Title (English)	Role
2015	May	《小時代音樂劇》	《Little Age Musical》	Gu-Li

Music Video Features
Year	Month	Artist	Title (Chinese)	Title (English)
2005	Nov	Jay Chou	《珊瑚海》	《Coral Sea》
2008	Nov	Jay Chou	《蛇舞》	《Snake Dance》
2012	Jul	Jay Chou	《琴傷》	《Piano Pangs》
2012	Dec	Gary Yang	《黑色靜態》	《Black Static》
2012	Dec	Jay Chou	《大笨鐘》	《Big Ben》
2013	Jan	Jay Chou	《比較大的大提琴》	《An Even Larger Cello》
2013	May	What Century	《愛情不是偶像劇》	《Love is Not a TV Drama》

=== Behind the Scenes ===
Production Roles
Year	Month	Role	Type	Title
2013	Sep	Screenwriter	Micro movie	《TAWKI: Taipei As We Know It – Scratch & Win》
2013	Oct	Producer	Micro movie	《House of Champions》
2015	Apr	Producer	Micro movie	《She Wore Red》

== Brand Collaborations ==
=== Spokesperson Advertising ===
Year	Brand/Product	Region	Note
2005	Hi-Life Convenience Store	Taiwan	
2006	Piaggio PGO Scooters	Taiwan	Theme song:《Pink First Love》
2006	Motorola Cellphone	Taiwan	Theme song:《ROCK》
2007	FamilyMart Food Commercial	Taiwan	
2007	Coca-Cola	Asia	Chinese theme song
2007	2010 Shanghai World Expo	Greater China	Promotional Video
2008	【Angels Online 2】MMO	Taiwan	Annual Spokesperson
2008	Motorola A810 Chinese Handwriting Tablet	Taiwan	
2008	Kosé-Fasio	Taiwan	Regional Spokesperson
2009	Formosa Optical	Taiwan	Theme Song:《Glasses Baby》
2010	FarEasTone	Taiwan	Tablet Commercial + Theme Song
2010	Guide Dog Angels	Taiwan	Theme Song:《When Autumn Meets Autumn》
2011	CottonUSA	Taiwan	Annual Spokesperson
2011	Young Ladies' Wear	Taiwan	Annual Spokesperson
2011	Clarins Instant Smooth	Taiwan	
2011	Pond's Perfect Matte	Hong Kong & Taiwan	Annual Spokesperson
2011	7-Eleven Hot Drink	Taiwan	
2012	Pond's Perfect Matte	Hong Kong & Taiwan	Annual Spokesperson
2012	Test Rite	Taiwan	Micro movie《Taking Over Slowly》
2012	Kaohsiung Flora Art Expo	Taiwan	
2012	Master Kong Mini Puffs	Greater China	
2013	Pond's Perfect Matte	Hong Kong & Taiwan	Annual Spokesperson
2017	J&V Watches	Taiwan	Theme Song：《Play/Turn》
