= Chris Burton =

Chris Burton may refer to:

- Chris Burton (Australian footballer) (born 1961), Australian rules footballer
- Chris Burton (equestrian) (born 1981), Australian equestrian
- Chris Burton (rugby league) (born 1956), British rugby league footballer
- Chris Burton (singer), Danish singer, songwriter

Also:

- Khris Burton
