= One-minute film =

Type of film

A one-minute film is a micro movie that lasts exactly 60 seconds. Although it belongs to the microcinema constellation, it is distinct for being precisely timed. There are film festivals dedicated to it.

The one-minute film implies a creative challenge due to its brevity, which demands an exercise of synthesis when writing the script. It is appreciated by filmmakers and film schools as a tool to deepen cinematic understanding and a way to acquire, with its realization, new levels of craftsmanship.

The appearance of one-minute films can be traced back to the birth of cinema, with the first pieces by Auguste and Louis Lumière being very close to one minute long.

== One-Minute film festivals ==
- Filminute
- Croatian Minute Movie Cup
- Gotta Minute Film Festival – Edmonton, Canada
- 1-Minute Film Competition, Australia and New Zealand
- One Minute Story Film Festival, New Jersey, United States.
- One Minute Film & Video Festival, Aarau, Switzerland.
- Quickie Fest: The One Minute Movie Festival New York, United States.
- Cineminuto Córdoba, Argentina.
- Festival Internacional de Cineminuto, Mexico.
- Festival Mundial do Minuto Brasil.
- Lancillotto al Cinema, Italy
- The One Minutes
- Tiny Film Festival, Ann Arbor District Library, Michigan, United States.
- The Just A Minute Festival, Winchester, Massachusetts, United States.
- La danza in 1 minuto (dance films), Turin, Italy.

== See also ==
- Short film
- Micro movie
- List of short film festivals
