= Esther Veronin =

Taiwanese-American director, singer, actress (born 1987)

Esther Veronin 梁妍熙
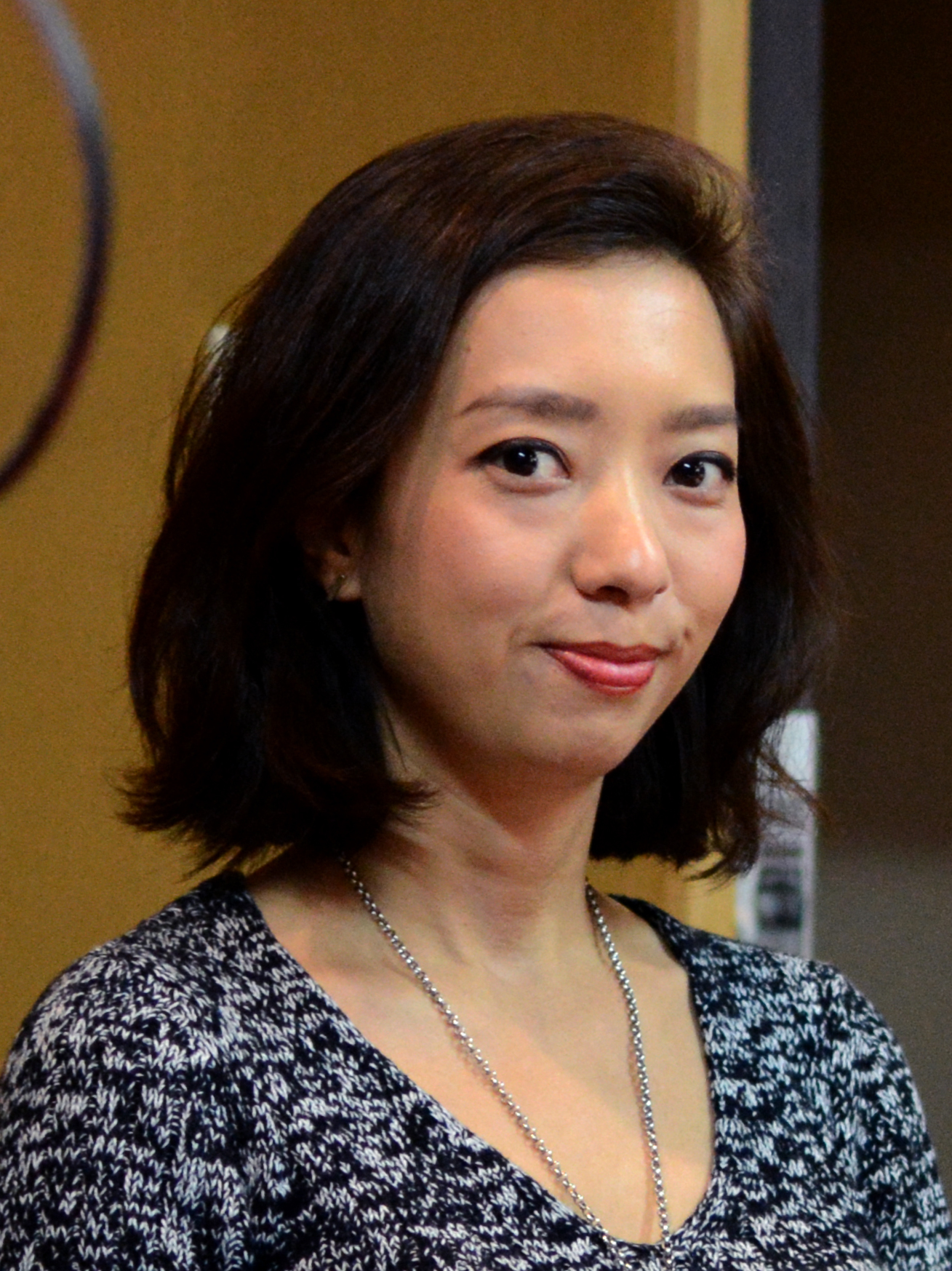

Background information
- Born: 11 March 1987 (age 39); California, United States
- Occupations: director, singer, actress, ceo
- Instrument: Piano
- Years active: 2013–present

Esther Veronin (born 11 March 1987), is a Taiwanese-American director, singer, actress and CEO of entertainment startup Meimeiwawa Multimedia. She is the elder sister of singer Lara Veronin.

== Career ==
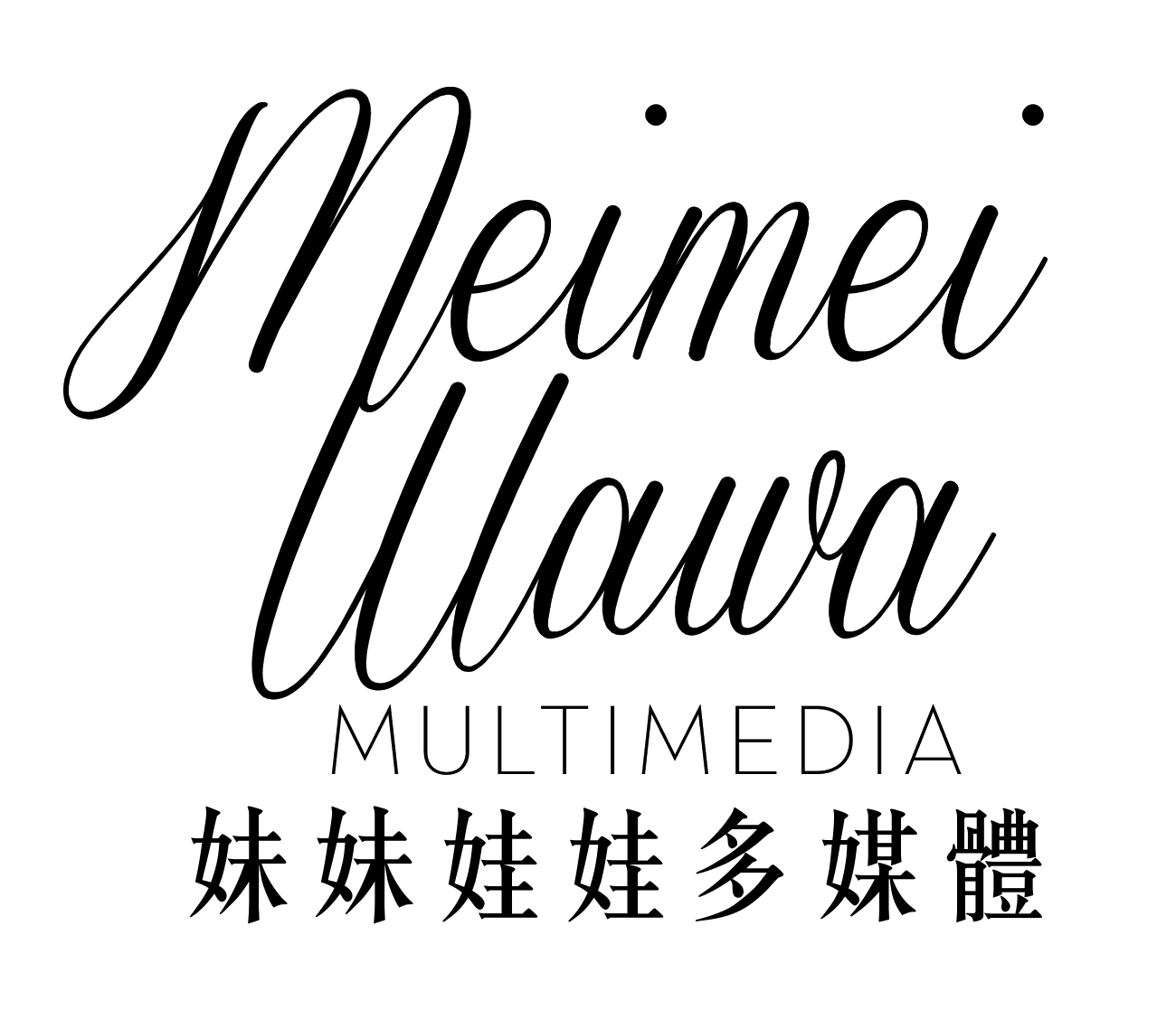
Meimeiwawa's logo since 2015

In May 2013, Veronin and sister Lara Veronin founded Meimeiwawa Multimedia, (Chinese: 妹妹娃娃多媒體; pinyin: mèimèi wáwá dūo méi tǐ; "Meiwa Media" for short), an entertainment and lifestyle themed start-up that creates multimedia content. Esther, as CEO and co-founder has directed all short and long-form content produced by Meimeiwawa, including their entries in the Taipei stop of the 48-hour film project, as well as their award-winning contribution to the Tainan 39 Hour Short Film Contestival, for which they received the accolade of ‘Best Cinematography’ in 2015.

In 2015, the sisters introduced a new online web series called ‘Meiwa Diaries’ under a new concept ‘Faux reality’, which depicts snippets of their daily lives in a partly fictional manner.

One of their first international film project was "Taipei As We Know It (TAWKI), an English-language webseries set in Taipei, Taiwan touching on social issues and quirks of the sisters' homeland, Taipei.

In 2018, Veronin wrote, directed, and produced her first feature-length film, "Tomorrow's Star", which starred her sister Lara and combined the music from Lara's third solo album "Thousand-Faced Beast" into a cinematic visual album.

== Performance ==
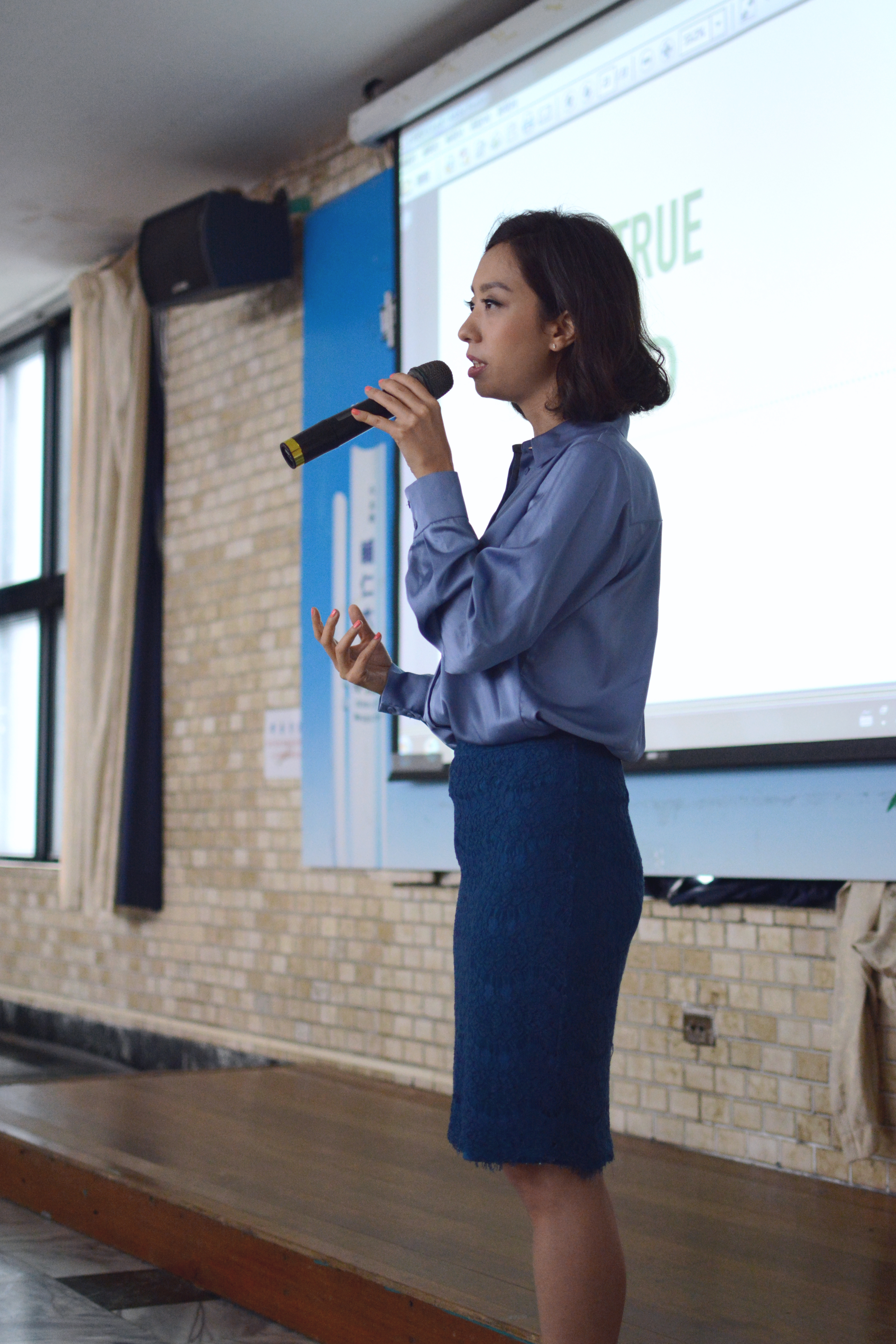
Esther Veronin speaking at FJU for Women's Week 2019

During mid-2014, Veronin also participated in the "Global Taiwanese songwriting and singing competition", gaining attention for her similarity in appearance to Taiwanese actress Mirandu Lu, and for her moving performance. Veronin also participated in the direction of sister Lara Veronin’s music video for her 2014 single "Dida", which was selected as the theme song for the "Fluid Sexuality International Film Festival" in 2015. Both sisters have publicly expressed their advocacy of LGBT rights.

Veronin also received glowing reviews of her performance in The LAB's stage performance of the 1966 play Wait Until Dark by Frederick Knott, having been praised by the Taipei Times to "shine in the challenging lead role".

From 2014 to 2015, both Veronin sisters sang regularly at Brown Sugar, a jazz club in Taipei, where they performed a medley of both Taiwanese and Western music.

== Activism ==
Veronin is an outspoken participant in feminist and LGBT issues, having participated in many women-powered events in Taiwan. Both Veronin sisters also use Meimeiwawa Multimedia and their own popularity as platforms to raise awareness on various social issues via mediums such as events, music videos, short films, and movies.

Most recently in 2019, Esther and Lara were both named as spokespeople and partners to the Modern Women's Association in their campaign against sexual violence of "Only Yes Means Yes".

== Personal life ==
On 29 May 2015, Veronin's mother died after collapsing from a cardiac stress test.

== Filmography ==
As CEO and Co-founder of Meimeiwawa, Veronin also takes on the roles of screenwriting, directing, editing, and producing various visual content put forth by the company. The genres of such visual content range from short films to music videos and even a feature film.

Short Film
Year	Role	English title	Chinese title	Note
2013	Writer-director	《Taipei As We Know It "TAWKI"》	《台北據我們所知》	Comedy short film
2014	Writer-director	《Who Killed Joanna Wang?》	《誰殺了王若琳》	Best Soundtrack & Costume in 48 Hour Film Project Taipei
2015	Writer-director	《She Wore Red》	《紅》	Best Cinematography in the Tainan 39-Hour Short Film Contestival
2015	Executive Producer	《Still Better Than Love》	《比真愛還好》	Official selection for the Los Angeles Asian Pacific Film Festival
2015	Writer-director	《Meiwa Diaries》	《妹娃日記》	Faux reality web series
2016	Writer-director	《Taipei As We Know It》	《台北據我們所知》	Mini short film series
2016	Writer-director	《Newbie Dad》	《那些被罵後才知道的事》	Collaboration with the National Development Council (Republic of China)

Feature Film
Year	Role	English title	Chinese title	Genre
2018	Writer-director	《Tomorrow's Star》	《明日之星》	Cinematic Visual Album

Music Video
Year	Role	English title	Chinese title	Artist
2015	Writer-director	《Dida》	《滴答》	Lara Liang
2016	Writer-director	《Where Do We Go》		Lara Liang
2017	Writer-director	《Play/Turn》	《玩轉》	Lara Liang
2018	Writer-director	《Watch Out》	《蹦蹦蹦》	Lara Liang
2018	Writer-director	《Tomorrow's Star》	《明日之星》	Lara Liang
2018	Writer-director	《Precious Pain》	《最愛的痛》	Lara Liang
2018	Writer-director	《No Absolutes》	《沒有絕對》	Lara Liang
2018	Writer-director	《Thousand-Faced Beast》	《千面獸》	Lara Liang
