= Choose Not to Fall =

2010 short film by Matthew Marsh

Choose Not To Fall
- Directed by: Matthew Marsh
- Produced by: Mummu
- Release date: 2010

Choose Not To Fall is a 2010 short film directed by Matthew Marsh, shot by Davidé Hazeldine III, with music from Stephen Schlaägter produced by Mummu. The film discusses the practice of parkour, featuring parkour practitioner Daniel Ilabaca. The film won Best Film from Filminute 2010, gold from the Pepsi Short Film contest and Best 1 minute film from the Azyl Film Festival 2011.
