= Ignacio Rodó =

Spanish filmmaker (born 1986)

Ignacio Rodó (born December 11, 1986) is a Spanish filmmaker.

He has a great trajectory in the world of short films, where his work has won more than 200 awards and has been selected for over 1,000 international film festivals (including several Oscar qualifying).

He is best known for his short film Tuck me in (2014), which got more than 250 selections in film festivals, several awards and millions of views on the internet.

== Selected filmography ==
=== Short films ===
- The Nest (2025).
- Al fresco (2024).
- Retrato (2024).
- Pan y vino (2023).
- In Corpus (2023).
- Pandemia zombie (2022).
- Usted dirá (2021).
- Mordisquitos (2021).
- Flight to Earth (2021).
- Centrifugado (2020).
- Deep Down (2019).
- The Afterbirth (2018).
- Bonsai (2017).
- Tomasito (2017).
- El abogado (2016).
- Exposure (2015).
- Naranjito (2015).
- Tuck Me In (2014).
- Despedidas (2013).
- Prometeo (2012).
