= The Journal of Short Film =

Film journal (2005–2015)

The Journal of Short Film was a quarterly DVD publication of peer-reviewed short films of all genres, from 2005 to 2015 [Vols 1-39]. It was published by the Ohio State University Film Studies Program. The journal is modeled on the literary journal, complete with an editorial board made up of filmmakers.

Periodically, the journal hosted guest editors of note, including Sam Green, Deborah Stratman, Lucy Raven, and Karl Lind. In October 2007, the journal collaborated with WITNESS on a collection of documentaries highlighting human rights around the world. This collaboration became Volume 9. In 2009, Volume 14 was released as a collection of films produced in the Art & Tech residency program at the Wexner Center. The Library Journal called the JSF one of the "Best Magazines of 2005."

The journal was founded in 2005 by Karl Mechem, who hoped to fill a hole in film distribution and create a new venue for short film. In late 2009, publication moved to the Ohio State University and was operated by the OSU Film Studies Program.
