= Nan Quan Mama =

Taiwanese music group

- Born: Taiwan
- Occupation: Musical group
- Years active: 2004–2011, 2015–present

Chinese name
- Traditional Chinese: 南拳媽媽
- Simplified Chinese: 南拳妈妈
Transcriptions
Standard Mandarin
- Hanyu Pinyin: Nán Quán Māmā
- Musical career
- Origin: Taiwan
- Genres: Mandopop
- Labels: Alfa Music and Sony BMG (2004-2015); Seed Music (2016–present)
- Members: Devon Song; Jaffri Cao; Sing Hom; Jie Cheng
- Past members: Yuri Chan; G-Power; Gary Yang; Lara Veronin; Chase Chang; Vera Yen
- Website: NQMaMa

Nan Quan Mama (Chinese: 南拳媽媽; pinyin: Nán Quán Māmā; lit. 'southern fist mother') is a Taiwanese music group. The name is a phrase in Mandarin to explain having strength while being gentle as a mother. They are closely tied with the well-known artist Jay Chou, but it was revealed after Lara and Chase Chang went solo that the name came from Jay's pen name when he was in high school when he started writing songs, and it was meant to mean 'Nan Quan's Mother', so it was actually a metaphor for Jay's mother. The group was nominated for Best Singing Group at the 19th Golden Melody Awards in 2008.

Each of the members contribute to composing their songs, and also sing together in most of their songs, although some of their songs are composed and sung solely by one of the members, such as the song "Crystal Dragonfly" (水晶蜻蜓) which was composed and sung by Lara. As of June 2006, they are the official spokespeople for Motorola in Taiwan.

== Members ==
=== Current ===
- Devon Song (宋健彰) (2004–present)
- Sing Hom (洪言翔) (2015–present)
- Jaffri Cao (曹景豪) (2015–present)
- Jie Cheng (陳羽緁) (2017–present)

=== Former ===
- Yuri Chan (詹宇豪) (2004-2014)
- G-Power (鐘佐泓) (2004-2005)
- Gary Yang (楊瑞代) (2004-2005)
- Lara Veronin (梁心頤) (2005-2009)
- Chase Chang (張傑) (2005-2009)
- Vera Yen (嚴正嵐) (2016)

== Discography ==
Album#	Title	Release Date	Label
1st	Nan Quan Mama's Summer (南拳媽媽的夏天)	14 May 2004	Alfa Music
2nd	Meal No.2 (2號餐)	17 August 2005	Alfa Music
3rd	Color Palette! (調色盤)	26 May 2006	Alfa Music
4th	Treasure Map (藏寶圖)	20 July 2007	Alfa Music
5th	Difficult Kids (優の良曲南搞小孩)	25 July 2008	Alfa Music
6th	Fighting with Bach (決鬥巴哈)	8 July 2010	Alfa Music
7th	All New Attack (拳新出擊)	9 May 2016	Seed Music

== Awards and nominations ==
Year	Award	Category	Nomination	Result	Ref
2005	Metro Radio Hits Music Awards 新城勁爆頒獎禮	Best Mandarin Song	"消失" (Disappear)	Won	
2005	Metro Radio Hits Music Awards 新城勁爆頒獎禮	Best Mandarin Group	Nan Quan Mama	Won	
2008	19th Golden Melody Awards	Best Singing Group	Nan Quan Mama	Nominated	
