= Filminute =

Filminute official logo

Filminute is the international one-minute film festival dedicated to presenting, promoting and awarding one-minute films. Filminute was founded in 2005 and the inaugural festival ran in September 2006. Filminute looks for films that deliver a well-balanced equation of content, acting, dialogue, storytelling, photography and sound design. Filminute accepts films from the categories of fiction, animation, documentary and mashup.

== Information ==
The annual festival and competition runs during the month of October (Filminute 2021 ran from 15 October to 15 November). An international jury consisting of people from the fields of filmmaking, literature, art and communications is responsible for the awarding of Best Filminute. Audiences worldwide are invited online to view and vote for the People's Choice Award.

=== Filminute 2006 ===
Filminute 2006 featured submissions from 25 countries. Best Filminute honours went to Anton Groves for his UK-Romanian production Line. The People's Choice Award was won by Wayne Campbell for his UK production It Could Be. According to Ekow Eshun, artistic director of London's Institute of Contemporary Arts and Filminute 2006 jury member, Filminute "demonstrated a high level of polish and a strong and exciting progression in user-generated content. Filminute has raised the bar in its first year and I am very interested to see how high the bar can go".

=== Filminute 2007 ===
Filminute 2007 generated submissions from 45 countries. The jury-awarded Best Filminute went to Kristina Grozeva's Game (Bulgaria), while the People's Choice was awarded to Siddartha Jatla's Missing (India). During an October 2007 television interview with Filminute co-founder and executive director John Ketchum, CBC journalist and host Evan Solomon described Filminute as "the future of modern storytelling".

=== Filminute 2008 ===
Filminute 2008 drew submissions from 60 countries. The jury-awarded Best Filminute went to Oli Hyatt's StitchUp Showdown - Gym Jam (UK) and The People's Choice was awarded to Pici Papai's Quick (Hungary). The 2008 festival attracted a great deal of media attention including that of Wired.com whose headline ran, "If those sprawling three-minute YouTube clips seem to drag on forever, Filminute, the international one-minute film festival, might be right up your alley."

=== Filminute 2009 ===
Filminute 2009 drew submissions from 55 countries. The jury-awarded Best Filminute went to UK's Phil Sansom & Olly Williams for their film Black Hole. The People's Choice was awarded to Canada's James Cooper for Life. The 2009 festival drew many positive reviews including by Ronald Bergan in The Guardian which praised Filminute's collection of "technically impressive mini-movies" and the festival's commitment and focus "on story".

=== Filminute 2010 ===
Filminute 2010 featured the Academy-Award nominated District 9 South African director, Neill Blomkamp on the jury. He was joined by Leo Burnett's Global Chief Creative Officer, Mark Tutssel, Indian filmmaker and producer, Tanuja Chandra, and FIPRESCI film critics Ronald Bergan and Jan Lumholdt. Together they awarded UK director Matthew Marsh's moving documentary film Choose Not to Fall as Best Filminute. It marked the first time a documentary had taken the festival's top prize. Romanian director Dorin Pene won the 2010 People's Choice Award for his comedy A New Prayer.

=== Filminute 2011 ===
Filminute 2011 was honored to have the Academy & Emmy Award-winning Pakistani-Canadian filmmaker Sharmeen Obaid-Chinoy on the jury. Joined by FIPRESCI film critic Alin Tasciyan and Walt Disney Imagineering SVP, Jon Snoddy, and others, they awarded Spanish filmmaker Aritz Moreno Best Filminute for his highly captivating and inventive film, Loop. The 2011 People's Choice award was won by Dutch director, Shariff Nasr, for his moving hospital drama Oblivion. The Top Rated film was won by Australian director Dominic Chambers for his chilling thriller No Man's Land.

=== Filminute 2012 ===
Filminute 2012 marked the second time an animation won Best Filminute, with Director Ant Blade's Chop-Chop (UK) taking the top prize. As well, Ant Blade was only the third filmmaker in the festival's eight-year history to have two films shortlisted in the same year. The People's Choice award was won by Ben Jacobson for his smirk-inducing drama Candy Crime (UK). In addition to a record 134 countries tuning in to see the films, and a surge in the number of comedies, 2012 also saw the festival's eastern presence grow with strong shortlisted films from Lithuania, Georgia, Turkey, and Russia.

=== Filminute 2013 ===
Filminute 2013 welcomed American independent filmmaker Richard Linklater and FIPRESCI film critic Carmen Gray to the jury who, together with the other members, awarded Best Filminute honours to Dutch filmmaker David Stevens for his excellent documentary M-22. At the same time, the big story at the festival's 8th edition was Martinique filmmaker Khris Burton's film Maybe Another Time, which won the People's Choice and Top Rated awards, as well as finishing first in the Jury Commendations. It was the strongest finish ever for a single film at the festival.

=== Filminute 2014 ===
At Filminute 2014, Ignacio Rodó's thriller Tuck Me In (Spain), won the jury-awarded Best Filminute. The People's Choice award went to André Marques' film Grandpa (Portugal), which also impressed with a Jury Commendation, a runner-up ranking for Top Rated, as well as the inaugural Cineuropa Audience Award.

=== Filminute 2015 ===
Filminute held its 10th anniversary in 2015 with Guillaume Renusson's French sign-language film A Minute of Silence winning Best Filminute. Multiple Filminute award-winner Khris Burton returned to take the People's Choice award for his film Nanny (Martinique). And the Top Rated award went to Romania's George Molesag for his drama Rematch.

=== Filminute 2016 ===
Filminute 2016 featured the Taiwanese filmmaker Hou Hsiao-Hsien on the jury. Together with author John Vaillant, FIPRESCI journalist Barbara Hollender and others, the jury awarded Best Filminute honours to Rohin Raveendran's film Paijana (India). The French animation Voltige won the People's Choice Award. Cutting Room by Canadian directors Nathan White and Richard Colmer won the Top Rated award.

=== Filminute 2017 ===
Filminute 2017 included on its jury Baronessa Beatrice Monti, the founder and president of the Santa Maddalena Foundation, the Tuscan writing retreat that has partnered with Filminute since the inaugural festival in 2006. Through its partnership with Women In Film, Filminute also included Ghanaian-American film director Priscilla Anany. Together with their fellow jurors they awarded Best Filminute honours to Iranian director Kaveh Jahed's migrant thriller, A Share of a Share. The People's Choice award went to American director Jin Ryu for his docu-drama Megan. The Top Rated award went to Comic Relief by Colombian director Carlos Andres Reyes. Filminute 2017 also saw the launch of the first Filminute Development Prize, sponsored by CineCoup.

=== Filminute 2018 ===
Filminute 2018 welcomed to the jury Sebastian Lelio, winner of the 2017 Academy Award (Best Foreign Film) for ‘Una Mujer Fantastica.’ Alongside the award-winning Colombian writer Juan Gabriel Vasquez, the ground-breaking American talent agent and producer Nikki Weiss-Goldstein, and others, the jury chose South Korean director Nuri Jeong's deftly directed thriller Edge of Seventeen for Best Filminute. Argentinian director Alejandro Itkin's corruption tale Air Time received top honours from the public, and the Top Rated award went to Iranian director Mahdi Borgian for his touching film Soul Mate. Nuri Jeong also took home the CineCoup sponsored Filminute Development Prize.

=== Filminute 2019 ===
Filminute 2019 featured a female jury presence including: prolific, award-winning French editor & director Anne Goursaud; American PEN award-winning fiction writer Maile Meloy; acclaimed Canadian Executive Producer, Indira Guha; and the respected Turkish FIPRESCI film critic, Alin Tasciyan. Together with rest of the jury they awarded Best Filminute to French directors Merick & Gohu for their powerful and original migrant tale I Am Not Afraid. The People's Choice Award was won by Uruguay's Facundo Sosa for his chilling look at the future of immigration entitled Uno de Nosotros. And the Top Rated award went to Spanish director Manuel Martin Merino for Searching his light-hearted and comedic look at dating in the digital age. Hungarian director Regős Ábel won the Filminute Development prize for his action-packed discrimination drama The Tenants.

=== Filminute 2020 ===
Due to the worldwide COVID-19 pandemic, Filminute 2020 was postponed.

=== Filminute 2021 ===
After the worldwide pandemic forced the postponement of the 2020 festival, Filminute 2021 returned with a strong international jury and 25 films drawn from over 3,000 entries. Led by Filminute Executive Director John Ketchum, influential Turkish filmmaker Pelin Esmer, and prolific Canadian animator Anne Marie Fleming, the jury awarded Best Filminute to Iranian director Moein Rooholamini for his moving refugee drama, Leo. And for only the second time in the festival's history, one film, Uncounted, by Colombian director Carlos Andrés Reyes, was awarded both the People's Choice and Top Rated awards. Uncounted also received the first jury commendation, completing a spectacular run for a deeply moving film about a mother's love for her children set against the backdrop of drug cartel-inspired violence. It was the second Top Rated award for Carlos Andrés Reyes following his 2017 win for Comic Relief.

=== Filminute 2022 ===
Filminute 2022 featured a predominantly female jury led by Canadian producer and director Miranda de Pencier, Romanian filmmaker Cecília Felméri, FIPRESCI film critic Marta Blaga, and Film and Festival Sholar Dr. Estrella Sendra. Along with the Filminute jury team they awarded Best Filminute to Georgian animator, Petre Tomadze for his incredibly powerful domestic abuse drama, Night Session. It was only the second time in Filminute history that an animation won the top award. The People's Choice award, amazingly, also went to a Georgian animation: Khatuna Tatuashvili's delightful, emotional ode to the love of cats, Oh! Mother, Mother... Filminute 2022 also saw the inauguration of its Best Performance award, won by Jana Errando for her superb comedic timing and pent-up turn in Paper-Thin Walls.

=== Filminute 2024 ===
The Filminute 2024 jury brought together new, notable jurists, including award-winning Chilean director Marialy Rivas, award-winning Colombian director Carlos Andrés Reyes and Italian FIPRESCI film critic Paola Casella, as well as returning juror Nikki Weiss-Goldstein, a Hollywood-based talent agent and producer. The jury awarded the Best Filminute to Canadian film What Did They Say? by Kevin Jin Kwan Kim. The 2024 People's Choice award went to Sandekala by Arfi Sn, which marked the first time an Indonesian film had been shortlisted as well as had won an award. The 2024 Best Performance award went to Spain's Charo Bergón for her performance in the Spanish film Stitch in Mouth.

== Winners ==
=== Filminute 2006 ===
- Best Filminute – Line, Anton Groves (UK/Romania);
- People's Choice – It Could Be, Wayne Campbell (UK).

=== Filminute 2007 ===
- Best Filminute – Game, Kristina Grozeva (Bulgaria);
- People's Choice – Missing, Siddartha Jatla (India);
- Top Rated Film – Game, Kristina Grozeva (Bulgaria).

=== Filminute 2008 ===
- Best Filminute – Stitch Up Showdown – Gym Jam, Oli Hyatt (UK);
- People's Choice – Quick, Pici Papai (Hungary);
- Top Rated Film – Immerse, Anton Groves (UK/Romania);

=== Filminute 2009 ===
- Best Filminute – The Black Hole, Phil Sansom and Olly Williams (UK);
- People's Choice – Life, James Cooper (Canada);
- Top Rated Film – Sun-Day, Pantaleone A. Megna (Italy).

=== Filminute 2010 ===
- Best Filminute – Choose Not To Fall, Matthew Marsh (UK);
- People's Choice – A New Prayer, Dorin Pene (Romania);
- Top Rated Film – Dark Valley, Oskar Arnarson (Iceland).

=== Filminute 2011 ===
- Best Filminute – Loop, Aritz Moreno (Spain);
- People's Choice – Oblivion, Sharrif Nasr (Netherlands);
- Top Rated Film – No Man's Land, Dominic Chambers (Australia).

=== Filminute 2012 ===
- Best Filminute – Chop Chop, Ant Blades (UK);
- People's Choice – Candy Crime, Ben Jacobson (UK);
- Top Rated Film – Lady, Tamta Gabrichidze (Georgia).

=== Filminute 2013 ===
- Best Filminute – M-22, David Stevens (Netherlands);
- People's Choice – Maybe Another Time, Khris Burton (Martinique);
- Top Rated Film – Maybe Another Time, Khris Burton (Martinique).

=== Filminute 2014 ===
- Best Filminute – Tuck Me In, Ignacio Rodó (Spain);
- People's Choice – Grandpa, André Marques (Portugal);
- Top Rated Film – Earth's Last Hope, Riccardo Servini (UK).

=== Filminute 2015 ===
- Best Filminute – A Minute of Silence, Guillaume Renusson (France);
- People's Choice – Nanny, Khris Burton (Martinique);
- Top Rated Film – Rematch, George Molesag (Romania).

=== Filminute 2016 ===
- Best Filminute – Paijana, Rohin Raveendran (India);
- People's Choice – Voltige, Brunel Léo (France);
- Top Rated Film – Cutting Room, Nathan White & Richard Colmer (Canada).

=== Filminute 2017 ===
- Best Filminute – A Share of a Share, Kaveh Jahed (Iran);
- People's Choice – Megan, Jin Ryu (USA);
- Top Rated Film – Comic Relief, Carlos Andres Reyes (Colombia).

=== Filminute 2018 ===
- Best Filminute – Edge of Seventeen, Nuri Jeong (South Korea);
- People's Choice – Air Time, Alejandro Itkin (Argentina);
- Top Rated Film – Soul Mate, Mahdi Borjian (Iran);

=== Filminute 2019 ===
- Best Filminute – I Am Not Afraid, Merick & Gohu (France);
- People's Choice – Uno De Nosotros / One Of Us, Facundo Sosa (Uruguay);
- Top Rated Film – Searching, Manuel Martín Merino (Spain).

=== Filminute 2020 ===
- Festival postponed due to worldwide pandemic.

=== Filminute 2021 ===
- Best Filminute – Leo, Moein Rooholamini (Iran);
- People's Choice – Uncounted, Carlos Andrés Reyes (Colombia);
- Top Rated Film – Uncounted, Carlos Andrés Reyes (Colombia).

=== Filminute 2022 ===
- Best Filminute – Night Session, Petre Tomadze (Georgia);
- People's Choice – Oh! Mother, Mother..., Khatuna Tatuashvili (Georgia);
- Best Performance – Jana Errando in Ignacio Rodó's Paper-Thin Walls (Spain).

=== Filminute 2024 ===
- Best Filminute – What Did They Say?, Kevin Jin Kwan Kim (Canada);
- People's Choice – Sandekala, Arfi Sn (Indonesia);
- Best Performance – Charo Bergón, in Dani Lardón's Stitch In Mouth (Spain).

== General references ==
- The Ten Best One-Minute Films of the Past Decade Tasteofcinema.com, September 30, 2015;
- This Film Scared the Hell Out of Me Gizmodo.com, October 9, 2014;
- VOTE FOR THE FILMINUTE CINEUROPA AUDIENCE AWARD Cineuropa.org September 12, 2014;
- 60-SECOND KNOCKOUTS:Watch 5 Cool Movies in 5 Minutes Fast Company (fastcocreate.com) September 17, 2014;
- Hart, Hugh (September 3, 2008). "Wired.com's Picks From Filminute's Microvideo Short-List". Wired.
- Hart, Hugh (August 25, 2008). "Filminute's Attack of the International Supershorts". Wired.
- Paul Haggis joins Filminute jury, Variety, July 8, 2008;
- Filminute 2007 Picks, Eye Weekly, 2007;
- Filminute 2007, CBC.ca, 2007;
- Il Festival più breve del mondo..., La Repubblica, October 16, 2007;
- Czech Center Presentation, Czech Center Romania, October 19, 2007;
- Friends of the Earth green film competition in association with Filminute, Friends of the Earth, 2007;
- Filminute: A 60-second challenge, Cineuropa.org, The European Cinema Portal, June 25, 2007;
- What’s a one-minute film?, The In Crowd, March 4, 2006;
- The DGC invites you to participate in FILMINUTE, The Director Guild of Canada, May 12, 2006;
- Filminute Inaugural, BBC – Film Network, 2006;
- Filminute Recommendation, Daily Candy, Sept 7, 2006;
- Filminute, feeder.ro, September 5, 2007.
