= Chris Burton (singer) =

Danish singer songwriter

Chris Burton is a Danish singer songwriter who became famous with his 2019 debut release "Love Letters" followed by "Little Sister" also in 2019, both charting on Hitlisten, the official Danish Singles Chart. He was considered as one of the most exciting male solo artists to emerge in 2019 from Denmark and performed in Denmark's Spot Festival in May of the same year. He partnered with Tory Lanez for a brand new single titled "What Sucks About Love".

== Discography ==
=== Singles ===
Year	Single	Chart positions	Album	Ref(s)
Year	Single	DEN	Album	Ref(s)
2019	"Love Letters"	32		
2019	"Little Sister"	29		
2019	"What Sucks About Love" (feat. Tory Lanez)			
