= Khris Burton =

Caribbean director

Christian Rodin known as Khris Burton (born February 29, 1980, in French Guiana) is a Caribbean music, film and commercial director.

== Early life and career ==
Burton was born in French Guiana on February 29, 1980. He attended Ecole superieure de Realisation Audiovisuelle (ESRA) where he received training in cinematography, TV Broadcasting, scriptwriting and sound engineering. Khris belonged to a musical band where he composed, directed and performed. In 2011, Société des auteurs, compositeurs et éditeurs de musique (SACEM), bestowed him with an award for his music video "Treve de bavardages" which he released in 2009. In 2015, his short film "Nanny" won People's Choice Award and Jury 2nd Commendation at the 10th edition of Filminute.

In 2019, Khris served as an educator at Parallel 14 Academy, the first visual effect school in the Caribbean founded by Saidou Bernabe and Yoane Pavade. His short movie "Maybe Another Time" won People's Choice Award Top Rated and Jury 1st Commendations at the 8th edition of Filminute. His movie also won Best Narrative Ultra Short Award at Berlin International Film Festival. He is currently producing his upcoming film, "Insensible". His short film S0.CI3.TY (2016), was one of the official selection of Pan African Film Festival in 2017. He is the founder of Darers Films, a film production company based in Martinique, as well as HBK Motion Pictures in Nigeria.

Khris Burton gained massive popularity after his one minute short movie titled "Maybe Another Time" went viral.

== Filmography ==
- Nanny (2015)
- Maybe Next Time (2013)
- Calvaire (2017)
- Minuit Quarante (2014)
- Insensible (2020)
- Pull Up (2017)
- S0.CI3.TY (2017) - Short
