= Micro movie =

Type of short film

A micro movie is a type of short film characterized by a low budget and distribution via social media.

Micro movies originated in Hong Kong in 2010. Karen Mok (Hong Kong–based singer and actress) and Adam Duke starred in "Cadillac," which is regarded as the first micro movie. Afterwards, micro movies became a trend in South Asia. As professional-grade technology has become more accessible, amateurs hoping to enter the film industry have turned to the micro movie format to avoid limitations imposed by television and film studios. The accessibility of production, along with a growing popularity, has led to a wide range of subjects being featured and examined in the micro movie format.

== Characteristics ==
- Short film duration
- Distributed via social media websites
- Good connection to daily lives
- Low budget
- Commercial or non-commercial
- Includes all genres

== Censorship ==
Movie censorship is the legal process that regulates whether a movie, film, video, or cinema has content that is permissible to undergo broadcast and distribution. While certain movies are permitted to undergo public disbursement and release, other types of movies are limited to private screenings—in certain cases, movies are prohibited and banned in their entirety. Movie censorship regulation takes length, content, and subject matter into consideration with regard to altering or banning the work. Obscene and violent content is avoided in the process of making micro movies due to national censorship policies.

In Hong Kong, all films are required to undergo the motion picture rating system, which is organized by the Office for Film Newspaper and Article Administration (OFNAA). Movies are rated I, IIA, IIB, or III. Scenes deemed to be unacceptable are censored. The Chinese State Administration of Press, Publication, Video, Film and Television oversees the theatrical release, to ensure that immoral content is not promoted in the movies. The goal of these measures is to protect the audience from receiving extreme and unhealthy messages.

In Australia, The Office of Film and Literature Classification is responsible for classifying films, video publications, and PC games according to the National Classification Code and the Classification Guidelines, which are approved by the Commonwealth State and Territory Ministers responsible for censorship.

There is, however, more leniency in censorship online—especially on YouTube. That is why most micro movies are accessed through social media websites and online databases. Some countries even block all internet access to YouTube.

== Cinematography ==
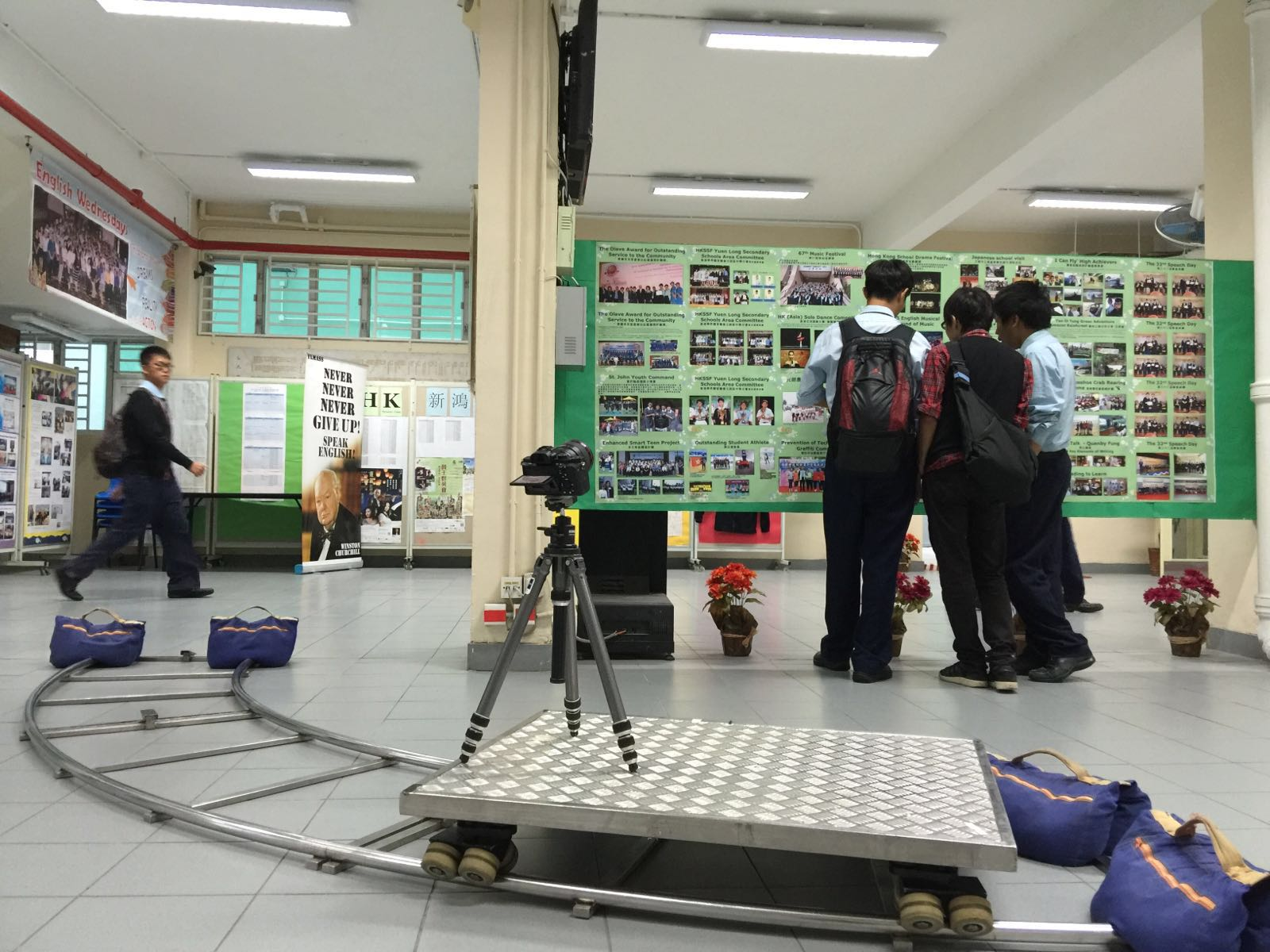
Example setup for filming micro movies.

Micro movies are created by cinematographers of all skill levels, ranging from a first-time producer to a high-level producer with a top-level cast and crew.

Film techniques used in micro movies are similar to those of traditional movies seen in theaters. For instance, the types of shots and angles are the same, but they typically differ in film length, equipment level, budget, number of cast and crew, and acting skill. There are, however, exceptions to the rule such as the group Rocket Jump or prime-time TV commercials.

== Application ==
Micro movies are used for advertising and entertainment purposes. The short length of micro movies allows them to be promoted and published on platforms such as YouTube and Facebook. This makes micro movies free, easy to access, and able to go viral online.

There are both commercial and noncommercial needs for micro movies. Commercials are now not only selling a product, but telling a story— the Budweiser and Extra Gum commercials are examples of this. Micro movies have become a new way to promote products and brands. People also create and shoot micro movies for fun. There are several micro movie film festivals and platforms for both amateurs and professionals to tell their stories and be recognized for their work.

== Examples of micro movies ==
- OPPO endorsement film Find Me
- Route 66
- The Bright Eleven-Old Boys
- Rapido (Long Distance Love)
- J'attendrai le Suivant Sub Chinois
- Love is All You Need
- Finch's Landing
- Holding the Rain
- The Elevator
- 2088
- Curtains Down: The Last Rod!
- The Black Hole

== Examples of micro movie competitions ==
- Nottingham International Microfilm Festival (NIM)
- Beijing International Micro Film Festival
- Lander University Film Festival
- New Jersey Micro Minute Film Festival
