= Short film =

Film with a low running time

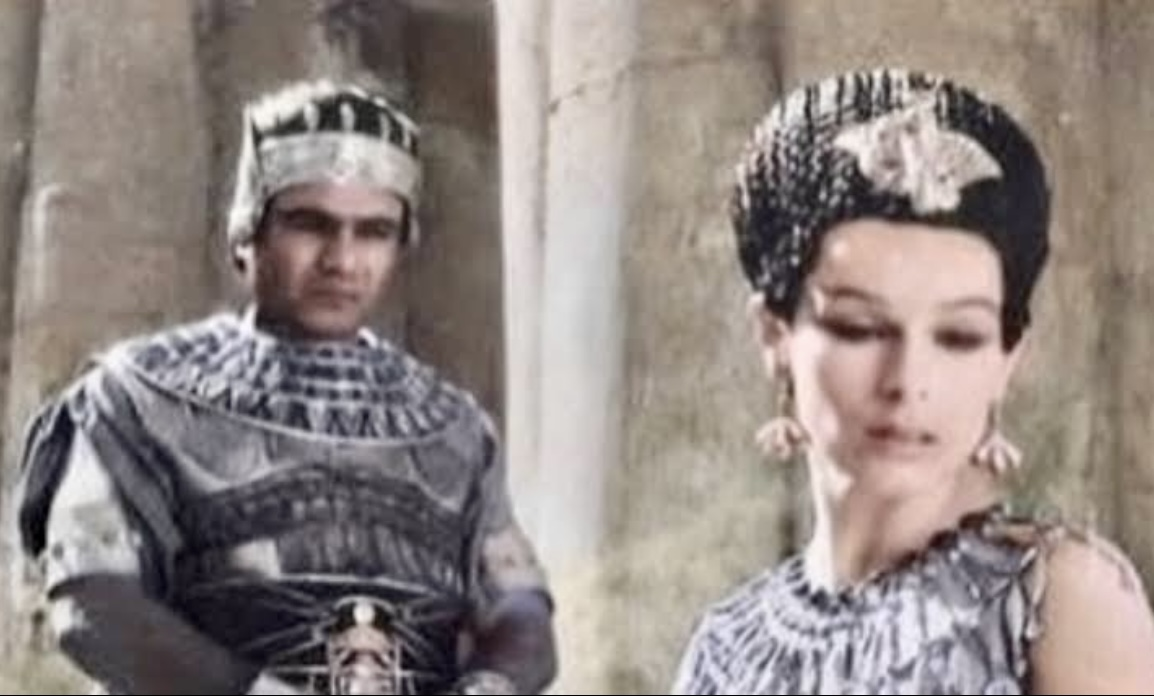
Salah Zulfikar (left) and Geraldine Chaplin in Nefertiti y Aquenatos (1973), a film with a 30-minute running time

A short film is a film with a short running time. The Academy of Motion Picture Arts and Sciences (AMPAS) defines a short film as "an original motion picture that has a running time of not more than 40 minutes including all credits". Other film organizations may use different definitions, however; the Academy of Canadian Cinema and Television, for example, currently defines a short film as 45 minutes or less in the case of documentaries, and 59 minutes or less in the case of scripted narrative films.

In the United States, short films were generally termed short subjects from the 1920s into the 1970s when confined to two 35 mm reels or less, and featurettes for a film of three or four reels. "Short" was an abbreviation for either term.

The increasingly rare industry term "short subject" carries more of an assumption that the film is shown as part of a presentation along with a feature film. Short films are often screened at local, national, or international film festivals and made by independent filmmakers with either a low budget or no budget at all. They are usually funded by one or more film grants, nonprofit organizations, sponsors, or personal funds. Short films are generally used for industry experience and as a platform to showcase talent to secure funding for future projects from private investors, a production company, or film studios. They can also be released with feature films, and can also be included as bonus features on some home video releases.

== History ==
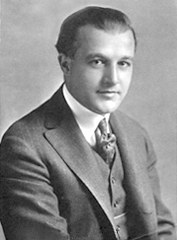
William Garwood starred in numerous short films, many of which were 20 minutes in length.

The term "short subject" was used by studios and exhibitors as a label for short films that "filled out a theatrical program," since a schedule in a 1930s movie theater could include – in addition to the feature film – newsreels, animated shorts, a two-reel comedy, and a chapter from a serial film. To fit on the limited runtime of one and two film reels, short films tended to focus on one to a few characters within a single situation.

Films in the beginning of cinema were very short, sometimes running only a minute or less. The first short films were presented in 1891 by Thomas Edison's device called a kinetoscope and the Edison Company. By 1894, the kinetoscope had achieved commercial success in public showrooms, though only one person could view a film at a time.

Early short films were often captured in a single shot, and were commonly depicted events such as everyday life, royal processions, and travelogues. One of the best known early films was Arrival of a Train at La Ciotat (1895) by the Lumière brothers.

The briefness of films imitated popular entertainment of the era, such as music halls, fairground acts, magic lantern shows, variety acts, and tableaux presentations. These programs tended to last up to about 20 minutes per show. Notable films of the early 20th century include Georges Méliès’s A Trip to the Moon (1902) and Edwin S Porter’s The Great Train Robbery (1903).

It was not until the 1910s when films started to get longer than about 10 minutes and were comprised of multiple film reels. The transition to feature-length films occurred about 1910 through 1915, and films increased from an average of 18 minutes to 75 minutes. This change in runtime was due to advancement in camera equipment, studio competition, and audience demand. However, shorts continued to be screened in revues along with news reels and live acts, up until World War II. As short films grew longer and more popular, major studios had dedicated departments to creating comedies, cartoons, newsreels, and serial shorts.

Soundies were short American-produced films that presented a musical performance in a coin-operated jukebox called a Panoram. Over 1,850 Soundies were produced between 1939 to 1947. The business venture was, ultimately, financially unsuccessful.

The 1920s through the 1950s is widely considered the "golden age" of short films. Major successes of the silent film era include Hal Roach Studios (mainly due to the Our Gang shorts), and Charlie Chaplin's character, The Tramp.

=== One-reel subjects ===
Theater managers found it easier and more convenient to fit shorter, one-reel (10-minute) subjects into their double-feature programs. In the live-action field, humorist Robert Benchley had been making short comedies since the dawn of sound; his various series for Fox, Vitaphone, Metro-Goldwyn-Mayer, and Paramount ran from 1928 to 1944 (and MGM reissued several in 1955 and 1956). MGM's Pete Smith Specialties had been a standard "added attraction" in moviehouse programming since 1935 and lasted through 1955. RKO's Flicker Flashbacks revivals of silent films ran from 1943 to 1956, and Warner Bros.' Joe McDoakes comedies became a regular series in 1946 and lasted until 1956.

Travelogues had been popular since the silent-film days. Their leading exponent was James A. FitzPatrick, who produced dozens of picturesque one-reel subjects in America and around the world, almost all of them in Technicolor, from 1931 to 1953. In February 1954 FitzPatrick delivered his last four reels for MGM release, and then resigned from the company to become a lecturer on cruise ships, for the Swedish American Lines. FitzPatrick attended a demonstration of Paramount's new, panoramic VistaVision process in 1954, and signed with that studio to make a series of two-reel "VistaVision Visits", the first being VistaVision Visits Norway (1954), which was released alongside the studio's first VistaVision feature film, White Christmas.

By and large, however, the movies' one-reel subject of choice was the animated cartoon, produced by Walt Disney, Warner Bros., MGM, Paramount, Walter Lantz, Columbia, and Terrytoons. Cartoon shorts had a longer life, due in part to the implementation of lower-cost limited animation techniques and the rise of television animation, which allowed shorts to have both theatrical runs and a syndication afterlife. Warner Bros., one of the most prolific of the golden era, underwent several reorganizations in the 1960s before exiting the short film business in 1969 (by which point the shorts had been in televised reruns for years). MGM continued Tom and Jerry until 1967 (first with a series of poorly received Eastern European shorts by Gene Deitch, then a better received run by Warner Bros. alumnus Chuck Jones). Walter Lantz's Woody Woodpecker lasted until 1972. William Hanna and Joseph Barbera, the creative team behind MGM's 1940s and 1950s cartoons, formed Hanna-Barbera Productions in 1957, mainly focusing on television. The Pink Panther was the last regular theatrical cartoon short series, having begun in 1964 (and thus having spent its entire existence in the limited-animation era) and ended in 1980. By the 1960s, the market for animated shorts had largely shifted to television, with existing theatrical shorts being syndicated to television.

=== Two-reel comedies and serials ===
The year 1938 proved to be a turning point in the history of film comedies. Hal Roach, for example, had discontinued all short-subject production except Our Gang, which he finally sold to Metro-Goldwyn-Mayer in 1938. The Vitaphone studio, owned by Warner Bros., discontinued its own line of two-reel (20-minute) comedies in 1938; Educational Pictures did as much that same year, owing to its president Earle W. Hammons unsuccessfully entering the feature-film field. With these major comedy producers out of the running, Columbia Pictures actually expanded its own operations and launched a second two-reel-comedy unit in 1938.

RKO Radio Pictures kept making new two-reel comedies until 1953. After the deaths of RKO's comedy perennials Edgar Kennedy and Leon Errol, RKO kept many of their respective shorts in circulation until these reissues were canceled at the end of December 1955. Columbia continued to produce new comedies and reissue old ones throughout the 1950s.

With the rise of television, the commercial live-action short was virtually dead; most studios discontinued their live-action series in 1956. Only The Three Stooges kept making two-reel comedies; their last was filmed in December 1957 and released in June 1959.

=== Serials ===
One of film's oldest short-subject formats was the serial. Theatrical serials were produced in the US from 1912 to 1956, as the format's decline coincided with the rise of television. What Happened to Mary (1912), produced by Thomas Edison, is often identified as the first American film serial.

Serials were programmed with feature films. The average serial's run lasted two to four months, and viewers were expected to return weekly to see the story continue in the next installment. Silent serials ran up to 20 chapters long, and were reduced to between 12 to 15 chapters during the sound-era. The most common trait of serial storytelling was the cliffhanger; each episode would conclude with a suspenseful ending, and the next episode recapped the previous episodes' storylines. The format leaned towards anecdotal storytelling by making use of stock characters and story elements, as well as reoccurring settings and props. In the 1910s through the '20s, common leading characters were adventurous "serial queens" and rough-and-tumble men. Mystery serials were also popular, featuring detectives, policemen, and civilians protagonists.

Universal Pictures, Columbia Pictures, and Republic Pictures were the major producers of serials during the 1930s. Universal stopped making them in 1946. Republic ended serials' production in 1955. The final American-made serial was Columbia's Blazing the Overland Trail in 1956.

== Modern era ==
Paulie, a short film released in 2012

In the 1980s, with the rise of MTV, music videos became an outlet for short film-makers. Director Tim Pope has noted that music videos' "rhythmic fast-paced style of editing" has possibly influenced the editing of feature films.

In the 1990s and 2000s, advancements in light-weight and affordable videotape and digital camera equipment, as well as portable video projectors, made it easier to make and screen short films. The internet and video streaming on platforms, such as YouTube, have contributed to new demand for short form entertainment.

Short films are used as an educational medium for students, predominantly in high schools and universities. Filmmaking is considered an "active learning activity" and an "indirect learning method of education," which helps students better understand human relations and the relationship between individuals and society.

=== Studio shorts and distribution ===
A small number of animated shorts continue to be released through mainstream commercial distribution. Shorts are occasionally broadcast as filler when a feature film or other work does not fit the standard broadcast schedule.

Pixar has made over three dozen animated short films since André & Wally B. in 1984. The studio has screened a short along with each of its feature films since its initial theatrical run of Toy Story in 1995.

DreamWorks Animation often produces a short sequel to include in the special edition video releases of major features, and are typical of a sufficient length to be broadcast as a TV special, a few films from the studio have added theatrical shorts as well.

Warner Bros. often includes old shorts from its considerable library, connected only thematically, on the DVD releases of classic WB movies. From 2010–2012, Warner Bros. also released new Looney Tunes shorts before family films.

ShortsTV is a television channel dedicated to short films and the exclusive presenter of the Academy Awards nominated shorts theatrical releases. Shorts International and Magnolia Pictures have organized an annual release of Academy Award-nominated short films in theatres across the US, UK, Canada and Mexico throughout February and March.

=== Festivals ===
Short films generally rely on film festival exhibition to reach an audience. Such movies can also be distributed via the Internet. Certain websites which encourage the submission of user-created short films, such as YouTube and Vimeo, have attracted large communities of artists and viewers. Sites like Omeleto, FILMSshort, Short of the Week, Short Films Matter, Short Central and some apps showcase curated shorts.

Among the oldest film festivals dedicated to short films are Clermont-Ferrand International Short Film Festival, France (since 1979), Tampere Film Festival, Finland (since 1969) and International Short Film Festival Oberhausen, Germany (since 1954). All of them are still considered the most important short film festivals in the world to date.

== See also ==
- Reel, for an explanation of the historic term "two-reeler"
- List of animated short series
- List of independent short films
- List of short subjects by Hollywood studio
- Micro movie
- Movieola: The Short Film Channel
- Music video
- One-minute film
- Tampere Film Festival
- The Journal of Short Film
- Tropfest
